= 2026 Ohio State Buckeyes football team =

American college football season

2026 Ohio State Buckeyes football
- Conference: Big Ten Conference

Ranking
- AP: No. 25
- CFP: No. 14
- Record: 7–4 (5–3 Big Ten)
- Head coach: Ryan Day (8th season)
- Offensive coordinator: Arthur Smith (1st season)
- Co-offensive coordinator: Keenan Bailey (2nd season)
- Offensive scheme: Pro spread
- Defensive coordinator: Matt Patricia (2nd season)
- Co-defensive coordinator: Tim Walton (2nd season)
- Base defense: 4–2–5
- Captains: Brandon Inniss; Kenyatta Jackson; Jaylen McClain; Payton Pierce; Julian Sayin; Austin Siereveld; Jeremiah Smith
- Home stadium: Ohio Stadium

2026 Big Ten Conference football standings
	Conf.			Overall
Team	W		L	W		L
No. 4 UCLA	7	–	1	10	–	1
No. 8 Indiana	6	–	2	9	–	2
No. 15 Iowa	6	–	2	9	–	2
No. 13 Oregon	6	–	2	8	–	3
No. 18 USC	5	–	3	8	–	3
No. 14 Ohio State	5	–	3	7	–	4
Wisconsin	5	–	3	7	–	4
Nebraska	4	–	4	7	–	4
Washington	4	–	4	7	–	4
Illinois	4	–	4	6	–	5
Minnesota	4	–	4	6	–	5
Michigan	3	–	5	6	–	5
Northwestern	3	–	5	6	–	5
Penn State	3	–	5	6	–	5
Maryland	2	–	6	4	–	7
Purdue	2	–	6	3	–	8
Rutgers	2	–	6	3	–	8
Michigan State	1	–	7	3	–	8
Championship: December 5, 2026
^ – College Football Playoff participant; $ – Conference champion; y – Championship game participant; As of November 22, 2026; Rankings from CFP rankings

The 2026 Ohio State Buckeyes football team officially represents The Ohio State University as a member of the Big Ten Conference (B1G) during the 2026 NCAA Division I FBS football season. They are led by their eighth-year head coach Ryan Day and play home games at Ohio Stadium in Columbus, Ohio. It is the Buckeyes' 137th season overall and 114th as a member of the Big Ten.

== Offseason ==
Positions key
Offense	Defense	Special teams
QB — Quarterback; RB — Running back; FB — Fullback; WR — Wide receiver; TE — Tight end; OL — Offensive lineman; T — Tackle; G — Guard; C — Center	DL — Defensive lineman; DT — Defensive tackle (Note: Includes nose tackle (NT)); DE — Defensive end; EDGE — Edge rusher; LB — Linebacker (Note: Includes middle linebacker (MLB/MIKE), weakside linebacker (WILL), strongside linebacker (SAM), off-ball linebacker, and outside linebacker (OLB)); DB — Defensive back; CB — Cornerback; S — Safety (Note: Includes free safety (FS) and strong safety (SS))	K — Kicker (Note: Also known as a placekicker (PK)); P — Punter; LS — Long snapper; RS — Return specialist (Note: Includes kickoff and punt returners)

=== Coaching staff changes ===
==== Departures ====
Name	Position	New team	New position
Brian Hartline	Offensive coordinator	South Florida	Head coach
Marcus Johnson	Assistant offensive line coach	Arkansas	Offensive line coach
Tony Washington Jr.	Assistant defensive line coach	Kentucky	Outside linebackers/Defensive ends coach
Michael Hunter Jr.	Assistant defensive backs coach	Los Angeles Rams	Cornerbacks coach

==== Additions ====
Name	Position	Previous team	Previous position
Cortez Hankton	Wide receivers coach	LSU	Wide receivers coach
Anthony Schlegel	Associate director of strength and conditioning	None	
Arthur Smith	Offensive coordinator	Pittsburgh Steelers	Offensive coordinator
Robby Discher	Special teams coordinator	Illinois	Special teams coordinator

=== Players drafted into the NFL ===
Round	Pick	NFL team	Player	Position
1	4	Tennessee Titans	Carnell Tate	WR
1	5	New York Giants	Arvell Reese	LB
1	7	Washington Commanders	Sonny Styles	LB
1	11	Dallas Cowboys	Caleb Downs	S
2	36	Houston Texans	Kayden McDonald	DT
2	61	Los Angeles Rams	Max Klare	TE
2	62	Buffalo Bills	Davison Igbinosun	CB
3	87	Miami Dolphins	Will Kacmarek	TE
5	172	New Orleans Saints	Lorenzo Styles Jr.	S
6	214	Indianapolis Colts	Caden Curry	DE
7	231	Atlanta Falcons	Ethan Onianwa	OT
Undrafted		New Orleans Saints	CJ Donaldson	RB
Undrafted		Carolina Panthers	Tywone Malone Jr.	DT
Undrafted		Cleveland Browns	John Ferlmann	LS

=== Transfers ===
==== Outgoing ====
The Buckeyes lost a total 38 players to the transfer portal.

Player	Number	Position	Height	Weight	Class	Hometown	New school
Devontae Armstrong	#73	IOL	6'5"	314	Sophomore	Elyria, OH	Miami (OH)
Jarquez Carter	#91	DL	6'1"	288	Freshman	Newberry, FL	Miami (FL)
Jackson Courville	#96	K	5'10"	185	Junior	Centerville, OH	Tulane
Faheem Delane	#10	S	6'1"	210	Freshman	Good Hope, MD	LSU
Sam Dixon	#24	RB	5'11"	206	Sophomore	Pickerington, OH	South Carolina
Logan George	#48	EDGE	6'4"	260	Junior	Pocatello, ID	Washington
Mylan Graham	#5	WR	6'1"	195	Sophomore	Fort Wayne, IN	Notre Dame
Diante Griffin	#43	CB	5'9"	187	Senior	Lima, OH	Ball State
Cody Haddad	#30	S	5'11"	186	Freshman	Cleveland, OH	Iowa
Malik Hartford	#9	S	6'2"	200	Junior	West Chester, OH	UCLA
C. J. Hicks	#11	LB	6'3"	243	Senior	Dayton, OH	South Florida
Isaiah Kema	#56	IOL	6'3"	312	Freshman	Lubbock, TX	Utah
Lincoln Kienholz	#3	QB	6'2"	214	Junior	Pierre, SD	Louisville
Dominic Kirks	#55	EDGE	6'4"	267	Sophomore	Cleveland, OH	Northwestern
Shawn Lodge	#80	WR	5'9"	182	Senior	Akron, OH	Walsh
Mason Maggs	#16	QB	6'2"	226	Senior	Dublin, OH	IUP
Jayvon McFadden	#71	IOL	6'3"	295	Freshman	Upper Marlboro, MD	Colorado
Nick McLarty	#19	P	6'7"	255	Sophomore	Melbourne, VIC	Arizona State
Eric Mensah	#90	DL	6'2"	302	Sophomore	Stafford, VA	Virginia Tech
Joshua Mickens	#52	EDGE	6'3"	250	Junior	Indianapolis, IN	UConn
Bukari Miles Jr.	#34	CB	6'1"	192	Sophomore	West Chester, OH	Incarnate Word
Bodpegn Miller	#18	WR	6'3"	196	Freshman	Mansfield, OH	Washington
Grant Mills	#41	LS	5'10"	223	Sophomore	Mooresville, NC	UMass
Keenan Nelson Jr.	#16	S	6'0"	205	Senior	Philadelphia, PA	Georgia State
Trajen Odom	#88	DL	6'3"	295	Freshman	Inglewood, CA	Arkansas
James Peoples	#20	RB	5'10"	206	Sophomore	San Antonio, TX	Penn State
Quincy Porter	#11	WR	6'4"	210	Freshman	New Milford, NJ	Notre Dame
Trey Robinette	#14	QB	6'3"	189	Freshman	Washington Court House, OH	
Bryson Rodgers	#13	WR	6'2"	192	Junior	Tampa, FL	South Florida
Maxwell Roy	#93	DL	6'3"	301	Freshman	Philadelphia, PA	UCLA
Aaron Scott Jr.	#5	CB	6'0"	195	Sophomore	Springfield, OH	Oregon
Justin Terry	#65	OT	6'5"	324	Sophomore	Pickerington, OH	Virginia Tech
Jelani Thurman	#15	TE	6'6"	250	Junior	Fairburn, GA	North Carolina
Ahmed Tounkara	#59	DL	6'0"	280	Sophomore	Dublin, OH	Western Michigan
Tegra Tshabola	#77	OL	6'6"	322	Senior	West Chester, OH	Kentucky
Bryce West	#12	CB	5'11"	197	Sophomore	Cleveland, OH	Wisconsin
Dorian Williams	#84	WR	6'2"	213	Sophomore	Cincinnati, OH	Youngstown State
Damarion Witten	#81	WR	6'3"	206	Sophomore	Cleveland, OH	Miami (OH)

==== Incoming ====
The Buckeyes added 22 players from the transfer portal.

Player	Number	Position	Height	Weight	Class	Hometown	Previous school
Christian Alliegro	#14	LB	6'4"	241	Senior	Darien, CT	Wisconsin
Landon Beal	#61	LS	6'0"	208	RS Sophomore	Grove City, OH	Maine
Cam Calhoun	#18	CB	6'0"	176	RS Junior	Cincinnati, OH	Alabama
Brady Geibel	#19	QB	6'4"	207	RS Freshman	Sugarcreek, OH	Furman
Connor Hawkins	#96	K	6'1"	200	RS Sophomore	Liberty Hill, TX	Baylor
Ja'Kobi Jackson	#24	RB	5'11"	217	RS Senior	Pensacola, FL	Florida
Dominick Kelly	#24	CB	6'2"	190	Sophomore	St. Petersburg, FL	Georgia
Earl Little Jr.	#1	S	6'0"	198	RS Junior	Fort Lauderdale, FL	Florida State
Justyn Martin	#16	QB	6'4"	230	RS Senior	Inglewood, CA	Maryland
Devin McCuin	#3	WR	6'0"	189	Senior	Jacksonville, TX	UTSA
Terry Moore	#11	S	6'0"	200	RS Senior	Washington, NC	Duke
Kyle Parker	#5	WR	5'10"	195	RS Junior	Allen, TX	LSU
Nate Riegle	#56	DE	6'2"	215	RS Sophomore	Findlay, OH	Ohio
Dalton Riggs	#48	LS	6'2"	231	RS Senior	Eagle, ID	UCF
Qua Russaw	#4	EDGE	6'2"	240	RS Junior	Montgomery, AL	Alabama
James Smith	#3	DL	6'2"	314	Senior	Montgomery, AL	Alabama
John Walker	#55	DL	6'3"	303	RS Junior	Kissimmee, FL	UCF
Vasean Washington	#	OT	6'5"	285	RS Senior	Springfield, OH	Dartmouth
Hunter Welcing	#84	TE	6'3"	246	RS Senior	Deer Park, IL	Northwestern
Mason Williams	#86	TE	6'4"	247	Senior	Mogadore, OH	Ohio
Ashton Yeager	#59	DT	6'2"	280	RS Freshman	Findlay, OH	Bowling Green
Brady Young	#93	P	6'3"	207	RS Senior	Perrysburg, OH	Houston Christian

=== Recruiting class ===
College recruiting (2026)
Name	Hometown	School	Height	Weight	Commit date
Chris Henry Jr. WR	Santa Ana, California	Mater Dei High School	6 ft 5 in (1.96 m)	201 lb (91 kg)	Jul 28, 2023
Chris Henry Jr. WR	Recruit ratings: Rivals: 247Sports: ESPN: (92)				
Cincere Johnson; LB	Cleveland, Ohio	Glenville High School	6 ft 3 in (1.91 m)	222 lb (101 kg)	Jun 19, 2025
Cincere Johnson; LB	Recruit ratings: Rivals: 247Sports: ESPN: (90)				
Jay Timmons; CB	Gibsonia, Pennsylvania	Pine-Richland High School	5 ft 11 in (1.80 m)	185 lb (84 kg)	Nov 6, 2025
Jay Timmons; CB	Recruit ratings: 247Sports: ESPN: (86)				
Blaine Bradford; S	Baton Rouge, Louisiana	Catholic High School	6 ft 1 in (1.85 m)	205 lb (93 kg)	Mar 31, 2025
Blaine Bradford; S	Recruit ratings: Rivals: 247Sports: ESPN: (86)				
Jerquaden Guilford; WR	Fort Wayne, Indiana	Northrop High School	6 ft 1.5 in (1.87 m)	182 lb (83 kg)	Jul 18, 2025
Jerquaden Guilford; WR	Recruit ratings: 247Sports: ESPN: (84)				
Khary Wilder; EDGE	Gardena, California	Junípero Serra High School	6 ft 4 in (1.93 m)	260 lb (120 kg)	Jun 10, 2025
Khary Wilder; EDGE	Recruit ratings: Rivals: 247Sports: ESPN: (83)				
Simeon Caldwell; S	Jacksonville, Florida	The Bolles School	6 ft 2 in (1.88 m)	195 lb (88 kg)	Apr 3, 2025
Simeon Caldwell; S	Recruit ratings: Rivals: 247Sports: ESPN: (83)				
Max Riley; IOL	Avon Lake, Ohio	Avon Lake High School	6 ft 5 in (1.96 m)	280 lb (130 kg)	Mar 10, 2025
Max Riley; IOL	Recruit ratings: Rivals: 247Sports: ESPN: (83)				
Sam Greer; OT	Akron, Ohio	Archbishop Hoban High School	6 ft 6.4 in (1.99 m)	331 lb (150 kg)	Mar 25, 2025
Sam Greer; OT	Recruit ratings: Rivals: 247Sports: ESPN: (83)				
Jordan Thomas; CB	Oradell, New Jersey	Bergen Catholic High School	6 ft 0 in (1.83 m)	189 lb (86 kg)	May 12, 2025
Jordan Thomas; CB	Recruit ratings: Rivals: 247Sports: ESPN: (83)				
Legend Bey; RB	Forney, Texas	North Forney High School	5 ft 10.5 in (1.79 m)	175 lb (79 kg)	Dec 22, 2025
Legend Bey; RB	Recruit ratings: 247Sports: ESPN: (82)				
C.J. Sanna; LB	Lewis Center, Ohio	Olentangy High School	6 ft 2 in (1.88 m)	220 lb (100 kg)	Apr 4, 2025
C.J. Sanna; LB	Recruit ratings: Rivals: 247Sports: ESPN: (81)				
Favour Akih; RB	Delaware, Ohio	Rutherford B. Hayes High School	6 ft 0 in (1.83 m)	195 lb (88 kg)	Jun 8, 2025
Favour Akih; RB	Recruit ratings: Rivals: 247Sports: ESPN: (81)				
Jaeden Ricketts; WR	Pataskala, Ohio	Watkins Memorial High School	6 ft 0 in (1.83 m)	190 lb (86 kg)	Nov 16, 2024
Jaeden Ricketts; WR	Recruit ratings: Rivals: 247Sports: ESPN: (80)				
Damari Simeon; DL	Richland, New Jersey	St. Augustine Preparatory School	6 ft 2 in (1.88 m)	275 lb (125 kg)	Jun 27, 2025
Damari Simeon; DL	Recruit ratings: Rivals: 247Sports: ESPN: (80)				
Darryus McKinley; DL	Lafayette, Louisiana	Acadiana High School	6 ft 4 in (1.93 m)	275 lb (125 kg)	Nov 26, 2025
Darryus McKinley; DL	Recruit ratings: 247Sports: ESPN: (80)				
Emanuel Ruffin; DL	Bessemer, Alabama	Bessemer City High School	6 ft 4 in (1.93 m)	295 lb (134 kg)	Nov 9, 2025
Emanuel Ruffin; DL	Recruit ratings: 247Sports: ESPN: (80)				
Dre Quinn; EDGE	Buford, Georgia	Buford High School	6 ft 4 in (1.93 m)	228 lb (103 kg)	Nov 16, 2025
Dre Quinn; EDGE	Recruit ratings: 247Sports: ESPN: (80)				
Khmari Bing; S	Baltimore, Maryland	Saint Frances Academy	6 ft 0 in (1.83 m)	190 lb (86 kg)	Oct 14, 2025
Khmari Bing; S	Recruit ratings: 247Sports: ESPN: (80)				
Braxton Rembert; EDGE	Hoschton, Georgia	Mill Creek High School	6 ft 5 in (1.96 m)	200 lb (91 kg)	Nov 18, 2025
Braxton Rembert; EDGE	Recruit ratings: 247Sports: ESPN: (80)				
Tucker Smith; IOL	Glendale, Arizona	Sandra Day O'Connor High School	6 ft 5 in (1.96 m)	275 lb (125 kg)	Mar 26, 2025
Tucker Smith; IOL	Recruit ratings: Rivals: 247Sports: ESPN: (79)				
Kaden Gebhardt; S	Lewis Center, Ohio	Olentangy High School	6 ft 2 in (1.88 m)	200 lb (91 kg)	Dec 3, 2025
Kaden Gebhardt; S	Recruit ratings: 247Sports: ESPN: (78)				
Luke Fahey; QB	Mission Viejo, California	Mission Viejo High School	6 ft 0 in (1.83 m)	185 lb (84 kg)	Jul 3, 2025
Luke Fahey; QB	Recruit ratings: 247Sports: ESPN: (78)				
Brock Boyd; WR	Southlake, Texas	Carroll Senior High School	6 ft 1 in (1.85 m)	180 lb (82 kg)	Apr 15, 2025
Brock Boyd; WR	Recruit ratings: Rivals: 247Sports: ESPN: (77)				
Jamir Perez; DL	Cleveland, Ohio	Glenville High School	6 ft 4 in (1.93 m)	360 lb (160 kg)	Jul 4, 2025
Jamir Perez; DL	Recruit ratings: 247Sports: ESPN: (77)				
Landry Brede; OT	Mentor, Ohio	Mentor High School	6 ft 5 in (1.96 m)	285 lb (129 kg)	Oct 13, 2025
Landry Brede; OT	Recruit ratings: 247Sports: ESPN: (76)				
Mason Wilhelm; IOL	Lakewood, Ohio	St. Edward High School	6 ft 4 in (1.93 m)	280 lb (130 kg)	Nov 7, 2025
Mason Wilhelm; IOL	Recruit ratings: 247Sports: ESPN: (76)				
Nick Lautar; TE	Lebanon, Ohio	Lebanon High School	6 ft 5 in (1.96 m)	230 lb (100 kg)	Nov 16, 2025
Nick Lautar; TE	Recruit ratings: 247Sports: ESPN: (75)				
Cooper Peterson; K	Charlotte, North Carolina	Corvian Community School	6 ft 0 in (1.83 m)	190 lb (86 kg)	Jan 23, 2026
Cooper Peterson; K	Recruit ratings: 247Sports: ESPN: (72)				
Overall recruit ranking: Rivals: 5 247Sports: 2 ESPN: 0
Note: In many cases, Scout, Rivals, 247Sports, On3, and ESPN may conflict in their listings of height and weight.; In these cases, the average was taken. ESPN grades are on a 100-point scale.; Sources: "2026 Ohio State Football Commitment List". Rivals.; "2026 Ohio State Football Commitment List". ESPN.; "2026 Team Ranking". Rivals.com.; "Ohio State 2026 Football Commits". 247Sports.

==== Recruiting class rankings ====
Website	National rank	Conference rank	5 star recruits	4 star recruits	3 star recruits	Total
On3	3	2	5	10	13	28
247 Sports	5	3	1	17	10	28
ESPN	9	3	2	18	8	28

==== Walk-ons ====
Player	Number	Position	Height	Weight	Class	Hometown	Previous school

== Schedule ==
Date	Time	Opponent	Rank	Site	TV	Result	Attendance
September 5	12:30 p.m.	Ball State*	No. 1	Ohio Stadium; Columbus, OH	BTN	W 56–3	101,120
September 12	7:30 p.m.	at No. 4 Texas*	No. 1	Darrell K Royal–Texas Memorial Stadium; Austin, TX (College GameDay)	ABC	L 23–24	105,044
September 19	12:00 p.m.	Kent State*	No. 6	Ohio Stadium; Columbus, OH	FOX	W 59–3	100,009
September 26	12:00 p.m.	Illinois	No. 7	Ohio Stadium; Columbus, OH (Illibuck, Big Noon Kickoff)	FOX	W 42–19	101,452
October 3	3:30 p.m.	at No. 14 Iowa	No. 5	Kinnick Stadium; Iowa City, IA (College GameDay)	CBS	W 31–14	69,250
October 10	4:15 p.m.	Maryland^{†}	No. 5	Ohio Stadium; Columbus, OH	BTN	W 45–16	102,589
October 17	12:00 p.m.	at No. 5 Indiana	No. 4	Memorial Stadium; Bloomington, IN (Big Noon Kickoff)	FOX	W 19–15	54,532
October 31	7:30 p.m.	at USC	No. 2	Los Angeles Memorial Coliseum; Los Angeles, CA	NBC	L 18–30	70,810
November 7	3:30 p.m.	No. 23 Oregon	No. 12	Ohio Stadium; Columbus, OH	CBS	L 28–41	103,551
November 14	12:00 p.m.	Northwestern	No. 20	Ohio Stadium; Columbus, OH	FOX	W 28–19	101,256
November 21	12:00 p.m.	at Nebraska	No. 14	Memorial Stadium; Lincoln, NE	FOX	L 28–31	85,699
November 28	12:00 p.m.	Michigan		Ohio Stadium; Columbus, OH (The Game, Big Noon Kickoff)	FOX		
*Non-conference game; ^{†}Homecoming; Rankings from AP Poll (and CFP Rankings, after November 3) – Released prior to game; All times are in Eastern time; Source:

== Rankings ==
Ranking movements Legend: ██ Increase in ranking ██ Decrease in ranking RV = Received votes ( ) = First-place votes
	Week															
Poll	Pre	1	2	3	4	5	6	7	8	9	10	11	12	13	14	Final
AP	1 (40)	1 (46)	6	7	5	5	4	3 (9)	2 (10)	11	21	16	25			
Coaches	1 (38)	1 (50)	6	7	6	6	5 (1)	2 (13)	2 (6)	10	20	17	RV			
CFP	Not released									12	20	14				Not released

== Game summaries ==
=== vs Ball State ===
Ball State Cardinals (0–0) at No. 1 Ohio State Buckeyes (0–0) – Game summary

Quarter	1	2	3	4	Total
Cardinals	0	3	0	0	3
No. 1 Buckeyes	14	14	14	14	56

at Ohio Stadium • Columbus, Ohio

- Date: September 5
- Game time: 12:30 p.m. EST
- Game weather: Cloudy • Temperature: 80 °F (27 °C) • Wind: N at 5 miles per hour (8.0 km/h)
- Game attendance: 101,120
- Referee: Gregory Blum
- TV announcers (BTN): Jeff Levering (play-by-play), Jake Butt (analyst), and Brooke Fletcher (sideline reporter)

Game information

First quarter

- OSU – Jeremiah Smith 48-yard pass from Julian Sayin (Connor Hawkins kick), 8:47. Buckeyes 7–0. Drive: 7 plays, 99 yards, 3:18.
- OSU – Devin McCuin 17-yard pass from Julian Sayin (Connor Hawkins kick), 1:23. Buckeyes 14–0. Drive: 9 plays, 75 yards, 4:29.

Second quarter

- OSU – Julian Sayin 3-yard run (Connor Hawkins kick), 12:08. Buckeyes 21–0. Drive: 6 plays, 28 yards, 2:41.
- BALL – Brody Boehm 54-yard field goal, 1:17. Buckeyes 21–3. Drive: 11 plays, 38 yards, 2:42.
- OSU – Jeremiah Smith 3-yard pass from Julian Sayin (Connor Hawkins kick), 0:10. Buckeyes 28–3. Drive: 9 plays, 90 yards, 1:05.

Third quarter

- OSU – Bo Jackson 65-yard run (Connor Hawkins kick), 11:29. Buckeyes 35–3. Drive: 4 plays, 94 yards, 1:57.
- OSU – Ja'Kobi Jackson 49-yard run (Connor Hawkins kick), 8:20. Buckeyes 42–3. Drive: 3 plays, 62 yards, 1:35.

Fourth quarter

- OSU – Legend Bey 25-yard pass from Luke Fahey (Connor Hawkins kick), 14:16. Buckeyes 49–3. Drive: 10 plays, 83 yards, 5:23.
- OSU – Chris Henry Jr. 15-yard pass from Tavien St. Clair (Cooper Peterson kick), 1:55. Buckeyes 56–3. Drive: 8 plays, 58 yards, 3:57.

Statistics	BALL	OSU
First downs	13	32
Plays–yards	82–165	72–671
Rushes–yards	23–45	35–237
Passing yards	120	434
Passing: comp–att–int	20–37–1	31–37–1
Turnovers	1	1
Time of possession	28:22	31:38

Team	Category	Player	Statistics
Ball State	Passing	Keldric Luster	18/33, 89 yards, INT
Ball State	Rushing	Elijah Jackson	2 carries, 20 yards
Ball State	Receiving	Elisha Durham	1 reception, 26 yards
Ohio State	Passing	Julian Sayin	21/25, 320 yards, 3 TD
Ohio State	Rushing	Bo Jackson	9 carries, 83 yards, TD
Ohio State	Receiving	Jeremiah Smith	8 receptions, 151 yards, 2 TD

=== at No. 4 Texas ===
No. 1 Ohio State Buckeyes (1–0) at No. 4 Texas Longhorns (1–0) – Game summary

Quarter	1	2	3	4	Total
No. 1 Buckeyes	10	10	3	0	23
No. 4 Longhorns	0	3	0	21	24

at Darrell K Royal–Texas Memorial Stadium • Austin, Texas

- Date: September 12
- Game time: 7:30 p.m. EST
- Game weather: Sunny
- Game attendance: 105,044
- Referee: Kole Knueppel
- TV announcers (ABC): Chris Fowler (play-by-play), Kirk Herbstreit (analyst), Holly Rowe, and Laura Rutledge (sideline reporters)

Game information

First quarter

- (12:04) OSU - Connor Hawkins 26-yard field goal, (Drive: 4 plays, 11 yards, 02:45; Ohio State 3-0)
- (05:39) OSU - Ja'Kobi Jackson 8-yard run (Connor Hawkins kick), (Drive: 10 plays, 81 yards, 04:36; Ohio State 10-0)

Second quarter

- (05:42) TEX - Gianni Spetic 37-yard field goal, (Drive: 16 plays, 69 yards, 07:41; Ohio State 10-3)
- (01:41) OSU - Connor Hawkins 30-yard field goal, (Drive: 9 plays, 63 yards, 04:01; Ohio State 13-3)
- (00:10) OSU - Jeremiah Smith 19-yard pass from Julian Sayin (Connor Hawkins kick), (Drive: 4 plays, 49 yards, 00:39; Ohio State 20-3)

Third quarter

- (08:09) OSU - Connor Hawkins 48-yard field goal, (Drive: 7 plays, 43 yards, 01:51; Ohio State 23-3)

Fourth quarter

- (14:19) TEX - Ryan Wingo 3-yard pass from Arch Manning (Gianni Spetic kick), (Drive: 15 plays, 91 yards, 06:28; Ohio State 23-10)
- (07:14) TEX Hollywood Smothers 1-yard run (Gianni Spetic kick), (Drive: 13 plays, 72 yards, 05:32; Ohio State 23-17)
- (00:25) TEX - Hollywood Smothers 1-yard run (Gianni Spetic kick), (Drive: 12 plays, 73 yards, 3:51; Texas 24-23)

Statistics	OSU	TEX
First downs	19	25
Plays–yards	63-372	78-336
Rushes–yards	31-94	41-141
Passing yards	278	195
Passing: comp–att–int	17–32–1	23–37–1
Turnovers	1	2
Time of possession	28:32	31:28

Team	Category	Player	Statistics
Ohio State	Passing	Julian Sayin	17/32, 278 yards, TD, INT
Ohio State	Rushing	Bo Jackson	19 carries, 74 yards
Ohio State	Receiving	Jeremiah Smith	8 receptions, 164 yards, TD
Texas	Passing	Arch Manning	23/37, 195 yards, TD, INT
Texas	Rushing	Hollywood Smothers	21 carries, 74 yards, 2 TD
Texas	Receiving	Emmett Mosley V	5 receptions, 65 yards

=== vs Kent State ===
Kent State Golden Flashes (1–1) at No. 6 Ohio State Buckeyes (1–1) – Game summary

Quarter	1	2	3	4	Total
Golden Flashes	0	0	0	3	3
No. 6 Buckeyes	21	14	7	17	59

at Ohio Stadium • Columbus, Ohio

- Date: September 19
- Game time: 12:00 p.m. EST
- Game weather: Sunny • Temperature: 75 °F (24 °C) • Wind: SE at 10 miles per hour (16 km/h)
- Game attendance: 100,009
- Referee: Bryan Banks
- TV announcers (FOX): Gus Johnson (play-by-play), Joel Klatt (analyst), and Jenny Taft (sideline reporter)

Statistics	KENT	OSU
First downs	6	25
Plays–yards	55–134	66–527
Rushes–yards	34–71	38–145
Passing yards	63	382
Passing: comp–att–int	8–21–1	22–28–2
Turnovers	3	2
Time of possession	29:39	30:21

Team	Category	Player	Statistics
Kent State	Passing	Dru DeShields	6/15, 35 yards, INT
Kent State	Rushing	Brandon White	5 carries, 21 yards
Kent State	Receiving	Wayne Harris	2 receptions, 29 yards
Ohio State	Passing	Julian Sayin	18/22, 241 yards, 2 TD
Ohio State	Rushing	Bo Jackson	11 carries, 73 yards, TD
Ohio State	Receiving	Jeremiah Smith	5 receptions, 85 yards

=== vs Illinois (Illibuck) ===
Illinois Fighting Illini (2–1) at No. 7 Ohio State Buckeyes (2–1) – Game summary

Quarter	1	2	3	4	Total
Fighting Illini	7	3	3	6	19
No. 7 Buckeyes	14	14	0	14	42

at Ohio Stadium • Columbus, Ohio

- Date: September 26
- Game time: 12:00 p.m. EST
- Game weather: Sunny • Temperature: 66 °F (19 °C) • Wind: NE at 10 miles per hour (16 km/h)
- Game attendance: 101,452
- Referee: Francisco Villar
- TV announcers (FOX): Gus Johnson (play-by-play), Joel Klatt (analyst), and Jenny Taft (sideline reporter)

Statistics	ILL	OSU
First downs	25	27
Plays–yards	71–462	68–518
Rushes–yards	33–199	32–151
Passing yards	263	367
Passing: comp–att–int	21–38–0	27–36–0
Turnovers	0	0
Time of possession	30:38	29:22

Team	Category	Player	Statistics
Illinois	Passing	Katin Houser	21/37, 263 yards, TD
Illinois	Rushing	Aidan Laughery	11 carries, 113 yards
Illinois	Receiving	Hudson Clement	5 receptions, 87 yards
Ohio State	Passing	Julian Sayin	27/36, 367 yards, 4 TD
Ohio State	Rushing	Ja'Kobi Jackson	10 carries, 56 yards, TD
Ohio State	Receiving	Jeremiah Smith	12 receptions, 217 yards, 4 TD

=== at No. 14 Iowa ===
No. 5 Ohio State Buckeyes (3–1) at No. 14 Iowa Hawkeyes (4–0) – Game summary

Quarter	1	2	3	4	Total
No. 5 Buckeyes	10	7	7	7	31
No. 14 Hawkeyes	6	0	0	8	14

at Kinnick Stadium • Iowa City, Iowa

- Date: October 3
- Game time: 3:30 p.m. EDT
- Game weather: Sunny • Temperature: 69 °F (21 °C) • Wind: NW at 9 miles per hour (14 km/h)
- Game attendance: 69,250
- Referee: Mark Kluczynski
- TV announcers (CBS): Brad Nessler (play-by-play), Charles Davis (analyst), and Jenny Dell (sideline reporter)

Statistics	OSU	IOWA
First downs	25	15
Plays–yards	74–484	53–238
Rushes–yards	47–160	21–39
Passing yards	324	199
Passing: comp–att–int	20–27–1	17–32–1
Time of possession	38:02	21:58

Team	Category	Player	Statistics
Ohio State	Passing	Julian Sayin	20/27, 324 yards, 3 TD
Ohio State	Rushing	Ja'Kobi Jackson	14 carries, 72 yards, TD
Ohio State	Receiving	Jeremiah Smith	11 receptions, 206 yards, 2 TD
Iowa	Passing	Hank Brown	12/27, 132 yards, INT
Iowa	Rushing	Kamari Moulton	11 carries, 27 yards
Iowa	Receiving	DJ Vonnahme	6 receptions, 64 yards

=== vs Maryland ===
Maryland Terrapins (2–3) at No. 5 Ohio State Buckeyes (4–1) – Game summary

Quarter	1	2	3	4	Total
Terrapins	3	7	6	0	16
No. 5 Buckeyes	14	17	7	7	45

at Ohio Stadium • Columbus, Ohio

- Date: October 10
- Game time: 4:15 p.m. EDT
- Game weather: Cloudy • Temperature: 71 °F (22 °C) • Wind: SE at 9 miles per hour (14 km/h)
- Game attendance: 102,589
- Referee: Jason Nickleby
- TV announcers (BTN): Mark Followill (play-by-play), Jake Butt (analyst), and Brooke Fletcher (sideline reporter)

Game information

First Quarter

- (8:40) Ohio State - Jeremiah Smith 33-yard pass from Julian Sayin (Connor Hawkins kick), (Drive: 2 plays, 36 yards, 1:07; Ohio State 7-0)
- (3:55) Maryland - Sean O'Haire 39-yard field goal (Drive: 7 plays, 11 yards, 2:29; Ohio State 7-3)
- (3:03) Ohio State - Nate Roberts 68-yard pass from Julian Sayin (Connor Hawkins kick), (Drive: 2 plays, 71 yards, 0:46; Ohio State 14-3)

Second Quarter

- (11:23) Maryland - Malik Washington 5-yard rush (Sean O'Haire kick), (Drive: 11 plays, 75 yards, 6:40; Ohio State 14-10)
- (8:32) Ohio State - Jeremiah Smith 40-yard pass from Julian Sayin (Connor Hawkins kick), (Drive: 5 plays, 77 yards, 2:46; Ohio State 21-10)
- (5:55) Ohio State - Connor Hawkins 40-yard field goal (Drive: 6 plays, 42 yards, 1:39; Ohio State 24-10)
- (0:24) Ohio State - Mason Williams 1-yard pass from Julian Sayin (Connor Hawkins kick), (Drive: 8 plays, 44 yards, 3:11; Ohio State 31-10)

Third Quarter

- (5:12) Maryland - Daniel Wingate returns a 52-yard interception for a touchdown (Two-Point Conversation pass failed), (Drive: 3 plays, 25 yards, 2:32; Ohio State 31-16)
- (2:38) Ohio State - Bo Jackson 25-yard rush (Connor Hawkins kick), (Drive: 7 plays, 64 yards, 2:32; Ohio State 38-16)

Fourth Quarter

- (4:52) Ohio State - Bo Jackson 2-yard rush (Connor Hawkins kick), (Drive: 16 plays, 72 yards, 9:59; Ohio State 45-19)

Statistics	MD	OSU
First downs	10	24
Plays–yards	53–146	69–449
Rushes–yards	28–82	48–207
Passing yards	64	242
Passing: comp–att–int	12–25–0	13–21–1
Turnovers	0	2
Time of possession	25:21	34:39

Team	Category	Player	Statistics
Maryland	Passing	Malik Washington	12/25, 64 yards
Maryland	Rushing	Dejuan Williams	16 carries, 48 yards
Maryland	Receiving	Chris Durr Jr.	4 receptions, 15 yards
Ohio State	Passing	Julian Sayin	13/21, 242 yards, 4 TD, INT
Ohio State	Rushing	Bo Jackson	23 carries, 107 yards, 2 TD
Ohio State	Receiving	Jeremiah Smith	4 receptions, 93 yards, 2 TD

=== at No. 5 Indiana ===
No. 4 Ohio State Buckeyes (5–1) at No. 5 Indiana Hoosiers (6–0) – Game summary

Quarter	1	2	3	4	Total
No. 4 Buckeyes	3	7	3	6	19
No. 5 Hoosiers	0	7	0	8	15

at Memorial Stadium • Bloomington, Indiana

- Date: October 17
- Game time: 12:00 p.m. EDT
- Game weather: Sunny; • Temperature: 51 °F (11 °C) • Wind: N at 8 miles per hour (13 km/h)
- Game attendance: 54,532
- Referee: Jeff Servinski
- TV announcers (FOX): Gus Johnson (play-by-play), Joel Klatt (analyst), Jenny Taft, and Tom Rinaldi (sideline reporters)

Statistics	OSU	IU
First downs	19	17
Total yards	313	369
Rushes–yards	37-78	29-73
Passing yards	235	296
comp–att–int	15-31-2	20-40-0
Time of possession	32:12	27:48

Team	Category	Player	Statistics
Ohio State	Passing	Julian Sayin	15/29, 235 yards 2 TD, 2 INT
Ohio State	Rushing	Bo Jackson	18 carries, 56 yards
Ohio State	Receiving	Jeremiah Smith	4 receptions, 68 yards, 1 TD
Indiana	Passing	Josh Hoover	20/40, 296 yards, 1 TD
Indiana	Rushing	Turbo Richard	16 carries, 46 yards, 1 TD
Indiana	Receiving	Charlie Becker	9 receptions, 165 yards

=== at USC ===
No. 2 Ohio State Buckeyes (6–1) at USC Trojans (6–2) – Game summary

Quarter	1	2	3	4	Total
No. 2 Buckeyes	3	6	0	9	18
Trojans	14	6	7	3	30

at Los Angeles Memorial Coliseum • Los Angeles, California

- Date: October 31
- Game time: 7:30 p.m. EDT
- Game attendance: 70,810
- Referee: Kole Knueppel
- TV announcers (NBC): Noah Eagle (play-by-play), Todd Blackledge (analyst), and Kathryn Tappen (sideline reporter)

Statistics	OSU	USC
First downs	25	15
Plays–yards	81–464	50–338
Rushes–yards	43–204	27–116
Passing yards	260	222
Passing: comp–att–int	21–38–0	15–23–0
Time of possession	39:28	20:32

Team	Category	Player	Statistics
Ohio State	Passing	Luke Fahey	21/38, 260 yards, TD
Ohio State	Rushing	Bo Jackson	21 carries, 121 yards
Ohio State	Receiving	Jeremiah Smith	10 receptions, 83 yards, TD
USC	Passing	Jayden Maiava	15/22, 222 yards, TD
USC	Rushing	King Miller	13 carries, 78 yards, TD
USC	Receiving	Trent Mosley	5 receptions, 101 yards, TD

=== vs No. 23 Oregon ===
No. 23 Oregon Ducks (5–3) at No. 12 Ohio State Buckeyes (6–2) – Game summary

Quarter	1	2	3	4	Total
No. 23 Ducks	0	17	14	10	41
No. 12 Buckeyes	14	0	0	14	28

at Ohio Stadium • Columbus, Ohio

- Date: November 7
- Game time: 3:30 p.m. EST
- TV announcers (CBS): Brad Nessler (play-by-play), Charles Davis (analyst) and Jenny Dell (sideline reporter)

Statistics	ORE	OSU
First downs	22	23
Plays–yards	74–395	71–413
Rushes–yards	33–108	21–53
Passing yards	287	360
Passing: comp–att–int	26–41–0	36–50–1
Time of possession	30:01	29:59

Team	Category	Player	Statistics
Oregon	Passing	Dylan Raiola	25/40, 257 yards, 2 TD
Oregon	Rushing	Dierre Hill Jr.	13 carries, 75 yards, 2 TD
Oregon	Receiving	Dakorien Moore	7 receptions, 56 yards, TD
Ohio State	Passing	Luke Fahey	36/50, 360 yards, 2 TD, INT
Ohio State	Rushing	Bo Jackson	11 carries, 48 yards, 2 TD
Ohio State	Receiving	Jeremiah Smith	7 receptions, 133 yards, TD

=== vs Northwestern ===
Northwestern Wildcats (6–3) at No. 20 Ohio State Buckeyes (6–3) – Game summary

Quarter	1	2	3	4	Total
Wildcats	3	3	7	6	19
No. 20 Buckeyes	0	14	7	7	28

at Ohio Stadium • Columbus, Ohio

- Date: November 14
- Game time: 12:00 pm
- Game weather: Cloudy
- Game attendance: 101,256
- Referee: Jeff Servinski
- TV announcers (FOX): Connor Onion (play-by-play), Robert Griffin III (analyst), and Alexa Landestoy (sideline reporter)

Statistics	NU	OSU
First downs	15	24
Plays–yards	60–278	67–369
Rushes–yards	29–53	35–168
Passing yards	225	201
Passing: comp–att–int	18–31–0	21–32–1
Time of possession	27:09	32:51

Team	Category	Player	Statistics
Northwestern	Passing	Nicco Marchiol	18/31, 225 yards, TD
Northwestern	Rushing	Caleb Komolafe	11 carries, 54 yards
Northwestern	Receiving	Luke Dehnicke	5 receptions, 88 yards, TD
Ohio State	Passing	Luke Fahey	21/32, 201 yards, 3 TD, INT
Ohio State	Rushing	Bo Jackson	20 carries, 114 yards, TD
Ohio State	Receiving	Jeremiah Smith	11 receptions, 117 yards, TD

=== at Nebraska ===
No. 14 Ohio State Buckeyes (7–3) at Nebraska Cornhuskers (6–4) – Game summary

Quarter	1	2	3	4	Total
No. 14 Buckeyes	7	7	7	7	28
Cornhuskers	7	14	0	10	31

at Memorial Stadium • Lincoln, Nebraska

- Date: November 21
- Game time: 12:00 pm
- Game weather: Cloudy
- Game attendance: 85,699
- Referee: Jason Nickleby
- TV announcers (FOX): Gus Johnson (play-by-play), Joel Klatt (analyst), and Jenny Taft (sideline reporter)

Statistics	OSU	NEB
First downs		
Plays–yards		
Rushes–yards		
Passing yards		
Passing: comp–att–int		
Time of possession		

Team	Category	Player	Statistics
Ohio State	Passing		
Ohio State	Rushing		
Ohio State	Receiving		
Nebraska	Passing		
Nebraska	Rushing		
Nebraska	Receiving		

=== vs Michigan (The Game) ===
Michigan Wolverines (6–5) at Ohio State Buckeyes (7–4) – Game summary

Quarter	1	2	3	4	Total
Wolverines	0	0	0	0	0
Buckeyes	0	0	0	0	0

at Ohio Stadium • Columbus, Ohio

- Date: November 28
- Game time: 12:00 p.m.
- TV announcers (FOX): Gus Johnson (play-by-play), Joel Klatt (analyst), Jenny Taft, and Tom Rinaldi (sideline reporters)

Statistics	MICH	OSU
First downs		
Plays–yards		
Rushes–yards		
Passing yards		
Passing: comp–att–int		
Time of possession		

Team	Category	Player	Statistics
Michigan	Passing		
Michigan	Rushing		
Michigan	Receiving		
Ohio State	Passing		
Ohio State	Rushing		
Ohio State	Receiving		

== Personnel ==
=== Roster ===
2026 Ohio State Buckeyes football team roster
Players
Coaches
Offense

Pos.	#	Name	Class
WR	0	Brandon Inniss (C)	Sr
RB	2	Legend Bey	Fr
WR	3	Devin McCuin	Sr
WR	4	Jeremiah Smith (C)	Jr
WR	5	Kyle Parker	Jr
WR	6	Jerquaden Guilford	Fr
WR	7	Phillip Bell	Fr
WR	8	De'Zie Jones	Fr
QB	9	Tavien St. Clair	Fr
QB	10	Julian Sayin (C)	So
WR	11	Brock Boyd	Fr
QB	13	Luke Fahey	Fr
WR	15	Chris Henry Jr.	Fr
QB	16	Justyn Martin	Sr
QB	18	Kolton Stover	Fr
QB	19	Brady Geibel	Fr
RB	21	Turbo Rogers	Fr
WR	23	Nolan Baudo	Jr
RB	24	Ja'Kobi Jackson	Sr
RB	25	Bo Jackson	So
RB	28	Stanley Jackson Jr.	So
RB	29	Favour Akih	Fr
WR	30	Amari Valerio-Hudson	Fr
RB	32	Isaiah West	So
WR	34	Brennen Schramm	Jr
OL	51	Luke Montgomery	Sr
OL	57	Ian Gecse	Jr
OL	58	Gabe VanSickle	So
OL	60	Jaxon Powell	Fr
OL	62	Joshua Padilla	Jr
OL	63	Julian Goines-Jackson	Sr
OL	64	Simon Lorentz	So
OL	65	Landry Brede	Fr
OL	67	Austin Siereveld (C)	Jr
OL	68	Mason Wilhelm	Fr
OL	69	Ian Moore	So
OL	70	Phillip Daniels	Jr
OL	72	Deontae Armstrong	So
OL	74	Carter Lowe	Fr
OL	75	Carson Hinzman	Sr
OL	76	Jake Cook	Fr
OL	77	Sam Greer	Fr
OL	78	Max Riley	Fr
WR	80	Jaeden Ricketts	Fr
WR	82	David Adolph	Sr
TE	83	Nate Roberts	So
TE	84	Hunter Welcing	Sr
TE	85	Bennett Christian	Sr
TE	86	Mason Williams	Sr
TE	87	Brody Lennon	Fr
TE	88	Maxence LeBlanc	So
TE	89	Nick Lautar	Fr

Defense

Pos.	#	Name	Class
CB	1	Earl Little Jr.	Jr
DE	2	Kenyatta Jackson Jr. (C)	Sr
DT	3	James Smith	Sr
DE	4	Qua Russaw	Jr
LB	5	Riley Pettijohn	So
CB	6	Devin Sanchez	So
CB	7	Jermaine Mathews Jr.	Sr
S	8	Jaylen McClain (C)	Jr
DL	9	Zion Grady	So
S	10	Leroy Roker III	So
S	11	Terry Moore	Sr
DL	12	Beau Atkinson	Sr
CB	13	Miles Lockhart	So
LB	14	Christian Alliegro	Sr
CB	15	Jordan Thomas	Fr
S	16	Blaine Bradford	Fr
LB	17	TJ Alford	So
CB	18	Cam Calhoun	Jr
CB	19	Jordyn Woods	Fr
LB	20	Cincere Johnson	Fr
LB	21	Inky Jones	Sr
LB	23	Garrett Stover	Jr
CB	24	Dominick Kelly	So
CB	25	Jay Timmons	Fr
LB	26	Payton Pierce (C)	Jr
S	28	Simeon Caldwell	Fr
S	29	Deshawn Stewart	Fr
S	30	Khmari Bing	Fr
S	32	Kaden Gebhardt	Fr
LB	33	Eli Lee	Fr
DE	34	Khary Wilder	Fr
S	35	Jaystin Gwinn	Fr
LB	36	CJ Sanna	Fr
LB	37	Zach Hayes	So
LB	38	Eli Riggs	So
DB	39	Glorien Gough	So
LB	41	Braxton Rembert	Fr
CB	43	Amar'e Miller	Fr
DE	44	Epi Sitanilei	Fr
S	46	Ryan Rudzinski	Jr
S	49	Gavin Thobe	Fr
LB	50	Alec DelSignore	Jr
LB	52	Ty Howard	Sr
DL	53	Will Smith Jr.	Jr
DT	55	John Walker	Jr
DE	56	Nate Riegle	So
DT	59	Ashton Yeager	Fr
DL	90	Damari Simeon	Fr
DL	91	Darryus McKinley	Fr
DL	94	Jason Moore	Jr
DL	95	Emanuel Ruffin	Fr
DE	96	Eddrick Houston	Jr
DL	97	Dre Quinn	Fr
DL	98	Jamir Perez	Fr

Special teams

Pos.	#	Name	Class
P	42	Joe McGuire	Jr
LS	48	Dalton Riggs	Sr
K	49	Marcello Diomede	Jr
LS	61	Landon Beal	So
P	93	Brady Young	Sr
K	96	Connor Hawkins	So

Head coach

- Ryan Day

Coordinators/assistant coaches

- Matt Patricia – Defensive coordinator
- Larry Johnson – Associate head coach/defensive line
- Tim Walton – Co-defensive coordinator/assistant head coach/secondary
- Matt Guerrieri – Safeties/pass game coordinator
- James Laurinaitis – Linebackers
- Arthur Smith – Offensive coordinator
- Keenan Bailey – Co-offensive coordinator/tight ends
- Tyler Bowen – Offensive line/run game coordinator
- Billy Fessler – Pass game coordinator/quarterbacks
- Cortez Hankton – Wide receivers
- Carlos Locklyn – Running backs
- Vacant – Special teams coordinator
- Taver Johnson – Position assistant - defense
- Sam McGrath – Position assistant - defense
- Billy Yates – Position assistant - defense
- Austin Fields – Quality control - offense
- Josh Boyer – Senior analyst - defense
- Jason Brooks – Quality control - defense
- Tony Johnson – Senior analyst/offensive personnel coordinator
- Rob Keys – Senior analyst
- Joe Kim – Senior analyst - defense
- Miguel Patrick – Analyst/defensive personnel coordinator
- Gunner Daniel – Assistant special teams coordinator
- Devin Jordan – Quality control - offense
- Mateo Kambui – Position assistant - offense
- Colin Keanu – Program assistant - offense
- Thomas Morton – Position assistant - offense
- Tyler Walton – Program assistant - defense
- Mickey Marotti – Associate AD/football sports performance
- Charlie Dickey – Program assistant - offense

Legend

- (C) Team captain
- (S) Suspended
- (I) Ineligible
- Injured
- Redshirt

Roster
Last update: May 22, 2026

=== Depth chart ===
Defense

S
25 Jay Timmons
13 Miles Lockhart
⋅

FS
1 Earl Little Jr.
10 Leroy Roker III
30 Khmari Bing

WLB	SLB
14 Christian Alliegro	26 Payton Pierce
5 Riley Pettijohn	17 Tarvos "TJ" Alford
20 Cincere Johnson	23 Garrett Stover

SS
8 Jaylen McClain
11 Terry Moore
16 Blaine Bradford

CB
7 Jermaine Mathews Jr.
18 Cam Calhoun
⋅

DE	DT	DT	DE
12 Beau Atkinson	96 Eddrick Houston	55 John Walker	2 Kenyatta Jackson Jr.
4 Qua Russaw	3 James Smith	53 Will Smith Jr.	9 Zion Grady
44 Epi Sitanilei	⋅	94 Jason Moore	34 Khary Wilder

CB
6 Devin Sanchez
24 Dominick Kelly
15 Jordan Thomas

Offense

WR
4 Jeremiah Smith
11 Brock Boyd
7 Phillip Bell

WR
0 Brandon Inniss
5 Kyle Parker
8 De'Zie Jones

LT	LG	C	RG	RT
69 Ian Moore	51 Luke Montgomery	75 Carson Hinzman	67 Austin Siereveld	70 Phillip Daniels
77 Sam Greer	76 Jake Cook	62 Joshua Padilla	58 Gabe VanSickle	74 Carter Lowe
⋅	⋅	⋅	⋅	72 Deontae Armstrong

TE
83 Nate Roberts
86 Mason Williams
85 Bennett Christian

WR
3 Devin McCuin
15 Chris Henry Jr.
6 Jerquaden Guilford

QB
10 Julian Sayin
13 Luke Fahey
9 Tavien St. Clair
16 Justyn Martin

Key reserves

RB
25 Bo Jackson
32 Isaiah West
24 Ja'Kobi Jackson
2 Legend Bey

Special teams
PK 96 Connor Hawkins
PK 49 Marcello Diomede
P 42 Joe McGuire
P 93 Brady Young
KR 0 Brandon Inniss
2 Legend Bey
PR 0 Brandon Inniss
LS 55 Dalton Riggs
H 42 Joe McGuire

== Statistics ==
=== Team ===
	Ohio State	Opp
Points per game	56	3
Total		
First downs		
Rushing		
Passing		
Penalty		
Rushing yards		
Avg per rush		
Avg per game		
Rushing touchdowns		
Passing yards	1,958	919
Att-Comp-Int		
Avg per pass		
Avg per game		
Passing touchdowns		
Total offense		
Avg per play		
Avg per game		
Fumbles-Lost		
Penalties-Yards		
Avg per game		
Punts-Yards		
Avg per punt		
Time of possession/Game		
3rd down conversions		
3rd Down Pct.		
4th down conversions		
4th Down Pct.		
Sacks-Yards		
Touchdowns scored		
Field goals-Attempts		
PAT-Attempts		

=== Individual leaders ===
==== Offense ====
Passing statistics
#	NAME	POS	RAT	CMP	ATT	YDS	AVG/G	CMP%	TD	INT	LONG

Rushing statistics
#	NAME	POS	ATT	GAIN	AVG	TD	LONG	AVG/G

Receiving statistics
#	NAME	POS	CTH	YDS	AVG	TD	LONG	AVG/G

==== Defense ====
Defense statistics

Key: POS: Position, SOLO: Solo Tackles, AST: Assisted Tackles, TOT: Total Tackles, TFL: Tackles-for-loss, SACK: Quarterback Sacks, INT: Interceptions, BU: Passes Broken Up, PD: Passes Defended, QBH: Quarterback Hits, FR: Fumbles Recovered, FF: Forced Fumbles, BLK: Kicks or Punts Blocked, SAF: Safeties, TD : Touchdown

==== Special teams ====
Kicking statistics

Kickoff statistics
#	NAME	POS	KICKS	YDS	AVG	TB	OB

Punting statistics
#	NAME	POS	PUNTS	YDS	AVG	LONG	TB	FC	I–20	50+	BLK

Kick return statistics
#	NAME	POS	RTNS	YDS	AVG	TD	LNG

Punt return statistics
#	NAME	POS	RTNS	YDS	AVG	TD	LONG

=== Scoring ===
==== Ohio State vs. non-conference opponents ====
	1	2	3	4	Total
Ohio State	0	0	0	0	0
Opponents	0	0	0	0	0

==== Ohio State vs. Big Ten opponents ====
	1	2	3	4	Total
Ohio State	0	0	0	0	0
Opponents	0	0	0	0	0

==== Ohio State vs. all opponents ====
	1	2	3	4	Total
Ohio State	0	0	0	0	0
Opponents	0	0	0	0	0

== Awards and honors ==
=== Preseason honors ===
Big Ten Preseason Honors
#	Name	Pos	Year

=== In-season awards ===
==== Weekly Individual Awards ====
Big Ten Weekly Honors
Date	Player	Position	Award
Week 4	Jeremiah Smith	WR	Offensive Player of the Week
Week 5	Jeremiah Smith	WR	Co-Offensive Player of the Week
Week 7	Jay Timmons	CB	Freshman Player of the Week
Week 11	Luke Fahey	QB	Freshman Player of the Week

==== Weekly Individual Awards ====
National Weekly Honors
Date	Player	Position	Award
Week 4	Jeremiah Smith	WR	AP National Player of the Week
