= 2026 Ball State Cardinals football team =

American college football season

2026 Ball State Cardinals football
- Conference: Mid-American Conference
- Record: 3–8 (2–5 MAC)
- Head coach: Mike Uremovich (2nd season)
- Offensive scheme: Multiple
- Defensive coordinator: Jeff Knowles (3rd season)
- Base defense: 3–4
- Home stadium: Scheumann Stadium

2026 Mid-American Conference football standings
	Conf.			Overall
Team	W		L	W		L
Ohio	6	–	1	8	–	3
Western Michigan	6	–	1	8	–	3
Buffalo	6	–	1	8	–	3
Toledo	5	–	1	8	–	2
Miami (OH)	5	–	2	7	–	4
Bowling Green	3	–	3	3	–	7
Central Michigan	3	–	4	5	–	6
Eastern Michigan	3	–	4	4	–	7
UMass	2	–	5	5	–	6
Kent State	2	–	5	3	–	8
Ball State	2	–	5	3	–	8
Akron	1	–	6	2	–	9
Sacramento State	1	–	7	2	–	9
Championship: December 5, 2026
As of November 19, 2026; Rankings from AP poll

The 2026 Ball State Cardinals football team is who represents Ball State University as a member of the Mid-American Conference (MAC) during the 2026 NCAA Division I FBS football season. The Cardinals will be led by Mike Uremovich in his second year as the head coach. The Cardinals play their home games at Scheumann Stadium in Muncie, Indiana.

== Offseason ==
=== Transfers ===
==== Outgoing ====
Player	Position	Destination

==== Incoming ====
Player	Position	Previous school

=== Coaching staff additions ===
Name	New Position	Previous Team	Previous Position	Source

== Preseason ==
=== Preseason polls ===
==== Coaches Poll ====
On July 22, the MAC announced the preseason coaches poll. Western Michigan was named the preseason favorite to win the conference while last year's other finalist, Miami, also received votes to win the championship.

MAC Coaches poll
Predicted finish	Team	Votes (1st place)
1	Toledo	135 (7)
2	Miami	131 (3)
3	Ohio	123 (3)
4	Buffalo	115
5	Northern Illinois	94
6	Bowling Green	81
7	Western Michigan	71
8	Eastern Michigan	68
9	Central Michigan	65
10	Ball State	41
T11	Akron	39
T11	Massachusetts	39
13	Kent State	12

Coaches poll (MAC Championship)
Predicted finish	Team	Votes
1	Toledo	6
2	Miami	4
3	Ohio	3

== Schedule ==
Date	Time	Opponent	Site	TV	Result	Attendance
September 5	12:30 p.m.	at No. 1 Ohio State*	Ohio Stadium; Columbus, OH	BTN	L 3–56	101,120
September 12	2:00 p.m.	Stony Brook*	Scheumann Stadium; Muncie, IN	ESPN+	W 41–17	10,390
September 19	4:00 p.m.	at Liberty*	Williams Stadium; Lynchburg, VA	ESPN+	L 15–51	18,330
September 26	12:00 p.m.	at Kent State	Dix Stadium; Kent, OH	ESPN+	L 13–26	11,059
October 3	2:00 p.m.	Toledo	Scheumann Stadium; Muncie, IN	ESPN+	L 24–39	9,744
October 10	12:30 p.m.	at Northwestern*	Ryan Field; Evanston, IL	BTN	L 14–45	25,629
October 17	12:00 p.m.	at Bowling Green	Doyt Perry Stadium; Bowling Green, OH	ESPN+	W 32–31 ^{OT}	19,875
October 24	3:30 p.m.	Sacramento State^{†}	Scheumann Stadium; Muncie, IN	ESPN+	W 34–17	12,518
November 4	7:00 p.m.	at UMass	Warren McGuirk Alumni Stadium; Hadley, MA	ESPNU	L 30–31 ^{OT}	8,881
November 11	7:30 p.m.	Buffalo	Scheumann Stadium; Muncie, IN	ESPN2	L 7–28	6,745
November 17	7:00 p.m.	at Ohio	Peden Stadium; Athens, OH	CBSSN	L 28–35	12,237
November 28	12:00 p.m.	Central Michigan	Scheumann Stadium; Muncie, IN	CBSSN		
*Non-conference game; ^{†}Homecoming; Rankings from AP Poll and CFP Rankings released prior to game; All times are in Eastern time

== Game summaries ==
=== at No. 1 Ohio State ===
Ball State Cardinals (0–0) at No. 1 Ohio State Buckeyes (0–0) – Game summary

Quarter	1	2	3	4	Total
Cardinals	0	3	0	0	3
No. 1 Buckeyes	14	14	14	14	56

at Ohio Stadium • Columbus, Ohio

- Date: September 5
- Game time: 12:30 p.m.
- Game weather: Cloudy • Temperature: 80 °F (27 °C) • Wind: N at 5 miles per hour (8.0 km/h)
- Game attendance: 101,120
- Referee: Gregory Blum
- TV announcers (BTN): Jeff Levering, Jake Butt and Brooke Fletcher

Game information

First quarter

- OSU – Jeremiah Smith 48-yard pass from Julian Sayin (Connor Hawkins kick), 8:47. Buckeyes 7–0. Drive: 7 plays, 99 yards, 3:18.
- OSU – Devin McCuin 17-yard pass from Julian Sayin (Connor Hawkins kick), 1:23. Buckeyes 14–0. Drive: 9 plays, 75 yards, 4:29.

Second quarter

- OSU – Julian Sayin 3-yard run (Connor Hawkins kick), 12:08. Buckeyes 21–0. Drive: 6 plays, 28 yards, 2:41.
- BALL – Brody Boehm 54-yard field goal, 1:17. Buckeyes 21–3. Drive: 11 plays, 38 yards, 2:42.
- OSU – Jeremiah Smith 3-yard pass from Julian Sayin (Connor Hawkins kick), 0:10. Buckeyes 28–3. Drive: 9 plays, 90 yards, 1:05.

Third quarter

- OSU – Bo Jackson 65-yard run (Connor Hawkins kick), 11:29. Buckeyes 35–3. Drive: 4 plays, 94 yards, 1:57.
- OSU – Ja'Kobi Jackson 49-yard run (Connor Hawkins kick), 8:20. Buckeyes 42–3. Drive: 3 plays, 62 yards, 1:35.

Fourth quarter

- OSU – Legend Bey 25-yard pass from Luke Fahey (Connor Hawkins kick), 14:16. Buckeyes 49–3. Drive: 10 plays, 83 yards, 5:23.
- OSU – Chris Henry Jr. 15-yard pass from Tavien St. Clair (Cooper Peterson kick), 1:55. Buckeyes 56–3. Drive: 8 plays, 58 yards, 3:57.

Statistics	BALL	OSU
First downs	13	32
Plays–yards	82–165	72–671
Rushes–yards	23–45	35–237
Passing yards	120	434
Passing: comp–att–int	20–37–1	31–37–1
Turnovers	1	1
Time of possession	28:22	31:38

Team	Category	Player	Statistics
Ball State	Passing	Keldric Luster	18/33, 89 yards, INT
Ball State	Rushing	Elijah Jackson	2 carries, 20 yards
Ball State	Receiving	Elisha Durham	1 reception, 26 yards
Ohio State	Passing	Julian Sayin	21/25, 320 yards, 3 TD
Ohio State	Rushing	Bo Jackson	9 carries, 83 yards, TD
Ohio State	Receiving	Jeremiah Smith	8 receptions, 151 yards, 2 TD

=== Stony Brook (FCS) ===
Stony Brook Seawolves (FCS) (1–1) at Ball State Cardinals (0–1) – Game summary

Quarter	1	2	3	4	Total
Seawolves (FCS)	0	3	0	14	17
Cardinals	7	14	0	20	41

at Scheumann Stadium • Muncie, Indiana

- Date: September 12
- Game time: 2:00 p.m.
- Game weather: Rain • Temperature: 76 °F (24 °C) • Wind: SW at 8 miles per hour (13 km/h)
- Game attendance: 10,390
- Referee: Matt Packowski
- TV announcers (ESPN+): Kelsie Kaspar and Jay Sonnhalter

Game information

First quarter

- BALL – Tate Hoover 3-yard pass from Keldric Luster (Brody Boehm kick), 1:41. Cardinals 7–0. Drive: 9 plays, 66 yards, 4:35.

Second quarter

- BALL – Jabari Smith 23-yard pass from Keldric Luster (Brody Boehm kick), 9:23. Cardinals 14–0. Drive: 8 plays, 70 yards, 4:20.
- BALL – Jalen Bonds 23-yard pass from Keldric Luster (Brody Boehm kick), 6:03. Cardinals 21–0. Drive: 2 plays, 24 yards, 0:46.
- STBK – Michael Mannino 45-yard field goal, 3:05. Cardinals 21–3. Drive: 8 plays, 48 yards, 2:58.

Third quarter

- No scoring plays.

Fourth quarter

- BALL – Brody Boehm 38-yard field goal, 10:36. Cardinals 24–3. Drive: 15 plays, 60 yards, 8:00.
- BALL – Brody Boehm 30-yard field goal, 6:00. Cardinals 27–3. Drive: 7 plays, 30 yards, 3:02.
- STBK – Jeremiah Coney 3-yard run (Rayden Aphayvong–Quinn Boyd pass), 3:18. Cardinals 27–11. Drive: 7 plays, 75 yards, 2:42.
- BALL – Jalen Bonds 49-yard run (Brody Boehm kick), 3:03. Cardinals 34–11. Drive: 2 plays, 50 yards, 0:15.
- STBK – Jeremiah Coney 66-yard run (pass failed), 2:26. Cardinals 34–17. Drive: 3 plays, 75 yards, 0:37.
- BALL – TJ Horton 54-yard run (Brody Boehm kick), 2:17. Cardinals 41–17. Drive: 1 play, 54 yards, 0:09.

Statistics	STBK	BALL
First downs	15	23
Plays–yards	64–330	68–482
Rushes–yards	28–183	36–226
Passing yards	147	256
Passing: comp–att–int	22–36–2	27–32–1
Turnovers	2	1
Time of possession	26:53	33:07

Team	Category	Player	Statistics
Stony Brook	Passing	Quinn Boyd	22/35, 147 yards, 2 INT
Stony Brook	Rushing	Jeremiah Coney	9 carries, 89 yards, 2 TD
Stony Brook	Receiving	Seth Sweitzer	7 receptions, 50 yards
Ball State	Passing	Keldric Luster	27/32, 256 yards, 3 TD, INT
Ball State	Rushing	TJ Horton	9 carries, 125 yards, TD
Ball State	Receiving	Jabari Smith	6 receptions, 72 yards, TD

=== at Liberty ===
Ball State Cardinals (1–1) at Liberty Flames (1–1) – Game summary

Quarter	1	2	3	4	Total
Cardinals	7	0	8	0	15
Flames	13	10	14	14	51

at Williams Stadium • Lynchburg, Virginia

- Date: September 19
- Game time: 4:00 p.m.
- Game weather: Sunny • Temperature: 81 °F (27 °C) • Wind: E at 5 miles per hour (8.0 km/h)
- Game attendance: 18,330
- Referee: Stuart Mullins
- TV announcers (ESPN+): Matt Warner (play-by-play), Walter Virgil (analyst) and Emily Austen (sideline reporter)

Game information

First quarter

- (10:16) LIB – Makai Jackson 12-yard pass from Deshawn Purdie (Drive: 7 plays, 45 yards, 3:50; Liberty 6–0)
- (5:47) BALL – TJ Horton 2-yard run, Brody Boehm kick (Drive: 9 plays, 75 yards, 4:29; Ball State 7–6)
- (3:46) LIB – Jamari Person 16-yard pass from Deshawn Purdie, Chase Reeves kick (Drive: 4 plays, 75 yards, 2:01; Liberty 13–7)

Second quarter

- (8:48) LIB – Chase Reeves 46-yard field goal (Drive: 14 plays, 60 yards, 7:48; Liberty 16–7)
- (0:13) LIB – Jamari Person 7-yard pass from Deshawn Purdie, Chase Reeves kick (Drive: 7 plays, 62 yards, 0:56; Liberty 23–7)

Third quarter

- (11:17) LIB – Ethan Vasko 4-yard run, Chase Reeves kick (Drive: 6 plays, 77 yards, 3:38; Liberty 30–7)
- (6:59) LIB – Kam Davis 14-yard run, Chase Reeves kick (Drive: 6 plays, 69 yards, 2:22; Liberty 37–7)
- (2:42) BALL – TJ Horton 1-yard run, Keldric Luster rush (Drive: 8 plays, 75 yards, 4:17; Liberty 37–15)

Fourth quarter

- (7:29) LIB – Terron Kellman 21-yard pass from Jaylen Henderson, Tyler Black kick (Drive: 11 plays, 80 yards, 6:54; Liberty 44–15)
- (5:02) LIB – Jaylin Belford 1-yard run, Tyler Black kick (Drive: 4 plays, 16 yards, 2:08; Liberty 51–15)

Statistics	BALL	LIB
First downs	17	23
Plays–yards	56–261	64–460
Rushes–yards	35–168	40–212
Passing yards	93	248
Passing: comp–att–int	10–21–0	16–24–0
Turnovers	1	1
Time of possession	28:01	31:59

Team	Category	Player	Statistics
Ball State	Passing	Keldric Luster	10/21, 93 yards
Ball State	Rushing	TJ Horton	8 carries, 79 yards, 2 TD
Ball State	Receiving	Isaiah Thacker	4 receptions, 44 yards
Liberty	Passing	Deshawn Purdie	13/20, 211 yards, 3 TD
Liberty	Rushing	Terron Kellman	3 carries, 51 yards
Liberty	Receiving	Makai Jackson	4 receptions, 88 yards, TD

=== at Kent State ===
Ball State Cardinals (1–2) at Kent State Golden Flashes (1–2) – Game summary

Quarter	1	2	3	4	Total
Cardinals	0	0	0	0	0
Golden Flashes	0	0	0	0	0

at Dix Stadium • Kent, Ohio

- Date: September 26
- Game time: 12:00 p.m. EDT
- Game attendance: 11,059
- TV announcers (ESPN+): Michael Reghi and Je'Rod Cherry

Statistics	BALL	KENT
First downs		
Plays–yards		
Rushes–yards		
Passing yards		
Passing: comp–att–int		
Turnovers		
Time of possession		

Team	Category	Player	Statistics
Ball State	Passing		
Ball State	Rushing		
Ball State	Receiving		
Kent State	Passing		
Kent State	Rushing		
Kent State	Receiving		

=== Toledo ===
Toledo Rockets (3–1) at Ball State Cardinals (1–3) – Game summary

Quarter	1	2	3	4	Total
Rockets	6	9	7	17	39
Cardinals	7	3	7	7	24

at Scheumann Stadium • Muncie, Indiana

- Date: October 3
- Game time: 2:00 p.m.
- Game weather: Sunny • Temperature: 67 °F (19 °C) • Wind: NE at 13 miles per hour (21 km/h)
- Game attendance: 9,744
- Referee: Matt Packowski
- TV announcers (ESPN+): Kelsie Kasper (play-by-play) and Marcus Ray (analyst)

Game information

First quarter

- BSU – Alex Scherle 4-yard pass from Keldric Luster (Brody Boehm kick), 10:09. Cardinals 7–0. Drive: 10 plays, 75 yards, 4:51.
- TOL – Reice Griffith 43-yard field goal, 8:05. Cardinals 7–3. Drive: 6 plays, 49 yards, 2:04.
- TOL – Reice Griffith 21-yard field goal, 3:47. Cardinals 7–6. Drive: 9 plays, 34 yards, 2:58.

Second quarter

- BSU – Brody Boehm 38-yard field goal, 10:49. Cardinals 10–6. Drive: 7 plays, 45 yards, 2:43.
- TOL – Team safety, 7:58. Cardinals 10–8.
- TOL – Daryl Barnett Jr. 11-yard pass from John Alan Richter (Reice Griffith kick), 0:00. Rockets 15–10. Drive: 8 plays, 80 yards, 1:25.

Third quarter

- TOL – Connor Walendzak 30-yard run (Reice Griffith kick), 2:57. Rockets 22–10. Drive: 5 plays, 72 yards, 1:48.
- BSU – TJ Horton 66-yard run (Brody Boehm kick), 2:17. Rockets 22–17. Drive: 2 plays, 75 yards, 0:40.

Fourth quarter

- TOL – CJ Miller 2-yard run (Reice Griffith kick), 13:27. Rockets 29–17. Drive: 8 plays, 75 yards, 3:50.
- TOL – Reice Griffith 24-yard field goal, 3:30. Rockets 32–17. Drive: 13 plays, 37 yards, 7:18.
- BSU – Jabari Smith 33-yard pass from Keldric Luster (Brody Boehm kick), 2:09. Rockets 32–24. Drive: 5 plays, 49 yards, 1:12.
- TOL – CJ Miller 68-yard run (Reice Griffith kick), 1:35. Rockets 39–24. Drive: 4 plays, 84 yards, 0:31.

Statistics	TOL	BALL
First downs	27	18
Plays–yards	86–553	62–370
Rushes–yards	51–352	27–132
Passing yards	201	238
Passing: comp–att–int	19–35–0	22–35–1
Turnovers	0	2
Time of possession	34:20	25:40

Team	Category	Player	Statistics
Toledo	Passing	John Alan Richter	19/35, 201 yards, TD
Toledo	Rushing	CJ Miller	20 carries, 196 yards, 2 TD
Toledo	Receiving	Adjatay Dabbs	6 receptions, 196 yards, 2 TD
Ball State	Passing	Keldric Luster	21/33, 224 yards, 2 TD, INT
Ball State	Rushing	TJ Horton	9 carries, 90 yards, TD
Ball State	Receiving	Donovan Hamilton	6 receptions, 70 yards

=== at Northwestern ===
Ball State Cardinals (1–4) at Northwestern Wildcats (3–1) – Game summary

Quarter	1	2	3	4	Total
Cardinals	0	14	0	0	14
Wildcats	14	17	14	0	45

at Ryan Field • Evanston, Illinois

- Date: October 10
- Game time: 12:30 p.m.
- Game weather: Sunny • Temperature: 76 °F (24 °C) • Wind: S 13 mph
- Game attendance: 25,629
- Referee: Bryan Banks
- TV announcers (BTN): Chris Vosters (play-by-play), Anthony Herron (analyst), and Dannie Rogers (sideline)

Statistics	BALL	NU
First downs	22	26
Plays–yards	78–360	55–436
Rushes–yards	31–90	31–164
Passing yards	270	272
Passing: comp–att–int	32–47–1	17–24–0
Turnovers	1	0
Time of possession	33:59	26:01

Team	Category	Player	Statistics
Ball State	Passing	Keldric Luster	27/41, 209 yards, TD, INT
Ball State	Rushing	Johnny Thompson Jr. Ace Cooper	7 carries, 15 yards 2 carries, 15 yards
Ball State	Receiving	Jabari Smith	7 receptions, 64 yards
Northwestern	Passing	Aidan Chiles	17/23, 272 yards, 3 TD
Northwestern	Rushing	Caleb Komolafe	8 carries, 44 yards, TD
Northwestern	Receiving	Griffin Wilde	8 receptions, 144 yards, TD

=== at Bowling Green ===
Ball State Cardinals (1–5) at Bowling Green Falcons (2–4) – Game summary

Quarter	1	2	3	4	Total
Cardinals	0	0	0	0	0
Falcons	0	0	0	0	0

at Doyt Perry Stadium • Bowling Green, Ohio

- Date: October 17
- Game time: 12:00 p.m.
- Game attendance: 19,875
- TV: ESPN+

Game information

First quarter
Second quarter
Third quarter
Fourth quarter

Statistics	BALL	BGSU
First downs		
Plays–yards		
Rushes–yards		
Passing yards		
Passing: comp–att–int		
Turnovers		
Time of possession		

Team	Category	Player	Statistics
Ball State	Passing		
Ball State	Rushing		
Ball State	Receiving		
Bowling Green	Passing		
Bowling Green	Rushing		
Bowling Green	Receiving		

=== Sacramento State (Homecoming Game) ===
Sacramento State Hornets (1–6) at Ball State Cardinals (2–5) – Game summary

Quarter	1	2	3	4	Total
Hornets	0	0	0	0	0
Cardinals	0	0	0	0	0

at Scheumann Stadium • Muncie, Indiana

- Date: October 24
- Game time: 3:30 p.m.
- TV: ESPN+

Statistics	SAC	BALL
First downs		
Plays–yards		
Rushes–yards		
Passing yards		
Passing: comp–att–int		
Turnovers		
Time of possession		

Team	Category	Player	Statistics
Sacramento State	Passing		
Sacramento State	Rushing		
Sacramento State	Receiving		
Ball State	Passing		
Ball State	Rushing		
Ball State	Receiving		

=== at UMass ===
Ball State Cardinals (3–5) at UMass Minutemen (4–4) – Game summary

Quarter	1	2	3	4	Total
Cardinals	0	0	0	0	0
Minutemen	0	0	0	0	0

at Warren McGuirk Alumni Stadium • Hadley, Massachusetts

- Date: November 4

Statistics	BALL	MASS
First downs		
Total yards		
Rushing yards		
Passing yards		
Passing: Comp–Att–Int		
Turnovers		
Time of possession		

Team	Category	Player	Statistics
Ball State	Passing		
Ball State	Rushing		
Ball State	Receiving		
UMass	Passing		
UMass	Rushing		
UMass	Receiving		

=== Buffalo ===
Buffalo Bulls (6–3) at Ball State Cardinals (3–6) – Game summary

Quarter	1	2	3	4	Total
Bulls	0	0	0	0	0
Cardinals	0	0	0	0	0

at Scheumann Stadium • Muncie, Indiana

- Date: November 11

Statistics	BUFF	BALL
First downs		
Plays–yards		
Rushes–yards		
Passing yards		
Passing: comp–att–int		
Turnovers		
Time of possession		

Team	Category	Player	Statistics
Buffalo	Passing		
Buffalo	Rushing		
Buffalo	Receiving		
Ball State	Passing		
Ball State	Rushing		
Ball State	Receiving		

=== at Ohio ===
Ball State Cardinals (3–7) at Ohio Bobcats (7–3) – Game summary

Quarter	1	2	3	4	Total
Cardinals	3	17	0	8	28
Bobcats	7	7	0	21	35

at Peden Stadium • Athens, Ohio

- Date: November 17
- Game time: 7:00 p.m.
- Game weather: sunny, Temperature:40 °F (4 °C), Wind:CALM 0 mph (0 km/h)
- Game attendance: 12,237
- Referee: Marcel Kerr (MAC)
- TV announcers (CBSSN): John Sadak (play-by-play) and Taylor McHargue (analyst)

Game information

First quarter
Second quarter
Third quarter
Fourth quarter

Statistics	BALL	OHIO
First downs	22	24
Total yards	69–448	56–365
Rushing yards	34–191	39–186
Passing yards	257	179
Passing: Comp–Att–Int	20–35–1	12–17–1
Time of possession	28:38	31:22

Team	Category	Player	Statistics
Ball State	Passing	Keldric Luster	20/33, 257 yards, 2 TD, INT
Ball State	Rushing	Keldric Luster	16 carries, 109 yards
Ball State	Receiving	Eli Hohlt	4 receptions, 112 yards, TD
Ohio	Passing	Nick Poulos	9/13, 155 yards, TD, INT
Ohio	Rushing	Victor Rosa	12 carries, 65 yards
Ohio	Receiving	Riley Neer	5 receptions, 92 yards

=== Central Michigan ===
Central Michigan Chippewas (5–6) at Ball State Cardinals (3–8) – Game summary

Quarter	1	2	3	4	Total
Chippewas	0	0	0	0	0
Cardinals	0	0	0	0	0

at Scheumann Stadium • Muncie, Indiana

- Date: November 28
- Game time: 12:00 p.m.

Statistics	CMU	BALL
First downs		
Plays–yards		
Rushes–yards		
Passing yards		
Passing: comp–att–int		
Turnovers		
Time of possession		

Team	Category	Player	Statistics
Central Michigan	Passing		
Central Michigan	Rushing		
Central Michigan	Receiving		
Ball State	Passing		
Ball State	Rushing		
Ball State	Receiving		
