= Brock Boyd =

American football player

No. 11 – Ohio State Buckeyes
- Position: Wide receiver
- Class: Freshman

Personal information
- Listed height: 6 ft 1 in (1.85 m)
- Listed weight: 196 lb (89 kg)

Career information
- High school: Carroll Senior (Southlake, Texas)
- College: Ohio State (2026–present)
- Stats at ESPN

Brock Boyd is an American football wide receiver for the Ohio State Buckeyes.

== Early life ==
Boyd attended Carroll Senior High School in Southlake, Texas, where he was a three-year starter and standout receiver for the Dragons. He finished his high school career with 260 receptions, 4,186 total yards, and 46 touchdowns, becoming Carroll Senior's all-time receiving yards leader, a record previously held by former BYU wide receiver McKay Jacobson. A three-star prospect, Boyd received offers from schools such as Tennessee, Oregon, and Ole Miss among others. He originally committed to play for TCU, but switched to Ohio State prior to his senior season.

== College career ==
Enrolling at Ohio State, Boyd entered a competitive receiving room with teammates such as Chris Henry Jr. and Jeremiah Smith, but was highly touted by head coach Ryan Day for his productivity and work ethic during spring practices, becoming the team's first freshman to lose their black stripe.

== Personal life ==
Boyd's brother, Brady, played for the Utah State Aggies.
