= Devin McCuin =

American football player (born 2005)

No. 3 – Ohio State Buckeyes
- Position: Wide receiver
- Class: Senior

Personal information
- Born: May 21, 2005 (age 21)
- Listed height: 6 ft 0 in (1.83 m)
- Listed weight: 189 lb (86 kg)

Career information
- High school: Jacksonville (Jacksonville, Texas)
- College: UTSA (2023–2025); Ohio State (2026–present)

Awards and highlights
- Third-team All-AAC (2025)
- Stats at ESPN

Devin McCuin (born May 21, 2005) is an American football wide receiver for the Ohio State Buckeyes. He previously played for the UTSA Roadrunners.

== Early life ==
McCuin attended Jacksonville High School in Jacksonville, Texas. During his junior season, he caught 63 passes for 890 yards and nine touchdowns. McCuin received offers from schools such as North Texas, TCU, Texas State, and UTSA. He committed to play college football for the UTSA Roadrunners.

== College career ==
=== UTSA ===
In week 3 of the 2023 season, McCuin caught a 72-yard touchdown for his first collegiate touchdown in a win over Army. As a freshman in 2023, he recorded 42 receptions for 546 yards and three touchdowns. In 2024, McCuin totaled 45 receptions for 424 yards and five touchdowns. He finished the 2025 season with 65 catches for 726 yards and eight touchdowns, earning third-team all-conference honors, after which he entered the NCAA transfer portal.

=== Ohio State ===
McCuin transferred to play for the Ohio State Buckeyes. In week one of the 2026 season, he hauled in six passes for 97 yards and a touchdown in a win over Ball State.

=== Statistics ===
Year	Team	Receiving				Rushing			
Year	Team	Rec	Yds	Avg	TD	Car	Yds	Avg	TD
2023	UTSA	42	546	13.0	3	1	10	10.0	0
2024	UTSA	45	424	9.4	5	3	28	9.3	0
2025	UTSA	65	726	11.2	8	2	11	5.5	0
2026	Ohio State	6	97	16.2	1	0	0	0.0	0
Total		158	1,793	11.3	17	6	49	8.2	0
