= Demarcus Henry =

American basketball player

AZ Compass Prep
- Position: Small forward

Personal information
- Born: October 30, 2008 (age 18)
- Listed height: 6 ft 7 in (2.01 m)
- Listed weight: 190 lb (86 kg)

Career information
- High school: Withrow (Cincinnati, Ohio); Mater Dei (Santa Ana, California); AZ Compass Prep (Chandler, Arizona)
Medals
Men's basketball
Representing the United States
FIBA U18 AmeriCup
Silver medal – second place	2026 Léon	Team

Demarcus Henry (born October 30, 2008) is an American basketball player at AZ Compass Prep in Chandler, Arizona. He is a five-star prospect and one of the top recruits in the class of 2027.

== Early life ==
Henry was born on October 30, 2008. He is one of three children born to Chris Henry, who played in the NFL for the Cincinnati Bengals. His brother, Chris Jr., plays football for the Ohio State Buckeyes, while his sister, Seini, plays basketball for Ohio State. His father died in 2009, and his father's teammate Adam Jones helped raise him and his siblings. Henry grew up playing basketball and football.

Henry first played high school basketball at Withrow High School in Cincinnati, Ohio. Midway through his freshman year, he and his brother transferred to Mater Dei High School in Santa Ana, California. He averaged 14.8 points for Mater Dei as a sophomore, second on the team. Henry also had 6.9 rebounds and 2.3 assists per game, earning third-team all-county honors while helping the team to a record of 22–9.

Henry transferred to AZ Compass Prep in Chandler, Arizona, for his junior season. He was also a top player for Team Why Not of the Nike Elite Youth Basketball League (EYBL), averaging 11.5 points and 7.0 rebounds in 11 regular season games in 2025. At Compass Prep in the 2025–26 season, Henry averaged 24 points per game.

Henry is a consensus five-star recruit and one of the top prospects in the class of 2027. He is ranked among the top five prospects nationally by 247Sports, ESPN and Rivals.com. On October 30, 2026, Henry committed to play college basketball at North Carolina.

== International career ==
Henry attended the U.S. junior national team minicamp in Colorado in October 2025. He was selected for the U.S. national under-18 basketball team in 2026 and competed at the 2026 FIBA U18 AmeriCup, appearing in five games while averaging 3.0 points and 2.6 rebounds as the U.S. finished in second place.
