= Earl Little =

American football player (born 1973)

No. 20, 21
- Position: Safety

Personal information
- Born: March 10, 1973 (age 53); Miami, Florida, U.S.
- Listed height: 6 ft 0 in (1.83 m)
- Listed weight: 202 lb (92 kg)

Career information
- High school: North Miami Senior
- College: Michigan; Miami (FL)
- NFL draft: 1997: undrafted

Career history
- Miami Dolphins (1997)*; New Orleans Saints (1997–1999); Cleveland Browns (1999–2004); Green Bay Packers (2005)
- * Offseason or practice squad member only

Career NFL statistics
- Tackles: 304
- Sacks: 1.0
- Forced fumbles: 2
- Fumble recoveries: 2
- Interceptions: 18
- Stats at Pro Football Reference

Earl Jerome Little (born March 10, 1973) is an American former professional football player who was a safety in the National Football League (NFL) for nine years from 1997 to 2005 with the New Orleans Saints, Cleveland Browns, and Green Bay Packers. Little played college football for the Miami Hurricanes.

== Professional career ==
Pre-draft measurables
| Height | Weight | Arm length | Hand span | 40-yard dash | 10-yard split | 20-yard split | 20-yard shuttle | Three-cone drill | Vertical jump | Broad jump | Bench press |
|---|---|---|---|---|---|---|---|---|---|---|---|
| 5 ft 11 3/4 in (1.82 m) | 183 lb (83 kg) | 31 3/4 in (0.81 m) | 9 3/4 in (0.25 m) | 4.62 s | 1.61 s | 2.72 s | 4.49 s | 7.58 s | 31.5 in (0.80 m) | 9 ft 5 in (2.87 m) | 2 reps |
All values from NFL Combine

=== New Orleans Saints ===
Little was signed as an undrafted free agent before the 1997 NFL season by the Miami Dolphins, and later joined the New Orleans Saints. He started on special teams and was a backup cornerback. His special teams coach, Bobby April, always praised Little outstanding special teams play. During the third preseason game vs the Denver Broncos, he made a big hit and he was taken off the field because of a concussion. Little missed the last preseason game and the first three games of the 1999 season. He was released by the Saints on October 24, 1999.

=== Cleveland Browns ===
He was picked up by the Browns off Waivers from the Saints on October 26, 1999. After having an outstanding season, Little signed a three-year multimillion-dollar contract. After having three good seasons (2001–2003), the Browns rewarded him with a five-year multimillion-dollar contract. He spent six seasons with the Browns until being released on 1 April 2005.

=== Green Bay Packers ===
Little was signed as a free agent on April 15, 2005. Little pulled his hamstring on October 4, 2005, on Monday Night Football vs Carolina Panthers. He was placed on injured reserve. To make room for a roster spot, he was released on November 23, 2005. Even though he was done for the remainder of the season, Little received his full salary for the 2005 season.

== Personal life ==
Little's son, Earl Little Jr. is a safety for Ohio State.
