= Brady Boyd (American football) =

American football player (born 2002)

No. 84 – Miami Dolphins
- Position: Wide receiver
- Roster status: Practice squad

Personal information
- Born: June 6, 2002 (age 24)
- Listed height: 6 ft 1 in (1.85 m)
- Listed weight: 195 lb (88 kg)

Career information
- High school: Carroll Senior (Southlake, Texas)
- College: Minnesota (2021); Texas Tech (2022–2024); Utah State (2025)
- NFL draft: 2026: undrafted

Career history
- Jacksonville Jaguars (2026)*; Miami Dolphins (2026–present)*
- * Offseason or practice squad member only

Brady Boyd (born June 6, 2002) is an American football wide receiver for the Miami Dolphins of the National Football League (NFL). He played college football for the Minnesota Golden Gophers, Texas Tech Red Raiders, and for the Utah State Aggies.

== Early life ==
Boyd attended Carroll Senior High School in Southlake, Texas, and committed to play college football for the Minnesota Golden Gophers.

== College career ==
=== Minnesota ===
As a freshman in 2021, Boyd recorded two receptions for 18 yards. After the conclusion of the season, he entered the NCAA transfer portal.

=== Texas Tech ===
Boyd transferred to play for the Texas Tech Red Raiders. In first season as a Red Raider in 2022, he played in 12 games, hauling in 13 passes for 125 yards and a touchdown. During the 2023 season, Boyd took a redshirt, recording five receptions in two starts. In 2024, he notched just one reception for seven yards in 11 games. After the season, Boyd once again entered the NCAA transfer portal.

=== Utah State ===
Boyd transferred to play for the Utah State Aggies. In week 2 of the 2025 season, he hauled in six passes for 87 yards in a loss against Texas A&M Aggies. Boyd finished the 2025 season with 46 receptions for 743 yards and eight touchdowns.

== Professional career ==
Pre-draft measurables
Height	Weight	Arm length	Hand span	Wingspan	40-yard dash	10-yard split	20-yard split	20-yard shuttle	Three-cone drill	Vertical jump	Broad jump	Bench press
6 ft 1 3/8 in (1.86 m)	201 lb (91 kg)	30 3/4 in (0.78 m)	9 in (0.23 m)	6 ft 2 3/4 in (1.90 m)	4.39 s	1.54 s	2.56 s	4.38 s	6.97 s	40.0 in (1.02 m)	10 ft 10 in (3.30 m)	9 reps
All values from Pro Day

=== Jacksonville Jaguars ===
After not being selected in the 2026 NFL draft, Boyd signed with the Jacksonville Jaguars as an undrafted free agent. On August 30, he was waived by Jacksonville as a part of final roster cuts.

=== Miami Dolphins ===
On November 17, 2026, Boyd signed with the Miami Dolphins practice squad.

== Personal life ==
Boyd's brother, Brock, plays for the Ohio State Buckeyes.
