= George Washington Carver High School (Montgomery, Alabama) =

Public high school in Montgomery, Alabama, United States

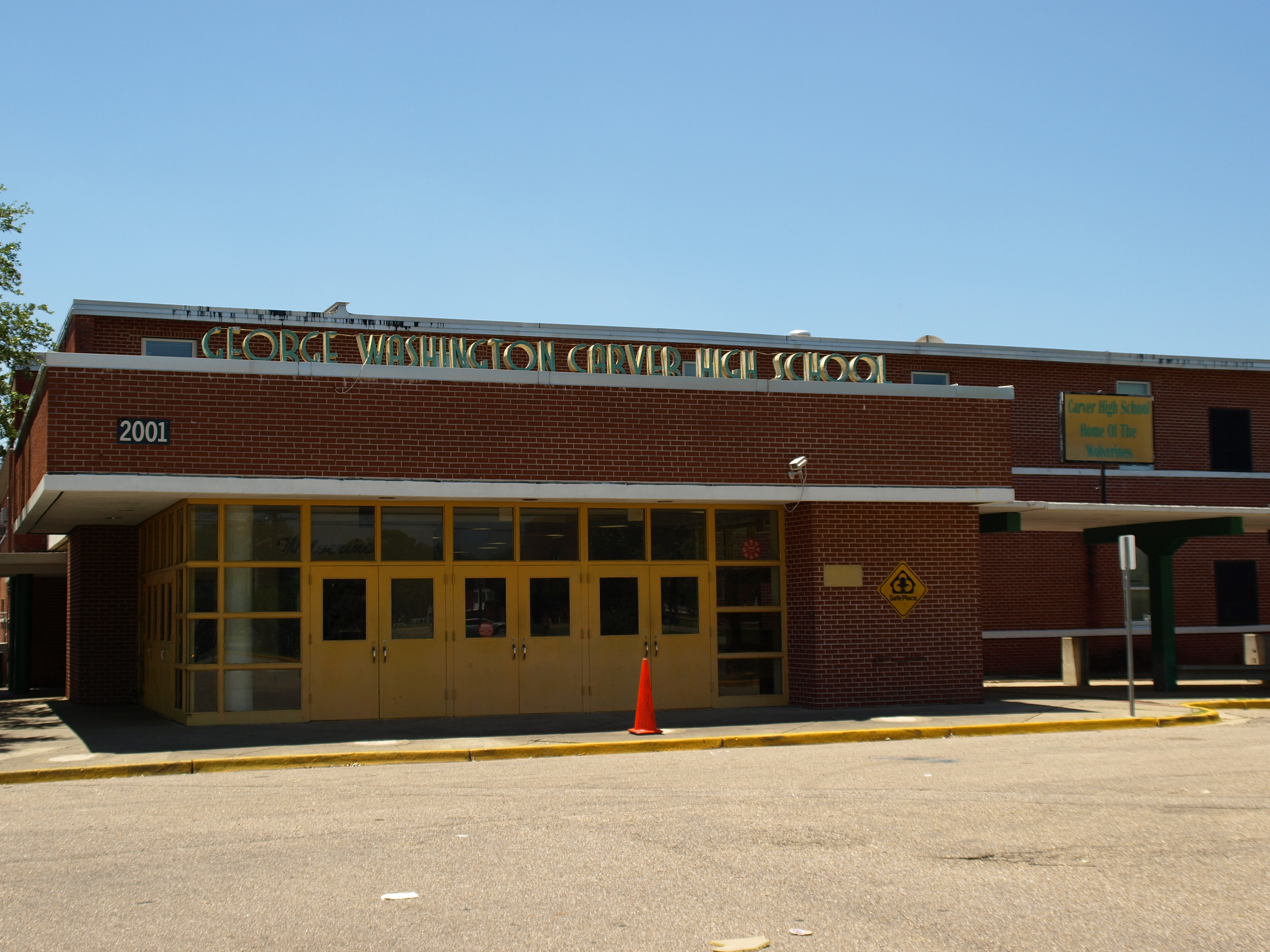

Location
- 2001 W. Fairview Avenue; Montgomery, Alabama 36108; United States; 32°21′1″N 86°19′30″W

Information
- Type: Public
- School district: Montgomery Public Schools
- CEEB code: 012487
- Principal: Gary Hall
- Teaching staff: 74.50 (on an FTE basis)
- Grades: 9-12
- Enrollment: 1,553 (2024-2025)
- Student to teacher ratio: 20.85
- Colors: Green and gold
- Nickname: Wolverines
- Communities served: Maxwell Air Force Base main post
- Website: www.mps.k12.al.us/o/carverhigh

George Washington Carver High School is a public high school in Montgomery, Alabama. It is a part of the Montgomery Public Schools system.

The groundbreaking for a new Carver High School building was held April 2, 2008, at the construction site just off Oak Street across from the existing school. Its design utilizes modern advances in architecture, construction and technology. The $36 million school is the first of six new schools scheduled in the first phase of the MPS building program. The Carver High School ribbon cutting ceremony was held in August 2010 with the school serving approximately 1,200 students.

Carver serves residents of the main section of Maxwell Air Force Base.

== History ==
George Washington Carver High School began in September 1949 as a vocational school to a majority black community. Clarence M. Dannelly, then superintendent of Montgomery Public Schools, held the ground breaking ceremony on Fairview Avenue on April 13, 1949.

The school opened on January 4, 1949. At that time there were 24 classrooms, an office suite, and a lunchroom which also served as an auditorium. There were 875 students and 23 faculty members including principal, M. H. Griffin, a graduate of the University of Michigan. This connection is why Carver High School adopted the wolverine as its mascot. The curriculum consisted of the basic subjects and physical education.

In subsequent years, Carver was expanded both physically and academically. Eight classrooms were added from 1951–1952. An elementary unit, consisting of 20 rooms and a gymnasium were added from 1952−1953. By 1959, the enrollment had increased to nearly 1,700 students and an 18-room extension was added. This extension consisted of science labs, home-making rooms, mechanic shops and workshops.

In 1982, the Carver Creative and Performing Arts Center (CCPAC) was created.

== Athletics ==
In 1964, Carver won the negro AAA (the largest division at the time) state football championship in 1964 with a record of 9-0-1, defeating Cobb Avenue of Anniston.

Carver won the 4A state championship in both 1978 and 1979. Carver High School won the Class 6A Basketball state championship title for 2012 and 2015. It also earned a regional title in 2009.

== Notable alumni ==
- Willie Alexander, NFL player
- Caesar Belser, NFL player
- Tom Boswell, former National Basketball Association player
- Byron Braggs, NFL player
- Milford Brown, NFL player
- Aundray Bruce, former NFL linebacker
- Oscar Gamble, former MLB player
- Shaun Dion Hamilton, NFL player
- Terry Hardy, NFL player
- Jeremy Johnson, college quarterback
- Merlakia Jones, former Women's National Basketball Association player
- Qua Russaw, linebacker for the Ohio State Buckeyes
- Chris Relf, American football quarterback
- James Smith, defensive tackle for the Ohio State Buckeyes
- Craig Sword, NBA player who played for the Washington Wizards
- Fernandus Vinson, NFL player
- Mack Wilson, NFL player

== See also ==
- Booker T. Washington School (Montgomery, Alabama)
