= Tavien St. Clair =

American football player (born 2006)

No. 9 – Ohio State Buckeyes
- Position: Quarterback
- Class: Redshirt Freshman

Personal information
- Born: June 23, 2006 (age 20); Bellefontaine, Ohio, U.S.
- Listed height: 6 ft 4 in (1.93 m)
- Listed weight: 230 lb (104 kg)

Career information
- High school: Bellefontaine (Bellefontaine, Ohio)
- College: Ohio State (2025–present)

Tavien St. Clair (born June 23, 2006) is an American college football quarterback for the Ohio State Buckeyes.

== Early life ==
St. Clair attended Bellefontaine High School in Bellefontaine, Ohio. He had 2,453 passing yards and 25 touchdowns as a sophomore in 2022 and 3,083 passing yards and 37 touchdowns as a junior in 2023. In June 2024, he was named the MVP of the Rivals Five Star Camp. He also participated in the Elite 11 quarterback competition.

A five-star recruit, St. Clair is rated as the number one overall recruit in the 2025 class by Rivals.com. He is committed to Ohio State University to play college football.

== College career ==
St. Clair began the 2025 season as the third-string quarterback behind Julian Sayin and Lincoln Kienholz as a true freshman. He made his collegiate debut in a Week 2 victory over Grambling State, completing his only appearance of the season while preserving his redshirt.

St. Clair returned for the 2026 season as a redshirt freshman and competed with Luke Fahey and Justyn Martin for the primary backup role behind Sayin. In a season opening win over Ball State, St. Clair entered the game after Sayin and Fahey, completing five of six passes for 52 yards and his first collegiate touchdown, a 15-yard pass to Chris Henry Jr..

=== Statistics ===
Year	Team	Games			Passing								Rushing			
Year	Team	GP	GS	Record	Cmp	Att	Pct	Yds	Y/A	TD	Int	Rtg	Att	Yds	Avg	TD
2025	Ohio State	1	0	—	0	2	0.0	0	0.0	0	0	0.0	0	0	0.0	0
2026	Ohio State	2	0	0–0	5	7	71.4	52	7.4	1	1	152.1	2	8	4.0	0
Career		3	0	0–0	5	9	55.6	52	5.8	1	1	118.5	2	8	4.0	0
