= Armani Watts =

American gridiron football player (born 1996)

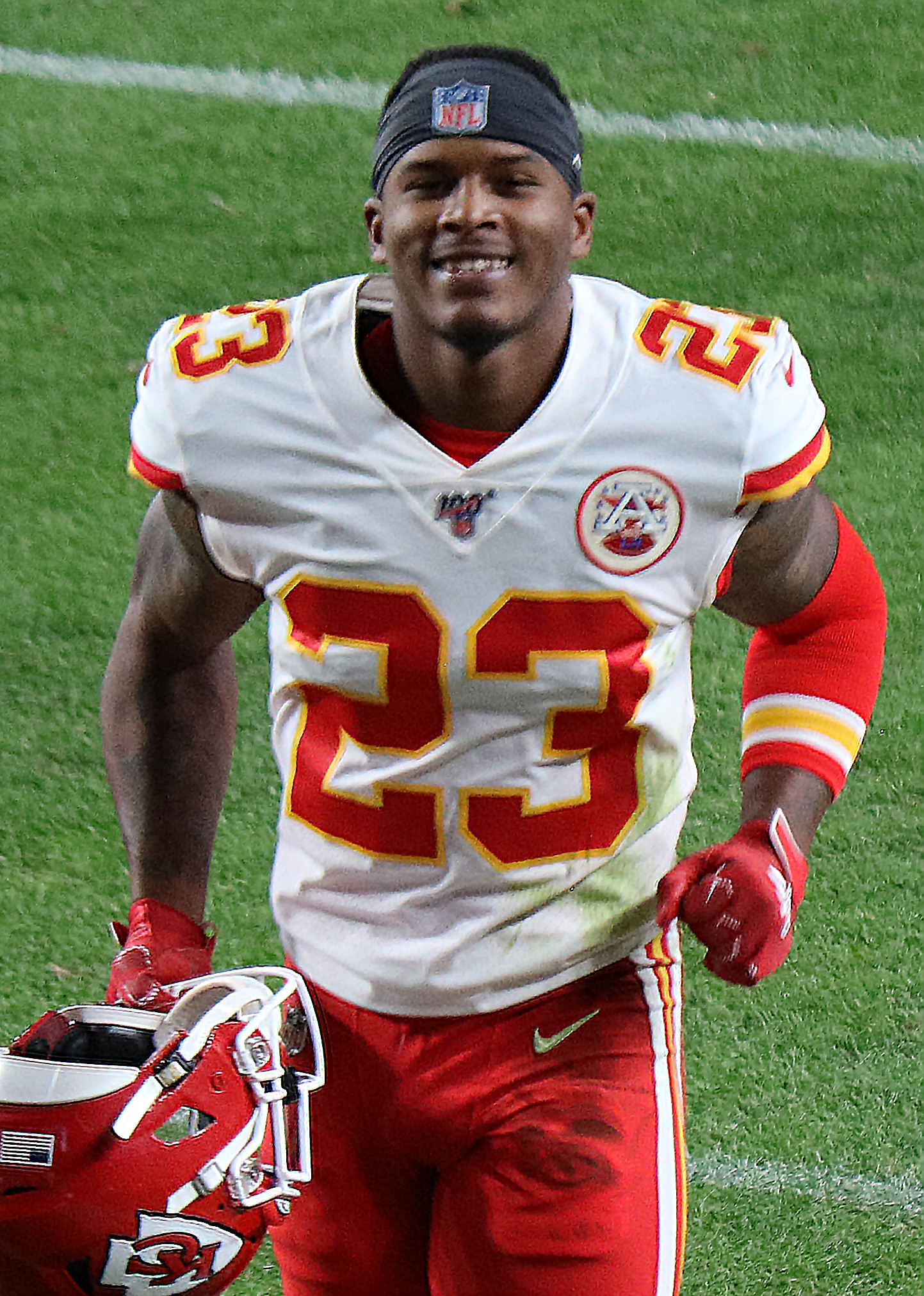
- Watts with the Kansas City Chiefs in 2019

Profile
- Position: Defensive back

Personal information
- Born: March 19, 1996 (age 30); Richmond, California, U.S.
- Listed height: 5 ft 11 in (1.80 m)
- Listed weight: 205 lb (93 kg)

Career information
- High school: North Forney (Forney, Texas)
- College: Texas A&M
- NFL draft: 2018: 4th round, 124th overall pick

Career history
- Kansas City Chiefs (2018–2021); Indianapolis Colts (2022); Toronto Argonauts (2025)*
- * Offseason or practice squad member only

Awards and highlights
- Super Bowl champion (LIV)

Career NFL statistics
- Total tackles: 58
- Sacks: 2
- Fumble recoveries: 1
- Pass deflections: 2
- Stats at Pro Football Reference
- Stats at CFL.ca

Armani Watts (born March 19, 1996) is an American professional football defensive back. He played college football at Texas A&M and was selected by the Kansas City Chiefs in the fourth round of the 2018 NFL draft.

== Early life ==
Watts attended and played high school football at North Forney High School.

== College career ==
Watts attended and played college football at Texas A&M from 2014 to 2017 under head coach Kevin Sumlin. He was a four-year starter for the Aggies and led the team in interceptions as a freshman. In 2017, he started 12 games, had 87 tackles, 10 for loss, four interceptions, five pass breakups, two fumble recoveries and two blocked kicks. Watts was an All-Southeastern Conference selection and third-team All-America.

== Professional career ==
Pre-draft measurables
| Height | Weight | Arm length | Hand span | Wingspan | 40-yard dash | 10-yard split | 20-yard split | 20-yard shuttle | Three-cone drill | Vertical jump | Broad jump | Bench press |
|---|---|---|---|---|---|---|---|---|---|---|---|---|
| 5 ft 10 1/2 in (1.79 m) | 202 lb (92 kg) | 31 in (0.79 m) | 8 3/4 in (0.22 m) | 6 ft 0 3/8 in (1.84 m) | 4.64 s | 1.64 s | 2.66 s | 4.31 s | 7.09 s | 35.0 in (0.89 m) | 10 ft 0 in (3.05 m) | 13 reps |
All values from NFL Combine/Pro Day

=== Kansas City Chiefs ===
Watts was selected by the Kansas City Chiefs in the fourth round with the 124th overall pick in the 2018 NFL draft, using the fourth-round pick acquired in the Marcus Peters trade. In Week 4, against the Denver Broncos, he recorded his first career sack. He was placed on injured reserve on October 9, 2018, after suffering a groin injury in Week 5. Watts won Super Bowl LIV when the Chiefs defeated the San Francisco 49ers 31–20.

=== Indianapolis Colts ===
On April 5, 2022, Watts signed with the Indianapolis Colts. He was set to miss the entire 2022 season after being placed on injured reserve on August 30, 2022 with an injured ankle.

=== Toronto Argonauts ===
On February 27, 2025, Watts signed with the Toronto Argonauts. He was released by the Argonauts during training camp, on May 13, 2025.
