= James Smith (American football) =

American football player (born 2005)

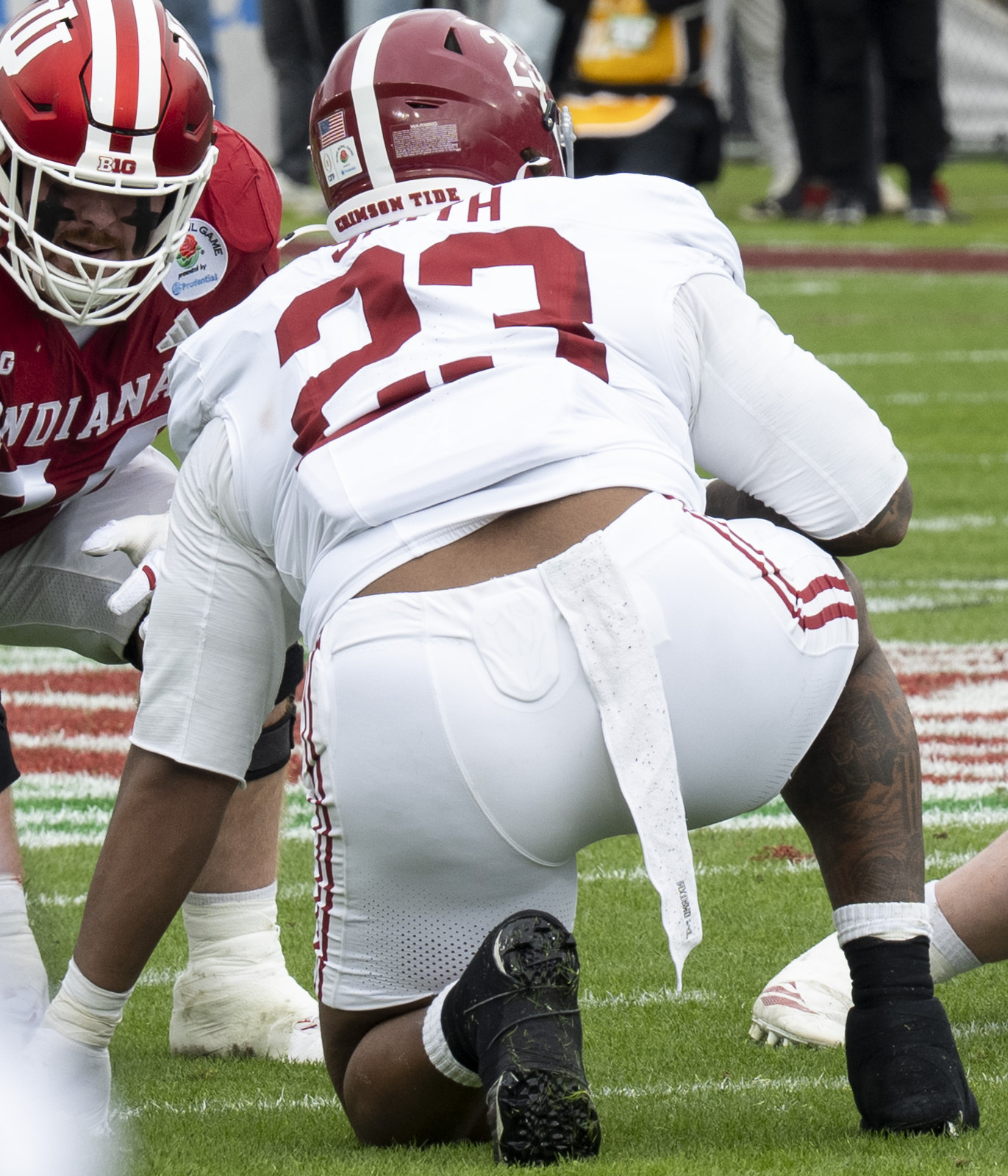
- Smith in 2026

No. 3 – Ohio State Buckeyes
- Position: Defensive tackle
- Class: Senior

Personal information
- Born: April 7, 2005 (age 21)
- Listed height: 6 ft 2 in (1.88 m)
- Listed weight: 314 lb (142 kg)

Career information
- High school: George Washington Carver (Montgomery, Alabama); IMG Academy (Bradenton, Florida)
- College: Alabama (2023–2025); Ohio State (2026–present)
- Stats at ESPN

James Smith (born April 7, 2005) is an American college football defensive tackle for the Ohio State Buckeyes. He previously played for the Alabama Crimson Tide.

== Early life ==
Smith is from Montgomery, Alabama. He attended George Washington Carver High School in Montgomery from his freshman to sophomore years, playing football as a defensive lineman and posting double-digit sacks as a sophomore while helping Carver allow only 16 points per game. He transferred to IMG Academy in Florida as a junior in 2021, but transferred back to Carver mid-way through the 2021 season. He then had to sit out the rest of the year after being ruled ineligible. He played his senior season at Carver in 2022.

Smith was ranked a five-star prospect and one of the top recruits in the class of 2023. He was ranked a top-20 player nationally and the second-best defensive line recruit by 247Sports. Smith, along with his Carver teammate Qua Russaw, committed to play college football for the Alabama Crimson Tide.

== College career ==
=== Alabama ===
Smith was a backup as a true freshman in 2023, behind Jaheim Oatis, Tim Keenan III, and Tim Smith, and posted two tackles. He then appeared in all 13 games as a sophomore in 2024, tallying 20 tackles, two pass breakups and a sack. Smith became a starter for Alabama in 2025.

=== Ohio State ===
On January 12, 2026, Smith transferred to Ohio State.
