= Jeremiah Smith (American football) =

American football player (born 2005)

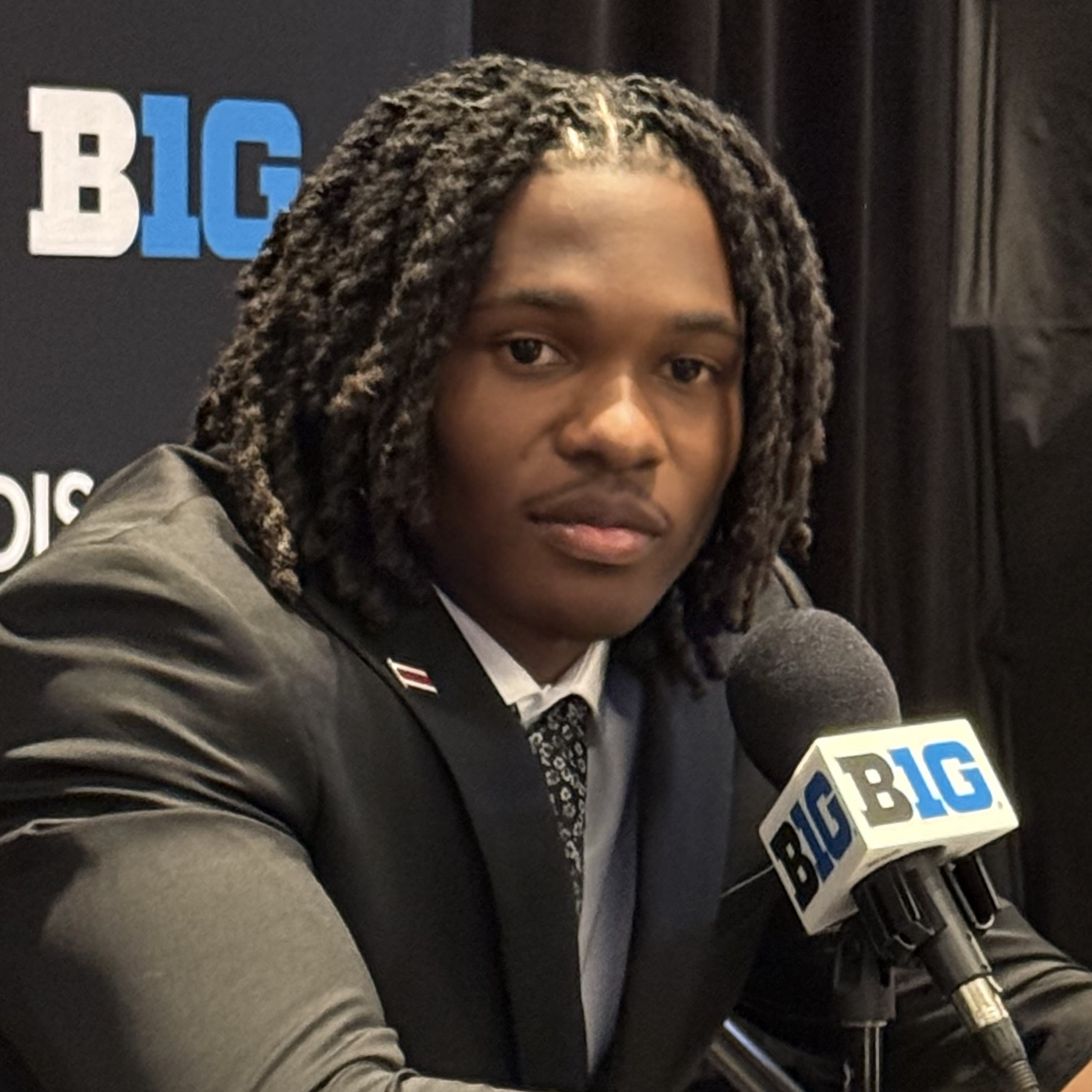
- Smith at 2026 Big Ten Media Days

No. 4 – Ohio State Buckeyes
- Position: Wide receiver
- Class: Junior

Personal information
- Born: November 29, 2005 (age 20); Miami Gardens, Florida, U.S.
- Listed height: 6 ft 4 in (1.93 m)
- Listed weight: 223 lb (101 kg)

Career information
- High school: Chaminade-Madonna (Hollywood, Florida)
- College: Ohio State (2024–present)

Awards and highlights
- CFP national champion (2024); Unanimous All-American (2025); Freshman All-American (2024); 2× Big Ten Receiver of the Year (2024, 2025); Big Ten Freshman of the Year (2024); 2× First-team All-Big Ten (2024, 2025)

Career statistics as of 2026
- Receptions: 243
- Receiving yards: 3,875
- Receiving average: 16.0
- Receiving touchdowns: 42
- Stats at ESPN

Jeremiah Javon Smith (born November 29, 2005) is an American college football wide receiver for the Ohio State Buckeyes.

Raised in South Florida, Smith played high school football at Chaminade–Madonna College Preparatory School in Hollywood, Florida, finishing his career as the highest ranked wide receiver recruit in modern recruiting history (2000–present). As a college freshman in 2024, Smith broke the NCAA Division I Football Bowl Subdivision (FBS) freshman receiving record, and won a national championship with the Buckeyes. In 2025, he was a unanimous All-American.

== Early life ==
Smith was born on November 29, 2005, in Miami Gardens, Florida. At seven years old, Smith tried out for the Miami Gardens Ravens youth football team but did not make the cut, an event hailed as a defining moment for him regarding his football career. The event caused Smith to begin taking training more seriously. Next year, he made the league, winning its own version of the Heisman Trophy. Smith later attended Miami Central Senior High School before transferring to Chaminade-Madonna College Preparatory School in Hollywood, Florida. He had 31 receptions for 667 yards and seven touchdowns in his sophomore season. He caught 58 passes for 1,073 yards and 20 touchdowns as a junior. He also won the FHSAA Class 2A state championship in the 110 and the 400-meter hurdles during his junior year. During his senior season, Smith was named an All-American and won the All-American Bowl Player of the Year Award.

Smith was rated a five-star recruit and the top ranked prospect of the 2024 college football class. He was the highest ranked wide receiver recruit in the modern recruiting era (since 2000), surpassing Dorial Green-Beckham and Julio Jones. At the 2026 Big Ten Media Days, Smith revealed that his dream growing up was to play for Alabama under Nick Saban, but the school never recruited him. Smith committed to play for Ohio State over offers from Florida, Florida State, Georgia, Miami, USC, and other top schools.

College recruiting
Name	Hometown	School	Height	Weight	Commit date
Jeremiah Smith; WR	Opa Locka, FL	Chaminade-Madonna	6 ft 3 in (1.91 m)	215 lb (98 kg)	Feb 7, 2024
Jeremiah Smith; WR	Recruit ratings: Rivals: 247Sports: ESPN:				

== College career ==
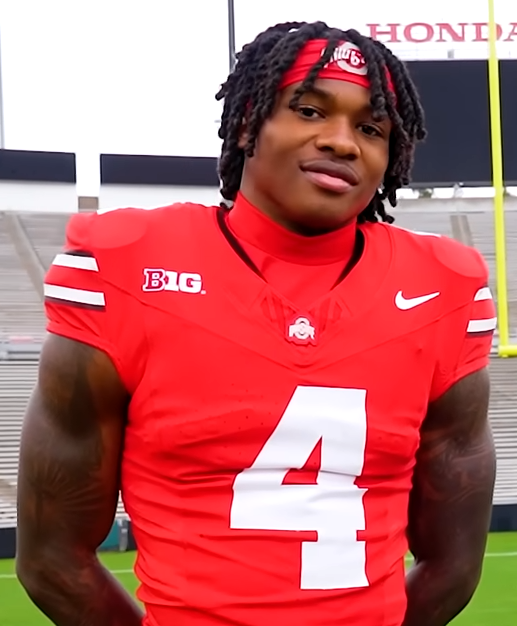
Smith with the Ohio State Buckeyes in 2025

=== Freshman year ===
In his college football debut against the Akron Zips, Smith scored both of Ohio State's first-half touchdowns in a 52–6 victory, finishing with six catches for 92 yards and two scores and becoming the first Ohio State freshman in 26 years to record two touchdown receptions in his debut. The following week, he had five catches for 119 yards and a touchdown in a 56–0 rout of Western Michigan. Smith was named Big Ten Conference Freshman of the Week after recording six touches for 102 yards and two touchdowns in a 38–7 victory over Michigan State two games later.

In the College Football Playoff first round, Smith caught six passes for 103 yards and two touchdowns in a 42–17 victory over Tennessee, becoming just the sixth freshman to record 100 receiving yards in a CFP game. On January 1, 2025, Smith had seven catches for 187 yards and two receiving touchdowns in an MVP performance against the Oregon Ducks in the Rose Bowl. He was also named the Big Ten Freshman of the Year and Big Ten Receiver of the Year, selected as a Freshman All-American by the Football Writers Association of America (FWAA), and named a first-team All-American by unofficial NCAA selectors USA Today and ESPN in 2024. Smith was the lead receiver during the Buckeyes' victory in the 2025 College Football Playoff National Championship, during which he set the FBS single-season record for receiving yards and touchdowns by a true freshman. He finished the 2024 season with 76 receptions for 1,315 receiving yards and 15 receiving touchdowns to go with a rushing touchdown.

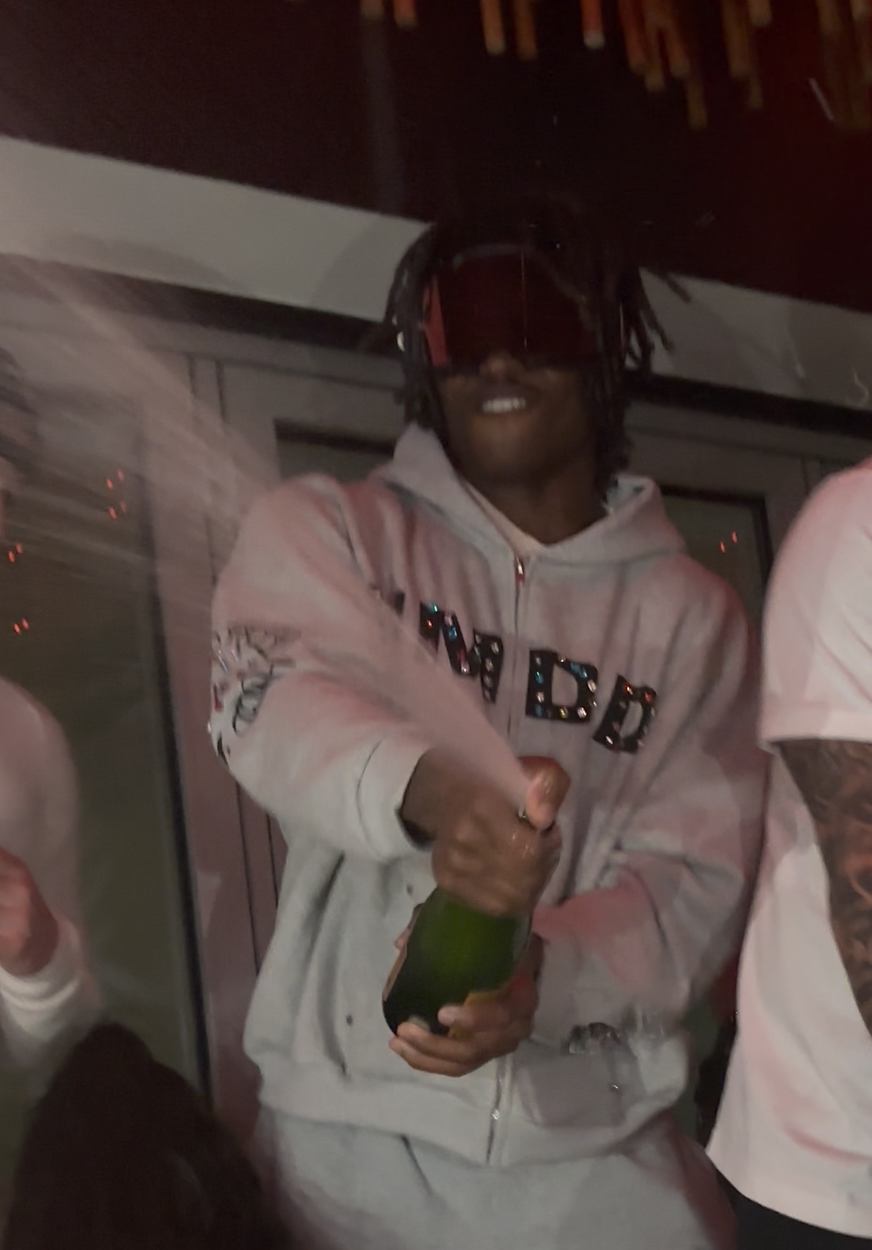
Smith celebrating the Buckeyes victory in the 2025 CFP National Championship Game

=== Sophomore year ===
In Week 2 of his sophomore season against Grambling State, Smith had five catches for 115 yards, along with 2 touchdowns. One of his touchdowns, which went for 87 yards, was the longest Ohio State pass play ever at Ohio Stadium. The following week against Ohio, he had nine receptions for 153 yards and a touchdown, while also adding a 17-yard rushing touchdown.

Against Penn State in Week 10, Smith made what was described as a "circus catch" against the Nittany Lions. On an 11-yard pass from quarterback Julian Sayin, Smith caught a tipped ball with one hand for a touchdown, a play that highlighted the Buckeyes' dominance in the 38-14 win. He finished the game with six receptions for 123 yards and two touchdowns. The following week against Purdue, Smith had 10 catches for 137 yards and a touchdown in a 34–10 victory over the Boilermakers.

Smith recorded eight receptions for 144 yards in a 13–10 loss to Indiana in the Big Ten Championship Game. In the Cotton Bowl, he had seven receptions for 157 yards and a touchdown in a 24–14 loss to Miami. Smith repeated as Big Ten Receiver of the Year and earned unanimous All-American honors. He finished the 2025 season with 87 receptions for 1,243 receiving yards and 12 receiving touchdowns to go with a rushing touchdown.

=== Junior year ===
In the season opener against Ball State, Smith caught eight passes for 151 yards and two touchdowns—all in the first half—as his team cruised to a 56–3 victory over the Cardinals. The following week against Texas, he had eight catches for 164 yards and a touchdown in a 24–23 loss. Against Kent State in Week 3, Smith caught a 23-yard pass from quarterback Julian Sayin, which led to him passing Michael Jenkins to become the Buckeyes' all-time leader in career receiving yards. The following week, he had 12 catches for 217 yards and four touchdowns in a 42–19 victory over Illinois, earning Big Ten and National Player of the Week honors.

In Week 5 against Iowa, Smith had 11 catches for 206 yards and two touchdowns in a 31–14 victory, becoming Ohio State's all-time leader in both receptions and receiving touchdowns. In Week 6 against Maryland, he recorded four receptions for 93 yards and two touchdowns, including an impressive one-handed catch, becoming the first Ohio State player to record 10 receiving touchdowns in three different seasons as the Buckeyes won 45–16. In Week 7, Smith caught his 39th career touchdown, tying Braylon Edwards' Big Ten record, as his team defeated Indiana 19–15 to snap the Hoosiers' 22-game winning streak.

=== Statistics ===
Legend
	School record
**Bold**	Career high

Season	Team	Games		Receiving				Rushing			
Season	Team	GP	GS	Rec	Yds	Avg	TD	Att	Yds	Avg	TD
2024	Ohio State	**16**	**15**	76	1,315	17.3	**15**	**6**	**47**	**7.8**	**1**
2025	Ohio State	13	13	**87**	1,243	14.3	12	3	21	7.0	**1**
2026	Ohio State	10	10	80	**1,317**	17.4	15	2	7	3.5	0
Career		39	38	243	3,875	16.0	42	11	75	6.8	2

== Endorsements ==
In September 2024, Smith became the first college football athlete to sign an NIL deal with Red Bull. In July 2025, he signed an NIL endorsement agreement with Adidas to appear in brand marketing campaigns.

== Personal life ==
Jeremiah Smith is the cousin of Geno Smith, quarterback of the New York Jets of the National Football League (NFL). Chip Kelly, who recruited Geno from Miramar High School in Miramar, Florida, later coached Jeremiah at Ohio State University before joining the Las Vegas Raiders as offensive coordinator, where he coached Geno.

Smith was one of the cover athletes for EA Sports College Football 26 alongside Ryan Coleman-Williams.
