= Christian Alliegro =

American football player

- Alliegro (wearing the number 28) after an October 2024 game with the Wisconsin Badgers

No. 14 – Ohio State Buckeyes
- Position: Linebacker
- Class: Senior

Personal information
- Listed height: 6 ft 4 in (1.93 m)
- Listed weight: 241 lb (109 kg)

Career information
- High school: Avon Old Farms (Avon, Connecticut) Darien (Darien, Connecticut)
- College: Wisconsin (2023–2025); Ohio State (2026–present)
- Stats at ESPN

Christian Alliegro is an American football linebacker for the Ohio State Buckeyes. He previously played for the Wisconsin Badgers.

== Early life ==
Alliegro attended Avon Old Farms School in Avon, Connecticut, and Darien High School in Darien, Connecticut where he was both a football and lacrosse standout, and initially committed to play college lacrosse for the Navy Midshipmen. However, he decided to forgo lacrosse and signed to play college football for the Wisconsin Badgers.

== College career ==
=== Wisconsin ===
As a freshman in 2023, Alliegro played in all 13 games, recording five tackles and a sack. In week 10 of the 2024 season, Alliegro notched 16 tackles in a loss to Iowa. In week 12, he tallied ten tackles in a loss to top-ranked Oregon. Alliegro finished the 2024 season with 66 tackles with five being for a loss and three sacks. In week 9 of the 2025 season, he broke his arm in a loss to Ohio State, but continued playing, posting six tackles with two being for a loss. Alliegro finished the 2025 season with 53 tackles with eight going for a loss and four sacks. After the conclusion of the season, he entered the NCAA transfer portal.

=== Ohio State ===
Alliegro transferred to play for the Ohio State Buckeyes.
