= Luke Fahey =

American football player

No. 13 – Ohio State Buckeyes
- Position: Quarterback
- Class: Freshman

Personal information
- Listed height: 5 ft 11 in (1.80 m)
- Listed weight: 206 lb (93 kg)

Career information
- High school: Mission Viejo (Mission Viejo, California)
- College: Ohio State (2026–present)
- Stats at ESPN

Luke Fahey is an American college football quarterback for the Ohio State Buckeyes.

== Early life ==
Fahey is from Mission Viejo, California. He attended Mission Viejo High School where he competed in football, lacrosse and basketball. He became his team's starting quarterback as a sophomore and helped them to the CIF State Division 1-AA championship while throwing for 2,184 yards and 26 touchdowns. The next year, Fahey threw for 1,638 yards and 17 touchdowns with no interceptions. He was named the Orange County Register Offensive Player of the Year and the Los Angeles Times Back of the Year as a senior after throwing for 3,199 yards and 25 touchdowns, while Mission Viejo won the Alpha League championship.

Fahey, in his high school career, threw for 7,021 yards and 68 touchdowns with nine interceptions while also running for 1,567 yards and 19 scores. He was ranked a three-star recruit in the class of 2026. He committed to play college football for the Ohio State Buckeyes.

== College career ==
Fahey competed with Tavien St. Clair to be Ohio State's backup quarterback in 2026. In the season-opener, a 56–3 win against the Ball State Cardinals, he came in for Julian Sayin in the second half and completed five of six passes for 62 yards and a touchdown with an interception. Fahey entered the fourth quarter of the Indiana Hoosiers game after Sayin suffered a shoulder injury. Fahey then started the next two games against the USC Trojans and the Oregon Ducks.

=== Statistics ===
| Year | Team | Games | | | Passing | | | | | | | | Rushing | | | |
| Year | Team | GP | GS | Record | Cmp | Att | Pct | Yds | Y/A | TD | Int | Rtg | Att | Yds | Avg | TD |
|---|---|---|---|---|---|---|---|---|---|---|---|---|---|---|---|---|
| 2026 | Ohio State | 6 | 3 | 1–2 | 87 | 133 | 65.4 | 1,024 | 7.7 | 8 | 4 | 143.9 | 19 | 15 | 0.8 | 0 |
| Career | | 6 | 3 | 1–2 | 87 | 133 | 65.4 | 1,024 | 7.7 | 8 | 4 | 143.9 | 19 | 15 | 0.8 | 0 |
