= Cam Calhoun =

American football player (born 2004)

No. 18 – Ohio State Buckeyes
- Position: Cornerback
- Class: Redshirt Junior

Personal information
- Born: October 2, 2004 (age 22)
- Listed height: 6 ft 0 in (1.83 m)
- Listed weight: 176 lb (80 kg)

Career information
- High school: Winton Woods (Cincinnati, Ohio)
- College: Michigan (2023); Utah (2024); Alabama (2025); Ohio State (2026–present)
- Stats at ESPN

Cameron Calhoun (born October 2, 2004) is an American college football cornerback for the Ohio State Buckeyes. He previously played for the Michigan Wolverines, Utah Utes and Alabama Crimson Tide.

== Early life ==
Calhoun attended Winton Woods High School in Cincinnati, Ohio, and was rated as a three-star recruit. He held over 20 NCAA Division I offers, which he trimmed to a final four of Boston College, Georgia Tech, Kentucky, and West Virginia. Calhoun initially committed to play for the West Virginia Mountaineers, and the Cincinnati Bearcats. After two de-commitments, he made his final decision to play college football for the Michigan Wolverines.

== College career ==
=== Michigan ===
As a freshman in 2023, Calhoun appeared in two games and recorded no statistics for the Michigan Wolverines team that won a national championship that season. After the 2023 regular season, he entered the NCAA transfer portal and opted out of playing in the postseason.

=== Utah ===
Calhoun transferred to play for the Utah Utes. He entered the Utes' rotation after starter Kenan Johnson went down with a season-ending injury in the 2024 season opener. In week 3, Calhoun got his first collegiate interception in a win over Utah State. On December 10, 2024, he entered the transfer portal for a second time in as many years.

=== Alabama ===
On December 18, 2024, Calhoun announced that he would transfer to play for the Alabama Crimson Tide.

On January 4, 2026, Calhoun announced that he would enter the transfer portal.

=== Ohio State ===
On January 15, 2026, Calhoun announced that he would transfer to play for the Ohio State Buckeyes.
