= Cincere Johnson =

American football player

No. 20 – Ohio State Buckeyes
- Position: Linebacker
- Class: Freshman

Personal information
- Listed height: 6 ft 3 in (1.91 m)
- Listed weight: 228 lb (103 kg)

Career information
- High school: Glenville (Cleveland, Ohio)

Cincere Johnson is an American college football linebacker for the Ohio State Buckeyes.

== Early life ==
Johnson attended Glenville High School in Cleveland, Ohio. As a senior, he was named the USA Today High School Defensive Player of the Year. He was the All-Ohio Defensive Player of the Year both is junior and senior season. For his career, Johnson had 326 tackles and 15.5 sacks.

A four-star recruit and one of the top ranked linebackers in his class, Johnson was selected to play in the 2026 Under Armour All-America Game. He committed to play college football at the Ohio State University.
