= Kenyatta Jackson =

American football player (born 2004)

No. 2 – Ohio State Buckeyes
- Position: Defensive lineman
- Class: Redshirt Senior

Personal information
- Born: February 11, 2004 (age 22)
- Listed height: 6 ft 6 in (1.98 m)
- Listed weight: 265 lb (120 kg)

Career information
- High school: Chaminade-Madonna (Hollywood, Florida)
- College: Ohio State (2022–present)

Awards and highlights
- CFP national champion (2024)
- Stats at ESPN

Kenyatta Jackson Jr. (born February 11, 2004) is an American college football defensive end for the Ohio State Buckeyes.

== Early life ==
Jackson attended Chaminade–Madonna College Preparatory School located in Hollywood, Florida. During his senior season, he totaled 55 tackles, 17 tackles for loss, 15 quarter back hurries and 14 sacks, where for his performance he was named the Florida Gatorade Player of the Year. Coming out of high school, Jackson was rated as a four-star recruit, the 7th overall defensive end, and the 78th overall player in the class of 2022, where he committed to play college football for the Ohio State Buckeyes over offers from other schools such as Alabama, Auburn, Clemson, Florida, Florida State, Georgia Tech, Miami, North Carolina, Nebraska, Oklahoma, Oregon, and Penn State.

== College career ==
Heading into his true freshman season in 2022, Jackson lost his black stripe before the start of the season, where he chose to wear the jersey #97, which Ohio State greats like Joey Bosa, Nick Bosa, and Cameron Heyward all wore. In his freshman season in 2022 he recorded just two tackles. During the 2023 season, Jackson notched seven tackles with two being for a loss and a sack and a half. He finished the 2024 season, playing in all 16 games, recording 15 tackles and a sack and a half, as he helped the Buckeyes win the 2025 National Championship.
