= Keldric Luster =

American football player (born 2005)

No. 6 – Ball State Cardinals
- Position: Quarterback
- Class: Redshirt Junior

Personal information
- Born: February 18, 2005 (age 21)
- Listed height: 5 ft 10 in (1.78 m)
- Listed weight: 250 lb (113 kg)

Career information
- High school: McKinney (McKinney, Texas)
- College: SMU (2023–2024); Texas State (2025); Ball State (2026–present)
- Stats at ESPN

Keldric Luster (born February 18, 2005) is an American football quarterback for the Ball State Cardinals. He previously played for the SMU Mustangs and Texas State Bobcats.

== Early life ==
Luster attended McKinney High School in McKinney, Texas, and committed to play college football for the SMU Mustangs over offers from Army, Indiana, and Navy.

== College career ==
=== SMU ===
On June 1, 2023, Luster enrolled at Southern Methodist University to play for the SMU Mustangs. He joined a quarterback room that included Preston Stone, Kevin Jennings, and Alex Padilla. Luster made his collegiate debut in a Week 3 victory over Prairie View A&M, a 69–0 win. His next appearance came in a victory over Navy in the regular-season finale. He appeared in two games during the season, completing two of six passes for 23 yards and rushing twice for 12 yards. SMU finished with an 11–3 record, won the American Athletic Conference championship, and appeared in the Fenway Bowl. Luster took a redshirt for the season.

Luster returned in 2024 as the third-string quarterback behind Stone and Jennings. He appeared in five games, completing one of three passes for no yards and rushing 11 times for 50 yards. After Stone entered the transfer portal during the Mustangs' postseason run, Luster was elevated to Jennings' primary backup. He appeared in SMU's 2024 College Football Playoff first-round game against Penn State. The Mustangs finished the season with an 11–3 record after losing the 2024 ACC Championship Game and their first-round playoff game. On April 24, 2025, Luster entered the NCAA transfer portal.

=== Texas State ===
On April 29, 2025, Luster transferred to play for the Texas State Bobcats. He competed with redshirt freshman Brad Jackson and fellow transfers Holden Geriner and Nate Yarnell for the starting job. Head coach G. J. Kinne named Jackson the starter prior to the 2025 season opener against Eastern Michigan, with Luster serving as the primary backup. Luster made his Bobcats debut in the opener, relieving Jackson and leading a touchdown drive on his first possession in the 52–27 victory. His only other appearance came in a Week 4 victory over Nicholls. During the season, Luster completed one of three passes for 14 yards and rushed three times for 14 yards. Texas State finished with a 7–6 record and won the Armed Forces Bowl against Rice. On January 3, 2026, Luster entered the transfer portal for the second time.

=== Ball State ===
On January 6, 2026, Luster transferred to play for the Ball State Cardinals. He competed with fellow transfer Tyler Mizzell for the starting job, earning the position for the first time in his collegiate career. After being named the starter for the 2026 season opener against No. 1 Ohio State, Luster drew media attention for his 5-foot-10, 250-pound frame. In his first career start, Luster completed 18 of 33 passes for 89 yards and an interception in a 56–3 loss to the Buckeyes. The following week against Stony Brook, he completed 27 of 32 passes for 256 yards, three touchdowns, and an interception in a 41–17 victory. For his performance, Luster was named the Mid-American Conference Offensive Player of the Week. Luster missed the Week 4 game against Kent State due to injury. In Week 7 against Bowling Green, Luster threw a game-tying touchdown pass as time expired, then completed the game-winning two-point conversion in a 32–31 overtime victory. He finished the game with 195 passing yards, a touchdown, and a career-high 125 rushing yards on 17 carries with a rushing touchdown. The victory marked Ball State's first road win since October 12, 2024. Luster was named the Mid-American Conference Offensive Player of the Week for the second time that season, becoming the first Ball State player to win the award twice in a season since Carson Steele in 2022.

=== Statistics ===
Year	Team	Games			Passing								Rushing			
Year	Team	GP	GS	Record	Cmp	Att	Pct	Yds	Y/A	TD	Int	Rtg	Att	Yds	Avg	TD
2023	SMU	2	0	—	2	6	33.3	23	3.8	0	0	65.5	2	12	6.0	0
2024	SMU	5	0	—	1	3	33.3	0	0.0	0	0	33.3	11	50	4.5	0
2025	Texas State	2	0	—	1	3	33.3	14	7.0	0	0	72.5	3	14	4.7	0
2026	Ball State	8	8	3–5	150	238	63.0	1,482	6.2	10	6	124.2	82	278	3.4	3
Career		17	8	3−5	154	250	61.6	1,519	6.1	10	6	121.0	98	354	3.6	3
