= Jay Timmons (American football) =

American football player

No. 25 – Ohio State Buckeyes
- Position: Cornerback
- Class: Freshman

Personal information
- Listed height: 5 ft 11 in (1.80 m)
- Listed weight: 191 lb (87 kg)

Career information
- High school: Pine-Richland (Gibsonia, Pennsylvania)
- College: Ohio State (2026–present)
- Stats at ESPN

Jay Timmons is an American football cornerback for the Ohio State Buckeyes.

== Early life ==
Timmons attended Pine-Richland High School in Gibsonia, Pennsylvania. Coming out of high school, he was rated as a four-star recruit, the 17th overall cornerback, and the 136th overall player in the class of 2026 by 247Sports. Timmons committed to play college football for the Indiana Hoosiers over offers from schools such as Pittsburgh, West Virginia, Maryland, Iowa, Iowa State, Syracuse, and Wisconsin. He later flipped his commitment to play for the Florida State Seminoles. Ultimately, Timmons flipped his commitment once again to play for the Ohio State Buckeyes.

== College career ==
Timmons entered his freshman season in 2026, pushing to start in the Ohio State secondary. He was also the first Buckeye freshman to lose their black stripe.

== Personal life ==
Timmons is the son of former NFL linebacker Lawrence Timmons.
