= Khary Wilder =

American football player

No. 34 – Ohio State Buckeyes
- Position: Defensive end
- Class: Freshman

Personal information
- Listed height: 6 ft 4 in (1.93 m)
- Listed weight: 257 lb (117 kg)

Career information
- High school: Junípero Serra (Gardena, California)
- College: Ohio State (2026–present)
- Stats at ESPN

Khary Wilder Jr. is an American college football defensive end for the Ohio State Buckeyes.

== Early life ==
Wilder is from Gardena, California. He grew up playing football and basketball and attended Junípero Serra High School in Gardena, where he played football as a defensive lineman. As a sophomore, Wilder recorded 75 tackles and 14 sacks. He then had 86 tackles, 11 tackles-for-loss (TFLs) and 4.5 sacks as a junior. As a senior, Wilder recorded 91 tackles and 10 sacks.

Wilder was ranked a four-star recruit in the class of 2026. On3.com ranked him as the second-best defensive lineman recruit and a top-50 player nationally. He committed to play college football for the Ohio State Buckeyes.

== College career ==
At Ohio State, Wilder lost his "black stripe" – a team tradition making a player a "full Buckeye" eligible to play in games – in August 2026.
