= North Forney High School =

Location
- 6170 Falcon Way; Kaufman County, Texas 75126; United States; 32°45′58″N 96°24′24″W

Information
- School type: Public high school
- Motto: True North
- Established: 2009
- School district: Forney Independent School District
- NCES School ID: 481956010867
- Principal: Dr. Djara Patton
- Faculty: 163.01 (FTE)
- Grades: 9–12
- Enrollment: 2,434 (2023-24)
- Student to teacher ratio: 14.93
- Colors: Blue, black and white
- Athletics conference: UIL Class AAAAAA
- Nickname: Falcons
- Website: North Forney High School website

North Forney High School (NFHS) is a public high school located in Kaufman County, Texas outside of Forney and is one of two high schools in the Forney Independent School District. It is classified as a 6A school by the UIL. Varsity competition began during the 2010–11 school year, and North Forney High School had its first graduation in 2012. In 2022–23, the school was rated by the Texas Education Agency as follows: 80 (B) overall, 76 (C) for Student Achievement, 79 (C) for School Progress, and 82 (B) for Closing the Gaps. In 2014, North Forney High School was recognized as having a certified Project Lead the Way high-school engineering program.

== Athletics ==
The North Forney Falcons compete in volleyball, cross-country, basketball, football, powerlifting, soccer, golf, tennis, swimming, track, baseball, and softball.

NFL safety Armani Watts played football at North Forney and graduated from the school in 2014. He played at Texas A&M from 2014–17 and was drafted in the fourth round of the 2018 NFL draft by the Kansas City Chiefs. Watts helped Kansas City to a victory in Super Bowl LIV.

== School uniforms ==
North Forney allows students to wear any solid-color polo shirt and khaki or black shorts or pants, as well as a jacket. The jacket must also be a solid color or school spirit.

The TEA specifies that the parents or guardians of students zoned to a school with uniforms may apply for a waiver to opt out of the uniform policy. Parents must provide legitimate reasons, which are usually religious or philosophical in nature.

== Notable alumni ==
- Armani Watts (2014), NFL defensive back
- Legend Bey (2026), college football running back
