= Earl Little Jr. =

American football player (born 2003)

No. 1 – Ohio State Buckeyes
- Position: Safety
- Class: Redshirt Senior

Personal information
- Born: March 16, 2003 (age 23)
- Listed height: 6 ft 0 in (1.83 m)
- Listed weight: 203 lb (92 kg)

Career information
- High school: American Heritage (Plantation, Florida)
- College: Alabama (2022–2023); Florida State (2024–2025); Ohio State (2026–present)

Awards and highlights
- Second-team All-ACC (2025)
- Stats at ESPN

Earl Little Jr. (born March 16, 2003) is an American college football safety for the Ohio State Buckeyes. He previously played for the Florida State Seminoles and Alabama Crimson Tide.

== Early life ==
Little Jr. attended high school at American Heritage in Plantation, Florida. He was rated as a four-star recruit and committed to play college football for the Alabama Crimson Tide.

== College career ==
=== Alabama ===
In two years at Alabama in 2022 and 2023, Little Jr. recorded two tackles, after suffering multiple shoulder injuries. After the 2023 season, he entered his name into the NCAA transfer portal.

=== Florida State ===
Little Jr. transferred to play for the Florida State Seminoles. In week nine of the 2024 season, he tallied six tackles against Miami. Little Jr. finished the 2024 season with 15 tackles with one being for a loss, and a sack. In week one of the 2025 season, he tallied nine tackles with one being for a loss in a win over his former team #8 Alabama. After entering the transfer portal, Little committed to Ohio State University on January 11, 2026.

== Personal life ==
Little Jr. is the son of former NFL safety Earl Little.
