= Ja'Kobi Jackson =

American football player

No. 24 – Ohio State Buckeyes
- Position: Running back
- Class: Redshirt Senior

Personal information
- Listed height: 5 ft 11 in (1.80 m)
- Listed weight: 217 lb (98 kg)

Career information
- High school: Pensacola Catholic (Pensacola, Florida)
- College: Coahoma (2020–2022); Florida (2023–2025); Ohio State (2026–present)
- Stats at ESPN

Ja'Kobi Jackson is an American college football running back for the Ohio State Buckeyes. He previously played for the Coahoma Tigers and Florida Gators.

== Early life ==
Jackson attended Pensacola Catholic High School in Pensacola, Florida. During his senior season, he earned first-team all-state honors. Jackson was an unranked recruit and committed to play college football at Coahoma Community College.

== College career ==
=== Coahoma CC ===
In three years at Coahoma Community College from 2020 through 2022, Jackson played in 20 games, rushing for 1,390 yards and 14 touchdowns on 276 carries, while also hauling in 14 passes for 115 yards and two touchdowns. After the conclusion of the season, Jackson entered the NCAA transfer portal.

=== Florida ===
Jackson transferred to play for the Florida Gators. In 2023, he took a redshirt. In week 11 of the 2024 season, Jackson ran for 116 yards and a touchdown on 19 carries in a game against Texas. He finished the 2024 season with 509 rushing yards and seven touchdowns. Jackson finished the 2025 season with 27 carries for 98 yards. After the season he once again entered the NCAA transfer portal.

=== Ohio State ===
Jackson transferred to play for the Ohio State Buckeyes.
