= Connor Hawkins =

American football player

No. 96 – Ohio State Buckeyes
- Position: Placekicker
- Class: Redshirt Sophomore

Personal information
- Listed height: 6 ft 1 in (1.85 m)
- Listed weight: 200 lb (91 kg)

Career information
- High school: Liberty Hill (Liberty Hill, Texas)
- College: Baylor (2024–2025); Ohio State (2026–present)
- Stats at ESPN

Connor Hawkins is an American football kicker for the Ohio State Buckeyes. He previously played for the Baylor Bears.

== Early life ==
Hawkins attended Liberty Hill High School in Williamson County, Texas, and committed to play college football for the Baylor Bears.

== College career ==
=== Baylor ===
As a freshman in 2024, Hawkins was the Bears backup kicker and attempted one field goal, which he missed. In week 6 of the 2025 season, he hit the game-winning 53-yard field goal versus Kansas State. Hawkins finished the 2025 season, converting on all 37 of his extra points, while going 18 for 22 on field goal attempts. After the conclusion of the season, he entered the NCAA transfer portal.

=== Ohio State ===
Hawkins transferred to play for the Ohio State Buckeyes. He entered the 2026 season as the Buckeyes starting kicker.
