= Legend Bey =

American football player (born 2007)

No. 2 – Ohio State Buckeyes
- Position: Running back
- Class: Freshman

Personal information
- Born: December 24, 2007 (age 18)
- Listed height: 5 ft 10 in (1.78 m)
- Listed weight: 195 lb (88 kg)

Career information
- High school: North Forney
- College: Ohio State (2026–present)
- Stats at ESPN

Legend Bey (born December 24, 2007) is an American football running back for the Ohio State Buckeyes.

== Early life ==
Bey attended North Forney High School in Kaufman County, Texas. He was rated as a four-star recruit by 247Sports and committed to play college football for the Tennessee Volunteers over Ohio State. However, in November 2025, Bey flipped his commitment to play for the Ohio State Buckeyes. Then, in December, he once again flipped his commitment and signed to play for Tennessee. Shortly after signing with Tennessee, he requested to be released from the Volunteers. Ultimately, Bey was released from Tennessee and signed to play for Ohio State.

== College career ==
Heading into the 2026 season, Bey was set to be a key contributor for the Buckeyes. Before the start of fall camp, he was suspended for two practices due to a violation of team rules.
