= Qua Russaw =

American football player (born c.2005)

No. 4 – Ohio State Buckeyes
- Position: Linebacker
- Class: (redshirt) Junior

Personal information
- Born: c. 2005 (age 20–21); Montgomery, Alabama, U.S.
- Listed height: 6 ft 2 in (1.88 m)
- Listed weight: 240 lb (109 kg)

Career information
- High school: George Washington Carver (AL)
- College: Alabama (2023–2025); Ohio State (2026–present)
- Stats at ESPN

Jaquavious "Qua" Russaw (born c. 2005) is an American college football linebacker for the Ohio State Buckeyes. He previously played for the Alabama Crimson Tide.

== Early life ==
Russaw was born in Montgomery, Alabama, and attended George Washington Carver High School. He was a two-time first-team all-state selection in football and also competed in track at Carver. He ran 11.7 in the 100 and also competed in the shot put.

Russaw was rated No. 9 in the ESPN 300 ranking of prospects in the 2023 college football recruiting class, though ranked somewhat lower by On3.com (No. 27 nationally), Rivals.com (No. 43 nationally), and 247Sports (No. 64 nationally). He received scholarship offers from multiple universities, including Alabama, Georgia, Clemson, Florida State, LSU, Miami, Texas A&M, and USC. Russaw committed to Alabama in December 2022.

== College career ==
On January 12, 2026, Russaw committed to Ohio State.
