= Chris Henry Jr. =

American football player (born 2007)

No. 15 – Ohio State Buckeyes
- Position: Wide receiver
- Class: Freshman

Personal information
- Born: July 14, 2007 (age 19); Charlotte, North Carolina, U.S.
- Listed height: 6 ft 5 in (1.96 m)
- Listed weight: 195 lb (88 kg)

Career information
- High school: Mater Dei (Santa Ana, California)
- College: Ohio State (2026–present)
- Stats at ESPN

Chris Henry Jr. (born July 14, 2007) is an American college football wide receiver for the Ohio State Buckeyes. He was rated as the number one receiver recruit in the class of 2026 by ESPN.

== Early life ==
Henry is the son of late Cincinnati Bengals wide receiver Chris Henry Sr. Henry spent his freshman season at West Clermont High School in Batavia, Ohio, where he totaled 29 catches for 292 yards and five touchdowns, and two carries for 48 yards. As a defensive back, he had 16 tackles, three interceptions, and two fumble recoveries, one going for a touchdown. Ahead of his sophomore season, Henry transferred to Withrow High School in Cincinnati, Ohio. That season, he set a school record with 1,127 receiving yards on 71 catches with 10 touchdowns. Ahead of his junior season, Henry transferred to play at Mater Dei High School. His junior season was cut short due to a knee injury.

=== Recruiting ===
Before his freshman season, Henry already held offers from Ohio State, Grambling State, Connecticut, West Virginia, Marshall, and Akron. He was later rated as a five-star recruit and committed to play college football for the Ohio State Buckeyes over Clemson, Georgia, and USC.

== College career ==
In week one of the 2026 season, Henry Jr. hauled in one pass for 15 yards and a touchdown in a win over Ball State.

== Personal life ==
Henry is the son of former NFL wide receiver Chris Henry, who died in 2009. Afterwards, Henry became very close with his father's former teammate Adam "Pacman" Jones, seeing him as a father figure. Henry's sister Seini plays basketball at Ohio State. Henry's younger brother, Demarcus Henry is a five-star basketball prospect and one of the top recruits in the class of 2027.
