= 2022 Oregon Ducks football team =

American college football season

2022 Oregon Ducks football

Holiday Bowl champion

Holiday Bowl, W 28–27 vs. North Carolina
- Conference: Pac-12 Conference

Ranking
- Coaches: No. 16
- AP: No. 15
- Record: 10–3 (7–2 Pac-12)
- Head coach: Dan Lanning (1st season)
- Offensive coordinator: Kenny Dillingham (1st season)
- Co-offensive coordinator: Junior Adams (1st season)
- Offensive scheme: Spread option
- Defensive coordinator: Tosh Lupoi (1st season)
- Co-defensive coordinator: Matt Powledge (1st season)
- Base defense: 3–4
- Captain: Game captains
- Home stadium: Autzen Stadium

2022 Pac-12 Conference football standings
	Conf.			Overall
Team	W		L	W		L
No. 12 USC y	8	–	1	11	–	3
No. 10 Utah y$	7	–	2	10	–	4
No. 8 Washington	7	–	2	11	–	2
No. 15 Oregon	7	–	2	10	–	3
No. 17 Oregon State	6	–	3	10	–	3
No. 21 UCLA	6	–	3	9	–	4
Washington State	4	–	5	7	–	6
Arizona	3	–	6	5	–	7
California	2	–	7	4	–	8
Arizona State†	2	–	7	3	–	9
Stanford	1	–	8	3	–	9
Colorado	1	–	8	1	–	11
Championship: Utah 47, USC 24
$ – Conference champion; y – Championship game participant; Rankings from AP Poll

The 2022 Oregon Ducks football team represented the University of Oregon during the 2022 NCAA Division I FBS football season. The team was led by first-year head coach Dan Lanning. The Ducks played their home games at Autzen Stadium in Eugene, Oregon, and competed as members of the Pac-12 Conference. The Ducks' bid for a berth in the Pac-12 Championship Game would have been clinched if they won on November 26 against Oregon State. However, Oregon lost the game, meaning they fell into a three-way tie with Washington and Utah. Utah won the tiebreaker to advance to the Pac-12 championship. Oregon defeated North Carolina in the Holiday Bowl to finish 10–3 and ranked #15 by the Associated Press.

== Off-season ==
=== Departures ===
==== Coaching changes ====
Following the 2021 regular season, then-head coach Mario Cristobal departed Oregon for the University of Miami. The rest of Oregon's staff remained through the Alamo Bowl before departing as well; none of the 2021 coaching staff remained for the 2022 season.

==== 2022 NFL draft ====
Due to COVID-19, the NCAA granted an extra year of eligibility to all college athletes, and all could have returned for another year at Oregon. Several Ducks declared for the 2022 NFL draft, but Kayvon Thibodeaux was the lone Ducks player selected. After the conclusion of the draft, a number of other Ducks players reached free-agent deals with NFL teams.

Round	Pick	Player	Position	Team
1	5	Kayvon Thibodeaux	DE	New York Giants

==== Undrafted NFL free agents ====
Player	Position	Team
Anthony Brown	QB	Baltimore Ravens
Johnny Johnson III	WR	Houston Texans
Verone McKinley III	S	Miami Dolphins
George Moore IV	OL	Green Bay Packers
C. J. Verdell	RB	Indianapolis Colts
Devon Williams	WR	Baltimore Ravens

Departing transfers
Name	No.	Pos.	Height	Weight	Year	Hometown	New school
Kingsley Suamataia	#76	OL	6'6	317	Freshman	Orem, UT	BYU
Mycah Pittman	#4	WR	5'11	200	Sophomore	Tampa, FL	Florida State
D. J. James	#12	CB	6'0	185	Sophomore	Mobile, AL	Auburn
Jayson Jones	#93	DT	6'6	320	Freshman	Calera, AL	Auburn
Robby Ashford	#4	QB	6'4	225	Freshman	Hoover, AL	Auburn
Cooper Shults	#45	TE	6'6	244	Freshman	Sacramento, CA	Nevada
Kai Arneson	#64	OL	6'7	303	Freshman	Monument, CO	Nevada
Spencer Curtis	#25	WR	5'11	187	RS freshman	Murray, UT	Nevada
Cross Patton	#22	RB	5'6	155	RS freshman	Atlanta, GA	Nevada
Trey Benson	#1	RB	6'1	215	Freshman	Greenville, MS	Florida State
Travis Dye	#26	RB	5'10	190	Junior	Norco, CA	USC
Logan Sagapolu	#61	OL	6'2	344	Freshman	Lehi, UT	Miami
Kristian Williams	#91	DT	6'2	285	RS Freshman	Memphis, TN	Missouri

=== Additions ===
Incoming transfers
Name	No.	Pos.	Height	Weight	Year	Hometown	Prev. school
Bucky Irving	#0	RB	5'10	194	Sophomore	Chicago, IL	Minnesota
Bo Nix	#10	QB	6'2	210	Sophomore	Pinson, AL	Auburn
Christian Gonzalez	#3	DB	6'1	200	Freshman	The Colony, TX	Colorado
Sam Taimani	#94	DL	6'2	320	Sophomore	Salt Lake City, UT	Washington
Chase Cota	#23	WR	6'4	200	Senior	Medford, OR	UCLA
Casey Rogers	#98	DT	6'5	285	Junior	Syracuse, NY	Nebraska

==== Recruiting class ====
College recruiting (2022)
Name	Hometown	School	Height	Weight	Commit date
Josh Conerly Jr. OT	Seattle, WA	Rainier Beach High School	6 ft 4 in (1.93 m)	305 lb (138 kg)	Apr 8, 2022
Josh Conerly Jr. OT	Recruit ratings: Rivals: 247Sports: ESPN: (87)				
Devon Jackson; LB	Omaha, NE	Harry A. Burke High School	6 ft 2 in (1.88 m)	200 lb (91 kg)	Oct 2, 2021
Devon Jackson; LB	Recruit ratings: Rivals: 247Sports: ESPN: (84)				
Jalil Tucker; ATH	Lincoln, CA	Lincoln High School	6 ft 0 in (1.83 m)	180 lb (82 kg)	Aug 21, 2021
Jalil Tucker; ATH	Recruit ratings: Rivals: 247Sports: ESPN: (83)				
Jahlil Florence; CB	San Diego, CA	Lincoln High School	6 ft 1 in (1.85 m)	185 lb (84 kg)	Feb 2, 2022
Jahlil Florence; CB	Recruit ratings: Rivals: 247Sports: ESPN: (83)				
Dave Iuli; OG	Puyallup, WA	Puyallup High School	6 ft 5 in (1.96 m)	330 lb (150 kg)	Feb 2, 2022
Dave Iuli; OG	Recruit ratings: Rivals: 247Sports: ESPN: (83)				
Jordan James; RB	Murfreesboro, TN	Oakland High School	5 ft 10 in (1.78 m)	200 lb (91 kg)	Mar 29, 2021
Jordan James; RB	Recruit ratings: Rivals: 247Sports: ESPN: (82)				
Trejon Williams; DB	Portland, OR	Jefferson High School	6 ft 0 in (1.83 m)	180 lb (82 kg)	Mar 25, 2021
Trejon Williams; DB	Recruit ratings: Rivals: 247Sports: ESPN: (81)				
Harrison Taggart; LB	Draper, UT	Corner Canyon High School	6 ft 2 in (1.88 m)	200 lb (91 kg)	Oct 17, 2021
Harrison Taggart; LB	Recruit ratings: Rivals: 247Sports: ESPN: (81)				
Justius Lowe; ATH	Lake Oswego, OR	Lake Oswego High School	6 ft 1 in (1.85 m)	185 lb (84 kg)	Jan 18, 2022
Justius Lowe; ATH	Recruit ratings: Rivals: 247Sports: ESPN: (80)				
Khamari Terrell; CB	Killeen, TX	Shoemaker High School	6 ft 0 in (1.83 m)	180 lb (82 kg)	Jan 28, 2022
Khamari Terrell; CB	Recruit ratings: Rivals: 247Sports: ESPN: (79)				
Ben Roberts; DT	Salt Lake City, UT	East High School	6 ft 3 in (1.91 m)	290 lb (130 kg)	Sep 5, 2021
Ben Roberts; DT	Recruit ratings: Rivals: 247Sports: ESPN: (79)				
Michael Wooten; OT	Simi Valley, CA	Sierra Canyon School	6 ft 6 in (1.98 m)	310 lb (140 kg)	Jul 1, 2021
Michael Wooten; OT	Recruit ratings: Rivals: 247Sports: ESPN: (78)				
Anthony Jones; ATH	Henderson, NV	Liberty High School	6 ft 5 in (1.96 m)	240 lb (110 kg)	Dec 15, 2021
Anthony Jones; ATH	Recruit ratings: Rivals: 247Sports: ESPN: (76)				
Sir Mells; DT	Henderson, NV	Liberty High School	6 ft 4 in (1.93 m)	310 lb (140 kg)	Jun 25, 2021
Sir Mells; DT	Recruit ratings: Rivals: 247Sports: ESPN: (76)				
Kawika Rogers; OT	Kapaa, HI	Kapaa High School	6 ft 5 in (1.96 m)	325 lb (147 kg)	Jan 17, 2022
Kawika Rogers; OT	Recruit ratings: Rivals: 247Sports: ESPN: (75)				
Overall recruit ranking:
‡ Refers to 40-yard dash; Note: In many cases, Scout, Rivals, 247Sports, On3, and ESPN may conflict in their listings of height, weight and 40 time.; In these cases, the average was taken. ESPN grades are on a 100-point scale.; Sources: "2022 Team Ranking". Rivals.com.

*= 247Sports Composite rating; ratings are out of 1.00. (five stars= 1.00–.98, four stars= .97–.90, three stars= .80–.89, two stars= .79–.70, no stars= <70)
†= Despite being rated as a four and five star recruit by ESPN, On3.com, Rivals.com and 247Sports.com, TBD received a four-five star 247Sports Composite rating.
Δ= Left the Oregon program following signing but prior to the 2022 season.

== Preseason ==
=== Pac-12 Media Day ===
The Pac-12 Media Day was held in July, 2022 in Hollywood, California. Whereas in previous years the media would vote on division standings and conference championship game result, beginning in 2022 the divisions were used purely for scheduling purposes. The conference championship game will have the two teams with the best conference records, regardless of division, and the media vote reflects that change.

Media poll
Predicted finish	Team	Votes (1st place)
1	Utah	384 (26)
2	Oregon	345 (2)
3	USC	341 (5)
4	UCLA	289
5	Oregon State	246
6	Washington	212
7	Washington State	177
8	Stanford	159
9	California	154
10	Arizona State	123
11	Arizona	86
12	Colorado	58

=== Preseason All-Pac-12 teams ===
First Team
Position	Player	Class	Team
Offense
OL	Alex Forsyth	SR	Oregon
OL	T. J. Bass	SR	Oregon
Defense
DL	Brandon Dorlus	JR	Oregon
LB	Noah Sewell	SO	Oregon

Second Team
Position	Player	Class	Team
Offense
RB	Byron Cardwell	SO	Oregon
Defense
LB	Justin Flowe	Rs FR	Oregon
DB	Christian Gonzalez	SO	Oregon
Special teams
PK	Camden Lewis	JR	Oregon

== Schedule ==
Date	Time	Opponent	Rank	Site	TV	Result	Attendance
September 3	12:30 p.m.	at No. 3 Georgia*	No. 11	Mercedes-Benz Stadium; Atlanta, GA (Chick-fil-A Kickoff Game)	ABC	L 3–49	76,490
September 10	5:30 p.m.	No. 12 (FCS) Eastern Washington*		Autzen Stadium; Eugene, OR	P12N	W 70–14	47,289
September 17	12:30 p.m.	No. 12 BYU*	No. 25	Autzen Stadium; Eugene, OR	FOX	W 41–20	54,463
September 24	1:00 p.m.	at Washington State	No. 15	Martin Stadium; Pullman, WA	FOX	W 44–41	33,058
October 1	8:00 p.m.	Stanford	No. 13	Autzen Stadium; Eugene, OR (rivalry)	FS1	W 45–27	52,218
October 8	6:00 p.m.	at Arizona	No. 12	Arizona Stadium; Tucson, AZ	P12N	W 49–22	50,800
October 22	12:30 p.m.	No. 9 UCLA^{†}	No. 10	Autzen Stadium; Eugene, OR (College GameDay)	FOX	W 45–30	59,962
October 29	12:30 p.m.	at California	No. 8	California Memorial Stadium; Berkeley, CA	FS1	W 42–24	37,077
November 5	12:30 p.m.	at Colorado	No. 8	Folsom Field; Boulder, CO	ESPN	W 49–10	42,089
November 12	4:10 p.m.	No. 25 Washington	No. 6	Autzen Stadium; Eugene, OR (rivalry)	FOX	L 34–37	58,756
November 19	7:30 p.m.	No. 10 Utah	No. 12	Autzen Stadium; Eugene, OR	ESPN	W 20–17	57,009
November 26	12:30 p.m.	at No. 21 Oregon State	No. 9	Reser Stadium; Corvallis, OR (rivalry)	ABC	L 34–38	28,840
December 28	5:00 p.m.	vs. North Carolina*	No. 15	Petco Park; San Diego, CA (Holiday Bowl)	FOX	W 28–27	36,242
*Non-conference game; ^{†}Homecoming; Rankings from AP Poll (and CFP Rankings, after November 1) – Released prior to game; All times are in Pacific time

== Rankings ==
Ranking movements Legend: ██ Increase in ranking ██ Decrease in ranking RV = Received votes
	Week															
Poll	Pre	1	2	3	4	5	6	7	8	9	10	11	12	13	14	Final
AP	11	RV	25	15	13	12	12	10	8	8	6	12	10	15	15	15
Coaches	12	24	24	18	15	12	11	9	8	8	6	13	9	15	14	16
CFP	Not released									8	6	12	9	16	15	Not released

== Personnel ==
=== Roster ===
2022 Oregon Ducks roster
Quarterbacks: 9 – Jay Butterfield – (redshirt) freshman (6'6, 216); 10 – Bo Nix – junior (6'2, 213); 12 – Jake Van Dyne – sophomore (6'2, 187); 13 – Ty Thompson – (redshirt) freshman (6'4, 224); 16 – Marcus Sanders – freshman (6'5, 228); Running backs: 0 – Bucky Irving – sophomore – (5'10, 194); 5 – Sean Dollars – sophomore – (5'8, 199); 20 – Jordan James – freshman (5'10, 210); 21 – Byron Cardwell – sophomore – (6'0, 206); 22 – Noah Whittington – sophomore (5'8, 194); 25 – Brison Cobbins – sophomore (5'8, 193); 26 – Ellis Bynum – freshman (5'8, 187); 28 – Preston Alford – freshman (5'10, 194); 29 – Kilohana Haasenritter – (redshirt) freshman (6'0, 189); 31 – La'Vaughn Luellen – (redshirt) freshman (5'10, 230); 34 – Aaron Smith – (redshirt) freshman (5'11, 225); Wide receivers: 1 – Kris Hutson – sophomore (5'11, 172); 2 – Dont'e Thornton – sophomore (6'5, 199); 6 – Isaah Crocker – junior (6'1, 183); 7 – Seven McGee – sophomore (5'9, 181); 11 – Troy Franklin – sophomore (6'3, 178); 14 – Justius Lowe – freshman (6'1, 182); 15 – Isaiah Brevard – (redshirt) freshman (6'3, 196); 17 – Kyler Kasper – freshman (6'6, 193); 19 – Caleb Chapman – senior (6'5, 218); 23 – Chase Cota – senior (6'4, 200); 38 – Kade Wisher – junior (5'10, 165); 81 – Cole Brosterhous – sophomore (6'3, 190); 82 – Michael Jennings – sophomore (6'0, 177); 83 – Josh Delgado – (redshirt) sophomore (5'9, 182); 85 – Malachi Russell – senior (5'11, 163); 86 – Darrian Anderson – freshman (5'9, 184); 87 – Von Reames - (redshirt) freshman (5'7, 162)	Tight ends: 3 – Terrance Ferguson – sophomore (6'5, 255); 8 – Moliki Matavao – sophomore (6'6, 256); 12 – Terrell Tilmon – sophomore (6'5, 221); 45 – Peter Burke – freshman (6'4, 234); 84 – Cam McCormick – senior (6'5, 260); 88 – Patrick Herbert – sophomore (6'5, 251); 89 – Tyler Nanney – sophomore (6'8, 261); Offensive lineman: 52 – Dave Iuli – freshman (6'3, 339); 53 – Ryan Walk – senior (6'3, 292); 55 – Marcus Harper II – sophomore (6'3, 313); 56 – T. J. Bass – senior (6'4, 325); 60 – Kanen Rossi – (redshirt) freshman (6'1, 286); 62 – Holden Whipple – (redshirt) freshman (6'4, 300); 65 – Charlie Pickard – (redshirt) freshman (6'4, 284); 67 – Cole Young – sophomore (6'5, 321); 69 – Bailey Jaramillo – (redshirt) freshman (6'6, 315); 70 – Dawson Jaramillo – junior (6'5, 300); 71 – Malaesala Aumavae-Laulu – senior (6'6, 330); 72 – Bram Walden – (redshirt) freshman (6'3, 304); 73 – Kawika Rogers – freshman (6'5, 334); 74 – Steven Jones – junior (6'5, 340); 75 – Faaope Laloulu – sophomore (6'7, 330); 76 – Josh Conerly Jr. – freshman (6'4, 294); 77 – Michael Wooten – freshman (6'4, 305); 78 – Alex Forsyth – senior (6'4, 312)	Defensive lineman: 3 – Brandon Dorlus – junior (6'3, 290); 40 – Sir Mells – freshman (6'3, 315); 44 – Bradyn Swinson – sophomore (6'4, 233); 48 – Treven Ma'ae – sophomore (6'5, 272); 50 – Popo Aumavae – senior (6'3, 304); 52 – Ben Roberts – freshman (6'2, 311); 55 – Sam Taimani – junior (6'3, 315); 58 – Jackson Powers-Johnson – sophomore (6'3, 319); 61 – Josh Simmons – sophomore (6'6, 280); 73 – Ty Delgado – freshman (6'2, 284); 90 – Jake Shipley – sophomore (6'3, 267); 91 – Jordon Riley – sennior (6'5, 325); 94 – Sua'ava Poti – sophomore (6'3, 283); 95 – Keyon Ware-Hudson – sophomore (6'2, 281); 97 – Maceal Afaese – (redshirt) freshman (6'4, 259); 98 – Casey Rogers – junior (6'5, 285); 99 – Keanu Williams – (redshirt) freshman (6'4, 300); Linebackers: 1 – Noah Sewell – sophomore (6'2, 253); 2 – D. J. Johnson – senior (6'4, 270); 5 – Anthony Jones – freshman (6'3, 243); 9 – Jaden Navarrette – (redshirt) freshman (6'3, 230); 10 – Justin Flowe – (redshirt) freshman (6'3, 220); 17 – Jabril McNeill – sophomore (6'4, 230); 18 – Mase Funa – junior (6'3, 255); 21 – Keith Brown – sophomore (6'1, 235); 26 – Devon Jackson – freshman (6'2, 214); 32 – Emar'rion Winston – freshman (6'4, 245); 33 – Jeffrey Bassa – sophomore (6'2, 212); 34 – Harrison Taggart – freshman (6'1, 216); 35 – Micah Roth – senior (6'2, 223); 42 – Jackson LaDuke – (redshirt) freshman (6'2, 236); 43 – Brandon Buckner – sophomore (6'1, 250); 47 – Elijah Williams – freshman (6'1, 218); 56 – TJ Gilbert – (redshirt) freshman (6'2, 245); 71 – Malachi Hannah – freshman (6'1, 232)	Defensive backs: 0 – Christian Gonzalez – sophomore (6'2, 201); 4 – Bennett Williams – senior (6'0, 205); 6 – Jahlil Florence – freshman (6'1, 191); 7 – Steve Stephens IV – junior (6'0, 197); 8 – Dontae Manning – sophomore (5'10, 189); 11 – Trikweze Bridges – sophomore (6'3, 192); 12 – Daymon David – sophomore (6'0, 182); 13 – Bryan Addison – junior (6'5, 195); 14 – Khamari Terrell – freshman (6'1, 174); 19 – Jamal Hill – junior (6'0, 211); 20 – Jalil Tucker – freshman (6'0, 165); 22 – Darren Barkins – (redshirt) freshman (5'9, 170); 23 – Trejon Williams – freshman (5'11, 187); 24 – JJ Greenfield – (redshirt) freshman (6'1, 178); 25 – Jonathan Flowe – (redshirt) freshman (6'1, 209); 27 – Marko Vidackovic – (redshirt) freshman (6'1, 192); 28 – Avante Dickerson – sophomore (6'0, 173); 29 – Dominic Stephens – freshman (6'1, 181); 30 – Donovan Dalton – senior (6'3, 208); 31 – DJ Beckum – (redshirt) freshman (5'9, 166); 36 – Timon Davis – (redshirt) freshman (5'9, 159); 37 – Max Wysocki – sophomore (5'11, 213); 38 – Rayquan Williams – freshman (6'1, 168); 39 – Dane Sipos – (redshirt) freshman (6'0, 182); 41 – Zach Grisham – freshman (5'11, 192); 43 – Devin Morrow – (redshirt) freshman (5'10, 159); 46 – Bryce Boettcher sophomore (6'2, 200); Kickers: 49 – Camden Lewis – junior (5'10, 206); 80 – Alex Balees – sophomore (6'0, 172); 98 – Andrew Boyle – sophomore (6'2, 199); Punters: 92 – Ross James – sophomore (6'2, 180); 93 – Adam Barry – senior (6'6, 230); 96 – Lachlan Bruce – sophomore (6'2, 220); Long snappers: 45 – Karsten Battles – senior (6'1, 250); 57 – Luke Basso – (redshirt) freshman (6'3, 227)
2022 Oregon Football Roster (10/25/2026)

Source and player details:

=== Coaching staff ===
Name	Position	Consecutive season at Oregon
Dan Lanning	Head coach	1st
Kenny Dillingham	Offensive coordinator	1st
Tosh Lupoi	Defensive coordinator/linebackers coach	1st
Junior Adams	Co-Offensive coordinator/wide receivers coach	1st
Matt Powledge	Co-Defensive coordinator	1st
Joe Lorig	Special teams coordinator/Nickels coach	1st
Adrian Klemm	Associate head coach/Run game coordinator/offensive line coach	1st
Tony Tuioti	Defensive line coach	1st
Demetrice Martin	Cornerbacks coach/Passing game coordinator	1st
Drew Mehringer	Tight ends coach	1st
Carlos Locklyn	Running backs coach	1st

=== Support staff ===
- Zach Tinker, special teams quality control

== Game summaries ==
=== vs No. 3 Georgia ===
No. 3 Georgia Bulldogs (0–0) vs No. 11 Oregon Ducks (0–0) – Game summary

Quarter	1	2	3	4	Total
No. 11 Oregon	0	3	0	0	3
No. 3 Georgia	7	21	14	7	49

at Mercedes-Benz Stadium • Atlanta, Georgia

- Date: September 3, 2022
- Game time: 3:30 p.m. EST
- Game weather: Indoor, 88 °F (31 °C)
- Game attendance: 76,490
- Referee: Mike Roche
- TV announcers (ABC): Sean McDonough (play-by-play), Todd Blackledge (analyst), Molly McGrath (sideline)

Game information

First quarter

- (6:15) UGA – Ladd McConkey 9-yard run, Jack Podlesny kick (Drive: 12 plays, 85 yards, 5:18; Georgia 7–0)

Second quarter

- (14:55) UGA – Stetson Bennett 1-yard run, Jack Podlesny kick (Drive: 7 plays, 92 yards, 3:37; Georgia 14–0)
- (8:25) UGA – Kenny McIntosh 1-yard Run, Jack Podlesny kick (Drive: 6 plays, 56 yards, 3:46; Georgia 21–0)
- (3:57) ORE – Camden Lewis 35-yard field goal (Drive: 12 plays, 58 yards, 4:28; Georgia 21–3)
- (0:21) UGA – Ladd McConkey 4-yard Pass, Jack Podlesny kick (Drive: 8 plays, 75 yards, 3:36; Georgia 28–3)

Third quarter

- (12:17) UGA – Kendall Milton 12-yard run, Jack Podlesny kick (Drive: 6 plays, 64 yards, 2:34; Georgia 35–3)
- (5:20) UGA – Adonai Mitchell 18-yard pass from Stetson Bennett, Jack Podlesny kick (Drive: 9 plays, 75 yards, 3:57; Georgia 42–3)

Fourth quarter

- (14:50) UGA – Kendall Milton 18-yard pass Carson Beck, Jack Podlesny kick (Drive: 9 plays, 89 yards, 4:36; Georgia 49–3)

Statistics	ORE	UGA
First downs	21	26
Total yards	313	571
Rushes/yards	31–140	25–132
Passing yards	173	439
Passing: Comp–Att–Int	21–37–2	30–37–0
Time of possession	28:50	31:10

Team	Category	Player	Statistics
Oregon	Passing	Bo Nix	21/37, 173 yards, 2 INT
Oregon	Rushing	Bo Nix	8 carries, 37 yards
Oregon	Receiving	Terrance Ferguson	4 receptions, 37 yards
Georgia	Passing	Stetson Bennett	25/31, 368 yards, 2 TD
Georgia	Rushing	Kendall Milton	8 carries, 50 yards, TD
Georgia	Receiving	Kenny McIntosh	9 receptions, 117 yards

=== vs Eastern Washington ===
Eastern Washington Eagles (1–0) vs Oregon Ducks (0–1) – Game summary

Quarter	1	2	3	4	Total
Eagles	0	7	7	0	14
Ducks	14	28	21	7	70

at Autzen Stadium • Eugene, OR

- Date: September 10, 2022
- Game time: 5:30 p.m.
- Game weather: Sunny, 75 °F (24 °C)
- Game attendance: 47,289
- Referee: Chris Coyte
- TV announcers (Pac-12 Network): Ted Robinson (play-by-play), Yogi Roth (analyst)

Game information

First quarter

- (9:27) ORE – Terrance Ferguson 13-yard pass from Bo Nix, Camden Lewis kick (Drive: 9 plays, 45 yards, 4:09; Oregon 7–0)
- (4:52) ORE – Noah Whittington 5-yard run, Camden Lewis kick (Drive: 9 plays, 72 yards, 3:34; Oregon 14–0)

Second quarter

- (14:08) ORE – Terrance Ferguson 19-yard pass from Bo Nix, Camden Lewis kick (Drive: 10 plays, 83 yards, 4:31; Oregon 21–0)
- (10:10) ORE – Bucky Irving 1-yard run, Camden Lewis kick (Drive: 9 plays, 44 yards, 3:40; Oregon 28–0)
- (6:03) EWU – Jett Carpenter 7-yard pass from Gunner Talkington, Jackson Cleaver kick (Drive: 9 plays, 38 yards, 3:56; Oregon 28–7)
- (3:14) ORE – Byron Cardwell 13-yard pass from Bo Nix, Camden Lewis kick (Drive: 7 plays, 72 yards, 2:43; Oregon 35–7)
- (0:00) ORE – Troy Franklin 7-yard pass from Bo Nix, Camden Lewis kick (Drive: 9 plays, 65 yards, 2:20; Oregon 42–7)

Third quarter

- (11:31) ORE– Cam McCormick 2-yard pass from Bo Nix, Camden Lewis kick (Drive: 8 plays, 75 yards, 3:29; Oregon 49–7)
- (11:18) ORE – Casey Rogers 0-yard fumble return, Camden Lewis kick (Drive: 1 plays, 0 yards, 0:00; Oregon 56–7)
- (5:38) ORE – Byron Cardwell 10-yard run, Camden Lewis kick (Drive: 9 plays, 78 yards, 3:10; Oregon 63–7)
- (2:18) EWU – Freddie Roberson 15-yard pass from Gunner Talkington, Jackson Cleaver kick (Drive: 10 plays, 73 yards, 3:11; Oregon 63–14)

Fourth quarter

- (12:07) ORE – Kilohana Haasenritter 6-yard run, Camden Lewis kick (Drive: 11 plays, 76 yards, 5:03; Oregon 70–14)

Statistics	EWU	ORE
First downs	11	40
Total yards	187	604
Rushes/yards	28–100	48–263
Passing yards	87	341
Passing: Comp–Att–Int	12–23–2	34–41–0
Time of possession	21:05	38:55

Team	Category	Player	Statistics
Eastern Washington	Passing	Gunner Talkington	12/21, 87 yards, 2 TD, 2 INT
Eastern Washington	Rushing	Micah Smith	7 carries, 27 yards
Eastern Washington	Receiving	Freddie Roberson	3 receptions, 33 yards, TD
Oregon	Passing	Bo Nix	28/33, 277 yards, 5 TD
Oregon	Rushing	Bucky Irving	8 carries, 74 yards, TD
Oregon	Receiving	Troy Franklin	10 receptions, 84 yards, TD

=== vs No. 12 BYU ===
No. 12 BYU Cougars (2–0) vs No. 25 Oregon Ducks (1–1) – Game summary

Quarter	1	2	3	4	Total
No. 12 Cougars	0	7	0	13	20
No. 25 Ducks	10	14	14	3	41

at Autzen Stadium • Eugene, OR

- Date: September 17, 2022
- Game time: 12:30 p.m.
- Game weather: Cloudy, 69 °F (21 °C)
- Game attendance: 54,463
- Referee: Mark Duddy
- TV announcers (ABC): Jason Benetti (play-by-play), Brock Huard (analyst), Allison Williams (sideline)

Game information

First quarter

- (12:38) ORE – Bo Nix 5-yard run, Camden Lewis kick (Drive: 4 plays, 62 yards, 2:02; Oregon 7–0)
- (4:03) ORE – Camden Lewis 28-yard field goal (Drive: 7 plays, 39 yards, 4:18; Oregon 10–0)

Second quarter

- (0:57) BYU – Isaac Rex 28-yard pass from Jaren Hall, Jake Oldroyd kick (Drive: 10 plays, 75 yards, 4:33; Oregon 10–7)
- (0:46) ORE – Bo Nix 2-yard run, Camden Lewis kick (Drive: 8 plays, 75 yards, 3:09; Oregon 17–7)
- (9:02) ORE – Terrance Ferguson 15-yard pass from Bo Nix, Camden Lewis kick (Drive: 13 plays, 79 yards, 5:33; Oregon 24–7)

Third quarter

- (6:13) ORE – Bo Nix 6-yard run, Camden Lewis kick (Drive: 9 plays, 75 yards, 3:06; Oregon 31–7)
- (2:33) ORE – Terrance Ferguson 9-yard pass from Bo Nix, Camden Lewis kick (Drive: 4 plays, 35 yards, 1:35; Oregon 38–7)

Fourth quarter

- (13:49) BYU – Kody Epps 18-yard pass from Jaren Hall, Jake Oldroyd kick (Drive: 7 plays, 55 yards, 2:44; Oregon 38–14)
- (0:55) BYU – Christopher Brooks 2-yard run (Drive: 4 plays, 25 yards, 1:52; Oregon 38–20)
- (10:21) ORE – Camden Lewis 25-yard field goal (Drive: 12 plays, 68 yards, 8:23; Oregon 41–20)

Statistics	BYU	ORE
First downs	21	23
Total yards	366	439
Rushes/yards	24–61	44–212
Passing yards	305	227
Passing: Comp–Att–Int	29–41–0	14–20–1
Time of possession	26:49	33:11

Team	Category	Player	Statistics
BYU	Passing	Jaren Hall	29/41, 305 yards, 2 TD
BYU	Rushing	Christopher Brooks	10 carries, 28 yards, TD
BYU	Receiving	Chase Roberts	4 receptions, 60 yards
Oregon	Passing	Bo Nix	13/18, 222 yards, 2 TD
Oregon	Rushing	Bucky Irving	14 carries, 97 yards
Oregon	Receiving	Troy Franklin	3 receptions, 84 yards

=== at Washington State ===
No. 15 Oregon Ducks (2–1) at Washington State Cougars (3–0) – Game summary

Quarter	1	2	3	4	Total
No. 15 Ducks	3	6	6	29	44
Cougars	10	7	10	14	41

at Martin Stadium • Pullman, WA

- Date: September 24, 2022
- Game time: 1:00 p.m.
- Game weather: Partly cloudy, 73 °F (23 °C)
- Game attendance: 33,058
- Referee: Mike McCabe
- TV announcers (FOX): Tim Brando (play-by-play), Spencer Tillman (analyst)

Game information

First quarter

- (11:41) WSU – Cameron Ward 5-yard run, Dean Janikowski kick (Drive: 8 plays, 75 yards, 3:04; Washington State 7–0)
- (7:36) ORE – Camden Lewis 24-yard field goal (Drive: 8 plays, 69 yards, 3:49; Washington State 7–3)
- (4:31) WSU – Dean Janikowski 38-yard field goal (Drive: 8 plays, 54 yards, 2:42; Washington State 10–3)

Second quarter

- (14:56) ORE – Camden Lewis 28-yard field goal (Drive: 11 plays, 65 yards, 4:24; Washington State 10–6)
- (4:36) WSU – Francis Mauigoa 95-yard interception return, Dean Janikowski kick (Drive: 12 plays, 81 yards, 4:57; Washington State 17–6)
- (1:33) ORE – Camden Lewis 29-yard field goal (Drive: 8 plays, 64 yards, 2:50; Washington State 17–9)

Third quarter

- (14:11) ORE – Bucky Irving 12-yard pass from Bo Nix (Drive: 3 plays, 75 yards, 0:36; Washington State 17–15)
- (8:50) WSU – Dean Janikowski 38-yard field goal (Drive: 12 plays, 54 yards, 5:04; Washington State 20–15)
- (4:16) WSU – De'Zhaun Stribling 15-yard pass from Cameron Ward, Dean Janikowski kick (Drive: 6 plays, 62 yards, 2:43; Washington State 27–15)

Fourth quarter

- (14:56) ORE – Jordan James 1-yard pass from Bo Nix, Camden Lewis kick (Drive: 10 plays, 84 yards, 4:02; Washington State 27–22)
- (6:42) WSU – Robert Ferrel 1-yard pass from Cameron Ward, Dean Janikowski kick (Drive: 12 plays, 81 yards, 5:19; Washington State 34–22)
- (3:48) ORE – Cam McCormick 1-yard pass from Bo Nix, Camden Lewis kick (Drive: 11 plays, 75 yards, 2:46; Washington State 34–29)
- (1:21) ORE – Troy Franklin 50-yard pass from Bo Nix, Bo Nix two-point run (Drive: 5 plays, 69 yards, 1:00; Oregon 37–34)
- (1:01) ORE – Mase Funa 27-yard interception return, Camden Lewis kick (Drive: 2 plays, 6 yards, 0:03; Oregon 44–34)
- (0:01) WSU – Nakia Watson 1-yard run, Dean Janikowski kick (Drive: 7 plays, 75 yards, 0:49; Oregon 44–41)

Statistics	ORE	WSU
First downs	28	27
Total yards	624	428
Rushes/yards	32–178	25–53
Passing yards	446	375
Passing: Comp–Att–Int	34–45–1	37–48–2
Time of possession	28:58	31:02

Team	Category	Player	Statistics
Oregon	Passing	Bo Nix	33/44, 428 yards, 3 TD, INT
Oregon	Rushing	Bucky Irving	11 carries, 81 yards
Oregon	Receiving	Troy Franklin	5 receptions, 137 yards, TD
Washington State	Passing	Cam Ward	37/48, 375 yards, 2 TD, 2 INT
Washington State	Rushing	Nakia Watson	12 carries, 36 yards, TD
Washington State	Receiving	De'Zhaun Stribling	5 receptions, 84 yards, TD

=== vs Stanford ===
Stanford Cardinal (1–2) vs No. 13 Oregon Ducks (3–1) – Game summary

Quarter	1	2	3	4	Total
Cardinal	0	3	14	10	27
No. 13 Ducks	10	21	7	7	45

at Autzen Stadium • Eugene, OR

- Date: October 1, 2022
- Game time: 8:00 p.m.
- Game weather: Sunny, 52 °F (11 °C)
- Game attendance: 52,218
- Referee: Francisco Villar
- TV announcers (ABC): Alex Faust (play-by-play), Petros Papadakis (analyst)

Game information

First quarter

- (10:00) ORE – Camden Lewis 38-yard field goal (Drive: 11 plays, 46 yards, 3:51; Oregon 3–0)
- (0:00) ORE – Chase Cota 49-yard pass from Bo Nix, Camden Lewis kick (Drive: 2 plays, 59 yards, 0:16; Oregon 10–0)

Second quarter

- (7:37) STAN – Joshua Karty 23-yard field goal (Drive: 12 plays, 76 yards, 4:42; Oregon 10–3)
- (2:22) ORE – Troy Franklin 10-yard pass from Bo Nix, Camden Lewis kick (Drive: 8 plays, 75 yards, 3:15; Oregon 17–3)
- (3:59) ORE – Bo Nix 4-yard run, Camden Lewis kick (Drive: 1 plays, 4 yards, 0:08; Oregon 24–3)
- (0:01) ORE – Jordan James 1-yard run, Camden Lewis kick (Drive: 10 plays, 68 yards, 2:34; Oregon 31–3)

Third quarter

- (5:01) STAN – Casey Filkins 42-yard pass from Tanner McKee, Joshua Karty kick (Drive: 7 plays, 75 yards, 2:46; Oregon 31–10)
- (4:46) ORE – Bo Nix 80-yard run, Camden Lewis kick (Drive: 1 play, 80 yards, 0:14; Oregon 38–10)
- (2:12) STAN – Elijah Higgins 28-yard pass from Tanner McKee, Joshua Karty (Drive: 6 plays, 64 yards, 2:26; Oregon 38–17)

Fourth quarter

- (14:31) ORE – Sean Dollars 2-yard run, Camden Lewis kick (Drive: 7 plays, 75 yards, 2:41; Oregon 45–17)
- (4:22) STAN – Joshua Karty 53-yard field goal (Drive: 8 plays, 50 yards, 3:17; Oregon 45–20)
- (1:03) STAN – Mudia Reuben 18-yard pass from Ari Patu, Joshua Karty kick (Drive: 5 plays, 50 yards, 1:53; Oregon 45–27)

Statistics	STAN	ORE
First downs	22	23
Total yards	332	515
Rushes/yards	34–127	37–351
Passing yards	205	164
Passing: Comp–Att–Int	22–38–0	17–34–1
Time of possession	32:36	27:24

Team	Category	Player	Statistics
Stanford	Passing	Tanner McKee	19/33, 166 yards, 2 TD
Stanford	Rushing	Casey Filkins	19 carries, 80 yards
Stanford	Receiving	Casey Filkins	3 receptions, 59 yards, TD
Oregon	Passing	Bo Nix	16/29, 161 yards, 2 TD
Oregon	Rushing	Bo Nix	6 carries, 141 yards, 2 TD
Oregon	Receiving	Chase Cota	2 receptions, 56 yards, TD

=== at Arizona ===
No. 12 Oregon Ducks (4–1) at Arizona Wildcats (3–2) – Game summary

Quarter	1	2	3	4	Total
No. 12 Ducks	7	21	21	0	49
Wildcats	3	10	3	6	22

at Arizona Stadium • Tucson, AZ

- Date: October 8, 2022
- Game time: 6:00 p.m.
- Game weather: Cloudy, 69 °F (21 °C), Wind: SE
- Game attendance: 50,800
- Referee: Chris Coyte
- TV announcers (Pac-12 Network): Ted Robinson (play-by-play), Yogi Roth (analyst)

Game information

First quarter

- (5:13) ARIZ – Tyler Loop 38-yard field goal (Drive: 9 plays, 44 yards, 3:40; Arizona 3–0)
- (2:53) ORE – Noah Whittington 55-yard run, Camden Lewis kick (Drive: 5 plays, 75 yards, 2:20; Oregon 7–3)

Second quarter

- (12:01) ORE – Bo Nix 2-yard run, Camden Lewis kick (Drive: 7 plays, 90 yards, 2:59; Oregon 14–3)
- (4:42) ORE – Moliki Matavao 3-yard run, Camden Lewis kick (Drive: 9 plays, 86 yards, 4:13; Oregon 21–3)
- (3:43) ARIZ – D. J. Williams 52-yard run, Tyler Loop kick (Drive: 2 plays, 75 yards, 0:59; Oregon 21–10)
- (0:34) ORE – Jordan James 1-yard run, Camden Lewis kick (Drive: 8 plays, 75 yards, 3:09; Oregon 28–10)
- (0:00) ARIZ – Tyler Loop 36-yard field goal (Drive: 5 plays, 56 yards, 0:34; Oregon 28–13)

Third quarter

- (11:13) ORE – Bo Nix 2-yard run, Camden Lewis kick (Drive: 8 plays, 75 yards, 3:47; Oregon 35–13)
- (9:44) ORE – Bucky Irving 23-yard run, Camden Lewis kick (Drive: 4 plays, 39 yards, 1:09; Oregon 42–13)
- (5:04) ORE – Bo Nix 25-yard run, Camden Lewis kick (Drive: 5 plays, 57 yards, 2:15; Oregon 49–13)
- (0:28) ARIZ – Tyler Loop 30-yard field goal (Drive: 5 plays, 18 yards, 1:00; Oregon 49–16)

Fourth quarter

- (9:51) ARIZ – Tetairoa McMillan 11-yard pass from Jayden de Laura (Drive: 10 plays, 85 yards, 4:20; Oregon 49–22)

Statistics	ORE	ARIZ
First downs	29	23
Total yards	580	356
Rushes/yards	41–306	25–115
Passing yards	274	241
Passing: Comp–Att–Int	23–29–0	24–42–1
Time of possession	33:19	26:41

Team	Category	Player	Statistics
Oregon	Passing	Bo Nix	20/25, 265 yards
Oregon	Rushing	Noah Whittington	6 carries, 92 yards, TD
Oregon	Receiving	Chase Cota	3 receptions, 60 yards
Arizona	Passing	Jayden de Laura	24/42, 241 yards, TD, INT
Arizona	Rushing	Jonah Coleman	9 carries, 74 yards
Arizona	Receiving	Jacob Cowing	6 receptions, 77 yards

=== vs UCLA ===
No. 9 UCLA Bruins (6–0) vs No. 10 Oregon Ducks (5–1) – Game summary

Quarter	1	2	3	4	Total
No. 9 Bruins	3	10	3	14	30
No. 10 Ducks	3	28	7	7	45

at Autzen Stadium • Eugene, OR

- Date: October 22, 2022
- Game time: 12:30 p.m.
- Game weather: Rainy, 59 °F (15 °C)
- Game attendance: 59,962
- Referee: Michael Mothershed
- TV announcers (FOX): Jason Benetti (play-by-play), Brock Huard (analyst), Allison Williams (sideline)

Game information

First quarter

- (10:36) ORE – Camden Lewis 44-yard field goal (Drive: 10 plays, 53 yards, 4:24; Oregon 3–0)
- (4:09) UCLA – Nicholas Barr-Mira 47-yard field goal (Drive: 14 plays, 46 yards, 6:27; Tied 3–3)

Second quarter

- (14:56) ORE – Terrance Ferguson 17-yard pass from Bo Nix, Camden Lewis kick (Drive: 10 plays, 71 yards, 4:13; Oregon 10–3)
- (12:38) UCLA – Keegan Jones 36-yard pass from Dorian Thompson-Robinson, Nicholas Barr-Mira kick (Drive: 7 plays, 75 yards, 2:18; Tied 10–10)
- (10:49) ORE – Troy Franklin 49-yard pass from Bo Nix, Camden Lewis kick (Drive: 5 plays, 75 yards, 1:49; Oregon 17–10)
- (6:34) ORE – Jordan James 2-yard run, Camden Lewis kick (Drive: 8 plays, 54 yards, 3:19; Oregon 24–10)
- (3:10) UCLA – Nicholas Barr-Mira 44-yard field goal (Drive: 8 plays, 49 yards, 4:20; Oregon 24–13)
- (0:06) ORE – Troy Franklin 2-yard pass from Bo Nix, Camden Lewis kick (Drive: 10 plays, 88 yards, 3:04; Oregon 31–13)

Third quarter

- (9:27) UCLA – Nicholas Barr-Mira 33-yard field goal (Drive: 13 plays, 53 yards, 5:33; Oregon 31–16)
- (1:52) ORE – Cam McCormick 17-yard pass from Bo Nix, Camden Lewis kick (Drive: 15 plays, 82 yards, 7:35; Oregon 38–16)

Fourth quarter

- (13:56) UCLA – Zach Charbonnet 1-yard run, Nicholas Barr-Mira kick (Drive: 10 plays, 69 yards, 2:56; Oregon 38–23)
- (11:37) ORE – Bucky Irving 37-yard pass from Bo Nix, Camden Lewis kick (Drive: 6 plays, 75 yards, 2:19; Oregon 45–23)
- (4:11) UCLA – Jake Bobo 22-yard pass from Dorian Thompson-Robinson, Nicholas Barr-Mira kick (Drive: 8 plays, 75 yards, 1:58; Oregon 45–30)

Statistics	UCLA	ORE
First downs	26	31
Total yards	448	545
Rushes/yards	30–186	46–262
Passing yards	262	283
Passing: Comp–Att–Int	27–39–1	22–28–0
Time of possession	26:33	33:27

Team	Category	Player	Statistics
UCLA	Passing	Dorian Thompson-Robinson	27/39, 262 yards, 2 TD, INT
UCLA	Rushing	Zach Charbonnet	20 carries, 151 yards, TD
UCLA	Receiving	Jake Bobo	8 receptions, 101 yards, TD
Oregon	Passing	Bo Nix	22/28, 283 yards, 5 TD
Oregon	Rushing	Bucky Irving	19 carries, 107 yards
Oregon	Receiving	Troy Franklin	8 receptions, 132 yards, 2 TD

=== at California ===
No. 8 Oregon Ducks (6–1) at California Golden Bears (3–4) – Game summary

Quarter	1	2	3	4	Total
No. 8 Ducks	0	21	7	14	42
Golden Bears	3	7	0	14	24

at California Memorial Stadium • Berkeley, CA

- Date: October 29, 2022
- Game time: 12:30 p.m.
- Game weather: Sunny, 67 °F (19 °C)
- Game attendance: 37,077
- Referee: Mark Duddy
- TV announcers (FS1): Tim Brando (play-by-play), Spencer Tillman (analyst)

Game information

First quarter

- (4:01) CAL – Dario Longhetto 28-yard field goal (Drive: 9 plays, 77 yards, 4:09; California 3–0)

Second quarter

- (14:56) ORE – Bo Nix 4-yard run, Camden Lewis kick (Drive: 6 plays, 47 yards, 2:08; Oregon 7–3)
- (13:08) CAL – J. Michael Sturdivant 6-yard pass Jack Plummer, Dario Longhetto kick (Drive: 5 plays, 75 yards, 1:48; California 10–7)
- (4:14) ORE – Bo Nix 1-yard run, Camden Lewis kick (Drive: 8 plays, 63 yards, 3:21; Oregon 14–10)
- (1:54) ORE – Bucky Irving 12-yard pass from Bo Nix, Camden Lewis kick (Drive: 3 plays, 48 yards, 0:35; Oregon 21–10)

Third quarter

- (12:45) ORE – Noah Whittington 29-yard pass from Bo Nix, Camden Lewis kick (Drive: 5 plays, 75 yards, 2:15; Oregon 28–10)

Fourth quarter

- (12:19) ORE – Bo Nix 1-yard run, Camden Lewis kick (Drive: 7 plays, 56 yards, 2:58; Oregon 35–10)
- (7:38) CAL – Monroe Young 11-yard pass from Kai Millner, Dario Longhetto kick (Drive: 13 plays, 75 yards, 4:41; Oregon 35–17)
- (3:16) ORE – Patrick Herbert 40-yard pass from Bo Nix, Camden Lewis kick (Drive: 8 plays, 75 yards, 4:22; Oregon 42–17)
- (2:21) CAL – Justin Richard Baker 55-yard pass from Kai Millner, Dario Longhetto kick (Drive: 3 plays, 75 yards, 0:55; Oregon 42–24)

Statistics	ORE	CAL
First downs	21	29
Total yards	402	586
Rushes/yards	26–74	40–174
Passing yards	328	412
Passing: Comp–Att–Int	28–44–2	27–35–2
Time of possession	28:02	31:58

Team	Category	Player	Statistics
Oregon	Passing	Bo Nix	27/35, 412 yards, 3 TD, 2 INT
Oregon	Rushing	Noah Whittington	10 carries, 66 yards
Oregon	Receiving	Noah Whittington	5 receptions, 67 yards, TD
California	Passing	Jack Plummer	20/33, 214 yards, TD, 2 INT
California	Rushing	Jaydn Ott	14 carries, 57 yards
California	Receiving	Jeremiah Hunter	5 receptions, 96 yards

=== at Colorado ===
No. 8 Oregon Ducks (7–1) at Colorado Buffaloes (1–7) – Game summary

Quarter	1	2	3	4	Total
No. 8 Ducks	14	14	14	7	49
Buffaloes	0	7	3	0	10

at Folsom Field • Boulder, CO

- Date: November 5, 2022
- Game time: 12:30 p.m. MST
- Game weather: Partly cloudy, 55 °F (13 °C)
- Game attendance: 42,089
- Referee: Matt Richards
- TV announcers (ESPN): Mike Monaco (play-by-play), Rod Gilmore (analyst), Tiffany Blackmon (sideline)

Game information

First quarter

- (12:14) ORE – Josh Conerly Jr. 4-yard pass from Bo Nix, Camden Lewis kick (Drive: 6 plays, 75 yards, 2:46; Oregon 7–0)
- (2:25) ORE – Bo Nix 18-yard pass from Bucky Irving, Camden Lewis kick (Drive: 13 plays, 85 yards, 4:55; Oregon 14–0)

Second quarter

- (12:43) ORE – Noah Sewell 1-yard run, Camden Lewis kick (Drive: 8 plays, 70 yards, 3:30; Oregon 21–0)
- (12:14) COL – Jordyn Tyson 81-yard pass from J. T. Shrout, Cole Becker kick (Drive: 3 plays, 81 yards, 0:29; Oregon 21–7)
- (0:53) ORE – Moliki Matavao 16-yard pass from Bo Nix, Camden Lewis kick (Drive: 7 plays, 78 yards, 3:09; Oregon 28–7)

Third quarter

- (11:51) COL – Cole Becker 44-yard field goal (Drive: 7 plays, 49 yards, 3:09; Oregon 28–10)
- (8:17) ORE – Bo Nix 1-yard run, Camden Lewis kick (Drive: 2 plays, 2 yards, 0:31; Oregon 35–10)
- (3:25) ORE – Noah Whittington 9-yard run, Camden Lewis kick (Drive: 6 plays, 25 yards, 2:24; Oregon 42–10)

Fourth quarter

- (12:53) ORE – Bo Nix 1-yard run, Camden Lewis kick (Drive: 7 plays, 51 yards, 2:32; Oregon 49–10)

Statistics	ORE	COL
First downs	21	20
Total yards	479	367
Rushes/yards	39–195	36–120
Passing yards	284	247
Passing: Comp–Att–Int	22–27–0	17–34–2
Time of possession	28:36	31:24

Team	Category	Player	Statistics
Oregon	Passing	Bo Nix	20/24, 274 yards, 2 TD
Oregon	Rushing	Bucky Irving	11 carries, 120 yards
Oregon	Receiving	Kris Hutson	4 receptions, 80 yards
Colorado	Passing	J. T. Shrout	17/34, 247 yards, TD, 2 INT
Colorado	Rushing	Anthony Hankerson	11 carries, 54 yards
Colorado	Receiving	Jordyn Tyson	5 receptions, 137 yards, TD

=== vs No. 25 Washington ===
No. 25 Washington Huskies (7–2) vs No. 6 Oregon Ducks (8–1) – Game summary

Quarter	1	2	3	4	Total
No. 25 Huskies	7	6	14	10	37
No. 6 Ducks	3	7	21	3	34

at Autzen Stadium • Eugene, OR

- Date: November 12, 2022
- Game time: 4:00 p.m.
- Game weather: Sunny, 50 °F (10 °C)
- Game attendance: 58,756
- Referee: Francisco Villar
- TV announcers (FOX): Jason Benetti (play-by-play), Brock Huard (analyst), Allison Williams (sideline)

Game information

First quarter

- (9:36) WASH – Wayne Taulapapa 13-yard run, Peyton Henry kick (Drive: 12 plays, 75 yards, 5:24; Washington 7–0)
- (5:14) ORE – Camden Lewis 43-yard field goal (Drive: 10 plays, 40 yards, 4:22; Washington 7–3)

Second quarter

- (14:57) WASH – Peyton Henry 30-yard field goal (Drive: 10 plays, 63 yards, 5:17; Washington 10–3)
- (4:03) ORE – Bo Nix 10-yard run, Camden Lewis kick (Drive: 8 plays, 47 yards, 4:00; Tied 10–10)
- (1:46) WASH – Peyton Henry 27-yard field goal (Drive: 5 plays, 40 yards, 2:16; Washington 13–10)

Third quarter

- (13:16) ORE – Dont'e Thornton 46-yard pass from Bo Nix, Camden Lewis kick (Drive: 4 plays, 65 yards, 1:44; Oregon 17–13)
- (9:21) WASH – Cameron Davis 3-yard run, Peyton Henry kick (Drive: 10 plays, 65 yards, 3:55; Washington 20–17)
- (6:24) ORE – Noah Whittington 29-yard run, Camden Lewis kick (Drive: 6 plays, 76 yards, 2:52; Oregon 24–20)
- (5:30) WASH – Ja'Lynn Polk 76-yard pass from Michael Penix Jr., Peyton Henry kick (Drive: 2 plays, 75 yards, 0:54; Washington 27–24)
- (3:40) ORE – Troy Franklin 67-yard pass from Bo Nix, Camden Lewis kick (Drive: 4 plays, 89 yards, 1:45; Oregon 31–27)

Fourth quarter

- (3:54) ORE – Camden Lewis 26-yard field goal (Drive: 20 plays, 91 yards, 10:33; Oregon 34–27)
- (3:07) WASH – Taj Davis 62-yard pass from Michael Penix Jr., Peyton Henry kick (Drive: 3 plays, 65 yards, 0:47; Tied 34–34)
- (0:51) WASH – Peyton Henry 43-yard field goal (Drive: 4 plays, 8 yards, 0:35; Washington 37–34)

Statistics	WASH	ORE
First downs	23	32
Total yards	522	592
Rushes/yards	22–114	51–312
Passing yards	408	280
Passing: Comp–Att–Int	26–35–1	19–28–0
Time of possession	25:29	34:31

Team	Category	Player	Statistics
Washington	Passing	Michael Penix Jr.	26/35, 408 yards, 2 TD, INT
Washington	Rushing	Wayne Taulapapa	10 carries, 70 yards, TD
Washington	Receiving	Jalen McMillan	8 receptions, 122 yards
Oregon	Passing	Bo Nix	19/27, 280 yards, 2 TD
Oregon	Rushing	Bucky Irving	19 carries, 143 yards
Oregon	Receiving	Troy Franklin	5 receptions, 139 yards, TD

=== vs No. 10 Utah ===
No. 10 Utah Utes (8–2) vs No. 12 Oregon Ducks (8–2) – Game summary

Quarter	1	2	3	4	Total
No. 10 Utes	3	0	14	0	17
No. 12 Ducks	7	10	0	3	20

at Autzen Stadium • Eugene, OR

- Date: November 19, 2022
- Game time: 7:30 p.m.
- Game weather: Partly cloudy, 30 °F (−1 °C)
- Game attendance: 57,009
- Referee: Chris Coyte
- TV announcers (ESPN): Dave Flemming (play-by-play), Rod Gilmore (analyst), Tiffany Blackmon (sideline)

Game information

First quarter

- (10:56) ORE – Bucky Irving 10-yard run, Camden Lewis kick (Drive: 10 plays, 79 yards, 4:04; Oregon 7–0)
- (1:09) UTAH – Jadon Redding 45-yard field goal (Drive: 7 plays, 21 yards, 3:27; Oregon 7–3)

Second quarter

- (10:28) ORE – Troy Franklin 4-yard pass from Bo Nix, Camden Lewis kick (Drive: 8 plays, 52 yards, 3:34; Oregon 14–3)
- (0:18) ORE – Camden Lewis 30-yard field goal (Drive: 7 plays, 77 yards, 2:11; Oregon 17–3)

Third quarter

- (13:14) UTAH – Karene Reid 11-yard fumble return, Jordan Noyes kick (Drive: 1 play, -3 yards, 0:07; Oregon 17–10)
- (2:39) UTAH – Jaylen Dixon 18-yard run, Jadon Redding kick (Drive: 13 plays, 86 yards, 7:00; Tied 17–17)

Fourth quarter

- (11:17) ORE – Camden Lewis 41-yard field goal (Drive: 15 plays, 52 yards, 6:22; Oregon 20–17)

Statistics	UTAH	ORE
First downs	22	16
Total yards	326	346
Rushes/yards	36–156	25–59
Passing yards	170	287
Passing: Comp–Att–Int	21–38–3	25–37–1
Time of possession	33:25	26:35

Team	Category	Player	Statistics
Utah	Passing	Cameron Rising	21/38, 170 yards, 3 INT
Utah	Rushing	Tavion Thomas	19 carries, 55 yards
Utah	Receiving	Dalton Kincaid	11 receptions, 99 yards
Oregon	Passing	Bo Nix	25/37, 287 yards, TD, INT
Oregon	Rushing	Noah Whittington	10 carries, 53 yards
Oregon	Receiving	Dont'e Thornton	4 receptions, 151 yards

=== at No. 21 Oregon State ===
No. 9 Oregon Ducks (9–2) at No. 21 Oregon State Beavers (8–3) – Game summary

Quarter	1	2	3	4	Total
No. 9 Ducks	7	7	17	3	34
No. 21 Beavers	10	0	7	21	38

at Reser Stadium • Corvallis, OR

- Date: November 26, 2022
- Game time: 12:30 p.m.
- Game weather: Partly cloudy, 46 °F (8 °C)
- Game attendance: 28,840
- Referee: Mark Duddy
- TV announcers (ABC): Dave Flemming (play-by-play), Rod Gilmore (analyst), Tiffany Blackmon (sideline)

Game information

First quarter

- (10:20) OSU – Everett Hayes 50-yard field goal (Drive: 9 plays, 44 yards, 4:40; Oregon State 3–0)
- (7:57) ORE – Chase Cota 44-yard pass from Bo Nix, Camden Lewis kick (Drive: 6 plays, 75 yards, 2:23; Oregon 7–3)
- (2:33) OSU – Ben Gulbranson 1-yard run, Everett Hayes kick (Drive: 13 plays, 75 yards, 5:24; Oregon State 10–7)

Second quarter

- (0:14) ORE – Troy Franklin 9-yard pass from Bo Nix, Camden Lewis kick (Drive: 13 plays, 95 yards, 3:59; Oregon 14–10)

Third quarter

- (13:47) ORE – Jordan James 2-yard run, Camden Lewis kick (Drive: 1 plays, 2 yards, 0:05; Oregon 21–10)
- (9:02) ORE – Noah Whittington 5-yard run, Camden Lewis kick (Drive: 8 plays, 67 yards, 3:21; Oregon 28–10)
- (4:46) ORE – Camden Lewis 42-yard field goal (Drive: 7 plays, 18 yards, 3:38; Oregon 31–10)
- (2:57) OSU – Deshaun Fenwick 4-yard run, Everett Hayes kick (Drive: 4 plays, 75 yards, 1:49; Oregon 31–17)

Fourth quarter

- (14:57) ORE – Camden Lewis 24-yard field goal (Drive: 7 plays, 69 yards, 3:00; Oregon 34–17)
- (13:24) OSU – Isaiah Newell 15-yard run, Everett Hayes kick (Drive: 3 plays, 36 yards, 1:33; Oregon 34–24)
- (12:13) OSU – Ben Gulbranson 1-yard run, Everett Hayes kick (Drive: 2 plays, 2 yards, 0:11; Oregon 34–31)
- (8:11) OSU – Isaiah Newell 6-yard run, Everett Hayes kick (Drive: 4 plays, 28 yards, 1:28; Oregon State 38–34)

Statistics	ORE	OSU
First downs	26	19
Total yards	470	328
Rushes/yards	42–143	43–268
Passing yards	327	60
Passing: Comp–Att–Int	27–41–0	6–13–0
Time of possession	34:47	25:13

Team	Category	Player	Statistics
Oregon	Passing	Bo Nix	27/41, 327 yards, 2 TD
Oregon	Rushing	Noah Whittington	16 carries, 81 yards, TD
Oregon	Receiving	Chase Cota	9 receptions, 136 yards, TD
Oregon State	Passing	Ben Gulbranson	6/13, 60 yards, 2 INT
Oregon State	Rushing	Damien Martinez	15 carries, 103 yards
Oregon State	Receiving	Silas Bolden	2 receptions, 23 yards

=== vs North Carolina (Holiday Bowl) ===
North Carolina Tar Heels (9-4) vs No. 15 Oregon Ducks (9–3) – Game summary
(2022 Holiday Bowl)

Quarter	1	2	3	4	Total
No. 15 Ducks	7	7	0	14	28
Tar Heels	7	14	0	6	27

at Petco Park • San Diego, CA

- Date: December 28, 2022
- Game time: 5:00 p.m.
- Game weather: Sunny, 57 °F (14 °C)
- Game attendance: 36,242
- Referee: Mark Kluczynski
- TV announcers (FOX): Gus Johnson (play-by-play), Joel Klatt (analyst), Jenny Taft (sideline)

Game information

First quarter

- (11:05) ORE – Bucky Irving 2-yard run, Camden Lewis kick (Drive: 6 plays, 54 yards, 2:25; Oregon 7–0)
- (4:37) UNC – Andre Green Jr. 6-yard pass from Drake Maye, Noah Burnette kick (Drive: 12 plays, 44 yards, 6:28; Tied 7–7)

Second quarter

- (9:13) ORE – Bucky Irving 66-yard run, Camden Lewis kick (Drive: 4 plays, 80 yards, 1:36; Oregon 14–7)
- (4:34) UNC – Bryson Nesbit 14-yard pass from Drake Maye, Noah Burnette kick (Drive: 10 plays, 75 yards, 4:39; Tied 14–14)
- (0:26) UNC – Kobe Paysour 49-yard pass from Drake Maye, Noah Burnette kick (Drive: 1 play, 49 yards, 0:09; North Carolina 21–14)

Third quarter

None

Fourth quarter

- (9:13) UNC – Noah Burnette 19-yard field goal (Drive: 10 plays, 41 yards, 5:29; North Carolina 24–14)
- (6:58) ORE – Troy Franklin 6-yard pass from Bo Nix, Camden Lewis kick (Drive: 5 plays, 61 yards, 2:15; North Carolina 24–21)
- (2:29) UNC – Noah Burnette 44-yard field goal (Drive: 11 plays, 43 yards, 4:29; North Carolina 27–21)
- (0:19) ORE – Chase Cota 6-yard pass from Bo Nix, Camden Lewis kick (Drive: 8 plays, 79 yards, 2:10; Oregon 28–27)

Statistics	ORE	UNC
First downs	22	21
Total yards	414	322
Rushes/yards	32–209	34–116
Passing yards	205	206
Passing: Comp–Att–Int	23–30–1	18–35–0
Time of possession	27:11	32:49

Team	Category	Player	Statistics
Oregon	Passing	Bo Nix	23/30, 205 yards, 2 TD, INT
Oregon	Rushing	Bucky Irving	13 carries, 149 yards, 2 TD
Oregon	Receiving	Terrance Ferguson	5 receptions, 84 yards
North Carolina	Passing	Drake Maye	18/35, 206 yards, 3 TD
North Carolina	Rushing	Elijah Green	17 carries, 50 yards
North Carolina	Receiving	Kobe Paysour	7 receptions, 98 yards, TD

== Statistics ==
=== Team ===
	Oregon	Opp
Scoring	297	203
Points per game	42.23	29.00
First Downs	196	157
Rushing	104	41
Passing	78	99
Penalty	14	17
Rushing yards	1712	774
Avg per play	6.1	4.1
Avg per game	244.6	110.6
Rushing touchdowns	20	9
Passing yards	1908	1914
Att-Comp-Int	234-165-5	268-181-6
Avg per pass	8.15	7.14
Avg per catch	11.56	10.57
Avg per game	272.57	273.43
Passing touchdowns	17	15
Total offense	3620	2688
Avg per play	7.1	5.9
Avg per game	517.1	384.0
Fumbles lost	3-0	7-3
Penalties – yards	55-466	38-342
Avg per game	66.57	48.86

	Oregon	Opp
Punts – yards	20-799	24-1036
Avg per Punt	39.95	43.17
Time of Possession/Game	31:55	28:04
3rd down conversions	40-86 (46.5%)	48-95 (50.5%)
4th down conversions	12-13 (92.3%)	5-11 (45.5%)
Field goals – attempts	8-8	10-11
PAT – attempts	37-37	23-23

=== Individual leaders ===
==== Offense ====
Passing statistics
#	NAME	POS	RAT	CMP	ATT	YDS	AVG/G	CMP%	TD	INT	LONG
10	Bo Nix	QB	165.91	153	214	1809	258.43	71.5	17	3	55
13	Ty Thompson	QB	70.67	10	18	80	20.00	55.6	0	2	17
0	Bucky Irving	RB	251.20	1	1	18	2.57	100	0	0	18
9	Jay Butterfield	QB	108.40	1	1	1	1	100	0	0	1
	TOTAL		158.71	165	234	1908	272.57	70.51%	17	5	55

Rushing statistics
#	NAME	POS	ATT	NET	AVG	TD	LONG	AVG/G
0	Bucky Irving	RB	79	536	6.8	2	36	76.57
22	Noah Whittington	RB	64	409	6.4	2	55	58.43
10	Bo Nix	QB	48	382	8.0	8	80	54.57
5	Sean Dollars	RB	23	157	6.8	1	20	22.43
20	Jordan James	RB	32	133	4.2	4	24	22.17
21	Byron Cardwell	RB	11	76	6.9	1	16	38.00
29	Kilohana Haasenritter	RB	7	37	5.3	1	9	7.40
2	Dont'e Thornton	WR	1	9	9.0	0	9	1.50
8	Moliki Matavao	TE	1	3	3.0	1	3	0.43
13	Ty Thompson	QB	2	1	0.5	0	2	0.25
7	Seven McGee	WR	3	-11	-3.7	0	6	-1.57
	TEAM		8	-20	-2.5	0	0	-2.86
	TOTAL		279	1712	6.1	20	80	244.57

Receiving statistics
#	NAME	POS	CTH	YDS	AVG	TD	LONG	AVG/G
11	Troy Franklin	WR	35	561	16.0	5	50	80.14
23	Chase Cota	WR	23	313	13.6	1	49	44.71
1	Kris Hutson	WR	17	193	11.3	0	55	27.57
3	Terrance Ferguson	TE	18	168	9.3	5	23	24.00
0	Bucky Irving	RB	13	145	11.2	2	37	20.71
2	Dont'e Thornton	WR	7	122	17.4	0	42	20.33
5	Sean Dollars	RB	12	86	7.2	0	39	12.29
7	Seven McGee	WR	11	67	6.1	0	15	9.57
84	Cam McCormick	TE	8	59	7.4	3	17	8.43
8	Moliki Matavao	TE	4	56	14.0	0	22	8.00
21	Byron Cardwell	RB	4	34	8.5	1	13	17.00
22	Noah Whittington	RB	5	29	5.8	0	9	4.14
88	Patrick Herbert	TE	2	19	9.5	0	14	2.71
10	Bo Nix	QB	1	18	18.0	0	18	2.57
19	Caleb Chapman	WR	1	15	15.0	0	15	5.00
83	Josh Delgado	WR	1	12	12.0	0	12	2.00
20	Jordan James	RB	1	6	6.0	0	6	1.00
17	Kyler Kasper	WR	1	4	4.0	0	4	2.00
29	Kilohana Haasenritter	RB	1	1	1.0	0	1	0.20
	TOTAL		165	1908	11.6	17	55	272.57

==== Defense ====
Defense statistics
#	NAME	POS	SOLO	AST	TOT	TFL-YDS	SACK-YDS	INT	BU	QBH	FR	FF	BLK	SAF	TD
4	Bennett Williams	DB	24	10	34.0	1.0-29	1.0-29	0	3	0	0	2	0	0	0
19	Jamal Hill	DB	22	9	31.0	0-0	0-0	0	2	0	0	0	0	0	0
33	Jeffrey Bassa	ILB	17	13	30.0	2.0-10	1.0-7	0	0	1	0	0	0	0	0
1	Noah Sewell	ILB	12	17	29.0	2.5-25	1.0-12	0	1	2	1	0	0	0	0
10	Justin Flowe	ILB	12	16	28.0	2.0-4	0-0	0	0	1	0	0	0	0	0
7	Steve Stephens IV	DB	12	15	27.0	0-0	0-0	0	0	0	0	0	0	0	0
11	Trikweze Bridges	DB	17	9	26.0	1.0-2	0-0	2	2	0	0	0	0	0	0
0	Christian Gonzalez	DB	19	5	24.0	1.0-3	0-0	1	7	0	0	0	0	0	0
2	D. J. Johnson	OLB	10	12	22.0	5.5-26	4.0-22	0	1	0	1	0	0	0	0
3	Brandon Dorlus	DE	10	10	20.0	6.5-18	2.5-12	0	1	1	0	0	0	0	0
98	Casey Rogers	DL	9	9	18.0	1.5-3	0-0	0	0	1	0	0	0	0	0
13	Bryan Addison	DB	12	4	16.0	1.0-2	0-0	1	1	0	0	1	0	0	0
42	Jackson LaDuke	ILB	6	7	13.0	0-0	0-0	0	0	0	0	0	0	0	0
18	Mase Funa	ILB	3	9	12.0	1.0-2	1.0-2	1	0	0	0	0	0	0	0
91	Jordon Riley	DL	4	8	12.0	1.5-3	0.5-2	0	0	1	0	0	0	0	0
95	Keyon Ware-Hudson	DT	4	5	9.0	1.5-4	0-0	0	0	0	1	0	0	0	0
21	Keith Brown	ILB	4	4	8.0	1.0-9	1.0-9	0	0	0	0	0	0	0	0
24	JJ Greenfield	DB	3	5	8.0	0-0	0-0	0	0	0	0	0	0	0	0
48	Treven Ma'ae	DL	4	4	8.0	2.0-9	1.0-8	0	1	0	0	0	0	0	0
12	Daymon David	DB	5	2	7.0	0-0	0-0	0	0	0	0	0	0	0	0
6	Jahlil Florence	DB	5	2	7.0	1.0-2	0-0	1	0	0	0	1	0	0	0
8	Dontae Manning	DB	5	2	7.0	0-0	0-0	0	0	0	0	0	0	0	0
55	Taki Taimani	DL	3	4	7.0	0.5-1	0-0	0	1	1	0	0	0	0	0
44	Bradyn Swinson	DE	3	3	6.0	1.5-3	0-0	0	0	0	0	0	0	0	0
14	Khamari Terrell	DB	2	2	4.0	0-0	0-0	0	0	0	0	0	0	0	0
22	Darren Barkins	DB	3	0	3.0	0-0	0-0	0	1	0	0	0	0	0	0
90	Jake Shipley	DE	1	2	3.0	0-0	0-0	0	0	0	0	0	0	0	0
46	Bryce Boettcher	DB	0	2	2.0	0-0	0-0	0	0	0	0	0	0	0	0
98	Andrew Boyle	K	2	0	2.0	0-0	0-0	0	0	0	0	0	0	0	0
52	Ben Roberts	DL	0	2	2.0	0-0	0-0	0	0	0	0	0	0	0	0
35	Micah Roth	ILB	2	0	2.0	0-0	0-0	0	0	0	0	0	0	0	0
99	Keanu Williams	DL	0	2	2.0	0-0	0-0	0	0	0	0	0	0	0	0
15	Isaiah Brevard	WR	1	0	1.0	0-0	0-0	0	0	0	0	0	0	0	0
83	Josh Delgado	WR	1	0	1.0	0-0	0-0	0	0	0	0	0	0	0	0
29	Kilohana Haasenritter	RB	1	0	1.0	0-0	0-0	0	0	0	0	0	0	0	0
0	Bucky Irving	RB	1	0	1.0	0-0	0-0	0	0	0	0	0	0	0	0
26	Devon Jackson	ILB	1	0	1.0	0-0	0-0	0	0	0	0	0	0	0	0
20	Jordan James	RB	1	0	1.0	0-0	0-0	0	0	0	0	0	0	0	0
17	Kyler Kasper	RB	0	1	1.0	0-0	0-0	0	0	0	0	0	0	0	0
49	Camden Lewis	K	0	1	1.0	0-0	0-0	0	0	0	0	0	0	0	0
2	Dont'e Thornton	WR	1	0	1.0	0-0	0-0	0	0	0	0	0	0	0	0
20	Jailil Tucker	DB	0	1	1.0	0-0	0-0	0	0	0	0	0	0	0	0
27	Marko Vidackovic	DB	0	1	1.0	0-0	0-0	0	0	0	0	0	0	0	0
22	Noah Whittington	RB	1	0	1.0	0-0	0-0	0	0	0	0	0	0	0	0
40	Sir Mells	DL	0	0	0.0	0-0	0-0	0	1	0	0	0	0	0	0
	TOTAL		243	198	441.0	34.0-155	13.0-103	6	22	8	3	4	0	0	0

Key: POS: Position, SOLO: Solo tackles, AST: Assisted Tackles, TOT: Total tackles, TFL: Tackles-for-loss, SACK: Quarterback Sacks, INT: Interceptions, BU: Passes Broken Up, PD: Passes Defended, QBH: Quarterback Hits, FR: Fumbles Recovered, FF: Forced Fumbles, BLK: Kicks or Punts Blocked, SAF: Safeties, TD : Touchdown

==== Special teams ====
Kicking statistics
#	NAME	POS	XPM	XPA	XP%	FGM	FGA	FG%	1–19	20–29	30–39	40–49	50+	LNG
49	Camden Lewis	K	37	37	100%	8	8	100%	0/0	5/5	2/2	1/1	0/0	44
	TOTALS		37	37	100%	8	8	100%	0/0	5/5	2/2	1/1	0/0	44

Kickoff statistics
#	NAME	POS	KICKS	YDS	AVG	TB	OB
98	Andrew Boyle	K	39	2509	64.3	28	1
49	Camden Lewis	K	10	645	64.5	6	0
91	Alex Bales	K	3	147	49	0	0
	TOTALS		52	3301	63.5	34	1

Punting statistics
#	NAME	POS	PUNTS	YDS	AVG	LONG	TB	I–20	50+	BLK
93	Adam Barry	P	10	397	39.7	58	0	4	1	0
92	James Ross	P	8	335	41.88	52	0	3	1	0
10	Bo Nix	QB	2	67	33.50	34	0	1	0	0
	TOTALS		20	799	39.95	58	0	8	2	0

Kick return statistics
#	NAME	POS	RTNS	YDS	AVG	TD	LNG
7	Seven McGee	WR	6	99	16.5	0	29
1	Kris Hutson	WR	2	26	13.0	0	25
83	Josh Delgado	WR	1	21	21.0	0	21
5	Sean Dollars	RB	1	18	18.0	0	18
0	Bucky Irving	RB	1	17	17.0	0	17
3	Terrance Ferguson	TE	1	0	0.0	0	0
	TOTALS		12	181	15.08	0	29

Punt return statistics
#	NAME	POS	RTNS	YDS	AVG	TD	LONG
1	Kris Hutson	WR	7	23	3.29	0	15
23	Chase Cota	WR	1	15	15.0	0	15
83	Josh Delgado	WR	1	7	7.0	0	7
	TOTALS		9	45	5.0	0	15

=== Scoring ===
Oregon vs Non-Conference Opponents

	1	2	3	4	Total
Oregon	24	45	35	10	114
Opponents	7	35	21	20	83

Oregon vs Pac-12 Opponents

	1	2	3	4	Total
Oregon	23	76	41	43	183
Opponents	16	30	30	44	120

Oregon vs All Opponents

	1	2	3	4	Total
Oregon	47	121	76	53	297
Opponents	23	65	51	66	205

== After the season ==
=== Awards and honors ===
Recipient	Award (Pac-12 Conference)	Week #	Date awarded	Ref.

==== Pac-12 Conference Individual awards ====
Recipient	Award (Pac-12 Conference)	Date awarded	Ref.

==== Individual Yearly awards ====
Recipient	Award	Date awarded	Ref.

==== All-Americans ====
All-Pac-12
Player	Position	1st/2nd team
HM = Honorable mention. Source:

All-Pac-12 Academic
Player	Position	Class	Major	Ref.
HM = Honorable mention. Source:

NCAA Recognized All-American Honors
Player	AP	AFCA	FWAA	TSN	WCFF	Designation
The NCAA recognizes a selection to all five of the AP, AFCA, FWAA, TSN and WCFF first teams for unanimous selections and three of five for consensus selections. HM = Honorable mention. Source:

Other All-American Honors
Player	Athletic	Athlon	BR	CBS Sports	CFN	ESPN	FOX Sports	Phil Steele	SI	USA Today

=== Players drafted into the NFL ===
The NFL draft was held at Union Station in Kansas City, MO on April 27–29, 2023.

Ducks who were picked in the 2023 NFL Draft:

Round	Pick	Player	Position	NFL team
1	17	Christian Gonzalez	CB	New England Patriots
3	80	D. J. Johnson	OLB	Carolina Panthers
5	148	Noah Sewell	LB	Chicago Bears
6	199	Malaesala Aumavae–Laulu	OT	Baltimore Ravens
7	243	Jordon Riley	DT	New York Giants
7	257	Alex Forsyth	C	Denver Broncos

==== NFL Draft combine ====
No members of the 2022 team were invited to participate in drills at the 2023 NFL Scouting Combine.

2023 NFL combine participants
Name	POS	HT	WT	Arms	Hands	40	Bench press	Vert jump	Broad jump	3-cone drill	20-yd shuttle	60-yd shuttle	Ref

† Top performer

DNP = Did not participate
