= List of Oregon Ducks in the NFL draft =

This is a list of Oregon Ducks football players in the NFL draft. At the conclusion of the 2026 NFL draft, Oregon has had 261 players selected all-time in the NFL draft with 27 players selected in the 1st round.

== Key ==
B	Back	K	Kicker	NT	Nose tackle
C	Center	LB	Linebacker	FB	Fullback
DB	Defensive back	P	Punter	HB	Halfback
DE	Defensive end	QB	Quarterback	WR	Wide receiver
DT	Defensive tackle	RB	Running back	G	Guard
E	End	T	Offensive tackle	TE	Tight end

^{*}	Selected to an all-star game (AFL All-Star game, NFL All-Star game or Pro Bowl)
^{†}	Won a league championship (AFL championship, NFL championship, or Super Bowl)
^{‡}	Inducted into Pro Football Hall of Fame
±	Inducted into College Football Hall of Fame

== Selections ==
Year	Round	Pick	Overall	Name	Team	Position	Notes
1936	2	9	18	Tuffy Leemans	New York Giants	FB	2× Pro Bowl, NFL Champion (1938), Pro Football Hall of Fame
1936	5	5	41	Stan Riordan	Chicago Cardinals	E	
1936	8	6	69	Ross Carter	Chicago Cardinals	G	
1937	6	8	58	Del Bjork	Chicago Bears	T	
1939	17	9	159	John Yerby	Green Bay Packers	E	
1940	5	2	32	Frank Emmons	Philadelphia Eagles	B	
1940	6	1	41	Vic Reginato	Chicago Cardinals	E	
1940	14	10	130	Bob Smith	New York Giants	B	
1940	16	4	144	Dennis Donovan	Brooklyn Dodgers	B	
1940	18	8	168	Jay Graybeal	Washington Redskins	B	
1940	19	10	180	Cecil Walden	New York Giants	G	
1941	5	4	34	Chet Haliska	Cleveland Rams	B	
1941	5	10	40	Jim Stuart	Washington Redskins	T	
1941	11	1	91	Marshall Stenstrom	Philadelphia Eagles	B	
1941	19	5	175	Len Isberg	Detroit Lions	B	
1942	3	7	22	Curt Mechan	Brooklyn Dodgers	B	
1942	19	2	172	Bill Regner	Cleveland Rams	E	
1943	3	1	16	Dick Ashcom	Detroit Lions	T	
1943	5	6	36	Val Culwell	New York Giants	G	
1943	11	5	95	Tom Robin	Cleveland Rams	B	
1943	15	4	134	Floyd Rhea	Brooklyn Dodgers	G	
1943	23	5	215	Ed Moshofsky	Cleveland Rams	T	
1943	25	5	235	Jim Shephard	Cleveland Rams	E	
1944	10	6	93	Bob Koch	Green Bay Packers	B	
1944	28	1	286	Bob Davis	Chicago Cardinals	G	
1945	3	1	17	Cecil Gray	Brooklyn Dodgers	C	
1945	5	6	38	Georege Bujan	Washington Redskins	C	
1945	9	7	83	Bill Mayther	Chicago Bears	C	
1945	21	5	213	Leroy Erickson	Cleveland Rams	B	
1945	29	5	301	Bill Davis	Cleveland Rams	B	
1946	10	9	89	Jake Leicht	Washington Redskins	B	
1946	27	2	252	John Kauffman	Boston Yanks	G	
1947	7	9	54	Chris Iversen	New York Giants	B	
1947	20	6	181	Brad Ecklund	Green Bay Packers	C	
1947	22	8	203	Chuck Elliott	Los Angeles Rams	T	
1948	15	1	126	Dan Garza	New York Giants	E	
1948	16	9	144	Don Stanton	Philadelphia Eagles	T	
1948	25	1	226	Dick Wilkins	New York Giants	E	
1949	4	6	37	Norm Van Brocklin	Los Angeles Rams	QB	9× Pro Bowl, 2× NFL Champion (1951, 1960), Pro Football Hall of Fame
1950	3	13	40	Bob Sanders	Philadelphia Eagles	B	
1950	8	10	102	Sam Nevills	Chicago Bears	T	
1950	8	11	103	Woodley Lewis	Los Angeles Rams	B	Pro Bowl (1950), NFL Champion (1951)
1950	15	12	195	Ted Meland	Cleveland Browns	G	
1950	19	13	248	Darrell Robinson	Philadelphia Eagles	E	
1950	25	2	315	Steve Dotur	New York Bulldogs	G	
1951	18	10	217	Dick Daugherty	Los Angeles Rams	G	
1951	21	9	252	Earl Stelle	Los Angeles Rams	B	
1951	27	2	317	Ray Lung	San Francisco 49ers	G	
1952	30	9	358	Dick Patrick	San Francisco 49ers	C	
1953	24	1	278	Monte Brethauer	Baltimore Colts	E	
1953	28	9	334	Tom Novikoff	San Francisco 49ers	B	
1954	18	2	207	Emery Barnes	Green Bay Packers	E	
1955	1	1	1	George Shaw	Baltimore Colts	QB	
1955	4	7	44	Jack Patera	Baltimore Colts	G	
1955	7	5	78	Hal Reeve	Pittsburgh Steelers	T	
1955	18	8	213	Ron Pheister	San Francisco 49ers	C	
1955	30	6	355	Bill Toole	New York Giants	B	
1956	7	11	84	Jack Morris	Los Angeles Rams	B	
1956	8	9	94	Dick James	Washington Redskins	B	
1958	12	3	136	Jack Crabtree	Philadelphia Eagles	B	
1958	21	2	243	Jerry Kershner	Green Bay Packers	T	
1959	8	4	88	Jim Lenden	Detroit Lions	T	
1959	30	4	352	Ron Stover	Detroit Lions	E	
1960	4	1	37	Willie West	St. Louis Cardinals	B	2× AFL All-Star (1963, 1966)
1960	12	7	139	Dave Grosz	Philadelphia Eagles	QB	
1960	15	7	175	John Wilcox	Philadelphia Eagles	T	
1961	8	10	108	Neill Plumley	San Francisco 49ers	T	
1961	11	3	143	Riley Mattson	Washington Redskins	T	
1963	2	6	20	Steve Barnett	Chicago Bears	T	
1963	3	7	35	Ron Snidow	Washington Redskins	T	
1964	2	3	17	Mel Renfro	Dallas Cowboys	DB	10× Pro Bowl, 2× Super Bowl Champion (VI, XII), Pro Football Hall of Fame
1964	3	1	29	Dave Wilcox	San Francisco 49ers	DE	7× Pro Bowl, Pro Football Hall of Fame
1964	11	2	142	Bob Berry	Philadelphia Eagles	QB	Pro Bowl (1969)
1964	19	4	256	H. D. Murphy	Dallas Cowboys	B	
1965	10	4	130	Dave Tobey	Pittsburgh Steelers	C	
1966	15	12	227	Jim Kollman	Chicago Bears	G	
1966	17	3	248	Mike Brundage	Pittsburgh Steelers	QB	
1967	15	15	382	Steve Bunker	Los Angeles Rams	TE	
1967	16	9	402	Bill Smith	Pittsburgh Steelers	C	
1968	1	12	12	Jim Smith	Washington Redskins	DB	
1969	9	22	230	Claxton Welch	Dallas Cowboys	RB	
1970	3	12	64	Andy Maurer	Atlanta Falcons	G	
1970	4	12	90	Jim Evenson	Pittsburgh Steelers	RB	
1970	11	13	273	Alan Pitcaithley	New York Giants	RB	
1971	7	16	172	Bob Newland	New Orleans Saints	WR	
1971	10	15	249	Jack Stambaugh	Cincinnati Bengals	G	
1971	12	18	304	Tom Blanchard	New York Giants	K	
1971	14	20	358	Lionel Coleman	Los Angeles Rams	DB	
1972	1	4	4	Ahmad Rashad	St. Louis Cardinals	WR	4× Pro Bowl (1978–1981)
1972	1	22	22	Tom Drougas	Baltimore Colts	T	
1972	4	24	102	Tom Graham	Denver Broncos	LB	
1972	8	8	190	Leland Glass	Green Bay Packers	WR	
1972	12	23	309	Mike Williams	Kansas City Chiefs	DT	
1972	17	20	436	John McKean	Los Angeles Rams	C	
1973	2	26	52	Chuck Bradley	Miami Dolphins	C	
1973	3	8	60	Tim Stokes	Los Angeles Rams	T	
1973	3	12	64	Dan Fouts	San Diego Chargers	QB	6× Pro Bowl, NFL MVP (1982), Pro Football Hall of Fame
1974	5	18	122	Tim Guy	Buffalo Bills	T	
1974	16	10	400	Jack Connors	San Francisco 49ers	DB	
1975	1	16	16	Russ Francis	New England Patriots	TE	3× Pro Bowl (1977, 1978, 1979), Super Bowl Champion (XIX)
1975	11	2	262	George Martin	New York Giants	DE	Super Bowl Champion (XXI)
1976	1	18	18	Mario Clark	Buffalo Bills	DB	Super Bowl Champion (XIX)
1976	8	23	232	Ron Hunt	Cincinnati Bengals	T	
1976	12	3	322	Ron Lee	San Diego Chargers	DB	
1976	17	17	476	Chuck Wills	Washington Redskins	DB	
1976	17	27	486	Stan Woodfill	Dallas Cowboys	K	
1978	7	9	175	Fred Quillan	San Francisco 49ers	C	2× Pro Bowl (1984, 1985), 2× Super Bowl Champion (XVI, (XIX)
1978	9	3	225	Reggie Grant	New York Jets	DB	
1979	10	18	266	Bruce Beekley	Atlanta Falcons	LB	
1980	4	14	97	Terry Dion	Seattle Seahawks	DE	
1980	8	4	197	Don Coleman	Denver Broncos	WR	
1981	6	18	156	Bryan Hinkle	Pittsburgh Steelers	LB	
1981	12	21	325	Kevin McGill	Cleveland Browns	T	
1982	4	12	95	Reggie Brown	Atlanta Falcons	RB	
1982	6	12	151	Vince Williams	San Francisco 49ers	RB	
1982	11	21	300	Stuart Yatsko	Denver Broncos	G	
1983	2	22	50	Michael Walter	Dallas Cowboys	LB	3× Super Bowl Champion (XIX, XXIII, XXIV)
1983	3	27	83	Steve Brown	Houston Oilers	DB	
1984	3	19	75	Steve Baack	Detroit Lions	DE	
1984	6	23	163	Dan Ralph	Atlanta Falcons	DT	
1984u	1	3	3	Gary Zimmerman	New York Giants	G	7× Pro Bowl, Super Bowl Champion (XXXII), Pro Football Hall of Fame
1986	5	28	138	Lew Barnes	Chicago Bears	WR	
1986	9	19	240	Tony Cherry	San Francisco 49ers	RB	
1986	11	21	298	Drew Smetana	San Diego Chargers	T	
1987	1	13	13	Chris Miller	Atlanta Falcons	QB	Pro Bowl (1991)
1987	3	18	74	Cliff Hicks	Los Angeles Rams	DB	
1988	2	8	35	Anthony Newman	Los Angeles Rams	DB	
1988	4	6	88	Rollin Putzier	Green Bay Packers	DT	
1988	8	23	216	J. J. Birden	Cleveland Browns	WR	
1989	2	22	50	Scott Kozak	Houston Oilers	LB	
1989	3	2	58	Matt Brock	Green Bay Packers	DE	
1989	6	9	148	Thom Kaumeyer	Los Angeles Rams	DB	
1989s	8	0	0	Brett Young	Buffalo Bills	DB	
1990	3	25	78	Latin Berry	Los Angeles Rams	RB	
1990	4	24	105	Chris Oldham	Detroit Lions	DB	
1990	8	24	217	Curt Dykes	Philadelphia Eagles	T	
1990	11	10	286	Daryl Reed	Seattle Seahawks	DB	
1991	4	23	106	Bill Musgrave	Dallas Cowboys	QB	Super Bowl Champion (XXIX)
1992	9	25	249	Muhammad Oliver	Denver Broncos	DB	
1992	12	19	327	Matt LaBounty	San Francisco 49ers	DE	
1993	6	21	161	Eric Castle	San Diego Chargers	DB	
1994	3	10	75	Romeo Bandison	Cleveland Browns	DT	
1994	3	35	100	Ernest Jones	Los Angeles Rams	LB	
1995	6	24	195	Dino Philyaw	New England Patriots	RB	
1995	7	1	209	Chad Cota	Carolina Panthers	DB	
1995	7	12	220	Herman O'Berry	St. Louis Rams	DB	
1996	1	11	11	Alex Molden	New Orleans Saints	DB	
1996	4	8	103	Ricky Whittle	New Orleans Saints	RB	
1996	7	6	215	Jeremy Asher	Washington Redskins	LB	
1997	3	22	82	Paul Wiggins	Pittsburgh Steelers	T	
1997	3	34	94	Kenny Wheaton	Dallas Cowboys	DB	
1997	7	3	204	Tony Graziani	Atlanta Falcons	QB	
1998	2	12	42	Patrick Johnson	Baltimore Ravens	WR	
1998	5	23	146	Blake Spence	New York Jets	TE	
1999	1	3	3	Akili Smith	Cincinnati Bengals	QB	
1999	4	38	133	Josh Bidwell	Green Bay Packers	P	Pro Bowl (2005)
1999	7	2	208	Jed Weaver	Philadelphia Eagles	TE	
2000	3	19	81	Reuben Droughns	Detroit Lions	RB	Super Bowl Champion (XLII)
2000	4	34	128	Peter Sirmon	Tennessee Titans	LB	
2001	5	24	155	A. J. Feeley	Philadelphia Eagles	QB	
2002	1	3	3	Joey Harrington	Detroit Lions	QB	
2002	2	22	54	Maurice Morris	Seattle Seahawks	RB	
2002	3	14	79	Rashad Bauman	Washington Redskins	DB	
2002	4	5	103	Justin Peelle	San Diego Chargers	TE	
2002	6	16	188	Wesly Mallard	New York Giants	DB	
2002	7	36	247	Steve Smith	Jacksonville Jaguars	DB	
2003	4	7	104	George Wrighster	Jacksonville Jaguars	TE	
2003	4	8	105	Onterrio Smith	Minnesota Vikings	RB	
2003	7	7	221	Keenan Howry	Minnesota Vikings	WR	
2004	2	3	35	Igor Olshansky	San Diego Chargers	DT	
2004	2	4	36	Junior Siavii	Kansas City Chiefs	DT	
2004	4	9	105	Samie Parker	Kansas City Chiefs	WR	
2004	6	33	198	Keith Lewis	San Francisco 49ers	DB	
2005	3	30	94	Adam Snyder	San Francisco 49ers	G	
2005	7	9	223	Marcus Maxwell	San Francisco 49ers	WR	
2006	1	12	12	Haloti Ngata	Baltimore Ravens	DT	5× Pro Bowl (2009–2013), Super Bowl Champion (XLVII)
2006	2	17	49	Kellen Clemens	New York Jets	QB	
2006	4	14	111	Demetrius Williams	Baltimore Ravens	WR	
2006	7	27	235	Justin Phinisee	Tampa Bay Buccaneers	DB	
2007	5	18	155	Dante Rosario	Carolina Panthers	TE	
2007	6	13	187	Matt Toeaina	Cincinnati Bengals	DT	
2007	6	36	210	Jordan Kent	Seattle Seahawks	WR	
2008	1	13	13	Jonathan Stewart	Carolina Panthers	RB	Pro Bowl (2015)
2008	5	21	156	Dennis Dixon	Pittsburgh Steelers	QB	2x Super Bowl Champion (XLIII, XLVII)
2008	7	34	241	Geoff Schwartz	Carolina Panthers	T	
2009	2	2	34	Patrick Chung	New England Patriots	DB	3× Super Bowl Champion (XLIX, LI, LIII)
2009	2	10	42	Jairus Byrd	Buffalo Bills	DB	3× Pro Bowl (2009, 2012, 2013)
2009	2	17	49	Max Unger	Seattle Seahawks	C	3× Pro Bowl (2012, 2013, 2018), Super Bowl Champion (XLVIII)
2009	5	23	159	Fenuki Tupou	Philadelphia Eagles	T	
2009	6	32	205	Ra'Shon Harris	Pittsburgh Steelers	DT	
2009	7	38	247	Nick Reed	Seattle Seahawks	DE	
2010	2	6	38	T. J. Ward	Cleveland Browns	DB	2× Pro Bowl (2013, 2014), Super Bowl Champion (50)
2010	3	6	70	Ed Dickson	Baltimore Ravens	TE	Super Bowl Champion (XLVII)
2010	4	13	111	Walter Thurmond	Seattle Seahawks	DB	Super Bowl Champion (XLVIII)
2011	4	19	116	Casey Matthews	Philadelphia Eagles	LB	
2012	2	29	61	LaMichael James	San Francisco 49ers	RB	
2012	5	20	155	Josh Kaddu	Miami Dolphins	LB	
2012	6	8	178	Mark Asper	Buffalo Bills	G	
2012	7	33	240	David Paulson	Pittsburgh Steelers	TE	
2013	1	3	3	Dion Jordan	Miami Dolphins	DE	
2013	1	20	20	Kyle Long	Chicago Bears	G	3× Pro Bowl (2013–2015)
2013	2	14	46	Kiko Alonso	Buffalo Bills	LB	PFWA Rookie of the Year (2013)
2013	6	14	182	Kenjon Barner	Carolina Panthers	RB	3× Super Bowl Champion (LII, LIII, LV)
2013	6	24	192	John Boyett	Indianapolis Colts	DB	
2014	3	22	86	Josh Huff	Philadelphia Eagles	WR	
2014	4	24	124	De'Anthony Thomas	Kansas City Chiefs	WR	
2014	5	1	141	Taylor Hart	Philadelphia Eagles	DE	
2014	7	39	254	Terrance Mitchell	Dallas Cowboys	DB	
2015	1	2	2	Marcus Mariota	Tennessee Titans	QB	
2015	1	17	17	Arik Armstead	San Francisco 49ers	DE	
2015	2	21	53	Jake Fisher	Cincinnati Bengals	T	
2015	3	7	71	Hroniss Grasu	Chicago Bears	C	
2015	7	24	241	Ifo Ekpre-Olomu	Cleveland Browns	DB	
2016	1	7	7	DeForest Buckner	San Francisco 49ers	DE	3× Pro Bowl (2018, 2021, 2023)
2016	7	30	251	Joe Walker	Philadelphia Eagles	LB	Super Bowl Champion (LII)
2018	3	7	71	Royce Freeman	Denver Broncos	RB	
2018	5	16	173	Tyrell Crosby	Detroit Lions	G	
2019	4	30	132	Ugo Amadi	Seattle Seahawks	DB	Super Bowl Champion (LVII)
2019	5	18	156	Justin Hollins	Denver Broncos	LB	Super Bowl Champion (LVI)
2019	7	25	239	Dillon Mitchell	Minnesota Vikings	WR	
2019	7	27	241	Jalen Jelks	Dallas Cowboys	DE	
2020	1	6	6	Justin Herbert	Los Angeles Chargers	QB	NFL Offensive Rookie of the Year (2020), Pro Bowl (2021)
2020	4	26	132	Troy Dye	Minnesota Vikings	LB	
2020	5	4	150	Shane Lemieux	New York Giants	G	
2020	6	29	208	Jake Hanson	Green Bay Packers	C	
2021	1	7	7	Penei Sewell	Detroit Lions	T	2x Pro Bowl (2022-2023)
2021	2	4	36	Jevon Holland	Miami Dolphins	DB	
2021	5	28	172	Deommodore Lenoir	San Francisco 49ers	DB	
2021	6	31	215	Brady Breeze	Tennessee Titans	DB	
2021	6	44	228	Thomas Graham Jr.	Chicago Bears	DB	
2022	1	5	5	Kayvon Thibodeaux	New York Giants	DE	
2023	1	17	17	Christian Gonzalez	New England Patriots	DB	
2023	3	17	80	D. J. Johnson	Carolina Panthers	LB	
2023	5	14	148	Noah Sewell	Chicago Bears	LB	
2023	6	22	199	Malaesala Aumavae-Laulu	Baltimore Ravens	T	
2023	7	26	244	Jordon Riley	New York Giants	DT	
2023	7	40	257	Alex Forsyth	Denver Broncos	C	
2024	1	12	12	Bo Nix	Denver Broncos	QB	
2024	2	12	44	Jackson Powers-Johnson	Las Vegas Raiders	C	
2024	4	2	102	Troy Franklin	Denver Broncos	WR	
2024	4	8	108	Khyree Jackson	Minnesota Vikings	CB	
2024	4	9	109	Brandon Dorlus	Atlanta Falcons	DT	
2024	4	11	111	Evan Williams	Green Bay Packers	DB	
2024	4	25	125	Bucky Irving	Tampa Bay Buccaneers	RB	
2024	6	12	188	Jamal Hill	Houston Texans	LB	
2025	1	21	21	Derrick Harmon	Pittsburgh Steelers	DT	
2025	1	29	29	Josh Conerly Jr.	Washington Commanders	OT	
2025	2	14	46	Terrance Ferguson	Los Angeles Rams	TE	
2025	3	14	78	Jordan Burch	Arizona Cardinals	DE	
2025	3	22	86	Jamaree Caldwell	Los Angeles Chargers	DT	
2025	3	30	94	Dillon Gabriel	Cleveland Browns	QB	
2025	5	9	147	Jordan James	San Francisco 49ers	RB	
2025	5	18	156	Jeffrey Bassa	Kansas City Chiefs	LB	
2025	6	28	204	Ajani Cornelius	Dallas Cowboys	OT	
2025	7	19	235	Tez Johnson	Tampa Bay Buccaneers	WR	
2026	1	16	16	Kenyon Sadiq	New York Jets	TE	
2026	1	25	25	Dillon Thieneman	Chicago Bears	DB	
2026	3	24	88	Emmanuel Pregnon	Jacksonville Jaguars	OT	
2026	4	9	109	Jadon Canady	Kansas City Chiefs	DB	
2026	4	35	135	Bryce Boettcher	Indianapolis Colts	LB	
2026	6	14	195	Malik Benson	Las Vegas Raiders	WR	
2026	6	25	206	Alex Harkey	Los Angeles Chargers	G	

== Notable undrafted players ==
Year	Name	Position	NFL team	Notes
1961	Dave Grayson	DB	Kansas City Chiefs	6× AFL All-Star (1962, 1963, 1964, 1965, 1966, 1969)
1963	Bill Swain	LB	New York Giants	
1966	Jerry Inman	DT	Denver Broncos	
1966	Pat Matson	G	Cincinnati Bengals	
1990	Derek Loville	RB	San Francisco 49ers	3× Super Bowl Champion (XXIX, XXXII, XXXIII)
1990	Terry Obee	WR	Chicago Bears	
1992	Jeff Thomason	TE	Green Bay Packers	Super Bowl Champion (XXXI)
1993	Ronnie Harris	WR	Atlanta Falcons	
2009	Jerome Boyd	LB	Oakland Raiders	
2009	Jeremiah Johnson	RB	Denver Broncos	
2009	Jerome Johnson	FB/LB	St. Louis Rams	
2010	LeGarrette Blount	RB	New England Patriots	NFL rushing touchdowns leader (2016), 3× Super Bowl Champion (XLIX, LI, LII)
2010	Will Tukuafu	FB	San Francisco 49ers	
2011	Brandon Bair	DE	Philadelphia Eagles	
2011	Drew Davis	WR	Atlanta Falcons	
2011	Jeff Maehl	WR	Philadelphia Eagles	
2011	Spencer Paysinger	LB	New York Giants	Super Bowl Champion (XLVI)
2012	Eddie Pleasant	S	Houston Texans	
2012	Darrion Weems	OT	Dallas Cowboys	
2015	Troy Hill	CB	Cleveland Browns	NFL defensive touchdowns leader (2020)
2016	Byron Marshall	RB	Philadelphia Eagles	
2017	Pharaoh Brown	TE	Houston Texans	
2017	Cameron Hunt	G	Los Angeles Chargers	
2017	Johnny Mundt	TE	Los Angeles Rams	Super Bowl Champion (LVI)
2019	Tony Brooks-James	RB	Atlanta Falcons	
2019	Henry Mondeaux	DE	Pittsburgh Steelers	
2020	Juwan Johnson	WR	New Orleans Saints	
2022	Anthony Brown	QB	Baltimore Ravens	
2022	Johnny Johnson III	WR	Houston Texans	
2022	Verone McKinley III	S	Miami Dolphins	
2022	CJ Verdell	RB	Indianapolis Colts	
2022	Mykael Wright	CB	Arizona Cardinals	
2023	T. J. Bass	OG	Dallas Cowboys	
2023	Chase Cota	WR	Detroit Lions	
2023	Bennett Williams	S	Miami Dolphins	
2024	Popo Aumavae	DT	Carolina Panthers	
2024	Steven Jones	OL	Jacksonville Jaguars	
2024	Casey Rogers	DT	New York Giants	
2024	Taki Taimani	DT	Minnesota Vikings	
2025	Traeshon Holden	WR	Dallas Cowboys	
2025	Brandon Johnson	S	Philadelphia Eagles	
2025	Jabbar Muhammad	CB	Jacksonville Jaguars	
2025	Dontae Manning	CB	Atlanta Falcons	
2025	Nikko Reed	DB	Los Angeles Chargers	
2026	Luke Basso	LS	Denver Broncos	
2026	Noah Whittington	RB	Houston Texans	
2026	Isaiah World	OT	Los Angeles Chargers	
