= Riverside High School (Durham, North Carolina) =

American public school in North Carolina

Location
- 3218 Rose of Sharon Road; Durham, North Carolina 27712; United States; 36°03′44″N 78°56′36″W

Information
- Other name: RHS
- Type: Public
- Motto: "Roll Pirates, Roll!"
- Established: 1991 (35 years ago)
- School district: Durham Public Schools
- Superintendent: Dr. Anthony Lewis
- CEEB code: 341081
- Principal: Gloria Woods-Weeks
- Teaching staff: 93.59 (FTE)
- Grades: 9–12
- Enrollment: 1,900 (2024–2025)
- Student to teacher ratio: 20.30
- Colors: Purple and White
- Mascot: Lenny the Pirate
- Nickname: Pirates
- Newspaper: The Pirates' Hook
- Yearbook: The Helm
- Website: dpsnc.net/domain/57

Riverside High School is a public high school located in Durham, North Carolina. The principal of Riverside High is Dr. Gloria Woods-Weeks, who joined as principal in 2021. Current members of the school administrative team include Dr. Will Okun, Mr. Kwame Stith, Ms. Jasmine McKoy, Mrs. Tammy Patterson and Mr. Gene Jones. The school enrolls students from grades 9–12. The school was founded in 1991 and became one of the five Durham Public High Schools.

== History ==
Riverside High School opened in 1991 (the first class graduated in 1993) and currently enrolls approximately 1,900 students. It is one of five public high schools in the Durham Public School System. The school offers classes on a block schedule on a semester basis, with students taking 4 classes—generally 2 core and 2 elective—each semester. Riverside is an accredited school and is also home to the Durham Public Schools' engineering program, which uses the national Project Lead the Way curriculum. This offers a variety of engineering classes to the students enrolled in the program with AP level weighting.

Riverside's sixteen sports teams are part of the PAC-6 Conference, which includes schools in Durham County and the neighboring counties of Orange and Person.

In 2017 the principal, Tonya Williams, proposed a "SMART Lunch" program where there is a single lunch period that is one hour long and students are free to attend certain clubs, replacing the former scheme where students are assigned to one of three lunch slots at different times in the school day. It was enacted in the fall of 2019. In summer 2023 Dr. Gloria Wood-Weeks after much deliberation with her administrative team and staff, rebranded Smart Lunch to become Pirate Block. The rationale of the rebranding is to provide more structure to all students and still allow them to participate in clubs as well as receive tutoring in classes. It features two lunch periods and highlights a different class period each day to allow an opportunity for each student to receive support in that class.

During Pirate Block, students report to the featured class for that day. Attendance is taken and students are dismissed for lunch, dismissed to a club they have joined, or they begin with receiving tutoring from their teacher. While half the student body is at lunch the other half is participating in Pirate Block activities. The days are as follows: on Mondays first period is the featured class for Prate Block on Tuesdays and Wednesdays is second period, on Thursdays is third period, and on Fridays is fourth period. Pirate Block was enacted Fall 2023. In the fall of 2025, Riverside decided to transition to a traditional, A, B, and C lunch schedule to address concerns about student accountability. This change aligns Riverside with other high schools in Durham Public Schools.

During the 2025 school year, Riverside began to have an unusual amount of lockdowns within short periods of time. 10 lockdowns occurred during the entire year. Most lockdowns were reportedly anonymous tips coming from the Say Something app, founded by the Sandy Hook Promise. Since August 2026, Riverside has went on 4 lockdowns, all from anonymous tips. None of the 14 lockdowns have led to any prosecution. The district hosted a town hall on October 15th, 2026 where they addressed concerns from parents, students and staff. District leaders say they suspect the tips come from the same person, and are investigating the misuse.

== Achievements ==
In 2007, Riverside was ranked as the 834th high school in America by Newsweek.

In 2011, Riverside's Student Newspaper, The Pirates' Hook, was awarded the best student run newspaper in North Carolina.

Riverside’s Engineering Program has received the PLTW Distinguished High School recognition every year since 2017.

== Athletics ==
Riverside High School sports teams are known as the Pirates. The school is a member of the North Carolina High School Athletic Association (NCHSAA) and are classified as a 7A school. They are a part of the Tobacco Road 6A/7A Athletic Conference (TRAC).

=== Wrestling ===
The Riverside Pirate wrestling team has won a total of seven state championships. They were the NCHSAA 4A dual team state champions in 1995, 2002, 2003 and 2004, and were the NCHSAA 4A state tournament team state champions in 1994, 2002 and 2004.

=== Volleyball ===
Riverside's girls volleyball program has won two state championships, winning the class NCHSAA 4A title in 1998 and 2001.

== Notable alumni ==
- Scott Brown, writer, director, and comedian
- Jeffrey Gunter, NFL linebacker
- Mary Katharine Ham, journalist, senior writer at The Federalist, CNN contributor, and former Fox News contributor
- Chef Henny, rapper
- Megan Hodge, indoor volleyball silver medalist at the 2012 Summer Olympics
- Anthony King, writer, director, and comedian
- Jordon Riley, NFL defensive end
- Ally Blake, broadcast meteorologist at WMAR-2 NEWS
- Weslye Saunders, NFL tight end
- Dominique Thompson, former American football wide receiver
- Abel Trujillo, mixed martial artist who competed in the lightweight division in the UFC
- T. J. Warren, NBA player
