= George Andrews (American football) =

American football player (born 1955)

No. 52
- Position: Linebacker

Personal information
- Born: November 28, 1955 (age 70); Omaha, Nebraska, U.S.
- Listed height: 6 ft 3 in (1.91 m)
- Listed weight: 226 lb (103 kg)

Career information
- High school: Omaha Burke
- College: Nebraska
- NFL draft: 1979: 1st round, 19th overall pick

Career history
- Los Angeles Rams (1979–1984)

Awards and highlights
- Second-team All-American (1978); First-team All-Big Eight (1978)

Career NFL statistics
- Fumble recoveries: 7
- Sacks: 12.5
- Interceptions: 1
- Stats at Pro Football Reference

George Eldon Andrews, II (born November 28, 1955) is an American former professional football player who was a linebacker in the National Football League (NFL). He is a graduate of the University of Nebraska–Lincoln who played in the National Football League (NFL) from 1979 to 1984 for the Los Angeles Rams.

== Early life ==
Andrews attended Omaha Burke High School in Omaha, Nebraska where he excelled in both football and basketball.

== College career ==
Andrews was a three-year starter for the Nebraska Cornhuskers at defensive end. As a sophomore, in 1976, he had 49 tackles, six for a loss and recovered two fumbles. The team ended the season defeating the Texas Tech Red Raiders, 27–24 in the 1976 Bluebonnet Bowl. As a junior in 1977, George Andrews made 84 tackles with eight for a loss, knocked down three passes, intercepted one pass and recovered one fumble. For his efforts, he was voted honorable mention All-Big Eight. The 1977 season ended with Nebraska beating the University of North Carolina 21–17 in the Liberty Bowl. In that game, Andrews totaled 19 tackles.

As a senior, in 1978, Andrews was a first-team All-American by NEA and "Football News." He was also a second-team choice on the AP and UPI teams. George Andrew was also a consensus All-Big Eight selection. His statistics were the best of his career, with 84 tackles (good for 3rd on the team) with 10 of those coming behind the line as sacks. Andrews broke up three passes and intercepted another. He ended his career with 217 tackles, with 24 of those totaling 118 yards in losses.

In addition, Andrews was an Academic All-American as well with a 3.1 GPA in Business Administration.

== Professional career ==
Andrews was selected as a linebacker in the 1979 NFL draft, the 19th pick overall by the Los Angeles Rams. His tackling prowess, 360-pound bench press and 4.7 40-yard dash speed seemed ideal for a 230-pound NFL outside linebacker, or a stand-up defensive end.

As a rookie, Andrews played well on special teams, totaling 33 tackles and a fumble recovery. In 1980, Andrews began the season with a thigh injury, missing three games. However, in the tenth week of the season, starting linebacker Bob Brudzinski left the team and Andrews started the remaining seven games in Brudzinski's place. In the final six games, the Rams defense allowed only 75 points in a defensive surge that helped them to make the playoffs. Andrews ended the season with 44 tackles, three passes defensed, one forced fumble and one fumble recovery.

In 1981, Andrews was the Rams' starter all season at right linebacker. He was the Rams' fifth leading tackler with 75, with three going for a loss and he had a half quarterback sack, the first of his career. In the strike-shortened 1982 season, Andrews started all nine games, recording 67 tackles, tying with Johnnie Johnson for the team lead. He also had six tackles for losses and recorded three sacks. He recorded a forced fumble and batted away five passes either in pass rushes or pass coverages.

The following season, Andrews had a new coach, John Robinson, and a new defensive scheme. Andrews would be an outside linebacker in a 3–4 defense, similar to the position he had played in college. He responded with 77 tackles and three sacks. His first NFL interception, he returned 22 yards and it led to a Ram offensive score. Nine of his tackles (including sacks) went for losses and Andrews defended 12 passes, the most among Rams' linebackers.

In 1984, Andrews was off to a great start, sacking Gary Hogeboom on the third play of the season that forced Hogeboom to cough up the ball and Jack Youngblood recovered it on the Dallas 2-yard line, where 2,000-yard rusher Eric Dickerson ran it over for the first Rams score of the 1984 season. Andrews prowess at sacking quarterbacks in 1984 prompted Bill Bain to call Andrews, "the White Lawrence Taylor"

But his luck seemed to run out when he injured his knee in Week 10 against the St. Louis Cardinals. Through 10 full weeks Andrews recorded 43 tackles, 13 of them were for losses with six being quarterback sacks, which was second on the team, behind Youngblood. Andrews played one series in Week Eleven of 1984 but was put on injured reserve for the remainder of the season.

In 1985, Andrews, who had rehabbed the knee, attempted a comeback but another knee injury in training camp in 1985 ended the comeback. Andrews was attempting a quick maneuver around a New England Patriot blocker in the final exhibition game of 1985. As he moved, untouched by defenders, Andrews planted his right foot and felt his cleats catch in the turf. "I felt my knee explode," he said.

In 1986, the Rams offered George Andrews a shot as an inside linebacker, to take some pressure off of him and the speed he lost due to two major knee surgeries in two seasons. George Andrews played inside linebacker at training camp that year but didn't like it. On August 25, 1986, his career ended as the Rams released him.

Andrews' "Plan B" (if he could not return to football) was to finish taking the required test to become a certified financial planner. He had taken four of the six required tests to become a CFP.

Andrews played six seasons for the Rams, playing 80 games, starting 58. He ended his career with 12½ sacks, 7 fumble recoveries, 1 interception, 23 passes defensed, and 6 forced fumbles to match his 340 tackles. His right outside linebacker job had been held by a fine player, Mike Wilcher, since 1984.
