= Devon Jackson =

American football player (born 2004)

No. 9 – Oregon Ducks
- Position: Linebacker
- Class: Redshirt Senior

Personal information
- Born: May 21, 2004 (age 22); Champaign, Illinois, U.S.
- Listed height: 6 ft 2 in (1.88 m)
- Listed weight: 242 lb (110 kg)

Career information
- High school: Burke (Omaha, Nebraska)
- College: Oregon (2022–present)
- Stats at ESPN

Devon Jackson (born May 21, 2004) is an American college football linebacker for the Oregon Ducks.

== Early life ==
Jackson was born in Champaign, Illinois, and his father played college football for the Illinois Fighting Illini. He later moved to Indiana and then, at age nine, to Nebraska. Jackson attended Omaha Burke High School where he competed in football as a linebacker and ran track. He totaled 36 tackles while winning a district title as a sophomore in 2019. In 2020, the season was canceled due to the COVID-19 pandemic.

Jackson then recorded 52 tackles, 10.5 tackles-for-loss (TFLs) and 3.0 sacks as a senior while earning first-team all-metro and all-state honors and being a semifinalist for the high school Butkus Award. He was also invited to the All-American Bowl. A four-star recruit, he committed to play college football for the Oregon Ducks. During high school, Jackson was also a Class A state champion in the 100 metres and the 200 metres.

== College career ==
Jackson redshirted and appeared in five games as a true freshman at Oregon in 2022. He then appeared in 12 games in 2023 and recorded 17 tackles and 1.5 TFLs. In 2024, Jackson played behind Bryce Boettcher and Jeffrey Bassa, posting 47 tackles and 1.5 sacks. He was set to be a starter in 2025 but then was limited by injuries, finishing with 41 tackles. Jackson returned to Oregon for a final season in 2026. He was named the 11th player on The Athletic's "Freaks List" for 2026, highlighting the most athletic college football players.
