= Omaha Burke High School =

Public high school in Omaha, Nebraska

Coordinates: 41°15′41.55458″N 96°06′15.53306″W

Burke High School

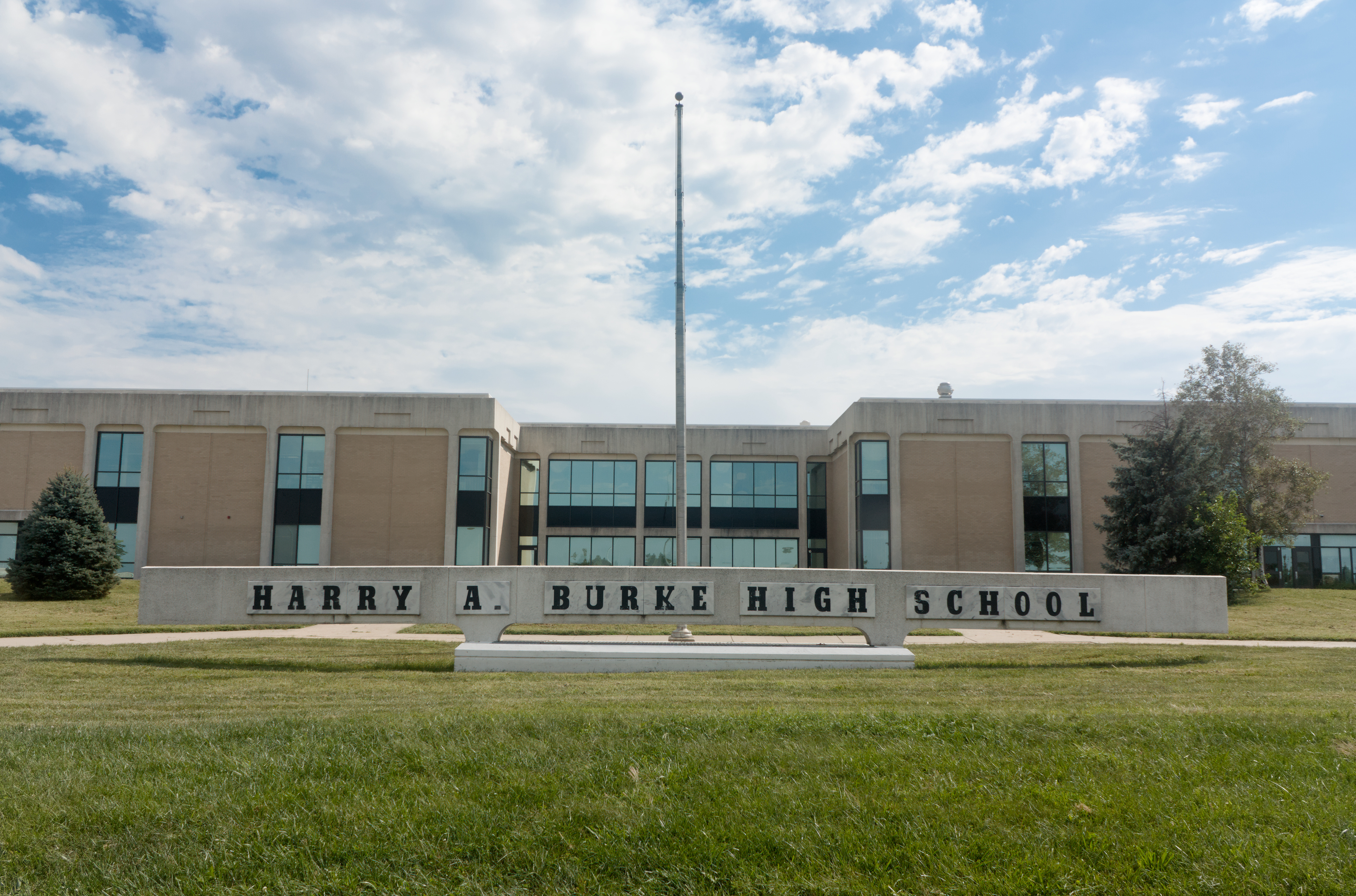
- 12200 Burke Blvd; Omaha, Nebraska; United States

Information
- Type: Public high school
- School district: Omaha Public Schools
- Principal: Darren Rasmussen
- Teaching staff: 88.00 (FTE)
- Grades: 9–12
- Enrollment: 1,729 (2023-2024)
- Student to teacher ratio: 19.65
- Colors: Black and gold
- Mascot: Bulldog
- Website: http://www.ops.org/burke

Harry A. Burke High School is a secondary school located in Omaha, Nebraska, United States. The principal is Darren Rasmussen. The school's mascot is the Bulldog.

Each year in May, the Nebraska State Track Meet is held at the school. Its stadium was renovated in 2008.

The school property abuts the eastbound lanes of West Dodge Road (US 6).

== Name ==
Burke High School was dedicated to Harry A. Burke in November 1967. Burke, who was Omaha Public Schools superintendent from 1946 to 1962, actively prevented black educators from having positions of authority during his tenure. Among Burke's racist statements was "I would never want black people in a position of power, where white children would be educated." A 2019 op-ed in school newspaper The Burke Beat and a June 2020 petition both called for the school to change its name. Alternative namesakes were suggested, including Lucinda Gamble, Omaha Public Schools' first African American teacher.

== Extracurricular activities ==
=== Academic Decathlon ===
Burke has participated in the Academic Decathlon competition for 14 years, and has been the Nebraska state champion seven times. Their chief rivals are Creighton Preparatory School and Pius X High School. Burke holds the record for the highest overall score by a Nebraska team (48,337), set in 2008. In 2009, the Burke Academic Decathlon team placed second in Division I and third overall at the national competition.

=== Athletics ===
Burke athletic teams have won 39 state championships.

State championships
Season	Sport	Number of championships	Year
Fall	Golf, girls'	1	1982
Fall	Tennis, boys'	1	1986
Fall	Football	1	2018
Fall	Cross country, boys'	6	1975, 1976, 1978, 1979, 1981, 1983
Winter	Wrestling, boys'	1	2000
Winter	Basketball, boys'	2	1977, 1986
Winter	Basketball, girls'	1	1978
Winter	Swimming, boys'	3	1992, 1994, 1995
Winter	Swimming, girls'	5	1989, 1990, 1991, 1992, 1994
Spring	Golf, boys'	3	1976, 1981, 1992
Spring	Soccer, boys'	2	1990, 1994
Spring	Tennis, girls'	7	1975, 1981, 1984, 1992, 1993, 1994, 1997
Spring	Track and field, girls'	1	2004
Spring	Baseball	5	1970, 1975, 1979, 1992, 2000
Total		39	

== Notable alumni ==
- George Andrews, professional football player for the Los Angeles Rams, 19th overall pick in the 1979 NFL Draft
- Craig Anton, supporting character on Phil of the Future
- Joshua Becker, minimalist writer
- Barney Cotton, offensive line coach for the Nebraska Cornhuskers football team
- Jason Dourisseau, professional basketball player
- Mike Freeman, jazz musician
- Alex Henery, professional football player
- Ricky Henry, former offensive lineman for the Nebraska Cornhuskers and former NFL player
- Devon Jackson, college football linebacker for the Oregon Ducks
- Rich King, professional basketball player
- Rod Kush, professional football player and founder of Rod Kush Furniture
- Xavier Watts, NFL safety for the Atlanta Falcons
- Jackson Withrow, professional tennis player
