= Justius Lowe =

American football player

No. 18 – San Diego State Aztecs
- Position: Wide receiver
- Class: Redshirt Senior

Personal information
- Listed height: 6 ft 1 in (1.85 m)
- Listed weight: 190 lb (86 kg)

Career information
- High school: Lake Oswego (Lake Oswego, Oregon)
- College: Oregon (2022–2025); San Diego State (2026–present)
- Stats at ESPN

Justius Lowe is an American college football wide receiver for the San Diego State Aztecs. He previously played for the Oregon Ducks.

== Early life ==
Lowe attended Lake Oswego High School in Lake Oswego, Oregon. He was rated as a three-star recruit, and committed to play college football for the Oregon Ducks over offers from schools such as Arizona, Arizona State, Colorado, Florida, Notre Dame, Oregon State, and USC.

== College career ==
=== Oregon ===
During his first two collegiate seasons in 2022 and 2023, he was redshirted while appearing in just four games. In week 7 of the 2024 season, Lowe played a career-high 44 snaps and made one catch for nine yards in a win over Ohio State. In week 8, he made his first career start, recording two receptions for 28 yards in a win versus Purdue. In week 9, Lowe hauled in his first career touchdown reception in a win over Illinois. In week 12, he suffered an injury which caused him to miss the regular season finale and the 2024 Big Ten Football Championship Game. Lowe finished the 2024 season with 21 receptions for 203 yards and a touchdown in 11 games played.

On December 17, 2025, Lowe announced that he would enter the transfer portal.

=== San Diego State ===
On January 13, 2026, Lowe announced that he would transfer to San Diego State.
