= Chef Henny =

American fashion designer, singer, and chef (born 1996)

Harvey Justice III
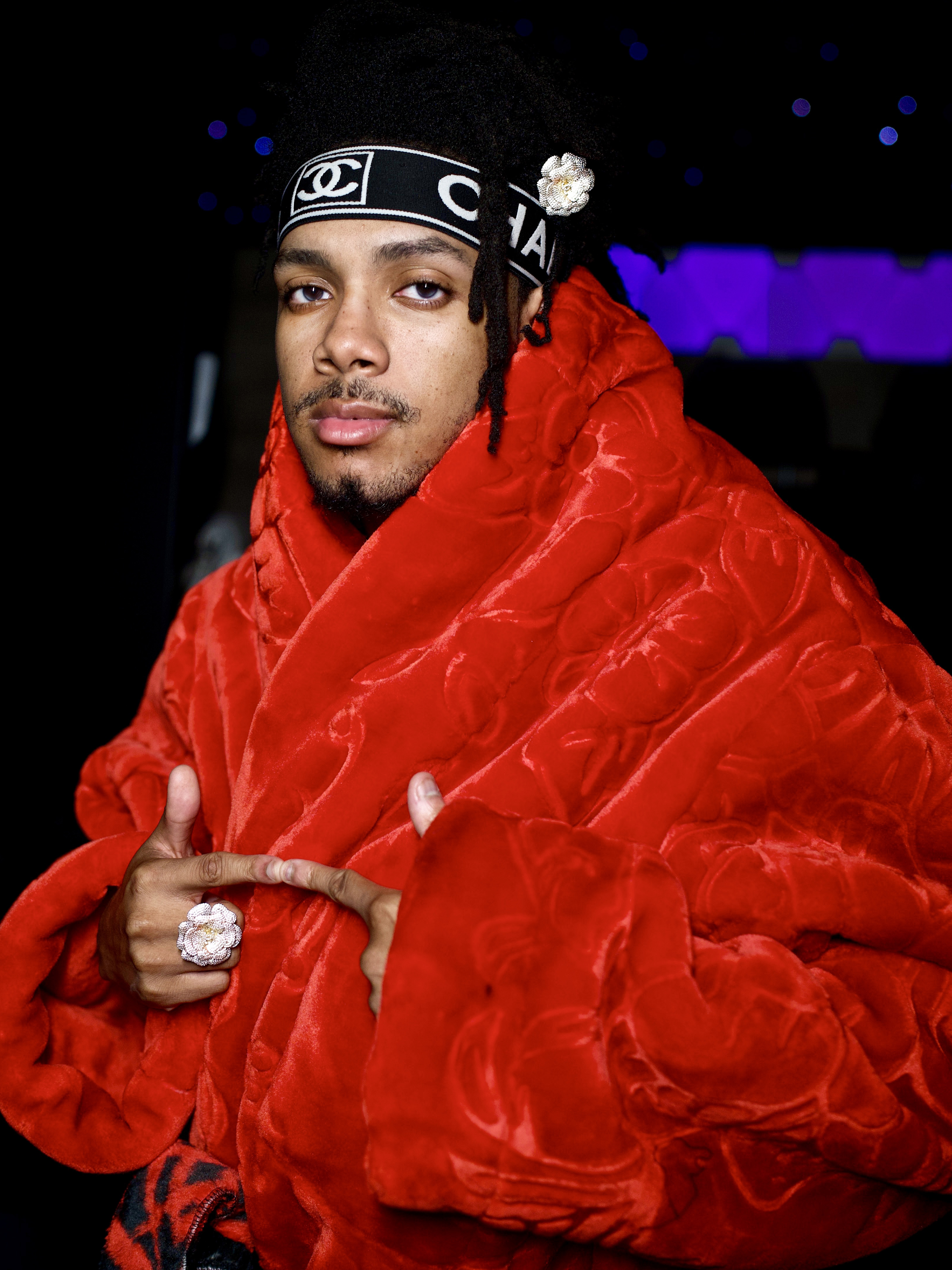

Background information
- Also known as: Harvey J, OMGITSHARVEYJ
- Born: Harvey Lee Justice III; March 2, 1996 (age 30); Durham, North Carolina, U.S.
- Occupations: Fashion Designer; Chef; Online Personality; Musician
- Years active: 2014–present
- Website: omgitsharveyj.com

Harvey Lee Justice III (born March 2, 1996), better known as his online alias Chef Henny, is an American recording artist, fashion designer, chef, and internet personality. He is most known for his entrepreneurship and alignment with the Hennessy Cognac brand. He first gained recognition posting cooking skits to Facebook in May 2016, and has since accumulated millions of views on his content.

== Fashion career ==
Harvey founded "Daddy Robes" in 2020 following a failed sponsorship attempt with Versace. Daddy Robes quickly gained recognition for its distinctive designs, comfort, and hand-made construction. Trippie Redd reportedly paid $11,111.11 for a robe from the brand. Daddy's visibility grew through endorsements by celebrities such as Snoop Dogg, Logan Paul, and Chris Brown. Justice further expanded his fashion footprint with the creation of the Daddy Museum, a boutique showroom located in California's Inland Empire that doubles as a lifestyle exhibit reflecting his personal brand.

== Musical career ==
Harvey began his musical career posting to his Facebook page. In 2012 he featured on Driicky Graham's debut single "Dial Tone". In 2015 he made his own solo debut "Make It Bounce" that was released under Owsla. After cosigns from Skrillex, his debut single was in the Beatport Top 100 Dubstep Charts for 96 days. On March 22, Harvey J self-released his debut mixtape “Pancakes & Hennessy”.

== Personal life ==
Harvey J was born and spent the majority of his life in Durham, NC. He cites Durham and growing up around violence as his inspiration to be an entertainer.

On June 30, 2023, Harvey's first son, Harvey Justice IV was born.

== Controversies ==
Harvey J has been openly against signing to a record label. In June, 2016 Uproxx reported that Harvey J received an offer totaling $3,000,000 from Belaire and DJ Khaled's We The Best management to replace his branding alignment with Belaire Rosé Lux instead of Hennessy. This offer was subsequently denied by Harvey prompting a brief social media feud between the two artists.

In 2018, Harvey Justice III reportedly signed to Fenty Entertainment. Shortly afterwards he alleged misconduct by Rihanna's father Ronald Fenty. He claimed Fenty Entertainment falsely represented itself as being affiliated with singer Rihanna, and that other individuals had also come forward with similar experiences.
