= Steve Bunker =

Former American football tight end

Profile
- Positions: Split end, tight end

Personal information
- Born: July 17, 1945; Seattle, Washington, U.S.
- Died: January 27, 2006 (aged 60); Umatilla, Oregon, U.S.
- Listed height: 6 ft 2 in (1.88 m)
- Listed weight: 209 lb (95 kg)

Career information
- High school: Pendleton (OR)
- College: Oregon (1963–1966)

Career history
- Los Angeles Rams (1967–1968)*; Spokane Shockers (1968)
- * Offseason or practice squad member only

Stephen Allen Bunker (July 17, 1945 – January 27, 2006) was an American football tight end and split end. He was the career receptions leader at Oregon at the end of his college career and led the Athletic Association of Western Universities (AAWU) in 1965 with 51 receptions for 838 yards.

== Early life ==
Bunker was born in 1945 at Seattle, Washington. He attended Pendleton High School in Pendelton, Oregon. He was an all-state athlete at Pendleton in football, basketball, and baseball, and also competed in track. A left-handed pitcher, he compiled a 23–11 win-loss record as a high school senior was drafted out of high school as a pitcher by the Pittsburgh Pirates. As a senior in football, he caught 61 passes for 862 yards and 14 touchdowns.

== Oregon Ducks ==
Bunker played college football for the Oregon Ducks from 1963 to 1966 and was a three-year starter from 1964 to 1966. In 1965, he led the AAWU with 51 receptions for 838 yards. His 838 receiving yards ranked sixth nationally. He finished as Oregon's career leader with 103 receptions and also set single-season records for receptions (51), receiving yards (838), and touchdown receptions (9).

== Professional football ==
Bunker was selected by the Los Angeles Rams in the 15th round (382nd overall) of the 1967 NFL draft. He signed with the Rams in June 1968. He remained with the Rams through 1968 but did not appear in any regular-season games.

== Later life ==
Bunker died from cancer in January 2006 at age 60.
