= Brady Breeze =

American football player (born 1997)

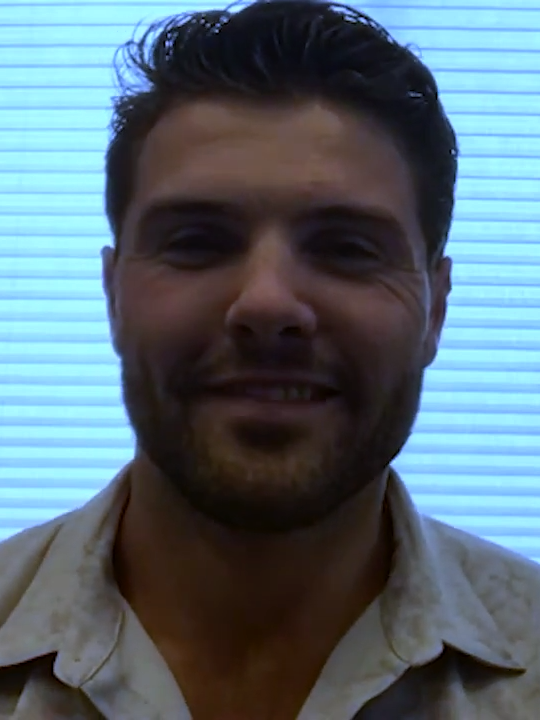
- Breeze in 2021

No. 24
- Position: Safety

Personal information
- Born: October 9, 1997 (age 29); Medford, Oregon, U.S.
- Listed height: 6 ft 0 in (1.83 m)
- Listed weight: 205 lb (93 kg)

Career information
- High school: Central Catholic (Portland, Oregon)
- College: Oregon (2016–2020)
- NFL draft: 2021: 6th round, 215th overall pick

Career history
- Tennessee Titans (2021); Detroit Lions (2021–2022); Seattle Seahawks (2023)*; Houston Texans (2023)*; Cleveland Browns (2024)*; Arlington Renegades (2025)*; Calgary Stampeders (2025)
- * Offseason or practice squad member only

Awards and highlights
- 2020 Rose Bowl MVP (Defense); First-team All-Pac-12 (2019)

Career NFL statistics
- Total tackles: 6
- Stats at Pro Football Reference
- Stats at CFL.ca

Brady James Breeze (born October 9, 1997) is an American former professional football player who was a safety in the National Football League (NFL) and Canadian Football League (CFL). He played college football for the Oregon Ducks.

== Professional career ==
Pre-draft measurables
Height	Weight	Arm length	Hand span	40-yard dash	10-yard split	20-yard split	20-yard shuttle	Three-cone drill	Vertical jump	Broad jump	Bench press
5 ft 11 3/4 in (1.82 m)	197 lb (89 kg)	30 1/2 in (0.77 m)	9 1/2 in (0.24 m)	4.55 s	1.63 s	2.64 s	4.23 s	7.03 s	38.0 in (0.97 m)	10 ft 0 in (3.05 m)	20 reps
All values from Pro Day

=== Tennessee Titans ===
Breeze was selected by the Tennessee Titans in the sixth round, 215th overall, of the 2021 NFL draft. He signed his four-year rookie contract with Tennessee on May 17, 2021. Breeze was placed on injured reserve on September 3. He was activated on October 19. Breeze was waived by the Titans on December 11.

=== Detroit Lions ===
On December 13, 2021, Breeze was claimed off waivers by the Detroit Lions. He was waived by Detroit on August 16, 2022. On November 1, Breeze was re-signed to the team's practice squad.

Breeze signed a reserve/future contract with Detroit on January 9, 2023. On August 29, Breeze was waived by the Lions as part of final roster cuts.

=== Seattle Seahawks ===
On September 4, 2023, Breeze was signed to the Seattle Seahawks' practice squad; however, he was released eight days later.

=== Houston Texans ===
On November 7, 2023, Breeze was signed to the Houston Texans' practice squad. He was not signed to a reserve/future contract after the season and thus became a free agent when his practice squad contract expired.

=== Cleveland Browns ===
On June 5, 2024, Breeze was signed by the Cleveland Browns. He was waived by Cleveland on August 16.

=== Arlington Renegades ===
On January 30, 2025, Breeze signed with the Arlington Renegades of the United Football League (UFL). He was released by the Renegades on March 20.

=== Calgary Stampeders ===
On August 17, 2025, Breeze signed with the Calgary Stampeders of the Canadian Football League (CFL).

== Personal life ==
He is the nephew of former Oregon Ducks safety Chad Cota, and cousin of Oregon Ducks wide receiver Chase Cota.
