= Chad Cota =

American football player (born 1971)

No. 37
- Position: Safety

Personal information
- Born: August 13, 1971 (age 55); Ashland, Oregon, U.S.
- Listed height: 6 ft 0 in (1.83 m)
- Listed weight: 196 lb (89 kg)

Career information
- High school: Ashland
- College: Oregon
- NFL draft: 1995: 7th round, 209th overall pick

Career history
- Carolina Panthers (1995–1997); New Orleans Saints (1998); Indianapolis Colts (1999–2001); San Francisco 49ers (2002)*; St. Louis Rams (2002)
- * Offseason or practice squad member only

Awards and highlights
- Second-team All-American (1994); First-team All-Pac-10 (1994); Second-team All-Pac-10 (1993)

Career NFL statistics
- Tackles: 538
- Sacks: 4
- Passes defended: 15
- Interceptions: 15
- Forced fumbles: 2
- Fumble recoveries: 6
- Stats at Pro Football Reference

Chad Cota (born August 8, 1971) is an American former professional football player who was a safety in the National Football League (NFL). He attended Ashland High School and played college football for the Oregon Ducks. He was selected by the Carolina Panthers in the 1995 NFL draft and went on to play for the New Orleans Saints, Indianapolis Colts, and the St. Louis Rams over eight seasons, retiring in 2003.

== Professional career ==
Cota was named to the Carolina Panthers 10-year anniversary team as a safety. His interception in the end zone versus Pittsburgh on the Steelers final possession to preserve victory and clinch the NFC West division title is named as the #10 most memorable play in Carolina Panthers history. He and Pat Terrell both had 49-yard interception returns against Dallas in the first round of the 1996 playoffs, thereby tying each other for the career, season, and single-game Panthers' franchise records for post-season interception return yards.

== NFL career statistics ==
Legend
| **Bold** | Career high |

=== Regular season ===
| Year | Team | Games | | Tackles | | | | Interceptions | | | | Fumbles | | | |
| Year | Team | GP | GS | Comb | Solo | Ast | Sck | Int | Yds | TD | Lng | FF | FR | Yds | TD |
|---|---|---|---|---|---|---|---|---|---|---|---|---|---|---|---|
| 1995 | CAR | 16 | 0 | 4 | 4 | 0 | 0.0 | 0 | 0 | 0 | 0 | 0 | **1** | 0 | 0 |
| 1996 | CAR | 16 | 2 | 42 | 31 | 11 | 1.0 | **5** | **63** | 0 | **35** | 0 | **1** | 0 | 0 |
| 1997 | CAR | 16 | 16 | **117** | **86** | **31** | 1.0 | 2 | 28 | 0 | 15 | 0 | **1** | 0 | 0 |
| 1998 | NOR | 16 | 16 | 96 | 71 | 25 | **2.0** | 4 | 16 | 0 | 9 | **1** | **1** | 0 | 0 |
| 1999 | IND | 15 | 15 | 87 | 65 | 22 | 0.0 | 0 | 0 | 0 | 0 | **1** | **1** | **25** | **1** |
| 2000 | IND | 16 | 16 | 87 | 67 | 20 | 0.0 | 2 | 3 | 0 | 3 | 0 | 0 | 0 | 0 |
| 2001 | IND | 16 | 16 | 94 | 73 | 21 | 0.0 | 2 | 21 | 0 | 12 | 0 | **1** | 9 | 0 |
| 2002 | STL | 14 | 1 | 11 | 10 | 1 | 0.0 | 0 | 0 | 0 | 0 | 0 | 0 | 0 | 0 |
| Career | | 125 | 82 | 538 | 407 | 131 | 4.0 | 15 | 131 | 0 | 35 | 2 | 6 | 34 | 1 |

=== Playoffs ===
| Year | Team | Games | | Tackles | | | | Interceptions | | | | Fumbles | | | |
| Year | Team | GP | GS | Comb | Solo | Ast | Sck | Int | Yds | TD | Lng | FF | FR | Yds | TD |
|---|---|---|---|---|---|---|---|---|---|---|---|---|---|---|---|
| 1996 | CAR | 2 | 0 | 2 | 2 | 0 | 0.0 | 1 | **49** | 0 | **49** | 0 | 0 | 0 | 0 |
| 1999 | IND | 1 | 1 | 5 | 4 | 1 | 0.0 | 0 | 0 | 0 | 0 | 0 | 0 | 0 | 0 |
| 2000 | IND | 1 | 1 | **10** | **6** | **4** | 0.0 | **2** | 23 | 0 | 23 | 0 | 0 | 0 | 0 |
| Career | | 4 | 2 | 17 | 12 | 5 | 0.0 | 3 | 72 | 0 | 49 | 0 | 0 | 0 | 0 |

== Personal life ==
He is the father of New York Giants wide receiver Chase Cota and the uncle of Houston Texans safety Brady Breeze
