= Dave Iuli =

American football player

No. 74 – Oregon Ducks
- Position: Offensive lineman
- Class: Redshirt Junior

Personal information
- Born: 2003 or 2004 (age 22–23); American Samoa
- Listed height: 6 ft 3 in (1.91 m)
- Listed weight: 332 lb (151 kg)

Career information
- High school: Puyallup (Puyallup, Washington, U.S.)
- College: Oregon (2022–present)

Awards and highlights
- Third-team All-Big Ten (2025)
- Stats at ESPN

Dave Iuli (born 2003 or 2004) is an American Samoan college football offensive lineman for the Oregon Ducks.

Iuli was born in American Samoa. He attended Puyallup High School in Puyallup, Washington, where he was a four-star college football recruit.
