= Chase Cota =

American football player (born 1999)

No. 23 – Nojima Sagamihara Rise
- Position: Wide receiver

Personal information
- Born: November 9, 1999 (age 26); Medford, Oregon, U.S.
- Listed height: 6 ft 3 in (1.91 m)
- Listed weight: 200 lb (91 kg)

Career information
- High school: South Medford
- College: UCLA (2018–2021); Oregon (2022)
- NFL draft: 2023: undrafted

Career history
- Detroit Lions (2023)*; Kansas City Chiefs (2023)*; Houston Texans (2023)*; New York Giants (2024)*; Cleveland Browns (2025)*; Nojima Sagamihara Rise (2026–present)
- * Offseason or practice squad member only
- Stats at Pro Football Reference

Chase Cota (born November 9, 1999) is an American professional football wide receiver. He played college football for the UCLA Bruins and Oregon Ducks.

== College career ==
Cota began his college football at UCLA. During his freshman year in 2018, he appeared in all 12 games, being one of only two freshmen on the offense to do so, and had 13 receptions for 168 yards. During his sophomore year in 2019, he played in all 12 games, making 10 starts, and had 25 receptions for 350 yards and three touchdowns. He had the second-highest yards-per-reception average on the team with 14.0. During his junior year in 2020 he played in all seven games, making five starts, and had 11 receptions for 79 yards and two touchdowns in a season that was cancelled due to the COVID-19 pandemic. During his senior year in 2021 he played in all 12 games, making 10 starts, and had 18 receptions for 286 yards and one touchdown. He placed second in yards per catch on the team, gaining an average of 15.9 yards per reception.

On February 18, 2022, Cota announced he was transferring to Oregon, the same college his father Chad Cota attended. He finished his career at UCLA with 67 receptions for 883 yards and six touchdowns. During his fifth-year senior year in 2022 he played in 10 of Oregon's 13 games, making nine starts, and had 36 receptions for 497 yards, and a career-high three touchdowns. He played the first eight games of the season, before getting injured on October 29, 2022, in a game against California. As a result, he missed the next three games due to injury. At the time of his injury he was the team's second-leading receiver in yards with 313, trailing only Troy Franklin. Following the season he was named an All-Pac-12 Conference honorable mention. He finished his college career with 103 receptions for 1,380 yards and nine touchdowns in 53 games.

== Professional career ==
Pre-draft measurables
Height	Weight	Arm length	Hand span	40-yard dash	10-yard split	20-yard split	20-yard shuttle	Three-cone drill	Vertical jump	Broad jump	Bench press
6 ft 3 1/4 in (1.91 m)	201 lb (91 kg)	32 in (0.81 m)	9 3/4 in (0.25 m)	4.50 s	1.56 s	2.59 s	4.14 s	6.86 s	37.5 in (0.95 m)	10 ft 6 in (3.20 m)	10 reps

=== Detroit Lions ===
On May 12, 2023, the Detroit Lions signed Cota to a three-year, $2.71 million contract as an undrafted free agent. During his preseason debut on August 11, 2023, in a game against the New York Giants, he led the team with four receptions on seven targets for 60 yards. He was waived on August 29, 2023.

=== Kansas City Chiefs ===
On September 26, 2023, Cota was signed to the Kansas City Chiefs' practice squad. He was released on December 5.

=== Houston Texans ===
On December 12, 2023, the Houston Texans signed Cota to their practice squad, joining him with his cousin, Brady Breeze. He was not signed to a reserve/future contract after the season and thus became a free agent when his practice squad contract expired.

=== New York Giants ===
On January 23, 2024, Cota signed a reserve/future contract with the New York Giants. On June 18, Cota was placed on injured reserve after suffering a fractured collarbone during minicamp. He was released on September 13.

=== Cleveland Browns ===
On July 31, 2025, Cota signed with the Cleveland Browns. He was waived on August 12. The Browns re-signed Cota on August 21 and waived him again five days later as part of final roster cuts.

=== Nojima Sagamihara Rise ===
On April 1, 2026, Cota signed with the Nojima Sagamihara Rise of the Japanese X-League.

== Personal life ==
Cota is the son of former professional football player Chad Cota, and the cousin of NFL safety Brady Breeze.
