= Jordon Riley =

American football player (born 1998)

No. 97 – Green Bay Packers
- Position: Defensive tackle
- Roster status: Active

Personal information
- Born: May 19, 1998 (age 28); New Bern, North Carolina, U.S.
- Listed height: 6 ft 5 in (1.96 m)
- Listed weight: 338 lb (153 kg)

Career information
- High school: Riverside (Durham, North Carolina)
- College: North Carolina (2017–2018); Garden City CC (2019); Nebraska (2020–2021); Oregon (2022)
- NFL draft: 2023: 7th round, 243rd overall pick

Career history
- New York Giants (2023–2025); Green Bay Packers (2025–present)

Career NFL statistics as of Week 10, 2026
- Total tackles: 27
- Stats at Pro Football Reference

Jordon Riley (born May 19, 1998) is an American professional football defensive tackle for the Green Bay Packers of the National Football League (NFL). He played college football for the North Carolina Tar Heels, Garden City Broncbusters, Nebraska Cornhuskers, and Oregon Ducks. He was selected by the New York Giants in the seventh round of the 2023 NFL draft and played for them until 2025.

== Early life ==
Riley was born on May 19, 1998, in New Bern, North Carolina, and grew up in Durham. He attended Riverside High School in Durham, being ranked a three-star prospect and the 13th-best player in the state by 247Sports. Riley committed to play college football for the North Carolina Tar Heels over various other offers.

== College career ==
As a true freshman at North Carolina in 2017, Riley appeared in five games and recorded six tackles. The following year, he redshirted. Riley transferred to Garden City Community College in 2019, playing nine games and posting 26 tackles, 3.5 tackles-for-loss and two sacks in his only year there. He transferred again in 2020, this time to the Nebraska Cornhuskers, for which he played six games that year.

In 2021, Riley appeared in 10 games for the Cornhuskers, tallying seven tackles with one tackle-for-loss, and being named to the conference all-academic team. Hoping to receive more playing time, he transferred to the Oregon Ducks for his final season in 2022. With the Ducks, he started all 13 games and made 21 tackles, 1.5 tackles-for-loss, a pass breakup and a half-sack.

== Professional career ==
Pre-draft measurables
Height	Weight	Arm length	Hand span	Wingspan	40-yard dash	10-yard split	20-yard split	20-yard shuttle	Three-cone drill	Vertical jump	Broad jump
6 ft 5 3/8 in (1.97 m)	338 lb (153 kg)	33 3/8 in (0.85 m)	10 in (0.25 m)	6 ft 9 1/4 in (2.06 m)	5.31 s	1.89 s	3.03 s	4.76 s	8.21 s	25.0 in (0.64 m)	8 ft 6 in (2.59 m)
All values from Oregon's Pro Day

=== New York Giants ===
Riley was selected in the seventh round (243rd overall) of the 2023 NFL draft by the New York Giants. As a rookie, he appeared in eight games. He had eight total tackles (four solo).

On August 26, 2025, Riley was waived by the Giants as part of final roster cuts and re-signed to the practice squad the next day.

=== Green Bay Packers ===
On December 3, 2025, Riley was signed by the Green Bay Packers off of the Giants' practice squad. In four appearances for Green Bay, he recorded two combined tackles. In Week 17 against the Baltimore Ravens, Riley departed the contest due to an Achilles injury. He was placed on season-ending injured reserve on December 30.

Riley began the 2026 season on the PUP list while recovering from his Achilles injury. He was activated on October 24.

== Career statistics ==
=== NFL ===
Legend
**Bold**	Career high

==== Regular season ====
Year	Team	Games		Tackles					Fumbles		
Year	Team	GP	GS	Total	Solo	Ast	Sck	TFL	FF	FR	PD
2023	NYG	8	0	8	4	4	0.0	1	0	0	0
2024	NYG	**13**	**5**	**12**	**7**	4	0.0	**3**	0	0	0
2025	GB	4	0	2	2	0	0.0	0	0	0	0
Career		25	5	22	13	9	0.0	4	0	0	0
Source: pro-football-reference.com
