= Jeffrey Bassa =

American football player (born 2002)

No. 31 – Kansas City Chiefs
- Position: Linebacker
- Roster status: Active

Personal information
- Born: September 20, 2002 (age 24)
- Listed height: 6 ft 2 in (1.88 m)
- Listed weight: 235 lb (107 kg)

Career information
- High school: Kearns (Kearns, Utah)
- College: Oregon (2021–2024)
- NFL draft: 2025: 5th round, 156th overall pick

Career history
- Kansas City Chiefs (2025–present)

Awards and highlights
- Second-team All-Pac-12 (2023)

Career NFL statistics as of Week 10, 2026
- Total tackles: 33
- Forced fumbles: 2
- Fumble recoveries: 1
- Stats at Pro Football Reference

Jeffrey Bassa (born September 20, 2002) is an American professional football linebacker for the Kansas City Chiefs of the National Football League (NFL). He played college football for the Oregon Ducks and was selected by the Chiefs in the fifth round of the 2025 NFL draft.

== Early life ==
Bassa grew up in Salt Lake City, Utah and attended Kearns High School, where he lettered in football, basketball and track and field. Coming out of high school, Bassa committed to play college football for the Oregon Ducks over numerous Power 4 offers.

== College career ==
In Bassa's first two seasons in 2021 and 2022, he notched 110 tackles with seven and a half being for a loss, three sacks, a pass deflections, and two interceptions. In the final minutes of Oregon's week 2 matchup, he returned an interception 45 yards for a touchdown in a win over Texas Tech. In the 2024 Fiesta Bowl, Bassa led the Ducks with eight tackles, adding one for a loss, in a win over Liberty, earning game defensive MVP honors. In 2023, he amassed 71 tackles with three and a half being for a loss, a pass deflection, an interception, and a touchdown, earning second-team all-Pac-12 Conference honors.

== Professional career ==
Pre-draft measurables
Height	Weight	Arm length	Hand span	Wingspan	40-yard dash	10-yard split	20-yard split	Three-cone drill	Vertical jump	Broad jump	Bench press
6 ft 1 1/8 in (1.86 m)	232 lb (105 kg)	31 3/8 in (0.80 m)	9 1/4 in (0.23 m)	6 ft 6 3/4 in (2.00 m)	4.63 s	1.59 s	2.73 s	7.34 s	38.5 in (0.98 m)	9 ft 10 in (3.00 m)	21 reps
All values from NFL Combine

Bassa was selected by the Kansas City Chiefs with the 156th overall pick in the fifth round of the 2025 NFL draft.

In Week 4 against the Las Vegas Raiders, Bassa made a crucial play during kickoff duties in the fourth quarter. Up by four points, Bassa created a forced fumble by "peanut-punching" the ball on Raiders kick returner Dareke Young and recovered by Bassa's teammate, Jack Cochrane. The next play, the Chiefs would score on a Kenneth Walker III touchdown as the Chiefs held on to win by the end of the game, 30–27.
