= 2023 Alabama Crimson Tide football team =

American college football season

2023 Alabama Crimson Tide football

SEC champion SEC Western Division champion

SEC Championship Game, W 27–24 vs. Georgia

Rose Bowl (CFP Semifinal), L 20–27 ^{OT} vs. Michigan
- Conference: Southeastern Conference
- Western Division

Ranking
- Coaches: No. 5
- AP: No. 5
- Record: 12–2 (8–0 SEC)
- Head coach: Nick Saban (17th season)
- Offensive coordinator: Tommy Rees (1st season)
- Offensive scheme: Play Action/Read
- Defensive coordinator: Kevin Steele (2nd season)
- Base defense: 3–4
- Home stadium: Bryant–Denny Stadium

2023 Southeastern Conference football standings
	Conf.			Overall
Team	W		L	W		L
Eastern Division
No. 4 Georgia xy	8	–	0	13	–	1
No. 8 Missouri	6	–	2	11	–	2
No. 17 Tennessee	4	–	4	9	–	4
Kentucky	3	–	5	7	–	6
Florida	3	–	5	5	–	7
South Carolina	3	–	5	5	–	7
Vanderbilt	0	–	8	2	–	10
Western Division
No. 5 Alabama xy$^	8	–	0	12	–	2
No. 9 Ole Miss	6	–	2	11	–	2
No. 12 LSU	6	–	2	10	–	3
Texas A&M	4	–	4	7	–	6
Auburn	3	–	5	6	–	7
Mississippi State	1	–	7	5	–	7
Arkansas	1	–	7	4	–	8
Championship: Alabama 27, Georgia 24
^ – College Football Playoff participant; $ – Conference champion; x – Division champion/co-champions; y – Championship game participant; Rankings from AP Poll

The 2023 Alabama Crimson Tide football team (variously "Alabama", "Bama", or "The Tide") represented the University of Alabama in the 2023 NCAA Division I FBS football season. The season marked the Crimson Tide's 129th overall season, 90th as a member of the Southeastern Conference (SEC), and 32nd and final season within the SEC Western Division, with Texas and Oklahoma joining the SEC on July 1, 2024. They played their home games at Bryant–Denny Stadium in Tuscaloosa, Alabama, and were led by Nick Saban in his 17th and final season as head coach.

Looking to build on the successes of the 2022 campaign, Alabama entered the 2023 season after winning the Sugar Bowl over Kansas State, and were the favorite to win the Western Division and meet the Georgia Bulldogs in the 2023 SEC Championship Game. They were No. 4 in the pre-season polls, but a loss to Texas and a narrow win against South Florida dropped them to No. 13 in the rankings. Alabama would recover and close out the regular season by winning its next 9 games, alongside a narrow win against Auburn in the Iron Bowl, to finish with an 11–1 record (8–0 in SEC play) and meet the Bulldogs for the SEC Championship in a rematch of the 2021 contest. Alabama was victorious by a final score of 27–24 to capture their 11th SEC championship title, ending Georgia's 29-game winning streak that started after a 2021 loss, also to Alabama. The following day, final College Football Playoff (CFP) standings were unveiled. Alabama, alongside the Big 12 Conference champions Texas, were selected ahead of Florida State for the College Football Playoff. No. 4 Alabama was defeated by the eventual national champion, No. 1 Michigan, in the 2024 Rose Bowl in overtime, 27–20.

This season marked the first time since 2007 that Alabama was not ranked #1 in any week in the AP Poll following the release of the final season rankings on January 9, 2024. The following day, on January 10, Nick Saban announced that he would be retiring as the Crimson Tide's head coach.

== Offseason ==
Positions key
Offense	Defense	Special teams
QB — Quarterback; RB — Running back; FB — Fullback; WR — Wide receiver; TE — Tight end; OL — Offensive lineman; T — Tackle; G — Guard; C — Center	DL — Defensive lineman; DT — Defensive tackle (Note: Includes nose tackle (NT)); DE — Defensive end; EDGE — Edge rusher; LB — Linebacker (Note: Includes middle linebacker (MLB/MIKE), weakside linebacker (WILL), strongside linebacker (SAM), off-ball linebacker, and outside linebacker (OLB)); DB — Defensive back; CB — Cornerback; S — Safety (Note: Includes free safety (FS) and strong safety (SS))	K — Kicker (Note: Also known as a placekicker (PK)); P — Punter; LS — Long snapper; RS — Return specialist (Note: Includes kickoff and punt returners)

=== Team departures ===
Over the course of the off-season, Alabama lost 45 total players. 15 players graduated, 12 declared for the 2023 NFL draft, while the other 18 entered the transfer portal.

2023 Alabama offseason departures
Name	Number	Pos.	Height/Weight	Hometown	Year	Reason
Jahmyr Gibbs	#1	RB	5'11, 200	Dalton, GA	Junior	Declared for 2023 NFL draft
DeMarcco Hellams	#2	S	6’1, 208	Washington, DC	Senior	Graduated/Declared for 2023 NFL draft
Khyree Jackson	#6	CB	6’3, 198	Upper Marlboro, MD	Junior	Elected to transfer to Oregon
Trey Sanders	#6	RB	6’0, 214	Port Saint Joe, FL	(redshirt) Junior	Elected to transfer to TCU
Jordan Battle	#9	SS	6’1, 206	Fort Lauderdale, FL	Senior	Graduated/Declared for 2023 NFL draft
Eli Ricks	#7	CB	6’2, 190	Rancho Cucamonga, CA	Junior	Declared for 2023 NFL draft
Tyler Harrell	#8	WR	6'0, 197	Miami, FL	(redshirt) Junior	Elected to transfer to Miami
Bryce Young	#9	QB	6’0, 194	Philadelphia, PA	Junior	Declared for 2023 NFL draft
Henry To'oTo'o	#10	MLB	5’10, 175	Sacramento, CA	Senior	Graduated/Declared for 2023 NFL draft
JoJo Earle	#10	WR	5'10, 177	Aledo, TX	Sophomore	Elected to transfer to TCU
Traeshon Holden	#11	WR	6’1, 190	Hollywood, FL	(redshirt) Junior	Elected to transfer to Oregon
Christian Leary	#12	WR	5’10, 175	Orlando, FL	Sophomore	Elected to transfer to Georgia Tech
Aaron Anderson	#13	WR	5'9, 184	New Orleans, LA	Freshman	Elected to transfer to LSU
Brian Branch	#14	S	6’1, 193	Fayetteville, GA	Junior	Declared for 2023 NFL draft
Trequon Fegans	#22	DB	6'2, 185	Alabaster, AL	(redshirt) Freshman	Elected to transfer to USC
Jahquez Robinson	#23	DB	6'2, 199	Jacksonville, FL	(redshirt) Junior	Elected to transfer to Colorado
Rodney Johnson	#27	CB	5'11, 160	Gadsden, AL	Freshman	TBD
Elijah Crockett	#29	RB	5'11, 210	Chino Hills, CA	Sophomore	TBD
Jacoby Boykins	#30	WR	5'11, 182	Houston, TX	Sophomore	Elected to transfer to Abilene Christian
Will Anderson Jr.	#31	LB	6’4, 243	Hampton, GA	Junior	Declared for 2023 NFL draft
Bret Bolin	#36	WR	6'0, 176	Lemont, IL	(redshirt) Senior	Complete college eligibility
Demouy Kennedy	#37	LB	6'3, 220	Theodore, AL	Junior	Elected to transfer to Colorado
Jaylen Moody	#42	LB	6'2, 225	Conway, SC	(redshirt) Senior	Completed college eligibility
Byron Young	#47	DL	6’3, 292	Laurel, MS	Senior	Graduated/Declared for 2023 NFL draft
Gabe Pugh	#50	LS	6'5, 273	Tuscaloosa, AL	Junior	Elected to transfer to Louisiana Tech
Tanner Bowles	#51	OL	6'5, 293	Glasgow, KY	(redshirt) Junior	Elected to transfer to Kentucky
Tyler Steen	#54	G	6’5, 315	Miami, FL	(redshirt) Grad Student	Complete college eligibility
Emil Ekiyor Jr.	#55	OL	6’3, 307	Indianapolis, IN	(redshirt) Senior	Graduated/Declared for 2023 NFL draft
Tommy Brockermeyer	#58	OL	6'5, 292	Fort Worth, TX	(redshirt) Freshman	Elected to transfer to TCU
Kendall Randolph	#60	OL	6’4, 298	Madison, AL	(redshirt) Grad Student	Completed college eligibility
Jackson Roby	#62	OL	6’5, 285	Huntsville, AL	(redshirt) Senior	Completed college eligibility
Javion Cohen	#70	OL	6'4, 305	Phenix City, AL	Junior	Elected to transfer to Miami
Damieon George	#74	OL	6’6, 333	Houston, TX	Junior	Elected to transfer to Florida
Amari Kight	#78	DL	6'7, 322	Alabaster, AL	(redshirt) Junior	Elected to transfer to UCF
Cameron Latu	#81	TE	6'5, 244	Salt Lake City, UT	(redshirt) Senior	Graduated/Declared for 2023 NFL draft
Elijah Brown	#85	TE	6'5, 230	Dayton, OH	Freshman	Elected to transfer to Florida Atlantic
Grant Krieger	#89	WR	6’2, 192	Pittsburgh, PA	Senior	Complete college eligibility
D. J. Dale	#94	DT	6'3, 300	Birmingham, AL	Senior	Graduated/2023 NFL draft
Jack Martin	#95	P/K	6'2, 207	Dothan, AL	(redshirt) Junior	Elected to transfer to Houston
Braylen Ingraham	#97	DL	6'4, 298	Fort Lauderdale, FL	(redshirt) Sophomore	Elected to transfer to Syracuse

=== Transfer portal ===
==== Outgoing transfers ====
21 Alabama players elected to enter the NCAA Transfer Portal during or after the 2022 season.

Name	No.	Pos.	Height/Weight	Hometown	Year	College transferred to	Sources
Khyree Jackson	#6	CB	6’3, 198	Upper Marlboro, MD	Junior	Oregon	
Trey Sanders	#6	RB	6’0, 214	Port Saint Joe, FL	(redshirt) Junior	TCU	
Tyler Harrell	#8	WR	6'0, 197	Miami, FL	(redshirt) Junior	Miami	
JoJo Earle	#10	WR	5'10, 177	Aledo, TX	Sophomore	TCU	
Traeshon Holden	#11	WR	6’1, 190	Hollywood, FL	(redshirt) Junior	Oregon	
Christian Leary	#12	WR	5’10, 175	Orlando, FL	Sophomore	Georgia Tech	
Aaron Anderson	#13	WR	5'9, 184	New Orleans, LA	Freshman	LSU	
Trequon Fegans	#22	DB	6'2, 185	Alabaster, AL	(redshirt) Freshman	USC	
Jahquez Robinson	#23	DB	6'2, 199	Jacksonville, FL	(redshirt) Junior	Colorado	
Rodney Johnson	#27	CB	5'11, 160	Gadsden, AL	Freshman	TBD	
Elijah Crockett	#29	RB	5'11, 210	Chino Hills, CA	Sophomore	TBD	---
Jacoby Boykins	#30	WR	5'11, 182	Houston, TX	Sophomore	Abilene Christian	
Demouy Kennedy	#37	LB	6'3, 220	Theodore, AL	Junior	Colorado	
Gabe Pugh	#50	LS	6'5, 273	Tuscaloosa, AL	Junior	Louisiana Tech	
Tanner Bowles	#51	OL	6'5, 293	Glasgow, KY	(redshirt) Junior	Kentucky	
Tommy Brockermeyer	#58	OT	6'5, 292	Fort Worth, TX	(redshirt) Freshman	TCU	
Javion Cohen	#70	OL	6'4, 305	Phenix City, AL	Junior	Miami	
Damieon George	#74	OL	6’6, 333	Houston, TX	Junior	Florida	
Amari Kight	#78	DL	6'7, 322	Alabaster, AL	(redshirt) Junior	UCF	
Elijah Brown	#85	TE	6'5, 230	Dayton, OH	Freshman	Florida Atlantic	
Jack Martin	#95	P/K	6'2, 207	Dothan, AL	(redshirt) Junior	Houston	
Braylen Ingraham	#97	DL	6'4, 298	Fort Lauderdale, FL	(redshirt) Sophomore	Syracuse	
Jamil Burroughs	#98	DL	6'3, 309	Power Springs, GA	(redshirt) Junior	TBD	

Note: Players with a dash in the new school column didn't land on a new team for the 2023 season.

==== Incoming transfers ====
Over the off-season, Alabama added six players from the transfer portal. According to 247 Sports, Alabama had the No. 60 ranked transfer class in the country.

Name	No.	Pos.	Height/Weight	Year	Hometown	Pre. school	Sources
Jaylen Key	#1	DB	6'2, 210	(redshirt) Junior	Tallahassee, FL	UAB	
Tyler Buchner	#12	QB	6'1, 215	Junior	San Diego, CA	Notre Dame	
Trezmen Marshall	#15	LB	6'1, 230	Junior	Homerville, GA	Georgia	
CJ Dippre	#18	TE	6'5, 260	Sophomore	Scranton, PA	Maryland	
Trey Amos	#21	CB	6'1, 197	Sophomore	New Iberia, LA	Louisiana	
Colby McNeal	#59	TE	6'5, 250	(redshirt) Sophomore	Dothan, AL	Colorado State	

=== Returning starters ===
Offense
Player	Class	Position
Jase McClellan	Senior	Running Back
Jermaine Burton	Senior	Wide receiver
Seth McLaughlin	Senior	Offensive Line

Defense
Player	Class	Position
Dallas Turner	Junior	Linebacker
Kool-Aid McKinstry	Junior	Cornerback
Jaheim Oatis	Sophomore	Defensive line
Malachi Moore	Senior	Defensive Back

Special teams
Player	Class	Position
Will Reichard	Grad Student	Kicker
James Burnip	Sophomore	Punter

* Bowl game not played. ^ Waiting decision for 2023 season. † Indicates player was a starter in 2021 but missed all of 2022 due to injury.

=== Recruiting class ===
Alabama signed 29 players in the class of 2023. The Crimson Tide' recruiting class ranks No. 1 in the 247Sports and Rivals rankings. 23 signees were ranked in the ESPN 300 top prospect list. Alabama also signed walk-ons during national signing period.

College recruiting
Name	Hometown	School	Height	Weight	Commit date
Jaquavious Russaw; LB	Montgomery, AL	Carver High School	6 ft 3 in (1.91 m)	220 lb (100 kg)	Dec 21, 2022
Jaquavious Russaw; LB	Recruit ratings: Rivals: 247Sports: On3: ESPN: (91)				
Kadyn Proctor; OL	Runnells, IA	Southeast Polk High School	6 ft 6 in (1.98 m)	315 lb (143 kg)	Dec 20, 2022
Kadyn Proctor; OL	Recruit ratings: Rivals: 247Sports: On3: ESPN: (90)				
James Smith; DT	Montgomery, AL	Carver High School	6 ft 3 in (1.91 m)	300 lb (140 kg)	Dec 21, 2022
James Smith; DT	Recruit ratings: Rivals: 247Sports: On3: ESPN: (90)				
Caleb Downs; S	Hoschton, GA	Mill Creek High School	6 ft 0 in (1.83 m)	190 lb (86 kg)	Jul 27, 2022
Caleb Downs; S	Recruit ratings: Rivals: 247Sports: On3: ESPN: (90)				
Desmond Ricks; CB	Chesapeake, VA	IMG Academy (FL)	6 ft 2 in (1.88 m)	185 lb (84 kg)	Dec 22, 2022
Desmond Ricks; CB	Recruit ratings: Rivals: 247Sports: On3: ESPN: (90)				
Richard Young; RB	Lehigh Acres, FL	Lehigh Senior High School	5 ft 11 in (1.80 m)	195 lb (88 kg)	Jul 29, 2022
Richard Young; RB	Recruit ratings: Rivals: 247Sports: On3: ESPN: (89)				
Keon Keeley; DE	Tampa, FL	Berkeley Prep	6 ft 5 in (1.96 m)	245 lb (111 kg)	Dec 12, 2022
Keon Keeley; DE	Recruit ratings: Rivals: 247Sports: On3: ESPN: (89)				
Justice Haynes; RB	Buford, GA	Buford High School	6 ft 2 in (1.88 m)	170 lb (77 kg)	Jul 17, 2022
Justice Haynes; RB	Recruit ratings: Rivals: 247Sports: On3: ESPN: (88)				
Eli Holstein; QB	Zachary, LA	Zachary High School	6 ft 4 in (1.93 m)	225 lb (102 kg)	May 24, 2022
Eli Holstein; QB	Recruit ratings: Rivals: 247Sports: On3: ESPN: (88)				
Tony Mitchell; CB	Alabaster, AL	Thompson High School	6 ft 2 in (1.88 m)	190 lb (86 kg)	Jun 26, 2022
Tony Mitchell; CB	Recruit ratings: Rivals: 247Sports: On3: ESPN: (87)				
Dylan Lonergan; QB	Snellville, GA	Brookwood High School	6 ft 2 in (1.88 m)	210 lb (95 kg)	Jul 11, 2022
Dylan Lonergan; QB	Recruit ratings: Rivals: 247Sports: On3: ESPN: (87)				
Jahlili Hurley; CB	Florence, AL	Florence High School	6 ft 2 in (1.88 m)	170 lb (77 kg)	Feb 22, 2022
Jahlili Hurley; CB	Recruit ratings: Rivals: 247Sports: On3: ESPN: (87)				
Jalen Hale; WR	Longview, TX	Longview High School	6 ft 2 in (1.88 m)	185 lb (84 kg)	Sep 21, 2022
Jalen Hale; WR	Recruit ratings: Rivals: 247Sports: On3: ESPN: (86)				
Jordan Renaud; DT	Tyler, TX	Tyler Legacy High School	6 ft 4 in (1.93 m)	245 lb (111 kg)	Sep 19, 2022
Jordan Renaud; DT	Recruit ratings: Rivals: 247Sports: On3: ESPN: (86)				
Wilkin Formby; OT	Tuscaloosa, AL	Northridge High School	6 ft 7 in (2.01 m)	300 lb (140 kg)	Jun 20, 2022
Wilkin Formby; OT	Recruit ratings: Rivals: 247Sports: On3: ESPN: (84)				
Olaus Alinen; OT	Pori, Finland	Loomis Chaffee School (CT)	6 ft 6 in (1.98 m)	310 lb (140 kg)	Jul 22, 2022
Olaus Alinen; OT	Recruit ratings: Rivals: 247Sports: On3: ESPN: (84)				
Malik Benson; WR	Lansing, KS	Hutchinson Community College (JC)	6 ft 1 in (1.85 m)	185 lb (84 kg)	Jul 5, 2022
Malik Benson; WR	Recruit ratings: Rivals: 247Sports: On3: ESPN: (83)				
Miles McVay; OT	East St. Louis, IL	East St. Louis High School	6 ft 7 in (2.01 m)	355 lb (161 kg)	Aug 11, 2022
Miles McVay; OT	Recruit ratings: Rivals: 247Sports: On3: ESPN: (83)				
Ty Lockwood; TE	Thompson's Station, TN	Independence High School	6 ft 5 in (1.96 m)	225 lb (102 kg)	Aug 2, 2022
Ty Lockwood; TE	Recruit ratings: Rivals: 247Sports: On3: ESPN: (83)				
Hunter Osborne; DE	Trussville, AL	Hewitt-Trussville High School	6 ft 4 in (1.93 m)	255 lb (116 kg)	Aug 1, 2022
Hunter Osborne; DE	Recruit ratings: Rivals: 247Sports: On3: ESPN: (82)				
Yhonzae Pierre; DE	Eufaula, AL	Eufaula High School	6 ft 3 in (1.91 m)	220 lb (100 kg)	Apr 14, 2022
Yhonzae Pierre; DE	Recruit ratings: Rivals: 247Sports: On3: ESPN: (82)				
Cole Adams; WR	Owasso, OK	Owasso High School	5 ft 10 in (1.78 m)	190 lb (86 kg)	Jun 29, 2022
Cole Adams; WR	Recruit ratings: Rivals: 247Sports: On3: ESPN: (81)				
Brayson Hubbard; ATH	Ocean Springs, MS	Ocean Springs High School	6 ft 2 in (1.88 m)	190 lb (86 kg)	Jun 26, 2022
Brayson Hubbard; ATH	Recruit ratings: Rivals: 247Sports: On3: ESPN: (80)				
Edric Hill; DT	North Kansas City, MO	North Kansas City High School	6 ft 3 in (1.91 m)	285 lb (129 kg)	Aug 22, 2022
Edric Hill; DT	Recruit ratings: Rivals: 247Sports: On3: ESPN: (80)				
RyQueze McElderry; OL	Anniston, AL	Anniston High School	6 ft 3 in (1.91 m)	340 lb (150 kg)	Jul 4, 2022
RyQueze McElderry; OL	Recruit ratings: Rivals: 247Sports: On3: ESPN: (79)				
Jaren Hamilton; WR	Gainesville, FL	Buchholz High School	6 ft 1 in (1.85 m)	190 lb (86 kg)	Nov 28, 2022
Jaren Hamilton; WR	Recruit ratings: Rivals: 247Sports: On3: ESPN: (79)				
Justin Jefferson; LB	Memphis, TN	Pearl River Community College (JC)	6 ft 2 in (1.88 m)	215 lb (98 kg)	Jun 28, 2022
Justin Jefferson; LB	Recruit ratings: Rivals: 247Sports: On3: ESPN: (79)				
Conor Talty; PK	Chicago, IL	St. Rita of Cascia High School	6 ft 2 in (1.88 m)	170 lb (77 kg)	Jul 20, 2022
Conor Talty; PK	Recruit ratings: Rivals: 247Sports: On3: ESPN: (75)				
Overall recruit ranking: Rivals: 1 247Sports: 1 On3: 1 ESPN: 1
‡ Refers to 40-yard dash; Note: In many cases, Scout, Rivals, 247Sports, On3, and ESPN may conflict in their listings of height, weight and 40 time.; In these cases, the average was taken. ESPN grades are on a 100-point scale.; Sources: "Rivals commits". Rivals.; "ESPN commits". ESPN.; "2023 Team Ranking". Rivals.com.; "247Sports commits". 247Sports.

2023 Overall class rankings

Website	National rank	Conference rank	5 star recruits	4 star recruits	3 star recruits
ESPN	#1	#1	5	19	4
On3 Recruits	#1	#1	9	19	2
Rivals	#1	#1	4	20	1
247 Sports	#1	#1	7	20	1

=== Entered NFL draft ===
Player	Position
Bryce Young	QB
Will Anderson Jr.	LB
Jahmyr Gibbs	RB
Brian Branch	S

=== Walk-ons ===
Name	Pos.	Height/Weight	Hometown	High school
Sawyer Deerman	ATH	5'10, 175	Northport, AL	Tuscaloosa County High School
Braylon Chatman	LB	6'0, 215	Trussville, AL	Hewitt-Trussville High School
JR Gardner	ATH	6'3, 280	Gulf Shores, AL	Gulf Shores High School
Reed Harradine	P	6'3, 185	Birmingham, AL	Mountain Brook High School
Brock O'Quinn	LS	6'1, 210	Southlake, TX	Southlake Carroll High School
Kolby Peavy	ATH	6'1, 180	Excel, AL	Excel High School
Billy Roby	OL	5'11, 245	Huntsville, AL	Huntsville High School
Antonio Ross	WR	6'2, 180	Alexandria, AL	Alexandria High School
Joey Temen	WR	5'11, 165	Davenport, FL	Ridge Community High School

=== 2024 Recruiting class ===
College recruiting
Name	Hometown	School	Height	Weight	Commit date
Jaylen Mbakwe; Cornerback	Pinson, AL	Clay-Chalkville High School	6 ft 0 in (1.83 m)	175 lb (79 kg)	Jul 26, 2022
Jaylen Mbakwe; Cornerback	Recruit ratings: Rivals: 247Sports: On3: ESPN: (92)				
Ryan Coleman-Williams*; Wide receiver	Saraland, AL	Saraland High School	6 ft 1 in (1.85 m)	175 lb (79 kg)	Jan 24, 2024
Ryan Coleman-Williams*; Wide receiver	Recruit ratings: Rivals: 247Sports: On3: ESPN: (92)				
Zay Mincey; Safety	Daytona Beach, FL	Mainland High School	6 ft 3 in (1.91 m)	180 lb (82 kg)	Jan 6, 2024
Zay Mincey; Safety	Recruit ratings: Rivals: 247Sports: On3: ESPN: (86)				
Caleb Odom; Tight end	Carrollton, GA	Carrollton High School	6 ft 5 in (1.96 m)	215 lb (98 kg)	Jul 15, 2023
Caleb Odom; Tight end	Recruit ratings: Rivals: 247Sports: On3: ESPN: (84)				
Zabien Brown; Cornerback	Santa Ana, CA	Mater Dei High School	6 ft 0 in (1.83 m)	180 lb (82 kg)	Jul 9, 2023
Zabien Brown; Cornerback	Recruit ratings: Rivals: 247Sports: On3: ESPN: (84)				
Kevin Riley; Running back	Northport, AL	Tuscaloosa County High School	5 ft 11 in (1.80 m)	200 lb (91 kg)	Dec 20, 2023
Kevin Riley; Running back	Recruit ratings: Rivals: 247Sports: ESPN: (84)				
Casey Poe; Offensive guard	Lindale, TX	Lindale High School	6 ft 5 in (1.96 m)	285 lb (129 kg)	Jul 12, 2023
Casey Poe; Offensive guard	Recruit ratings: Rivals: 247Sports: On3: ESPN: (84)				
Jeremiah Beaman; Defensive tackle	Birmingham, AL	A. H. Parker High School	6 ft 4 in (1.93 m)	255 lb (116 kg)	May 21, 2023
Jeremiah Beaman; Defensive tackle	Recruit ratings: Rivals: 247Sports: On3: ESPN: (83)				
Cayden Jones; Linebacker	Arden, NC	Christ School	6 ft 4 in (1.93 m)	215 lb (98 kg)	Jul 20, 2022
Cayden Jones; Linebacker	Recruit ratings: Rivals: 247Sports: On3: ESPN: (83)				
Daniel Hill; Running back	Meridian, MS	Meridian High School	6 ft 1 in (1.85 m)	220 lb (100 kg)	Jan 6, 2024
Daniel Hill; Running back	Recruit ratings: Rivals: 247Sports: On3: ESPN: (83)				
Peyton Woodyard; Safety	Bellflower, CA	St. John Bosco High School	6 ft 2 in (1.88 m)	190 lb (86 kg)	Aug 8, 2023
Peyton Woodyard; Safety	Recruit ratings: Rivals: 247Sports: On3: ESPN: (83)				
Noah Carter; Defensive end	Peoria, AZ	Centennial High School	6 ft 3 in (1.91 m)	225 lb (102 kg)	Jan 25, 2024
Noah Carter; Defensive end	Recruit ratings: Rivals: 247Sports: On3: ESPN: (83)				
Aeryn Hampton; Defensive back	Daingerfield, TX	Daingerfield High School	5 ft 10 in (1.78 m)	175 lb (79 kg)	Dec 20, 2023
Aeryn Hampton; Defensive back	Recruit ratings: Rivals: 247Sports: ESPN: (82)				
Amari Jefferson; Wide receiver	Chattanooga, TN	Baylor School	6 ft 1 in (1.85 m)	190 lb (86 kg)	Aug 5, 2023
Amari Jefferson; Wide receiver	Recruit ratings: Rivals: 247Sports: On3: ESPN: (81)				
Sterling Dixon; Defensive end	Mobile, AL	Mobile Christian High School	6 ft 4 in (1.93 m)	215 lb (98 kg)	Dec 1, 2022
Sterling Dixon; Defensive end	Recruit ratings: Rivals: 247Sports: On3: ESPN: (81)				
Steve Bolo Mboumoua; Defensive end	Saint-Augustin-de-Desmaures, Quebec, CN	Campus Notre-Dame-de-Foy	6 ft 4 in (1.93 m)	260 lb (120 kg)	Dec 20, 2023
Steve Bolo Mboumoua; Defensive end	Recruit ratings: Rivals: 247Sports: ESPN: (81)				
Rico Scott; Wide receiver	Harrisburg, PA	Bishop McDevitt High School	6 ft 0 in (1.83 m)	190 lb (86 kg)	Apr 16, 2023
Rico Scott; Wide receiver	Recruit ratings: Rivals: 247Sports: On3: ESPN: (81)				
Jayshawn Ross; Outside linebacker	Kansas City, MO	Liberty North High School	6 ft 3 in (1.91 m)	220 lb (100 kg)	Dec 18, 2023
Jayshawn Ross; Outside linebacker	Recruit ratings: Rivals: 247Sports: On3: ESPN: (81)				
Isaiah Faga; Defensive tackle	Phenix City, AL	Central High School	6 ft 3 in (1.91 m)	275 lb (125 kg)	Jun 28, 2023
Isaiah Faga; Defensive tackle	Recruit ratings: Rivals: 247Sports: On3: ESPN: (79)				
Justin Okoronkwo; Linebacker	Nürnberg, GER	Nürnberg Rams	6 ft 3 in (1.91 m)	215 lb (98 kg)	Jul 9, 2023
Justin Okoronkwo; Linebacker	Recruit ratings: Rivals: 247Sports: On3: ESPN: (79)				
William Sanders; Offensive guard	Brookwood, AL	Brookwood High School	6 ft 3 in (1.91 m)	295 lb (134 kg)	Jul 21, 2023
William Sanders; Offensive guard	Recruit ratings: Rivals: 247Sports: On3: ESPN: (78)				
Rydarrius Morgan; Safety	Phenix City, AL	Central High School	5 ft 11 in (1.80 m)	180 lb (82 kg)	Aug 9, 2023
Rydarrius Morgan; Safety	Recruit ratings: Rivals: 247Sports: On3: ESPN: (78)				
Jay Lindsey; Tight end	Butler, AL	Patrician Academy	6 ft 5 in (1.96 m)	235 lb (107 kg)	Aug 29, 2023
Jay Lindsey; Tight end	Recruit ratings: Rivals: 247Sports: On3: ESPN: (78)				
Dre Kirkpatrick Jr; Safety	Gadsden, AL	Gadsden City High School	5 ft 11 in (1.80 m)	190 lb (86 kg)	Aug 18, 2023
Dre Kirkpatrick Jr; Safety	Recruit ratings: Rivals: 247Sports: On3: ESPN: (77)				
Joseph Ionata; Offensive guard	Clearwater, FL	Calvary Christian High School	6 ft 4 in (1.93 m)	280 lb (130 kg)	Jun 3, 2023
Joseph Ionata; Offensive guard	Recruit ratings: Rivals: 247Sports: On3: ESPN: (77)				
Quinton Reese; Inside linebacker	Birmingham, AL	Ramsay High School	6 ft 4 in (1.93 m)	280 lb (130 kg)	Sep 16, 2023
Quinton Reese; Inside linebacker	Recruit ratings: Rivals: 247Sports: On3: ESPN: (76)				
Julian Sayin Δ Quarterback	Carlsbad, CA	Carlsbad High School	6 ft 2 in (1.88 m)	190 lb (86 kg)	Nov 2, 2022
Julian Sayin Δ Quarterback	Recruit ratings: Rivals: 247Sports: On3: ESPN: (91)				
Jameer Grimsley Δ Cornerback	Tampa, FL	Tampa Catholic High School	6 ft 3 in (1.91 m)	185 lb (84 kg)	Jul 1, 2023
Jameer Grimsley Δ Cornerback	Recruit ratings: Rivals: 247Sports: On3: ESPN: (81)				
Overall recruit ranking:
‡ Refers to 40-yard dash; Note: In many cases, Scout, Rivals, 247Sports, On3, and ESPN may conflict in their listings of height, weight and 40 time.; In these cases, the average was taken. ESPN grades are on a 100-point scale.; Sources: "Rivals commits". Rivals.; "ESPN commits". ESPN.; "2024 Team Ranking". Rivals.com.; "247Sports commits". 247Sports.

*Originally class of 2025, but reclassified to 2024.

*= 247Sports Composite rating; ratings are out of 1.00. (five stars= 1.00–.98, four stars= .97–.90, three stars= .80–.89)
†= Despite being rated as a four and five star recruit by ESPN, On3.com, Rivals.com and 247Sports.com, Sayin received a five star 247Sports Composite rating.
Δ= Left the Alabama program following signing but prior to the 2024 season.

2024 Overall class rankings

Website	National rank	Conference rank	5 star recruits	4 star recruits	3 star recruits	Total
ESPN	–	–	2	16	8	32
On3 Recruits	#2	#2	4	18	6	28
Rivals	#2	#2	4	17	7	28
247 Sports	#3	#2	4	24	6	34

== Preseason ==
=== Spring game ===
The Crimson Tide are scheduled to hold spring practices in March and April 2023 with the Alabama football spring game, "A-Day" to take place in Tuscaloosa, Alabama, on April 22, 2023, with the Crimson team beating the White team 30–21.

2023 A-Day Spring Game

Quarter	1	2	3	4	Total
BAMA White	7	0	7	7	21
BAMA Crimson	0	17	3	10	30

at Bryant Denny Stadium, Tuscaloosa, AL

- Date: April 22, 2023
- Game time: 2:00 pm CDT
- Game weather: Sunny, 73 °F (23 °C)
- Game attendance: 58,710
- TV: SECN

=== Award watch lists ===
Listed in the order that they were released

Award	Player	Position	Year	Source
Lott Trophy	Kool-Aid McKinstry	DB	Jr.	
Lott Trophy	Malachi Moore	DB	Sr.	
Dodd Trophy	Nick Saban	HC	–	
Maxwell Award	Jase McClellan	RB	Sr.	
Patrick Mannelly Award	Kneeland Hibbett	LS	Jr.	
Bronko Nagurski Trophy	Kool-Aid McKinstry	DB	Jr.	
Bronko Nagurski Trophy	Malachi Moore	DB	Sr.	
Bronko Nagurski Trophy	Dallas Turner	LB	Jr.	
Outland Trophy	Tyler Booker	OL	So.	
Outland Trophy	JC Latham	OL	Jr.	
Outland Trophy	Jaheim Oatis	DL	So.	
Lou Groza Award	Will Reichard	K	Gr.	
John Mackey Award	CJ Dippre	TE	Jr.	
Rimington Trophy	Seth McLaughlin	OL	Sr.	
Wuerffel Trophy	Malachi Moore	DB	Sr.	
Butkus Award	Deontae Lawson	LB	RS So.	
Jim Thorpe Award	Kool-Aid McKinstry	DB	Jr.	
Walter Camp Award	Kool-Aid McKinstry	DB	Jr.	
Bednarik Award	Kool-Aid McKinstry	DB	Jr.	
Bednarik Award	Dallas Turner	LB	Jr.	
Rotary Lombardi Award	Dallas Turner	LB	Jr.	
Rotary Lombardi Award	JC Latham	OL	Jr.	
Earl Campbell Tyler Rose Award	Jase McClellan	RB	Sr.	

=== SEC media days ===
The 2023 SEC Media days were held on July 17–20, 2023 at Grand Hyatt in Nashville, TN. The Preseason Polls were released July 2023. Each team had their head coach available to talk to the media at the event on July 19, 2023, with Nick Saban (HC), JC Latham, (OL), Kool-Aid McKinstry, (DB) and Dallas Turner, (LB). Coverage of the event was televised on SEC Network and ESPN.

Media poll (West Division)
Predicted finish	Team	Votes (1st place)
1	Alabama	(165) 1899
2	LSU	(117) 1838
3	Texas A&M	(1) 1144
4	Ole Miss	1128
5	Arkansas	(3) 958
6	Auburn	(4) 685
7	Mississippi State	(1) 496

Media poll (SEC Championship)
Rank	Team	Votes
1	Georgia	181
2	Alabama	62
3	LSU	31

=== Preseason All-SEC teams and All-American honors ===
==== Media ====
First Team

Position	Player	Class
Offense
OL	JC Latham	Junior
Defense
LB	Dallas Turner	Junior
DB	Kool-Aid McKinstry	Junior
Special teams
PK	Will Reichard	GS
LS	Kneeland Hibbett	Junior
RS	Kool-Aid McKinstry	Junior

Second Team

Position	Player	Class
Offense
RB	Jase McClellan	Senior
WR	Ja'Corey Brooks	Junior
OL	Tyler Booker	GS
C	Seth McLaughlin	RS Junior
Defense
DB	Malachi Moore	Senior
DL	Jaheim Oatis	Sophomore
DL	Justin Eboigbe	GS

Third Team

Position	Player	Class
Offense
WR	Jermaine Burton	Senior
Defense
DL	Tim Smith	Senior
LB	Chris Braswell	Senior

==== Coaches ====
First Team

Position	Player	Class
Offense
OL	JC Latham	Junior
Defense
LB	Dallas Turner	Junior
DB	Kool-Aid McKinstry	Junior
Special teams
PK	Will Reichard	GS
RS	Kool-Aid McKinstry	Junior

Second Team

Position	Player	Class
Offense
RB	Jase McClellan	Senior
WR	Jermaine Burton	Senior
OL	Tyler Booker	GS
C	Seth McLaughlin	RS Junior
Defense
DB	Malachi Moore	Senior
DL	Jaheim Oatis	Sophomore
DL	Justin Eboigbe	GS
Special teams
LS	Kneeland Hibbett	Junior

Third Team

Position	Player	Class
Offense
WR	Ja'Corey Brooks	Junior
Defense
DL	Tim Smith	Senior
LB	Chris Braswell	Senior

Pre-season All-American Honors
Player	Position	AP	CBS Sports	ESPN	PFF	SI	SN	WCFF	Designation
Dallas Turner	LB			1st		1st			Unanimous
JC Latham	OL		1st					1st	Unanimous
Kool-Aid McKinstry	DB	1st	1st	1st	1st	1st	1st	1st	Unanimous
Tyler Booker	OL			1st					Unanimous

Other All-Americans teams
Player	Position	Class	Selector(s)
Jase McClellan	RB	Sr.	Athlon Sports (2nd)
Tyler Booker	OL	So.	Athlon Sports (2nd)
Seth McLaughlin	OL	Sr.	Athlon Sports (2nd)
JC Latham	OL	Jr.	AP (2nd)
Dallas Turner	LB	Jr.	Athlon Sports (2nd); CBSNews/247Sports (2nd); AP (2nd)
JaCorey Brooks	WR	Jr.	Athlon Sports (3rd)
Tim Smith	DL	Sr.	Athlon Sports (4th)

== Personnel ==
=== Roster ===
2023 Alabama Crimson Tide Football
Quarterbacks: 4 – Jalen Milroe – (redshirt) Sophomore (6'2, 220); 8 – Tyler Buchner – (redshirt) Sophomore (6'1, 215); 10 – Eli Holstein – Freshman (6'4, 237); 12 – Dylan Lonergan – Freshman (6'2, 212); 15 – Ty Simpson – (redshirt) Freshman (6'2, 203); 16 – Cade Carruth – Sophomore (6'1, 195); 19 – Miguel Camboia – Freshman (6'1, 190; Running backs: 2 – Jase McClellan – Senior (5'11, 212); 5 – Roydell Williams – Senior (5'10, 214); 22 – Justice Haynes – Freshman (5'11, 205); 25 – Richard Young – Freshman (5'11, 200); 26 – Jam Miller – Sophomore (5'10, 211); 27 – Jonathan Bennett – Senior (5'10, 180); 28 – Michael Lorino III – Senior (6'0, 185); 41 – JR Gardner – Freshman (5'11, 185); Wide receivers: 3 – Jermaine Burton – Senior (6'0, 194); 6 – Kobe Prentice – Sophomore (5'10, 182); 7 – Ja'Corey Brooks – Junior (6'2, 195); 11 – Malik Benson – Junior (6'1, 195); 13 – Cole Adams – Freshman (5'10, 186); 14 – Jalen Hale – Freshman (6'1, 189); 16 – Jaren Hamilton – Freshman (6'1, 200); 17 – Isaiah Bond – Sophomore (5'11, 182); 18 – Shazz Preston – (redshirt) Freshman (6'0, 202); 19 – Kendrick Law – Sophomore (5'11, 201); 24 – Emmanuel Henderson – Sophomore (6'1, 185); 32 – Jay Loper Jr. – Sophomore (5'11, 180); 33 – Jack Standeffer – Junior (5'10, 160); 35 – Zarian Courtney – Senior (6'2, 183); 36 – Sawyer Deerman – Freshman (5'10, 175); 37 – Sam Willoughby – Senior (5'10, 165); 39 – Kaleb Fleming – Sophomore (6'1, 205); 42 – MJ Chirgwin – Sophomore (6'0, 195); 48 – Hayden Neighbors – Junior (6'3, 185); Tight ends: 34 – Colby McNeal – (redshirt) Sophomore (6'5, 250); 43 – Robert Ellis – Senior (6'0, 220); 44 – Charlie Skehan – Senior (6'1, 232); 45 – Robbie Ouzts – Junior (6'4, 258); 46 – Peyton Fox – Sophomore (6'4, 225); 47 – Adam Thorsland – Junior (6'5, 232); 49 – Jax Porter – (redshirt) Freshman (6'6, 232); 81 – CJ Dippre – Junior (6'5, 257); 84 – Amari Niblack – Sophomore (6'4, 233); 87 – Danny Lewis Jr. – (redshirt) Freshman (6'5, 255); 88 – Miles Kitselman – Junior (6'5, 250); 89 – Ty Lockwood – Freshman (6'5, 234); Kicker/Punter: 16 – Will Reichard – Grad Student (6'1, 194) (K); 31 – Conor Talty – Freshman (6'2, 195) (K); 86 – James Burnip – (redshirt) Junior (6'6, 220) (P); 96 – Reed Harradine – Freshman (6'3, 185) (K); 97 – Reid Schuback – Junior (6'0, 185) (K); 98 – Upton Bellenfant – Sophomore (6'2, 175) (K); 99 – Nick Serpa – Sophomore (6'4, 215) (P); Long snappers: 48 – Kneeland Hibbett – Junior (6'2, 245); 50 – Brock O'Quinn – Freshman (6'1, 210); 52 – Alex Rozier – Sophomore (6'4, 220); 53 – Kade Wehby – Junior (5'9, 185)	Offensive Lineman: 52 – Tyler Booker – Sophomore (6'5, 352); 54 – Miles McVay – Freshman (6'6, 350); 55 – Roq Montgomery– Freshman (6'3, 332); 56 – Seth McLaughlin – Senior (6'4, 305); 57 – Elijah Pritchett – (redshirt) Freshman (6'6, 312); 58 – James Brockermeyer – (redshirt) Sophomore (6'3, 285); 61 – Graham Roten – Junior (6'3, 285); 62 – Davis Peterson – Freshman (6'1, 235); 63 – Wilder Hines – Sophomore (6'2, 240); 64 – Mac Smith – Freshman (6'3, 270); 65 – JC Latham – Junior (6'6, 360); 66 – Baker Hickman – Freshman (6'3, 315); 68 – Billy Roby – Freshman (5'11, 245); 69 – Terrance Ferguson II – (redshirt) Sophomore (6'4, 322); 71 – Darrian Dalcourt – Grad Student (6'3, 320); 73 – Olaus Alinen – Freshman (6'6, 326); 74 – Kadyn Proctor – Freshman (6'7, 360); 75 – Wilkin Formby – Freshman (6'7, 320); 77 – Jaeden Roberts – (redshirt) Sophomore (6'5, 316); Defensive Lineman: 33 – Hunter Osborne – Freshman (6'4, 275); 44 – Damon Payne Jr. – (redshirt) Sophomore (6'4, 303); 47 – James Smith – Freshman (6'3, 296); 50 – Tim Smith – Senior (6'4, 302); 59 – Anquin Barnes Jr. – (redshirt) Sophomore (6'5, 314); 90 – Jordan Renaud – Freshman (6'4, 261); 91 – Jaheim Oatis – Sophomore (6'5, 320); 92 – Justin Eboigbe – (redshirt) Senior (6'5, 292); 93 – Jah-Marien Latham – (redshirt) Junior (6'3, 275); 94 – Edric Hill – Freshman (6'3, 294); 95 – Monkell Goodwine – (redshirt) sophomore (6'4, 290); 96 – Tim Keenan III – (redshirt) Sophomore (6'2, 315); 97 – Khurtiss Perry – (redshirt) Freshman (6'2, 265); 99 – Isaiah Hastings – (redshirt) Freshman (6'4, 290)	Linebackers: 15 – Dallas Turner – Junior (6'4, 242); 17 – Trezmen Marshall – (redshirt) Senior (6'1, 236); 19 – Keanu Koht – (redshirt) Sophomore (6'4, 232); 28 – Justin Jefferson – Junior (6'2, 225); 30 – Jihaad Campbell – Sophomore (6'3, 230); 31 – Keon Keeley – Freshman (6'5, 242); 32 – Deontae Lawson – (redshirt) Sophomore (6'2, 230); 34 – Quandarrius Robinson – Senior (6'5, 231); 35 – Jeremiah Alexander – (redshirt) Freshman (6'2, 249); 36 – Ian Jackson – (redshirt) Sophomore (6'1, 235); 40 – Kendrick Blackshire – Junior (6'2, 233); 41 – Chris Braswell – Senior (6'3, 255); 42 – Yhonzae Pierre – Freshman (6'3, 223); 43 – Shawn Murphy – (redshirt) Freshman (6'2, 225); 49 – Qua Russaw – Freshman (6'3, 242); 51 – Noland Asberry – Sophomore (6'1, 190); 52 – Braylon Chatman – Freshman (6'0, 200); 53 – Vito Perri – (redshirt) Freshman (6'0, 205); 54 – Kyle Flood Jr. – Senior (6'0, 212); 55 – Bennett Whisenhunt – Senior (6'1, 222); 56 – JD Baird – Sophomore (5'8, 190); 57 – John Thornton II – Freshman (6'1, 205); 58 – Jordan Smith – Senior (5'10, 210); 85 – Lane Whisenhunt – Freshman (6'2, 285); Defensive backs: 1 – Kool-Aid McKinstry – Junior (6'1, 195); 2 – Caleb Downs – Freshman (6'0, 203); 3 – Terrion Arnold – (redshirt) Sophomore (6'1, 196); 4 – Kristian Story – Senior (6'1, 211); 6 – Jaylen Key – (redshirt) Graduate (6'2, 210); 8 – DeVonta Smith – Junior (6'0, 194); 9 – Trey Amos – Senior (6'1, 197); 12 – Antonio Kite – (redshirt) Freshman (6'1, 182); 13 – Malachi Moore – Senior (6'0, 198); 18 – Bray Hubbard – Freshman (6'2, 195); 20 – Earl Little II – (redshirt) Freshman (6'1, 186); 21 – Jake Pope – (redshirt) Freshman (6'1, 192); 25 – Jahlil Hurley – Freshman (6'2, 170); 27 – Tony Mitchell – Freshman (6'2, 205) (S); 29 – Dezz Ricks – Freshman (6'2, 182); 33 – Walter Sansing – Freshman (5'10, 160); 34 – Terrance Howard – Freshman (5'11, 180); 37 – Ty Roper – Sophomore (5'8, 189); 38 – Alijah May – Junior (5'11, 195); 39 – Jake Ivie – Freshman (6'0, 205); 39 – Peyton Yates – Sophomore (5'10, 180); 45 – Caleb McDougle – Senior (5'11, 205); 46 – Chase Davis – Sophomore (6'1, 182); 47 – Kolby Peavy – Freshman (6'1, 180); 48 – Prince Butler – Sophomore (6'1, 200); 49 – Connor Warhurst – Freshman (6'2, 190); Legend: (C) Team captain; (S) Suspended; (I) Ineligible; Injured; Redshirt
Source and player details, 2023 Alabama Crimson Tide Football Commits (08/07/2023):

=== Coaching staff ===
Alabama head coach Nick Saban entered his seventeenth year as the Crimson Tide's head coach for the 2023 season. During his previous seventeen years with Alabama, he led the Crimson Tide to an overall record of 188 wins and 27 losses (.874) and the 2009, 2011, 2012, 2015, 2017 and 2020 national championships.

Name	Position	Consecutive season at Alabama in current position
Nick Saban	Head coach	17th
Tommy Rees	Offensive coordinator/quarterbacks coach	1st
Kevin Steele	Defensive coordinator	1st (3rd overall)
Robert Bala	Safeties/Inside linebackers coach	1st
Joe Cox	Tight end coach	2nd
Robert Gillespie	Running backs coach	3rd
Travaris Robinson	Cornerbacks coach	2nd
Eric Wolford	Offensive line coach	2nd
Holmon Wiggins	Assistant Head Coach/Wide receivers coach	5th
Freddie Roach	Defensive line coach	4th
Coleman Hutzler	Special teams coordinator/Outside linebackers coach	2nd
David Ballou	Strength and conditioning coach	4th
Reference: 2023 Alabama Crimson Tide Football Media Guide

=== Graduate assistants ===
- Kobie Jones – Graduate assistant
- Braxton Barker – Graduate assistant
- Gary Walker Jr. – Graduate assistant
- Kirk Barron – Graduate assistant

=== Analysts ===
- Dean Altobelli – Defensive analyst
- George Banko – Defensive analyst
- Bert Biffani – Defensive analyst
- Jake Long – Defensive analyst
- Jamey Mosley – Defensive analyst
- Charlie Strong – Defensive analyst
- Nick Cochran – Offensive analyst
- Derek Dooley – Offensive analyst
- Ryan Finck – Offensive analyst
- Zach Mettenberger – Offensive analyst
- John McNulty– Offensive analyst
- Ken Whisenhunt – Offensive teams analyst
- Tony Billings – Assistant analyst
- Thomas Fletcher – Special teams analyst
- Nick McGriff – Special teams analyst
- Todd Watson– Special teams analyst

=== Depth chart ===
Defense
3–4

FS
Jaylen Key
Kristian Story
DeVonta Smith

JACK	WILL	MIKE	SAM
Chris Braswell	Deontae Lawson	Trezmen Marshall	Dallas Turner
Keanu Koht	Jihaad Campbell	Kendrick Blackshire	Quandarrius Robinson
Jeremiah Alexander	Justin Jefferson	Shawn Murphy	–

SS
Caleb Downs
Tony Mitchell
Jake Pope

CB
Kool-Aid McKinstry
Antonio Kite
–

DE	NT	DE
Jaheim Oatis	Tim Keenan III	Justin Eboigbe
Tim Smith	Damon Payne Jr.	Jah-Marien Latham
James Smith; Monkell Goodwine	Anquin Barnes Jr.	Jordan Renaud

CB
Terrion Arnold
Trey Amos
–

Offense
Pro-style

WR
Jermaine Burton
Kendrick Law
Shazz Preston

WR
Isaiah Bond
Kobe Prentice
Cole Adams

LT	LG	C	RG	RT
Kadyn Proctor	Tyler Booker	Seth McLaughlin	Darrian Dalcourt	JC Latham
Elijah Pritchett	Terrance Ferguson II	James Brockermeyer	Jaeden Roberts	Miles McVay
–	–	–	—	Wilkin Formby

TE
CJ Dippre
Danny Lewis Jr.
Amari Niblack
Robbie Ouzts

WR
Malik Benson
Ja'Corey Brooks
Jalen Hale

QB
Jalen Milroe
Ty Simpson
Tyler Buchner
Dylan Lonergan

Key reserves
Offense
Defense
Special teams
Out (indefinitely)
Out (season)
Out (suspended)
Out (retired)

Special teams
PK Will Reichard
PK Conor Talty
P James Burnip
P Will Reichard
KR Kendrick Law
Ja'Corey Brooks
Terrion Arnold
Cole Adams
PR Kool-Aid McKinstry
Isaiah Bond
Cole Adams
LS Kneeland Hibbett
H James Burnip

RB
Jase McClellan
Roydell Williams
Jam Miller
Justice Haynes
Richard Young

True Freshman

== Schedule ==
Alabama and the SEC announced the 2023 football schedule on September 20, 2022. The 2023 Crimson Tide' schedule consisted of 7 home games and 5 away games for the regular season. Alabama hosted four SEC conference opponents Arkansas, Ole Miss (rivalry), Tennessee (Third Saturday in October) and arch-rival LSU (rivalry) at home and traveled to four SEC opponents, Kentucky, Mississippi State (rivalry), Texas A&M and in-state-rival Auburn for the 88th annual Iron Bowl to close out the SEC regular season on the road. Alabama was not scheduled to play SEC East opponents Florida (rivalry), Georgia (rivalry),Missouri, South Carolina and Vanderbilt in the 2023 regular season. The Crimson Tide's bye week was during week 9 (on October 28, 2023).

Alabama's out of conference opponents represented the Conference USA, Big 12, American and SoCon conferences. The Crimson Tide hosted three non–conference games which are against Middle Tennessee from the C-USA, Texas from the Big 12 and to close out the regular season with Chattanooga from the SoCon (FCS) and traveled against South Florida from the American.

Date	Time	Opponent	Rank	Site	TV	Result	Attendance
September 2	6:30 p.m.	Middle Tennessee*	No. 4	Bryant–Denny Stadium; Tuscaloosa, AL	SECN	W 56–7	100,077
September 9	6:00 p.m.	No. 11 Texas*	No. 3	Bryant–Denny Stadium; Tuscaloosa, AL (College Gameday, SEC Nation)	ESPN	L 24–34	100,077
September 16	2:30 p.m.	at South Florida*	No. 10	Raymond James Stadium; Tampa, FL	ABC	W 17–3	65,138
September 23	2:30 p.m.	No. 15 Ole Miss	No. 13	Bryant–Denny Stadium; Tuscaloosa, AL (rivalry)	CBS	W 24–10	100,077
September 30	8:00 p.m.	at Mississippi State	No. 12	Davis Wade Stadium; Starkville, MS (rivalry)	ESPN	W 40–17	60,111
October 7	2:30 p.m.	at Texas A&M	No. 11	Kyle Field; College Station, TX	CBS	W 26–20	108,101
October 14	11:00 a.m.	Arkansas^{†}	No. 11	Bryant–Denny Stadium; Tuscaloosa, AL	ESPN	W 24–21	100,077
October 21	2:30 p.m.	No. 17 Tennessee	No. 11	Bryant–Denny Stadium; Tuscaloosa, AL (Third Saturday in October, SEC Nation)	CBS	W 34–20	100,077
November 4	6:45 p.m.	No. 14 LSU	No. 8	Bryant–Denny Stadium; Tuscaloosa, AL (rivalry, College GameDay)	CBS	W 42–28	100,077
November 11	11:00 a.m.	at Kentucky	No. 8	Kroger Field; Lexington, KY (SEC Nation)	ESPN	W 49–21	61,936
November 18	11:00 a.m.	Chattanooga*	No. 8	Bryant–Denny Stadium; Tuscaloosa, AL	SECN+, ESPN+	W 66–10	100,077
November 25	2:30 p.m.	at Auburn	No. 8	Jordan-Hare Stadium; Auburn, AL (Iron Bowl, SEC Nation)	CBS	W 27–24	88,043
December 2	3:00 p.m.	vs. No. 1 Georgia	No. 8	Mercedes-Benz Stadium; Atlanta, GA (SEC Championship Game, rivalry, College GameDay, SEC Nation,)	CBS	W 27–24	78,320
January 1, 2024	4:00 p.m.	vs. No. 1 Michigan*	No. 4	Rose Bowl; Pasadena, CA (Rose Bowl—CFP Semifinal, College GameDay, SEC Nation)	ESPN	L 20–27 ^{OT}	96,371
*Non-conference game; ^{†}Homecoming; Rankings from AP Poll (and CFP Rankings, after October 31) – Released prior to game; All times are in Central time; Source:

== Game summaries ==
=== Middle Tennessee ===
Game One – Middle Tennessee Blue Raiders (0–0) at No. 4 Alabama Crimson Tide (0–0)

Quarter	1	2	3	4	Total
Middle Tennessee	0	0	7	0	7
No. 4 Alabama	14	14	14	14	56

at Bryant–Denny Stadium • Tuscaloosa, Alabama

- Date: Saturday, September 2, 2023
- Game time: 6:30 p.m. CDT
- Game weather: Cloudy • Temperature: 82 °F (28 °C)
- Game attendance: 100,077
- Referee: Daniel Gautreaux
- TV announcers (SECN): Tom Hart (play-by-play), Jordan Rodgers (analyst), and Cole Cubelic (sideline)

Game information

First quarter

- (10:49) ALA – Jalen Milroe 21-yard run (Will Reichard kick) (Drive: 6 plays, 63 yards, 2:58; Alabama 7-0)
- (4:15) ALA – Jase McClellan 1-yard run (Will Reichard kick) (Drive: 11 plays, 47 yards, 5:06; Alabama 14–0)

Second quarter

- (3:07) ALA – Jalen Milroe 13-yard run (Will Reichard kick) (Drive: 2 plays, 42 yards, 0:35; Alabama 21–0)
- (1:58) ALA – Isaiah Bond 47-yard pass from Jalen Milroe (Will Reichard kick) (Drive: 1 play, 47 yards, 0:07; Alabama 28–0)

Third quarter

- (12:54) ALA – Jermaine Burton 48-yard pass from Jalen Milroe (Will Reichard kick) (Drive: 6 plays, 75 yards, 2:06; Alabama 35-0)
- (10:25) ALA – Amari Niblack 29-yard pass from Jalen Milroe (Will Reichard kick) (Drive: 2 plays, 34 yards, 0:41; Alabama 42-0)
- (0:32) MTSU – Bryce Bailey 7-yard pass from Nicholas Vattiato (Zeke Rankin kick) (Drive: 11 plays, 68 yards, 5:58; Alabama 42-7)

Fourth quarter

- (10:38) ALA – Tyler Buchner 9-yard run (Will Reichard kick) (Drive: 10 plays, 77 yards, 4:47; Alabama 49–7)
- (5:58) ALA – Ty Simpson 1-yard run (Conor Talty kick) (Drive: 6 plays, 33 yards, 3:17; Alabama 56–7)

Statistics	MTSU	ALA
First downs	13	23
Total yards	211	431
Rushes/yards	26–78	40–205
Passing yards	133	226
Passing: Comp–Att–Int	24–35–1	17–24–0
Time of possession	30:57	29:03

Team	Category	Player	Statistics
Middle Tennessee	Passing	Nicholas Vattiato	21/32, 127 yards, TD, INT
Middle Tennessee	Rushing	Jekail Middlebrook	8 carries, 32 yards
Middle Tennessee	Receiving	Jaiden Credle	4 receptions, 25 yards
Alabama	Passing	Jalen Milroe	13/18, 194 yards, 3 TD
Alabama	Rushing	Jalen Milroe	7 carries, 48 yards, 2 TD
Alabama	Receiving	Isaiah Bond	5 receptions, 76 yards, TD

=== No. 11 Texas ===
Team	1	2	3	4	Total
• No. 11 Texas	3	10	0	21	34
No. 3 Alabama	0	6	10	8	24

- Date: September 9
- Location: Tuscaloosa, AL
- Game start: 6:14 p.m.
- Game attendance: 100,077
- Game weather: 84, Clear, Wind S @ 5 mph
- Referee: Matt Loeffler
- TV announcers (ESPN): Chris Fowler (play-by-play), Kirk Herbstreit (color), and Holly Rowe (sideline)

Statistics	Texas	Alabama
First downs	24	18
Total yards	454	362
Rushing yards	105	107
Passing yards	349	255
Turnovers	0	2
Time of possession	32:31	27:29

Team	Category	Player	Statistics
Texas	Passing	Quinn Ewers	24/38, 349 yards, 3 TD's
Texas	Rushing	Jonathan Brooks	14 carries, 57 yards, 1 TD
Texas	Receiving	Ja'Tavion Sanders	5 receptions, 114 yards
Alabama	Passing	Jalen Milroe	14/27, 255 yards, 2 TD's, 2 INT's
Alabama	Rushing	Jase McClellan	12 carries, 45 yards
Alabama	Receiving	Kobe Prentice	5 receptions, 68 yards

=== At South Florida ===
Team	1	2	3	4	Total
• No. 10 Alabama	0	3	7	7	17
South Florida	3	0	0	0	3

- Date: September 16
- Location: Tampa, FL
- Game start: 3:42 p.m.
- Game attendance: 65,138
- Game weather: 83, Sunny, Wind NW @ 6 mph
- Referee: Luke Richmond
- TV announcers (ABC): Bob Wischusen (play-by-play), Robert Griffin III (color), and Kris Budden (sideline)

Statistics	Alabama	USF
First downs	15	14
Total yards	310	264
Rushing yards	203	177
Passing yards	107	87
Turnovers	1	2
Time of possession	29:34	30:26

Team	Category	Player	Statistics
Alabama	Passing	Ty Simpson	5/9, 73 yards
Alabama	Rushing	Roydell Williams	17 carries, 129 yards, 1 TD
Alabama	Receiving	CJ Dippre	1 reception, 45 yards
USF	Passing	Byrum Brown	14/28, 87 yards, 1 INT
USF	Rushing	Byrum Brown	23 carries, 92 yards
USF	Receiving	Sean Atkins	6 receptions, 42 yards

=== No. 15 Ole Miss (rivalry) ===
Game Four – No. 15 Ole Miss Rebels (3–0) at No. 13 Alabama Crimson Tide (2–1) – Game summary

Quarter	1	2	3	4	Total
No. 15 Ole Miss	7	0	3	0	10
No. 13 Alabama	3	3	11	7	24

at Bryant-Denny Stadium • Tuscaloosa, AL

- Date: Saturday, September 23, 2023
- Game time: 2:30 p.m. CST
- Game weather: Sunny • Temperature: 89 °F (32 °C)
- Game attendance: 100,077
- Referee: Scott Walker
- TV announcers (CBS): Tom McCarthy (play-by-play), Ross Tucker (analyst), Jason McCourty (analyst), Tiffany Blackmon (sideline)

Game information

First Quarter

- (6:57) ALA – Will Reichard 48-yard field goal (Drive: 11 plays, 61 yards, 6:02; Alabama 3–0)
- (3:55) MISS – Jaxson Dart 10-yard run (Caden Davis kick) (Drive: 7 plays, 75 yards, 3:02; Ole Miss 7–3)

Second Quarter

- (5:42) ALA – Will Reichard 40-yard field goal (Drive: 4 plays, -21 yards, 2:02; Ole Miss 7–6)

Third Quarter

- (11:09) ALA – Will Reichard 23-yard field goal (Drive: 9 plays, 70 yards, 3:51; Alabama 9–7)
- (6:29) ALA – Jalen Hale 33-yard pass from Jalen Milroe (Ty Simpson run) (Drive: 5 plays, 69 yards, 2:38; Alabama 17–7)
- (0:34) MISS – Caden Davis 35-yard field goal (Drive: 14 plays, 58 yards, 5:51; Alabama 17–10)

Fourth Quarter

- (12:10) ALA – Jase McClellan 8-yard run (Will Reichard kick) (Drive: 6 plays, 75 yards, 3:24; Alabama 24–10)

Statistics	MISS	ALA
First downs	17	20
Total yards	301	356
Passing yards	245	225
Rushes/yards	29/56	45/131
Penalties/yards	8/69	6/60
Turnovers	1	1
Time of possession	25:37	34:23

Team	Category	Player	Statistics
Ole Miss	Passing	Jaxson Dart	20/35, 244 yards, INT
Ole Miss	Rushing	Quinshon Judkins	13 carries, 56 yards
Ole Miss	Receiving	Dayton Wade	5 receptions, 88 yards
Alabama	Passing	Jalen Milroe	17/21, 225 yards, TD, INT
Alabama	Rushing	Jase McClellan	17 carries, 105 yards, TD
Alabama	Receiving	Jalen Hale	2 receptions, 63 yards, TD

=== at Mississippi State (rivalry) ===
Game Five – No. 12 Alabama Crimson Tide (3–1) at Mississippi State Bulldogs (2–2) – Game summary

Quarter	1	2	3	4	Total
No. 12 Alabama	14	17	3	6	40
Mississippi State	0	10	7	0	17

at Davis Wade Stadium • Starkville, MS

- Date: Saturday, September 30, 2023
- Game time: 8:00 p.m. CST
- Game weather: Clear, 74 °F (23 °C) Wind NE @ 1 mph
- Game attendance: 60,111
- Referee: Ken Williamson
- TV announcers (ESPN): Mark Jones (play-by-play), Rod Gilmore (analyst), Quint Kessenich (sideline)

Game information

First quarter

- (4:48) ALA – Jalen Milroe 53-yard run (Will Reichard kick) (Drive: 3 plays, 70 yards, 1:21; Alabama 7–0)
- (3:51) ALA – Chris Braswell 28-yard interception return (Will Reichard kick) (Alabama 14–0)

Second quarter

- (12:44) MSST – Kyle Ferrie 31-yard field goal (Drive: 12 plays, 62 yards, 6:07; Alabama 14–3)
- (10:07) ALA – Will Reichard 48-yard field goal (Drive: 6 plays, 46 yards, 2:37; Alabama 17–3)
- (6:26) MSST – Mike Wright 15-yard run (Kyle Ferrie kick) (Drive: 9 plays, 64 yards, 3:41; Alabama 17–10)
- (1:07) ALA – Jase McClellan 2-yard run (Will Reichard kick) (Drive: 12 plays, 75 yards, 5:19; Alabama 24–10)
- (0:31) ALA – Jalen Milroe 10-yard run (Will Reichard kick) (Drive: 3 plays, 31 yards, 0:26; Alabama 31–10)

Third quarter

- (9:11) MSST – Jeffrey Pittman 1-yard pass from Will Rogers (Kyle Ferrie kick) (Drive: 11 plays, 75 yards, 5:49; Alabama 31–17)
- (2:50) ALA – Will Reichard 38-yard field goal (Drive: 12 plays, 54 yards, 6:21; Alabama 34–17)

Fourth quarter

- (9:04) ALA – Will Reichard 34-yard field goal (Drive: 6 plays, 18 yards, 3:29; Alabama 37–17)
- (6:08) ALA – Will Reichard 48-yard field goal (Drive: 4 plays, 4 yards, 1:30; Alabama 40–17)

Statistics	ALA	MSST
First downs	17	15
Total yards	56–357	62–261
Rushing yards	43–193	35–154
Passing yards	164	107
Passing: Comp–Att–Int	10–13–0	15–27–3
Time of possession	30:10	29:50

Team	Category	Player	Statistics
Alabama	Passing	Jalen Milroe	10/12, 164 yards
Alabama	Rushing	Jalen Milroe	11 carries, 69 yards, 2 TD
Alabama	Receiving	Amari Niblack	3 receptions, 61 yards
Mississippi State	Passing	Will Rogers	15/27, 107 yards, TD, 3 INT
Mississippi State	Rushing	Jo'Quavious Marks	9 carries, 68 yards
Mississippi State	Receiving	Jeffery Pittman	2 receptions, 23 yards, TD

=== at Texas A&M ===
Team	1	2	3	4	Total
• No. 11 Alabama	3	7	14	2	26
Texas A&M	3	14	0	3	20

- Date: October 7
- Location: College Station, TX
- Game start: 2:39 p.m.
- Game attendance: 108,101
- Game weather: 74, Sunny, Wind N @ 11 mph
- Referee: Daniel Gautreaux
- TV announcers (CBS): Brad Nessler (play-by-play), Gary Danielson (color), and Jenny Dell (sideline)

Statistics	Alabama	Texas A&M
First downs	16	16
Total yards	344	306
Rushing yards	23	67
Passing yards	321	239
Turnovers	2	1
Time of possession	29:09	30:51

Team	Category	Player	Statistics
Alabama	Passing	Jalen Milroe	21/33, 321 yards, 3 TD’s, 1 INT
Alabama	Rushing	Jase McClellan	12 carries, 45 yards
Alabama	Receiving	Jermaine Burton	9 receptions, 197 yards, 2 TD’s
Texas A&M	Passing	Max Johnson	14/25, 239 yards, 1 TD, 1 INT
Texas A&M	Rushing	Le'Veon Moss	16 carries, 49 yards, 1 TD
Texas A&M	Receiving	Ainias Smith	4 receptions, 88 yards

=== Arkansas ===
Team	1	2	3	4	Total
Arkansas	6	0	7	8	21
• No. 11 Alabama	7	14	3	0	24

- Date: October 14
- Location: Tuscaloosa, AL
- Game start: 11:07 a.m.
- Game attendance: 100,077
- Game weather: 71, Sunny, Wind E @ 7 mph
- Referee: Scott Walker
- TV announcers (ESPN): Dave Pasch (play-by-play), Dusty Dvoracek (color), and Tom Luginbill (sideline)

Statistics	Arkansas	Alabama
First downs	13	18
Total yards	250	415
Rushing yards	100	177
Passing yards	150	238
Turnovers	0	0
Time of possession	30:11	29:49

Team	Category	Player	Statistics
Arkansas	Passing	KJ Jefferson	14/24, 150 yards, 2 TD’s
Arkansas	Rushing	AJ Green	6 carries, 44 yards
Arkansas	Receiving	Andrew Armstrong	4 receptions, 48 yards
Alabama	Passing	Jalen Milroe	10/21, 238 yards, 2 TD’s
Alabama	Rushing	Jase McClellan	16 carries, 83 yards
Alabama	Receiving	Kobe Prentice	2 receptions, 93 yards, 1 TD

=== No. 17 Tennessee (rivalry) ===
Game Eight – No. 17 Tennessee Volunteers (5–1) at No. 11 Alabama Crimson Tide (6–1) – Game summary

Quarter	1	2	3	4	Total
No. 17 Tennessee	13	7	0	0	20
No. 11 Alabama	0	7	17	10	34

at Bryant-Denny Stadium, Tuscaloosa, Alabama

- Date: October 21, 2023
- Game time: 3:30 p.m. EST
- Game weather: Sunny, 80 °F (27 °C), NE @ 5 mph
- Game attendance: 100,077
- Referee: Ken Williamson
- TV announcers (CBS): Brad Nessler (play-by-play), Gary Danielson (analyst), Jenny Dell (sideline)

Game information

First quarter

- (12:39) TENN – Squirrel White 39-yard pass from Joe Milton III (Charles Campbell kick) (Drive: 8 plays, 75 yards, 2:21; Tennessee 7-0)
- (2:00) TENN – Charles Campbell 24-yard field goal (Drive: 15 plays, 79 yards, 5:30; Tennessee 10-0)
- (0:11) TENN – Charles Campbell 26-yard field goal (Drive: 5 plays, 15 yards, 1:05; Tennessee 13-0)

Second quarter

- (7:05) ALA – Jermaine Burton 10-yard pass from Jalen Milroe (Will Reichard kick) (Drive: 9 plays, 59 yards, 4:05; Tennessee 13-7)
- (0:12) TENN – McCallan Castles 6-yard pass from Joe Milton III (Charles Campbell kick) (Drive: 10 plays, 80 yards, 2:58; Tennessee 20-7)

Third quarter

- (14:19) ALA – Isaiah Bond 46-yard pass from Jalen Milroe (Will Reichard kick) (Drive: 2 plays, 75 yards, 0:41; Tennessee 20-14)
- (8:33) ALA – Will Reichard 42-yard field goal (Drive: 6 plays, 46 yards, 3:58; Tennessee 20-17)
- (3:42) ALA – Jase McClellan 5-yard run (Will Reichard kick) (Drive: 5 plays, 47 yards, 2:42; Alabama 24-20)

Fourth quarter

- (8:17) ALA – Will Reichard 50-yard field goal (Drive: 15 plays, 56 yards, 7:51; Alabama 27-20)
- (7:26) ALA – Jihaad Campbell 24-yard fumble return (Will Reichard kick) (Alabama 34-20)

Statistics	TENN	ALA
First downs	22	20
Total yards	404	358
Rushing yards	133	138
Passing yards	271	220
Passing: Comp–Att–Int	28–41–0	14–21–1
Time of possession	27:41	32:19

Team	Category	Player	Statistics
Tennessee	Passing	Joe Milton III	28/41, 271 yards, 2 TD
Tennessee	Rushing	Joe Milton III	15 carries, 59 yards
Tennessee	Receiving	Squirrel White	10 receptions, 111 yards, TD
Alabama	Passing	Jalen Milroe	14/21, 220 yards, 2 TD, INT
Alabama	Rushing	Jase McClellan	27 carries, 115 yards, TD
Alabama	Receiving	Isaiah Bond	3 receptions, 77 yards, TD

=== No. 14 LSU ===
Team	1	2	3	4	Total
No. 14 LSU	7	14	7	0	28
• No. 8 Alabama	14	7	14	7	42

- Date: November 4
- Location: Tuscaloosa, AL
- Game start: 6:45 p.m.
- Game attendance: 100,077
- Game weather: 63, Clear, Wind NE @ 1 mph
- Referee: Daniel Gautreaux
- TV announcers (CBS): Brad Nessler (play-by-play), Gary Danielson (color), and Jenny Dell (sideline)

Statistics	LSU	Alabama
First downs	21	28
Total yards	478	507
Rushing yards	206	288
Passing yards	272	219
Turnovers	1	0
Time of possession	26:27	33:33

Team	Category	Player	Statistics
LSU	Passing	Jayden Daniels	15/24, 219 yards, 2 TD’s, 1 INT
LSU	Rushing	Jayden Daniels	11 carries, 163 yards, 1 TD
LSU	Receiving	Malik Nabers	10 receptions, 171 yards, 1 TD
Alabama	Passing	Jalen Milroe	15/23, 219 yards
Alabama	Rushing	Jalen Milroe	20 carries, 155 yards, 4 TD’s
Alabama	Receiving	Isaiah Bond	5 receptions, 60 yards

=== At Kentucky ===
Game Ten – No. 8 Alabama Crimson Tide (8-1) at Kentucky Wildcats (6–3) – Game summary

Quarter	1	2	3	4	Total
No. 8 Alabama	21	7	7	14	49
Kentucky	7	0	7	7	21

at Kroger Field, Lexington, Kentucky

- Date: Saturday, November 11, 2023
- Game time: 12:00 p.m. EST
- Game weather: 49, Sunny, Wind NE @ 7 mph
- Game attendance: 61,936
- Referee: Ken Williamson
- TV announcers (ESPN): Joe Tessitore (play-by-play), Jordan Rodgers (color), and Katie George (sideline)

Game information

First quarter

- (9:38) ALA – Amari Niblack 26-yard pass from Jalen Milroe (Will Reichard kick) (Drive: 10 plays, 80 yards, 5:13; Alabama 7-0)
- (5:32) ALA – Kobe Prentice 40-yard pass from Jalen Milroe (Will Reichard kick) (Drive: 4 plays, 55 yards, 1:51; Alabama 14-0)
- (5:12) ALA – Jalen Milroe 1-yard run (Will Reichard kick) (Drive: 1 play, 1 yard, 0:14; Alabama 21-0)
- (1:30) UK – Tayvion Robinson 6-yard pass from Devin Leary (Alex Raynor kick) (Drive: 6 plays, 32 yards, 2:43; Alabama 21-7)

Second quarter

- (10:14) ALA – Roydell Williams 26-yard pass from Jalen Milroe (Will Reichard kick) (Drive: 5 plays, 62 yards, 2:34; Alabama 28-7)

Third quarter

- (10:53) UK – Ray Davis 2-yard run (Alex Raynor kick) (Drive: 10 plays, 75 yards, 4:07; Alabama 28-14)
- (9:36) ALA – Jalen Milroe 3-yard run (Will Reichard kick) (Drive: 9 plays, 65 yards, 1:10; Alabama 35-14)

Fourth quarter

- (14:48) ALA – Jalen Milroe 1-yard run (Will Reichard kick) (Drive: 8 plays, 38 yards, 2:54; Alabama 42-14)
- (9:46) ALA – Jam Miller 3-yard run (Will Reichard kick) (Drive: 7 plays, 66 yards, 3:21; Alabama 49-14)
- (7:46) UK – Ray Davis 1-yard run (Alex Raynor kick) (Drive: 4 plays, 75 yards, 2:00; Alabama 49-21)

Statistics	ALA	UK
First downs	23	11
Total yards	64–444	55–253
Rushing yards	39–159	24–95
Passing yards	285	158
Passing: Comp–Att–Int	16–25–1	17–31–1
Time of possession	32:06	27:54

Team	Category	Player	Statistics
Alabama	Passing	Jalen Milroe	15/22, 234 yards, 3 TD, INT
Alabama	Rushing	Jase McClellan	9 carries, 43 yards
Alabama	Receiving	Kobe Prentice	4 receptions, 74 yards, TD
Kentucky	Passing	Devin Leary	17/31, 158 yards, TD, INT
Kentucky	Rushing	Ramon Jefferson	2 carries, 73 yards
Kentucky	Receiving	Dane Key	4 receptions, 46 yards

=== No. 18 (FCS) Chattanooga ===
Team	1	2	3	4	Total
Chattanooga	0	7	3	0	10
• No. 8 Alabama	21	17	14	14	66

- Date: November 18
- Location: Tuscaloosa, AL
- Game start: 11:02 a.m.
- Game attendance: 100,077
- Game weather: 67, Sunny, Wind S @ 8 mph
- Referee: Lee Hendrick
- TV announcers (ESPN+/SECN+): John Schriffen (play-by-play), Rocky Boiman (color), and Dawn Davenport (sideline)

Statistics	Chattanooga	Alabama
First downs	11	21
Total yards	233	574
Rushing yards	126	315
Passing yards	107	259
Turnovers	1	0
Time of possession	33:31	26:29

Team	Category	Player	Statistics
Chattanooga	Passing	Luke Schomburg	10/21, 107 yards, 1 INT
Chattanooga	Rushing	Gino Appleberry	22 carries, 104 yards, 1 TD
Chattanooga	Receiving	Javin Whatley	4 receptions, 69 yards
Alabama	Passing	Jalen Milroe	13/16, 197 yards, 3 TD’s
Alabama	Rushing	Ty Simpson	1 carry, 78 yards
Alabama	Receiving	Jermaine Burton	3 receptions, 105 yards, 1 TD

=== At Auburn ===
Iron Bowl

Team	1	2	3	4	Total
• No. 8 Alabama	7	10	3	7	27
Auburn	7	7	7	3	24

- Date: November 25
- Location: Auburn, AL
- Game start: 2:40 p.m.
- Game attendance: 88,043
- Game weather: 65, Sunny, Wind SE @ 7 mph
- Referee: Jason Autrey
- TV announcers (CBS): Brad Nessler (play-by-play), Gary Danielson (color), and Jenny Dell (sideline)

Statistics	Alabama	Auburn
First downs	21	18
Total yards	451	337
Rushing yards	192	244
Passing yards	259	93
Turnovers	0	3
Time of possession	32:43	27:17

Team	Category	Player	Statistics
Alabama	Passing	Jalen Milroe	16/24, 259 yards, 2 TD’s
Alabama	Rushing	Jalen Milroe	18 carries, 107 yards
Alabama	Receiving	Jermaine Burton	4 receptions, 107 yards, 1 TD
Auburn	Passing	Payton Thorne	5/16, 91 yards, 1 TD, 2 INT’s
Auburn	Rushing	Jarquez Hunter	14 carries, 93 yards
Auburn	Receiving	Ja’Varrius Johnson	4 receptions, 76 yards, 1 TD

=== vs No. 1 Georgia (SEC Championship) ===
SEC Championship - Georgia Bulldogs (12-0) vs Alabama Crimson Tide (11-1) – Game summary

Quarter	1	2	3	4	Total
No. 1 Georgia	7	0	3	14	24
No. 8 Alabama	3	14	3	7	27

at Mercedes-Benz Stadium • Atlanta, Georgia

- Date: Saturday, December 2, 2023
- Game time: 4:00 pm EST
- Game weather: N/A (Indoor Stadium)
- Game attendance: 78,320
- Referee: Kyle Olson
- TV announcers (CBS): Brad Nessler (Play-by-Play), Gary Danielson (Color Commentator), and Jenny Dell (Sideline Reporter)

Game information

First quarter

- (9:31) UGA – Kendall Milton 17-Yd Run (Peyton Woodring Kick) (Drive: 8 plays, 83 yards, 3:50; Georgia 7-0)
- (3:43) ALA – Will Reichard 43-Yd Field Goal (Drive: 8 plays, 26 yards, 3:48; Georgia 7-3)

Second quarter

- (12:04) ALA – Jam Miller 28-Yd pass from Jalen Milroe (Will Reichard Kick) (Drive: 10 plays, 92 yards, 4:32, Alabama 10-7)
- (0:48) ALA – Jermaine Burton 15-Yd pass from Jalen Milroe (Will Reichard Kick) (Drive: 9 plays, 69 yards, 3:49; Alabama 17-7)

Third Quarter

- (8:51) UGA – Peyton Woodring 34-Yd Field Goal (Drive: 5 plays, 54 yards, 1:45; Alabama 17-10)
- (0:48) ALA – Will Reichard 28-Yd Field Goal (Drive: 4 plays, 1 yard, 1:26; Alabama 20-10)

Fourth quarter

- (10:16) UGA – Carson Beck 1-Yd Run (Peyton Woodring Kick) (Drive: 4 plays, 35 yards, 1:37; Alabama 20-17)
- (5:47) ALA – Roydell Williams 1-Yd Run (Will Reichard Kick) (Drive: 9 plays, 75 yards, 4:29; Alabama 27-17)
- (2:52) UGA – Kendall Milton 1-Yd Run (Peyton Woodring Kick) (Drive: 10 plays, 75 yards, 2:55; Alabama 27-24)

Statistics	UGA	ALA
First downs	19	20
Total yards	60-321	64-306
Rushing yards	31-78	41-114
Passing yards	243	192
Passing: Comp–Att–Int	21-29-0	13-23-0
Time of possession	28:51	31:09

Team	Category	Player	Statistics
Georgia	Passing	Carson Beck	21/29, 243 yards
Georgia	Rushing	Kendall Milton	13 carries, 42 yards, 2 TD
Georgia	Receiving	Brock Bowers	5 receptions, 53 yards
Alabama	Passing	Jalen Milroe	13/23, 192 yards, 2 TD
Alabama	Rushing	Roydell Williams	16 carries, 64 yards, TD
Alabama	Receiving	Isaiah Bond	5 receptions, 79 yards

=== vs. No. 1 Michigan ===
Rose Bowl Game- CFP Semifinal

Team	1	2	3	4	OT	Total
No. 4 Alabama	7	3	0	10	0	20
• No. 1 Michigan	7	6	0	7	7	27

- Date: January 1, 2024
- Location: Pasadena, CA
- Game start: 2:11 p.m.
- Game attendance: 96,371
- Game weather: 64, Sunny, Wind S @ 2 mph
- Referee: Michael Vandervelde
- TV announcers (ESPN): Chris Fowler (play-by-play), Kirk Herbstreit (color), Holly Rowe and Laura Rutledge (sideline)

Statistics	Alabama	Michigan
First downs	17	15
Total yards	288	351
Rushing yards	172	130
Passing yards	116	221
Turnovers	1	1
Time of possession	32:19	27:41

Team	Category	Player	Statistics
Alabama	Passing	Jalen Milroe	16/23, 116 yards
Alabama	Rushing	Jase McClellan	14 carries, 87 yards, 2 TD’s
Alabama	Receiving	Isaiah Bond	4 receptions, 47 yards
Michigan	Passing	J. J. McCarthy	17/27, 221 yards, 3 TD’s
Michigan	Rushing	Blake Corum	19 carries, 83 yards, 1 TD
Michigan	Receiving	Roman Wilson	4 receptions, 73 yards, 1 TD

== Rankings ==
Ranking movements Legend: ██ Increase in ranking ██ Decrease in ranking т = Tied with team above or below ( ) = First-place votes
	Week															
Poll	Pre	1	2	3	4	5	6	7	8	9	10	11	12	13	14	Final
AP	4	3	10	13	12	11	11	11	9	8	8	8	8	8	5	5
Coaches	3 (4)	3 (2)	10	12	11	10	10	8т	8	8	8	8	8	8	4т (3)	5
CFP	Not released									8	8	8	8	8	4	Not released

== Awards and honors ==
SEC Weekly Honors
Recipient	Weekly Award	Week #	Date awarded	Ref.
SEC Co-Offensive Player of the Week	Jalen Milroe (RS So., QB)	Week 1	Sep 5	
SEC Co-Freshman Player of the Week	Caleb Downs (Fr., DB)	Week 1	Sep 5	
SEC Offensive Lineman Player of the Week	Tyler Booker (GS., OL)	Week 4	Sep 25	
SEC Co-Freshman Player of the Week	Caleb Downs (2) (Fr., DB)	Week 5	Oct 2	
SEC Special Teams Player of the Week	Will Reichard (GS., PK)	Week 6	Oct 9	
SEC Defensive Lineman Player of the Week	Justin Eboigbe (RS Sr., DL)	Week 6	Oct 9	
SEC Offensive Lineman Player of the Week	JC Latham (RS Jr., OL)	Week 7	Oct 16	
SEC Co-Defensive Player of the Week	Jihaad Campbell (So., LB)	Week 8	Oct 23	
SEC Special Teams Player of the Week	Will Reichard (2) (GS., PK)	Week 8	Oct 23	
SEC Co-Offensive Player of the Week	Jalen Milroe (2) (RS So., QB)	Week 10	Nov 6	
SEC Co-Offensive Player of the Week	Jalen Milroe (3) (RS So., QB)	Week 13	Nov 27	
SEC Co-Freshman Player of the Week	Kaydn Proctor (Fr., OL)	Week 13	Nov 27	

=== SEC Conference Individual Yearly awards ===
Southeastern Conference Individual Awards
Recipient	Award	Date awarded	Ref.
Dallas Turner	Defensive Player of the Year (Coaches)	12/06/23	
Caleb Downs	Freshman of the Year	12/06/23	
Will Reichard	Special Teams Player of the Year	12/06/23	

=== All-Americans ===
All-SEC
Player	Position	1st team/2nd Team
JC Latham	OL	1st team
Justin Eboigbe	DL	1st team
Caleb Downs	CB	1st team
Kool-Aid McKinstry	CB	1st team
Terrion Arnold	CB	1st team
Will Reichard	PK	1st team/2nd team
Kneeland Hibbett	LS	1st team
James Burnip	P	2nd team
Tyler Booker	OL	2nd team
HM = Honorable mention. Source:

All-SEC Freshman
Player	Position
Kadyn Procter	OL
Caleb Downs	CB
HM = Honorable mention. Source:

PFF
Player	Position	1st/2nd team
Caleb Downs	CB	1st team
James Burnip	P	1st team
JC Latham	OL	2nd team
Kool-Aid McKinstry	CB	2nd team
Terrion Arnold	CB	2nd team
HM = Honorable mention. Source:

CBS Sports / 247Sports
Player	Position	1st/2nd team
Kool-Aid McKinstry	CB	1st team
Dallas Turner	LB	1st team
Terrion Arnold	CB	2nd team
JC Latham	OL	2nd team
Will Reichard	PK	2nd team
HM = Honorable mention. Source:

AP
Player	Position	1st/2nd/3rd team
Kool-Aid McKinstry	CB	1st team
Dallas Turner	LB	1st team
Terrion Arnold	CB	1st team
JC Latham	OL	2nd team
Will Reichard	PK	3rd team
Caleb Downs	CB	2nd team
HM = Honorable mention. Source:

The Associated Press (SEC)
Player	Position	1st/2nd team
JC Latham	OL	1st team
Tyler Booker	OL	1st team
Will Reichard	PK	1st team
Dallas Turner	LB	1st team
Kool-Aid McKinstry	CB	1st team
Jalen Milroe	QB	2nd team
Justin Eboigbe	DL	2nd team
Terrion Arnold	DB	2nd team
Caleb Downs	DB	2nd team
HM = Honorable mention. Source:

Walter Camp
Player	Position	1st/2nd team
JC Latham	OL	2nd team
Dallas Turner	LB	2nd team
Kool-Aid McKinstry	CB	2nd team
HM = Honorable mention. Source:

NCAA Recognized All-American Honors
Player	AFCA	FWAA	TSN	Designation
Dallas Turner (LB)	1st team	1st team	1st team	Consensus
JC Latham (OL)	–	2nd team	2nd team	–
Will Reichard (PK)	–	–	2nd team	–
Caleb Downs (CB)	–	–	2nd team	–
Terrion Arnold (CB)	2nd team	–	2nd team	–
Kool-Aid McKinstry (CB)	2nd team	–	1st team	–
The NCAA recognizes a selection to all five of the AFCA, FWAA and TSN first teams for unanimous selections and three of five for consensus selections. HM = Honorable mention. Source:

Other All-American Honors
Player	Athletic	Athlon	BR	CFN	ESPN	Fox Sports	Phil Steele	SI	USA Today
Dallas Turner (LB)	1st team	1st team	–		1st team	2nd team	1st team	2nd team	1st team
Kool-Aid McKinstry (CB)	2nd team	1st team	1st team		2nd team	–	3rd team	1st team	1st team
Caleb Downs (CB)	–	2nd team	–		–	–	–	–	2nd team
Terrion Arnold (CB)	–	2nd team	–		1st team	–	4th team	–	–
JC Latham (OL)	–	2nd team	–		–	–	2nd team	–	2nd team
Darrin Dalcourt (OL)	–	–	–		–	–	–	2nd team	–
Will Reichard (Pk)	–	3rd team	–		–	–	4th team	–	–
James Burnip (P)	–	3rd team	–		–	–	–	–	–

== Postseason ==
=== Bowl games/College Football Playoff ===
==== Senior Bowl ====
Player	#	Position	Class
Will Reichard	16	Placekicker	Graduate Student
Chris Braswell	41	Linebacker	Senior
Justin Eboigbe	92	Defensive lineman	Redshirt Senior

==== East–West Shrine Bowl ====
Player	#	Position	Class
Jaylen Key	27	Safety	Graduate Student
Trezmen Marshall	45	Linebacker	Redshirt Senior

==== Tropical Bowl ====
Player	#	Position	Class
Darrian Dalcourt	68	Offensive lineman	Graduate Student

== NFL draft ==
The NFL draft was held at Campus Martius Park in Detroit, MI on April 25–27, 2024.

Crimson Tide who were picked in the 2024 NFL Draft:

Round	Pick	Player	Position	NFL team
1	7	JC Latham	OT	Tennessee Titans
1	17	Dallas Turner	LB	Minnesota Vikings
1	24	Terrion Arnold	CB	Detroit Lions
2	41	Kool-Aid McKinstry	CB	New Orleans Saints
2	57	Chris Braswell	LB	Tampa Bay Buccaneers
3	80	Jermaine Burton	WR	Cincinnati Bengals
4	105	Justin Eboigbe	DE	Los Angeles Chargers
6	186	Jase McClellan	RB	Atlanta Falcons
6	203	Will Reichard	K	Minnesota Vikings
7	257	Jaylen Key	DB	New York Jets
