= Seth McLaughlin =

American football player (born 2001)

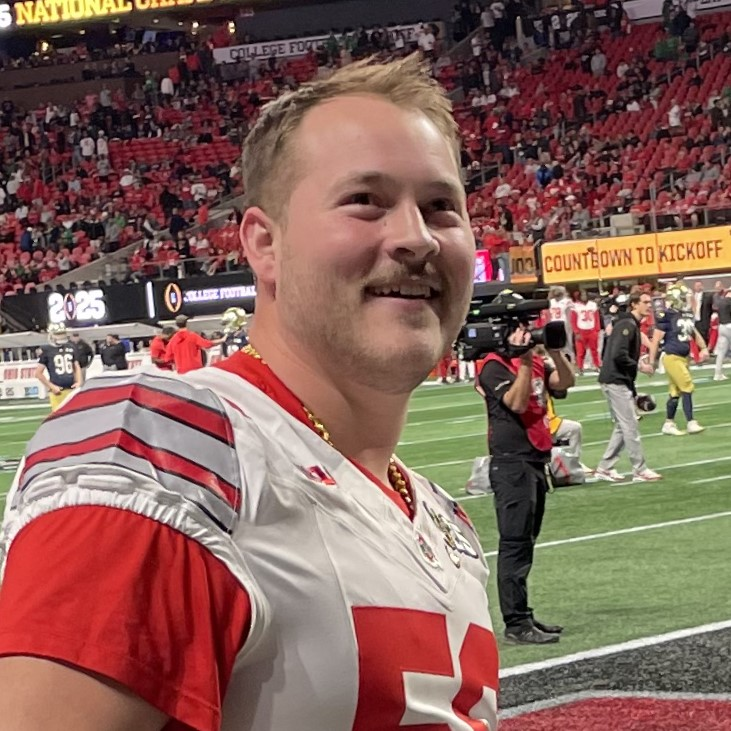
- McLaughlin with the Ohio State Buckeyes at the 2025 CFP National Championship

No. 65 – Detroit Lions
- Position: Center
- Roster status: Active

Personal information
- Born: August 27, 2001 (age 25); Alcoa, Tennessee, U.S.
- Listed height: 6 ft 4 in (1.93 m)
- Listed weight: 304 lb (138 kg)

Career information
- High school: Buford (Buford, Georgia)
- College: Alabama (2020–2023); Ohio State (2024)
- NFL draft: 2025: undrafted

Career history
- Cincinnati Bengals (2025)*; Detroit Lions (2026–present)
- * Offseason or practice squad member only

Awards and highlights
- 2× CFP national champion (2020, 2024); 2× SEC champion (2021, 2023); Rimington Trophy (2024); Consensus All-American (2024); First-team All-Big Ten (2024); 2× First-team Academic All-American (2023, 2024)

Career NFL statistics as of Week 5, 2026
- Games played: 1
- Stats at Pro Football Reference

Seth McLaughlin (born August 27, 2001) is an American professional football center for the Detroit Lions of the National Football League (NFL). He played college football for the Alabama Crimson Tide and Ohio State Buckeyes. McLaughlin signed with the Cincinnati Bengals as an undrafted free agent following the 2025 NFL draft.

== Early life ==
McLaughlin was born in Alcoa, Tennessee and moved with his family to Buford, Georgia the summer before his freshman year of high school. He attended Buford High School, where he played center & left tackle on a Wolves offense that scored 467 points and rushed for 3,400 yards during his senior season in 2019. Buford won the Class 5A Georgia state championship that year, and McLaughlin was named a PrepStar All-Southeast Region honoree.

He held offers from Michigan, Georgia, Auburn, LSU, Oklahoma, Miami, Florida State, and South Carolina, among more than a dozen Power Five programs, before committing to play college football for the Alabama Crimson Tide. Rated a three-star recruit by 247Sports and Rivals and a four-star by ESPN—which ranked him the No. 4 center nationally—McLaughlin signed with Alabama on December 18, 2019.

== College career ==
=== Alabama (2020–2023) ===
As a freshman in 2020, McLaughlin played in two games. That season, he was part of Alabama's national championship run. As a redshirt freshman in 2021, McLaughlin saw his first significant action when he replaced Darrian Dalcourt at center in the second half of the Iron Bowl, a quadruple-overtime win over rival Auburn that was the first overtime game in Iron Bowl history. The following week, he made his first career start in the 2021 SEC Championship Game against top-ranked Georgia, whose defense entered the game ranked No. 1 nationally in both scoring (6.9 points per game) and total yards allowed; Alabama won 41–24. McLaughlin retained the starting center role through the rest of the postseason, starting in Alabama's Cotton Bowl College Football Playoff semifinal win over Cincinnati and in the 2022 College Football Playoff National Championship, a 33–18 loss to Georgia.

In 2022, McLaughlin played in 11 games while making eight starts and logged 913 snaps, allowing one sack and 14 pressures per Pro Football Focus while helping Alabama's offense rank fourth nationally at 5.55 yards per carry. He entered the 2023 season on the Rimington Trophy watchlist, awarded to the nation's best center, and started all 14 games at center as Alabama won the SEC Championship and reached the College Football Playoff. Alabama's offense used a clap cadence in shotgun, and McLaughlin had several errant snaps during the 2023 season. One occurred in the 2023 Iron Bowl, when Auburn safety Zion Puckett clapped before the snap on a critical second-down play, which Alabama left guard Tyler Booker confirmed on film and which head coach Nick Saban said should have been penalized as illegal simulation of the snap count. The resulting bad snap and a subsequent penalty helped create a fourth-and-31 situation from the Auburn 31-yard line, from which quarterback Jalen Milroe completed a 31-yard touchdown pass to Isaiah Bond in the back corner of the end zone with 32 seconds left, on a play Bond later named "Grave Digger". The score gave Alabama a 27–24 win and kept the Crimson Tide's College Football Playoff hopes alive. Snap issues continued in the 2024 Rose Bowl, a College Football Playoff semifinal in which McLaughlin had three errant snaps, including a low snap on the final play of the game, a fourth-and-goal in overtime. On the play, Milroe was stopped short of the end zone on a designed run, with analysts also noting that Michigan's defensive line, including a key block from edge rusher Josaiah Stewart on right tackle JC Latham, collapsed the pocket before Milroe could execute the run. Saban later attributed the broader snap issues to a miscommunication, saying that while Michigan was not actually clapping, McLaughlin had been reacting to ambient noise he mistook for Milroe's clap cadence. Following the loss, McLaughlin entered the NCAA transfer portal.

In McLaughlin's career with the Crimson Tide, he appeared in 35 games with 24 being starts.

=== Ohio State (2024) ===
McLaughlin entered the NCAA transfer portal on January 4, 2024, and announced his transfer to Ohio State three days later. He started the first 10 games of the 2024 season at center and was a central figure on a Buckeyes offensive line that finished fourth nationally in tackles for loss allowed (42) and 16th in sacks allowed (13). According to Pro Football Focus, McLaughlin did not allow a sack and surrendered just seven pressures in his ten games, and graded as a Buckeyes "champion" in all ten.

On November 19, 2024, McLaughlin ruptured his Achilles tendon in practice, ending his playing season. Despite the injury, he was named a semifinalist for the Outland Trophy as the only center among the seven semifinalists, a consensus first-team All-American, and first-team All-Big Ten on the conference head coaches' ballot. On December 12, 2024, he was awarded the Rimington Trophy as the nation's outstanding center, becoming the fourth Ohio State player to win the award and the first since Billy Price in 2017. The win also gave Ohio State the outright lead for most Rimington Trophy winners of any program. McLaughlin and teammate Donovan Jackson also became just the third and fourth players in Ohio State history to earn first-team All-American honors and first-team Academic All-American honors in the same year, joining Bob White in 1958 and Randy Gradishar in 1973.

McLaughlin remained with the team for the postseason in a leadership capacity, with head coach Ryan Day calling him "almost like a coach" for the younger linemen. Ohio State went on to win four straight College Football Playoff games, defeating Notre Dame 34–23 in the 2025 College Football Playoff National Championship, giving McLaughlin his second national championship ring after the 2020 Alabama title.

== Professional career ==
Pre-draft measurables
Height	Weight	Arm length	Hand span	Wingspan
6 ft 4 in (1.93 m)	304 lb (138 kg)	31 in (0.79 m)	9 1/2 in (0.24 m)	6 ft 6 1/4 in (1.99 m)
All values from NFL Combine

=== Cincinnati Bengals ===
On May 9, 2025, Seth signed with the Cincinnati Bengals as an undrafted free agent. He was the best available player not to be drafted in 2025 according to ESPN (ranked as the 135th best player and 2nd best center). On July 30, McLaughlin passed a physical and was cleared to practice. He had been on the Active/Non-Football Injury list since July 19 while recovering from the ruptured Achilles he suffered in November 2024 at Ohio State. McLaughlin was waived on August 26 as part of final roster cuts and re-signed to the practice squad the next day.

=== Detroit Lions ===
On January 6, 2026, McLaughlin signed a reserve/future contract with the Detroit Lions. He was waived by the Lions on September 3. On September 7, Detroit re–signed McLaughlin to their practice squad. On September 23, McLaughlin was signed to the active roster.
