= Jam Miller =

American football player (born 2004)

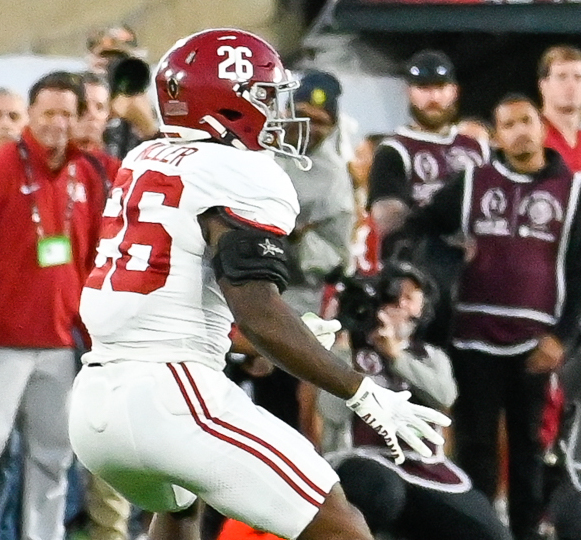
- Miller in 2024

No. 38 – Atlanta Falcons
- Position: Running back
- Roster status: Practice squad

Personal information
- Born: April 29, 2004 (age 22); Tyler, Texas, U.S.
- Listed height: 5 ft 10 in (1.78 m)
- Listed weight: 209 lb (95 kg)

Career information
- High school: Tyler Legacy
- College: Alabama (2022–2025)
- NFL draft: 2026: 7th round, 245th overall pick

Career history
- New England Patriots (2026)*; Atlanta Falcons (2026–present)*
- * Offseason or practice squad member only
- Stats at Pro Football Reference

Jamarion Miller (born April 29, 2004) is an American professional football running back for the Atlanta Falcons of the National Football League (NFL). He played college football for the Alabama Crimson Tide and was selected by the Patriots in the seventh round of the 2026 NFL draft.

== Early life ==
Miller is from Tyler, Texas. He attended Tyler Legacy High School and became a top player for the football team. He ran for 1,631 yards and 20 touchdowns as a junior. He then had 166 carries for 1,406 yards and 13 touchdowns, along with 29 receptions for 380 yards and six touchdowns as a senior. In his high school career, Miller set the Tyler Legacy records with 4,908 rushing yards and 65 total touchdowns. He was ranked a four-star prospect and the fourth-best running back – as well as the 78th-best player overall – nationally by 247Sports. He initially committed to play college football for the Texas Longhorns but later flipped his commitment to the Alabama Crimson Tide.

== College career ==
As a true freshman at Alabama in 2022, Miller ran 33 times for 233 yards and two touchdowns, playing behind Roydell Williams and Jase McClellan. In 2023, he remained a backup to Williams and McClellan, totaling 41 rushes for 201 yards and a touchdown along with four receptions for 73 yards and a touchdown. After the two left the Crimson Tide in 2024, Miller became one of Alabama's two top running backs for the 2024 season, alongside Justice Haynes. Two games into the 2024 season, Miller had his first 100-yard rushing performance, totaling 140 yards on 15 carries with a touchdown in a 42–16 over South Florida.

== Professional career ==
Pre-draft measurables
Height	Weight	Arm length	Hand span	Wingspan	40-yard dash	10-yard split	20-yard split	Vertical jump	Broad jump
5 ft 10 1/4 in (1.78 m)	209 lb (95 kg)	30 3/8 in (0.77 m)	8 3/4 in (0.22 m)	6 ft 2 1/4 in (1.89 m)	4.42 s	1.53 s	2.58 s	30.5 in (0.77 m)	9 ft 7 in (2.92 m)
All values from NFL Combine

=== New England Patriots ===
Miller was selected by the New England Patriots in the seventh round, 245th overall, of the 2026 NFL draft. He was waived by the Patriots as a part of final roster cuts on August 30, 2026.

=== Atlanta Falcons ===
On October 6, 2026, Miller signed with the Atlanta Falcons' practice squad.
