= JC Latham =

American football player (born 2003)

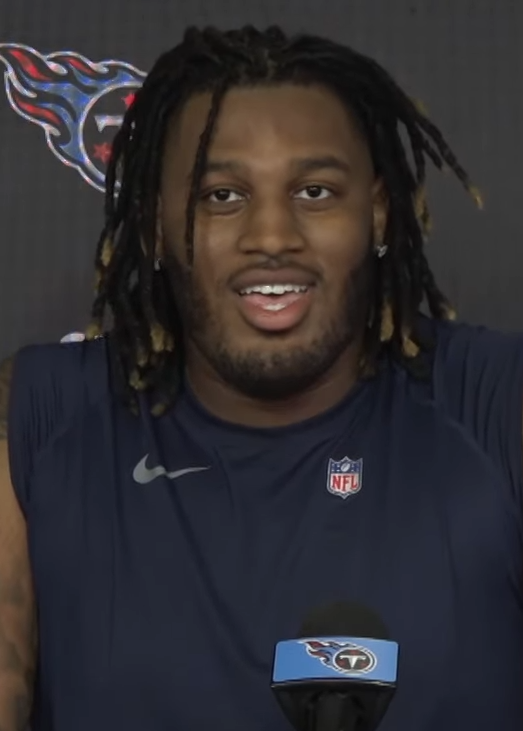
- Latham with the Tennessee Titans in 2024

No. 55 – Tennessee Titans
- Position: Offensive tackle
- Roster status: Active

Personal information
- Born: February 8, 2003 (age 23); Meridian, Mississippi, U.S.
- Listed height: 6 ft 6 in (1.98 m)
- Listed weight: 342 lb (155 kg)

Career information
- High school: Catholic Memorial (Waukesha, Wisconsin) : IMG Academy (Bradenton, Florida)
- College: Alabama (2021–2023)
- NFL draft: 2024: 1st round, 7th overall pick

Career history
- Tennessee Titans (2024–present)

Awards and highlights
- First-team All-SEC (2023)

Career NFL statistics as of Week 7, 2026
- Games played: 37
- Games started: 37
- Fumble recoveries: 4
- Stats at Pro Football Reference

Jerome "JC" Latham (born February 8, 2003) is an American professional football offensive tackle for the Tennessee Titans of the National Football League (NFL). He played college football for the Alabama Crimson Tide and was selected seventh overall by the Titans in the 2024 NFL draft.

== Early life ==
Latham was born on February 8, 2003, in Meridian, Mississippi, and grew up in Oak Creek, Wisconsin. He originally attended Catholic Memorial High School in Waukesha, Wisconsin, before transferring to IMG Academy in Bradenton, Florida. He played offensive tackle and defensive end in high school. He was selected to play in the 2020 Under Armour All-America Game. A five-star recruit, Latham committed to the University of Alabama to play college football.

== College career ==
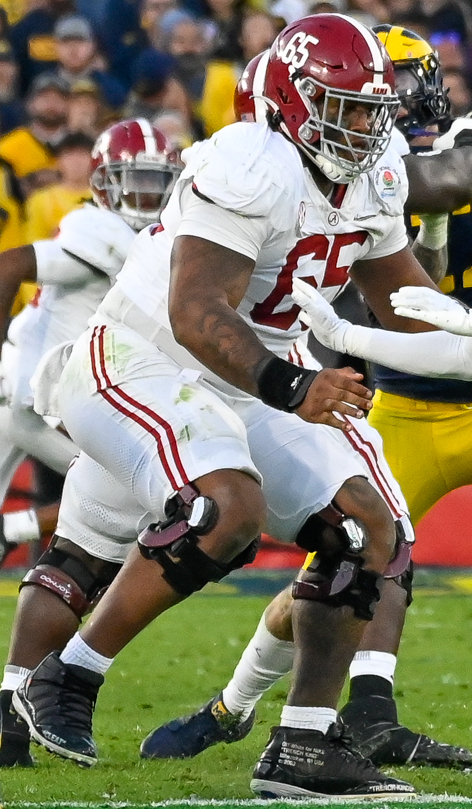
Latham with the Alabama Crimson Tide in 2024

Latham played in 14 games as a backup in his true freshman year at Alabama during the 2021 season. The following year, he became the team's starting right tackle, and played all 13 games for both the 2022 season and 2023 season. He was named a first team All-Southeastern Conference (SEC) and second-team All-American for his junior year. He declared for the 2024 NFL draft following the 2023 season.

== Professional career ==
Pre-draft measurables
Height	Weight	Arm length	Hand span	Wingspan
6 ft 5 3/4 in (1.97 m)	342 lb (155 kg)	35 1/8 in (0.89 m)	11 in (0.28 m)	7 ft 0 3/8 in (2.14 m)
All values from NFL Combine

Latham was selected by the Tennessee Titans seventh overall in the 2024 NFL draft. He became the Titans' starting left tackle for the 2024 season, switching from the right tackle position in college. Latham started all 17 games of his rookie season. He played on every offensive snap and made three fumble recoveries.

During the 2025 training camp, the Titans announced that Latham would switch to the right tackle position with free agent acquisition, Dan Moore, taking over at left tackle.

Prior to the 2026 training camp, Latham was placed on the physically unable to perform (PUP) list. He was activated off of the list a week later on July 30.

On October 15, 2026, Latham and Jordan Elliott got into a practice altercation at the team facility, and Elliot responded by trying to retrieve a gun from his car.

== Personal life ==
Latham gave himself the nickname of "Trench King".
