= Buford High School (Georgia) =

Location
- 2455 Buford Highway NE; Buford, Georgia 30518; United States; 34.1181875°N 83.9893125°W

Information
- School type: Public high school
- Motto: AAA Excellence: Excellence in Academics, Athletics, and the Arts
- Established: 1948
- School district: Buford City Schools
- Principal: Marty Bozoian
- Teaching staff: 110.20 (FTE)
- Grades: 9-12
- Enrollment: 1,923 (2023-2024)
- Student to teacher ratio: 17.45
- Colors: Kelly green, Vegas gold, and white
- Athletics: Air riflery, baseball, basketball, bass fishing, cheerleading, cross country, dance, football, golf, gymnastics, lacrosse, soccer, softball, swimming & diving, tennis, track & field, volleyball, wrestling
- Athletics conference: Georgia High School Association
- Nickname: Wolves
- Website: bufordhs.org

Buford High School is a public, four-year, comprehensive high school located in Buford, Georgia, United States, in the Gwinnett area of Northside Atlanta.

== History ==
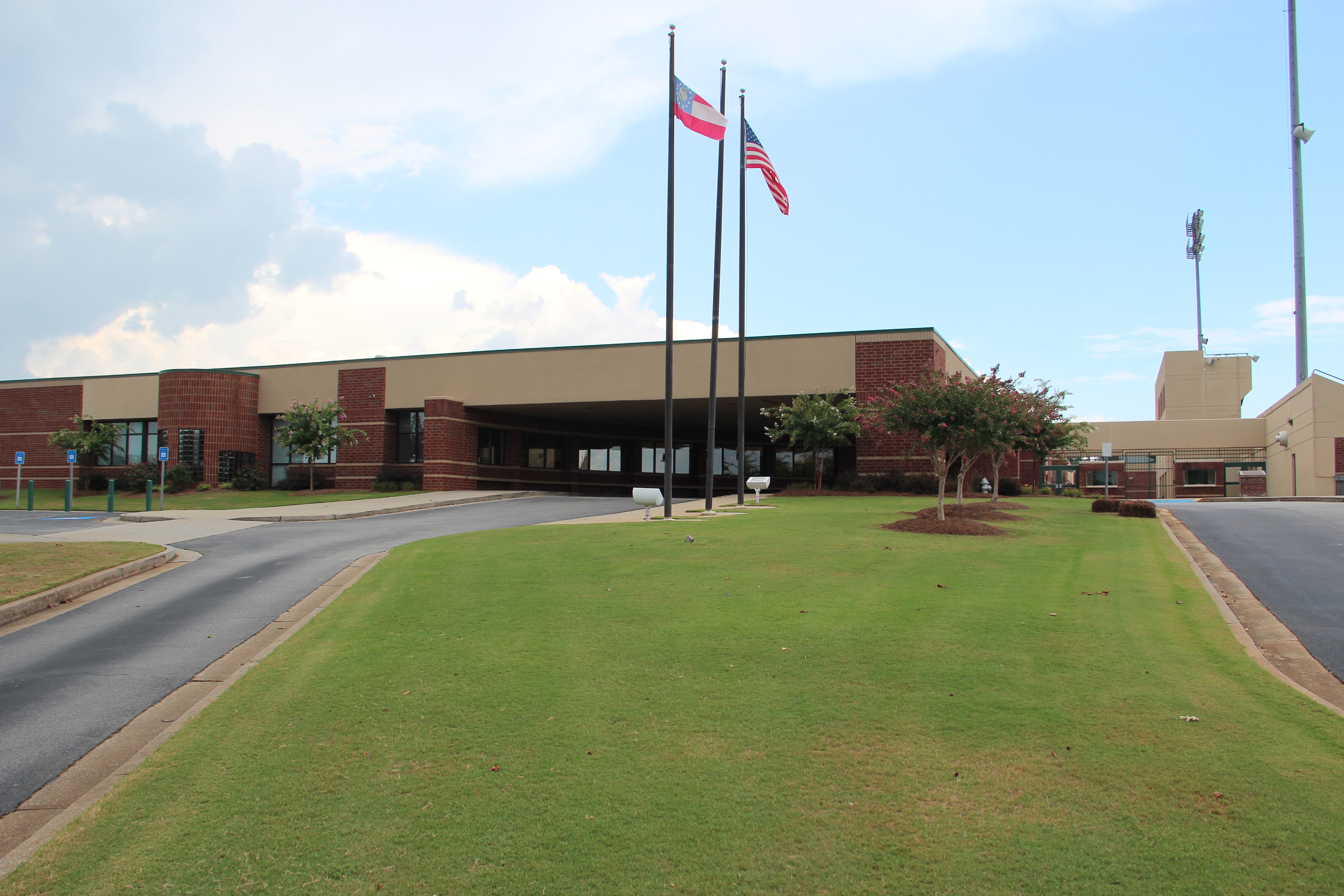
The old Buford High School, now the Middle School

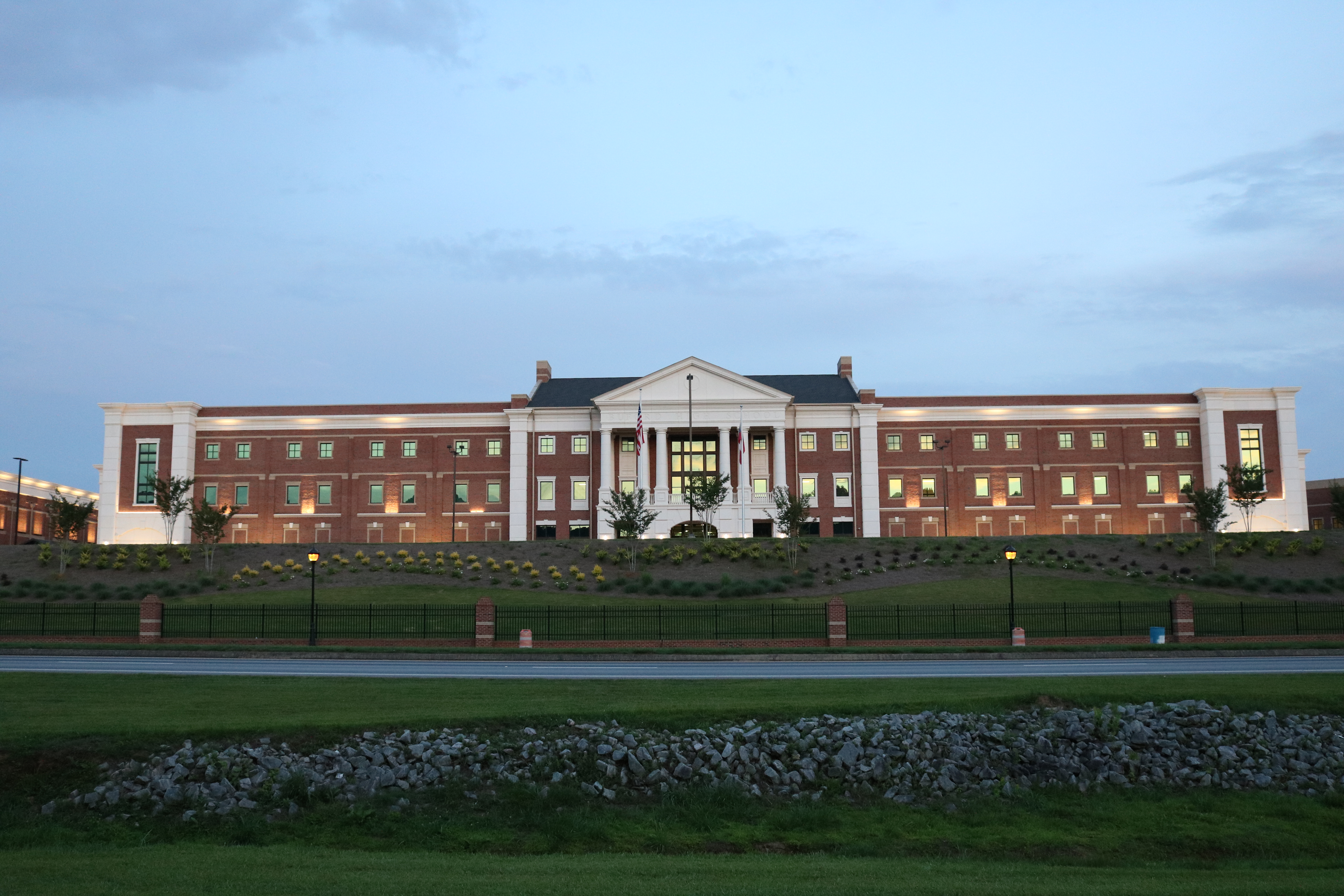
The new Buford High School Academic Building

Buford High School was opened in 1948.

In 2009, it was awarded a silver award by the State of Georgia Governor's Office of Achievement for "Highest Percentage of Students Meeting and Exceeding Standards".

== Academics ==
For the 2010-2011 school year, the school had the highest passing rate in the Georgia High School Graduation Test, with 96% passing. Buford also ranks in the top 6% of students who pass AP courses. A part of the greater Buford City Schools System, Buford was ranked by reviewers on the review site Niche as the top school system in the state.

== Athletics ==
Buford has won state championships in the following:

- Baseball (1977, 2011, 2015)
- Boys' basketball (2017, 2019)
- Girls' basketball (2009, 2010, 2011, 2015, 2017, 2018, 2019, 2020)
- Football (1978, 2001, 2002, 2003, 2007, 2008, 2009, 2010, 2012, 2013, 2014, 2019, 2020, 2021, 2025)
- Gymnastics (2014, 2015, 2016, 2022)
- Softball (2007, 2008, 2009, 2010, 2011, 2012, 2013, 2014, 2015, 2016, 2022, 2023, 2025)
- Volleyball (2015, 2016, 2020, 2021, 2022)
- Wrestling, traditional (2014, 2017, 2018, 2021, 2022)
- Wrestling, duals (2014, 2018, 2021, 2022)
- Girls' track (2017, 2018, 2019)

=== Phillip Beard Stadium ===
Phillip Beard Stadium is a multi-use stadium with a seating capacity of 10,000 that opened in 2025 at a cost of $62 million. The stadium is owned and operated by the City of Buford and used by Buford High School's football team.

== Arts ==
The literary team has won seventeen Georgia High School Association State Literary Championships (1976, 1980, 1982, 1985, 2005, 2007, 2009, 2010, 2011, 2012, 2013, 2014, 2015, 2016, 2017, 2018, 2019, 2020, 2021, 2022). The theater program, competing in the Georgia High School Association One-Act Play, has won four state championships (2011, 2013, 2016, 2018).

== Notable alumni ==
- Vadal Alexander, former NFL football player
- Joey Bart, MLB baseball player
- KJ Bolden, college football safety
- Isaiah Bond, NFL football wide receiver
- Carolyn Calzada, soccer player
- Andraya Carter, sports journalist and former college basketball player
- Sam Clay, MLB baseball player
- Ashton Daniels, college football quarterback
- Kaela Davis, former WNBA basketball player
- Blake Ferguson, NFL football player
- Reid Ferguson, NFL football player
- Eddrick Houston, college football defensive tackle
- Storm Johnson, former NFL football player
- Brandon Marsh, MLB baseball player
- Seth McLaughlin, NFL football player
- Isaac Nauta, NFL football player
- VJ Payne, college football safety
- Dylan Raiola, college football quarterback
- Justin Roper, college football coach and former AFL football player
- Lorne Sam, former NFL football player
- P. K. Sam, former CFL and NFL football player
- Christi Thomas, former WNBA basketball player
- Darius Walker, former NFL football player
- Tim Wansley, former NFL football player
