= Wilkin Formby =

American football player (born 2005)

No. 75 – Texas A&M Aggies
- Position: Offensive tackle
- Class: Redshirt Junior

Personal information
- Born: February 25, 2005 (age 21)
- Listed height: 6 ft 7 in (2.01 m)
- Listed weight: 295 lb (134 kg)

Career information
- High school: Northridge (Tuscaloosa, Alabama)
- College: Alabama (2023–2025); Texas A&M (2026–present)
- Stats at ESPN

Wilkin Formby (born February 25, 2005) is an American college football offensive tackle for the Texas A&M Aggies. He previously played for the Alabama Crimson Tide.

== Early life ==
Formby attended Northridge High School located in Tuscaloosa, Alabama. Coming out of high school, he was rated as a four-star recruit, the top player in Alabama, and the 73rd overall player in the class of 2023. Ultimately, Formby committed to play college football for the Alabama Crimson Tide over offers from other school such as Ole Miss, Oklahoma, LSU, and Tennessee.

== College career ==
As a freshman in 2023, Formby played three games and was redshirted. He made his first collegiate start in the 2024 season opener, a win over Western Kentucky. In week 2, Formby allowed five pressures and racked up four penalties in the win over South Florida, resulting in him being benched for the remainder of the season. During the 2024 season, he played in eight games while making two starts. Heading into the 2025 season, Formby is expected to be the Crimson Tide's starting right tackle.
