= Kneeland Hibbett =

American football player (born 2002)

Profile
- Position: Long snapper

Personal information
- Born: August 1, 2002 (age 24); Florence, Alabama, U.S.
- Listed height: 6 ft 2 in (1.88 m)
- Listed weight: 240 lb (109 kg)

Career information
- High school: Florence (Florence, Alabama)
- College: Alabama (2021–2024)
- NFL draft: 2025: undrafted

Career history
- Miami Dolphins (2025)*
- * Offseason or practice squad member only

Awards and highlights
- First team All-SEC (2023)

Kneeland Hibbett (born August 1, 2002) is an American professional football long snapper. He played college football for the Alabama Crimson Tide and signed with the Miami Dolphins as an undrafted free agent in 2025.

== Early life ==
Hibbett is from Florence, Alabama. His grandfather, Dennis Homan, played in the NFL and was a first-round NFL draft selection. He played football growing up and started playing as a long snapper in seventh grade. He attended Florence High School where he played as a long snapper and once caught a touchdown pass.

After high school, Hibbett walked-on to play college football for the Alabama Crimson Tide in 2021. He won the team's starting long snapper job as a freshman that year. He appeared in all 15 games in 2021, started all 13 games in 2022, started all 14 games in 2023, and started all 13 games as a senior in 2024, recording 55 games played across his collegiate career. As a sophomore, he recovered a fumble in the 2022 Iron Bowl, and in 2023, he recorded one tackle and was named first-team All-Southeastern Conference (SEC). He was on the watchlist for the Patrick Mannelly Award, given to the nation's top long snapper, in 2023, and in 2024 was a semifinalist for the award. Prior to his senior year, he was put on scholarship. While at Alabama, he also operated a TikTok account with over 250,000 followers and donated some of his name, image, and likeness (NIL) money towards chronic traumatic encephalopathy (CTE) research.

== Professional career ==
After going unselected in the 2025 NFL draft, Hibbett signed with the Miami Dolphins as an undrafted free agent, but was waived on May 9, 2025.
