= Elijah Pritchett =

American football player

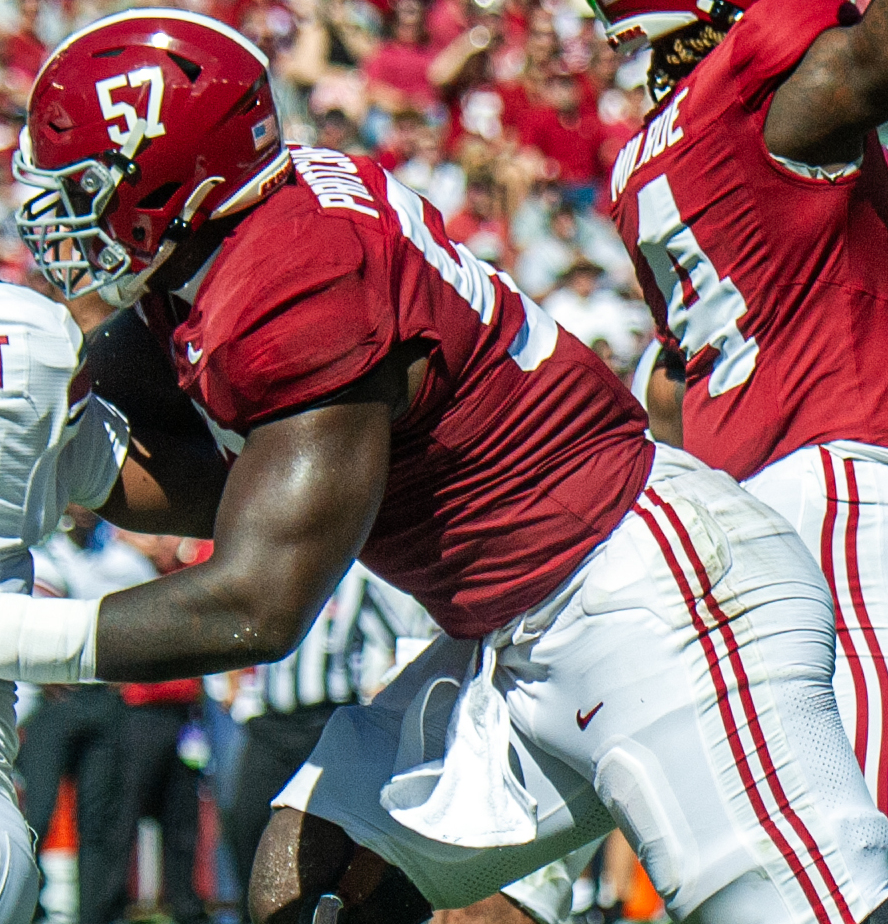
- Pritchett in 2024

No. 57 – Nebraska Cornhuskers
- Position: Offensive tackle
- Class: Junior

Personal information
- Listed height: 6 ft 6 in (1.98 m)
- Listed weight: 325 lb (147 kg)

Career information
- High school: George Washington Carver (Columbus, Georgia)
- College: Alabama (2022–2024); Nebraska (2025–present)
- Stats at ESPN

Elijah Pritchett is an American college football offensive tackle for the Nebraska Cornhuskers. He previously played for the Alabama Crimson Tide.

== Early life ==
Pritchett is from Columbus, Georgia. He attended George Washington Carver High School where he played football as an offensive lineman and was named first-team all-state and to the Atlanta Journal-Constitution Super 11 team. He participated at the All-American Bowl and was highly recruited. He was a five-star prospect and was ranked a top-50 recruit nationally by multiple publications, with Rivals.com ranking him the 22nd-best prospect in the nation, the third-best recruit from Georgia and the nation's top offensive tackle prospect. He committed to play college football for the Alabama Crimson Tide.

== College career ==
Pritchett redshirted and appeared in two games as a freshman in 2022. The following season, he appeared in all 14 games as a backup, being used at both right tackle and left tackle. He won a starting role as a redshirt sophomore in 2024. He appeared in 13 games during the 2024 season, starting 11 at right tackle and one at left tackle. He helped the Alabama offense rank top 25 nationally and Pritchett was named to the Outland Trophy watchlist during the season. After the season, he entered the NCAA transfer portal and transferred to the Nebraska Cornhuskers.
