= Justin Eboigbe =

American football player (born 2001)

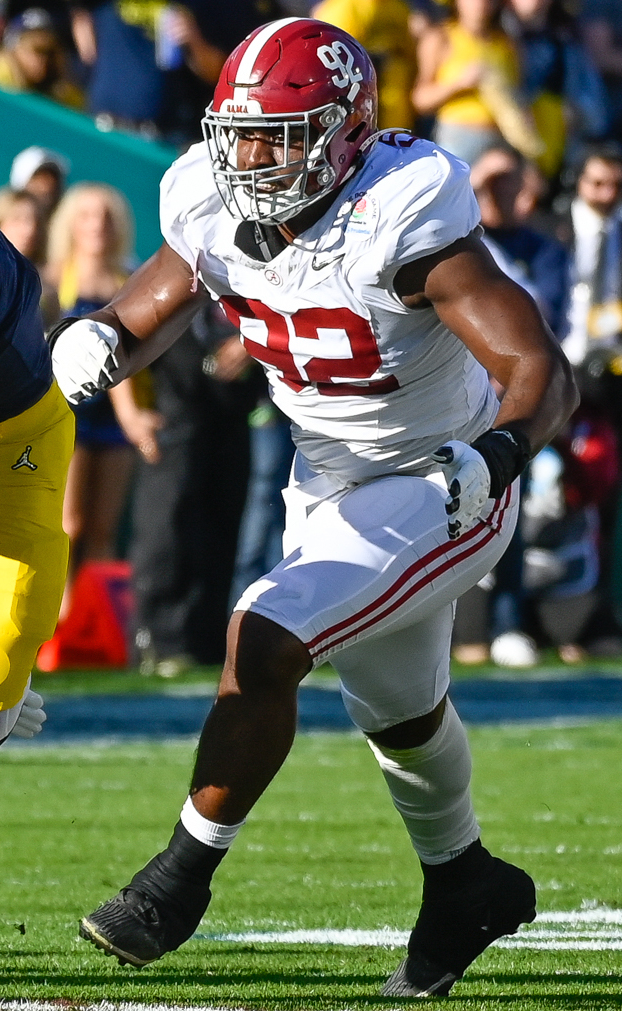
- Eboigbe at the 2024 Rose Bowl

No. 92 – Los Angeles Chargers
- Position: Nose tackle
- Roster status: Active

Personal information
- Born: April 9, 2001 (age 25); Forest Park, Georgia, U.S.
- Listed height: 6 ft 5 in (1.96 m)
- Listed weight: 292 lb (132 kg)

Career information
- High school: Forest Park
- College: Alabama (2019–2023)
- NFL draft: 2024: 4th round, 105th overall pick

Career history
- Los Angeles Chargers (2024–present)

Awards and highlights
- First-team All-SEC (2023)

Career NFL statistics as of Week 5, 2026
- Total tackles: 58
- Sacks: 6.5
- Forced fumbles: 1
- Stats at Pro Football Reference

Justin Eboigbe (born April 9, 2001) is an American professional football nose tackle for the Los Angeles Chargers of the National Football League (NFL). He played college football for the Alabama Crimson Tide.

== Early life ==
Eboigbe attended Forest Park High School in Forest Park, Georgia. He was selected to play in the 2019 Under Armour All-America Game. He committed to the University of Alabama to play college football. Eboigbe is of Nigerian descent.

== College career ==
As a true freshman at Alabama in 2019, Eboigbe played in 10 games with two starts and had 10 tackles and 1.5 sacks. In 2020 he had 19 tackles and an interception in 13 games and in 2021 had 19 tackles and a half sack in 15 games. Eboigbe played in the first four games of the 2022 season, before suffering a season-ending neck injury. He returned from the injury in 2023.

== Professional career ==
Pre-draft measurables
Height	Weight	Arm length	Hand span	Wingspan	40-yard dash	10-yard split	20-yard split	Vertical jump
6 ft 4 3/8 in (1.94 m)	297 lb (135 kg)	33 3/8 in (0.85 m)	9 3/4 in (0.25 m)	6 ft 8 3/4 in (2.05 m)	5.18 s	1.80 s	2.97 s	28.0 in (0.71 m)
All values from NFL Combine

Egoigbe was selected by the Los Angeles Chargers with the 105th overall pick in the fourth round of the 2024 NFL draft.

== NFL career statistics ==
Legend
**Bold**	Career high

=== Regular season ===
Year	Team	Games		Tackles					Interceptions						Fumbles				
Year	Team	GP	GS	Cmb	Solo	Ast	Sck	TFL	Int	Yds	Avg	Lng	TD	PD	FF	Fmb	FR	Yds	TD
2024	LAC	5	0	2	1	1	0.0	0	0	0	0.0	0	0	0	0	0	0	0	0
2025	LAC	17	1	**39**	**27**	**12**	**6.0**	**7**	0	0	0.0	0	0	0	0	0	0	0	0
2026	LAC	5	2	17	8	9	0.5	0	0	0	0.0	0	0	0	1	0	0	0	0
Career		27	3	58	36	22	6.5	7	0	0	0.0	0	0	0	1	0	0	0	0

=== Postseason ===
Year	Team	Games		Tackles					Interceptions						Fumbles				
Year	Team	GP	GS	Cmb	Solo	Ast	Sck	TFL	Int	Yds	Avg	Lng	TD	PD	FF	Fmb	FR	Yds	TD
2025	LAC	1	0	0	0	0	0.0	0	0	0	0.0	0	0	0	0	0	0	0	0
Career		1	0	0	0	0	0.0	0	0	0	0.0	0	0	0	0	0	0	0	0
