= Jase McClellan =

American football player (born 2002)

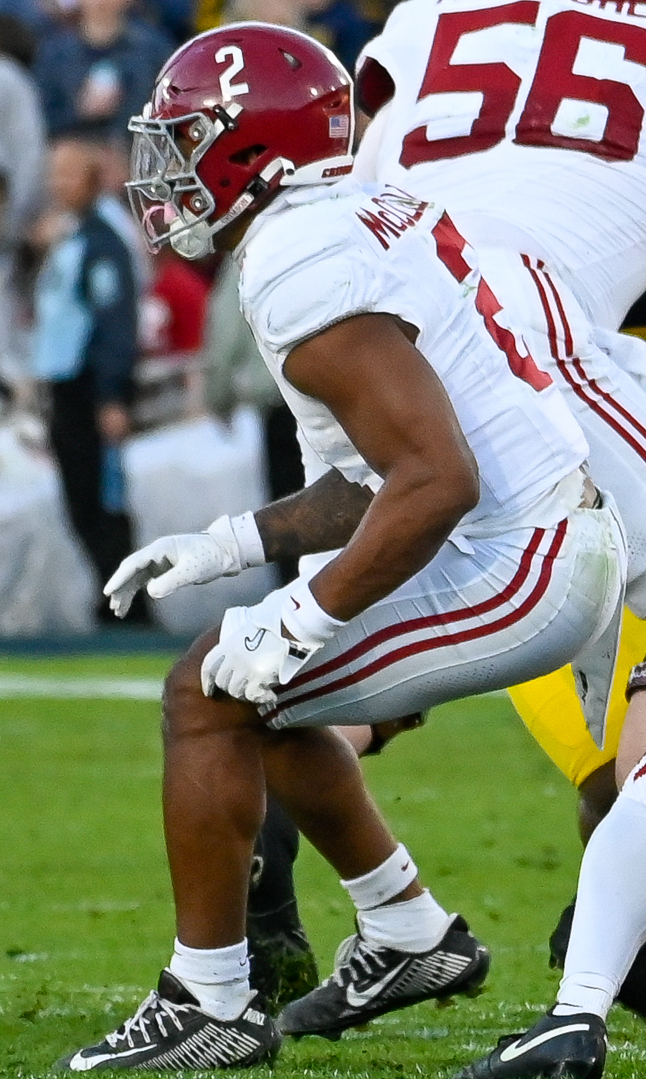
- McClellan with Alabama at the 2024 Rose Bowl

Profile
- Position: Running back

Personal information
- Born: June 25, 2002 (age 24); Aledo, Texas, U.S.
- Listed height: 5 ft 10 in (1.78 m)
- Listed weight: 215 lb (98 kg)

Career information
- High school: Aledo
- College: Alabama (2020–2023)
- NFL draft: 2024: 6th round, 186th overall pick

Career history
- Atlanta Falcons (2024); Tampa Bay Buccaneers (2025)*
- * Offseason or practice squad member only

Awards and highlights
- CFP national champion (2020)

Career NFL statistics
- Rushing yards: 32
- Stats at Pro Football Reference

Jase McClellan (born June 25, 2002) is an American professional football running back. He played college football for the Alabama Crimson Tide and was selected by the Atlanta Falcons in the sixth round of the 2024 NFL draft.

== Early life ==
McClellan attended Aledo High School in Aledo, Texas. During his career, he had 6,468 yards rushing yards and 122 touchdowns. He was selected to play in the 2020 Under Armour All-American Game. He originally committed to the University of Oklahoma to play college football before changing his commitment to the University of Alabama.

== College career ==
As a true freshman at Alabama in 2020, McClellan rushed 23 times for 245 yards and two touchdowns. As a junior in 2021, he played in five games before tearing his ACL, which ended his season. He finished the year with 40 carries for 191 yards and a touchdown. McClellan returned from the ACL injury to start the 2022 season.

== Professional career ==
Pre-draft measurables
Height	Weight	Arm length	Hand span	Wingspan	40-yard dash	10-yard split	20-yard split	Vertical jump	Broad jump	Bench press
5 ft 10 3/8 in (1.79 m)	221 lb (100 kg)	31 1/8 in (0.79 m)	10 1/4 in (0.26 m)	6 ft 3 1/2 in (1.92 m)	4.71 s	1.63 s	2.69 s	30.0 in (0.76 m)	9 ft 5 in (2.87 m)	20 reps
All values from NFL Combine/Pro Day

=== Atlanta Falcons ===
The Atlanta Falcons selected McClellan in the sixth round of the 2024 NFL draft with the 186th overall pick. McClellan signed his rookie scale contract in May 2024.

On June 17, 2025, McClellan was released by the Falcons.

=== Tampa Bay Buccaneers ===
On August 12, 2025, McClellan signed with the Tampa Bay Buccaneers. He was waived on August 26 as part of final roster cuts.

== Career statistics ==
Legend
**Bold**	Career best

=== NFL ===
Year	Team	Games		Rushing					Receiving					Fumbles	
Year	Team	GP	GS	Att	Yds	Avg	Lng	TD	Rec	Yds	Avg	Lng	TD	Fum	Lost
2024	ATL	2	0	13	32	2.5	8	0	0	0	0	0	0	0	0
Career		2	0	13	32	2.5	8	0	0	0	0	0	0	0	0

=== College ===
Year	Team	Games		Rushing				Receiving			
Year	Team	GP	GS	Att	Yards	Avg	TD	Rec	Yards	Avg	TD
2020	Alabama	12	0	23	245	**10.7**	2	1	1	1.0	0
2021	Alabama	5	1	40	191	4.8	1	10	97	9.7	**3**
2022	Alabama	13	4	112	655	5.8	**7**	**14**	**174**	**12.4**	**3**
2023	Alabama	13	12	**166**	**803**	4.8	6	13	126	9.7	0
Career		43	17	341	1,894	5.6	16	38	398	10.5	6
