= Isaiah Bond =

American football player (born 2004)

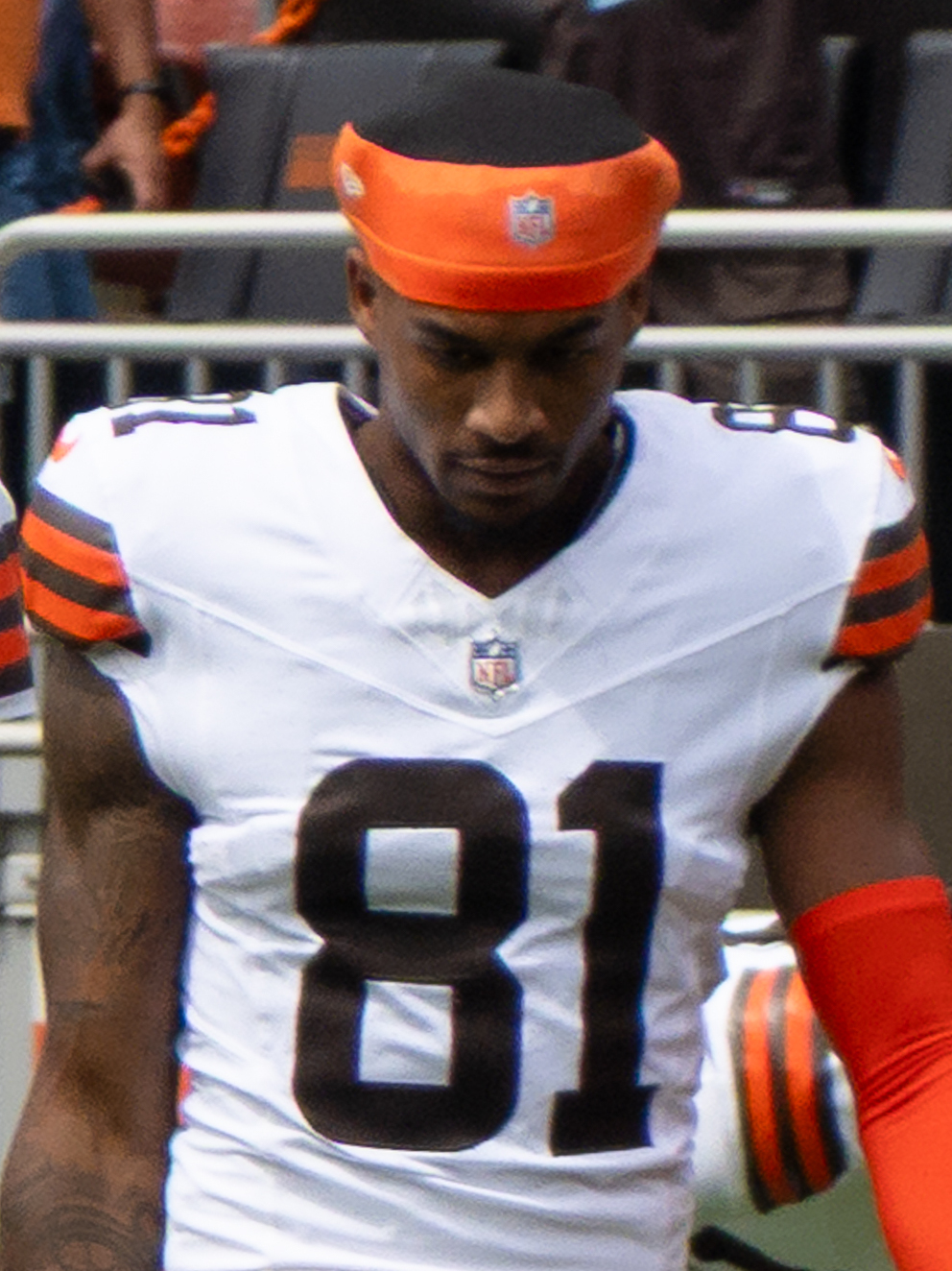
- Bond with the Cleveland Browns in 2025

No. 0 – Cleveland Browns
- Position: Wide receiver
- Roster status: Active

Personal information
- Born: March 15, 2004 (age 22); Hamilton, Georgia, U.S.
- Listed height: 5 ft 11 in (1.80 m)
- Listed weight: 180 lb (82 kg)

Career information
- High school: Buford (Buford, Georgia)
- College: Alabama (2022–2023); Texas (2024)
- NFL draft: 2025: undrafted

Career history
- Cleveland Browns (2025–present)

Career NFL statistics as of Week 9, 2026
- Receptions: 23
- Receiving yards: 424
- Rushing yards: 29
- Return yards: 168
- Stats at Pro Football Reference

Isaiah Bond (born March 15, 2004) is an American professional football wide receiver for the Cleveland Browns of the National Football League (NFL). He played college football for the Texas Longhorns and Alabama Crimson Tide.

== Early life ==
Bond was born on March 15, 2004, and attended Buford High School in Buford, Georgia, where he caught 15 passes for 382 yards and five touchdowns as a junior. As a senior, he had 42 receptions for 909 yards and seven touchdowns, plus five kickoff returns for 107 yards with his longest return of 60 yards. Bond also participated in track and field, winning the Georgia High School Association (GHSA) Class 5A and 6A state championships for three years straight from 2019 to 2021. He won the GHSA Class 6A 100-meter (10.51) and 200-meter (21.19) championships in May 2021 as a junior with a personal best in the 100 meter (10.48) and 200 meter (21.05). Bond committed to play college football at the University of Alabama over Georgia and Florida.

== College career ==
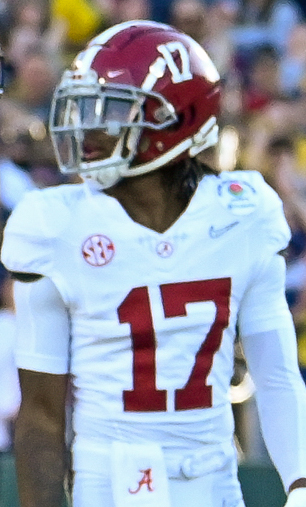
Bond with the Alabama Crimson Tide in 2024

Bond made his collegiate debut the 2022 season opener as a freshman, recording two receptions for 23 yards in a win over Utah State. In week 5, he hauled in two passes for 76 yards, including a 53-yard reception, in a win over Arkansas. In the 2022 Sugar Bowl, Bond hauled in his first career touchdown pass on a six-yard reception, helping Alabama beat Kansas State 45–20. He finished the 2022 season with 17 receptions for 220 yards and a touchdown.

Bond earned a starting role as a sophomore in 2023, finishing the regular season with 39 receptions for 542 yards and four touchdowns. He was most notable for catching a game-winning touchdown on 4th and goal at the 31 yard line against Auburn in the 2023 Iron Bowl. The play dubbed “Grave Digger” and "4th and 31" led to a 27-24 Alabama victory and a bid for the 2023 SEC Championship. Bond completed the season with five receptions for 79 yards in the win against Georgia for the SEC Championship, and four receptions for 47 yards against Michigan in the college playoff to finishing the season with 668 receiving yards. On January 14, 2024, Bond announced that he would be transferring to Texas following the retirement of Nick Saban.

On January 14, 2025, Bond declared for the 2025 NFL draft.

== Professional career ==
Pre-draft measurables
Height	Weight	Arm length	Hand span	Wingspan	40-yard dash	10-yard split	20-yard split	20-yard shuttle	Three-cone drill	Vertical jump
5 ft 10 5/8 in (1.79 m)	180 lb (82 kg)	30 1/2 in (0.77 m)	8 1/2 in (0.22 m)	6 ft 3 1/2 in (1.92 m)	4.35 s	1.52 s	2.57 s	4.48 s	7.21 s	34.0 in (0.86 m)
All values from NFL Combine/Pro Day

Originally projected to go in Day 2, Bond was not selected in the 2025 NFL draft after being accused of sexual assault weeks before. On August 14, 2025, Bond announced that all charges had been dropped and that he intended to sign with the Cleveland Browns. On August 18, he signed a three-year, $3.018 million contract that was fully guaranteed with the Browns.

Bond made his NFL debut on Week 1 against the Cincinnati Bengals, recording one reception for five yards. In Week 3 against the Green Bay Packers, Bond made his first NFL start, recording two receptions for 16 yards. In Week 12, Bond caught a 52-yard pass from rookie quarterback Shedeur Sanders, who was making his first career start against the Las Vegas Raiders.

== Career statistics ==
=== NFL ===
Legend
**Bold**	Career High

==== Regular season ====
Year	Team	Games		Receiving					Rushing					Fumbles	
Year	Team	GP	GS	Rec	Yds	Avg	Lng	TD	Att	Yds	Avg	Lng	TD	Fum	Lost
2025	CLE	16	2	18	338	18.8	52	0	5	29	5.8	9	0	0	0
Career		16	2	18	338	18.8	52	0	5	29	5.8	9	0	0	0

=== College ===
Year	Team	Games	Receiving				Rushing			Punt returns			
Year	Team	Games	Rec	Yds	Avg	TD	Att	Yds	TD	Ret	Yds	Avg	TD
2022	Alabama	13	17	220	12.9	1	0	0	0	**1**	**34**	**34.0**	0
2023	Alabama	**14**	**48**	**668**	13.9	4	1	3	0	**1**	1	1.0	0
2024	Texas	**14**	34	540	**15.9**	**5**	**4**	**98**	**1**	0	0	0.0	0
Career		41	99	1,428	14.4	10	5	101	1	2	35	17.5	0

== Personal life ==
Following an arrest warrant being issued by the Frisco Police Department for sexual assault, Bond turned himself in on April 10, 2025. He was released the same day after posting bail for $25,000. Six days later, Bond's legal representation filed a lawsuit against his accuser for defamation, asking for economic damages and a civil trial, but that lawsuit was dismissed in July 2025.
