= Jaylen Key =

American football player (born 2000)

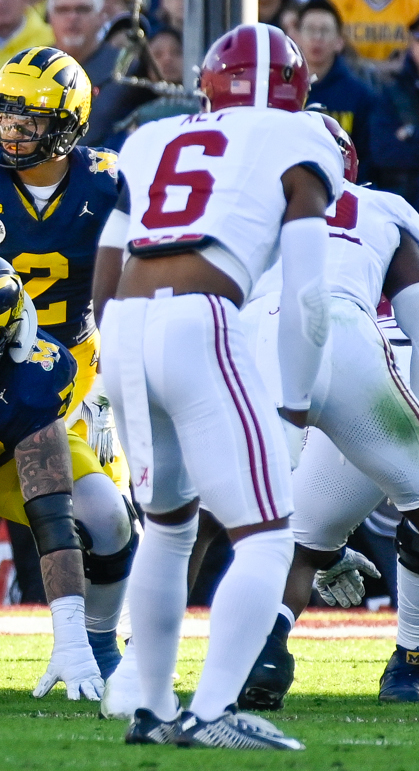
- Key in 2024

Profile
- Position: Safety

Personal information
- Born: February 29, 2000 (age 26); Washington, D.C., U.S.
- Listed height: 6 ft 2 in (1.88 m)
- Listed weight: 210 lb (95 kg)

Career information
- High school: Gadsden County (Havana, Florida)
- College: UAB (2018–2022); Alabama (2023)
- NFL draft: 2024: 7th round, 257th overall pick

Career history
- New York Jets (2024)*; Cincinnati Bengals (2024)*
- * Offseason or practice squad member only
- Stats at Pro Football Reference

Jaylen Key (born February 29, 2000) is an American former professional football safety. He played college football for the UAB Blazers and the Alabama Crimson Tide. He was selected by the New York Jets with the final pick of the 2024 NFL draft, making him that year's Mr. Irrelevant.

== Early life ==
Key grew up in Quincy, Florida and attended Amos P. Godby High School. Coming out of high school, Key was rated as a three-star recruit where he decided to commit to play college football for the UAB Blazers.

== College career ==
=== UAB ===
In Key's first three seasons in 2019, 2020, and 2021, Key notched 18 tackles, a pass deflection, and a fumble recovery. In week thirteen of the 2022 season, Key made 12 tackles versus LSU. During the 2022 season, Key tallied 60 tackles with four and a half being for a loss, three interceptions, and two forced fumbles. For his performance on the 2022 season, Key was named honorable mention all Conference-USA. After the conclusion of the 2022 season, Key decided to enter the NCAA transfer portal.

=== Alabama ===
Key decided to transfer to play for the Alabama Crimson Tide. Coming into the 2023 season, Key won a starting safety spot on the Crimson Tide defense. During week one of the 2023 season, Key snagged an interception in a win over Middle Tennessee. Key finished the 2023 season with 60 tackles with one and a half being for a loss, a pass deflection, and an interception. After the conclusion of the 2023 season, Key decided to declare for the 2024 NFL draft.

== Professional career ==
Pre-draft measurables
Height	Weight	Arm length	Hand span	Wingspan	40-yard dash	10-yard split	20-yard split	20-yard shuttle	Three-cone drill	Vertical jump	Broad jump
6 ft 0 3/4 in (1.85 m)	208 lb (94 kg)	32 1/4 in (0.82 m)	9 5/8 in (0.24 m)	6 ft 6 1/2 in (1.99 m)	4.60 s	1.59 s	2.63 s	4.09 s	7.20 s	36.5 in (0.93 m)	10 ft 10 in (3.30 m)
All values from NFL Combine/Pro Day

=== New York Jets ===
Key was selected by the New York Jets in the seventh round, with the 257th overall pick, of the 2024 NFL draft. He was the final pick of the draft, making him 2024's Mr. Irrelevant. He was waived on August 27, and re-signed to the practice squad. He was released on October 30.

=== Cincinnati Bengals ===
On December 17, 2024, Key was signed to the Cincinnati Bengals practice squad. He signed a reserve/future contract on January 7, 2025.

On August 26, 2025, Key was waived by the Bengals as part of final roster cuts.
