= 2025 Rose Bowl =

College Football Playoff Quarterfinal bowl game

2025 Rose Bowl presented by Prudential
- College Football Playoff Quarterfinal; 111th Rose Bowl Game
Ohio State Buckeyes	Oregon Ducks
(11–2)	(13–0)
Big Ten	Big Ten
41	21
Head coach: Ryan Day	Head coach: Dan Lanning
AP / Coaches / CFP; 6 / 7 / 6	AP / Coaches / CFP; 1 / 1 / 1
	1	2	3	4	Total
Ohio State	14	20	7	0	41
Oregon	0	8	7	6	21
- Date: January 1, 2025
- Season: 2024
- Stadium: Rose Bowl
- Location: Pasadena, California
- Players of the Game: Offense: Jeremiah Smith (WR, Ohio State); Defense: Cody Simon (LB, Ohio State)
- Favorite: Ohio State by 2.5
- Referee: Adam Savoie (ACC)
- Halftime show: Oregon Marching Band; Ohio State University Marching Band
- Attendance: 90,732

United States TV coverage
- Network: ESPN
- Announcers: Chris Fowler (play-by-play); Kirk Herbstreit (analyst); Holly Rowe (sideline); Stormy Buonantony (sideline)
- Nielsen ratings: 22.1 million viewers

The 2025 Rose Bowl was a college football bowl game played on January 1, 2025, at the Rose Bowl in Pasadena, California. The 111th annual Rose Bowl game was one of the 2024–25 College Football Playoff (CFP) quarterfinals and featured top-ranked Oregon and sixth-ranked Ohio State, both members of the Big Ten Conference. This was the first time since the 1944 game in which two teams from the same conference competed in the Rose Bowl. The game began at approximately 2:00 p.m. PST. The Rose Bowl was one of the 2024–25 bowl games concluding the 2024 FBS football season. Sponsored by the Prudential financial service company, the game was officially known as the College Football Playoff Quarterfinal at the 2025 Rose Bowl Game presented by Prudential.

== Background ==
The 2025 Rose Bowl was a quarterfinal game for the 2024–25 College Football Playoff (CFP). Oregon, being the top-ranked team in the final CFP rankings and winner of the Big Ten Championship Game, received a bye in the new 12-team format of the CFP and was selected to play in the bowl game.

Sixth-ranked Ohio State, the number eight seed in the tournament, defeated Tennessee in the first round, 42–17, to advance to this game.

This was the 12th all-time meeting between Ohio State and Oregon, as well as their first post-season meeting since the inaugural 2015 CFP National Championship game in Arlington, which Ohio State won 42–20. It was also their third meeting in the Rose Bowl, following the 1958 and 2010 editions of the bowl from when the game traditionally featured champions of the Big Ten and Pac-12 (or that of their predecessors). The Buckeyes won both times, but the Ducks won the teams' meeting earlier in the 2024 season, a Week 7 game at Autzen Stadium, 32–31.

With the win, Ohio State advanced to the CFP semifinals, facing the winner of the Peach Bowl, Texas, in the Cotton Bowl Classic.

Due to a medical issue, sportswriter Art Spander ended a 70-game streak of attending Pasadena-based playings of the Rose Bowl.

First round			Rose Bowl
			1	Oregon	21
8	Ohio State	42	8	Ohio State	41
9	Tennessee	17

== Teams ==
=== Oregon Ducks ===
This was the ninth Rose Bowl appearance for the Ducks, who entered the game with a 4–4 record in prior appearances. Their most recent prior appearance was the 2020 game, a win over Wisconsin. Oregon entered the game as the Big Ten Conference champions with an 13–0 record (9–0 in conference), their first season in the conference.

=== Ohio State Buckeyes ===
Ohio State was 9–7 in prior Rose Bowl appearances, with their more recent prior appearance coming in the 2022 edition, a three-point victory over Utah. The Buckeyes came into this game with an 11–2 record following their 42–17 first-round win over Tennessee. Ohio State's losses to Oregon and archrival Michigan were by a total of four points.

== Game summary ==
College Football Playoff Quarterfinal at the 2025 Rose Bowl Game

Quarter	1	2	3	4	Total
(8) No. 6 Ohio State	14	20	7	0	41
(1) No. 1 Oregon	0	8	7	6	21

at the Rose Bowl • Pasadena, California

- Date: January 1, 2025
- Game time: 2:12 p.m. PST
- Game weather: Sunny • Temperature: 70 °F (21 °C) • Wind: 6 mph (9.7 km/h) north
- Game attendance: 90,732
- Referee: Adam Savoie
- TV announcers (ESPN): Chris Fowler (play-by-play), Kirk Herbstreit (analyst), Holly Rowe and Stormy Buonantony (sideline reporters)
- Box score

Scoring summary

Quarter	Time	Drive			Team	Scoring information	Score	
Quarter	Time	Plays	Yards	TOP	Team	Scoring information	Ohio State	Oregon
1	14:00	3	75	1:00	Ohio State	Jeremiah Smith 45-yard touchdown reception from Will Howard, Jayden Fielding kick good	7	0
1	7:31	3	53	1:05	Ohio State	Emeka Egbuka 42-yard touchdown reception from Will Howard, Jayden Fielding kick good	14	0
2	14:50	10	63	3:53	Ohio State	46-yard field goal by Jayden Fielding	17	0
2	10:28	2	48	0:43	Ohio State	Jeremiah Smith 43-yard touchdown reception from Will Howard, Jayden Fielding kick good	24	0
2	8:47	1	66	0:12	Ohio State	TreVeyon Henderson 66-yard touchdown run, Jayden Fielding kick good	31	0
2	2:59	10	43	4:50	Ohio State	36-yard field goal by Jayden Fielding	34	0
2	0:00	10	75	2:59	Oregon	Traeshon Holden 5-yard touchdown reception from Dillon Gabriel, 2-point pass to Justius Lowe good	34	8
3	8:55	11	75	6:05	Oregon	Noah Whittington 2-yard touchdown run, Atticus Sappington kick good	34	15
3	2:19	6	56	3:16	Ohio State	TreVeyon Henderson 8-yard touchdown run, Jayden Fielding kick good	41	15
4	10:00	10	51	3:36	Oregon	Traeshon Holden 27-yard touchdown reception from Dillon Gabriel, 2-point run failed	41	21
"TOP" = time of possession. For other American football terms, see Glossary of American football.							41	21

=== Statistics ===
Team statistical comparison
Statistic	Ohio State	Oregon
First downs	20	15
First downs rushing	7	2
First downs passing	12	13
First downs penalty	1	0
Third down efficiency	4–11	8–19
Fourth down efficiency	0–0	2–3
Total plays–net yards	57–500	70–276
Rushing attempts–net yards	31–181	28–-23
Yards per rush	5.8	-0.8
Yards passing	319	299
Pass completions–attempts	17–26	29–42
Interceptions thrown	0	0
Punt returns–total yards	0–0	0–0
Kickoff returns–total yards	1–3	0–0
Punts–average yardage	5–202	8–319
Fumbles–lost	0–0	0–0
Penalties–yards	2–14	3–13
Time of possession	29:05	30:55

Ohio State statistics
Buckeyes passing
	C–A	Yds	TD–INT
Will Howard	17–26	319	3–0
Buckeyes rushing
	Car	Yds	TD
TreVeyon Henderson	8	94	2
Quinshon Judkins	17	85	0
Jeremiah Smith	1	5	0
Will Howard	5	-3	0
Buckeyes receiving
	Rec	Yds	TD
Jeremiah Smith	7	187	2
Emeka Egbuka	5	72	1
Gee Scott Jr.	1	30	0
TreVeyon Henderson	3	20	0
Carnell Tate	1	10	0

Oregon statistics
Ducks passing
	C–A	Yds	TD–INT
Dillon Gabriel	29–41	299	2–0
Ducks rushing
	Car	Yds	TD
Jordan James	7	14	0
Jayden Limar	2	4	0
Noah Whittington	6	3	1
Tez Johnson	1	-1	0
Dillon Gabriel	12	-43	0
Ducks receiving
	Rec	Yds	TD
Traeshon Holden	7	116	2
Terrance Ferguson	5	71	0
Tez Johnson	5	32	0
Noah Whittington	6	30	0
Justius Lowe	2	27	0
Jordan James	2	7	0
Gary Bryant Jr.	1	6	0

== See also ==
- List of college football post-season games that were rematches of regular season games
