= Uiagalelei =

Uiagalelei is a surname. Notable people with the surname include:

- DJ Uiagalelei (born 2001), American football player
- Matayo Uiagalelei (born 2005), American football player
