= 2025 Cotton Bowl Classic (January) =

College Football Playoff Semifinal bowl game

2025 Goodyear Cotton Bowl Classic
- College Football Playoff Semifinal; 89th Cotton Bowl Classic
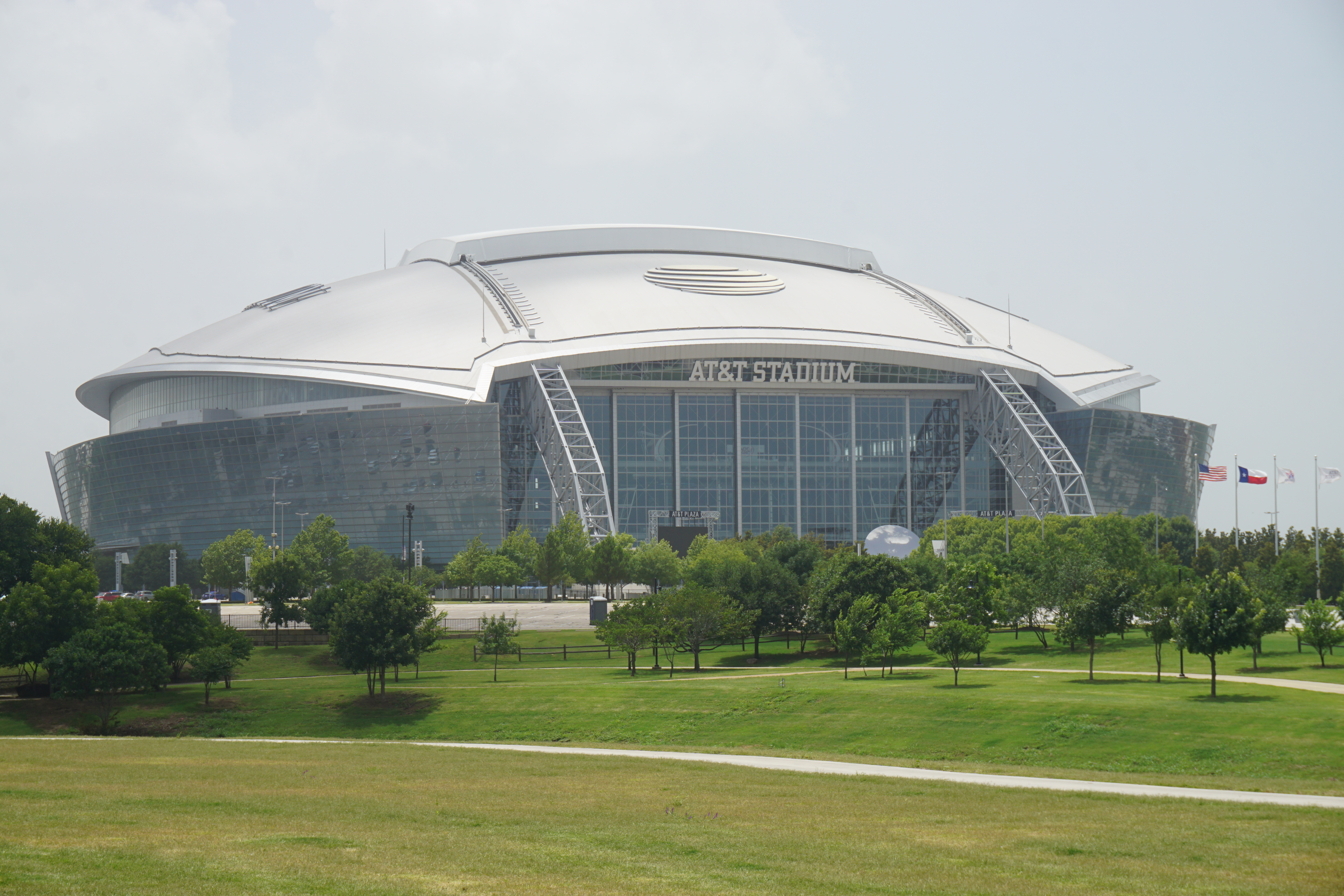
- AT&T Stadium in Arlington, Texas, the site of the Cotton Bowl Classic.
Ohio State Buckeyes	Texas Longhorns
(12–2, .857)	(13–2, .867)
Big Ten	SEC
28	14
Head coach: Ryan Day	Head coach: Steve Sarkisian
AP / Coaches / CFP; 6 / 7 / 6	AP / Coaches / CFP; 4 / 4 / 3
	1	2	3	4	Total
Ohio State	7	7	0	14	28
Texas	0	7	7	0	14
- Date: January 10, 2025
- Season: 2024
- Stadium: AT&T Stadium
- Location: Arlington, Texas
- MOP: Offensive: Will Howard, QB; Defensive: Jack Sawyer, DE
- Favorite: Ohio State by 5.5
- Referee: Jerry Magallanes (ACC)
- Attendance: 74,527

United States TV coverage
- Network: ESPN
- Announcers: Chris Fowler (play-by-play), Kirk Herbstreit (analyst), Holly Rowe and Laura Rutledge (sidelines)

International TV coverage
- Network: ESPN Brazil; ESPN Deportes;
- Announcers: ESPN Brazil: Matheus Pinheiro (play-by-play), Weinny Eirado (analyst) and Guilherme Cohen (rules analyst); ESPN Deportes: Eduardo Varela, Pablo Viruega and Carlos Nava

The 2025 Cotton Bowl Classic was a college football bowl game played on January 10, 2025, at AT&T Stadium in Arlington, Texas. The 89th annual Cotton Bowl Classic featured the Texas Longhorns of the Southeastern Conference (SEC) and the Ohio State Buckeyes of the Big Ten Conference, who both advanced from a College Football Playoff quarterfinal game. The game began at approximately 6:30 p.m. CST and aired on ESPN. The Cotton Bowl Classic was one of the 2024–25 bowl games concluding the 2024 FBS football season. Sponsored by the Goodyear Tire and Rubber Company, the game was officially known as the College Football Playoff Semifinal at the 89th Goodyear Cotton Bowl Classic.

== Background ==
The 2025 Cotton Bowl was a semifinal game of the College Football Playoff (CFP). The game featured the winner of the Rose Bowl, Ohio State, and the winner of the Peach Bowl, Texas. The winner of this game advanced to the 2025 College Football Playoff National Championship game to face Notre Dame, the winner of the Orange Bowl.

At the time of 2024–25 bowl season, Ohio State and Texas were scheduled to play a home-and-home series in 2025 and 2026.

Quarterfinals
Jan 1 – Rose Bowl
1	Oregon	21
8	Ohio State	41
Jan 1 – Peach Bowl
4	Arizona State	31
5	Texas (2OT)	39

Cotton Bowl
8	Ohio State	28
5	Texas	14

== Teams ==
This was the fourth meeting between Ohio State and Texas. Their last was in the 2009 Fiesta Bowl, which Texas won 24-21.

=== Texas Longhorns ===
Texas played to an 11–1 record (7–1 in conference) during the regular season; their only loss was to Georgia in Austin. The Longhorns qualified for the SEC Championship Game, where they lost a rematch to Georgia. Ranked third in the final CFP poll, the Longhorns received the fifth seed in the playoff tournament. Texas beat 12th-seeded and ACC champion Clemson 38–24 in a first-round game in Austin to advance to the Peach Bowl. In the Peach Bowl, they defeated 4th-seeded and Big 12 champion Arizona State 39–31 in double overtime. The Longhorns entered the Cotton Bowl Classic with an overall 13–2 record.

This was Texas' twenty-second appearance in the Cotton Bowl Classic; this bowl was the Longhorn's first appearance in an in-state New Year's Six bowl, BCS Championship, or CFP Championship game since the 2003 Cotton Bowl Classic against LSU.

=== Ohio State Buckeyes ===
Ohio State played to a 10–2 record (7–2 in conference) during the regular season; their only losses were to Oregon in Eugene and Michigan in Columbus. These two losses resulted in the Buckeyes to not qualify for the Big Ten Championship Game. Ranked sixth in the final CFP poll, the Buckeyes received the eighth seed in the playoff tournament. Ohio State beat 9th-ranked Tennessee, 42–17, in a first-round game in Columbus to advance to the Rose Bowl. In the Rose Bowl, they defeated the number one seed and Big Ten champion, Oregon, 41–21. The Buckeyes entered the Cotton Bowl Classic with an overall 12–2 record.

This was Ohio State's fourth appearance in the Cotton Bowl Classic; the Buckeyes had a record of 2–1 of their prior Cotton Bowls, where they won the January 1987 edition and the December 2017 edition. Their loss was the December 2023 edition, where they lost to Missouri, 14-3. This is Ohio State's first back-to-back appearances in the Cotton Bowl Classic.

== Game summary ==
2025 Goodyear Cotton Bowl Classic

Quarter	1	2	3	4	Total
(8) No. 6 Ohio State	7	7	0	14	28
(5) No. 3 Texas	0	7	7	0	14

at AT&T Stadium • Arlington, Texas

- Date: Friday, January 10, 2025
- Game time: 6:45 p.m. CST
- Game weather: Indoor
- Game attendance: 74,527
- Referee: Jerry Magallanes
- TV announcers (ESPN): Chris Fowler (play-by-play), Kirk Herbstreit (analyst), Holly Rowe and Laura Rutledge (sidelines)
- Box score

Scoring summary

Quarter	Time	Drive			Team	Scoring information	Score	
Quarter	Time	Plays	Yards	TOP	Team	Scoring information	Ohio State	Texas
1	7:24	10	64	4:18	Ohio State	Quinshon Judkins 9-yard touchdown run, Jayden Fielding kick good	7	0
2	0:29	7	59	1:23	Texas	Jaydon Blue 18-yard touchdown reception from Quinn Ewers, Will Stone kick good	7	7
2	0:13	1	75	0:16	Ohio State	TreVeyon Henderson 75-yard touchdown reception from Will Howard, Jayden Fielding kick good	14	7
3	3:12	12	67	5:18	Texas	Jaydon Blue 26-yard touchdown reception from Quinn Ewers, Will Stone kick good	14	14
4	7:02	13	88	7:45	Ohio State	Quinshon Judkins 1-yard touchdown run, Jayden Fielding kick good	21	14
4	2:13	10	58	4:49	Ohio State	Jack Sawyer 83-yard fumble return, Jayden Fielding kick good	28	14
"TOP" = time of possession. For other American football terms, see Glossary of American football.							28	14

=== Statistics ===
Team statistical comparison
Statistic	Ohio State	Texas
First downs	18	21
First downs rushing	5	7
First downs passing	12	10
First downs penalty	1	4
Third down efficiency	3–10	5–15
Fourth down efficiency	1–1	1–3
Total plays–net yards	57–370	68–341
Rushing attempts–net yards	24–81	29–58
Yards per rush	3.4	2
Yards passing	8.8	7.3
Pass completions–attempts	24–33	23–39
Interceptions thrown	1	1
Punt returns–total yards	1–1	2–16
Kickoff returns–total yards	0–0	0–0
Punts–average yardage	6–42.0	6–43.8
Fumbles–lost	1–0	3–1
Penalties–yards	9–75	5–54
Time of possession	31:38	28:22

Ohio State statistics
Buckeyes passing
	C–A	Yds	TD–INT
Will Howard	24–33	289	1–1
Buckeyes rushing
	Car	Yds	TD
TreVeyon Henderson	6	42	0
Quinshon Judkins	9	36	2
Will Howard	7	23	0
Emeka Egbuka	1	0	0
Buckeyes receiving
	Rec	Yds	TD
Carnell Tate	7	87	0
Emeka Egbuka	5	51	0
Gee Scott Jr.	5	30	0
Quinshon Judkins	3	22	0
Will Kacmarek	2	21	0
TreVeyon Henderson	1	75	1
Jeremiah Smith	1	3	0

Texas statistics
Longhorns passing
	C–A	Yds	TD–INT
Quinn Ewers	23–39	283	2–1
Longhorns rushing
	Car	Yds	TD
Quintrevion Wisner	17	46	0
Jaydon Blue	4	16	0
Arch Manning	1	8	0
Ryan Wingo	1	6	0
Jerrick Gibson	1	0	0
Quinn Ewers	5	-18	0
Longhorns receiving
	Rec	Yds	TD
Quintrevion Wisner	6	42	0
Jaydon Blue	5	59	2
DeAndre Moore Jr.	4	31	0
Matthew Golden	2	51	0
Gunnar Helm	2	42	0
Silas Bolden	1	24	0
Ryan Wingo	1	22	0
Isaiah Bond	1	8	0
Juan Davis	1	4	0
