= 2024 Oregon Ducks football team =

American college football season

2024 Oregon Ducks football

National champion (Anderson & Hester, Wolfe Ratings) Big Ten champion

Big Ten Championship Game, W 45–37 vs. Penn State

Rose Bowl (CFP Quarterfinal), L 21–41 vs. Ohio State
- Conference: Big Ten Conference

Ranking
- Coaches: No. 4
- AP: No. 3
- Record: 13–1 (9–0 Big Ten)
- Head coach: Dan Lanning (3rd season)
- Offensive coordinator: Will Stein (2nd season)
- Co-offensive coordinator: Junior Adams (3rd season)
- Offensive scheme: Spread option
- Defensive coordinator: Tosh Lupoi (3rd season)
- Co-defensive coordinator: Chris Hampton (2nd season)
- Base defense: 4–3 or 4–2–5
- Home stadium: Autzen Stadium

Uniform

2024 Big Ten Conference football standings
	Conf.			Overall
Team	W		L	W		L
No. 3 Oregon y$^	9	–	0	13	–	1
No. 10 Indiana ^	8	–	1	11	–	2
No. 5 Penn State y^	8	–	1	13	–	3
No. 1 Ohio State #^	7	–	2	14	–	2
No. 16 Illinois	6	–	3	10	–	3
Iowa	6	–	3	8	–	5
Michigan	5	–	4	8	–	5
Minnesota	5	–	4	8	–	5
USC	4	–	5	7	–	6
Rutgers	4	–	5	7	–	6
Washington	4	–	5	6	–	7
Nebraska	3	–	6	7	–	6
UCLA	3	–	6	5	–	7
Wisconsin	3	–	6	5	–	7
Northwestern	2	–	7	4	–	8
Maryland	1	–	8	4	–	8
Michigan State†	0	–	6	0	–	7
Purdue	0	–	9	1	–	11
Championship: Oregon 45, Penn State 37
# – College Football Playoff champion; ^ – College Football Playoff participant; $ – Conference champion; y – Championship game participant; † — NCAA vacated all wins for Michigan State (5–7, 3–6); Rankings from AP Poll

The 2024 Oregon Ducks football team represented the University of Oregon as a member of the Big Ten Conference during the 2024 NCAA Division I FBS football season. The Ducks were led by third-year head coach Dan Lanning and they played their home games at Autzen Stadium located in Eugene, Oregon.

This was the Ducks' first season in the Big Ten. Following a 35–0 road win against Purdue, the Ducks started 7–0 for the first time since 2013. The Ducks achieved their first undefeated regular season since 2010 following a 49–21 win against rival Washington. It also marked the first time in program history that the Ducks reached a 13–0 record, following their first ever Big Ten championship in which they defeated the Penn State Nittany Lions 45–37. The Ducks' season ended with a loss in the Rose Bowl to the eventual national champion Ohio State Buckeyes, 41–21.

Despite the loss in the College Football Playoff, the Ducks were named the national champions by Wolfe Ratings and Anderson & Hester, both being major NCAA selectors. However, the program does not officially claim the championship. The Ducks finished the 2024 season ranked 3rd in the AP Poll and 4th in the Coaches Poll, and Ohio State won the College Football Playoff and consensus national championship.

== Offseason ==
=== 2024 NFL draft ===
Round	Pick	Player	Position	Team
1	12	Bo Nix	QB	Denver Broncos
2	44	Jackson Powers-Johnson	C	Las Vegas Raiders
4	102	Troy Franklin	WR	Denver Broncos
4	108	Khyree Jackson	CB	Minnesota Vikings
4	109	Brandon Dorlus	DT	Atlanta Falcons
4	111	Evan Williams	S	Green Bay Packers
4	125	Bucky Irving	RB	Tampa Bay Buccaneers
6	188	Jamal Hill	LB	Houston Texans

==== Undrafted NFL free agents ====
Player	Position	Team
Popo Aumavae	DT	Carolina Panthers
Casey Rogers	DT	New York Giants
Taki Taimani	DT	Minnesota Vikings
Steven Jones	OL	Jacksonville Jaguars

=== Transfer portal ===
Departing transfers
Name	No.	Pos.	Height	Weight	Year	Hometown	New school
Kris Hutson	#1	WR	5'10.5	170	Junior	Compton, CA	Washington State
Jaden Navarrette	#9	LB	6'3	235	Redshirt Sophomore	Norco, CA	UNLV
Trikweze Bridges	#11	S	6'3	175	Junior	Lanett, AL	Florida
Daymon David	#12	S	6'1	178	Junior	Baltimore, MD	Akron
Bryan Addison	#13	CB	6'5	180	Senior	Gardena, CA	UCLA
Ty Thompson	#13	QB	6'4	215	Redshirt Sophomore	Gilbert, AZ	Tulane
Cole Martin	#21	DB	5'8	175	Freshman	Chandler, AZ	Arizona State
Dante Dowdell	#24	RB	6'1	208	Freshman	Picayune, MS	Nebraska
Tevita Pome'e	#59	DL	6'1.5	310	Freshman	Nuku'alofa, Tonga	Oregon State
Ashton Cozart	#80	WR	6'2.5	182	Freshman	Flower Mound, TX	SMU
Casey Kelly	#81	TE	6'4	220	Redshirt Junior	Buffalo, NY	East Carolina
Josh Delgado	#83	WR	5'11	181	Redshirt Junior	Carson, CA	TBD
Jake Shipley	#90	DL	6'4	269	Junior	Indio, CA	North Texas

Incoming transfers
Name	No.	Pos.	Height	Weight	Year	Hometown	Prev. school
Jabbar Muhammad	#1	CB	5'10	183	Junior	DeSoto, TX	Washington
Evan Stewart	#1	WR	6'0	175	Sophomore	Memphis, TN	Texas A&M
Kobe Savage	#2	S	5'10	205	Senior	Paris, TX	Kansas State
Dante Moore	#3	QB	6'2.5	202	Freshman	Detroit, MI	UCLA
Dillon Gabriel	#8	QB	5'11	186	Redshirt Senior	Mililani, HI	Oklahoma
Kam Alexander	#18	CB	5'11	175	Junior	Houston, TX	UTSA
Jay Harris	#22	RB	6'2	215	Sophomore	St. Louis, MO	Northwest Missouri State
Brandon Johnson	#30	CB	5'10	170	Junior	Newton, NC	Duke
Atticus Sappington	#36	K	5'10	188	Redshirt Sophomore	Portland, OR	Oregon State
Derrick Harmon	#41	DT	6'5	320	Redshirt Junior	Detroit, MI	Michigan State
Matthew Bedford	#76	IOL	6'6	307	Redshirt Senior	Memphis, TN	Indiana
Ja'Maree Caldwell	#93	DL	6'4	315	Senior	Newberry, SC	Houston

== Schedule ==
Date	Time	Opponent	Rank	Site	TV	Result	Attendance
August 31, 2024	4:30 p.m.	No. 7 (FCS) Idaho*	No. 3	Autzen Stadium; Eugene, OR	BTN	W 24–14	57,435
September 7	7:00 p.m.	Boise State*	No. 7	Autzen Stadium; Eugene, OR	Peacock	W 37–34	58,134
September 14	12:30 p.m.	at Oregon State*	No. 9	Reser Stadium; Corvallis, OR (rivalry)	FOX	W 49–14	38,419
September 28	8:00 p.m.	at UCLA	No. 8	Rose Bowl; Pasadena, CA	FOX	W 34–13	43,051
October 4	6:00 p.m.	Michigan State	No. 6	Autzen Stadium; Eugene, OR	FOX	W 31–10	59,802
October 12	4:30 p.m.	No. 2 Ohio State	No. 3	Autzen Stadium; Eugene, OR (College GameDay)	NBC	W 32–31	60,129‡
October 18	5:00 p.m.	at Purdue	No. 2	Ross–Ade Stadium; West Lafayette, IN	FOX	W 35–0	57,463
October 26	12:30 p.m.	No. 20 Illinois	No. 1	Autzen Stadium; Eugene, OR	CBS	W 38–9	59,830
November 2	12:30 p.m.	at Michigan	No. 1	Michigan Stadium; Ann Arbor, MI	CBS	W 38–17	110,576
November 9	4:00 p.m.	Maryland	No. 1	Autzen Stadium; Eugene, OR	BTN	W 39–18	59,245
November 16	4:30 p.m.	at Wisconsin	No. 1	Camp Randall Stadium; Madison, WI	NBC	W 16–13	76,298
November 30	4:30 p.m.	Washington	No. 1	Autzen Stadium; Eugene, OR (rivalry)	NBC	W 49–21	59,603
December 7	5:00 p.m.	vs. No. 3 Penn State*	No. 1	Lucas Oil Stadium; Indianapolis, IN (Big Ten Championship Game)	CBS	W 45–37	67,469
January 1, 2025	2:00 p.m.	vs. (8) No. 6 Ohio State*	(1) No. 1	Rose Bowl; Pasadena, CA (Rose Bowl–CFP Quarterfinal, College GameDay)	ESPN	L 21–41	90,732
*Non-conference game; Rankings from AP Poll (and CFP Rankings, after November 5) - Released prior to game; All times are in Pacific time

‡ – New Autzen Stadium attendance record.

== Rankings ==
Ranking movements Legend: ██ Increase in ranking ██ Decrease in ranking ( ) = First-place votes
	Week																
Poll	Pre	1	2	3	4	5	6	7	8	9	10	11	12	13	14	15	Final
AP	3 (1)	7	9	9	8	6	3	2 (6)	1 (59)	1 (61)	1 (62)	1 (62)	1 (62)	1 (61)	1 (62)	1 (62)	3
Coaches	3	6	6	6	7	6	3	2 (2)	1 (51)	1 (53)	1 (53)	1 (55)	1 (55)	1 (55)	1 (53)	1 (54)	4
CFP	Not released										1	1	1	1	1	1	Not released

== Game summaries ==
=== vs. No. 7 (FCS) Idaho ===
Game One – No. 7 (FCS) Idaho Vandals (0–0) vs No. 3 Oregon Ducks (0–0) – Game summary

Quarter	1	2	3	4	Total
No. 7 Vandals (FCS)	0	0	7	7	14
No. 3 Ducks	7	7	0	10	24

at Autzen Stadium • Eugene, Oregon

- Date: August 31
- Game time: 7:30 p.m. EDT/4:30 p.m. PDT
- Game weather: Sunny • Temperature: 93 °F (34 °C) • Wind: 0 mph N
- Game attendance: 57,435
- Referee: Jim Wharrie
- TV announcers (BTN): Guy Haberman (play-by-play), Yogi Roth (analyst), and Rhett Lewis (sideline reporter)
- GoDucks.com box score

Game information

First quarter

- 8:19 ORE - Tez Johnson 7 Yd pass from Dillon Gabriel (Atticus Sappington Kick) - 7–0 Oregon, Drive: 11 plays, 71 yards, 5:16

Second quarter

- 7:00 ORE - Jordan James 6 Yd Run (Atticus Sappington Kick) - 14–0 Oregon, Drive: 8 plays, 80 yards, 3:24

Third quarter

- 4:15 IDHO - Jake Cox 36 Yd pass from Jack Layne (Cameron Pope Kick) - 14–7 Oregon, Drive: 1 play, 36 yards, 0:07

Fourth quarter

- 12:43 ORE - Atticus Sappington 26 Yd Field Goal - 17–7 Oregon, Drive: 14 plays, 67 yards, 6:32
- 9:45 IDHO - Jack Layne 4 Yd Run (Cameron Pope Kick) - 17–14 Oregon, Drive: 6 plays, 75 yards, 2:58
- 5:36 ORE - Tez Johnson 12 Yd pass from Dillon Gabriel (Atticus Sappington Kick) - 24–14 Oregon, Drive: 10 plays, 75 yards, 4:09

Statistics	IDHO	ORE
First downs	10	31
Total yards	217	487
Rushing yards	49	107
Passing yards	168	380
Passing: Comp–Att–Int	11–27–2	41–50–0
Time of possession	20:45	39:15

Team	Category	Player	Statistics
Idaho	Passing	Jack Layne	11/25, 168 yards, 2 INT
Idaho	Rushing	Elisha Cummings	8 carries, 47 yards
Idaho	Receiving	Mark Hamper	3 receptions, 57 yards
Oregon	Passing	Dillon Gabriel	41/49, 380 yards, 2 TD
Oregon	Rushing	Jordan James	15 carries, 95 yards, 1 TD
Oregon	Receiving	Terrance Ferguson	7 receptions, 87 yards

=== vs Boise State ===
Boise State Broncos (1–0) vs No. 7 Oregon Ducks (1–0) – Game summary

Quarter	1	2	3	4	Total
Broncos	3	17	0	14	34
No. 7 Ducks	7	7	13	10	37

at Autzen Stadium • Eugene, Oregon

- Date: September 7
- Game time: 10:00 p.m. EDT/7:00 p.m. PDT
- Game weather: Cloudy, 82 °F (28 °C)
- Game attendance: 58,134
- Referee: Chris Coyte
- TV announcers (Peacock): Andrew Siciliano (play-by-play), Michael Robinson (analyst), and Laura Britt (sideline)
- GoDucks.com box score

Game information

First quarter

- (9:29) BSU – Jonah Dalmas 42-yard field goal (Drive: 7 plays, 24 yards, 3:07; Boise State 3–0)
- (4:36) ORE – Dillon Gabriel 1-yard run, Atticus Sappington kick (Drive: 3 plays, 72 yards, 0:51; Oregon 7–3)

Second quarter

- (14:20) BSU – Ashton Jeanty 3-yard run, Jonah Dalmas kick (Drive: 9 plays, 75 yards, 5:16; Boise State 10–7)
- (9:28) ORE – Evan Stewart 34-yard pass from Dillon Gabriel, Atticus Sappington kick (Drive: 1 play, 34 yards, 0:07; Oregon 14–10)
- (4:51) BSU – Cameron Camper 17-yard pass from Maddux Madsen, Jonah Dalmas kick (Drive: 3 plays, 30 yards, 1:13; Boise State 17–14)
- (0:02) BSU – Jonah Dalmas 20-yard field goal (Drive: 12 plays, 77 yards, 1:50; Boise State 20–14)

Third quarter

- (9:09) ORE – Traeshon Holden 59-yard pass from Dillon Gabriel (Drive: 5 plays, 88 yards, 3:05; Tied 20–20)
- (3:57) ORE – Tez Johnson 85-yard punt return, Atticus Sappington kick (Oregon 27–20)

Fourth quarter

- (13:09) BSU – Ashton Jeanty 70-yard run, Jonah Dalmas kick (Drive: 1 play, 70 yards, 0:10; Tied 27–27)
- (10:15) BSU – Ashton Jeanty 8-yard run, Jonah Dalmas kick (Drive: 4 plays, 22 yards, 2:01; Boise State 34–27)
- (9:59) ORE – Jayden Limar 0-yard kickoff return, Atticus Sappington kick (Tied 34–34)
- (0:00) ORE – Atticus Sappington 25-yard field goal (Drive: 11 plays, 61 yards, 3:36; Oregon 37–34)

Statistics	BSU	ORE
First downs	19	16
Total yards	73–369	57–352
Rushing yards	33–221	36–109
Passing yards	148	243
Passing: Comp–Att–Int	17–40–0	18–21–0
Time of possession	30:37	29:23

Team	Category	Player	Statistics
Boise State	Passing	Maddux Madsen	17/40, 148 yards, 1 TD
Boise State	Rushing	Ashton Jeanty	25 carries, 192 yards, 3 TD
Boise State	Receiving	Cam Camper	4 receptions, 52 yards, 1 TD
Oregon	Passing	Dillon Gabriel	18/21, 243 yards, 2 TD
Oregon	Rushing	Jordan James	17 carries, 102 yards
Oregon	Receiving	Evan Stewart	5 receptions, 112 yards, 1 TD

=== at Oregon State (rivalry) ===
No. 9 Oregon Ducks (2–0) at Oregon State Beavers (2–0) – Game summary

Quarter	1	2	3	4	Total
No. 9 Ducks	7	15	10	17	49
Beavers	7	7	0	0	14

at Reser Stadium • Corvallis, Oregon

- Date: September 14
- Game time: 3:30 p.m. EDT/12:30 p.m. PDT
- Game weather: Sunny • Temperature: 68 °F (20 °C) • Wind: 4 mph W
- Game attendance: 38,419
- Referee: Mark Kluczunski
- TV announcers (FOX): Jason Benetti (play-by-play), Brock Huard (analyst), and Allison Williams (sideline)
- GoDucks.com box score

Game information

First quarter

- (6:39) ORE – Jordan James 4-yard run, Atticus Sappington kick (Drive: 8 plays, 74 yards, 3:25; Oregon 7–0)
- (0:01) OSU – Anthony Hankerson 6-yard run, Everett Hayes kick (Drive: 13 plays, 75 yards, 6:38; Tied 7–7)

Second quarter

- (13:36) ORE – Dillon Gabriel 54-yard run, Kenyon Sadiq rush (Drive: 4 plays, 75 yards, 1:25; Oregon 15–7)
- (6:43) ORE – Traeshon Holden 20-yard pass from Dillon Gabriel, Atticus Sappington kick (Drive: 8 plays, 84 yards, 3:52; Oregon 22–7)
- (0:15) OSU – Anthony Hankerson 1-yard run, Everett Hayes kick (Drive: 14 plays, 81 yards, 6:22; Oregon 22–14)

Third quarter

- (10:25) ORE – Atticus Sappington 25-yard field goal (Drive: 10 plays, 68 yards, 4:35; Oregon 25–14)
- (4:36) ORE – Jordan James 1-yard run, Atticus Sappington kick (Drive: 9 plays, 75 yards, 3:38; Oregon 32–14)

Fourth quarter

- (14:52) ORE – Noah Whittington 27-yard run, Atticus Sappington kick (Drive: 6 plays, 82 yards, 3:14; Oregon 39–14)
- (10:43) ORE – Jayden Limar 65-yard pass from Dillon Gabriel, Atticus Sappington kick (Drive: 6 plays, 80 yards, 1:42; Oregon 46–14)
- (4:34) ORE – Atticus Sappington 39-yard field goal (Drive: 7 plays, 33 yards, 3:46; Oregon 49–14)

Statistics	ORE	ORST
First downs	26	19
Total yards	59–546	67–309
Rushing yards	32–240	32–131
Passing yards	306	178
Passing: Comp–Att–Int	23–27–0	23–35–0
Time of possession	27:08	32:52

Team	Category	Player	Statistics
Oregon	Passing	Dillon Gabriel	20/24, 291 yards, 2 TD
Oregon	Rushing	Jordan James	12 carries, 86 yards, 2 TD
Oregon	Receiving	Tez Johnson	7 receptions, 110 yards
Oregon State	Passing	Gevani McCoy	22/34, 172 yards
Oregon State	Rushing	Anthony Hankerson	15 carries, 57 yards, 2 TD
Oregon State	Receiving	Trent Walker	8 receptions, 68 yards

=== at UCLA ===
No. 8 Oregon Ducks (3–0) at UCLA Bruins (1–2) – Game summary

Quarter	1	2	3	4	Total
No. 8 Ducks	7	21	0	6	34
Bruins	3	7	3	0	13

at Rose Bowl • Pasadena, California

- Date: September 28
- Game time: 11:00 p.m. EDT/8:00 p.m. PDT
- Game weather: Clear • Temperature: 68 °F (20 °C) • Wind: W 2 mph
- Game attendance: 43,051
- Referee: Ron Snodgrass
- TV announcers (FOX): Connor Onion (play-by-play), Mark Helfrich (analyst), and Josh Sims (sideline)
- GoDucks.com box score

Game information

First quarter

- (9:38) ORE – Traeshon Holden 12-yard pass from Dillon Gabriel, Atticus Sappington kick (Drive: 12 plays, 75 yards, 5:22; Oregon 7–0)
- (2:35) UCLA – Mateen Bhaghani 27-yard field goal (Drive: 12 plays, 66 yards, 7:04; Oregon 7–3)

Second quarter

- (14:55) ORE – Atticus Sappington 41-yard field goal (Drive: 7 plays, 49 yards, 2:31; Oregon 10–3)
- (11:53) ORE – Jordan James 2-yard run, Atticus Sappington kick (Drive: 6 plays, 23 yards, 2:25; Oregon 17–3)
- (9:11) ORE – Tez Johnson 52-yard pass from Dillon Gabriel, Terrance Ferguson pass (Drive: 3 plays, 65 yards, 0:49; Oregon 25–3)
- (2:25) ORE – Atticus Sappington 42-yard field goal (Drive: 11 plays, 46 yards, 4:33; Oregon 28–3)
- (0:04) UCLA – Bryan Addison 96-yard interception, Mateen Bhaghani kick (Oregon 28–10)

Third quarter

- (7:34) UCLA – Mateen Bhaghani 54-yard field goal (Drive: 6 plays, 17 yards, 2:23; Oregon 28–13)

Fourth quarter

- (9:37) ORE – Tez Johnson 12-yard pass from Dillon Gabriel (Drive: 11 plays, 61 yards, 5:23; Oregon 34–13)

Statistics	ORE	UCLA
First downs	27	11
Total yards	78–431	48–172
Rushing yards	36–153	24–47
Passing yards	278	125
Passing: Comp–Att–Int	31–42–1	13–24–2
Time of possession	33:32	26:28

Team	Category	Player	Statistics
Oregon	Passing	Dillon Gabriel	31/41, 278 yards, 3 TD, INT
Oregon	Rushing	Jordan James	20 carries, 103 yards, TD
Oregon	Receiving	Tez Johnson	11 receptions, 121 yards, 2 TD
UCLA	Passing	Ethan Garbers	12/20, 118 yards, 2 INT
UCLA	Rushing	T. J. Harden	13 carries, 53 yards
UCLA	Receiving	Kwazi Gilmer	4 receptions, 31 yards

=== vs Michigan State ===
Michigan State Spartans (3–2) vs No. 6 Oregon Ducks (4–0) – Game summary

Quarter	1	2	3	4	Total
Spartans	0	0	0	10	10
No. 6 Ducks	7	14	3	7	31

at Autzen Stadium • Eugene, Oregon

- Date: October 4
- Game time: 9:00 p.m. EDT/6:00 p.m. PDT
- Game weather: Sunny • Temperature: 60 °F (16 °C) • Wind: NE 6 mph
- Game attendance: 59,802
- Referee: Bryan Banks
- TV announcers (FOX): Jason Benetti (play-by-play), Brock Huard (analyst), and Allison Williams (sideline)
- GoDucks.com box score

Game information

First quarter

- (0:22) ORE – Dillon Gabriel 9-yard run, Atticus Sappington kick (Drive: 7 plays, 75 yards, 3:30; Oregon 7–0)

Second quarter

- (5:26) ORE – Jordan James 3-yard run, Andrew Boyle kick (Drive: 7 plays, 55 yards, 3:45; Oregon 14–0)
- (0:05) ORE – Evan Stewart 9-yard pass from Dillon Gabriel, Atticus Sappington kick (Drive: 12 plays, 73 yards, 1:48; Oregon 21–0)

Third quarter

- (6:47) ORE – Andrew Boyle 50-yard field goal (Drive: 9 plays, 48 yards, 3:48; Oregon 24–0)

Fourth quarter

- (11:18) ORE – Tez Johnson 2-yard pass from Dillon Gabriel, Atticus Sappington kick (Drive: 15 plays, 64 yards, 8:07; Oregon 31–0)
- (8:27) MSU – Kay'Ron Adams-Lynch 1-yard run, Jonathan Kim kick (Drive: 7 plays, 75 yards, 2:51; Oregon 31–7)
- (0:25) MSU – Jonathan Kim 42-yard field goal (Drive: 11 plays, 45 yards, 6:12; Oregon 31–10)

Statistics	MSU	ORE
First downs	16	25
Total yards	52–250	71–477
Rushing yards	30–59	37–213
Passing yards	191	264
Passing: Comp–Att–Int	15–22–0	21–34–2
Time of possession	29:02	30:58

Team	Category	Player	Statistics
Michigan State	Passing	Aidan Chiles	10/17, 154 yards
Michigan State	Rushing	Kay'Ron Lynch-Adams	9 carries, 32 yards, TD
Michigan State	Receiving	Nick Marsh	3 receptions, 58 yards
Oregon	Passing	Dillon Gabriel	20/32, 257 yards, 2 TD, 2 INT
Oregon	Rushing	Jordan James	24 carries, 166 yards, TD
Oregon	Receiving	Tez Johnson	10 receptions, 84 yards, TD

=== vs No. 2 Ohio State ===
No. 2 Ohio State Buckeyes (5–0) vs No. 3 Oregon Ducks (5–0) – Game summary

Quarter	1	2	3	4	Total
No. 2 Buckeyes	7	14	7	3	31
No. 3 Ducks	6	16	0	10	32

at Autzen Stadium • Eugene, Oregon

- Date: October 12
- Game time: 4:30 p.m. PDT
- Game weather: Sunny • Temperature: 77 °F (25 °C) • Wind: NW 3 mph
- Game attendance: 60,129
- Referee: Larry Smith
- TV announcers (NBC): Noah Eagle (play-by-play), Todd Blackledge (analyst), Kathryn Tappen (sideline), and Paul Burmeister (sideline)
- GoDucks.com box score

Game information

First quarter

- (10:00) OSU – Will Howard 1-yard run, Jayden Fielding kick (Drive: 10 plays, 75 yards, 5:00; Ohio State 7–0)
- (5:51) ORE – Jordan James 3-yard run, two-point pass failed (Drive: 2 plays, 28 yards, 0:43; Ohio State 7–6)

Second quarter

- (14:22) OSU – Quinshon Judkins 1-yard run, Jayden Fielding kick (Drive: 4 plays, 74 yards, 1:21; Ohio State 14–6)
- (12:31) ORE – Evan Stewart 10-yard pass from Dillon Gabriel, two-point run failed (Drive: 4 plays, 75 yards, 1:51; Ohio State 14–12)
- (10:09) ORE – Atticus Sappington 27-yard field goal (Drive: 5 plays, 32 yards, 2:17; Oregon 15–14)
- (3:53) OSU – Emeka Egbuka 15-yard pass from Will Howard, Jayden Fielding kick (Drive: 12 plays, 75 yards, 6:16; Ohio State 21–15)
- (1:17) ORE – Tez Johnson 48-yard pass from Dillon Gabriel, Atticus Sappington kick (Drive: 7 plays, 75 yards, 2:36; Oregon 22–21)

Third quarter

- (9:27) OSU – Jeremiah Smith 6-yard pass from Will Howard, Jayden Fielding kick (Drive: 6 plays, 79 yards, 3:08; Ohio State 28–22)

Fourth quarter

- (13:20) ORE – Dillon Gabriel 27-yard run, Andrew Boyle kick (Drive: 5 plays, 60 yards, 1:51; Oregon 29–28)
- (6:00) OSU – Jayden Fielding 40-yard field goal (Drive: 13 plays, 53 yards, 7:20; Ohio State 31–29)
- (1:47) ORE – Atticus Sappington 19-yard field goal (Drive: 11 plays, 74 yards, 4:13; Oregon 32–31)

Statistics	OSU	ORE
First downs	21	18
Total yards	68–467	65–496
Rushing yards	33–141	31–155
Passing yards	326	341
Passing: Comp–Att–Int	28–35–0	23–34–0
Time of possession	33:09	26:51

Team	Category	Player	Statistics
Ohio State	Passing	Will Howard	28/35, 326 yards, 2 TD
Ohio State	Rushing	TreVeyon Henderson	10 carries, 87 yards
Ohio State	Receiving	Jeremiah Smith	9 receptions, 100 yards, TD
Oregon	Passing	Dillon Gabriel	23/34, 341 yards, 2 TD
Oregon	Rushing	Jordan James	23 carries, 115 yards, TD
Oregon	Receiving	Evan Stewart	7 receptions, 149 yards, TD

=== at Purdue ===
No. 2 Oregon Ducks (6–0) at Purdue Boilermakers (1–5) – Game summary

Quarter	1	2	3	4	Total
No. 2 Ducks	14	7	0	14	35
Boilermakers	0	0	0	0	0

at Ross–Ade Stadium • West Lafayette, Indiana

- Date: October 18
- Game time: 8:00 p.m. EDT/5:00 p.m. PDT
- Game weather: Clear
- Game attendance: 57,463
- Referee: Jerry McGinn
- TV announcers (FOX): Tim Brando (play-by-play), Devin Gardner (analyst), and Josh Sims (sideline)
- GoDucks.com box score

Game information

First quarter

- ORE – Jordan James 8-yard run (Atticus Sappington kick), 11:46 Oregon 7–0 Drive: 7 plays, 75 yards, 3:14.
- ORE – Jordan James 1-yard run (Atticus Sappington kick), 3:34 Oregon 14–0 Drive: 11 plays, 80 yards, 4:58.

Second quarter

- ORE – Tez Johnson 12-yard pass from Dillon Gabriel (Atticus Sappington kick), 12:24 Oregon 21–0 Drive: 6 plays, 99 yards, 3:01.

Third quarter

No scoring plays

Fourth quarter

- ORE – Noah Whittington 8-yard pass from Dillon Gabriel (Atticus Sappington kick), 13:47 Oregon 28–0 Drive: 7 plays, 59 yards, 3:43.
- ORE – Jay Harris 12-yard run (Atticus Sappington kick), 8:13 Oregon 35–0 Drive: 8 plays, 55 yards, 4:47.

Statistics	ORE	PUR
First downs	25	16
Total yards	60–421	59–301
Rushing yards	35–131	40–208
Passing yards	290	93
Passing: Comp–Att–Int	21–25–1	9–19–1
Time of possession	29:58	30:02

Team	Category	Player	Statistics
Oregon	Passing	Dillon Gabriel	21/25, 290 yards, 2 TD, 1 INT
Oregon	Rushing	Jordan James	10 carries, 50 yards, 2 TD
Oregon	Receiving	Evan Stewart	4 receptions, 96 yards
Purdue	Passing	Ryan Browne	9/19, 93 yards, 1 INT
Purdue	Rushing	Reggie Love III	11 carries, 93 yards
Purdue	Receiving	Max Klare	3 receptions, 32 yards

=== vs No. 20 Illinois ===
No. 20 Illinois Fighting Illini (6–1) vs No. 1 Oregon Ducks (7–0) – Game summary

Quarter	1	2	3	4	Total
No. 20 Fighting Illini	3	0	6	0	9
No. 1 Ducks	14	21	0	3	38

at Autzen Stadium • Eugene, Oregon

- Date: October 26
- Game time: 12:30 p.m. PDT
- Game weather: Sunny • Temperature: 70 °F (21 °C) • Wind: SW 5 miles per hour (8.0 km/h)
- Game attendance: 59,830
- Referee: Mark Kluczynski
- TV announcers (CBS): Brad Nessler (play-by-play), Gary Danielson (analyst), and Jenny Dell (sideline)
- GoDucks.com box score

Game information

First quarter

- (10:49) ORE – Tez Johnson 31-yard pass from Dillon Gabriel, Atticus Sappington kick (Drive: 9 plays, 83 yards, 4:05; Oregon 7–0)
- (6:05) ORE – Justius Lowe 34-yard pass from Dillon Gabriel, Atticus Sappington kick (Drive: 7 plays, 58 yards, 2:41; Oregon 14–0)
- (1:34) ILL – David Olano 38-yard field goal (Drive: 6 plays, 46 yards, 2:00; Oregon 14–3)

Second quarter

- (12:20) ORE – Dillon Gabriel 7-yard run, Atticus Sappington kick (Drive: 8 plays, 65 yards, 4:14; Oregon 21–3)
- (6:09) ORE – Noah Whittington 18-yard run, Atticus Sappington kick (Drive: 6 plays, 54 yards, 3:13; Oregon 28–3)
- (0:29) ORE – Noah Whittington 2-yard pass from Dillon Gabriel, Atticus Sappington kick (Drive: 8 plays, 89 yards, 2:03; Oregon 35–3)

Third quarter

- (0:46) ILL – Ca'Lil Valentine 4-yard run, two-point run failed (Drive: 16 plays, 95 yards, 6:42; Oregon 35–9)

Fourth quarter

- (9:04) ORE – Andrew Boyle 44-yard field goal (Drive: 7 plays, 40 yards, 3:05. Oregon 38–9)

Statistics	ILL	ORE
First downs	18	27
Total yards	67–293	67–527
Rushing yards	32–132	39–229
Passing yards	161	298
Passing: Comp–Att–Int	17–35–2	20–28–1
Time of possession	28:45	31:15

Team	Category	Player	Statistics
Illinois	Passing	Luke Altmyer	17/35, 162 yards, 2 INT
Illinois	Rushing	Aidan Laughery	12 carries, 69 yards
Illinois	Receiving	Zakhari Franklin	6 receptions, 72 yards
Oregon	Passing	Dillon Gabriel	18/26, 291 yards, 3 TD, 1 INT
Oregon	Rushing	Jordan James	15 carries, 83 yards
Oregon	Receiving	Tez Johnson	6 receptions, 102 yards, 1 TD

=== at Michigan ===
No. 1 Oregon Ducks (8–0) at Michigan Wolverines (5–3) – Game summary

Quarter	1	2	3	4	Total
No. 1 Ducks	7	21	3	7	38
Wolverines	7	3	7	0	17

at Michigan Stadium • Ann Arbor, Michigan

- Date: November 2
- Game time: 12:30 p.m. PDT
- Game weather: 53 °F (12 °C), sunny, S 2 miles per hour (3.2 km/h)
- Game attendance: 110,576
- Referee: Ron Snodgrass
- TV announcers (CBS): Brad Nessler (play-by-play), Gary Danielson (analyst), and Jenny Dell (sideline)
- GoDucks.com box score

Game information

First quarter

- (6:53) Oregon – Evan Stewart 2-yard pass from Dillon Gabriel (Atticus Sappington kick) (Drive: 12 plays, 63 yards, 6:26; Oregon 7–0)
- (1:31) Michigan – Tyler Morris 7-yard pass from Davis Warren (Dominic Zvada kick) (Drive: 5 plays, 28 yards, 3:19; Tied 7–7)

Second quarter

- (14:30) Oregon – Noah Whittington 1-yard run (Atticus Sappington kick) (Drive: 6 plays, 75 yards, 2:01; Oregon 14–7)
- (4:19) Oregon – Noah Whittington 6-yard run (Atticus Sappington kick) (Drive: 10 plays, 94 yards, 4:41; Oregon 21–7)
- (1:51) Michigan – Dominic Zvada 38-yard field goal (Drive: 7 plays, 55 yards, 2:28; Oregon 21–10)
- (0:35) Oregon – Dillon Gabriel 23-yard run (Atticus Sappington kick) (Drive: 7 plays, 80 yards, 1:12; Oregon 28–10)

Third quarter

- (7:09) Michigan – Peyton O'Leary 6-yard pass from Davis Warren (Dominic Zvada kick) (Drive: 10 plays, 75 yards, 6:35; Oregon 28–17)
- (0:36) Oregon – Atticus Sappington 26-yard field goal (Drive: 15 plays, 67 yards, 6:33; Oregon 31–17)

Fourth quarter

- (0:25) Oregon – Jordan James 2-yard run (Atticus Sappington kick) (Drive: 11 plays, 90 yards, 6:59; Oregon 38–17)

Statistics	ORE	MICH
First downs	23	11
Total yards	470	270
Rushing yards	176	105
Passing yards	294	165
Passing: Comp–Att–Int	22–34–0	13–25–0
Time of possession	32:28	27:32

Team	Category	Player	Statistics
Oregon	Passing	Dillon Gabriel	22/34, 294 yards, TD
Oregon	Rushing	Jordan James	23 carries, 117 yards, TD
Oregon	Receiving	Traeshon Holden	6 receptions, 149 yards
Michigan	Passing	Davis Warren	12/21, 164 yards, 2 TD
Michigan	Rushing	Donovan Edwards	10 carries, 52 yards
Michigan	Receiving	Colston Loveland	7 receptions, 112 yards

=== vs Maryland ===
Maryland Terrapins (4–4) vs No. 1 Oregon Ducks (9–0) – Game summary

Quarter	1	2	3	4	Total
Terrapins	3	7	0	8	18
No. 1 Ducks	7	14	8	10	39

at Autzen Stadium • Eugene, Oregon

- Date: November 9
- Game time: 4:00 p.m. PST
- Game weather: Cloudy • Temperature: 58 °F (14 °C) • Wind: NW 1 mile per hour (1.6 km/h)
- Game attendance: 59,245
- Referee: Larry Smith
- TV announcers (BTN): Jeff Levering (play-by-play), Jake Butt (analyst), and Brooke Fletcher (sideline reporter)
- GoDucks.com box score

Game information

First quarter

- (10:17) MAR – Jack Howes 37-yard field goal (Drive: 12 plays, 56 yards, 4:43; Maryland 3–0)
- (2:21) ORE – Jordan James 3-yard run, Atticus Sappington kick (Drive: 14 plays, 92 yards, 5:36; Oregon 7–3)

Second quarter

- (13:10) ORE – Brandon Johnson 62-yard fumble recovery, Atticus Sappington kick (Oregon 14–3)
- (3:17) MAR – Roman Hemby 1-yard run, Jack Howes kick (Drive: 9 plays, 70 yards, 4:25; Oregon 14–10)
- (0:20) ORE – Terrance Ferguson 9-yard pass from Dillon Gabriel, Andrew Boyle kick (Drive: 12 plays, 75 yards, 2:57; Oregon 21–10)

Third quarter

- (7:48) ORE – Gernorris Wilson 3-yard pass from Dillon Gabriel, Josh Conerly Jr. rush (Drive: 8 plays, 85 yards, 3:12; Oregon 29–10)

Fourth quarter

- (11:27) MAR – Octavian Smith Jr. 3-yard pass from Billy Edwards Jr., Billy Edwards Jr. rush (Drive: 10 plays, 59 yards, 4:07; Oregon 29–18)
- (5:47) ORE – Atticus Sappington 20-yard field goal (Drive: 4 plays, 2 yards, 1:59; Oregon 32–18)
- (3:45) ORE – Evan Stewart 17-yard pass from Dillon Gabriel, Andrew Boyle kick (Drive: 5 plays, 32 yards, 1:08; Oregon 39–18)

Statistics	MD	ORE
First downs	19	19
Total yards	289	363
Rushing yards	83	180
Passing yards	206	183
Passing: Comp–Att–Int	22–45–2	23–34–0
Time of possession	32:49	27:11

Team	Category	Player	Statistics
Maryland	Passing	Billy Edwards Jr.	22/44, 206 yards, TD, 2 INT
Maryland	Rushing	Roman Hemby	11 carries, 34 yards, TD
Maryland	Receiving	Tai Felton	7 receptions, 72 yards
Oregon	Passing	Dillon Gabriel	23/34, 183 yards, 3 TD
Oregon	Rushing	Noah Whittington	13 carries, 77 yards
Oregon	Receiving	Evan Stewart	6 receptions, 55 yards, TD

=== at Wisconsin ===
No. 1 Oregon Ducks (10–0) at Wisconsin Badgers (5–4) – Game summary

Quarter	1	2	3	4	Total
No. 1 Ducks	6	0	0	10	16
Badgers	0	10	3	0	13

at Camp Randall Stadium • Madison, Wisconsin

- Date: November 16
- Game time: 4:30 p.m. PST
- Game weather: Cloudy, 47 °F (8 °C); Wind: SE 14 mph
- Game attendance: 76,298
- Referee: Tim O'Dey
- TV announcers (NBC): Noah Eagle (play-by-play), Todd Blackledge (analyst), and Kathryn Tappen (sideline)
- GoDucks.com box score

Game information

First quarter

- ORE – Atticus Sappington 35-yard field goal, 9:01. Oregon 3–0. Drive: 11 plays, 43 yards, 4:36.
- ORE – Atticus Sappington 42-yard field goal, 1:11. Oregon 6–0. Drive: 6 plays, 30 yards, 3:08.

Second quarter

- WIS – Nathanial Vakos 31-yard field goal, 10:19. Oregon 6–3. Drive: 13 plays, 56 yards, 5:52.
- WIS – Will Pauling 2-yard pass from Braedyn Locke (Nathanial Vakos kick), 0:25 Wisconsin 10–6 Drive: 9 plays, 75 yards, 2:40.

Third quarter

- WIS – Nathanial Vakos 35-yard field goal, 4:43. Wisconsin 13–6. Drive: 16 plays, 62 yards, 8:53.

Fourth quarter

- ORE – Jordan James 11-yard run (Atticus Sappington kick), 13:14 Tie 13–13 Drive: 13 plays, 81 yards, 6:24.
- ORE – Atticus Sappington 24-yard field goal, 2:36. Oregon 16–13. Drive: 9 plays, 37 yards, 4:13.

Statistics	ORE	WIS
First downs	19	15
Total yards	354	226
Rushing yards	136	130
Passing yards	218	96
Passing: Comp–Att–Int	22–31–1	12–28–1
Time of possession	32:23	27:37

Team	Category	Player	Statistics
Oregon	Passing	Dillon Gabriel	22/31, 218 yards, INT
Oregon	Rushing	Jordan James	25 carries, 121 yards, TD
Oregon	Receiving	Evan Stewart	10 receptions, 92 yards
Wisconsin	Passing	Braedyn Locke	12/28, 96 yards, TD, INT
Wisconsin	Rushing	Tawee Walker	20 carries, 97 yards
Wisconsin	Receiving	Vinny Anthony II	4 receptions, 53 yards

=== vs Washington (rivalry) ===
Washington Huskies (6–5) vs No. 1 Oregon Ducks (11–0) – Game summary

Quarter	1	2	3	4	Total
Huskies	3	11	0	7	21
No. 1 Ducks	7	21	7	14	49

at Autzen Stadium • Eugene, Oregon

- Date: November 30
- Game time: 4:30 p.m. PST
- Game weather: 37 °F (3 °C), cloudy
- Game attendance: 59,603
- Referee: Jerry McGinn
- TV announcers (NBC): Noah Eagle (play-by-play), Todd Blackledge (analyst), and Kathryn Tappen (sideline)
- GoDucks.com box score

Statistics	WASH	ORE
First downs	17	28
Total yards	244	458
Rushing yards	43	222
Passing yards	201	236
Passing: Comp–Att–Int	17-20-0	19-26-0
Time of possession	32:03	27:57

Team	Category	Player	Statistics
Washington	Passing	Demond Williams Jr.	17/20, 201 yards, TD
Washington	Rushing	Adam Mohammed	4 carries, 23 yards
Washington	Receiving	Giles Jackson	6 receptions, 69 yards, TD
Oregon	Passing	Dillon Gabriel	16/23, 209 yards, 2 TD
Oregon	Rushing	Jordan James	15 carries, 99 yards, 2 TD
Oregon	Receiving	Traeshon Holden	3 receptions, 73 yards

=== vs. Penn State (Big Ten Championship Game) ===
2024 Big Ten Championship Game
No. 3 Penn States Nittany Lions (11–1, 8–1) at No. 1 Oregon Ducks (12–0, 9–0)

Quarter	1	2	3	4	Total
No. 3 Nittany Lions	10	14	0	13	37
No. 1 Ducks	14	17	7	7	45

at Lucas Oil Stadium • Indianapolis, Indiana

- Date: December 7th
- Game time: 5:00 p.m. PST
- Game weather: Indoors
- Game attendance: 67,469
- Referee: Kole Knueppel
- TV announcers (CBS/Compass Media Network): CBS: Brad Nessler (play-by-play), Gary Danielson (color), and Jenny Dell (sideline)
  Compass Media: Gregg Daniels (play-by-play) and Chad Brown (color)

Game information

First quarter

- UO – Kenyon Sadiq, 28-yard TD pass from Dillon Gabriel, Atticus Sappington kick, 10:40 (UO 7–0)
- PSU – Ryan Barker, 33-yard field goal, 7:30 (UO 7–3)
- UO – Sadiq, 2-yard TD pass from Gabriel, Sappington kick, 3:21 (UO 14–3)
- PSU – Nicholas Singleton, 22-yard TD pass from Drew Allar, Barker kick, 1:24 (UO 14–10)

Second quarter

- UO – Terrance Ferguson, 4-yard TD pass from Gabriel, Sappington kick, 13:04 (UO 21–10)
- UO – Jordan James. 1-yard TD run, Sappington kick, 10:05 (UO 28–10)
- PSU – Omari Evans, 22-yard TD pass from Allar, Barker kick, 6:49 (UO 28–17)
- PSU – Allar, 7-yard TD run, Barker kick, 1:53 (UO 28–24)
- UO – Sappington, 32-yard field goal, 0:07 (UO 31–24)

Third quarter

- UO – Tez Johnson, 48-yard TD pass from Gabriel, Sappington kick, 7:36 (UO 38–24)

Fourth quarter

- PSU – Kaytron Allen, 1-yard TD run, two-point conversion run failed, 14:17 (UO 38–30)
- UO – James, 3-yard TD run, Sappington kick, 7:28 (UO 45–30)
- PSU – Harrison Wallace III, 14-yard TD pass from Allar, Barker kick, 3:41 (UO 45–37)

Statistics	PSU	ORE
First downs	28	24
Total yards	523	469
Rushing yards	297	186
Passing yards	226	283
Turnovers	2	0
Time of possession	27:24	32:36

Team	Category	Player	Statistics
Penn State	Passing	Drew Allar	20/39, 226 yards, 3 TD, 2 INT
Penn State	Rushing	Kaytron Allen	14 carries, 124 yards, TD
Penn State	Receiving	Tyler Warren	7 receptions, 84 yards
Oregon	Passing	Dillon Gabriel	22/32, 283 yards, 4 TD
Oregon	Rushing	Jordan James	20 carries, 87 yards, 2 TD
Oregon	Receiving	Tez Johnson	11 receptions, 181 yards, TD

=== vs. Ohio State (Rose Bowl Game / CFP Quarterfinal) ===
2025 Rose Bowl
No. 6 Ohio State Buckeyes (11-2, 7-2) vs No. 1 Oregon Ducks (13-0, 9-0) – Game summary

Quarter	1	2	3	4	Total
No. 6 Buckeyes	14	20	7	0	41
No. 1 Ducks	0	8	7	6	21

at Rose Bowl • Pasadena, California

- Date: January 1, 2025
- Game time: 2:00 p.m. PST
- Game weather: Sunny • Temperature: 70 °F (21 °C) • Wind: N at 6 miles per hour (9.7 km/h)
- Game attendance: 90,732
- Referee: Adam Savoie
- TV announcers (ESPN): Chris Fowler (play-by-play), Kirk Herbstreit (color analyst), and Holly Rowe (sideline reporter)

Game information

First quarter

- (14:00) OSU – Jeremiah Smith 45-yard pass from Will Howard, Jayden Fielding kick (Drive: 3 plays, 75 yards, 1:00; Ohio State 7–0)
- (7:31) OSU – Emeka Egbuka 42-yard pass from Will Howard, Jayden Fielding kick (Drive: 3 plays, 53 yards, 1:05; Ohio State 14–0)

Second quarter

- (14:50) OSU – Jayden Fielding 46-yard field goal (Drive: 10 plays, 63 yards, 3:53; Ohio State 17–0)
- (10:28) OSU – Jeremiah Smith 43-yard pass from Will Howard, Jayden Fielding kick (Drive: 2 plays, 48 yards, 0:43; Ohio State 24–0)
- (8:47) OSU – TreVeyon Henderson 66-yard run, Jayden Fielding kick (Drive: 1 play, 66 yards, 0:10; Ohio State 31–0)
- (2:59) OSU – Jayden Fielding 36-yard field goal (Drive: 10 plays, 43 yards, 4:50; Ohio State 34–0)
- (0:00) ORE – Traeshon Holden 5-yard pass from Dillon Gabriel, Justius Lowe pass from Dillon Gabriel (Drive: 10 plays, 75 yards, 2:59; Ohio State 34–8)

Third quarter

- (8:55) ORE – Noah Whittington 2-yard run, Atticus Sappington kick (Drive: 11 plays, 75 yards, 6:05; Ohio State 34–15)
- (2:19) OSU – TreVeyon Henderson 8-yard run, Jayden Fielding kick (Drive: 6 plays, 56 yards, 3:16; Ohio State 41–15)

Fourth quarter

- (10:00) ORE – Traeshon Holden 27-yard pass from Dillon Gabriel, two-point run failed (Drive: 10 plays, 51 yards, 3:36; Ohio State 41–21)

Statistics	OSU	ORE
First downs	20	15
Total yards	500	276
Rushing yards	181	-23
Passing yards	319	299
Passing: Comp–Att–Int	17–26–0	29–42–0
Time of possession	29:05	30:55

Team	Category	Player	Statistics
Ohio State	Passing	Will Howard	17/26, 319 yards, 3 TD
Ohio State	Rushing	TreVeyon Henderson	8 carries, 94 yards, 2 TD
Ohio State	Receiving	Jeremiah Smith	7 receptions, 187 yards, 2 TD
Oregon	Passing	Dillon Gabriel	29/41, 299 yards, 2 TD
Oregon	Rushing	Jordan James	7 carries, 14 yards
Oregon	Receiving	Traeshon Holden	7 receptions, 116 yards, 2 TD

== Roster ==
2024 Oregon Ducks football team roster
Players
Coaches
Offense

Pos.	#	Name	Class
WR	1	Traeshon Holden	Sr
WR	2	Gary Bryant Jr.	Jr
TE	3	Terrance Ferguson	Sr
QB	5	Dante Moore	So
RB	6	Noah Whittington	Jr
WR	7	Evan Stewart	Jr
QB	8	Dillon Gabriel	Sr
QB	10	Luke Moga	Fr
WR	11	Jeremiah McClellan	Fr
QB	12	Brock Thomas	Fr
WR	13	Jurrion Dickey	Fr
WR	14	Justius Lowe	So
WR	15	Tez Johnson	Sr
QB	16	Austin Novosad	Fr
RB	17	Jay Harris	Jr
WR	17	Kyler Kasper	So
TE	18	Kenyon Sadiq	So
QB	19	Ryder Hayes	Fr
RB	20	Jordan James	Jr
RB	21	Da'Jaun Riggs	Fr
RB	23	Ellis Bynum	So
WR	24	Jalen Saint Paul	Fr
RB	25	Brison Cobbins	Jr
RB	27	Jayden Limar	So
WR	28	Preston Alford	So
RB	29	Kilohana Haasenritter	Jr
TE	40	Kade Caton	Fr
TE	44	Zach Grace	Fr
OL	50	Nishad Strother	Sr
OL	53	Devin Brooks	Fr
OL	55	Marcus Harper II	Sr
OL	56	Trent Ferguson	Fr
OL	59	Fox Crader	Fr
OL	60	Kanen Rossi	Jr
OL	62	Holden Whipple	Jr
OL	64	Ty Delgado	So
OL	65	Ajani Cornelius	Sr
OL	66	Bryce Boulton	Fr
OL	67	Beau CressAllen	Fr
OL	68	Auston Mims	Fr
OL	69	Bailey Jaramillo	Jr
OL	70	Charlie Pickard	Jr
OL	71	George Silva	Sr
OL	72	Iapani Laloulu	So
OL	73	Kawika Rogers	So
OL	74	Dave Iuli	Jr
OL	75	JacQawn McRoy	Fr
OL	76	Josh Conerly Jr.	Jr
OL	77	Matthew Bedford	Sr
OL	78	Gernorris Wilson	Fr
OL	79	Lipe Moala	Fr
WR	80	Dillon Gresham	Fr
WR	81	Ryan Pellum	Fr
TE	83	Roger Saleapaga	Fr
WR	84	Jack Ressler	Fr
TE	85	Travis Brashear	Fr
WR	86	Darrian Anderson	So
TE	87	A. J. Pugliano	Fr
TE	88	Patrick Herbert	Sr
WR	89	Brady Bidwell	Fr

Defense

Pos.	#	Name	Class
DB	0	Tysheem Johnson	Sr
DE	1	Jordan Burch	Sr
ILB	2	Jeffrey Bassa	Sr
DB	3	Brandon Johnson	Sr
ILB	4	Jestin Jacobs	Sr
DB	5	Kobe Savage	Sr
DB	6	Jahlil Florence	Jr
DB	7	Jabbar Muhammad	Sr
DB	8	Dontae Manning	Sr
DB	9	Nikko Reed	Sr
OLB	10	Matayo Uiagalelei	So
DB	11	Kam Alexander	Sr
DB	11	Dakoda Fields	Fr
DB	12	Peyton Woodyard	Fr
DB	13	Sione Laulea	Jr
DB	14	Khamari Terrell	Jr
DB	15	Solomon Davis	Fr
DB	16	Rodrick Pleasant	So
OLB	17	Blake Purchase	So
DB	19	Tyler Turner	Fr
ILB	20	Dylan Williams	Fr
DB	21	Aaron Flowers	Fr
ILB	22	Connor Soelle	Sr
ILB	23	Brayden Platt	Fr
DB	24	Kingston Lopa	Fr
DB	25	Ify Obidegwu	Fr
ILB	26	Devon Jackson	So
DB	27	Daylen Austin	Fr
ILB	28	Bryce Boettcher	Sr
OLB	29	Ashton Porter	Fr
DB	30	Xavier Barksdale	Fr
DB	31	Zach Grisham	So
OLB	32	Emar'rion Winston	So
ILB	33	Kamar Mothudi	Fr
DB	34	Cruz Rushing	So
DB	35	Jacob Pruitt	Fr
DB	36	Timon Davis	Jr
ILB	38	Will Straton	Fr
DB	39	Dane Sipos	Jr
DL	42	Aydin Breland	Fr
OLB	44	Teitum Tuioti	So
ILB	46	Chip Allers	Fr
OLB	47	Elijah Rushing	Fr
DL	50	Tionne Gray	Fr
DL	52	A'Mauri Washington	So
ILB	54	Jerry Mixon	So
DL	55	Derrick Harmon	Jr
OLB	56	Jaeden Moore	Fr
DL	61	JaJuan Dickey	So
DL	77	Jericho Johnson	Fr
OLB	80	Jaxson Jones	Fr
DL	88	Xadavien Sims	Fr
DL	90	Jamaree Caldwell	Sr
DL	93	My'Keil Gardner	Fr
DT	95	Keyon Ware-Hudson	Sr
DL	97	Josh Simmons	Sr
DL	99	Terrance Green	Fr

Special teams

Pos.	#	Name	Class
K	36	Atticus Sappington	Jr
LS	43	Luke Basso	Jr
P	45	Luke Dunne	Fr
P	92	Ross James	Jr
K	93	Grant Meadors	Fr
P	94	Tyler Kinsman	Fr
LS	96	Nick Duzansky	Fr
K	97	Gage Hurych	Fr
K	98	Andrew Boyle	Sr

Head coach

- Dan Lanning

Coordinators/assistant coaches

- Will Stein – Offensive coordinator/quarterbacks
- Tosh Lupoi – Defensive coordinator/linebackers
- Ra'Shaad Samples – Assistant head coach/running backs
- Junior Adams – Co-offensive coordinator/wide receivers
- Chris Hampton – Co-defensive coordinator/defensive backs
- Joe Lorig – Special teams coordinator/nickels
- Drew Mehringer – Tight ends
- Brian Michalowski – Inside linebackers
- A'lique Terry – Offensive linemen
- Tony Tuioti – Defensive linemen
- Wilson Love – Head football strength & conditioning
- Kyle Bolton – Director of speed & performance
- Taylor Porter – Associate strength & conditioning
- Mark Davis – Assistant strength & conditioning
- Drew Jordan – Assistant strength & conditioning
- Kamran Araghi – Graduate assistant - defense
- Rashad Wadood – Graduate assistant - defense
- Jack Smith – Graduate assistant - offense
- Ryan Walk – Graduate assistant - offense
- Dante Bartee – Defensive analyst
- Connor Boyd – Defensive analyst
- Kyle Cogan – Defensive analyst
- Darrion Daniels – Defensive analyst
- Antonio Parks – Defensive analyst
- Mike Cavanaugh – Offensive analyst
- Donte Ellington – Offensive analyst
- Steven Haunga – Offensive analyst
- Koa Ka'ai – Offensive analyst
- Matt Lombardi – Offensive analyst
- Zach Tinker – Special teams analyst

Legend

- (C) Team captain
- (S) Suspended
- (I) Ineligible
- Injured
- Redshirt

Roster
