= Ryan Day =

American football coach (born 1979)

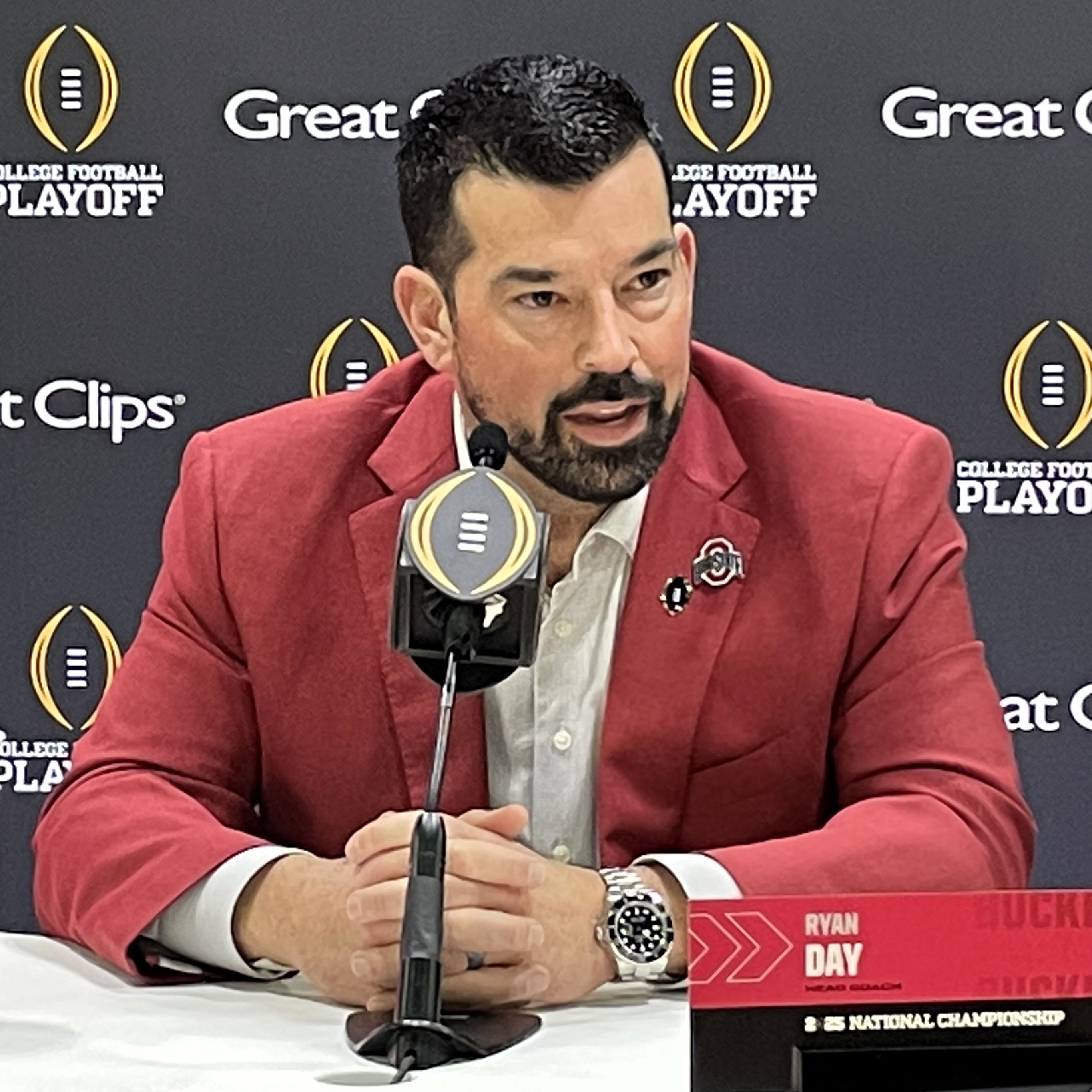
- Day talking to the press ahead of the 2025 CFP National Championship

Current position
- Title: Head coach
- Team: Ohio State
- Conference: Big Ten
- Record: 89–16
- Annual salary: $12.5 million

Biographical details
- Born: March 12, 1979 (age 47); Manchester, New Hampshire, U.S.

Playing career
- 1998–2001: New Hampshire
- Positions: Quarterback, linebacker

Coaching career (HC unless noted)
- 2002: New Hampshire (TE)
- 2003–2004: Boston College (GA)
- 2005: Florida (GA)
- 2006: Temple (WR)
- 2007–2011: Boston College (WR)
- 2012: Temple (OC/WR)
- 2013–2014: Boston College (OC/QB)
- 2015: Philadelphia Eagles (QB)
- 2016: San Francisco 49ers (QB)
- 2017: Ohio State (co-OC/QB)
- 2018: Ohio State (OC/QB/acting HC)
- 2019–present: Ohio State

Head coaching record
- Overall: 89–16
- Bowls: 6–5
- Tournaments: 5–4 (CFP)

Accomplishments and honors

Championships
- 1 National (2024); 2 Big Ten (2019–2020); 3 Big Ten East Division (2019–2021)

Awards
- Big Ten Coach of the Year (2019)

Ryan Patrick Day (born March 12, 1979) is an American football coach and former college football player. He is the 24th and current head football coach at Ohio State University, a position he has held since 2019. Day was also the acting head coach for the Ohio State Buckeyes for the first three games of the 2018 season. He attended the University of New Hampshire in Durham, where he was a quarterback and linebacker for the Wildcats from 1998 to 2001 before beginning his coaching career in 2002.

== Playing career ==
Ryan Patrick Day was born in Manchester, New Hampshire, on March 12, 1979. Day attended Manchester Central High School. As a quarterback and defensive back, he was the state's Gatorade Player of the Year for his senior season. He then went to the University of New Hampshire. Playing for then-offensive coordinator Chip Kelly and head coach Sean McDonnell, Day set four career records at UNH including completion percentage and touchdowns. As a senior in 2001, Day was also a team captain.

== Coaching career ==
=== Early career ===
McDonnell hired Day right out of college to be the tight ends coach at New Hampshire for the 2002 season. From 2003 to 2004 he was a graduate assistant at Boston College under head coach Tom O'Brien. In 2005, fellow Manchester native Dan Mullen hired Day as a graduate assistant at Florida, at the start of Urban Meyer's tenure there. While at Florida, Day coached future NFL wide receiver Chad Jackson. Day departed Florida after the season to coach wide receivers at Temple with offensive coordinator George DeLeone and head coach Al Golden, both in their first year. For the 2007 season, Day returned to Boston College, now coached by Jeff Jagodzinski, as wide receivers coach.

Boston College fired Jagodzinski after the 2008 season; Jagodzinski interviewed for the vacant New York Jets job (the Jets ultimately hired Rex Ryan) after athletic director Gene DeFilippo ordered him not to. Defensive coordinator Frank Spaziani succeeded Jagodzinski and retained Day. Steve Addazio, Temple head coach since 2011, hired Day as offensive coordinator for the 2012 season. Boston College fired Spaziani after the 2012 season and hired Addazio to succeed him. Day returned to BC with Addazio as offensive coordinator.

Following the 2014 season, Chip Kelly, now the head coach of the Philadelphia Eagles, hired Day as his quarterbacks coach. Then, in 2016, after Kelly was relieved of his duties in Philadelphia, Day was hired in the same role by Kelly, who became the head coach of the San Francisco 49ers. On January 3, 2017, Day was hired to replace co-offensive coordinator Tim Beck of the Ohio State Buckeyes. After being linked to the Tennessee Titans offensive coordinator position in January 2018, Day was promoted to offensive coordinator and primary play caller at Ohio State.

=== Ohio State ===
==== 2018 season ====
On August 1, 2018, Day was named acting head coach at Ohio State when head coach Urban Meyer was placed on administrative leave when news came to light of Meyer's knowledge of events surrounding then-fired Zach Smith's domestic violence accusations made by Smith's estranged wife. Day won all three games during Meyer's absence. On December 4, 2018, Ohio State announced that Meyer would retire as head coach after the 2019 Rose Bowl and be replaced by Day on a full-time basis.

==== 2019 season ====
In 2019, Day's first season as a full-time head coach, he led the Buckeyes to a perfect 12–0 regular season record, the Buckeyes' first undefeated regular season since 2013. Despite being predicted to finish second in the Big Ten East Division according to the 2019 Cleveland.com preseason poll, the Buckeyes clinched the division following their November 23 victory over Penn State and secured a spot in the Big Ten Championship, which they won over Wisconsin, 34–21. The Buckeyes were named the number two seed in the College Football Playoff and lost to the Clemson Tigers in the Fiesta Bowl. On December 3, 2019, Day was named the Dave McClain Coach of the Year by the media.

==== 2020 season ====
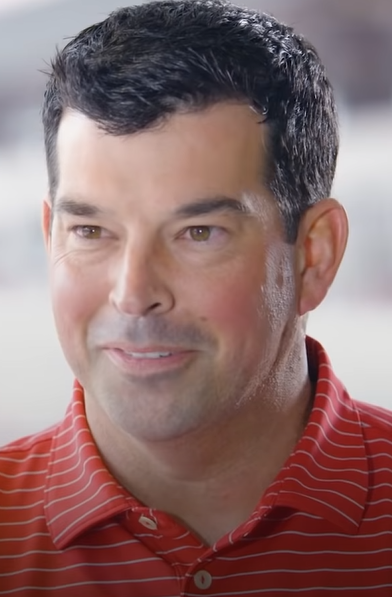
Day in 2019

Day's second season was significantly shortened because of the Big Ten Conference's policies regarding the COVID-19 pandemic. The Buckeyes' regular season was shortened from 12 games to 8 games and then down to five because of cancellations resulting from the pandemic. After starting the season 4–0, Day was forced to miss the December 5 game against Michigan State after testing positive for COVID-19, which the Buckeyes won, 52–12. What would have been Ohio State's sixth regular season game, against rival Michigan, was cancelled because COVID-19 concerns within the Michigan program. This was the first time since the 1917 season that Ohio State and Michigan did not play each other. The Big Ten's coronavirus policies would have prevented the Buckeyes from playing in the 2020 Big Ten Football Championship Game, as they did not meet the six-game threshold put forth by the conference. However, on December 9, 2020, the Big Ten administrative council voted to remove the six-game minimum, allowing Ohio State to advance to the conference championship. The Buckeyes played in the Big Ten Championship game on December 19 where they beat the Northwestern Wildcats 22–10. Ohio State was selected as the number 3 seed in the College Football Playoff where they faced number 2 Clemson in the 2021 Sugar Bowl. Ohio State defeated Clemson 49–28, and advanced to the 2021 College Football Playoff National Championship to face number 1 Alabama. The Buckeyes lost to Alabama, 52–24.

==== 2021 season ====
The 2021 season, Day's third full season as head coach, began with the Buckeyes ranked fourth in both the AP and Coaches' Poll. After an early season upset by Oregon, Day led Ohio State through a nine-game win streak behind Heisman finalist C. J. Stroud. Ohio State had wins against then 20th-ranked Penn State and fifth-ranked Michigan State. Going into the Michigan game, Ohio State was ranked No. 2 and Michigan was ranked No. 5 by the College Football Playoff committee. Michigan defeated Ohio State for the first time since 2011. Though Ohio State and Michigan tied for the division championship, the head-to-head victory earned Michigan the right to represent the Big Ten East in the Conference Championship game. This loss also effectively eliminated Ohio State from playoff contention. Ohio State was picked to play Utah in the Rose Bowl and won the Rose Bowl, 48–45.

==== 2022 season ====
The 2022 season, which was Day's fourth full season at the helm, featured the Buckeyes starting ranked #2 in the nation in both the AP and Coaches' Poll. With returning quarterback C. J. Stroud, Ohio State managed to start 8–0, with double digit wins at home over a then-top 5 Notre Dame and away at the #13 ranked Penn State Nittany Lions. In the inaugural College Football Playoff rankings of the season, the Buckeyes landed at #2, a spot they would hold for four weeks. Though they struggled in games against a 1–7 Northwestern and a 6–4 Maryland, Ohio State managed to remain undefeated heading into the matchup against #3 Michigan for the series' second matchup of 11–0 teams (the first since 2006), and the third meeting between top-5 teams since they met in 2016. Despite being favored by eight points, Ohio State lost 45–23, and managed to score only three points in the second half. With this loss, Ohio State failed to reach the Big Ten Championship for the second consecutive season, and Day fell to 1–2 against the Wolverines, becoming the first Ohio State head coach to lose multiple games to Michigan in the 21st century. Despite the loss to the Wolverines, the Buckeyes made the College Football Playoff as the 4-seed. In the College Football Playoff Semifinal at the Chick-fil-A Peach Bowl, Day and Buckeyes fell to the eventual National Champion Georgia Bulldogs 42–41.

==== 2023 season ====
The Buckeyes entered the 2023 season, Day's fifth, as the #3 ranked team in the AP Poll. However, early offensive struggles in the first two games against the Indiana Hoosiers and Youngstown State Penguins caused them to drop to #6, despite winning both games. Day's Buckeye teams, who often had high powered offenses led by star quarterbacks, were seen as a team that would win games on defense, marking a shift. However, a last-second 17–14 win against the Notre Dame Fighting Irish boosted the Buckeyes back to #4.

After the comeback win, in the postgame interview, Day called out legendary Notre Dame head coach Lou Holtz, saying, "I'd like to know where Lou Holtz is right now. What he said about our team, I cannot believe. This is a tough team right here. We’re proud to be from Ohio. It’s always been Ohio against the world, and it’ll continue to be Ohio against the world. But I’ll tell you what: I love those kids. We’ve got a tough team." The comments were in response to Holtz, who before the game predicted that Notre Dame would beat Ohio State by being more physical, and that Day's losses were due to Ohio State not being a physical team.

The win would fuel the Buckeyes, who would continue to win and beat #7 Penn State. This effort had them ranked #1 in the first CFP Poll. It marked the first time since Week 14 of 2019, Day's first season at the helm, that the Buckeyes would be ranked first in the poll. After Week 10, the Georgia Bulldogs overtook Ohio State, dropping the Buckeyes to #2. This would lead to the Buckeyes reaching an 11–0 record and being ranked #2 going into the Michigan game for the third consecutive year. For the third consecutive year, the Buckeyes would fall to the Wolverines, as Michigan won 30–24. It marked the Buckeyes first three-game losing streak to Michigan since 1995–97.

Missing out on the Playoff, the Buckeyes were invited to the 2023 Cotton Bowl, where they would play the Missouri Tigers. With starting quarterback Kyle McCord in the transfer portal, backup Devin Brown would start. However, Brown would get injured in the first half, putting true freshman Lincoln Kienholz at the helm. Kienholz and the Buckeyes struggled mightily to get any offense going, and as the game went on, the defense would get worn out, causing the Buckeyes to lose 14–3, finishing the season with an 11–2 record.

==== 2024 season ====
The 2024 Ohio State Buckeyes began their season ranked #2 in the AP Poll, coming out with a fiery 5–0 start, featuring wins over Akron (52–6), Western Michigan (56–0), Marshall (49–14), Michigan State (38–7), and Iowa (35–7). This set up a highly anticipated #2 vs. #3 matchup against Oregon in Eugene. A back-and-forth game, the Buckeyes fell to the Ducks 32–31, marking Day's second regular season loss to a team besides Michigan, the first also being the Ducks in 2021. After the game, there was much question about Day's ability to win big games; Day was 2–6 against teams that were ranked in the Top 5.

The team entered their bye week and returned with five straight wins. After a close win against Nebraska at home, they beat #3 Penn State, and won against #5 Indiana leading into the Michigan game. The Buckeyes entered the Michigan game ranked #2 for the fourth straight year, and as 23.5 point favorites, the largest in history. However, the Buckeyes were defeated 13–10. It was Day's first loss to an unranked team. The loss moved the Buckeyes down to #6 in the CFB poll. Day hired security to protect his family due to death threats. With the newly implemented expanded playoff, they were set to battle Tennessee as the eight-seed at home in the first round.

In the first round of the playoff, the Buckeyes scored touchdowns on their first three drives en route to a 42–17 victory, setting up a rematch against one-seed Oregon in the historic Rose Bowl. The Buckeyes held a 34–0 lead before a late Oregon touchdown made it 34–8 going into halftime. Ohio State went on to win 41–21. They would then face five-seed Texas in the Cotton Bowl Classic, where they won 28–14. The Buckeyes would play Notre Dame in the 2025 College Football Playoff National Championship which they won 34–23, giving Day his first national championship as a head coach.

==== 2025 season ====
Entering the season as the defending national champions, the Buckeyes faced a big test at home in Week 1, the #1 ranked Texas Longhorns, setting up a rematch of last years Cotton Bowl that Ohio State won en route to the National Championship. The game was a defensive battle, and the Buckeyes pulled it out, 14–7. Dating back to the previous season, the game was Day and the Buckeye's fifth straight against opponents ranked in the Top 10, and sixth in the last seven games, all games that the Buckeyes ended up winning. It was also the sixth straight win that Day had against opponents ranked in the Top 5, pushing his record against such teams to 8–6.

On October 4, 2025, Day led Ohio State to a 42–3 victory over the Minnesota Golden Gophers, improving his overall record as head coach to 75–10 (.882). On November 29, 2025, Day led the Buckeyes to a 27–9 victory in Ann Arbor over Michigan, culminating a 12–0 perfect regular season and marking Day's second victory over Michigan as OSU's head coach, as well as Ohio State's first win against Michigan since 2019.

On December 6, 2025, Day led Ohio State into the Big Ten Championship Game against No. 2 Indiana, marking the program’s third conference title appearance under his tenure. Despite entering at 12–0 and ranked No. 1 nationally, the Buckeyes fell 13–10 in a defensive matchup decided by a missed field goal in the final minute. This was Ohio State’s first loss in over a year and marked Day’s first defeat in a conference championship game, though the Buckeyes still secured the No. 2 seed in the College Football Playoff, where they would lose to the No. 10 seed, Miami, in the Cotton Bowl.

==== 2026 season ====
In the second week of the season, the #1-ranked Buckeyes blew a 20-point lead in the fourth quarter to lose at Texas, 24–23. It marked the first time in program history that Ohio State had lost a game after leading by 17 points or more at halftime. In the USC game, the #2 ranked Buckeyes would lose 18–30 to an unranked USC team for Ryan Day's second loss to an unranked team as head coach.

== Personal life ==
Day met his wife, Christina Ourania Spirou, whom he calls Nina, when they played together on the same tee-ball team when she was seven and he was six. Married in June 2005, the Days have three children. Day is Catholic.

Day grew up in a single parent household with his mother after his father died by suicide when Day was nine years old. Day is an advocate for mental health awareness. Since becoming head coach at Ohio State, Day and his wife have chosen to partner with an organization focused on removing stigmas related to mental health called On Our Sleeves, a movement begun at the Nationwide Children's Hospital. An extension of this partnership is The Christina and Ryan Day Fund for Pediatric and Adolescent Mental Wellness, launched in 2019 by the Days with a $100,000 gift. In 2022, Day and his wife launched the Nina and Ryan Day Resilience Fund with a $1 million gift to The Ohio State University Wexner Medical Center and College of Medicine to fund research and services that promote mental health.

== Head coaching record ==
Year	Team	Overall	Conference	Standing	Bowl/playoffs	Coaches^{#}	AP^{°}
Ohio State Buckeyes (Big Ten Conference) (2018)
2018	Ohio State	3–0 (Note: Ohio State head coach Urban Meyer was placed on administrative leave for the first three games of the 2018 season. Day served as acting head coach in his absence. Ohio State credits the first three games of the season to Day and the remaining 11 games, including the Rose Bowl, to Meyer.)	1–0				
Ohio State Buckeyes (Big Ten Conference) (2019–present)
2019	Ohio State	13–1	9–0	1st (East)	L Fiesta^{†}	3	3
2020	Ohio State	7–1	5–0	1st (East)	W Sugar^{†}, L CFP NCG^{†}	2	2
2021	Ohio State	11–2	8–1	T–1st (East)	W Rose^{†}	5	6
2022	Ohio State	11–2	8–1	2nd (East)	L Peach^{†}	4	4
2023	Ohio State	11–2	8–1	2nd (East)	L Cotton^{†}	10	10
2024	Ohio State	14–2	7–2	4th	W CFP First Round^{†}, W Rose^{†}, W Cotton^{†}, W CFP NCG^{†}	1	1
2025	Ohio State	12–2	9–0	T–1st	L Cotton^{†}	6	5
2026	Ohio State	7–4	5–3				
Ohio State:		89–16	60–8				
Total:		89–16					
National championship Conference title Conference division title or championship game berth
^{†}Indicates CFP / New Years' Six bowl.; ^{#}Rankings from final Coaches Poll.; ^{°}Rankings from final AP Poll.
