= 2023 college football recruiting class =

Recruiting of students for US college football

The college football recruiting class of 2023 refers to the recruiting of high school athletes to play college football in the United States, starting in the fall of 2023. The scope of this article covers: (a) the colleges and universities with recruiting classes ranking among the top 25 in the country as assessed by at least one of the major media outlets, and (b) the individual recruits ranking among the top 25 in the country as assessed by at least one of the major media outlets.

== Top ranked classes ==
School	247	Rivals	On3
Alabama	1	1	1
Georgia	2	2	2
Texas	3	3	3
Oklahoma	4	6	7
Ohio State	5	4	4
LSU	6	5	5
Miami (FL)	7	7	6
Oregon	8	8	8
Tennessee	9	12	12
Notre Dame	10	10	9
Clemson	11	9	10
USC	12	11	13
Penn State	13	15	14
Florida	14	13	11
Texas A&M	15	14	15
South Carolina	16	17	16
Auburn	17	16	17
Michigan	18	18	19
TCU	19	20	18
Florida State	20	25	20
Utah	21	19	21
Arkansas	22	21	23
Michigan State	23	36	24
Nebraska	24	24	28
Mississippi State	25	22	25

== Top ranked recruits ==
The following individuals were rated by one of the major media outlets among the top 20 players in the country in the Class of 2023. They are listed in order of their highest ranking by any of the major media outlets.

Player	Position	School	ESPN	Rivals	247Sports	On3
Arch Manning	Quarterback	Texas	2	1	1	2
Malachi Nelson	Quarterback	USC	1	6	5	19
Dante Moore	Quarterback	UCLA	3	2	2	55
Cormani McClain	Cornerback	Colorado	4	3	4	17
Nico Iamaleava	Quarterback	Tennessee	32	4	3	1
Francis Mauigoa	Offensive tackle	Miami (FL)	5	19	8	14
Samuel M'Pemba	Defensive end	Georgia	29	5	44	97
Zachariah Branch	Wide receiver	USC	6	13	9	5
Keon Keeley	Defensive end	Alabama	20	20	6	3
Kadyn Proctor	Offensive tackle	Alabama	10	15	7	44
Jaquavious Russaw	Outside linebacker	Alabama	7	67	61	25
Carnell Tate	Wide receiver	Ohio State	236	7	25	63
Jackson Arnold	Quarterback	Oklahoma	8	22	15	12
Brandon Inniss	Wide receiver	Ohio State	30	8	19	94
Peter Woods	Defensive tackle	Clemson	9	61	54	48
Nyck Harbor	Athlete	South Carolina	35	9	11	26
Matayo Uiagalelei	Edge	Oregon	65	34	10	76
Desmond Ricks	Cornerback	Alabama	17	10	33	47
TJ Shanahan Sr.	Offensive guard	Texas A&M	120	11	--	283
James Smith	Defensive tackle	Alabama	11	54	22	8
Caleb Downs	Safety	Alabama	12	25	13	11
David Hicks Jr.	Defensive tackle	Texas A&M	15	14	12	16
Anthony Hill Jr.	Outside linebacker	Texas	18	12	27	62
Makai Lemon	Wide receiver	USC	13	78	21	88
Peyton Bowen	Safety	Oklahoma	14	47	73	13
Jurrion Dickey	Wide receiver	Oregon	34	24	14	9
Samson Okunlola	Offensive tackle	Miami (FL)	16	16	16	73
Hykeem Williams	Wide receiver	Florida State	24	17	30	85
Jaden Rashada	Quarterback	Arizona State	27	59	17	151
Jayden Wayne	Defensive end	Miami (FL)	83	18	62	130
Vic Burley	Defensive line	Clemson	76	69	18	120
Richard Young	Running back	Alabama	19	36	43	87
Justice Haynes	Running back	Alabama	21	26	69	43
Javien Toviano	Cornerback	LSU	44	21	80	136
Eli Holstein	Quarterback	Alabama	22	98	117	121
Rueben Owens II	Running back	Texas A&M	42	23	20	50
Joenel Aguero	Safety	Georgia	23	101	32	45
AJ Harris	Cornerback	Georgia	33	30	23	89
J'ven Williams	Offensive tackle	Penn State	56	187	24	6
Tony Mitchell	Safety	Alabama	25	49	35	75
Damon Wilson	EDGE	Georgia	31	9	26	4
Adepoju Adebawore	EDGE	Oklahoma	57	35	40	7
Charles Jagusah	Offensive Tackle	Notre Dame	66	119	31	10
