= Jack Sawyer =

American football player (born 2002)

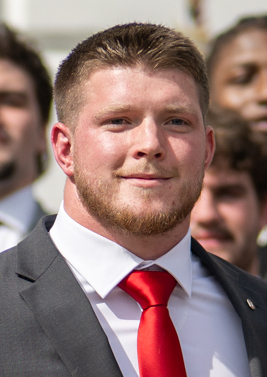
- Sawyer in 2025

No. 33 – Pittsburgh Steelers
- Position: Outside linebacker
- Roster status: Active

Personal information
- Born: May 6, 2002 (age 24); Columbus, Ohio, U.S.
- Listed height: 6 ft 4 in (1.93 m)
- Listed weight: 260 lb (118 kg)

Career information
- High school: Pickerington North (Pickerington, Ohio)
- College: Ohio State (2021–2024)
- NFL draft: 2025: 4th round, 123rd overall pick

Career history
- Pittsburgh Steelers (2025–present)

Awards and highlights
- CFP national champion (2024); 2× Second-team All-Big Ten (2023, 2024)

Career NFL statistics as of Week 7, 2026
- Combined tackles: 50
- Sacks: 1.0
- Pass deflections: 5
- Interceptions: 2
- Stats at Pro Football Reference

Jack Sawyer (born May 6, 2002) is an American professional football outside linebacker for the Pittsburgh Steelers of the National Football League (NFL). He played college football for the Ohio State Buckeyes and was later selected by the Steelers in the fourth round of the 2025 NFL Draft.

== Early life ==
Sawyer was born on May 6, 2002, in Columbus, Ohio. He grew up in Pickerington, Ohio and attended Pickerington High School North, where he played basketball and football for the Panthers. After making the school's varsity football team as a backup tight end, he was moved to defensive end and finished the season with 58 tackles, 16.5 tackles for loss and 3.5 sacks. Sawyer then committed to play college football at Ohio State shortly after his sophomore season, when he recorded 62 tackles, 15 tackles for loss, and six sacks. He chose the Buckeyes over offers from Michigan, Notre Dame, Penn State, and Oklahoma.

Due to injuries, Sawyer took over as the Panthers' starting quarterback during his junior season. He completed 79 of 135 passes for 1,056 yards and nine touchdowns while rushing for 386 yards and six touchdowns and was named the Ohio Capital Conference-Ohio Division Defensive Player of the Year after recording 13.5 sacks and 19 tackles for loss before suffering a torn MCL in the state playoffs. Sawyer opted not to play in his senior football season due to uncertainties surrounding COVID-19.

== College career ==
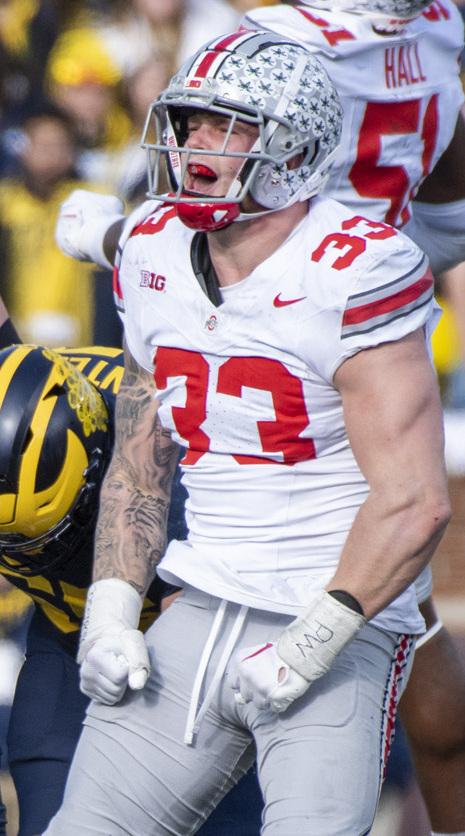
Sawyer in 2023

Sawyer enrolled at Ohio State a semester early. He won the Rose Bowl in 2022 with the team, but was ejected during the game for targeting Utah quarterback Cameron Rising.

During his senior season, Sawyer's participation in a post-game brawl after Ohio State's 13–10 upset loss to the Michigan Wolverines football team garnered significant media attention and criticism.

In the 2025 Cotton Bowl, Sawyer returned a fumble touchdown in the fourth quarter after a strip-sack of Texas quarterback and former Buckeye teammate Quinn Ewers, which ultimately sealed the victory for the Buckeyes as they advanced to the national championship. Sawyer was named the game's defensive MVP.

Sawyer and Ohio State finished the season by winning the 2025 College Football Playoff National Championship against Notre Dame.

He ended his college career with 144 total tackles (29 for a loss), 23 sacks, an interception, and six forced fumbles. In December 2024, while preparing for the College Football Playoffs, he graduated with a degree in sports industry.

== Professional career ==
Pre-draft measurables
Height	Weight	Arm length	Hand span	Wingspan	Bench press
6 ft 4 1/4 in (1.94 m)	260 lb (118 kg)	31 3/4 in (0.81 m)	9 3/4 in (0.25 m)	6 ft 5 1/8 in (1.96 m)	21 reps
All values from NFL Combine/Pro Day

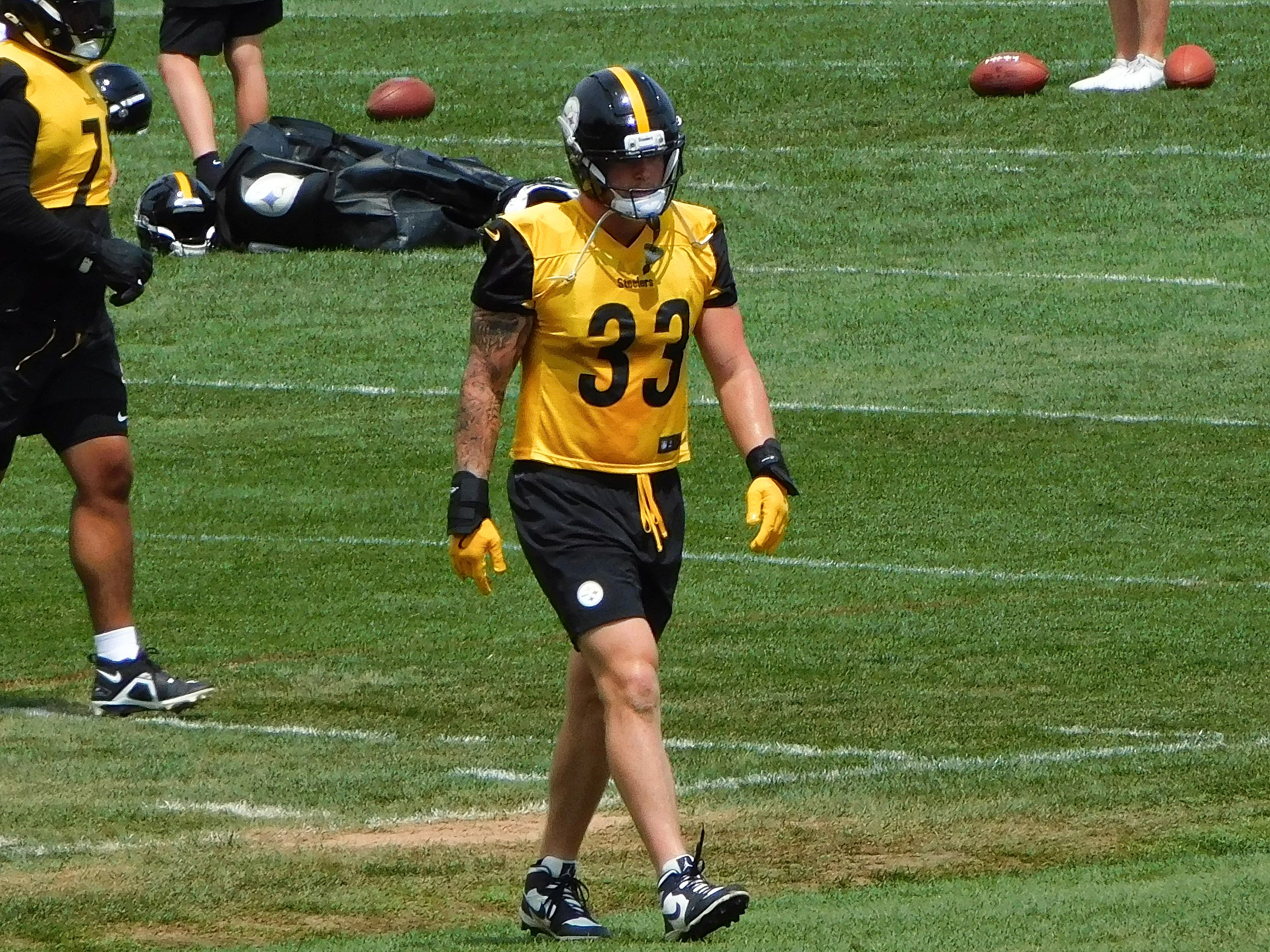
Sawyer with the Pittsburgh Steelers in 2025

Sawyer was selected by the Pittsburgh Steelers in the fourth round (123rd overall) of the 2025 NFL draft. When the Steelers released their first official depth chart on August 5, Sawyer was named the backup left outside linebacker to T. J. Watt, splitting reps with DeMarvin Leal. He made his first appearance with Pittsburgh in Week 1's victory over the New York Jets, in which he recorded one tackle. On September 21, Sawyer made his first professional sack on quarterback Sam Darnold as the Steelers lost to the Seattle Seahawks. In Week 17 against the Cleveland Browns, Sawyer recorded his second career interception against Shedeur Sanders.

== NFL career statistics ==
=== Regular season ===
Year	Team	Games		Tackles					Interceptions						Fumbles				
Year	Team	GP	GS	Cmb	Solo	Ast	Sck	TFL	Int	Yds	Avg	Lng	TD	PD	FF	Fum	FR	Yds	TD
2025	PIT	17	1	34	16	18	1.0	3	2	31	15.5	27	0	4	0	0	0	0	0
2026	PIT	7	0	16	6	10	0.0	2	0	0	0.0	0	0	1	0	0	0	0	0
Career		24	1	50	22	28	1.0	5	2	31	15.5	27	0	5	0	0	0	0	0

=== Postseason ===
Year	Team	Games		Tackles					Interceptions						Fumbles				
Year	Team	GP	GS	Cmb	Solo	Ast	Sck	TFL	Int	Yds	Avg	Lng	TD	PD	FF	Fum	FR	Yds	TD
2025	PIT	1	0	1	1	0	1.0	1	0	0	0.0	0	0	0	1	0	0	0	0
Career		1	0	1	1	0	1.0	1	0	0	0.0	0	0	0	1	0	0	0	0

== Personal life ==
Sawyer is the son of Lyle and Michelle Sawyer. Sawyer is a Christian.
