= Jordan James (American football) =

American football player (born 2004)

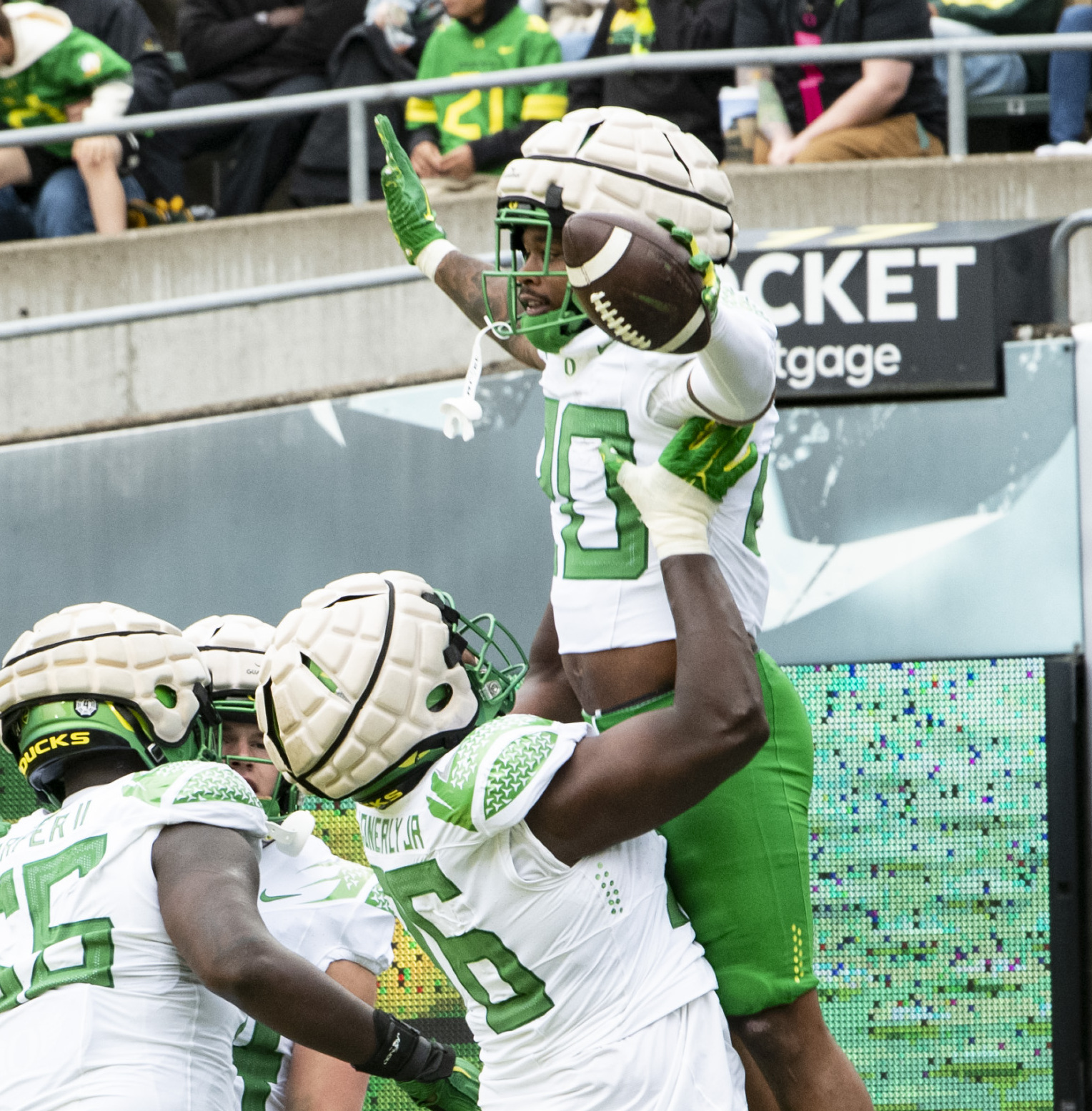

No. 29 – San Francisco 49ers
- Position: Running back

Personal information
- Born: March 29, 2004 (age 22); Nashville, Tennessee, U.S.
- Listed height: 5 ft 9 in (1.75 m)
- Listed weight: 208 lb (94 kg)

Career information
- High school: Oakland (Murfreesboro, Tennessee)
- College: Oregon (2022–2024)
- NFL draft: 2025: 5th round, 147th overall pick

Career history
- San Francisco 49ers (2025–present)

Career NFL statistics as of Week 4, 2026
- Rushing yards: 15
- Rushing average: 3.8
- Rushing touchdowns: 0
- Stats at Pro Football Reference

Jordan James (born March 29, 2004) is an American professional football running back for the San Francisco 49ers of the National Football League (NFL). He played college football for the Oregon Ducks and was selected by the 49ers in the fifth round of the 2025 NFL draft.

== Early life ==
James was born on March 29, 2004, in Nashville, Tennessee. He attended Oakland High School in Murfreesboro, where he rushed for 1,653 yards and 24 touchdowns as a senior. James earned all-area Player of the Year honors, and led his team to a class 6A state title. James was ranked as a four-star recruit and the 16th best running back in the class of 2022. He committed to play college football for the Oregon Ducks over other schools such as Florida and Georgia.

== College career ==
During Week 7 of the 2022 season, James rushed 10 times for 69 yards and a touchdown in a 49–22 victory over Arizona. He finished his freshman season in 2022 with 189 yards and five touchdowns on 46 carries, while also one reception for six yards.

During the 2023 season opener, James rushed 10 times for 86 yards and three touchdowns in an 81–7 blowout victory over Portland State. In Week 5, he rushed for 88 yards and a touchdown on six carries in a win over Stanford. Three weeks later, James had 13 carries for 103 yards in a 38–24 victory over Washington State.

James finished the 2024 season with 266 carries for 1,253 yards and 15 touchdowns.

=== Statistics ===
Year	Team	Games		Rushing				Receiving			
Year	Team	GP	GS	Att	Yards	Avg	TD	Rec	Yards	Avg	TD
2022	Oregon	10	0	46	189	4.1	5	1	6	6.0	0
2023	Oregon	14	0	107	759	7.1	11	15	132	8.8	1
2024	Oregon	13	12	226	1,253	5.5	15	24	202	8.4	0
Career		37	12	379	2,201	5.8	31	40	340	8.5	1

== Professional career ==
Pre-draft measurables
Height	Weight	Arm length	Hand span	Wingspan	40-yard dash	10-yard split	20-yard split	Vertical jump	Broad jump	Bench press
5 ft 9 1/2 in (1.77 m)	205 lb (93 kg)	29 3/4 in (0.76 m)	9 1/2 in (0.24 m)	6 ft 1 3/4 in (1.87 m)	4.55 s	1.62 s	2.68 s	32.0 in (0.81 m)	9 ft 9 in (2.97 m)	20 reps
All values from NFL Combine/Pro Day

James was selected by the San Francisco 49ers in the fifth round (147th overall) of the 2025 NFL draft. The 49ers previously acquired the pick in a trade that sent Deebo Samuel to the Washington Commanders. He made his first NFL carries in the 41–6 road loss to the Seattle Seahawks during the Divisional Round. James had six carries for 28 yards to go with a seven-yard reception.
