= Traeshon Holden =

American football player (born 2001)

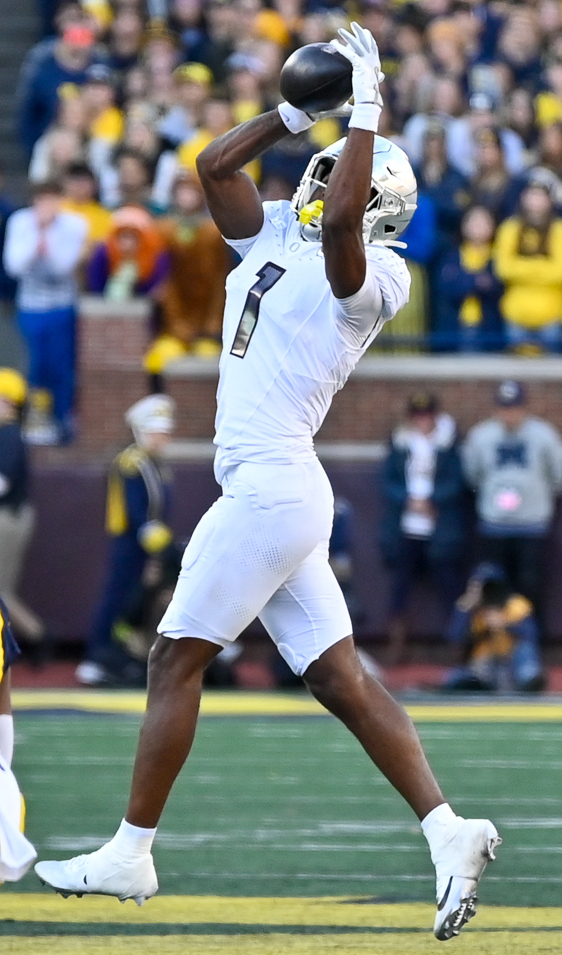
- Holden in 2024

Profile
- Position: Wide receiver

Personal information
- Born: August 12, 2001 (age 25); Kissimmee, Florida, U.S.
- Listed height: 6 ft 2 in (1.88 m)
- Listed weight: 208 lb (94 kg)

Career information
- High school: Narbonne (Los Angeles, California)
- College: Alabama (2020–2022); Oregon (2023–2024)
- NFL draft: 2025: undrafted

Career history
- Dallas Cowboys (2025)*
- * Offseason or practice squad member only
- Stats at Pro Football Reference

Traeshon Holden (born August 12, 2001) is an American professional football wide receiver. He played college football for the Alabama Crimson Tide and Oregon Ducks.

== Early life ==
Born in Kissimmee, Florida, Holden attended and played high school football St. Frances Academy in Baltimore, Maryland before transferring to Narbonne High School in Los Angeles, California for his senior season. Holden was rated a four-star prospect and committed to play college football at Alabama over offers from Clemson, Florida, Oregon, and USC.

== College career ==
=== Alabama ===
In his true freshman season, Holden played in five games but didn't have any receptions.

In Holden's sophomore season, he played in 15 games and finished the season with 21 receptions for 239 receiving yards. Holden played in the 2022 College Football Playoff National Championship game against the Georgia Bulldogs and he finished the game with 6 receptions for 28 yards in the 33–18 loss.

=== Oregon ===
On December 11, 2022, Holden transferred to Oregon. On February 15, 2023, he was dismissed from the team following his felony arrest. He was subsequently reinstated after being cleared of all charges.

=== College statistics ===
Season	Season	Games		Receiving				Rushing			
Season	Season	GP	GS	Rec	Yds	Avg	TD	Att	Yds	Avg	TD
2020	Alabama	5	0	0	0	0.0	0	0	0	0.0	0
2021	Alabama	15	0	21	239	11.4	1	0	0	0.0	0
2022	Alabama	10	5	25	331	13.2	6	0	0	0.0	0
2023	Oregon	14	2	37	452	12.2	6	2	12	6.0	1
2024	Oregon	14	14	45	718	16.0	5	2	22	11.0	0
Career		52	21	128	1,740	13.6	18	4	34	8.5	1

== Professional career ==
Pre-draft measurables
Height	Weight	Arm length	Hand span	Wingspan	40-yard dash	10-yard split	20-yard split	Vertical jump	Broad jump
6 ft 2 1/8 in (1.88 m)	205 lb (93 kg)	31 5/8 in (0.80 m)	9 7/8 in (0.25 m)	6 ft 6 1/2 in (1.99 m)	4.57 s	1.54 s	2.69 s	32.0 in (0.81 m)	10 ft 3 in (3.12 m)
All values from NFL Combine

After going unselected in the 2025 NFL draft, Holden signed with the Dallas Cowboys as an undrafted free agent. He was waived on August 26 as part of final roster cuts and re-signed to the practice squad the next day.

Holden signed a reserve/future contract with Dallas on January 6, 2026. On August 17, Holden was waived by the Cowboys.
