= Jurrion Dickey =

American football player (born 2005)

No. 42 – Diablo Valley Vikings
- Position: Wide receiver
- Class: Sophomore

Personal information
- Born: June 15, 2005 (age 21); East Palo Alto, California, U.S.
- Listed height: 6 ft 3 in (1.91 m)
- Listed weight: 210 lb (95 kg)

Career information
- High school: Menlo-Atherton (CA); Valley Christian High School (San Jose, CA)
- College: Oregon (2023–2024); Diablo Valley (2025–2026); Midland University (2026-present)
- Stats at ESPN

Jurrion Dickey (born June 15, 2005) is an American football wide receiver for the Diablo Valley Vikings. He previously played for the Oregon Ducks football team.

== Early life ==
A native of East Palo Alto, California, Dickey attended San Jose Valley Christian High School before transferring as a senior to Menlo-Atherton High School. He was rated as a five-star player and rated by 247Sports as the No. 13 overall player in the 2023 college football recruiting class. He was ranked as the No. 2 wide receiver by 247Sports, No. 5 by ESPN.com, and No. 7 by Rivals.com. He received scholarship offers from numerous college football programs, including Georgia, Miami (FL), Oregon, Tennessee, Texas A&M, UCLA, USC, Washington, and Wisconsin. The San Francisco Chronicle wrote a feature story in March 2023 about Dickey's experience in the "Wild West of NIL".

Dickey sustained an injury that resulted in him missing much of his senior year. He appeared in only four games as a senior, totaling 20 catchers for 453 yards and six touchdowns.

== College football ==
Dickey committed to Oregon in May 2022 and signed his letter of intent in December 2022. Upon joining the Oregon Ducks in the summer of 2023, he asked for and received jersey No. 99 at Oregon. Oregon wide receivers coach Junior Adams noted: "He wanted 99, so he got 99. If you know Jurrion, that's Jurrion. I've never had a 99 in 20 years, it's a first." He later changed his jersey to #13. Dickey enrolled at Midland University, a Nebraska-based NAIA program competing in the Great Plains Athletic Conference (GPAC), on January 15, 2026.
