= Will Howard (American football) =

American football player (born 2001)

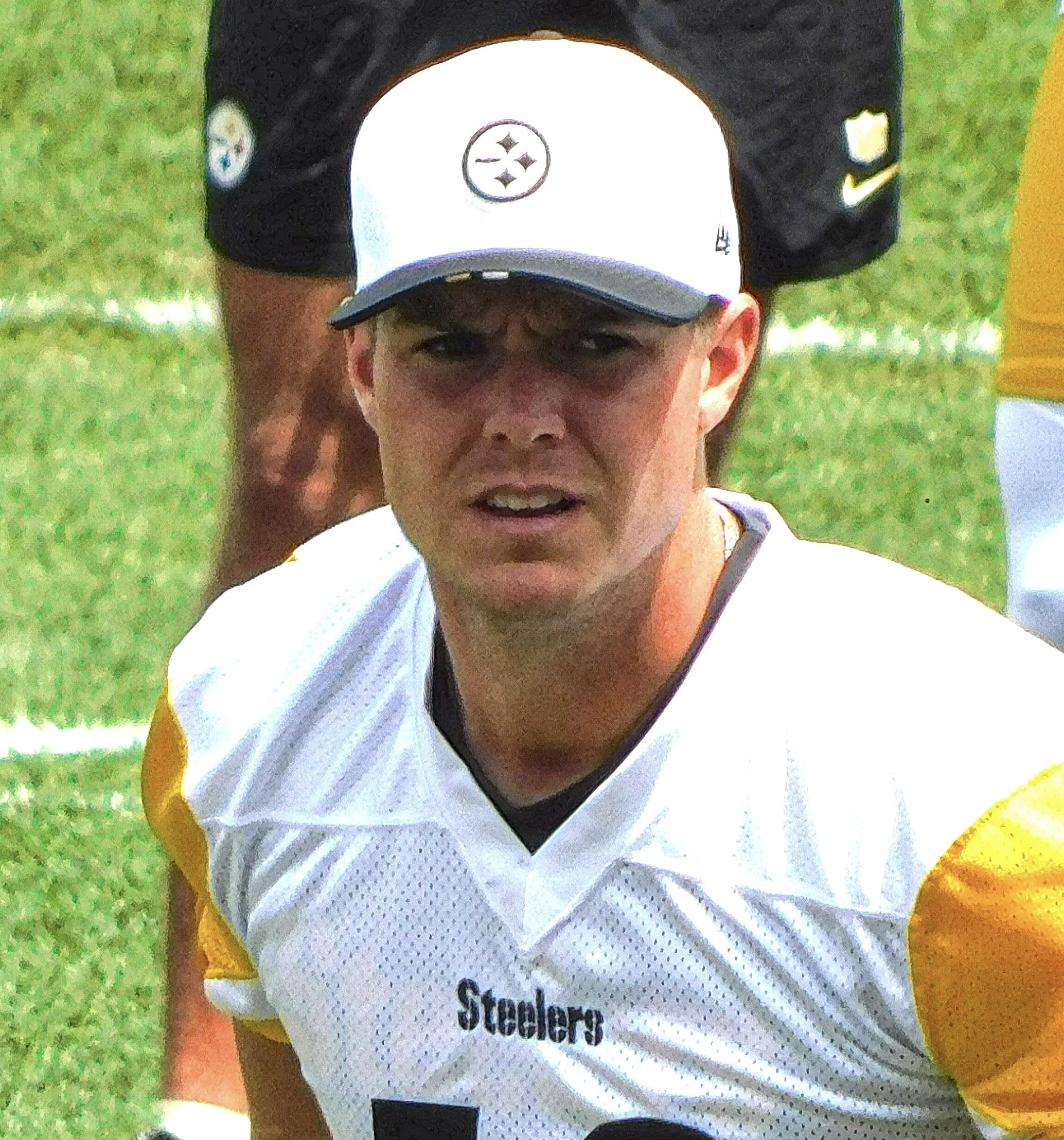
- Howard with the Pittsburgh Steelers in 2025

No. 18 – Pittsburgh Steelers
- Position: Quarterback
- Roster status: Active

Personal information
- Born: September 24, 2001 (age 25); West Chester, Pennsylvania, U.S.
- Listed height: 6 ft 4 in (1.93 m)
- Listed weight: 236 lb (107 kg)

Career information
- High school: Downingtown West (Downingtown, Pennsylvania)
- College: Kansas State (2020–2023); Ohio State (2024)
- NFL draft: 2025: 6th round, 185th overall pick

Career history
- Pittsburgh Steelers (2025–present)

Awards and highlights
- CFP national champion (2024); CFP National Championship Game offensive MVP (2025); Second-team All-Big 12 (2023); Third-team All-Big Ten (2024); Cotton Bowl Classic offensive MVP (2025)
- Stats at Pro Football Reference

William Thomas Howard (born September 24, 2001) is an American professional football quarterback for the Pittsburgh Steelers of the National Football League (NFL). He played college football for the Kansas State Wildcats and Ohio State Buckeyes, where he was a CFP national champion with the latter, and was selected by the Steelers in the sixth round of the 2025 NFL draft.

== Early life ==
Howard was born in West Chester, Pennsylvania, and attended Downingtown West High School in Downingtown, Pennsylvania. He was named the Maxwell Football Club Pennsylvania Player of the Year after passing for 2,543 yards and 27 touchdowns as a senior. Howard finished his high school career with 5,308 passing yards and 48 touchdown passes while also rushing for 512 yards and 21 touchdowns. He also was a two-time All-Area selection in basketball and scored over 1,000 points in his varsity career.

Howard was rated a three-star recruit and received more than 20 total scholarship offers. He committed to play college football at Kansas State after considering offers from Maryland, Minnesota, Rutgers, and Kansas.

== College career ==
=== Kansas State ===
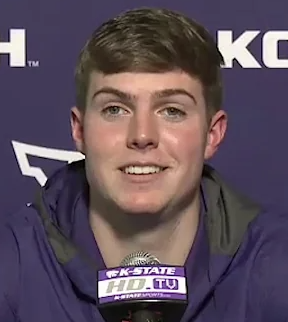
Howard during his freshman season at Kansas State

Howard joined the Kansas State Wildcats as an early enrollee in January 2020. He began his freshman season as the backup to starting quarterback Skylar Thompson and started the final seven games after Thompson suffered a serious injury. Howard finished the season with 90 completions on 168 pass attempts for 1,178 yards with eight touchdowns and 10 interceptions and rushed for 364 yards and three touchdowns. He served as Thompson's backup again as a sophomore after competing for the starting job in practice. Howard played in six games with three starts.

As a junior, Howard began spring practice as the Wildcats first-string quarterback. Transfer Adrian Martinez was ultimately named the starter going into the 2022 and he initially intended to redshirt the season. Howard came in relief of Martinez after he suffered an injury against the TCU Horned Frogs and led the Wildcats on four straight touchdown drives and started the following game against the Oklahoma State Cowboys. Howard completed 19 of 27 passes for 196 yards and three touchdowns in relief of Martinez after he suffered another injury against the Baylor Bears. He became Kansas State's starting quarterback a second time after it was revealed Martinez's injury was serious. Howard finished the season with 1,633 passing yards and 14 touchdowns and four interceptions in seven games played.

After his junior season, Howard entered the NCAA transfer portal on November 27, 2023.

=== Ohio State ===
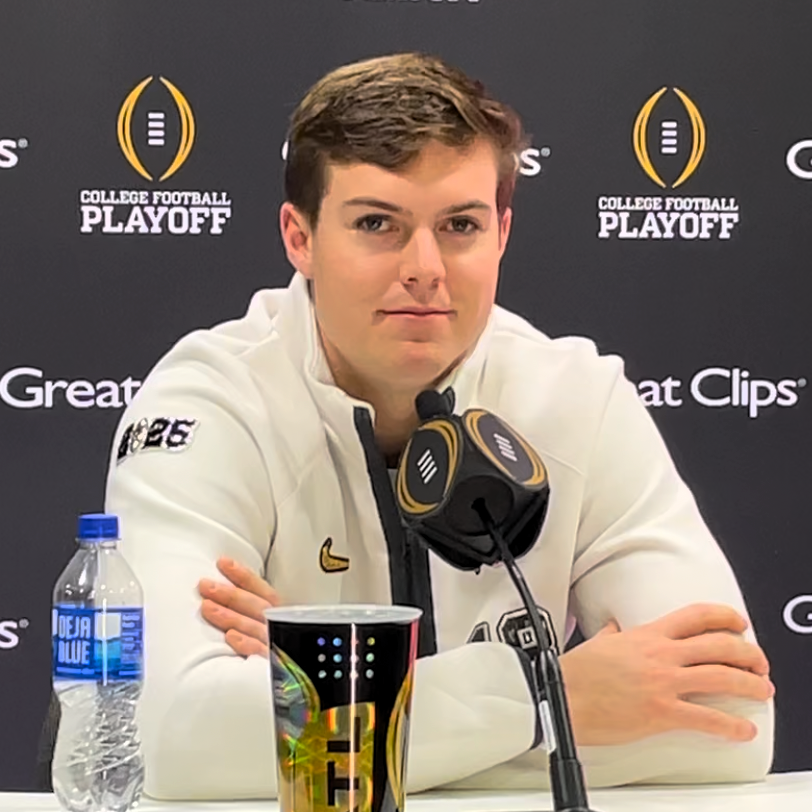
Howard talking to reporters at CFP Championship press conference.

Howard committed to Ohio State on January 4, 2024, for his senior season following an official visit to Columbus. He was named the starting quarterback on August 5, 2024. Howard started all 16 games for the Buckeyes recording 4,010 passing yards, 35 touchdowns, and a completion percentage of 73%. On November 2, 2024, then No. 4 Ohio State defeated No. 3 Penn State 20-13. After the game, Howard expressed immense satisfaction, calling it a personal win due to the Nittany Lions not offering him a scholarship, and emphasized the team "willed themselves" to victory.

In the College Football Playoff National Championship, on January 20, 2025, Howard led Ohio State to victory over the Notre Dame Fighting Irish and was named Offensive MVP. Howard's 73% completion percentage set a new single-season school record.

In the postseason, Howard passed for over 1,000 yards, 8 touchdowns, and only 2 interceptions. His performance helped lead the team to a national title.

=== College statistics ===
Legend
	Won the CFP National Championship
**Bold**	Career high

Season	Team	Games			Passing								Rushing			
Season	Team	GP	GS	Record	Comp	Att	Pct	Yards	Avg	TD	Int	Rate	Att	Yards	Avg	TD
2020	Kansas State	9	7	2−5	90	168	53.6	1,178	7.0	8	**10**	116.3	78	**364**	4.7	3
2021	Kansas State	6	3	1−2	30	55	54.5	332	6.0	1	1	107.6	32	184	**5.8**	4
2022	Kansas State	7	5	4−1	119	199	59.8	1,633	8.2	15	4	149.6	35	22	0.6	3
2023	Kansas State	12	12	8−4	219	357	61.3	2,643	7.4	24	**10**	140.1	81	351	4.3	**9**
2024	Ohio State	16	16	**14−2**	**309**	**423**	**73.0**	**4,010**	**9.5**	**35**	**10**	**175.3**	**105**	226	2.2	7
Career		50	43	29−14	767	1,202	63.8	9,796	8.1	83	35	149.2	331	1,147	3.5	26

== Professional career ==
Pre-draft measurables
Height	Weight	Arm length	Hand span	Wingspan	20-yard shuttle	Three-cone drill	Vertical jump	Broad jump
6 ft 4 1/4 in (1.94 m)	236 lb (107 kg)	32 in (0.81 m)	9 in (0.23 m)	6 ft 5 1/8 in (1.96 m)	4.33 s	7.13 s	31.5 in (0.80 m)	9 ft 4 in (2.84 m)
All values from NFL Combine

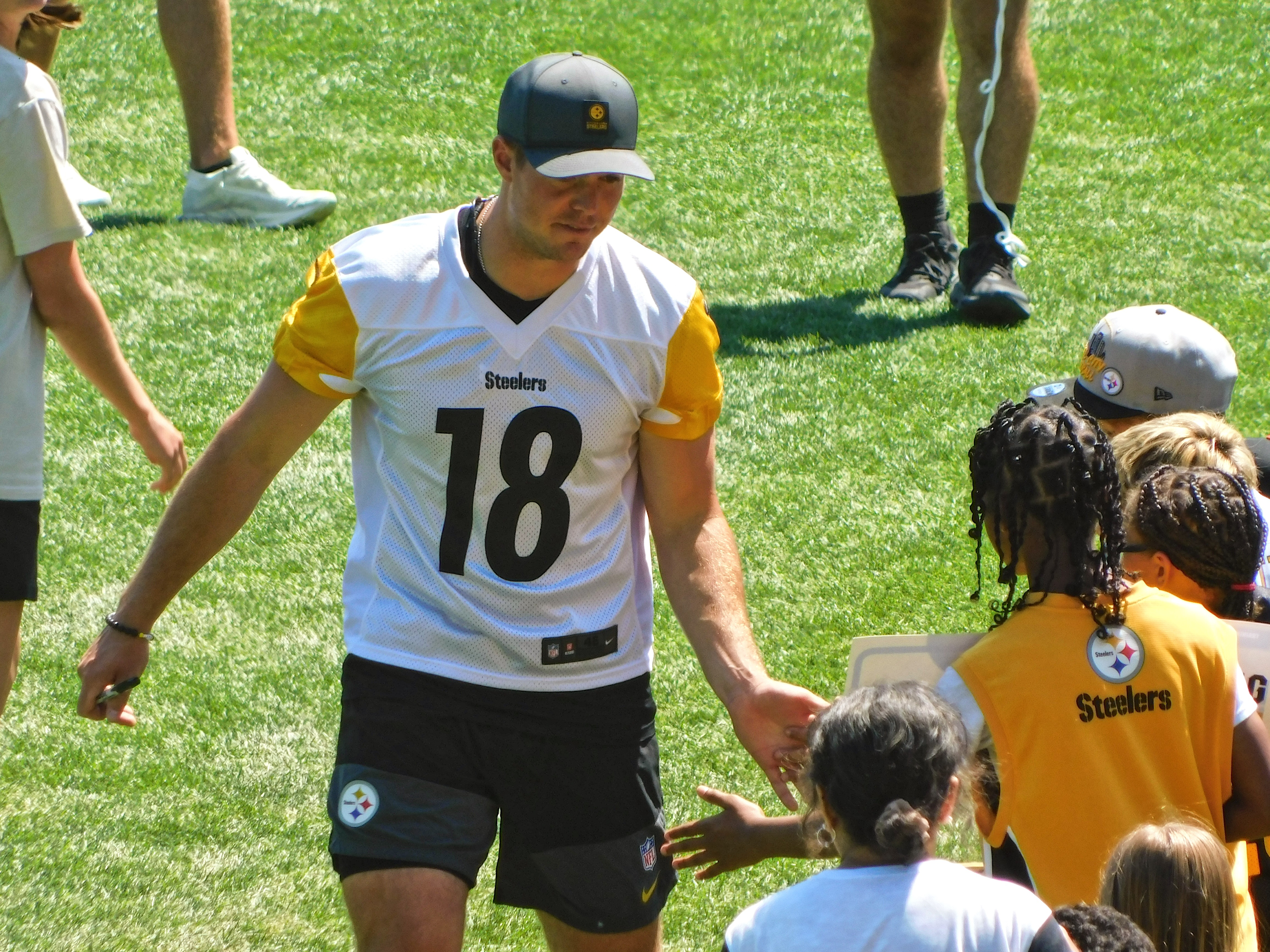
Howard during training camp, 2026

Howard was selected by the Pittsburgh Steelers in the sixth round with the 185th overall pick of the 2025 NFL draft. Shortly after being drafted by the Steelers, he appeared on former Steelers quarterback Ben Roethlisberger's podcast Footbahlin With Ben Roethlisberger alongside teammate Jack Sawyer. Later, Howard revealed Roethlisberger was serving as a mentor to him following his selection by the Steelers.

On August 5, 2025, Howard fractured his hand during a Steelers practice. The injury did not require surgery but required him to sit out of practice for the following three weeks. This eliminated him from participating in the Steelers’ preseason games. Howard was subsequently placed on injured reserve to begin the regular season. On November 12, the Steelers activated him off injured reserve.

Prior to the 2026 season, the Steelers released their training camp depth chart which placed Howard alongside rookie Drew Allar as third string quarterback behind Aaron Rodgers and Mason Rudolph.

== Personal life ==
Howard is the son of Bob and Maureen Howard. He has one brother and two sisters. Howard's younger brother, Ryan, plays football at Kansas State. Howard and his family are devout Catholics.

He began dating his girlfriend, Skyler Skoglund, in November 2024.
