= Matayo Uiagalelei =

American football player (born 2005)

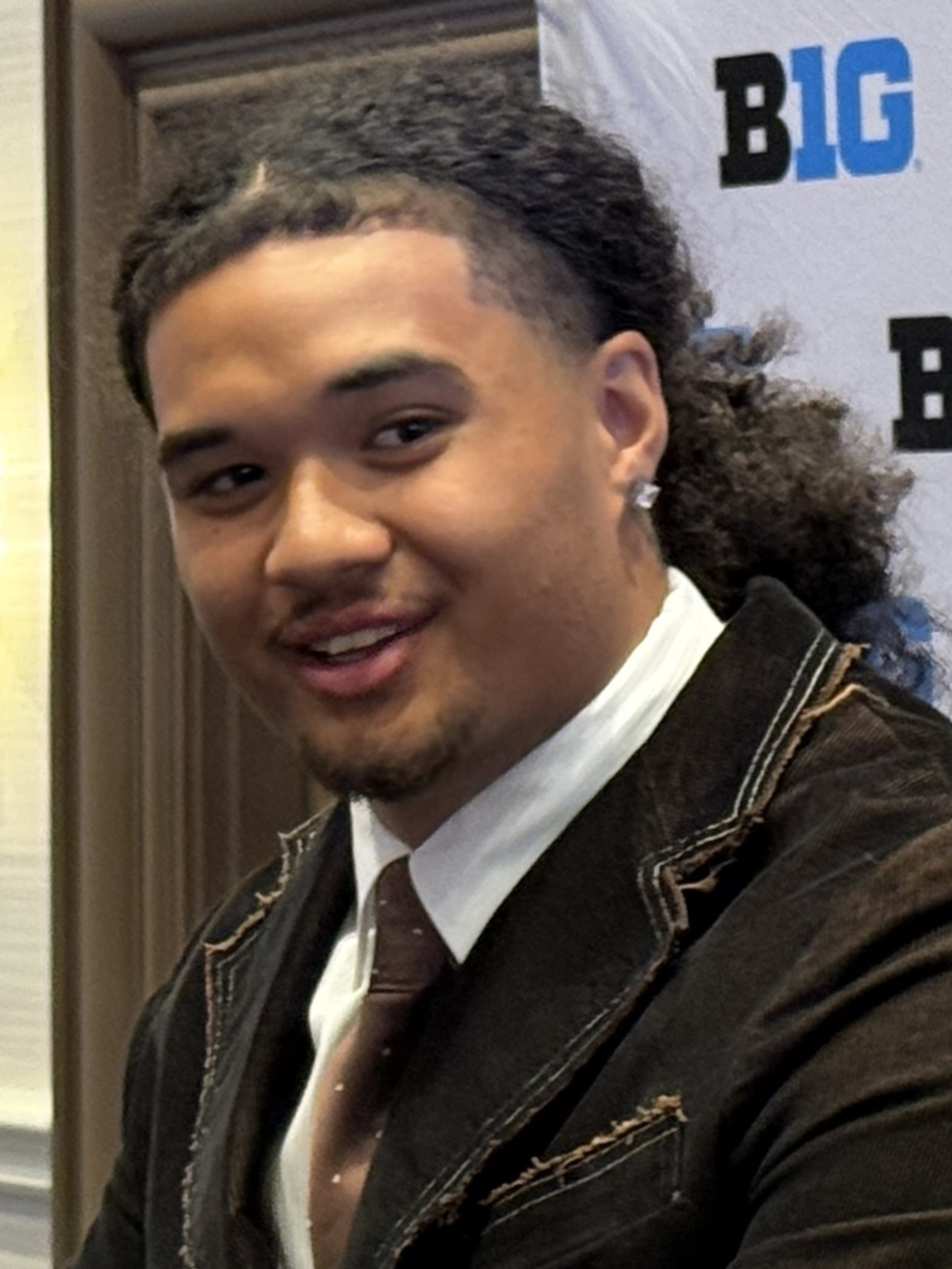
- Uiagalelei at 2025 Big Ten Media Days

No. 10 – Oregon Ducks
- Position: Defensive end
- Class: Senior

Personal information
- Born: July 2, 2005 (age 21)
- Listed height: 6 ft 5 in (1.96 m)
- Listed weight: 272 lb (123 kg)

Career information
- High school: St. John Bosco (California)
- College: Oregon (2023–present)

Awards and highlights
- First-team All-Big Ten (2024)
- Stats at ESPN

Matayo Uiagalelei (/uiˌʌŋɡələˈleɪ/ oo-ee-UNG-gə-lə-LAY) (born July 2, 2005) is an American football defensive end for the Oregon Ducks.

== Early life ==
Uiagalelei is of Samoan descent. His older brother, DJ Uiagalelei, is a quarterback for the Los Angeles Chargers. Matayo attended St. John Bosco High School. He played on both offense (tight end) and defense (defensive end) at St. John Bosco. He was rated by Sports Illustrated as the No. 19 prospect in the 2023 college football recruiting class. Rivals.com rated him as the No. 20 recruit overall (No. 3 in California). He had scholarship offers from multiple Power 4 schools.

== College career ==
Uiagalelei accepted a scholarship from Oregon in December 2022 and enrolled early in 2023. During Oregon's 2023 summer camp, he was used at both tight end and defensive end.
