= 2025 Big Ten Conference football season =

American college football season

- League: NCAA Division I Football Bowl Subdivision
- Sport: Football
- Duration: August 28, 2025 through January 2026
- Teams: 18
- TV partner(s): Fox Sports (Fox, FS1, Big Ten Network); CBS Sports (CBS, Paramount+); NBC Sports (NBC, Peacock)

2026 NFL draft
- Top draft pick: Fernando Mendoza
- Picked by: Las Vegas Raiders

Regular season

Championship Game
- Date: December 6, 2025
- Venue: Lucas Oil Stadium, Indianapolis, Indiana
- Champions: Indiana
- Runners-up: Ohio State
- Finals MVP: Fernando Mendoza, QB, Indiana

Football seasons
- 2024 2026

2025 Big Ten Conference football standings
	Conf.			Overall
Team	W		L	W		L
No. 1 Indiana y$#^	9	–	0	16	–	0
No. 5 Ohio State y^	9	–	0	12	–	2
No. 4 Oregon ^	8	–	1	13	–	2
No. 21 Michigan	7	–	2	9	–	4
No. 20 USC	7	–	2	9	–	4
No. 17 Iowa	6	–	3	9	–	4
Illinois	5	–	4	9	–	4
Washington	5	–	4	9	–	4
Minnesota	5	–	4	8	–	5
Nebraska	4	–	5	7	–	6
Northwestern	4	–	5	7	–	6
Penn State	3	–	6	7	–	6
UCLA	3	–	6	3	–	9
Rutgers	2	–	7	5	–	7
Wisconsin	2	–	7	4	–	8
Maryland	1	–	8	4	–	8
Michigan State	1	–	8	4	–	8
Purdue	0	–	9	2	–	10
Championship: Indiana 13, Ohio State 10
# – College Football Playoff champion; ^ – College Football Playoff participant; $ – Conference champion; y – Championship game participant; As of November 18, 2026; Rankings from AP Poll

The 2025 Big Ten Conference football season is the 130th season of college football play for the Big Ten Conference and part of the 2025 NCAA Division I FBS football season. This is the Big Ten's second season with 18 teams and its second season since 2010 with a non-divisional scheduling format.

The end of the season saw the Indiana Hoosiers win their first ever national championship in football, while also delivering the Big Ten its third consecutive national championship.

== Coaching changes ==
The Big Ten saw one head coaching change for the 2025 season.

On December 1, 2024, Purdue announced it was parting ways with head coach Ryan Walters after going 5–19 in two seasons, including 1–11 in 2024.

One week later, on December 8, 2024, Purdue announced the hiring of Barry Odom as the next head coach, having spent the previous season coaching at UNLV.

Three weeks into the 2025 season, UCLA fired DeShaun Foster after an 0–3 start for the Bruins. Tim Skipper will serve as interim coach for the remainder of the season.

On October 12, 2025, following the week 7 games, Penn State announced that they had fired James Franklin after three consecutive losses to Oregon, UCLA, and Northwestern. Terry Smith was named interim head coach for the remainder of the season. Penn State would later hire Iowa State coach Matt Campbell as the permanent successor in Happy Valley.

Following the season, Michigan parted ways with Sherrone Moore and replaced him with former Utah coach Kyle Whittingham. Michigan State dismissed Jonathan Smith and hired former Northwestern coach Pat Fitzgerald to take the reins for the Spartans.

Finally, UCLA filled its coaching vacancy with the hiring of James Madison coach Bob Chesney.

== Preseason ==
=== Recruiting classes ===
Rankings
Team	Rivals	Scout & 24/7	On3 Recruits	Signees
Illinois	11	12	12	22
Indiana	13	14	16	23
Iowa	15	11	11	16
Maryland	9	8	10	21
Michigan	3	3	3	24
Michigan State	14	16	14	18
Minnesota	16	15	15	22
Nebraska	6	6	6	20
Northwestern	16	17	17	20
Ohio State	1	1	2	26
Oregon	2	2	1	20
Penn State	5	5	4	27
Purdue	18	18	18	14
Rutgers	10	10	9	27
UCLA	12	13	13	19
USC	4	4	5	24
Washington	8	7	7	28
Wisconsin	7	9	8	23

=== Big Ten Media Days ===
- July 22–24, 2025 – Media Days, Las Vegas (Mandalay Bay)

==== Preseason Media Poll ====
The annual Cleveland.com Preseason Big Ten Media Poll.

Predicted finish	Team	Points (1st place votes)
1	Penn State	435 (11)
2	Ohio State	431 (10)
3	Oregon	405 (2)
4	Illinois	353
5	Michigan	346 (1)
6	Indiana	305
7	Iowa	287
8	Nebraska	277
9	USC	269
10	Washington	216
11	Minnesota	192
12	Wisconsin	159
T-13	Michigan State	135
T-13	Rutgers	135
15	UCLA	134
16	Maryland	91
17	Northwestern	65
18	Purdue	39

Predicted Big Ten Champion
Rank	Team	Votes
1	Ohio State	13
2	Penn State	12

==== Preseason Player of the Year ====
Preseason Offensive Player of the Year
Rank	Player	Position	Team	Points (1st place votes)
1	Jeremiah Smith	WR	Ohio State	66 (21)
2	Drew Allar	QB	Penn State	38 (4)
3	Nicholas Singleton	RB	Penn State	15
4	Makhi Hughes	RB	Oregon	5
5	Kaytron Allen	RB	Penn State	4
6	Luke Altmyer	QB	Illinois	3
T-7	Dante Moore	QB	Oregon	2
T-7	Mark Gronowski	QB	Iowa	2
T-7	Elijah Sarratt	WR	Indiana	2
T-7	Julian Sayin	QB	Ohio State	2
T-7	Justice Haynes	RB	Michigan	2
T-12	Logan Jones	C	Iowa	1
T-12	Denzel Boston	WR	Washington	1
T-12	Fernando Mendoza	QB	Indiana	1
T-12	Jonah Coleman	RB	Washington	1
T-12	Nico Iamaleava	QB	UCLA	1

Preseason Defensive Player of the Year
Rank	Player	Position	Team	Points (1st place votes)
1	Caleb Downs	S	Ohio State	72 (22)
2	Dani Dennis-Sutton	DE	Penn State	17 (1)
3	Dillon Thieneman	S	Oregon	15 (1)
4	Matayo Uiagalelei	DE	Oregon	14
5	Mikail Kamara	DE	Indiana	12 (2)
6	Gabe Jacas	LB	Illinois	8
7	Koi Perich	S	Minnesota	5
8	Sonny Styles	LB	Ohio State	4
T-9	Zane Durant	DT	Penn State	2
T-9	Jaishawn Barham	LB	Michigan	2
T-11	Aiden Fisher	LB	Indiana	1
T-11	Ernest Hausmann	LB	Michigan	1

Preseason Coach of the Year
Rank	Coach	Team	Votes
1	James Franklin	Penn State	10
2	Bret Bielema	Illinois	9
3	Ryan Day	Ohio State	3
4	Sherrone Moore	Michigan	2
5	Dan Lanning	Oregon	1

=== All-American Teams ===
Player	AP	AS	WCFF	ESPN	CBS	CFN	PFF	SN	SI	USAT
Drew Allar									1st team	
Kaytron Allen	2nd team	2nd team							1st team	2nd team
Bryce Boettcher		3rd team								
Denzel Boston		4th team								
Caden Chittenden			2nd team							
Jonah Coleman		3rd team								
Rhys Dakin		2nd team								
Nick Dawkins					2nd team					
Ryan Day (Coach)						2nd team				
Dani Dennis-Sutton		2nd team								
Caleb Downs	1st team	1st team	1st team	Team	1st team	1st team	Team	1st team	1st team	1st team
Gennings Dunker		3rd team						2nd team		
Zane Durant	1st team	3rd team	1st team		1st team		Team	2nd team	1st team	1st team
Ryan Eckley	2nd team	4th team	2nd team			1st team			2nd team	
Aiden Fisher	2nd team	3rd team						1st team		2nd team
A.J. Harris		4th team								
Makhi Hughes	2nd team	2nd team	2nd team			2nd team		2nd team	2nd team	2nd team
Vega Ioane	1st team	1st team		Team	1st team	1st team		1st team	2nd team	1st team
Gabe Jacas		3rd team		Team	2nd team	2nd team			2nd team	
Logan Jones		2nd team	2nd team			1st team				2nd team
Mikail Kamara		2nd team	2nd team		2nd team				1st team	
Max Klare	2nd team	4th team			2nd team				2nd team	
Iapani Laloulu		3rd team						2nd team		
Makai Lemon		3rd team							1st team	
Riley Mahlman		4th team								
Derrick Moore		4th team								
Koi Perich	2nd team	3rd team	2nd team		2nd team		Team	2nd team	1st team	2nd team
D'Angelo Ponds	2nd team	2nd team	1st team				Team	2nd team	2nd team	2nd team
Emmanuel Pregnon		4th team								
Elijah Sarratt	2nd team	2nd team	2nd team		2nd team	2nd team				
Xavier Scott		4th team				2nd team				
Nicholas Singleton	1st team	1st team	1st team	Team	1st team	1st team		2nd team	1st team	1st team
Jeremiah Smith	1st team	1st team	1st team	Team	1st team	1st team	Team	1st team	1st team	1st team
Sonny Styles		2nd team			2nd team			2nd team	1st team	2nd team
Carnell Tate		2nd team						2nd team		
Darius Taylor		4th team								
Dillon Thieneman	1st team	1st team	2nd team		1st team	1st team		1st team		1st team
Matayo Uiagalelei	2nd team	2nd team			2nd team	1st team				2nd team
Kaden Wetjen		2nd & 3rd team						2nd team		
Zakee Wheatley		4th team								
Isaiah World					2nd team					
Dominic Zvada	1st team	1st team	1st team	Team	1st team	1st team	Team	1st team	1st team	1st team

== Rankings ==
		Pre	Wk 1	Wk 2	Wk 3	Wk 4	Wk 5	Wk 6	Wk 7	Wk 8	Wk 9	Wk 10	Wk 11	Wk 12	Wk 13	Wk 14	Wk 15	Final
Illinois	AP	12	11	9	9	23	22	17	RV	23	RV	RV	RV	RV	RV	RV	RV	RV
Illinois	C	12	12	9	8	23	22	17	25	23		RV	RV	RV	RV	RV	RV	25
Illinois	CFP	Not released												21				
Indiana	AP	20	23	22	19	11	8	7	3 (3)	2 (6)	2 (11)	2 (11)	2 (6)	2 (8)	2 (7)	2 (5)	1 (66)	1 (66)
Indiana	C	19	21	19	17	12	9	7	3 (1)	2	2	2 (1)	2	2	2	2	1 (61)	1 (62)
Indiana	CFP	Not released										2	2	2	2	2	1	
Iowa	AP	RV									RV	RV	RV	RV	RV	RV	RV	17
Iowa	C	RV	RV			RV	RV	RV	RV	RV	RV	24	RV	RV	RV	RV	RV	17
Iowa	CFP	Not released										20	21			23	23	
Maryland	AP					RV	RV											
Maryland	C					RV	RV											
Maryland	CFP	Not released																
Michigan	AP	14	15	23	21	19	20	15	RV	25	21	21	18	18	15	18	18	21
Michigan	C	14	13	22	20	18	20	15	RV	24	21	20	17	17	15	18	17	22
Michigan	CFP	Not released										21	18	18	15	19	18	
Michigan State	AP																	
Michigan State	C																	
Michigan State	CFP	Not released																
Minnesota	AP									RV								
Minnesota	C	RV										RV						
Minnesota	CFP	Not released																
Nebraska	AP	RV	RV	RV	RV			RV	25									
Nebraska	C	RV	RV	RV	RV	RV	RV	RV	RV		RV		RV	RV				
Nebraska	CFP	Not released																
Northwestern	AP																	
Northwestern	C									RV								
Northwestern	CFP	Not released																
Ohio State	AP	3 (11)	1 (55)	1 (57)	1 (55)	1 (52)	1 (46)	1 (40)	1 (50)	1 (60)	1 (54)	1 (54)	1 (55)	1 (57)	1 (58)	1 (61)	3	5
Ohio State	C	2 (20)	1 (59)	1 (62)	1 (62)	1 (61)	1 (58)	1 (59)	1 (63)	1 (65)	1 (62)	1 (60)	1 (59)	1 (61)	1 (61)	1 (63)	3	6
Ohio State	CFP	Not released										1	1	1	1	1	2	
Oregon	AP	7 (1)	6 (1)	4 (1)	6 (1)	6 (1)	2 (16)	3 (5)	8	6	6	6	7	6t	5	4	5	4
Oregon	C	7	5	5	5	5 (1)	2 (6)	2 (3)	9	6	6	6	6	5	5	4	5	4
Oregon	CFP	Not released										9	8	7	6	5	5	
Penn State	AP	2 (23)	2 (6)	2 (5)	2 (5)	3 (5)	7	RV										
Penn State	C	3 (14)	2 (6)	2 (4)	2 (3)	2 (3)	6	22							RV	RV	RV	
Penn State	CFP	Not released																
Purdue	AP																	
Purdue	C																	
Purdue	CFP	Not released																
Rutgers	AP																	
Rutgers	C																	
Rutgers	CFP	Not released																
UCLA	AP																	
UCLA	C																	
UCLA	CFP	Not released																
USC	AP	RV	RV	RV	25	21	RV	RV	20	RV	23	20	17	16	19	17	16	20
USC	C	RV	RV	RV	RV	22	RV	RV	21	RV	RV	21	18	16	20	17	16	21
USC	CFP	Not released										19	17	15	17	16	16	
Washington	AP							RV	RV		RV	24		RV	RV	RV	RV	RV
Washington	C	RV	RV	RV	RV	RV	RV	RV	RV	RV	RV	RV	RV	RV	RV	RV	RV	RV
Washington	CFP	Not released										23						
Wisconsin	AP																	
Wisconsin	C																	
Wisconsin	CFP	Not released																

Legend
	Improvement in ranking
	Drop in ranking
	Not ranked previous week
	No change in ranking from previous week
RV	Received votes but were not ranked in Top 25 of poll
т	Tied with team above or below also with this symbol

== Schedule ==
Index to colors and formatting
Big Ten member won
Big Ten member lost
Big Ten teams in **bold**

=== Regular season schedule ===
==== Week 1 ====
Date	Time	Visiting team	Home team	Site	TV	Result	Attendance	Ref.
August 28	6:00 p.m.	Ohio	**Rutgers**	SHI Stadium • Piscataway, NJ	BTN	**W** 34–31	46,907	
August 28	8:00 p.m.	Buffalo	**Minnesota**	Huntington Bank Stadium • Minneapolis, MN	FS1	**W** 23–10	47,774	
August 28	9:00 p.m.	**Nebraska**	Cincinnati	Arrowhead Stadium • Kansas City, MO	ESPN	**W** 20–17	72,884	
August 28	9:00 p.m.	Miami (OH)	**Wisconsin**	Camp Randall Stadium • Madison, WI	BTN	**W** 17–0	65,952	
August 29	7:00 p.m.	Western Michigan	**Michigan State**	Spartan Stadium • East Lansing, MI	FS1	**W** 23–6	71,657	
August 29	7:30 p.m.	Western Illinois	No. 12 **Illinois**	Memorial Stadium • Champaign, IL	Peacock	**W** 52–3	56,040	
August 30	12:00 p.m.	Florida Atlantic	**Maryland**	SECU Stadium • College Park, MD	BTN	**W** 39–7	35,067	
August 30	12:00 p.m.	Ball State	**Purdue**	Ross-Ade Stadium • West Lafayette, IN	BTN	**W** 31–0	53,994	
August 30	12:00 p.m.	**Northwestern**	Tulane	Yulman Stadium • New Orleans, LA	ESPNU	**L** 3–23	22,103	
August 30	12:00 p.m.	No. 1 Texas	No. 3 **Ohio State**	Ohio Stadium • Columbus, OH (College GameDay/Big Noon Kickoff)	FOX	**W** 14–7	107,524	
August 30	2:30 p.m.	Old Dominion	No. 20 **Indiana**	Memorial Stadium • Bloomington, IN	FS1	**W** 27–14	47,109	
August 30	3:30 p.m.	Nevada	No. 2 **Penn State**	Beaver Stadium • University Park, PA	CBS	**W** 46–11	106,915	
August 30	4:00 p.m.	No. 2 (FCS) Montana State	No. 7 **Oregon**	Autzen Stadium • Eugene, OR	BTN	**W** 59–13	57,257	
August 30	6:00 p.m.	Albany	**Iowa**	Kinnick Stadium • Iowa City, IA	FS1	**W** 34–7	69,250	
August 30	7:30 p.m.	Missouri State	**USC**	Los Angeles Memorial Coliseum • Los Angeles, CA	BTN	**W** 73–13	62,841	
August 30	7:30 p.m.	New Mexico	No. 14 **Michigan**	Michigan Stadium • Ann Arbor, MI	NBC	**W** 34–17	110,648	
August 30	11:00 p.m.	Utah	**UCLA**	Rose Bowl • Pasadena, CA	FOX	**L** 10–43	35,032	
August 30	11:00 p.m.	Colorado State	**Washington**	Husky Stadium • Seattle, WA	BTN	**W** 38–21	67,778	
^{#}Rankings from AP Poll released prior to game. All times are in Eastern Time.

==== Week 2 ====
Date	Time	Visiting team	Home team	Site	TV	Result	Attendance	Ref.
September 5	7:30 p.m.	Northern Illinois	**Maryland**	SECU Stadium • College Park, MD	BTN	**W** 20–9	35,331	
September 5	7:30 p.m.	Western Illinois	**Northwestern**	Martin Stadium • Evanston, IL	BTN	**W** 42–7	9,647	
September 6	12:00 p.m.	**Iowa**	No. 16 Iowa State	Jack Trice Stadium • Ames, IA (Cy-Hawk Trophy)	FOX	**L** 13–16	61,500	
September 6	12:00 p.m.	Kennesaw State	No. 23 **Indiana**	Memorial Stadium • Bloomington, IN	FS1	**W** 56–9	43,801	
September 6	12:00 p.m.	Florida International	No. 2 **Penn State**	Beaver Stadium • University Park, PA	BTN	**W** 34–0	103,817	
September 6	12:00 p.m.	Northwestern State	**Minnesota**	Huntington Bank Stadium • Minneapolis, MN	BTN	**W** 66–0	42,447	
September 6	12:00 p.m.	No. 11 **Illinois**	Duke	Wallace Wade Stadium • Durham, NC	ESPN	**W** 45–19	23,893	
September 6	3:30 p.m.	Oklahoma State	No. 6 **Oregon**	Autzen Stadium • Eugene, OR	CBS	**W** 69–3	57,266	
September 6	3:30 p.m.	Grambling	No. 1 **Ohio State**	Ohio Stadium • Columbus, OH	BTN	**W** 70–0	100,624	
September 6	3:30 p.m.	Miami (OH)	**Rutgers**	SHI Stadium • Piscataway, NJ	Peacock	**W** 45–17	45,981	
September 6	4:00 p.m.	Middle Tennessee	**Wisconsin**	Camp Randall Stadium • Madison, WI	FS1	**W** 42–10	70,368	
September 6	7:30 p.m.	Boston College	**Michigan State**	Spartan Stadium • East Lansing, MI	NBC	**W** 42–40 ^{2OT}	70,510	
September 6	7:30 p.m.	Georgia Southern	**USC**	Los Angeles Memorial Coliseum • Los Angeles, CA	FS1	**W** 59–20	66,514	
September 6	7:30 p.m.	Akron	**Nebraska**	Memorial Stadium • Lincoln, NE	BTN	**W** 68–0	86,439	
September 6	7:30 p.m.	No. 14 (FCS) Southern Illinois	**Purdue**	Ross-Ade Stadium • West Lafayette, IN	BTN	**W** 34–17	54,663	
September 6	7:30 p.m.	No. 15 **Michigan**	No. 18 Oklahoma	Gaylord Family Oklahoma Memorial Stadium • Norman, OK	ABC	**L** 13–24	84,107	
September 6	8:00 p.m.	**UCLA**	UNLV	Allegiant Stadium • Las Vegas, NV	CBSSN	**L** 23–30	36,117	
September 6	11:00 p.m.	No. 8 (FCS) UC Davis	**Washington**	Husky Stadium • Seattle, WA	BTN	**W** 70–10	65,421	
^{#}Rankings from AP Poll released prior to game. All times are in Eastern Time.

==== Week 3 ====
Date	Time	Visiting team	Home team	Site	TV	Result	Attendance	Ref.
September 12	6:30 p.m.	Indiana State	No. 22 **Indiana**	Memorial Stadium • Bloomington, IN	BTN	**W** 73–0	46,219	
September 12	10:00 p.m.	New Mexico	**UCLA**	Rose Bowl • Pasadena, CA	BTN	**L** 10–35	36,117	
September 13	12:00 p.m.	No. 4 **Oregon**	**Northwestern**	Martin Stadium • Evanston, IL	FOX	**ORE** 34–14	12,023	
September 13	12:00 p.m.	Houston Christian	**Nebraska**	Memorial Stadium • Lincoln, NE	FS1	**W** 59–7	86,292	
September 13	12:00 p.m.	Central Michigan	No. 23 **Michigan**	Michigan Stadium • Ann Arbor, MI	BTN	**W** 63–3	110,740	
September 13	12:00 p.m.	Towson	**Maryland**	SECU Stadium • College Park, MD	Peacock	**W** 44–17	36,780	
September 13	12:00 p.m.	**Wisconsin**	No. 19 Alabama	Bryant-Denny Stadium • Tuscaloosa, AL	ABC	**L** 14–38	100,077	
September 13	3:30 p.m. (Note: The game was initially scheduled for 3:30 p.m. EST, but was postponed until 6:45 p.m. EST due to thunderstorms.)	**USC**	**Purdue**	Ross-Ade Stadium • West Lafayette, IN	CBS	**USC** 33–17	58,065	
September 13	3:30 p.m.	No. 11 (FCS) Villanova	No. 2 **Penn State**	Beaver Stadium • University Park, PA	FS1	**W** 52–6	109,516	
September 13	3:30 p.m.	Norfolk State	**Rutgers**	SHI Stadium • Piscataway, NJ	BTN	**W** 60–10	41,011	
September 13	3:30 p.m.	Youngstown State	**Michigan State**	Spartan Stadium • East Lansing, MI	BTN	**W** 41–24	71,301	
September 13	7:00 p.m.	Western Michigan	No. 9 **Illinois**	Memorial Stadium • Champaign, IL	FS1	**W** 38–0	60,670	
September 13	7:00 p.m.	Ohio	No. 1 **Ohio State**	Ohio Stadium • Columbus, OH	Peacock	**W** 37–9	105,765	
September 13	7:30 p.m.	Massachusetts	**Iowa**	Kinnick Stadium • Iowa City, IA	BTN	**W** 47–7	69,250	
September 13	10:30 p.m.	**Minnesota**	California	California Memorial Stadium • Berkeley, CA	ESPN	**L** 14–27	38,556	
^{#}Rankings from AP Poll released prior to game. All times are in Eastern Time.

Date	Bye Week
September 13	Washington

==== Week 4 ====
Date	Time	Visiting team	Home team	Site	TV	Result	Attendance	Ref.
September 19	8:00 p.m.	**Iowa**	**Rutgers**	SHI Stadium • Piscataway, NJ	FOX	**IOWA** 38–28	55,942	
September 20	12:00 p.m.	**Maryland**	**Wisconsin**	Camp Randall Stadium • Madison, WI	NBC	**MARY** 27–10	68,547	
September 20	3:00 p.m.	Oregon State	No. 6 **Oregon**	Autzen Stadium • Eugene, OR (Platypus Trophy)	BTN	**W** 41–7	58,571	
September 20	3:30 p.m.	**Purdue**	No. 24 Notre Dame	Notre Dame Stadium • Notre Dame, IN (Shillelagh Trophy)	NBC	**L** 30–56	77,622	
September 20	3:30 p.m.	No. 21 **Michigan**	**Nebraska**	Memorial Stadium • Lincoln, NE	CBS	**MICH** 30–27	87,278	
September 20	7:30 p.m.	**Washington**	Washington State	Martin Stadium • Pullman, WA (Apple Cup)	CBS	**W** 59–24	32,952	
September 20	7:30 p.m.	No. 9 **Illinois**	No. 19 **Indiana**	Memorial Stadium • Bloomington, IN (rivalry)	NBC	**IU** 63–10	56,088	
September 20	11:00 p.m.	**Michigan State**	No. 25 **USC**	Los Angeles Memorial Coliseum • Los Angeles, CA	FOX	**USC** 45–31	67,614	
^{#}Rankings from AP Poll released prior to game. All times are in Eastern Time.

Date	Bye Week				
September 20	Minnesota	Northwestern	#1 Ohio State	#2 Penn State	UCLA

==== Week 5 ====
Date	Time	Visiting team	Home team	Site	TV	Result	Attendance	Ref.
September 27	12:00 p.m.	**Rutgers**	**Minnesota**	Huntington Bank Stadium • Minneapolis, MN	BTN	**MINN** 31–28	46,234	
September 27†	12:00 p.m.	No. 21 **USC**	No. 23 **Illinois**	Memorial Stadium • Champaign, IL	FOX	**ILL** 34–32	60,670	
September 27†	3:30 p.m.	No. 11 **Indiana**	**Iowa**	Kinnick Stadium • Iowa City, IA	Peacock	**IU** 20–15	69,250	
September 27	3:30 p.m.	No. 1 **Ohio State**	**Washington**	Husky Stadium • Seattle, WA	CBS	**OSU** 24–6	72,485	
September 27	3:30 p.m.	**UCLA**	**Northwestern**	Martin Stadium • Evanston, IL	BTN	**NW** 17–14	12,023	
September 27	7:30 p.m.	No. 6 **Oregon**	No. 3 **Penn State**	Beaver Stadium • University Park, PA	NBC	**ORE** 30–24 ^{2OT}	111,015	
^{†}Homecoming. ^{#}Rankings from AP Poll released prior to game. All times are in Eastern Time.

Date	Bye Week					
September 27	Maryland	#19 Michigan	Michigan State	Nebraska	Purdue	Wisconsin

==== Week 6 ====
Date	Time	Visiting team	Home team	Site	TV	Result	Attendance	Ref.
October 4†	12:00 p.m.	**Wisconsin**	No. 20 **Michigan**	Michigan Stadium • Ann Arbor, MI	FOX	**MICH** 24–10	111,070	
October 4	12:00 p.m.	No. 22 **Illinois**	**Purdue**	Ross-Ade Stadium • West Lafayette, IN (Purdue Cannon)	BTN	**ILL** 43–27	56,551	
October 4	3:30 p.m.	No. 7 **Penn State**	**UCLA**	Rose Bowl • Pasadena, CA	CBS	**UCLA** 42–37	39,256	
October 4	3:30 p.m.	**Washington**	**Maryland**	SECU Stadium • College Park, MD	BTN	**WASH** 24–20	46,185	
October 4†	3:30 p.m.	Louisiana–Monroe	**Northwestern**	Martin Stadium • Evanston, IL	BTN	**W** 42–7	12,023	
October 4†	4:00 p.m.	**Michigan State**	**Nebraska**	Memorial Stadium • Lincoln, NE	FS1	**NEB** 38–27	86,496	
October 4†	7:30 p.m.	**Minnesota**	No. 1 **Ohio State**	Ohio Stadium • Columbus, OH	NBC	**OSU** 42–3	105,114	
^{†}Homecoming. ^{#}Rankings from AP Poll released prior to game. All times are in Eastern Time.

Date	Bye Week				
October 4	#8 Indiana	Iowa	#2 Oregon	Rutgers	USC

==== Week 7 ====
Date	Time	Visiting team	Home team	Site	TV	Result	Attendance	Ref.
October 10†	9:00 p.m.	**Rutgers**	**Washington**	Husky Stadium • Seattle, WA	FS1	**WASH** 38–19	63,743	
October 11	12:00 p.m.	No. 1 **Ohio State**	No. 17 **Illinois**	Gies Memorial Stadium • Champaign, IL (Illibuck)	FOX	**OSU** 34–16	60,670	
October 11†	12:00 p.m.	**UCLA**	**Michigan State**	Spartan Stadium • East Lansing, MI	BTN	**UCLA** 38–13	72,109	
October 11	3:30 p.m.	No. 7 **Indiana**	No. 3 **Oregon**	Autzen Stadium • Eugene, OR	CBS	**IND** 30–20	59,625	
October 11†	3:30 p.m.	**Northwestern**	**Penn State**	Beaver Stadium • University Park, PA	FS1	**NW** 22–21	108,121	
October 11	3:30 p.m.	**Nebraska**	**Maryland**	SECU Stadium • College Park, MD	BTN	**NEB** 34–31	39,623	
October 11†	7:00 p.m.	**Iowa**	**Wisconsin**	Camp Randall Stadium • Madison, WI (Heartland Trophy)	FS1	**IOWA** 37–0	76,064	
October 11	7:30 p.m.	No. 15 **Michigan**	**USC**	Los Angeles Memorial Coliseum • Los Angeles, CA	NBC	**USC** 31–13	75,500	
October 11†	7:30 p.m.	**Purdue**	**Minnesota**	Huntington Bank Stadium • Minneapolis, MN	BTN	**MINN** 27–20	49,254	
^{†}Homecoming. ^{#}Rankings from AP Poll released prior to game. All times are in Eastern Time.

==== Week 8 ====
Date	Time	Visiting team	Home team	Site	TV	Result	Attendance	Ref.
October 17	8:00 p.m.	No. 25 **Nebraska**	**Minnesota**	Huntington Bank Stadium • Minneapolis, MN ($5 Bits of Broken Chair)	FOX	**MINN** 24–6	48,549	
October 18	12:00 p.m.	**Washington**	**Michigan**	Michigan Stadium • Ann Arbor, MI	FOX	**MICH** 24–7	110,701	
October 18	3:00 p.m.	**Purdue**	**Northwestern**	Martin Stadium • Evanston, IL	BTN	**NW** 19–0	12,023	
October 18	3:30 p.m.	No. 1 **Ohio State**	**Wisconsin**	Camp Randall Stadium • Madison, WI	CBS	**OSU** 34–0	72,795	
October 18†	3:30 p.m.	**Michigan State**	No. 3 **Indiana**	Memorial Stadium • Bloomington, IN (Old Brass Spittoon)	Peacock	**IU** 38–13	55,165	
October 18†	6:30 p.m.	No. 8 **Oregon**	**Rutgers**	SHI Stadium • Piscataway, NJ	BTN	**ORE** 56–10	53,127	
October 18	7:00 p.m.	**Penn State**	**Iowa**	Kinnick Stadium • Iowa City, IA	Peacock	**IOWA** 25–24	69,250	
October 18†	7:00 p.m.	**Maryland**	**UCLA**	Rose Bowl • Pasadena, CA	FS1	**UCLA** 20–17	35,561	
October 18†	7:30 p.m.	No. 20 **USC**	No. 13 Notre Dame	Notre Dame Stadium • Notre Dame, IN (Jeweled Shillelagh)	NBC	**L** 24–34	77,622	
^{†}Homecoming. ^{#}Rankings from AP Poll released prior to game. All times are in Eastern Time.

Date	Bye Week
October 18	Illinois

==== Week 9 ====
Date	Time	Visiting team	Home team	Site	TV	Result	Attendance	Ref.
October 25	12:00 p.m.	**UCLA**	No. 2 **Indiana**	Memorial Stadium • Bloomington, IN	FOX	**IU** 56–6	54,867	
October 25	12:00 p.m.	**Northwestern**	**Nebraska**	Memorial Stadium • Lincoln, NE	FS1	**NEB** 28–21	86,401	
October 25†	12:00 p.m.	**Rutgers**	**Purdue**	Ross-Ade Stadium • West Lafayette, IN	BTN	**RUT** 27–24	55,289	
October 25	3:30 p.m.	**Minnesota**	**Iowa**	Kinnick Stadium • Iowa City, IA (Floyd of Rosedale)	CBS	**IA** 41–3	69,250	
October 25	3:30 p.m.	No. 23 **Illinois**	**Washington**	Husky Stadium • Seattle, WA	BTN	**WASH** 42–25	68,630	
October 25†	7:00 p.m.	**Wisconsin**	No. 6 **Oregon**	Autzen Stadium • Eugene, OR	FS1	**ORE** 21–7	58,940	
October 25	7:30 p.m.	No. 25 **Michigan**	**Michigan State**	Spartan Stadium • East Lansing, MI (Paul Bunyan Trophy)	NBC	**MICH** 31–20	75,085	
^{†}Homecoming. ^{#}Rankings from AP Poll released prior to game. All times are in Eastern Time.

Date	Bye Week			
October 25	**Maryland**	No. 1 **Ohio State**	**Penn State**	**USC**

==== Week 10 ====
Date	Time	Visiting team	Home team	Site	TV	Result	Attendance	Ref.
November 1	12:00 p.m.	**Penn State**	No. 1 **Ohio State**	Ohio Stadium • Columbus, OH (rivalry)	FOX	**OSU** 38—14	105,517	
November 1	12:00 p.m.	**Rutgers**	**Illinois**	Memorial Stadium • Champaign, IL	NBC	**ILL** 35–13	60,670	
November 1†	3:30 p.m.	No. 2 **Indiana**	**Maryland**	SECU Stadium • College Park, MD	CBS	**IU** 55–10	46,185	
November 1	3:30 p.m.	**Michigan State**	**Minnesota**	Huntington Bank Stadium • Minneapolis, MN	BTN	**MINN** 23–20 ^{OT}	45,339	
November 1	7:00 p.m.	**Purdue**	No. 21 **Michigan**	Michigan Stadium • Ann Arbor, MI	BTN	**MICH** 21–16	110,527	
November 1	7:30 p.m.	No. 23 **USC**	**Nebraska**	Memorial Stadium • Lincoln, NE	NBC	**USC** 21–17	86,529	
^{†}Homecoming. ^{#}Rankings from AP Poll released prior to game. All times are in Eastern Time.

Date	Bye Week					
November 1	Iowa	Northwestern	No. 6 Oregon	UCLA	Washington	Wisconsin

==== Week 11 ====
Date	Time	Visiting team	Home team	Site	TV	Result	Attendance	Ref.
November 7	9:00 p.m.	**Northwestern**	No. 19 **USC**	Los Angeles Memorial Coliseum • Los Angeles, CA	FOX	**USC** 38–17	67,179	
November 8	12:00 p.m.	No. 2 **Indiana**	**Penn State**	Beaver Stadium • University Park, PA	FOX	**IU** 27–24	105,231	
November 8	1:00 p.m.	No. 1 **Ohio State**	**Purdue**	Ross-Ade Stadium • West Lafayette, IN	BTN	**OSU** 34–10	57,701	
November 8	2:30 p.m.	**Maryland**	**Rutgers**	SHI Stadium • Piscataway, NJ	FS1	**RUTG** 35–20	41,032	
November 8	3:30 p.m.	No. 9 **Oregon**	No. 20 **Iowa**	Kinnick Stadium • Iowa City, IA	CBS	**ORE** 18–16	69,250	
November 8	4:30 p.m.	No. 23 **Washington**	**Wisconsin**	Camp Randall Stadium • Madison, WI	BTN	**WISC** 13–10	71,217	
November 8	9:00 p.m.	**Nebraska**	**UCLA**	Rose Bowl • Pasadena, CA	FOX	**NEB** 28–21	44,481	
^{#}Rankings from College Football Playoff. All times are in Eastern Time.

Date	Bye Week			
November 8	Illinois	No. 21 Michigan	Michigan State	Minnesota

==== Week 12 ====
Date	Time	Visiting team	Home team	Site	TV	Result	Attendance	Ref.
November 14	9:00 p.m.	**Minnesota**	No. 7 **Oregon**	Autzen Stadium • Eugene, OR	FOX	**ORE** 42–13	58,830	
November 15	12:00 p.m.	No. 18 **Michigan**	**Northwestern**	Wrigley Field • Chicago, IL (George Jewett Trophy)	FOX	**MICH** 24–22	38,223	
November 15	12:00 p.m.	**Wisconsin**	No. 2 **Indiana**	Memorial Stadium • Bloomington, IN	BTN	**IU** 31–7	55,042	
November 15†	3:30 p.m.	**Iowa**	No. 17 **USC**	Los Angeles Memorial Coliseum • Los Angeles, CA	BTN	**USC** 26–21	65,216	
November 15	3:30 p.m.	**Penn State**	**Michigan State**	Spartan Stadium • East Lansing, MI (Land Grant Trophy)	CBS	**PSU** 28–10	61,671	
November 15	3:30 p.m.	**Maryland**	**Illinois**	Memorial Stadium • Champaign, IL	FS1	**ILL** 24–6	56,416	
November 15	7:00 p.m.	**Purdue**	**Washington**	Husky Stadium • Seattle, WA	FS1	**WASH** 49–13	67,229	
November 15	7:30 p.m.	**UCLA**	No. 1 **Ohio State**	Ohio Stadium • Columbus, OH	NBC	**OSU** 48–10	104,168	
^{†}Homecoming. ^{#}Rankings from College Football Playoff. All times are in Eastern Time.

Date	Bye Week	
November 15	Nebraska	Rutgers

==== Week 13 ====
Date	Time	Visiting team	Home team	Site	TV	Result	Attendance	Ref.
November 22	12:00 p.m.	**Rutgers**	No. 1 **Ohio State**	Ohio Stadium • Columbus, OH	FOX	**OSU** 42–9	100,023	
November 22	12:00 p.m.	**Minnesota**	**Northwestern**	Wrigley Field • Chicago, IL	BTN	**NW** 38–35	15,323	
November 22	3:30 p.m.	**Michigan State**	**Iowa**	Kinnick Stadium • Iowa City, IA	FS1	**IA** 20–17	69,250	
November 22	3:30 p.m.	No. 16 **USC**	No. 6 **Oregon**	Autzen Stadium • Eugene, OR	CBS	**ORE** 42–27	59,588	
November 22	4:00 p.m.	No. 18 **Michigan**	**Maryland**	SECU Stadium • College Park, MD	BTN	**MICH** 45–20	46,185	
November 22	7:00 p.m.	**Nebraska**	**Penn State**	Beaver Stadium • University Park, PA	NBC	**PSU** 37–10	105,038	
November 22	7:30 p.m.	**Illinois**	**Wisconsin**	Camp Randall Stadium • Madison, WI	BTN	**WIS** 27–10	67,876	
November 22	10:30 p.m.	**Washington**	**UCLA**	Rose Bowl • Pasadena, CA	NBC	**WASH** 48–14	38,201	
^{#}Rankings from College Football Playoff. All times are in Eastern Time.

Date	Bye Week	
November 22	No. 2 Indiana	Purdue

==== Week 14 ====
Date	Time	Visiting team	Home team	Site	TV	Result	Attendance	Ref.
November 28	12:00 p.m.	**Iowa**	**Nebraska**	Memorial Stadium • Lincoln, NE (Heroes Game)	CBS	**IA** 40–16	86,410	
November 28	7:30 p.m.	No. 2 **Indiana**	**Purdue**	Ross-Ade Stadium • West Lafayette, IN (Old Oaken Bucket)	NBC	**IU** 56–3	59,807	
November 29	12:00 p.m.	No. 1 **Ohio State**	No. 15 **Michigan**	Michigan Stadium • Ann Arbor, MI (The Game)	FOX	**OSU** 27–9	111,373	
November 29	3:30 p.m.	**Wisconsin**	**Minnesota**	Huntington Bank Stadium • Minneapolis, MN (Paul Bunyan's Axe)	FS1	**MIN** 17–7	46,038	
November 29	3:30 p.m.	**Penn State**	**Rutgers**	SHI Stadium • Piscataway, NJ	BTN	**PSU** 40–36	55,212	
November 29	3:30 p.m.	No. 5 **Oregon**	**Washington**	Husky Stadium • Seattle, WA (Oregon–Washington Rivalry)	CBS	**ORE** 26–14	72,376	
November 29	7:00 p.m.	**Maryland**	**Michigan State**	Ford Field • Detroit, MI	FS1	**MSU** 38–28	30,317	
November 29	7:30 p.m.	**Northwestern**	**Illinois**	Memorial Stadium • Champaign, IL (Land of Lincoln Trophy)	FOX	**ILL** 20–13	53,317	
November 29	7:30 p.m.	**UCLA**	No. 19 **USC**	Los Angeles Memorial Coliseum • Los Angeles, CA (Victory Bell)	NBC	**USC** 29–10	69,614	
^{#}Rankings from College Football Playoff. All times are in Eastern Time.

==== Big Ten Championship Game ====
Date	Time	Visiting team	Home team	Site	TV	Result	Attendance	Ref.
December 6	8:00 p.m.	No. 2 **Indiana**	No. 1 **Ohio State**	Lucas Oil Stadium • Indianapolis, IN (Big Ten Championship Game)	FOX	**IU** 13-10	68,214	
^{#}Rankings from College Football Playoff. All times are in Eastern Time.

== Postseason ==
=== Bowl games ===
Legend
Big Ten win
Big Ten loss

Bowl game	Date	Site	Television	Time (EST)	Big Ten team	Opponent	Score	Attendance	Ref.
LA Bowl	December 13, 2025	SoFi Stadium • Inglewood, CA	ABC	8:00 PM	Washington	Boise State	W 38–10	23,269	
GameAbove Sports Bowl	December 26, 2025	Ford Field • Detroit, MI	ESPN	1:00 PM	Northwestern	Central Michigan	W 34–7	27,857	
Rate Bowl	December 26, 2025	Chase Field • Phoenix, AZ	ESPN	4:30 PM	Minnesota	New Mexico	W 20–17 (OT)	27,439	
Pinstripe Bowl	December 27, 2025	Yankee Stadium • Bronx, NY	ESPN	12:00 PM	Penn State	Clemson	W 22–10	41,101	
Music City Bowl	December 30, 2025	Nissan Stadium • Nashville, TN	ESPN	5:30 PM	Illinois	Tennessee	W 30–28	52,815	
Alamo Bowl	December 30, 2025	Alamodome • San Antonio, TX	ESPN	9:00 PM	USC	TCU	L 27–30 (OT)	54,751	
ReliaQuest Bowl	December 31, 2025	Raymond James Stadium • Tampa, FL	ESPN	12:00 PM	Iowa	Vanderbilt	W 34–27	35,382	
Citrus Bowl	December 31, 2025	Camping World Stadium • Orlando, FL	ABC	3:00 PM	Michigan	Texas	L 27–41	47,316	
Las Vegas Bowl	December 31, 2025	Allegiant Stadium • Las Vegas, NV	ESPN	3:30 PM	Nebraska	Utah	L 22–44	38,879	
College Football Playoff - First Round
College Football Playoff	December 20, 2025	Autzen Stadium • Eugene, OR	TNT	7:30 PM	No. 5 Oregon	No. 12 James Madison	W 51–34	55,125	
College Football Playoff - Quarterfinals
Cotton Bowl	December 31, 2025	AT&T Stadium • Arlington, TX	ESPN	7:30 PM	No. 2 Ohio State	No. 10 Miami (FL)	L 14–24	71,323	
Orange Bowl	January 1, 2026	Hard Rock Stadium • Miami Gardens, FL	ESPN	12:00 PM	No. 5 Oregon	No. 4 Texas Tech	W 23–0	65,021	
Rose Bowl	January 1, 2026	Rose Bowl • Pasadena, CA	ESPN	4:00 PM	No. 1 Indiana	No. 9 Alabama	W 38–3	90,278	
College Football Playoff - Semifinals
Peach Bowl	January 9, 2026	Mercedes-Benz Stadium • Atlanta, GA	ESPN	7:30 PM	No. 1 Indiana	No. 5 Oregon	IU 56–22	75,604	
College Football Playoff - National Championship Game
CFP National Championship	January 19, 2026	Hard Rock Stadium • Miami Gardens, FL	ESPN	7:30 PM	No. 1 Indiana	No. 10 Miami (FL)	W 27–21	67,227	

== Big Ten records vs other conferences ==
2025–2026 records against non-conference foes

Power 4 conferences	Record
ACC	2–1
Big 12	2–2
Notre Dame	0–2
SEC	1–2
Power 4 total	5–7
Other FBS conferences	Record
American	1–1
CUSA	3–0
Independents (Excluding Notre Dame)	0–0
MAC	9–0
Mountain West	3–2
Pac-12	2–0
Sun Belt	3–0
Other FBS total	21–3
FCS opponents	Record
Football Championship Subdivision	16–0
Total non-conference record	42–10

Post season

Power 4 conferences	Record
ACC	2–1
Big 12	1–2
Notre Dame	0–0
SEC	3–1
Power 4 total	6-4
Other FBS conferences	Record
American	0–0
CUSA	0–0
Independents (Excluding Notre Dame)	0–0
MAC	1–0
Mountain West	2–0
Pac-12	0–0
Sun Belt	1–0
Other FBS total	4–0
Total bowl record	10-4

== Awards and honors ==
=== Player of the Week Honors ===
Week	Offensive			Defensive			Special Teams			Freshman		
Week	Player	Position	Team	Player	Position	Team	Player	Position	Team	Player	Position	Team
Week 1 (September 1)	Jayden Maiava	QB	USC	Preston Zachman	S	WIS	Hank Beatty	WR/PR	ILL	Malik Washington	QB	MD
Week 1 (September 1)	Jonah Coleman	RB	WAS	Preston Zachman	S	WIS	Hank Beatty	WR/PR	ILL	Malik Washington	QB	MD
Week 2 (September 8)	Aidan Chiles	QB	MSU	Jordan Hall	LB	MSU	Spencer Porath	K	PUR	Julian Sayin	QB	OSU
Week 2 (September 8)	Jonah Coleman (2)	RB	WAS	Jordan Hall	LB	MSU	Spencer Porath	K	PUR	Julian Sayin	QB	OSU
Week 3 (September 15)	Omar Cooper Jr.	WR	IU	Jerry Mixon	LB	ORE	Kaden Wetjen	WR	IA	Bryce Underwood	QB	MICH
Week 4 (September 22)	Fernando Mendoza	QB	IU	Daniel Wingate	LB	MD	Kaden Wetjen (2)	WR	IA	Malik Washington (2)	QB	MD
Week 4 (September 22)	Demond Williams Jr.	QB	WASH	Daniel Wingate	LB	MD	Dominic Zvada	K	MICH	Malik Washington (2)	QB	MD
Week 5 (September 29)	Luke Altmyer	QB	ILL	Caden Curry	DE	OSU	David Olano	K	ILL	Drake Lindsey	QB	MIN
Week 5 (September 29)	Dante Moore	QB	ORE	Caden Curry	DE	OSU	David Olano	K	ILL	Drake Lindsey	QB	MIN
Week 6 (October 6)	Nico Iamaleava	QB	UCLA	DeShon Singleton	S	NEB	David Olano (2)	K	ILL	Julian Sayin (2)	QB	OSU
Week 7 (October 13)	Demond Williams Jr. (2)	QB	WASH	Aiden Fisher	LB	IU	Jack Olsen	K	NW	King Miller	RB	USC
Week 8 (October 20)	Julian Sayin	QB	OSU	Xavier Nwankpa	DB	IA	Mateen Bhaghani	K	UCLA	Julian Sayin (3)	QB	OSU
Week 9 (October 27)	Justice Haynes	RB	MICH	Jimmy Rolder	LB	MICH	Kenneth Williams	KR	Nebraska	Jordon Davison	RB	ORE
Week 9 (October 27)	Denzel Boston	WR	WASH	Jimmy Rolder	LB	MICH	Jai Patel	K	RUT	Jordon Davison	RB	ORE
Week 10 (November 3)	Luke Altmyer (2)	QB	ILL	Arvell Reese	LB	OSU	Ryon Sayeri	K	USC	Julian Sayin (4)	QB	OSU
Week 10 (November 3)	Jordan Marshall	RB	MICH	Arvell Reese	LB	OSU	Ryon Sayeri	K	USC	Julian Sayin (4)	QB	OSU
Week 11 (November 10)	Emmett Johnson	RB	NEB	Cooper Catalano	LB	WIS	Atticus Sappington	K	ORE	TJ Lateef	QB	NEB
Week 11 (November 10)	Emmett Johnson	RB	NEB	Cooper Catalano	LB	WIS	Atticus Sappington	K	ORE	Mason Posa	LB	WIS
Week 12 (November 17)	Fernando Mendoza (2)	QB	IU	Dani Dennis-Sutton	DE	PSU	Ryon Sayeri (2)	K	USC	Andrew Marsh	WR	MICH
Week 12 (November 17)	Kaytron Allen	RB	PSU	Dani Dennis-Sutton	DE	PSU	Ryon Sayeri (2)	K	USC	Andrew Marsh	WR	MICH
Week 13 (November 24)	Preston Stone	QB	NW	Darryl Peterson	DL	WIS	Kaden Wetjen (3)	PR	IA	Bo Jackson	RB	OSU
Week 13 (November 24)	Kaytron Allen (2)	RB	PSU	Darryl Peterson	DL	WIS	Kaden Wetjen (3)	PR	IA	Bo Jackson	RB	OSU
Week 14 (December 1)	Kaytron Allen (3)	RB	PSU	John Nestor	DB	MIN	Alante Brown	KR/WR	MSU	Alessio Milivojevic	QB	MSU
Week 14 (December 1)	Kaytron Allen (3)	RB	PSU	John Nestor	DB	MIN	Atticus Sappington (2)	K	ORE	Alessio Milivojevic	QB	MSU

=== Big Ten individual awards ===
The following individuals won the conference's annual player and coach awards:

Award	Player	School
Graham–George Offensive Player of the Year	Fernando Mendoza	Indiana
Griese–Brees Quarterback of the Year	Fernando Mendoza	Indiana
Richter–Howard Receiver of the Year	Jeremiah Smith	Ohio State
Ameche–Dayne Running Back of the Year	Emmett Johnson	Nebraska
Kwalick–Clark Tight End of the Year	Kenyon Sadiq	Oregon
Rimington–Pace Offensive Lineman of the Year	Carter Smith	Indiana
Nagurski–Woodson Defensive Player of the Year	Caleb Downs	Ohio State
Smith–Brown Defensive Lineman of the Year	Kayden McDonald	Ohio State
Butkus–Fitzgerald Linebacker of the Year	Arvell Reese	Ohio State
Tatum–Woodson Defensive Back of the Year	Caleb Downs	Ohio State
Thompson–Randle El Freshman of the Year	Julian Sayin	Ohio State
Bakken–Andersen Kicker of the Year	Nico Radicic	Indiana
Eddleman–Fields Punter of the Year	Ryan Eckley	Michigan State
Rodgers–Dwight Return Specialist of the Year	Kaden Wetjen	Iowa
Hayes–Schembechler Coach of the Year	Curt Cignetti	Indiana
Dave McClain Coach of the Year	Curt Cignetti	Indiana
Dungy–Thompson Humanitarian Award	Will Shields	Nebraska
Ford–Kinnick Leadership Award	Jack Campbell	Iowa

=== All-Conference Teams ===
2025 Big Ten All-Conference Teams and Awards

Position	Player	Team
First Team Offense (Coaches)
QB	Fernando Mendoza	Indiana
RB	Emmett Johnson	Nebraska
RB	Kaytron Allen	Penn State
WR	Jeremiah Smith	Ohio State
WR	Carnell Tate	Ohio State
WR	Makai Lemon	USC
TE	Kenyon Sadiq	Oregon
TE	Max Klare	Ohio State
C	Logan Jones	Iowa
OG	Beau Stephens	Iowa
OG	Emmanuel Pregnon	Oregon
OT	J. C. Davis	Illinois
OT	Carter Smith	Indiana
First Team Defense (Coaches)
DE	Derrick Moore	Michigan
DE	Anthony Smith	Minnesota
DT	Tyrique Tucker	Indiana
DT	Kayden McDonald	Ohio State
LB	Aiden Fisher	Indiana
LB	Arvell Reese	Ohio State
LB	Sonny Styles	Ohio State
DB	D'Angelo Ponds	Indiana
DB	Louis Moore	Indiana
DB	Caleb Downs	Ohio State
DB	Dillon Thieneman	Oregon
DB	Bishop Fitzgerald	USC
First Team Special Teams (Coaches)
PK	Sean O'Haire	Maryland
P	Ryan Eckley	Michigan State
RS	Kaden Wetjen	Iowa
LS	Mark Langston	Indiana

Position	Player	Team
Second Team Offense (Coaches)
QB	Julian Sayin	Ohio State
RB	Bo Jackson	Ohio State
RB	Antwan Raymond	Rutgers
WR	Omar Cooper Jr.	Indiana
WR	Elijah Sarratt	Indiana
WR	KJ Duff	Rutgers
TE	Lake McRee	USC
TE	Lance Mason	Wisconsin
C	Iapani Laloulu	Oregon
OG	Luke Montgomery	Ohio State
OG	Olaivavega Ioane	Penn State
OT	Caleb Tiernan	Northwestern
OT	Austin Siereveld	Ohio State
Second Team Defense (Coaches)
DE	Gabe Jacas	Illinois
DE	Caden Curry	Ohio State
DT	Aaron Graves	Iowa
DT	Bear Alexander	Oregon
LB	Bryce Boettcher	Oregon
LB	Jimmy Rolder	Michigan
LB	Rolijah Hardy	Indiana
DB	Zach Lutmer	Iowa
DB	Jalen Huskey	Maryland
DB	Robert Fitzgerald	Northwestern
DB	Davison Igbinosun	Ohio State
DB	Brandon Finney Jr.	Oregon
Second Team Special Teams (Coaches)
PK	Nico Radicic	Indiana
P	Bryce McFerson	Maryland
P	Jack McCallister	Purdue
RS	Jonathan Brady	Indiana
LS	Luke Basso	Oregon

Position	Player	Team
Third Team Offense (Coaches)
QB	Jayden Maiava	USC
RB	Justice Haynes	Michigan
RB	Jordan Marshall	Michigan
WR	Hank Beatty	Illinois
WR	Griffin Wilde	Northwestern
WR	Denzel Boston	Washington
TE	Riley Nowakowski	Indiana
TE	Max Bredeson	Michigan
C	Pat Coogan	Indiana
OG	Gio El-Hadi	Michigan
OG	Dave Iuli	Oregon
OT	Gennings Dunker	Iowa
OT	Trevor Lauck	Iowa
Third Team Defense (Coaches)
DE	Teitum Tuioti	Oregon
DE	Dani Dennis-Sutton	Penn State
DT	Rayshaun Benny	Michigan
DT	A'Mauri Washington	Oregon
LB	Mac Uihlein	Northwestern
LB	Mani Powell	Purdue
LB	Mason Posa	Wisconsin
DB	TJ Hall	Iowa
DB	Xavier Nwankpa	Iowa
DB	Zeke Berry	Michigan
DB	Koi Perich	Minnesota
DB	Jermaine Mathews	Ohio State
Third Team Special Teams (Coaches)
PK	Ryon Sayeri	USC
P	Gabriel Nwosu	Penn State
RS	Kenneth Williams	Nebraska
LS	John Ferlmann	Ohio State

Coaches Honorable Mention: ILLINOIS: Josh Gesky, Luke Altmyer, Dylan Rosiek, James Thompson Jr., Matthew Bailey, Miles Scott, Tomiwa Durojaiye, Torrie Cox Jr., Hank Beatty; INDIANA: Roman Hemby, Amare Ferrell, Isaiah Jones, Mikail Kamara, Stephen Daley; IOWA: Hayden Large, Kade Pieper, Kamari Moulton, Karson Sharar, Koen Entringer, Max Llewellyn, Drew Stevens; MARYLAND: Alan Herron, Dorian Fleming, Cam Rice, Daniel Wingate, Dontay Joyner, Jamare Glasker, La'khi Roland; MICHIGAN: Andrew Marsh, Andrew Sprague, Jake Guarnera, Marlin Klein, Brandyn Hillman, Ernest Hausmann, Jaishawn Barham, Jyaire Hill, TJ Metcalf, Dominic Zvada; MICHIGAN STATE: Jack Velling, Nick Marsh, Jordan Hall; MINNESOTA: Jameson Geers, Deven Eastern, Kerry Brown, Maverick Baranowski, Tom Weston; NEBRASKA: Luke Lindenmeyer, Rocco Spindler, Andrew Marshall, Ceyair Wright, Dasan McCullough, DeShon Singleton, Javin Wright, Jacory Barney Jr.; NORTHWESTERN: Caleb Komolafe, Evan Beernsten, Ezomo Oratokhai, Hunter Welcing, Josh Fussell, Michael Kilbane, Jack Olsen, Luke Akers; OHIO STATE: Tegra Tshabola, Will Kacmarek, Jaylen McClain, Kenyatta Jackson, Lorenzo Styles, Tywone Malone, Brandon Inniss, Jayden Fielding; OREGON: Alex Harkey, Dakorien Moore, Dante Moore, Isaiah World, Jamari Johnson, Jordon Davison, Noah Whittington, Jadon Canady, Matayo Uiagalalei, Atticus Sappington; PENN STATE: Drew Shelton, Khalil Dinkins, Nolan Rucci, A.J. Harris, Amare Campbell, King Mack, Zakee Wheatley, Zane Durant, Nicholas Singleton, Ryan Barker; PURDUE: Charles Correa, Tahj Ra-El, Spencer Porath; RUTGERS: Ian Strong, Kwabena Asamoah, Bo Mascoe, Jett Elad, Jai Patel; UCLA: Andre Jordan Jr., Gary Smith III, JonJon Vaughns, Will Karoll; USC: Alani Noa, Ja'Kobi Lane, Justin Tauanuu, King Miller, Tobias Raymond, Walker Lyons, Anthony Lucas, Devan Thompkins, Eric Gentry, Kamari Ramsey; WASHINGTON: Carver Willis, Demond Williams Jr., Jonah Coleman, Alex McLaughlin, Denzel Boston; WISCONSIN: Christian Alliegro, Ricardo Hallman, Vinny Anthony

Position	Player	Team
First Team Offense (Media)
QB	Fernando Mendoza	Indiana
RB	Emmett Johnson	Nebraska
RB	Kaytron Allen	Penn State
WR	Jeremiah Smith	Ohio State
WR	Carnell Tate	Ohio State
WR	Makai Lemon	USC
TE	Kenyon Sadiq	Oregon
TE	Max Klare	Ohio State
C	Logan Jones	Iowa
OG	Olaivavega Ioane	Penn State
OG	Emmanuel Pregnon	Oregon
OT	Gennings Dunker	Iowa
OT	Carter Smith	Indiana
First Team Defense (Media)
DE	Gabe Jacas	Illinois
DE	Caden Curry	Ohio State
DT	Tyrique Tucker	Indiana
DT	Kayden McDonald	Ohio State
LB	Aiden Fisher	Indiana
LB	Arvell Reese	Ohio State
LB	Sonny Styles	Ohio State
DB	D'Angelo Ponds	Indiana
DB	Davison Igbinosun	Ohio State
DB	Caleb Downs	Ohio State
DB	Dillon Thieneman	Oregon
DB	Bishop Fitzgerald	USC
First Team Special Teams (Media)
PK	Nico Radicic	Indiana
P	Ryan Eckley	Michigan State
RS	Kaden Wetjen	Iowa
LS	Mark Langston	Indiana

Position	Player	Team
Second Team Offense (Media)
QB	Julian Sayin	Ohio State
RB	Jordan Marshall	Michigan
RB	Antwan Raymond	Rutgers
WR	Omar Cooper Jr.	Indiana
WR	Elijah Sarratt	Indiana
WR	KJ Duff	Rutgers
TE	Lake McRee	USC
TE	Riley Nowakoswki	Indiana
C	Pat Coogan	Indiana
OG	Luke Montgomery	Ohio State
OG	Beau Stephens	Iowa
OT	J.C. Davis	Illinois
OT	Isaiah World	Oregon
Second Team Defense (Media)
DE	Derrick Moore	Michigan
DE	Anthony Smith	Minnesota
DT	Aaron Graves	Iowa
DT	Bear Alexander	Oregon
LB	Bryce Boettcher	Oregon
LB	Jimmy Rolder	Michigan
LB	Rolijah Hardy	Indiana
DB	Amare Ferrell	Indiana
DB	Jalen Huskey	Maryland
DB	Louis Moore	Indiana
DB	Zeke Berry	Michigan
DB	Koi Perich	Minnesota
Second Team Special Teams (Media)
PK	Sean O'Haire	Maryland
P	Bryce McFerson	Maryland
RS	Kenneth Williams	Nebraska
LS	John Ferlmann	Ohio State

Position	Player	Team
Third Team Offense (Media)
QB	Dante Moore	Oregon
RB	Roman Hemby	Indiana
RB	Bo Jackson	Ohio State
WR	Hank Beatty	Illinois
WR	Ja'Kobi Lane	USC
WR	Denzel Boston	Washington
TE	Jack Velling	Michigan State
TE	Lance Mason	Wisconsin
C	Carson Hinzman	Ohio State
OG	Kade Pieper	Iowa
OG	Tegra Tshabola	Ohio State
OT	Philip Daniels	Ohio State
OT	Austin Siereveld	Ohio State
Third Team Defense (Media)
DE	Teitum Tuioti	Oregon
DE	Dani Dennis-Sutton	Penn State
DT	Rayshaun Benny	Michigan
DT	A'Mauri Washington	Oregon
LB	Mac Uihlein	Northwestern
LB	Amare Campbell	Penn State
LB	Ernest Hausmann	Michigan
LB	Isaiah Jones	Indiana
DB	TJ Hall	Iowa
DB	Zach Lutmer	Iowa
DB	Robert Fitzgerald	Northwestern
DB	Jaylen McClain	Ohio State
DB	Brandon Finney Jr.	Oregon
Third Team Special Teams (Media)
PK	Drew Stevens	Iowa
P	Tom Weston	Minnesota
P	Jack McCallister	Purdue
RS	Jacory Barney Jr.	Nebraska
RS	Jonathan Brady	Indiana
LS	Greg Tarr	Michigan

Media Honorable Mention: ILLINOIS: Josh Gesky, Dylan Rosiek, James Thompson Jr., Juice Clarke, Matthew Bailey, Miles Scott, Tomiwa Durojaiye, Hank Beatty, Lane Hansen, David Olano; INDIANA: Mikail Kamara, Stephen Daley; IOWA: Hayden Large, Jacob Gill, Kamari Moulton, Trevor Lauck, Deshaun Lee, Jonah Pace, Karson Sharar, Max Llewellyn, Xavier Nwankpa, Rhys Dakin; MARYLAND: Alan Herron, Dorian Fleming, Cam Rice, Daniel Wingate, Dontay Joyner, Jamare Glasker, Sidney Stewart, Zahir Mathis, Ethan Gough; MICHIGAN: Andrew Marsh, Andrew Sprague, Gio El-Hadi, Greg Crippen, Jake Guarnera, Justice Haynes, Marlin Klein, Max Bredeson, Brandyn Hillman, Jaishawn Barham, Jyaire Hill, Trey Pierce; MICHIGAN STATE: Matt Gulbin, Nick Marsh, Omari Kelly, Jordan Hall, Wayne Matthews; MINNESOTA: Greg Johnson, Jameson Geers, Kerry Brown, Maverick Baranowski, Alan Soukup; NEBRASKA: Luke Lindenmeyer, Rocco Spindler, Andrew Marshall, Ceyair Wright, DeShon Singleton, Javin Wright; NORTHWESTERN: Caleb Komolafe, Caleb Tiernan, Evan Beernsten, Griffin Wilde, Hunter Welcing, Anto Saka, Braden Turner, Carmine Bastone, Josh Fussell, Michael Kilbane, Luke Akers, Jack Olsen; OHIO STATE: Will Kacmarek, Eddrick Houston, Jermaine Mathews, Kenyatta Jackson, Lorenzo Styles, Payton Pierce, Tywone Malone, Brandon Inniss; OREGON: Alex Harkey, Dakorien Moore, Dave Iuli, Iapani Laloulu, Jamari Johnson, Malik Benson, Noah Whittington, Aaron Flowers, Jadon Canady, Matayo Uiagalalei, Gary Bryant Jr., Luke Basso, Atticus Sappington; PENN STATE: Drew Shelton, Khalil Dinkins, Nicholas Singleton, Nick Dawkins, A.J. Harris, Amare Campbell, Audavion Collins, King Mack, Zakee Wheatley, Zane Durant, Ryan Barker, Gabriel Nwosu, Nicholas Singleton, Tyler Duzansky; PURDUE: Charles Correa, Mani Powell, Tahj Ra-El, Luke Raab, Michael Jackson III, Spencer Porath; RUTGERS: Ian Strong, Kwabena Asamoah, Bo Mascoe, Dariel Djabome, Jakob Anderson; UCLA: Garrett DiGiorgio, Andre Jordan Jr., JonJon Vaughns, Rodrick Pleasant, Salem Abdul-Wahab, Mateen Bhaghani; USC: Alani Noa, Jayden Maiava, Justin Tauanuu, King Miller, Tobias Raymond, Devan Thompkins, Eric Gentry, Kamari Ramsey, Hank Pepper, Ryon Sayeri; WASHINGTON: Carver Willis, John Mills, Jonah Coleman, Alex McLaughlin, Ephesians Prysock, Tacario Davis, Denzel Boston; WISCONSIN: Joe Brunner, Christian Alliegro, Darryl Peterson, Mason Posa, Mason Reiger, Ricardo Hallman, Vinny Anthony

== Home attendance ==
Team	Stadium	Capacity	Game 1	Game 2	Game 3	Game 4	Game 5	Game 6	Game 7	Game 8	Total	Average	% of capacity
Illinois	Memorial Stadium	60,670	56,040	**60,670†**	**60,670**	**60,670**	**60,670**	56,416	53,317	–	408,453	58,350	96.2%
Indiana	Memorial Stadium	52,626	47,109	43,801	46,219	**56,088†**	**55,165**	**54,867**	**55,042**	–	358,291	51,184	97.3%
Iowa	Kinnick Stadium	69,250	**69,250†**	**69,250**	**69,250**	**69,250**	**69,250**	**69,250**	**69,250**	–	**484,750**	**69,250**	**100.0%**
Maryland	SECU Stadium	46,185	35,067	35,331	36,780	**46,185†**	39,623	**46,185**	**46,185**	–	285,356	40,765	88.3%
Michigan	Michigan Stadium	107,601	**110,648**	**110,740**	**111,070**	**110,701**	**110,517**	**111,373†**	–	–	**665,049**	**110,842**	**103.0%**
Michigan State	Spartan Stadium	75,005	71,657	70,510	71,301	72,109	**75,085†**	61,671	–	–	422,333	70,389	93.8%
Minnesota	Huntington Bank Stadium	50,805	47,774	42,447	46,234	49,254†	48,549	45,339	46,038	–	325,635	46,519	91.6%
Nebraska	Memorial Stadium	85,458	**86,439**	**86,292**	**87,278†**	**86,496**	**86,401**	**86,529**	**86,410**	–	**605,845**	**86,549**	**101.3%**
Northwestern	Northwestern Medicine Field at Martin Stadium (Note: Temporary stadium to be used during the construction of the new Ryan Field, set to open in 2026.)	12,000	9,647	**12,023†**	**12,023**	**12,023**	**12,023**	38,223 (Note: Game played at Wrigley Field. Its listed capacity for baseball is 41,649, but does not reflect changes for football.)	15,323				
Ohio State	Ohio Stadium	102,780	**107,524†**	100,624	**105,765**	**105,114**	**105,517**	**104,168**	100,023	–	**728,735**	**104,105**	**101.3%**
Oregon	Autzen Stadium	54,000	**57,257**	**57,266**	**58,571**	**59,625†**	**58,940**	**58,830**	**59,588**	**55,124**	**465,201**	**58,150**	**107.7%**
Penn State	Beaver Stadium	106,572	**106,915**	103,817	**109,516**	**111,015†**	**108,121**	105,231	105,038	–	**749,653**	**107,093**	**100.5%**
Purdue	Ross–Ade Stadium	61,441	53,984	54,663	58,065	56,551	55,289	57,701	59,807†	–	396,060	56,580	92.1%
Rutgers	SHI Stadium	52,454	46,907	45,981	41,011	**55,942†**	**53,127**	41,032	**55,212**	–	339,212	48,459	92.4%
UCLA	Rose Bowl	80,816	35,032	31,163	39,256	35,561	44,481†	38,201	–	–	223,694	37,282	46.1%
USC	Los Angeles Memorial Coliseum	77,500	62,841	66,514	67,614	75,500†	67,179	65,216	69,614	–	474,478	67,783	87.5%
Washington	Husky Stadium	70,138	67,778	65,421	**72,485†**	63,743	68,630	67,229	**72,376**	–	477,662	68,237	97.3%
Wisconsin	Camp Randall Stadium	76,057	65,952	70,368	68,547	**76,064†**	72,795	71,217	67,876	–	492,819	70,403	92.6%

Bold – At or Exceed capacity
†Season High

== 2026 NFL draft ==
Team	Round 1	Round 2	Round 3	Round 4	Round 5	Round 6	Round 7	Total
Illinois	–	1	–	–	–	1	1	3
Indiana	2	1	1	1	1	1	1	8
Iowa	–	1	1	1	1	1	2	7
Maryland	–	–	1	–	–	–	–	1
Michigan	–	2	1	1	1	–	1	6
Michigan State	–	–	–	–	–	2	–	2
Minnesota	–	–	–	–	–	–	1	1
Nebraska	–	–	–	–	1	–	–	1
Northwestern	–	–	1	–	–	–	1	2
Ohio State	4	3	1	–	1	1	1	11
Oregon	2	–	1	2	–	2	–	7
Penn State	1	–	1	2	3	1	–	8
Purdue	–	–	–	–	–	–	–	–
Rutgers	–	–	–	–	–	–	1	1
UCLA	–	–	–	–	–	–	–	–
USC	1	–	1	–	1	–	–	3
Washington	–	1	1	3	–	1	1	7
Wisconsin	–	–	–	–	–	–	–	–

The following list includes all Big Ten players who were drafted in the 2026 NFL draft

*	compensatory selection
×	#2020 Resolution JC-2A picks selection

Rnd.	Pick	Team	Player	Pos.	College	Notes
1	1	Las Vegas Raiders	Fernando Mendoza	QB	Indiana	
1	4	Tennessee Titans	Carnell Tate	WR	Ohio State	
1	5	New York Giants	Arvell Reese	LB	Ohio State	
1	7	Washington Commanders	Sonny Styles	LB	Ohio State	
1	11	Dallas Cowboys	Caleb Downs	S	Ohio State	
1	14	Baltimore Ravens	Vega Ioane	G	Penn State	
1	16	New York Jets	Kenyon Sadiq	TE	Oregon	
1	20	Philadelphia Eagles	Makai Lemon	WR	USC	
1	25	Chicago Bears	Dillon Thieneman	S	Oregon	
1	30	New York Jets	Omar Cooper	WR	Indiana	
2	36	Houston Texans	Kayden McDonald	DT	Ohio State	from Las Vegas (Note: No. 36: Las Vegas → Houston (D). Las Vegas traded second- and fourth-round selections (36th and 117th overall) to Houston in exchange for second- and third-round selections (38th and 91st overall).)
2	39	Cleveland Browns	Denzel Boston	WR	Washington	
2	44	Detroit Lions	Derrick Moore	EDGE	Michigan	from Dallas via NY Jets (Note: No. 44: Dallas → NY Jets → Detroit. Multiple trades: Dallas → NY Jets (PD). Dallas traded a second-round selection (44th overall), a 2027 first-round selection and DT Mazi Smith to the NY Jets in exchange for DT Quinnen Williams. NY Jets → Detroit (PD). The NY Jets traded a second-round selection (44th overall) to Detroit in exchange for second- and fourth- round selections (50th and 128th overall).)
2	50	New York Jets	D'Angelo Ponds	CB	Indiana	from Detroit (Note: No. 50: Detroit → NY Jets (D). See Round 2: Detroit → NY Jets.)
2	55	New England Patriots	Gabe Jacas	DE	Illinois	from LA Chargers (Note: No. 55: LA Chargers → New England (D). The LA Chargers traded a second-round selection (55th overall) to New England in exchange for second-, fourth- and sixth- round selections (63rd, 131st and 202nd overall).)
2	57	Chicago Bears	Logan Jones	C	Iowa	2025 Rimington Trophy winner
2	59	Houston Texans	Marlin Klein	TE	Michigan	
2	61	Los Angeles Rams	Max Klare	TE	Ohio State	
2	62	Buffalo Bills	Davison Igbinosun	CB	Ohio State	from Denver (Note: No. 62: Denver → Buffalo (D). Denver traded a second-round selection (62nd overall) to Buffalo in exchange for third- and sixth-round selections (66th and 182nd overall).)
3	72	Cincinnati Bengals	Tacario Davis	CB	Washington	
3	76	Pittsburgh Steelers	Drew Allar	QB	Penn State	from Dallas (Note: No. 76: Dallas → Pittsburgh (PD). Dallas traded a third-round selection (76th overall) and a 2027 fifth-round selection to Pittsburgh in exchange for a 2027 sixth-round selection and WR George Pickens.)
3	80	Baltimore Ravens	Ja'Kobi Lane	WR	USC	
3	87	Miami Dolphins	Will Kacmarek	TE	Ohio State	from Philadelphia (Note: No. 87: Philadelphia → Miami (PD). Philadelphia traded a third-round selection (87th overall) to Miami in exchange for LB Jaelan Phillips.)
3	88	Jacksonville Jaguars	Emmanuel Pregnon	G	Oregon	
3	90	San Francisco 49ers	Kaelon Black	RB	Indiana	from Houston via Miami (Note: No. 90: Houston → Miami → San Francisco. Multiple trades: Houston → Miami (PD). Houston traded a third-round selection (90th overall) and a 2025 sixth-round selection to Miami in exchange for 2025 fourth- and seventh-round selections. Miami → San Francisco (D). See Round 1: San Francisco → Miami.)
3	92	Dallas Cowboys	Jaishawn Barham	EDGE	Michigan	from San Francisco (Note: No. 92: San Francisco → Dallas (PD). San Francisco traded a third-round selection (92nd overall) to Dallas in exchange for DT Osa Odighizuwa.)
3	96	Pittsburgh Steelers	Gennings Dunker	T	Iowa	from Seattle (Note: No. 96: Seattle → Pittsburgh (D). Seattle traded a third-round selection (96th overall) to Pittsburgh in exchange for third- and sixth-round selections (99th and 216th overall).)
3*	97	Minnesota Vikings	Caleb Tiernan	T	Northwestern	
3×	100	Jacksonville Jaguars	Jalen Huskey	CB	Maryland	2020 Resolution JC-2A selection; from Detroit (Note: Detroit received a third-round selection after the NY Jets hired former Detroit defensive coordinator Aaron Glenn as head coach. This selection was traded to Jacksonville. (Note: No. 100: Detroit → Jacksonville (PD). See Round 3: Detroit → Jacksonville.))
4	108	Denver Broncos	Jonah Coleman	RB	Washington	from New Orleans (Note: No. 108: New Orleans → Denver (PD). New Orleans traded a fourth-round selection (108th overall) and a 2027 seventh-round selection to Denver in exchange for WR Devaughn Vele.)
4	109	Kansas City Chiefs	Jadon Canady	CB	Oregon	
4	112	Dallas Cowboys	Drew Shelton	T	Penn State	
4	115	Baltimore Ravens	Elijah Sarratt	WR	Indiana	
4	118	Detroit Lions	Jimmy Rolder	LB	Michigan	
4	120	Green Bay Packers	Dani Dennis-Sutton	DE	Penn State	
4	121	Pittsburgh Steelers	Kaden Wetjen	WR	Iowa	
4	127	San Francisco 49ers	Carver Willis	T	Washington	
4*	135	Indianapolis Colts	Bryce Boettcher	LB	Oregon	
4*	139	San Francisco 49ers	Ephesians Prysock	CB	Washington	
5	141	Houston Texans	Kamari Ramsey	S	USC	from Las Vegas and Cleveland (Note: No. 141: Las Vegas → Cleveland → Houston. Multiple trades: Las Vegas → Cleveland (PD). Las Vegas traded a fifth-round selection (141st overall) to Cleveland in exchange for QB Kenny Pickett. Cleveland → Houston (PD). Cleveland traded a fifth-round selection (141st overall) to Houston in exchange for OT Tytus Howard.)
5	148	Seattle Seahawks	Beau Stephens	G	Iowa	from Kansas City via Cleveland (Note: No. 148: Kansas City → Cleveland (D). See Round 1: Cleveland → Kansas City.)
5	151	Carolina Panthers	Zakee Wheatley	S	Penn State	from Miami
5	159	Minnesota Vikings	Max Bredeson	FB	Michigan	from Carolina (Note: No. 159: Carolina → Minnesota (D). See Round 2: Carolina → Minnesota.)
5	161	Kansas City Chiefs	Emmett Johnson	RB	Nebraska	from Pittsburgh
5	165	Tennessee Titans	Nicholas Singleton	RB	Penn State	from Chicago via Buffalo (Note: No. 165: Chicago → Buffalo → Tennessee. Multiple trades: Chicago → Buffalo (PD). See Round 2: Buffalo → Chicago. Buffalo → Tennessee (D). See Round 1: Buffalo → Tennessee.)
5	169	Pittsburgh Steelers	Riley Nowakowski	TE	Indiana	from LA Rams via Kansas City (Note: No. 169: LA Rams → Kansas City (PD). See Round 1: LA Rams → Kansas City.)
5	172	New Orleans Saints	Lorenzo Styles Jr.	S	Ohio State	from Seattle (Note: No. 172: Seattle → New Orleans (PD). See Round 4: Seattle → New Orleans.)
5*	181	Buffalo Bills	Zane Durant	DT	Penn State	from Detroit
6	183	Arizona Cardinals	Karson Sharar	LB	Iowa	
6	187	Washington Commanders	Kaytron Allen	RB	Penn State	
6	192	New York Giants	J. C. Davis	T	Illinois	from Miami (Note: No. 192: Miami → NY Giants (PD). Miami traded a sixth-round selection (192nd overall) to the NY Giants in exchange for a conditional 2027 seventh-round selection and TE Darren Waller.)
6	194	Tennessee Titans	Pat Coogan	C	Indiana	from Baltimore via NY Jets (Note: No. 194: Baltimore → NY Jets → Tennessee. Multiple trades: Baltimore → NY Jets (PD). See Round 5: NY Jets → Baltimore. NY Jets → Tennessee (PD). The NY Jets traded a sixth-round selection (194th overall) to Tennessee in exchange for a seventh-round selection (238th overall) and CB Jarvis Brownlee Jr.)
6	195	Las Vegas Raiders	Malik Benson	WR	Oregon	from Tampa Bay
6	206	Los Angeles Chargers	Alex Harkey	G	Oregon	from Chicago via Cleveland (Note: No. 206: Chicago → Cleveland→ LA Chargers. Multiple trades: Chicago → Cleveland (PD). Chicago traded a sixth-round selection (206th overall) to Cleveland in exchange for a seventh-round selection (239th overall) and DE Joe Tryon-Shoyinka. Cleveland → LA Chargers (D). See Round 3: Cleveland → LA Rams.)
6	208	Atlanta Falcons	Anterio Thompson	DT	Washington	from Buffalo and NY Jets (Note: No. 208: Buffalo → NY Jets → Las Vegas. Multiple trades: Buffalo → NY Jets (PD). Buffalo traded a sixth-round selection (208th overall) to the NY Jets in exchange for a seventh-round selection (220th overall) and CB Brandon Codrington. NY Jets → Las Vegas (PD). The NY Jets traded a sixth-round selection (208th overall) to the Las Vegas in exchange for a seventh-round selection (228th overall) and QB Geno Smith.)
6	209	Washington Commanders	Matt Gulbin	C	Michigan State	from San Francisco (Note: No. 209: San Francisco → Washington (PD). San Francisco traded a sixth-round selection (209th overall) to Washington in exchange for RB Brian Robinson Jr.)
6	211	Baltimore Ravens	Ryan Eckley	P	Michigan State	from Denver via NY Jets, Minnesota and Philadelphia (Note: No. 211: Denver → NY Jets → Minnesota → Philadelphia → Baltimore. Multiple trades: Denver → NY Jets (PD). Denver traded a sixth-round selection (211th overall) to the NY Jets in exchange for DL John Franklin-Myers. NY Jets → Minnesota (PD). The NY Jets traded a sixth-round selection (211th overall) and a 2027 sixth-round selection to Minnesota in exchange for a 2027 seventh-round selection and DT Harrison Phillips. Minnesota → Philadelphia (PD). See Round 5: Philadelphia → Minnesota. Philadelphia → Baltimore (PD). Philadelphia traded a sixth-round selection (211th overall) to Baltimore in exchange for a 2027 seventh-round selection and CB Jaire Alexander.)
6*	214	Indianapolis Colts	Caden Curry	DE	Ohio State	from Pittsburgh (Note: No. 214: Pittsburgh → Indianapolis (PD). Pittsburgh traded a sixth-round selection (214th overall) to Indianapolis in exchange for a seventh-round selection (230th overall) and WR Michael Pittman Jr.)
7	219	New Orleans Saints	TJ Hall	CB	Iowa	from Las Vegas
7	223	Washington Commanders	Athan Kaliakmanis	QB	Rutgers	
7	231	Atlanta Falcons	Ethan Onianwa	T	Ohio State	
7	233	Jacksonville Jaguars	Zach Durfee	DE	Washington	from Detroit (Note: No. 233: Detroit → Jacksonville (PD). Detroit traded a conditional seventh-round selection (233rd overall) to Jacksonville in exchange for K Riley Patterson.)
7	238	Miami Dolphins	Max Llewellyn	DE	Iowa	from LA Chargers via Tennessee and NY Jets (Note: No. 238: LA Chargers → Tennessee → NY Jets. Multiple trades: LA Chargers → Tennessee (PD). The LA Chargers traded a seventh-round selection (238th overall) to Tennessee in exchange for S Elijah Molden. Tennessee → NY Jets (PD). See Round 6: NY Jets → Tennessee. NY Jets → Miami (PD). The NY Jets traded a seventh-round selection (238th overall) to Miami in exchange for S Minkah Fitzpatrick.)
7	242	Seattle Seahawks	Deven Eastern	DT	Minnesota	from Buffalo via Cleveland and NY Jets (Note: No. 242: Buffalo → Cleveland → NY Jets. Multiple trades: Buffalo → Cleveland (PD). Buffalo traded a seventh-round selection (242nd overall) and a 2025 third-round selection to Cleveland in exchange for a 2025 sixth-round selection and WR Amari Cooper. Cleveland → NY Jets (PD). See Round 6: NY Jets → Cleveland.)
7	243	Houston Texans	Aiden Fisher	LB	Indiana	from San Francisco (Note: No. 243: San Francisco → Houston (PD). San Francisco traded a seventh-round selection (243rd overall) to Houston in exchange for DT Khalil Davis.)
7	246	Denver Broncos	Miles Scott	S	Illinois	
7*	250	Baltimore Ravens	Rayshaun Benny	DT	Michigan	
7*	253	Baltimore Ravens	Evan Beerntsen	G	Northwestern	

Trades In the explanations below, (PD) indicates trades completed prior to the start of the draft (i.e. Pre-Draft), while (D) denotes trades that took place during the 2022 draft.

== Head coaches ==
Team	Head coach	Years at school	Overall record	Record at school	B1G record
Illinois	Bret Bielema (Note: Bret Bielema coached in the Big Ten from 2006 through 2012 at Wisconsin, going 37–19 in Big Ten play and winning three Big Ten championships.)	5	134–84 (.615)	37–26 (.587)	60–41 (.594)
Indiana	Curt Cignetti	2	146–37 (.798)	27–2 (.931)	17–1 (.944)
Iowa	Kirk Ferentz	27	225–149 (.602)	213–128 (.625)	134–91 (.596)
Maryland	Mike Locksley (Note: Mike Locksley served as interim head coach at Maryland in 2015 and coached for six games, going 1–5.)	7	39–75 (.342)	37–49 (.430)	17–48 (.262)
Michigan	Sherrone Moore	2	16–8 (.667)	16–8 (.667)	11–6 (.647)
Michigan	Biff Poggi	1 (interim)	8–17 (.320)	2–1 (.667)	1–0 (1.000)
Michigan State	Jonathan Smith (Note: Michigan State was forced to vacate a total of 14 wins from the three prior seasons, including all five wins during Smith's first year as MSU head coach due to NCAA violations that occurred under Mel Tucker's watch.)	2	38–49 (.437)	4–15 (.211)	1–14 (.067)
Minnesota	P. J. Fleck	9	96–66 (.593)	66–44 (.600)	39–40 (.494)
Nebraska	Matt Rhule	3	66–62 (.516)	19–19 (.500)	10–17 (.370)
Northwestern	David Braun (Note: Pat Fitzgerald was relieved as head coach on July 10, 2023, after allegations of hazing within the Wildcat football program surfaced.) (Note: David Braun was named interim head coach on July 14, 2023.)	3	19–19 (.500)	19–19 (.500)	11–16 (.407)
Ohio State	Ryan Day (Note: Ryan Day served as interim head coach at Ohio State for the first three games of the 2018 season while Urban Meyer served a three-game suspension and went 3–0.)	7	82–12 (.872)	82–12 (.872)	55–5 (.917)
Oregon	Dan Lanning	4	48–8 (.857)	48–8 (.857)	17–1 (.944)
Penn State	James Franklin	12	128–60 (.681)	104–45 (.698)	64–36 (.640)
Penn State	Terry Smith (interim)	1	4–3 (.571)	4–3 (.571)	3–3 (.500)
Purdue	Barry Odom	1	46–43 (.517)	2–10 (.167)	0–9 (.000)
Rutgers	Greg Schiano (Note: Greg Schiano served as head coach at Rutgers from 2001 through 2011 then left for the NFL. Following the conclusion of the 2019 season, Schiano returned to Rutgers for his second stint as head coach. The Scarlet Knights competed in the Big East Conference in his previous stay at the school.)	17	99–108 (.478)	99–108 (.478)	15–39 (.278)
UCLA	DeShaun Foster	2	5–10 (.333)	5–10 (.333)	3–6 (.333)
UCLA	Tim Skipper (interim)	1	10–13 (.435)	3–6 (.333)	3–6 (.333)
USC	Lincoln Riley	4	90–28 (.763)	35–18 (.660)	11–7 (.611)
Washington	Jedd Fisch	2	32–33 (.492)	15–11 (.577)	9–9 (.500)
Wisconsin	Luke Fickell (Note: Luke Fickell served as interim head coach at Ohio State in 2011, going 6–7 overall and 3–5 in the Big Ten. Fickell took over as coach of Wisconsin for the 2022 Guaranteed Rate Bowl)	3	80–46 (.635)	17–21 (.447)	13–22 (.371)
