= 2025 All-Big Ten Conference football team =

College football honor

The 2025 All-Big Ten Conference football team consists of American football players chosen as All-Big Ten Conference players for the 2025 Big Ten Conference football season. The conference recognizes two official All-Big Ten selectors: (1) the Big Ten conference coaches selected separate offensive and defensive units and named first-, second- and third-team players (the "Coaches" team); and (2) a panel of sports writers and broadcasters covering the Big Ten also selected offensive and defensive units and named first-, second- and third-team players (the "Media" team).

== Key ==
Bold = Consensus first-team selection by both the coaches and media

Coaches = Selected by the Big Ten Conference coaches

Media = Selected by the conference media

== Offensive selections ==
=== Quarterbacks ===
- **Fernando Mendoza**, Indiana (Coaches-1; Media-1)
- Julian Sayin, Ohio State (Coaches-2; Media-2)
- Jayden Maiava, USC (Coaches-3)
- Dante Moore, Oregon (Media-3)

=== Running backs ===
- **Emmett Johnson**, Nebraska (Coaches-1; Media-1)
- **Kaytron Allen**, Penn State (Coaches-1; Media-1)
- Antwan Raymond, Rutgers (Coaches-2; Media-2)
- Bo Jackson, Ohio State (Coaches-2; Media-3)
- Jordan Marshall, Michigan (Coaches-3; Media-2)
- Justice Haynes, Michigan (Coaches-3)
- Roman Hemby, Indiana (Media-3)

=== Wide receivers ===
- **Makai Lemon**, USC (Coaches-1; Media-1)
- **Jeremiah Smith**, Ohio State (Coaches-1; Media-1)
- **Carnell Tate**, Ohio State (Coaches-1; Media-1)
- Omar Cooper Jr., Indiana (Coaches-2; Media-2)
- KJ Duff, Rutgers (Coaches-2; Media-2)
- Elijah Sarratt, Indiana (Coaches-2; Media-2)
- Hank Beatty, Illinois (Coaches-3; Media-3)
- Denzel Boston, Washington (Coaches-3; Media-3)
- Ja'Kobi Lane, USC (Media-3)
- Griffin Wilde, Northwestern (Coaches-3)

=== Centers ===
- **Logan Jones**, Iowa (Coaches-1; Media-1)
- Pat Coogan, Indiana (Coaches-3; Media-2)
- Iapani Laloulu, Oregon (Coaches-2)
- Carson Hinzman, Ohio State (Media-3)

=== Guards ===
- **Emmanuel Pregnon**, Oregon (Coaches-1; Media-1)
- Olaivavega Ioane, Penn State (Coaches-2; Media-1)
- Beau Stephens, Iowa (Coaches-1; Media-2)
- Luke Montgomery, Ohio State (Coaches-2; Media-2)
- Giovanni El-Hadi, Michigan (Coaches-3)
- Dave Iuli, Oregon (Coaches-3)
- Kade Pieper, Iowa (Media-3)
- Tegra Tshabola, Ohio State (Media-3)

=== Tackles ===
- **Carter Smith**, Indiana (Coaches-1; Media-1)
- J. C. Davis, Illinois (Coaches-1; Media-2)
- Gennings Dunker, Iowa (Coaches-3; Media-1)
- Austin Siereveld, Ohio State (Coaches-2; Media-3)
- Caleb Tiernan, Northwestern (Coaches-2)
- Isaiah World, Oregon (Media-2)
- Phillip Daniels, Ohio State (Media-3)
- Trevor Lauck, Iowa (Coaches-3)

=== Tight ends ===
- **Max Klare**, Ohio State (Coaches-1; Media-1)
- **Kenyon Sadiq**, Oregon (Coaches-1; Media-1)
- Lake McRee, USC (Coaches-2; Media-2)
- Lance Mason, Wisconsin (Coaches-2; Media-3)
- Riley Nowakowski, Indiana (Coaches-3; Media-2)
- Max Bredeson, Michigan (Coaches-3)
- Jack Velling, Michigan State (Media-3)

== Defensive selections ==
=== Defensive linemen ===
- **Kayden McDonald**, Ohio State (Coaches-1; Media-1)
- **Tyrique Tucker**, Indiana (Coaches-1; Media-1)
- Caden Curry, Ohio State (Coaches-2; Media-1)
- Gabe Jacas, Illinois (Coaches-2; Media-1)
- Derrick Moore, Michigan (Coaches-1; Media-2)
- Anthony Smith, Minnesota (Coaches-1; Media-2)
- Bear Alexander, Oregon, (Coaches-2; Media-2)
- Aaron Graves, Iowa (Coaches-2; Media-2)
- Rayshaun Benny, Michigan (Coaches-3; Media-3)
- Dani Dennis-Sutton, Penn State (Coaches-3; Media-3)
- Teitum Tuioti, Oregon (Coaches-3; Media-3)
- A'Mauri Washington, Oregon (Coaches-3; Media-3)

=== Linebackers ===
- **Aiden Fisher**, Indiana (Coaches-1; Media-1)
- **Arvell Reese**, Ohio State (Coaches-1; Media-1)
- **Sonny Styles**, Ohio State (Coaches-1; Media-1)
- Bryce Boettcher, Oregon (Coaches-2; Media-2)
- Rolijah Hardy, Indiana (Coaches-2; Media-2)
- Jimmy Rolder, Michigan (Coaches-2; Media-2)
- Mac Uihlein, Northwestern (Coaches-3; Media-3)
- Amare Campbell, Penn State (Media-3)
- Ernest Hausmann, Michigan (Media-3)
- Isaiah Jones, Indiana (Media-3)
- Mason Posa, Wisconsin (Coaches-3)
- Mani Powell, Purdue (Coaches-3)

=== Defensive backs ===
- **Caleb Downs**, Ohio State (Coaches-1; Media-1)
- **Bishop Fitzgerald**, USC (Coaches-1; Media-1)
- **D'Angelo Ponds**, Indiana (Coaches-1; Media-1)
- **Dillon Thieneman**, Oregon (Coaches-1; Media-1)
- Davison Igbinosun, Ohio State (Coaches-2; Media-1)
- Louis Moore, Indiana (Coaches-1; Media-2)
- Jalen Huskey, Maryland (Coaches-2; Media-2)
- Zeke Berry, Michigan (Coaches-3; Media-2)
- Brandon Finney Jr., Oregon (Coaches-2; Media-3)
- Robert Fitzgerald, Northwestern (Coaches-2; Media-3)
- Zach Lutmer, Iowa (Coaches-2; Media-3)
- Koi Perich, Minnesota (Coaches-3; Media-2)
- Amare Ferrell, Indiana (Media-2)
- TJ Hall, Iowa (Coaches-3; Media-3)
- Jermaine Mathews, Ohio State (Coaches-3)
- Jaylen McClain, Ohio State (Media-3)
- Xavier Nwankpa, Iowa (Coaches-3)

== Special teams ==
=== Kickers ===
- Sean O'Haire, Maryland (Coaches-1; Media-2)
- Nico Radicic, Indiana (Coaches-2; Media-1)
- Ryon Sayeri, USC (Coaches-3)
- Drew Stevens, Iowa (Media-3)

=== Punters ===
- **Ryan Eckley**, Michigan State (Coaches-1; Media-1)
- Bryce McFerson, Maryland (Coaches-2; Media-2)
- Jack McCallister, Purdue (Coaches-2; Media-3)
- Gabriel Nwosu, Penn State (Coaches-3)
- Tom Weston, Minnesota (Media-3)

=== Return specialist ===
- **Kaden Wetjen**, Iowa (Coaches-1; Media-1)
- Jonathan Brady, Indiana (Coaches-2; Media-3)
- Kenneth Williams, Nebraska (Coaches-3; Media-2)
- Jacory Barney Jr., Nebraska (Media-3)

=== Long snapper ===
- **Mark Langston**, Indiana (Coaches-1; Media-1)
- John Ferlmann, Ohio State (Coaches-3; Media-2)
- Luke Basso, Oregon (Coaches-2)
- Greg Tarr, Michigan (Coaches-3)
