= Dani Dennis-Sutton =

American football player (born 2003)

No. 51 – Green Bay Packers
- Position: Outside linebacker
- Roster status: Active

Personal information
- Born: December 23, 2003 (age 22); Millsboro, Delaware, U.S.
- Listed height: 6 ft 5 in (1.96 m)
- Listed weight: 256 lb (116 kg)

Career information
- High school: McDonogh School (Owings Mills, Maryland)
- College: Penn State (2022–2025)
- NFL draft: 2026: 4th round, 120th overall pick

Career history
- Green Bay Packers (2026–present)

Awards and highlights
- 2× Third-team All-Big Ten (2023, 2025)

Career NFL statistics as of Week 10, 2026
- Total tackles: 26
- Sacks: 3
- Fumble recoveries: 1
- Pass deflections: 2
- Stats at Pro Football Reference

Dani Deshon Dennis-Sutton (born December 23, 2003) is an American professional football outside linebacker for the Green Bay Packers of the National Football League (NFL). He played college football for the Penn State Nittany Lions and was selected by the Packers in the fourth round of the 2026 NFL draft.

== Early life ==
Dennis-Sutton attended McDonogh School in Owings Mills, Maryland. He played football, basketball and ran track in high school. A five-star recruit, he was selected to play in the 2022 All-American Bowl. Dennis-Sutton committed to Penn State University to play college football.

== College career ==
Dennis-Sutton earned immediate playing time his true freshman year at Penn State in 2022. He recorded his first career sack in his second career game against Auburn. He finished the season with 17 tackles and three sacks and was recognized as an ESPN True Freshman All-American. In 2023, he totaled 26 tackles, six tackles for loss, 3.5 sacks and two forced fumbles, earning third-team All-Big Ten honors from the coaches and honorable mention from the media.

In 2024, Dennis-Sutton became a starter opposite Abdul Carter, recording 42 tackles, a career-high 13 tackles for loss and 8.5 sacks, which tied for sixth in the Big Ten. He was named All-Big Ten honorable mention by the media. In the Orange Bowl College Football Playoff semifinal against Notre Dame, he had two sacks and an interception. He announced he would return to Penn State for the 2025 season rather than enter the 2025 NFL draft.

As a senior in 2025, Dennis-Sutton started all 13 games and recorded 42 tackles, 12 tackles for loss, 8.5 sacks, three forced fumbles and three blocked punts. The three blocked punts led the nation and tied a Penn State single-season record. He was named Big Ten Defensive Player of the Week in November and earned third-team All-Big Ten honors from both the coaches and the media. He finished his Penn State career ranked sixth in school history with 23.5 sacks and was a three-time Academic All-Big Ten selection (2023–2025).

== Professional career ==
Pre-draft measurables
Height	Weight	Arm length	Hand span	Wingspan	40-yard dash	10-yard split	20-yard split	Three-cone drill	Vertical jump	Broad jump	Bench press
6 ft 5 5/8 in (1.97 m)	256 lb (116 kg)	33 1/2 in (0.85 m)	10 1/8 in (0.26 m)	6 ft 10 1/4 in (2.09 m)	4.63 s	1.63 s	2.67 s	6.90 s	39.5 in (1.00 m)	10 ft 11 in (3.33 m)	26 reps
All values from NFL Combine/Pro Day

Dennis-Sutton was selected by the Green Bay Packers in the fourth round with the 120th overall pick of the 2026 NFL draft. He was signed on May 1, 2026.
