= Teitum Tuioti =

American football linebacker

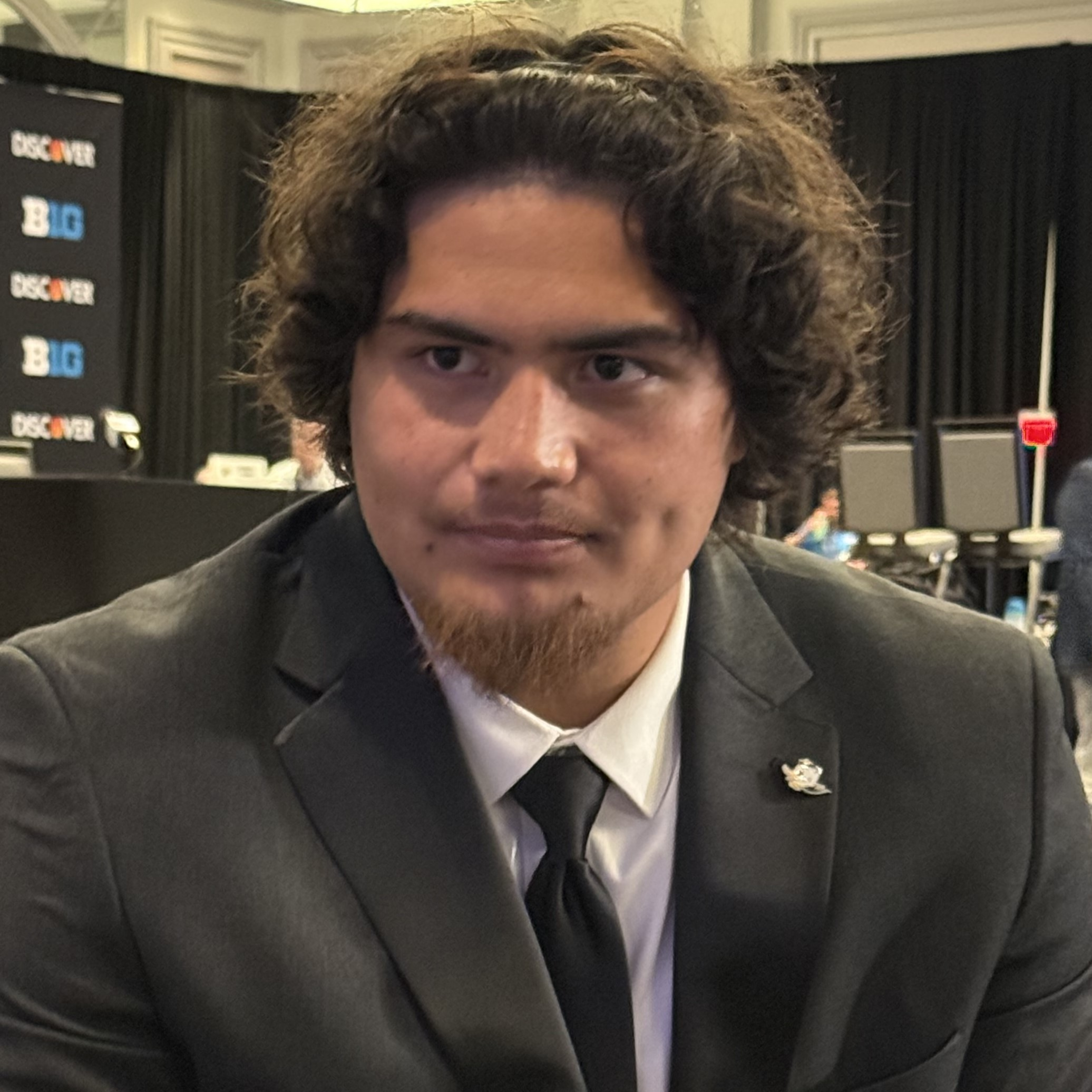
- Tuioti at 2026 Big Ten Media Day

No. 44 – Oregon Ducks
- Position: Linebacker
- Class: Senior

Personal information
- Born: Laie, Hawaii, U.S.
- Listed height: 6 ft 3 in (1.91 m)
- Listed weight: 263 lb (119 kg)

Career information
- High school: Sheldon (Eugene, Oregon)
- College: Oregon (2023–present)

Awards and highlights
- Third-team All-Big Ten (2025)
- Stats at ESPN

Teitum Tuioti is an American college football linebacker for the Oregon Ducks.

== Early life ==
Tuioti attended Lincoln Southeast High School in Lincoln, Nebraska for three years before transferring to Sheldon High School in Eugene, Oregon, ahead of his senior season. He was rated as a three star recruit and committed to play college football for the Oregon Ducks over offers from schools such as Nebraska, Kansas State, Texas Tech, Oregon State, California, Washington and Boise State.

== College career ==
In week 4 of the 2023 season, Tuioti recorded his first career sack in a win over Colorado. He finished his first collegiate season in 2023 with 30 tackles with four being for a loss, and two sacks. In the Ducks' 2024 spring game, Tuioti notched five tackles and two and a half sacks. That season, he appeared in 14 games, where he totaled 58 tackles with eight being for a loss, five and a half sacks, a pass deflection, and a forced fumble for Oregon.

== Personal life ==
Tuioti is son of Oregon defensive line coach Tony Tuioti who he currently plays for. Tuioti's brother Mana is a linebacker for the Boise State Broncos.
