= Bryce Boettcher =

American football and baseball player (born 2002)

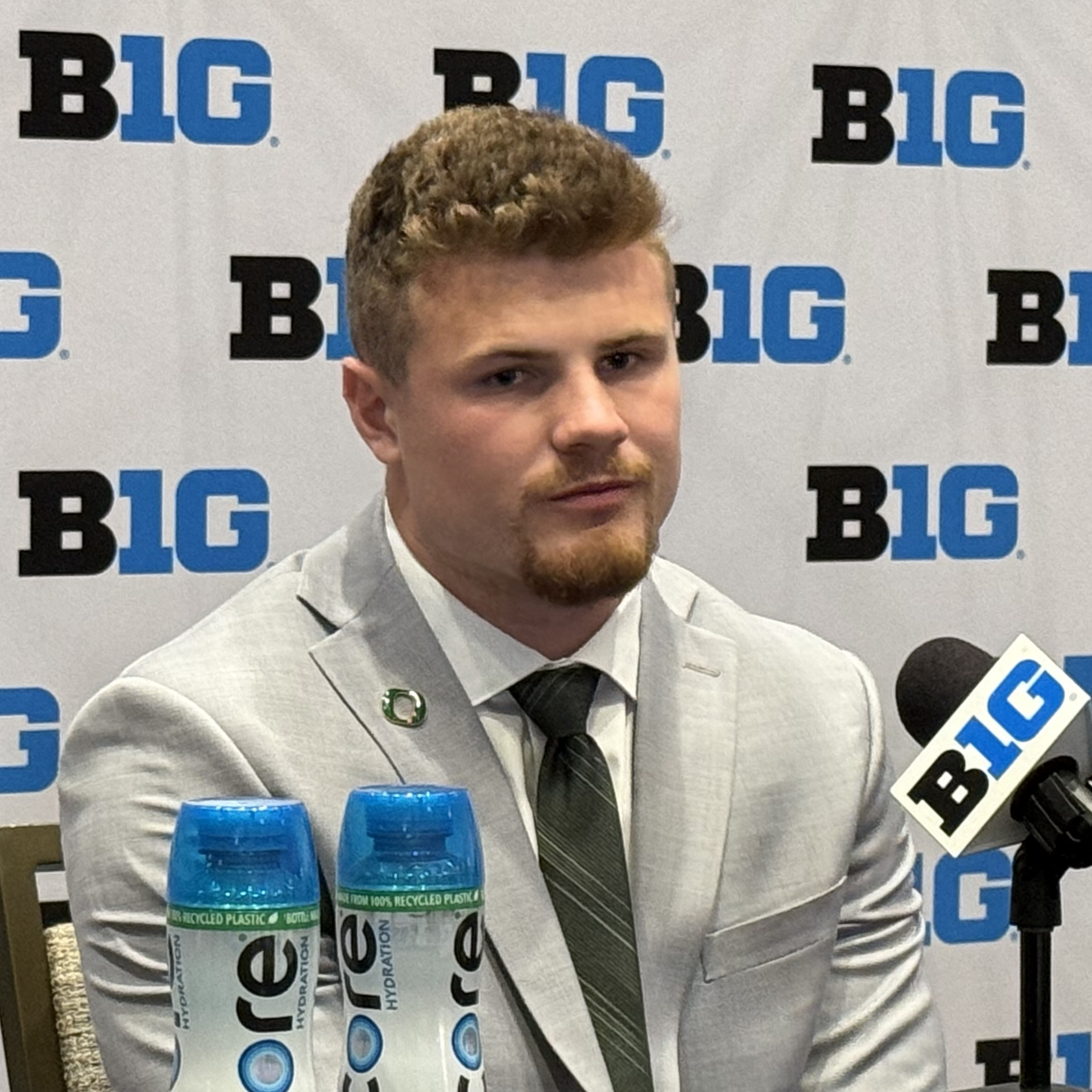
- Boettcher at 2025 Big Ten Media Days

No. 50 – Indianapolis Colts
- Position: Linebacker
- Roster status: Active

Personal information
- Born: July 8, 2002 (age 24); Eugene, Oregon, U.S.
- Listed height: 6 ft 1 in (1.85 m)
- Listed weight: 230 lb (104 kg)

Career information
- High school: South Eugene
- College: Oregon (2021–2025)
- NFL draft: 2026: 4th round, 135th overall pick

Career history
- Indianapolis Colts (2026–present)

Awards and highlights
- First-team All-American (2025); Burlsworth Trophy (2024); 2× Second-team All-Big Ten (2024, 2025)

Career NFL statistics as of Week 5, 2026
- Tackles: 21
- Stats at Pro Football Reference
- Baseball career

Houston Astros
- Outfielder
- Bats: Right Throws: Right
- Stats at Baseball Reference

Bryce Alan Boettcher (BECH-ər; born July 8, 2002) is an American professional football linebacker for the Indianapolis Colts of the National Football League (NFL). He played college football for the Oregon Ducks and was selected by the Colts in the fourth round of the 2026 NFL draft. Boettcher is also a professional baseball outfielder in the Houston Astros organization.

== Early life ==
Boettcher attended South Eugene High School in Eugene, Oregon, and was rated as a three-star recruit. He committed to play college baseball as a walk-on for the Oregon Ducks.

== College football career ==
In Boettcher's first two seasons in 2022 and 2023, he totaled 39 tackles with three being for a loss, a sack, a forced fumble, and a fumble recovery in 26 games. After being selected in the 2024 MLB draft, he decided to return to play for the Ducks in 2024. In week three of the 2024 season, Boettcher recorded ten tackles as he helped the Ducks to a win over rival Oregon State. Boettcher was the Ducks' leader in tackles for the 2024 season, and won the Burlsworth Trophy, which is awarded to the top walk-on player in college football. In April 2025, Boettcher announced he would be returning to the Ducks for the 2025 season.

== Baseball career ==
Boettcher had a breakout season in 2024 where he batted .276 with 12 home runs, 35 RBI, and 15 stolen bases, earning a collegiate Gold Glove. After the season, he was drafted by the Houston Astros in the 13th round of the 2024 MLB draft.

== Professional football career ==
Pre-draft measurables
Height	Weight	Arm length	Hand span	Wingspan	40-yard dash	10-yard split	20-yard split	20-yard shuttle	Three-cone drill	Vertical jump	Broad jump	Bench press
6 ft 1 1/4 in (1.86 m)	233 lb (106 kg)	30 3/4 in (0.78 m)	9 in (0.23 m)	6 ft 3 1/8 in (1.91 m)	4.69 s	1.63 s	2.73 s	4.30 s	7.25 s	34.5 in (0.88 m)	9 ft 8 in (2.95 m)	21 reps
All values from NFL Combine/Pro Day

Boettcher was selected by the Indianapolis Colts in the fourth round with the 135th overall pick in the 2026 NFL draft.
