= Zakee Wheatley =

American football player (born 2002)

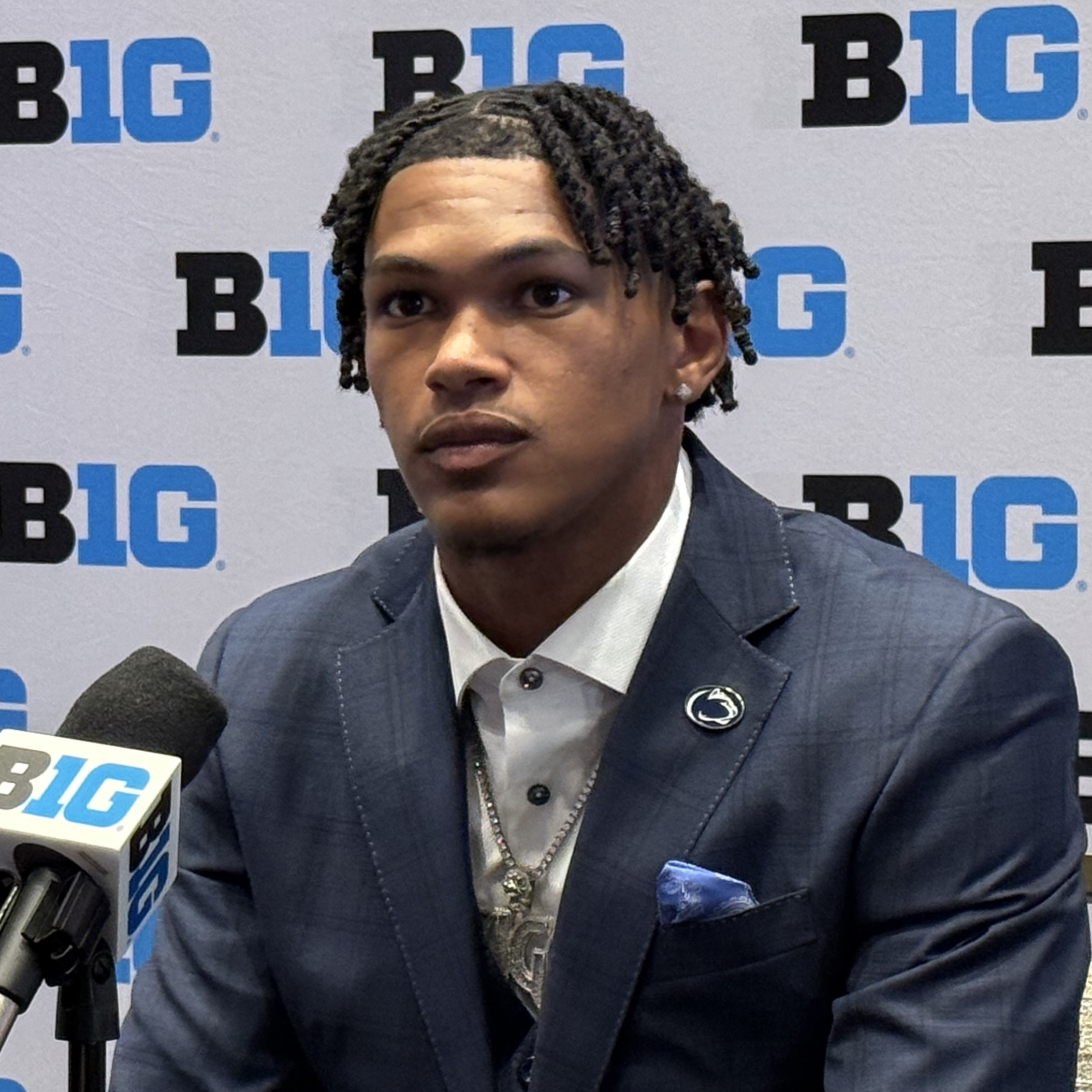
- Wheatley in 2025

No. 20 – Carolina Panthers
- Position: Safety
- Roster status: Active

Personal information
- Born: February 28, 2002 (age 24); Crofton, Maryland, U.S.
- Listed height: 6 ft 3 in (1.91 m)
- Listed weight: 204 lb (93 kg)

Career information
- High school: Archbishop Spalding (Severn, Maryland)
- College: Penn State (2021–2025)
- NFL draft: 2026: 5th round, 151st overall pick

Career history
- Carolina Panthers (2026–present)

Career NFL statistics as of Week 8, 2026
- Tackles: 26
- Forced fumbles: 1
- Pass deflections: 4
- Interceptions: 1
- Stats at Pro Football Reference

Zakee Kai Wheatley (born February 28, 2002) is an American professional football safety for the Carolina Panthers of the National Football League (NFL). He played college football for the Penn State Nittany Lions and was selected by the Panthers in the fifth round of the 2026 NFL draft.

== Early life ==
Wheatley attended Archbishop Spalding High School in Severn, Maryland. Playing both wide receiver and safety, he recorded five interceptions, seven pass breakups and 30 tackles on defense, while hauling in 56 receptions for 810 yards and seven touchdowns as a junior. A four-star recruit, Wheatley committed to play college football at Pennsylvania State University, over offers from Boston College, Michigan State, and Virginia.

== College career ==
In 2021, Wheatley played sparingly in four games, earning a redshirt. Against Auburn the following season, he recorded his first career interception. In 2022, his production increased, as he totaled 27 tackles, two interceptions, and a forced fumble. In 2024, Wheatley's role increased after an injury to Kevin Winston Jr.. At the conclusion of the regular season, he announced that he would return the following season, rather than enter the 2025 NFL draft, after totaling 77 total tackles, four pass breakups, 1.5 tackles for loss and one interception through 14 games. In the 2024 Fiesta Bowl, Wheatley was named the game's defensive MVP after recording an interception and a fumble recovery, helping lead Penn State to a 31–14 victory.

== Professional career ==
Pre-draft measurables
Height	Weight	Arm length	Hand span	Wingspan	40-yard dash	10-yard split	20-yard split	20-yard shuttle	Three-cone drill	Vertical jump	Broad jump
6 ft 3 1/8 in (1.91 m)	203 lb (92 kg)	31 in (0.79 m)	9 1/2 in (0.24 m)	6 ft 4 3/8 in (1.94 m)	4.65 s	1.64 s	2.56 s	4.11 s	6.98 s	33.0 in (0.84 m)	10 ft 4 in (3.15 m)
All values from NFL Combine/Pro Day

Wheatley was selected by the Carolina Panthers in the fifth round with the 151st overall pick of the 2026 NFL draft.
