= Tegra Tshabola =

American football player (born 2004)

No. 77 – Kentucky Wildcats
- Position: Guard
- Class: Redshirt Senior

Personal information
- Born: January 24, 2004 (age 22); Kinshasa, Democratic Republic of Congo
- Listed height: 6 ft 6 in (1.98 m)
- Listed weight: 329 lb (149 kg)

Career information
- High school: Lakota West (West Chester, Ohio)
- College: Ohio State (2022–2025); Kentucky (2026–present)

Awards and highlights
- CFP national champion (2024); Third-team All-Big Ten (2025)
- Stats at ESPN

Tegra Tshabola (born January 24, 2004) is an Congolese-American college football guard for the Kentucky Wildcats. He previously played for the Ohio State Buckeyes.

== Early life ==
Tshabola was born in the Democratic Republic of the Congo and moved to Ohio as a child. Tshabola attended Lakota West High School in West Chester, Ohio. He was rated as a four-star recruit, the 10th offensive tackle, and the 114th overall player in the class of 2022. Tshabola committed to play college football for the Ohio State Buckeyes over offers from schools such as Kentucky, Louisville, LSU, Michigan, Oregon, and Oklahoma.

== College career ==
As a freshman in 2022, Tshabola appeared in four games for the Buckeyes. In 2023, he played in 13 games in a reserve role. Heading into the 2024 season, Tshabola competed for a starting spot on the Buckeye's offensive line. Off the field, Tshabola has engaged in Name, Image, and Likeness (NIL) deals, including partnerships with Ohio State-focused collectives such as The Foundation and The 1870 Society.

Tshabola transferred to Kentucky after the 2025 season.
