= Anthony Smith (defensive end, born 2004) =

American football player (born 2004)

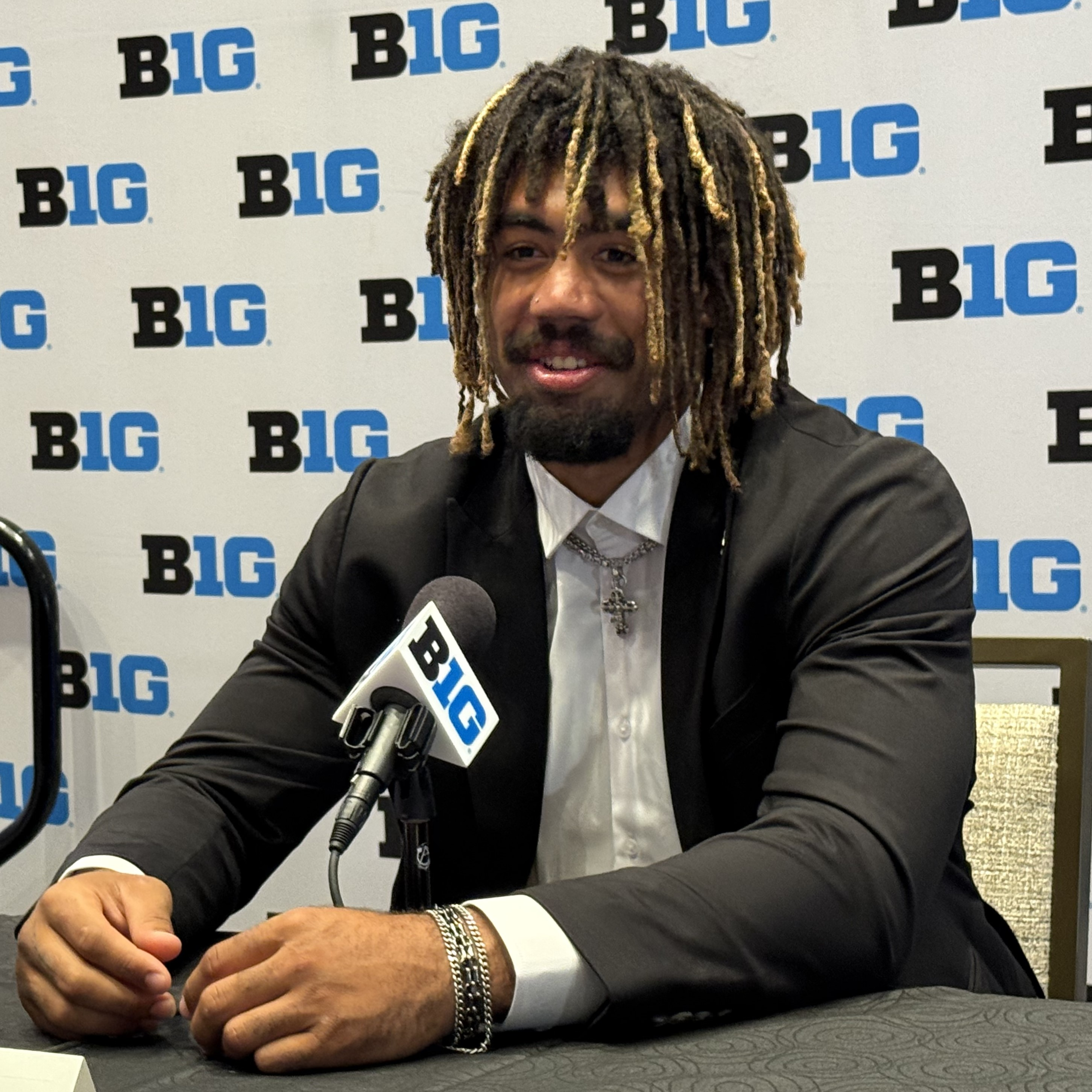
- Smith at 2025 Big Ten Media Days

No. 0 – Minnesota Golden Gophers
- Position: Defensive end
- Class: Redshirt Senior

Personal information
- Born: May 28, 2004 (age 22)
- Listed height: 6 ft 6 in (1.98 m)
- Listed weight: 285 lb (129 kg)

Career information
- High school: Shippensburg (Shippensburg, Pennsylvania)
- College: Minnesota (2022–present)

Awards and highlights
- First-team All-Big Ten (2025)
- Stats at ESPN

Anthony Smith (born May 28, 2004) is an American college football defensive end for the Minnesota Golden Gophers.

== Early life ==
Smith attended Shippensburg Area Senior High School in Shippensburg, Pennsylvania. As a senior, he had 64 tackles with 9.5 sacks and was named PennLive's Boys Athlete of the Year. He committed to play college football at the University of Minnesota.

== College career ==
Smith played in two games with one tackle and redshirted his first year at Minnesota in 2022. In 2023, he played in all 13 games and had 15 tackles and one sack. As a sophomore in 2024, he started three of 13 games, recording 27 tackles and tied for the team lead with six sacks. Smith returned to Minnesota for his redshirt junior season in 2025.
