= Amare Campbell =

American football player (born 2005)

No. 0 – Tennessee Volunteers
- Position: Linebacker
- Class: Senior

Personal information
- Born: August 29, 2005 (age 21)
- Listed height: 6 ft 0 in (1.83 m)
- Listed weight: 230 lb (104 kg)

Career information
- High school: Unity Reed (Manassas, Virginia)
- College: North Carolina (2023–2024); Penn State (2025); Tennessee (2026–present)

Awards and highlights
- Third-team All-Big Ten (2025)
- Stats at ESPN

Amare Campbell (born August 29, 2005) is an American college football linebacker for the Tennessee Volunteers. He previously played for the North Carolina Tar Heels and the Penn State Nittany Lions.

== Early life ==
Campbell attended Unity Reed High School in Manassas, Virginia. As a senior he had 130 tackles and 12.5 sacks. He committed to the University of North Carolina to play college football.

== College career ==
As a true freshman at North Carolina in 2023, Campbell played in 11 games with one start and had 14 tackles, one sack and one interception. As a sophomore in 2024 he started all 13 games and recorded 76 tackles and 6.5 sacks. After the season, he entered the transfer portal and transferred to Penn State.
