= Phillip Daniels (offensive lineman) =

American football player (born 2005)

No. 70 – Ohio State Buckeyes
- Position: Offensive tackle
- Class: Redshirt Junior

Personal information
- Born: February 8, 2005 (age 21)
- Listed height: 6 ft 5 in (1.96 m)
- Listed weight: 315 lb (143 kg)

Career information
- High school: Princeton (Cincinnati, Ohio)
- College: Minnesota (2023–2024); Ohio State (2025–present)

Awards and highlights
- Third-team All-Big Ten (2025)
- Stats at ESPN

Phillip Daniels (born February 8, 2005) is an American college football offensive lineman for the Ohio State Buckeyes. He previously played for the Minnesota Golden Gophers.

== Early life ==
Daniels attended Princeton High School in Cincinnati, Ohio. He was rated as a three-star recruit, the 64th overall interior offensive lineman, and the 770th overall player in the class of 2023, where he held 22 offers. Initially, he committed to play college football for the Pittsburgh Panthers over other schools such as Boston College, Minnesota, and Purdue. However, five months later, Daniels flipped his commitment to play for the Minnesota Golden Gophers.

== College career ==
=== Minnesota ===
As a freshman in 2023, Daniels took a redshirt. In week 11 of the 2024 season, he made his first collegiate start in a win over Illinois. During the 2024 season, Daniels played in all 12 games, starting the final four. After the season, he entered his name into the NCAA transfer portal.

=== Ohio State ===
Daniels transferred to play for the Ohio State Buckeyes.
