= Zach Lutmer =

American football player (born 2004)

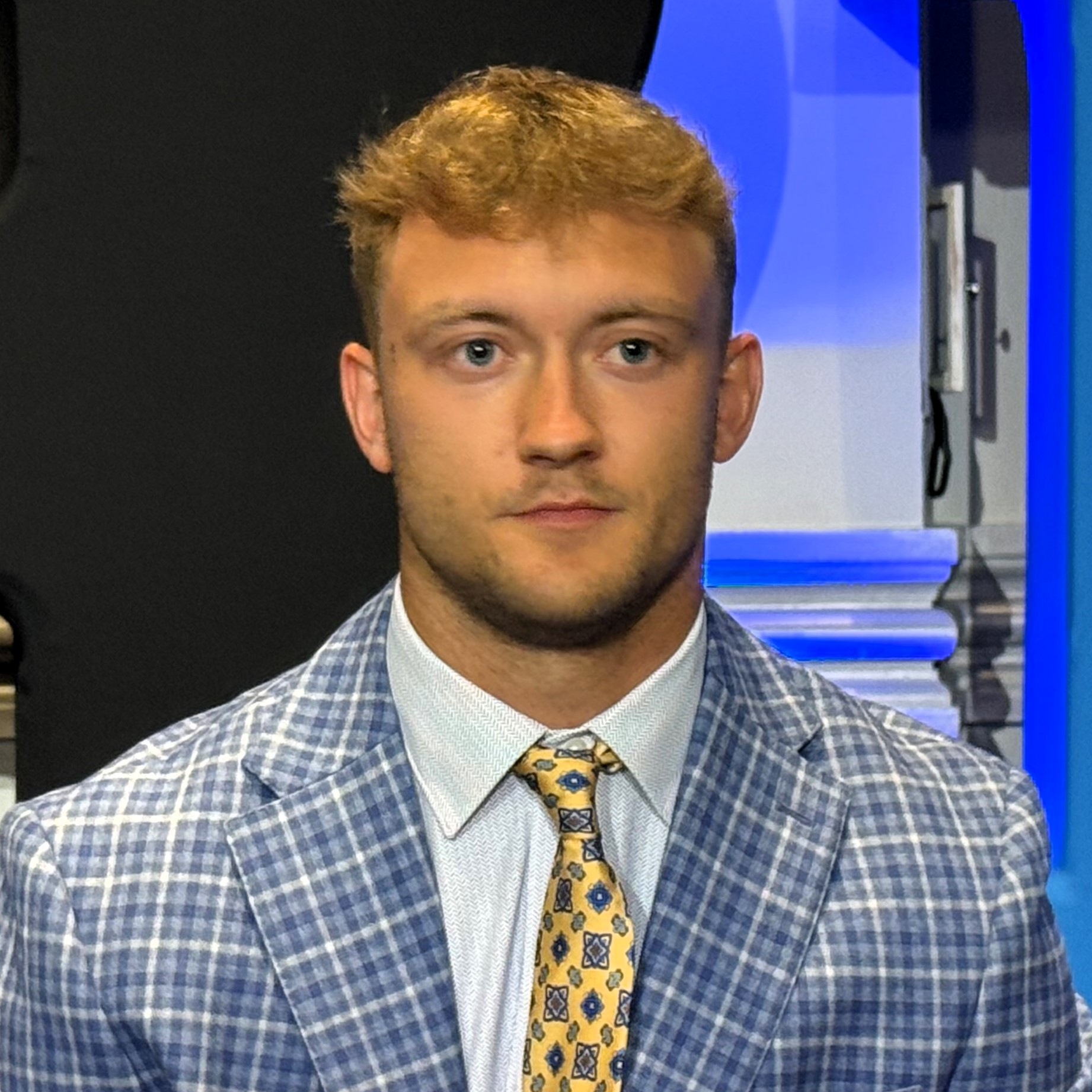
- Lutmer at 2026 Big Ten Media Day

No. 6 – Iowa Hawkeyes
- Position: Defensive back
- Class: Redshirt Junior

Personal information
- Born: November 5, 2004 (age 22)
- Listed height: 6 ft 0 in (1.83 m)
- Listed weight: 205 lb (93 kg)

Career information
- High school: Central Lyon (Rock Rapids, Iowa)
- College: Iowa (2023–present)

Awards and highlights
- Second-team All-Big Ten (2025)
- Stats at ESPN

Zach Lutmer (born November 5, 2004) is an American college football defensive back for the Iowa Hawkeyes.

== Early life ==
Lutmer attended Central Lyon High School in Rock Rapids, Iowa, where he played defensive back and quarterback. During his career he set school records for total yards, rushing yards and points scored. As a sophomore, Lutmer was the Class 2A Player of the Year after recording 1,194 passing yards, eight passing touchdowns, 1,609 rushing yards with 23 rushing touchdowns on offense and four interceptions, with two returned for a touchdown on defense. As a junior, he had 1,016 passing yards with eight touchdowns, 1,246 rushing yards with 22 touchdowns, and four interceptions with one returned for a touchdown. During his senior year he had 1,357 passing yards with 16 touchdowns, 1,562 rushing yards with 22 touchdowns and three interceptions. Lutmer committed to the University of Iowa to play college football.

== College career ==
Lutmer played in two games and redshirted his first year at Iowa in 2023. As a redshirt freshman in 2024, he played in all 13 games and had 14 tackles and one interception. Lutmer entered his redshirt sophomore year in 2025 as a starter.
