= A'Mauri Washington =

American football player

No. 52 – Oregon Ducks
- Position: Defensive tackle
- Class: Senior

Personal information
- Listed height: 6 ft 3 in (1.91 m)
- Listed weight: 320 lb (145 kg)

Career information
- High school: Chandler (Chandler, Arizona)
- College: Oregon (2023–present)

Awards and highlights
- First-team All-American (2025); Third-team All-Big Ten (2025)
- Stats at ESPN

A'Mauri Washington is an American college football defensive tackle for the Oregon Ducks.

== Early life ==
Washington attended Oak Park High School in Oak Park, Michigan for his freshman and sophomore years before transferring to Chandler High School in Chandler, Arizona for his junior and senior years. He committed to the University of Oregon to play college football.

== College career ==
Washington was a backup his first two years at Oregon in 2023 and 2024, appearing in 22 games and recording 12 tackles. He became a starter for the first time his junior year in 2025.
