= Iapani Laloulu =

American football player (born 2004)

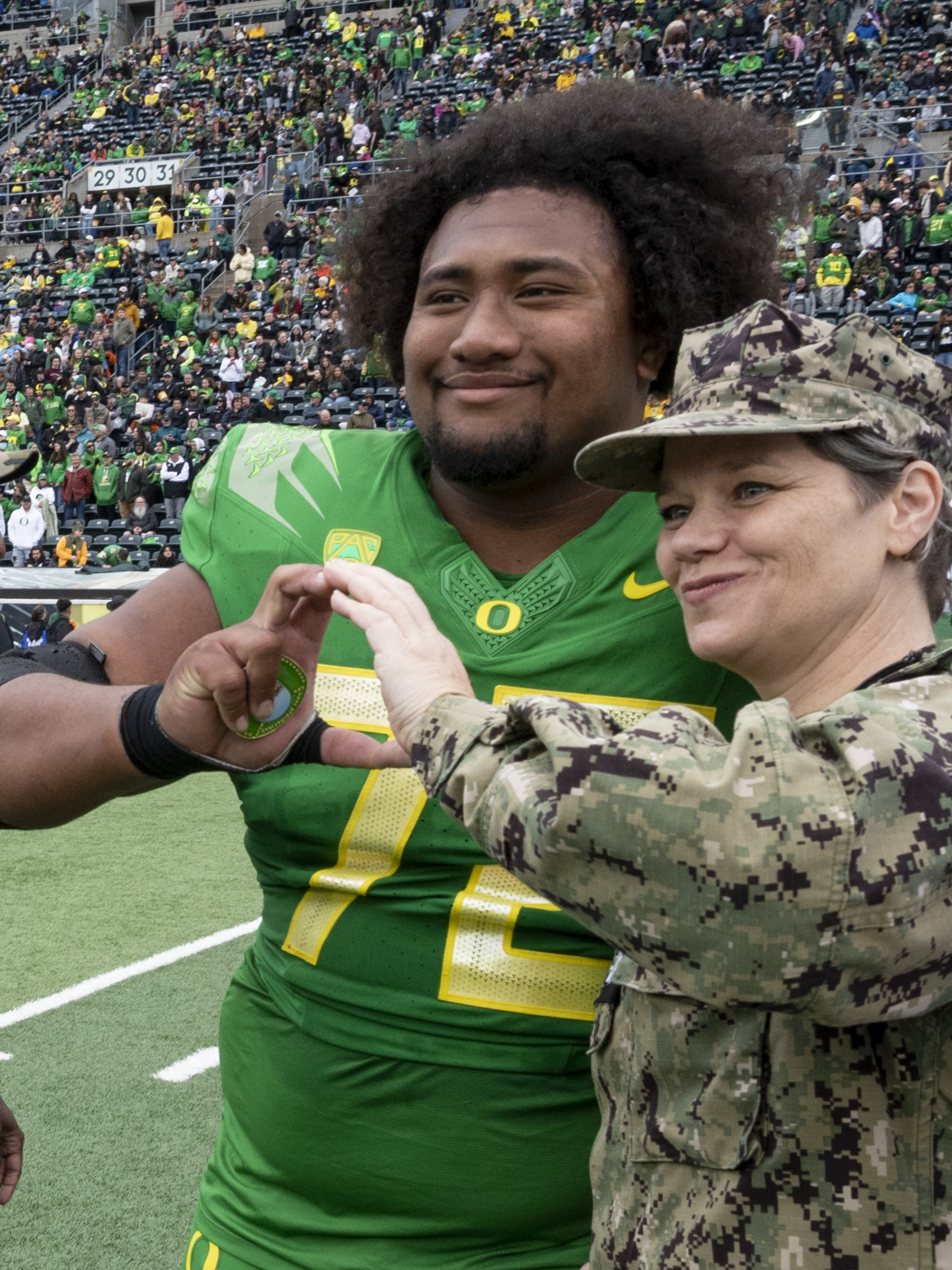
- Laloulu takes a photo with a USMC Reserve member at Autzen Stadium in 2024

No. 72 – Oregon Ducks
- Position: Center
- Class: Senior

Personal information
- Born: June 25, 2004 (age 22)
- Listed height: 6 ft 2 in (1.88 m)
- Listed weight: 325 lb (147 kg)

Career information
- High school: Farrington (Honolulu, Hawaii)
- College: Oregon (2023–present)

Awards and highlights
- First-team All-American (2025); Second-team All-Big Ten (2025)
- Stats at ESPN

Iapani Laloulu (born June 25, 2004) is an American college football center for the Oregon Ducks.

== Early life ==
Laloulu attended Farrington High School in Honolulu, Hawaii his freshman, sophomore and senior years and Saint Louis School in Honolulu his junior year. He was selected to the play in the 2023 Under Armour All-America Game. He committed to the University of Oregon to play college football.

== College career ==
As a true freshman at Oregon in 2023, Laloulu played both center and guard. He appeared in all 14 games and made one start, which came in the Fiesta Bowl. As a sophomore in 2024, he took over as the starting center.
