= Cooper Catalano =

American football player

No. 44 – Wisconsin Badgers
- Position: Linebacker
- Class: Sophomore

Personal information
- Listed height: 6 ft 1 in (1.85 m)
- Listed weight: 232 lb (105 kg)

Career information
- High school: Germantown (Germantown, Wisconsin)
- College: Wisconsin (2025–present)
- Stats at ESPN

Cooper Catalano is an American college football linebacker for the Wisconsin Badgers.

== Early life ==
Catalano is from Richfield, Wisconsin. At age five, he was diagnosed with type 1 diabetes. He attended Germantown High School where he played football as a linebacker, posting 11 tackles in his first game and finishing with 120 tackles and 11 tackles-for-loss (TFLs) as a freshman. Described by coaches as a "tackling machine", he posted 147 tackles and 19 TFLs as a sophomore. He was named honorable mention all-state as a junior in 2023, when he posted 138 tackles and 18 TFLs. Catalano broke the state record for career tackles as a senior in 2024, finishing his high school career with 583 tackles. He had 178 tackles in his senior year and was named the Wisconsin large school defensive player of the year; he finished having been named all-conference in each of his four seasons, as well as won conference player of the year three times. A three-star recruit, he committed to play college football for the Wisconsin Badgers.

== College career ==
Catalano joined Wisconsin in 2025 and impressed early. Against Washington on November 8, he posted 19 tackles in a 13–10 win, afterwards being named the Big Ten Conference Defensive Player of the Week.
