= Kayden McDonald =

American football player (born 2005)

No. 93 – Houston Texans
- Position: Defensive tackle
- Roster status: Active

Personal information
- Born: March 12, 2005 (age 21); Texarkana, Arkansas, U.S.
- Listed height: 6 ft 3 in (1.91 m)
- Listed weight: 326 lb (148 kg)

Career information
- High school: North Gwinnett (Suwanee, Georgia)
- College: Ohio State (2023–2025)
- NFL draft: 2026: 2nd round, 36th overall pick

Career history
- Houston Texans (2026–present)

Awards and highlights
- Unanimous All-American (2025); CFP national champion (2024); Big Ten Defensive Lineman of the Year (2025); First-team All-Big Ten (2025)
- Stats at Pro Football Reference

Kayden McDonald (born March 12, 2005) is an American professional football defensive tackle for the Houston Texans of the National Football League (NFL). He played college football for the Ohio State Buckeyes and was selected by the Texans in the second round of the 2026 NFL draft.

== Early life ==
McDonald was born in Texarkana, Arkansas and grew up in the Atlanta area. He attended North Gwinnett High School in Suwanee, Georgia. McDonald was rated as a four star recruit, and the 290th overall player in the class of 2023, where he committed to play college football for the Ohio State Buckeyes over offers from 35 other schools.

== College career ==
As a freshman in 2023, McDonald appeared in four games, making one tackle. In week 2 of the 2024 season, McDonald tallied three tackles in a win over Western Michigan. In week 10, he notched one tackle, helping the Buckeyes stop the Nittany Lions from scoring on third down late in the fourth quarter, to help the Buckeyes survive beating Penn State 20–13. During the 2024 season, McDonald played in all 16 games, recording 19 tackles with two being for a loss, and a pass deflection.

== Professional career ==
Pre-draft measurables
Height	Weight	Arm length	Hand span	Wingspan	Bench press
6 ft 2 1/8 in (1.88 m)	326 lb (148 kg)	32 1/4 in (0.82 m)	9 3/4 in (0.25 m)	6 ft 6 1/8 in (1.98 m)	27 reps
All values from NFL Combine/Pro Day

McDonald was selected by the Houston Texans with the 36th overall pick in the second round of the 2026 NFL draft. On May 9, 2026, he signed a four-year, $12.9 million contract with the Texans. On September 11, McDonald was placed on injured reserve due to an ankle injury.
