= Drew Shelton =

American football player (born 2003)

No. 67 – Dallas Cowboys
- Position: Offensive tackle
- Roster status: Active

Personal information
- Born: December 26, 2003 (age 22)
- Listed height: 6 ft 5 in (1.96 m)
- Listed weight: 313 lb (142 kg)

Career information
- High school: Downingtown West (Downingtown, Pennsylvania)
- College: Penn State (2022–2025)
- NFL draft: 2026: 4th round, 112th overall pick

Career history
- Dallas Cowboys (2026–present)

Career NFL statistics as of Week 4, 2026
- Games played: 4
- Stats at Pro Football Reference

Andrew King Shelton (born December 26, 2003) is an American professional football offensive tackle for the Dallas Cowboys of the National Football League (NFL). He played college football for the Penn State Nittany Lions and was selected by the Cowboys in the fourth round of the 2026 NFL draft.

== Early life ==
Shelton is from Downingtown, Pennsylvania. He grew up playing baseball and started playing football in middle school. He attended Dowingtown West High School, where he played football and basketball, before transferring to IMG Academy in Florida, then returned to Downingtown for his senior year. At Downingtown West, he played alongside quarterback Will Howard and helped the school win the District 1 championship in 2019, their first since 1996. He was ranked a four-star prospect and the third-best player in Pennsylvania and committed to play college football for the Penn State Nittany Lions.

== College career ==
Although Shelton initially intended to redshirt during the 2022 season as a freshman, he ended up playing in seven games and started the final five at left tackle in place of the injured Olu Fashanu. The following year, he played in all 13 games as a rotational player, starting one. He then became a starter as a junior in 2024, starting 12 games while allowing only two sacks. He returned for his senior season in 2025, where he started 12 games.

== Professional career ==
Pre-draft measurables
Height	Weight	Arm length	Hand span	Wingspan	40-yard dash	10-yard split	20-yard split	Vertical jump	Broad jump
6 ft 5 1/8 in (1.96 m)	313 lb (142 kg)	33 3/8 in (0.85 m)	9 5/8 in (0.24 m)	6 ft 10 3/8 in (2.09 m)	5.16 s	1.79 s	2.99 s	31.0 in (0.79 m)	9 ft 4 in (2.84 m)
All values from NFL Combine

Shelton was selected by the Dallas Cowboys in the fourth round with the 112th overall pick of the 2026 NFL draft.
