= Austin Siereveld =

American football player (born 2004)

No. 67 – Ohio State Buckeyes
- Position: Guard
- Class: Redshirt Junior

Personal information
- Born: December 1, 2004 (age 21)
- Listed height: 6 ft 5 in (1.96 m)
- Listed weight: 325 lb (147 kg)

Career information
- High school: Lakota East (Liberty Township, Ohio)
- College: Ohio State (2023–present)

Awards and highlights
- CFP national champion (2024); Second-team All-Big Ten (2025)
- Stats at ESPN

Austin Siereveld (born December 1, 2004) is an American college football guard for the Ohio State Buckeyes.

== Early life ==
Siereveld attended Lakota East High School located in Liberty Township, Butler County, Ohio. During his high school career, he played football, basketball, and lacrosse, where he was named all-Southwest District and all-Greater Miami Conference twice for football. Coming out of high school, Siereveld was rated as a four star recruit, the 15th overall player in the State of Ohio, and the 246th overall player in the class of 2023, where he committed to play college football for the Ohio State Buckeyes over offers from other schools such as Alabama, Cincinnati, Georgia Tech, Illinois, Iowa, Kentucky, Michigan, Michigan State, Notre Dame, Ohio, Penn State, Purdue, Tennessee, Toledo and West Virginia.

== College career ==
During his first collegiate season in 2023, he used the season to redshirt. In week one of the 2024 season, Siereveld made his first collegiate start versus Akron. He finished the 2024 season, appearing in all 16 games while making seven starts, as he helped the team to a National Champiosnhip win. Heading into the 2025 season, Siereveld is projected to be one of the starting guards on the Buckeyes offensive line.
