= Trevor Lauck =

American football player (born 2004)

No. 59 – Iowa Hawkeyes
- Position: Offensive tackle
- Class: Redshirt Junior

Personal information
- Born: September 27, 2004 (age 22); Indianapolis, Indiana
- Listed height: 6 ft 5 in (1.96 m)
- Listed weight: 310 lb (141 kg)

Career information
- High school: Roncalli (Indianapolis, Indiana)
- College: Iowa (2023–present)

Awards and highlights
- Joe Moore Award (2025) (Note: As part of the Iowa Hawkeyes offensive line); Third-team All-Big Ten (2025)
- Stats at ESPN

Trevor Lauck (born September 27, 2004) is an American college football offensive tackle for the Iowa Hawkeyes.

== Career ==
Lauck attended Roncalli High School in Indianapolis, Indiana. He was selected to play in the 2023 All-American Bowl. Lauck committed to University of Iowa to play college football.

After playing in only three games in his first two years at Iowa in 2023 and 2024, Lauck took over as the starting left tackle in 2025. That season, he started all 13 games, was named third-team All-Big Ten, and contributed to the Hawkeyes' offensive line being selected as recipients of the Joe Moore Award.
