= Caleb Tiernan =

American football player (born 2003)

No. 78 – Minnesota Vikings
- Position: Offensive tackle
- Roster status: Active

Personal information
- Born: January 23, 2003 (age 23); Livonia, Michigan, U.S.
- Listed height: 6 ft 8 in (2.03 m)
- Listed weight: 323 lb (147 kg)

Career information
- High school: Detroit Country Day (Beverly Hills, Michigan)
- College: Northwestern (2021–2025)
- NFL draft: 2026: 3rd round, 97th overall pick

Career history
- Minnesota Vikings (2026–present)

Awards and highlights
- Second-team All-Big Ten (2025)

Career NFL statistics as of Week 10, 2026
- Games played: 4
- Stats at Pro Football Reference

Caleb Tiernan (born January 23, 2003) is an American professional football offensive tackle for the Minnesota Vikings of the National Football League (NFL). He played college football for the Northwestern Wildcats and was selected by the Vikings in the third round of the 2026 NFL draft.

== Early life ==
Tiernan attended Detroit Country Day School in Beverly Hills, Michigan. A four-star recruit, he committed to play college football at Northwestern University over offers from Michigan, Ohio State, and Penn State.

== College career ==
After playing sparingly and redshirting in 2021, Tiernan's role increased, starting every game during the 2023 and 2024 seasons. He returned for his redshirt senior season in 2025.

== Professional career ==
Pre-draft measurables
Height	Weight	Arm length	Hand span	Wingspan	20-yard shuttle	Three-cone drill	Vertical jump	Broad jump
6 ft 7 5/8 in (2.02 m)	323 lb (147 kg)	32 1/4 in (0.82 m)	9 in (0.23 m)	6 ft 7 1/2 in (2.02 m)	4.71 s	8.08 s	35.5 in (0.90 m)	9 ft 3 in (2.82 m)
All values from NFL Combine/Pro Day

Tiernan was selected by the Minnesota Vikings in the third round with the 97th overall pick of the 2026 NFL draft.
