= Luke Basso =

American football player (born 2003)

Profile
- Position: Long snapper

Personal information
- Born: May 17, 2003 (age 23); Lake Oswego, Oregon, U.S.
- Listed height: 6 ft 3 in (1.91 m)
- Listed weight: 246 lb (112 kg)

Career information
- High school: Lakeridge (Lake Oswego, Oregon)
- College: Oregon (2021–2025)
- NFL draft: 2026: undrafted

Career history
- Denver Broncos (2026)*; Miami Dolphins (2026)*
- * Offseason or practice squad member only

Awards and highlights
- 2× First-team All-Big Ten (2024, 2025)
- Stats at Pro Football Reference

Luke Basso (born May 17, 2003) is an American professional football long snapper. He played college football for the Oregon Ducks and was signed by the Denver Broncos as an undrafted free agent in 2026.

== Early life ==
Basso attended Lakeridge High School in Lake Oswego, Oregon. Coming out of high school, he was rated as a five-star long snapper, where he committed to play college football for the Oregon Ducks, joining the team as a preferred walk-on.

== College career ==
As a freshman in 2021, Basso did not appear in any games and used the season to redshirt. In the 2022 season, he rotated as the team's long snapper, playing in ten games. During the 2023 season, Basso took over as the team's full time long snapper, playing in all 14 games. In 2024, he retained his starting snapper spot, playing in all 14 games. For his performance during the 2025 season, Basso accepted an invite to participate in the 2026 Senior Bowl.

== Professional career ==
Pre-draft measurables
Height	Weight	Arm length	Hand span	Wingspan	40-yard dash	10-yard split	20-yard split	20-yard shuttle	Three-cone drill	Vertical jump	Broad jump	Bench press
6 ft 3 1/2 in (1.92 m)	246 lb (112 kg)	31 7/8 in (0.81 m)	9 in (0.23 m)	6 ft 4 1/2 in (1.94 m)	5.05 s	1.78 s	2.89 s	4.59 s	7.63 s	30.0 in (0.76 m)	9 ft 1 in (2.77 m)	16 reps
All values from Pro Day

=== Denver Broncos ===
After going unselected in the 2026 NFL draft, Basso signed with the Denver Broncos as an undrafted free agent. On August 30, Basso was waived by the Broncos as a part of final roster cuts. He was re-signed to the team's practice squad the next day. On September 7, Basso was released from the practice squad.

=== Miami Dolphins ===
On September 22, 2026, Basso signed with the Miami Dolphins' practice squad and was released two days later.
