= Aaron Graves =

American football player (born 2003)

Profile
- Position: Defensive end

Personal information
- Born: July 14, 2003 (age 23); Gowrie, Iowa, U.S.
- Listed height: 6 ft 5 in (1.96 m)
- Listed weight: 292 lb (132 kg)

Career information
- High school: Southeast Valley (Gowrie)
- College: Iowa (2022–2025)
- NFL draft: 2026: undrafted

Career history
- Baltimore Ravens (2026)*; Houston Texans (2026)*
- * Offseason or practice squad member only

Awards and highlights
- Second-team All-Big Ten (2025)
- Stats at ESPN

Aaron Graves (born July 14, 2003) is an American professional football defensive end. He played college football at Iowa.

== Early life ==
Graves attended Southeast Valley High School, where he participated in football, basketball, track and field, and wrestling. As a freshman, he tallied 67 tackles with 15 being for a loss, and ten sacks. As a senior, Graves totaled 18.5 tackles for loss, and eight and a half sacks. He was named the MaxPreps Male National Athlete of the Year. Graves committed to play college football for the Iowa Hawkeyes.

== College career ==
Graves made his collegiate debut in week 2 of the 2022 season versus Iowa State. He finished his freshman season in 2022 notching 15 tackles with six being for a loss, and three sacks. In 2023, Graves 37 tackles with four and a half going for a loss, two and a half sacks, a pass deflection, and a forced fumble.

== Professional career ==
Pre-draft measurables
| Height | Weight | Arm length | Hand span | Wingspan | 40-yard dash | 10-yard split | 20-yard split | 20-yard shuttle | Three-cone drill | Vertical jump | Broad jump | Bench press |
|---|---|---|---|---|---|---|---|---|---|---|---|---|
| 6 ft 4 3/4 in (1.95 m) | 292 lb (132 kg) | 30 1/4 in (0.77 m) | 9 3/8 in (0.24 m) | 6 ft 2 5/8 in (1.90 m) | 5.32 s | 1.79 s | 3.04 s | 4.69 s | 7.50 s | 34.5 in (0.88 m) | 8 ft 11 in (2.72 m) | 22 reps |
All values from Pro Day

=== Baltimore Ravens ===
Graves signed with the Baltimore Ravens as an undrafted free agent on April 26, 2026. On August 30, Graves was waived by the Ravens.

=== Houston Texans ===
On September 30, 2026, Graves was signed to the Houston Texans' practice squad. He was released on October 20.
