= Isaiah World =

American football player (born 2003)

No. 67 – Los Angeles Chargers
- Position: Offensive tackle
- Roster status: Injured reserve

Personal information
- Born: September 16, 2003 (age 23)
- Listed height: 6 ft 8 in (2.03 m)
- Listed weight: 318 lb (144 kg)

Career information
- High school: Lincoln (San Diego, California)
- College: Nevada (2021–2024); Oregon (2025)
- NFL draft: 2026: undrafted

Career history
- Los Angeles Chargers (2026–present)

Awards and highlights
- Second-team All-Big Ten (2025)
- Stats at Pro Football Reference

Isaiah World (born September 16, 2003) is an American professional football offensive tackle for the Los Angeles Chargers of the National Football League (NFL). He played college football for the Nevada Wolf Pack and Oregon Ducks.

== Early life ==
World attended Lincoln High School in San Diego, California. He originally committed to play college football at Arizona State University before flipping his commitment to the University of Nevada, Reno.

== College career ==
World played at Nevada from 2021 to 2024. After redshirting his first year in 2021, he became a starter his redshirt freshman season in 2022. Over the four years he started 35 of 36 games. After the 2024 season, World entered the transfer portal and was ranked as the number one overall player by 247Sports. He transferred to the University of Oregon.

On February 17, 2026, it was announced that World would miss the NFL Combine after suffering a torn ACL in the team's playoff loss to the Indiana Hoosiers.

== Professional career ==
Pre-draft measurables
Height	Weight	Arm length	Hand span	Wingspan
6 ft 5 1/2 in (1.97 m)	323 lb (147 kg)	34 1/2 in (0.88 m)	9 3/4 in (0.25 m)	6 ft 9 in (2.06 m)
All values from NFL Combine

After going undrafted in the 2026 NFL draft, World signed with the Los Angeles Chargers as an undrafted free agent. He was waived/injured by the team on August 30, 2026.
