= 2024 Ohio State Buckeyes football team =

American college football season

2024 Ohio State Buckeyes football

Consensus national champion; Cotton Bowl Classic champion; Rose Bowl champion

CFP First Round, W 42–17 vs. Tennessee; Rose Bowl (CFP Quarterfinal), W 41–21 vs. Oregon; Cotton Bowl Classic (CFP Semifinal), W 28–14 vs. Texas; CFP National Championship, W 34–23 vs. Notre Dame
- Conference: Big Ten Conference

Ranking
- Coaches: No. 1
- AP: No. 1
- Record: 14–2 (7–2 Big Ten)
- Head coach: Ryan Day (6th season)
- Offensive coordinator: Chip Kelly (1st season)
- Co-offensive coordinator: Brian Hartline (2nd season)
- Offensive scheme: Spread option
- Defensive coordinator: Jim Knowles (3rd season)
- Base defense: 4–2–5
- Captains: Emeka Egbuka; TreVeyon Henderson; Jack Sawyer; Cody Simon
- Home stadium: Ohio Stadium

2024 Big Ten Conference football standings
	Conf.			Overall
Team	W		L	W		L
No. 3 Oregon y$^	9	–	0	13	–	1
No. 10 Indiana ^	8	–	1	11	–	2
No. 5 Penn State y^	8	–	1	13	–	3
No. 1 Ohio State #^	7	–	2	14	–	2
No. 16 Illinois	6	–	3	10	–	3
Iowa	6	–	3	8	–	5
Michigan	5	–	4	8	–	5
Minnesota	5	–	4	8	–	5
USC	4	–	5	7	–	6
Rutgers	4	–	5	7	–	6
Washington	4	–	5	6	–	7
Nebraska	3	–	6	7	–	6
UCLA	3	–	6	5	–	7
Wisconsin	3	–	6	5	–	7
Northwestern	2	–	7	4	–	8
Maryland	1	–	8	4	–	8
Michigan State†	0	–	6	0	–	7
Purdue	0	–	9	1	–	11
Championship: Oregon 45, Penn State 37
# – College Football Playoff champion; ^ – College Football Playoff participant; $ – Conference champion; y – Championship game participant; † — NCAA vacated all wins for Michigan State (5–7, 3–6); Rankings from AP Poll

The 2024 Ohio State Buckeyes football team represented the Ohio State University as a member of the Big Ten Conference during the 2024 NCAA Division I FBS football season. They were led by sixth-year head coach Ryan Day and played their home games at Ohio Stadium in Columbus, Ohio. It was the Buckeyes' 135th season overall and 112th as a member of the Big Ten.

As the favorites to win the Big Ten, Ohio State started the season 5–0 before falling 32–31 to No. 3 Oregon on the road at Autzen Stadium. Subsequent to the loss, the team won its next five, including one on the road against No. 3 Penn State and one at home against No. 5 Indiana. However, an upset home loss to unranked Michigan, a fourth consecutive loss in the rivalry, knocked them out of the Big Ten Championship Game. Ohio State still qualified for the 2024–25 College Football Playoff and was selected as the No. 8 seed. They defeated No. 9 seed Tennessee in the first round, 42–17, and avenged their regular season loss against No. 1 seed Oregon, defeating them 41–21 in the Rose Bowl. They subsequently defeated No. 5 seed Texas 28–14 in the Cotton Bowl Classic to advance to the CFP National Championship, where they defeated No. 7 seed Notre Dame 34–23, claiming their first national championship since the 2014 season. The Buckeyes were the first 12-team College Football Playoff champion (winning four playoff games), the first team since the 2007 LSU Tigers to win a national championship with two losses on the season, the first team to win the national championship without winning their respective conference championship game since the 2021 Georgia Bulldogs and the lowest-seeded team in college football history to win a championship. The Buckeyes also set an NCAA record for most wins against top-5 teams in a single season, with five.

== Offseason ==
Positions key
Offense	Defense	Special teams
QB — Quarterback; RB — Running back; FB — Fullback; WR — Wide receiver; TE — Tight end; OL — Offensive lineman; T — Tackle; G — Guard; C — Center	DL — Defensive lineman; DT — Defensive tackle (Note: Includes nose tackle (NT)); DE — Defensive end; EDGE — Edge rusher; LB — Linebacker (Note: Includes middle linebacker (MLB/MIKE), weakside linebacker (WILL), strongside linebacker (SAM), off-ball linebacker, and outside linebacker (OLB)); DB — Defensive back; CB — Cornerback; S — Safety (Note: Includes free safety (FS) and strong safety (SS))	K — Kicker (Note: Also known as a placekicker (PK)); P — Punter; LS — Long snapper; RS — Return specialist (Note: Includes kickoff and punt returners)

=== Coaching staff changes ===
==== Departures ====
Name	Position	New school	New position
Tony Alford	Assistant head coach for offense/running backs coach	Michigan	Run game coordinator/running backs coach
Mike Dawson	Program assistant - defense	Kansas	Senior analyst - defense
Corey Dennis	Quarterbacks coach	Tulsa	Quarterbacks coach/passing game coordinator
Perry Eliano	Safeties coach	Toledo	Cornerbacks coach
Todd Fitch	Senior analyst - offense	LSU	Sr. offensive analyst
Parker Fleming	Special teams coordinator	None	
Joe Philbin	Senior advisor/analyst - offense	Las Vegas Raiders	Senior offensive assistant

==== Additions ====
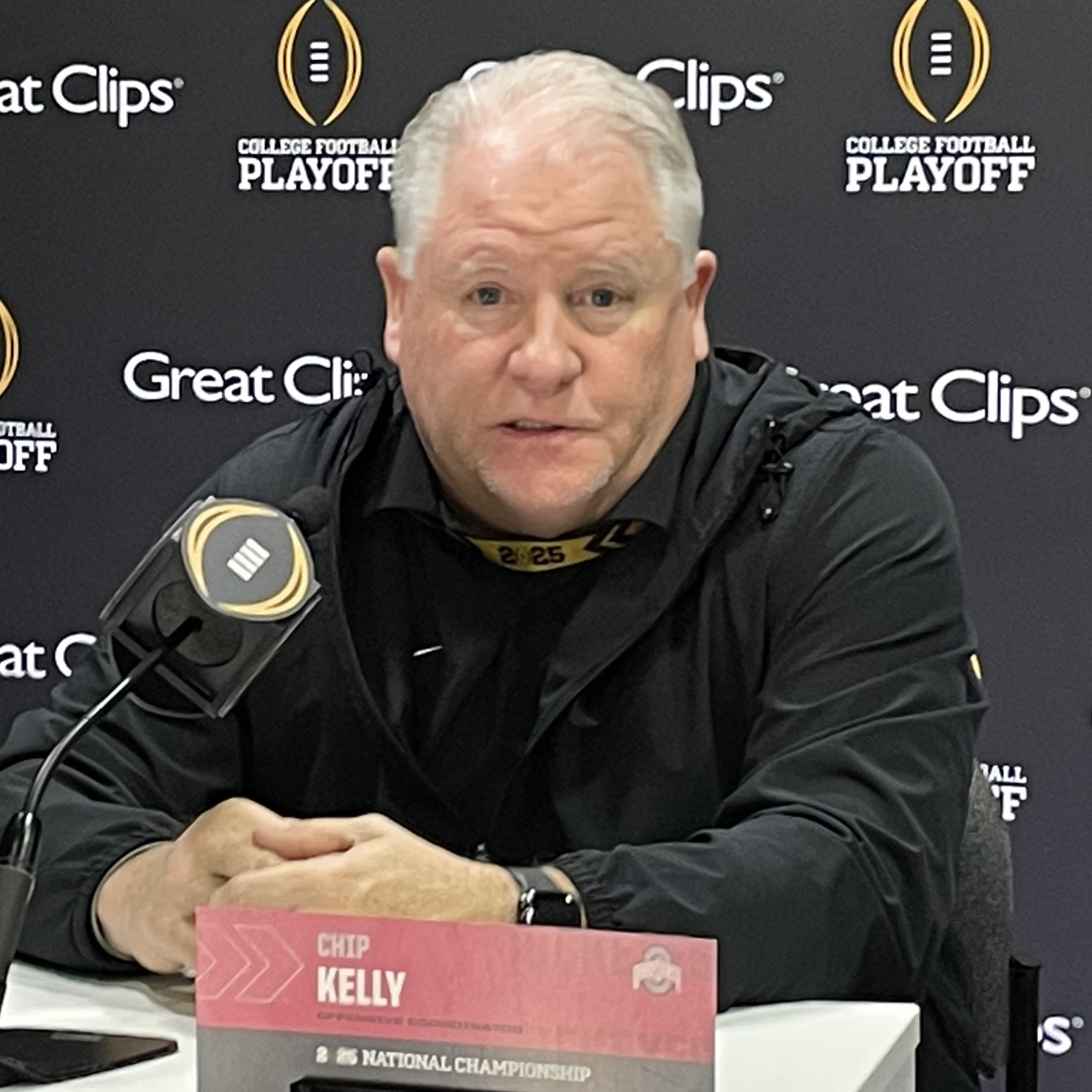
Chip Kelly joined the staff as offensive coordinator

Name	Position	Previous school	Previous position
Tim Drevno	Quality control - offense	UCLA	Offensive line coach
Matt Guerrieri	Safeties coach	Indiana	Co-defensive coordinator/safeties coach
Michael Hunter	Graduate assistant - defense	Tulsa	Defensive passing game coordinator/cornerbacks coach
Tony Johnson	Senior advisor/analyst	Olentangy Berkshire Middle School	Assistant coach
Brandon Jordan (Note: After being hired, Jordan left the program after three months.)	Program assistant - defense	Seattle Seahawks	Pass rush specialist
Chip Kelly	Offensive coordinator/quarterbacks coach	UCLA	Head coach
Carlos Locklyn	Running backs coach	Oregon	Running backs coach

=== Players drafted into the NFL ===
Round	Pick	NFL team	Player	Position
1	4	Arizona Cardinals	Marvin Harrison Jr.	WR
2	54	Cleveland Browns	Mike Hall Jr.	DT
4	123	Houston Texans	Cade Stover	TE
5	148	Las Vegas Raiders	Tommy Eichenberg	LB
Undrafted		Detroit Lions	Steele Chambers	LB
Undrafted		Buffalo Bills	Xavier Johnson	WR
Undrafted		Miami Dolphins	Matthew Jones	OL
Undrafted		Jacksonville Jaguars	Josh Proctor	S

=== Transfers ===
==== Outgoing ====
The Buckeyes lost 26 players to the transfer portal.

Player	Number	Position	Height	Weight	Class	Hometown	New school
Omari Abor	#23	DE	6'3"	258	Sophomore	Duncanville, Texas	SMU
Jyaire Brown	#18	CB	5'11"	183	Sophomore	New Orleans, Louisiana	LSU
Reid Carrico	#28	LB	6'2"	235	Junior	Ironton, Ohio	West Virginia
Ja'Had Carter	#14	S	6'1"	203	Senior	Richmond, Virginia	NC State
Connor Cmiel (Note: Cmiel played lacrosse and entered the football transfer portal.)	#8	WR	6'2"	200	Senior	Rocky River, Ohio	Coastal Carolina
Victor Cutler Jr.	#59	OL	6'3"	300	Graduate	West Monroe, Louisiana	Louisville
Julian Fleming	#4	WR	6'2"	210	Senior	Catawissa, Pennsylvania	Penn State
Nigel Glover	#37	LB	6'3"	210	Freshman	Clayton, Ohio	Northwestern
Kyion Grayes	#7	WR	6'0"	187	Sophomore	Chandler, Arizona	California
Sam Hart	#81	TE	6'5"	255	Junior	Aurora, Colorado	Colorado
Will Hartson	#30	RB	5'9"	205	Freshman	Massillon, Ohio	Southern Illinois
Cedrick Hawkins	#26	S	5'11"	182	Freshman	Titusville, Florida	UCF
Dallan Hayden	#5	RB	5'10"	205	Sophomore	Memphis, Tennessee	Colorado
Jakob James	#78	OL	6'5"	297	Senior	Cincinnati, Ohio	Toledo
Parker Lewis	#23	K	6'3"	220	Senior	Phoenix, Arizona	Arizona State
Cameron Martinez	#3	S	5'10"	198	Senior	Muskegon, Michigan	Boston College
Kyle McCord	#6	QB	6'3"	215	Junior	Mount Laurel, New Jersey	Syracuse
Jaden McKenzie	#90	DT	6'2"	286	Senior	Wake Forest, North Carolina	East Carolina
Jesse Mirco	#29	P	6'4"	220	Junior	Fremantle, Australia	Vanderbilt
Evan Pryor	#21	RB	5'11"	198	Junior	Cornelius, North Carolina	Cincinnati
Bryson Rodgers	#86	WR	6'2"	185	Freshman	Zephyrhills, Florida	Withdrew
Noah Rogers	#80	WR	6'2"	201	Freshman	Raleigh, North Carolina	NC State
Joe Royer	#84	TE	6'5"	255	Senior	Cincinnati, Ohio	Cincinnati
Kye Stokes	#13	S	6'1"	195	Sophomore	Seffner, Florida	Cincinnati
Chip Trayanum	#19	RB	5'11"	233	Senior	Akron, Ohio	Kentucky
Ryan Turner	#12	CB	5'11"	189	Sophomore	Hollywood, Florida	Boston College
Enokk Vimahi	#66	OL	6'4"	313	Senior	Kahuku, Hawaii	Washington

==== Incoming ====
The Buckeyes added 10 players from the transfer portal.

Player	Number	Position	Height	Weight	Class	Hometown	Previous school
Caleb Downs	#2	S	6'0"	205	Sophomore	Hoschton, Georgia	Alabama
Will Howard	#18	QB	6'4"	235	Graduate	Downingtown, Pennsylvania	Kansas State
Quinshon Judkins	#1	RB	6'0"	219	Junior	Pike Road, Alabama	Ole Miss
Will Kacmarek	#89	TE	6'6"	260	Senior	St. Louis, Missouri	Ohio
Seth McLaughlin	#56	OL	6'4"	305	Graduate	Buford, Georgia	Alabama
Keenan Nelson Jr.	#16	DB	6'1"	185	Junior	Philadelphia, Pennsylvania	South Carolina
Julian Sayin (Note: Sayin was an early enrollee at Alabama and transferred to Ohio State during that period.)	#10	QB	6'1"	203	Freshman	Carlsbad, California	Alabama
Anthony Venneri	#35	P	6'0"	225	Junior	Hamilton, Ontario	Buffalo

Selected Ohio State portal transfers
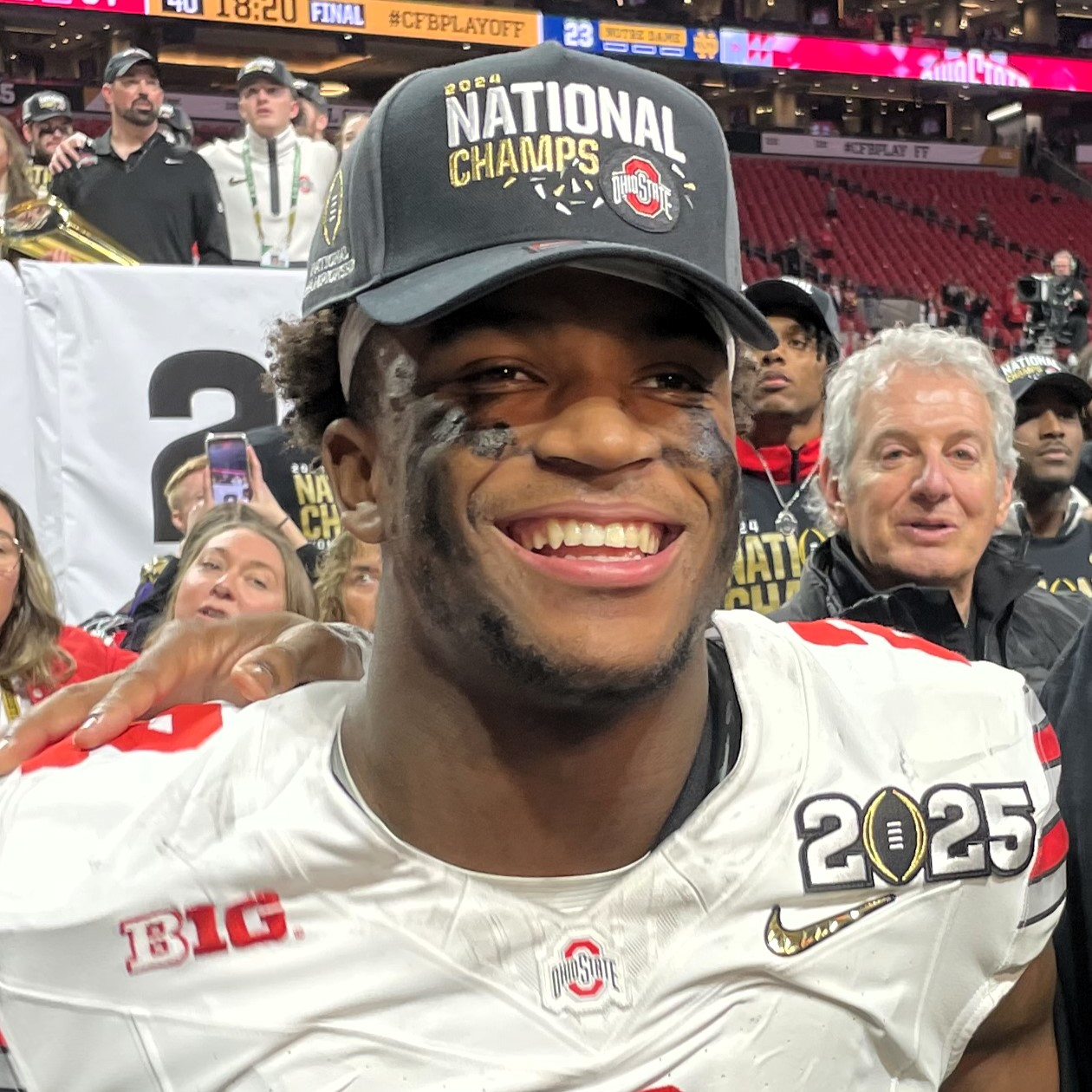
CB Caleb Downs

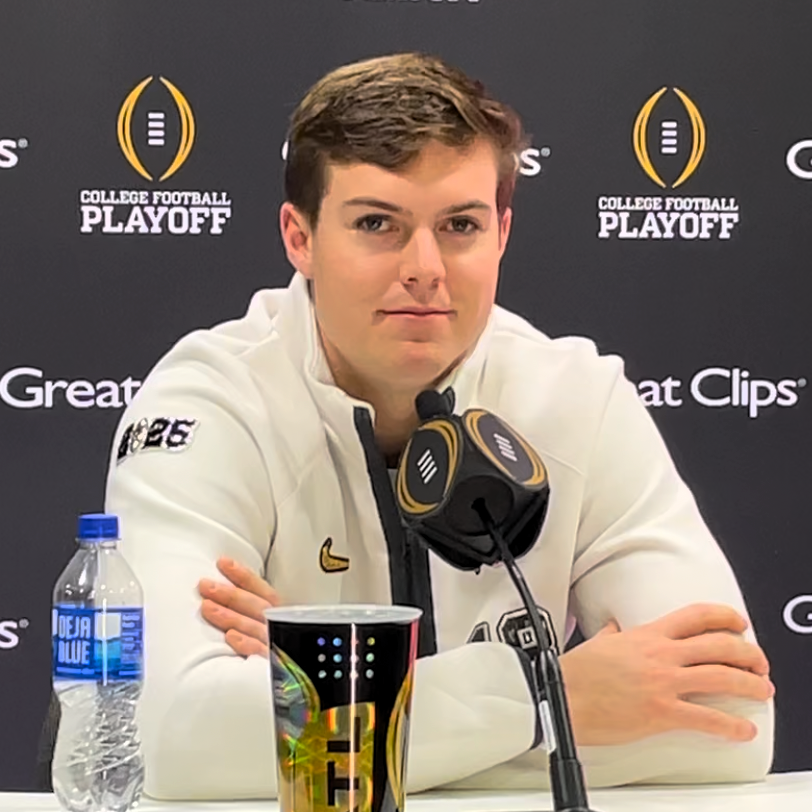
QB Will Howard

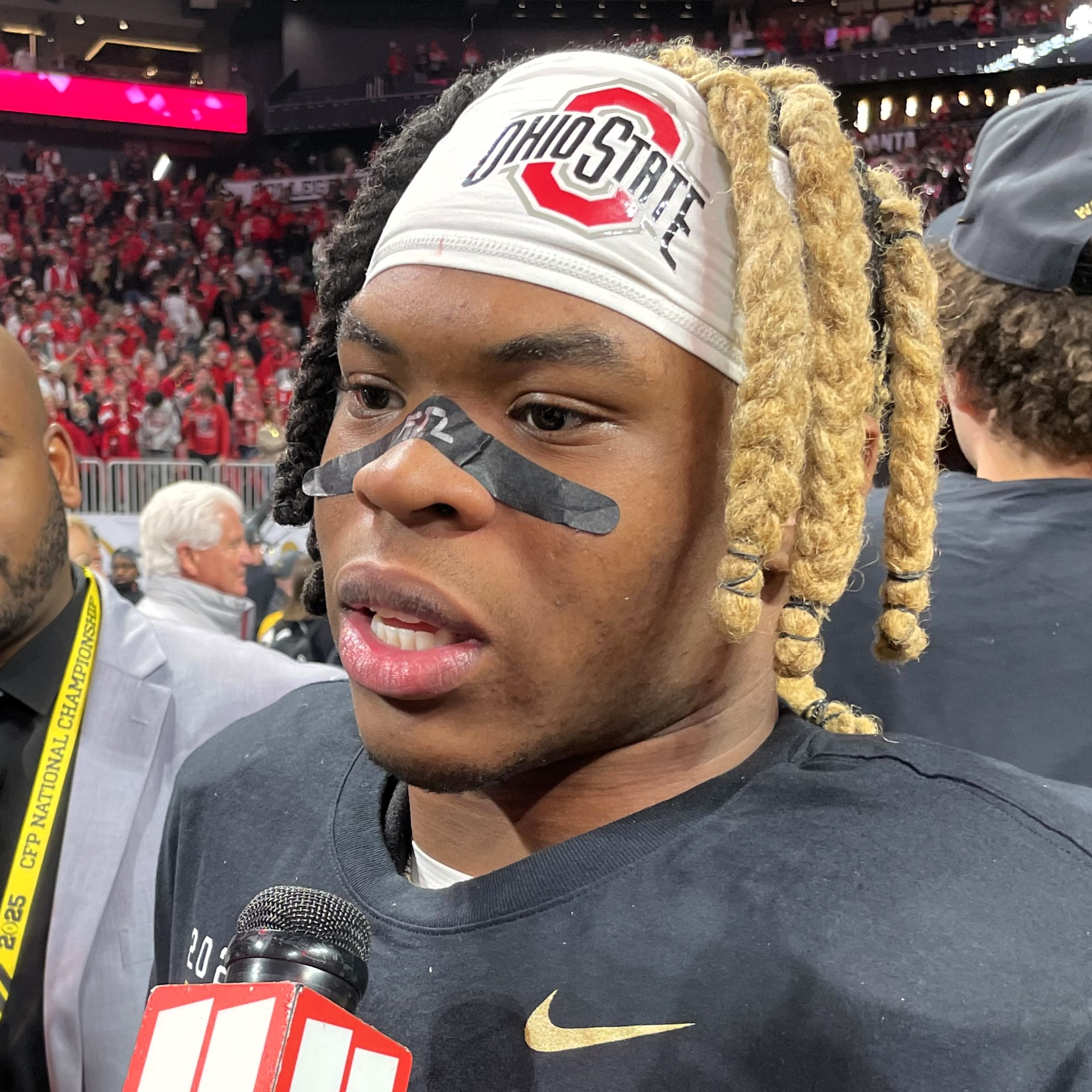
RB Quinshon Judkins

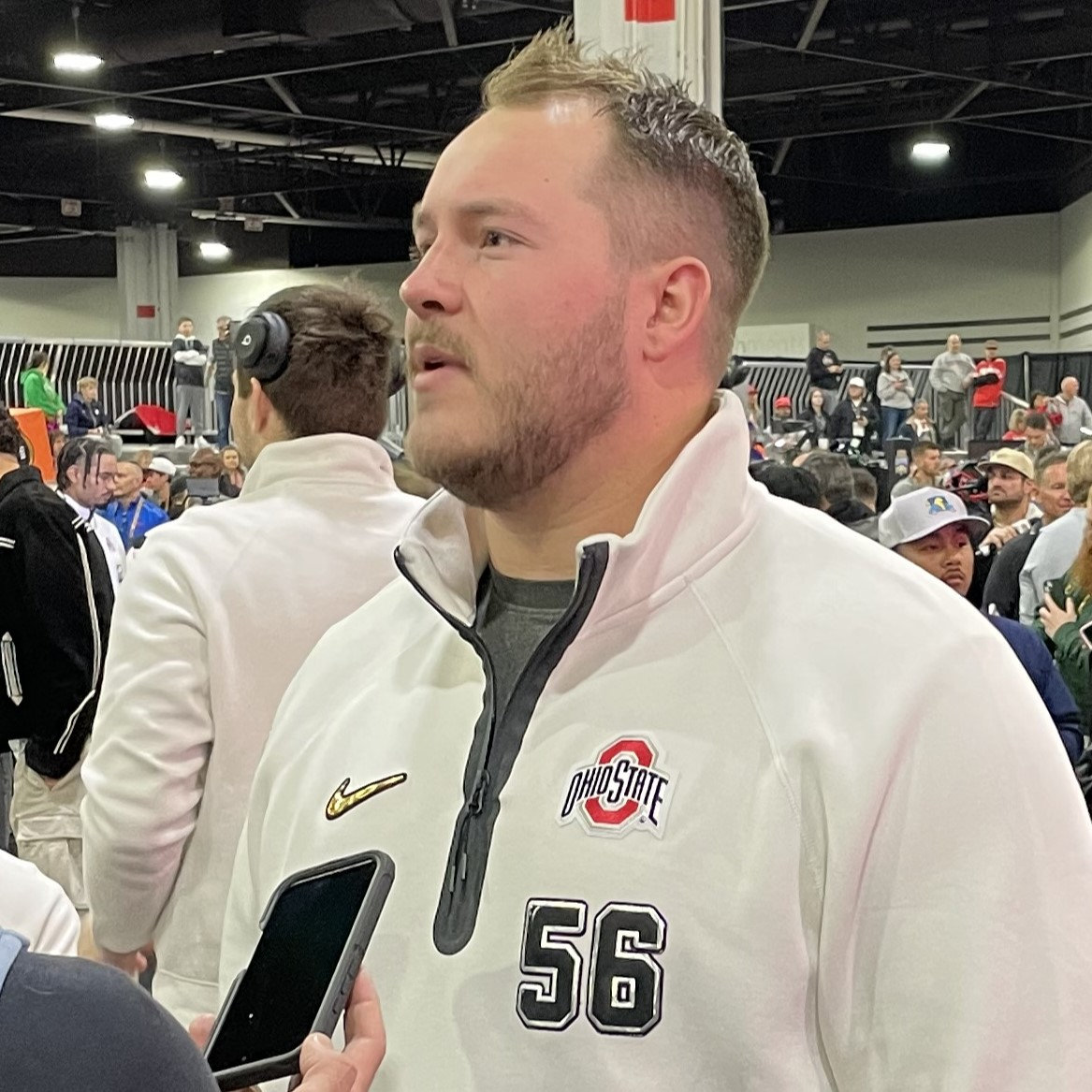
C Seth McLauglin
Photos from CFP National Championship week.

=== Recruiting class ===
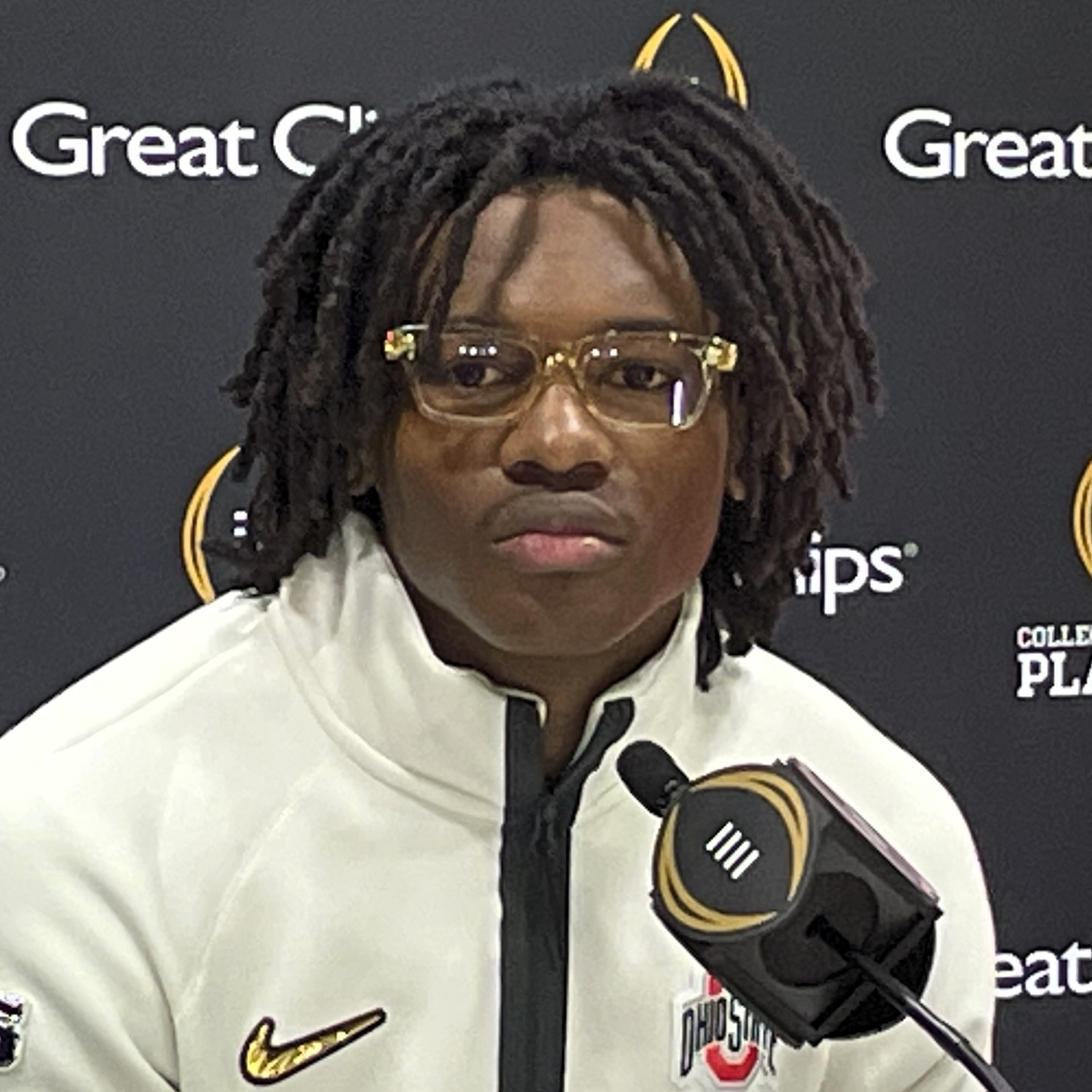
Freshman Jeremiah Smith was an immediate contributor.

College recruiting (2024)
Name	Hometown	School	Height	Weight	Commit date
Jeremiah Smith; WR	Hollywood, Florida	Chaminade-Madonna College Preparatory School	6 ft 3 in (1.91 m)	214 lb (97 kg)	Dec 14, 2022
Jeremiah Smith; WR	Recruit ratings: Rivals: 247Sports: ESPN: (92)				
Aaron Scott Jr. CB	Holland, Ohio	Springfield High School	6 ft 2 in (1.88 m)	190 lb (86 kg)	Jul 30, 2023
Aaron Scott Jr. CB	Recruit ratings: Rivals: 247Sports: ESPN: (88)				
Bryce West; CB	Cleveland, Ohio	Glenville High School	5 ft 11 in (1.80 m)	177 lb (80 kg)	Jun 24, 2023
Bryce West; CB	Recruit ratings: Rivals: 247Sports: ESPN: (87)				
Eddrick Houston; Edge	Buford, Georgia	Buford High School	6 ft 3 in (1.91 m)	269 lb (122 kg)	Aug 22, 2023
Eddrick Houston; Edge	Recruit ratings: Rivals: 247Sports: ESPN: (86)				
Mylan Graham; WR	New Haven, Indiana	New Haven High School	6 ft 1 in (1.85 m)	170 lb (77 kg)	Apr 4, 2023
Mylan Graham; WR	Recruit ratings: Rivals: 247Sports: ESPN: (86)				
Air Noland; QB	Fairburn, Georgia	Langston Hughes High School	6 ft 2 in (1.88 m)	195 lb (88 kg)	Apr 8, 2023
Air Noland; QB	Recruit ratings: Rivals: 247Sports: ESPN: (85)				
Ian Moore; IOL	New Palestine, Indiana	New Palestine High School	6 ft 6 in (1.98 m)	317 lb (144 kg)	Oct 20, 2022
Ian Moore; IOL	Recruit ratings: Rivals: 247Sports: ESPN: (83)				
Garrett Stover; S	Sunbury, Ohio	Big Walnut High School	6 ft 0 in (1.83 m)	214 lb (97 kg)	Nov 21, 2022
Garrett Stover; S	Recruit ratings: Rivals: 247Sports: ESPN: (83)				
Jaylen McClain; S	West Orange, New Jersey	Seton Hall Preparatory School	6 ft 0 in (1.83 m)	185 lb (84 kg)	Jun 12, 2023
Jaylen McClain; S	Recruit ratings: Rivals: 247Sports: ESPN: (83)				
Max LeBlanc; TE	Chattanooga, Tennessee	Baylor School	6 ft 3.5 in (1.92 m)	222 lb (101 kg)	Apr 15, 2023
Max LeBlanc; TE	Recruit ratings: Rivals: 247Sports: ESPN: (82)				
James Peoples; RB	San Antonio, Texas	Veterans Memorial High School	5 ft 9.5 in (1.77 m)	200 lb (91 kg)	Apr 2, 2023
James Peoples; RB	Recruit ratings: Rivals: 247Sports: ESPN: (82)				
Payton Pierce; LB	Lucas, Texas	Lovejoy High School	6 ft 1 in (1.85 m)	225 lb (102 kg)	Apr 11, 2023
Payton Pierce; LB	Recruit ratings: Rivals: 247Sports: ESPN: (82)				
Dominic Kirks; DL	Painesville, Ohio	Riverside High School	6 ft 4 in (1.93 m)	255 lb (116 kg)	Jan 20, 2024
Dominic Kirks; DL	Recruit ratings: Rivals: 247Sports: ESPN: (80)				
Deontae Armstrong; OT	Lakewood, Ohio	St. Edward High School	6 ft 6 in (1.98 m)	280 lb (130 kg)	Mar 27, 2023
Deontae Armstrong; OT	Recruit ratings: Rivals: 247Sports: ESPN: (80)				
Devontae Armstrong; OT	Lakewood, Ohio	St. Edward High School	6 ft 5 in (1.96 m)	297 lb (135 kg)	Mar 27, 2023
Devontae Armstrong; OT	Recruit ratings: Rivals: 247Sports: ESPN: (80)				
Miles Lockhart; CB	Chandler, Arizona	Basha High School	5 ft 10 in (1.78 m)	185 lb (84 kg)	Jul 6, 2023
Miles Lockhart; CB	Recruit ratings: Rivals: 247Sports: ESPN: (79)				
Damarion Witten; TE	Cleveland, Ohio	Glenville High School	6 ft 4 in (1.93 m)	215 lb (98 kg)	Jun 24, 2023
Damarion Witten; TE	Recruit ratings: Rivals: 247Sports: ESPN: (79)				
Eric Mensah; Edge	Stafford, Virginia	Mountain View High School	6 ft 3 in (1.91 m)	290 lb (130 kg)	Sep 15, 2023
Eric Mensah; Edge	Recruit ratings: Rivals: 247Sports: ESPN: (79)				
Gabe VanSickle; IOL	Coopersville, Michigan	Coopersville High School	6 ft 5 in (1.96 m)	283 lb (128 kg)	Nov 23, 2023
Gabe VanSickle; IOL	Recruit ratings: Rivals: 247Sports: ESPN: (78)				
Sam Williams-Dixon; RB	Pickerington, Ohio	Pickerington High School North	5 ft 11 in (1.80 m)	203 lb (92 kg)	Apr 15, 2023
Sam Williams-Dixon; RB	Recruit ratings: Rivals: 247Sports: ESPN: (77)				
Leroy Roker III; S	Fort Myers, Florida	Bishop Verot High School	6 ft 1 in (1.85 m)	170 lb (77 kg)	Oct 11, 2023
Leroy Roker III; S	Recruit ratings: Rivals: 247Sports: ESPN: (76)				
Nick McLarty; P	Melbourne, Victoria	Caulfield Grammar School	6 ft 7 in (2.01 m)	255 lb (116 kg)	Mar 8, 2024
Nick McLarty; P	Recruit ratings: Rivals: 247Sports: ESPN: (N/A)				
Overall recruit ranking: Rivals: 4 247Sports: 5 ESPN: —
Note: In many cases, Scout, Rivals, 247Sports, On3, and ESPN may conflict in their listings of height and weight.; In these cases, the average was taken. ESPN grades are on a 100-point scale.; Sources: "2024 Ohio State Football Commitment List". Rivals.; "2024 Ohio State Football Commitment List". ESPN.; "2024 Team Ranking". Rivals.com.; "Ohio State 2024 Football Commits". 247Sports.

==== Recruiting class rankings ====
Website	National rank	Conference rank	5 star recruits	4 star recruits	3 star recruits	Total
247Sports	5	2	1	12	8	22
ESPN	—	—	1	14	6	21
Rivals	4	2	3	14	4	21

==== Walk-ons ====
Player	Number	Position	Height	Weight	Class	Hometown	Previous school
Morrow Evans	#41	LS	6'1"	205	Freshman	Bellaire, Texas	Episcopal High School
Glorien Gough (Note: Gough played on Ohio State's club football team before walking-on.)	#29	DB	5'11"	175	Sophomore	Palos Verdes Estates, California	Mater Dei High School
Zach Hayes (Note: Hayes played on Ohio State's club football team before walking-on.)	#37	LB	6'3"	220	Freshman	La Grange Park, Illinois	Nazareth Academy
Hadi Jawad	#39	P	5'11"	185	Senior	Dearborn, Michigan	Wayne State
Shawn Lodge	#80	WR	6'0"	170	Junior	Akron, Ohio	Presbyterian
Simon Lorentz	#64	OL	6'3"	280	Freshman	Dover, Ohio	Dover High School
Buakri Miles Jr.	#34	CB	6'2"	190	Freshman	West Chester Township, Ohio	Lakota West High School
Nate Riegle	#66	LB	6'3"	210	Freshman	Findlay, Ohio	Findlay High School
Eli Riggs	#38	LB	6'4"	230	Freshman	Cincinnati, Ohio	Indian Hill High School
Rashid SeSay	#30	RB	5'11"	190	Freshman	Zanesville, Ohio	West Muskingum High School
Ahmed Tounkara	#59	DL	6'1"	260	Freshman	Dublin, Ohio	Dublin Scioto High School
Joey Velazquez	#39	LB	5'11"	226	Graduate	Columbus, Ohio	Michigan
Dorian Williams	#84	WR	6'2"	200	Freshman	Cincinnati, Ohio	Princeton High School

== Preseason ==
=== Spring game ===
Date	Time	Spring Game	Site	TV	Result	Attendance	Source
April 13	12:00 p.m.	Offense (Scarlet) vs. Defense (Gray)	Ohio Stadium • Columbus, OH	Fox	Offense 34-33	80,012	

== Schedule ==
Date	Time	Opponent	Rank	Site	TV	Result	Attendance
August 31	3:30 p.m.	Akron*	No. 2	Ohio Stadium; Columbus, OH	CBS	W 52–6	102,011
September 7	7:30 p.m.	Western Michigan*	No. 2	Ohio Stadium; Columbus, OH	BTN	W 56–0	102,665
September 21	12:00 p.m.	Marshall*	No. 3	Ohio Stadium; Columbus, OH (Big Noon Kickoff)	FOX	W 49–14	103,871
September 28	7:30 p.m.	at Michigan State	No. 3	Spartan Stadium; East Lansing, MI	Peacock	W 38–7	71,114
October 5	3:30 p.m.	Iowa	No. 3	Ohio Stadium; Columbus, OH	CBS	W 35–7	105,135
October 12	7:30 p.m.	at No. 3 Oregon	No. 2	Autzen Stadium; Eugene, OR (College GameDay)	NBC	L 31–32	60,129
October 26	12:00 p.m.	Nebraska^{†}	No. 4	Ohio Stadium; Columbus, OH (Big Noon Kickoff)	FOX	W 21–17	104,830
November 2	12:00 p.m.	at No. 3 Penn State	No. 4	Beaver Stadium; University Park, PA (rivalry, College GameDay, Big Noon Kickoff)	FOX	W 20–13	111,030
November 9	12:00 p.m.	Purdue	No. 2	Ohio Stadium; Columbus, OH	FOX	W 45–0	103,463
November 16	12:00 p.m.	at Northwestern	No. 2	Wrigley Field; Chicago, IL	BTN	W 31–7	38,147
November 23	12:00 p.m.	No. 5 Indiana	No. 2	Ohio Stadium; Columbus, OH (College GameDay, Big Noon Kickoff)	FOX	W 38–15	105,751
November 30	12:00 p.m.	Michigan	No. 2	Ohio Stadium; Columbus, OH (rivalry, Big Noon Kickoff)	FOX	L 10–13	106,005
December 21	8:00 p.m.	(9) No. 7 Tennessee*	(8) No. 6	Ohio Stadium; Columbus, OH (CFP First Round, College GameDay)	ESPN/ABC	W 42–17	102,819
January 1, 2025	5:00 p.m.	vs. (1) No. 1 Oregon*	(8) No. 6	Rose Bowl; Pasadena, CA (Rose Bowl–CFP Quarterfinal, College GameDay)	ESPN	W 41–21	90,732
January 10, 2025	7:30 p.m.	vs. (5) No. 3 Texas*	(8) No. 6	AT&T Stadium; Arlington, TX (Cotton Bowl Classic–CFP Semifinal, College GameDay)	ESPN	W 28–14	74,527
January 20, 2025	7:30 p.m.	vs. (7) No. 5 Notre Dame*	(8) No. 6	Mercedes-Benz Stadium; Atlanta, GA (CFP National Championship, College GameDay)	ESPN	W 34–23	77,660
*Non-conference game; ^{†}Homecoming; Rankings from AP Poll (and CFP Rankings, after November 5) - Released prior to game; All times are in Eastern time; Source:

== Rankings ==
Ranking movements Legend: ██ Increase in ranking ██ Decrease in ranking ( ) = First-place votes
	Week																
Poll	Pre	1	2	3	4	5	6	7	8	9	10	11	12	13	14	15	Final
AP	2 (15)	2 (5)	3 (5)	3 (5)	3 (5)	3 (4)	2 (9)	4	4	4	3	2	2	2	7	6	1 (56)
Coaches	2 (7)	2 (3)	2 (3)	3 (3)	3 (2)	3 (7)	2 (11)	5	4	4	3	2	2	2	8	7	1 (53)
CFP	Not released										2	2	2	2	6	6	Not released

== Game summaries ==
=== vs Akron ===
Akron Zips (0–0) vs No. 2 Ohio State Buckeyes (0–0) – Game summary

Quarter	1	2	3	4	Total
Zips	3	0	3	0	6
No. 2 Buckeyes	7	10	21	14	52

at Ohio Stadium • Columbus, Ohio

- Date: August 31
- Game time: 3:30 p.m. EDT
- Game weather: Cloudy • Temperature: 80 °F (27 °C) • Wind: NW at 6 miles per hour (9.7 km/h)
- Game attendance: 102,011
- Referee: Tim O'Dey
- TV announcers (CBS): Brad Nessler (play-by-play), Gary Danielson (analyst), and Jenny Dell (sideline reporter)
- Box score, Recap

Game information

First quarter

- (8:44) AKR – Garrison Smith 48-yard field goal (Drive: 10 plays, 47 yards, 5:18; Akron 3–0)
- (2:44) OSU – Jeremiah Smith 16-yard pass from Will Howard, Jayden Fielding kick (Drive: 14 plays, 75 yards, 6:00; Ohio State 7–3)

Second quarter

- (11:23) OSU – Jayden Fielding 40-yard field goal (Drive: 5 plays, 11 yards, 0:40; Ohio State 10–3)
- (4:30) OSU – Jeremiah Smith 9-yard pass from Will Howard, Jayden Fielding kick (Drive: 9 plays, 76 yards, 4:30; Ohio State 17–3)

Third quarter

- (7:53) OSU – Quinshon Judkins 2-yard run, Jayden Fielding kick (Drive: 3 plays, 60 yards, 0:52; Ohio State 24–3)
- (7:35) OSU – Lathan Ransom 27-yard fumble return, Jayden Fielding kick (Ohio State 31–3)
- (3:57) AKR – Garrison Smith 49-yard field goal (Drive: 7 plays, 44 yards, 3:38; Ohio State 31–6)
- (0:01) OSU – James Peoples 4-yard run, Jayden Fielding kick (Drive: 8 plays, 75 yards, 3:56; Ohio State 38–6)

Fourth quarter

- (10:16) OSU – Carnell Tate 34-yard pass from Will Howard, Jayden Fielding kick (Drive: 4 plays, 47 yards, 1:53; Ohio State 45–6)
- (2:25) OSU – Gabe Powers 29-yard interception return, Jayden Fielding kick (Ohio State 52–6)

On August 31, Ohio State opened their season by hosting the in-state Akron Zips from the MAC. Ohio State looked to continue their 108-year winning streak over in-state opponents. Two weeks before the game, Ryan Day named Kansas State transfer Will Howard Ohio State's starting quarterback for the 2024 season. Ohio State's injuries for the game included starting linebacker Cody Simon and left guard Donovan Jackson.

Ohio State got the ball first and went three-and-out after highly touted freshman Jeremiah Smith dropped his first career target, followed by a false start penalty and an incompletion. On Akron's first play, Ohio State cornerback Davison Igbinosun was nearly ejected for targeting after a late hit on sliding Akron quarterback Ben Finley, but it was overturned upon review. Backup quarterback Tahj Bullock would enter the game and lead the Zips down the field; they would take a 3–0 lead after a 48-yard field goal by Garrison Smith. Jeremiah Smith would make his first career catch on the next drive, an 11-yard reception to convert third-and-10. He would catch his first career touchdown on a 16-yard pass from Howard later in the drive, which gave Ohio State a 7–3 lead. A sack on second down by Buckeye linebacker C. J. Hicks would cause Akron's next drive to stall. Ohio State then drove down to the Akron 25, but turned it over on downs after an incompletion from Howard to Emeka Egbuka. Two plays later, Ohio State would get the ball back after an interception of Finley by Denzel Burke. The Buckeyes would cash in the short field with a 40–yard field goal by Jayden Fielding to increase their lead to 10–3. Akron went three-and-out again on their next drive after a third-down sack of Finley by JT Tuimoloau. Ohio State would subsequently orchestrate another touchdown drive, with Howard completing a 16-yard pass to Carnell Tate to convert third-and-8 before throwing a 9-yard touchdown pass to Smith to extend the lead to 17–3. Akron's next drive reached Ohio State territory, but stalled out at the 34 after Finley ran out of bounds on fourth-and-5. The half ended with Ohio State holding a 17–3 lead.

Akron held the ball for over six minutes of game clock on their first drive of the second half, but eventually punted. On Ohio State's second play of their next drive, Howard connected with Smith on a 45-yard deep pass, before Quinshon Judkins plunged in for a 2-yard touchdown run, his first as a Buckeye, extending Ohio State's lead to 24–3. On Akron's next drive, junior Caden Curry forced a Bullock fumble on a hit from behind, which was recovered by safety Lathan Ransom and returned for a touchdown, giving Ohio State a 31–3 lead. Akron's next drive was successful, getting inside the Ohio State 30 before Smith hit his second field goal of the day, this one a 49-yarder to trim the deficit to 31–6. Ohio State scored another touchdown on their next drive via a 4-yard run by James Peoples, extending their lead to 38–6. After forcing another punt, the Buckeyes would score again on a 34-yard touchdown pass from Howard to Tate, increasing the lead to 45–6. After a trade of punts, Ohio State would score for the final time on a pick-six by junior linebacker Gabe Powers, placing the final score at 52–6.

Statistics	AKR	OSU
First downs	11	24
Plays–yards	64–177	64–404
Rushes–yards	35–47	33–170
Passing yards	130	234
Passing: comp–att–int	18–29–2	18–31–0
Time of possession	34:03	25:57

Team	Category	Player	Statistics
Akron	Passing	Tahj Bullock	9/13, 68 yards
Akron	Rushing	Tahj Bullock	14 carries, 42 yards
Akron	Receiving	Jake Newell	2 receptions, 41 yards
Ohio State	Passing	Will Howard	17/28, 228 yards, 3 TD
Ohio State	Rushing	TreVeyon Henderson	8 carries, 65 yards
Ohio State	Receiving	Jeremiah Smith	6 receptions, 92 yards, 2 TD

=== vs Western Michigan ===
Western Michigan Broncos (0–1) vs No. 2 Ohio State Buckeyes (1–0) – Game summary

Quarter	1	2	3	4	Total
Broncos	0	0	0	0	0
No. 2 Buckeyes	21	14	14	7	56

at Ohio Stadium • Columbus, Ohio

- Date: September 7
- Game time: 7:30 p.m. EDT
- Game weather: Clear • Temperature: 64 °F (18 °C) • Wind: NW at 11 miles per hour (18 km/h)
- Game attendance: 102,665
- Referee: Jeffrey Servinski
- TV announcers (BTN): Jeff Levering (play-by-play), Jake Butt (analyst), and Brooke Fletcher (sideline reporter)
- Box score, Recap

Game information

First quarter

- (11:04) OSU – TreVeyon Henderson 3-yard run, Jayden Fielding kick (Drive: 6 plays, 55 yards, 2:35; Ohio State 7–0)
- (4:00) OSU – Jeremiah Smith 70-yard pass from Will Howard, Jayden Fielding kick (Drive: 4 plays, 75 yards, 2:28; Ohio State 14–0)
- (1:02) OSU – Quinshon Judkins 23-yard run, Jayden Fielding kick (Drive: 5 plays, 73 yards, 1:39; Ohio State 21–0)

Second quarter

- (8:28) OSU – Quinshon Judkins 23-yard run, Jayden Fielding kick (Drive: 4 plays, 65 yards, 1:17; Ohio State 28–0)
- (4:20) OSU – Will Howard 6-yard run, Jayden Fielding kick (Drive: 6 plays, 70 yards, 2:34; Ohio State 35–0)

Third quarter

- (6:44) OSU – TreVeyon Henderson 16-yard run, Jayden Fielding kick (Drive: 6 plays, 40 yards, 3:15; Ohio State 42–0)
- (0:05) OSU – James Peoples 12-yard run, Jayden Fielding kick (Drive: 8 plays, 81 yards, 4:13; Ohio State 49–0)

Fourth quarter

- (5:01) OSU – Bennett Christian 55-yard pass from Julian Sayin, Austin Snyder kick (Drive: 4 plays, 64 yards, 2:05; Ohio State 56–0)

Statistics	WMU	OSU
First downs	6	30
Plays–yards	48–99	72–683
Rushes–yards	31–28	39–273
Passing yards	71	410
Passing: comp–att–int	8–17–0	25–33–0
Time of possession	25:24	34:36

Team	Category	Player	Statistics
Western Michigan	Passing	Hayden Wolff	8/15, 71 yards
Western Michigan	Rushing	Keshawn King	8 carries, 22 yards
Western Michigan	Receiving	Anthony Sambucci	3 receptions, 41 yards
Ohio State	Passing	Will Howard	18/26, 292 yards, 1 TD
Ohio State	Rushing	Quinshon Judkins	9 carries, 108 yards, 2 TD
Ohio State	Receiving	Jeremiah Smith	5 receptions, 119 yards, 1 TD

=== vs Marshall ===
Marshall Thundering Herd (1–1) vs No. 3 Ohio State Buckeyes (2–0) – Game summary

Quarter	1	2	3	4	Total
Thundering Herd	7	7	0	0	14
No. 3 Buckeyes	7	21	14	7	49

at Ohio Stadium • Columbus, Ohio

- Date: September 21
- Game time: 12:00 p.m. EDT
- Game weather: Sunny • Temperature: 85 °F (29 °C) • Wind: W at 5 miles per hour (8.0 km/h)
- Game attendance: 103,871
- Referee: Bryan Banks
- TV announcers (FOX): Gus Johnson (play-by-play), Joel Klatt (analyst), and Jenny Taft (sideline reporter)
- Box score, Recap

Game information

First quarter

- (8:14) MRSH – Ethan Payne 1-yard run, Rece Verhoff kick (Drive: 13 plays, 75 yards, 6:46; Marshall 7–0)
- (7:32) OSU – Emeka Egbuka 68-yard pass from Will Howard, Jayden Fielding kick (Drive: 2 plays, 70 yards, 0:42; Tied 7–7)

Second quarter

- (12:31) OSU – Will Howard 1-yard run, Jayden Fielding kick (Drive: 6 plays, 45 yards, 2:26; Ohio State 14–7)
- (10:50) OSU – Quinshon Judkins 86-yard run, Jayden Fielding kick (Drive: 1 play, 86 yards, 0:12; Ohio State 21–7)
- (3:33) OSU – TreVeyon Henderson 14-yard run, Jayden Fielding kick (Drive: 7 plays, 80 yards, 3:30; Ohio State 28–7)
- (0:06) MRSH – Elijah Metcalf 13-yard pass from Stone Earle, Rece Verhoff kick (Drive: 9 plays, 65 yards, 3:27; Ohio State 28–14)

Third quarter

- (11:48) OSU – TreVeyon Henderson 40-yard run, Jayden Fielding kick (Drive: 6 plays, 75 yards, 3:12; Ohio State 35–14)
- (3:31) OSU – Jeremiah Smith 53-yard pass from Will Howard, Austin Snyder kick (Drive: 1 play, 53 yards, 0:09; Ohio State 42–14)

Fourth quarter

- (13:46) OSU – Quinshon Judkins 6-yard run, Austin Snyder kick (Drive: 9 plays, 83 yards, 3:15; Ohio State 49–14)

Statistics	MRSH	OSU
First downs	18	23
Plays–yards	70–264	57–569
Rushes–yards	43–125	31–280
Passing yards	139	289
Passing: comp–att–int	18–27–0	18–26–1
Time of possession	36:15	23:45

Team	Category	Player	Statistics
Marshall	Passing	Stone Earle	16/21, 132 yards, 1 TD
Marshall	Rushing	A. J. Turner	7 carries, 32 yards
Marshall	Receiving	Elijah Metcalf	8 receptions, 68 yards, 1 TD
Ohio State	Passing	Will Howard	16/20, 275 yards, 2 TD, 1 INT
Ohio State	Rushing	Quinshon Judkins	14 carries, 173 yards, 2 TD
Ohio State	Receiving	Emeka Egbuka	5 receptions, 117 yards, 1 TD

=== at Michigan State ===
No. 3 Ohio State Buckeyes (3–0) at Michigan State Spartans (3–1) – Game summary

Quarter	1	2	3	4	Total
No. 3 Buckeyes	3	21	14	0	38
Spartans	0	7	0	0	7

at Spartan Stadium • East Lansing, Michigan

- Date: September 28
- Game time: 7:30 p.m. EDT
- Game weather: Cloudy • Temperature: 67 °F (19 °C) • Wind: NE at 9 miles per hour (14 km/h)
- Game attendance: 71,114
- Referee: Kole Knueppel
- TV announcers (Peacock): Andrew Siciliano (play-by-play), Colt McCoy (analyst), and Lewis Johnson (sideline reporter)
- Box score, Recap

Game information

First quarter

- (9:15) OSU – Jayden Fielding 30-yard field goal (Drive: 11 plays, 63 yards, 5:45; Ohio State 3–0)

Second quarter

- (14:04) OSU – Gee Scott Jr. 3-yard pass from Will Howard, Jayden Fielding kick (Drive: 14 plays, 80 yards, 6:08; Ohio State 10–0)
- (9:41) MSU – Jaron Glover 12-yard pass from Aidan Chiles, Jonathan Kim kick (Drive: 1 play, 12 yards, 0:07; Ohio State 10–7)
- (7:22) OSU – Jeremiah Smith 19-yard run, Jayden Fielding kick (Drive: 4 plays, 75 yards, 2:19; Ohio State 17–7)
- (0:29) OSU – Jeremiah Smith 17-yard pass from Devin Brown, Jayden Fielding kick (Drive: 6 plays, 60 yards, 0:44; Ohio State 24–7)

Third quarter

- (4:57) OSU – Emeka Egbuka 33-yard pass from Will Howard, Jayden Fielding kick (Drive: 13 plays, 76 yards, 7:11; Ohio State 31–7)
- (2:05) OSU – Will Howard 6-yard run, Jayden Fielding kick (Drive: 3 plays, 12 yards, 1:19; Ohio State 38–7)

Fourth quarter

- No scoring plays

Statistics	OSU	MSU
First downs	23	13
Plays–yards	75–483	51–246
Rushes–yards	35–185	26–47
Passing yards	289	199
Passing: comp–att–int	26–40–1	16–25–1
Time of possession	35:43	24:17

Team	Category	Player	Statistics
Ohio State	Passing	Will Howard	21/31, 244 yards, 2 TD, 1 INT
Ohio State	Rushing	TreVeyon Henderson	7 carries, 69 yards
Ohio State	Receiving	Emeka Egbuka	7 receptions, 96 yards, 1 TD
Michigan State	Passing	Aidan Chiles	13/19, 167 yards, 1 TD, 1 INT
Michigan State	Rushing	Kay'Ron Lynch-Adams	9 carries, 35 yards
Michigan State	Receiving	Jaron Glover	4 receptions, 53 yards, 1 TD

=== vs Iowa ===
Iowa Hawkeyes (3–1) vs No. 3 Ohio State Buckeyes (4–0) – Game summary

Quarter	1	2	3	4	Total
Hawkeyes	0	0	0	7	7
No. 3 Buckeyes	7	0	21	7	35

at Ohio Stadium • Columbus, Ohio

- Date: October 5
- Game time: 3:30 p.m. EDT
- Game weather: Sunny • Temperature: 76 °F (24 °C) • Wind: NE at 8 miles per hour (13 km/h)
- Game attendance: 105,135
- Referee: Jeffrey Servinski
- TV announcers (CBS): Brad Nessler (play-by-play), Gary Danielson (analyst), and Jenny Dell (sideline reporter)
- Box score, Recap

Game information

First quarter

- (3:41) OSU – Emeka Egbuka 14-yard pass from Will Howard, Jayden Fielding kick (Drive: 14 plays, 88 yards, 7:36; Ohio State 7–0)

Second quarter

- No scoring plays

Third quarter

- (9:34) OSU – Jeremiah Smith 4-yard pass from Will Howard, Jayden Fielding kick (Drive: 9 plays, 86 yards, 5:17; Ohio State 14–0)
- (7:59) OSU – Will Howard 4-yard run, Jayden Fielding kick (Drive: 3 plays, 19 yards, 1:22; Ohio State 21–0)
- (0:13) OSU – Emeka Egbuka 15-yard pass from Will Howard, Jayden Fielding kick (Drive: 6 plays, 40 yards, 3:40; Ohio State 28–0)

Fourth quarter

- (10:58) OSU – Emeka Egbuka 3-yard pass from Will Howard, Jayden Fielding kick (Drive: 7 plays, 27 yards, 3:54; Ohio State 35–0)
- (8:07) IOWA – Kaleb Johnson 28-yard run, Drew Stevens kick (Drive: 5 plays, 75 yards, 2:51; Ohio State 35–7)

Statistics	IOWA	OSU
First downs	10	21
Plays–yards	48–226	65–412
Rushes–yards	26–116	39–203
Passing yards	110	209
Passing: comp–att–int	15–21–1	21–25–1
Time of possession	25:14	34:46

Team	Category	Player	Statistics
Iowa	Passing	Cade McNamara	14/20, 98 yards, 1 INT
Iowa	Rushing	Kaleb Johnson	15 carries, 86 yards, 1 TD
Iowa	Receiving	Luke Lachey	5 receptions, 39 yards
Ohio State	Passing	Will Howard	21/25, 209 yards, 4 TD, 1 INT
Ohio State	Rushing	Quinshon Judkins	13 carries, 78 yards
Ohio State	Receiving	Jeremiah Smith	4 receptions, 89 yards, 1 TD

=== at No. 3 Oregon ===
No. 2 Ohio State Buckeyes (5–0) at No. 3 Oregon Ducks (5–0) – Game summary

Quarter	1	2	3	4	Total
No. 2 Buckeyes	7	14	7	3	31
No. 3 Ducks	6	16	0	10	32

at Autzen Stadium • Eugene, Oregon

- Date: October 12
- Game time: 7:30 p.m. EDT
- Game weather: Sunny • Temperature: 77 °F (25 °C) • Wind: NW at 3 miles per hour (4.8 km/h)
- Game attendance: 60,129
- Referee: Larry Smith
- TV announcers (NBC): Noah Eagle (play-by-play), Todd Blackledge (analyst), Kathryn Tappen (sideline reporter), and Paul Burmeister (sideline reporter)
- Box score, Recap

Game information

First quarter

- (10:00) OSU – Will Howard 1-yard run, Jayden Fielding kick (Drive: 10 plays, 75 yards, 5:00; Ohio State 7–0)
- (5:51) ORE – Jordan James 3-yard run, two-point pass failed (Drive: 2 plays, 28 yards, 0:43; Ohio State 7–6)

Second quarter

- (14:22) OSU – Quinshon Judkins 1-yard run, Jayden Fielding kick (Drive: 4 plays, 74 yards, 1:21; Ohio State 14–6)
- (12:31) ORE – Evan Stewart 10-yard pass from Dillon Gabriel, two-point run failed (Drive: 4 plays, 75 yards, 1:51; Ohio State 14–12)
- (10:09) ORE – Atticus Sappington 27-yard field goal (Drive: 5 plays, 32 yards, 2:17; Oregon 15–14)
- (3:53) OSU – Emeka Egbuka 15-yard pass from Will Howard, Jayden Fielding kick (Drive: 12 plays, 75 yards, 6:16; Ohio State 21–15)
- (1:17) ORE – Tez Johnson 48-yard pass from Dillon Gabriel, Atticus Sappington kick (Drive: 7 plays, 75 yards, 2:36; Oregon 22–21)

Third quarter

- (9:27) OSU – Jeremiah Smith 6-yard pass from Will Howard, Jayden Fielding kick (Drive: 6 plays, 79 yards, 3:08; Ohio State 28–22)

Fourth quarter

- (13:20) ORE – Dillon Gabriel 27-yard run, Andrew Boyle kick (Drive: 5 plays, 60 yards, 1:51; Oregon 29–28)
- (6:00) OSU – Jayden Fielding 40-yard field goal (Drive: 13 plays, 53 yards, 7:20; Ohio State 31–29)
- (1:47) ORE – Atticus Sappington 19-yard field goal (Drive: 11 plays, 74 yards, 4:13; Oregon 32–31)

Statistics	OSU	ORE
First downs	22	18
Plays–yards	68–467	65–496
Rushes–yards	32–141	31–155
Passing yards	326	341
Passing: comp–att–int	28–35–0	23–34–0
Time of possession	33:09	26:51

Team	Category	Player	Statistics
Ohio State	Passing	Will Howard	28/35, 326 yards, 2 TD
Ohio State	Rushing	TreVeyon Henderson	10 carries, 87 yards
Ohio State	Receiving	Jeremiah Smith	9 receptions, 100 yards, 1 TD
Oregon	Passing	Dillon Gabriel	23/34, 341 yards, 2 TD
Oregon	Rushing	Jordan James	23 carries, 115 yards, 1 TD
Oregon	Receiving	Evan Stewart	7 receptions, 149 yards, 1 TD

=== vs Nebraska ===
Nebraska Cornhuskers (5–2) vs No. 4 Ohio State Buckeyes (5–1) – Game summary

Quarter	1	2	3	4	Total
Cornhuskers	0	6	3	8	17
No. 4 Buckeyes	7	7	0	7	21

at Ohio Stadium • Columbus, Ohio

- Date: October 26
- Game time: 12:00 p.m. EDT
- Game weather: Clear • Temperature: 56 °F (13 °C) • Wind: N at 7 miles per hour (11 km/h)
- Game attendance: 104,830
- Referee: Jeffrey Servinski
- TV announcers (FOX): Gus Johnson (play-by-play), Joel Klatt (analyst), and Jenny Taft (sideline reporter)
- Box score, Recap

Game information

First quarter

- (0:29) OSU – Carnell Tate 40-yard pass from Will Howard, Jayden Fielding kick (Drive: 6 plays, 91 yards, 3:02; Ohio State 7–0)

Second quarter

- (10:21) NEB – John Hohl 39-yard field goal (Drive: 10 plays, 54 yards, 5:08; Ohio State 7–3)
- (8:21) OSU – Jeremiah Smith 60-yard pass from Will Howard, Jayden Fielding kick (Drive: 4 plays, 75 yards, 2:00; Ohio State 14–3)
- (0:00) NEB – John Hohl 54-yard field goal (Drive: 8 plays, 40 yards, 2:02; Ohio State 14–6)

Third quarter

- (7:29) NEB – John Hohl 47-yard field goal (Drive: 12 plays, 58 yards, 5:51; Ohio State 14–9)

Fourth quarter

- (10:47) NEB – Dante Dowdell 1-yard run, Nate Boerkircher pass from Dylan Raiola (Drive: 9 plays, 74 yards, 4:06; Nebraska 17–14)
- (6:04) OSU – Quinshon Judkins 9-yard pass from Will Howard, Jayden Fielding kick (Drive: 8 plays, 75 yards, 4:43; Ohio State 21–17)

Statistics	NEB	OSU
First downs	18	11
Plays–yards	66–273	47–285
Rushes–yards	33–121	28–64
Passing yards	152	221
Passing: comp–att–int	21–32–1	13–16–1
Time of possession	35:07	24:53

Team	Category	Player	Statistics
Nebraska	Passing	Dylan Raiola	21/32, 152 yards, 1 INT
Nebraska	Rushing	Dante Dowdell	14 carries, 60 yards, 1 TD
Nebraska	Receiving	Thomas Fidone	4 receptions, 55 yards
Ohio State	Passing	Will Howard	13/16, 221 yards, 3 TD, 1 INT
Ohio State	Rushing	Quinshon Judkins	10 carries, 29 yards
Ohio State	Receiving	Carnell Tate	4 receptions, 102 yards, 1 TD

=== at No. 3 Penn State (rivalry) ===
No. 4 Ohio State Buckeyes (6–1) at No. 3 Penn State Nittany Lions (7–0) – Game summary

Quarter	1	2	3	4	Total
No. 4 Buckeyes	7	7	3	3	20
No. 3 Nittany Lions	10	0	3	0	13

at Beaver Stadium • University Park, Pennsylvania

- Date: November 2
- Game time: 12:00 p.m. EDT
- Game weather: Sunny • Temperature: 52 °F (11 °C) • Wind: NW at 8 miles per hour (13 km/h)
- Game attendance: 111,030
- Referee: Kole Knueppel
- TV announcers (FOX): Gus Johnson (play-by-play), Joel Klatt (analyst), and Jenny Taft (sideline reporter)
- Box score, Recap

Game information

First quarter

- (6:54) PSU – Ryan Barker 29-yard field goal (Drive: 14 plays, 61 yards, 8:00; Penn State 3–0)
- (5:37) PSU – Zion Tracy 31-yard interception return, Ryan Barker kick (Penn State 10–0)
- (1:59) OSU – Emeka Egbuka 25-yard pass from Will Howard, Jayden Fielding kick (Drive: 7 plays, 74 yards, 3:32; Penn State 10–7)

Second quarter

- (11:54) OSU – Brandon Inniss 21-yard pass from Will Howard, Jayden Fielding kick (Drive: 10 plays, 81 yards, 3:42; Ohio State 14–10)

Third quarter

- (10:40) OSU – Jayden Fielding 46-yard field goal (Drive: 8 plays, 47 yards, 4:20; Ohio State 17–10)
- (5:03) PSU – Ryan Barker 44-yard field goal (Drive: 9 plays, 49 yards, 5:32; Ohio State 17–13)

Fourth quarter

- (10:13) OSU – Jayden Fielding 39-yard field goal (Drive: 12 plays, 64 yards, 5:02; Ohio State 20–13)

Statistics	OSU	PSU
First downs	22	15
Plays–yards	64–358	53–270
Rushes–yards	38–176	32–120
Passing yards	182	150
Passing: comp–att–int	16–24–1	13–21–1
Time of possession	31:22	28:38

Team	Category	Player	Statistics
Ohio State	Passing	Will Howard	16/24, 182 yards, 2 TD, 1 INT
Ohio State	Rushing	Quinshon Judkins	14 carries, 95 yards
Ohio State	Receiving	Jeremiah Smith	4 receptions, 55 yards
Penn State	Passing	Drew Allar	12/20, 146 yards, 1 INT
Penn State	Rushing	Tyler Warren	3 carries, 47 yards
Penn State	Receiving	Nicholas Singleton	6 receptions, 54 yards

=== vs Purdue ===
Purdue Boilermakers (1–7) vs No. 2 Ohio State Buckeyes (7–1) – Game summary

Quarter	1	2	3	4	Total
Boilermakers	0	0	0	0	0
No. 2 Buckeyes	7	14	17	7	45

at Ohio Stadium • Columbus, Ohio

- Date: November 9
- Game time: 12:00 p.m. EST
- Game weather: Cloudy • Temperature: 56 °F (13 °C) • Wind: NE at 12 miles per hour (19 km/h)
- Game attendance: 103,463
- Referee: Chris Coyte
- TV announcers (FOX): Gus Johnson (play-by-play), Joel Klatt (analyst), and Jenny Taft (sideline reporter)
- Box score, Recap

Game information

First quarter

- (6:02) OSU – Will Howard 1-yard run, Jayden Fielding kick (Drive: 4 plays, 8 yards, 1:59; Ohio State 7–0)

Second quarter

- (8:30) OSU – Gee Scott Jr. 15-yard pass from Will Howard, Jayden Fielding kick (Drive: 13 plays, 80 yards, 6:42; Ohio State 14–0)
- (0:27) OSU – Jeremiah Smith 17-yard pass from Will Howard, Jayden Fielding kick (Drive: 7 plays, 59 yards, 1:13; Ohio State 21–0)

Third quarter

- (8:34) OSU – Jayden Fielding 42 yard field goal (Drive: 13 plays, 59 yards, 6:21; Ohio State 24–0)
- (3:07) OSU – TreVeyon Henderson 19-yard run, Jayden Fielding kick (Drive: 5 plays, 76 yards, 2:36; Ohio State 31–0)
- (2:59) OSU – Jack Sawyer 11-yard fumble return, Jayden Fielding kick (Ohio State 38–0)

Fourth quarter

- (14:05) OSU – Emeka Egbuka 10-yard pass from Will Howard, Jayden Fielding kick (Drive: 6 plays, 74 yards, 2:58; Ohio State 45–0)

Statistics	PUR	OSU
First downs	15	23
Plays–yards	59–206	66–433
Rushes–yards	38–98	35–173
Passing yards	108	260
Passing: comp–att–int	9–21–1	21–31–0
Time of possession	29:11	30:49

Team	Category	Player	Statistics
Purdue	Passing	Hudson Card	9/19, 108 yards, 1 INT
Purdue	Rushing	Devin Mockobee	13 carries, 73 yards
Purdue	Receiving	Shamar Rigby	1 reception, 29 yards
Ohio State	Passing	Will Howard	21/26, 260 yards, 3 TD
Ohio State	Rushing	TreVeyon Henderson	6 carries, 85 yards, 1 TD
Ohio State	Receiving	Jeremiah Smith	6 receptions, 87 yards, 1 TD

=== at Northwestern ===
No. 2 Ohio State Buckeyes (8–1) at Northwestern Wildcats (4–5) – Game summary

Quarter	1	2	3	4	Total
No. 2 Buckeyes	0	21	10	0	31
Wildcats	0	7	0	0	7

at Wrigley Field • Chicago, Illinois

- Date: November 16
- Game time: 12:00 p.m. EST
- Game weather: Sunny • Temperature: 52 °F (11 °C) • Wind: S at 11 miles per hour (18 km/h)
- Game attendance: 38,147
- Referee: Mark Kluczynski
- TV announcers (BTN): Jeff Levering (play-by-play), Jake Butt (analyst), and Brooke Fletcher (sideline reporter)
- Box score, Recap

Game information

First quarter

- No scoring plays

Second quarter

- (12:34) NU – Jack Lausch 8-yard run, Luke Akers kick (Drive: 13 plays, 92 yards, 5:30; Northwestern 7–0)
- (6:59) OSU – Quinshon Judkins 1-yard run, Jayden Fielding kick (Drive: 12 plays, 85 yards, 5:29; Tied 7–7)
- (4:19) OSU – Quinshon Judkins 1-yard run, Jayden Fielding kick (Drive: 2 plays, 1 yard, 0:56; Ohio State 14–7)
- (0:47) OSU – Carnell Tate 25-yard pass from Will Howard, Jayden Fielding kick (Drive: 6 plays, 77 yards, 1:57; Ohio State 21–7)

Third quarter

- (12:11) OSU – Carnell Tate 8-yard pass from Will Howard, Jayden Fielding kick (Drive: 5 plays, 90 yards, 2:44; Ohio State 28–7)
- (0:44) OSU – Jayden Fielding 28-yard field goal (Drive: 9 plays, 69 yards, 4:14; Ohio State 31–7)

Fourth quarter

- No scoring plays

Statistics	OSU	NU
First downs	19	17
Plays–yards	57–420	66–251
Rushes–yards	33–173	28–50
Passing yards	247	201
Passing: comp–att–int	15–24–0	21–36–0
Time of possession	28:00	32:00

Team	Category	Player	Statistics
Ohio State	Passing	Will Howard	15/24, 247 yards, 2 TD
Ohio State	Rushing	Quinshon Judkins	15 carries, 76 yards, 2 TD
Ohio State	Receiving	Jeremiah Smith	4 receptions, 100 yards
Northwestern	Passing	Jack Lausch	21/35, 201 yards
Northwestern	Rushing	Cam Porter	10 carries, 37 yards
Northwestern	Receiving	Bryce Kirtz	7 receptions, 92 yards

=== vs No. 5 Indiana ===
No. 5 Indiana Hoosiers (10–0) vs No. 2 Ohio State Buckeyes (9–1) – Game summary

Quarter	1	2	3	4	Total
No. 5 Hoosiers	7	0	0	8	15
No. 2 Buckeyes	0	14	14	10	38

at Ohio Stadium • Columbus, Ohio

- Date: November 23
- Game time: 12:00 p.m. EST
- Game weather: Cloudy • Temperature: 46 °F (8 °C) • Wind: NW at 12 miles per hour (19 km/h)
- Game attendance: 105,751
- Referee: Jerry McGinn
- TV announcers (FOX): Gus Johnson (play-by-play), Joel Klatt (analyst), and Jenny Taft (sideline reporter)
- Box score, Recap

Game information

First quarter

- (6:52) IU – Ty Son Lawton 2-yard run, Nicolas Radicic kick (Drive: 11 plays, 70 yards, 6:12; Indiana 7–0)

Second quarter

- (7:22) OSU – Emeka Egbuka 11-yard pass from Will Howard, Jayden Fielding kick (Drive: 5 plays, 44 yards, 2:20; Tied 7–7)
- (0:21) OSU – TreVeyon Henderson 4-yard run, Jayden Fielding kick (Drive: 3 plays, 7 yards, 1:20; Ohio State 14–7)

Third quarter

- (12:44) OSU – Caleb Downs 79-yard punt return, Jayden Fielding kick (Ohio State 21–7)
- (6:02) OSU – Jelani Thurman 1-yard pass from Will Howard, Jayden Fielding kick (Drive: 10 plays, 75 yards, 5:45; Ohio State 28–7)

Fourth quarter

- (8:56) OSU – Jayden Fielding 45-yard field goal (Drive: 11 plays, 43 yards, 5:51; Ohio State 31–7)
- (1:53) IU – Ty Son Lawton 2-yard run, Omar Cooper Jr. pass from Kurtis Rourke (Drive: 15 plays, 75 yards, 7:03; Ohio State 31–15)
- (0:35) OSU – Will Howard 1-yard run, Jayden Fielding kick (Drive: 3 plays, 40 yards, 1:18; Ohio State 38–15)

Statistics	IU	OSU
First downs	16	14
Plays–yards	59–151	55–316
Rushes–yards	40–86	29–115
Passing yards	68	201
Passing: comp–att–int	8–18–0	22–26–1
Time of possession	30:40	29:20

Team	Category	Player	Statistics
Indiana	Passing	Kurtis Rourke	8/18, 68 yards
Indiana	Rushing	Ty Son Lawton	15 carries, 79 yards, 2 TD
Indiana	Receiving	Elijah Sarratt	3 receptions, 40 yards
Ohio State	Passing	Will Howard	22/26, 201 yards, 2 TD, 1 INT
Ohio State	Rushing	TreVeyon Henderson	9 carries, 68 yards, 1 TD
Ohio State	Receiving	Emeka Egbuka	7 receptions, 80 yards, 1 TD

=== vs Michigan (rivalry) ===
Michigan Wolverines (6–5) vs No. 2 Ohio State Buckeyes (10–1) – Game summary

Quarter	1	2	3	4	Total
Wolverines	0	10	0	3	13
No. 2 Buckeyes	3	7	0	0	10

at Ohio Stadium • Columbus, Ohio

- Date: November 30
- Game time: 12:00 p.m. EST
- Game weather: Sunny • Temperature: 27 °F (−3 °C) • Wind: W at 11 miles per hour (18 km/h)
- Game attendance: 106,005
- Referee: Larry Smith
- TV announcers (FOX): Gus Johnson (play-by-play), Joel Klatt (analyst), Jenny Taft (sideline reporter), and Tom Rinaldi (sideline reporter)
- Box score, Recap

Game information

First quarter

- (6:14) OSU – Jayden Fielding 29-yard field goal (Drive: 9 plays, 58 yards, 4:19; Ohio State 3–0)

Second quarter

- (12:37) MICH – Kalel Mullings 1-yard run, Dominic Zvada kick (Drive: 2 plays, 2 yards, 0:44; Michigan 7–3)
- (2:15) MICH – Dominic Zvada 54-yard field goal (Drive: 4 plays, 3 yards, 2:02; Michigan 10–3)
- (0:30) OSU – Jeremiah Smith 10-yard pass from Will Howard, Jayden Fielding kick (Drive: 9 plays, 75 yards, 1:45; Tied 10–10)

Third quarter

- No scoring plays

Fourth quarter

- (0:45) MICH – Dominic Zvada 21-yard field goal (Drive: 11 plays, 57 yards, 5:28; Michigan 13–10)

Statistics	MICH	OSU
First downs	13	15
Plays–yards	58–234	59–252
Rushes–yards	41–172	26–77
Passing yards	62	175
Passing: comp–att–int	9–16–2	19–33–2
Time of possession	33:35	26:25

Team	Category	Player	Statistics
Michigan	Passing	Davis Warren	9/16, 62 yards, 2 INT
Michigan	Rushing	Kalel Mullings	32 carries, 116 yards, 1 TD
Michigan	Receiving	Peyton O'Leary	1 reception, 18 yards
Ohio State	Passing	Will Howard	19/33, 175 yards, 1 TD, 2 INT
Ohio State	Rushing	Quinshon Judkins	12 carries, 46 yards
Ohio State	Receiving	Carnell Tate	6 receptions, 58 yards

=== vs No. 7 Tennessee (CFP First Round) ===
No. 7 Tennessee Volunteers (10–2) vs No. 6 Ohio State Buckeyes (10–2) – Game summary

Quarter	1	2	3	4	Total
No. 7 Volunteers	0	10	0	7	17
No. 6 Buckeyes	21	0	14	7	42

at Ohio Stadium • Columbus, Ohio

- Date: December 21
- Game time: 8:00 p.m. EST
- Game weather: Clear • Temperature: 25 °F (−4 °C) • Wind: NW at 6 miles per hour (9.7 km/h)
- Game attendance: 102,819
- Referee: Jerry Magallanes
- TV announcers (ESPN/ABC): Chris Fowler (play-by-play), Kirk Herbstreit (analyst), Holly Rowe (sideline reporter), and Marty Smith (sideline reporter)
- Box score, Recap

Game information

First quarter

- (12:46) OSU – Jeremiah Smith 37-yard pass from Will Howard, Jayden Fielding kick (Drive: 5 plays, 75 yards, 2:14; Ohio State 7–0)
- (8:09) OSU – Quinshon Judkins 1-yard run, Jayden Fielding kick (Drive: 5 plays, 68 yards, 2:39; Ohio State 14–0)
- (3:27) OSU – TreVeyon Henderson 29-yard run, Jayden Fielding kick (Drive: 7 plays, 58 yards, 3:22; Ohio State 21–0)

Second quarter

- (6:39) TENN – Max Gilbert 36-yard field goal (Drive: 9 plays, 62 yards, 3:23; Ohio State 21–3)
- (0:20) TENN – Nico Iamaleava 2-yard run, Max Gilbert kick (Drive: 16 plays, 79 yards, 4:03; Ohio State 21–10)

Third quarter

- (9:16) OSU – Jeremiah Smith 22-yard pass from Will Howard, Jayden Fielding kick (Drive: 6 plays, 65 yards, 3:14; Ohio State 28–10)
- (1:18) OSU – Quinshon Judkins 1-yard run, Jayden Fielding kick (Drive: 9 plays, 81 yards, 4:46; Ohio State 35–10)

Fourth quarter

- (10:53) OSU – TreVeyon Henderson 24-yard run, Jayden Fielding kick (Drive: 5 plays, 39 yards, 2:26; Ohio State 42–10)
- (1:56) TENN – Nico Iamaleava 2-yard run, Max Gilbert kick (Drive: 9 plays, 73 yards, 3:19; Ohio State 42–17)

This game marked the first time a Buckeyes game would air on ABC since 2022.

Statistics	TENN	OSU
First downs	17	24
Plays–yards	70–256	64–473
Rushes–yards	39–152	33–156
Passing yards	104	317
Passing: comp–att–int	14–31–0	25–31–1
Time of possession	27:10	32:50

Team	Category	Player	Statistics
Tennessee	Passing	Nico Iamaleava	14/31, 104 yards
Tennessee	Rushing	Peyton Lewis	10 carries, 77 yards
Tennessee	Receiving	Bru McCoy	4 receptions, 40 yards
Ohio State	Passing	Will Howard	24/29, 311 yards, 2 TD, 1 INT
Ohio State	Rushing	TreVeyon Henderson	10 carries, 80 yards, 2 TD
Ohio State	Receiving	Jeremiah Smith	6 receptions, 103 yards, 2 TD

=== vs. No. 1 Oregon (Rose Bowl / CFP Quarterfinal) ===
2025 Rose Bowl
No. 6 Ohio State Buckeyes (11–2) vs. No. 1 Oregon Ducks (13–0) – Game summary

Quarter	1	2	3	4	Total
No. 6 Buckeyes	14	20	7	0	41
No. 1 Ducks	0	8	7	6	21

at Rose Bowl • Pasadena, California

- Date: January 1, 2025
- Game time: 5:00 p.m. EST
- Game weather: Sunny • Temperature: 70 °F (21 °C) • Wind: N at 6 miles per hour (9.7 km/h)
- Game attendance: 90,732
- Referee: Adam Savoie
- TV announcers (ESPN): Chris Fowler (play-by-play), Kirk Herbstreit (analyst), Holly Rowe (sideline reporter), and Stormy Buonantony (sideline reporter)
- Box score, Recap

Game information

First quarter

- (14:00) OSU – Jeremiah Smith 45-yard pass from Will Howard, Jayden Fielding kick (Drive: 3 plays, 75 yards, 1:00; Ohio State 7–0)
- (7:31) OSU – Emeka Egbuka 42-yard pass from Will Howard, Jayden Fielding kick (Drive: 3 plays, 53 yards, 1:05; Ohio State 14–0)

Second quarter

- (14:50) OSU – Jayden Fielding 46-yard field goal (Drive: 10 plays, 63 yards, 3:53; Ohio State 17–0)
- (10:28) OSU – Jeremiah Smith 43-yard pass from Will Howard, Jayden Fielding kick (Drive: 2 plays, 48 yards, 0:43; Ohio State 24–0)
- (8:47) OSU – TreVeyon Henderson 66-yard run, Jayden Fielding kick (Drive: 1 play, 66 yards, 0:10; Ohio State 31–0)
- (2:59) OSU – Jayden Fielding 36-yard field goal (Drive: 10 plays, 43 yards, 4:50; Ohio State 34–0)
- (0:00) ORE – Traeshon Holden 5-yard pass from Dillon Gabriel, Justius Lowe pass from Dillon Gabriel (Drive: 10 plays, 75 yards, 2:59; Ohio State 34–8)

Third quarter

- (8:55) ORE – Noah Whittington 2-yard run, Atticus Sappington kick (Drive: 11 plays, 75 yards, 6:05; Ohio State 34–15)
- (2:19) OSU – TreVeyon Henderson 8-yard run, Jayden Fielding kick (Drive: 6 plays, 56 yards, 3:16; Ohio State 41–15)

Fourth quarter

- (10:00) ORE – Traeshon Holden 27-yard pass from Dillon Gabriel, two-point run failed (Drive: 10 plays, 51 yards, 3:36; Ohio State 41–21)

Statistics	OSU	ORE
First downs	20	15
Plays–yards	57–500	70–276
Rushes–yards	31–181	28– -23
Passing yards	319	299
Passing: comp–att–int	17–26–0	29–42–0
Time of possession	29:05	30:55

Team	Category	Player	Statistics
Ohio State	Passing	Will Howard	17/26, 319 yards, 3 TD
Ohio State	Rushing	TreVeyon Henderson	8 carries, 94 yards, 2 TD
Ohio State	Receiving	Jeremiah Smith	7 receptions, 187 yards, 2 TD
Oregon	Passing	Dillon Gabriel	29/41, 299 yards, 2 TD
Oregon	Rushing	Jordan James	7 carries, 14 yards
Oregon	Receiving	Traeshon Holden	7 receptions, 116 yards, 2 TD

=== vs. No. 3 Texas (Cotton Bowl Classic / CFP Semifinal) ===
2025 Cotton Bowl Classic (January)
No. 6 Ohio State Buckeyes (12–2) vs. No. 3 Texas Longhorns (13–2) – Game summary

Quarter	1	2	3	4	Total
No. 6 Buckeyes	7	7	0	14	28
No. 3 Longhorns	0	7	7	0	14

at AT&T Stadium • Arlington, Texas

- Date: January 10, 2025
- Game time: 7:30 p.m. EST
- Game weather: None (indoor stadium)
- Game attendance: 74,527
- Referee: Jerry Magallanes
- TV announcers (ESPN): Chris Fowler (play-by-play), Kirk Herbstreit (analyst), Laura Rutledge (sideline reporter), and Holly Rowe (sideline reporter)
- Box score, Recap

Game information

First quarter

- (7:24) OSU – Quinshon Judkins 9-yard run, Jayden Fielding kick (Drive: 10 plays, 64 yards, 4:18; Ohio State 7–0)

Second quarter

- (0:29) TEX – Jaydon Blue 18-yard pass from Quinn Ewers, Will Stone kick (Drive: 7 plays, 59 yards, 1:22; Tied 7–7)
- (0:13) OSU – TreVeyon Henderson 75-yard pass from Will Howard, Jayden Fielding kick (Drive: 1 play, 75 yards, 0:16; Ohio State 14–7)

Third quarter

- (3:12) TEX – Jaydon Blue 26-yard pass from Quinn Ewers, Will Stone kick (Drive: 12 plays, 67 yards, 5:18; Tied 14–14)

Fourth quarter

- (7:02) OSU – Quinshon Judkins 1-yard run, Jayden Fielding kick (Drive: 13 plays, 88 yards, 7:45; Ohio State 21–14)
- (2:13) OSU – Jack Sawyer 83-yard fumble return, Jayden Fielding kick (Ohio State 28–14)

Statistics	OSU	TEX
First downs	18	21
Plays–yards	57–370	68–341
Rushes–yards	24–81	29–58
Passing yards	289	283
Passing: comp–att–int	24–33–1	23–39–1
Time of possession	31:38	28:22

Team	Category	Player	Statistics
Ohio State	Passing	Will Howard	24/33, 289 yards, 1 TD, 1 INT
Ohio State	Rushing	TreVeyon Henderson	6 carries, 42 yards
Ohio State	Receiving	Carnell Tate	7 receptions, 87 yards
Texas	Passing	Quinn Ewers	23/39, 283 yards, 2 TD, 1 INT
Texas	Rushing	Quintrevion Wisner	17 carries, 46 yards
Texas	Receiving	Jaydon Blue	5 receptions, 59 yards, 2 TD

=== vs. No. 5 Notre Dame (CFP National Championship Game) ===
2025 College Football Playoff National Championship
No. 6 Ohio State Buckeyes (13–2) vs. No. 5 Notre Dame Fighting Irish (14–1) – Game summary

Quarter	1	2	3	4	Total
No. 6 Buckeyes	0	21	10	3	34
No. 5 Fighting Irish	7	0	8	8	23

at Mercedes-Benz Stadium • Atlanta, Georgia

- Date: January 20, 2025
- Game time: 7:30 p.m. EST
- Game weather: None (indoor stadium)
- Game attendance: 77,660
- Referee: Steve Marlowe
- TV announcers (ESPN): Chris Fowler (play-by-play), Kirk Herbstreit (analyst), Holly Rowe (sideline reporter), and Molly McGrath (sideline reporter)
- Box score, Recap

Game information

First quarter

- (5:15) ND – Riley Leonard 1-yard run, Mitch Jeter kick (Drive: 18 plays, 75 yards, 9:45; Notre Dame 7–0)

Second quarter

- (14:10) OSU – Jeremiah Smith 8-yard pass from Will Howard, Jayden Fielding kick (Drive: 11 plays, 75 yards, 6:05; Tied 7–7)
- (6:15) OSU – Quinshon Judkins 9-yard run, Jayden Fielding kick (Drive: 10 plays, 76 yards, 6:06; Ohio State 14–7)
- (0:27) OSU – Quinshon Judkins 6-yard pass from Will Howard, Jayden Fielding kick (Drive: 12 plays, 80 yards, 4:26; Ohio State 21–7)

Third quarter

- (12:46) OSU – Quinshon Judkins 1-yard run, Jayden Fielding kick (Drive: 5 plays, 75 yards, 2:14; Ohio State 28–7)
- (7:52) OSU – Jayden Fielding 46-yard field goal (Drive: 6 plays, 5 yards, 3:26; Ohio State 31–7)
- (3:03) ND – Jaden Greathouse 34-yard pass from Riley Leonard, Jeremiyah Love pass from Riley Leonard (Drive: 10 plays, 75 yards, 4:49; Ohio State 31–15)

Fourth quarter

- (4:15) ND – Jaden Greathouse 30-yard pass from Riley Leonard, Beaux Collins pass from Jordan Faison (Drive: 6 plays, 80 yards, 2:10; Ohio State 31–23)
- (0:26) OSU – Jayden Fielding 33-yard field goal (Drive: 9 plays, 61 yards, 3:44; Ohio State 34–23)

Statistics	OSU	ND
First downs	22	19
Plays–yards	62–445	58–308
Rushes–yards	41–214	26–53
Passing yards	231	255
Passing: comp–att–int	17–21–0	22–32–0
Time of possession	32:25	27:35

Team	Category	Player	Statistics
Ohio State	Passing	Will Howard	17/21, 231 yards, 2 TD
Ohio State	Rushing	Quinshon Judkins	11 carries, 100 yards, 2 TD
Ohio State	Receiving	Jeremiah Smith	5 receptions, 88 yards, 1 TD
Notre Dame	Passing	Riley Leonard	22/31, 255 yards, 2 TD
Notre Dame	Rushing	Riley Leonard	17 carries, 40 yards, 1 TD
Notre Dame	Receiving	Jaden Greathouse	6 receptions, 128 yards, 2 TD

== Personnel ==
=== Roster ===
2024 Ohio State Buckeyes football team roster
Players
Coaches
Offense

Pos.	#	Name	Class
RB	1	Quinshon Judkins	Jr
WR	2	Emeka Egbuka (C)	GS
QB	3	Lincoln Kienholz	So
WR	4	Jeremiah Smith	Fr
WR	5	Mylan Graham	Fr
WR	9	Jayden Ballard	Sr
QB	10	Julian Sayin	Fr
WR	11	Brandon Inniss	So
QB	12	Air Noland	Fr
WR	13	Bryson Rodgers	So
WR	14	Kojo Antwi	Jr
TE	15	Jelani Thurman	So
QB	16	Mason Maggs	Jr
WR	17	Carnell Tate	So
QB	18	Will Howard	GS
QB	19	Chad Ray	Sr
RB	20	James Peoples	Fr
WR	23	Nolan Baudo	So
RB	24	Sam Williams-Dixon	Fr
RB	26	Chase Brecht	Jr
RB	28	TC Caffey (injured)	Jr
RB	30	Rashid SeSay	Fr
RB	32	TreVeyon Henderson (C)	Sr
QB	33	Devin Brown	Jr
WR	34	Brennen Schramm	So
TE	46	Jace Middleton	Sr
TE	49	Patrick Gurd	Sr
OL	51	Luke Montgomery	So
OL	54	Toby Wilson	Sr
OL	56	Seth McLaughlin (injured)	GS
OL	58	Gabe VanSickle	Fr
OL	62	Joshua Padilla	So
OL	63	Julian Goines-Jackson	Jr
OL	64	Simon Lorentz	Fr
OL	65	Zen Michalski	Sr
OL	67	Austin Siereveld	So
OL	68	George Fitzpatrick	Jr
OL	69	Ian Moore	Fr
OL	70	Josh Fryar	Sr
OL	71	Josh Simmons (injured)	Sr
OL	72	Deontae Armstrong	Fr
OL	73	Devontae Armstrong	Fr
OL	74	Donovan Jackson	Sr
OL	75	Carson Hinzman	Jr
OL	76	Miles Walker	So
OL	77	Tegra Tshabola	Jr
WR	80	Shawn Lodge	Jr
WR	81	Damarion Witten	Fr
WR	82	David Adolph	Jr
WR	83	Joop Mitchell	Sr
WR	84	Dorian Williams	Fr
TE	85	Bennett Christian	Jr
TE	86	Maxence LeBlanc	Fr
WR	87	Reis Stocksdale	Sr
TE	88	Gee Scott Jr.	GS
TE	89	Zak Herbstreit	Sr
TE	89	Will Kacmarek	Sr

Defense

Pos.	#	Name	Class
LB	0	Cody Simon (C)	GS
CB	1	Davison Igbinosun	Jr
S	2	Caleb Downs	So
S	3	Lorenzo Styles Jr.	Sr
CB	5	Aaron Scott Jr.	Fr
LB	6	Sonny Styles	Jr
CB	7	Jordan Hancock	Sr
S	8	Lathan Ransom	Sr
S	9	Malik Hartford	So
CB	10	Denzel Burke	Sr
LB	11	C. J. Hicks	Jr
CB	12	Bryce West	Fr
CB	13	Miles Lockhart	Fr
DB	16	Keenan Nelson Jr.	Jr
LB	17	Mitchell Melton	Sr
S	18	Jaylen McClain	Fr
LB	20	Arvell Reese	So
S	21	Jayden Bonsu	So
CB	22	Calvin Simpson-Hunt	So
LB	23	Garrett Stover	Fr
CB	24	Jermaine Mathews Jr.	So
LB	26	Payton Pierce	Fr
S	28	Leroy Roker III	Fr
DB	29	Glorien Gough	So
S	32	Brenten "Inky" Jones	Jr
DE	33	Jack Sawyer (C)	Sr
CB	34	Buakri Miles Jr.	Fr
LB	36	Gabe Powers	Jr
LB	37	Zach Hayes	Fr
LB	38	Eli Riggs	Fr
LB	39	Joey Velazquez	GS
CB	43	Dianté Griffin	Jr
DE	44	JT Tuimoloau	Sr
S	46	Ryan Rudzinski	So
LB	50	Alec DelSignore	So
DE	52	Joshua Mickens	So
DL	53	Will Smith Jr.	So
DE	55	Dominic Kirks	Fr
LB	57	Jalen Pace	Sr
DT	58	Ty Hamilton	Sr
DL	59	Ahmed Tounkara	Fr
DL	60	Cade Casto	Sr
DL	62	Bryce Prater	Sr
LB	66	Nate Riegle	Fr
DL	90	Eric Mensah	Fr
DT	91	Tyleik Williams	Sr
DE	92	Caden Curry	Jr
DT	93	Hero Kanu	Jr
DL	94	Jason Moore	So
DT	95	Tywone Malone Jr.	Sr
DE	96	Eddrick Houston	Fr
DE	97	Kenyatta Jackson Jr.	Jr
DL	98	Kayden McDonald	So

Special teams

Pos.	#	Name	Class
P	19	Nick McLarty	Fr
P	35	Anthony Venneri	Jr
K	38	Jayden Fielding	Jr
P	39	Hadi Jawad	Sr
LS	41	Morrow Evans	Fr
P	42	Joe McGuire	So
LS	43	John Ferlmann	Sr
LS	48	Max Lomonico	Sr
K	95	Casey Magyar	Sr
LS	96	Collin Johnson	Sr
K	98	Austin Snyder	Sr

Head coach

- Ryan Day

Coordinators/assistant coaches

- Chip Kelly – Offensive coordinator/quarterbacks
- Jim Knowles – Defensive coordinator
- Keenan Bailey – Tight ends
- Justin Frye – Run game coordinator/offensive line
- Matt Guerrieri – Safeties
- Brian Hartline – Co-offensive coordinator/wide receivers
- Larry Johnson – Associate head coach/defensive line
- James Laurinaitis – Linebackers
- Carlos Locklyn – Running backs
- Tim Walton – Assistant head coach/secondary/cornerbacks
- Mickey Marotti – Associate AD/director of football sport performance
- Brent Zdebski – Quality control - defense
- Rob Keys – Quality control - kicking
- Sam McGrath – Quality control - defense
- Joe Lyberger – Quality control - defense
- Tim Drevno – Quality control - offense
- LaAllan Clark – Graduate assistant - defense
- Mike Sollenne – Graduate assistant - offense
- Sean Binckes – Graduate assistant - offense
- Michael Hunter – Graduate assistant - defense
- Riley Larkin – Program assistant - offense
- Gunner Daniel – Program assistant - special teams
- Devin Jordan – Program assistant - offense
- Gerren DuHart – Program assistant - defense
- Joshua Chorba – Program assistant - defense
- Tony Johnson – Senior advisor/analyst

Legend

- (C) Team captain
- (S) Suspended
- (I) Ineligible
- Injured
- Redshirt

Roster
Last update: July 18, 2024

=== Depth chart ===
Defense

S
7 Jordan Hancock
3 Lorenzo Styles Jr.
13 Miles Lockhart

FS
2 Caleb Downs
9 Malik Hartford
16 Keenan Nelson Jr.

WLB	SLB
6 Sonny Styles	0 Cody Simon
11 C. J. Hicks	20 Arvell Reese
26 Payton Pierce	36 Gabe Powers

SS
8 Lathan Ransom
21 Jayden Bonsu
18 Jaylen McClain

CB
1 Davison Igbinosun
24 Jermaine Mathews Jr.
12 Bryce West

DE	DT	DT	DE
44 JT Tuimoloau	91 Tyleik Williams	58 Ty Hamilton	33 Jack Sawyer
97 Kenyatta Jackson Jr.	93 Hero Kanu	98 Kayden McDonald	92 Caden Curry
96 Eddrick Houston	94 Jason Moore	95 Tywone Malone Jr.	17 Mitchell Melton

CB
10 Denzel Burke
5 Aaron Scott Jr.
22 Calvin Simpson-Hunt

Offense

WR
4 Jeremiah Smith
9 Jayden Ballard
14 Kojo Antwi

WR
2 Emeka Egbuka
11 Brandon Inniss
82 David Adolph

LT	LG	C	RG	RT
74 Donovan Jackson	67 Austin Siereveld	75 Carson Hinzman	77 Tegra Tshabola	70 Josh Fryar
65 Zen Michalski	51 Luke Montgomery	62 Joshua Padilla	54 Toby Wilson	68 George Fitzpatrick
72 Deontae Armstrong	—	—	58 Gabe VanSickle	69 Ian Moore

TE
88 Gee Scott Jr.
89 Will Kacmarek
85 Bennett Christian

WR
17 Carnell Tate
13 Bryson Rodgers
5 Mylan Graham

QB
18 Will Howard
33 Devin Brown
10 Julian Sayin

Key reserves
Out (season)
RB 28 TC Caffey (injured)
C 56 Seth McLaughlin (injured)
LT 71 Josh Simmons (injured)
QB 3 Lincoln Kienholz
QB 12 Air Noland
RB 24 Sam Williams-Dixon
TE 15 Jelani Thurman
DT 53 Will Smith Jr.
DE 52 Joshua Mickens
SLB 23 Garrett Stover

RB
1 Quinshon Judkins
32 TreVeyon Henderson
20 James Peoples

Special teams
PK 38 Jayden Fielding
PK 98 Austin Snyder
P 42 Joe McGuire
P 19 Nick McLarty
KR 9 Jayden Ballard
PR 11 Brandon Inniss
LS 43 John Ferlmann
H 42 Joe McGuire

As of January 20, 2025. Depth chart

== Statistics ==
=== Team ===
	Ohio State	Opp
Points per game	35.7	12.9
Total	571	206
First downs	332	241
Rushing	135	97
Passing	183	117
Penalty	14	27
Rushing yards	2,662	1,402
Avg per rush	5.0	2.6
Avg per game	166.4	87.6
Rushing touchdowns	34	13
Passing yards	4,208	2,672
Att-Comp-Int	455-325-10	442-267-10
Avg per pass	9.3	6.1
Avg per game	263.0	167.0
Passing touchdowns	37	10
Total offense	6,870	4,074
Avg per play	6.9	4.2
Avg per game	429.4	254.6
Fumbles-Lost	15-5	23-9
Penalties-Yards	72-653	58-467
Avg per game	40.8	29.2
Punts-Yards	49-2,042	87-3,674
Avg per punt	39.0	38.1
Time of possession/Game	30:18	29:42
3rd down conversions	81-186	80-229
4th down conversions	20-28	15-33
Sacks-Yards	53-362	16-96
Touchdowns scored	76	24
Field goals-Attempts	13-17	12-18
PAT-Attempts	76-76	16-16

=== Individual leaders ===
==== Offense ====
Passing statistics
#	NAME	POS	RAT	CMP	ATT	YDS	AVG/G	CMP%	TD	INT	LONG
18	Will Howard	QB	175.3	309	423	4,010	250.6	73.1%	35	10	75
33	Devin Brown	QB	119.4	11	20	114	12.7	55.0%	1	0	27
10	Julian Sayin	QB	128.0	5	12	84	21.0	41.7%	1	0	55

Rushing statistics
#	NAME	POS	ATT	GAIN	AVG	TD	LONG	AVG/G
1	Quinshon Judkins	RB	194	1,082	5.5	14	86	66.3
32	TreVeyon Henderson	RB	144	1,041	7.1	10	66	63.5
18	Will Howard	QB	105	367	2.2	7	19	14.1
20	James Peoples	RB	49	210	4.0	2	18	24.6
24	Sam Williams-Dixon	RB	7	53	7.6	0	31	13.3
4	Jeremiah Smith	WR	6	52	7.8	1	19	2.9
2	Emeka Egbuka	WR	8	39	4.1	0	13	2.1
10	Julian Sayin	QB	2	24	12.0	0	19	6.0
33	Devin Brown	QB	7	24	1.9	0	10	1.4
16	Mason Maggs	QB	1	3	3.0	0	3	3.0

Receiving statistics
#	NAME	POS	CTH	YDS	AVG	TD	LONG	AVG/G
4	Jeremiah Smith	WR	76	1,315	17.3	15	70	82.2
2	Emeka Egbuka	WR	81	1,011	12.5	10	68	63.2
17	Carnell Tate	WR	52	733	14.1	4	40	48.9
32	TreVeyon Henderson	RB	27	284	10.5	1	75	17.8
88	Gee Scott Jr.	TE	27	253	9.4	2	34	15.8
11	Brandon Inniss	WR	14	176	12.6	1	27	11.0
1	Quinshon Judkins	RB	22	161	7.3	2	21	10.1
89	Will Kacmarek	TE	8	86	10.8	0	32	7.2
85	Bennett Christian	TE	2	61	30.5	1	55	4.1
13	Bryson Rodgers	WR	5	46	9.2	0	12	3.8
15	Jelani Thurman	TE	4	42	10.5	1	19	3.0
9	Jayden Ballard	WR	2	18	9.0	0	12	3.0
82	David Adolph	WR	1	10	10.0	0	10	0.6
14	Kojo Antwi	WR	1	8	8.0	0	8	1.6
49	Patrick Gurd	TE	1	6	6.0	0	6	0.4
18	Will Howard	QB	1	0	0.0	0	0	0.0
20	James Peoples	RB	1	-2	-2.0	0	0	-0.3

==== Defense ====
Defense statistics
#	NAME	POS	SOLO	AST	TOT	TFL	SACK	INT	BU	QBH	FR	FF	BLK	SAF
0	Cody Simon	LB	51	61	112	12.5	7.0	0	7	0	1	1	0	0
6	Sonny Styles	LB	48	52	100	10.5	6.0	0	5	0	1	1	0	0
2	Caleb Downs	S	48	33	81	7.5	0.5	2	6	1	0	0	0	0
8	Lathan Ransom	S	46	30	76	9.0	1.0	1	2	1	3	1	0	0
44	JT Tuimoloau	DE	35	26	61	21.5	12.5	0	3	5	2	0	0	0
33	Jack Sawyer	DE	25	34	59	9.0	9.0	1	6	8	3	3	0	0
58	Ty Hamilton	DT	14	37	51	6.0	3.5	0	0	1	1	1	0	0
10	Denzel Burke	CB	37	11	48	3.0	0.0	2	2	0	0	0	0	0
7	Jordan Hancock	CB	29	19	48	1.5	0.5	1	8	1	2	0	0	0
91	Tyleik Williams	DT	16	30	46	8.0	2.5	0	1	1	0	0	0	0
1	Davison Igbinosun	CB	30	15	45	2.0	0.0	2	9	0	0	1	0	0
20	Arvell Reese	LB	18	25	43	3.5	0.5	0	0	2	0	0	0	0
92	Caden Curry	DE	15	7	22	3.5	2.5	0	0	1	2	0	1	0
11	C. J. Hicks	LB	10	12	22	2.0	2.0	0	1	1	0	0	0	0
24	Jermaine Mathews Jr.	CB	14	8	22	2.5	1.0	0	0	0	0	0	0	0

Key: POS: Position, SOLO: Solo Tackles, AST: Assisted Tackles, TOT: Total Tackles, TFL: Tackles-for-loss, SACK: Quarterback Sacks, INT: Interceptions, BU: Passes Broken Up, QBH: Quarterback Hits, FR: Fumbles Recovered, FF: Forced Fumbles, BLK: Kicks or Punts Blocked, SAF: Safeties

==== Special teams ====
Kicking statistics

Kickoff statistics
#	NAME	POS	KICKS	YDS	AVG	TB	OB

Punting statistics
#	NAME	POS	PUNTS	YDS	AVG	LONG	TB	FC	I–20	50+	BLK

Kick return statistics
#	NAME	POS	RTNS	YDS	AVG	TD	LNG

Punt return statistics
#	NAME	POS	RTNS	YDS	AVG	TD	LONG

== Awards and honors ==
=== Preseason honors ===
Big Ten Preseason Honors
#	Name	Pos	Year
2	Caleb Downs	SAF	SO
2	Emeka Egbuka	WR	GR
32	TreVeyon Henderson	RB	SR
44	JT Tuimoloau	DE	SR

=== In-season awards ===
==== Weekly Individual Awards ====
Big Ten Weekly Honors
Date	Player	Position	Award
Week 5	Jeremiah Smith	WR	Freshman of the Week
Week 6	Emeka Egbuka	WR	Offensive Player of the Week
Week 11	Will Howard	QB	Offensive Player of the Week
Week 11	Jeremiah Smith	WR	Freshman of the Week
Week 13	Will Howard	QB	co-Offensive Player of the Week
Week 13	Cody Simon	LB	Defensive Player of the Week

=== Post-season awards and honors ===
Big Ten Awards
Award	Player	Position
Richter–Howard Receiver of the Year	Jeremiah Smith	WR
Tatum–Woodson Defensive Back of the Year	Caleb Downs	SAF
Thompson–Randle El Freshman of the Year	Jeremiah Smith	WR

All-Big Ten Team
Award	Player	Position
1st Team	Jeremiah Smith	WR
1st Team	Donovan Jackson	OG
1st Team	Seth McLaughlin	C
1st Team	JT Tuimoloau	DL
1st Team	Cody Simon	LB
1st Team	Caleb Downs	DB
1st Team	Lathan Ransom	DB
2nd Team	Jack Sawyer	DL
2nd Team	Sonny Styles	LB
3rd Team	Will Howard	QB
3rd Team	TreVeyon Henderson	RB
3rd Team	Quinshon Judkins	RB
3rd Team	Emeka Egbuka	WR
3rd Team	Tyleik Williams	DL
3rd Team	Denzel Burke	CB

All-American Honors
Player	Position	Status
Seth McLaughlin	C	Consensus
Caleb Downs	DB	Unanimous
Donovan Jackson	OL	

=== CFP awards and honors ===
Game awards
Player	Position	Award	Round
Jeremiah Smith	WR	Offensive Player of the Game	Rose Bowl (Quarterfinal)
Cody Simon	LB	Defensive Player of the Game	Rose Bowl (Quarterfinal)
Will Howard	QB	Offensive Player of the Game	Cotton Bowl (Semifinal)
Jack Sawyer	DE	Defensive Player of the Game	Cotton Bowl (Semifinal)
Will Howard	QB	Offensive Player of the Game	CFP National Championship
Cody Simon	LB	Defensive Player of the Game	CFP National Championship

All-CFP Team
Player	Position	Outlet
Will Howard	QB	SI, CBS, ATH, AP
Quinshon Judkins	RB	CBS, ATH, AP
TreVeyon Henderson	RB	ATH, AP
Jeremiah Smith	WR	SI, CBS, ATH, AP
Donovan Jackson	OG	SI, CBS, ATH, AP
Carson Hinzman	C	AP
JT Tuimoloau	DE	SI, CBS, ATH, AP
Jack Sawyer	DE	SI, CBS, ATH, AP
Tyleik Williams	DT	CBS
Sonny Styles	LB	CBS, ATH, AP
Cody Simon	LB	SI, CBS, ATH, AP
Caleb Downs	S	SI, CBS, ATH, AP
Jayden Fielding	K	ATH

Sources: Sports Illustrated, CBS, The Athletic, Associated Press

==== Other awards and honors ====
===== Archie Griffin awards =====
On Saturday, August 17, a statue of Archie Griffin was revealed at Rose Bowl Stadium in Pasadena, California. On Friday, August 30, a statue of Archie Griffin was unveiled at Ohio Stadium. During the halftime show on Saturday, August 31, Archie Griffin dotted the "i".
