= C. J. Hicks =

American football player (born 2003)

No. 1 – South Florida Bulls
- Position: Defensive end
- Class: Senior

Personal information
- Born: December 1, 2003 (age 22)
- Listed height: 6 ft 3 in (1.91 m)
- Listed weight: 240 lb (109 kg)

Career information
- High school: Archbishop Alter (Kettering, Ohio)
- College: Ohio State (2022–2025); South Florida (2026–present)

Awards and highlights
- CFP national champion (2024)
- Stats at ESPN

C. J. Hicks (born December 1, 2003) is an American college football defensive end for the South Florida Bulls. He previously played for the Ohio State Buckeyes.

== Early life ==
Hicks grew up in Dayton, Ohio. He attended Archbishop Alter High School in Kettering, Ohio, where he won Ohio's Division III Defensive Player of the Year in 2021, after recording 84 tackles, 18 for loss, and 2 interceptions. During his high school career, he played multiple defensive positions, such as strong safety, or outside linebacker, and was also awarded two first-team All-Ohio selections. Coming out of high school, Hicks was rated as one of the best players in the 2022 recruiting class. He was rated a 5-star prospect by 247Sports, but most services rated him a 4-star. He received offers from Alabama, Arkansas, Clemson, Florida State, LSU, Maryland, Michigan, Michigan State, NC State, Nebraska, Ohio State, Oregon, Penn State, Tennessee, and Texas A&M, before ultimately committing to Ohio State.

== College career ==
Hicks made his college football debut during the 2022 season when Ohio State beat Arkansas State. Against Michigan in the 2022 edition of The Game, Hicks exited the game after the opening kickoff with a knee injury in the 45–23 loss. He recorded 6 tackles, 4 solo, 2 assisting in 12 games, including their Peach Bowl loss, played during his freshman season. During the 2023 season, Hicks played a career-high 71 snaps, in which 18 of the snaps he played during the Buckeyes' 38–3 win over Michigan State was also a career-high, but in a single game. He also played 4 snaps in the Buckeyes' loss to Missouri in the Cotton Bowl Classic. So far in his college career, Hicks has racked up 14 tackles, with 1 being for loss. During the 2024 season, Hicks made his first career start against Akron at will linebacker. Hicks also took snaps at weakside linebacker as well.

Heading into the 2025 season, Hicks made the switch to defensive end.
