= Rodney Shelley =

American football player (born 2002)

No. 24 – Los Angeles Chargers
- Position: Cornerback
- Roster status: Injured reserve

Personal information
- Born: August 14, 2002 (age 24); Fairburn, Georgia, U.S.
- Listed height: 5 ft 11 in (1.80 m)
- Listed weight: 180 lb (82 kg)

Career information
- High school: Langston Hughes (Fairburn, Georgia)
- College: Georgia Tech (2022–2025)
- NFL draft: 2026: undrafted

Career history
- Los Angeles Chargers (2026–present)

Career NFL statistics as of Week 5, 2026
- Total tackles: 5
- Stats at Pro Football Reference

Rodney Shelley (born August 14, 2002) is an American professional football cornerback for the Los Angeles Chargers of the National Football League (NFL). He played college football for the Georgia Tech Yellow Jackets.

== Early life ==
Shelley was born on August 14, 2002. He attended Langston Hughes High School in Fairburn, Georgia, where he played football and ran track. Shelley played defensive back and wide receiver, where as a senior, he made 48 tackles, five interceptions and four deflected passes. On offense, he had 38 receptions for 744 yards and 10 touchdowns. As a three-star recruit, he committed to play college football at Georgia Tech.

== College career ==
Shelley played college football for the Georgia Tech Yellow Jackets from 2022 to 2025. He played 45 games, starting 13, where he made 81 tackles, including seven for loss, two interceptions and eight pass deflections.

== Professional career ==
Pre-draft measurables
Height	Weight	Arm length	Hand span	Wingspan	40-yard dash	10-yard split	20-yard split	20-yard shuttle	Three-cone drill	Vertical jump	Broad jump
5 ft 10 1/2 in (1.79 m)	182 lb (83 kg)	32 1/4 in (0.82 m)	9 3/4 in (0.25 m)	6 ft 7 1/4 in (2.01 m)	4.46 s	1.48 s	2.50 s	4.25 s	6.94 s	37.0 in (0.94 m)	10 ft 9 in (3.28 m)
All values from Pro Day

After going undrafted in the 2026 NFL draft, Shelley signed with the Los Angeles Chargers as an undrafted free agent.
