= Jaylen McClain =

American football player (born 2006)

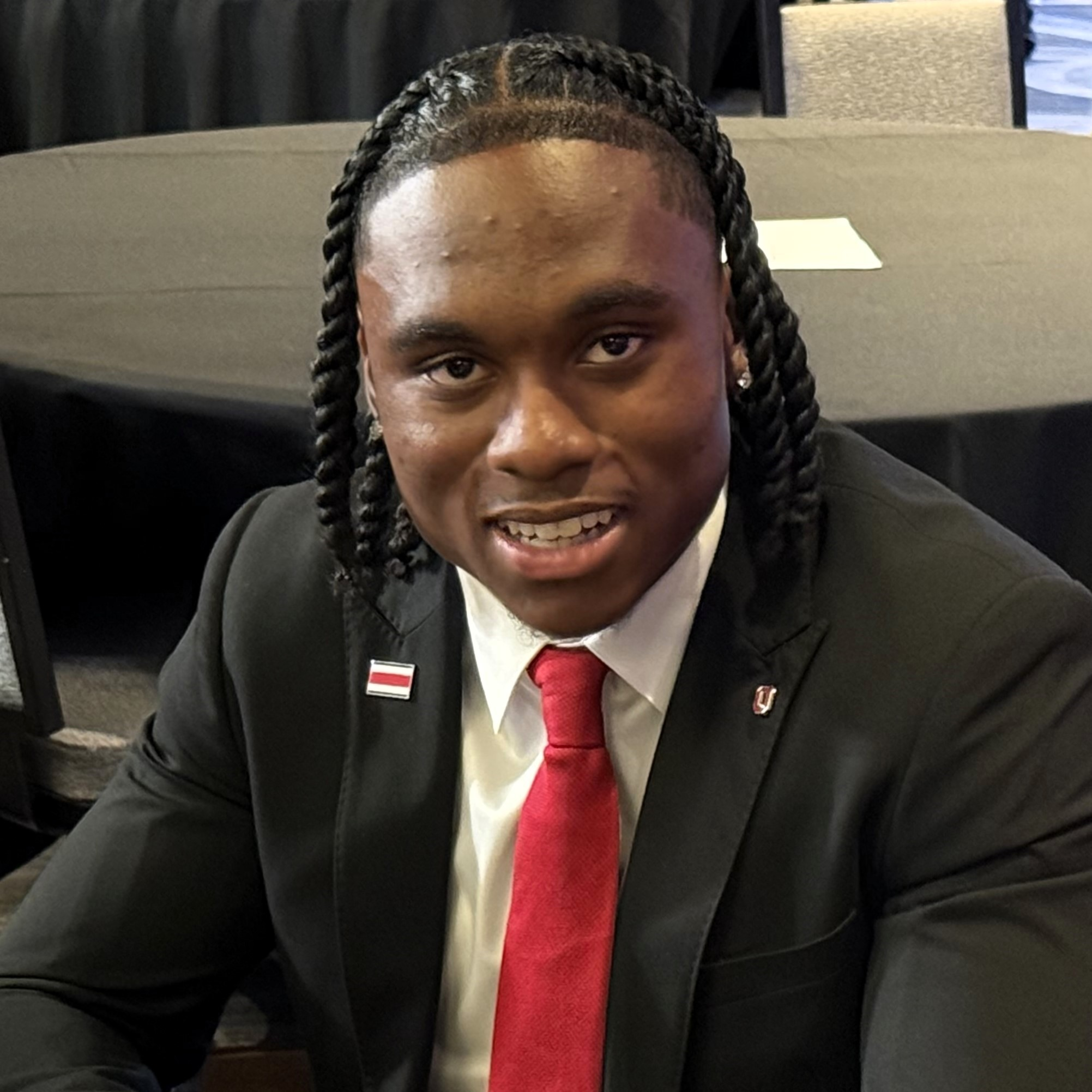
- McClain at 2026 Big Ten Media Day

No. 8 – Ohio State Buckeyes
- Position: Safety
- Class: Junior

Personal information
- Born: June 24, 2006 (age 20)
- Listed height: 6 ft 0 in (1.83 m)
- Listed weight: 201 lb (91 kg)

Career information
- High school: Seton Hall Preparatory (West Orange, New Jersey)
- College: Ohio State (2024–present)

Awards and highlights
- CFP national champion (2024); Third-team All-Big Ten (2025)
- Stats at ESPN

Jaylen McClain (born June 24, 2006) is an American football safety for the Ohio State Buckeyes.

== Early life ==
McClain attended high school at Seton Hall Preparatory School located in Essex County, New Jersey. During his junior season, he notched 83 tackles along with two interception, while also scoring an offensive touchdown. Coming out of high school, McClain was rated as a four-star recruit, the 22nd overall safety, and the 243 overall player in the class of 2024, where he committed to play college football for the Ohio State Buckeyes over offers from other schools such as Georgia, Michigan, Michigan State, Notre Dame, Oregon, Rutgers, Penn State, Stanford, Tennessee, and USC.

== College career ==
During his true freshman season in 2024, he played in all 15 games, notching 15 tackles. Heading into the 2025 season, McClain competed with Malik Hartford for a starting spot in the Buckeyes secondary. Ultimately, he would beat out Hartford, and become the team's starting safety besides Caleb Downs. In week one of the 2025 season, McClain notched eight tackles in a victory over the #1 ranked Texas Longhorns. In week three, he notched a pass deflection, in a 37-9 victory over Ohio.

== Personal life ==
McClain's father, Maurice McClain, was a high school All-American safety before playing at Syracuse from 1999 to 2002.
