= Air Noland =

American football player (born 2005)

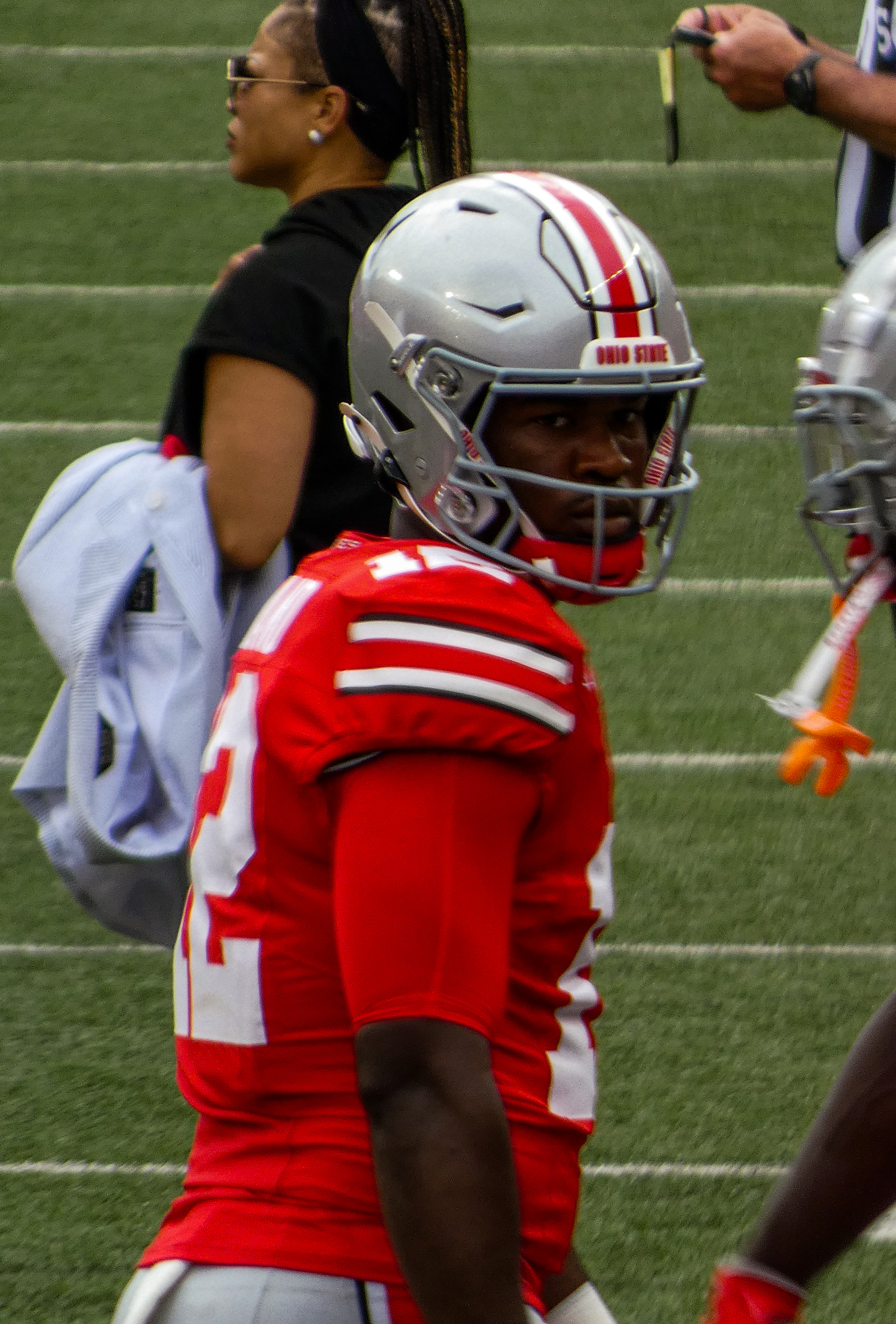
- Noland with the Ohio State Buckeyes in 2024

No. 3 – Memphis Tigers
- Position: Quarterback
- Class: Redshirt Sophomore

Personal information
- Born: October 14, 2005 (age 21); College Park, Georgia, U.S.
- Listed height: 6 ft 2 in (1.88 m)
- Listed weight: 214 lb (97 kg)

Career information
- High school: Langston Hughes (Fairburn, Georgia)
- College: Ohio State (2024); South Carolina (2025); Memphis (2026–present)

Awards and highlights
- CFP national champion (2024)
- Stats at ESPN

Prentiss "Air" Noland III (born October 14, 2005) is an American college football quarterback for the Memphis Tigers. He previously played for the Ohio State Buckeyes and South Carolina Gamecocks.

== Early life ==
Noland played four years of varsity football at Langston Hughes High School in Fairburn, Georgia. Noland started three games his freshman year before becoming the full-time starter his sophomore year. As a sophomore, he led Langston Hughes to a 13-2 record and a Georgia 5A state runner-up finish. In 2022, he led the Panthers to a perfect 15-0 record and a state title, the first in school history. That year he also helped to set the Georgia state record for points scored by a team in a season with 792. Because of his success, he was named Georgia Region 5 6-A Player of the Year and was a MaxPreps Junior All-American. As a senior, he helped Langston Hughes to an 8-3 record and a playoff appearance, slightly regressing under a new offensive coordinator.

Noland was rated a four-star recruit by most recruiting services. He committed to play college football at Ohio State on April 8, 2023 over offers from Alabama, Oregon, and Texas A&M.

College recruiting
Name	Hometown	School	Height	Weight	Commit date
Air Noland; QB	College Park, Georgia	Langston Hughes	6 ft 2 in (1.88 m)	192 lb (87 kg)	Apr 8, 2023
Air Noland; QB	Recruit ratings: Rivals: 247Sports: ESPN: (85)				

== College career ==
=== 2024 season ===
Noland was initially Ohio State's only quarterback commit in the 2024 class, but was joined by Alabama transfer Julian Sayin in the Buckeyes' quarterback room. Noland was fifth on the Buckeyes' quarterback depth chart in 2024, behind Will Howard, Devin Brown, Sayin, and Lincoln Kienholz. He did not make any appearances.

After the season, Noland entered the transfer portal. He committed to South Carolina on December 23, 2024.

=== 2025 season ===
Noland entered his redshirt freshman season fourth on South Carolina's quarterback depth chart, behind LaNorris Sellers, Luke Doty, and Cutter Woods. After appearing in only two contests for the Gamecocks, Noland entered the transfer portal for the second time in his college career. On January 13, 2026, he committed to Memphis.

== Personal life ==
Noland is the son of Prentiss Noland Jr. and Audrey Gill.

Noland is left-handed.
