= Langston Hughes High School =

Public secondary school in Fairburn, Georgia, United States

Location
- 7510 Hall Road; Fairburn, Georgia address United States; 33.6166°N 84.634°W

Information
- Type: Public
- Motto: "United in the Pursuit of Excellence"
- Established: 2009
- School district: Fulton County Public Schools
- CEEB code: 111268
- NCES School ID: 130228003913
- Principal: Dr. Darrell Stephens
- Staff: 103.30 (FTE)
- Grades: 9–12
- Enrollment: 1,828 (2023-2024)
- Student to teacher ratio: 17.70
- Campus: Suburban
- Colors: Green, gold, and black
- Mascot: Panther
- Nickname: LHHS
- Newspaper: The Panther Press
- Website: langstonhughes.fultonschools.org

Langston Hughes High School (LHHS) is a public secondary school located in South Fulton, Georgia, United States, a suburb of metropolitan Atlanta, and with a Fairburn postal address. LHHS is in South Fulton County adjacent to Renaissance Elementary and Renaissance Middle School.

== History ==
The school was completed in May 2009, and opened its doors in August 2009 to educate students in the southern portion of the Fulton County School System. The school was named after Langston Hughes, an American poet, social activist, novelist, playwright, and columnist from Joplin, Missouri. It serves grades 9–12 with an enrollment of 2600. Langston Hughes High School offers dual enrollment programs led by Ms. Sandra Allen. As of 2021–2022, the principal is Octavious Harris.

== Extracurricular activities ==
Fall sports

- Cheerleading
- Cross country
- Football
- Softball
- Volleyball

Winter sports

- Cheerleading
- Boys' basketball
- Girls' basketball
- Wrestling

Spring sports

- Baseball
- Golf
- Boys' soccer
- Girls' soccer
- Boys' tennis
- Girls' tennis
- Boys' track and field
- Girls' track and field

Fine Arts

- Chorus
- Theatre
- Dance

== Notable alumni ==
- Vas Coleman, rapper known as Yung Bans
- Sergio Kitchens, rapper known as Gunna
- Air Noland, football player
- Landers Nolley II, basketball player
- Rodney Shelley, football player
- D'Andre Walker, football player
