= Carlos Locklyn =

American football coach (born 1977)

Current position
- Title: Running backs coach
- Team: Ohio State
- Conference: Big Ten

Biographical details
- Born: October 2, 1977 (age 48); Montgomery, Alabama, U.S.

Playing career
- 1996–1999: Chattanooga
- Position: Running back

Coaching career (HC unless noted)
- 2009: Trezevant High School (OC)
- 2010–2011: Westwood High School (OC/DC)
- 2012–2014: Manassas High School (OC)
- 2015–2016: Cordova High School (OC)
- 2017: Memphis (weight room assistant)
- 2018: Memphis (OA)
- 2019: Memphis (Director of High School Relations)
- 2020: Florida State (Director of High School Relations)
- 2021: Western Kentucky (RB)
- 2022–2023: Oregon (RB)
- 2024–present: Ohio State (RB)

Carlos Locklyn is an American football coach who is currently the running backs coach for the Ohio State Buckeyes.

== Playing career ==
Locklyn played college football for the Chattanooga Mocs from 1996 through 1999, where he rushed for 1,555 yards, while also adding 71 catches for 676 yards. He also played defensive back during his junior season where he tied the team lead in interceptions. After playing college football, Locklyn briefly signed with the New York Giants as an undrafted free agent. Locklyn played Arena football for the Carolina Cobras, Manchester Wolves, and Memphis Xplorers.

== Coaching career ==
Locklyn got his first coaching job in 2009 as the offensive coordinator for Trezevant High School. Over the next seven years, he coached as both an offensive coordinator and defensive coordinator at various high schools across Tennessee. In 2017, Locklyn got his first collegiate coaching job as a weight room assistant for the Memphis Tigers. Over the next two seasons in 2018 and 2019, he served in various roles for the Tigers also serving as an offensive analyst and the director of high school relations. In 2020, Locklyn was hired by the Florida State Seminoles to be the team's director of high school relations, the same role he served in at Memphis. In 2021, he was hired as the running backs coach for the Western Kentucky Hilltoppers. After one season as the Hilltoppers running backs coach, Locklyn left for the same position, being hired by the Oregon Ducks. Ahead of the 2024 season, he left the Ducks to join the Ohio State Buckeyes as the team's running backs coach.
