= Eddrick Houston =

American football player (born 2005)

No. 96 – Ohio State Buckeyes
- Position: Defensive tackle
- Class: Junior

Personal information
- Born: August 22, 2005 (age 21)
- Listed height: 6 ft 3 in (1.91 m)
- Listed weight: 304 lb (138 kg)

Career information
- High school: Buford (Buford, Georgia)
- College: Ohio State (2024–present)

Awards and highlights
- CFP national champion (2024)
- Stats at ESPN

Eddrick Houston (born August 22, 2005) is an American college football defensive tackle for the Ohio State Buckeyes.

== Early life ==
Houston is from Atlanta, Georgia. He grew up playing football and attended Buford High School where he started as a tight end before moving to defensive lineman. In addition to playing football at Buford, he also competed in wrestling and track and field. He won a state championship as a freshman. As a junior, he totaled 64 tackles, 11 tackles-for-loss and 10 sacks. He was selected to the MaxPreps Junior All-America team for his performance. He then posted 45 tackles, five sacks and five forced fumbles as a senior, helping Buford compile a record of 11–2. A five-star prospect, he was ranked a top-30 player nationally and one of the top-five defensive linemen in the 2024 recruiting class. He committed to play college football for the Ohio State Buckeyes.

== College career ==
Houston signed to play defensive end at Ohio State, but moved to defensive tackle as a freshman. As a freshman in the 2024 season, Houston appeared in 11 games and recorded seven tackles as the Buckeyes won the national championship.
