= Tyleik Williams =

American football player (born 2003)

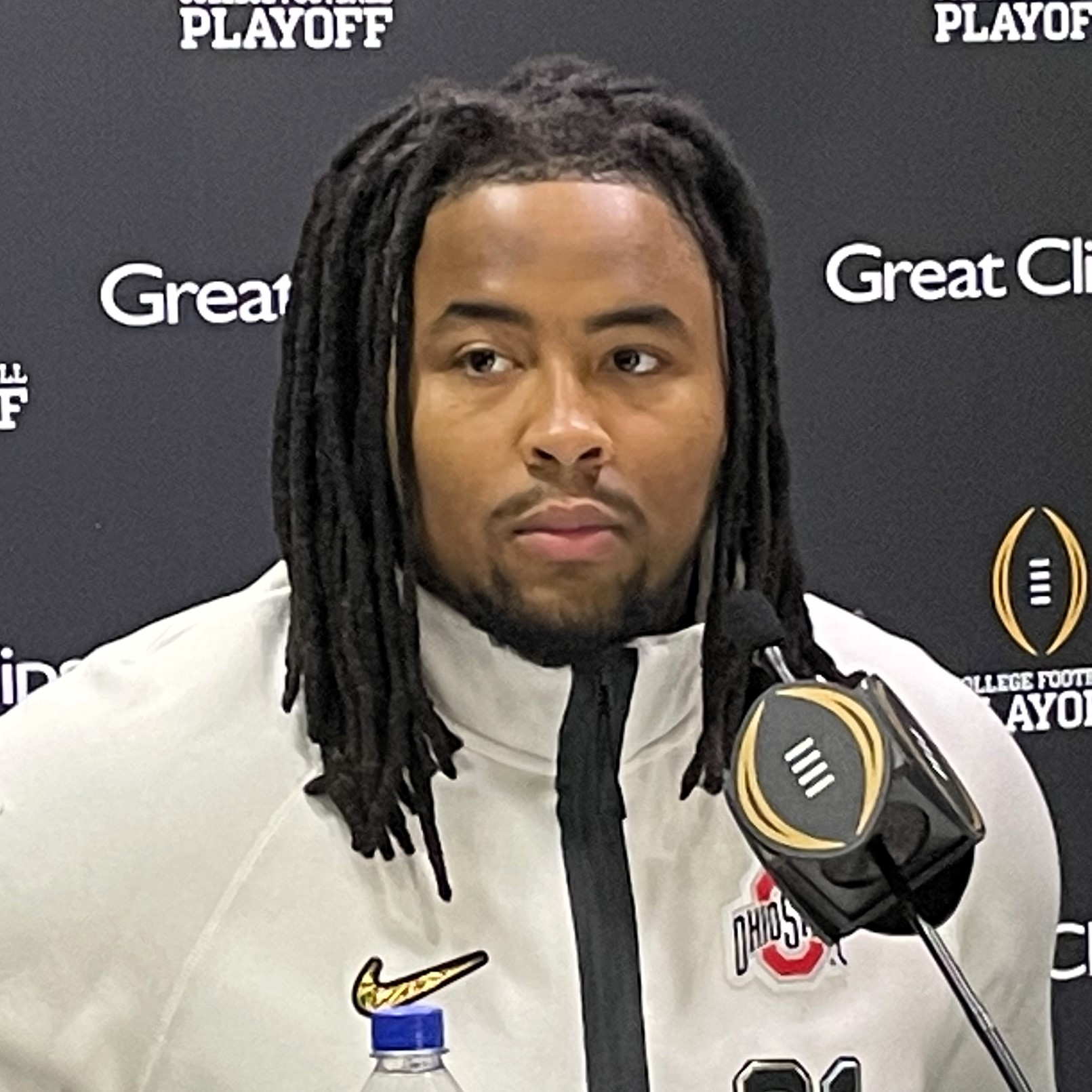
- Williams with the Ohio State Buckeyes in 2025

No. 91 – Detroit Lions
- Position: Defensive tackle
- Roster status: Active

Personal information
- Born: February 25, 2003 (age 23); Fairfax, Virginia, U.S.
- Listed height: 6 ft 3 in (1.91 m)
- Listed weight: 325 lb (147 kg)

Career information
- High school: Unity Reed (Manassas, Virginia)
- College: Ohio State (2021–2024)
- NFL draft: 2025: 1st round, 28th overall pick

Career history
- Detroit Lions (2025–present)

Awards and highlights
- CFP national champion (2024); Second-team All-American (2023); Freshman All-American (2021); Second-team All-Big Ten (2023); Third-team All-Big Ten (2024)

Career NFL statistics as of Week 1, 2026
- Tackles: 21
- Sacks: 1
- Pass deflections: 4
- Stats at Pro Football Reference

Tyleik Williams (born February 25, 2003) is an American professional football defensive tackle for the Detroit Lions of the National Football League (NFL). He played college football for the Ohio State Buckeyes, winning a national championship in 2024. Williams was selected by the Lions in the first round of the 2025 NFL draft.

== Early life ==
Williams was born on February 25, 2003, in Manassas, Virginia, later attending Unity Reed High School. He was selected to play in the 2021 All-American Bowl. He committed to Ohio State University to play college football.

== College career ==
Williams played in 12 games as a true freshman at Ohio State in 2021, recording 16 tackles and five sacks. As a sophomore, he had 21 tackles and one sack. In his senior year, Williams won the 2025 College Football Playoff National Championship, as Ohio State defeated Notre Dame by a score of 34 to 23.

== Professional career ==
Pre-draft measurables
Height	Weight	Arm length	Hand span	Wingspan	10-yard split	20-yard split
6 ft 2 7/8 in (1.90 m)	334 lb (151 kg)	32 in (0.81 m)	10 1/4 in (0.26 m)	6 ft 6 5/8 in (2.00 m)	1.74 s	2.75 s
All values from NFL Combine/Pro Day

Williams was selected by the Detroit Lions in the first round as the 28th overall pick in the 2025 NFL draft.

== NFL career statistics ==
Year	Team	Games		Tackles					Interceptions						Fumbles				
Year	Team	GP	GS	Cmb	Solo	Ast	Sck	TFL	Int	Yds	Avg	Lng	TD	PD	FF	Fmb	FR	Yds	TD
2025	DET	17	10	18	8	10	1.0	2	0	0	0.0	0	0	4	0	0	0	0	0
2026	DET	1	1	3	1	2	0.0	0	0	0	0.0	0	0	0	0	0	0	0	0
Career		18	11	21	9	12	1.0	2	0	0	0.0	0	0	4	0	0	0	0	0
