= Mitchell Melton (American football) =

American football player (born 2002)

No. 54 – Indianapolis Colts
- Position: Defensive end
- Roster status: Practice squad

Personal information
- Born: March 17, 2002 (age 24); Silver Spring, Maryland, U.S.
- Listed height: 6 ft 3 in (1.91 m)
- Listed weight: 253 lb (115 kg)

Career information
- High school: Our Lady of Good Counsel
- College: Ohio State (2020–2024); Virginia (2025)
- NFL draft: 2026: undrafted

Career history
- Indianapolis Colts (2026–present)*
- * Offseason or practice squad member only

Awards and highlights
- CFP national champion (2024)
- Stats at Pro Football Reference

Mitchell Melton (born March 17, 2002) is an American professional football defensive end for the Indianapolis Colts of the National Football League (NFL). He played college football for the Ohio State Buckeyes and for the Virginia Cavaliers.

== Early life ==
Melton attended Our Lady of Good Counsel High School in Olney, Maryland. He was rated as a three-star recruit by 247Sports, committed to play college football for the Ohio State Buckeyes over offers from other schools such as Maryland, Michigan, Nebraska, Notre Dame, Ole Miss, Pittsburgh, Purdue, Texas A&M, Virginia, Virginia Tech, and Wisconsin.

== College career ==
=== Ohio State ===
In his first three seasons from 2020 to 2022, Melton redshirted and only appear in one game due to multiple season-ending injuries. In 2023, he recorded three tackles with all three being for a loss and a sack in eight game. In 2024, Melton helped the Buckeyes win a National Championship, after recording 12 tackles and two sacks. After the conclusion of the season, he entered the NCAA transfer portal.

=== Virginia ===
Melton transferred to play for the Virginia Cavaliers. In 2025, he notched 45 tackles with ten going for a loss, five sacks, an interception, and three forced fumbles. After the season, Melton declared for the NFL draft.

== Professional career ==
Pre-draft measurables
Height	Weight	Arm length	Hand span	Wingspan	40-yard dash	10-yard split	20-yard split	20-yard shuttle	Three-cone drill	Vertical jump	Broad jump	Bench press
6 ft 3 in (1.91 m)	253 lb (115 kg)	33 1/8 in (0.84 m)	9 3/8 in (0.24 m)	6 ft 6 1/2 in (1.99 m)	4.63 s	1.69 s	2.69 s	4.44 s	7.03 s	30.5 in (0.77 m)	9 ft 11 in (3.02 m)	22 reps
All values from Pro Day

After not being selected in the 2026 NFL draft, Melton signed with the Indianapolis Colts as an undrafted free agent. On August 30, 2026, Melton was waived by Indianapolis as a part of final roster cuts; he was re-signed to the team's practice squad the next day.
