= Carson Hinzman =

American football player (born 2004)

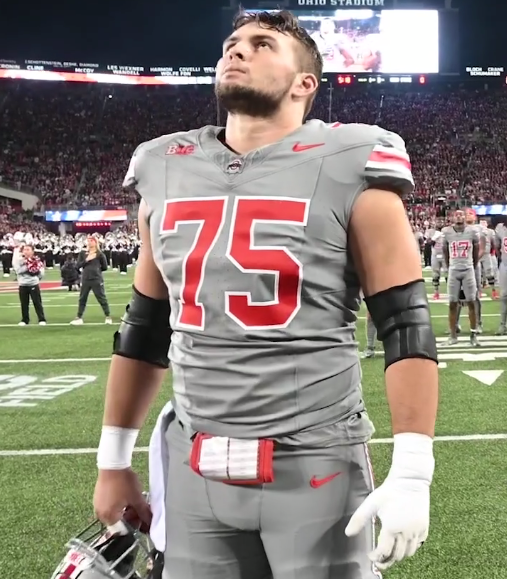
- Hinzman in 2023

No. 75 – Ohio State Buckeyes
- Position: Center
- Class: Redshirt Senior

Personal information
- Born: January 11, 2004 (age 22)
- Listed height: 6 ft 5 in (1.96 m)
- Listed weight: 300 lb (136 kg)

Career information
- High school: Saint Croix Central (Hammond, Wisconsin)
- College: Ohio State (2022–present)

Awards and highlights
- CFP national champion (2024); First-team All-American (2025); Third-team All-Big Ten (2025)
- Stats at ESPN

Carson Hinzman (born January 11, 2004) is an American college football center for the Ohio State Buckeyes.

== Early life ==
Hinzman attended Saint Croix Central High School in his hometown of Hammond, Wisconsin. As a senior, he notched 54 tackles with 16 going for a loss, and two sacks, and he was named the Wisconsin state small school defensive player of the year. Hinzman committed to play college football at the Ohio State University over Wisconsin.

== College career ==
As a freshman in 2022, Hinzman took a redshirt season. During the following offseason, Hinzman competed for the starting center job with transfer Victor Culter. Ultimately, Hinzman earned the starting spot ahead of their season opener versus Indiana.
