= Gee Scott =

American football player (born 2002)

Gee Scott Jr.
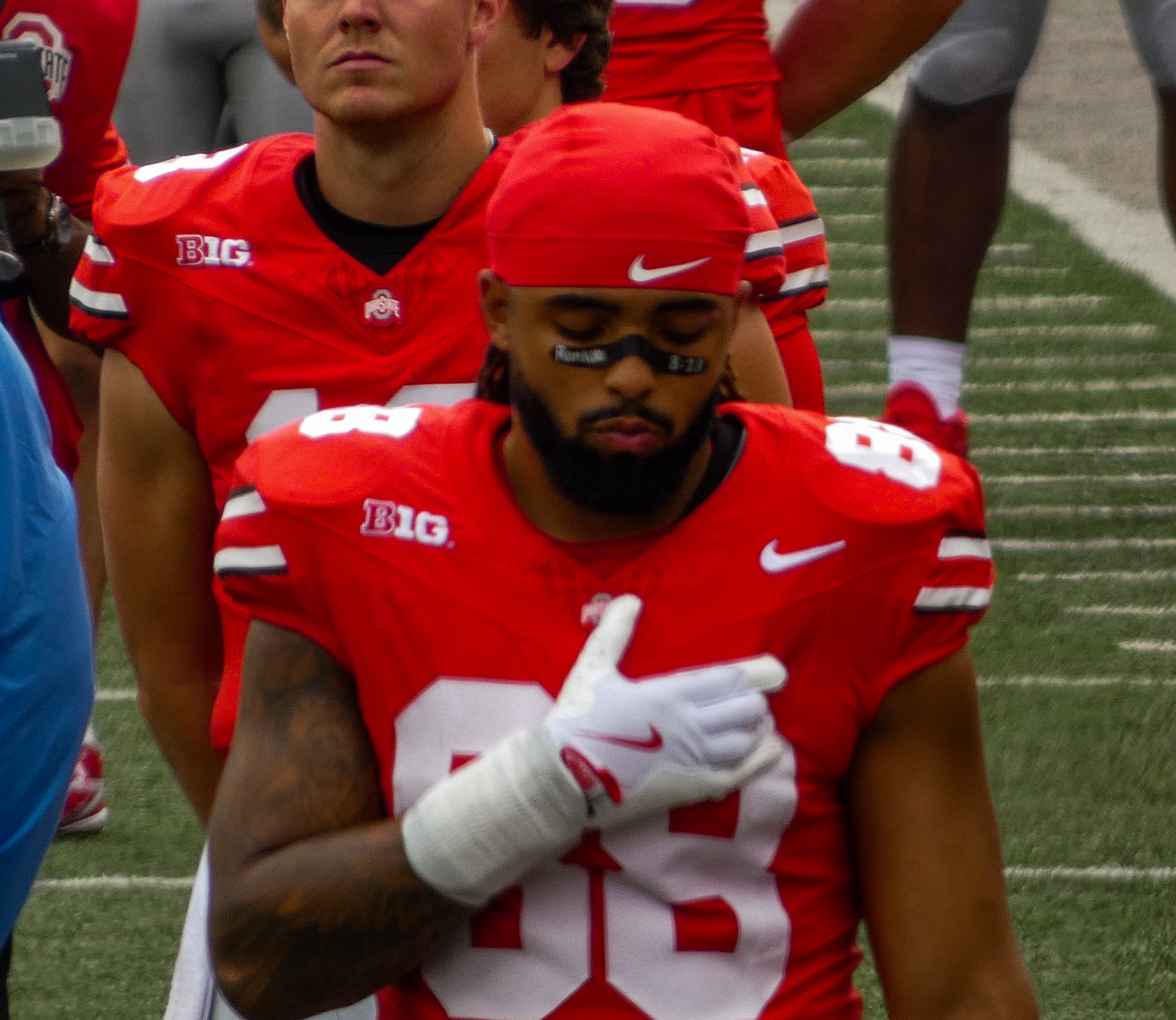
- Scott with the Ohio State Buckeyes in 2024

Profile
- Position: Wide receiver

Personal information
- Born: December 28, 2000 (age 25); Seattle, Washington, U.S.
- Listed height: 6 ft 3 in (1.91 m)
- Listed weight: 238 lb (108 kg)

Career information
- High school: Eastside Catholic (Sammamish, Washington)
- College: Ohio State (2020–2024)
- NFL draft: 2025: undrafted

Career history
- New England Patriots (2025)*; Washington Commanders (2025)*; Columbus Aviators (2026)*; New York Jets (2026)*
- * Offseason or practice squad member only

Awards and highlights
- CFP national champion (2024)
- Stats at Pro Football Reference

Gee Scott Jr. (born December 28, 2000) is an American professional football wide receiver. He played college football for the Ohio State Buckeyes and has also been a member of the NFL's New England Patriots. He was selected by the Columbus Aviators during the 2026 UFL free agent draft.

== Early life ==
Scott was born on December 28, 2000, in Seattle, Washington. He attended Eastside Catholic School in Sammamish, Washington, where he was rated as a four-star recruit and the 70th-best player in the class of 2020, receiving offers from schools such as Florida, Florida State, Washington, and Wisconsin. Scott committed to play college football for the Ohio State Buckeyes.

== College career ==
As a freshman in 2020, Scott appeared in three games while recording no statistics. In 2021, he hauled in five receptions for 42 yards. In week six of the 2022 season, Scott recorded his first collegiate touchdown in a win over Michigan State. He finished the 2022 season with five receptions for 28 yards. During the 2023 season, Scott notched ten receptions for 70 yards and a touchdown.

== Professional career ==
Pre-draft measurables
Height	Weight	Arm length	Hand span	Wingspan	40-yard dash	10-yard split	20-yard split	20-yard shuttle	Three-cone drill	Vertical jump	Broad jump	Bench press
6 ft 2 5/8 in (1.90 m)	238 lb (108 kg)	32 3/8 in (0.82 m)	10 1/8 in (0.26 m)	6 ft 5 1/2 in (1.97 m)	4.60 s	1.64 s	2.66 s	4.40 s	7.28 s	35.0 in (0.89 m)	9 ft 11 in (3.02 m)	25 reps
All values from Pro Day

=== New England Patriots ===
On May 9, 2025, Scott signed with the New England Patriots as an undrafted free agent after going unselected in the 2025 NFL draft. He was waived on August 26 as part of final roster cuts. On September 24, Scott was re-signed to the practice squad. On October 14, Scott was released from the practice squad.

=== Washington Commanders ===
On December 16, 2025, Scott signed with the Washington Commanders' practice squad.

=== Columbus Aviators ===
On January 14, 2026, Scott was selected by the Columbus Aviators of the United Football League (UFL). He was released by the Aviators on February 5.

=== New York Jets ===
On June 4, 2026, Scott signed with the New York Jets. He was waived/injured by the Jets on July 31.

== Personal life ==
He is a Christian.
