= Malik Hartford =

American football player (born 2005)

No. 12 – UCLA Bruins
- Position: Safety
- Class: Redshirt Junior

Personal information
- Born: March 19, 2005 (age 21)
- Listed height: 6 ft 2 in (1.88 m)
- Listed weight: 194 lb (88 kg)

Career information
- High school: Lakota West (West Chester, Ohio)
- College: Ohio State (2023–2025); UCLA (2026–present)

Awards and highlights
- CFP national champion (2024)
- Stats at ESPN

Malik Hartford (born March 19, 2005) is an American college football safety. He plays for the UCLA Bruins. He formerly played for the Ohio State Buckeyes.

== Early life ==
Hartford attended Lakota West High School in West Chester, Ohio. As a senior, he notched 43 tackles with four being for a loss, two interceptions, and one defensive touchdown. Hartford committed to play college football at Ohio State.

== College career ==
Hartford entered spring workouts with the Buckeyes weighing 169 pounds but bulked his weight up to over 190 pounds. During the spring and summer, he competed for a starting safety role. Hartford got his first career start in week 2 of the 2023 season versus Youngstown State. In week 10 versus Rutgers, he notched a tackle and a pass deflection.

At the conclusion of the 2025 season, Hartford entered the transfer portal after missing the majority of his junior season with a shoulder injury.
