= 2025 Ohio State Buckeyes football team =

American college football season

2025 Ohio State Buckeyes football

Big Ten Championship Game, L 10–13 vs. Indiana

Cotton Bowl (CFP Quarterfinal), L 14–24 vs. Miami (FL)
- Conference: Big Ten Conference

Ranking
- Coaches: No. 6
- AP: No. 5
- Record: 12–2 (9–0 Big Ten)
- Head coach: Ryan Day (7th season)
- Offensive coordinator: Brian Hartline (3rd season)
- Co-offensive coordinator: Keenan Bailey (1st season)
- Offensive scheme: Spread option
- Defensive coordinator: Matt Patricia (1st season)
- Co-defensive coordinator: Tim Walton (1st season)
- Base defense: 4–2–5
- Captains: Caleb Downs; Brandon Inniss; Austin Siereveld; Sonny Styles
- Home stadium: Ohio Stadium

2025 Big Ten Conference football standings
	Conf.			Overall
Team	W		L	W		L
No. 1 Indiana y$#^	9	–	0	16	–	0
No. 5 Ohio State y^	9	–	0	12	–	2
No. 4 Oregon ^	8	–	1	13	–	2
No. 21 Michigan	7	–	2	9	–	4
No. 20 USC	7	–	2	9	–	4
No. 17 Iowa	6	–	3	9	–	4
Illinois	5	–	4	9	–	4
Washington	5	–	4	9	–	4
Minnesota	5	–	4	8	–	5
Nebraska	4	–	5	7	–	6
Northwestern	4	–	5	7	–	6
Penn State	3	–	6	7	–	6
UCLA	3	–	6	3	–	9
Rutgers	2	–	7	5	–	7
Wisconsin	2	–	7	4	–	8
Maryland	1	–	8	4	–	8
Michigan State	1	–	8	4	–	8
Purdue	0	–	9	2	–	10
Championship: Indiana 13, Ohio State 10
# – College Football Playoff champion; ^ – College Football Playoff participant; $ – Conference champion; y – Championship game participant; As of October 27, 2026; Rankings from AP Poll

The 2025 Ohio State Buckeyes football team represented the Ohio State University as a member of the Big Ten Conference during the 2025 NCAA Division I FBS football season. They were led by seventh-year head coach Ryan Day, and played their home games at Ohio Stadium in Columbus, Ohio. It was the Buckeyes' 136th season overall and 113th as a member of the Big Ten. Ohio State attempted to repeat as national champions, failing to do so after losing to Miami in the quarterfinals of the playoffs. Ohio State defeated all three of their rivals, including rival Michigan and achieved a perfect 12–0 regular season for the first time since 2019, and advanced to the Big Ten Football Championship Game for the first time since 2020. Ohio State never trailed in the second half during the regular season. Ohio State also held all of their regular season opponents to 16 points or less, the first team to do so since the 1975 Florida Gators.

Their home opener against Texas reached a record-breaking 16.1 million viewers, making it the most-watched Week 1 game in college football history. Their regular season finale against Michigan reached 18.4 million viewers, making it the most-watched 2025 regular season game. Their appearance in the Big Ten Championship against Indiana reached a record-breaking 18.3 million viewers, making it the most-watched conference championship in college football history.

== Offseason ==
Positions key
Offense	Defense	Special teams
QB — Quarterback; RB — Running back; FB — Fullback; WR — Wide receiver; TE — Tight end; OL — Offensive lineman; T — Tackle; G — Guard; C — Center	DL — Defensive lineman; DT — Defensive tackle (Note: Includes nose tackle (NT)); DE — Defensive end; EDGE — Edge rusher; LB — Linebacker (Note: Includes middle linebacker (MLB/MIKE), weakside linebacker (WILL), strongside linebacker (SAM), off-ball linebacker, and outside linebacker (OLB)); DB — Defensive back; CB — Cornerback; S — Safety (Note: Includes free safety (FS) and strong safety (SS))	K — Kicker (Note: Also known as a placekicker (PK)); P — Punter; LS — Long snapper; RS — Return specialist (Note: Includes kickoff and punt returners)

=== Coaching staff changes ===
==== Departures ====
Name	Position	New team	New position
Sean Binckes	Graduate assistant - offense	Las Vegas Raiders	Offensive assistant
LaAllan Clark	Graduate assistant - defense	Texas	Outside linebackers coach
Tim Drevno	Quality control - offense	Texas	Offensive consultant
Gerren DuHart	Program assistant - defense	None	
Justin Frye	Offensive line coach	Arizona Cardinals	Offensive line coach
Chip Kelly	Offensive coordinator/quarterbacks coach	Las Vegas Raiders	Offensive coordinator
Jim Knowles	Defensive coordinator	Penn State	Defensive coordinator
Riley Larkin	Program assistant - offense	New England Patriots	Offensive assistant
Joe Lyberger	Quality control - defense	None	
Mike Sollenne	Graduate assistant - offense	UNLV	Offensive line coach
Brent Zdebski	Quality control - defense	Penn State	Defensive analyst/analytics coordinator

==== Additions ====
Name	Position	Previous team	Previous position
Tyler Bowen	Offensive line coach/run game coordinator	Virginia Tech	Offensive coordinator/quarterbacks coach
Josh Boyer	Quality control - defense	Miami Dolphins	Defensive coordinator
Charlie Dickey	Program assistant - offensive line	Oklahoma State	Offensive line coach
Nate Ebner	Quality control - special teams	None	
Billy Fessler	Quarterbacks coach	Akron	Offensive coordinator/quarterbacks coach
Austin Fields	Quality control - offense	Virginia Tech	Assistant offensive line coach/quality control specialist
Marcus Johnson	Assistant offensive line coach	Purdue	Offensive line coach
Taver Johnson	Analyst - defensive backs	Philadelphia Eagles	Assistant defensive backs coach
Colin Keanu	Program assistant - quarterbacks	Western Illinois	Wide receivers coach
Wendy Laurent	Assistant tight ends coach	Dartmouth	Tight ends coach
Matt Patricia	Defensive coordinator	Philadelphia Eagles	Senior defensive assistant
Miguel Patrick	Quality control - defense	UAB	Defensive line coach
Tyler Walton	Program assistant - cornerbacks	None	
Tony Washington	Program assistant - defensive line	UCLA	Defensive line/outside linebackers coach
Billy Yates	Quality control - defense	New England Patriots	Assistant offensive line coach

=== Players drafted into the NFL ===
Round	Pick	NFL team	Player	Position
1	19	Tampa Bay Buccaneers	Emeka Egbuka	WR
1	24	Minnesota Vikings	Donovan Jackson	OG
1	28	Detroit Lions	Tyleik Williams	DT
1	32	Kansas City Chiefs	Josh Simmons	OT
2	36	Cleveland Browns	Quinshon Judkins	RB
2	38	New England Patriots	TreVeyon Henderson	RB
2	45	Indianapolis Colts	JT Tuimoloau	DE
4	115	Arizona Cardinals	Cody Simon	LB
4	122	Carolina Panthers	Lathan Ransom	S
4	123	Pittsburgh Steelers	Jack Sawyer	DE
5	148	Los Angeles Rams	Ty Hamilton	DT
5	170	Buffalo Bills	Jordan Hancock	CB
5	174	Arizona Cardinals	Denzel Burke	CB
6	185	Pittsburgh Steelers	Will Howard	QB
Undrafted		Arizona Cardinals	Josh Fryar	OT
Undrafted		Cincinnati Bengals	Seth McLaughlin	C
Undrafted		New England Patriots	Gee Scott Jr.	TE

=== Transfers ===
==== Outgoing ====
The Buckeyes lost 17 players to the transfer portal.

Player	Number	Position	Height	Weight	Class	Hometown	New school
Kojo Antwi	#14	WR	6'0"	194	Junior	Suwanee, GA	Colorado State
Jayden Ballard	#9	WR	6'2"	195	Senior	Massillon, OH	Wisconsin
Jayden Bonsu	#21	S	6'2"	207	Sophomore	Hillside, NJ	Pittsburgh
Devin Brown	#33	QB	6'3"	212	Junior	Gilbert, AZ	California
Morrow Evans	#41	LS	6'1"	205	Freshman	Bellaire, TX	UCLA
George Fitzpatrick	#68	OL	6'6"	313	Junior	Englewood, CO	Kansas State
Patrick Gurd	#49	TE	6'4"	249	Senior	New Albany, OH	Cincinnati
Collin Johnson	#96	LS	6'1"	215	Senior	New Albany, OH	Withdrawn
Hero Kanu	#93	DT	6'5"	305	Junior	Geltendorf, Germany	Texas
Mitchell Melton	#17	LB	6'3"	245	Senior	Silver Spring, MD	Virginia
Zen Michalski	#65	OL	6'6"	319	Senior	Floyds Knobs, IN	Indiana
Air Noland	#12	QB	6'2"	192	Freshman	College Park, GA	South Carolina
Gabe Powers	#36	LB	6'4"	242	Junior	Marysville, OH	Kansas State
Rashid SeSay	#30	RB	5'11'	190	Freshman	Zanesville, OH	West Liberty
Calvin Simpson-Hunt	#22	CB	6'0"	204	Sophomore	Waxahachie, TX	Baylor
Austin Snyder	#98	K	5'7"	194	Senior	Groveport, OH	Texas Tech
Reis Stocksdale	#87	WR	5'10"	188	Graduate	Morrow, OH	Bowling Green
Anthony Venneri	#35	P	6'0"	225	Junior	Toronto, Ontario	UCF
Miles Walker	#76	OL	6'5"	317	Sophomore	Greenwich, CT	Boise State
Sam Williams-Dixon	#24	RB	5'11"	203	Freshman	Pickerington, OH	Withdrawn

==== Incoming ====
The Buckeyes added 10 players from the transfer portal.

Player	Number	Position	Height	Weight	Class	Hometown	Previous school
Beau Atkinson	#14	DL	6'6"	258	Senior	Raleigh, NC	North Carolina
Eli Brickhandler	#6	QB	6'2"	211	Graduate	Stockton, CA	Houston Christian
Jackson Courville	#96	K	5'10"	185	Junior	Centerville, OH	Ball State
Phillip Daniels	#70	OL	6'5"	315	Junior	Cincinnati, OH	Minnesota
CJ Donaldson	#12	RB	6'2"	238	Senior	Miami, FL	West Virginia
Logan George	#48	DL	6'5"	259	Junior	Pocatello, ID	Idaho State
Ty Howard	#25	LB	6'0"	200	Senior	Cleveland, OH	Duquesne
Max Klare	#86	TE	6'4"	240	Junior	Guilford, IN	Purdue
Ethan Onianwa	#78	OL	6'7"	331	Senior	Katy, TX	Rice
Justin Terry	#65	OL	6'5"	324	Sophomore	Pickerington, OH	West Virginia

=== Recruiting class ===
College recruiting (2025)
Name	Hometown	School	Height	Weight	Commit date
Devin Sanchez; CB	Houston, Texas	North Shore Senior High School	6 ft 2 in (1.88 m)	170 lb (77 kg)	Jan 6, 2024
Devin Sanchez; CB	Recruit ratings: Rivals: 247Sports: ESPN: (91)				
Tavien St. Clair; QB	Bellefontaine, Ohio	Bellefontaine High School	6 ft 4 in (1.93 m)	225 lb (102 kg)	Jun 21, 2023
Tavien St. Clair; QB	Recruit ratings: Rivals: 247Sports: ESPN: (90)				
Faheem Delane; S	Olney, Maryland	Our Lady of Good Counsel High School	6 ft 2.5 in (1.89 m)	195 lb (88 kg)	Jun 21, 2023
Faheem Delane; S	Recruit ratings: Rivals: 247Sports: ESPN: (86)				
Riley Pettijohn; LB	McKinney, Texas	McKinney High School	6 ft 1.5 in (1.87 m)	215 lb (98 kg)	Jul 6, 2024
Riley Pettijohn; LB	Recruit ratings: Rivals: 247Sports: ESPN: (84)				
Tarvos Alford; LB	Vero Beach, Florida	Vero Beach High School	6 ft 2 in (1.88 m)	210 lb (95 kg)	Mar 30, 2024
Tarvos Alford; LB	Recruit ratings: Rivals: 247Sports: ESPN: (84)				
Zion Grady; Edge	Enterprise, Alabama	Enterprise High School	6 ft 4 in (1.93 m)	235 lb (107 kg)	Jun 24, 2024
Zion Grady; Edge	Recruit ratings: Rivals: 247Sports: ESPN: (84)				
Quincy Porter; WR	Oradell, New Jersey	Bergen Catholic High School	6 ft 3 in (1.91 m)	190 lb (86 kg)	Jun 14, 2024
Quincy Porter; WR	Recruit ratings: Rivals: 247Sports: ESPN: (84)				
Lamar "Bo" Jackson; RB	Cleveland, Ohio	Villa Angela-St. Joseph High School	6 ft 0 in (1.83 m)	205 lb (93 kg)	Jun 4, 2024
Lamar "Bo" Jackson; RB	Recruit ratings: Rivals: 247Sports: ESPN: (83)				
Carter Lowe; OT	Toledo, Ohio	Whitmer High School	6 ft 5 in (1.96 m)	290 lb (130 kg)	Jan 27, 2024
Carter Lowe; OT	Recruit ratings: Rivals: 247Sports: ESPN: (83)				
Anthony Rogers; RB	Montgomery, Alabama	G.W. Carver High School	5 ft 8 in (1.73 m)	190 lb (86 kg)	Dec 4, 2024
Anthony Rogers; RB	Recruit ratings: Rivals: 247Sports: ESPN: (83)				
Nate Roberts; TE	Washington, Oklahoma	Washington High School	6 ft 4 in (1.93 m)	235 lb (107 kg)	Apr 13, 2024
Nate Roberts; TE	Recruit ratings: Rivals: 247Sports: ESPN: (82)				
Phillip Bell; WR	Mission Viejo, California	Mission Viejo High School	6 ft 2 in (1.88 m)	195 lb (88 kg)	Aug 31, 2024
Phillip Bell; WR	Recruit ratings: Rivals: 247Sports: ESPN: (81)				
De'zie Jones; WR	Wayne, New Jersey	DePaul Catholic High School	6 ft 0 in (1.83 m)	180 lb (82 kg)	Mar 30, 2024
De'zie Jones; WR	Recruit ratings: Rivals: 247Sports: ESPN: (81)				
Maxwell Roy; DL	Philadelphia, Pennsylvania	St. Joseph's Preparatory School	6 ft 3 in (1.91 m)	285 lb (129 kg)	Jul 1, 2024
Maxwell Roy; DL	Recruit ratings: Rivals: 247Sports: ESPN: (81)				
DeShawn Stewart; S	Wayne, New Jersey	DePaul Catholic High School	6 ft 2 in (1.88 m)	185 lb (84 kg)	Mar 31, 2024
DeShawn Stewart; S	Recruit ratings: Rivals: 247Sports: ESPN: (81)				
Jarquez Carter; DL	Newberry, Florida	Newberry High School	6 ft 2 in (1.88 m)	284 lb (129 kg)	Jul 18, 2024
Jarquez Carter; DL	Recruit ratings: Rivals: 247Sports: ESPN: (80)				
Epi Sitanilei; Edge	Bellflower, California	St. John Bosco High School	6 ft 5 in (1.96 m)	220 lb (100 kg)	Dec 4, 2024
Epi Sitanilei; Edge	Recruit ratings: Rivals: 247Sports: ESPN: (80)				
Trajen Odom; DL	Matthews, North Carolina	Weddington High School	6 ft 4 in (1.93 m)	285 lb (129 kg)	Jun 28, 2024
Trajen Odom; DL	Recruit ratings: Rivals: 247Sports: ESPN: (80)				
Bodpegn Miller; WR	Mansfield, Ohio	Ontario High School	6 ft 4 in (1.93 m)	180 lb (82 kg)	Jun 21, 2024
Bodpegn Miller; WR	Recruit ratings: Rivals: 247Sports: ESPN: (79)				
Jake Cook; IOL	Westerville, Ohio	Westerville North High School	6 ft 5 in (1.96 m)	295 lb (134 kg)	Jun 23, 2024
Jake Cook; IOL	Recruit ratings: Rivals: 247Sports: ESPN: (79)				
Jayvon McFadden; IOL	Upper Marlboro, Maryland	Riverdale Baptist School	6 ft 5 in (1.96 m)	300 lb (140 kg)	Aug 24, 2024
Jayvon McFadden; IOL	Recruit ratings: Rivals: 247Sports: ESPN: (79)				
Brody Lennon; TE	Gates Mills, Ohio	Gilmour Academy	6 ft 4 in (1.93 m)	220 lb (100 kg)	Jun 27, 2024
Brody Lennon; TE	Recruit ratings: Rivals: 247Sports: ESPN: (79)				
Isaiah West; RB	Philadelphia, Pennsylvania	St. Joseph's Preparatory School	5 ft 11 in (1.80 m)	208 lb (94 kg)	Jun 16, 2024
Isaiah West; RB	Recruit ratings: Rivals: 247Sports: ESPN: (79)				
Cody Haddad; S	Cleveland, Ohio	Saint Ignatius High School	6 ft 1 in (1.85 m)	175 lb (79 kg)	Apr 13, 2024
Cody Haddad; S	Recruit ratings: Rivals: 247Sports: ESPN: (78)				
Eli Lee; LB	Akron, Ohio	Archbishop Hoban High School	6 ft 3 in (1.91 m)	230 lb (100 kg)	Oct 25, 2023
Eli Lee; LB	Recruit ratings: Rivals: 247Sports: ESPN: (77)				
Jordyn Woods; CB	Cartersville, Georgia	Cartersville High School	6 ft 3 in (1.91 m)	175 lb (79 kg)	Nov 25, 2024
Jordyn Woods; CB	Recruit ratings: Rivals: 247Sports: ESPN: (76)				
Overall recruit ranking: Rivals: 4 247Sports: 5 ESPN: —
Note: In many cases, Scout, Rivals, 247Sports, On3, and ESPN may conflict in their listings of height and weight.; In these cases, the average was taken. ESPN grades are on a 100-point scale.; Sources: "2025 Ohio State Football Commitment List". Rivals.; "2025 Ohio State Football Commitment List". ESPN.; "2025 Team Ranking". Rivals.com.; "Ohio State 2025 Football Commits". 247Sports.

==== Recruiting class rankings ====
Website	National rank	Conference rank	5 star recruits	4 star recruits	3 star recruits	Total
247Sports	5	2	2	14	10	26
ESPN	—	—	2	16	8	26
Rivals	4	2	3	18	5	26

==== Walk-ons ====
Player	Number	Position	Height	Weight	Class	Hometown	Previous school
Dylan Furshman	#54	LB	6'0"	210	Freshman	Jupiter, FL	The Benjamin School
Ian Gecse (Note: Gecse played on Ohio State's club football team before walking-on.)	#57	OL	6'4"	260	Junior	Grandview Heights, OH	Grandview Heights High School
Jaystin Gwinn	#35	S	5'10"	206	Freshman	Westerville, OH	Westerville Central High School
Stanley Jackson Jr.	#28	RB	5'11"	218	Sophomore	Westerville, OH	Marshall
Omar Jah	#36	CB	5'11"	181	Freshman	Lewis Center, OH	Olentangy High School
Grant Mills	#41	LS	5'10"	223	Sophomore	Mooresville, NC	North Carolina
Trey Robinette	#14	QB	6'3"	189	Freshman	Washington Court House, OH	Miami Trace High School
JJ Sebert	#32	S	5'11"	190	Sophomore	Pickerington, OH	Bucknell
Kolton Stover	#26	QB	6'4"	198	Freshman	Centerburg, OH	Highland High School
Gavin Thobe	#49	S	6'2"	190	Freshman	Bellbrook, OH	Bellbrook High School
Preston Wolfe	#30	WR	6'1"	170	Sophomore	Columbus, OH	Indiana State

== Schedule ==
Date	Time	Opponent	Rank	Site	TV	Result	Attendance
August 30	12:00 p.m.	No. 1 Texas*	No. 3	Ohio Stadium; Columbus, OH (College GameDay, Big Noon Kickoff)	FOX	W 14–7	107,524
September 6	3:30 p.m.	Grambling State*	No. 1	Ohio Stadium; Columbus, OH	BTN	W 70–0	100,624
September 13	7:00 p.m.	Ohio*	No. 1	Ohio Stadium; Columbus, OH	Peacock	W 37–9	105,765
September 27	3:30 p.m.	at Washington	No. 1	Husky Stadium; Seattle, WA	CBS	W 24–6	72,485
October 4	7:30 p.m.	Minnesota^{†}	No. 1	Ohio Stadium; Columbus, OH	NBC	W 42–3	105,114
October 11	12:00 p.m.	at No. 17 Illinois	No. 1	Gies Memorial Stadium; Champaign, IL (Illibuck, Big Noon Kickoff)	FOX	W 34–16	60,670
October 18	3:30 p.m.	at Wisconsin	No. 1	Camp Randall Stadium; Madison, WI	CBS	W 34–0	72,795
November 1	12:00 p.m.	Penn State	No. 1	Ohio Stadium; Columbus, OH (rivalry, Big Noon Kickoff)	FOX	W 38–14	105,517
November 8	1:00 p.m.	at Purdue	No. 1	Ross–Ade Stadium; West Lafayette, IN	BTN	W 34–10	57,701
November 15	7:30 p.m.	UCLA	No. 1	Ohio Stadium; Columbus, OH	NBC	W 48–10	104,168
November 22	12:00 p.m.	Rutgers	No. 1	Ohio Stadium; Columbus, OH	FOX	W 42–9	100,023
November 29	12:00 p.m.	at No. 15 Michigan	No. 1	Michigan Stadium; Ann Arbor, MI (rivalry, College GameDay, Big Noon Kickoff)	FOX	W 27–9	111,373
December 6	8:00 p.m.	vs. No. 2 Indiana	No. 1	Lucas Oil Stadium; Indianapolis, IN (Big Ten Championship Game, Big Noon Kickoff)	FOX	L 10–13	68,214
December 31	7:30 p.m.	vs. (10) No. 10 Miami (FL)*	(2) No. 2	AT&T Stadium; Arlington, TX (Cotton Bowl Classic–CFP Quarterfinal)	ESPN	L 14–24	71,323
*Non-conference game; ^{†}Homecoming; Rankings from AP Poll (and CFP Rankings, after November 4) - Released prior to game; All times are in Eastern time; Source:

== Rankings ==
Ranking movements Legend: ██ Increase in ranking ██ Decrease in ranking ( ) = First-place votes
	Week																
Poll	Pre	1	2	3	4	5	6	7	8	9	10	11	12	13	14	15	Final
AP	3 (11)	1 (55)	1 (57)	1 (55)	1 (52)	1 (46)	1 (40)	1 (50)	1 (60)	1 (54)	1 (54)	1 (55)	1 (57)	1 (58)	1 (61)	3	5
Coaches	2 (20)	1 (59)	1 (62)	1 (62)	1 (61)	1 (58)	1 (59)	1 (63)	1 (65)	1 (62)	1 (60)	1 (59)	1 (61)	1 (61)	1 (63)	3	6
CFP	Not released										1	1	1	1	1	2	Not released

== Game summaries ==
=== No. 1 Texas ===
No. 1 Texas Longhorns (0–0) at No. 3 Ohio State Buckeyes (0–0) – Game summary

Quarter	1	2	3	4	Total
No. 1 Longhorns	0	0	0	7	7
No. 3 Buckeyes	0	7	0	7	14

at Ohio Stadium • Columbus, Ohio

- Date: August 30
- Game time: 12:00 p.m.
- Game weather: Sunny • Temperature: 67 °F (19 °C) • Wind: NE at 5 miles per hour (8.0 km/h)
- Game attendance: 107,524
- Referee: David Smith
- TV announcers (FOX): Gus Johnson (play-by-play), Joel Klatt (analyst), Jenny Taft, and Tom Rinaldi (sideline reporters)
- Box score, Recap

Game information

First quarter

- No scoring plays.

Second quarter

- (8:57) OSU – CJ Donaldson 1-yard run, Jayden Fielding kick (Drive: 13 plays, 80 yards, 8:01; Ohio State 7–0)

Third quarter

- No scoring plays.

Fourth quarter

- (13:08) OSU – Carnell Tate 40-yard pass from Julian Sayin, Jayden Fielding kick (Drive: 7 plays, 68 yards, 4:53; Ohio State 14–0)
- (3:28) TEX – Parker Livingstone 32-yard pass from Arch Manning, Mason Shipley kick (Drive: 4 plays, 60 yards, 0:42; Ohio State 14–7)

Statistics	TEX	OSU
First downs	16	11
Plays–yards	67–336	54–203
Rushes–yards	37–166	34–77
Passing yards	170	126
Passing: comp–att–int	17–30–1	13–20–0
Turnovers	1	0
Time of possession	27:55	32:05

Team	Category	Player	Statistics
Texas	Passing	Arch Manning	17/30, 170 yards, TD, INT
Texas	Rushing	Quintrevion Wisner	16 carries, 80 yards
Texas	Receiving	Jack Endries	4 receptions, 50 yards
Ohio State	Passing	Julian Sayin	13/20, 126 yards, TD
Ohio State	Rushing	CJ Donaldson	19 carries, 67 yards, TD
Ohio State	Receiving	Carnell Tate	2 receptions, 49 yards, TD

=== Grambling State (FCS) ===
Grambling State Tigers (FCS) (1–0) at No. 1 Ohio State Buckeyes (1–0) – Game summary

Quarter	1	2	3	4	Total
Tigers (FCS)	0	0	0	0	0
No. 1 Buckeyes	21	14	21	14	70

at Ohio Stadium • Columbus, Ohio

- Date: September 6
- Game time: 3:30 p.m.
- Game weather: Cloudy • Temperature: 69 °F (21 °C) • Wind: W at 8 miles per hour (13 km/h)
- Game attendance: 100,624
- Referee: Andrew Speciale
- TV announcers (BTN): Jeff Levering (play-by-play), Jake Butt (analyst), and Brooke Fletcher (sideline reporter)
- Box score, Recap

Game information

First quarter

- (12:39) OSU – Will Kacmarek 47-yard pass from Julian Sayin, Jayden Fielding kick (Drive: 6 plays, 83 yards, 2:16; Ohio State 7–0)
- (8:54) OSU – Jeremiah Smith 87-yard pass from Julian Sayin, Jayden Fielding kick (Drive: 1 play, 87 yards, 0:12; Ohio State 14–0)
- (4:10) OSU – Carnell Tate 13-yard pass from Julian Sayin, Jayden Fielding kick (Drive: 7 plays, 65 yards, 3:19; Ohio State 21–0)

Second quarter

- (11:38) OSU – Jeremiah Smith 9-yard pass from Julian Sayin, Jayden Fielding kick (Drive: 6 plays, 80 yards, 2:46; Ohio State 28–0)
- (0:57) OSU – CJ Donaldson 2-yard run, Jayden Fielding kick (Drive: 8 plays, 62 yards, 3:19; Ohio State 35–0)

Third quarter

- (14:50) OSU – Riley Pettijohn 23-yard fumble return, Jayden Fielding kick (Ohio State 42–0)
- (8:24) OSU – Bo Jackson 11-yard run, Jackson Courville kick (Drive: 9 plays, 76 yards, 3:40; Ohio State 49–0)
- (6:16) OSU – Isaiah West 12-yard run, Jackson Courville kick (Drive: 3 plays, 41 yards, 1:15; Ohio State 56–0)

Fourth quarter

- (14:55) OSU – Jelani Thurman 4-yard pass from Lincoln Kienholz, Jackson Courville kick (Drive: 8 plays, 53 yards, 4:24; Ohio State 63–0)
- (0:31) OSU – Sam Dixon 1-yard run, Jackson Courville kick (Drive: 9 plays, 84 yards, 4:46; Ohio State 70–0)

Statistics	GRAM	OSU
First downs	10	32
Plays–yards	55–166	66–651
Rushes–yards	33–94	38–274
Passing yards	72	377
Passing: comp–att–int	11–22–1	24–28–1
Turnovers	3	1
Time of possession	29:05	30:55

Team	Category	Player	Statistics
Grambling State	Passing	C'zavian Teasett	9/15, 55 yards, INT
Grambling State	Rushing	Andre Crews	5 carries, 38 yards
Grambling State	Receiving	Keith Jones Jr.	2 receptions, 19 yards
Ohio State	Passing	Julian Sayin	18/19, 306 yards, 4 TD, INT
Ohio State	Rushing	Bo Jackson	9 carries, 108 yards, TD
Ohio State	Receiving	Jeremiah Smith	5 receptions, 119 yards, 2 TD

=== Ohio ===
Ohio Bobcats (1–1) at No. 1 Ohio State Buckeyes (2–0) – Game summary

Quarter	1	2	3	4	Total
Bobcats	0	3	6	0	9
No. 1 Buckeyes	3	10	10	14	37

at Ohio Stadium • Columbus, Ohio

- Date: September 13
- Game time: 7:00 p.m.
- Game weather: Clear • Temperature: 77 °F (25 °C) • Wind: SW at 5 miles per hour (8.0 km/h)
- Game attendance: 105,765
- Referee: Bryan Banks
- TV announcers (Peacock): Paul Burmeister (play-by-play), Chris Simms (analyst), and Zora Stephenson (sideline reporter)
- Box score, Recap

Game information

First quarter

- (1:54) OSU – Jayden Fielding 38-yard field goal (Drive: 10 plays, 52 yards, 6:19; Ohio State 3–0)

Second quarter

- (9:58) OSU – Jayden Fielding 20-yard field goal (Drive: 11 plays, 63 yards, 5:17; Ohio State 6–0)
- (2:29) OSU – Max Klare 16-yard pass from Julian Sayin, Jayden Fielding kick (Drive: 8 plays, 77 yards, 3:36; Ohio State 13–0)
- (0:24) OHIO – Brack Peacock 44-yard field goal (Drive: 5 plays, 14 yards, 0:56; Ohio State 13–3)

Third quarter

- (14:07) OHIO – Chase Hendricks 57-yard pass from Parker Navarro, kick failed (Drive: 2 plays, 75 yards, 0:53; Ohio State 13–9)
- (11:19) OSU – Jayden Fielding 22-yard field goal (Drive: 5 plays, 71 yards, 2:48; Ohio State 16–9)
- (6:16) OSU – Jeremiah Smith 47-yard pass from Julian Sayin, Jayden Fielding kick (Drive: 4 plays, 59 yards, 1:58; Ohio State 23–9)

Fourth quarter

- (14:14) OSU – Carnell Tate 49-yard pass from Julian Sayin, Jayden Fielding kick (Drive: 8 plays, 85 yards, 3:49; Ohio State 30–9)
- (6:36) OSU – Jeremiah Smith 17-yard run, Jayden Fielding kick (Drive: 5 plays, 59 yards, 2:53; Ohio State 37–9)

Statistics	OHIO	OSU
First downs	9	28
Plays–yards	55–181	63–572
Rushes–yards	34–68	31–225
Passing yards	113	347
Passing: comp–att–int	10–21–0	25–32–2
Turnovers	1	2
Time of possession	27:17	32:43

Team	Category	Player	Statistics
Ohio	Passing	Parker Navarro	6/13, 94 yards, TD
Ohio	Rushing	Sieh Bangura	12 carries, 24 yards
Ohio	Receiving	Chase Hendricks	3 receptions, 76 yards, TD
Ohio State	Passing	Julian Sayin	25/32, 347 yards, 3 TD, 2 INT
Ohio State	Rushing	Bo Jackson	9 carries, 109 yards
Ohio State	Receiving	Jeremiah Smith	9 receptions, 153 yards, TD

=== at Washington ===
No. 1 Ohio State Buckeyes (3–0) at Washington Huskies (3–0) – Game summary

Quarter	1	2	3	4	Total
No. 1 Buckeyes	0	7	7	10	24
Huskies	0	3	3	0	6

at Husky Stadium • Seattle, Washington

- Date: September 27
- Game time: 3:30 p.m.
- Game weather: Sunny • Temperature: 69 °F (21 °C) • Wind: W at 5 miles per hour (8.0 km/h)
- Game attendance: 72,485
- Referee: Chris Coyte
- TV announcers (CBS): Brad Nessler (play-by-play), Gary Danielson (analyst), and Jenny Dell (sideline reporter)
- Box score, Recap

Game information

First quarter

- No scoring plays

Second quarter

- (14:05) WASH – Grady Gross 28-yard field goal (Drive: 10 plays, 69 yards, 5:55; Washington 3–0)
- (1:08) OSU – Jeremiah Smith 18-yard pass from Julian Sayin, Jayden Fielding kick (Drive: 10 plays, 73 yards, 3:31; Ohio State 7–3)

Third quarter

- (7:19) OSU – CJ Donaldson 1-yard run, Jayden Fielding kick (Drive: 14 plays, 75 yards, 7:41; Ohio State 14–3)
- (3:49) WASH – Grady Gross 28-yard field goal (Drive: 8 plays, 65 yards, 3:30; Ohio State 14–6)

Fourth quarter

- (13:19) OSU – Jayden Fielding 34-yard field goal (Drive: 11 plays, 59 yards, 5:30; Ohio State 17–6)
- (4:56) OSU – CJ Donaldson 4-yard pass from Julian Sayin, Jayden Fielding kick (Drive: 8 plays, 44 yards, 3:48; Ohio State 24–6)

Statistics	OSU	WASH
First downs	23	15
Plays–yards	62–357	53–234
Rushes–yards	34–149	30–61
Passing yards	208	173
Passing: comp–att–int	22–28–0	18–23–0
Turnovers	1	0
Time of possession	31:55	28:05

Team	Category	Player	Statistics
Ohio State	Passing	Julian Sayin	22/28, 208 yards, 2 TD
Ohio State	Rushing	Bo Jackson	17 carries, 80 yards
Ohio State	Receiving	Jeremiah Smith	8 receptions, 81 yards, TD
Washington	Passing	Demond Williams Jr.	18/22, 173 yards
Washington	Rushing	Jonah Coleman	13 carries, 70 yards
Washington	Receiving	Dezmen Roebuck	4 receptions, 58 yards

=== Minnesota ===
Minnesota Golden Gophers (3–1) at No. 1 Ohio State Buckeyes (4–0) – Game summary

Quarter	1	2	3	4	Total
Golden Gophers	3	0	0	0	3
No. 1 Buckeyes	7	14	7	14	42

at Ohio Stadium • Columbus, Ohio

- Date: October 4
- Game time: 7:30 p.m.
- Game weather: Clear • Temperature: 77 °F (25 °C) • Wind: S at 4 miles per hour (6.4 km/h)
- Game attendance: 105,114
- Referee: Mark Kluczynski
- TV announcers (NBC): Noah Eagle (play-by-play), Todd Blackledge (analyst), and Kathryn Tappen (sideline reporter)
- Box score, Recap

Game information

First quarter

- (8:05) MINN – Brady Denaburg 27-yard field goal (Drive: 13 plays, 66 yards, 6:55; Minnesota 3–0)
- (0:00) OSU – CJ Donaldson 1-yard run, Jayden Fielding kick (Drive: 7 plays, 91 yards, 3:41; Ohio State 7–3)

Second quarter

- (11:01) OSU – Jeremiah Smith 6-yard pass from Julian Sayin, Jayden Fielding kick (Drive: 8 plays, 80 yards, 2:56; Ohio State 14–3)
- (8:04) OSU – Carnell Tate 44-yard pass from Julian Sayin, Jayden Fielding kick (Drive: 1 play, 44 yards, 0:08; Ohio State 21–3)

Third quarter

- (5:45) OSU – Bo Jackson 5-yard run, Jayden Fielding kick (Drive: 3 plays, 20 yards, 1:46; Ohio State 28–3)

Fourth quarter

- (14:55) OSU – Jeremiah Smith 9-yard pass from Julian Sayin, Jayden Fielding kick (Drive: 9 plays, 72 yards, 4:14; Ohio State 35–3)
- (3:49) OSU – Lincoln Kienholz 1-yard run, Jayden Fielding kick (Drive: 9 plays, 77 yards, 5:37; Ohio State 42–3)

Statistics	MINN	OSU
First downs	11	21
Plays–yards	51–162	58–474
Rushes–yards	25–68	30–133
Passing yards	94	341
Passing: comp–att–int	15–26–0	24–28–0
Turnovers	0	0
Time of possession	28:08	31:52

Team	Category	Player	Statistics
Minnesota	Passing	Drake Lindsey	15/26, 94 yards
Minnesota	Rushing	Fame Ijeboi	13 carries, 52 yards
Minnesota	Receiving	Jameson Geers	1 reception, 25 yards
Ohio State	Passing	Julian Sayin	23/27, 326 yards, 3 TD
Ohio State	Rushing	Bo Jackson	13 carries, 63 yards, TD
Ohio State	Receiving	Carnell Tate	9 receptions, 183 yards, TD

=== at No. 17 Illinois (Illibuck) ===
No. 1 Ohio State Buckeyes (5–0) at No. 17 Illinois Fighting Illini (5–1) – Game summary

Quarter	1	2	3	4	Total
No. 1 Buckeyes	10	10	7	7	34
No. 17 Fighting Illini	0	3	7	6	16

at Gies Memorial Stadium • Champaign, Illinois

- Date: October 11
- Game time: 12:00 p.m.
- Game weather: Sunny • Temperature: 67 °F (19 °C) • Wind: NE at 10 miles per hour (16 km/h)
- Game attendance: 60,670
- Referee: Tim O'Dey
- TV announcers (FOX): Gus Johnson (play-by-play), Joel Klatt (analyst), and Jenny Taft (sideline reporter)
- Box score, Recap

Game information

First quarter

- (9:35) OSU – Jayden Fielding 26-yard field goal (Drive: 12 plays, 67 yards, 5:25; Ohio State 3–0)
- (3:40) OSU – CJ Donaldson 1-yard run, Jayden Fielding kick (Drive: 6 plays, 35 yards, 3:15; Ohio State 10–0)

Second quarter

- (6:43) OSU – Jayden Fielding 31-yard field goal (Drive: 6 plays, 25 yards, 2:39; Ohio State 13–0)
- (3:48) OSU – Bo Jackson 17-yard pass from Julian Sayin, Jayden Fielding kick (Drive: 5 plays, 26 yards, 2:50; Ohio State 20–0)
- (1:05) ILL – David Olano 24-yard field goal (Drive: 11 plays, 69 yards, 2:43; Ohio State 20–3)

Third quarter

- (10:06) ILL – Aidan Laughery 1-yard run, David Olano kick (Drive: 12 plays, 75 yards, 4:54; Ohio State 20–10)
- (2:08) OSU – CJ Donaldson 2-yard run, Jayden Fielding kick (Drive: 14 plays, 63 yards, 7:52; Ohio State 27–10)

Fourth quarter

- (13:25) OSU – Jeremiah Smith 2-yard pass from Julian Sayin, Jayden Fielding kick (Drive: 7 plays, 24 yards, 3:08; Ohio State 34–10)
- (4:25) ILL – Collin Dixon 4-yard pass from Luke Altmyer, pass failed (Drive: 9 plays, 61 yards, 4:07; Ohio State 34–16)

Statistics	OSU	ILL
First downs	17	22
Plays–yards	64–272	71–295
Rushes–yards	37-106	27–47
Passing yards	166	248
Passing: comp–att–int	19–27–0	30–44–1
Turnovers	0	3
Time of possession	33:11	26:49

Team	Category	Player	Statistics
Ohio State	Passing	Julian Sayin	19/27, 166 yards, 2 TD
Ohio State	Rushing	Bo Jackson	10 carries, 47 yards
Ohio State	Receiving	Jeremiah Smith	5 receptions, 42 yards, TD
Illinois	Passing	Luke Altmyer	30/44, 248 yards, TD, INT
Illinois	Rushing	Aidan Laughery	8 carries, 50 yards, TD
Illinois	Receiving	Cole Rusk	5 receptions, 68 yards

=== at Wisconsin ===
No. 1 Ohio State Buckeyes (6–0) at Wisconsin Badgers (2–4) – Game summary

Quarter	1	2	3	4	Total
No. 1 Buckeyes	17	0	10	7	34
Badgers	0	0	0	0	0

at Camp Randall Stadium • Madison, Wisconsin

- Date: October 18
- Game time: 3:30 p.m.
- Game weather: Sunny • Temperature: 72 °F (22 °C) • Wind: SW at 10 miles per hour (16 km/h)
- Game attendance: 72,795
- Referee: Jeff Servinski
- TV announcers (CBS): Brad Nessler (play-by-play), Gary Danielson (analyst), and Jenny Dell (sideline reporter)
- Box score, Recap

Game information

First quarter

- (8:25) OSU – Carnell Tate 33-yard pass from Julian Sayin, Jayden Fielding kick (Drive: 9 plays, 89 yards, 4:34; Ohio State 7–0)
- (4:40) OSU – Jayden Fielding 38-yard field goal (Drive: 6 plays, 23 yards, 2:30; Ohio State 10–0)
- (0:04) OSU – Carnell Tate 10-yard pass from Julian Sayin, Jayden Fielding kick (Drive: 6 plays, 70 yards, 2:41; Ohio State 17–0)

Second quarter

- No scoring plays.

Third quarter

- (8:42) OSU – Jayden Fielding 37-yard field goal (Drive: 11 plays, 57 yards, 6:18; Ohio State 20–0)
- (1:15) OSU – Will Kacmarek 2-yard pass from Julian Sayin, Jayden Fielding kick (Drive: 13 plays, 83 yards, 6:21; Ohio State 27–0)

Fourth quarter

- (5:35) OSU – Brandon Inniss 13-yard pass from Julian Sayin, Jayden Fielding kick (Drive: 11 plays, 77 yards, 5:32; Ohio State 34–0)

Statistics	OSU	WIS
First downs	26	9
Plays–yards	70–491	46–144
Rushes–yards	28–98	31–95
Passing yards	393	49
Passing: comp–att–int	36–42–0	7–15–1
Turnovers	0	1
Time of possession	33:57	26:03

Team	Category	Player	Statistics
Ohio State	Passing	Julian Sayin	36/42, 393 yards, 4 TD
Ohio State	Rushing	Isaiah West	9 carries, 55 yards
Ohio State	Receiving	Carnell Tate	6 receptions, 111 yards, 2 TD
Wisconsin	Passing	Hunter Simmons	6/12, 54 yards, INT
Wisconsin	Rushing	Gideon Ituka	4 carries, 35 yards
Wisconsin	Receiving	Lance Mason	2 receptions, 31 yards

=== Penn State (rivalry) ===
Penn State Nittany Lions (3–4) at No. 1 Ohio State Buckeyes (7–0) – Game summary

Quarter	1	2	3	4	Total
Nittany Lions	0	14	0	0	14
No. 1 Buckeyes	7	10	14	7	38

at Ohio Stadium • Columbus, Ohio

- Date: November 1
- Game time: 12:00 p.m.
- Game weather: Cloudy • Temperature: 51 °F (11 °C) • Wind: N at 5 miles per hour (8.0 km/h)
- Game attendance: 105,517
- Referee: Gregory Blum
- TV announcers (FOX): Gus Johnson (play-by-play), Joel Klatt (analyst), and Jenny Taft (sideline reporter)
- Box score, Recap

Game information

First quarter

- (6:15) OSU – Jeremiah Smith 14-yard pass from Julian Sayin, Jayden Fielding kick (Drive: 11 plays, 89 yards, 6:10; Ohio State 7–0)

Second quarter

- (14:08) OSU – Jayden Fielding 22-yard field goal (Drive: 11 plays, 71 yards, 5:33; Ohio State 10–0)
- (6:18) PSU – Nicholas Singleton 3-yard run, Ryan Barker kick (Drive: 15 plays, 75 yards, 7:50; Ohio State 10–7)
- (3:41) OSU – Carnell Tate 45-yard pass from Julian Sayin, Jayden Fielding kick (Drive: 6 plays, 75 yards, 2:37; Ohio State 17–7)
- (0:20) PSU – Kaytron Allen 1-yard run, Ryan Barker kick (Drive: 4 plays, 13 yards, 1:28; Ohio State 17–14)

Third quarter

- (12:18) OSU – CJ Donaldson 1-yard run, Jayden Fielding kick (Drive: 5 plays, 75 yards, 2:42; Ohio State 24–14)
- (3:21) OSU – Bennett Christian 1-yard pass from Julian Sayin, Jayden Fielding kick (Drive: 7 plays, 84 yards, 4:31; Ohio State 31–14)

Fourth quarter

- (9:43) OSU – Jeremiah Smith 11-yard pass from Julian Sayin, Jayden Fielding kick (Drive: 2 plays, 62 yards, 0:56; Ohio State 38–14)

Statistics	PSU	OSU
First downs	15	22
Plays–yards	60–200	55–480
Rushes–yards	31–55	32–164
Passing yards	145	316
Passing: comp–att–int	19–29–1	20–23–0
Turnovers	1	1
Time of possession	29:53	30:07

Team	Category	Player	Statistics
Penn State	Passing	Ethan Grunkemeyer	19/28, 145 yards, INT
Penn State	Rushing	Kaytron Allen	21 carries, 76 yards, TD
Penn State	Receiving	Nicholas Singleton	3 receptions, 28 yards
Ohio State	Passing	Julian Sayin	20/23, 316 yards, 4 TD
Ohio State	Rushing	Bo Jackson	13 carries, 105 yards
Ohio State	Receiving	Carnell Tate	5 receptions, 124 yards, TD

=== at Purdue ===
No. 1 Ohio State Buckeyes (8–0) at Purdue Boilermakers (2–7) – Game summary

Quarter	1	2	3	4	Total
No. 1 Buckeyes	0	24	0	10	34
Boilermakers	3	0	0	7	10

at Ross–Ade Stadium • West Lafayette, Indiana

- Date: November 8
- Game time: 1:00 p.m.
- Game weather: Cloudy • Temperature: 52 °F (11 °C) • Wind: NW at 5 miles per hour (8.0 km/h)
- Game attendance: 57,701
- Referee: Jason Nickleby
- TV announcers (BTN): Jeff Levering (play-by-play), Jake Butt (analyst), and Brooke Fletcher (sideline reporter)
- Box score, Recap

Game information

First quarter

- (4:23) PUR – Spencer Porath 40-yard field goal (Drive: 12 plays, 70 yards, 5:29; Purdue 3–0)

Second quarter

- (14:16) OSU – CJ Donaldson 1-yard run, Jayden Fielding kick (Drive: 9 plays, 75 yards, 5:07; Ohio State 7–3)
- (7:18) OSU – Jeremiah Smith 35-yard pass from Julian Sayin, Jayden Fielding kick (Drive: 10 plays, 89 yards, 5:44; Ohio State 14–3)
- (1:12) OSU – Lincoln Kienholz 3-yard run, Jayden Fielding kick (Drive: 9 plays, 30 yards, 5:21; Ohio State 21–3)
- (0:03) OSU – Jayden Fielding 49-yard field goal (Drive: 7 plays, 45 yards, 0:44; Ohio State 24–3)

Third quarter

- No scoring plays

Fourth quarter

- (12:41) OSU – Jayden Fielding 45-yard field goal (Drive: 11 plays, 58 yards, 6:09; Ohio State 27–3)
- (6:19) OSU – CJ Donaldson 1-yard run, Jayden Fielding kick (Drive: 9 plays, 65 yards, 5:22; Ohio State 34–3)
- (1:45) PUR – Jesse Watson 7-yard pass from Malachi Singleton, Spencer Porath kick (Drive: 10 plays, 75 yards, 4:34; Ohio State 34–10)

Statistics	OSU	PUR
First downs	30	13
Plays–yards	76–473	44–186
Rushes–yards	43–170	22–92
Passing yards	303	94
Passing: comp–att–int	27–33–1	13–22–1
Turnovers	1	1
Time of possession	40:53	19:07

Team	Category	Player	Statistics
Ohio State	Passing	Julian Sayin	27/33, 303 yards, TD, INT
Ohio State	Rushing	Bo Jackson	14 carries, 75 yards
Ohio State	Receiving	Jeremiah Smith	10 receptions, 137 yards, TD
Purdue	Passing	Ryan Browne	10/19, 76 yards, INT
Purdue	Rushing	Antonio Harris	13 carries, 45 yards
Purdue	Receiving	Rico Walker	1 reception, 30 yards

=== UCLA ===
UCLA Bruins (3–6) at No. 1 Ohio State Buckeyes (9–0) – Game summary

Quarter	1	2	3	4	Total
Bruins	0	0	7	3	10
No. 1 Buckeyes	10	17	14	7	48

at Ohio Stadium • Columbus, Ohio

- Date: November 15
- Game time: 7:30 p.m.
- Game weather: Cloudy • Temperature: 62 °F (17 °C) • Wind: SW at 15 miles per hour (24 km/h)
- Game attendance: 104,168
- Referee: Ron Snodgrass
- TV announcers (NBC): Noah Eagle (play-by-play), Todd Blackledge (analyst), and Kathryn Tappen (sideline reporter)
- Box score, Recap

Game information

First quarter

- (8:47) OSU – Bo Jackson 1-yard run, Jayden Fielding kick (Drive: 8 plays, 71 yards, 3:54; Ohio State 7–0)
- (0:04) OSU – Jayden Fielding 41-yard field goal (Drive: 11 plays, 60 yards, 5:41; Ohio State 10–0)

Second quarter

- (4:41) OSU – Bryson Rodgers 11-yard pass from Julian Sayin, Jayden Fielding kick (Drive: 12 plays, 82 yards, 6:51; Ohio State 17–0)
- (1:19) OSU – James Peoples 19-yard run, Jayden Fielding kick (Drive: 5 plays, 81 yards, 1:53; Ohio State 24–0)
- (0:01) OSU – Jayden Fielding 33-yard field goal (Drive: 2 plays, 0 yards, 0:09; Ohio State 27–0)

Third quarter

- (2:27) OSU – Isaiah West 1-yard run, Jayden Fielding kick (Drive: 13 plays, 69 yards, 6:16; Ohio State 34–0)
- (0:17) UCLA – Kwazi Gilmer 18-yard pass from Luke Duncan, Mateen Bhaghani kick (Drive: 5 plays, 75 yards, 2:10; Ohio State 34–7)
- (0:03) OSU – Lorenzo Styles Jr. 100-yard kickoff return, Jayden Fielding kick (Ohio State 41–7)

Fourth quarter

- (8:49) UCLA – Mateen Bhaghani 32-yard field goal (Drive: 12 plays, 61 yards, 6:14; Ohio State 41–10)
- (1:54) OSU – James Peoples 8-yard run, Jayden Fielding kick (Drive: 11 plays, 75 yards, 6:55; Ohio State 48–10)

Statistics	UCLA	OSU
First downs	8	25
Plays–yards	48–222	67–440
Rushes–yards	25–68	33–222
Passing yards	154	218
Passing: comp–att–int	16–23–0	26–34–0
Turnovers	0	0
Time of possession	25:01	34:59

Team	Category	Player	Statistics
UCLA	Passing	Luke Duncan	16/23, 154 yards, TD
UCLA	Rushing	Anthony Woods	5 carries, 20 yards
UCLA	Receiving	Rico Flores Jr.	2 receptions, 59 yards
Ohio State	Passing	Julian Sayin	23/31, 184 yards, TD
Ohio State	Rushing	Bo Jackson	15 carries, 112 yards, TD
Ohio State	Receiving	Jeremiah Smith	4 receptions, 40 yards

=== Rutgers ===
Rutgers Scarlet Knights (5–5) at No. 1 Ohio State Buckeyes (10–0) – Game summary

Quarter	1	2	3	4	Total
Scarlet Knights	0	3	0	6	9
No. 1 Buckeyes	7	7	14	14	42

at Ohio Stadium • Columbus, Ohio

- Date: November 22
- Game time: 12:00 p.m.
- Game weather: Sunny • Temperature: 48 °F (9 °C) • Wind: N at 9 miles per hour (14 km/h)
- Game attendance: 100,023
- Referee: Chris Coyte
- TV announcers (FOX): Gus Johnson (play-by-play), Joel Klatt (analyst), and Jenny Taft (sideline reporter)
- Box score, Recap

Game information

First quarter

- (4:01) OSU – Bo Jackson 15-yard run, Jayden Fielding kick (Drive: 3 plays, 29 yards, 1:46; Ohio State 7–0)

Second quarter

- (11:50) RUTG – Jai Patel 44-yard field goal (Drive: 15 plays, 49 yards, 7:11; Ohio State 7–3)
- (2:27) OSU – Brandon Inniss 7-yard pass from Julian Sayin, Jayden Fielding kick (Drive: 11 plays, 98 yards, 6:50; Ohio State 14–3)

Third quarter

- (7:00) OSU – Max Klare 11-yard pass from Julian Sayin, Jayden Fielding kick (Drive: 3 plays, 1 yard, 0:40; Ohio State 21–3)
- (2:30) OSU – Bo Jackson 10-yard run, Jayden Fielding kick (Drive: 7 plays, 70 yards, 3:36; Ohio State 28–3)

Fourth quarter

- (11:39) OSU – CJ Donaldson 5-yard run, Jayden Fielding kick (Drive: 7 plays, 70 yards, 4:18; Ohio State 35–3)
- (6:43) RUTG – Antwan Raymond 1-yard run, pass failed (Drive: 8 plays, 71 yards, 4:51; Ohio State 35–9)
- (4:17) OSU – James Peoples 49-yard run, Jayden Fielding kick (Drive: 4 plays, 75 yards, 2:26; Ohio State 42–9)

Statistics	RUTG	OSU
First downs	12	25
Plays–yards	55–147	60–430
Rushes–yards	35–66	38–254
Passing yards	81	176
Passing: comp–att–int	10–20–0	14–22–0
Turnovers	1	1
Time of possession	27:11	32:49

Team	Category	Player	Statistics
Rutgers	Passing	Athan Kaliakmanis	10/20, 81 yards
Rutgers	Rushing	Antwan Raymond	15 carries, 52 yards, TD
Rutgers	Receiving	KJ Duff	2 receptions, 34 yards
Ohio State	Passing	Julian Sayin	13/19, 157 yards, 2 TD
Ohio State	Rushing	Bo Jackson	19 carries, 110 yards, 2 TD
Ohio State	Receiving	Max Klare	7 receptions, 105 yards, TD

=== at No. 15 Michigan (rivalry) ===
No. 1 Ohio State Buckeyes (11–0) at No. 15 Michigan Wolverines (9–2) – Game summary

Quarter	1	2	3	4	Total
No. 1 Buckeyes	3	14	7	3	27
No. 15 Wolverines	6	3	0	0	9

at Michigan Stadium • Ann Arbor, Michigan

- Date: November 29
- Game time: 12:00 p.m.
- Game weather: Snow • Temperature: 29 °F (−2 °C) • Wind: SE at 8 miles per hour (13 km/h)
- Game attendance: 111,373
- Referee: Kole Knueppel
- TV announcers (FOX): Gus Johnson (play-by-play), Joel Klatt (analyst), Jenny Taft, and Tom Rinaldi (sideline reporters)
- Box score, Recap

Game information

First quarter

- (12:37) MICH – Dominic Zvada 45-yard field goal (Drive: 6 plays, 48 yards, 2:23; Michigan 3–0)
- (9:42) MICH – Dominic Zvada 25-yard field goal (Drive: 6 plays, 32 yards, 2:40; Michigan 6–0)
- (4:33) OSU – Jayden Fielding 24-yard field goal (Drive: 11 plays, 69 yards, 5:09; Michigan 6–3)

Second quarter

- (11:44) OSU – Jeremiah Smith 35-yard pass from Julian Sayin, Jayden Fielding kick (Drive: 10 plays, 63 yards, 5:49; Ohio State 10–6)
- (5:24) MICH – Dominic Zvada 49-yard field goal (Drive: 11 plays, 54 yards, 6:17; Ohio State 10–9)
- (0:16) OSU – Brandon Inniss 4-yard pass from Julian Sayin, Jayden Fielding kick (Drive: 11 plays, 87 yards, 5:08; Ohio State 17–9)

Third quarter

- (7:35) OSU – Carnell Tate 50-yard pass from Julian Sayin, Jayden Fielding kick (Drive: 2 plays, 57 yards, 0:45; Ohio State 24–9)

Fourth quarter

- (8:10) OSU – Jayden Fielding 23-yard field goal (Drive: 20 plays, 81 yards, 11:56; Ohio State 27–9)

Statistics	OSU	MICH
First downs	22	9
Plays–yards	73–419	42–163
Rushes–yards	47–186	24–100
Passing yards	233	63
Passing: comp–att–int	19–26–1	8–18–1
Turnovers	1	1
Time of possession	40:01	19:59

Team	Category	Player	Statistics
Ohio State	Passing	Julian Sayin	19/26, 233 yards, 3 TD, INT
Ohio State	Rushing	Bo Jackson	22 carries, 117 yards
Ohio State	Receiving	Carnell Tate	5 receptions, 82 yards, TD
Michigan	Passing	Bryce Underwood	8/18, 63 yards, INT
Michigan	Rushing	Jordan Marshall	7 carries, 61 yards
Michigan	Receiving	Donaven McCulley	3 receptions, 46 yards

=== vs. No. 2 Indiana (Big Ten Championship Game) ===
2025 Big Ten Championship Game
No. 2 Indiana Hoosiers (12–0) vs. No. 1 Ohio State Buckeyes (12–0) – Game summary

Quarter	1	2	3	4	Total
No. 2 Hoosiers	3	3	7	0	13
No. 1 Buckeyes	7	3	0	0	10

at Lucas Oil Stadium • Indianapolis, Indiana

- Date: December 6
- Game time: 8:00 p.m.
- Game weather: None (indoor stadium)
- Game attendance: 68,214
- Referee: Ron Snodgrass
- TV announcers (FOX): Gus Johnson (play-by-play), Joel Klatt (analyst), Jenny Taft, and Tom Rinaldi (sideline reporters)
- Box score, Recap

Game information

First quarter

- IU – Nicolas Radicic 29-yard field goal, 6:55. Hoosiers 3–0. Drive: 6 plays, 12 yards, 2:02.
- OSU – Carnell Tate 9-yard pass from Julian Sayin (Jayden Fielding kick), 0:53. Buckeyes 7–3. Drive: 5 plays, 25 yards, 0:55.

Second quarter

- OSU – Jayden Fielding 30-yard field goal, 10:12. Buckeyes 10–3. Drive: 6 plays, 67 yards, 3:23.
- IU – Nicolas Radicic 32-yard field goal, 2:50. Buckeyes 10–6. Drive: 15 plays, 61 yards, 7:18.

Third quarter

- IU – Elijah Sarratt 17-yard pass from Fernando Mendoza (Nicolas Radicic kick), 8:07. Hoosiers 13–10. Drive: 7 plays, 88 yards, 3:30.

Fourth quarter

- No scoring plays.

Statistics	IU	OSU
First downs	17	17
Plays–yards	57–340	56–322
Rushes–yards	34–118	26–58
Passing yards	222	264
Passing: comp–att–int	15–23–1	22–30–1
Turnovers	1	1
Time of possession	29:47	30:13

Team	Category	Player	Statistics
Indiana	Passing	Fernando Mendoza	15/23, 222 yards, TD, INT
Indiana	Rushing	Kaelon Black	16 carries, 69 yards
Indiana	Receiving	Charlie Becker	6 receptions, 126 yards
Ohio State	Passing	Julian Sayin	21/29, 258 yards, TD, INT
Ohio State	Rushing	Bo Jackson	17 carries, 83 yards
Ohio State	Receiving	Jeremiah Smith	8 receptions, 144 yards

=== vs. No. 10 Miami (Cotton Bowl Classic / CFP Quarterfinal) ===
2025 Cotton Bowl Classic (December)
No. 10 Miami Hurricanes (11–2) vs. No. 2 Ohio State Buckeyes (12–1) – Game summary

Quarter	1	2	3	4	Total
No. 10 Hurricanes	0	14	3	7	24
No. 2 Buckeyes	0	0	7	7	14

at AT&T Stadium • Arlington, Texas

- Date: December 31
- Game time: 7:30 p.m.
- Game weather: None (indoor stadium)
- Game attendance: 71,323
- Referee: Daniel Gautreaux
- TV announcers (ESPN): Dave Pasch (play by play), Dusty Dvoracek (analyst), Taylor McGregor (sideline reporter), and Quint Kessenich (sideline reporter)

Game information

First quarter

- No scoring plays

Second quarter

- (13:31) MIA – Mark Fletcher Jr. 9-yard pass from Carson Beck, Carter Davis kick (Drive: 13 plays, 83 yards, 8:04; Miami 7–0)
- (11:29) MIA – Keionte Scott 72-yard interception return, Carter Davis kick (Miami 14–0)

Third quarter

- (8:10) OSU – Bo Jackson 1-yard run, Jayden Fielding kick (Drive: 11 plays, 82 yards, 6:44; Miami 14–7)
- (3:01) MIA – Carter Davis 49-yard field goal (Drive: 9 plays, 43 yards, 5:04; Miami 17–7)

Fourth quarter

- (13:28) OSU – Jeremiah Smith 14-yard pass from Julian Sayin, Jayden Fielding kick (Drive: 10 plays, 75 yards, 4:33; Miami 17–14)
- (0:55) MIA – CharMar Brown 5-yard run, Carter Davis kick (Drive: 10 plays, 70 yards, 5:01; Miami 24–14)

Statistics	MIA	OSU
First downs	18	18
Plays–yards	63–291	59–332
Rushes–yards	37–153	24–45
Passing yards	138	287
Passing: comp–att–int	19–26–0	22–35–2
Turnovers	1	2
Time of possession	33:20	26:40

Team	Category	Player	Statistics
Miami	Passing	Carson Beck	19/26, 138 yards, TD
Miami	Rushing	Mark Fletcher Jr.	19 carries, 90 yards
Miami	Receiving	CJ Daniels	5 receptions, 49 yards
Ohio State	Passing	Julian Sayin	22/35, 287 yards, TD, 2 INT
Ohio State	Rushing	Bo Jackson	11 carries, 55 yards, TD
Ohio State	Receiving	Jeremiah Smith	7 receptions, 157 yards, TD

== Personnel ==
=== Roster ===
2025 Ohio State Buckeyes football team roster
Players
Coaches
Offense

Pos.	#	Name	Class
WR	1	Brandon Inniss (C)	Jr
QB	3	Lincoln Kienholz	Jr
WR	4	Jeremiah Smith	So
WR	5	Mylan Graham	So
QB	6	Eli Brickhandler	GS
WR	7	Phillip Bell	Fr
WR	8	De'Zie Jones	Fr
QB	9	Tavien St. Clair	Fr
QB	10	Julian Sayin	So
WR	11	Quincy Porter	Fr
RB	12	CJ Donaldson	Sr
WR	13	Bryson Rodgers	Jr
QB	14	Trey Robinette	Fr
TE	15	Jelani Thurman	Jr
QB	16	Mason Maggs	Sr
WR	17	Carnell Tate	Jr
WR	18	Bodpegn Miller	Fr
RB	20	James Peoples	So
RB	21	Anthony "Turbo" Rogers	Fr
WR	23	Nolan Baudo	Jr
RB	24	Sam Dixon	So
RB	25	Bo Jackson	Fr
QB	26	Kolton Stover	Fr
RB	28	Stanley Jackson Jr.	So
WR	30	Preston Wolfe	So
RB	32	Isaiah West	Fr
WR	34	Brennen Schramm	Jr
OL	51	Luke Montgomery	Jr
OL	56	Isaiah Kema	Fr
OL	57	Ian Gecse	Jr
OL	58	Gabe VanSickle	So
OL	62	Joshua Padilla	Jr
OL	63	Julian Goines-Jackson	Sr
OL	64	Simon Lorentz	So
OL	65	Justin Terry	So
OL	67	Austin Siereveld (C)	Jr
OL	69	Ian Moore	So
OL	70	Phillip Daniels	Jr
OL	71	Jayvon McFadden	Fr
OL	72	Deontae Armstrong	So
OL	73	Devontae Armstrong	So
OL	74	Carter Lowe	Fr
OL	75	Carson Hinzman	Sr
OL	76	Jake Cook	Fr
OL	77	Tegra Tshabola	Sr
OT	78	Ethan Onianwa	Sr
WR	80	Shawn Lodge	Sr
WR	81	Damarion Witten	So
WR	82	David Adolph	Sr
TE	83	Nate Roberts	Fr
WR	84	Dorian Williams	So
TE	85	Bennett Christian	Sr
TE	86	Max Klare	Jr
TE	87	Brody Lennon	Fr
TE	88	Maxence LeBlanc	So
TE	89	Will Kacmarek	GS

Defense

Pos.	#	Name	Class
LB	0	Sonny Styles (C)	Sr
CB	1	Davison Igbinosun	Sr
S	2	Caleb Downs (C)	Jr
S	3	Lorenzo Styles Jr.	GS
CB	5	Aaron Scott Jr.	So
CB	6	Devin Sanchez	Fr
CB	7	Jermaine Mathews Jr.	Jr
LB	8	Arvell Reese	Jr
S	9	Malik Hartford	Jr
S	10	Faheem Delane	Fr
LB	11	C. J. Hicks	Sr
CB	12	Bryce West	So
CB	13	Miles Lockhart	So
DL	14	Beau Atkinson	Sr
DL	15	Zion Grady	Fr
DB	16	Keenan Nelson Jr.	Sr
LB	17	Tarvos "TJ" Alford	Fr
S	18	Jaylen McClain	So
CB	19	Jordyn Woods	Fr
LB	20	Riley Pettijohn	Fr
LB	21	Brenten "Inky" Jones	Sr
LB	23	Garrett Stover	So
S	24	Deshawn Stewart	Fr
LB	25	Ty Howard	Sr
LB	26	Payton Pierce	So
S	28	Leroy Roker III	So
DB	29	Glorien Gough	Jr
S	30	Cody Haddad	Fr
S	32	JJ Sebert	So
LB	33	Eli Lee	Fr
CB	34	Buakri Miles Jr.	So
S	35	Jaystin Gwinn	Fr
LB	37	Zach Hayes	So
LB	38	Eli Riggs	So
LB	39	Joey Velazquez	GS
CB	43	Dianté Griffin	Sr
DE	44	Epi Sitanilei	Fr
S	46	Ryan Rudzinski	Jr
DL	48	Logan George	Jr
S	49	Gavin Thobe	Fr
LB	50	Alec DelSignore	Jr
DE	52	Joshua Mickens	Jr
DL	53	Will Smith Jr.	Jr
LB	54	Dylan Furshman	Fr
DE	55	Dominic Kirks	So
DL	59	Ahmed Tounkara	So
DL	88	Trajen Odom	Fr
DL	90	Eric Mensah	So
DL	91	Jarquez Carter	Fr
DE	92	Caden Curry	Sr
DT	93	Maxwell Roy	Fr
DL	94	Jason Moore	Jr
DT	95	Tywone Malone Jr.	GS
DE	96	Eddrick Houston	So
DE	97	Kenyatta Jackson Jr.	Sr
DL	98	Kayden McDonald	Jr

Special teams

Pos.	#	Name	Class
P	19	Nick McLarty	So
LS	35	Collin Johnson	Sr
K	38	Jayden Fielding	Sr
LS	41	Grant Mills	So
P	42	Joe McGuire	Jr
LS	43	John Ferlmann	GS
K	96	Jackson Courville	Jr

Head coach

- Ryan Day

Coordinators/assistant coaches

- Brian Hartline – Offensive coordinator/wide receivers
- Matt Patricia – Defensive coordinator
- Tim Walton – Assistant head coach/co-defensive coordinator/secondary/cornerbacks
- Keenan Bailey – Co-offensive coordinator/tight ends
- Matt Guerrieri – Safeties/pass game coordinator
- Tyler Bowen – Offensive line/run game coordinator
- Larry Johnson – Associate head coach/defensive line
- James Laurinaitis – Linebackers
- Carlos Locklyn – Running backs
- Billy Fessler – Quarterbacks
- Mickey Marotti – Associate AD/director of football sport performance
- Rob Keys – Special teams coordinator
- Sam McGrath – Assistant linebackers
- Michael Hunter – Assistant defensive backs
- Gunner Daniel – Program assistant - special teams
- Devin Jordan – Program assistant - wide receivers
- Joshua Chorba – Program assistant - linebackers
- Tony Johnson – Analyst - running backs
- Charlie Dickey – Program assistant - offensive line
- Marcus Johnson – Assistant offensive line
- Wendy Laurent – Assistant tight ends
- Austin Fields – Quality control - offense
- Tim Hinton – Executive director for football relations/special assistant to the head coach
- Billy Yates – Quality control - defense
- Taver Johnson – Analyst - defensive backs
- Miguel Patrick – Quality control - defense
- Nate Ebner – Quality control - special teams
- Colin Keanu – Program assistant - quarterbacks
- Tony Washington – Program assistant - defensive line
- Tyler Walton – Program assistant - cornerbacks
- Josh Boyer – Quality control - defense

Legend

- (C) Team captain
- (S) Suspended
- (I) Ineligible
- Injured
- Redshirt

Roster
Last update: August 6, 2025

=== Depth chart ===
Defense

S
3 Lorenzo Styles Jr.
12 Bryce West
13 Miles Lockhart

FS
18 Jaylen McClain
28 Leroy Roker III
9 Malik Hartford

WLB	SLB
0 Sonny Styles	8 Arvell Reese
20 Riley Pettijohn	26 Payton Pierce
17 Tarvos "TJ" Alford	23 Garrett Stover

SS
2 Caleb Downs
10 Faheem Delane
16 Keenan Nelson Jr.

CB
1 Davison Igbinosun
5 Aaron Scott Jr.
21 Brenten "Inky" Jones

DE	DT	DT	DE
97 Kenyatta Jackson Jr.	95 Tywone Malone Jr.	98 Kayden McDonald	92 Caden Curry
15 Zion Grady	96 Eddrick Houston	53 Will Smith Jr.	14 Beau Atkinson
11 C. J. Hicks	91 Jarquez Carter	94 Jason Moore	52 Joshua Mickens

CB
7 Jermaine Mathews Jr.
6 Devin Sanchez
19 Jordyn Woods

Offense

WR
4 Jeremiah Smith
5 Mylan Graham
7 Phillip Bell

WR
1 Brandon Inniss
13 Bryson Rodgers
8 De'Zie Jones

LT	LG	C	RG	RT
67 Austin Siereveld	51 Luke Montgomery	75 Carson Hinzman	77 Tegra Tshabola	70 Phillip Daniels
69 Ian Moore	58 Gabe VanSickle	56 Isaiah Kema	78 Ethan Onianwa	65 Justin Terry
74 Carter Lowe	76 Jake Cook	64 Simon Lorentz	62 Joshua Padilla	72 Deontae Armstrong

TE
86 Max Klare
89 Will Kacmarek
85 Bennett Christian

WR
17 Carnell Tate
11 Quincy Porter
82 David Adolph

QB
10 Julian Sayin
3 Lincoln Kienholz
9 Tavien St. Clair

Key reserves
Out (season)
RB 21 Anthony "Turbo" Rogers
RB 24 Sam Dixon
WR 18 Bodpegn Miller
TE 15 Jelani Thurman
TE 83 Nate Roberts
DE 44 Epi Sitanilei
DE 52 Joshua Mickens
DE 55 Dominic Kirks
DT 90 Eric Mensah
DT 93 Maxwell Roy
WLB 25 Ty Howard
CB 43 Dianté Griffin

RB
25 Bo Jackson
32 Isaiah West
20 James Peoples

Special teams
PK 38 Jayden Fielding
PK 96 Jackson Courville
P 42 Joe McGuire
P 19 Nick McLarty
KR 1 Brandon Inniss
PR 1 Brandon Inniss
LS 43 John Ferlmann
H 42 Joe McGuire

As of November 29, 2025. Depth chart

== Statistics ==
=== Team ===
	Ohio State	Opp
Points per game	37.9	7.6
Total	417	84
First downs	157	92
Rushing	170.2	42
Passing	270.1	40
Penalty	3.8	10
Rushing yards	1,062	599
Avg per rush	4.6	2.8
Avg per game	151.7	85.6
Rushing touchdowns	12	1
Passing yards	1,958	919
Att-Comp-Int	163-205-3	108-181-4
Avg per pass	9.6	5.1
Avg per game	279.7	131.3
Passing touchdowns	20	3
Total offense	3,020	1,518
Avg per play	6.9	3.8
Avg per game	431.4	216.9
Fumbles-Lost	3-1	5-5
Penalties-Yards	32-264	29-208
Avg per game	37.0	29.7
Punts-Yards	15-619	37-1,720
Avg per punt	39.7	46.5
Time of possession/Game	32:22	27:37
3rd down conversions	39-74	19-89
3rd Down Pct.	52.7%	21.3%
4th down conversions	6-9	9-20
4th Down Pct.	66.7%	45.0%
Sacks-Yards	21-136	3-16
Touchdowns scored	33	4
Field goals-Attempts	8-10	5-7
PAT-Attempts	33-33	2-3

=== Individual leaders ===
==== Offense ====
Passing statistics
#	NAME	POS	RAT	CMP	ATT	YDS	AVG/G	CMP%	TD	INT	LONG
18	Will Howard	QB	170.2	35	54	520	260.0	64.8%	4	0	70
33	Devin Brown	QB	141.1	6	8	63	31.5	33.3%	0	0	27
10	Julian Sayin	QB	521.2	2	2	61	61.0	100.0%	1	0	55

Rushing statistics
#	NAME	POS	ATT	GAIN	AVG	TD	LONG	AVG/G
1	Quinshon Judkins	RB	22	163	7.4	3	23	81.5
32	TreVeyon Henderson	RB	18	131	7.3	2	21	65.5
20	James Peoples	RB	16	81	5.1	0	12	40.5
24	Sam Williams-Dixon	RB	4	44	11.0	0	31	22.0
18	Will Howard	QB	5	24	4.8	1	19	12.0

Receiving statistics
#	NAME	POS	CTH	YDS	AVG	TD	LONG	AVG/G
4	Jeremiah Smith	WR	11	211	19.2	3	70	105.5
2	Emeka Egbuka	WR	9	149	16.6	0	35	74.5
17	Carnell Tate	WR	7	103	14.7	1	36	51.5
85	Bennett Christian	TE	1	55	55.0	1	55	55.0
11	Brandon Inniss	WR	3	45	15.0	0	27	22.5
13	Bryson Rodgers	WR	2	21	10.5	0	12	10.5

==== Defense ====
Defense statistics

Key: POS: Position, SOLO: Solo Tackles, AST: Assisted Tackles, TOT: Total Tackles, TFL: Tackles-for-loss, SACK: Quarterback Sacks, INT: Interceptions, BU: Passes Broken Up, PD: Passes Defended, QBH: Quarterback Hits, FR: Fumbles Recovered, FF: Forced Fumbles, BLK: Kicks or Punts Blocked, SAF: Safeties, TD : Touchdown

==== Special teams ====
Kicking statistics

Kickoff statistics
#	NAME	POS	KICKS	YDS	AVG	TB	OB

Punting statistics
#	NAME	POS	PUNTS	YDS	AVG	LONG	TB	FC	I–20	50+	BLK

Kick return statistics
#	NAME	POS	RTNS	YDS	AVG	TD	LNG

Punt return statistics
#	NAME	POS	RTNS	YDS	AVG	TD	LONG

== Awards and honors ==
=== Preseason honors ===
Big Ten Preseason Honors
#	Name	Pos	Year
2	Caleb Downs	S	JR
4	Jeremiah Smith	WR	SO
0	Sonny Styles	LB	SR

=== In-season awards ===
==== Weekly Individual Awards ====
Big Ten Weekly Honors
Date	Player	Position	Award
Week 2	Julian Sayin	QB	Freshman of the Week
Week 5	Caden Curry	DE	Defensive Player of the Week
Week 6	Julian Sayin	QB	Freshman of the Week
Week 8	Julian Sayin	QB	Freshman of the Week
Week 8	Julian Sayin	QB	Offensive Player of the Week
Week 10	Julian Sayin	QB	Freshman of the Week
Week 10	Arvell Reese	LB	Defensive Player of the Week
Week 13	Bo Jackson	RB	Freshman of the Week

==== Weekly Individual Awards ====
A list of national awards.

National Weekly Honors
Date	Player	Position	Award
Week 5	Caden Curry	DE	Walter Camp National Player of the Week
Week 5	Caden Curry	DE	Chuck Bednarik Player of the Week
Week 5	Caden Curry	DE	Bronko Nagurski co-National Player of the Week
Week 5	Kayden McDonald	DE	Bronko Nagurski co-National Player of the Week
Week 8	Julian Sayin	QB	Shaun Alexander National Freshman of the Week
Week 10	Arvell Reese	LB	Chuck Bednarik Player of the Week
