= 2025 Big Ten Football Championship Game =

- Conference Championship "Game of the Century"
Indiana Hoosiers	Ohio State Buckeyes
(12–0)	(12–0)
13	10
Head coach: Curt Cignetti	Head coach: Ryan Day
AP / Coaches / CFP; 2 / 2 / 2	AP / Coaches / CFP; 1 / 1 / 1
	1	2	3	4	Total
Indiana	3	3	7	0	13
Ohio State	7	3	0	0	10
- Date: December 6, 2025
- Season: 2025
- Stadium: Lucas Oil Stadium
- Location: Indianapolis, Indiana
- MVP: Fernando Mendoza, QB, Indiana
- Favorite: Ohio State by 4.5
- Referee: Ron Snodgrass

United States TV coverage
- Network: Fox; Compass Media
- Announcers: Gus Johnson (play-by-play), Joel Klatt (analyst), Jenny Taft, and Tom Rinaldi (sideline reporters) (Fox); Gregg Daniels (play-by-play) and Chad Brown (analyst) (Compass Media)

2025 Big Ten Conference football standings
	Conf.			Overall
Team	W		L	W		L
No. 1 Indiana y$#^	9	–	0	16	–	0
No. 5 Ohio State y^	9	–	0	12	–	2
No. 4 Oregon ^	8	–	1	13	–	2
No. 21 Michigan	7	–	2	9	–	4
No. 20 USC	7	–	2	9	–	4
No. 17 Iowa	6	–	3	9	–	4
Illinois	5	–	4	9	–	4
Washington	5	–	4	9	–	4
Minnesota	5	–	4	8	–	5
Nebraska	4	–	5	7	–	6
Northwestern	4	–	5	7	–	6
Penn State	3	–	6	7	–	6
UCLA	3	–	6	3	–	9
Rutgers	2	–	7	5	–	7
Wisconsin	2	–	7	4	–	8
Maryland	1	–	8	4	–	8
Michigan State	1	–	8	4	–	8
Purdue	0	–	9	2	–	10
Championship: Indiana 13, Ohio State 10
# – College Football Playoff champion; ^ – College Football Playoff participant; $ – Conference champion; y – Championship game participant; As of October 11, 2026; Rankings from AP Poll

The 2025 Big Ten Football Championship Game (officially known as the 2025 Discover Big Ten Football Championship Game for sponsorship reasons) was a college football game played on December 6, 2025, at Lucas Oil Stadium in Indianapolis, Indiana. It was the 15th edition of the Big Ten Football Championship Game and determined the champion of the conference for the 2025 season, as well as earning the winner an automatic bid to the 2025 College Football Playoff. The game began at 8:00 p.m. EST on Fox. The Hoosiers upset the Buckeyes to win their first outright Big Ten championship since 1945 and first Big Ten championship overall since 1967.

This game was the first No. 1 vs. No. 2-ranked AP Poll matchup since the 2024 College Football Playoff National Championship, and the first time in a conference championship game since the 2009 SEC Championship Game between Alabama and Florida. It also reached a record-breaking 18.3 million viewers, making it the most-watched conference championship in college football history.

== Teams ==
The Big Ten eliminated divisions for the 2024 season and featured the two teams with the best overall conference record, matching Indiana and Ohio State. This was the first Big Ten title game appearance for Indiana.

=== Ohio State Buckeyes ===
The Buckeyes entered the Big Ten Championship Game undefeated and top-ranked, never having trailed in the second half during the regular season. They clinched a berth following their defeat of rival Michigan on November 29. This was Ohio State's first Big Ten Championship appearance since 2020, when they defeated Northwestern 22–10.

=== Indiana Hoosiers ===
This season included numerous firsts for IU: they defeated a top-5 ranked opponent away for the first time (Week 7 at Oregon); received their highest AP poll, Coaches Poll, and College Football Playoff rankings in program history (all at No. 2); achieved a victory at Penn State in Week 11, marking their first ever win in Happy Valley; and finished the regular season with a perfect 12–0 record for the first time, exceeding their previous program record of 11 wins from the 2024 season. Indiana clinched a spot in the game following its defeat of rival Purdue on November 28. This was IU's first Big Ten Championship game appearance, in which it sought to claim its first conference title since 1967.

== Scoring summary ==
2025 Discover Big Ten Football Championship Game

Quarter	1	2	3	4	Total
No. 2 Indiana	3	3	7	0	13
No. 1 Ohio State	7	3	0	0	10

at Lucas Oil Stadium • Indianapolis, Indiana

- Date: Saturday, December 6, 2025
- Game time: 8:00 p.m. EST
- Game weather: Indoors
- Game attendance: 68,214
- Referee: Ron Snodgrass
- TV announcers (Fox/Compass Media Network): Gus Johnson (play-by-play), Joel Klatt (analyst), Jenny Taft, and Tom Rinaldi (sideline reporters)
  Compass Media: Gregg Daniels (play-by-play) and Chad Brown (color)

Scoring summary

Quarter	Time	Drive			Team	Scoring information	Score	
Quarter	Time	Plays	Yards	TOP	Team	Scoring information	IU	OSU
1st	6:51	6	12	2:06	IU	29-yard field goal by Nico Radicic	3	0
1st	0:46	3	25	0:55	OSU	Carnell Tate 9-yard touchdown reception from Julian Sayin, Jayden Fielding kick good	3	7
2nd	10:08	6	67	3:23	OSU	30-yard field goal by Jayden Fielding	3	10
2nd	2:47	14	61	7:21	IU	32-yard field goal by Nico Radicic	6	10
3rd	8:02	7	88	3:30	IU	Elijah Sarratt 17-yard touchdown reception from Fernando Mendoza, Nico Radicic kick good	13	10
"TOP" = time of possession. For other American football terms, see Glossary of American football.							13	10

Statistics	IU	OSU
First downs	17	17
Plays–yards	57–340	56–322
Rushes–yards	34–118	26–58
Passing yards	222	264
Passing: comp–att–int	15–23–1	22–30–1
Turnovers	1	1
Time of possession	29:47	30:13

Team	Category	Player	Statistics
Indiana	Passing	Fernando Mendoza	15/23, 222 yards, TD, INT
Indiana	Rushing	Kaelon Black	16 carries, 69 yards
Indiana	Receiving	Charlie Becker	6 receptions, 126 yards
Ohio State	Passing	Julian Sayin	21/29, 258 yards, TD, INT
Ohio State	Rushing	Bo Jackson	17 carries, 83 yards
Ohio State	Receiving	Jeremiah Smith	8 receptions, 144 yards

== See also ==
- List of Big Ten Conference football champions
