= Tarvos =

Tarvos may refer to:

- Tarvos "TJ" Alford (born 2006), American football player
- Tarvos Trigaranus, "the bull with three cranes", a Gaulish god
- Tarvos (moon), a moon of Saturn named after the god
- Tarvos (.hack), a character in the .hack franchise
- Tarvos Nitram, a character in the Homestuck franchise
