= Nate Roberts =

Nate Roberts may refer to:

- Nate Roberts (American football), American football player
- Nate Roberts (politician), member of the Idaho House of Representatives
- Nate Roberts (skier), American freestyle skier
- Nate Roberts (TV character), TV character in The Bill
