= Isaiah West =

American football player

No. 32 – Ohio State Buckeyes
- Position: Running back
- Class: Sophomore

Personal information
- Listed height: 5 ft 10 in (1.78 m)
- Listed weight: 210 lb (95 kg)

Career information
- High school: St. Joseph's Prep (Philadelphia, Pennsylvania)
- College: Ohio State (2025–present)
- Stats at ESPN

Isaiah West is an American college football running back for the Ohio State Buckeyes.

== Early life ==
West attended St. Joseph's Preparatory School in Philadelphia, Pennsylvania. As a junior, he rushed for 861 yards and ten touchdowns. A three-star recruit, West committed to play college football at Ohio State University.

== College career ==
Despite missing all of spring practice while recovering from an injury he sustained during his senior year of high school, West earned significant playing time as a true freshman, emerging as the Buckeyes' second option at running back behind fellow freshman Bo Jackson. He led the team in rushing against Wisconsin, carrying the ball nine times for 55 yards in a 34–0 victory.

=== Statistics ===
College statistics
Season	Team	Games	Rushing				Receiving			
Season	Team	GP	Att	Yards	Avg	TD	Rec	Yards	Avg	TD
2025	Ohio State	9	56	306	5.5	2	2	12	6.0	0
Career		9	56	306	5.5	2	2	12	6.0	0
