= Troy City School District =

School district in Alabama, United States

Location
- P O Box 529; Troy, AL 36081 United States

District information
- NCES District ID: 0103330

Other information
- Website: www.troyschools.net

Troy City School District is a public school district based in Pike County, Alabama, United States. Like many school districts in the United States, it is considered a separate government and has an entry in the US Census Bureau's twice a decade census of governments. "Census of Governments" (CSV). U.S. Census Bureau.

The District includes:

- Charles Henderson High School
- Charles Henderson Middle School
- Troy Elementary School
