= Charles Henderson High School =

Coordinates: 31.80228°N 85.94740°W

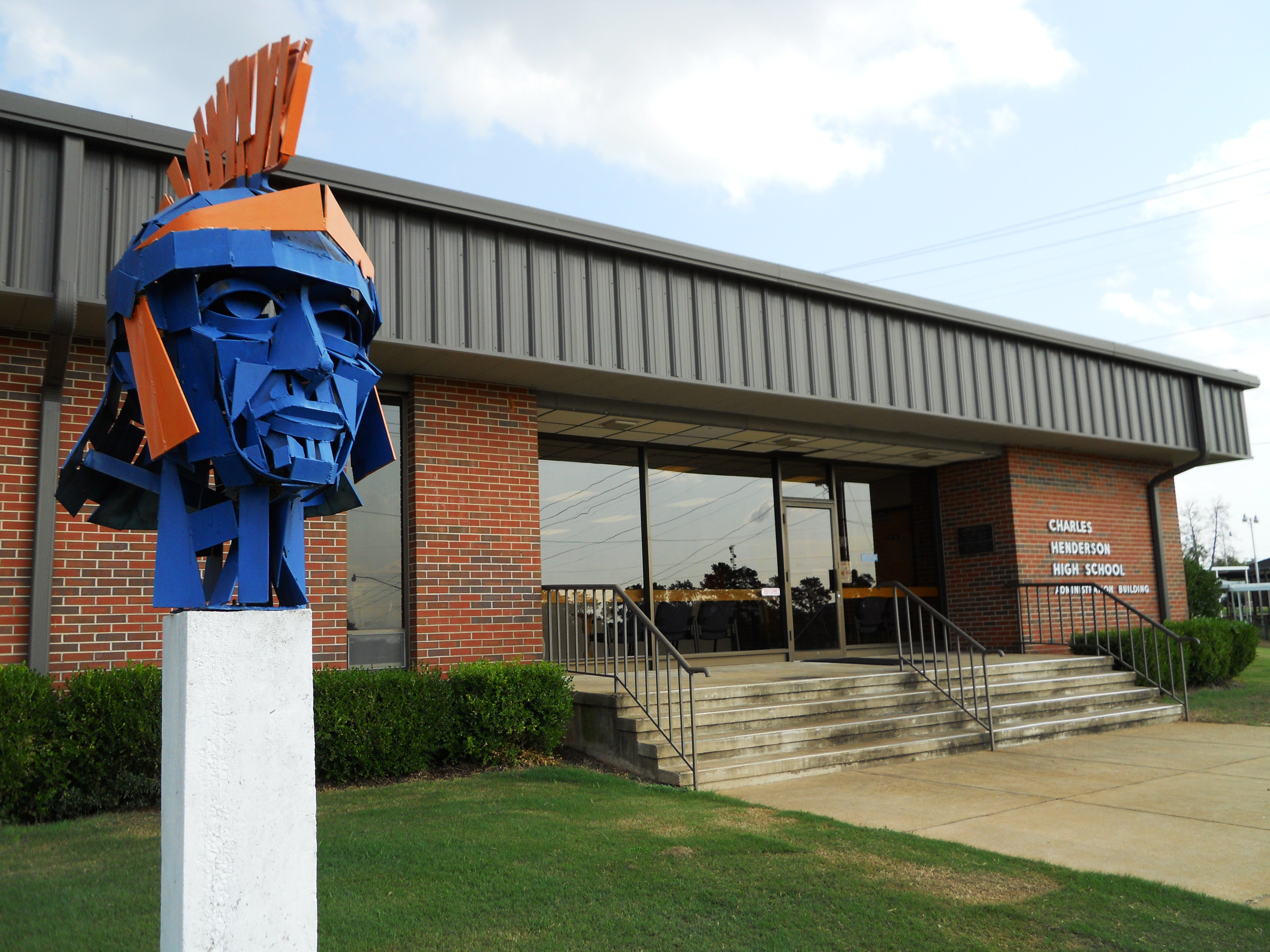

Location
- 150 George Wallace Dr; Troy, Alabama 36081; United States

Information
- Type: Public
- Motto: It's a Great Day to be a Trojan!
- School board: Troy City School Board
- School district: Troy City School District
- Superintendent: Cynthia Thomas
- CEEB code: 012670
- Principal: Lise Fayson
- Staff: 31.00
- Grades: 9–12
- Enrollment: 525 (2023-2024)
- Student to teacher ratio: 16.94
- Campus type: Suburban
- Colors: Orange and blue
- Team name: Trojans
- Website: chhs.troyschools.net

Charles Henderson High School is a grades 9-12 high school located in the city of Troy, Alabama. The namesake of the school, Charles Henderson, was the governor of the state of Alabama from 1915 to 1919. After his death in 1937, Henderson left some of his considerable estate to family members, but most of his money was used to establish a perpetual trust to fund education and healthcare in Troy. The fund was to be used for the construction of new schools and to start a charity hospital for children in Troy. Money from Henderson's trust has been used to fund Charles Henderson High School, Charles Henderson Middle School, and The Charles Henderson Child Health Care Center.

Lise Fayson is the Principal of the high school.

== Athletics ==
=== Football ===
The school's football team is in the 4A division of the AHSAA and participates in Region 2 (Southeast Alabama). As of November 2014, the team's state ranking is 78 and their national ranking is 2321.

The school's football team won the state championship in the Fall of 1980 in the 3A division of the AHSAA.

=== Baseball ===
The baseball team is in the 5-A classification. The Trojans home field is Frazier Field at Hogan's Hole. There is a blue wall in left field that is similar to the "Green Monster" at Fenway Park. In recent years, CHHS has won the Class 5A, Area 3 title in 2006, 2007, 2008, 2009, 2010 and 2012. The Trojans moved to 4A for 2013 and 2014, where they won both Area titles and State titles.

In 2004, the Trojans won the 5A State Championship by defeating Cullman High School in best-of-three series. The team finished the season with final record of 34–11.

In 2008, the Trojans made it to the 5A State Championship game, where they would lose the series to Cullman High School and finished as the 5A State Runner-Up.

In 2013, CHHS went 40-3 the entire season which is a state record for winning percentage in all classifications and won the 4A State Championship by sweeping through the playoffs and beating Brooks High School in the finals. The Trojans also were ranked No. 1 in every poll that spring and are debatably the best baseball team in school history.

In 2014, the Trojans won the 4A State Championship yet again. The team had won 18 playoff games in a row before dropping game one of the state finals to Ardmore High School, then went on to take both games of the double header the following day.

=== Tennis ===
In 1992, Charles Henderson's Royce Emerson won an individual state championship after winning the #1-seed bracket in the 5A Alabama State Playoffs. That same year, the doubles duo of Royce Emerson and Chris Giglio won the 5A doubles state championship.

=== Robotics ===
The Charles Henderson High School BEST Robotics team was first sponsored in 2010 by the physics teacher at the time. The robotics team is in the Wiregrass BEST Hub of the BEST robotics national competition. In the years of 2010 and 2011 the robotics team made it to the South's BEST competition, which is the second stage of what is usually a three-stage competition which is in order: Hub (Wiregrass Best), Regional (South's Best), National (BEST Robotics).

== Notable alumni ==
- Corey Dennis, college football coach and former player, currently offensive coordinator at UNLV
- Zac Etheridge, college football coach and former player, currently cornerbacks coach at the University of Miami
- Zion Grady, college football defensive end for the Ohio State Buckeyes (transferred after his junior year)
- Brian Meadows, former Major League Baseball player
