= Carnell Tate =

American football player (born 2005)

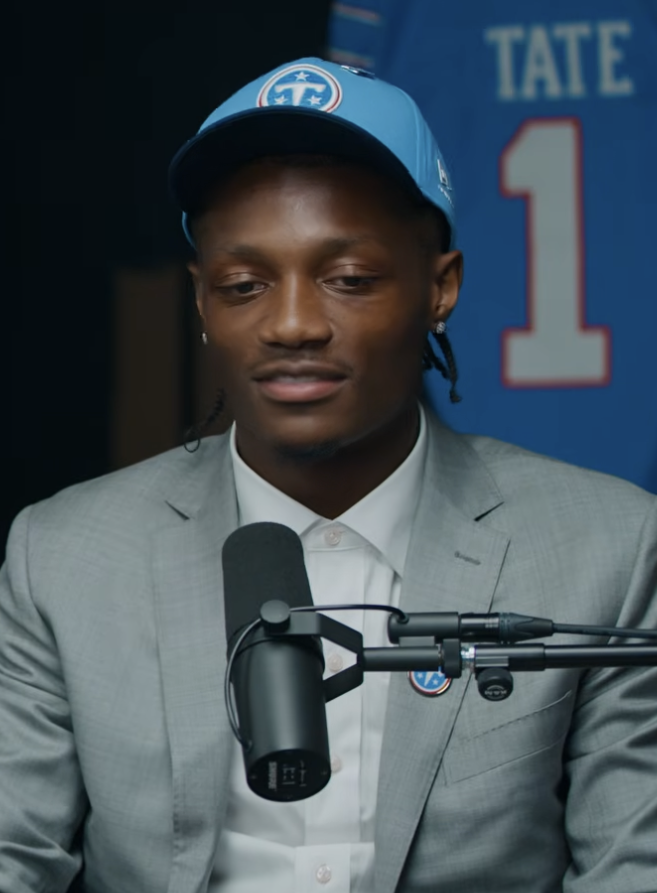
- Tate with the Tennessee Titans in 2026

No. 14 – Tennessee Titans
- Position: Wide receiver
- Roster status: Active

Personal information
- Born: January 19, 2005 (age 21); Chicago, Illinois, U.S.
- Listed height: 6 ft 2 in (1.88 m)
- Listed weight: 192 lb (87 kg)

Career information
- High school: IMG Academy (Bradenton, Florida)
- College: Ohio State (2023–2025)
- NFL draft: 2026: 1st round, 4th overall pick

Career history
- Tennessee Titans (2026–present)

Awards and highlights
- CFP national champion (2024); Second-team All-American (2025); First-team All-Big Ten (2025)

Career NFL statistics as of Week 8, 2026
- Receptions: 34
- Receiving yards: 413
- Receiving touchdowns: 1
- Stats at Pro Football Reference

Carnell Tate (born January 19, 2005) is an American professional football wide receiver for the Tennessee Titans of the National Football League (NFL). Tate played college football for the Ohio State Buckeyes, winning the 2024 national championship before being selected fourth overall by the Titans in the 2026 NFL draft.

== Early life ==
Tate was born on January 19, 2005, and grew up in Chicago, Illinois, where he attended Marist High School his freshman and sophomore years. As a freshman, he caught 28 passes for 444 yards and five touchdowns, with his sophomore year being cancelled due to the COVID-19 pandemic. Prior to his junior year in 2021, he transferred to IMG Academy in Bradenton, Florida.

Tate was a five-star recruit and ranked as the No. 22 prospect nationally at the end of the recruiting cycle. He received 37 total scholarship offers in his time at IMG, including schools such as Ohio State, Tennessee, LSU, Alabama, and Arizona. On June 20, 2022, Tate announced his commitment to Ohio State.

== College career ==
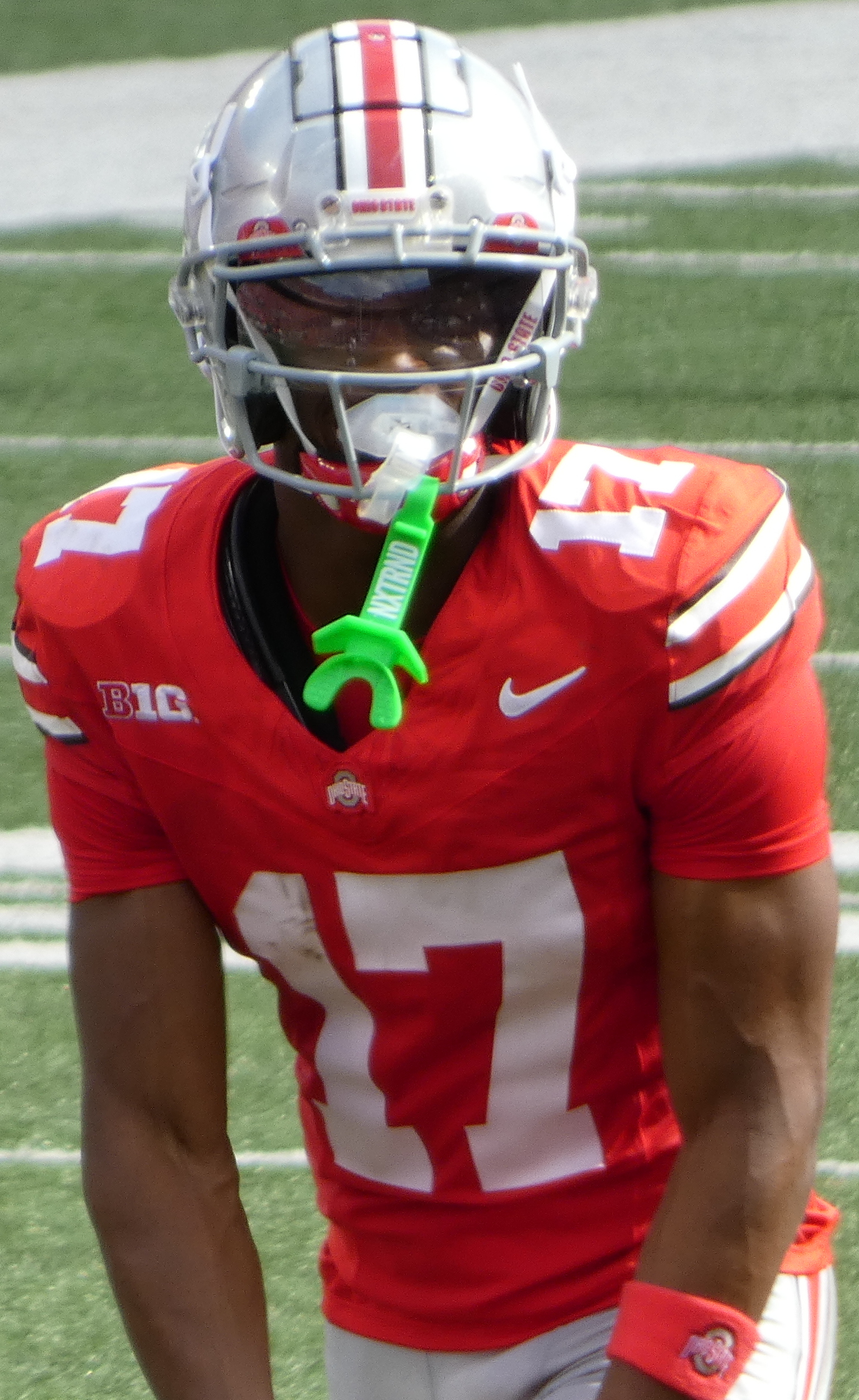
Tate with the Ohio State Buckeyes in 2024

Tate entered a crowded wide receiver room in his freshman season at Ohio State in 2023. He scored his first collegiate touchdown against the Western Kentucky Hilltoppers with a 28-yard reception from Devin Brown. He finished the season appearing in all 13 games, recording 18 receptions for 264 yards and the one touchdown. Tate became a starter across from Jeremiah Smith his sophomore year in 2024. On November 16, in his return to his hometown, he caught two touchdown passes in the Buckeyes' 31–7 win over the Northwestern Wildcats at Wrigley Field. He played a big role in the playoffs for Ohio State, with seven catches for 87 yards in their 28–14 win over the Texas Longhorns in the Cotton Bowl Classic. Ohio State finished the season beating the Notre Dame Fighting Irish in the College Football National Championship 34–23. For the season, he started all 15 games and had 52 receptions for 733 yards and four touchdowns. Tate returned to Ohio State for his junior season in 2025 again as a starter across from Smith. In a 42–3 win against the Minnesota Golden Gophers, he had a career high nine receptions for 183 receiving yards along with one touchdown. He finished the season with 51 receptions for 875 yards and nine touchdowns. On January 6, 2026, Tate declared for the 2026 NFL draft.

Tate majored in sports industry at Ohio State. He has five total academic honors to date so far during his time at Ohio State. He has gotten two OSU Scholar-Athlete awards, and two Academic All-Big Ten honors.

== Professional career ==
Pre-draft measurables
Height	Weight	Arm length	Hand span	Wingspan	40-yard dash	10-yard split	20-yard split
6 ft 2 1/4 in (1.89 m)	192 lb (87 kg)	31 3/4 in (0.81 m)	10 1/4 in (0.26 m)	6 ft 6 in (1.98 m)	4.53 s	1.61 s	2.66 s
All values from NFL Combine

Tate was selected in the first round, fourth overall by the Tennessee Titans in the 2026 NFL draft. Tate joined wide receiver Marvin Harrison Jr. as the highest drafted wide receiver in Ohio State history. On May 8, 2026, he signed a four-year, $51.1 million contract, which included a $33.6 million signing bonus, with the Titans. In Week 6 against the Indianapolis Colts, Tate recorded his first career touchdown on an eight–yard reception from Cam Ward. He was named Offensive Rookie of the Month for October after posting 21 catches for 290 yards and one touchdown.

== Career statistics ==
=== College ===
Legend
**Bold**	Career high

Year	Team	Games		Receiving				Rushing			
Year	Team	GP	GS	Rec	Yds	Avg	TD	Att	Yds	Avg	TD
2023	Ohio State	13	0	18	264	14.7	1	0	0	—	0
2024	Ohio State	15	15	**52**	733	14.1	4	0	6	—	0
2025	Ohio State	11	11	51	**875**	**17.2**	**9**	**2**	**16**	**8.0**	0
Career		39	26	121	1,872	15.5	14	2	22	11.0	0

== Personal life ==
Tate grew up in West Chicago and was raised by his mother, Ashley Griggs. In July 2023, his mother was shot and killed in a drive-by shooting in West Garfield Park, Chicago. He often performs a "blowing a kiss" celebration in honor of her.
