= Brandon Inniss =

American football player (born 2004)

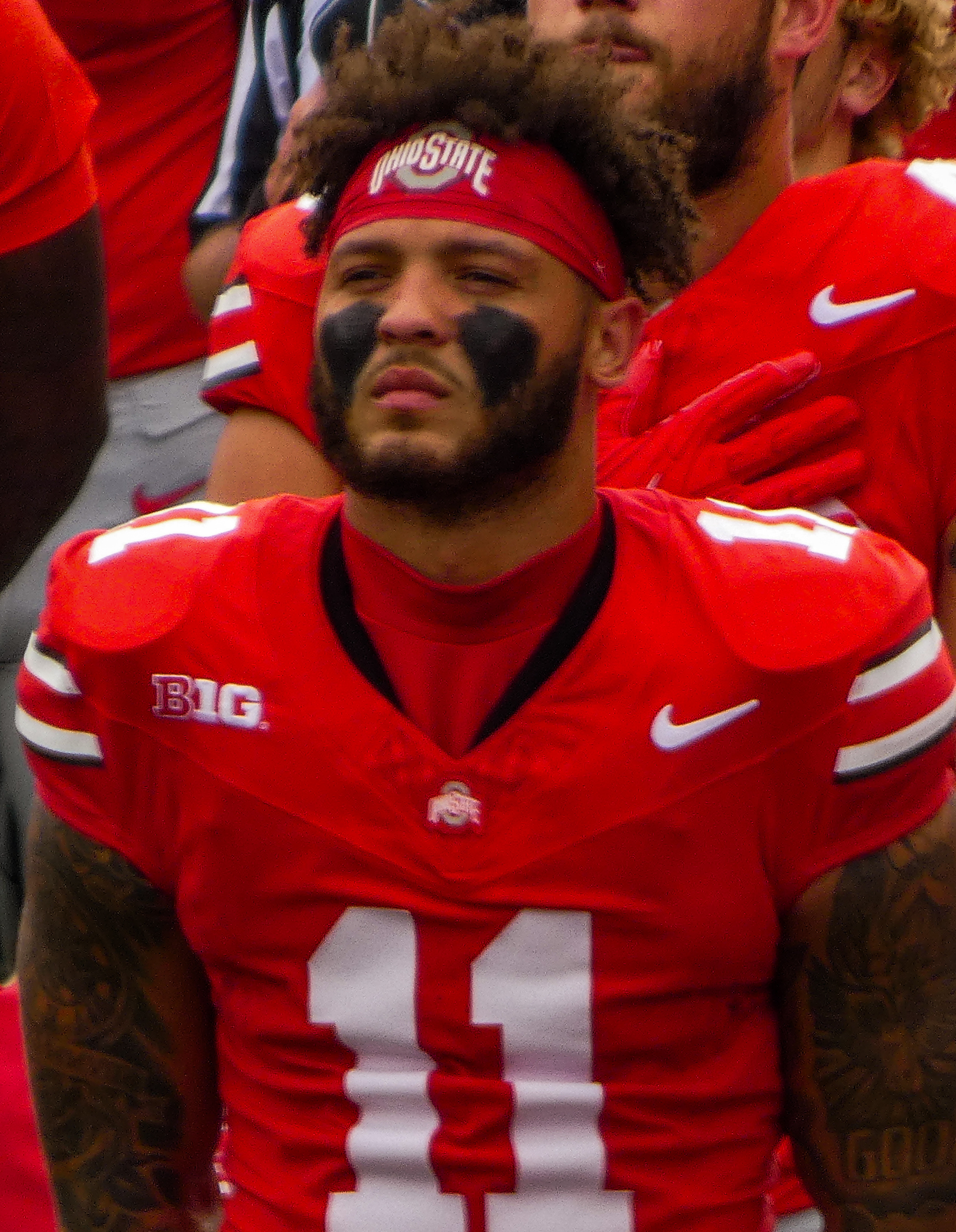
- Inniss in 2024

No. 0 – Ohio State Buckeyes
- Position: Wide receiver
- Class: Senior

Personal information
- Born: October 7, 2004 (age 22); Baltimore, Maryland, U.S.
- Listed height: 6 ft 0 in (1.83 m)
- Listed weight: 199 lb (90 kg)

Career information
- High school: American Heritage (Plantation, Florida)
- College: Ohio State (2023–present)

Awards and highlights
- CFP national champion (2024)
- Stats at ESPN

Brandon Inniss (born October 7, 2004) is an American college football wide receiver for the Ohio State Buckeyes.

== Early life ==
Inniss was born on October 7, 2004 in Baltimore, Maryland. He grew up in Hollywood, Florida and attended American Heritage School. He was ranked the No. 3 wide receiver nationally and the No. 6 player in the state of Florida. He was rated by Rivals.com as a five-star player the No. 8 recruit in the 2023 college football recruiting class. Inniss committed to play football at Ohio State.

== College career ==
Inniss committed to Ohio State in June 2022. He enrolled in classes in June 2023. His first catch and first touchdown of his collegiate career would come late in a game against Purdue, on a 58-yard pass from Devin Brown.

=== Statistics ===
Year	Team	Games		Receiving			
Year	Team	GP	GS	Rec	Yds	Avg	TD
2023	Ohio State	8	0	1	58	58.0	0
2024	Ohio State	16	0	14	147	12.6	1
2025	Ohio State	14	7	36	271	7.5	3
2026	Ohio State	3	2	8	133	16.6	1
Career		41	9	59	638	10.8	6
