= Quincy Porter (American football) =

American football player

No. 0 – Notre Dame Fighting Irish
- Position: Wide receiver
- Class: Sophomore

Personal information
- Listed height: 6 ft 4 in (1.93 m)
- Listed weight: 215 lb (98 kg)

Career information
- High school: Bergen Catholic (Oradell, New Jersey)
- College: Ohio State (2025); Notre Dame (2026–present)
- Stats at ESPN

Quincy Porter is an American college football wide receiver for the Notre Dame Fighting Irish. He previously played for the Ohio State Buckeyes.

== Early life ==
Porter was raised in New Milford, New Jersey, and attended Bergen Catholic High School in Oradell, New Jersey, where he played football and was a top wide receiver. He also competed in track and field in high school. As a sophomore in 2022, he recorded 686 receiving yards and 11 touchdowns, receiving offers from major college football programs including Georgia, Penn State and Michigan by the end of the year. He then caught 41 passes for 969 yards and 16 touchdowns as a junior in 2023. As a senior in 2024, he caught 57 passes for 969 yards and 11 touchdowns. That year, he helped Bergen Catholic win its record fourth-straight state championship. After the season, he was selected to the All-American Bowl. A five-star prospect and one of the top prospects in the 2025 recruiting class, he committed to play college football for the Ohio State Buckeyes.

== College career ==
Porter joined Ohio State in 2025. He was the first freshman to lose his "black stripe" – a team tradition making the player a "full Buckeye" and eligible to play in games. He caught four passes for 50 yards in Ohio State's 2025 spring game.

=== Statistics ===
Year	Team	GP	Receiving			
Year	Team	GP	Rec	Yds	Avg	TD
2025	Ohio State	5	4	59	14.8	0
Career		5	4	59	14.8	0
