= Faheem Delane =

American football player

No. 13 – LSU Tigers
- Position: Safety
- Class: Sophomore

Personal information
- Listed height: 6 ft 2 in (1.88 m)
- Listed weight: 216 lb (98 kg)

Career information
- High school: Our Lady of Good Counsel (Olney, Maryland)
- College: Ohio State (2025); LSU (2026–present)
- Stats at ESPN

Faheem Delane is an American college football safety for the LSU Tigers. He previously played for the Ohio State Buckeyes.

== Early life ==
Delane attended Our Lady of Good Counsel High School in Olney, Maryland, where he played both cornerback and linebacker on the football team. As a junior, he posted 69 tackles and 18 pass breakups and helped his team win the Washington Catholic Athletic Conference (WCAC) championship, earning first-team All-Met honors by The Washington Post. As a senior, he recorded 97 tackles with seven tackles for loss, two sacks, and three interceptions in 12 games and was named the All-Met Defensive Player of the Year.

Delane was rated as a consensus four-star recruit. He was ranked as the fifth-best safety prospect in the class of 2025 by both ESPN and Rivals.com. Delane received offers from programs such as Alabama, Florida, Florida State, Georgia, LSU, Miami, Michigan, Ohio State, Ole Miss, Oregon, Penn State, Tennessee, Texas, Texas A&M, and USC. He verbally committed to playing college football at Ohio State University on June 9, 2024, and signed with the Buckeyes that December.

== College career ==
Delane enrolled early at Ohio State in January 2025, joining the Buckeyes in time for spring practices. He intercepted a pass thrown by Tavien St. Clair in the spring game. Delane continued to impress during fall practices and had his "black stripe" removed following the second scrimmage of camp in mid-August, signalling his full membership on the team. He settled into a backup safety role behind Caleb Downs during the 2025 season. Delane recorded 12 tackles, including one tackle for loss, in 13 games. After the season, he entered the NCAA transfer portal. Delane was rated as a four-star transfer recruit by 247Sports and Rivals.com. A few days later, he announced he would transfer to play for the LSU Tigers, following in his older brother's footsteps.

== Personal life ==
Delane has two brothers and two sisters. His older brother Mansoor is a cornerback for the Kansas City Chiefs.
