= Julian Sayin =

American football player (born 2005)

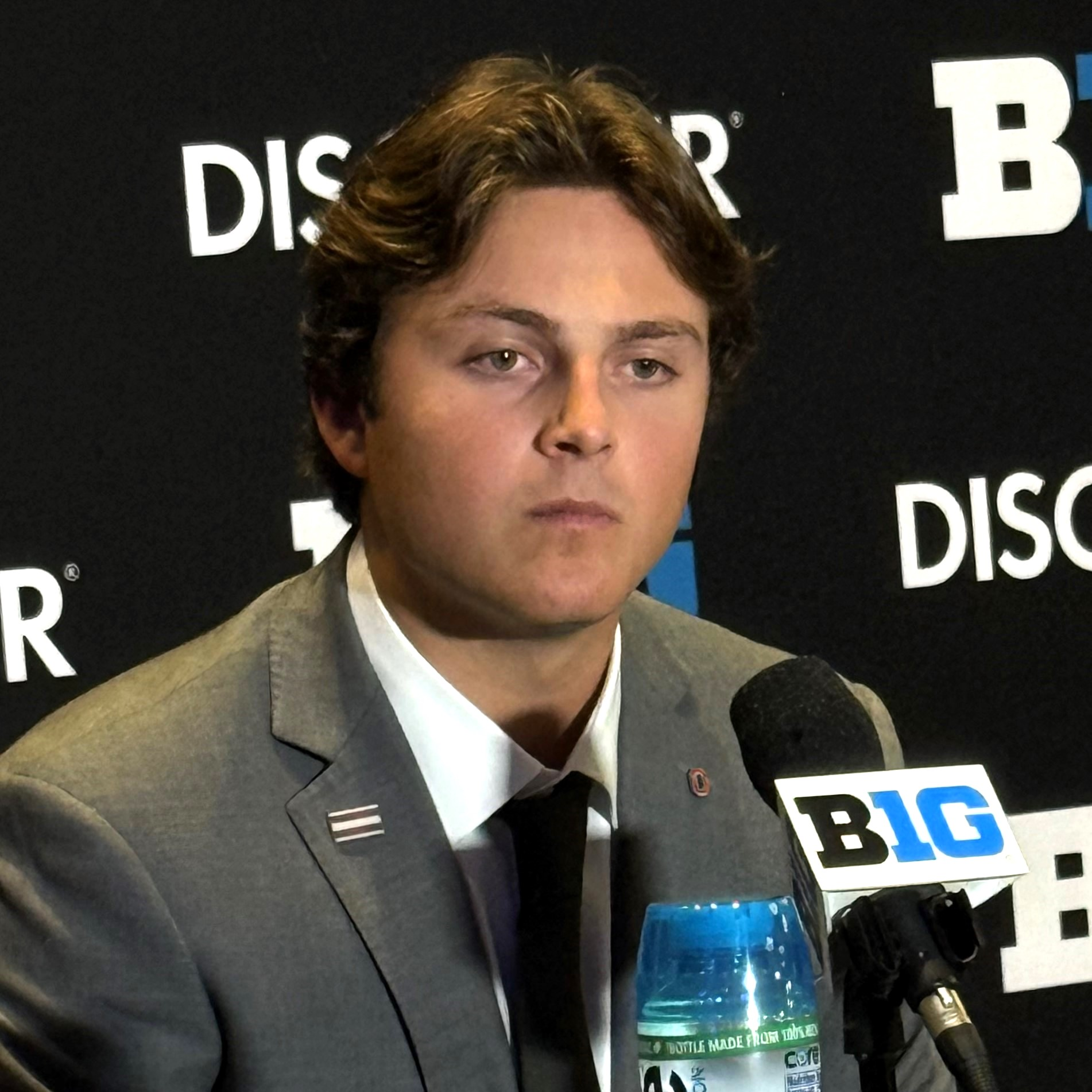
- Sayin at 2026 Big Ten Media Day

No. 10 – Ohio State Buckeyes
- Position: Quarterback
- Class: Redshirt Sophomore

Personal information
- Born: July 22, 2005 (age 21); San Diego, California, U.S.
- Listed height: 6 ft 1 in (1.85 m)
- Listed weight: 214 lb (97 kg)

Career information
- High school: Carlsbad (Carlsbad, California)
- College: Ohio State (2024–present)

Awards and highlights
- CFP national champion (2024); Big Ten Freshman of the Year (2025); Second-team All-Big Ten (2025); Shaun Alexander Freshman of the Year (2025)

Career statistics as of Week 4, 2026
- Passing attempts: 518
- Passing completions: 389
- Completion percentage: 75.1%
- TD–INT: 43-9
- Passing yards: 4,900
- Passer efficiency: 178.5
- Rushing yards: -13
- Rushing touchdowns: 2
- Stats at ESPN

Julian Sayin (SAY-ən; born July 22, 2005) is an American college football quarterback for the Ohio State Buckeyes.

== Early life ==
Sayin grew up in Carlsbad, California and attended Carlsbad High School in Carlsbad. Sayin sat behind his brother, Aidan, his freshman season. He became the Lancers' starting quarterback entering his sophomore year and finished the season with 2,769 passing yards with 34 touchdowns and five interceptions. Sayin passed for 2,708 yards and 27 touchdowns as a junior. On June 27, 2022, Sayin was announced as one of the quarterbacks to play in the 2024 Polynesian Bowl. He participated in the finals of the 2023 Elite 11 quarterback competition and was named the tournament's MVP. Sayin also participated in the QB retreat competition in 2023 with Steve Clarkson. Sayin was named captain of the football team before the 2023 season. In his final season, he had 2,369 passing yards, 24 touchdowns, and one interception, adding four additional rushing touchdowns.

College recruiting
Name	Hometown	School	Height	Weight	Commit date
Julian Sayin; QB	Carlsbad, CA	Carlsbad High School	6 ft 1 in (1.85 m)	195 lb (88 kg)	Nov 2, 2022
Julian Sayin; QB	Recruit ratings: Rivals: 247Sports: ESPN: (91)				

Sayin was rated a five-star recruit and the second-best quarterback prospect in the 2024 class. He received his first scholarship offer when he was in 8th grade from Kenny Dillingham, then the offensive coordinator at Florida State. Sayin committed to play college football at Alabama during his junior season after considering offers from Georgia and LSU. He had other notable offers from Notre Dame, Texas, and Florida.

High school statistics
Season	Passing							Rushing			Season	
Season	Cmp	Att	Pct	Yds	TD	Int	Rtg	Att	Yds	TD	Win	Loss
2020	7	14	50.0	124	1	0	104.5	3	57	0	0	0
2021	181	253	71.5	2,769	34	5	138.7	35	208	2	11	1
2022	163	245	66.5	2,708	27	4	133.5	26	154	3	10	2
2023	160	212	75.5	2,369	24	1	147.3	29	186	4	9	1
Career	511	724	70.6	7,970	86	10	140.6	93	605	9	30	4

== College career ==
=== Alabama ===
Sayin began practicing as an early enrollee with Alabama during the 2023 season in preparation for the 2024 Rose Bowl. On January 19, 2024, Sayin entered the transfer portal following the retirement of Nick Saban.

=== Ohio State ===
==== 2024 season ====
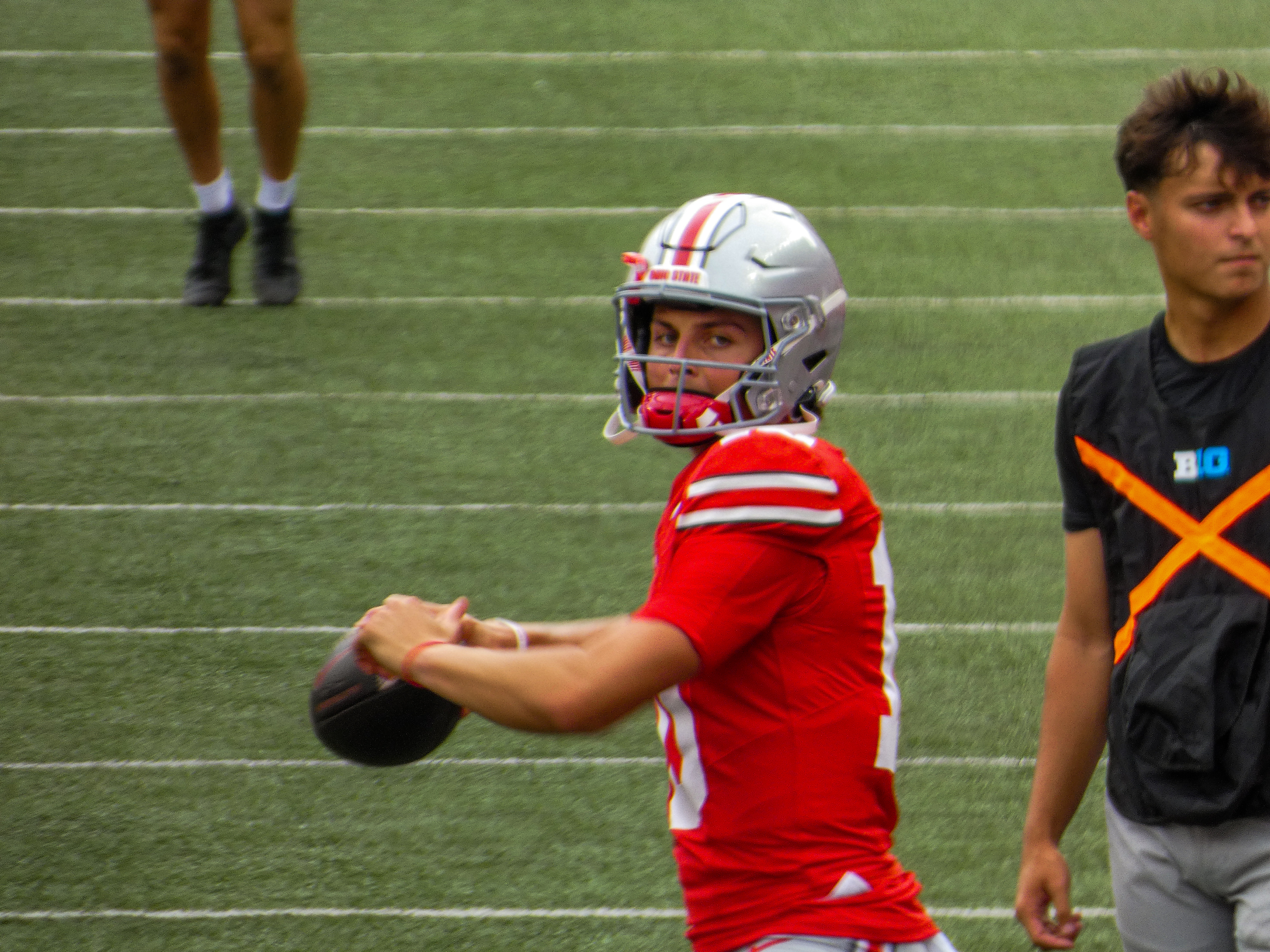
Sayin with the Ohio State Buckeyes in 2024

On January 21, 2024, Sayin announced he was transferring to Ohio State. On January 31, he signed a name, image, and likeness (NIL) deal with Panini America, a trading card company owned by Panini Group. On February 14, 2024, Sayin signed another NIL deal this time with an Ohio State-driven collective known as The Foundation. Sayin threw his first collegiate touchdown against Western Michigan on September 7, 2024. Sayin made a few more appearances throughout the season, and was part of the 2025 College Football Playoff National Championship team.

==== 2025 season ====
On August 18, 2025, Sayin was named the starting quarterback by head coach Ryan Day as a redshirt freshman following the departure of Will Howard to the 2025 NFL Draft. In his first start, Sayin led the Buckeyes to a 14–7 victory over No. 1 Texas, completing 13 of 20 passes for 126 yards and one touchdown. The following week, he went 18 of 19 for 306 yards with four touchdowns and one interception in a 70–0 win against Grambling State. In a Week 8 victory against Wisconsin, Sayin completed 36 of 42 passes for a career-high 393 yards and four touchdowns. He led the Buckeyes to an undefeated 12–0 regular season, earning a No. 1 national ranking and a berth in the 2025 Big Ten Football Championship Game against Indiana. Sayin completed 21 of 29 passes for 258 yards with one touchdown and one interception in a 13–10 loss. In the CFP quarterfinal at the Cotton Bowl, Sayin and Ohio State were defeated by Miami, 24–14. He finished the game 22 of 35 for 287 yards with one touchdown and two interceptions.

Sayin concluded the season with 301 completions on 391 attempts (77.0% completion rate, third-best all-time in FBS) for 3,610 yards, 32 touchdowns, and eight interceptions. He was named Second-Team All-Big Ten and received both the Shaun Alexander Freshman of the Year and Big Ten Freshman of the Year honors. He also finished fourth in Heisman Trophy voting.

In his 2025 full-season campaign, Sayin fell short of breaking Bo Nix's NCAA pass completion percentage record set in 2023, finishing at 77.0% to Nix's 77.5%. Sayin was on pace to break the record, but was derailed by a poor performance during a losing effort to Miami in the 2025 Cotton Bowl Classic where he completed just 22 of 35 passes with 2 interceptions, falling just two missed completions shy of Nix's record.

=== College statistics ===
Legend
	Led NCAA Division I FBS
**Bold**	Career high

Season	Team	Games			Passing								Rushing			
Season	Team	GP	GS	Record	Cmp	Att	Pct	Yds	Y/A	TD	Int	Rtg	Att	Yds	Avg	TD
2024	Ohio State	4	0	—	5	12	41.7	84	7.0	1	0	128.0	2	**24**	**12.0**	0
2025	Ohio State	**14**	**14**	**12–2**	**301**	**391**	**77.0**	**3,610**	9.2	**32**	**8**	177.5	**42**	-44	-1.0	0
2026	Ohio State	7	7	6–1	131	192	68.2	2,007	**10.5**	19	4	**184.9**	37	-9	-0.2	**2**
Career		25	21	18–3	437	595	73.4	5,701	9.6	52	12	178.7	81	-29	0.4	2

== Personal life ==
Sayin's older brother, Aidan, was a starting quarterback for the Penn Quakers and currently plays for the Columbus Aviators of the United Football League. His older sister, Bailey, played soccer for the Chicago Maroons.
