= Riley Pettijohn =

American football player (born 2007)

No. 5 – Ohio State Buckeyes
- Position: Linebacker
- Class: Sophomore

Personal information
- Born: July 8, 2007 (age 19)
- Listed height: 6 ft 2 in (1.88 m)
- Listed weight: 231 lb (105 kg)

Career information
- High school: McKinney (McKinney, Texas)
- College: Ohio State (2025–present)
- Stats at ESPN

Riley Pettijohn (born July 8, 2007) is an American college football linebacker for the Ohio State Buckeyes.

== Early life ==
Pettijohn attended McKinney High School located in McKinney, Texas. Coming out of high school, he was rated as a five-star recruit, the 4th overall linebacker, and the 31st overall player in the class of 2025, where he held offers from schools such as Ohio State, Texas, Texas A&M, and USC. Ultimately, Pettijohn committed to play college football for the Ohio State Buckeyes.

== College career ==
Pettijohn entered his true freshman season in 2025, set to contribute for the Buckeyes. In week two of the 2025 season, he recorded two tackles, a pass deflection, a forced fumble, and a fumble recovery which he returned for a touchdown in a victory over Grambling State.

== Personal life ==
Pettijohn is the son of former Syracuse starting defensive lineman Duke Pettijohn.
