= Jayden Fielding =

American football player (born c.2004)

Profile
- Position: Placekicker

Personal information
- Born: 2004 (age 21–22)
- Listed height: 6 ft 0 in (1.83 m)
- Listed weight: 175 lb (79 kg)

Career information
- High school: IMG Academy (Bradenton, Florida)
- College: Ohio State (2022–2025)
- NFL draft: 2026: undrafted

Career history
- Ottawa Redblacks (2026)*
- * Offseason or practice squad member only

Awards and highlights
- CFP national champion (2024); Second-team All-Big Ten (2023)
- Stats at ESPN

Jayden Fielding (born c. 2004) is an American professional football placekicker. He played college football for the Ohio State Buckeyes.

== Early life ==
Fielding attended Clear Creek High School in League City, Texas, and later transferred to IMG Academy in Bradenton, Florida. As a senior, he converted 91 percent of his kickoffs for touchbacks and had a long field goal of 50 yards. Fielding committed to play college football at Ohio State University as a preferred walk-on.

== College career ==
As a freshman in 2022, Fielding handled kickoff duties in all 13 games for the Buckeyes. He opened the 2023 season as the starting kicker, beating out Parker Lewis for the job after the graduation of Noah Ruggles. In his first start, Fielding went three for three on his field goals and two for two on extra points in a win over Indiana. In week 6, he made all three of his field goal attempts and all four of his extra point attempts in a win over Maryland. On January 20, 2025, Fielding kicked the game-sealing field goal in the 2025 College Football National Championship game, giving the Buckeyes a 34–23 win over Notre Dame. On December 6, 2025, Fielding missed a game-tying 27-yard shot late in the Buckeyes' loss to Indiana at the Big Ten Championship game.

== Professional career ==
Pre-draft measurables
Height	Weight	Arm length	Hand span	Wingspan
5 ft 11 5/8 in (1.82 m)	175 lb (79 kg)	29 1/4 in (0.74 m)	8 3/4 in (0.22 m)	5 ft 9 3/4 in (1.77 m)
All values from Pro Day

On May 8, 2026, Fielding signed with the Ottawa Redblacks of the Canadian Football League (CFL). He was released by the Redblacks on May 18.
