= Keenan Bailey =

American football coach

Current position
- Title: Co-offensive coordinator, tight ends coach
- Team: Ohio State
- Conference: Big Ten

Coaching career (HC unless noted)
- 2014–2015: Notre Dame (recruiting analyst)
- 2016–2018: Ohio State (offensive intern)
- 2019–2021: Ohio State (OQC)
- 2022: Ohio State (OQC / special assistant to HC)
- 2023–2024: Ohio State (TE)
- 2025–present: Ohio State (co-OC / TE)

Keenan Bailey is an American college football coach who is currently the co-offensive coordinator and tight ends coach for the Ohio State Buckeyes.

== Coaching career ==
Bailey attended University of Notre Dame where he studied American studies and got his first coaching job as recruiting analyst for the Fighting Irish in 2014. In 2016, he joined the Ohio State Buckeyes as an offensive intern. In 2019, Bailey was promoted to serve as an offensive quality control coach for the Buckeyes. Ahead of the 2022 season, he added to his title as a special assistant to the head coach, while also working as a quality control coach. In 2023, Bailey got his first on-field coaching job, becoming the tight ends coach for Ohio State. After two seasons in the role, he became the Buckeyes co-offensive coordinator.
