= Devin Sanchez =

American football player (born 2006)

No. 6 – Ohio State Buckeyes
- Position: Cornerback
- Class: Sophomore

Personal information
- Born: October 4, 2006 (age 20)
- Listed height: 6 ft 2 in (1.88 m)
- Listed weight: 198 lb (90 kg)

Career information
- High school: North Shore (Houston, Texas)
- College: Ohio State (2025–present)

Devin Sanchez (born October 4, 2006) is an American college football cornerback for the Ohio State Buckeyes.

== Early life ==
Sanchez attended and played high school football at North Shore Senior High School in Houston, Texas. As a junior in 2023, he notched 32 tackles, 11 pass deflections, five interceptions, and one defensive touchdown, and was named a first-team Junior All-American by MaxPreps. Sanchez was rated as a five-star recruit, the second-overall cornerback, and the sixth overall player in the class of 2025. He committed to play college football for the Ohio State Buckeyes over offers from schools such as Alabama, Texas A&M, LSU, Oklahoma, Texas and USC.

== College career ==
As a freshman in 2025, Sanchez played in 13 games with 1 start, notching 15 tackles, two pass deflections, and a fumble recovery.

== Personal life ==
His paternal grandfather is Mexican-American.
