= Zion Grady =

American football player

No. 9 – Ohio State Buckeyes
- Position: Defensive end
- Class: Sophomore

Personal information
- Listed height: 6 ft 4 in (1.93 m)
- Listed weight: 258 lb (117 kg)

Career information
- High school: Enterprise (Enterprise, Alabama)
- College: Ohio State (2025–present)
- Stats at ESPN

Zion Grady is an American college football defensive end for the Ohio State Buckeyes.

== Early life ==
Grady attended Charles Henderson High School in Troy, Alabama before transferring to Enterprise High School in Enterprise, Alabama for his senior year. As a sophomore in 2022, he was the Alabama Class 5A Lineman of the Year after recording 108 tackles and 22 sacks. As a junior, he had 87 tackles, 11 sacks with an interception and as a senior had 70 tackles and 14 sacks.

A four-star recruit, Grady was selected to play in the Navy All-American Bowl. He originally committed to play college football at the University of Alabama before flipping his commitment to Ohio State University. He officially signed in December 2024.

== College career ==
Grady earned playing time as a backup his true freshman year at Ohio State in 2025.
