= Billy Fessler =

American football coach (born 1995)

Current position
- Title: Quarterbacks coach
- Team: Ohio State
- Conference: Big Ten

Biographical details
- Born: August 6, 1995 (age 31); Erie, Pennsylvania, U.S.

Playing career
- 2014–2017: Penn State
- Position: Quarterback

Coaching career (HC unless noted)
- 2018: Slippery Rock (GA)
- 2019: Mississippi State (GA)
- 2020–2021: Ohio State (GA)
- 2022: Akron (QB)
- 2023: Akron (OC/QB)
- 2024: Ohio State (analyst)
- 2024: UCLA (QB)
- 2025–present: Ohio State (QB)

William Gallagher Fessler (born August 6, 1995) is an American college football coach. He is the quarterbacks coach for Ohio State University, a position he has held since 2025. He also coached for Slippery Rock, Mississippi State, and Akron. He played college football for Penn State as a quarterback.

== Early life ==
Fessler attended Erie Cathedral Prep in Erie, Pennsylvania. He was a four-year letterwinner in football, completing 199 of 364 passing attempts for 3,606 yards and 47 touchdowns to only 13 interceptions and adding 407 yards and ten touchdowns on the ground. Fessler also won a letter in baseball batting .350 with 10 runs batted in (RBI) in 12 games. He decided to walk on to play college football at Penn State.

== College career ==
Fessler was redshirted in his first season at Penn State, and he did not see any playing time in his second season. In his third season, he made his collegiate debut against Indiana as a holder and played in four games that year. In his fourth season, Fessler played in all 13 games, primarily as the holder. However, he got his only career completion to Jonathan Holland for eight yards.

== Coaching career ==
Fessler started his coaching career at Slippery Rock as a graduate assistant and running backs coach for one year. From there, he was hired as a graduate assistant for the Mississippi State Bulldogs, where he also coached for one year. Fessler was then hired as an offensive graduate assistant at Ohio State. He coached with the Buckeyes for two seasons, helping them rank at the top of many major passing stats and help the achieve two Heisman Trophy finalists in Justin Fields and C. J. Stroud. Fessler's next coaching job was as the quarterback's coach for the Akron Zips. On January 12, 2023, he was promoted to be Akron's offensive coordinator while still coaching the quarterbacks. On January 10, 2024, Fessler was hired by the UCLA Bruins as the team's quarterback's coach.
