= Ethan Onianwa =

American football player (born 2003)

No. 75 – Atlanta Falcons
- Position: Offensive tackle
- Roster status: Active

Personal information
- Born: August 16, 2003 (age 23); Flint, Michigan, U.S.
- Listed height: 6 ft 6 in (1.98 m)
- Listed weight: 333 lb (151 kg)

Career information
- High school: Cinco Ranch (Cinco Ranch)
- College: Rice (2021–2024); Ohio State (2025)
- NFL draft: 2026: 7th round, 231st overall pick

Career history
- Atlanta Falcons (2026–present)

Career NFL statistics as of Week 7, 2026
- Games played: 1
- Stats at Pro Football Reference

Ethan Uchechukwu Onianwa (born August 16, 2003) is an American professional football offensive tackle for the Atlanta Falcons of the National Football League (NFL). He played college football for the Rice Owls and Ohio State Buckeyes and was selected by the Falcons in the seventh round of the 2026 NFL draft.

== Early life ==
Onianwa attended Cinco Ranch High School in Cinco Ranch, Texas. He was rated as a three-star recruit, the 67th offensive lineman, and the 1,130th-overall player in the class of 2021. Onianwa committed to play college football for the Rice Owls.

== College career ==
=== Rice ===
In his first three seasons from 2021 to 2023 Onianwa appeared in 28 games where he made 25 starts for the Owls at right tackle. Ahead of the 2024 season, he switched over to left tackle. In 2024, Onianwa made nine starts at left tackle. After the season, he entered his name into the NCAA transfer portal.

=== Ohio State ===
Onianwa transferred to play for the Ohio State Buckeyes. He is projected to start at left tackle for the Buckeyes in 2025.

== Professional career ==
Pre-draft measurables
Height	Weight	Arm length	Hand span	Wingspan	40-yard dash	10-yard split	20-yard split	20-yard shuttle	Three-cone drill	Vertical jump	Broad jump	Bench press
6 ft 6 3/8 in (1.99 m)	333 lb (151 kg)	34 3/8 in (0.87 m)	10 in (0.25 m)	6 ft 11 3/8 in (2.12 m)	5.21 s	1.84 s	3.02 s	4.69 s	7.90 s	30.0 in (0.76 m)	8 ft 4 in (2.54 m)	24 reps
All values from Pro Day

Onianwa was selected by the Atlanta Falcons in the seventh round with the 231st-overall pick of the 2026 NFL draft.
