= Caden Curry =

American football player (born 2003)

No. 55 – Indianapolis Colts
- Position: Defensive end
- Roster status: Active

Personal information
- Born: May 24, 2003 (age 23)
- Listed height: 6 ft 3 in (1.91 m)
- Listed weight: 257 lb (117 kg)

Career information
- High school: Center Grove (Greenwood, Indiana)
- College: Ohio State (2022–2025)
- NFL draft: 2026: 6th round, 214th overall pick

Career history
- Indianapolis Colts (2026–present)

Awards and highlights
- CFP national champion (2024); First-team All-Big Ten (2025)

Career NFL statistics as of Week 10, 2026
- Total tackles: 23
- Sacks: 1.0
- Fumble recoveries: 2
- Stats at Pro Football Reference

Caden Curry (born May 24, 2003) is an American professional football defensive end for the Indianapolis Colts of the National Football League (NFL). He played college football for the Ohio State Buckeyes and was selected by the Colts in the sixth round of the 2026 NFL draft.

== Early life ==
Curry attended Center Grove High School in Greenwood, Indiana. As a senior, he tallied 65 tackles, with 24 tackles for a loss and seven sacks, as he helped lead his school to a state title. Curry finished his career with a total of 290 tackles, with 83.5 tackles for a loss and 28 sacks, while helping his school win back-to-back Indiana state championships. He also played baseball and helped lead the team to a state title appearance.

Coming out of high school, Curry was rated as a four-star recruit and committed to play college football for the Ohio State Buckeyes over Alabama and Indiana.

== College career ==
Heading into his freshman season in 2022, Curry competed for a starting spot on the Ohio State defense. In week 2 of the season, he notched four tackles with one being for a loss in a win over Arkansas State. Curry played just 81 defensive snaps on the season while also contributing on special teams, finishing with 14 tackles with two being for a loss, and half a sack. In 2023, he appeared in 11 games for the Buckeyes, where he notched nine tackles with three and a half being for a loss, a sack and a half, and a pass deflection. In addition to playing defensive end, Curry also played sparingly as a fullback. In week 4 of the 2024 season, he was ejected for targeting in a win over Marshall. In week 11, Curry blocked a punt in a 45–0 win over Purdue.

== Professional career ==
Pre-draft measurables
Height	Weight	Arm length	Hand span	Wingspan	20-yard shuttle	Three-cone drill	Bench press
6 ft 2 3/4 in (1.90 m)	257 lb (117 kg)	30 1/8 in (0.77 m)	9 3/8 in (0.24 m)	6 ft 4 in (1.93 m)	4.51 s	7.22 s	26 reps
All values from NFL Combine/Pro Day

Curry was selected by the Indianapolis Colts in the sixth round with the 214th overall pick of the 2026 NFL draft. He signed his rookie contract on May 8.
