= Beau Atkinson =

American football player (born 2004)

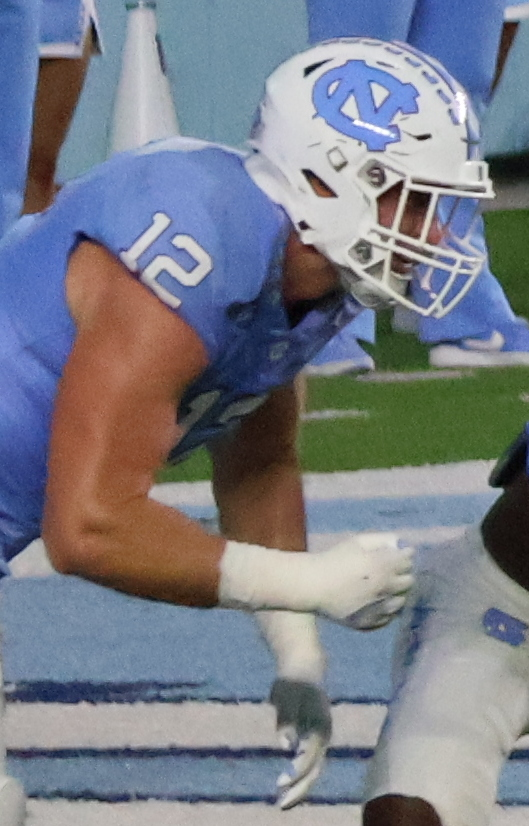
- Atkinson with North Carolina in 2024

No. 12 – Ohio State Buckeyes
- Position: Defensive end
- Class: Redshirt Senior

Personal information
- Born: June 16, 2004 (age 22)
- Listed height: 6 ft 6 in (1.98 m)
- Listed weight: 258 lb (117 kg)

Career information
- High school: Leesville Road (Raleigh, North Carolina)
- College: North Carolina (2022–2024); Ohio State (2025–present)
- Stats at ESPN

Beau Atkinson (born June 16, 2004) is an American college football defensive end for the Ohio State Buckeyes. He previously played for the North Carolina Tar Heels.

== Early life ==
Atkinson attended Leesville Road High School in Raleigh, North Carolina. Atkinson was rated as a four-star recruit and committed to play college football for the North Carolina Tar Heels over offers from schools such as Miami, Michigan, NC State, Penn State, Virginia, and Virginia Tech.

== College career ==
=== North Carolina ===
In his first two collegiate seasons in 2022 and 2023, Atkinson appeared in 13 games and notched 19 tackles with four and a half being for a loss, three and a half sacks, and a forced fumble. In week 10 of the 2024 season, he notched four and a half tackles for a loss, and three and a half sacks, in a win over Florida State, earning Atlantic Coast Conference (ACC) defensive lineman of the week honors.

On April 16, 2025, Atkinson entered the NCAA transfer portal.

=== Ohio State ===
On April 23, 2025, Atkinson announced he would transfer to Ohio State.
