= Devin Brown (American football) =

American football player (born 2003)

No. 33 – Weber State Wildcats
- Position: Quarterback
- Class: Redshirt Junior

Personal information
- Born: October 13, 2003 (age 23)
- Listed height: 6 ft 3 in (1.91 m)
- Listed weight: 215 lb (98 kg)

Career information
- High school: Corner Canyon (Draper, Utah)
- College: Ohio State (2022–2024); California (2025); Weber State (2026–present)

Awards and highlights
- CFP national champion (2024)
- Stats at ESPN

Devin Brown (born October 13, 2003) is an American college football quarterback for the Weber State Wildcats. He previously played for the Ohio State Buckeyes and California Golden Bears.

== Early life ==
Brown grew up in Gilbert, Arizona and initially attended Queen Creek High School, where he was coached by former Ohio State and NFL quarterback Joe Germaine. He passed for 1,319 yards and 10 touchdowns in eight games during his sophomore season. He moved to Draper, Utah and transferred to Corner Canyon High School prior to the start of his senior year. As a senior, Brown passed for 4,881 yards with 57 touchdown passes while also rushing for 430 yards and eight touchdowns.

Brown was initially rated a three-star recruit and committed to play college football at USC during his junior year. He later decommitted during his senior year after the firing of USC head coach Clay Helton. Brown ultimately signed to play at Ohio State.

== College career ==
=== Ohio State ===
Brown enrolled at Ohio State in January 2022. He appeared in two games during his true freshman season before redshirting the year. He began the season as the third-string quarterback behind C. J. Stroud and Kyle McCord. He made his collegiate debut in a Week 3 victory against Toledo.

Brown initially competed with McCord to succeed Stroud as Ohio State's starting quarterback during spring practices before suffering a finger injury that required surgery. He resumed the competition during preseason training camp. McCord was named the starter for the Buckeyes' season opener, although head coach Ryan Day stated that the competition was still ongoing. After seeing some playing time in the season opener against Indiana and in the second game against Youngstown State, Day announced that McCord would be the starter for the remainder of the 2023 season. In Week 3 of the 2023 season, Brown threw his first collegiate touchdown pass against Western Kentucky in a 63–10 victory. The following week against Purdue, he recorded his first collegiate rushing touchdown and added a 58-yard touchdown pass to Brandon Inniss in Ohio State's 41–7 victory. After Ohio State's loss to rival Michigan, McCord entered the transfer portal before the Cotton Bowl. Brown was named the starter against Missouri, completing four of six pass attempts for 20 yards before suffering an ankle injury on a sack in the first half. He left the game in the second quarter and was replaced by Lincoln Kienholz for the remainder of Ohio State's 14–3 loss to Missouri.

Brown lost the starting quarterback competition to transfer Will Howard ahead of the 2024 season. He later shared backup duties with Julian Sayin behind Howard. On December 8, Brown announced that he would enter the transfer portal, but remained with Ohio State through its run in the College Football Playoff. He appeared in the Buckeyes' first-round victory over Tennessee as Ohio State went on to win the National Championship. During the 2024 season, Brown completed 11 of 20 passes for 120 yards and one touchdown in nine games. In three seasons at Ohio State, he appeared in 17 games with one start, completing 27 of 48 passes for 331 yards, three touchdowns, and one interception. He also rushed for 37 yards and one touchdown.

=== California ===
On January 21, 2025, it was announced that Brown had transferred to California. Brown lost the starting quarterback competition to true freshman Jaron-Keawe Sagapolutele. He made his debut for the Golden Bears in the season opener against Oregon State, seeing limited playing time. The following week against Texas Southern, he threw a touchdown pass in a 35–3 victory. Brown appeared in nine games during the regular season, completing four of seven pass attempts for 48 yards, one touchdown, and one interception. On December 31, 2025, it was announced that Brown would enter the transfer portal for a second time.

=== Weber State ===
On January 16, 2026, Brown signed with FCS program Weber State. He reportedly turned down significantly larger NIL offers from Power Four programs to sign with Weber State for $2,000. The move reunited him with his former high school coach at Corner Canyon High School, Eric Kjar, who was entering his first season as Weber State's head coach. Brown was named the starting quarterback for the 2026 season opener against Northern Colorado. He completed 10 of 20 passes for 179 yards, two touchdowns and an interception before dislocating his right pinky finger and leaving the game in the third quarter of the 30–29 victory.

=== Statistics ===
| Season | Team | Games | | | Passing | | | | | | | | Rushing | | | |
| Season | Team | GP | GS | Record | Comp | Att | Pct | Yards | Avg | TD | Int | Rate | Att | Yards | Avg | TD |
|---|---|---|---|---|---|---|---|---|---|---|---|---|---|---|---|---|
| 2022 | Ohio State | 2 | 0 | — | 0 | 0 | 0.0 | 0 | 0.0 | 0 | 0 | 0.0 | 1 | 1 | 1.0 | 0 |
| 2023 | Ohio State | 6 | 1 | 0–1 | 16 | 28 | 57.1 | 217 | 7.8 | 2 | 1 | 138.7 | 22 | 23 | 1.0 | 1 |
| 2024 | Ohio State | 9 | 0 | — | 11 | 20 | 55.0 | 114 | 5.7 | 1 | 0 | 119.4 | 7 | 13 | 1.9 | 0 |
| 2025 | California | 9 | 0 | — | 4 | 7 | 57.1 | 48 | 6.9 | 1 | 1 | 133.3 | 3 | −15 | −5.0 | 0 |
| 2026 | Weber State | 0 | 0 | — | | | | | | | | | | | | |
| FBS career | | 26 | 1 | 0–1 | 31 | 55 | 56.4 | 379 | 6.9 | 4 | 2 | 131.0 | 33 | 22 | 0.7 | 1 |
| FCS career | | 0 | 0 | 0–0 | | | | | | | | | | | | |
