= Nate Roberts (American football) =

American football player

No. 83 – Ohio State Buckeyes
- Position: Tight end
- Class: Sophomore

Personal information
- Listed height: 6 ft 5 in (1.96 m)
- Listed weight: 240 lb (109 kg)

Career information
- High school: Washington (Washington, Oklahoma)
- College: Ohio State (2025–present)
- Stats at ESPN

Nate Roberts is an American football tight end for the Ohio State Buckeyes.

== Early life ==
Roberts attended Washington High School in Washington, Oklahoma. He was rated as a four-star recruit and the ninth overall tight end in the class of 2025 by 247Sports. Roberts committed to play college football for the Notre Dame Fighting Irish over offers from Alabama, Florida, Florida State, Georgia, Miami, Michigan, Texas, Ohio State, Oklahoma State, and Wisconsin. However, he de-committed from the Fighting Irish and committed to play for the Ohio State Buckeyes.

== College career ==
Heading into his freshman season in 2025, Roberts was the team's primary fullback. He finished the season with four catches for 30 yards in 13 games played. Roberts entered the 2026 season as the Buckeyes' starting tight end.
