= TJ Alford =

American football player (born 2006)

No. 17 – Ohio State Buckeyes
- Position: Linebacker
- Class: Sophomore

Personal information
- Born: November 29, 2006 (age 19)
- Listed height: 6 ft 1 in (1.85 m)
- Listed weight: 237 lb (108 kg)

Career information
- High school: Vero Beach (Vero Beach, Florida)
- College: Ohio State (2025–present)
- Stats at ESPN

Tarvos "TJ" Alford II (born November 29, 2006) is an American college football linebacker for the Ohio State Buckeyes.

== Early life ==
Alford attended John Carroll High School in Fort Pierce, Florida before transferring to Vero Beach High School in Vero Beach, Florida before his junior year. As a junior in 2023, he was the TCPalm Defensive Player of the Year after recording 114 tackles and four sacks. Alford was selected to play in the Navy All-American Bowl. He committed to Ohio State University to play college football.

== College career ==
Alford played in 11 games his first year at Ohio State in 2025, recording six tackles. He recorded an interception in the first game of the 2026 season against Ball State.
