= Bo Jackson (2020s running back) =

American football player

No. 25 – Ohio State Buckeyes
- Position: Running back
- Class: Sophomore

Personal information
- Listed height: 6 ft 0 in (1.83 m)
- Listed weight: 217 lb (98 kg)

Career information
- High school: Villa Angela-St. Joseph (Cleveland, Ohio)
- College: Ohio State (2025–present)

Awards and highlights
- Second-team All-Big Ten (2025)
- Stats at ESPN

Lamar "Bo" Jackson is an American college football running back for the Ohio State Buckeyes.

== Early life ==
Jackson attended Villa Angela-St. Joseph High School in Cleveland, Ohio. As a junior, he tallied 114 carries for 1,700 yards and 28 touchdowns. Coming out of high school, Jackson was rated as a four-star recruit, the 8th best running back, and the 101st overall player in the class of 2025. Jackson committed to play college football for the Ohio State Buckeyes over offers from schools such as Alabama, Auburn, Florida, Georgia, Kentucky, Michigan, Notre Dame, Ole Miss and Tennessee.

== College career ==
During Jackson's freshman year at Ohio State, he rushed for over 1,000 yards in the 2025 season.

=== College statistics ===
Season	Games		Rushing				Receiving			
Season	GP	GS	Att	Yds	Avg	TD	Rec	Yds	Avg	TD
2025	13	13	179	1,090	6.1	6	19	200	10.5	1
2026	7	7	107	516	4.8	4	11	71	6.5	1
Career	20	20	286	1,606	5.6	10	30	271	9.0	2
