= Lorenzo Styles =

American football player and coach (born 1974)

Bowling Green Falcons
- Title: Defensive analyst

Personal information
- Born: January 31, 1974 (age 52); Sharon, Pennsylvania, U.S.
- Listed height: 6 ft 1 in (1.85 m)
- Listed weight: 245 lb (111 kg)

Career information
- High school: Farrell (PA)
- College: Ohio State
- NFL draft: 1995: 3rd round, 77th overall pick

Career history

Playing
- Atlanta Falcons (1995–1996); St. Louis Rams (1997–2000)

Coaching
- Ohio Dominican University (2010–2011) Linebackers coach; Marion Mayhem (2010) Defensive line coach; Dayton Silverbacks (2011) Defensive coordinator & defensive backs coach; Marion Blue Racers (2012) Head coach; Bowling Green Defensive analyst

Awards and highlights
- Super Bowl champion (XXXIV); 2× First-team All-Big Ten (1993, 1994)

Career NFL statistics
- Tackles: 94
- Sacks: 1
- Fumble recoveries: 1
- Stats at Pro Football Reference

Lorenzo Cavelle Styles Sr. (born January 31, 1974) is an American former professional football player who was a linebacker for six seasons with the Atlanta Falcons and St. Louis Rams of the National Football League (NFL). He spent half a season as the head coach of the Marion Blue Racers. Styles is the father of football players Lorenzo Styles Jr. and Sonny Styles.

== Early life ==
As a prep star at Farrell High School in Farrell, Pennsylvania from 1990 and 1991, Styles was inducted into the Mercer County Hall of Fame. He also attended Independence High School in Columbus, Ohio

== College career ==
Styles played three seasons at linebacker for Ohio State. He forsook his senior season as a Buckeye to enter the 1995 NFL draft. Styles returned to Ohio State to officially finish his degree, graduating in 2025.

== Professional career ==
=== Atlanta Falcons ===
Styles was selected 77th overall in the third round of the 1995 NFL Draft by the Atlanta Falcons. He played for two seasons with the Falcons as linebacker and on special teams.

=== St. Louis Rams ===
Styles was traded to the St. Louis Rams in 1996, where he would play the final four seasons of his NFL career as a linebacker and special teams player. Styles was a member of the Rams team that won Super Bowl XXXIV.

== Coaching career ==
=== Ohio Dominican ===
In 2009 and 2010, Styles was the linebackers' coach for the Ohio Dominican University Panthers.

=== Marion Mayhem ===
In 2010, Styles was named the defensive line coach for the Marion Mayhem, an indoor football team in the Continental Indoor Football League. There he worked with league sack record holder, Thomas McKenzie. The Mayhem lacked financial stability and were unable to finish the season. McKenzie went on to play for the Fort Wayne FireHawks, and was named 1st Team All-CIFL.

=== Dayton Silverbacks ===
In 2011, Styles became the defensive coordinator and defensive backs coach for the Dayton Silverbacks, also of the CIFL. The Silverbacks went on to the playoffs as the 3rd best team in the league. Chris Respress won the Defensive Player of the Year after playing under Styles.

=== Marion Blue Racers ===
On August 17, 2011, Styles was named the head coach for the Marion Blue Racers for the 2012 season. He led the Blue Racers into their first year as a member of the United Indoor Football League.

=== Pickerington Central Tigers ===
In 2012, Styles became outside linebacker coach for the Pickerington Central Tigers, a high school football team in the OCC (Ohio Capital Conference), and was on staff as the Tigers won Division I state championships in 2017 and 2019. In the 2019 state championship game, Styles' son Lorenzo Jr., who later signed with Notre Dame, caught the game-winning touchdown pass.

== Personal life ==
Styles has two sons, cornerback Lorenzo Styles Jr. and linebacker Sonny Styles. Both Sonny and Lorenzo Jr. were a part of Ohio State's 2024 national championship team.
