= Lorenzo Styles Jr. =

American football player (born 2002)

No. 36 – New Orleans Saints
- Position: Safety
- Roster status: Active

Personal information
- Born: September 9, 2002 (age 24); Columbus, Ohio, U.S.
- Listed height: 6 ft 0 in (1.83 m)
- Listed weight: 194 lb (88 kg)

Career information
- High school: Pickerington Central (Pickerington, Ohio)
- College: Notre Dame (2021–2022); Ohio State (2023–2025)
- NFL draft: 2026: 5th round, 172nd overall pick

Career history
- New Orleans Saints (2026–present)

Awards and highlights
- CFP national champion (2024)

Career NFL statistics as of Week 7, 2026
- Total tackles: 2
- Stats at Pro Football Reference

Lorenzo Cavelle Styles Jr. (born September 9, 2002) is an American professional football safety for the New Orleans Saints of the National Football League (NFL). Styles played college football for the Notre Dame Fighting Irish and Ohio State Buckeyes and was selected by the Saints in the fifth round of the 2026 NFL draft. He is the son of former NFL linebacker Lorenzo Styles and the older brother of linebacker Sonny Styles.

== Early life ==
Styles Jr. was born on September 9, 2002, in Columbus, Ohio. He attended high school at Pickerington Central located in Pickerington, Ohio. In high school, Styles won two football State titles with Tigers in 2017 and 2019. In 2019's state championship game, Styles caught the game-winning touchdown to defeat their opponent Elder. Coming out of high school, he committed to play college football for the Notre Dame Fighting Irish.

== College career ==
=== Notre Dame ===
During the 2022 Fiesta Bowl, he notched eight receptions for 136 yards and a touchdown, in a loss to Oklahoma State to end the 2021 season. In week one of the 2022 season, Styles hauled in a career long 54 yard reception in a loss to Ohio State. After the conclusion of the 2022 season, he decided to enter his name into the NCAA transfer portal. Styles finished his two year career with the Fighting Irish from 2021 through 2022, recording 54 receptions for 684 yards and two touchdowns, while also rushing for 86 yards.

=== Ohio State ===
Styles transferred to play for the Ohio State Buckeyes with his younger brother Sonny Styles. Ahead of his first season he switched from wide receiver to defensive back, playing at both cornerback and safety. During the 2023 season, Styles used the season to redshirt after just playing on special teams. He finished the 2024 season, recording 16 tackles and four pass deflections, as he helped Ohio State to a national championship win.

=== Statistics ===
Year	Team	GP	Tackles				Interceptions				Fumbles			Receiving			
Year	Team	GP	Total	Solo	Ast	Sack	PD	Int	Yds	TD	FF	FR	TD	Rec	Yds	Avg	TD
2021	Notre Dame	13	0	0	0	0.0	0	0	0	0	0	0	0	24	344	14.3	1
2022	Notre Dame	13	1	1	0	0.0	0	0	0	0	0	0	0	30	340	11.3	1
2023	Ohio State	6	0	0	0	0.0	0	0	0	0	0	0	0	0	0	–	0
2024	Ohio State	16	16	10	6	0.0	4	0	0	0	0	0	0	0	0	–	0
2025	Ohio State	12	30	18	12	0.0	3	0	0	0	0	0	0	0	0	–	0
Career		60	47	29	18	0.0	7	0	0	0	0	0	0	54	684	12.7	2

== Professional career ==
Pre-draft measurables
Height	Weight	Arm length	Hand span	Wingspan	40-yard dash	10-yard split	20-yard split	Vertical jump
6 ft 0 1/2 in (1.84 m)	194 lb (88 kg)	31 5/8 in (0.80 m)	9 1/2 in (0.24 m)	6 ft 5 5/8 in (1.97 m)	4.27 s	1.49 s	2.49 s	39.0 in (0.99 m)
All values from NFL Combine

Styles was selected by the New Orleans Saints in the fifth round, 172nd overall, of the 2026 NFL draft. On September 1, 2026, Styles was placed on injured reserve due to a calf injury suffered in a preseason matchup against the Los Angeles Rams. He was activated on October 10.

== Personal life ==
Styles is the son of former NFL linebacker Lorenzo Styles and the older brother of linebacker Sonny Styles, who was drafted seventh overall the same year by the Washington Commanders.
