= Sonny Styles =

American football player (born 2004)

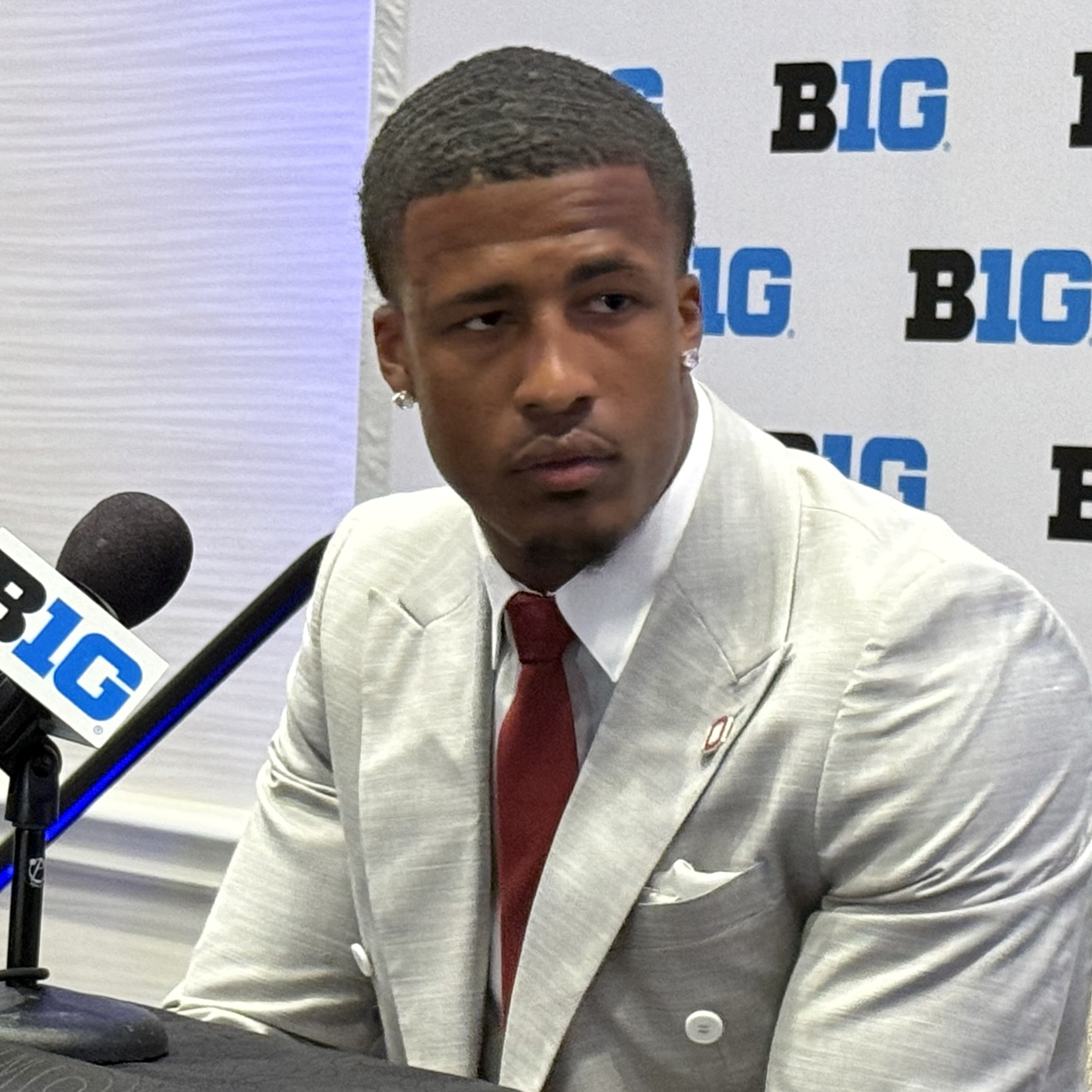
- Styles in 2025

No. 52 – Washington Commanders
- Position: Linebacker
- Roster status: Active

Personal information
- Born: November 24, 2004 (age 21); Columbus, Ohio, U.S.
- Listed height: 6 ft 5 in (1.96 m)
- Listed weight: 243 lb (110 kg)

Career information
- High school: Pickerington Central (Pickerington, Ohio)
- College: Ohio State (2022–2025)
- NFL draft: 2026: 1st round, 7th overall pick

Career history
- Washington Commanders (2026–present)

Awards and highlights
- CFP national champion (2024); First-team All-American (2025); First-team All-Big Ten (2025); Second-team All-Big Ten (2024)

Career NFL statistics as of Week 10, 2026
- Tackles: 80
- Sacks: 1.0
- Forced fumbles: 1
- Pass deflections: 4
- Interceptions: 1
- Stats at Pro Football Reference

Alexander "Sonny" Styles (born November 24, 2004) is an American professional football linebacker for the Washington Commanders of the National Football League (NFL). Styles played college football for the Ohio State Buckeyes, winning the 2024 national championship prior to being selected seventh overall by the Commanders in the 2026 NFL draft. He is the son of former NFL linebacker Lorenzo Styles and the younger brother of defensive back Lorenzo Styles Jr.

== Early life ==
Styles was born on November 24, 2004, in Columbus, Ohio. He attended Pickerington High School Central in Pickerington, Ohio, where he played safety and recorded 88 tackles, a sack, two pass deflections, six interceptions, and a forced fumble during his career. In a 2020 televised game against rival Pickerington North, he had nine tackles, an interception, and a blocked punt. Rated a five-star recruit, he committed to play college football for the Buckeyes of Ohio State University. Styles also played basketball in high school, winning the 2022 Ohio High School Athletic Association (OHSAA) state championship.

== College career ==
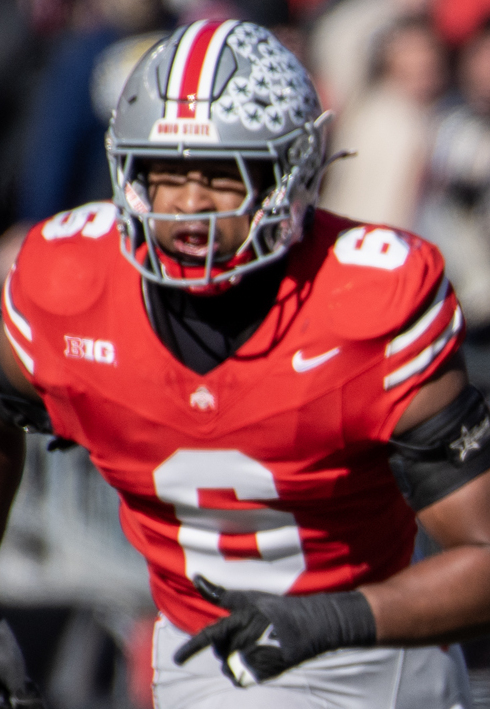
Styles with the Ohio State Buckeyes in 2024

Styles recorded nine tackles as a reserve strong safety for the Ohio State Buckeyes as a freshman in 2022. He was named the starter ahead of the 2023 season and was named player of the game in the season opener against the Indiana Hoosiers. He converted to linebacker in 2024, helping the Buckeyes win a national championship that season and earning second-team All-Big Ten honors after recording 100 tackles and six sacks. In 2025, Styles was named a defensive co-captain along with Caleb Downs and was the recipient of the team's Block O jersey number honor. He earned All-American honors by The Sporting News after recording over 80 tackles, an interception, and a forced fumble.

College statistics
Year	Team	G	Tackles						Interceptions			
Year	Team	G	Cmb	Solo	Ast	TFL	Sck	FF	Int	Yds	TD	PD
2022	Ohio State	10	9	5	4	1	–	–	–	–	–	–
2023	Ohio State	13	53	32	21	4.5	2	1	–	–	–	1
2024	Ohio State	16	100	48	52	10.5	6	1	–	–	–	5
2025	Ohio State	14	82	46	36	6.5	1	1	1	5	–	3
Career		53	244	131	113	22.5	9	3	1	5	0	9

== Professional career ==
Pre-draft measurables
Height	Weight	Arm length	Hand span	Wingspan	40-yard dash	10-yard split	20-yard split	20-yard shuttle	Three-cone drill	Vertical jump	Broad jump
6 ft 5 in (1.96 m)	244 lb (111 kg)	32 7/8 in (0.84 m)	10 in (0.25 m)	6 ft 8 7/8 in (2.05 m)	4.46 s	1.56 s	2.62 s	4.26 s	7.09 s	43.5 in (1.10 m)	11 ft 2 in (3.40 m)
All values from NFL Combine

Styles' performance at the 2026 NFL Scouting Combine was considered among the best at his position in its history, with him being the only player at his size since 2003 to record a sub-4.5 second 40-yard dash, a 40+ inch vertical jump, and an 11+ foot broad jump. He was selected by the Washington Commanders seventh overall in the 2026 NFL draft and signed his four-year rookie contract, worth $37.2 million, on May 8, 2026. Styles chose the uniform number 52 after linebackers Ray Lewis and Patrick Willis, who were influences on him growing up. In Week 3 against the Seattle Seahawks, Styles posted five tackles, a QB hit, two pass breakups, a forced fumble and an interception, earning him NFC Defensive Player of the Week.

NFL statistics
Year	Team	Games		Tackles					Interceptions				Fumbles				
Year	Team	GP	GS	Cmb	Solo	Ast	Sck	TFL	Int	Yds	TD	PD	FF	Fmb	FR	Yds	TD
2026	WAS	9	9	80	37	43	1.0	5	1	-1	0	4	1	0	0	0	0
Career		8	8	80	37	43	1.0	5	1	-1	0	4	1	0	0	0	0

== Personal life ==
Styles is the son of former NFL linebacker Lorenzo Styles and the younger brother of defensive back Lorenzo Styles Jr., who was drafted the same year in the fifth round by the New Orleans Saints. He was given the nickname of Sonny after the character Sonny Corleone from The Godfather film franchise by his father because of tantrums towards his brother as a young child. Styles graduated from Ohio State in December 2025 with a degree in sport industry.
