= Ohio State Buckeyes football =

Football team of Ohio State University

2026 Ohio State Buckeyes football team
- First season: 1890; 136 years ago
- Athletic director: Ross Bjork
- General manager: Mark Pantoni
- Head coach: Ryan Day; 8th season, 89–16 (.848)
- Location: Columbus, Ohio
- Stadium: Ohio Stadium (capacity: 102,780)
- Field: Safelite Field
- NCAA division: Division I FBS
- Conference: Big Ten
- Colors: Scarlet and gray
- All-time record: 997–342–53 (.735)
- CFP record: 7–5 (.583)
- Bowl record: 29–29 (.500)

National championships
- Claimed: 1942, 1954, 1957, 1961, 1968, 1970, 2002, 2014, 2024
- Unclaimed: 1933, 1944, 1969, 1973, 1974, 1975, 1998

National finalist
- Poll era: 1968, 1972
- BCS: 2002, 2006, 2007
- CFP: 2014, 2020, 2024

College Football Playoff appearances
- 2014, 2016, 2019, 2020, 2022, 2024, 2025

Conference championships
- OAC: 1906, 1912 Big Ten: 1916, 1917, 1920, 1935, 1939, 1942, 1944, 1949, 1954, 1955, 1957, 1961, 1968, 1969, 1970, 1972, 1973, 1974, 1975, 1976, 1977, 1979, 1981, 1984, 1986, 1993, 1996, 1998, 2002, 2005, 2006, 2007, 2008, 2009, 2014, 2017, 2018, 2019, 2020

Division championships
- Big Ten Leaders: 2012, 2013 Big Ten East: 2014, 2015, 2016, 2017, 2018, 2019, 2020, 2021
- Heisman winners: Les Horvath – 1944; Vic Janowicz – 1950; Howard Cassady – 1955; Archie Griffin – 1974; Archie Griffin – 1975; Eddie George – 1995; Troy Smith – 2006
- Consensus All-Americans: 97
- Rivalries: See § Rivalries: Michigan (rivalry); Penn State (rivalry); Illinois (rivalry)

Uniforms
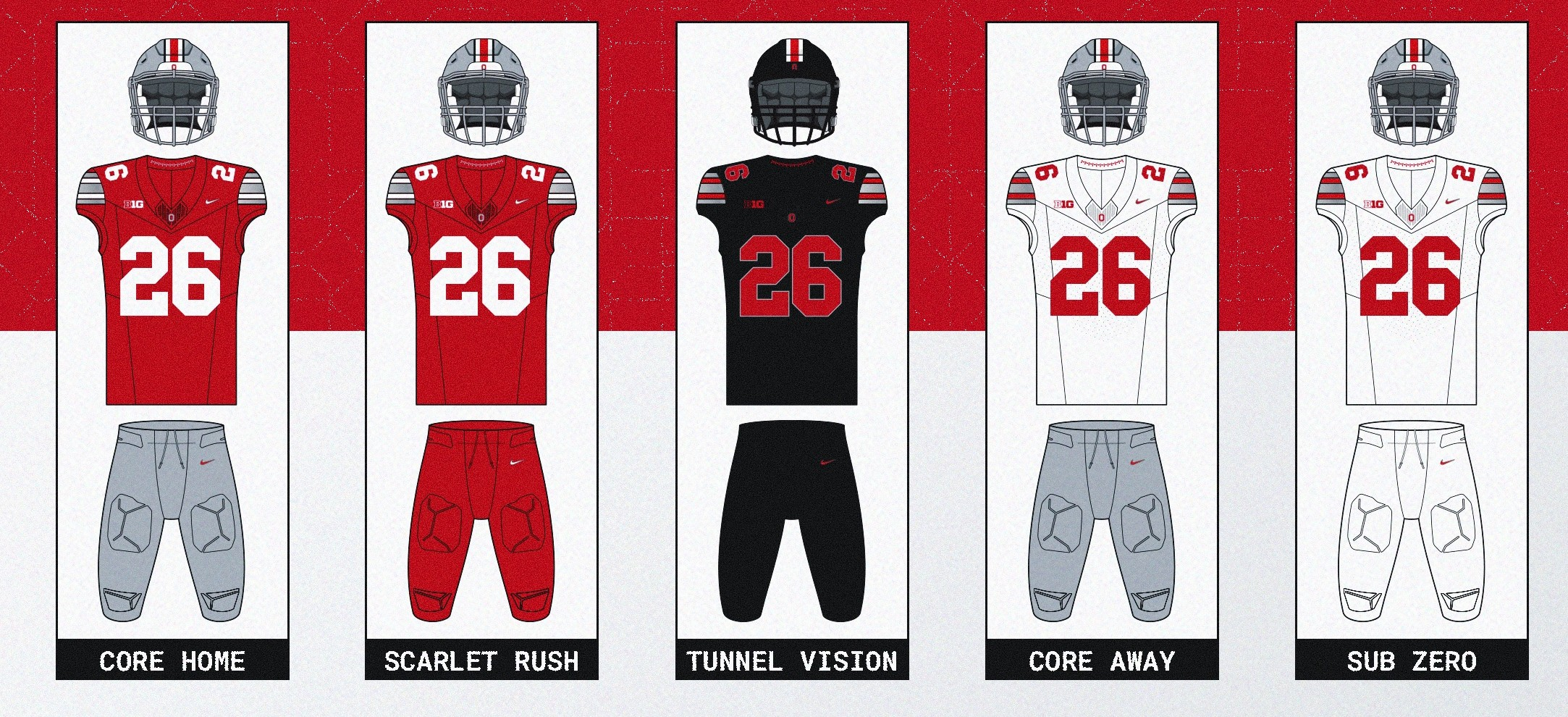
- Fight song: Across the Field and Buckeye Battle Cry
- Mascot: Brutus Buckeye
- Marching band: Ohio State University Marching Band
- Outfitter: Nike
- Website: ohiostatebuckeyes.com

The Ohio State Buckeyes football team represents the Ohio State University in American football. They compete in the NCAA Division I Football Bowl Subdivision (FBS) as a member of the Big Ten Conference. The 102,780 person capacity Ohio Stadium, located on campus in Columbus, has been the Buckeyes' home field since 1922.

The Buckeyes claim nine national championships including seven from the major wire-service selectors: AP Poll or Coaches' Poll. The program has also captured 41 conference championships (2 OAC and 39 Big Ten), 10 division championships, and has compiled 10 undefeated seasons, including six perfect seasons (no losses or ties). Seven players have received the Heisman Trophy (second all-time), with the program holding the distinction of having the only two-time winner (Archie Griffin) of the award.

As of 2025, the Ohio State football program was valued at $2–2.5 billion, the highest valuation of any such program in the country. Notable team symbols include the Brutus Buckeye mascot and two fight songs: "Across the Field" and "Buckeye Battle Cry". Ohio State's most important rivalry is with the Michigan Wolverines.

== History ==
=== Early history (1890–1940) ===
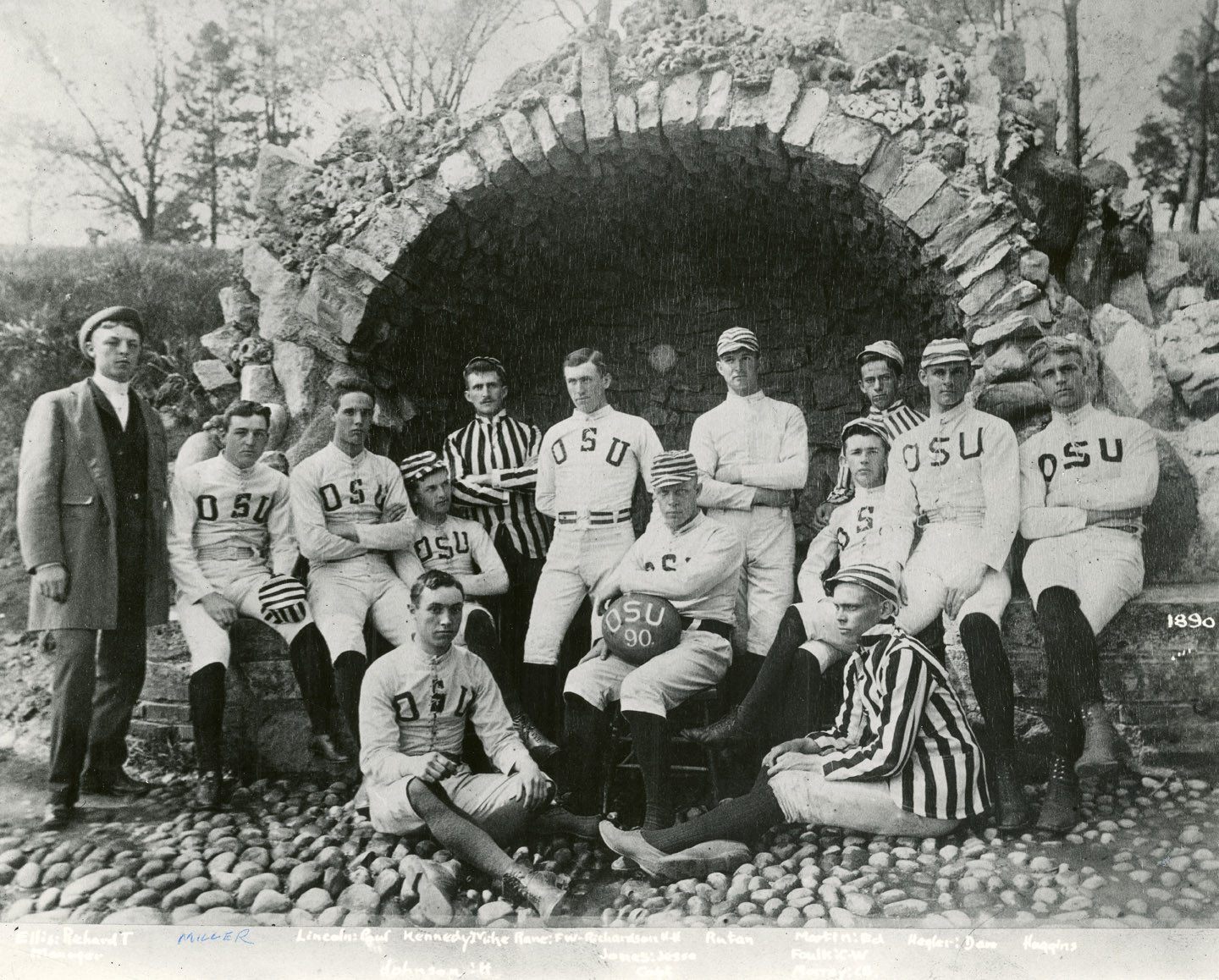
The first Ohio State football team of 1890

After early attempts at forming a team in 1886 (led by future Nebraska governor Chester Hardy Aldrich) and 1887, football was ultimately established at the university in 1890. On the site of the first OSU game, on the campus of Ohio Wesleyan University in Delaware, Ohio, on May 3, 1890, the Delaware County Historical Society has set a historical marker. Some histories of Ohio State football credit George Cole, an undergraduate, and Alexander S. Lilley with introducing the sport to the campus. More recent research has challenged that claim, stating that George Cole did not persuade Lilley to coach the football team until after its first full season began that fall. OSU's first home game took place at 2:30 p.m. on November 1, 1890. They played the University of Wooster on the site that was then called Recreation Park. Just east of historic German Village, the park occupied the north side of Schiller (now Whittier), between Ebner and Jaeger, in what is now Schumacher Place. OSU lost the game, 64–0. Over the next eight years, under a number of coaches, the team played to a cumulative record of 31 wins, 39 losses, and 2 ties. The first game against the University of Michigan, in Ann Arbor, was a 34–0 loss in 1897, a year that saw the low point in Buckeye football history with a 1–7–1 record. Jack Ryder was Ohio State's first paid coach, earning $150 per season, and lost his first game, against Oberlin College and John Heisman, on October 15, 1892. In 1899 the university hired John Eckstorm to bring professional coaching skills to the program and immediately went undefeated. In 1901, however, center John Sigrist was fatally injured in a game against Western Reserve University and the continuation of football at Ohio State was in serious question. Although the school's athletic board let the team decide its future, Eckstorm resigned. In 1912, football underwent a number of developments that included joining the Western Conference, making football as part of a new Department of Athletics, and hiring Lynn W. St. John to be athletic director.

Chic Harley attended East High in Columbus and was regarded as one of the greatest players to attend an Ohio high school. A well-rounded player, Harley came to Ohio State in 1916 and instantly became a fan favorite. Harley and the Buckeyes won the first Big Ten championship in school history in 1916, finishing 7–0. The team would repeat in 1917, finishing 8–0–1. In 1918, Harley left to be a pilot in the U.S. Army Air Service during World War I. With Harley's return in 1919, the Buckeyes would only lose one game, to Illinois. Harley left OSU with a career record of 22–1–1. At the time, OSU played at the small Ohio Field and Harley brought such record crowds it became necessary to open Ohio Stadium in 1922. The stadium was built entirely on fan donations and several stadium drives around the city where Harley would often appear. In 1951, when the College Football Hall of Fame opened, Harley was inducted as an inaugural member. Ohio State's first rival was Kenyon College, a small liberal arts college in Gambier, roughly 50 miles to the northeast. The Buckeyes first played them in their first season in 1890 on Nov 27, Kenyon won the first two meetings; however, Ohio State won 15 in a row and the rivalry diminished. Kenyon made it their season goal to defeat OSU. After the Bucks joined the Big Ten they stopped playing Kenyon. The all-time record stands at 17–6, OSU. In hiring Francis Schmidt in March 1934 to coach its football team, Ohio State moved its program to a "big-time" level of competition. Schmidt was a well-established coach and an acknowledged offensive innovator. His offensive schemes were a "wide-open" style called "razzle-dazzle" and led him to be the first Buckeye football coach granted a multi-year contract. Schmidt's first four seasons saw victories over archrival Michigan, all by shutout. The 1935 squad went 7–1, its sole loss was to Notre Dame, 18–13, in the first contest between the programs. However, Schmidt's remaining seasons were less successful, except in 1939 when the Buckeyes won the Big Ten championship, and his popularity faded for a number of reasons. On December 17, 1940, he resigned.

=== Paul Brown era (1941–1943) ===
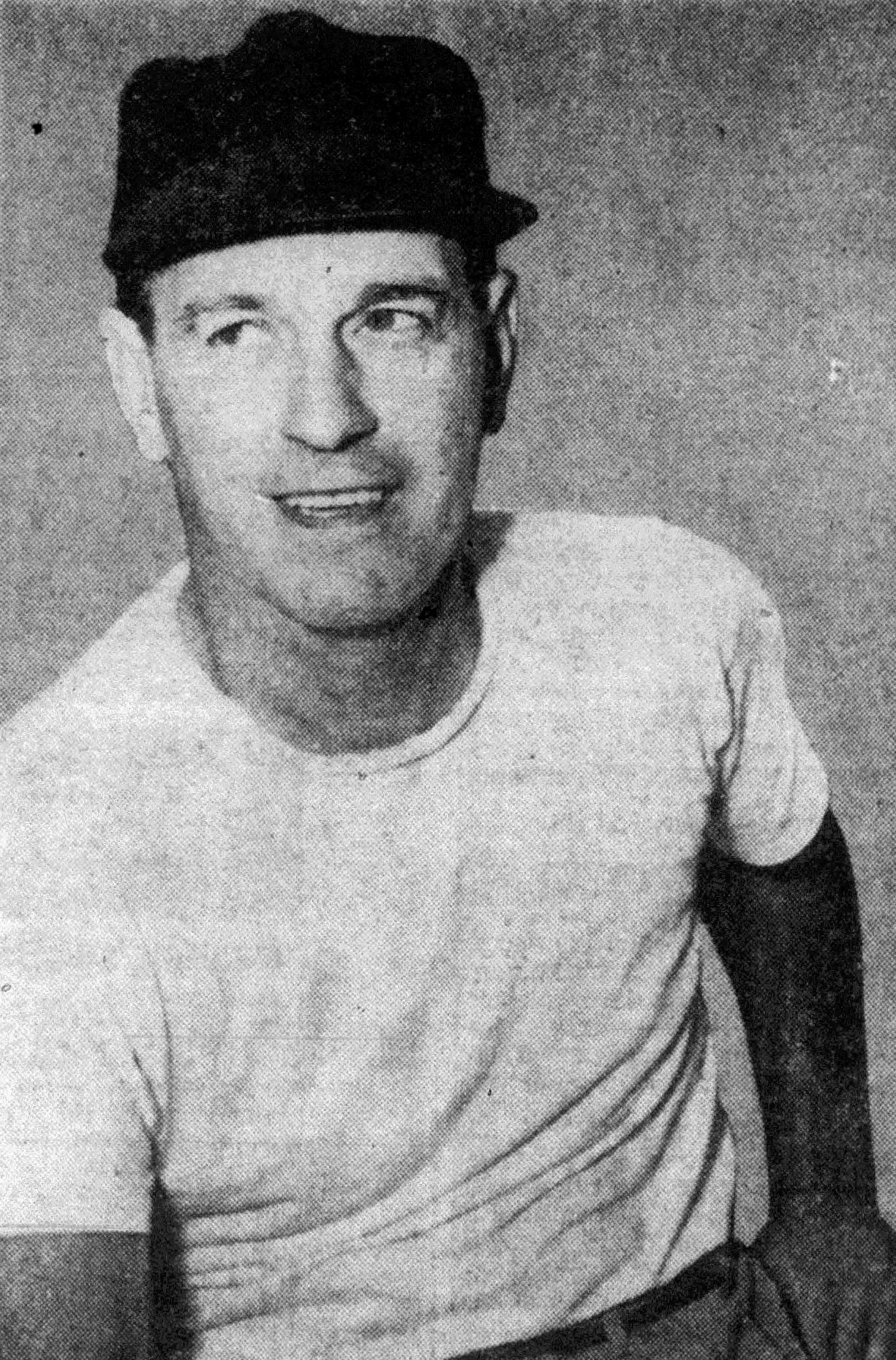
Paul Brown (shown here as head coach of the Cleveland Browns) led the Buckeyes to their first national championship in 1942.

Ohio State hired the coach of Massillon Washington High School football team, Paul Brown, to succeed Schmidt. Brown's Tigers had just won their sixth straight state championship. Brown immediately changed Ohio State's style of offense, planned and organized his program in great detail, and delegated to his assistant coaches using highly structured practices.

In 1942, Ohio State lost 22 veteran players to military service as the United States joined World War II, and with a team of mostly sophomores, went on to lose only once in winning its first national championship. Brown accepted a commission in the United States Navy in 1944, ending his coaching run prior to the season.

=== Team in flux (1944–1950) ===
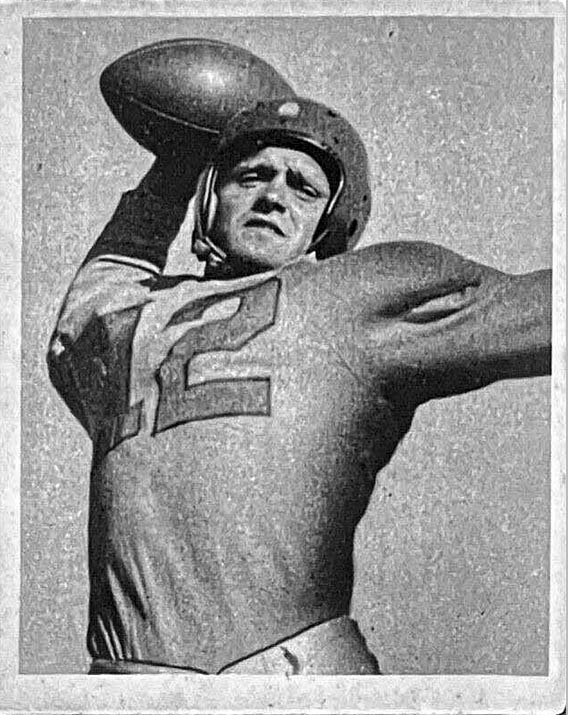
Former Buckeyes QB/HB, 1942 National Champion, and 1944 Heisman Trophy winner Les Horvath

When Brown went into the Navy, he directed his assistant Carroll Widdoes to head the team in his absence. The 1944 team fielded 31 freshmen but went undefeated and untied, including a victory over Paul Brown's Great Lakes Navy team. Ohio State finished second in the national rankings behind Army and Les Horvath became the first Buckeye to be awarded the Heisman Trophy. Also prominent on the 1942–44 teams was the first Buckeye African American star, Bill Willis. Brown chose not to return to Ohio State after the war, going into professional football instead.

Widdoes, despite having the highest two-year winning percentage of any Buckeye coach, asked to return to an assistant's position. Offensive coordinator Paul Bixler and Widdoes switched positions, and Bixler endured a mediocre 4–3–2 season. Bixler resigned and talk of Ohio State being a "graveyard of coaches" became commonplace, a reputation that lingered for decades.

Wes Fesler became head coach in 1947 but finished last in the Big Ten for the only time in team history. Ohio State improved greatly in 1948, winning 6 and losing 3, then in 1949 enjoyed a successful season due to the play of sophomore Vic Janowicz. Ohio State received the Rose Bowl invitation, where they came from behind to defeat California.

In 1950, Fesler, rumored to be resigning because of pressures associated with the position and abuse of his family by anonymous critics, returned to coach the Buckeyes, who won six games in a row to move into the top ranking in the AP poll. However, the season fell apart as the Buckeyes lost to Michigan during a blizzard, a game that came to be known as the "Snow Bowl". Two weeks later, citing concerns about his health and family, Fesler resigned.

=== Woody Hayes era (1951–1978) ===
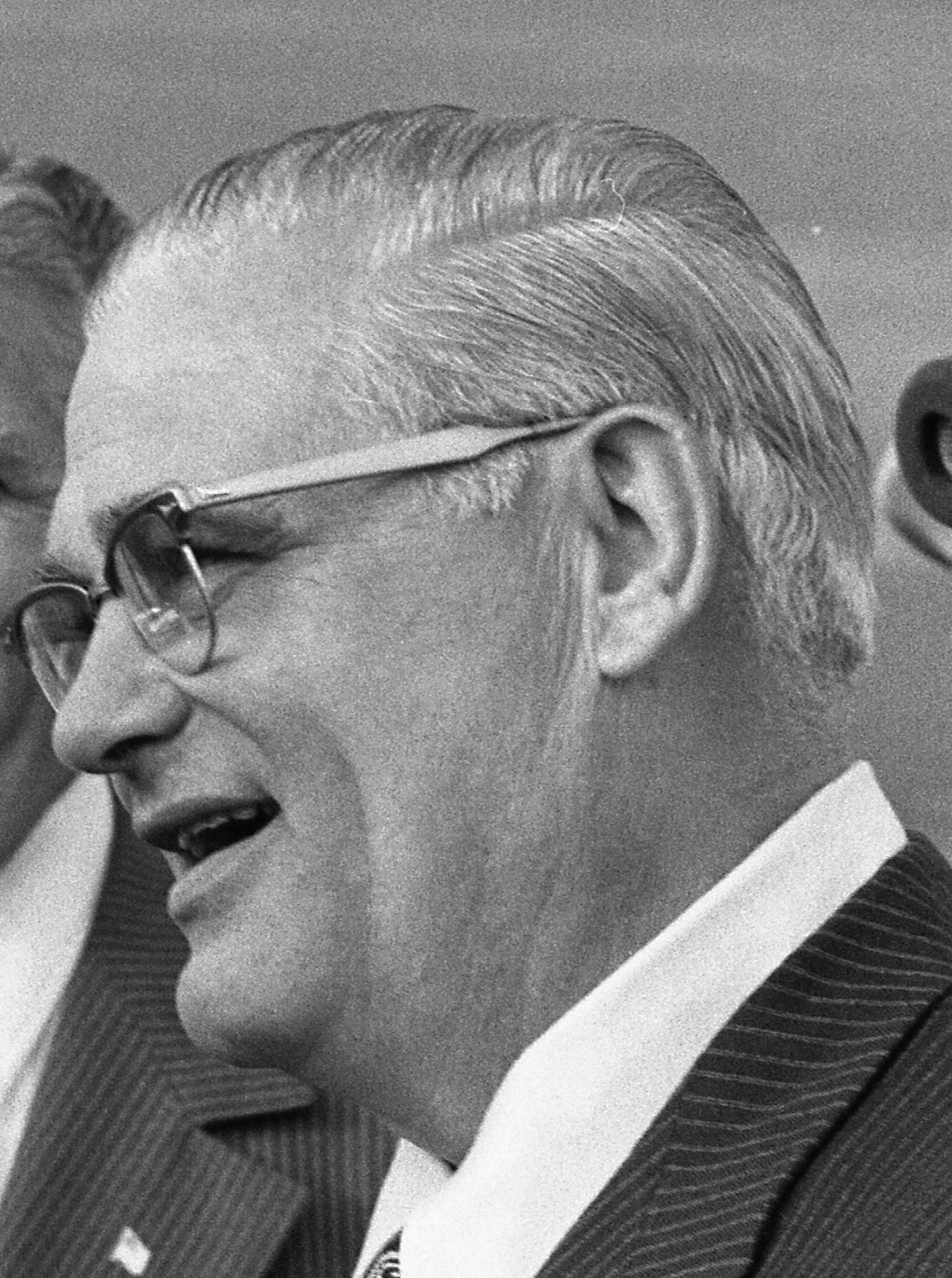
Woody Hayes, who won 205 games, five National Championships, and 13 Big Ten Championships - all team records - in 28 seasons (1951–1978) as head coach of the Buckeyes.

==== Early days ====
Wayne Woodrow "Woody" Hayes beat out Paul Brown, among others, to be named head coach on February 18, 1951. He instituted a demanding practice regimen and was both aggressive and vocal in enforcing it, alienating many players accustomed to Fesler's laid-back style. The 1951 Buckeyes won 4, lost 3, and tied 2, leaving many to question the ability of the new coach. In 1952, the team improved to 6–3 and recorded their first victory over Michigan in eight years, but after a 1953 loss to Michigan, critics called for the replacement of Hayes. In 1954, the Buckeyes were picked to finish no higher than 10th in the Big Ten. Hayes, however, had the talents of Howard "Hopalong" Cassady, and a historic goal-line stand against Michigan propelled Ohio State to a perfect season. Hayes led the powerhouse Buckeyes to a shared national championship (his first and the team's second). In 1955 the team again won the Big Ten, set an attendance record, and won in Ann Arbor for the first time in 18 years, while Hopalong Cassady was securing the Heisman Trophy. Ohio State passed only three times against Michigan (the sole reception was the only completion in the final three games of the year), leading to the characterization of Hayes' style of offensive play as "three yards and a cloud of dust". In a 1955 article in Sports Illustrated, Hayes admitted to making small personal loans to financially needy players. The article resulted in a furor over possible violations of NCAA rules, and the faculty council, followed by the Big Ten and NCAA, conducted lengthy investigations. Big Ten Commissioner Kenneth "Tug" Wilson found Hayes and the program guilty of violations and placed it on a year's probation in 1956.

==== Championship glory ====
In 1957, Ohio State won all of its remaining games after an opening loss to claim the Big Ten championship, then won the Rose Bowl over Oregon, and shared a national title with Auburn, for which Hayes was named Coach of the Year.

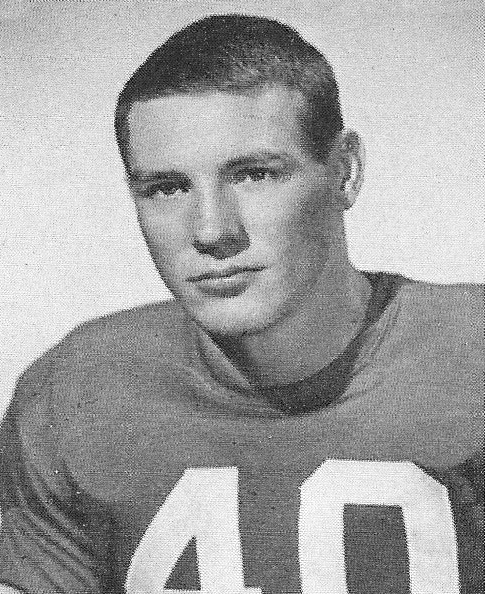
Former Buckeyes running back/receiver, 1954 National Champion, and 1955 Heisman Trophy winner Howard "Hopalong" Cassady

In 1961, the team went undefeated to be named national champions by the FWAA but a growing conflict between academics and athletics over Ohio State's reputation as a "football school" resulted in a faculty council vote to decline an invitation to the Rose Bowl, resulting in much public protest and debate. Over the next 6 seasons, Ohio State finished no higher than 2nd and had a losing season in 1966, and public speculation that Hayes would be replaced as a coach grew to its highest point since 1953. In 1968, Ohio State defeated the number one-ranked Purdue Boilermakers and continued to an undefeated season including a 50–14 rout of Michigan and a Rose Bowl victory over the USC Trojans that resulted in the national championship. The Class of 1970 became known as the "super sophomores" in 1968 and might have gone on to three consecutive national championships except for what may have been the most bitter loss in Buckeye history. The winning streak reached 22 games as Ohio State traveled to Michigan. The Buckeyes were 17-point favorites but directed by first-year coach Bo Schembechler, Michigan shocked the Buckeyes in a 24–12 upset. The 1969 loss to Michigan initiated what came to be known as "The Ten Year War", in which the rivalry, which pitted some of OSU's and UM's strongest teams ever, rose to the uppermost level of all sports and the competition between Schembechler and Hayes became legendary. Four times between 1970 and 1975, Ohio State and Michigan were both ranked in the top five of the AP Poll before their matchup. The Wolverines entered every game during those years undefeated and won only once, a 10–7 victory in Ann Arbor on November 20, 1971. Both teams used the annual game as motivation for entire seasons and after the initial win by Michigan, played dead even at four wins and a tie apiece. Hayes had the upper hand during the first part of the war, in which Ohio State won the conference championship and went to the Rose Bowl four straight years, while Michigan won the final three. It was also an era in which through television Ohio State football again came to the forefront of national attention.

Hayes set the tone in spring practice in 1970, placing a rug at the entrance to the Buckeye dressing room emblazoned with the words: "1969 MICH 24 OSU 12 — 1970 MICH:__ OSU:__" as a constant reminder of their objective. The "super sophomores", now seniors, used a strong fullback-oriented offense to smash their way through the season undefeated, struggling only with Purdue the week before the Michigan game. The return match in Columbus found both teams undefeated and untied, a "first" in the history of the rivalry, with Michigan, ranked fourth and Ohio State fifth. Ohio State combined a powerful defense that held Michigan to only 37 yards rushing, a rushing offense employing two tight ends as blockers, and a 26-yard touchdown pass from Kern to Bruce Jankowski to win 20–9. The Buckeyes returned to the Rose Bowl to be upset by Stanford 27–17. The "super sophomores" had garnered a record of 27–2, the best winning percentage of any three-year period in team history, and won or shared the Big Ten title all three years. The National Football Foundation named Ohio State as a national co-champion, along with Texas, for 1970 and awarded the teams joint possession of the MacArthur Bowl. 1971 was less successful than the preceding seasons, but the middle four years of the 10-year war saw the greatest success for Hayes against Michigan, although the teams fell short of repeating their 1968 national championship. Archie Griffin began his college football career in 1972, taking advantage of new NCAA eligibility rules that allowed freshmen to compete at the varsity level. In his second game, sent in against North Carolina late in the first quarter, Griffin set a new Buckeye rushing record with 239 yards and led the team in rushing for the season with 867.

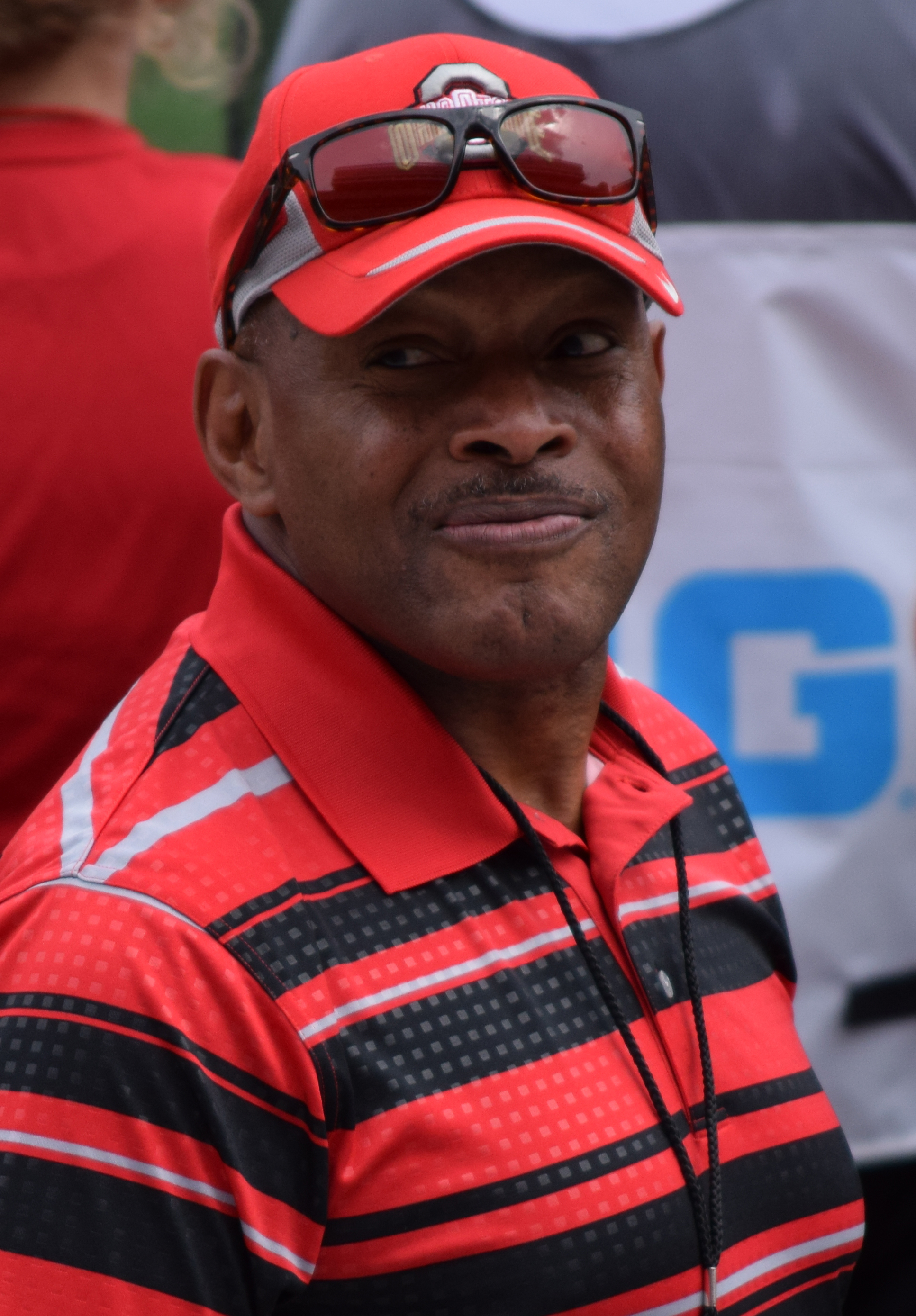
Former Buckeyes RB Archie Griffin, the only two-time Heisman Trophy winner in college football history (1974–75)

The following season, Hayes installed an I-formation attack with Griffin at tailback and fellow sophomore Cornelius Greene at quarterback. The Buckeyes went undefeated with a powerful offense and impenetrable defense, achieving an average margin of victory of 31 points a game. The only blemish on their record was a 10–10 tie with Michigan after both teams had entered the game unbeaten. (The tie was more galling for the Wolverines, however, as the Big Ten selected Ohio State to represent the conference in the Rose Bowl.) Despite soundly defeating defending national champion USC, however, the tie with Michigan resulted in the Buckeyes finishing second to Notre Dame in the final AP rankings. Griffin, Randy Gradishar, Van DeCree, and John Hicks were named All-Americans; Hicks, an offensive tackle, not only won both the Outland and Lombardi Trophies but placed second in the Heisman Trophy competition. 1974 and 1975 were seasons of both elation and frustration. The Buckeyes twice more defeated Michigan, and went to two Rose Bowls, but lost both. The 1974 team seemed bound for another national championship when it was derailed by a loss to unranked Michigan State (Ohio State lost only twice in the regular season during Griffin's four-year career, both to the Spartans), and the next year, the No. 1-ranked Bucks lost 23–10 to 11th-ranked UCLA in the 1976 Rose Bowl. In all, the Buckeyes were 40–5–1 from 1972 to 1975, winning the Big Ten all four years and never losing to Michigan, but it was the losses and ties that proved important to Ohio State missing out on achieving a national championship. At any rate, Archie Griffin rushed for 5,589 yards combined in his four seasons at Ohio State while winning the Heisman Trophy in 1974 (1,695 yards rushed) and 1975 (1,450 yards).

==== Downfall ====
The falloff in the success of Hayes' last three years was not great. His teams forged records of 9–2–1, 9–3, and 7–4–1, and made bowl appearances in all three years (the rules had changed to allow appearances in other than the Rose Bowl). However, frustrations in losing three straight years to Michigan, and other factors, resulted in growing criticism of Hayes and his methods, particularly his on-the-field fits of temper. Even so, his downfall was sudden and shocking when, near the end of the nationally televised Gator Bowl, Hayes punched Clemson middle guard Charlie Bauman after Bauman intercepted a pass to kill Ohio State's last chance to win. Hayes was fired after the game by Ohio State president Harold Enarson and athletic director Hugh Hindman.

=== Earle Bruce era (1979–1987) ===
Hayes was replaced by a former protégé, Iowa State head coach Earle Bruce. Bruce inherited a strong team led by sophomore quarterback Art Schlichter but that had also lost 11 starters, and the 1979 squad exceeded pre-season expectations, ending the 3-year loss drought against Michigan and going to the Rose Bowl with an opportunity once again to be national champions. The Buckeyes lost both by a single point, 17–16, but Bruce was named Coach of the Year. His success was hailed by those in the media who saw it as a rebuke of Hayes and the start of a "new era". 1980, however, saw the start of a trend that eventually brought criticism to Bruce, when Ohio State finished with a 9–3 record, the first of six consecutive years at 9–3. Though each of these seasons, and the 10–3 season that followed them, culminated in a bowl game, Ohio State did not appear to be any closer to a national championship than during the end of the Hayes era. Bruce's teams were not without impact players, however. All-Americans and future National Football League stars included Keith Byars, Cris Carter, Chris Spielman, John Frank, Jim Lachey, Tom Tupa, Marcus Marek, and Pepper Johnson. His program was also known for the number of notable assistant coaches on staff, including Jim Tressel, Glen Mason, Pete Carroll, Nick Saban, Urban Meyer and Dom Capers. For the first time since 1922, the Buckeyes lost three in a row in Ohio Stadium in 1982, including rematches with Stanford and Florida State, and for the second year in a row to Wisconsin, but then won seven straight, the last over BYU in the Holiday Bowl. Sophomore running back Keith Byars had a stand-out season in 1983, rushing for 1,199 yards, and Ohio State defeated the Oklahoma Sooners in Norman, but three losses in conference meant a 4th-place finish. 1984 witnessed what Bruce called "the greatest comeback after the worst start" when Ohio State fell behind Illinois 24–0 at home but roared back on 274 yards rushing and five touchdowns by Byars to win 45–38. Ohio State also defeated Michigan to win an outright Big Ten championship. Byars led the nation in rushing and scoring but finished second in Heisman balloting.

==== Downfall ====
In 1986, Bruce received a 3-year contract, the first for the modern program but the team opened with two losses, which had not occurred in over 90 years. The Buckeyes then won 9 in a row before Michigan took a close game when kicker Matt Frantz missed a field goal with a minute to play. After the season Bruce was offered the position of head coach at the University of Arizona with a 5-year contract but was persuaded to stay at his alma mater by Athletic Director Rick Bay. Hopes for a standout season in 1987 suffered a serious setback when All-American wide receiver Cris Carter was dropped from the team for signing with an agent. Indiana defeated Ohio State for the first time since 1951, 31–10, in a game that came to be known as the "darkest day", and Ohio State lost three conference games in a row going into the Michigan game. On the Monday of Michigan week, after a weekend of rumors and speculation, Ohio State President Edward Jennings fired Bruce but tried to keep the dismissal secret until after the end of the season. Bay, who had been instrumental in keeping Bruce at Ohio State, disregarded Jennings' orders and announced the firing and his own resignation in protest. Jennings made his own situation worse by refusing to give a reason for the firing and the circumstances have been the subject of controversy since. The Buckeyes enjoyed an emotional come-from-behind victory over Michigan in Ann Arbor after the entire team wore headbands bearing the word "EARLE", then declined an invitation to play in the Sun Bowl.

=== John Cooper era (1988–2000) ===
==== Early days ====
John Cooper was hired as the 21st football head coach at Ohio State before the end of 1987 and before he had coached his last game at Arizona State University. Cooper's coaching record at ASU and at Tulsa prior to that stood out among his credentials, as did a victory over Michigan in the 1987 Rose Bowl.

Cooper's 13 years as the Buckeye head coach are largely remembered in the litany of negative statistics associated with him: a notorious 2–10–1 record against Michigan, a 3–8 record in bowl games, a 5-year losing streak to Illinois to start his term and a 6–7 record overall, and blowing a 15-point 3rd quarter lead in a 28–24 loss to unranked Michigan State when the Buckeyes were the top-ranked team in the nation and en route to a national championship. However, his record also has many positives: back-to-back victories over Notre Dame, two finishes second-ranked in the polls, and three Big Ten championships (albeit shared). Cooper also recruited 15 players who were first-round draft picks in the National Football League.

Both 1988 and 1989 began identically: a season-opening win followed by an embarrassing loss to a highly regarded team (Pitt and USC); a rebound win against two other highly regarded programs (LSU and Boston College) followed by a loss to Illinois in the conference opener. However, 1988 saw Ohio State lose its first three conference games and a close game at home against Michigan for a 4–6–1 record, its first losing season in 22 years. In 1989 the Buckeyes won 6 consecutive Big Ten games before losing its last two to go 8–4. The most noteworthy victory occurred in Minneapolis when Ohio State overcame a 31–0 deficit to Minnesota to win 41–37. 1990 continued the pattern with a 2-win 2-loss start and an overall 7–4–1 record that included an embarrassing loss to Air Force in the Liberty Bowl. 1991 was 8–4, notable primarily as the season that sophomore running back Robert Smith quit the team. 1992, with senior Kirk Herbstreit at quarterback, and Smith back on the team was 8–3–1, but the losing streak to Michigan was broken with a 13–13 tie. Persistent rumors that Cooper would resign or be fired were laid to rest when University President Gordon Gee announced he would be back in 1993.

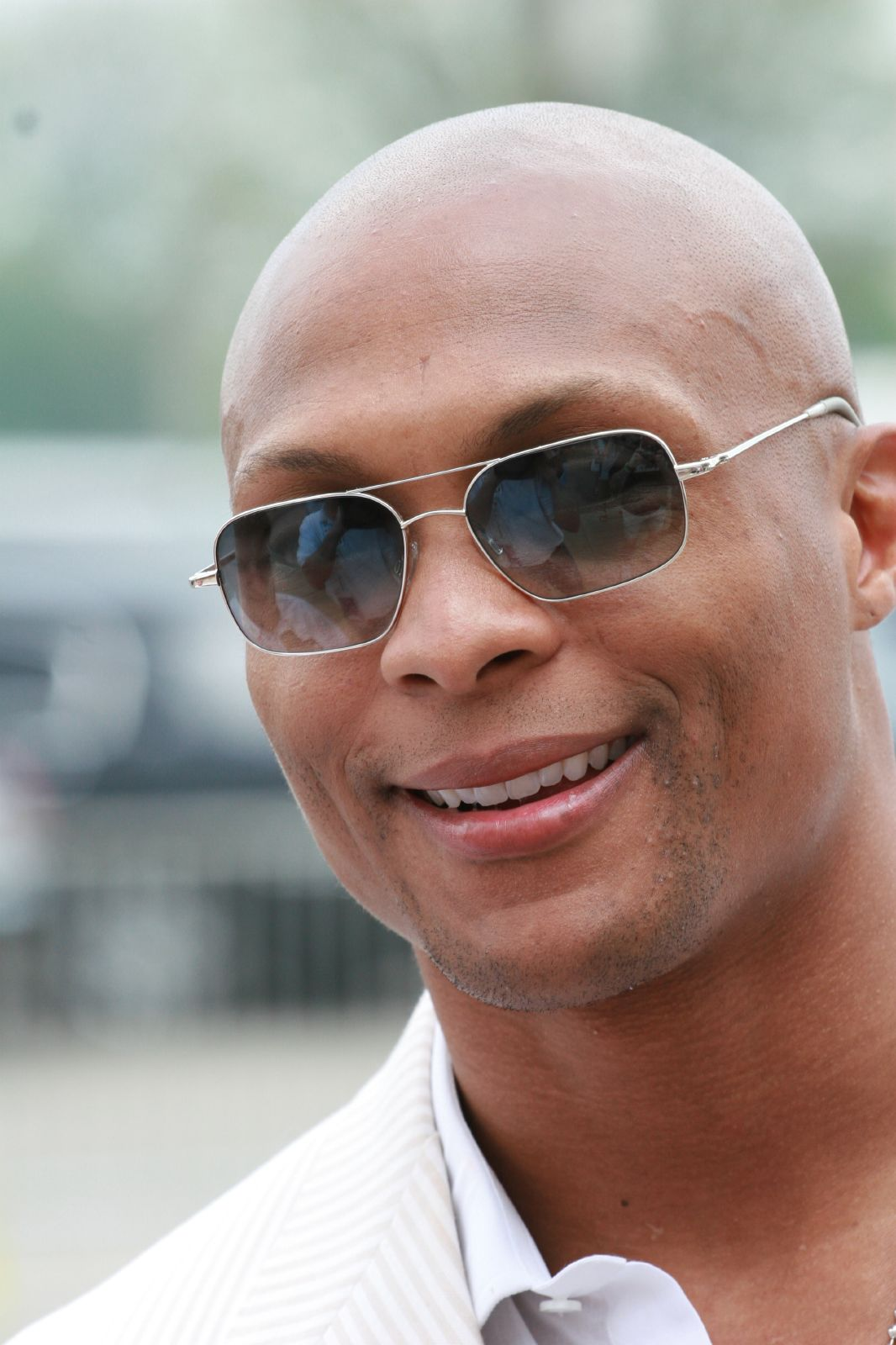
Former Buckeyes RB Eddie George, who won the 1995 Heisman Trophy.

==== Failures against Michigan ====
The next six seasons were very successful, winning 10 or more games in five out of six, and sharing the conference championship in three. Eddie George won the Heisman Trophy in 1995 after a tremendous senior season, Ohio State defeated Notre Dame in 1995 and 1996, and won half its bowl games. But in three seasons (1993, 1995, and 1996) the Buckeyes entered the Michigan game undefeated, with the possibility of a national championship in at least one, and lost all three to underdog Wolverine teams. Ohio State had won 62 games and lost only 12, but a third of those were to Michigan. After renewing his contract and becoming a member of the "million dollar coaching club", Cooper started sophomore Austin Moherman against the Miami Hurricanes in the nationally televised Kickoff Classic and was soundly beaten. That presaged a mediocre season in which the Buckeyes finished 6–6, ending their successful 90's run. The 2000 team was more successful, going 8–4, but criticism of Cooper among fans had risen to a clamor again and touched on many areas of the program beyond specific game records. The negative publicity rose to a peak in the days leading up to Ohio State's matchup with South Carolina in the Outback Bowl, when wide receiver Reggie Germany was suspended for having a 0.0 GPA, team captain Matt Wilhelm publicly criticized fellow player Ken-Yon Rambo, and one Buckeye lineman sued another.

==== Downfall ====
On January 3, 2001, Cooper was fired. His loss in the Outback Bowl to a team that had not even won a single game the year before was a factor in his subsequent firing, as was negative publicity regarding player behavior before and during the game. Other contributing factors included the record against Michigan (which was actually considered by most people to be the biggest reason for his firing), a reputation of inability to win "big games", the lack of a national championship, the perception of him as an outsider by many alumni, the poor bowl game record, and finally a perceived lack of discipline on the team.

=== Jim Tressel era (2001–2010) ===
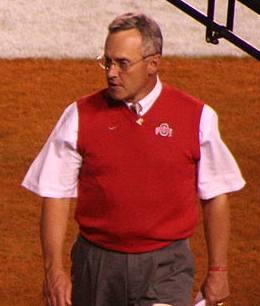
Former head coach Jim Tressel, who led the Buckeyes to the 2002 National Championship, and six Big Ten titles.

==== Early days ====
Ohio State quickly sought a replacement for Cooper and after a nationwide search hired Jim Tressel. With four NCAA Division I-AA National Championships at Youngstown State University, Tressel, formerly an assistant coach for Earle Bruce, was an Ohioan who was considered to be appreciative of Buckeye football traditions. Although there were some doubts as to whether or not Tressel could repeat his earlier success at the Division 1A level, most fans and alumni met the coaching change with enthusiasm. On the day of his hiring, Jim Tressel, speaking to fans and students at a Buckeye basketball game, made a prophetic implication that he would lead the Buckeyes to beat Michigan in Ann Arbor the following November. Tressel's first season was difficult as the Buckeyes finished 7–5 (all but one loss was by a touchdown or less), but he made good on his promise, beating Michigan in Ann Arbor.

==== National Championship ====
While its fans were optimistic about the chance for success of the 2002 team, most observers were surprised by Ohio State's National Championship. Ohio State used strong defense, ball-control play-calling, and field position tactics to win numerous close games, a style of play characterized as "Tresselball", and disparaged by detractors as "the Luckeyes".

==== Later years ====
The 2006 and 2007 regular seasons ended with just one combined loss and consecutive appearances in the national championship game. The Buckeyes lost both by wide margins. On January 1, 2010, the Buckeyes defeated the Oregon Ducks in the Rose Bowl Game, by a score of 26–17. This ended a 3-game BCS losing streak for Ohio State, having lost 2 national championships and one Tostitos Fiesta Bowl. Terrelle Pryor was named MVP of the contest with 2 touchdown passes for a career-high 266 passing yards. In addition, he had more total yards than the entire Oregon Ducks team.

==== "Tattoogate" ====
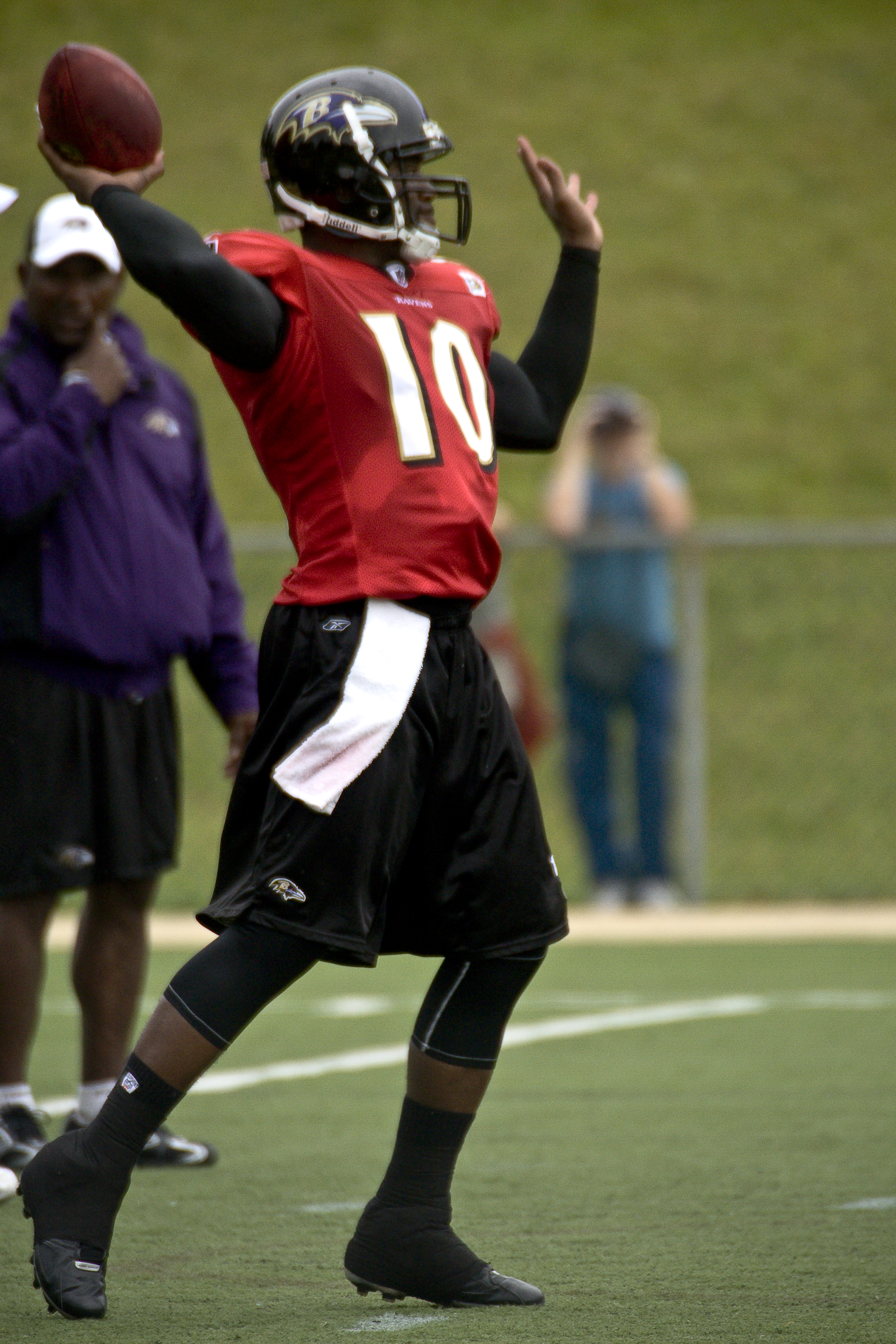
Former Buckeyes QB Troy Smith (shown as a member of the NFL's Baltimore Ravens), the 2006 Heisman Trophy winner

In December 2010, it was announced that five student-athletes on the football team would be suspended for the first five games of the 2011 season for NCAA violations. The punishments stemmed from an incident when some of the Buckeye players received tattoos for their autographs, according to news reports. Other violations committed by the players included the selling of several items given to them by the university, such as Big Ten championship rings.

On December 22, 2010, the NCAA announced that five players would be suspended for the first five games of the 2011 season due to receiving improper benefits. Mike Adams, Dan Herron, DeVier Posey, Solomon Thomas, and quarterback Terrelle Pryor were found to have signed autographs in return for tattoos, as well as selling memorabilia given to them by the university. In addition, Jordan Whiting was suspended for the season opener for his involvement. The scandal originated at Fine Line Tattoos and Piercings in Columbus, whose owner, Edward Rife, was being investigated for felony drug trafficking. On January 4, 2011, with all the players allowed to participate by the NCAA, the Buckeyes defeated the Arkansas Razorbacks in the Sugar Bowl by a margin of 31–26. The win, along with every other one from the 2010 season, would later be vacated due to the scandal. The Buckeyes finished the season 12–1, with their only official game being a loss to Wisconsin.

==== Downfall ====
On March 8, 2011, OSU suspended head coach Jim Tressel for the first 2 games of the 2011 season and fined him $250,000 for not informing the university and the NCAA that he had knowledge of his players receiving improper benefits. Coach Tressel's suspension would later be increased to 5 games by the university. On May 30, 2011, Jim Tressel resigned as head coach of the Buckeyes. On June 6, 2011, a story in Sports Illustrated reported that at least 28 players, including Rob Rose, T. J. Downing, Louis Irizarry, Chris Vance, C. J. Barnett, Dorien Bell, Jamaal Berry, Bo DeLande, Zach Domicone, Storm Klein, Etienne Sabino, John Simon, Nathan Williams, Jermale Hines, Devon Torrence, Donald Washington, Thaddeus Gibson, Jermil Martin, Lamaar Thomas, and Doug Worthington traded team memorabilia or used equipment for tattoos or other merchandise or services between 2002 and 2010. The report alleged that Tressel had violated NCAA bylaw 10.1, unethical conduct, three times by not acting when told of the tattoo improprieties, by signing a statement saying he knew of no violations, and for withholding information on what was going on from university officials.

=== Luke Fickell (2011) ===
On July 8, 2011, Ohio State University decided to vacate all victories from the 2010 football season as self-imposed punishment for major NCAA violations. Former coach Jim Tressel received more than $52,000 from the university and didn't have to pay a $250,000 fine for his involvement in the scandal. His status was also changed from "Resigned" to "Retired" in keeping with his wishes to "remain a Buckeye for life". Ohio State named Luke Fickell interim head coach for the 2011 season following Tressel's resignation, and Fickell coached the 2011 Buckeyes to a 6–7 record; going 6–6 in the regular season and losing in the Gator Bowl to Florida.

=== Urban Meyer era (2012–2018) ===
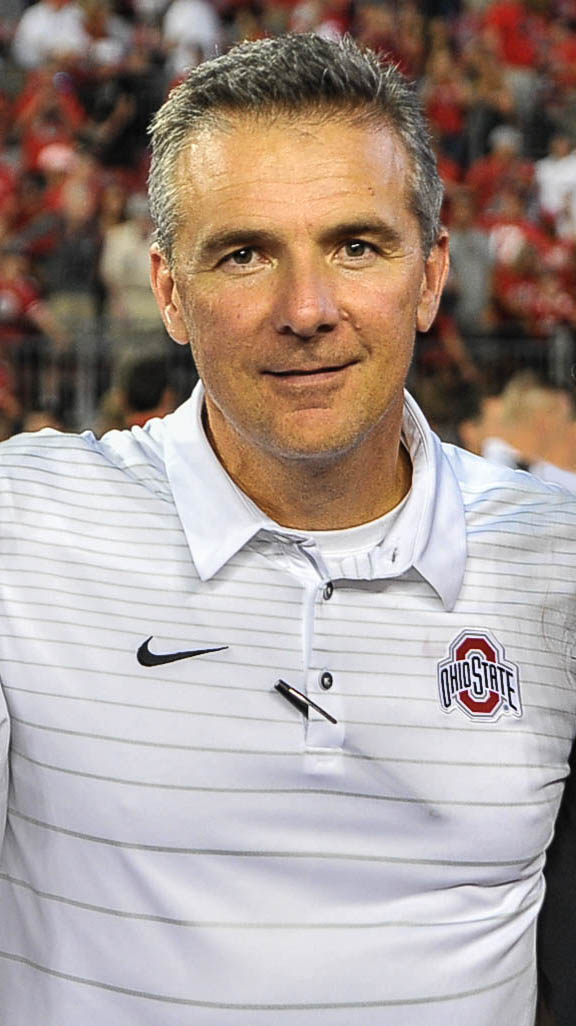
Former head coach Urban Meyer, who led the Buckeyes to seven division titles, three Big Ten Championships, the 2014 national championship, and the team's all-time record winning streak (24).

==== Early years ====
On November 28, 2011, former University of Florida head coach and ESPN college football analyst Urban Meyer accepted the position of Buckeyes head coach. Meyer assumed head coaching responsibilities following the Buckeyes' January 2012 Gator Bowl appearance. Meyer's first season at Ohio State did not include a postseason contest, as the Buckeyes were sanctioned with a one-year bowl ban on December 20, 2011. The NCAA sanctions also included the loss of three scholarships each year for the following three years and three years' probation to end on December 19, 2014. Ohio State was required to vacate all wins from the 2010 season, the 2010 Big Ten Conference championship and their win in the 2011 Sugar Bowl. The school's share of the Sugar Bowl proceeds was forfeited as well. In Meyer's first year, the Buckeyes went a perfect 12–0, winning the 2012 Big Ten Leaders Division, though the previously mentioned sanctions kept them from playing in the 2012 Big Ten Football Championship Game and a postseason bowl game. On November 23, 2013, the Buckeyes clinched their second straight Leaders Division Championship, after defeating Indiana 42–14. With the victory over Indiana, Ohio State set a team record for all-time consecutive wins, with 23. The following week, Ohio State defeated Michigan 42–41 in Ann Arbor, to increase the streak to 24. The streak ended with Ohio State's 34–24 loss to Michigan State in the 2013 Big Ten Conference Championship game on December 7, marking Meyer's first loss as the Buckeyes' head coach. On January 3, 2014, the Buckeyes were defeated by Clemson in the Orange Bowl 40–35.

==== National Championship ====
The logo for the 2014 National Champion Buckeyes, which celebrated the football program's 125th anniversary

On November 22, 2014, the Buckeyes clinched the first-ever Big Ten East Division Championship when they defeated Indiana 42–27, earning a berth in the 2014 Big Ten Championship Game, where they defeated West Division champion Wisconsin 59–0 to win the Big Ten Conference Championship and qualified for the four-team playoff to decide the National Champion. OSU defeated Alabama in the Sugar Bowl 42–35, on January 1, 2015, to qualify for the National Championship Game against Rose Bowl winner Oregon on January 12 (the Rose and Sugar Bowls were the designated semifinal games in 2014). OSU claimed the first-ever College Football Playoff National Championship by defeating Oregon 42–20.

==== Later years ====
The 2015 season for the Buckeyes began with a 10–0 start before losing on a last-second field goal to Michigan State on November 21, ending the Buckeyes' quest to repeat as National Champions. However, the Buckeyes recovered in their next two games, with dominating wins over Michigan and then over Notre Dame in the Fiesta Bowl, to finish the season at 12–1. The 2016 season started off great with 6 straight victories, including a win over the Oklahoma Sooners, but the streak came to an end as the team lost a heart-breaker to the Penn State Nittany Lions. The Buckeyes went on to win the rest of their regular-season games, finishing 11–1. They did not play in the Big Ten Championship as Penn State took the division. In a controversial call, the College Football Playoff committee gave Ohio State a spot in the Playoff. Ohio State lost in the Fiesta Bowl to the Clemson Tigers in an embarrassing 31–0 loss, ending the season 11–2. The 2017 season started out on a high note with a victory over the Indiana Hoosiers, but the next week the Buckeyes fell to the Oklahoma Sooners. The Buckeyes won the next 6 games, including a win over No. 2 Penn State in a revenge game of sorts. The Buckeyes suffered an embarrassing defeat against the Iowa Hawkeyes. The Buckeyes ended the season 12–2 overall, winning the rest of their games including a Big Ten Championship victory over No. 4 Wisconsin and a Cotton Bowl victory over USC.

==== Downfall ====
Urban Meyer was suspended for the first three games of the 2018 season for mishandling domestic violence allegations against then-wide receivers coach Zach Smith. Co-Offensive coordinator and quarterbacks coach Ryan Day served as interim coach and led the Buckeyes to a 3–0 start. Meyer returned to the sidelines and coached the team to four more victories before the team suffered a loss on October 20 to Purdue, 49–20. The Buckeyes won their last four games of the regular season, including a 62–39 win over archrival Michigan, in Columbus. The win gave the Buckeyes a share of the Big Ten East Division title, and the right to face Northwestern in the Big Ten Championship Game, which Ohio State won for its second consecutive Big Ten Championship. Ohio State would go on to win the Rose Bowl over Pac-12 Champion Washington 28–23, giving Ohio State their 8th Rose Bowl win.

=== Ryan Day era (2019–present) ===
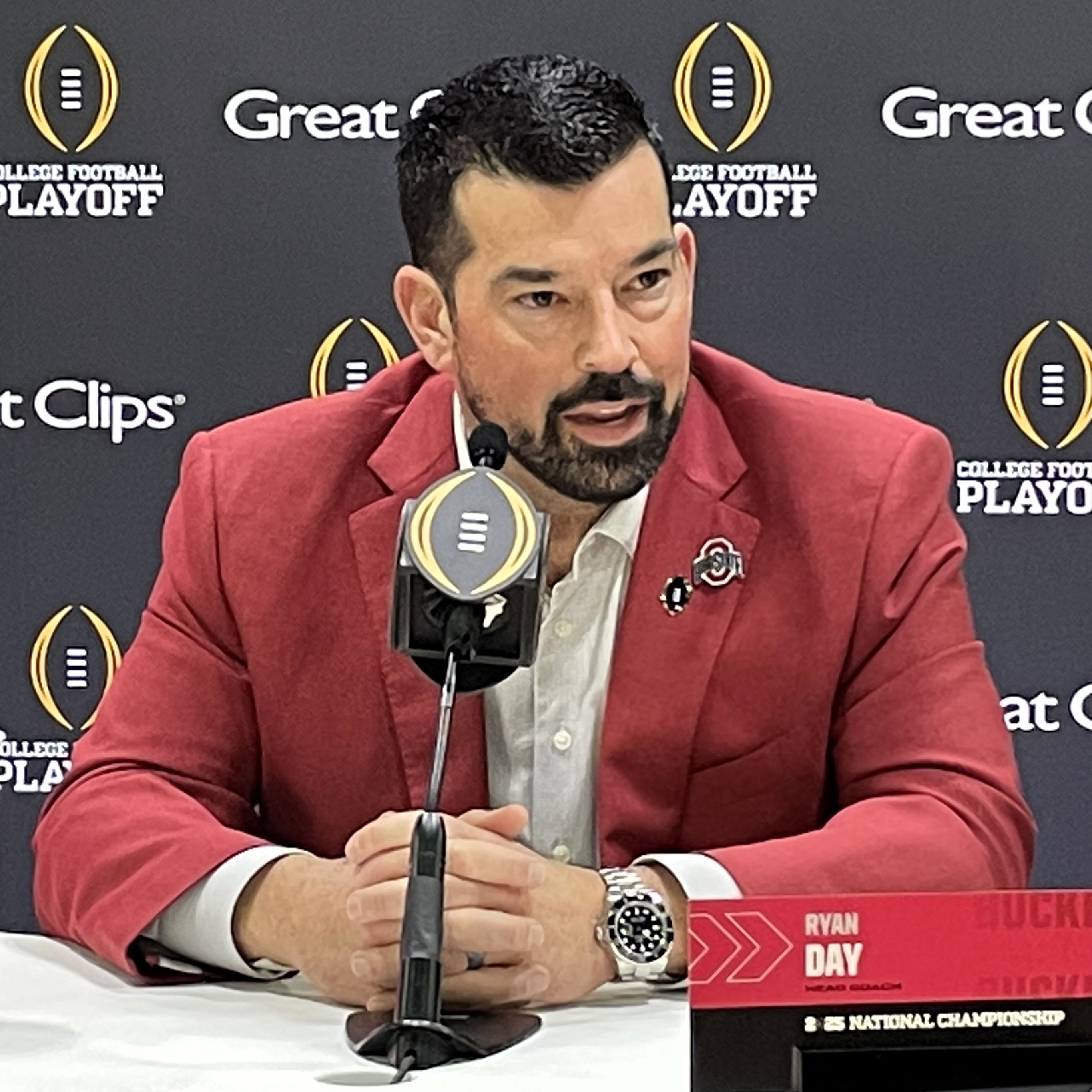
Current head coach Ryan Day, who has led the Buckeyes to two Big Ten Championships and the 2024 National Championship.

On December 4, 2018, the university announced that Meyer would retire after the 2019 Rose Bowl and be replaced by co-offensive coordinator Ryan Day.

In Day's first year, the Buckeyes went a perfect 13–0, including a win over archrival Michigan by a score of 56–27 and defeating Wisconsin for the Big Ten Championship. They would earn a spot in the College Football Playoff but would lose to Clemson 29–23 in the 2019 Fiesta Bowl. In Day's second year, the Big Ten season didn't start until late October due to the COVID-19 pandemic, and the Buckeyes would only play five out of a scheduled eight games due to several virus-related cancellations - including the Michigan game. Nevertheless, the Buckeyes would go 5–0 in the regular season, win the East Division title, and go on to beat Northwestern 22–10 in the Big Ten Championship Game, giving Day his second straight conference title. On January 1, 2021, the Buckeyes defeated Clemson 49–28 to win the Sugar Bowl in a rematch of the 2019 Fiesta Bowl to advance to the CFP National Championship Game against Alabama on January 11, which they lost 52–24. On September 11, 2021, he suffered his first regular season loss as head coach when the Oregon Ducks defeated the Buckeyes 35–28 in the 2nd game of the season. Ohio State's streak of defeating Michigan also came to an end on November 27, 2021, in Ann Arbor, when Ohio State lost 42–27. They then won the 2022 Rose Bowl against Utah 48–45 on January 1, 2022.

In 2022, Day led the team to an 11–0 record and was ranked #2 going into the Michigan game, which #3 Michigan would win 45–23 on November 26, 2022 (outscoring the Buckeyes 28–3 in the second half), in Ohio State's first loss to Michigan in Columbus since 2000, and first back–to–back losses to Michigan since 1999–2000. The Buckeyes would go on to play the defending national champion Georgia Bulldogs in the 2022 national semifinal game on New Year's Eve, taking a 14-point lead into the fourth quarter, but ultimately seeing their season come to an end with a 42–41 loss. Kicker Noah Ruggles' would-be game-winning field goal attempt sailed wide left just as the clock struck midnight on New Year's Day, 2023.

In 2023, Day led the team to an 11–0 record and was ranked #2 going into the Michigan game for the second consecutive year. This time, Michigan won by six points 30–24 on November 25, 2023. This marked the first three-game losing streak to Michigan since 1995–97. The Buckeyes were then invited to the 2023 Cotton Bowl, where they lost to the Missouri Tigers 14–3 on December 29, 2023.

In 2024, Day led the team to an 10–1 record leading into the Michigan game, but would lose to the Wolverines for the fourth straight year by a 13–10 score on November 30. However, with the newly expanded 12-team College Football Playoff (CFP) format, the Buckeyes would reach the College Football Playoff (CFP) as the number 8-seed. They would beat 9th ranked Tennessee 42–17 in the opening round on December 21 at Ohio Stadium, Oregon 41–21 in the Rose Bowl (a CFP quarterfinal) on January 1, 2025, Texas 28–14 in the Cotton Bowl (a CFP semifinal) on January 10, 2025, and then Notre Dame 34–23 in the 2024 CFP National Championship Game on January 20, 2025, to win the title, which is the ninth recognized championship in school history.

Day's 2025 campaign was modest in comparison. Ohio State went 9-0 in the Big Ten and notched a 12-2 overall standing. The Buckeyes opened the season with a 14-7 win over #1 Texas and never looked back, going undefeated until December 6, 2025 when they lost 13-10 to #2 Indiana in the Big Ten Championship game. Day's leadership helped Ohio State defeat multiple top tier D1 teams, including a 24-6 win over Washington on September 27, 2025, a 34-16 triumph over #17 Illinois two weeks later on October 11, 2026, and a decisive 38-14 victory over Penn State on November 1, 2025. The Buckeyes also blanked two opponents during the 2025 regular season, starting with a 70-0 win over Grambling State on September 6, 2025, and a 34-0 win against Wisconsin on October 18, 2025. Both games highlighted the strength of Day's offensive and defensive units.

Then on Saturday, November 29, 2025, Day led Ohio State to a 27-9 win against Michigan. It was the first time in 5 years that Ohio State won this marquee matchup. After the game, Day remarked, "We're going to win with humility. I'm just happy for a lot of people right now."

The Buckeyes' 2025 season concluded with a 24-14 loss to #10 Miami at the College Football Playoff Quarterfinal Cotton Bowl Classic.

== Championships ==
=== National ===
Ohio State recognizes nine national championships from NCAA-designated "consensus" selectors, including seven (1942, 1954, 1957, 1968, 2002, 2014, 2024) from the major wire-service: AP Poll or Coaches' Poll.

The following is a list of Ohio State's claimed national championships:

Year	Head coach	Selector(s)	Overall Record	Big Ten Record	Bowl Game(s)	AP Poll	Coaches Poll
1942	Paul Brown	AP	9–1	6–1	–	No. 1	−
1954	Woody Hayes	AP	10–0	7–0	Won Rose Bowl	No. 1	No. 2
1957	Woody Hayes	Coaches, FWAA	9–1	7–0	Won Rose Bowl	No. 2	No. 1
1961	Woody Hayes	FWAA	8–0–1	6–0	–	No. 2	No. 2
1968	Woody Hayes	AP, Coaches, FWAA, NFF	10–0	7–0	Won Rose Bowl	No. 1	No. 1
1970	Woody Hayes	NFF (co-champion)	9–1	7–0	Lost Rose Bowl	No. 5	No. 2
2002	Jim Tressel	BCS, AP, Coaches, FWAA, NFF	14–0	8–0	Won Fiesta Bowl (BCS National Championship Game)	No. 1	No. 1
2014	Urban Meyer	CFP, AP, Coaches, NFF	14–1	8–0	Won Sugar Bowl (CFP semifinal); Won CFP National Championship	No. 1	No. 1
2024	Ryan Day	CFP, AP, Coaches, NFF	14–2	7–2	Won Rose Bowl (CFP quarterfinal); Won Cotton Bowl (CFP semifinal); Won CFP National Championship	No. 1	No. 1

Ohio State has also been selected an additional seven times by various NCAA-designated "major selectors", in 1933, 1944, 1969, 1973, 1974, 1975, and 2006. However, the Buckeyes do not recognize any of those championships.

=== Conference ===
Ohio State joined the Big Ten in 1912; before that they were a member of the Ohio Athletic Conference (OAC) and won two OAC titles. Ohio State has won a championship in the Big Ten 39 times, second-most in the conference.

Year	Conference	Coach	Record	Conference Record
1906	OAC	Albert E. Herrnstein	8–1	4–0
1912	OAC	John Richards	6–3	4–0
1916	Big Ten	John Wilce	7–0	4–0
1917	Big Ten	John Wilce	8–0–1	4–0
1920	Big Ten	John Wilce	7–1	5–0
1935†	Big Ten	Francis Schmidt	7–1	5–0
1939	Big Ten	Francis Schmidt	6–2	5–1
1942	Big Ten	Paul Brown	9–1	5–1
1944	Big Ten	Carroll Widdoes	9–0	6–0
1949†	Big Ten	Wes Fesler	7–1–2	4–1–1
1954	Big Ten	Woody Hayes	10–0	7–0
1955	Big Ten	Woody Hayes	7–2	6–0
1957	Big Ten	Woody Hayes	9–1	7–0
1961	Big Ten	Woody Hayes	8–0–1	6–0
1968	Big Ten	Woody Hayes	10–0	7–0
1969†	Big Ten	Woody Hayes	8–1	6–1
1970	Big Ten	Woody Hayes	9–1	7–0
1972†	Big Ten	Woody Hayes	9–2	7–1
1973†	Big Ten	Woody Hayes	10–0–1	7–0–1
1974†	Big Ten	Woody Hayes	10–2	7–1
1975	Big Ten	Woody Hayes	11–1	8–0
1976†	Big Ten	Woody Hayes	9–2–1	7–1
1977†	Big Ten	Woody Hayes	9–3	6–2
1979	Big Ten	Earle Bruce	11–1	8–0
1981†	Big Ten	Earle Bruce	9–3	6–2
1984	Big Ten	Earle Bruce	9–3	7–2
1986†	Big Ten	Earle Bruce	10–3	7–1
1993†	Big Ten	John Cooper	10–1–1	6–1–1
1996†	Big Ten	John Cooper	11–1	7–1
1998†	Big Ten	John Cooper	11–1	7–1
2002†	Big Ten	Jim Tressel	14–0	8–0
2005†	Big Ten	Jim Tressel	10–2	7–1
2006	Big Ten	Jim Tressel	12–1	8–0
2007	Big Ten	Jim Tressel	11–2	7–1
2008†	Big Ten	Jim Tressel	10–3	7–1
2009	Big Ten	Jim Tressel	11–2	7–1
2014	Big Ten	Urban Meyer	14–1	8–0
2017	Big Ten	Urban Meyer	12–2	8–1
2018	Big Ten	Urban Meyer	13–1	8–1
2019	Big Ten	Ryan Day	13–1	9–0
2020	Big Ten	Ryan Day	7–1	6–0

† Co-champions

=== Division ===
From 2011 to 2023, Big Ten had divisions to decide who would play for the conference championship. The divisions were known as Legends and Leaders from 2011 to 2013. In 2014, the divisions were realigned geographically into East and West. The divisional format ended for the 2024 season.

Year	Division	Coach	Opponent	CG Result
2012	Big Ten Leaders	Urban Meyer	N/A – Ineligible (postseason ban)	
2013	Big Ten Leaders	Urban Meyer	Michigan State	L 24–34
2014	Big Ten East	Urban Meyer	Wisconsin	W 59–0
2015†	Big Ten East	Urban Meyer	N/A lost tiebreaker to Michigan State	
2016†	Big Ten East	Urban Meyer	N/A lost tiebreaker to Penn State	
2017	Big Ten East	Urban Meyer	Wisconsin	W 27–21
2018†	Big Ten East	Urban Meyer	Northwestern	W 45–24
2019	Big Ten East	Ryan Day	Wisconsin	W 34–21
2020	Big Ten East	Ryan Day	Northwestern	W 22–10
2021†	Big Ten East	Ryan Day	N/A lost tiebreaker to Michigan	

† Co-champions

== Undefeated seasons ==
Year	Overall Record	Big Ten Record	Head coach
1899	9–0–1	–	John B. Eckstorm
1916	7–0	4–0	John Wilce
1917	8–0–1	4–0	John Wilce
1944	9–0	6–0	Carroll Widdoes
1954	10–0	7–0	Woody Hayes
1961	8–0–1	6–0	Woody Hayes
1968	10–0	7–0	Woody Hayes
1973	10–0–1	7–0–1	Woody Hayes
2002	14–0	8–0	Jim Tressel
2012	12–0	8–0	Urban Meyer

== Bowl games ==
Ohio State has played in 60 bowl games in which they are 29–30–0, and one vacated win. The Buckeyes have been to the Rose Bowl 17 times. As of December 2024, Ohio State has indicated that it will not count CFP First Round games as bowl appearances. Below are the bowl appearances under current head coach Ryan Day.

Season	Coach	Bowl	Opponent	Result
2019	Ryan Day	CFP Semifinal at Fiesta Bowl	Clemson	L 23–29
2020	Ryan Day	CFP Semifinal at Sugar Bowl	Clemson	W 49–28
2020	Ryan Day	CFP National Championship	Alabama	L 24–52
2021	Ryan Day	Rose Bowl	Utah	W 48–45
2022	Ryan Day	CFP Semifinal at Peach Bowl	Georgia	L 41–42
2023	Ryan Day	Cotton Bowl Classic	Missouri	L 3–14
2024	Ryan Day	CFP Quarterfinal at Rose Bowl	Oregon	W 41–21
2024	Ryan Day	CFP Semifinal at Cotton Bowl Classic	Texas	W 28–14
2024	Ryan Day	CFP National Championship	Notre Dame	W 34–23
2025	Ryan Day	CFP Quarterfinal at Cotton Bowl Classic	Miami	L 14–24

*note 2019–present

Bowl records:
Overall	New Year's Six	College Football Playoff
29–30	23–16	6–5

^{†} Vacated

== Home venues ==
- Recreation Park (1890–1897)
- Ohio Field (1898–1921)
- Ohio Stadium (1922–present)

=== Marching band ===
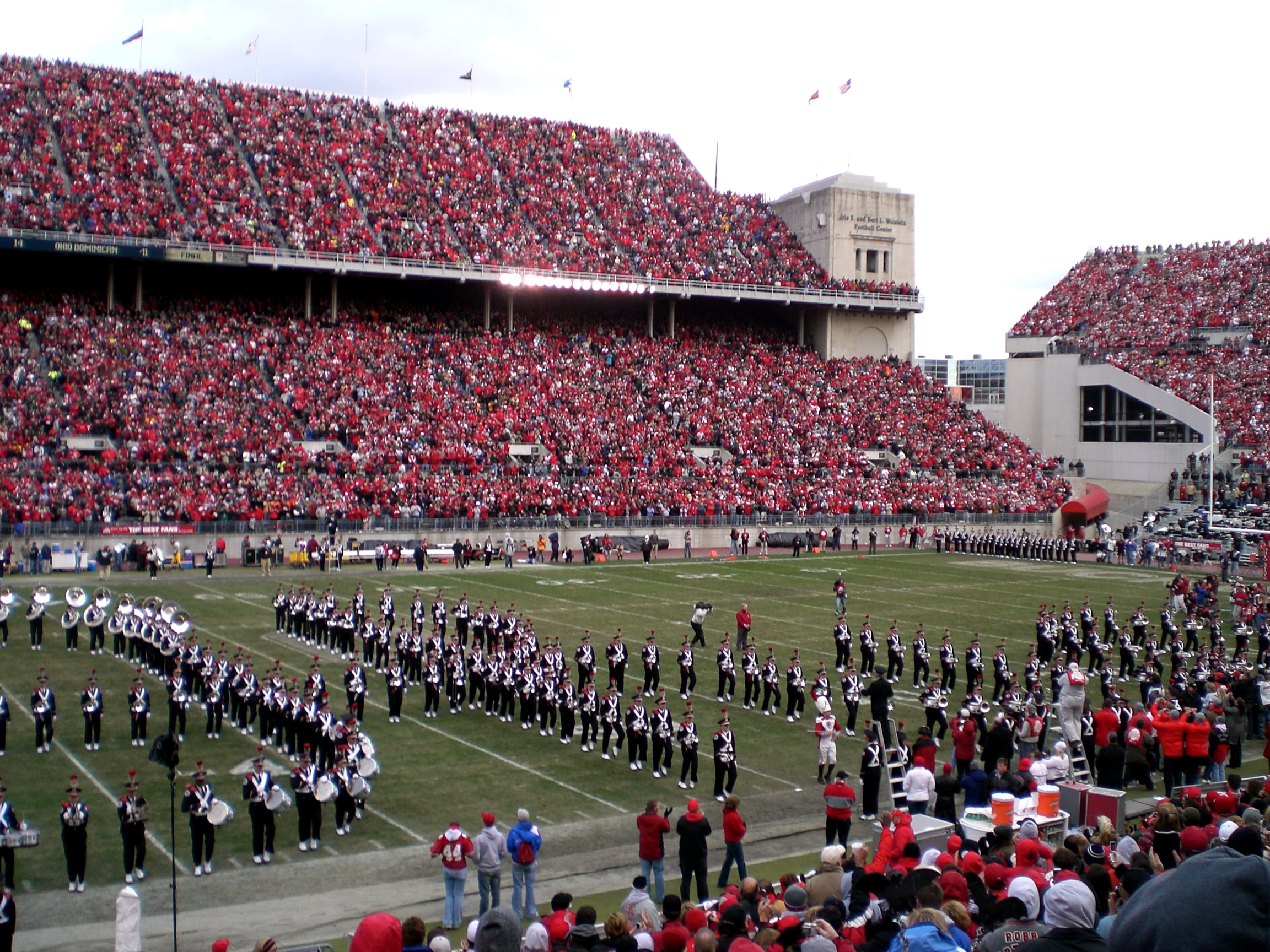
Script Ohio

Ohio State University Marching Band is the most visible and possibly best-known tradition of Ohio State football. Home games are preceded by four marching band traditions:

- Skull Session
- Ramp entrance
- Dotting the I
- Script Ohio

== Rivalries ==
=== Illinois ===
The series versus Illinois began in 1902 and became the longest continuous series in 2002 when the schools played in their 89th consecutive year. In 2007, Ohio State was given their only defeat of the regular season by the Illini. Through the 2026 season, Ohio State leads the series 69–30–4.

=== Michigan ===
Ohio State's first game with Michigan dates to 1897. Michigan leads the series 62–52–6 through the 2025 season. This rivalry is considered to be Buckeyes' biggest rivalry. All the appearances of the letter M on the Ohio State campus are crossed out with red tape. Halftime shows during OSU games often feature something bad happening to the Michigan logo.

=== Penn State ===
When Penn State was added to the Big Ten conference football play in 1993, every member was given two designated rivals, teams to be played every year, with the other conference teams rotated out of the schedule at regular intervals. For geographic convenience, the Big Ten named Penn State as Ohio State's new designated rival in addition to Michigan. Ohio State leads the series 26–14 through the 2025 season.

== Other rivals ==
=== Indiana ===
The football rivalry between Indiana and Ohio State dates back to 1901, with the teams meeting 99 times, where Ohio State leads the series 81–13–5. Both schools have been members of the Big Ten Conference for over a century, with Indiana joining in 1899 and Ohio State in 1912. Ohio State has defeated the Hoosiers three times in top-10 ranked matchups in 2020, 2024 and 2026. In 2025, No. 2 Indiana defeated No. 1 Ohio State in that season's Big Ten Championship Game, ending their 29-game skid against the Buckeyes.

=== Wisconsin ===
Ohio State's football series with Wisconsin, dates back to 1913, has been largely dominated by the Buckeyes. Ohio State leads the series 64–18–5, and has posted a 3–0 record in the Big Ten Championship Game against the Badgers.

== Coaches ==
The Buckeyes have had 24 head coaches in their 121-year history.

Of the team's nine national championships to date, Woody Hayes won five, with Paul Brown, Jim Tressel, Urban Meyer, and Ryan Day each having one.

== Personnel ==
=== Roster ===
2025 Ohio State Buckeyes football team roster
Players
Coaches
Offense

Pos.	#	Name	Class
WR	1	Brandon Inniss (C)	Jr
QB	3	Lincoln Kienholz	Jr
WR	4	Jeremiah Smith	So
WR	5	Mylan Graham	So
QB	6	Eli Brickhandler	GS
WR	7	Phillip Bell	Fr
WR	8	De'Zie Jones	Fr
QB	9	Tavien St. Clair	Fr
QB	10	Julian Sayin	So
WR	11	Quincy Porter	Fr
RB	12	CJ Donaldson	Sr
WR	13	Bryson Rodgers	Jr
QB	14	Trey Robinette	Fr
TE	15	Jelani Thurman	Jr
QB	16	Mason Maggs	Sr
WR	17	Carnell Tate	Jr
WR	18	Bodpegn Miller	Fr
RB	20	James Peoples	So
RB	21	Anthony "Turbo" Rogers	Fr
WR	23	Nolan Baudo	Jr
RB	24	Sam Dixon	So
RB	25	Bo Jackson	Fr
QB	26	Kolton Stover	Fr
RB	28	Stanley Jackson Jr.	So
WR	30	Preston Wolfe	So
RB	32	Isaiah West	Fr
WR	34	Brennen Schramm	Jr
OL	51	Luke Montgomery	Jr
OL	56	Isaiah Kema	Fr
OL	57	Ian Gecse	Jr
OL	58	Gabe VanSickle	So
OL	62	Joshua Padilla	Jr
OL	63	Julian Goines-Jackson	Sr
OL	64	Simon Lorentz	So
OL	65	Justin Terry	So
OL	67	Austin Siereveld (C)	Jr
OL	69	Ian Moore	So
OL	70	Phillip Daniels	Jr
OL	71	Jayvon McFadden	Fr
OL	72	Deontae Armstrong	So
OL	73	Devontae Armstrong	So
OL	74	Carter Lowe	Fr
OL	75	Carson Hinzman	Sr
OL	76	Jake Cook	Fr
OL	77	Tegra Tshabola	Sr
OT	78	Ethan Onianwa	Sr
WR	80	Shawn Lodge	Sr
WR	81	Damarion Witten	So
WR	82	David Adolph	Sr
TE	83	Nate Roberts	Fr
WR	84	Dorian Williams	So
TE	85	Bennett Christian	Sr
TE	86	Max Klare	Jr
TE	87	Brody Lennon	Fr
TE	88	Maxence LeBlanc	So
TE	89	Will Kacmarek	GS

Defense

Pos.	#	Name	Class
LB	0	Sonny Styles (C)	Sr
CB	1	Davison Igbinosun	Sr
S	2	Caleb Downs (C)	Jr
CB	3	Lorenzo Styles Jr.	GS
CB	5	Aaron Scott Jr.	So
CB	6	Devin Sanchez	Fr
CB	7	Jermaine Mathews Jr.	Jr
LB	8	Arvell Reese	Jr
S	9	Malik Hartford	Jr
S	10	Faheem Delane	Fr
LB	11	C. J. Hicks	Sr
CB	12	Bryce West	So
CB	13	Miles Lockhart	So
DL	14	Beau Atkinson	Sr
DL	15	Zion Grady	Fr
DB	16	Keenan Nelson Jr.	Sr
LB	17	Tarvos "TJ" Alford	Fr
S	18	Jaylen McClain	So
CB	19	Jordyn Woods	Fr
LB	20	Riley Pettijohn	Fr
LB	21	Brenten "Inky" Jones	Sr
LB	23	Garrett Stover	So
S	24	Deshawn Stewart	Fr
LB	25	Ty Howard	Sr
LB	26	Payton Pierce	So
S	28	Leroy Roker III	So
DB	29	Glorien Gough	Jr
S	30	Cody Haddad	Fr
S	32	JJ Sebert	So
LB	33	Eli Lee	Fr
CB	34	Buakri Miles Jr.	So
S	35	Jaystin Gwinn	Fr
CB	36	Omar Jah	Fr
LB	37	Zach Hayes	So
LB	38	Eli Riggs	So
LB	39	Joey Velazquez	GS
CB	43	Dianté Griffin	Sr
DE	44	Epi Sitanilei	Fr
S	46	Ryan Rudzinski	Jr
DL	48	Logan George	Jr
S	49	Gavin Thobe	Fr
LB	50	Alec DelSignore	Jr
DE	52	Joshua Mickens	Jr
DL	53	Will Smith Jr.	Jr
LB	54	Dylan Furshman	Fr
DE	55	Dominic Kirks	So
DL	59	Ahmed Tounkara	So
DL	88	Trajen Odom	Fr
DL	90	Eric Mensah	So
DL	91	Jarquez Carter	Fr
DE	92	Caden Curry	Sr
DT	93	Maxwell Roy	Fr
DL	94	Jason Moore	Jr
DT	95	Tywone Malone Jr.	GS
DE	96	Eddrick Houston	So
DE	97	Kenyatta Jackson Jr.	Sr
DL	98	Kayden McDonald	Jr

Special teams

Pos.	#	Name	Class
P	19	Nick McLarty	So
LS	35	Collin Johnson	Sr
K	38	Jayden Fielding	Sr
LS	41	Grant Mills	So
P	42	Joe McGuire	Jr
LS	43	John Ferlmann	GS
K	96	Jackson Courville	Jr

Head coach

- Ryan Day
- Larry Johnson – Associate head coach/defensive line
- Tim Walton – Assistant head coach/co-defensive coordinator/secondary/cornerbacks

Coordinators/assistant coaches

- Arthur Smith – Offensive coordinator
- Matt Patricia – Defensive coordinator
- Keenan Bailey – Co-offensive coordinator/tight ends
- Matt Guerrieri – Safeties/pass game coordinator
- Tyler Bowen – Offensive line/run game coordinator
- James Laurinaitis – Linebackers
- Carlos Locklyn – Running backs
- Billy Fessler – Quarterbacks
- Cortez Hankton – Wide receivers
- Mickey Marotti – Associate AD/director of football sport performance
- Rob Keys – Special teams coordinator
- Sam McGrath – Assistant linebackers
- Michael Hunter – Assistant defensive backs
- Gunner Daniel – Program assistant - special teams
- Devin Jordan – Program assistant - wide receivers
- Joshua Chorba – Program assistant - linebackers
- Tony Johnson – Analyst - running backs
- Charlie Dickey – Program assistant - offensive line
- Marcus Johnson – Assistant offensive line
- Wendy Laurent – Assistant tight ends
- Austin Fields – Quality control - offense
- Tim Hinton – Executive director for football relations/special assistant to the head coach
- Billy Yates – Quality control - defense
- Taver Johnson – Analyst - defensive backs
- Miguel Patrick – Quality control - defense
- Nate Ebner – Quality control - special teams
- Colin Keanu – Program assistant - quarterbacks
- Tony Washington – Program assistant - defensive line

Legend

- (C) Team captain
- (S) Suspended
- (I) Ineligible
- Injured
- Redshirt

Roster
Last update: August 6, 2025

=== Depth chart ===
Defense

S
3 Lorenzo Styles Jr.
12 Bryce West
13 Miles Lockhart

FS
18 Jaylen McClain
9 Malik Hartford
28 Leroy Roker III

WLB	SLB
6 Sonny Styles	8 Arvell Reese
20 Riley Pettijohn	26 Payton Pierce
17 Tarvos "TJ" Alford	23 Garrett Stover

SS
2 Caleb Downs
10 Faheem Delane
16 Keenan Nelson Jr.

CB
1 Davison Igbinosun
5 Aaron Scott Jr.
21 Brenten "Inky" Jones

DE	DT	DT	DE
97 Kenyatta Jackson Jr.	96 Eddrick Houston	98 Kayden McDonald	92 Caden Curry
14 Beau Atkinson	95 Tywone Malone Jr.	53 Will Smith Jr.	11 C. J. Hicks
15 Zion Grady	91 Jarquez Carter	94 Jason Moore	48 Logan George

CB
7 Jermaine Mathews Jr.
6 Devin Sanchez
19 Jordyn Woods

Offense

WR
4 Jeremiah Smith
5 Mylan Graham
7 Phillip Bell

WR
1 Brandon Inniss
13 Bryson Rodgers
8 De'Zie Jones

LT	LG	C	RG	RT
67 Austin Siereveld	51 Luke Montgomery	75 Carson Hinzman	77 Tegra Tshabola	70 Phillip Daniels
69 Ian Moore	76 Jake Cook	62 Joshua Padilla	58 Gabe VanSickle	78 Ethan Onianwa
74 Carter Lowe	73 Devontae Armstrong	56 Isaiah Kema	71 Jayvon McFadden	72 Deontae Armstrong

TE
89 Will Kacmarek
86 Max Klare
85 Bennett Christian

WR
17 Carnell Tate
11 Quincy Porter
82 David Adolph

QB
10 Julian Sayin
3 Lincoln Kienholz
9 Tavien St. Clair

Key reserves
Out (season)
RB 24 Sam Dixon
RB 21 Anthony "Turbo" Rogers
WR 18 Bodpegn Miller
TE 15 Jelani Thurman
TE 83 Nate Roberts
DE 55 Dominic Kirks
DE 52 Joshua Mickens
DE 44 Epi Sitanilei
DT 93 Maxwell Roy
DT 90 Eric Mensah
WLB 25 Ty Howard
CB 43 Dianté Griffin

RB
25 Bo Jackson
32 Isaiah West
20 James Peoples

Special teams
PK 38 Jayden Fielding
PK 96 Jackson Courville
P 42 Joe McGuire
P 19 Nick McLarty
KR 17 Carnell Tate
PR 1 Brandon Inniss
LS 43 John Ferlmann
H 42 Joe McGuire

As of November 23, 2025. Depth chart

== All-time records ==
=== All-time Big Ten records ===
This table reflects the results of Big Ten match ups when both OSU and its opponent were members of the conference through the 2025 season. Ohio State began Big Ten play in 1913. Examples of excluded results are Chicago after 1939, Michigan between 1907 and 1916, Michigan State before 1953, Penn State before 1993, and Nebraska before 2011 (see Big Ten History for further information). Ohio State's vacated wins from 2010 are not included (see 2010 Ohio State Buckeyes football team for further information). Match ups in the College Football Playoffs are not included.

Team	Big Ten wins	Big Ten losses	Big Ten ties	Winning percentage	Streak	First Big Ten meeting	Last meeting
Chicago Maroons	10	2	2	.786	Won 8	1920	1939
Illinois Fighting Illini	69	30	3	.691	Won 9	1914	2025
Indiana Hoosiers	81	12	5	.852	Won 29	1913	2024
Iowa Hawkeyes	50	15	3	.757	Won 2	1922	2024
Maryland Terrapins	9	0	0	1.000	Won 9	2014	2023
Michigan Wolverines	51	51	4	.500	Won 1	1918	2025
Michigan State Spartans	39	15	0	.722	Won 9	1953	2024
Minnesota Golden Gophers	48	7	0	.873	Won 6	1921	2025
Nebraska Cornhuskers	10	1	0	.909	Won 10	2011	2024
Northwestern Wildcats	67	14	1	.821	Won 11	1913	2024
Oregon Ducks	0	2	0	.000	Lost 2	2024	2026
Penn State Nittany Lions	24	8	0	.750	Won 9	1993	2025
Purdue Boilermakers	43	15	2	.733	Won 4	1919	2025
Rutgers Scarlet Knights	10	0	0	1.000	Won 10	2014	2025
UCLA Bruins	1	0	0	1.000	Won 1	2025	2025
USC Trojans	0	1	0	.000		2026	2026
Washington Huskies	1	0	0	1.000	Won 1	2025	2025
Wisconsin Badgers	64	18	5	.764	Won 11	1913	2025

== Individual awards and achievements ==
Through the 2006 season, Ohio State players have by a significant margin won more trophies than any other NCAA Division 1A program. Ohio State players have won 34 of the listed major awards, with the next closest being 26 (Oklahoma). Ohio State is the only university to have received each of the awards at least once. Of the five awards created prior to 1980 (Heisman, Lombardi, Maxwell, Outland, and Walter Camp), Ohio State has received the most with 25 (Notre Dame follows with 23).

=== Retired numbers ===
Ohio State Buckeyes retired numbers
No.	Player	Pos.	Tenure	No. ret.	Ref.
22	Les Horvath	HB/QB	1940–1942, 1944	2000	
27	Eddie George	RB	1992–1995	2001	
31	Vic Janowicz	HB	1949–1951	2000	
40	Howard Cassady	HB	1952–1955	2000	
45	Archie Griffin	RB	1972–1975	1999	
47	Chic Harley	HB	1916–1917, 1919	2004	
99	Bill Willis	T	1942–1944	2007	

=== Honored numbers ===
Although these numbers are cited as "retired" on Ohio State website, they are considered enshrined rather than retired, and are available to be worn. All previously retired jersey numbers remain retired.

Ohio State Buckeyes honored numbers
No.	Player	Pos.	Tenure	No. ret.	Ref.
10	Troy Smith	QB	2003–2006	2014	

=== Block O Jersey ===
In 2020, the NCAA approved the use of the No. 0. In order to further pay tribute to Bill Willis, Coach Day decided to start a new tradition and choose the player who will wear the number each season.

Season	Name	Pos.	Class	Previous No.
2020	Jonathon Cooper	DE	Senior (RS)	18
2021	Thayer Munford	OT	Senior (RS)	75 (Note: Due to number restrictions, Munford could not wear number 0. Instead, he wore his regular number and honored the award with a patch.)
2022	Kamryn Babb	WR	Senior (RS)	1
2023	Xavier Johnson	WR	Senior (RS)	10
2024	Cody Simon	LB	Senior (RS)	30
2025	Sonny Styles	LB	Senior	6
2026	Brandon Inniss	WR	Senior	1

=== Honored coaches ===
Three head coaches have also been honored by the Buckeyes, with banners at Ohio Stadium:

- Paul Brown (1941–43) - led OSU to their first National Championship in 1942
- Woody Hayes (1951–78) - led OSU to school records of 205 wins, five National Championships (1954, 1957, 1961, 1968, 1970), and 13 Big Ten Championships
- Jim Tressel (2001–10) - led OSU to six Big Ten championships and 2002 National Championship.

=== Award winners ===
==== Heisman Trophy winners ====
Ohio State players have won the Heisman Trophy seven times, which ties Notre Dame and Oklahoma for the second most awards for any school, behind only USC with eight. Archie Griffin is the only two-time recipient in the history of the award.

Season	Name	Pos.	Class	Points
1944	Les Horvath	RB	Senior	412
1950	Vic Janowicz	RB	Junior	633
1955	Howard "Hopalong" Cassady	RB	Senior	2219
1974	Archie Griffin	RB	Junior	1920
1975	Archie Griffin (2)	RB	Senior	1800
1995	Eddie George	RB	Senior	1460
2006	Troy Smith	QB	Senior	2540

==== Lombardi Award ====
Ohio State players have won the Lombardi Award six times:

- 1970: Jim Stillwagon
- 1973: John Hicks
- 1987: Chris Spielman
- 1995: Orlando Pace
- 1996: Orlando Pace
- 2005: A. J. Hawk

==== Maxwell Award ====
Four Ohio State players have won the Maxwell Award:

- 1955: Howard Cassady
- 1961: Bob Ferguson
- 1975: Archie Griffin
- 1995: Eddie George

==== Outland Trophy ====
Four Ohio State players have won the Outland Trophy:

- 1956: Jim Parker
- 1970: Jim Stillwagon
- 1973: John Hicks
- 1996: Orlando Pace

==== Walter Camp Award ====
Ohio State players have won the Walter Camp Award four times:

- 1974: Archie Griffin
- 1975: Archie Griffin
- 1995: Eddie George
- 2006: Troy Smith

==== Fred Biletnikoff Award ====
Ohio State Players have won the Fred Biletnikoff Award twice:

- 1995: Terry Glenn
- 2023: Marvin Harrison Jr.

==== Bronko Nagurski Trophy ====
Ohio State Players have won the Bronko Nagurski Trophy award twice:

- 2006: James Laurinaitis
- 2019: Chase Young

==== Dick Butkus Award ====
Ohio State players have won the Dick Butkus Award twice:

- 1997: Andy Katzenmoyer
- 2007: James Laurinaitis

==== Jim Thorpe Award ====
Ohio State players have won the Jim Thorpe Award three times:

- 1998: Antoine Winfield
- 2008: Malcolm Jenkins
- 2025: Caleb Downs

==== Rimington Trophy ====
Ohio State players have won the Dave Rimington Trophy four times:

- 2001: LeCharles Bentley
- 2016: Pat Elflein
- 2017: Billy Price
- 2024: Seth McLaughlin

==== Lott Trophy ====
Ohio State players have won the Lot IMPACT Trophy two times:

- 2008: James Laurinaitis
- 2025: Caleb Downs

==== Chicago Tribune Silver Football ====
Ohio State players have won the Chicago Tribune Silver Football award 23 times:

- 1930: Wes Fesler
- 1941: Jack Graf
- 1944: Les Horvath
- 1945: Ollie Cline
- 1950: Vic Janowicz
- 1955: Howard "Hopalong" Cassady
- 1973: Archie Griffin
- 1974: Archie Griffin
- 1975: Cornelius Greene
- 1981: Art Schlichter
- 1984: Keith Byars
- 1995: Eddie George
- 1996: Orlando Pace
- 1998: Joe Germaine
- 2006: Troy Smith
- 2012: Braxton Miller
- 2013: Braxton Miller
- 2015: Ezekiel Elliott
- 2016: J. T. Barrett
- 2018: Dwayne Haskins
- 2019: Chase Young
- 2020: Justin Fields
- 2023: Marvin Harrison Jr.

==== Graham–George Offensive Player of the Year ====
Ohio State players have won the Graham–George Offensive Player of the Year 13 times:

- 1995: Eddie George
- 1996: Orlando Pace
- 1998: Joe Germaine
- 2006: Troy Smith
- 2012: Braxton Miller
- 2013: Braxton Miller (2)
- 2015: Ezekiel Elliott
- 2018: Dwayne Haskins
- 2019: Justin Fields
- 2020: Justin Fields (2)
- 2021: C. J. Stroud
- 2022: C. J. Stroud (2)
- 2023: Marvin Harrison Jr.

==== Nagurski–Woodson Defensive Player of the Year ====
Ohio State players have won the Nagurski–Woodson Defensive Player of the Year 12 times:

- 1992: Steve Tovar
- 1993: Dan Wilkinson
- 1996: Shawn Springs
- 2002: Mike Doss
- 2003: Will Smith
- 2005: A. J. Hawk
- 2007: James Laurinaitis
- 2008: James Laurinaitis (2)
- 2012: John Simon
- 2014: Joey Bosa
- 2019: Chase Young
- 2025: Caleb Downs

==== Other ====
- Eddie George received the Doak Walker Award in 1995
- B. J. Sander received the Ray Guy Award in 2003
- Mike Nugent received the Lou Groza Award in 2004
- Troy Smith received the Davey O'Brien Award in 2006
- Ezekiel Elliott received the James E. Sullivan Award in 2014
- Chase Young received the Chuck Bednarik Award and Ted Hendricks Award in 2019.

=== All-American and All-Conference honors ===
Through 2017, 199 Buckeyes have been named first team All-Americans since 1914. Of those 85 have been consensus picks. 388 have been named to the All-Big Ten team, and 16 have won the Chicago Tribune Silver Football, the Big Ten's Most Valuable Player award, including Troy Smith for 2006. The Athletic Directors of the Big Ten Conference voted Eddie George Big Ten-Jesse Owens Athlete of the Year for 1996.

On November 22, 2006, ten Buckeyes were named to either the Coaches or Conference media All-Big Ten First Team selections for the 2006 season, and seven were named to both. Troy Smith was named Big Ten Offensive Player of the Year. Four other Buckeyes received Second Team honors.

=== List of All-Americans ===
All records per OSU Athletics.

1910s

- 1914: Boyd Cherry (E)
- 1916: Chic Harley (B), Robert Karch (T)
- 1917: Charles Bolen (E), Harold Courtney (E), Chic Harley (B), Kelley VanDyne (C)
- 1918: Clarence MacDonald (E)
- 1919: Chic Harley (B), Gaylord Stinchcomb (B)

1920s

- 1920: Iolas Huffman (G), Gaylord Stinchcomb (B)
- 1921: Iolas Huffman (G), Cyril Myers (E)
- 1923: Harry Workman (QB)
- 1924: Harold Cunningham (E)
- 1925: Edwin Hess (G)
- 1926: Edwin Hess (G), Marty Karow (HB), Leo Raskowski (T)
- 1927: Leo Raskowski (T)
- 1928: Wes Fesler (E)
- 1929: Wes Fesler (E)

1930s

- 1930: Wes Fesler (E), Lew Hinchman (HB)
- 1931: Carl Cramer (QB), Lew Hinchman (HB)
- 1932: Joseph Gailus (G), Sid Gillman (E), Lew Hinchman (HB), Ted Rosequist (T)
- 1933: Joseph Gailus (G)
- 1934: Regis Monahan (G), Merle Wendt (E)
- 1935: Gomer Jones (C), Merle Wendt (E)
- 1936: Charles Hamrick (T), Inwood Smith (G), Merle Wendt (E)
- 1937: Carl Kaplanoff (T), Jim McDonald (QB), Ralph Wolf (C), Gust Zarnas (G)
- 1939: Vic Marino (G), Esco Sarkkinen (E), Don Scott (HB)

1940s

- 1940:Don Scott (C)
- 1942: Robert Shaw (E), Charles Csuri (T), Lin Houston (G), Paul Sarringhaus (HB), Gene Fekete (E)
- 1943: Bill Willis (T)
- 1944: Jack Dugger (E), Bill Willis (T), William Hackett (G), Les Horvath (QB/HB)
- 1945: Warren Amling (G), Ollie Cline (FB), Russell Thomas (T)
- 1946: Warren Amling (G), Cecil Souders (E)

1950s

- 1950: Robert Momsen (T), Robert McMullogh (C), Vic Janowicz (HB)
- 1952: Mike Takacs (G)
- 1954: Dean Dugger (E), Howard Cassady (HB), Jim Reichenbach (G)
- 1955: Jim Parker (G), Howard Cassady (HB)
- 1956: Jim Parker (G)
- 1957: Aurealius Thomas (G)
- 1958: Jim Houston (E), Jim Marshall (T), Bob White (E)
- 1959: Jim Houston (E)

1960s

- 1960: Bob Ferguson (FB)
- 1961: Bob Ferguson (FB)
- 1964: Jim Davidson (T), Ike Kelley (LB), Arnie Chonko (DB)
- 1965: Doug Van Horn (G), Ike Kelley (LB)
- 1966: Ray Pryor (C)
- 1968: Dave Foley (OT), Rufus Mayes (OT)
- 1969: Jim Stillwagon (G), Rex Kern (QB), Jim Otis (FB), Ted Provost (CB), Jack Tatum (CB)

1970s

- 1970: Jan White (TE), Jim Stillwagon (MG), John Brockington (FB), Jack Tatum (CB), Mike Sensibaugh (S), Tim Anderson (CB)
- 1971: Tom DeLeone (C)
- 1972: John Hicks (OT), Randy Gradishar (LB)
- 1973: John Hicks (OT), Randy Gradishar (LB), Van DeCree (DE), Archie Griffin (TB)
- 1974: Van Ness DeCree (DE), Kurt Schumacher (OT), Steve Myers (C), Pete Cusick (DT), Archie Griffin (TB), Neal Colzie (CB), Tom Skladany (P)
- 1975: Ted Smith (OG), Archie Griffin (TB), Tim Fox (S), Tom Skladany (P)
- 1976: Bob Brudzinski (DE), Chris Ward (OT), Tom Skladany (P)
- 1977: Chris Ward (OT), Aaron Brown (NG), Tom Cousineau (LB), Ray Griffin (S)
- 1978: Tom Cousineau (LB)
- 1979: Ken Fritz (OG), Art Schlichter (QB)

1980s

- 1982: Marcus Marek (LB)
- 1984: Jim Lachey (OG), Keith Byars (TB)
- 1985: Pepper Johnson (LB)
- 1986: Cris Carter (SE), Chris Spielman (LB)
- 1987: Chris Spielman (LB), Tom Tupa (P)
- 1988: Jeff Uhlenhake (C)

1990s

- 1991: Steve Tovar (LB)
- 1992: Steve Tovar (LB)
- 1993: Korey Stringer (OT), Dan Wilkinson (DT)
- 1994: Korey Stringer (OT)
- 1995: Eddie George (TB), Terry Glenn (FL), Orlando Pace (OT), Mike Vrabel (DE)
- 1996: Orlando Pace (OT), Shawn Springs (CB), Mike Vrabel (DE)
- 1997: Andy Katzenmoyer (LB), Rob Murphy (OG), Antoine Winfield (CB)
- 1998: David Boston (SE), Damon Moore (SS), Rob Murphy (OG), Antoine Winfield (CB)
- 1999: Na'il Diggs (LB)

2000s

- 2000: Mike Doss (SS)
- 2001: LeCharles Bentley (C), Mike Doss (SS)
- 2002: Mike Doss (SS), Andy Groom (P), Mike Nugent (PK), Matt Wilhelm (LB)
- 2003: Will Allen (DB), Will Smith (DE)
- 2004: Mike Nugent (PK), A. J. Hawk (LB)
- 2005: A. J. Hawk (LB), Donte Whitner (SS), Nick Mangold (C)
- 2006: Troy Smith (QB), James Laurinaitis (LB), Quinn Pitcock (DL), Ted Ginn Jr. (PR)
- 2007: James Laurinaitis (LB), Kirk Barton (OT), Vernon Gholston (DE), Malcolm Jenkins (DB)
- 2008: James Laurinaitis (LB), Malcolm Jenkins (CB)
- 2009: Kurt Coleman (DB)

2010s

- 2010: Mike Brewster (C), Chimdi Chekwa (DB)
- 2012: Johnathan Hankins (DT), Bradley Roby (CB)
- 2013: Ryan Shazier (LB), Jack Mewhort (T)
- 2014: Joey Bosa (DE). Michael Bennett (DL)
- 2015: Vonn Bell (SAF), Joey Bosa (DE), Taylor Decker (OT), Adolphus Washington (DT)
- 2016: Pat Elflein (C), Malik Hooker (SAF), Billy Price (G), Curtis Samuel (HB)
- 2017: Billy Price (C), Denzel Ward (CB) Nick Bosa (DE)
- 2019: Chase Young (DE), Jeff Okudah (CB), J. K. Dobbins (AP), Wyatt Davis (G)

2020s

- 2020: Wyatt Davis (G), Shaun Wade (CB)
- 2021: Thayer Munford (OT), Chris Olave (WR), Nicholas Petit-Frere (OT), Garrett Wilson (WR)
- 2022: Marvin Harrison Jr. (WR), Paris Johnson Jr. (OT)
- 2023: Marvin Harrison Jr. (WR)
- 2024: Caleb Downs (S), Seth McLaughlin (C)
- 2025: Caleb Downs (S), Kayden McDonald (DL), Jeremiah Smith (WR), Arvell Reese (LB)

=== Team MVP ===
1930: Wes Fesler – (E) – Big Ten MVP
1931: Robert Haubrich – (OT)
1932: Lew Hinchman – (HB)
1933: Mickey Vuchinich – (FB)
1934: Gomer Jones – (C)
1935: Gomer Jones – (C)
1936: Ralph Wolf – (C)
1937: Ralph Wolf – (C)
1938: Jim Langhurst – (FB)
1939: Steve Andrako – (C)
1940: Don Scott – (QB)
1941: Jack Graf – (FB) – Big Ten MVP
1942: Chuck Csuri – (OT)
1943: Gordon Appleby – (C)
1944: Les Horvath – (QB) – Big Ten MVP
1945: Ollie Cline – (FB) – Big Ten MVP
1946: Cecil Souders – (E)
1947: Dave Templeton – (G)
1948: Joe Whisler – (FB)
1949: Jack Lininger – (C)
1950: Vic Janowicz – (HB) – Big Ten MVP
1951: Vic Janowicz – (HB)
1952: Fred Bruney – (HB)
1953: George Jacoby – (T)
1954: Howard Cassady – (HB)
1955: Howard Cassady – (HB) – Big Ten MVP
1956: Jim Parker – (G)
1957: Bill Jobko – (G)
1958: Jim Houston – (E)
1959: Jim Houston – (E)
1960: Tom Matte – (QB)
1961: Bob Ferguson – (FB)
1962: Billy Armstrong – (C)
1963: Matt Snell – (FB)
1964: Ed Orazen – (DL)
1965: Doug Van Horn – (OG)
1966: Ray Pryor – (C)
1967: Dirk Worden – (LB)
1968: Mark Stier – (LB)
1969: Jim Otis – (FB)
1970: Jim Stillwagon – (DL)
1971: Tom DeLeone – (C)
1972: George Hasenohrl – (DL)
1973: Archie Griffin – (RB) – Big Ten MVP
1974: Archie Griffin – (RB) – Big Ten MVP
1975: Cornelius Greene – (QB) – Big Ten MVP
1976: Bob Brudzinski – (DE)
1977: Dave Adkins – (LB)
1978: Tom Cousineau – (LB)
1979: Jim Laughlin – (LB)
1980: Calvin Murray – (TB)
1981: Art Schlichter – (QB) – Big Ten MVP
1982: Tim Spencer – (RB)
1983: John Frank – (TE)
1984: Keith Byars – (RB) – Big Ten MVP
1985: Jim Karsatos – (QB)
1986: Cris Carter – (WR)
1987: Chris Spielman – (LB)
1988: Jeff Uhlenhake – (C)
1989: Derek Isaman – (LB)
1990: Jeff Graham – (WR)
1991: Carlos Snow – (TB)
1992: Kirk Herbstreit – (QB)
1993: Raymont Harris – (TB)
1994: Korey Stringer – (OT)
1995: Eddie George – (TB) – Big Ten MVP
1996: Orlando Pace – (OT) – Big Ten MVP
1997: Antoine Winfield – (DB)
1998: Joe Germaine – (QB) – Big Ten MVP
1999: Ahmed Plummer – (DB)
2000: Derek Combs – (TB)
2001: Jonathan Wells – (TB)
2002: Craig Krenzel – (QB) / Chris Gamble – (WR/DB)
2003: Michael Jenkins – (WR)
2004: Mike Nugent – (PK)
2005: A. J. Hawk – (LB)
2006: Troy Smith – (QB) – Big Ten MVP
2007: Chris Wells – (TB)
2008: Chris Wells – (TB)
2009: Kurt Coleman – (SS)
2010: Dane Sanzenbacher – (WR)
2011: Daniel Herron – (TB)
2012: Braxton Miller – (QB) – Big Ten MVP
2013: Braxton Miller – (QB) – Big Ten MVP
2014: Evan Spencer – (WR)
2015: Ezekiel Elliott – (RB) – Big Ten MVP
2016: Malik Hooker – (SAF) / Pat Elflein – (C)
2017: Sam Hubbard – (DE)
2018: Dwayne Haskins – (QB)
2019: Justin Fields – (QB) / Chase Young – (DE) – Big Ten MVP
2020: Justin Fields – (QB) – Big Ten MVP
2021: C. J. Stroud – (QB)
2022: C. J. Stroud – (QB)
2023: Marvin Harrison Jr - (WR) – Big Ten MVP

=== Paul "Bear" Bryant Award ===
- 2002: Jim Tressel

=== AFCA Coach of the Year ===
- 1944: Carroll Widdoes
- 1957: Woody Hayes
- 1979: Earle Bruce
- 2002: Jim Tressel

== Academic awards and achievements ==
=== College Sports Information Directors of America Academic All-America ===
==== Academic All-American Hall of Fame ====
- 1992: Randy Gradishar

==== Academic All-American Player of the Year ====
- 2003: Craig Krenzel (QB)

==== Academic All-Americans ====
1952: John Borton (QB)
1954: Dick Hilnski (T)
1958: Bob White (FB)
1961: Tom Perdue (End)
1965: Bill Ridder (MG)
1966: Dave Foley (OT)
1967: Dave Foley (OT)
1968: Dave Foley (OT)
1969: Bill Urbanik (DT)
1971: Rick Simon (OT)
1973: Randy Gradishar (LB)
1974: Brian Baschnagel (RB)
1975: Brian Baschnagel (RB)
1976: Pete Johnson# (FB) and Bill Lukens# (OG)
1977: Jeff Logan (RB)
1980: Marcus Marek (LB)
1982: Joe Smith# (OT) and John Frank# (TE)
1983: John Frank (TE) and Dave Crecelius (DT)
1984: Dave Crecelius# (DT), Mike Lanese# (WR), and Anthony Tiuliani (DT)
1985: Mike Lanese (WR)

1987: Joe Staysniak (OT)
1989: Joe Staysniak (OT)
1990: Greg Smith (DL)
1992: Len Hartman# (OG) and Greg Smith# (DL)
1995: Greg Bellisari (LB)
1996: Greg Bellisari (LB)
1998: Jerry Rudzinski (LB)
1999: Ahmed Plummer (CB)
2002: Craig Krenzel (QB)
2003: Craig Krenzel (QB)
2006: Anthony Gonzalez# (WR) and Stan White Jr.# (FB)
2007: Brian Robiskie (WR)
2008: Brian Robiskie (WR)
2014: Jacoby Boren (C)
2015: Jacoby Boren# (C) and Jack Willoughby# (K)
2016: Sam Hubbard (DL)
2017: Jordan Fuller (SAF)
2018: Jordan Fuller (SAF)
2019: Jordan Fuller (SAF)
2024: Donovan Jackson# (OG/OT), Quinshon Judkins (RB) and Seth McLaughlin# (C)
# denotes first team

=== National Football Foundation and College Football Hall of Fame ===
==== William V. Campbell Trophy ====
- 1995 Bobby Hoying
- 2003 Craig Krenzel

==== National Scholar-Athlete Awards ====
- 1965 Willard Sander
- 1968 David Foley
- 1970 Rex Kern
- 1973 Randy Gradishar
- 1975 Brian Baschnagel
- 1979 Jim Laughlin
- 1982 Joe Smith
- 1983 John Frank
- 1984 Dave Crecelius
- 1985 Mike Lanese
- 1989 Joe Staysniak
- 1990 Greg Frey
- 1992 Greg Smith
- 1994 Joey Galloway
- 1995 Bobby Hoying
- 1996 Greg Bellisari
- 1999 Ahmed Plummer
- 2003 Craig Krenzel
- 2008 Brian Robiskie
- 2015 Jacoby Boren
- 2019 Jordan Fuller

== Hall of Fame inductees ==
=== College Football Hall of Fame ===
Name	Position	Year Inducted
Howard Jones	Head coach	1951
Chic Harley	HB/QB	1951
Wes Fesler	End	1954
John Wilce	Head coach	1954
Les Horvath	HB/QB	1969
Bill Willis	DT	1971
Francis Schmidt	Head coach	1971
Ernie Godfrey	Asst. Coach	1972
Gaylord Stinchcomb	HB/QB	1973
Jim Parker	OT	1974
Gust Zarnas	OG	1975
Vic Janowicz	HB	1976
Jim Daniell	OT	1977
Gomer Jones	C	1978
Howard Cassady	HB	1979
Woody Hayes	Head coach	1983
Warren Amling	OG	1984
Archie Griffin	RB	1986
Doyt Perry	Asst. Coach	1988
Sid Gillman	Asst. Coach	1989
Aurealius Thomas	OG	1989
Jim Stillwagon	DT	1991
Bo Schembechler	Asst. Coach	1993
Bob Fergueson	FB	1996
Randy Gradishar	LB	1998
John Hicks	OT	2001
Earle Bruce	Head coach	2002
Jack Tatum	S	2004
Jim Houston	DE	2005
Rex Kern	QB	2007
John Cooper	Head coach	2008
Chris Spielman	LB	2009
Eddie George	RB	2011
Orlando Pace	OT	2013
Jim Tressel	Head coach	2015
Tom Cousineau	LB	2016
Keith Byars	HB	2020
Rudy Hubbard	Asst. Coach	2021
Mike Doss	S	2022
Chris Ward	OT	2024
Urban Meyer	Head coach	2025
James Laurinaitis	LB	2026

=== Pro Football Hall of Fame ===
Name	Position	Year Inducted
Paul Brown	Coach	1967
Jim Parker	OT	1973
Lou Groza	K	1974
Dante Lavelli	End	1975
Bill Willis	DT	1977
Sid Gillman	Coach	1983
Paul Warfield	WR	1983
Dick LeBeau	CB	2010
Cris Carter	WR	2013
Orlando Pace	OT	2016
Randy Gradishar	LB	2024

== Media ==
The Buckeyes are covered on the radio by Ohio State Sports Network, operated by Learfield IMG College. WBNS/Columbus (1460 AM) and sister station WBNS-FM/Columbus (97.1 FM) serve as flagship stations, with more than 60 affiliates in Ohio, and two additional affiliates in West Virginia. Paul Keels is the play-by-play announcer, while former Buckeye left guard Jim Lachey serves as color analyst. They are joined by sideline reporter Tyler Danberg and Skip Mosic, host of the network pregame and halftime shows.

WBNS-TV (channel 10) in Columbus is the long-standing "official TV home" of the Buckeyes, airing the official coach's show Game Time with Ryan Day.

In addition, Ohio State football games are broadcast by their student radio organization, Scarlet and Gray Sports Radio on OhioStateSports.net

== Future conference opponents ==
Schedule announced October 5, 2023

2026	2027	2028
at Indiana	at Michigan*	at Illinois
at Iowa	at Minnesota	at Maryland
at Nebraska	at Northwestern	at Penn State
at USC	at Oregon	at UCLA
Illinois	at Rutgers	Michigan*
Maryland	Michigan State	Minnesota
Michigan*	Nebraska	Rutgers
Northwestern	Purdue	Washington
Oregon	USC	Wisconsin

(*) denotes protected matchup

== Future non-conference opponents ==
Announced schedules as of September 25, 2026.

2027	2028	2029	2030	2031	2032	2033	2034	2035	2036
Bowling Green (8/28)	Buffalo (9/2)	Navy (9/1)	Nevada (9/7)	Georgia (8/30)				Boston College (9/15)	at Boston College (9/13)
New Hampshire (9/11)	at Alabama (9/9)	Charlotte (9/8)	at Georgia (9/14)						
Alabama (9/18)	Northern Illinois (9/16)	Youngstown State (9/15)							

- Ohio State has no opponents scheduled for 2032, 2033, or 2034.

== Fan base ==
In 2011, a study conducted by Nate Silver of the New York Times, which he described as "not quite scientific," determined that Ohio State had the most fans of any college football team.
