= 2025 Alabama Crimson Tide football team =

American college football season

2025 Alabama Crimson Tide football

SEC Championship Game, L 7–28 vs. Georgia

CFP First Round, W 34–24 at Oklahoma Rose Bowl (CFP Quarterfinal), L 3–38 vs. Indiana
- Conference: Southeastern Conference

Ranking
- Coaches: No. 9
- AP: No. 9
- Record: 11–4 (7–1 SEC)
- Head coach: Kalen DeBoer (2nd season)
- Offensive coordinator: Ryan Grubb (1st season)
- Co-offensive coordinators: JaMarcus Shephard (2nd season); Nick Sheridan (2nd season)
- Offensive scheme: Spread / air raid
- Defensive coordinator: Kane Wommack (2nd season)
- Co-defensive coordinator: Maurice Linguist (2nd season)
- Base defense: 4–2–5, Swarm
- Captains: Ty Simpson; Parker Brailsford; Tim Keenan III; Deontae Lawson
- Home stadium: Saban Field at Bryant–Denny Stadium

2025 Southeastern Conference football standings
| | Conf. | | | Overall |
| Team | W | | L | W | | L |
|---|---|---|---|---|---|---|
| No. 9 Alabama y^ | 7 | – | 1 | 11 | – | 4 |
| No. 6 Georgia y$^ | 7 | – | 1 | 12 | – | 2 |
| No. 3 Ole Miss ^ | 7 | – | 1 | 13 | – | 2 |
| No. 8 Texas A&M ^ | 7 | – | 1 | 11 | – | 2 |
| No. 13 Oklahoma ^ | 6 | – | 2 | 10 | – | 3 |
| No. 12 Texas | 6 | – | 2 | 10 | – | 3 |
| No. 15 Vanderbilt | 6 | – | 2 | 10 | – | 3 |
| Missouri | 4 | – | 4 | 8 | – | 5 |
| Tennessee | 4 | – | 4 | 8 | – | 5 |
| LSU | 3 | – | 5 | 7 | – | 6 |
| Kentucky | 2 | – | 6 | 5 | – | 7 |
| Florida | 2 | – | 6 | 4 | – | 8 |
| Auburn | 1 | – | 7 | 5 | – | 7 |
| Mississippi State | 1 | – | 7 | 5 | – | 8 |
| South Carolina | 1 | – | 7 | 4 | – | 8 |
| Arkansas | 0 | – | 8 | 2 | – | 10 |
Championship: Georgia 28, Alabama 7
^ – College Football Playoff participant; $ – Conference champion; y – Championship game participant; Rankings from AP Poll

The 2025 Alabama Crimson Tide football team represented the University of Alabama during the 2025 NCAA Division I FBS football season. The season was the Crimson Tide's 131st overall season, and 92nd as a member of the Southeastern Conference (SEC). The Crimson Tide played their home games on Saban Field at Bryant–Denny Stadium located in Tuscaloosa, Alabama, under second year coach Kalen DeBoer.

== Offseason ==
Positions key
| Offense | Defense | Special teams |
|---|---|---|
| QB — Quarterback; RB — Running back; FB — Fullback; WR — Wide receiver; TE — Tight end; OL — Offensive lineman; T — Tackle; G — Guard; C — Center | DL — Defensive lineman; DT — Defensive tackle (Note: Includes nose tackle (NT)); DE — Defensive end; EDGE — Edge rusher; LB — Linebacker (Note: Includes middle linebacker (MLB/MIKE), weakside linebacker (WILL), strongside linebacker (SAM), off-ball linebacker, and outside linebacker (OLB)); DB — Defensive back; CB — Cornerback; S — Safety (Note: Includes free safety (FS) and strong safety (SS)) | K — Kicker (Note: Also known as a placekicker (PK)); P — Punter; LS — Long snapper; RS — Return specialist (Note: Includes kickoff and punt returners) |

=== Departures ===
==== Team departures ====
Over the course of the off-season, Alabama lost 41 total players. 25 players in transfer portal, 13 players graduated, 3 players declared for the 2025 NFL draft.

2025 Alabama offseason departures
| Name | Pos. | Height | Weight | Year | Hometown | Notes |
|---|---|---|---|---|---|---|
| Graham Nicholson | K | 6'0 | 185 | Senior | Cincinnati, OH | Graduated |
| CJ Dippre | TE | 6'5 | 260 | Sophomore | Scranton, PA | Graduated/Declared by 2025 NFL Draft |
| Malachi Moore | CB | 6'0 | 198 | Graduated Student | Trussville, AL | Graduated/Declared by 2025 NFL Draft |
| Alijah Mays | DB | 5′11 | 195 | Senior | Pinson, AL | Graduated |
| Adam Thorsland | TE | 6'5 | 232 | Senior | Walhalla, SC | Graduated |
| Graham Roten | OL | 6'3 | 285 | Senior | Fairview, TN | Graduated |
| James Burnip | P | 6′6 | 220 | Redshirt Senior | Mount Macedon, Victoria | Graduated |
| Kade Wehby | LS | 5'9 | 185 | Senior | Plantation, FL | Graduated |
| Kneeland Hibbett | LS | 6′2 | 245 | Senior | Florence, AL | Graduated |
| Robbie Ouzts | TE | 6′4 | 258 | Senior | Rock Hill, SC | Graduated |
| Tim Smith | DL | 6'4 | 302 | Graduate Student | Gifford, FL | Graduated/Declared by 2025 NFL Draft |
| Que Robinson | LB | 6'5 | 231 | (redshirt) Senior | Birmingham, AL | Graduated/Declared by 2025 NFL Draft |
| Jalen Milroe | QB | 6'2 | 220 | Redshirt Junior | Katy, TX | Declared by 2025 NFL Draft |
| Jihaad Campbell | LB | 6'3 | 230 | Junior | Erial, NJ | Declared by 2025 NFL Draft |
| Tyler Booker | OL | 6'5 | 332 | Junior | New Haven, CT | Declared by 2025 NFL Draft |

==== Outgoing transfers ====
Twenty-five Alabama players elected to enter the NCAA Transfer Portal during or after the 2024 season.

| Name | No. | Pos. | Height | Weight | Hometown | Year | New school | Source |
|---|---|---|---|---|---|---|---|---|
| Kendrick Law | 1 | WR | 5'11" | 201 | Shreveport, LA | Junior | Kentucky | |
| Emmanuel Henderson | 3 | WR | 6'1" | 185 | Hartford, AL | Junior | Kansas | |
| Caleb Odom | 18 | WR | 6'5" | 215 | Carrollton, GA | Freshman | Ole Miss | |
| Naquil Bertrand | 52 | OL | 6'6" | 340 | Philadelphia, PA | Freshman | Syracuse | |
| Dylan Lonergan | 12 | QB | 6'2" | 212 | Snellville, GA | Redshirt Freshman | Boston College | |
| Damon Payne Jr. | 44 | DL | 6'4" | 313 | Belleville, MI | Junior | Michigan | |
| DeVonta Smith | 8 | CB | 6'0" | 194 | Cincinnati, OH | Junior | Notre Dame | |
| Justice Haynes | 22 | RB | 5'11" | 205 | Buford, GA | Junior | Michigan | |
| Hunter Osborne | 33 | DL | 6'4" | 298 | Trussville, AL | Redshirt Freshman | Virginia | |
| Miles McVay | 58 | OL | 6'4" | 215 | East Saint Louis, IL | Redshirt Freshman | North Carolina | |
| Kobe Prentice | 6 | WR | 5'10" | 171 | Calera, AL | Senior | Baylor | |
| Jahili Hurley | 25 | DB | 6'2" | 170 | Florence, AL | Redshirt Freshman | Kansas | |
| Keanu Koht | 19 | LB | 6'4" | 232 | Vero Beach, FL | Redshirt Sophomore | Vanderbilt | |
| Jaheim Oatis | 91 | DL | 6'5" | 328 | Columbia, MS | Junior | Colorado | |
| Jaren Hamilton | 16 | WR | 6'1" | 200 | Gainesville, FL | Redshirt Freshman | Arizona State | |
| Amari Jefferson | 17 | WR | 6'1" | 190 | Chattanooga, TN | Freshman | Tennessee | |
| JR Gardner | 41 | RB | 5'11" | 185 | Gulf Shores, AL | Sophomore | Alabama State (FCS) | |
| Braylon Chatman | 52 | LB | 6'0" | 200 | Trussville, AL | Sophomore | TBA | |
| Jayshawn Ross | 43 | LB | 6'4" | 220 | Kansas City, MO | Freshman | Kansas State | |
| Jeremiah Alexander | 35 | LB | 6'2" | 249 | Alabaster, AL | Redshirt Freshman | Clemson | |
| King Mack | 9 | DB | 5'10" | 188 | Miami, FL | Sophomore | Penn State | |
| Ty Lockwood | 88 | TE | 6'5" | 234 | Thompson's Station, TN | Redshirt Freshman | Boston College | |
| Sterling Dixon | 40 | LB | 6'3" | 211 | Spanish Fort, AL | Freshman | NC State | |
| Elijah Pritchett | 57 | OL | 6'6" | 322 | Columbus, GA | Redshirt Sophomore | Nebraska | |
| Justin Okoronkwo | 41 | LB | 6'3" | 211 | Nurëmberg, GER | Freshman | South Carolina | |

Note: Players with a dash in the new school column didn't land on a new team for the 2024 season.

==== Coaching staff departures ====
| Name | Position | New Team | New Position | Source |
|---|---|---|---|---|
| Colin Hitschler | Co-defensive coordinator/Defensive backs coach | Not Retained - Accepted job at James Madison | Defensive coordinator | AthlonSports.com |

=== Entered NFL draft ===
The deadline for players to declare for the NFL draft was January 15, 2025.

Seven Alabama players were drafted in 2025.

During the first round of the draft that April, guard Tyler Booker was the Dallas Cowboys's 12th pick; linebacker Jihaad Campbell (#31) was selected by Philadelphia Eagles (traded from Kansas City Chiefs). In the third round, quarterback Jalen Milroe (#92) was picked by the Seattle Seahawks; in the fourth round, safety Malachi Moore (#130) selected by the New York Jets; linebacker Que Robinson (#134) selected by the Denver Broncos; in the fifth round, tight end Robbie Ouzts (#175) was chosen by the Seattle Seahawks and the sixth round, defensive tackle Tim Smith (#190) was selected by the Indianapolis Colts.

| Player | Position | Round | Pick | Drafted by |
|---|---|---|---|---|
| Tyler Booker | OL | 1 | 12 | Dallas Cowboys |
| Jihaad Campbell | LB | 1 | 31 | Philadelphia Eagles |
| Jalen Milroe | QB | 3 | 92 | Seattle Seahawks |
| Malachi Moore | WR | 4 | 130 | New York Jets |
| Que Robinson | LB | 4 | 134 | Denver Broncos |
| Robbie Ouzts | FB | 5 | 175 | Seattle Seahawks |
| Tim Smith | DT | 6 | 190 | Indianapolis Colts |

=== Acquisitions ===
==== Incoming transfers ====
Over the off-season, Alabama added twelve players from the transfer portal. According to 247 Sports, Alabama had the No. 22 ranked transfer class in the country.

| Name | Pos. | Height | Weight | Hometown | Year | Eligibility Remaining | Prev school | Source |
|---|---|---|---|---|---|---|---|---|
| Cameron Calhoun | CB | 6'0" | 177 | Cincinnati, OH | Freshman | 3 | Utah | |
| Isaiah Horton | WR | 6'4" | 205 | Murfreesboro, TN | Redshirt Sophomore | 2 | Miami | |
| Kam Dewberry | OL | 6'4" | 330 | Humble, TX | Junior | 1 | Texas A&M | |
| Kelby Collins | EDGE | 6'4" | 278 | Gardendale, AL | Sophomore | 2 | Florida | |
| Nikhai Hill-Green | LB | 6'2" | 230 | Baltimore, MD | Senior | 1 | Colorado | |
| David Bird | LS | 6'0" | 210 | Phoenix, AZ | Sophomore | 2 | California | |
| Blake Doud | P | 6'5" | 215 | Parker, CO | RS Junior | 1 | Colorado Mines (Division II) | |
| Arkel Anugwom | OL | 6'6" | 332 | Antioch, TN | Sophomore | 2 | Ball State | |
| Peter Knudson | TE | 6'4" | 240 | McCall, ID | Junior | 1 | Weber State (walk-on) | |
| Dre’lyn Washington | RB | 5'9" | 224 | Hemphill, TX | Junior | 1 | Louisiana | |
| Jayden Hobson | OL | 6'5" | 295 | Tuscaloosa, AL | Freshman | 4 | South Alabama | |
| Brody Dalton | TE | 6'5" | 250 | Fyffe, AL | Junior | 1 | Troy | |

==== 2025 recruits ====
The following recruits and transfers have signed letters of intent or verbally committed to the Alabama Crimson Tide football program for the 2025 recruiting year.

College recruiting
| Name | Hometown | School | Height | Weight | Commit date |
|---|---|---|---|---|---|
| Keelon Russell; Quarterback | Duncanville, TX | Duncanville High School | 6 ft 3 in (1.91 m) | 195 lb (88 kg) | Jun 4, 2024 |
| Keelon Russell; Quarterback | Recruit ratings: Rivals: 247Sports: ESPN: (90) | | | | |
| Dijon Lee Jr. Cornerback | Mission Viejo, CA | Mission Viejo High School | 6 ft 4 in (1.93 m) | 190 lb (86 kg) | Jun 28, 2024 |
| Dijon Lee Jr. Cornerback | Recruit ratings: Rivals: 247Sports: ESPN: (86) | | | | |
| Akylin Dear; Running back | Quitman, MS | Quitman High School | 6 ft 0 in (1.83 m) | 205 lb (93 kg) | Aug 20, 2024 |
| Akylin Dear; Running back | Recruit ratings: Rivals: 247Sports: ESPN: (86) | | | | |
| Darrell Johnson; Outside linebacker | Eastman, GA | Dodge County High School | 6 ft 2 in (1.88 m) | 205 lb (93 kg) | Mar 20, 2024 |
| Darrell Johnson; Outside linebacker | Recruit ratings: Rivals: 247Sports: ESPN: (85) | | | | |
| Ivan Taylor; Cornerback | Winter Garden, FL | West Orange High School | 6 ft 0 in (1.83 m) | 175 lb (79 kg) | Nov 18, 2024 |
| Ivan Taylor; Cornerback | Recruit ratings: Rivals: 247Sports: ESPN: (85) | | | | |
| Justin Hill; Outside linebacker | Cincinnati, OH | Winton Woods High School | 6 ft 3 in (1.91 m) | 220 lb (100 kg) | Jul 3, 2024 |
| Justin Hill; Outside linebacker | Recruit ratings: Rivals: 247Sports: ESPN: (84) | | | | |
| Michael Carroll; Offensive guard | Doylestown, PA | IMG Academy (FL) | 6 ft 5 in (1.96 m) | 290 lb (130 kg) | Jun 10, 2024 |
| Michael Carroll; Offensive guard | Recruit ratings: Rivals: 247Sports: On3: ESPN: (84) | | | | |
| Micah Debose; Offensive tackle | Prichard, AL | Vigor High School | 6 ft 5 in (1.96 m) | 330 lb (150 kg) | Jun 22, 2024 |
| Micah Debose; Offensive tackle | Recruit ratings: Rivals: 247Sports: ESPN: (83) | | | | |
| Jackson Lloyd; Offensive tackle | Carmel, CA | Carmel High School | 6 ft 6 in (1.98 m) | 295 lb (134 kg) | Jun 18, 2024 |
| Jackson Lloyd; Offensive tackle | Recruit ratings: Rivals: 247Sports: ESPN: (83) | | | | |
| Chuck McDonald II; Cornerback | Santa Ana, CA | Mater Dei High School | 6 ft 0 in (1.83 m) | 185 lb (84 kg) | Jun 8, 2024 |
| Chuck McDonald II; Cornerback | Recruit ratings: Rivals: 247Sports: ESPN: (83) | | | | |
| Lotzeir Brooks; Wide receiver | Millville, NJ | Millville High School | 5 ft 9 in (1.75 m) | 180 lb (82 kg) | Apr 13, 2024 |
| Lotzeir Brooks; Wide receiver | Recruit ratings: Rivals: 247Sports: ESPN: (83) | | | | |
| Abduall Sanders Jr. Inside linebacker | Santa Ana, CA | Mater Dei High School | 6 ft 2 in (1.88 m) | 210 lb (95 kg) | Mar 21, 2024 |
| Abduall Sanders Jr. Inside linebacker | Recruit ratings: Rivals: 247Sports: ESPN: (82) | | | | |
| Derek Meadows; Wide receiver | Las Vegas, NV | Bishop Gorman High School | 6 ft 7 in (2.01 m) | 205 lb (93 kg) | Dec 4, 2024 |
| Derek Meadows; Wide receiver | Recruit ratings: Rivals: 247Sports: ESPN: (82) | | | | |
| Kaleb Edwards; Tight end | El Dorado Hills, CA | Oak Ridge High School | 6 ft 6 in (1.98 m) | 220 lb (100 kg) | Jun 18, 2024 |
| Kaleb Edwards; Tight end | Recruit ratings: Rivals: 247Sports: On3: ESPN: (81) | | | | |
| Steve Bolo Mboumoua; Defensive end | Saint-Augustin-de-Desmaures, Quebec, CN | Southwest Mississippi Community College (JC) | 6 ft 4 in (1.93 m) | 285 lb (129 kg) | Jul 10, 2024 |
| Steve Bolo Mboumoua; Defensive end | Recruit ratings: Rivals: 247Sports: ESPN: (81) | | | | |
| Kevonte Henry; Defensive end | Los Angeles, CA | Cerritos College (JC) | 6 ft 4 in (1.93 m) | 220 lb (100 kg) | Oct 14, 2024 |
| Kevonte Henry; Defensive end | Recruit ratings: Rivals: 247Sports: ESPN: (81) | | | | |
| Mal Waldrep; Offensive tackle | Phenix City, AL | Central High School | 6 ft 5 in (1.96 m) | 280 lb (130 kg) | Jun 11, 2024 |
| Mal Waldrep; Offensive tackle | Recruit ratings: Rivals: 247Sports: On3: ESPN: (79) | | | | |
| Luke Metz; Inside linebacker | Hoschton, GA | Mill Creek High School | 6 ft 3 in (1.91 m) | 210 lb (95 kg) | Mar 24, 2024 |
| Luke Metz; Inside linebacker | Recruit ratings: Rivals: 247Sports: On3: ESPN: (79) | | | | |
| Marshall Pritchett; Tight end | Rabun Gap, GA | Rabun Gap-Nacoochee School | 6 ft 5 in (1.96 m) | 215 lb (98 kg) | Oct 22, 2024 |
| Marshall Pritchett; Tight end | Recruit ratings: Rivals: 247Sports: ESPN: (79) | | | | |
| London Simmons; Defensive tackle | Flowood, MS | Hartfield Academy | 6 ft 3 in (1.91 m) | 305 lb (138 kg) | Jun 16, 2024 |
| London Simmons; Defensive tackle | Recruit ratings: Rivals: 247Sports: On3: ESPN: (79) | | | | |
| Alex Asparuhov; Kicker | Fresno, CA | San Joaquin Memorial High School | 6 ft 3 in (1.91 m) | 190 lb (86 kg) | Jun 15, 2024 |
| Alex Asparuhov; Kicker | Recruit ratings: Rivals: 247Sports: On3: ESPN: (75) | | | | |
Overall recruit ranking: Rivals: 3 247Sports: 2 On3: 2
‡ Refers to 40-yard dash; Note: In many cases, Scout, Rivals, 247Sports, On3, and ESPN may conflict in their listings of height, weight and 40 time.; In these cases, the average was taken. ESPN grades are on a 100-point scale.; Sources: "Alabama Football Commitment List". Rivals.; "2025 Player commitments - Alabama". ESPN.; "2025 Team Ranking". Rivals.com.; "Alabama Football 2025 commits". 247Sports.

*= 247Sports Composite rating; ratings are out of 1.00. (five stars= 1.00–.98, four stars= .97–.90, three stars= .80–.89)
†= Despite being rated as a four and five star recruit by ESPN, On3.com, Rivals.com and 247Sports.com, Williams and Whittington received a four star 247Sports Composite rating.
Δ= TBD left the Alabama program following signing but prior to the 2025 season.

2025 Overall class rankings

| Website | National rank | Conference rank | 5 star recruits | 4 star recruits | 3 star recruits | Total |
|---|---|---|---|---|---|---|
| ESPN | -- | -- | 0 | 19 | 3 | 22 |
| On3 Recruits | #2 | #1 | 3 | 14 | 4 | 22 |
| Rivals | #3 | #1 | 0 | 18 | 2 | 20 |
| 247 Sports | #2 | #2 | 4 | 14 | 2 | 21 |

==== 2026 recruits ====
The following recruits and transfers have signed letters of intent or verbally committed to the Alabama Crimson Tide football program for the 2026 recruiting year.

College recruiting (2026)
| Name | Hometown | School | Height | Weight | Commit date |
|---|---|---|---|---|---|
| Jireh Edwards #1 Safety | Baltimore, MD | St. Frances Academy | 6 ft 2 in (1.88 m) | 210 lb (95 kg) | Jul 5, 2025 |
| Jireh Edwards #1 Safety | Recruit ratings: 247Sports: On3: ESPN: (90) | | | | |
| Ezavier Crowell* #3 Running back | Jackson, AL | Jackson High School | 5 ft 11 in (1.80 m) | 210 lb (95 kg) | Jun 26, 2025 |
| Ezavier Crowell* #3 Running back | Recruit ratings: 247Sports: On3: ESPN: (90) | | | | |
| Xavier Griffin #3 Outside linebacker | Cullman, AL | Gainesville HS (GA) | 6 ft 4 in (1.93 m) | 205 lb (93 kg) | Jun 29, 2025 |
| Xavier Griffin #3 Outside linebacker | Recruit ratings: 247Sports: On3: ESPN: (89) | | | | |
| Jorden Edmonds #3 Cornerback | Marietta, GA | Sprayberry High School | 6 ft 0 in (1.83 m) | 205 lb (93 kg) | Mar 26, 2025 |
| Jorden Edmonds #3 Cornerback | Recruit ratings: 247Sports: On3: ESPN: (86) | | | | |
| Cederian Morgan #5 Wide receiver | Alexander City, AL | Benjamin Russell High School | 6 ft 4 in (1.93 m) | 210 lb (95 kg) | Jul 2, 2025 |
| Cederian Morgan #5 Wide receiver | Recruit ratings: 247Sports: On3: ESPN: (86) | | | | |
| Nolan Wilson #7 Defensive end | Picayune, MS | Picayune Memorial High School | 6 ft 5 in (1.96 m) | 250 lb (110 kg) | Jul 4, 2025 |
| Nolan Wilson #7 Defensive end | Recruit ratings: 247Sports: On3: ESPN: (84) | | | | |
| Zyan Gibson #8 Cornerback | Gadsden, AL | Gadsden High School | 6 ft 0 in (1.83 m) | 175 lb (79 kg) | Dec 25, 2024 |
| Zyan Gibson #8 Cornerback | Recruit ratings: 247Sports: On3: ESPN: (84) | | | | |
| Jamarion Matthews #12 Defensive end | Gainesville, GA | Gainesville High School | 6 ft 3 in (1.91 m) | 255 lb (116 kg) | Feb 21, 2025 |
| Jamarion Matthews #12 Defensive end | Recruit ratings: 247Sports: On3: ESPN: (83) | | | | |
| Jett Thomalla #5 Quarterback | Omaha, NE | Millard South High School | 6 ft 4 in (1.93 m) | 200 lb (91 kg) | Jun 17, 2025 |
| Jett Thomalla #5 Quarterback | Recruit ratings: 247Sports: On3: ESPN: (83) | | | | |
| Mack Sutter #5 Tight end | Dunlap, IL | Dunlap High School | 6 ft 5 in (1.96 m) | 220 lb (100 kg) | Jun 26, 2025 |
| Mack Sutter #5 Tight end | Recruit ratings: 247Sports: On3: ESPN: (82) | | | | |
| Kamhariyan Johnson; Defensive end | Muscle Shoals, AL | Muscle Shoals High School | 6 ft 3 in (1.91 m) | 260 lb (120 kg) | Apr 12, 2025 |
| Kamhariyan Johnson; Defensive end | Recruit ratings: 247Sports: On3: ESPN: (80) | | | | |
| Chris Booker; Offensive guard | Atlanta, GA | Hapeville Charter High School | 6 ft 4 in (1.93 m) | 280 lb (130 kg) | Feb 20, 2025 |
| Chris Booker; Offensive guard | Recruit ratings: 247Sports: On3: ESPN: (79) | | | | |
| Rihyael Kelley; Safety | Cincinnati, OH | Winton Woods High School | 6 ft 3 in (1.91 m) | 180 lb (82 kg) | Jun 23, 2025 |
| Rihyael Kelley; Safety | Recruit ratings: 247Sports: On3: ESPN: (79) | | | | |
| Malique Franklin; Defensive end | Daphne, AL | Daphne High School | 6 ft 5 in (1.96 m) | 250 lb (110 kg) | Dec 2, 2025 |
| Malique Franklin; Defensive end | Recruit ratings: 247Sports: On3: ESPN: (79) | | | | |
| Corey Howard; Defensive end | Valdosta, GA | Valdosta High School | 6 ft 6 in (1.98 m) | 230 lb (100 kg) | Oct 19, 2025 |
| Corey Howard; Defensive end | Recruit ratings: 247Sports: On3: ESPN: (79) | | | | |
| Bryson Cooley; Offensive guard | Laurel, MS | West Jones High School | 6 ft 6 in (1.98 m) | 320 lb (150 kg) | Jun 11, 2024 |
| Bryson Cooley; Offensive guard | Recruit ratings: 247Sports: On3: ESPN: (79) | | | | |
| Tayden-Evan Kaawa; Quarterback | East Orem, UT | Orem High School | N/A | 235 lb (107 kg) | Jul 2, 2025 |
| Tayden-Evan Kaawa; Quarterback | Recruit ratings: 247Sports: On3: ESPN: (78) | | | | |
| Jared Doughty; Offensive tackle | College Park, GA | Benjamin E. Banneker High School | 6 ft 5 in (1.96 m) | 270 lb (120 kg) | Oct 5, 2025 |
| Jared Doughty; Offensive tackle | Recruit ratings: 247Sports: On3: ESPN: (78) | | | | |
| Treshawn Brown; Running back | Huntsville, TX | Huntsville HS | 5 ft 9 in (1.75 m) | 190 lb (86 kg) | Dec 4, 2025 |
| Treshawn Brown; Running back | Recruit ratings: 247Sports: On3: ESPN: (77) | | | | |
| Tyrell Miller #1 Offensive guard | Newark, CA | College of San Mateo (JC) | 6 ft 5 in (1.96 m) | 305 lb (138 kg) | Nov 29, 2025 |
| Tyrell Miller #1 Offensive guard | Recruit ratings: 247Sports: On3: ESPN: (77) | | | | |
| Amari Sabb; Athlete | Glassboro, NJ | Glassboro High School | 5 ft 9 in (1.75 m) | 165 lb (75 kg) | Feb 3, 2026 |
| Amari Sabb; Athlete | Recruit ratings: 247Sports: On3: ESPN: (76) | | | | |
| Bear Fretwell; Offensive tackle | Brooklet, GA | Southeast Bulloch High School | 6 ft 6 in (1.98 m) | 290 lb (130 kg) | Jul 25, 2025 |
| Bear Fretwell; Offensive tackle | Recruit ratings: 247Sports: On3: ESPN: (76) | | | | |
| Nick Sherman #6 Cornerback | Tuscaloosa, AL | Itawamba Community College (JC) | 6 ft 1 in (1.85 m) | 200 lb (91 kg) | Dec 14, 2025 |
| Nick Sherman #6 Cornerback | Recruit ratings: 247Sports: On3: ESPN: (76) | | | | |
| Zay Hall; Inside linebacker | Tuscaloosa, AL | Hillcrest HS | 6 ft 2 in (1.88 m) | 225 lb (102 kg) | Jun 27, 2025 |
| Zay Hall; Inside linebacker | Recruit ratings: 247Sports: On3: ESPN: (76) | | | | |
| Tyler Henderson; Wide receiver | Vicksburg, MS | Mississippi Gulf Coast CC (JC) | 6 ft 0 in (1.83 m) | 175 lb (79 kg) | Feb 14, 2026 |
| Tyler Henderson; Wide receiver | Recruit ratings: 247Sports: On3: ESPN: (76) | | | | |
| Eli Deutsch #12 Long snapper | Franklin, WI | Franklin HS | 6 ft 2 in (1.88 m) | 225 lb (102 kg) | Jun 24, 2025 |
| Eli Deutsch #12 Long snapper | Recruit ratings: ESPN: (68) | | | | |
| Maurice Mathis Jr. Wide receiver | Warner Robins, GA | Houston County HS | 6 ft 1 in (1.85 m) | 180 lb (82 kg) | Jan 17, 2026 |
| Maurice Mathis Jr. Wide receiver | Recruit ratings: 247Sports: | | | | |
| Aubrey Walker; Athlete | Moody, AL | Moody High School | 5 ft 10 in (1.78 m) | 165 lb (75 kg) | Jan 22, 2026 |
| Aubrey Walker; Athlete | Recruit ratings: 247Sports: | | | | |
| George French; Defensive back | Birmingham, AL | Homewood High School | 6 ft 1 in (1.85 m) | 180 lb (82 kg) | Feb 18, 2026 |
| George French; Defensive back | Recruit ratings: 247Sports: | | | | |
| Jude Cascone; Tight end | Marietta, GA | Walton High School | 6 ft 2 in (1.88 m) | 225 lb (102 kg) | Nov 30, 2025 |
| Jude Cascone; Tight end | Recruit ratings: 247Sports: | | | | |
Overall recruit ranking: 247Sports: 2 On3: 4
‡ Refers to 40-yard dash; Note: In many cases, Scout, Rivals, 247Sports, On3, and ESPN may conflict in their listings of height, weight and 40 time.; In these cases, the average was taken. ESPN grades are on a 100-point scale.; Sources: "2026 Player commitments - Alabama". ESPN.; "2026 Team Ranking". Rivals.com.; "Alabama Football 2026 commits". 247Sports.; "2026 Alabama Football recruits". On3.

*Originally class of 2027, but reclassified to 2026.

*= 247Sports Composite rating; ratings are out of 1.00. (five stars= 1.00–.98, four stars= .97–.90, three stars= .80–.89)
†= Despite being rated as a four and five star recruit by ESPN, On3.com, Rivals.com and 247Sports.com, TBD and TBD received a four star 247Sports Composite rating.
Δ= TBD left the Alabama program following signing but prior to the 2026 season.

2026 Overall class rankings

| Website | National rank | Conference rank | 5 star recruits | 4 star recruits | 3 star recruits | Total |
|---|---|---|---|---|---|---|
| ESPN | -- | -- | 1 | 10 | 11 | 23 |
| On3 Recruits | #4 | #1 | 3 | 11 | 8 | 22 |
| Rivals | #4 | #1 | 3 | 11 | 8 | 22 |
| 247 Sports | #2 | #2 | 4 | 10 | 8 | 22 |

==== Walk-ons ====
| Name | Pos. | Height | Weight | Hometown | High school |
|---|---|---|---|---|---|
| Kyle Clayton | DB | 6'0 | 190 | - | - |
| London Hill | DB | 5'11 | 180 | - | - |
| Jessie Washington | RB | 5'9 | 205 | - | - |
| Grant Johnson | LB | 6'0 | 220 | - | - |
| Jamison Travis | OL | 6'2 | 305 | - | - |

==== Coaching staff additions ====
| Name | New Position | Previous Team | Previous Position | Source |
|---|---|---|---|---|
| Jason Jones | DB | North Carolina | DB | al.com |
| Ryan Grubb | OC | Seattle Seahawks (NFL) | OC | al.com |

== Preseason ==
=== Spring game ===
The Crimson Tide are scheduled to hold spring practices in March and April 2025 with the Alabama football spring game, "A-Day" to take place in Tuscaloosa, Alabama, on April 13, 2025.

=== SEC media days ===
SEC media poll
| Predicted finish | Team | Votes (1st place) |
| 1 | Texas | 3060 (96) |
| 2 | Georgia | 2957 (44) |
| 3 | Alabama | 2783 (29) |
| 4 | LSU | 2668 (20) |
| 5 | South Carolina | 2109 (5) |
| 6 | Florida | 1986 (2) |
| 7 | Ole Miss | 1979 (1) |
| 8 | Texas A&M | 1892 |
| 9 | Tennessee | 1700 (1) |
| 10 | Oklahoma | 1613 (3) |
| 11 | Auburn | 1272 (1) |
| 12 | Missouri | 1170 |
| 13 | Vanderbilt | 936 (2) |
| 14 | Arkansas | 764 |
| 15 | Kentucky | 512 |
| 16 | Mississippi State | 343 |

Media poll (SEC Championship)
| 1 | Texas | 96 |
| 2 | Georgia | 44 |
| 3 | Alabama | 29 |
| 4 | LSU | 20 |
| 5 | South Carolina | 5 |
| 6 | Oklahoma | 3 |
| 7 | Florida | 2 |
| 7 | Vanderbilt | 2 |
| 8 | Ole Miss | 1 |
| 8 | Tennessee | 1 |
| 8 | Auburn | 1 |

=== Preseason SEC awards ===
2025 Preseason All-SEC teams

==== Media ====
First Team

| Position | Player | Class |
|---|---|---|
Offense
| WR | Ryan Coleman-Williams | So. |
| OL | Kadyn Proctor | Jr. |

Second Team

| Position | Player | Class |
|---|---|---|
Offense
| OL | Jaeden Roberts | RS-Senior |
| OL | Parker Brailsford | RS-Junior |
Defense
| DL | Tim Keenan III | RS-Senior |
| DL | LT Overton | Sr. |
| DB | Domani Jackson | Sr. |
| LB | Deontae Lawson | RS Sr. |

Third Team

| Position | Player | Class |
|---|---|---|
Offense
| RB | Jam Miller | Sr. |
Defense
| DB | Bray Hubbard | Jr. |
| DB | Keon Sabb | RS-Junior |

==== Coaches ====
First Team

| Position | Player | Class |
|---|---|---|
Offense
| WR | Ryan Coleman-Williams | So. |
| OL | Kadyn Proctor | Jr. |

Second Team

| Position | Player | Class |
|---|---|---|
Offense
| OL | Jaeden Roberts | RS-Jr. |
| OL | Parker Brailsford | RS-Jr. |
Defense
| DL | Tim Keenan III | RS. Sr. |
| DL | LT Overton | Sr. |
| DB | Domani Jackson | Sr. |
| DB | Keon Sabb | RS-Jr. |
| LB | Deontae Lawson | RS Sr. |

Third Team

| Position | Player | Class |
|---|---|---|
Offense
| RB | Jam Miller | Sr. |
Defense
| DB | Bray Hubbard | Jr. |

=== Award watch lists ===
Listed in the order that they were released

| Award | Player | Position | Year | Source |
|---|---|---|---|---|
| Lott Trophy | Deontae Lawson | LB | R-Sr. | |
| Lott Trophy | LT Overton | DL | Sr. | |
| Dodd Trophy | Kalen DeBoer | HC | – | |
| Maxwell Award | Ryan Coleman-Williams | WR | So. | |
| Outland Trophy | Parker Brailsford | OL | R-Jr. | |
| Outland Trophy | Kadyn Proctor | OL | Jr. | |
| Outland Trophy | Jaeden Roberts | OL | R-Sr. | |
| Bronko Nagurski Trophy | Deontae Lawson | LB | R-Sr. | |
| Bronko Nagurski Trophy | LT Overton | DL | Sr. | |
| Bronko Nagurski Trophy | Tim Keenan III | DL | R-Sr. | |
| Butkus Award | Deontae Lawson | LB | R-Sr. | |
| Butkus Award | Justin Jefferson | LB | Sr. | |
| Paul Hornung Award | Ryan Coleman-Williams | WR | So. | |
| Wuerffel Trophy | LT Overton | DL | Sr. | |
| Patrick Mannelly Award | David Bird | LS | Jr. | |
| Walter Camp Award | Ryan Coleman-Williams | WR | So. | |
| Doak Walker Award | Jam Miller | RB | Sr. | |
| Biletnikoff Award | Germie Bernard | WR | Sr. | |
| Biletnikoff Award | Ryan Coleman-Williams | WR | So. | |
| John Mackey Award | Josh Cuevas | TE | Sr. | |
| Rimington Trophy | Parker Brailsford | OL | R-Jr. | |
| Bednarik Award | Deontae Lawson | LB | R-Sr. | |
| Bednarik Award | Tim Keenan III | DL | R-Sr. | |
| Rotary Lombardi Award | Deontae Lawson | LB | R-Sr. | |
| Rotary Lombardi Award | Tim Keenan III | DL | R-Sr. | |
| Rotary Lombardi Award | Kadyn Proctor | OL | Jr. | |
| Rotary Lombardi Award | Parker Brailsford | OL | R-Jr. | |
| Comeback Player of the Year Award | Deontae Lawson | LB | R-Sr. | |
| Comeback Player of the Year Award | Keon Sabb | DB | R-Jr. | |
| Johnny Unitas Golden Arm Award | Ty Simpson | QB | R-Jr. | |
| Earl Campbell Tyler Rose Award | Jam Miller | RB | Sr. | |
| Shaun Alexander Freshman of the Year Award | Dijon Lee Jr. | CB | Fr. | |
| Shaun Alexander Freshman of the Year Award | Michael Carroll | OL | Fr. | |

=== Preseason All-Americans ===
Preseason All-American Honors
| Player | Position | Class | Designation | AP | Athlon | CBS Sports | CFN | ESPN | PFF | SI | SN | USA Today | WCFF |
|---|---|---|---|---|---|---|---|---|---|---|---|---|---|
| Parker Brailsford | OL | RS-Junior | 1st team offense | – | – | – | – | – | – | ✓ | – | – | – |
| Kadyn Proctor; Unanimous | OL | Junior | 1st team offense | ✓ | ✓ | – | ✓ | ✓ | ✓ | ✓ | – | ✓ | ✓ |
| Ryan Coleman-Williams; Unanimous | WR | Sophomore | 1st team offense | ✓ | ✓ | ✓ | ✓ | ✓ | ✓ | – | ✓ | ✓ | ✓ |
| Tim Keenan III | DB | RS-Senior | 1st team defense | – | – | – | – | ✓ | – | – | ✓ | – | – |
| Deontae Lawson | LB | RS-Senior | 1st team defense | – | – | – | ✓ | – | – | – | – | – | – |
| LT Overton | DL | Senior | 1st team defense | – | – | ✓ | – | ✓ | – | – | – | – | – |

Other All-Americans teams
| Player | Position | Class | Selector(s) |
| Deontae Lawson | Linebacker | Senior | 1st Team Defense (Phil Steele); 2nd Team Defense (ESPN, SI); 3rd Team Defense (Athlon Sports) |
| Jaeden Roberts | Offensive lineman | RS-Senior | 3rd Team Offense (Phil Steele); 2nd Team Offense (Sporting News, CBS Sports) |
| Kadyn Proctor | Offensive lineman | Junior | 1st Team Offense (Phil Steele); 2nd Team Offense (Sporting News, CBS Sports) |
| Parker Brailsford | Offensive lineman | RS-Junior | 1st Team Offense (Phil Steele); 2nd Team Offense (AP); Honorable Mention (CFN) |
| Ryan Coleman-Williams | WR | Sophomore | 1st Team Offense (Phil Steele); 2nd Team Offense (SI) |
| Tim Keenan III | DB | RS-Senior | 1st Team Offense (Phil Steele); 2nd Team Offense (WCFF, AP, USA Today, SI); Honorable Mention (CFN) |
| LT Overton | DB | Senior | Honorable Mention (CFN) |

== Schedule ==
| Date | Time | Opponent | Rank | Site | TV | Result | Attendance |
|---|---|---|---|---|---|---|---|
| August 30 | 2:30 p.m. | at Florida State* | No. 8 | Doak Campbell Stadium; Tallahassee, FL | ABC | L 17–31 | 67,277 |
| September 6 | 6:45 p.m. | Louisiana–Monroe* | No. 21 | Bryant–Denny Stadium; Tuscaloosa, AL | SECN | W 73–0 | 100,077 |
| September 13 | 11:00 a.m. | Wisconsin* | No. 19 | Bryant–Denny Stadium; Tuscaloosa, AL | ABC | W 38–14 | 100,077 |
| September 27 | 6:30 p.m. | at No. 5 Georgia | No. 17 | Sanford Stadium; Athens, GA (rivalry, SEC Nation) | ABC/SECN | W 24–21 | 93,033 |
| October 4 | 2:30 p.m. | No. 16 Vanderbilt | No. 10 | Bryant–Denny Stadium; Tuscaloosa, AL (College GameDay) | ABC | W 30–14 | 100,077 |
| October 11 | 11:00 a.m. | at No. 14 Missouri | No. 8 | Faurot Field; Columbia, MO (SEC Nation) | ABC | W 27–24 | 57,321 |
| October 18 | 6:30 p.m. | No. 11 Tennessee | No. 6 | Bryant–Denny Stadium; Tuscaloosa, AL (Third Saturday in October) | ABC | W 37–20 | 100,077 |
| October 25 | 2:30 p.m. | at South Carolina | No. 4 | Williams–Brice Stadium; Columbia, SC | ABC | W 29–22 | 79,537 |
| November 8 | 6:30 p.m. | LSU | No. 4 | Bryant–Denny Stadium; Tuscaloosa, AL (rivalry) | ABC | W 20–9 | 100,077 |
| November 15 | 2:30 p.m. | No. 11 Oklahoma^{†} | No. 4 | Bryant–Denny Stadium; Tuscaloosa, AL | ABC | L 21–23 | 100,077 |
| November 22 | 1:00 p.m. | Eastern Illinois* | No. 10 | Bryant–Denny Stadium; Tuscaloosa, AL | SECN+/ESPN+ | W 56–0 | 100,077 |
| November 29 | 6:30 p.m. | at Auburn | No. 10 | Jordan–Hare Stadium; Auburn, AL (Iron Bowl) | ABC/SECN | W 27–20 | 88,043 |
| December 6 | 3:00 p.m. | vs. No. 3 Georgia | No. 9 | Mercedes-Benz Stadium; Atlanta, GA (SEC Championship Game, rivalry, College Gameday, SEC Nation) | ABC/ESPN | L 7–28 | 77,247 |
| December 19 | 7:00 p.m. | at (8) No. 8 Oklahoma* | (9) No. 9 | Gaylord Family Oklahoma Memorial Stadium; Norman, OK (CFP First Round, College GameDay) | ABC/ESPN | W 34–24 | 83,550 |
| January 1, 2026 | 3:00 p.m. | vs. (1) No. 1 Indiana* | (9) No. 9 | Rose Bowl; Pasadena, CA (Rose Bowl–CFP Quarterfinal, College GameDay) | ESPN | L 3–38 | 90,278 |
*Non-conference game; ^{†}Homecoming; Rankings from AP Poll (and CFP Rankings, after November 4) - Released prior to game; All times are in Central time

== Rankings ==
Ranking movements Legend: ██ Increase in ranking ██ Decrease in ranking
| | Week | | | | | | | | | | | | | | | | |
| Poll | Pre | 1 | 2 | 3 | 4 | 5 | 6 | 7 | 8 | 9 | 10 | 11 | 12 | 13 | 14 | 15 | Final |
|---|---|---|---|---|---|---|---|---|---|---|---|---|---|---|---|---|---|
| AP | 8 | 21 | 19 | 14 | 17 | 10 | 8 | 6 | 4 | 4 | 4 | 4 | 10 | 10 | 10 | 11 | 9 |
| Coaches | 8 | 20 | 18 | 14 | 16 | 11 | 8 | 6 | 4 | 4 | 4 | 4 | 10 | 10 | 10 | 11 | 9 |
| CFP | Not released | | | | | | | | | | 4 | 4 | 10 | 10 | 9 | 9 | Not released |

== Game summaries ==
=== at Florida State ===
No. 8 Alabama Crimson Tide (0–0) at Florida State Seminoles (0–0) – Game summary

| Quarter | 1 | 2 | 3 | 4 | Total |
|---|---|---|---|---|---|
| No. 8 Crimson Tide | 7 | 0 | 3 | 7 | 17 |
| Seminoles | 7 | 10 | 7 | 7 | 31 |

at Doak Campbell Stadium • Tallahassee, FL

- Date: August 30
- Game time: 2:30 p.m. CDT
- Game weather: 87°F, Cloudy, Wind N @ 6 mph
- Game attendance: 67,277
- Referee: Mike Roche
- TV announcers (ABC): Joe Tessitore (play-by-play), Jesse Palmer (analyst), and Katie George (sideline)

Game information

First quarter

- (6:10) ALA – Josh Cuevas 2-yard pass from Ty Simpson, Conor Talty kick (Drive: 16 plays, 75 yards, 8:50; Alabama 7–0)
- (3:04) FSU – Tommy Castellanos 9-yard run, Jake Weinberg kick (Drive: 7 plays, 75 yards, 3:06; Tied 7–7)

Second quarter

- (9:13) FSU – Micahi Danzy 32-yard run, Jake Weinberg kick (Drive: 8 plays, 65 yards, 3:59; Florida State 14–7)
- (3:44) FSU – Jake Weinberg 45-yard field goal (Drive: 9 plays, 52 yards, 4:39; Florida State 17–7)

Third quarter

- (9:45) FSU – Caziah Holmes 4-yard run, Jake Weinberg kick (Drive: 2 plays, 68 yards, 0:37; Florida State 24–7)
- (5:59) ALA – Conor Talty 40-yard field goal (Drive: 12 plays, 53 yards, 3:46; Florida State 24–10)

Fourth quarter

- (11:00) ALA – Rico Scott 6-yard pass from Ty Simpson, Conor Talty kick (Drive: 7 plays, 63 yards, 3:16; Florida State 24–17)
- (7:17) FSU – Gavin Sawchuk 14-yard run, Jake Weinberg kick (Drive: 10 plays, 75 yards, 3:43; Florida State 31–17)

| Statistics | ALA | FSU |
|---|---|---|
| First downs | 18 | 20 |
| Plays–yards | 72–341 | 63–382 |
| Rushes–yards | 29–87 | 49–230 |
| Passing yards | 254 | 152 |
| Passing: comp–att–int | 23–43–0 | 9–14–0 |
| Turnovers | 0 | 1 |
| Time of possession | 29:38 | 30:22 |

| Team | Category | Player | Statistics |
|---|---|---|---|
| Alabama | Passing | Ty Simpson | 23/43, 254 yards, 2 TD |
| Alabama | Rushing | Kevin Riley | 5 carries, 31 yards |
| Alabama | Receiving | Germie Bernard | 8 receptions, 146 yards |
| Florida State | Passing | Tommy Castellanos | 9/14, 152 yards |
| Florida State | Rushing | Tommy Castellanos | 16 carries, 78 yards, TD |
| Florida State | Receiving | Jaylin Lucas | 2 receptions, 66 yards |

=== vs Louisiana–Monroe ===
Louisiana–Monroe Warhawks (1–0) at No. 21 Alabama Crimson Tide (0–1) – Game summary

| Quarter | 1 | 2 | 3 | 4 | Total |
|---|---|---|---|---|---|
| Warhawks | 0 | 0 | 0 | 0 | 0 |
| No. 21 Crimson Tide | 21 | 21 | 10 | 21 | 73 |

at Bryant–Denny Stadium • Tuscaloosa, AL

- Date: September 6
- Game time: 6:45 p.m.
- Game weather: Cloudy • Temperature: 77 °F (25 °C) • Wind: N at 7 miles per hour (11 km/h)
- Game attendance: 100,077
- Referee: Tim Barker
- TV announcers (SECN): Tom Hart (play-by-play), Jordan Rodgers (analyst), and Cole Cubelic (sideline)

Game information

First quarter

- ALA – Germie Bernard 29-yard pass from Ty Simpson (Conor Talty kick), 12:02. Crimson Tide 7–0. Drive: 5 plays, 80 yards, 2:54.
- ALA – Germie Bernard 16-yard pass from Ty Simpson (Conor Talty kick), 8:10. Crimson Tide 14–0. Drive: 5 plays, 39 yards, 2:25.
- ALA – Richard Young 3-yard run (Conor Talty kick), 3:18. Crimson Tide 21–0. Drive: 5 plays, 23 yards, 2:56.

Second quarter

- ALA – Ty Simpson 8-yard run (Conor Talty kick), 13:04. Crimson Tide 28–0. Drive: 6 plays, 65 yards, 2:49.
- ALA – Kaleb Edwards 6-yard pass from Austin Mack (Conor Talty kick), 9:20. Crimson Tide 35–0. Drive: 5 plays, 39 yards, 2:18.
- ALA – Isaiah Horton 29-yard pass from Ty Simpson (Conor Talty kick), 0:31. Crimson Tide 42–0. Drive: 10 plays, 58 yards, 5:17.

Third quarter

- ALA – Conor Talty 46-yard field goal, 6:20. Crimson Tide 45–0. Drive: 12 plays, 48 yards, 5:46.
- ALA – Josh Cuevas 3-yard pass from Austin Mack (Peter Notaro kick), 0:17. Crimson Tide 52–0. Drive: 10 plays, 56 yards, 4:29.

Fourth quarter

- ALA – Cole Adams 18-yard pass from Keelon Russell (Peter Notaro kick), 12:46. Crimson Tide 59–0. Drive: 3 plays, 19 yards, 0:59.
- ALA – MJ Chirgwin 20-yard pass from Keelon Russell (Peter Notaro kick), 6:07. Crimson Tide 66–0. Drive: 6 plays, 56 yards, 2:45.
- ALA – AK Dear 56-yard run (Peter Notaro kick), 1:02. Crimson Tide 73–0. Drive: 3 plays, 60 yards, 1:32.

| Statistics | ULM | ALA |
|---|---|---|
| First downs | 9 | 29 |
| Plays–yards | 50–148 | 69–583 |
| Rushes–yards | 32–93 | 36–212 |
| Passing yards | 55 | 371 |
| Passing: comp–att–int | 10–18–1 | 29–33–0 |
| Turnovers | 3 | 0 |
| Time of possession | 25:46 | 34:14 |

| Team | Category | Player | Statistics |
|---|---|---|---|
| Louisiana–Monroe | Passing | Aidan Armenta | 8/14, 28 yards, INT |
| Louisiana–Monroe | Rushing | Braylon McReynolds | 7 carries, 24 yards |
| Louisiana–Monroe | Receiving | Tyler Griffin | 2 receptions, 22 yards |
| Alabama | Passing | Ty Simpson | 17/17, 226 yards, 3 TD |
| Alabama | Rushing | AK Dear | 5 carries, 76 yards, TD |
| Alabama | Receiving | Germie Bernard | 3 receptions, 67 yards, 2 TD |

=== vs Wisconsin ===
Wisconsin Badgers (2–0) at No. 19 Alabama Crimson Tide (1–1) – Game summary

| Quarter | 1 | 2 | 3 | 4 | Total |
|---|---|---|---|---|---|
| Badgers | 0 | 0 | 7 | 7 | 14 |
| No. 19 Crimson Tide | 7 | 14 | 14 | 3 | 38 |

at Bryant–Denny Stadium • Tuscaloosa, AL

- Date: September 13
- Game time: 11:00 a.m.
- Game weather: Sunny, 83 °F (28 °C); Wind: NW 5 mph
- Game attendance: 100,077
- Referee: Matt Loeffler
- TV announcers (ABC): Joe Tessitore (play-by-play), Jesse Palmer (analyst), and Katie George (sideline)

Game information

First quarter

- ALA – Germie Bernard 2-yard run (Conor Talty kick), 2:24. Alabama 7–0 Drive: 11 plays, 61 yards, 6:29.

Second quarter

- ALA – Germie Bernard 43-yard pass from Ty Simpson (Conor Talty kick), 12:05. Alabama 14–0 Drive: 4 plays, 65 yards, 1:46.
- ALA – Isaiah Horton 13-yard pass from Ty Simpson (Conor Talty kick), 0:45. Alabama 21–0 Drive: 8 plays, 98 yards, 4:58.

Third quarter

- ALA – Ryan Coleman-Williams 75-yard pass from Ty Simpson (Conor Talty kick), 14:45. Alabama 28–0 Drive: 1 play, 75 yards, 0:15.
- WIS – Vinny Anthony II 95-yard kickoff return (Nathanial Vakos kick), 14:32. Alabama 28–7
- ALA – Ryan Coleman-Williams 41-yard pass from Ty Simpson (Conor Talty kick), 11:02. Alabama 35–7 Drive: 7 plays, 87 yards, 3:30.

Fourth quarter

- ALA – Conor Talty 33-yard field goal, 13:56. Alabama 38–7. Drive: 12 plays, 73 yards, 6:00.
- WIS – Jayden Ballard 41-yard pass from Danny O'Neil (Nathanial Vakos kick), 5:29. Alabama 38–14 Drive: 7 plays, 70 yards, 3:58.

| Statistics | WIS | ALA |
|---|---|---|
| First downs | 14 | 22 |
| Plays–yards | 51–209 | 52–454 |
| Rushes–yards | 34–92 | 22–72 |
| Passing yards | 117 | 382 |
| Passing: comp–att–int | 11–17–2 | 24–30–0 |
| Turnovers | 2 | 0 |
| Time of possession | 31:17 | 28:43 |

| Team | Category | Player | Statistics |
|---|---|---|---|
| Wisconsin | Passing | Danny O'Neil | 11/17, 117 yards, TD, 2 INT |
| Wisconsin | Rushing | Darrion Dupree | 7 carries, 26 yards |
| Wisconsin | Receiving | Jayden Ballard | 1 reception, 41 yards, TD |
| Alabama | Passing | Ty Simpson | 24/29, 382 yards, 4 TD |
| Alabama | Rushing | Ty Simpson | 6 carries, 25 yards |
| Alabama | Receiving | Ryan Coleman-Williams | 5 receptions, 165 yards, 2 TD |

=== at No. 5 Georgia (rivalry) ===
No. 17 Alabama Crimson Tide (2–1) at No. 5 Georgia Bulldogs (3–0) – Game summary

| Quarter | 1 | 2 | 3 | 4 | Total |
|---|---|---|---|---|---|
| No. 17 Crimson Tide | 7 | 17 | 0 | 0 | 24 |
| No. 5 Bulldogs | 0 | 14 | 7 | 0 | 21 |

at Sanford Stadium • Athens, GA

- Date: September 27
- Game time: 6:30 p.m.
- Game weather: Cloudy, 76 °F (24 °C); Wind: NW 2 mph
- Game attendance: 93,033
- Referee: Kyle Olson
- TV announcers (ABC): Chris Fowler (play-by-play), Kirk Herbstreit (analyst), Holly Rowe and Laura Rutledge (sideline reporters)

Game information

First quarter

- (7:41) ALA – Germie Bernard 6-yard pass from Ty Simpson, Conor Talty kick (Drive: 14 plays, 74 yards, 6:30; Alabama 7–0)

Second quarter

- (14:01) ALA – Isaiah Horton 6-yard pass from Ty Simpson, Conor Talty kick (Drive: 14 plays, 83 yards, 6:57; Alabama 14–0)
- (12:48) UGA – Colbie Young 38-yard pass from Gunner Stockton, Peyton Woodring kick (Drive: 3 plays, 75 yards, 1:13; Alabama 14–7)
- (8:30) ALA – Conor Talty 24-yard field goal (Drive: 4 plays, 5 yards, 1:28; Alabama 17–7)
- (2:08) UGA – Chauncey Bowens 2-yard run, Peyton Woodring kick (Drive: 11 plays, 75 yards, 6:22; Alabama 17–14)
- (0:34) ALA – Ty Simpson 2-yard run, Conor Talty kick (Drive: 8 plays, 75 yards, 1:34; Alabama 24–14)

Third quarter

- (6:30) UGA – Josh McCray 1-yard run, Peyton Woodring kick (Drive: 6 plays, 74 yards, 3:07; Alabama 24–21)

Fourth quarter

No scoring plays

| Statistics | ALA | UGA |
|---|---|---|
| First downs | 25 | 17 |
| Plays–yards | 77–397 | 53–357 |
| Rushes–yards | 38–117 | 33–227 |
| Passing yards | 280 | 130 |
| Passing: comp–att–int | 25–39–0 | 13–20–0 |
| Turnovers | 0 | 1 |
| Time of possession | 35:36 | 24:24 |

| Team | Category | Player | Statistics |
|---|---|---|---|
| Alabama | Passing | Ty Simpson | 24/38, 276 yards, 2 TD |
| Alabama | Rushing | Jam Miller | 16 carries, 46 yards |
| Alabama | Receiving | Isaiah Horton | 5 receptions, 65 yards, TD |
| Georgia | Passing | Gunner Stockton | 13/20, 130 yards, TD |
| Georgia | Rushing | Chauncey Bowens | 12 carries, 119 yards, TD |
| Georgia | Receiving | Colbie Young | 4 receptions, 59 yards, TD |

=== vs No. 16 Vanderbilt ===
No. 16 Vanderbilt Commodores (5–0) at No. 10 Alabama Crimson Tide (3–1) – Game summary

| Quarter | 1 | 2 | 3 | 4 | Total |
|---|---|---|---|---|---|
| No. 16 Commodores | 7 | 7 | 0 | 0 | 14 |
| No. 10 Crimson Tide | 0 | 14 | 6 | 10 | 30 |

at Bryant–Denny Stadium • Tuscaloosa, AL

- Date: October 4
- Game time: 2:30 p.m.
- Game weather: Sunny, 83 °F (28 °C); Wind: W 9 mph
- Game attendance: 100,077
- Referee: Daniel Gautreaux
- TV announcers (ABC): Sean McDonough (play-by-play), Greg McElroy (analyst), and Molly McGrath (sideline)

Game information

First quarter

- (6:34) VAN – Sedrick Alexander 65-yard run, Brock Taylor kick (Drive: 6 plays, 93 yards, 3:13; Vanderbilt 7–0)

Second quarter

- (9:22) ALA – Ryan Williams 14-yard pass from Ty Simpson, Conor Talty kick (Drive: 12 plays, 92 yards, 7:24; Tied 7–7)
- (1:33) VAN – Sedrick Alexander 4-yard pass from Diego Pavia, Brock Taylor kick (Drive: 10 plays, 38 yards, 4:23; Vanderbilt 14–7)
- (0:17) ALA – Germie Bernard 27-yard pass from Ty Simpson, Conor Talty kick (Drive: 6 plays, 78 yards, 1:11; Tied 14–14)

Third quarter

- (9:15) ALA – Conor Talty 38-yard field goal (Drive: 6 plays, 68 yards, 3:34; Alabama 17–14)
- (1:17) ALA – Conor Talty 30-yard field goal (Drive: 11 plays, 66 yards, 5:56; Alabama 20–14)

Fourth quarter

- (4:08) ALA – Conor Talty 30-yard field goal (Drive: 16 plays, 69 yards, 8:29; Alabama 23–14)
- (0:17) ALA – Jam Miller 20-yard run, Conor Talty kick (Drive: 4 plays, 28 yards, 1:01; Alabama 30–14)

| Statistics | VAN | ALA |
|---|---|---|
| First downs | 16 | 25 |
| Plays–yards | 54–333 | 69–486 |
| Rushes–yards | 19–135 | 38–146 |
| Passing yards | 198 | 340 |
| Passing: comp–att–int | 21–35–1 | 23–31–1 |
| Turnovers | 2 | 1 |
| Time of possession | 22:37 | 37:23 |

| Team | Category | Player | Statistics |
|---|---|---|---|
| Vanderbilt | Passing | Diego Pavia | 21/35, 198 yards, TD, INT |
| Vanderbilt | Rushing | Sedrick Alexander | 4 carries, 76 yards, TD |
| Vanderbilt | Receiving | Junior Sherrill | 6 receptions, 49 yards |
| Alabama | Passing | Ty Simpson | 23/31, 340 yards, 2 TD, INT |
| Alabama | Rushing | Jam Miller | 22 carries, 136 yards, TD |
| Alabama | Receiving | Ryan Williams | 6 receptions, 98 yards, TD |

=== at No. 14 Missouri ===
No. 8 Alabama Crimson Tide (4–1) at No. 14 Missouri Tigers (5–0) – Game summary

| Quarter | 1 | 2 | 3 | 4 | Total |
|---|---|---|---|---|---|
| No. 8 Crimson Tide | 7 | 10 | 3 | 7 | 27 |
| No. 14 Tigers | 7 | 3 | 7 | 7 | 24 |

at Faurot Field • Columbia, MO

- Date: October 11
- Game time: 11:00 a.m.
- Game weather: Sunny, 66 °F (19 °C); Wind: E 4 mph
- Game attendance: 57,321
- Referee: Jason Autrey
- TV announcers (ABC): Joe Tessitore (play-by-play), Jesse Palmer (analyst), and Katie George (sideline)

Game information

First quarter

- (12:10) MIZ – Brett Norfleet 26-yard pass from Beau Pribula, Robert Meyer kick (Drive: 6 plays, 78 yards, 2:43; Missouri 7–0)
- (6:05) ALA – Kevin Riley 6-yard pass from Ty Simpson, Conor Talty kick (Drive: 11 plays, 78 yards, 5:58; Tied 7–7)

Second quarter

- (14:51) ALA – Isaiah Horton 16-yard pass from Ty Simpson, Conor Talty kick (Drive: 10 plays, 67 yards, 4:48; Alabama 14–7)
- (7:10) ALA – Conor Talty 46-yard field goal (Drive: 9 plays, 40 yards, 4:47; Alabama 17–7)
- (0:00) MIZ – Robert Meyer 35-yard field goal (Drive: 10 plays, 57 yards, 3:32; Alabama 17–10)

Third quarter

- (13:18) MIZ – Beau Pribula 5-yard run, Robert Meyer kick (Drive: 3 plays, 19 yards, 1:2;7 Tied 17–17)
- (0:09) ALA – Conor Talty 22-yard field goal (Drive: 17 plays, 66 yards, 9:00; Alabama 20–17)

Fourth quarter

- (3:16) ALA – Daniel Hill 1-yard pass from Ty Simpson, Conor Talty kick (Drive: 8 plays, 40 yards, 3:46; Alabama 27–17)
- (1:39) MIZ – Donovan Olugbode 3-yard pass from Beau Pribula, Robert Meyer kick (Drive: 7 plays, 75 yards, 1:37; Alabama 27–24)

| Statistics | ALA | MIZ |
|---|---|---|
| First downs | 22 | 15 |
| Plays–yards | 75–325 | 56–330 |
| Rushes–yards | 44–125 | 28–163 |
| Passing yards | 200 | 167 |
| Passing: comp–att–int | 23–31–0 | 16–28–2 |
| Turnovers | 1 | 2 |
| Time of possession | 38:33 | 21:27 |

| Team | Category | Player | Statistics |
|---|---|---|---|
| Alabama | Passing | Ty Simpson | 23/31, 200 yards, 3 TD |
| Alabama | Rushing | Jam Miller | 20 carries, 85 yards |
| Alabama | Receiving | Lotzeir Brooks | 4 receptions, 58 yards |
| Missouri | Passing | Beau Pribula | 16/28, 167 yards, 2 TD, 2 INT |
| Missouri | Rushing | Beau Pribula | 11 carries, 61 yards, TD |
| Missouri | Receiving | Donovan Olugbode | 3 receptions, 55 yards, TD |

=== vs No. 11 Tennessee (Third Saturday in October) ===
No. 11 Tennessee Volunteers (5–1) at No. 6 Alabama Crimson Tide (5–1) – Game summary

| Quarter | 1 | 2 | 3 | 4 | Total |
|---|---|---|---|---|---|
| No. 11 Volunteers | 0 | 7 | 6 | 7 | 20 |
| No. 6 Crimson Tide | 7 | 16 | 7 | 7 | 37 |

at Bryant–Denny Stadium • Tuscaloosa, AL

- Date: October 18
- Game time: 6:30 p.m.
- Game weather: Cloudy • Temperature: 82 °F (28 °C) • Wind: NW at 10 miles per hour (16 km/h)
- Game attendance: 100,077
- Referee: Jeff Heaser
- TV announcers (ABC): Sean McDonough (play-by-play), Greg McElroy (analyst), and Molly McGrath (sideline)

Game information

First quarter

- ALA - Isaiah Horton 2-yard pass from Ty Simpson (Conor Talty kick), 6:51. Crimson Tide 7-0. Drive: 11 plays, 91 yards, 6:02.

Second quarter

- TENN - Braylon Staley 2-yard pass from Joey Aguilar (Max Gilbert kick), 9:46. Tied 7-7. Drive: 10 plays, 78 yards, 4:14.
- ALA - Team Safety, 7:27. Crimson Tide 9-7.
- ALA - Jam Miller 1-yard run (Conor Talty kick), 4:05. Crimson Tide 16-7. Drive: 7 plays, 69 yards, 3:22.
- ALA - Zabien Brown 99-yard interception return (Conor Talty kick), 0:00. Crimson Tide 23-7.

Third quarter

- TENN - DeSean Bishop 44-yard run (Two-Point pass Conversion failed), 11:18. Crimson Tide 23-13. Drive: 4 plays, 61 yards, 1:39.
- ALA - Rico Scott 11-yard pass from Ty Simpson (Conor Talty Kick), 0:25. Crimson Tide 30-13. Drive: 9 plays, 99 yards, 5:26.

Fourth quarter

- TENN - DeSean Bishop 1-yard run (Max Gilbert kick), 10:51. Crimson Tide 30-20. Drive: 13 plays, 75 yards, 4:34.
- ALA - Daniel Hill 4-yard run (Conor Talty kick), 5:49. Crimson Tide 37-20. Drive: 10 plays, 75 yards, 5:02.

| Statistics | TENN | ALA |
|---|---|---|
| First downs | 27 | 23 |
| Plays–yards | 77–410 | 61–373 |
| Rushes–yards | 33–142 | 32–120 |
| Passing yards | 268 | 253 |
| Passing: comp–att–int | 28–44–1 | 19–29–0 |
| Turnovers | 1 | 1 |
| Time of possession | 28:56 | 31:04 |

| Team | Category | Player | Statistics |
|---|---|---|---|
| Tennessee | Passing | Joey Aguilar | 28/44, 268 yards, TD, INT |
| Tennessee | Rushing | DeSean Bishop | 14 carries, 123 yards, 2 TD |
| Tennessee | Receiving | Braylon Staley | 10 receptions, 92 yards, TD |
| Alabama | Passing | Ty Simpson | 19/29, 253 yards, 2 TD |
| Alabama | Rushing | Germie Bernard | 4 carries, 49 yards |
| Alabama | Receiving | Ryan Williams | 5 receptions, 87 yards |

=== at South Carolina ===
No. 4 Alabama Crimson Tide (6–1) at South Carolina Gamecocks (3–4) – Game summary

| Quarter | 1 | 2 | 3 | 4 | Total |
|---|---|---|---|---|---|
| No. 4 Crimson Tide | 7 | 7 | 0 | 15 | 29 |
| Gamecocks | 3 | 3 | 9 | 7 | 22 |

at Williams–Brice Stadium • Columbia, SC

- Date: October 25
- Game time: 2:30 p.m.
- Game weather: Sunny • Temperature: 69 °F (21 °C) • Wind: NE at 5 miles per hour (8.0 km/h)
- Game attendance: 79,537
- Referee: Daniel Gautreaux
- TV announcers (ABC): Joe Tessitore (play-by-play), Jesse Palmer (analyst), and Katie George (sideline)

Game information

First quarter

- SC - William Joyce 24-yard field goal, 7:32. Gamecocks 3-0. Drive: 15 plays, 74 yards, 7:28.
- ALA - DaShawn Jones 18-yard interception return (Conor Talty kick), 5:17. Crimson Tide 7-3. Drive: 1 play, 0 yards, 0:10.

Second quarter

- SC - William Joyce 34-yard field goal, 4:23. Crimson Tide 7-6. Drive: 14 plays, 42 yards, 6:58.
- ALA - Josh Cuevas 3-yard pass from Ty Simpson (Conor Talty kick), 1:45. Crimson Tide 14-6. Drive: 9 plays, 81 yards, 2:38.

Third quarter

- SC - Nyck Harbor 54-yard pass from LaNorris Sellers (Two-Point Pass Conversion Failed), 10:59. Crimson Tide 14-12. Drive: 1 play, 54 yards, 0:09.
- SC - William Joyce 47-yard field goal, 1:38. Gamecocks 15-14. Drive: 11 plays, 46 yards, 4:53.

Fourth quarter

- SC - LaNorris Sellers 10-yard run (William Joyce kick), 10:00. Gamecocks 22-14. Drive: 6 plays, 30 yards, 3:28.
- ALA - Germie Bernard 4-yard pass from Ty Simpson (Ty Simpson pass to Josh Cuevas for Two-Point Conversation), 2:16. Tied 22-22. Drive: 14 plays, 79 yards, 7:44.
- ALA - Germie Bernard 25-yard run (Conor Talty kick), 0:34. Crimson Tide 29-22. Drive: 5 plays, 38 yards, 1:05.

| Statistics | ALA | SC |
|---|---|---|
| First downs | 17 | 18 |
| Plays–yards | 70–333 | 66–325 |
| Rushes–yards | 37–111 | 23–72 |
| Passing yards | 253 | 222 |
| Passing: comp–att–int | 18–33–1 | 24–43–0 |
| Turnovers | 2 | 2 |
| Time of possession | 27:22 | 32:38 |

| Team | Category | Player | Statistics |
|---|---|---|---|
| Alabama | Passing | Ty Simpson | 24/43, 253 yards, 2 TD |
| Alabama | Rushing | Jam Miller | 10 carries, 26 yards |
| Alabama | Receiving | Daniel Hill | 4 receptions, 76 yards |
| South Carolina | Passing | LaNorris Sellers | 18/32, 222 yards, TD, INT |
| South Carolina | Rushing | LaNorris Sellers | 18 carries, 67 yards, TD |
| South Carolina | Receiving | Nyck Harbor | 1 reception, 54 yards, TD |

=== vs LSU (rivalry) ===
LSU Tigers (5–3) at No. 4 Alabama Crimson Tide (7–1) – Game summary

| Quarter | 1 | 2 | 3 | 4 | Total |
|---|---|---|---|---|---|
| Tigers | 0 | 3 | 3 | 3 | 9 |
| No. 4 Crimson Tide | 3 | 14 | 0 | 3 | 20 |

at Bryant–Denny Stadium • Tuscaloosa, AL

- Date: November 8
- Game time: 6:30 p.m.
- Game weather: 67 degrees, Sunny
- Game attendance: 100,077
- Referee: Matt Loeffler
- TV announcers (ABC): Sean McDonough (play-by-play), Greg McElroy (analyst), and Molly McGrath (sideline)

Game information

First quarter

- ALA - Conor Talty 45-yard field goal, 1:20. Crimson Tide 3-0. Drive: 4 plays, -2 yards, 1:00.

Second quarter

- LSU - Damian Ramos 37-yard field goal, 12:27. Tied 3-3. Drive: 9 plays, 48 yards, 3:53.
- ALA - Daniel Hill 4-yard run (Conor Talty kick), 9:25. Crimson Tide 10-3. Drive: 7 plays, 75 yards, 3:02.
- ALA - Ryan Williams 13-yard pass from Ty Simpson (Conor Talty kick), 0:22. Crimson Tide 17-3. Drive: 3 plays, 66 yards, 0:34.

Third quarter

- LSU - Damian Ramos 44-yard field goal, 8:54. Crimson Tide 17-6. Drive: 11 plays, 48 yards, 6:06.

Fourth quarter

- LSU - Damian Ramos 37-yard field goal, 10:28. Crimson Tide 17-9. Drive: 9 plays, 18 yards, 4:25.
- ALA - Conor Talty 44-yard field goal, 4:25. Crimson Tide 20-9. Drive: 6 plays, 29 yards, 2:46.

| Statistics | LSU | ALA |
|---|---|---|
| First downs | 13 | 17 |
| Plays–yards | 58–232 | 62–344 |
| Rushes–yards | 26–59 | 26–56 |
| Passing yards | 173 | 288 |
| Passing: comp–att–int | 23–32–0 | 22–36–0 |
| Turnovers | 2 | 1 |
| Time of possession | 31:49 | 28:11 |

| Team | Category | Player | Statistics |
|---|---|---|---|
| LSU | Passing | Garrett Nussmeier | 18/21, 121 yards |
| LSU | Rushing | Harlem Berry | 12 carries, 66 yards |
| LSU | Receiving | Zavion Thomas | 5 receptions, 49 yards |
| Alabama | Passing | Ty Simpson | 21/35, 277 yards, TD |
| Alabama | Rushing | Daniel Hill | 7 carries, 21 yards, TD |
| Alabama | Receiving | Germie Bernard | 3 receptions, 79 yards |

=== vs No. 11 Oklahoma ===
No. 11 Oklahoma Sooners (7–2) at No. 4 Alabama Crimson Tide (8–1) – Game summary

| Quarter | 1 | 2 | 3 | 4 | Total |
|---|---|---|---|---|---|
| No. 11 Sooners | 10 | 7 | 3 | 3 | 23 |
| No. 4 Crimson Tide | 0 | 14 | 7 | 0 | 21 |

at Bryant–Denny Stadium • Tuscaloosa, AL

- Date: November 15
- Game time: 2:30 p.m.
- Game weather: Sunny • Temperature: 76 °F (24 °C) • Wind: NE at 13 miles per hour (21 km/h)
- Game attendance: 100,077
- Referee: Daniel Gautreaux
- TV announcers (ABC): Sean McDonough (play-by-play), Greg McElroy (analyst), and Molly McGrath (sideline)

Game information

First quarter

- (11:33) OU – Tate Sandell 25-yard field goal (Drive: 5 plays, 23 yards, 1:57; OU 3–0)
- (2:03) OU – Eli Bowen 87-yard interception return, Tate Sandell kick (Drive: 9 plays, 57 yards, 4:08; OU 10–0)

Second quarter

- (10:36) ALA – Daniel Hill 1-yard run, Conor Talty kick (Drive: 12 plays, 72 yards, 6:21; OU 10–7)
- (8:49) OU – John Mateer 20-yard run, Tate Sandell kick (Drive: 2 plays, 31 yards, 0:45; OU 17–7)
- (6:13) ALA – Josh Cuevas 25-yard pass from Ty Simpson, Conor Talty kick (Drive: 6 plays, 78 yards, 2:28; OU 17–14)

Third quarter

- (10:42) OU – Tate Sandell 52-yard field goal (Drive: 8 plays, 41 yards, 4:22; OU 20–14)
- (7:27) ALA – Daniel Hill 1-yard run, Connor Talty kick (Drive: 7 plays, 75 yards, 3:11; ALA 21–20)
- (13:42) OU – Tate Sandell 24-yard field goal (Drive: 5 plays, 22 yards, 2:09; OU 23–21)

Fourth quarter

No scoring plays

| Statistics | OU | ALA |
|---|---|---|
| First downs | 12 | 23 |
| Plays–yards | 51–212 | 75–406 |
| Rushes–yards | 28–74 | 33–80 |
| Passing yards | 138 | 326 |
| Passing: comp–att–int | 15–23–0 | 28–42–1 |
| Turnovers | 0 | 3 |
| Time of possession | 25:32 | 34:28 |

| Team | Category | Player | Statistics |
|---|---|---|---|
| Oklahoma | Passing | John Mateer | 15/23, 138 yards |
| Oklahoma | Rushing | John Mateer | 10 carries, 23 yards, TD |
| Oklahoma | Receiving | Jer'Michael Carter | 3 receptions, 36 yards |
| Alabama | Passing | Ty Simpson | 28/42, 326 yards, TD, INT |
| Alabama | Rushing | Daniel Hill | 15 carries, 60 yards, 2 TD |
| Alabama | Receiving | Josh Cuevas | 6 receptions, 80 yards, TD |

=== vs Eastern Illinois (FCS) ===
Eastern Illinois Panthers (FCS) (3–8) at No. 10 Alabama Crimson Tide (8–2) – Game summary

| Quarter | 1 | 2 | 3 | 4 | Total |
|---|---|---|---|---|---|
| Panthers (FCS) | 0 | 0 | 0 | 0 | 0 |
| No. 10 Crimson Tide | 14 | 14 | 14 | 14 | 56 |

at Bryant–Denny Stadium • Tuscaloosa, AL

- Date: November 22
- Game time: 1:00 p.m.
- Game weather: Sunny, 77 degrees
- Game attendance: 100,077
- Referee: Lee Hedrick
- TV announcers (SECN+/ESPN+): Jay Alter (play-by-play), Rocky Boiman (analyst) and Tori Petry (sideline)

Game information

First quarter

- ALA - Jam Miller 1-yard run (Conor Talty kick), 9:45. Crimson Tide 7-0. Drive: 8 plays, 46 yards, 3:09.
- ALA - Daniel Hill 7-yard run (Conor Talty kick), 4:49. Crimson Tide 14-0. Drive: 5 plays, 38 yards, 2:43.

Second quarter

- ALA - Kevin Riley 1-yard run (Conor Talty kick), 10:04. Crimson Tide 21-0. Drive: 8 plays, 64 yards, 4:48.
- ALA - Kevin Riley 2-yard run (Peter Notaro kick), 1:05. Crimson Tide 28-0. Drive: 9 plays, 69 yards, 4:16.

Third quarter

- ALA - AK Dear 1-yard run (Conor Talty kick), 11:03. Crimson Tide 35-0. Drive: 8 plays, 59 yards, 3:53.
- ALA - Austin Mack 20-yard run (Conor Talty Kick), 1:05. Crimson Tide 42-0. Drive: 2 plays, 40 yards, 0:47.

Fourth quarter

- ALA - Richard Young 2-yard run (Reid Schuback kick), 7:34. Crimson Tide 49-0. Drive: 13 plays, 65 yards, 6:45.
- ALA - AK Dear 5-yard run (Tucker Cornelius kick), 1:15. Crimson Tide 56-0. Drive: 7 plays, 53 yards, 3:41.

| Statistics | EIU | ALA |
|---|---|---|
| First downs | 2 | 32 |
| Plays–yards | 39–34 | 79–539 |
| Rushes–yards | 30–14 | 49–269 |
| Passing yards | 20 | 270 |
| Passing: comp–att–int | 4–9–1 | 23–30–2 |
| Turnovers | 1 | 2 |
| Time of possession | 21:51 | 38:09 |

| Team | Category | Player | Statistics |
|---|---|---|---|
| Eastern Illinois | Passing | Connor Wolf | 4/8, 20 yards |
| Eastern Illinois | Rushing | Charles Kellom | 14 carries, 25 yards |
| Eastern Illinois | Receiving | Landers Green | 1 reception, 15 yards |
| Alabama | Passing | Ty Simpson | 11/16, 147 yards, 2 INT |
| Alabama | Rushing | Jam Miller | 11 carries, 62 yards, TD |
| Alabama | Receiving | Jaylen Mbakwe | 2 receptions, 39 yards |

=== at Auburn (Iron Bowl) ===
No. 10 Alabama Crimson Tide (9–2) at Auburn Tigers (5–6) – Game summary

| Quarter | 1 | 2 | 3 | 4 | Total |
|---|---|---|---|---|---|
| No. 10 Crimson Tide | 10 | 7 | 3 | 7 | 27 |
| Tigers | 0 | 6 | 7 | 7 | 20 |

at Jordan-Hare Stadium • Auburn, AL

- Date: November 29
- Game time: 6:30 p.m.
- Game weather: Cloudy • Temperature: 46 °F (8 °C) • Wind: E at 6 miles per hour (9.7 km/h)
- Game attendance: 88,043
- Referee: Matt Loeffler
- TV announcers (ABC): Chris Fowler (play-by-play), Kirk Herbstreit (analyst), and Holly Rowe (sideline)

Game information

First quarter

- ALA - Conor Talty 45-yard field goal, 7:29. Crimson Tide 3-0. Drive: 10 plays, 27 yards, 4:19.
- ALA - Isaiah Horton 6-yard pass from Ty Simpson (Conor Talty kick), 1:14. Crimson Tide 10-0. Drive: 7 plays, 65 yards, 3:42.

Second quarter

- ALA - Isaiah Horton 3-yard pass from Ty Simpson (Conor Talty kick), 11:28. Crimson Tide 17-0. Drive: 6 plays, 64 yards, 3:03.
- AUB - Alex McPherson 26-yard field goal, 4:06. Crimson Tide 17-3. Drive: 10 plays, 43 yards, 4:19.
- AUB - Alex McPherson 43-yard field goal, 0:00. Crimson Tide 17-6. Drive: 10 plays, 48 yards, 2:40.

Third quarter

- AUB - Malcolm Simmons 64-yard pass from Ashton Daniels (Alex McPherson kick), 14:00. Crimson Tide 17-13. Drive: 4 plays, 76 yards, 0:52.
- ALA - Conor Talty 29-yard field goal, 7:31. Crimson Tide 20-13. Drive: 13 plays, 64 yards, 6:29.

Fourth quarter

- AUB - Jeremiah Cobb 2-yard run (Alex McPherson kick), 11:43. Tied 20-20. Drive: 6 plays, 88 yards, 2:31.
- ALA - Isaiah Horton 6-yard pass from Ty Simpson (Conor Talty kick), 3:50. Crimson Tide 27-20. Drive: 15 plays, 75 yards, 7:53.

| Statistics | ALA | AUB |
|---|---|---|
| First downs | 18 | 20 |
| Plays–yards | 75-280 | 77-259 |
| Rushes–yards | 38-158 | 36-152 |
| Passing yards | 122 | 259 |
| Passing: comp–att–int | 19-35-0 | 18-39-1 |
| Turnovers | 0 | 2 |
| Time of possession | 34:29 | 25:31 |

| Team | Category | Player | Statistics |
|---|---|---|---|
| Alabama | Passing | Ty Simpson | 19/35, 122 yards, 3 TD |
| Alabama | Rushing | Jam Miller | 15 carries, 83 yards |
| Alabama | Receiving | Isaiah Horton | 5 receptions, 35 yards, 3 TD |
| Auburn | Passing | Ashton Daniels | 18/39, 259 yards, TD, INT |
| Auburn | Rushing | Ashton Daniels | 23 carries, 108 yards |
| Auburn | Receiving | Malcolm Simmons | 3 receptions, 143 yards, TD |

=== vs No. 3 Georgia (SEC Championship) ===
2025 SEC Championship Game
No. 3 Georgia Bulldogs (11–1) vs. No. 9 Alabama Crimson Tide (10–2) – Game summary

| Quarter | 1 | 2 | 3 | 4 | Total |
|---|---|---|---|---|---|
| No. 3 Bulldogs | 7 | 7 | 7 | 7 | 28 |
| No. 9 Crimson Tide | 0 | 0 | 0 | 7 | 7 |

at Mercedes-Benz Stadium • Atlanta, GA

- Date: Saturday, December 6, 2025
- Game time: 3:00 pm CST
- Game weather: N/A (Indoor Stadium)
- Game attendance: 77,247
- Referee: Daniel Gautreaux
- TV announcers (ABC): Chris Fowler (play-by-play), Kirk Herbstreit (analyst), Holly Rowe and Laura Rutledge (sideline reporters)

Game information

First quarter

- (4:36) UGA – Roderick Robinson II 1-yard pass from Gunner Stockton, Peyton Woodring kick (Drive: 4 plays, 21 yards, 1:55; Georgia 7–0)

Second quarter

- (8:43) UGA – Dillon Bell 5-yard pass from Gunner Stockton, Peyton Woodring kick (Drive: 14 plays, 57 yards, 7:44; Georgia 14–0)

Third quarter

- (10:47) UGA – Nate Frazier 9-yard run, Peyton Woodring kick (Drive: 6 plays, 40 yards, 2:32; Georgia 21–0)

Fourth quarter

- (12:33) ALA – Germie Bernard 23-yard pass from Ty Simpson, Conor Talty kick (Drive: 9 plays, 91 yards, 2:37; Georgia 21–7)
- (6:51) UGA – Zachariah Branch 13-yard pass from Gunner Stockton, Peyton Woodring kick (Drive: 3 plays, 12 yards, 1:22; Georgia 28–7)

| Statistics | UGA | ALA |
|---|---|---|
| First downs | 16 | 11 |
| Plays–yards | 67–297 | 55–209 |
| Rushes–yards | 41–141 | 16–(-3) |
| Passing yards | 156 | 212 |
| Passing: comp–att–int | 20–26–0 | 19–39–1 |
| Turnovers | 0 | 1 |
| Time of possession | 36:52 | 23:08 |

| Team | Category | Player | Statistics |
|---|---|---|---|
| Georgia | Passing | Gunner Stockton | 20/26, 156 yards, 3 TD |
| Georgia | Rushing | Nate Frazier | 13 carries, 52 yards, TD |
| Georgia | Receiving | Zachariah Branch | 5 receptions, 53 yards, TD |
| Alabama | Passing | Ty Simpson | 19/39, 212 yards, TD, INT |
| Alabama | Rushing | Daniel Hill | 4 carries, 11 yards |
| Alabama | Receiving | Germie Bernard | 6 receptions, 62 yards, TD |

=== at No. 8 Oklahoma (College Football Playoff – First Round) ===
CFP First Round Game
No. 9 Alabama Crimson Tide (10–3) at No. 8 Oklahoma Sooners (10–2) – Game summary

| Quarter | 1 | 2 | 3 | 4 | Total |
|---|---|---|---|---|---|
| No. 9 Crimson Tide | 0 | 17 | 10 | 7 | 34 |
| No. 8 Sooners | 10 | 7 | 0 | 7 | 24 |

at Gaylord Family Oklahoma Memorial Stadium • Norman, OK

- Date: Friday, December 19, 2025
- Game time: 7:00 pm CST
- Game weather: Sunny • Temperature: 56 °F (13 °C) • Wind: N at 20 miles per hour (32 km/h)
- Game attendance: 83,550
- Referee: Kole Knueppel (Big Ten)
- TV announcers (ABC/ESPN): Chris Fowler (play-by-play), Kirk Herbstreit (analyst), Holly Rowe and Laura Rutledge (sideline reporters)

Game information

First quarter

- (5:29) OU – John Mateer 8-yard run, Tate Sandell kick (Drive: 8 plays, 59 yards, 3:34; OU 7–0)
- (0:45) OU – Tate Sandell 51-yard field goal (Drive: 6 plays, 13 yards, 3:00; OU 10–0)

Second quarter

- (10:51) OU – Isaiah Sategna III 7-yard pass from John Mateer, Tate Sandell kick (Drive: 8 plays, 63 yards, 3:57; OU 17–0)
- (6:52) ALA – Lotzeir Brooks 10-yard pass from Ty Simpson, Conor Talty kick (Drive: 9 plays, 75 yards, 3:59; OU 17–7)
- (2:08) ALA – Conor Talty 35-yard field goal (Drive: 5 plays, 13 yards, 2:15; OU 17–10)
- (1:18) ALA – Zabien Brown 50-yard interception return, Conor Talty kick (Drive: 4 plays, 24 yards, 0:50; Tied 17–17)

Third quarter

- (11:21) ALA – Lotzeir Brooks 30-yard pass from Ty Simpson, Conor Talty kick (Drive: 3 plays, 60 yards, 00:58; ALA 24–17)
- (4:30) ALA – Conor Talty 40-yard field goal (Drive: 9 plays, 40 yards, 4:56; ALA 27–17)

Fourth quarter

- (14:45) OU – Deion Burks 37-yard pass from John Mateer, Tate Sandell kick (Drive: 8 plays, 75 yards, 4:45; ALA 27–24)
- (7:24) ALA – Daniel Hill 6-yard run, Conor Talty kick (Drive: 4 plays, 35 yards, 1:56; ALA 24–34)

| Statistics | ALA | OU |
|---|---|---|
| First downs | 12 | 18 |
| Plays–yards | 54–260 | 75–362 |
| Rushes–yards | 25–28 | 33–55 |
| Passing yards | 232 | 307 |
| Passing: Comp–Att–Int | 18–29–0 | 26–42–1 |
| Turnovers | 0 | 1 |
| Time of possession | 26:52 | 33:08 |

| Team | Category | Player | Statistics |
|---|---|---|---|
| Alabama | Passing | Ty Simpson | 18/29, 232 yards, 2 TD |
| Alabama | Rushing | Daniel Hill | 9 carries, 43 yards, TD |
| Alabama | Receiving | Lotzeir Brooks | 5 receptions, 79 yards, 2 TD |
| Oklahoma | Passing | John Mateer | 26/41, 307 yards, 2 TD, INT |
| Oklahoma | Rushing | Tory Blaylock | 11 carries, 36 yards |
| Oklahoma | Receiving | Deion Burks | 7 receptions, 107 yards, TD |

=== vs. No. 1 Indiana (Rose Bowl - CFP Quarterfinal) ===
CFP Quarterfinal at the Rose Bowl Presented By Prudential
No. 9 Alabama Crimson Tide (11–3) vs. No. 1 Indiana Hoosiers (13–0) – Game summary

| Quarter | 1 | 2 | 3 | 4 | Total |
|---|---|---|---|---|---|
| No. 9 Crimson Tide | 0 | 0 | 3 | 0 | 3 |
| No. 1 Hoosiers | 0 | 17 | 7 | 14 | 38 |

at Rose Bowl • Pasadena, CA

- Date: January 1, 2026
- Game time: 3:00 pm CST
- Game attendance: 90,278
- Referee: Kevin Mar (Big 12)
- TV announcers (ESPN): Chris Fowler (play-by-play), Kirk Herbstreit (analyst), Holly Rowe and Kris Budden (sideline reporters)
- Recap

Game information

First quarter

- No scoring plays.

Second quarter

- IU – Nicolas Radicic 31-yard field goal, 14:57. Hoosiers 3–0. Drive: 16 plays, 84 yards, 8:55.
- IU – Charlie Becker 21-yard pass from Fernando Mendoza (Nico Radicic kick), 10:49. Hoosiers 10–0. Drive: 4 plays, 34 yards, 1:47.
- IU – Omar Cooper Jr. 1-yard pass from Fernando Mendoza (Nico Radicic kick), 0:17. Hoosiers 17–0. Drive: 11 plays, 58 yards, 2:52.

Third Quarter

- IU – Elijah Sarratt 24-yard pass from Fernando Mendoza (Nico Radicic kick), 7:46. Hoosiers 24–0. Drive: 10 plays, 79 yards, 5:40.
- BAMA – Conor Talty 28-yard field goal, 2:44. Hoosiers 24–3. Drive: 9 plays, 65 yards, 5:02.

Fourth quarter

- IU – Kaelon Black 25-yard run (Nico Radicic kick), 14:21. Hoosiers 31–3. Drive: 6 plays, 75 yards, 3:23.
- IU – Roman Hemby 18-yard run (Nico Radicic kick), 14:21. Hoosiers 38–3. Drive: 5 plays, 63 yards, 2:44.

| Statistics | ALA | IU |
|---|---|---|
| First downs | 11 | 22 |
| Plays–yards | 50–193 | 66–407 |
| Rushes–yards | 17–23 | 50–215 |
| Passing yards | 170 | 192 |
| Passing: Comp–Att–Int | 24-33-0 | 14-16-0 |
| Turnovers | 1 | 0 |
| Time of possession | 25:39 | 34:21 |

| Team | Category | Player | Statistics |
|---|---|---|---|
| Alabama | Passing | Austin Mack | 11/16, 103 yards |
| Alabama | Rushing | Ty Simpson | 3 carries, 17 yards |
| Alabama | Receiving | Germie Bernard | 4 receptions, 60 yards |
| Indiana | Passing | Fernando Mendoza | 14/16, 192 yards, 3 TD |
| Indiana | Rushing | Kaelon Black | 15 carries, 99 yards, TD |
| Indiana | Receiving | Charlie Becker | 2 receptions, 51 yards, TD |

== Personnel ==
=== Roster ===
2025 Alabama Crimson Tide Football
| Quarterbacks: 10 – Austin Mack– (redshirt) Sophomore (6'6, 226); 12 – Keelon Russell – Freshman (6'3, 192); 13 – John Gazzaniga – Freshman (6'7, 252); 15 – Ty Simpson – (redshirt) Junior (6'2, 203); 16 – Cade Carruth - Senior (6'1, 195); 19 – John Cooper – Sophomore (6'2, 192); Running backs: 0 – AK Dear – Freshman (6'0, 205); 4 - Daniel Hill - Sophomore (6'1, 231); 9 – Richard Young – (redshirt) Sophomore (5'11, 200); 20 – Dre Washington – Senior (5'9, 218); 26 – Jam Miller – Senior (5'10, 211); 27 – Michael Lorino III – Senior (6'0, 185); 28 - Kevin Riley - (redshirt) Freshman (5'11, 200); 29 – Fredrick Moore – Sophomore (5'9, 160); 34 – Jessie Washington III – Junior (5'9, 205); Wide receivers: 1 – Isaiah Horton – (redshirt) Junior (6'4, 205); 2 - Ryan Coleman-Williams - Sophomore (6'1, 175); 3 – Jaylen Mbakwe – Sophomore (5'11, 170); 5 - Germie Bernard - Senior (6'1, 203); 6 - Bubba Hampton - (redshirt) Freshman (5'10, 175); 7 – Cole Adams – (redshirt) Sophomore (5'10, 186); 8 – Jalen Hale – (redshirt) Sophomore (6'1, 189); 11 - Rico Scott - (redshirt) Freshman (6'1, 185); 17 – Lotzeir Brooks – Freshman (5'9, 185); 23 – MJ Chirgwin – (redshirt) Senior (6'0, 195); 30 – Derek Meadows – Freshman (6'7, 205); 31 – Cooper Mollison – Sophomore (5'10, 185); 32 – Jay Loper Jr. – Senior (5'11, 180); 42 – Ben Jackson – Freshman (6'2, 170); Tight ends: 18 – Marshall Prichett – Freshman (6'5, 215); 46 – Peyton Fox – Senior (6'4, 225); 47 – Lane Whisenhunt – Sophomore (6'2, 285); 80 – Josh Cuevas – (redshirt) Junior (6'3, 239); 81 – Kaleb Edwards – Freshman (6'6, 220); 46 – Jack Sammarco – Freshman (6'5, 252); 86 – Peter Knudson – Senior (6'4, 240); 87 – Danny Lewis Jr. – (redshirt) Sophomore (6'5, 255); 88 - Jay Lindsey - (redshirt) Freshman (6'5, 235); 89 - Brody Dalton – Senior (6'5, 250); Kicker/Punter: 31 – Conor Talty – (redshirt) Sophomore (6'2, 195) (K); 32 – Alex Asparuhov – Freshman (6'3, 190) (K); 37 – Peter Notaro - Freshman (5-11, 188) (K); 38 – Blake Doud – (redshirt) Senior (6'5, 215) (P); 95 - Anderson Green - Sophomore (6'0, 205) (P); 97 – Reid Schuback – (redshirt) Senior (6'0, 185) (K); 98 - Tucker Cornelius - Sophomore (6'3, 185) (K); Long snappers: 45 – David Bird – Junior (6'0, 220); 46 - Jay Williams - Sophomore (6'1, 195); 52 – Alex Rozier – Senior (6'4, 220) | Offensive Lineman: 50 - Casey Poe - (redshirt) Freshman (6'4, 290); 51 - Jackson Howell - Sophomore (6'5, 315); 52 – Mal Waldrep Jr. – Freshman (6'5, 280); 53 – Mac Smith – Junior (6'3, 270); 54 - JD Martin - Sophomore (6'2, 240); 55 – Roq Montgomery – (redshirt) Sophomore (6'3, 332); 56 - Geno VanDeMark - (redshirt) Senior (6'5, 320); 58 - Jamison Travis - Freshman (6'2, 305); 62 – Davis Peterson – Junior (6'1, 235); 63 - Diego Camboia - Sophomore (6'5, 287); 64 – Michael Carroll – Freshman (6'5, 290); 65 – Micah Debose – Freshman (6'5, 330); 66 – Baker Hickman – Junior (6'3, 315); 67 - Wade Estess - Sophomore (6'3, 305); 68 – Billy Roby – Junior (5'11, 245); 69 - Joseph Ionata - (redshirt) Freshman (6'5, 294); 70 - William Sanders - (redshirt) Freshman (6'3, 290); 71 – Kam Dewberry – Senior (6'4, 330); 72 - Parker Brailsford - (redshirt) Junior (6'2, 275); 73 – Olaus Alinen – (redshirt) Sophomore (6'6, 326); 74 – Kadyn Proctor – Junior (6'7, 360); 75 – Wilkin Formby – (redshirt) Sophomore (6'7, 320); 76 – Arkel Anugwom – (redshirt) Sophomore (6'6, 325); 77 – Jaeden Roberts – (redshirt) Senior (6'5, 316); 78 – Jackson Lloyd – Freshman (6'6, 295); Defensive Lineman: 11 – Jordan Renaud – (redshirt) Sophomore (6'4, 261); 14 – Fatutoa Henry – (redshirt) Junior (6'4, 268); 17 - Kelby Collins - Junior (6'4, 275); 22 - LT Overton - Senior (6'3, 265); 23 – James Smith – (redshirt) Junior (6'3, 296); 25 – Steve Bolo Mboumoua – Sophomore (6'4, 285); 31 – Keon Keeley – (redshirt) Sophomore (6'5, 242); 88 – Isaia Faga – (redshirt) Freshman (6'2, 275); 90 – London Simmons – Freshman (6'3, 305); 92 – Jeremiah Beaman – (redshirt) Freshman (6'4, 265); 94 – Edric Hill – (redshirt) Sophomore (6'3, 294); 96 – Tim Keenan III – (redshirt) Senior (6'2, 315) | Linebackers: 0 – Deontae Lawson – (redshirt) Senior (6'2, 230); 4 – Qua Russaw – (redshirt) Sophomore (6'3, 242); 8 – Justin Hill – Freshman (6'3, 220); 10 – Justin Jefferson – (redshirt) Senior (6'2, 225); 15 – Duke Johnson – Freshman (6'2, 205); 20 – Jah-Marien Latham – Graduate Student (6'3, 275); 24 – Noah Carter – (redshirt) Freshman (6'4, 220); 26 – Luke Metz – Freshman (6'3, 210); 30 – Cayden Jones – Sophomore (6'4, 210); 35 – Abudall Sanders Jr. – Freshman (6'2, 210); 36 – QB Reese – (redshirt) Freshman (6'4, 280); 39 – Jake Ivie – Junior (6'0, 205); 40 – Grant Johnson – Junior (6'0, 220); 41 – Nikhai Hill-Green – Graduate Student (6'2, 230); 42 – Yhonzae Pierre – (redshirt) Sophomore (6'3, 223); 53 – Vito Perri – (redshirt) Junior (6'0, 205); 56 – JD Baird – Senior (5'8, 190); Defensive backs: 1 - Domani Jackson - (redshirt) Senior (6'1, 190); 2 – Zabien Brown – Sophomore (6'0, 180); 3 – Keon Sabb – Senior (6'1, 208); 5 – Dijon Lee Jr. – Freshman (6'4, 190); 6 - Kameron Howard - (redshirt) Sophomore (5'11, 189); 7 – DaShawn Jones – (redshirt) Senior (6'0, 181); 9 – Cameron Calhoun – (redshirt) Sophomore (6'0, 177); 12 – Zavier Mincey – Sophomore (6'3, 180); 13 – Ivan Taylor – Freshman (6'0, 175); 16 – Red Morgan – Sophomore (6'0, 175); 18 – Bray Hubbard – Junior (6'2, 195); 19 – Chuck McDonald II – Freshman (6'0, 185); 21 – Dre Kirkpatrick Jr – Sophomore (5'11, 192); 27 – Walter Sansing – Junior (5'10, 160); 28 – Peyton Yates – Senior (5'10, 180); 29 – Kolby Peavy – Junior (6'1, 180); 32 – Griffin Hanson – Sophomore (5'10, 160); 33 – Kyle Clayton – Freshman (6'0, 190); 34 – London Hill – Freshman (5'11, 180); 37 – Cole Davis – Sophomore (6'0, 200); 38 – Brody McCutcheon – Freshman (6'1, 178); 48 – Prince Butler – (redshirt) Senior (6'1, 200); 49 – Connor Warhurst – Junior (6'2, 190) |
Legend: (C) Team captain; (S) Suspended; (I) Ineligible; Injured; Redshirt
Source and player details, 2025 Alabama Crimson Tide Football Commits (08/19/2025):

=== Coaching staff ===
Alabama head coach Kalen DeBoer will enter his second year as the Crimson Tide's head coach for the 2025 season. He led the Crimson Tide to a 9–4 record and ReliaQuest Bowl appearance in his first season.

| Name | Position | Consecutive season at Alabama in current position |
|---|---|---|
| Kalen DeBoer | Head coach | 2nd |
| Ryan Grubb | Offensive coordinator | 1st |
| Nick Sheridan | Co-offensive coordinator/Quarterbacks coach | 2nd |
| JaMarcus Shephard | Assistant head coach / Co-offensive coordinator / wide receivers coach | 2nd |
| Kane Wommack | Defensive coordinator | 2nd |
| Maurice Linguist | Co-defensive coordinator / Cornerbacks coach | 2nd |
| Jason Jones | Safeties coach | 1st |
| Bryan Ellis | Tight ends coach | 2nd |
| Robert Gillespie | Assistant head coach / running backs coach | 5th |
| Chris Kapilovic | Offensive line coach | 2nd |
| Freddie Roach | Associate head coach / defensive line coach | 6th |
| Chuck Morrell | Linebackers coach | 2nd |
| Christian Robinson | Outside linebackers coach | 2nd |
| Jay Nunez | Special teams coordinator | 2nd |
| Tyler Hughes | Analyst | 1st |
| David Ballou | Head Strength and conditioning coach | 6th |
Reference: 2025 Alabama Crimson Tide Football Media Guide

=== Depth chart ===
- Depth chart is a projection and is subject to change.

Defense
4-3

FS
Bray Hubbard
Zavier Mincey
Kameron Howard

| WOLF | MIKE | STINGER |
|---|---|---|
| Qua Russaw | Justin Jefferson | Deontae Lawson |
| Jan-Marien Latham | QB Reese | Nikhail Hill-Green |
| Yhonzae Pierre | Cayden Jones | Luke Metz |

SS
Keon Sabb
Dre Kirkpatrick Jr.
Ivan Taylor

CB
Domani Jackson
Dijon Lee Jr.
-

| DE | DT | DT | DE |
|---|---|---|---|
| LT Overton | James Smith | Tim Keenan III | DeShawn Jones |
| Jordan Renaud | Edric Hill | Jeremiah Beaman | Red Morgan |
| Keon Keeley | Isaia Faga | London Simmons | - |

CB
Zabien Brown
Cameron Calhoun
-

Offense
Pro-style

WR
Germie Bernard
Rico Scott
-

WR
Ryan Williams
Lotzeir Brooks
Cole Adams

| LT | LG | C | RG | RT |
|---|---|---|---|---|
| Kadyn Proctor | Kam Dewberry | Parker Brailsford | Gene VanDerMark | Wilkin Formby |
| Jackson Lloyd | William Sanders | Joseph Ionata | Jaeden Roberts | Michael Carroll |
| - | - | - | Olaus Alinen | - |

TE
Josh Cuevas
Brody Dalton
Marshall Pritchett

WR
Isaiah Horton
Jalen Hale
Derek Meadows

QB
Ty Simpson
Austin Mack
Keelon Russell

Key reserves
Offense
Defense
Special teams
Out (indefinitely)
Out (season)
Out (suspended)
Out (retired)

RB
Jam Miller
Richard Young
Daniel Hill
Dre Washington
Kevin Riley

Special teams
PK Conor Talty
PK Peter Notaro
P Blake Doud
P Alex Asparuhov
KR Rico Scott
Cole Adams
PR Cole Adams
Jaylen Mbakwe
Ryan Williams
LS David Bird
Alex Rozier
H Blake Doud

True Freshman
Double Position : *
projected Depth Chart Week 1 vs Florida State

=== Injury report ===
| Name | Position | Class | Injury | Duration |
|---|---|---|---|---|
| / | / | / | / | / |

== Statistics ==
=== Scoring ===
==== Alabama vs. non-conference opponents ====
| | 1 | 2 | 3 | 4 | Total |
|---|---|---|---|---|---|
| Opponents | 7 | 10 | 14 | 14 | 45 |
| Alabama | 48 | 59 | 41 | 45 | 193 |

==== Alabama vs. SEC opponents ====
| | 1 | 2 | 3 | 4 | Total |
|---|---|---|---|---|---|
| SEC opponents | 34 | 54 | 43 | 42 | 173 |
| Alabama | 38 | 88 | 29 | 60 | 215 |

==== Alabama vs. all opponents ====
| | 1 | 2 | 3 | 4 | Total |
|---|---|---|---|---|---|
| Opponents | 41 | 64 | 57 | 56 | 218 |
| Alabama | 86 | 147 | 70 | 105 | 408 |

== Awards and honors ==
=== Regular season honors ===
SEC Weekly Honors
| Date | Player | Class | Position | Honors | Ref. |
|---|---|---|---|---|---|
| Week 3 (Sept 15) | Bray Hubbard | S | Jr. | SEC Defensive Player of the Week | |
| Week 5 (Sept 29) | Ty Simpson | QB | R-Jr. | SEC Offensive Player of the Week | |
| Week 5 (Sept 29) | Kadyn Proctor | OL | Jr. | SEC Offensive Lineman Player of the Week | |
| Week 6 (Oct 6) | Justin Jefferson | LB | R-Sr. | SEC Defensive Player of the Week | |
| Week 6 (Oct 6) | Parker Brailsford | OL | R-Jr. | SEC Offensive Lineman Player of the Week | |
| Week 7 (Oct 13) | Ty Simpson (2) | R-Jr. | QB | SEC Offensive Player of the Week | |
| Week 8 (Oct 20) | Yhonzae Pierre | LB | R-So | SEC Co-Defensive Player of the Week | |
| Week 8 (Oct 20) | Zabien Brown | DB | So. | SEC Co-Defensive Player of the Week | |
| Week 11 (Nov 10) | Parker Brailsford (2) | OL | R-Jr. | SEC Offensive Lineman Player of the Week | |
| Week 14 (Dec 1) | Bray Hubbard (2) | S | Jr. | SEC Defensive Player of the Week | |

National Weekly Honors
| Date | Player | Class | Position | Honors | Source |
|---|---|---|---|---|---|
| Week 5 (Sept 29) | Ty Simpson | QB | R-Jr. | Davey O’Brien National Player of the Week; Manning Award Stars of the Week; Maxwell Award Player of the Week; Reeses Senior Bowl Player of the Week | |
| Week 6 (Oct 6) | Justin Jefferson | LB | R-Sr. | Bednarik Award Defensive Player of the Week | |
| Week 8 (Oct 20) | Yhonzae Pierre | LB | R-So. | Bednarik Award Defensive Player of the Week | |

=== Postseason honors ===
==== SEC Conference Individual Yearly awards ====
Southeastern Conference Individual Awards
| Recipient | Award | Date awarded | Ref. |
|---|---|---|---|
| Kadyn Proctor | Jacobs Blocking Trophy | Dec 10, 2025 | |

==== All-American honors ====
All-SEC
| Player | Position | Class | 1st/2nd/3rd team |
|---|---|---|---|
| Ty Simpson | QB | R-Jr | 2nd (AP, Coaches) |
| Kadyn Proctor | OL | Jr | 1st (AP, Coaches) |
| Parker Brailsford | OL | R-Jr | 3rd (Coaches) |
| Deontae Lawson | LB | GS | 2nd (Coaches) |
| Bray Hubbard | DB | Jr | 1st (AP, Coaches) |
HM = Honorable mention. Source:

All-SEC Freshman
| Player | Position | Class |
|---|---|---|
| Kaleb Edwards | TE | FR |
| Michael Carroll | OL | FR |
| London Simmons | DL | FR |
| Djion Lee Jr. | CB | FR |
HM = Honorable mention. Source:

NCAA Recognized All-American Honors
| Player | AP | AFCA | Athletic | Athlon | BR | CFN | CBS Sports | ESPN | FOX | FWAA | Phil Steele | TSN | SI | USAT | Walter Camp | Designation |
|---|---|---|---|---|---|---|---|---|---|---|---|---|---|---|---|---|
| Kadyn Proctor (OL, Jr.) | 2nd | 1st | -- | | | | 2nd | | | 1st | | -- | 2nd | 2nd | 1st | Consensus All-American (2025) |
| Jaeden Roberts (OL, RSr.) | -- | -- | -- | -- | | | | | | -- | -- | | -- | 2nd | -- | |
| Bray Hubbard (DB, Jr.) | 3rd | 2nd | -- | -- | | | | -- | | | | | | | | |
The NCAA recognizes a selection to all five of the AFCA, FWAA and TSN first teams for unanimous selections and three of five for consensus selections. HM = Honorable mention. Source:

== After the season ==
=== NFL draft ===
The NFL draft was held in Pittsburgh on April 23–25, 2026.

Crimson Tide who were picked in the 2026 NFL draft:

| Round | Pick | Player | Position | NFL team |
|---|---|---|---|---|
| 1 | 12 | Kadyn Proctor | OT | Miami Dolphins |
| 1 | 13 | Ty Simpson | QB | Los Angeles Rams |
| 2 | 47 | Germie Bernard | WR | Pittsburgh Steelers |
| 4 | 137 | LT Overton | DT | Dallas Cowboys |
| 5 | 146 | Parker Brailsford | C | Cleveland Browns |
| 5 | 149 | Justin Jefferson | LB | Cleveland Browns |
| 5 | 173 | Josh Cuevas | TE | Baltimore Ravens |
| 6 | 201 | Domani Jackson | CB | Green Bay Packers |
| 7 | 232 | Tim Keenan III | DT | Los Angeles Rams |
| 7 | 245 | Jam Miller | RB | New England Patriots |
