= Ty Simpson =

American football player (born 2002)

No. 15 – Los Angeles Rams
- Position: Quarterback
- Roster status: Active

Personal information
- Born: December 21, 2002 (age 23)
- Listed height: 6 ft 1 in (1.85 m)
- Listed weight: 211 lb (96 kg)

Career information
- High school: Westview (Martin, Tennessee)
- College: Alabama (2022–2025)
- NFL draft: 2026: 1st round, 13th overall pick

Career history
- Los Angeles Rams (2026–present)

Awards and highlights
- Second-team All-SEC (2025)
- Stats at Pro Football Reference

Tyler Simpson (born December 21, 2002) is an American professional football quarterback for the Los Angeles Rams of the National Football League (NFL). He played college football for the Alabama Crimson Tide and was selected by the Rams in the first round of the 2026 NFL draft.

== Early life ==
Tyler Simpson was born on December 21, 2002, and grew up in Martin, Tennessee, where he attended Westview High School. He passed for 1,888 yards and 20 touchdowns while also rushing for 311 yards and seven touchdowns as a junior. As a senior, Simpson was named the Tennessee Gatorade Player of the Year after passing for 2,827 yards and 41 touchdowns against three interceptions while rushing 92 times for 862 yards and 11 touchdowns as Westview won the 2A Tennessee State Championship. He was rated a five-star recruit and committed to play college football at Alabama after considering offers from Clemson, Ole Miss, and Tennessee.

== College career ==
Simpson joined the Alabama Crimson Tide as an early enrollee in January 2022. He made his college debut in the season opener against Utah State, completing one of two pass attempts towards the end of a 55–0 win. Simpson played in four games during his true freshman year while redshirting the season. For the next two seasons, Simpson played in six games each as backup to starting quarterback Jalen Milroe. As a redshirt freshman, Simpson completed 11 of 20 passes for 179 yards while rushing the ball 14 times for 86 yards and scoring two touchdowns. Simpson completed 14 of 25 passes for 167 yards with eight rushes for 44 yards and a TD as a redshirt sophomore. He committed no turnovers either season.

On August 11, 2025, Simpson was named the starting quarterback for the Alabama Crimson Tide for the 2025 season. He completed 305 of 473 passes for 3,567 yards, 28 touchdowns, and five interceptions on the season. He led Alabama to an 11–4 record and advanced to the 2025–26 College Football Playoff quarterfinals, losing the 2026 Rose Bowl to the Indiana Hoosiers, 38–3. On January 7, 2026, Simpson declared for the 2026 NFL draft.

=== Statistics ===
Season	Team	Games			Passing								Rushing			
Season	Team	GP	GS	Record	Comp	Att	Pct	Yards	Avg	TD	Int	Rate	Att	Yards	Avg	TD
2022	Alabama	4	0	—	4	5	80.0	35	7.0	0	0	138.8	0	0	0.0	0
2023	Alabama	6	0	—	11	20	55.0	179	8.9	0	0	130.2	14	86	6.1	2
2024	Alabama	6	0	—	14	25	56.0	167	6.7	0	0	112.1	8	44	5.5	1
2025	Alabama	15	15	11−4	305	473	64.5	3,567	7.5	28	5	145.2	90	93	1.0	2
Career		31	15	11−4	334	523	63.9	3,948	7.5	28	5	143.0	112	223	2.0	5

== Professional career ==
Pre-draft measurables
Height	Weight	Arm length	Hand span	Wingspan
6 ft 1 1/8 in (1.86 m)	211 lb (96 kg)	30 7/8 in (0.78 m)	9 3/8 in (0.24 m)	6 ft 4 1/2 in (1.94 m)
All values from NFL Combine

On April 23, 2026, the Los Angeles Rams selected Simpson in the first round, with the 13th overall pick of the 2026 NFL draft. On July 25, he signed a 4-year, $25.4 million fully guaranteed contract.

Simpson made his professional debut on August 15, 2026 during the first preseason game against the Kansas City Chiefs, where he completed 21 out of 25 passes for 190 yards and two touchdowns.

== Personal life ==
Simpson is a Christian. His father, Jason Simpson, has been the head football coach for the UT Martin Skyhawks since 2005. His younger brother, Graham, plays quarterback at Westview High and is considered a top prospect at the position within the 2028 recruiting class.
