= Ryan Coleman-Williams =

American football player (born 2007)

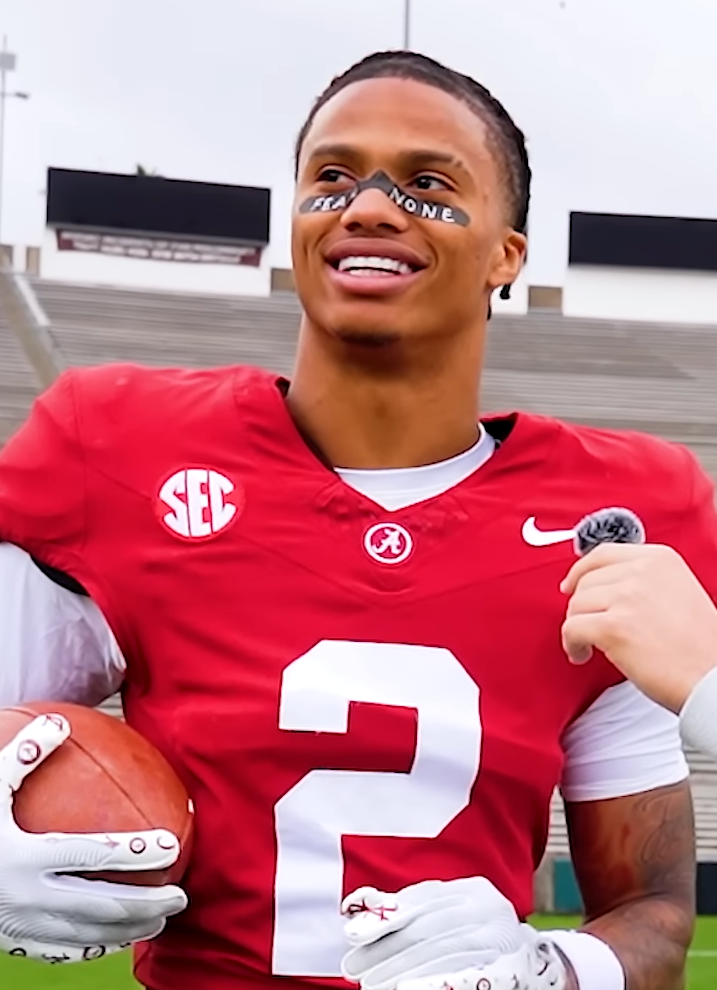
- Coleman-Williams with the Alabama Crimson Tide in 2025

No. 1 – Alabama Crimson Tide
- Position: Wide receiver
- Class: Junior

Personal information
- Born: February 9, 2007 (age 19); Mobile, Alabama, U.S.
- Listed height: 6 ft 0 in (1.83 m)
- Listed weight: 184 lb (83 kg)

Career information
- High school: Saraland (Saraland, Alabama)
- College: Alabama (2024–present)

Awards and highlights
- Second-team All-American (2024); Freshman All-American (2024); First-team All-SEC (2024)
- Stats at ESPN

Ryan Alexander Coleman-Williams Jr. (né Williams; born February 9, 2007) is an American college football wide receiver for the Alabama Crimson Tide.

== Early life ==
Williams was born on February 9, 2007, in Mobile, Alabama, later attending Saraland High School in Saraland, Alabama. He had 88 receptions for 1,641 yards with 24 touchdowns as a sophomore in 2022 and 72 receptions for 1,324 yards with 19 touchdowns as a junior in 2023. He was named the Alabama Gatorade Football Player of the Year and the Alabama Mr. Football both those years, becoming the first two time Alabama Mr. Football winner, and the first sophomore to win the award. A five-star recruit, Williams reclassified from the 2025 recruiting class to the 2024 class. He played in the 2024 Under Armour All-America Game, where he had a touchdown reception. He committed to the University of Alabama to play college football.

== College career ==
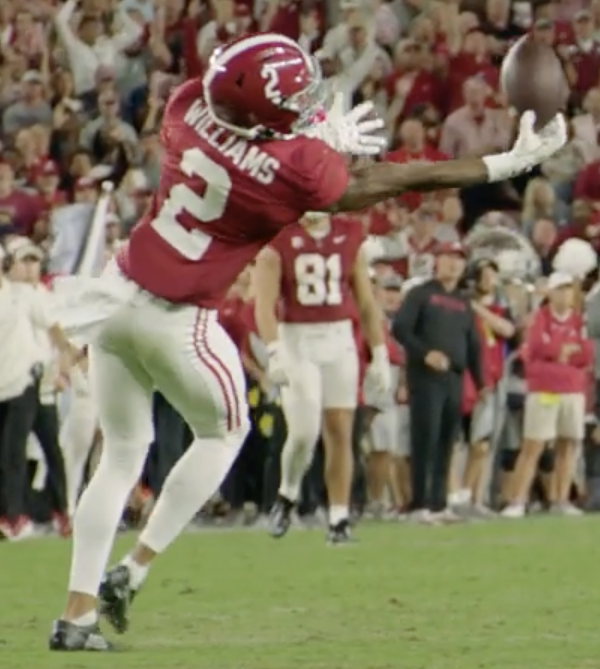
Coleman-Williams makes a one-handed catch against Georgia.

Williams made his first college start in week one of the 2024 season at age 17, making him one of the youngest players in FBS football. He earned SEC Freshman of the Week honors for his debut performance against Western Kentucky, catching two passes for 139 yards and two touchdowns in the 63–0 victory. Against No. 2 ranked Georgia, Williams caught six passes for 177 yards, including the game-winning 75-yard touchdown in the fourth quarter to lead the Crimson Tide to a 41–34 victory. As a freshman, he finished with 48 receptions for 865 yards and eight touchdowns.

=== Statistics ===
Year	Team	Games		Receiving				Rushing			
Year	Team	GP	GS	Rec	Yds	Avg	TD	Att	Yds	Avg	TD
2024	Alabama	13	13	48	865	18.0	8	4	48	12.0	2
2025	Alabama	14	12	49	689	14.1	4	2	21	10.5	0
2026	Alabama	6	6	23	415	18.0	4	2	13	6.5	0
Career		33	31	120	1,969	16.4	16	8	82	10.3	2

== Personal life ==
Williams was one of the cover athletes for EA Sports College Football 26 alongside Jeremiah Smith.

In March 2026, he changed his last name from Williams to Coleman-Williams to honor his mother.
