= Germie Bernard =

American football player (born 2003)

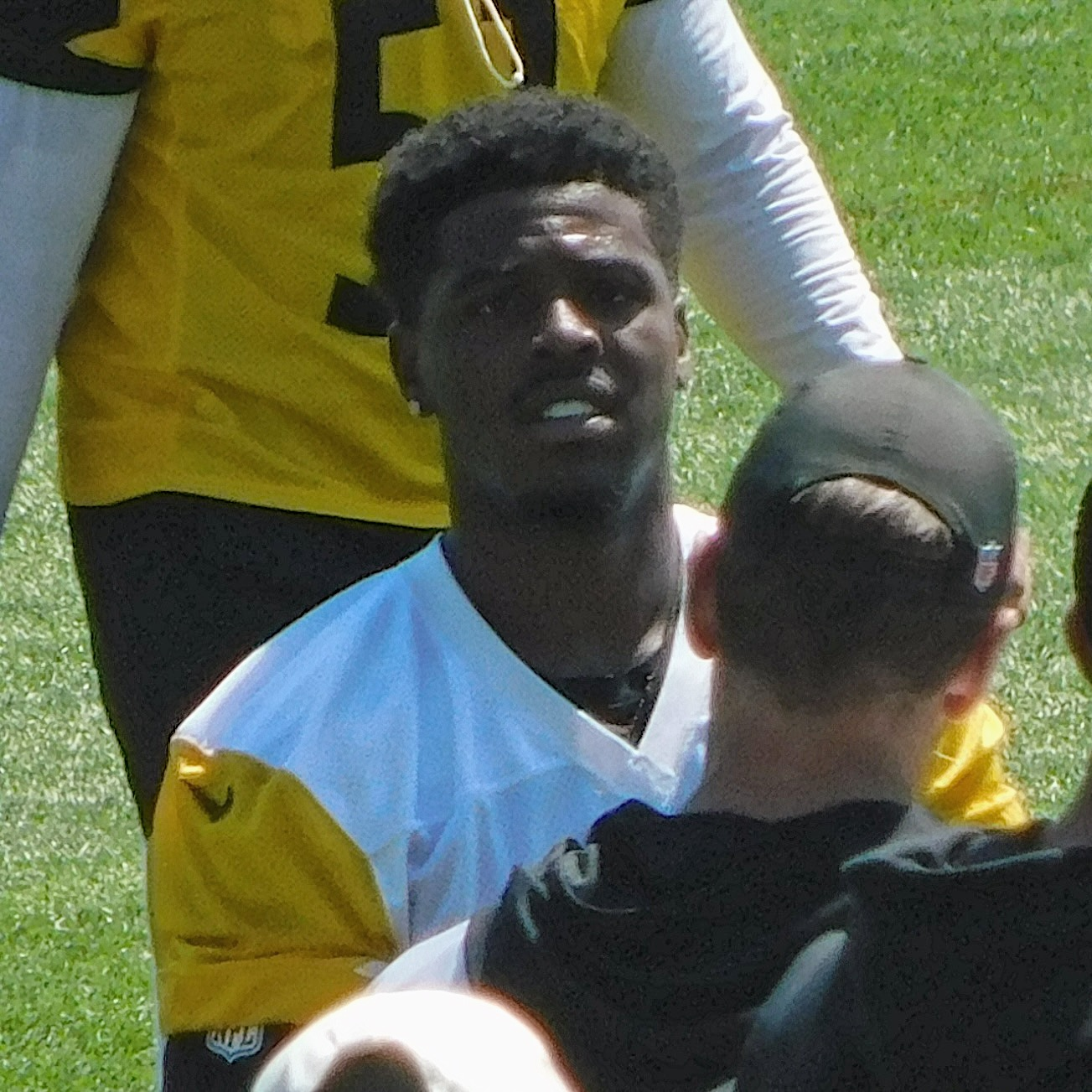
- Bernard with the Pittsburgh Steelers in 2026

No. 17 – Pittsburgh Steelers
- Position: Wide receiver
- Roster status: Active

Personal information
- Born: December 2, 2003 (age 22); Las Vegas, Nevada, U.S.
- Listed height: 6 ft 1 in (1.85 m)
- Listed weight: 206 lb (93 kg)

Career information
- High school: Liberty (Henderson, Nevada)
- College: Michigan State (2022); Washington (2023); Alabama (2024–2025)
- NFL draft: 2026: 2nd round, 47th overall pick

Career history
- Pittsburgh Steelers (2026–present)

Career NFL statistics as of Week 10, 2026
- Receptions: 32
- Receiving yards: 284
- Receiving touchdowns: 1
- Stats at Pro Football Reference

Germie Bernard (born December 2, 2003) is an American professional football wide receiver for the Pittsburgh Steelers of the National Football League (NFL). He played college football for the Michigan State Spartans, Washington Huskies, and Alabama Crimson Tide. Bernard was selected by the Steelers in the second round of the 2026 NFL draft.

== Early life ==
Bernard was born on December 2, 2003, in Las Vegas, Nevada. He attended Liberty High School in Henderson, Nevada. He had a breakout sophomore season, tallying 948 yards and 14 touchdowns. In his senior season, Bernard totaled 53 receptions for 956 yards and 12 touchdowns. Bernard initially committed to play college football for the Washington Huskies before flipping his commitment to the Michigan State Spartans.

== College career ==
=== Michigan State ===
In week 6 of the 2022 season, Bernard hauled in three receptions for 28 yards against Ohio State. He finished his first collegiate season making seven catches for 128 yards and two touchdowns. After the season, Bernard entered the NCAA transfer portal.

=== Washington ===
Bernard transferred to play with the Washington Huskies. In week 2 of the 2023 season, he recorded his first touchdown as a Husky in a win over Tulsa. In week 5, Bernard led the Huskies in receiving bringing in eight receptions for 98 yards, while also adding a touchdown on the ground, as he helped Washington beat Arizona. On January 15, 2024, he announced that he would be entering the transfer portal.

=== Alabama ===
On January 21, 2024, Bernard announced that he would be transferring to Alabama.

=== College statistics ===
Year	Team	GP	Receiving				Rushing		
Year	Team	GP	Rec	Yds	Avg	TD	Att	Yds	TD
2022	Michigan State	5	7	128	18.3	2	1	3	0
2023	Washington	11	34	419	12.3	2	13	43	2
2024	Alabama	13	50	794	15.9	2	4	37	1
2025	Alabama	14	64	862	13.5	7	18	101	2
Career		39	155	2,203	14.2	13	36	184	5

== Professional career ==
Pre-draft measurables
Height	Weight	Arm length	Hand span	Wingspan	40-yard dash	10-yard split	20-yard split	20-yard shuttle	Three-cone drill	Vertical jump	Broad jump
6 ft 1 1/4 in (1.86 m)	206 lb (93 kg)	30 3/8 in (0.77 m)	9 7/8 in (0.25 m)	6 ft 2 7/8 in (1.90 m)	4.48 s	1.52 s	2.58 s	4.31 s	6.71 s	32.5 in (0.83 m)	10 ft 5 in (3.18 m)
All values from NFL Combine

=== Pittsburgh Steelers ===
==== 2026 ====
Bernard with the Steelers in 2026

Bernard was drafted by the Pittsburgh Steelers in the second round with the 47th pick in the 2026 NFL Draft. On May 18, 2026, Bernard signed a four-year deal with the Steelers. Bernard entered his rookie season as part of a receiving corps featuring DK Metcalf and Michael Pittman Jr. After seeing limited offensive opportunities during the opening weeks of the season, Bernard gradually earned a larger role in the Steelers' offense. In Week 5 against the Indianapolis Colts, Bernard recorded six receptions for 80 receiving yards, setting career highs in both categories. He also contributed a four-yard rush as the Steelers dealt with injuries to several receivers. His performance drew praise from quarterback Aaron Rodgers and head coach Mike McCarthy, who highlighted his development and versatility.

In Week 6 against the Tampa Bay Buccaneers, Bernard recorded 11 receptions for 87 receiving yards and his first career receiving touchdown. Through his first six regular-season games, Bernard accumulated 24 receptions for 227 receiving yards and one touchdown, emerging as an increasingly important contributor to Pittsburgh's passing offense.
