= EA Sports College Football 26 =

2025 video game

- Standard edition cover art featuring Ryan Coleman-Williams and Jeremiah Smith
- Developer: EA Orlando
- Publisher: EA Sports
- Series: EA Sports College Football
- Engine: Frostbite
- Platforms: PlayStation 5 Xbox Series X/S
- Release: July 10, 2025
- Genre: Sports
- Modes: Single-player, multiplayer

EA Sports College Football 26 is a video game based on college football, developed by EA Orlando and published by EA Sports. It is a part of the EA Sports College Football game series, following the return of the series with EA Sports College Football 25 in 2024.

EA Sports College Football 26 was released on July 10, 2025. With Delaware and Missouri State joining the FBS level, they were added to the game upon release. The cover athletes are Alabama's Ryan Coleman-Williams and Ohio State's Jeremiah Smith, both wide receivers.

== Gameplay ==
EA Sports College Football 26 introduced expanded gameplay systems aimed at improving realism and variety. The game features over 2,800 new plays and more than 45 additional formations, representing one of the largest playbook expansions in the series. It also includes over 10,000 players and more than 300 real-world coaches, each with distinct schemes and strategies. Enhancements to substitution mechanics and in-game adjustments allow for more dynamic decision-making, reflecting real college football gameplay. These additions were intended to increase authenticity and provide a broader range of play styles for users.

== Soundtrack ==
The College Football 26 soundtrack consists of marching band covers of college fight songs credited to the EA Sports College Football Marching Band, as well as drum cadences recorded by the EA Sports College Football Drumline, and marching band covers of popular music. The "Campus Clash" main theme by Kris Bowers was recorded by the Auburn University Marching Band for the game's soundtrack.

== Reception ==
Reception

Aggregate score
Aggregator	Score
Metacritic	(PS5) 82/100 (XSXS) 82/100

Review scores
Publication	Score
Game Informer	8.5/10
GameSpot	8/10
GamesRadar+	4.5/5 stars
IGN	7/10
Shacknews	8/10

EA Sports College Football 26 received "generally favorable" reviews from critics according to review aggregator website Metacritic.
