= EA Sports College Football Marching Band =

The EA Sports College marching band are the primary musicians responsible for the EA Sports College Football series soundtracks. The group consists of musicians from colleges all around the United States, including Auburn, the Blair School of Music, the University of South Carolina, and other marching bands.The band's director is Dr. Corey Spurlin, with Torsten Sales as the feature Producer, Kris Bowers as composer, Nick Spezia as recording engineer, and Ward Miller as the band arranger. The band has produced covers of various songs, including works by Sabrina Carpenter, Lil Nas X, Charli XCX, and Halsey.

== Competitions ==
EA SPORTS partnered with Metallica for the second year of the For Whom The Bell Tolls competition in order to select a marching band to produce the game's main theme. The University of South Carolina won the 2026 competition, and produced the theme "Campus Clash" for EA Sports College Football 27. The EA Sports College Football 26 "Campus Clash" theme was produced by Auburn University.
