= Tim Keenan III =

American football player (born 2002)

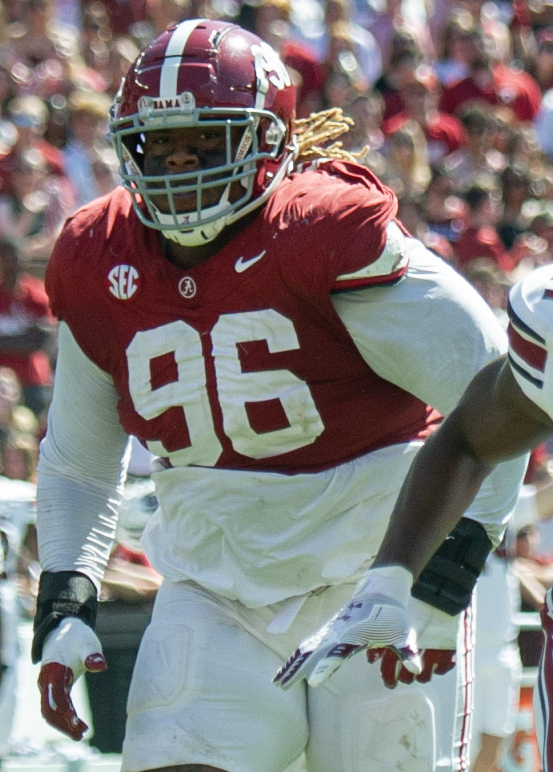
- Keenan III with the Alabama Crimson Tide in 2024

No. 91 – Las Vegas Raiders
- Position: Defensive tackle
- Roster status: Active

Personal information
- Born: December 9, 2002 (age 23)
- Listed height: 6 ft 1 in (1.85 m)
- Listed weight: 327 lb (148 kg)

Career information
- High school: Ramsay (Birmingham, Alabama)
- College: Alabama (2021–2025)
- NFL draft: 2026: 7th round, 232nd overall pick

Career history
- Los Angeles Rams (2026)*; Las Vegas Raiders (2026–present)
- * Offseason or practice squad member only

Career NFL statistics as of Week 8, 2026
- Total tackles: 3
- Sacks: 1.0
- Stats at Pro Football Reference

Timothy Keenan III (born December 9, 2002) is an American professional football defensive tackle for the Las Vegas Raiders of the National Football League (NFL). He played college football for the Alabama Crimson Tide and was selected by the Los Angeles Rams in the seventh round of the 2026 NFL draft.

== Early life ==
Keenan III was born on December 9, 2002. attended Ramsay High School in Birmingham, Alabama. He led the Rams to a 10–3 record and an Alabama 5A Region state quarterfinal appearance as a junior, then improved to a 12–2 mark and a runner-up finish in the 5A Region as a senior in 2020. He committed to the University of Alabama to play college football.

== College career ==
Keenan III redshirted his first year at Alabama in 2021 and played in two games in 2022. As a redshirt sophomore in 2023, he played in 14 games and had 38 tackles and one sack. As a redshirt junior in 2024, he started 12 of 13 games and recorded 40 tackles and 2.5 sacks. Keenan III returned to Alabama for his senior year in 2025. After missing the first three games due to an ankle injury, Keenan started 12 straight games to end the season, totaling 16 stops, including three tackles for loss and two sacks, while also adding two fumble recoveries, a forced fumble, one pass breakup and a blocked punt.

== Professional career ==
Pre-draft measurables
Height	Weight	Arm length	Hand span	Wingspan	40-yard dash	10-yard split	20-yard split	Vertical jump	Broad jump	Bench press
6 ft 1 in (1.85 m)	327 lb (148 kg)	30 1/2 in (0.77 m)	8 5/8 in (0.22 m)	6 ft 5 in (1.96 m)	5.31 s	1.83 s	3.06 s	30.0 in (0.76 m)	8 ft 4 in (2.54 m)	21 reps
All values from NFL Combine

=== Los Angeles Rams ===
On April 25, 2026, Keenan was drafted by the Los Angeles Rams in the seventh round (232nd overall) of the 2026 NFL draft. On August 30, Keenan was waived by Los Angeles as a part of final roster cuts; he was re-signed to the team's practice squad the following day. On September 3, he was terminated from the practice squad.

=== Las Vegas Raiders ===
On September 7, 2026, Keenan was signed to the Las Vegas Raiders' practice squad. On November 11, he was signed to the active roster.
