= Josh Cuevas =

American football player (born 2003)

No. 85 – Baltimore Ravens
- Position: Tight end
- Roster status: Active

Personal information
- Born: September 15, 2003 (age 23); Burbank, California, U.S.
- Listed height: 6 ft 3 in (1.91 m)
- Listed weight: 246 lb (112 kg)

Career information
- High school: Campbell Hall (Los Angeles, California)
- College: Cal Poly (2021–2022); Washington (2023); Alabama (2024–2025)
- NFL draft: 2026: 5th round, 173rd overall pick

Career history
- Baltimore Ravens (2026–present)

Career NFL statistics as of Week 5, 2026
- Receptions: 3
- Receiving yards: 40
- Stats at Pro Football Reference

Joshua Cuevas (born September 15, 2003) is an American professional football tight end for the Baltimore Ravens of the National Football League (NFL). He played college football for the Cal Poly Mustangs, the Washington Huskies, and the Alabama Crimson Tide. Cuevas was selected by the Ravens in the fifth round of the 2026 NFL draft.

== Early life ==
Cuevas attended Campbell Hall School in Los Angeles, California. He committed to play college football for the Cal Poly Mustangs.

== College career ==
As a freshman in 2021, Cuevas caught four passes for 56 yards in three games and was redshirted. In 2022, he recorded 58 receptions for 678 yards and six touchdowns. After the season, Cuevas entered his name into the NCAA transfer portal.

Cuevas transferred to play for the Washington Huskies. In 2023, he caught four passes for 164 yards and a touchdown. After the season, Cuevas once again entered his name into the transfer portal.

Cuevas transferred to play for the Alabama Crimson Tide. In 2024, he caught 16 passes for 218 yards and a touchdown. In the 2025 season opener, Cuevas recorded three receptions for 31 yards and a touchdown in a loss to Florida State.

== Professional career ==
Pre-draft measurables
Height	Weight	Arm length	Hand span	Wingspan	40-yard dash	10-yard split	20-yard split	20-yard shuttle	Three-cone drill	Vertical jump	Broad jump	Bench press
6 ft 3 3/8 in (1.91 m)	245 lb (111 kg)	30 5/8 in (0.78 m)	9 5/8 in (0.24 m)	6 ft 5 1/8 in (1.96 m)	4.65 s	1.65 s	2.70 s	4.38 s	7.37 s	34.0 in (0.86 m)	9 ft 10 in (3.00 m)	19 reps
All values from NFL Combine/Pro Day

Cuevas was selected by the Baltimore Ravens with the 173rd overall pick in the fifth round of the 2026 NFL Draft.

In a week six loss to the Cleveland Browns, Cuevas recorded 4 catches for 44 yards, including a touchdown pass from backup quarterback Tyler Huntley.
