= Ivan Taylor =

American football player

No. 13 – Alabama Crimson Tide
- Position: Safety
- Class: Sophomore

Personal information
- Listed height: 6 ft 0 in (1.83 m)
- Listed weight: 198 lb (90 kg)

Career information
- High school: West Orange (Winter Garden, Florida)
- College: Alabama (2025–present)
- Stats at ESPN

Ivan Taylor is an American college football safety for the Alabama Crimson Tide.

== Early life ==
Taylor attended West Orange High School in Winter Garden, Florida. A four-star recruit, he originally committed to play college football at the University of Notre Dame and the University of Michigan before ultimately choosing the University of Alabama.

== College career ==
As a freshman at Alabama in 2025, Taylor played in all 15 games and had 14 tackles.

== Personal life ==
His father, Ike Taylor, played 12 seasons in the NFL for the Pittsburgh Steelers. He earned more playing time his sophomore year in 2026.
