= Justin Jefferson (linebacker) =

American football player (born 2003)

No. 17 – Cleveland Browns
- Position: Linebacker
- Roster status: Active

Personal information
- Born: March 20, 2003 (age 23)
- Listed height: 6 ft 0 in (1.83 m)
- Listed weight: 223 lb (101 kg)

Career information
- High school: Bartlett (Bartlett, Tennessee)
- College: Pearl River Community College (2021–2022); Alabama (2023–2025)
- NFL draft: 2026: 5th round, 149th overall pick

Career history
- Cleveland Browns (2026–present)
- Stats at Pro Football Reference

Justin Jefferson (born March 20, 2003) is an American professional football linebacker for the Cleveland Browns of the National Football League (NFL). He played college football for Pearl River Community College and the Alabama Crimson Tide and was selected by the Browns in the fifth round of the 2026 NFL draft.

== Early life ==
Jefferson attended Bartlett High School in Bartlett, Tennessee. As a senior he had 116 tackles and two interceptions.

== College career ==
Jefferson spent two years at Pearl River Community College, recording 57 tackles and three sacks as a freshman and 86 tackles, two sacks and an interception as a sophomore. One of the top JUCO players in the 2023 class, he transferred to the University of Alabama.

Jefferson played in 14 games his first year at Alabama in 2023, recording four tackles. He played in 12 games with three starts in 2024 and had 61 tackles and two sacks. He was granted another year of eligibility in 2025 and entered the season as a starter.

== Professional career ==
Pre-draft measurables
Height	Weight	Arm length	Hand span	Wingspan	40-yard dash	10-yard split	20-yard split	20-yard shuttle	Three-cone drill	Vertical jump	Broad jump
6 ft 0 3/8 in (1.84 m)	223 lb (101 kg)	31 3/4 in (0.81 m)	10 in (0.25 m)	6 ft 5 3/4 in (1.97 m)	4.54 s	1.55 s	2.63 s	4.25 s	6.81 s	38.5 in (0.98 m)	10 ft 5 in (3.18 m)
All values from NFL Combine/Pro Day

The Cleveland Browns selected Jefferson in the fifth round with the 149rd overall pick in the 2026 NFL draft. The Browns acquired this selection as part of a trade that sent Joe Flacco and a 6th round pick in the draft to the Cincinnati Bengals.
