= Kaleb Edwards =

American football player (born 2007)

No. 81 – Alabama Crimson Tide
- Position: Tight end
- Class: Sophomore

Personal information
- Born: January 23, 2007 (age 19)
- Listed height: 6 ft 6 in (1.98 m)
- Listed weight: 268 lb (122 kg)

Career information
- High school: Oak Ridge (El Dorado Hills, California)
- College: Alabama (2025–present)
- Stats at ESPN

Kaleb Edwards (born January 23, 2007) is an American football tight end for the Alabama Crimson Tide.

== Early life ==
Edwards attended Oak Ridge High School in El Dorado Hills, California, where he notched 2,185 receiving yards and 23 touchdowns, while also recording 56 tackles with 12.5 for loss, and eight sacks over his career. He was named the Sierra Foothill League Defensive Player of the Year. Edwards also played basketball, scoring 988 career points and finishing second all-time in school history in rebounds. Coming out of high school, he was rated as a four-star recruit, the eight overall tight end, and the 159th overall player in the class of 2025, where he committed to play college football for the Alabama Crimson Tide over other offers from schools such as Texas, UCLA, Washington, Auburn, and Oregon.

== College career ==
In week 2 of the 2025 season, Edwards hauled in a six-yard pass for his first career touchdown in a win over Louisiana–Monroe. In week 12, he brought in a 25-yard reception in a 23–21 loss against Oklahoma. In the 2025 SEC Championship Game, Edwards got the start, where he brought in three passes for 42 yards in a loss versus Georgia. For his performance during the 2025 season, he was named to the SEC all-freshman team.
