= College Football Comeback Player of the Year Award =

College football award

Comeback Player of the Year Award
- Awarded for: Given to three college football student-athletes for overcoming injury, illness or other circumstances.
- Location: Glendale, Arizona
- Country: United States
- Presented by: College Sports Communicators, Associated Press, Fiesta Bowl Committee (2018–present)

History
- First award: 2018
- Most recent: Liberty safety Christian Bodner; South Florida quarterback Byrum Brown; and Boston College linebacker Bryce Steele
- Website: https://comeback-player.com/

The College Football Comeback Player of the Year Award recognizes college football student-athletes for overcoming injury, illness or other circumstances. The award was established in 2018 and honors three student-athletes each year, as voted on by a panel of Associated Press college football writers and sports information directors.

== Winners ==
Year	Player	Position	School	Ref.
2018	Antwan Dixon	WR	Kent State	
2018	Seth Simmer	DT	Dartmouth	
2018	Antonio Wimbush	RB	Carson–Newman	
2019	Jake Luton	QB	Oregon State	
2019	Drew Wilson	OL	Georgia Southern	
2019	Octavion Wilson	WR	Salisbury	
2020	Jarek Broussard	RB	Colorado	
2020	Kenneth Horsey	OG	Kentucky	
2020	Silas Kelly	LB	Coastal Carolina	
2021	Aidan Hutchinson	DE	Michigan	
2021	McKenzie Milton	QB	Florida State	
2021	J. J. Weaver	LB	Kentucky	
2022	Mohamed Ibrahim	RB	Minnesota	
2022	Laiatu Latu	DE	UCLA	
2022	Michael Penix Jr.	QB	Washington	
2023	Blake Corum	RB	Michigan	
2023	Jacob Dobbs	LB	Holy Cross	
2023	Mike Hollins	RB	Virginia	
2024	Ike Larsen	S	Utah State	
2024	Raheim Sanders	RB	South Carolina	
2024	Tyler Shough	QB	Louisville	
2025	Christian Bodnar	S	Liberty	
2025	Byrum Brown	QB	South Florida	
2025	Bryce Steele	LB	Boston College	
