= LT Overton =

American football player (born 2004)

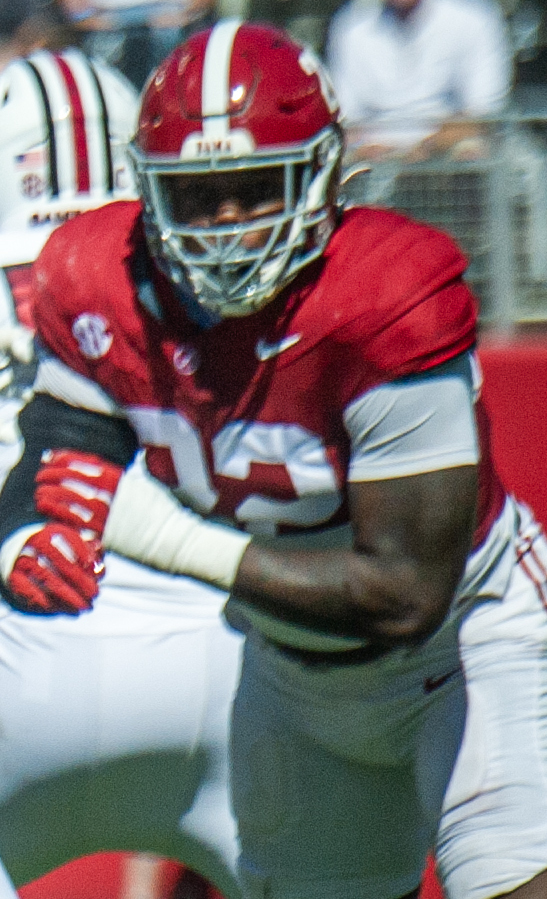
- Overton with the Alabama Crimson Tide in 2024

No. 99 – Dallas Cowboys
- Position: Defensive end
- Roster status: Active

Personal information
- Born: October 11, 2004 (age 22); College Station, Texas, U.S.
- Listed height: 6 ft 3 in (1.91 m)
- Listed weight: 274 lb (124 kg)

Career information
- High school: Milton (Milton, Georgia)
- College: Texas A&M (2022–2023); Alabama (2024–2025)
- NFL draft: 2026: 4th round, 137th overall pick

Career history
- Dallas Cowboys (2026–present)

Career NFL statistics as of Week 4, 2026
- Tackles: 6
- Pass deflections: 1
- Stats at Pro Football Reference

Lebbeus Thomas Overton (born October 11, 2004) is an American professional football defensive end for the Dallas Cowboys of the National Football League (NFL). He played college football for the Texas A&M Aggies and the Alabama Crimson Tide and was selected by the Cowboys in the fourth round of the 2026 NFL draft.

== Early life ==
Overton was born on October 11, 2004, in College Station, Texas. He attended Bessemer Academy in Bessemer, Alabama as a freshman and graduated from Milton High School in Milton, Georgia. A five-star recruit, he reclassified from the 2023 to 2022 class. He was selected to play in the 2022 Under Armour All-American Game. He committed to Texas A&M University to play college football. Overton also played basketball in high school.

== College career ==
Overton played at Texas A&M in 2022 and 2023. In 23 games, he had 48 tackles and one sack. After the 2023 he entered the transfer portal and transferred to the University of Alabama. He was a starter his first year at Alabama in 2024.

== Professional career ==
Pre-draft measurables
Height	Weight	Arm length	Hand span	Wingspan	40-yard dash	10-yard split	20-yard split	20-yard shuttle	Three-cone drill	Vertical jump	Broad jump
6 ft 3 in (1.91 m)	274 lb (124 kg)	33 1/4 in (0.84 m)	10 5/8 in (0.27 m)	6 ft 9 3/8 in (2.07 m)	4.87 s	1.70 s	2.84 s	4.75 s	7.61 s	26.0 in (0.66 m)	9 ft 0 in (2.74 m)
All values from NFL Combine/Pro Day

Overton was selected by the Dallas Cowboys in the fourth round with the 137th overall pick in the 2026 NFL draft.

== Personal life ==
Oveton's mother, Eunice Thomas, was a stand-out volleyball player for the University of Kentucky. His father, Milton Overton played college football at Oklahoma and is the current athletic director at Kennesaw State University.
