= Parker Brailsford =

American football player (born 2003)

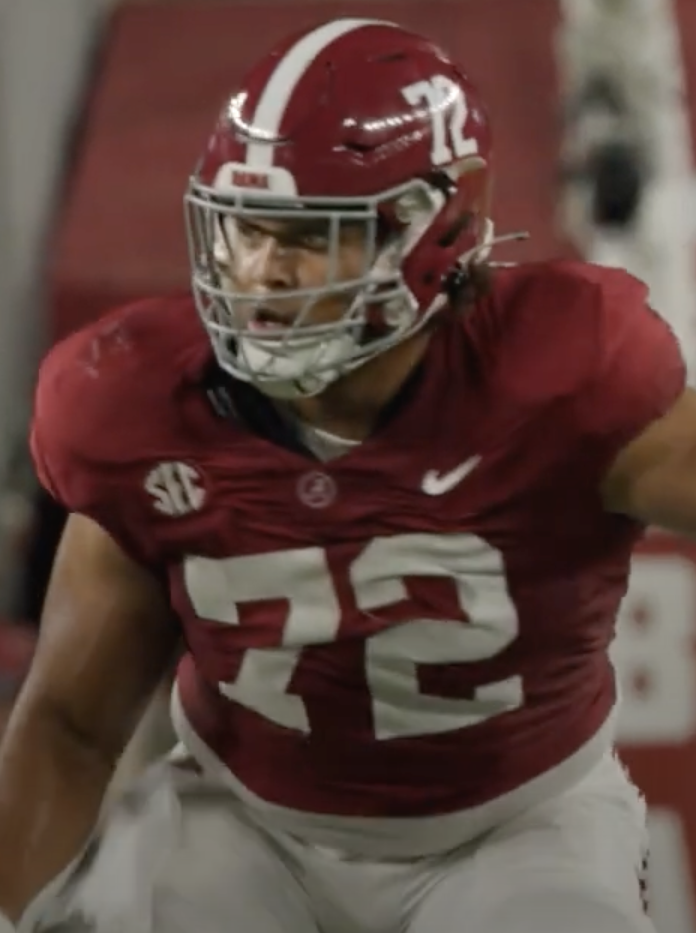
- Brailsford with Alabama in 2024

No. 52 – Cleveland Browns
- Position: Center
- Roster status: Active

Personal information
- Born: October 20, 2003 (age 23)
- Listed height: 6 ft 2 in (1.88 m)
- Listed weight: 290 lb (132 kg)

Career information
- High school: Saguaro (Scottsdale, Arizona)
- College: Washington (2022–2023); Alabama (2024–2025)
- NFL draft: 2026: 5th round, 146th overall pick

Career history
- Cleveland Browns (2026–present)

Awards and highlights
- Second-team All-Pac-12 (2023); Third-team All-SEC (2025)
- Stats at Pro Football Reference

Parker Brailsford (born October 20, 2003) is an American professional football center for the Cleveland Browns of the National Football League (NFL). He played college football for the Washington Huskies and the Alabama Crimson Tide and was selected by the Browns in the fifth round of the 2026 NFL draft.

== Early life ==
Brailsford grew up in Scottsdale, Arizona and attended Saguaro High School where he lettered in football and track and field. Brailsford committed to play college football for the Washington Huskies.

== College career ==
=== Washington ===
After taking a redshirt in 2022, Brailsford earned a starting spot on the Huskies offensive line ahead of the 2023 season. In week three, he was named the Pac-12 freshman of the week for his performance against Michigan State. In week ten, Brailsford was named the Pac-12 Conference offensive lineman of the week. For his performance on the season, he was named second-team all-Pac-12. Brailsford led the Huskies offensive line that won the Joe Moore Award, awarded to the nation's top offensive line. After the season, he entered the NCAA transfer portal.

=== Alabama ===
On January 21, 2024, Brailsford announced that he would be transferring to Alabama.

== Professional career ==
Pre-draft measurables
Height	Weight	Arm length	Hand span	Wingspan	40-yard dash	10-yard split	20-yard split	20-yard shuttle	Vertical jump	Broad jump	Bench press
6 ft 1 7/8 in (1.88 m)	289 lb (131 kg)	32 in (0.81 m)	9 1/2 in (0.24 m)	6 ft 8 3/4 in (2.05 m)	4.95 s	1.70 s	2.84 s	4.72 s	32.5 in (0.83 m)	9 ft 10 in (3.00 m)	27 reps
All values from NFL Combine/Pro Day

Brailsford was drafted by the Cleveland Browns in the fifth round, 146 overall pick in the 2026 NFL draft.
