= Dijon Lee =

American football player (born 2006)

Dijon Lee Jr.
No. 5 – Alabama Crimson Tide
- Position: Cornerback
- Class: Sophomore

Personal information
- Born: February 13, 2006 (age 20)
- Listed height: 6 ft 4 in (1.93 m)
- Listed weight: 204 lb (93 kg)

Career information
- High school: Mission Viejo (Mission Viejo, California)
- College: Alabama (2025–present)

Dijon Lee Jr. (born February 13, 2006) is an American college football cornerback for the Alabama Crimson Tide. He was a five-star recruit and one of the top prospects in the class of 2025.

== Early life ==
Lee is from Carson, California. He attended Mission Viejo High School, where he competed in both football and track and field. As a junior with the football team, Lee, a cornerback, recorded 55 tackles, 13 pass breakups and two interceptions. He contributed to Mission Viejo winning the CIF Division 1-AA championship in 2023. As a senior in 2024, he totaled 52 tackles, four interceptions and two pass breakups. He finished with 139 tackles, eight interceptions and 18 pass deflections across his last three seasons at Mission Viejo.

Lee was highly recruited, being a five-star recruit and ranked among the top 20 players nationally by several publications; 247Sports ranked him the third-best cornerback in the recruiting class of 2025 as well as the 15th-best player overall. He committed to play college football for the Alabama Crimson Tide.

== College career ==
Lee enrolled at Alabama in 2025 and impressed in spring practices.
