= 2026 Alabama Crimson Tide football team =

American college football season

2026 Alabama Crimson Tide football
- Conference: Southeastern Conference

Ranking
- Coaches: No. 5
- AP: No. 6
- CFP: No. 3
- Record: 9–2 (6–2 SEC)
- Head coach: Kalen DeBoer (3rd season)
- Offensive coordinator: Ryan Grubb (2nd season)
- Offensive scheme: Run and Gun
- Defensive coordinator: Kane Wommack (3rd season)
- Co-defensive coordinator: Maurice Linguist (3rd season)
- Base defense: 4–2–5, Swarm
- Home stadium: Saban Field at Bryant–Denny Stadium

2026 Southeastern Conference football standings
	Conf.			Overall
Team	W		L	W		L
No. 1 Georgia y	8	–	1	10	–	1
No. 5 Texas	6	–	2	9	–	2
No. 9 Tennessee	6	–	2	9	–	2
No. 3 Alabama	6	–	2	9	–	2
No. 22 Oklahoma	5	–	3	7	–	4
No. 24 Florida	5	–	4	7	–	4
No. 16 Kentucky	5	–	4	7	–	4
No. 25 Ole Miss	4	–	4	7	–	4
Auburn	4	–	4	7	–	4
Missouri	4	–	4	7	–	4
No. 21 South Carolina	4	–	5	6	–	5
LSU	3	–	5	6	–	5
Mississippi State	2	–	6	5	–	6
Arkansas	2	–	6	4	–	7
Texas A&M	1	–	7	4	–	7
Vanderbilt	1	–	7	4	–	7
Championship: Georgia vs TBD
^ – College Football Playoff participant; $ – Conference champion; y – Championship game participant; As of November 22, 2026; Rankings from CFP rankings

The 2026 Alabama Crimson Tide football team represents the University of Alabama during the 2026 NCAA Division I FBS football season. The season is the Crimson Tide's 132nd overall season, and 93rd as a member of the Southeastern Conference (SEC). The Crimson Tide play their home games on Saban Field at Bryant–Denny Stadium located in Tuscaloosa, Alabama, under third year coach Kalen DeBoer.

== Offseason ==
Positions key
Offense	Defense	Special teams
QB — Quarterback; RB — Running back; FB — Fullback; WR — Wide receiver; TE — Tight end; OL — Offensive lineman; T — Tackle; G — Guard; C — Center	DL — Defensive lineman; DT — Defensive tackle (Note: Includes nose tackle (NT)); DE — Defensive end; EDGE — Edge rusher; LB — Linebacker (Note: Includes middle linebacker (MLB/MIKE), weakside linebacker (WILL), strongside linebacker (SAM), off-ball linebacker, and outside linebacker (OLB)); DB — Defensive back; CB — Cornerback; S — Safety (Note: Includes free safety (FS) and strong safety (SS))	K — Kicker (Note: Also known as a placekicker (PK)); P — Punter; LS — Long snapper; RS — Return specialist (Note: Includes kickoff and punt returners)

=== Entered NFL draft ===
The deadline for players to declare for the NFL draft was January 2026.

10 Alabama players were drafted in 2026.

Player	Position	Round	Pick	Drafted by
Kadyn Proctor	OT	1	12	Miami Dolphins
Ty Simpson	QB	1	13	Los Angeles Rams
Germie Bernard	WR	2	47	Pittsburgh Steelers
LT Overton	DT	4	137	Dallas Cowboys
Parker Brailsford	C	5	146	Cleveland Browns
Justin Jefferson	LB	5	149	Cleveland Browns
Josh Cuevas	TE	5	173	Baltimore Ravens
Domani Jackson	CB	6	201	Green Bay Packers
Tim Keenan III	DT	7	232	Los Angeles Rams
Jam Miller	RB	7	245	New England Patriots

=== Total picks by school ===
Team	Round 1	Round 2	Round 3	Round 4	Round 5	Round 6	Round 7	Total
Alabama	2	1	0	1	3	1	2	10

=== Departures ===
Over the course of the off-season, Alabama lost 50 total players. 22 players in transfer portal, 13 players graduated, 16 players declared for the 2026 NFL draft.

2026 Alabama offseason departures
Name	Pos.	Height	Weight	Year	Hometown	Notes
Germie Bernard	WR	6'1	203	Senior	Las Vegas, NV	Declared by 2026 NFL Draft
Domani Jackson	DB	6'1	190	(redshirt) Senior	Santa Ana, CA	Declared by 2026 NFL Draft
Deontae Lawson	LB	6'2	230	(redshirt) Senior	Mobile, AL	Declared by 2026 NFL Draft
Justin Jefferson	LB	6'6	220	(redshirt) Senior	Memphis, TN	Declared by 2026 NFL Draft
Nikhai Hill-Green	LB	6'2	230	Graduated Student	Baltimore, MD	Declared by 2026 NFL Draft
LT Overton	DL	6′3	265	Senior	College Station, TX	Declared by 2026 NFL Draft
Jam Miller	RB	5'10	211	Senior	Tyler, TX	Declared by 2026 NFL Draft
Jaeden Roberts	OL	6'5	316	(redshirt) Senior	Houston, TX	Declared by 2026 NFL Draft
Tim Keenan III	DL	6'2	315	(redshirt) Senior	Birmingham, AL	Declared by 2026 NFL Draft
DaShawn Jones	DB	6'0	181	(redshirt) Senior	Baltimore, MD	Declared by 2026 NFL Draft
Peyton Yates	DB	5'10	180	Senior	Eads, TN	Graduated
Reid Schuback	K	6'0	185	Senior	Poway, CA	Graduated
JD Baird	LB	5'8	190	Senior	Tuscaloosa, AL	Graduated
Gene VanDeMark	OL	6'0	185	(redshirt) Senior	Lodi, NJ	Graduated
Kam Dewberry	OL	6'4	330	Senior	Humble, TX	Declared by 2026 NFL Draft
Blake Doud	P	6'5	215	(redshirt) Senior	Parker, CO	Graduated
Alex Rozier	LS	6'4	220	Senior	Hattiesburg, MS	Graduated
Peyton Fox	TE	6'4	225	Senior	Pelham, AL	Graduated
Peter Knudson	TE	6'4	240	Senior	McCall, ID	Graduated
Brody Dalton	TE	6'5	250	Senior	Fyffe, AL	Graduated
Cade Carruth	QB	6'1	195	Senior	Trussville, AL	Graduated
Jay Loper Jr.	WR	5'11	180	Senior	Daphne, AL	Graduated
Dre Washington	RB	5'9	218	Senior	Hemphill, TX	Declared by 2026 NFL Draft
Michael Lorino III	RB	6'0	185	Senior	Birmingham, AL	Graduated
Ty Simpson	QB	6'2	203	(redshirt) Senior	Martin, TN	Declared by 2026 NFL Draft
Kadyn Proctor	OL	6'7	360	Junior	Des Moines, IA	Declared by 2026 NFL Draft
Parker Brailsford	OL	6'2	275	(redshirt) Junior	Mesa, AZ	Declared by 2026 NFL Draft
Josh Cuevas	TE	6'3	239	(redshirt) Senior	Los Angeles, CA	Declared by 2026 NFL Draft

=== Transfer portal ===
==== Outgoing transfers ====
Twenty-two Alabama players elected to enter the NCAA Transfer Portal during or after the 2025 season.

Name	No.	Pos.	Height	Weight	Hometown	Class	New school
Bubba Hampton	6	WR	5'10	175	Daingerfield, TX	(redshirt) Freshman	Oregon State
Kameron Howard	6	DB	5'11	189	Clinton, MD	(redshirt) Sophomore	Boston College
Roq Montgomery	55	OL	6'3	332	Anniston, AL	(redshirt) Sophomore	Western Kentucky
Richard Young	9	RB	5'11	212	Lehigh Acres, FL	(redshirt) Sophomore	Colorado
Jaylen Mbakwe	3	WR	5'11	190	Pinson, AL	Sophomore	Georgia Tech
Jalen Hale	8	WR	6'1	189	Longview, TX	(redshirt) Sophomore	SMU
Joseph Ionata	69	OL	6'5	294	Clearwater, FL	(redshirt) Freshman	Georgia Tech
Olaus Alinen	73	OL	6'6	326	Pori, Finland	(redshirt) Junior	Kentucky
Noah Carter	24	LB	6'4	220	Peoria, AZ	(redshirt) Freshman	Georgia Tech
Keon Keeley	31	LB/DL	6'5	242	Tampa, FL	(redshirt) Junior	Notre Dame
Cam Calhoun	9	CB	6'0	177	Cincinnati, OH	(redshirt) Junior	Ohio State
Cole Adams	7	WR	5'10	186	Owasso, OK	(redshirt) Sophomore	Vanderbilt
Peter Notaro	37	K	5'11	188	Wexford, PA	Freshman	West Virginia
David Bird	45	LS	6'0	220	Phoenix, AZ	Sophomore	TBD
Micah Debose	65	OL	6'5	330	Mobile, AL	(redshirt) Freshman	Vanderbilt
Wilkin Formby	75	OL	6'7	320	Tuscaloosa, AL	(redshirt) Sophomore	Texas A&M
Kelby Collins	17	DL	6'4	275	Gardendale, AL	Junior	South Carolina
James Smith	23	DL	6'3	296	Montgomery, AL	(redshirt) Junior	Ohio State
Arkel Anugwom	76	OL	6'6"	332	Antioch, TN	Junior	Northwestern
Isaiah Horton	1	WR	6'4"	205	Nashville, TN	(redshirt) Junior	Texas A&M
Qua Russaw	4	LB	6'3	242	Montgomery, AL	(redshirt) Sophomore	Ohio State
Jordan Renaud	11	DL	6'4	261	Sarasota, FL	Redshirt Sophomore	Ole Miss

Note: Players with a dash in the new school column didn't land on a new team for the 2025 season.

==== Acquisitions ====
Over the off-season, Alabama added twenty-one players from the transfer portal. According to 247 Sports, Alabama had the No. 15 ranked transfer class in the country.

Name	Pos.	Height	Weight	Hometown	Year	Eligibility Remaining	Prev school
Josh Ford	TE	6'6	265	Stillwater, OK	Sophomore	3	Oklahoma State
Kaden Strayhorn	OL	6'2	308	Novi, MI	Redshirt Freshman	4	Michigan
Devan Thompkins	DL	6'5	285	Tracy, CA	Redshirt Junior	1	USC
Caleb Woodson	LB	6'3	230	Haymarket, VA	Redshirt Junior	1	Virginia Tech
Ethan Stangle	LS	6'1	220	Bel Air, MD	Redshirt Junior	1	Syracuse
Adam Watford	P	5'11	190	Dothan, AL	Junior	1	North Alabama (FCS)
Carmelo O'Neal	S	6'4	200	Atlanta, GA	Sophomore	2	Mercer (FCS)
Jaxon Shuttlesworth	TE	6'5	230	Chelsea, AL	Redshirt Freshman	3	Jacksonvile State
Kedrick Bingley-Jones	DL	6'4	320	Concord, NC	Redshirt Senior	1	Mississippi State
Noah Rogers	WR	6'2	205	Raleigh, NC	Redshirt Sophomore	2	NC State
Ty Haywood	OL	6'5	285	Denton, TX	Redshirt Freshman	4	Michigan
Lorcan Quinn	K	6'1	188	Donaghmore, Northern Ireland	Freshman	3	Marshall
Caleb Smith	DL	6'5	270	Birmingham, AL	Redshirt Freshman	4	Washington
Racin Delgatty	OL	6'3	300	La Cañada Flintridge, CA	Redshirt Sophomore	2	Cal Poly (FCS)
Nick Brooks	OL	6'7	349	Cedar Rapids, IA	Freshman	3	Texas
Ethan Fields	OL	6'3	320	Geismar, LA	Redshirt Sophomore	2	Ole Miss
Terrance Green	DL	6'5	330	Cypress, TX	Redshirt Sophomore	2	Oregon
Desmond Umeozulu	LB	6'6	255	Upper Marlboro, MD	Junior	1	South Carolina
Jayvin Q. James	OL	6'5	320	Deerfield Beach, FL	Redshirt Sophomore	2	Mississippi State
Khalifa Keith	RB	6'1	235	Birmingham, AL	Sophomore	2	Appalachian State
Leslie Black	DL	6'5	280	Statesboro, GA	Sophomore	2	West Georgia (FCS)

==== 2026 recruits ====
The following recruits and transfers have signed letters of intent or verbally committed to the Alabama Crimson Tide football program for the 2026 recruiting year.

College recruiting
Name	Hometown	School	Height	Weight	Commit date
Jireh Edwards #1 Safety	Baltimore, MD	St. Frances Academy	6 ft 2 in (1.88 m)	210 lb (95 kg)	Jul 5, 2025
Jireh Edwards #1 Safety	Recruit ratings: 247Sports: On3: ESPN: (90)				
Ezavier Crowell* #3 Running back	Jackson, AL	Jackson High School	5 ft 11 in (1.80 m)	210 lb (95 kg)	Jun 26, 2025
Ezavier Crowell* #3 Running back	Recruit ratings: 247Sports: On3: ESPN: (90)				
Xavier Griffin #3 Outside linebacker	Cullman, AL	Gainesville HS (GA)	6 ft 4 in (1.93 m)	205 lb (93 kg)	Jun 29, 2025
Xavier Griffin #3 Outside linebacker	Recruit ratings: 247Sports: On3: ESPN: (89)				
Jorden Edmonds #3 Cornerback	Marietta, GA	Sprayberry High School	6 ft 0 in (1.83 m)	205 lb (93 kg)	Mar 26, 2025
Jorden Edmonds #3 Cornerback	Recruit ratings: 247Sports: On3: ESPN: (86)				
Cederian Morgan #5 Wide receiver	Alexander City, AL	Benjamin Russell High School	6 ft 4 in (1.93 m)	210 lb (95 kg)	Jul 2, 2025
Cederian Morgan #5 Wide receiver	Recruit ratings: 247Sports: On3: ESPN: (86)				
Nolan Wilson #7 Defensive end	Picayune, MS	Picayune Memorial High School	6 ft 5 in (1.96 m)	250 lb (110 kg)	Jul 4, 2025
Nolan Wilson #7 Defensive end	Recruit ratings: 247Sports: On3: ESPN: (84)				
Zyan Gibson #8 Cornerback	Gadsden, AL	Gadsden City High School	6 ft 0 in (1.83 m)	175 lb (79 kg)	Dec 25, 2024
Zyan Gibson #8 Cornerback	Recruit ratings: 247Sports: On3: ESPN: (84)				
Jamarion Matthews #12 Defensive end	Gainesville, GA	Gainesville High School	6 ft 3 in (1.91 m)	255 lb (116 kg)	Feb 21, 2025
Jamarion Matthews #12 Defensive end	Recruit ratings: 247Sports: On3: ESPN: (83)				
Jett Thomalla #5 Quarterback	Omaha, NE	Millard South High School	6 ft 4 in (1.93 m)	200 lb (91 kg)	Jun 17, 2025
Jett Thomalla #5 Quarterback	Recruit ratings: 247Sports: On3: ESPN: (83)				
Mack Sutter #5 Tight end	Dunlap, IL	Dunlap High School	6 ft 5 in (1.96 m)	220 lb (100 kg)	Jun 26, 2025
Mack Sutter #5 Tight end	Recruit ratings: 247Sports: On3: ESPN: (82)				
Kamhariyan Johnson; Defensive end	Muscle Shoals, AL	Muscle Shoals High School	6 ft 3 in (1.91 m)	260 lb (120 kg)	Apr 12, 2025
Kamhariyan Johnson; Defensive end	Recruit ratings: 247Sports: On3: ESPN: (80)				
Chris Booker; Offensive guard	Atlanta, GA	Hapeville Charter High School	6 ft 4 in (1.93 m)	280 lb (130 kg)	Feb 20, 2025
Chris Booker; Offensive guard	Recruit ratings: 247Sports: On3: ESPN: (79)				
Rihyael Kelley; Safety	Cincinnati, OH	Winton Woods High School	6 ft 3 in (1.91 m)	180 lb (82 kg)	Jun 23, 2025
Rihyael Kelley; Safety	Recruit ratings: 247Sports: On3: ESPN: (79)				
Malique Franklin; Defensive end	Daphne, AL	Daphne High School	6 ft 5 in (1.96 m)	250 lb (110 kg)	Dec 2, 2025
Malique Franklin; Defensive end	Recruit ratings: 247Sports: On3: ESPN: (79)				
Corey Howard; Defensive end	Valdosta, GA	Valdosta High School	6 ft 6 in (1.98 m)	230 lb (100 kg)	Oct 19, 2025
Corey Howard; Defensive end	Recruit ratings: 247Sports: On3: ESPN: (79)				
Bryson Cooley; Offensive guard	Laurel, MS	West Jones High School	6 ft 6 in (1.98 m)	320 lb (150 kg)	Jun 11, 2024
Bryson Cooley; Offensive guard	Recruit ratings: 247Sports: On3: ESPN: (79)				
Tayden-Evan Kaawa; Quarterback	East Orem, UT	Orem High School	N/A	235 lb (107 kg)	Jul 2, 2025
Tayden-Evan Kaawa; Quarterback	Recruit ratings: 247Sports: On3: ESPN: (78)				
Jared Doughty; Offensive tackle	College Park, GA	Benjamin E. Banneker High School	6 ft 5 in (1.96 m)	270 lb (120 kg)	Oct 5, 2025
Jared Doughty; Offensive tackle	Recruit ratings: 247Sports: On3: ESPN: (78)				
Treshawn Brown; Running back	Huntsville, TX	Huntsville HS	5 ft 9 in (1.75 m)	190 lb (86 kg)	Dec 4, 2025
Treshawn Brown; Running back	Recruit ratings: 247Sports: On3: ESPN: (77)				
Tyrell Miller #1 Offensive guard	Newark, CA	College of San Mateo (JC)	6 ft 5 in (1.96 m)	305 lb (138 kg)	Nov 29, 2025
Tyrell Miller #1 Offensive guard	Recruit ratings: 247Sports: On3: ESPN: (77)				
Amari Sabb; Athlete	Glassboro, NJ	Glassboro High School	5 ft 9 in (1.75 m)	165 lb (75 kg)	Feb 3, 2026
Amari Sabb; Athlete	Recruit ratings: 247Sports: On3: ESPN: (76)				
Bear Fretwell; Offensive tackle	Brooklet, GA	Southeast Bulloch High School	6 ft 6 in (1.98 m)	290 lb (130 kg)	Jul 25, 2025
Bear Fretwell; Offensive tackle	Recruit ratings: 247Sports: On3: ESPN: (76)				
Nick Sherman #6 Cornerback	Tuscaloosa, AL	Itawamba Community College (JC)	6 ft 1 in (1.85 m)	200 lb (91 kg)	Dec 14, 2025
Nick Sherman #6 Cornerback	Recruit ratings: 247Sports: On3: ESPN: (76)				
Zay Hall; Inside linebacker	Tuscaloosa, AL	Hillcrest HS	6 ft 2 in (1.88 m)	225 lb (102 kg)	Jun 27, 2025
Zay Hall; Inside linebacker	Recruit ratings: 247Sports: On3: ESPN: (76)				
Tyler Henderson; Wide receiver	Vicksburg, MS	Mississippi Gulf Coast CC (JC)	6 ft 0 in (1.83 m)	175 lb (79 kg)	Feb 14, 2026
Tyler Henderson; Wide receiver	Recruit ratings: 247Sports: On3: ESPN: (76)				
Eli Deutsch #12 Long snapper	Franklin, WI	Franklin HS	6 ft 2 in (1.88 m)	225 lb (102 kg)	Jun 24, 2025
Eli Deutsch #12 Long snapper	Recruit ratings: ESPN: (68)				
Maurice Mathis Jr. Wide receiver	Warner Robins, GA	Houston County HS	6 ft 1 in (1.85 m)	180 lb (82 kg)	Jan 17, 2026
Maurice Mathis Jr. Wide receiver	Recruit ratings: 247Sports:				
Aubrey Walker; Athlete	Moody, AL	Moody High School	5 ft 10 in (1.78 m)	165 lb (75 kg)	Jan 22, 2026
Aubrey Walker; Athlete	Recruit ratings: 247Sports:				
George French; Defensive back	Birmingham, AL	Homewood High School	6 ft 1 in (1.85 m)	180 lb (82 kg)	Feb 18, 2026
George French; Defensive back	Recruit ratings: 247Sports:				
Jude Cascone; Tight end	Marietta, GA	Walton High School	6 ft 2 in (1.88 m)	225 lb (102 kg)	Nov 30, 2025
Jude Cascone; Tight end	Recruit ratings: 247Sports:				
Overall recruit ranking: 247Sports: 2 On3: 4
‡ Refers to 40-yard dash; Note: In many cases, Scout, Rivals, 247Sports, On3, and ESPN may conflict in their listings of height, weight and 40 time.; In these cases, the average was taken. ESPN grades are on a 100-point scale.; Sources: "2026 Player commitments - Alabama". ESPN.; "2026 Team Ranking". Rivals.com.; "Alabama Football 2026 commits". 247Sports.; "2026 Alabama Football recruits". On3.

*Originally class of 2027, but reclassified to 2026.

*= 247Sports Composite rating; ratings are out of 1.00. (five stars= 1.00–.98, four stars= .97–.90, three stars= .80–.89)
†= Despite being rated as a four and five star recruit by ESPN, On3.com and 247Sports.com, TBD and TBD received a four star 247Sports Composite rating.
Δ= TBD left the Alabama program following signing but prior to the 2026 season.

2026 Overall class rankings

Website	National rank	Conference rank	5 star recruits	4 star recruits	3 star recruits	Total
ESPN	--	--	1	10	11	23
On3 Recruits/Rivals	#4	#1	3	11	8	22
247 Sports	#2	#2	4	10	8	22

==== Walk-ons ====
Name	Pos.	Height	Weight	Hometown	High school
				-	-

=== Coaching changes ===
==== Coaching staff departures ====
Name	Position	New Team	New Position	Source
JaMarcus Shephard	Co-offensive coordinator/Wide receivers coach	Accepted job at Oregon State	Head coach	
Nick Sheridan	Co-offensive coordinator/Quarterbacks coach	Accepted job at Michigan State	Quarterbacks coach	
Chris Kapilovic	Offensive line coach	Accepted job at Auburn Tigers	Offensive analyst	

==== Coaching staff additions ====
Name	New Position	Previous Team	Previous Position	Source
Derrick Nix	Wide receivers coach	Auburn	Co-offensive coordinator/Running back coach	
Adrian Klemm	Offensive line coach	USC	Offensive analyst	
Richard Owens	Tight ends coach	Louisville	Offensive line coach	

=== Returning starters ===
The Crimson Tide return 0 starters from the previous season. They return 0 on offense, 0 on defense, and 0 on special teams.

Offense
Player	Class	Position
		QB
		RB
		WR
		TE
		OL

Defense
Player	Class	Position
		EDGE
		LB
		DL

Special teams
Player	Class	Position
		K
		P
		LS
		H

* Bowl game not played. ^ Waiting decision for 2026 season. † Indicates player was a starter in 2025 but missed all of 2026 due to injury.

== Preseason ==
=== SEC media days ===
==== Preseason media poll ====
Preseason polls were released on July 24, 2026.

SEC
Predicted finish	Team	Votes (1st place)
1	Georgia	2,519
2	Texas	2,449
3	Ole Miss	2,004
4	Texas A&M	1,967
5	LSU	1,961
6	Alabama	1,930
7	Oklahoma	1,914
8	Tennessee	1,320
9	Florida	1,217
10	Missouri	1,105
11	South Carolina	956
12	Auburn	936
13	Vanderbilt	751
14	Kentucky	546
15	Mississippi State	467
16	Arkansas	262

Media poll (SEC Championship)
Rank	Team	Votes
1	Georgia	88
2	Texas	57
3	Ole Miss	6
4	Texas A&M	5
5	Alabama	3
6	Oklahoma	2
7	LSU	2
8	Kentucky	1

=== 2026 All-SEC Preseason teams ===
==== Media ====
First Team

Position	Player	Class
Offense
WR	Ryan Coleman–Williams	Jr.
DB	Zabien Brown	Jr.
DB	Bray Hubbard	Sr.

Second Team

Position	Player	Class
Offense
OL	Michael Carroll	So.

Third Team

Position	Player	Class
Defense
LB	Yhonzae Pierre	R-Jr.
DB	Keon Sabb	Sr.

==== Coaches ====
First Team

Position	Player	Class
Defense
DB	Bray Hubbard	Sr.
DB	Zabien Brown	Jr.

Second Team

Position	Player	Class
Offense
WR	Ryan Coleman-Williams	Jr.
OL	Michael Carroll	So.

Third Team

Position	Player	Class
Defense
DB	Keon Sabb	Sr.
LB	Yhonzae Pierre	Sr.

=== Award watch lists ===
Listed in the order that they were released

Award	Player	Position	Year	Source
Lott Trophy	Bray Hubbard	Safety	Sr.	
Dodd Trophy	Kalen DeBoer	Head coach	–—	
Maxwell Award	Ryan Coleman-Williams	Wide receiver	Jr.	
Outland Trophy	Michael Carroll	Offensive lineman	So.	
Bronko Nagurski Trophy	Bray Hubbard	Safety	Sr.	
Bronko Nagurski Trophy	Zabien Brown	Cornerback	Jr.	
Lou Groza Award	Lorcan Quinn	Placekicker	So.	
Wuerffel Trophy	Bray Hubbard	Safety	Sr.	
Jim Thorpe Award	Bray Hubbard	Safety	Sr.	
Jim Thorpe Award	Zabien Brown	Cornerback	Jr.	
Butkus Award	Caleb Woodson	Linebacker	Sr.	
Biletnikoff Award	Ryan Coleman–Williams	Wide receiver	Jr.	
Comeback Player of the Year Award	Jeremiah Beaman	Defensive lineman	Jr.	
Comeback Player of the Year Award	Jah-Marien Latham	Linebacker	6th year	
Bednarik Award	Bray Hubbard	Safety	Sr.	
Bednarik Award	Zabien Brown	Cornerback	Jr.	
Bednarik Award	Yhonzae Pierre	Linebacker	Sr.	
Shaun Alexander Freshman Player of the Year Award	EJ Crowell	Running back	Fr.	
Shaun Alexander Freshman Player of the Year Award	Jireh Edwards	Defensive back	Fr.	
Shaun Alexander Freshman Player of the Year Award	Keelon Russell	Quarterback	Fr.	

=== Preseason All-Americans ===
Preseason All-American Honors
Player	Position	Class	Designation	AP	Athlon	CBS Sports	ESPN	SI	SN	USA Today	WCFF
Bray Hubbard	CB	Sr.	1st team defense (Athlon)	✓	✓	n/a	n/a	n/a	n/a	✓	n/a

Other All-Americans teams
Player	Position	Class	Selector(s)
Bray Hubbard	CB	Sr.	2nd team defense (CBS, ESPN, Sporting News, Walter Camp)
Keon Sabb	CB	Sr.	3rd team defense (Athlon)
Ryan Coleman-Williams	WR	Jr.	3rd team offense (Athlon)
Yhonzae Pierre	WR	R-Jr.	4th team defense (Athlon)
Zabien Brown	CB	Jr.	2nd team defense (AP, CBS, SI, USA Today); 3rd team defense (Athlon)

== Schedule ==
Date	Time	Opponent	Rank	Site	TV	Result	Attendance
September 5	11:00 a.m.	East Carolina*	No. 13	Bryant–Denny Stadium; Tuscaloosa, AL	ABC	W 48–10	100,077
September 12	2:30 p.m.	at Kentucky	No. 12	Kroger Field; Lexington, KY (SEC Nation)	ABC	W 45–17	61,820
September 19	2:30 p.m.	Florida State*	No. 10	Bryant–Denny Stadium; Tuscaloosa, AL	ABC/ESPN2	W 50–36	100,077
September 26	6:00 p.m.	South Carolina	No. 8	Bryant–Denny Stadium; Tuscaloosa, AL	ESPN	W 49–18	100,077
October 3	11:00 a.m.	at No. 16 Mississippi State	No. 7	Davis Wade Stadium; Starkville, MS (rivalry, SEC Nation)	ABC	W 56–23	60,417
October 10	6:30 p.m.	No. 2 Georgia	No. 6	Bryant–Denny Stadium; Tuscaloosa, AL (College GameDay, rivalry)	ABC	L 17–20	100,077
October 17	2:30 p.m.	at No. 14 Tennessee	No. 6	Neyland Stadium; Knoxville, TN (Third Saturday in October, SEC Nation)	ABC	L 10–26	101,915
October 24	2:30 p.m.	Texas A&M^{†}	No. 13	Bryant–Denny Stadium; Tuscaloosa, AL	ABC	W 31–20	100,077
November 7	2:30 p.m.	at No. 14 LSU	No. 5	Tiger Stadium; Baton Rouge, LA (rivalry)	ABC	W 31–13	102,321
November 14	11:45 a.m.	at Vanderbilt	No. 3	FirstBank Stadium; Nashville, TN	SECN	W 21–6	35,000
November 21	1:00 p.m.	Chattanooga*	No. 3	Bryant–Denny Stadium; Tuscaloosa, AL	SECN+	W 47–0	98,552
November 28	6:30 p.m.	Auburn		Bryant–Denny Stadium; Tuscaloosa, AL (Iron Bowl)	ABC		
*Non-conference game; ^{†}Homecoming; Rankings from AP Poll (and CFP Rankings, after November 3) - Released prior to game; All times are in Central time; Source:

== Rankings ==
Ranking movements Legend: ██ Increase in ranking ██ Decrease in ranking
	Week															
Poll	Pre	1	2	3	4	5	6	7	8	9	10	11	12	13	14	Final
AP	13	12	10	8	7	6	6	13	10	9	7	7	6			
Coaches	11	12	10	8	7	7	7	13	10	9	7	7	5			
CFP	Not released									5	3	3				Not released

== Game summaries ==
=== vs East Carolina ===
East Carolina Pirates (0–0) at No. 13 Alabama Crimson Tide (0–0) – Game summary

Quarter	1	2	3	4	Total
Pirates	0	7	3	0	10
No. 13 Crimson Tide	10	28	0	10	48

at Bryant–Denny Stadium • Tuscaloosa, Alabama

- Date: September 5
- Game time: 11:00 a.m. CDT
- Game weather: Sunny • Temperature: 90 °F (32 °C) • Wind: S at 4 miles per hour (6.4 km/h)
- Game attendance: 100,077
- Referee: Jason Autrey
- TV announcers (ABC): Bob Wischusen, Louis Riddick, and Stormy Buonantony

Game information

First quarter

- ALA – Conor Talty 41-yard field goal, 9:30. Crimson Tide 3–0. Drive: 9 plays, 46 yards, 5:24.
- ALA – EJ Crowell 3-yard run (Conor Talty kick), 4:12. Crimson Tide 10–0. Drive: 9 plays, 86 yards, 4:02.

Second quarter

- ALA – Daniel Hill 4-yard run (Conor Talty kick), 14:48. Crimson Tide 17–0. Drive: 6 plays, 26 yards, 2:24.
- ECU – Jeremiah Melvin 1-yard pass from Mitch Griffis (Noah Perez kick), 13:41. Crimson Tide 17–7. Drive: 3 plays, 75 yards, 1:07.
- ALA – Daniel Hill 2-yard run (Conor Talty kick), 10:02. Crimson Tide 24–7. Drive: 7 plays, 86 yards, 3:33.
- ALA – Yhonzae Pierre 27-yard interception return (Conor Talty kick), 9:15. Crimson Tide 31–7.
- ALA – Keelon Russell 3-yard run (Conor Talty kick), 0:14. Crimson Tide 38–7. Drive: 15 plays, 80 yards, 6:11.

Third quarter

- ECU – Noah Perez 34-yard field goal, 10:54. Crimson Tide 38–10. Drive: 6 plays, 14 yards, 2:39.

Fourth quarter

- ALA – Trae'shawn Brown 2-yard run (Conor Talty kick), 14:57. Crimson Tide 45–10. Drive: 9 plays, 77 yards, 3:17.
- ALA – Conor Talty 21-yard field goal, 6:15. Crimson Tide 48–10. Drive: 12 plays, 70 yards, 7:10.

Statistics	ECU	ALA
First downs	5	28
Plays–yards	41–162	81–487
Rushes–yards	22–2	49–227
Passing yards	160	260
Passing: comp–att–int	11–19–1	19–32–0
Turnovers	1	1
Time of possession	21:07	38:53

Team	Category	Player	Statistics
East Carolina	Passing	Mitch Griffis	10/16, 137 yards, TD, INT
East Carolina	Rushing	Ashton Gray	6 carries, 17 yards
East Carolina	Receiving	Tyler Johnson	1 reception, 68 yards
Alabama	Passing	Keelon Russell	18/30, 256 yards
Alabama	Rushing	Keelon Russell	13 carries, 86 yards, TD
Alabama	Receiving	Ryan Coleman-Williams	5 receptions, 130 yards

=== at Kentucky ===
No. 12 Alabama Crimson Tide (1–0) at Kentucky Wildcats (1–0) – Game summary

Quarter	1	2	3	4	Total
No. 12 Crimson Tide	7	6	18	14	45
Wildcats	7	10	0	0	17

at Kroger Field • Lexington, Kentucky

- Date: September 12
- Game time: 2:30 pm
- Game weather: Cloudy • Temperature: 78 °F (26 °C) • Wind: S at 8 miles per hour (13 km/h)
- Game attendance: 61,820
- Referee: Ted Pitts
- TV announcers (ABC): Sean McDonough, Greg McElroy, and Katie George

Game information

First quarter

- UK – Mi'Quise Humphrey-Grace 2-yard interception return (Adam Zouagui kick), 10:11. Wildcats 7–0.
- ALA – Luke Metz 34-yard interception return (Conor Talty kick), 6:35. Tied 7–7.

Second quarter

- UK – Henry Boyer 20-yard pass from Kenny Minchey (Adam Zouagui kick), 14:56. Wildcats 14–7. Drive: 13 plays, 83 yards, 6:33.
- ALA – Conor Talty 25-yard field goal, 9:27. Wildcats 14–10. Drive: 10 plays, 68 yards, 5:29.
- ALA – Conor Talty 41-yard field goal, 2:09. Wildcats 14–13. Drive: 8 plays, 44 yards, 4:13.
- UK – Adam Zouagui 39-yard field goal, 0:00. Wildcats 17–13. Drive: 9 plays, 33 yards, 0:55.

Third quarter

- ALA – Conor Talty 34-yard field goal, 7:10. Wildcats 17–16. Drive: 9 plays, 43 yards, 3:48.
- ALA – EJ Crowell 3-yard run (Conor Talty kick), 3:00. Crimson Tide 23–17. Drive: 5 plays, 21 yards, 2:42.
- ALA – Daniel Hill 3-yard run (Keelon Russell–Lotzeir Brooks pass), 0:24. Crimson Tide 31–17. Drive: 2 plays, 34 yards, 0:25.

Fourth quarter

- ALA – Rico Scott 5-yard pass from Keelon Russell (Conor Talty kick), 9:08. Crimson Tide 38–17. Drive: 9 plays, 74 yards, 5:03.
- ALA – Trae'shawn Brown 4-yard run (Conor Talty kick), 4:11. Crimson Tide 45–17. Drive: 5 plays, 43 yards, 2:54.

Statistics	ALA	UK
First downs	21	14
Plays–yards	63–343	64–209
Rushes–yards	40–155	32–63
Passing yards	188	146
Passing: comp–att–int	16–23–2	18–32–1
Turnovers	3	3
Time of possession	32:14	27:46

Team	Category	Player	Statistics
Alabama	Passing	Keelon Russell	16/23, 188 yards, TD, 2 INT
Alabama	Rushing	Daniel Hill	18 carries, 104 yards, TD
Alabama	Receiving	Lotzeir Brooks	5 receptions, 54 yards
Kentucky	Passing	Kenny Minchey	18/31, 146 yards, TD, INT
Kentucky	Rushing	Jason Patterson	11 carries, 53 yards
Kentucky	Receiving	Willie Rodriguez	8 receptions, 49 yards

=== vs Florida State ===
Florida State Seminoles (1–1) at No. 10 Alabama Crimson Tide (2–0) – Game summary

Quarter	1	2	3	4	Total
Seminoles	14	7	7	8	36
No. 10 Crimson Tide	3	23	14	10	50

at Bryant–Denny Stadium • Tuscaloosa, Alabama

- Date: September 19
- Game time: 5:15 p.m (delayed from 3:30 p.m due to a lightning delay)
- Game weather: Sunny • Temperature: 92 °F (33 °C) • Wind: S at 4 miles per hour (6.4 km/h)
- Game attendance: 100,077
- Referee: Kyle Olson
- TV announcers (ABC): Sean McDonough, Greg McElroy, and Katie George
- Box Score, Recap

Game information

First Quarter

- FSU - Robinson,Duce 20 yd pass from Daniels,Ashton (Panikowski,Gabe kick) 7 plays, 72 yards, TOP 03:24
- ALA - Talty,Conor 32 yd field goal 8 plays, 20 yards, TOP 03:27
- FSU - Kromah,Ousmane 12 yd run (Panikowski,Gabe kick), 3 plays, 69 yards, TOP 01:17

Second Quarter

- ALA - Talty,Conor 43 yd field goal 9 plays, 50 yards, TOP 02:33
- FSU - Daniels,Ashton 3 yd run (Panikowski,Gabe kick), 9 plays, 75 yards, TOP 04:57
- ALA - Morgan,Cederian 21 yd pass from Russell,Keelon (Talty,Conor kick) 12 plays, 75 yards, TOP 07:06
- ALA - Coleman-Williams,Ryan 46 yd pass from Russell,Keelon () 2 plays, 63 yards, TOP 00:14
- ALA - Edwards,Kaleb 16 yd pass from Russell,Keelon (Talty,Conor kick) 2 plays, 56 yards, TOP 00:12

Third Quarter

- FSU - Thomas,Landen 2 yd pass from Daniels,Ashton (Panikowski,Gabe kick) 9 plays, 75 yards, TOP 05:02
- ALA - Crowell,EJ 4 yd run (Talty,Conor kick), 8 plays, 75 yards, TOP 04:03
- ALA - Russell,Keelon 57 yd run (Talty,Conor kick), 3 plays, 64 yards, TOP 01:30

Fourth Quarter

- ALA - Talty,Conor 45 yd field goal 6 plays, 37 yards, TOP 02:17
- FSU - Daniels,Ashton 6 yd run (Daniels,Ashton rush), 6 plays, 75 yards, TOP 02:26
- ALA - Brown,Trae'shawn 20 yd run (Talty,Conor kick), 9 plays, 90 yards, TOP 05:02

Statistics	FSU	ALA
First downs	17	26
Plays–yards	64–471	66–567
Rushes–yards	35–94	36–247
Passing yards	377	320
Passing: comp–att–int	17–29–3	23–30–0
Turnovers	3	0
Time of possession	27:52	32:08

Team	Category	Player	Statistics
Florida State	Passing	Ashton Daniels	17/29, 377 yards, 2 TD, 3 INT
Florida State	Rushing	Ousmane Kromah	17 carries, 80 yards, TD
Florida State	Receiving	Duce Robinson	6 receptions, 135 yards, TD
Alabama	Passing	Keelon Russell	23/30, 320 yards, 3 TD
Alabama	Rushing	Trae'shawn Brown	12 carries, 86 yards, TD
Alabama	Receiving	Lotzeir Brooks	8 receptions, 101 yards

=== vs South Carolina ===
South Carolina Gamecocks (2–1) at No. 8 Alabama Crimson Tide (3–0) – Game summary

Quarter	1	2	3	4	Total
Gamecocks	0	10	0	8	18
No. 8 Crimson Tide	14	21	0	14	49

at Bryant–Denny Stadium • Tuscaloosa, Alabama

- Date: September 26
- Game time: 6:00 pm
- Game weather: Sunny • Temperature: 82 °F (28 °C) • Wind: S at 6 miles per hour (9.7 km/h)
- Game attendance: 100,077
- Referee: Daniel Gautreaux
- TV announcers (ESPN): Dave Pasch, Dusty Dvoracek, and Taylor McGregor

Game information

First quarter
Second quarter
Third quarter
Fourth quarter

Statistics	SC	ALA
First downs	22	20
Plays–yards	73–419	57–489
Rushes–yards	40–216	30–124
Passing yards	203	365
Passing: comp–att–int	20–33–1	21–27–0
Turnovers	2	0
Time of possession	29:40	30:20

Team	Category	Player	Statistics
South Carolina	Passing	LaNorris Sellers	18/30, 185 yards, TD, INT
South Carolina	Rushing	Matt Fuller	19 carries, 112 yards, TD
South Carolina	Receiving	Nyck Harbor	3 receptions, 42 yards, TD
Alabama	Passing	Keelon Russell	21/27, 365 yards, 4 TD
Alabama	Rushing	EJ Crowell	6 carries, 50 yards
Alabama	Receiving	Ryan Coleman-Williams	5 receptions, 98 yards, 2 TD

=== at No. 16 Mississippi State (rivalry) ===
No. 7 Alabama Crimson Tide (4–0) at No. 16 Mississippi State Bulldogs (4–0) – Game summary

Quarter	1	2	3	4	Total
No. 7 Crimson Tide	14	14	14	14	56
No. 16 Bulldogs	7	10	6	0	23

at Davis Wade Stadium • Starkville, Mississippi

- Date: October 3
- Game time: 11:00 a.m.
- Game weather: Sunny • Temperature: 82 °F (28 °C) • Wind: E at 4 miles per hour (6.4 km/h)
- Game attendance: 60,417
- Referee: Adam Savoie
- TV announcers (ABC): Sean McDonough, Greg McElroy, and Katie George

Game information

First quarter
Second quarter
Third quarter
Fourth quarter

Statistics	ALA	MSST
First downs	22	21
Plays–yards	61–483	70–302
Rushes–yards	37–179	30–18
Passing yards	304	284
Passing: comp–att–int	18–24–0	22–40–2
Turnovers	4	2
Time of possession	25:19	34:41

Team	Category	Player	Statistics
Alabama	Passing	Keelon Russell	16/22, 285 yards, 3 TD
Alabama	Rushing	Trae'shawn Brown	14 carries, 66 yards, 2 TD
Alabama	Receiving	Lotzeir Brooks	4 receptions, 96 yards
Mississippi State	Passing	Kamario Taylor	19/34, 258 yards, 3 TD, 2 INT
Mississippi State	Rushing	Kolin Wilson	10 carries, 27 yards
Mississippi State	Receiving	Anthony Evans III	12 receptions, 166 yards, 2 TD

=== vs No. 2 Georgia (rivalry) ===
Both Alabama and Georgia are undefeated this season going into the weekend. Due to expected heavy weather from Hurricane Isaias, various pre-game events have been postponed or cancelled, including president Donald Trump's previously-planned attendance.

No. 2 Georgia Bulldogs (5–0) at No. 6 Alabama Crimson Tide (5–0) – Game summary

Quarter	1	2	3	4	Total
No. 2 Bulldogs	3	7	7	3	20
No. 6 Crimson Tide	0	14	3	0	17

at Bryant–Denny Stadium • Tuscaloosa, Alabama

- Date: October 10
- Game time: 6:30 p.m. CDT
- Game weather: Cloudy • Temperature: 61 °F (16 °C) • Wind: E at 6 miles per hour (9.7 km/h)
- Game attendance: 100,077
- Referee: Kyle Olson
- TV announcers (ABC): Chris Fowler, Kirk Herbstreit, Holly Rowe, and Laura Rutledge

Game information

First quarter

- (3:25) UGA – Peyton Woodring 43-yard field goal (Drive: 7 plays, 36 yards, 4:15; Georgia 3–0)

Second quarter

- (7:09) UGA – London Humphreys 20-yard pass from Gunner Stockton, Peyton Woodring kick (Drive: 9 plays, 93 yards, 5:08; Georgia 10–0)
- (5:49) ALA – Marshall Pritchett 22-yard pass from Keelon Russell, Connor Talty kick (Drive: 3 plays, 89 yards, 1:12; Georgia 10–7)
- (0:03) ALA – EJ Crowell 1-yard run, Connor Talty kick (Drive: 12 plays, 80 yards, 1:42; Alabama 14–10)

Third quarter

- (10:38) UGA – Gunner Stockton 14-yard run, Peyton Woodring kick (Drive: 8 plays, 75 yards, 4:22; Georgia 17–14)
- (5:07) ALA – Connor Talty 39-yard field goal (Drive: 10 plays, 54 yards, 5:31; Tied 17–17)

Fourth quarter

- (5:25) UGA – Peyton Woodring 23-yard field goal (Drive: 10 plays, 84 yards, 5:19; Georgia 20–17)

Statistics	UGA	ALA
First downs	21	17
Plays–yards	61−455	60−346
Rushes–yards	39−206	29−161
Passing yards	249	185
Passing: comp–att–int	18−22−1	16−31−0
Turnovers	1	1
Time of possession	33:28	26:32

Team	Category	Player	Statistics
Georgia	Passing	Gunner Stockton	18/22, 249 yards, TD, INT
Georgia	Rushing	Dwight Phillips Jr.	17 carries, 120 yards
Georgia	Receiving	Jaden Reddell	1 reception, 53 yards
Alabama	Passing	Keelon Russell	16/31, 185 yards, TD
Alabama	Rushing	Trae'shawn Brown	9 carries, 90 yards
Alabama	Receiving	Ryan Coleman-Williams	3 receptions, 39 yards

=== at No. 14 Tennessee (Third Saturday in October) ===
No. 6 Alabama Crimson Tide (5–1) at No. 14 Tennessee Volunteers (5–1) – Game summary

Quarter	1	2	3	4	Total
No. 6 Crimson Tide	0	10	0	0	10
No. 14 Volunteers	9	3	7	7	26

at Neyland Stadium • Knoxville, Tennessee

- Date: October 17
- Game time: 2:30 p.m. CDT
- Game weather: Cloudy • Temperature: 59 °F (15 °C) • Wind: N 10 miles per hour (16 km/h)
- Game attendance: 101,915
- Referee: Tim Barker
- TV announcers (ABC): Sean McDonough, Greg McElroy, and Katie George

Game information

First quarter
Second quarter
Third quarter
Fourth quarter

Statistics	ALA	TENN
First downs	12	20
Plays–yards	55–201	72-347
Rushes–yards	26–54	41–150
Passing yards	147	197
Passing: comp–att–int	19–29–2	21–31–1
Turnovers	4	2
Time of possession	24:16	35:44

Team	Category	Player	Statistics
Alabama	Passing	Keelon Russell	19/29, 147 yards, 1 INT
Alabama	Rushing	Keelon Russell	11 carries, 43 yards, 1 TD
Alabama	Receiving	Marshall Pritchett	6 receptions, 39 yards
Tennessee	Passing	George MacIntyre	21/31, 197 yards, 1 INT
Tennessee	Rushing	DeSean Bishop	32 carries, 159 yards, 2 TD
Tennessee	Receiving	Mike Matthews	7 receptions, 85 yards

=== vs Texas A&M ===
Texas A&M Aggies (4–3) at No. 13 Alabama Crimson Tide (5–2) – Game summary

Quarter	1	2	3	4	Total
Aggies	7	10	3	0	20
No. 13 Crimson Tide	10	7	0	14	31

at Bryant–Denny Stadium • Tuscaloosa, Alabama

- Date: October 24
- Game time: 2:30 p.m. CDT
- Game weather: Sunny • Temperature: 76 °F (24 °C) • Wind: SW 7 miles per hour (11 km/h)
- Game attendance: 100,077
- Referee: Adam Savoie
- TV announcers (ABC): Joe Tessitore, Jesse Palmer, and Kris Budden

Game information

First quarter
Second quarter
Third quarter
Fourth quarter

Statistics	TAMU	ALA
First downs	18	20
Plays–yards	61–278	58–379
Rushes–yards	40–115	28–68
Passing yards	163	311
Passing: comp–att–int	14–21–2	19–30–1
Turnovers	3	1
Time of possession	33:10	26:50

Team	Category	Player	Statistics
Texas A&M	Passing	Marcel Reed	14/21, 163 yards, TD, 2 INT
Texas A&M	Rushing	KJ Edwards	8 carries, 43 yards
Texas A&M	Receiving	Mario Craver	6 receptions, 45 yards, TD
Alabama	Passing	Keelon Russell	19/30, 311 yards, 3 TD, INT
Alabama	Rushing	Daniel Hill	9 carries, 36 yards
Alabama	Receiving	Rico Scott	6 receptions, 156 yards

=== at No. 14 LSU (rivalry) ===
No. 5 Alabama Crimson Tide (6–2) at No. 14 LSU Tigers (6–2) – Game summary

Quarter	1	2	3	4	Total
No. 5 Crimson Tide	3	7	7	14	31
No. 14 Tigers	3	0	10	0	13

at Tiger Stadium • Baton Rouge, Louisiana

- Date: November 7
- Game time: 3:30 p.m.
- Game weather:
- Game attendance:
- Referee: Daniel Gautreaux
- TV announcers (ABC): Chris Fowler, Kirk Herbstreit, Holly Rowe, and Laura Rutledge

Game information

First quarter
Second quarter
Third quarter
Fourth quarter

Statistics	ALA	LSU
First downs		
Plays–yards		
Rushes–yards		
Passing yards		
Passing: comp–att–int		
Turnovers		
Time of possession		

Team	Category	Player	Statistics
Alabama	Passing		
Alabama	Rushing		
Alabama	Receiving		
LSU	Passing		
LSU	Rushing		
LSU	Receiving		

=== at Vanderbilt ===
No. 3 Alabama Crimson Tide (7–2) at Vanderbilt Commodores (4–5) – Game summary

Quarter	1	2	3	4	Total
No. 3 Crimson Tide	0	7	14	0	21
Commodores	0	3	3	0	6

at FirstBank Stadium • Nashville, Tennessee

- Date: November 14
- Game time: 1:00 p.m.
- Game weather:
- Game attendance:
- Referee: Jason Autrey
- TV announcers (SECN): Matt Schumacker, Aaron Murray, and Taylor Davis

Game information

First quarter
Second quarter
Third quarter
Fourth quarter

Statistics	ALA	VAN
First downs		
Plays–yards		
Rushes–yards		
Passing yards		
Passing: comp–att–int		
Turnovers		
Time of possession		

Team	Category	Player	Statistics
Alabama	Passing		
Alabama	Rushing		
Alabama	Receiving		
Vanderbilt	Passing		
Vanderbilt	Rushing		
Vanderbilt	Receiving		

=== vs Chattanooga (FCS) ===
Chattanooga Mocs (7–4) at No. 3 Alabama Crimson Tide (8–2) – Game summary

Quarter	1	2	Total
Mocs (FCS)			0
No. 3 Crimson Tide			0

at Bryant–Denny Stadium • Tuscaloosa, Alabama

- Date: November 21
- Game time: 1:00 pm
- Game weather:
- Game attendance:
- Referee: Jeff Heaser
- TV announcers (SECN+/ESPN+): Clay Matvick, Rocky Boiman, and Laura Stickells

Game information

First quarter
Second quarter
Third quarter
Fourth quarter

Statistics	UTC	ALA
First downs		
Plays–yards		
Rushes–yards		
Passing yards		
Passing: comp–att–int		
Turnovers		
Time of possession		

Team	Category	Player	Statistics
Chattanooga	Passing		
Chattanooga	Rushing		
Chattanooga	Receiving		
Alabama	Passing		
Alabama	Rushing		
Alabama	Receiving		

=== vs Auburn (Iron Bowl) ===
Auburn Tigers (0–0) at Alabama Crimson Tide (0–0) – Game summary

Quarter	1	2	Total
Tigers			0
Crimson Tide			0

at Bryant–Denny Stadium • Tuscaloosa, Alabama

- Date: November 28
- Game time: 6:30 p.m.
- Game weather:
- Game attendance:
- Referee:
- TV announcers ( ):

Game information

First quarter
Second quarter
Third quarter
Fourth quarter

Statistics	AUB	ALA
First downs		
Plays–yards		
Rushes–yards		
Passing yards		
Passing: comp–att–int		
Turnovers		
Time of possession		

Team	Category	Player	Statistics
Auburn	Passing		
Auburn	Rushing		
Auburn	Receiving		
Alabama	Passing		
Alabama	Rushing		
Alabama	Receiving		

== Personnel ==
=== Roster ===
2026 Alabama Crimson Tide Football
Quarterbacks: 10 – Austin Mack – Senior (6'6, 226); 11 - Tayden-Evan Kaawa - Freshman (6'5, 235); 12 – Keelon Russell – Sophomore (6'3, 192); 13 – John Gazzaniga – Sophomore (6'7, 252); 15 - Jett Thomalla - Freshman (6'4, 200); 19 – John Cooper – Junior (6'2, 192); Running backs: 0 – AK Dear – Sophomore (6'0, 205); 4 - Daniel Hill - Junior (6'1, 231); 6 - Kevin Riley - Junior (5'11, 200); 13 – EJ Crowell – Freshman (5'11, 210); 17 - Trae'shawn Brown - Freshman (5'9, 190); 20 – Khalifa Keith – Senior (6'1, 235); 29 – Fredrick Moore – Junior (5'9, 160); Wide receivers: 1 - Ryan Coleman-Williams - Junior (6'1, 175); 3 – Lotzeir Brooks – Sophomore (5'9, 185); 5 - Noah Rogers - Senior (6'2, 205); 7 - Rico Scott - Junior (6'1, 198); 8 – Cederian Morgan – Freshman (6'4, 210); 14 - Tyler Henderson - Junior (6'1, 173); 21 - Maurice Mathis Jr. - Freshman (6'1, 180); 23 – MJ Chirgwin – 5th year (6'0, 195); 24 - Amari Sabb - Freshman (5'9, 155); 26 - Aubrey Walker - Freshman (5'10, 170); 27 – Elijah Murray – Senior (5'11, 185); 30 – Derek Meadows – Sophomore (6'5, 215); 31 – Cooper Mollison – Junior (5'10, 177); 42 – Ben Jackson – Sophomore (6'2, 170); 83 – Warner Ross – Senior (5'10, 183); Tight ends: 9 – Marshall Pritchett – Sophomore (6'5, 215); 18 - Mack Sutter – Freshman (6'5, 220); 40 - Josh Ford – Junior (6'6, 265); 45 - Peyton Fox - 5th year (6'4, 235); 80 - Jaxon Shuttlesworth – Junior (6'5, 230); 81 – Kaleb Edwards – Sophomore (6'6, 220); 85 – Jack Sammarco – Junior (6'5, 252); 86 - Jude Cascone - Freshman (6'2, 225); 87 – Danny Lewis Jr. – 5th year (6'5, 255); 88 - Jay Lindsey - Junior (6'5, 235); Specials teams: 31 – Conor Talty – Senior (6'2, 195) (K); 32 – Alex Asparuhov – Sophomore (6'3, 190) (P); 33 - Adam Watford - Senior (5'11, 190) (P); 44 - Alex Rozier - 5th year (6'4, 215) (LS); 45 - Jay Williams - Junior (6'1, 195) (LS); 47 - Eli Deutsch - Freshman (6'2, 225) (LS); 61 – Ethan Stangle – 5th year (6'1, 220) (LS); 90 - Lorcan Quinn - Sophomore (6'1, 188) (K); 95 - Anderson Green - Junior (6'0, 205) (P); 98 - Tucker Cornelius - Junior (6'3, 185) (K)	Offensive Lineman: 50 - Casey Poe - Junior (6'4, 290); 52 – Mal Waldrep Jr. – Sophomore (6'5, 280); 53 – Mac Smith – Senior (6'3, 270); 54 - Jayvin Q. James - Senior (6'5, 320); 55 - Racin Delgatty - Senior (6'3, 300); 57 - Bear Fretwell - Freshman (6'6, 290); 59 - JD Martin - Junior (6'2, 240); 62 – Davis Peterson – Senior (6'1, 235); 63 - Bryson Cooley - Freshman (6'6, 320); 64 – Michael Carroll – Sophomore (6'5, 290); 65 - Tyrell Miller - Junior (6'5, 305); 66 - Jared Graham – Freshman (6'6, 300); 68 – Billy Roby – Senior (5'11, 245); 69 – Baker Hickman – Senior (6'3, 315); 70 - William Sanders - Junior (6'3, 290); 71 - Nick Brooks - Sophomore (6'7, 349); 72 - Ty Haywood - Sophomore (6'5, 316); 73 - Chris Booker - Freshman (6'4, 280); 75 - Ethan Fields - Senior (6'3, 320); 77 – Jackson Lloyd – Sophomore (6'6, 295); 79 – Kaden Strayhorn – Sophomore (6'2, 308); Defensive Lineman: 1 – Devan Thompkins – 5th year (6'5, 285); 14 – Fatutoa Henry – 5th year (6'4, 272); 22 - Kedrick Bingley-Jones - 6th year (6'4, 320); 25 – Steve Bolo Mboumoua – Junior (6'4, 285); 26 - Kamhariyan Johnson - Freshman (6'3, 260); 32 - Corey Howard Jr. - Freshman (6'6, 230); 41 - Jamarion Matthews - Freshman (6'3, 255); 44 - Nolan Wilson - Freshman (6'5, 250); 88 – Isaia Faga – Junior (6'2, 291); 90 – London Simmons – Sophomore (6'3, 305); 91 - Caleb Smith - Sophomore (6'5, 270); 92 – Jeremiah Beaman – Junior (6'4, 303); 93 - Malique Franklin - Freshman (6'5, 250); 94 – Edric Hill – Senior (6'3, 294); 95 - Leslie Black - Senior (6'5, 285); 99 – Terrance Green – Senior (6'5, 319)	Linebackers: 0 – Yhonzae Pierre – Senior (6'3, 253); 4 – Luke Metz – Sophomore (6'3, 210); 7 – Caleb Woodson – Senior (6'3, 230); 8 – Justin Hill – Sophomore (6'3, 220); 9 – Desmond Umeozulu – Senior (6'6, 255); 11 - Xavier Griffin - Freshman (6'4, 205); 15 – Duke Johnson – Sophomore (6'2, 205); 20 – Jah-Marien Latham – 6th year (6'3, 275); 23 – Cayden Jones – Junior (6'4, 210); 30 – Bubba Odom – Senior (6'4, 235); 34 - Zay Hall - Freshman (6'3, 225); 35 – Abudall Sanders Jr. – Sophomore (6'2, 210); 36 – QB Reese – Junior (6'4, 280); 39 – Jake Ivie – Senior (6'0, 205); 41 - Jamarion Matthews - Freshman (6'2, 252); 82 - Lane Whisenhunt - Senior (6'2, 225); Defensive backs: 2 – Zabien Brown – Junior (6'0, 180); 3 – Keon Sabb – 5th year (6'1, 208); 6 – Red Morgan – Junior (6'0, 175); 5 – Dijon Lee Jr. – Sophomore (6'4, 190); 10 - Jireh Edwards - Freshman (6'2, 210); 12 – Zavier Mincey – Junior (6'3, 180); 13 – Ivan Taylor – Sophomore (6'0, 175); 16 - Jorden Edmonds - Freshman (6'0, 205); 17 - Zyan Gibson - Freshman (6'0, 175); 18 – Bray Hubbard – Senior (6'2, 195); 19 – Chuck McDonald II – Sophomore (6'0, 185); 21 – Dre Kirkpatrick Jr – Junior (5'11, 192); 24 - Rihayel Kelley - Freshman (6'0, 175); 27 – Walter Sansing – Senior (5'10, 160); 28 – Carmelo O'Neal – Junior (6'4, 200); 29 - Nick Sherman - Junior (6'1, 200); 31 - George Branch II - Freshman (6'1, 180); 32 – Griffin Hanson – Sophomore (5'10, 160); 34 – London Hill – Junior (5'11, 180); 38 – Brody McCutcheon – Sophomore (6'1, 178)
Legend: (C) Team captain; (S) Suspended; (I) Ineligible; Injured; Redshirt
Source and player details, 2026 Alabama Crimson Tide Football Commits (08/04/2026):

=== Coaching staff ===
Alabama head coach Kalen DeBoer will enter his third season as the Crimson Tide's head coach for the 2026 season. He led the Crimson Tide to a 20–8 record and ReliaQuest Bowl appearance in his first season.

Name	Position	Consecutive season at Alabama in current position
Kalen DeBoer	Head coach	3rd
Ryan Grubb	Offensive coordinator	2nd
Bryan Ellis	Quarterbacks coach	1st
Derrick Nix	Wide receivers coach	1st
Kane Wommack	Defensive coordinator	3rd
Maurice Linguist	Co-defensive coordinator / Cornerbacks coach	3rd
Jason Jones	Safeties coach	2nd
Richard Owens	Tight ends coach	1st
Robert Gillespie	Assistant head coach / running backs coach	6th
Adrian Klemm	Offensive line coach	1st
Freddie Roach	Associate head coach / defensive line coach	7th
Chuck Morrell	Inside linebackers coach	3rd
Christian Robinson	Outside linebackers coach	3rd
Jay Nunez	Special teams coordinator	3rd
Brad Aoki	Pass game specialist	1st
David Ballou	Head Strength and conditioning coach	7th
Reference: 2026 Alabama Crimson Tide Football Media Guide

=== Depth chart ===
- Depth chart is a projection and is subject to change.

Defense
4-3

FS
Bray Hubbard
Zavier Mincey
-

WOLF	MIKE	STINGER
Yhonzae Pierre	Luke Metz	Caleb Woodson
Justin Hill	QB Reese	Xavier Griffin
Jah-Marien Latham	Abduall Sanders Jr.	-

SS
Keon Sabb
Dre Kirkpatrick Jr.
Ivan Taylor

CB
Zabien Brown
Zyan Gibson
-

DE	DT	DT	DE
Devan Thompkins	Terrance Green	Kedrick Bingley-Jones	Red Morgan
Desmond Umeozulu	London Simmons	Edric Hill	Chuck McDonald III
Fatutoa Henry	Isaia Faga	-	-

CB
Djion Lee Jr.
Carmelo O'Neal
-

Offense
Pro-style

WR
Ryan Coleman-Williams
Derek Meadows
-

WR
Lotzeir Brooks
Tyler Henderson
-

LT	LG	C	RG	RT
Jackson Lloyd	William Sanders	Racin Delgatty	Michael Carroll	Jayvin James
Tyrell Miller	Mal Walden Jr.	Casey Poe	Ethan Fields	Nick Brooks
-	Kaden Strayhorn	-	-	-

TE
Kaleb Edwards
Josh Ford
Danny Lewis Jr.

WR
Rico Scott
Cederian Morgan
-

QB
Keelon Russell
Austin Mack
Jett Thomalla

Key reserves
Offense (WR) Noah Rogers
Defense
Special teams
Out (indefinitely)
Out (season)
Out (suspended)
Out (retired)

RB
Daniel Hill
Trae'shawn Brown
Kevin Riley
EJ Crowell

Special teams
PK Conor Talty
PK Lorcan Quinn
P Alex Asparuhov
P Adam Watford
Anderson Green
KR Ryan Coleman-Williams
Rico Scott
PR Lotzeir Brooks
Trae'shawn Brown
Djion Lee Jr.
LS Ethan Stangle
Alex Rozier
H Alex Asparuhov

True Freshman
Double Position : *
projected Depth Chart Week 1 vs East Carolina

=== Injury report ===
Name	Position	Class	Injury	Duration
/	/	/	/	/

== Statistics ==
=== Scoring ===
==== Alabama vs. non-conference opponents ====
	1	2	3	4	Total
Opponents	14	7	10	8	39
Alabama	22	75	21	27	145

==== Alabama vs. SEC opponents ====
	1	2	3	4	Total
SEC opponents	36	43	39	18	136
Alabama	48	88	56	70	262

==== Alabama vs. all opponents ====
	1	2	3	4	Total
Opponents	50	50	49	26	175
Alabama	70	163	77	97	407

== Awards and honors ==
=== Regular season honors ===
SEC Weekly Honors
Date	Player	Class	Position	Honors	Ref.
September 14	Caleb Woodson	Sr.	LB	SEC Co-Defensive Player of the Week	
September 14	Luke Metz	So.	LB	SEC Co-Defensive Player of the Week	
September 14	Devan Thompkins	5th Yr.	DT	Big 12 Defensive Lineman Player of the Week	
September 21	Conor Talty	Sr.	PK	SEC Special Teams Player of the Week	
October 5	London Simmons	So.	DT	SEC Defensive Line Player of the Week	
October 5	Xavier Griffin	Fr.	LB	SEC Freshman Player of the Year	

National Weekly Honors
Date	Player	Class	Position	Honors	Source

=== Postseason honors ===
==== National awards ====
National Awards
Recipient	Award	Date awarded	Ref.

==== SEC Conference Individual Yearly awards ====
Southeastern Conference Individual Awards
Recipient	Award	Date awarded	Ref.

==== All-American honors ====
All-SEC
Player	Position	1st/2nd team
HM = Honorable mention. Source:

All-SEC Freshman
Player	Position
HM = Honorable mention. Source:

NCAA Recognized All-American Honors
Player	AP	AFCA	Athletic	Athlon	BR	CFN	CBS Sports	ESPN	FOX	FWAA	Phil Steele	TSN	SI	USAT	Walter Camp	Designation
The NCAA recognizes a selection to all five of the AFCA, FWAA and TSN first teams for unanimous selections and three of five for consensus selections. HM = Honorable mention. Source:

== After the season ==
=== NFL draft ===
The NFL draft will be held at National Mall in Washington, DC on April, 2027.

Crimson Tide who were picked in the 2027 NFL draft:

Round	Pick	Player	Position	NFL Team

== See also ==
- Alabama Crimson Tide football
