= Billy Puckett =

American football player (born 2007)

No. 15 – Mississippi State Bulldogs
- Position: Quarterback
- Class: Redshirt Freshman

Personal information
- Born: February 12, 2007 (age 19)
- Listed height: 6 ft 0 in (1.83 m)
- Listed weight: 180 lb (82 kg)

Career information
- High school: Jackson Preparatory (Flowood, Mississippi)
- College: Mississippi State (2025–present)
- Stats at ESPN

Parker "Billy" Puckett (born February 12, 2007) is an American college football quarterback who plays for the Mississippi State Bulldogs.

== Early life ==
Puckett was born on February 12, 2007, and was raised in Madison, Mississippi. As a child, Puckett's parents nicknamed him "billy goat" due to his large appetite. When Puckett played on a Little League Baseball team with three other children also named Parker, coaches and teammates began to call him "Billy" to differentiate him. Puckett briefly attended Jackson Academy before enrolling at Jackson Preparatory School, where he played football.

Puckett served as the backup quarterback for Jackson Prep in his sophomore year, during which they won the state championship. The following year, Puckett was named the starting quarterback and guided Jackson Prep to the state championship game, where they ultimately lost to Hartfield Academy. During his senior year, Puckett led Jackson Prep to its first district championship since 2017, and to a rematch with Hartfield in the state championship game, where they again lost. Puckett received scholarship offers from Millsaps College along with several junior colleges throughout high school, but instead chose to enroll at Mississippi State University and join their football team as a preferred walk-on.

== College career ==
Puckett redshirted his first year at Mississippi State and did not appear in any games.

The next year, Puckett emerged in a competition against AJ Swann for backup quarterback. Puckett made his collegiate debut against Louisiana–Monroe in a blowout win. In week 5 against Alabama, after starting quarterback Kamario Taylor exited the game due to injury, Puckett took over as quarterback. The following game against LSU, Puckett made his first career start, going 16 for 26 with 121 passing yards and one interception. Taylor returned as starting quarterback the next week against Oklahoma, but again left early with injuries; Puckett instead played most of the game, going 17 for 24 with 158 passing yards, one touchdown, and one interception. After the game, it was announced that Taylor would not play the rest of the year, renewing Puckett's quarterback competition against Swann, this time for the starting role. Swann was designated as the starter for the next game against Texas but was injured in the first half, causing Puckett to finish the game, going 3 of 10 for 22 yards. In week 11, against Auburn, Puckett again entered the game in lieu of an injured Swann, but after fumbling the ball in the second quarter, Puckett himself replaced by quarterback Brodie McWhorter. Puckett started the following game against Tennessee Tech, completing 17 of 25 passes for 232 yards, two touchdowns, and one interception, along with four rushes for 25 yards.

=== Statistics ===
Season	Team	Games			Passing								Rushing			
Season	Team	GP	GS	Record	Cmp	Att	Pct	Yds	Avg	TD	Int	Rtg	Att	Yds	Avg	TD
2025	Mississippi State	DNP														
2026	Mississippi State	7	2	1–1	71	113	62.8	690	6.1	3	3	117.4	43	122	2.8	0
Career		7	2	1−1	71	113	62.8	690	6.1	3	3	117.4	43	122	2.8	0
