= 2026 Mississippi State Bulldogs football team =

American college football season

2026 Mississippi State Bulldogs football
- Conference: Southeastern Conference
- Record: 5–6 (2–6 SEC)
- Head coach: Jeff Lebby (3rd season)
- Offensive scheme: Veer and shoot
- Defensive coordinator: Zach Arnett (4th season)
- Co-defensive coordinator: Matt Brock (2nd season)
- Base defense: 3–3–5
- Home stadium: Davis Wade Stadium

2026 Southeastern Conference football standings
	Conf.			Overall
Team	W		L	W		L
No. 1 Georgia y	8	–	1	10	–	1
No. 5 Texas	6	–	2	9	–	2
No. 9 Tennessee	6	–	2	9	–	2
No. 3 Alabama	6	–	2	9	–	2
No. 22 Oklahoma	5	–	3	7	–	4
No. 24 Florida	5	–	4	7	–	4
No. 16 Kentucky	5	–	4	7	–	4
No. 25 Ole Miss	4	–	4	7	–	4
Auburn	4	–	4	7	–	4
Missouri	4	–	4	7	–	4
No. 21 South Carolina	4	–	5	6	–	5
LSU	3	–	5	6	–	5
Mississippi State	2	–	6	5	–	6
Arkansas	2	–	6	4	–	7
Texas A&M	1	–	7	4	–	7
Vanderbilt	1	–	7	4	–	7
Championship: Georgia vs TBD
^ – College Football Playoff participant; $ – Conference champion; y – Championship game participant; As of November 22, 2026; Rankings from CFP rankings

The 2026 Mississippi State Bulldogs football team represents Mississippi State University in the Southeastern Conference (SEC) during the 2026 NCAA Division I FBS football season. The Bulldogs play their home games at Davis Wade Stadium, located in Starkville, Mississippi. Zach Arnett replaced Coleman Hutzler as defensive coordinator after Hutzler was fired following the 2025 season and received a position as Auburn's outside linebacker coach.

== Schedule ==
The SEC announced the 2026 football schedule on December 11, 2025. The Bulldogs will have 7 home games and 5 road games and will play against 9 SEC teams and 3 non-conference teams.

Date	Time	Opponent	Rank	Site	TV	Result	Attendance
September 5	6:30 p.m.	Louisiana–Monroe*		Davis Wade Stadium; Starkville, MS	ESPNU	W 62–13	48,771
September 12	2:30 p.m.	at Minnesota*		Huntington Bank Stadium; Minneapolis, MN	CBS	W 38–13	48,048
September 19	3:15 p.m.	at South Carolina		Williams–Brice Stadium; Columbia, SC	SECN	W 41–34	78,360
September 26	6:45 p.m.	No. 19 Missouri	No. 24	Davis Wade Stadium; Starkville, MS	SECN	W 31–24	60,417
October 3	11:00 a.m.	No. 7 Alabama	No. 16	Davis Wade Stadium; Starkville, MS (rivalry, SEC Nation)	ABC	L 23–56	60,417
October 17	11:00 a.m.	at No. 22 LSU	No. 16	Tiger Stadium; Baton Rouge, LA (rivalry)	ESPN	L 0–31	102,321
October 24	2:30 p.m.	Oklahoma		Davis Wade Stadium; Starkville, MS	SECN	L 15–23	49,224
October 31	6:30 p.m.	at No. 11 Texas		Darrell K Royal–Texas Memorial Stadium; Austin, TX	ESPN	L 3–31	103,586
November 7	3:15 p.m.	Vanderbilt^{†}		Davis Wade Stadium; Starkville, MS	SECN	L 23–25	48,904
November 14	3:15 p.m.	Auburn		Davis Wade Stadium; Starkville, MS	SECN	L 9–41	49,275
November 21	12:00 p.m.	No. 13 (FCS) Tennessee Tech*		Davis Wade Stadium; Starkville, MS	SECN+	W 34–16	41,121
November 27	11:00 a.m.	at Ole Miss		Vaught–Hemingway Stadium; Oxford, MS (Egg Bowl)	ABC		
*Non-conference game; ^{†}Homecoming; Rankings from AP Poll (and CFP Rankings, after November 3) – Released prior to game; All times are in Central time

== Rankings ==
Ranking movements Legend: ██ Increase in ranking ██ Decrease in ranking — = Not ranked RV = Received votes
	Week															
Poll	Pre	1	2	3	4	5	6	7	8	9	10	11	12	13	14	Final
AP	—	—	RV	24	16	17	16	RV	—	—	—	—	—			
Coaches	—	—	RV	RV	16	20	19	RV	—	—	—	—	—			
CFP	Not released									—	—	—				Not released

== Game summaries ==
=== vs. Louisiana–Monroe ===
Louisiana–Monroe Warhawks (0–0) at Mississippi State Bulldogs (0–0) – Game summary

Quarter	1	2	3	4	Total
Warhawks	0	3	10	0	13
Bulldogs	21	20	7	14	62

at Davis Wade Stadium • Starkville, Mississippi

- Date: September 5
- Game time: 6:30 p.m.
- Game weather: Clear • Temperature: 91 °F (33 °C) • Wind: SE 6 mph
- Game attendance: 48,711
- Referee: David Smith
- TV announcers (ESPNU): Doug Sherman, Tom Luginbill and Lauren Sisler

Game information

First quarter

- MSST – Sanfrisco Magee 6-yard pass from Kamario Taylor (Kyle Ferrie kick), 12:21. Bulldogs 7–0. Drive: 10 plays, 75 yards, 2:39.
- MSST – Zion Ragins 22-yard pass from Kamario Taylor (Kyle Ferrie kick), 10:20. Bulldogs 14–0. Drive: 3 plays, 34 yards, 0:32.
- MSST – Kamario Taylor 26-yard run (Kyle Ferrie kick), 5:58. Bulldogs 21–0. Drive: 7 plays, 78 yards, 2:32.

Second quarter

- ULM – Abram Murray 43-yard field goal, 14:56. Bulldogs 21–3. Drive: 14 plays, 50 yards, 6:02.
- MSST – Anthony Evans III 10-yard pass from Kamario Taylor (Kyle Ferrie kick), 13:15. Bulldogs 28–3. Drive: 7 plays, 75 yards, 1:41.
- MSST – Kyle Ferrie 26-yard field goal, 8:32. Bulldogs 31–3. Drive: 7 plays, 51 yards, 3:03.
- MSST – Kyle Ferrie 32-yard field goal, 3:59. Bulldogs 34–3. Drive: 11 plays, 66 yards, 2:59.
- MSST – Xavier Gayten 14-yard run (Kyle Ferrie kick), 0:35. Bulldogs 41–3. Drive: 7 plays, 80 yards, 1:17.

Third quarter

- MSST – Marquis Johnson 70-yard pass from Kamario Taylor (Kyle Ferrie kick), 13:36. Bulldogs 48–3. Drive: 2 plays, 70 yards, 0:14.
- ULM – Derrick Jameson 40-yard pass from Austin Carlisle (Abram Murray kick), 10:14. Bulldogs 48–10. Drive: 7 plays, 75 yards, 3:22.
- ULM – Abram Murray 52-yard field goal, 3:45. Bulldogs 48–13. Drive: 8 plays, 50 yards, 3:07.

Fourth quarter

- MSST – J.J. Hill 57-yard run (Kyle Ferrie kick), 7:50. Bulldogs 55–13. Drive: 4 plays, 78 yards, 1:32.
- MSST – J.J. Hill 8-yard run (Kyle Ferrie kick), 2:44. Bulldogs 62–13. Drive: 7 plays, 69 yards, 3:49.

Statistics	ULM	MSST
First downs	14	35
Plays–yards	68–278	79–762
Rushes–yards	40–138	37–345
Passing yards	140	417
Passing: comp–att–int	16–28–0	27–42–0
Turnovers	0	0
Time of possession	31:47	28:13

Team	Category	Player	Statistics
Louisiana–Monroe	Passing	Austin Carlisle	6/10, 73 yards, TD
Louisiana–Monroe	Rushing	Austin Carlisle	7 carries, 50 yards
Louisiana–Monroe	Receiving	Derrick Jameson	1 reception, 40 yards, TD
Mississippi State	Passing	Kamario Taylor	22/34, 354 yards, 4 TD
Mississippi State	Rushing	J.J. Hill	7 carries, 118 yards, 2 TD
Mississippi State	Receiving	Anthony Evans III	7 receptions, 118 yards, TD

=== at Minnesota ===
Mississippi State Bulldogs (1–0) at Minnesota Golden Gophers (1–0) – Game summary

Quarter	1	2	3	4	Total
Bulldogs	14	14	3	7	38
Golden Gophers	3	3	7	0	13

at Huntington Bank Stadium • Minneapolis, Minnesota

- Date: September 12
- Game time: 2:30 p.m. CDT
- Game weather: Sunny • Temperature: 73 °F (23 °C) • Wind: NW 11 mph
- Game attendance: 48,048
- Referee: Steve Marlowe
- TV announcers (CBS): Brad Nessler, Charles Davis and Jenny Dell

Game information

First quarter

- MSST – Zion Ragins 22-yard pass from Kamario Taylor (Kyle Ferrie kick), 13:12. Bulldogs 7–0. Drive: 5 plays, 75 yards, 1:48.
- MINN – Luke Drzewiecki 44-yard field goal, 2:58. Bulldogs 7–3. Drive: 16 plays, 58 yards, 10:11.
- MSST – Fluff Bothwell 5-yard run (Kyle Ferrie kick), 0:22. Bulldogs 14–3. Drive: 9 plays, 75 yards, 2:36.

Second quarter

- MSST – Sanfrisco Magee 30-yard pass from Kamario Taylor (Kyle Ferrie kick), 11:27. Bulldogs 21–3. Drive: 7 plays, 72 yards, 2:38.
- MSST – Anthony Evans III 15-yard pass from Kamario Taylor (Kyle Ferrie kick), 4:32. Bulldogs 28–3. Drive: 12 plays, 76 yards, 5:03.
- MINN – Luke Drzewiecki 41-yard field goal, 0:00. Bulldogs 28–6. Drive: 11 plays, 52 yards, 4:32.

Third quarter

- MINN – Aydan West 0-yard fumble recover (Luke Drzewiecki kick), 11:01. Bulldogs 28–13.
- MSST – Kyle Ferries 52-yard field goal, 9:53. Bulldogs 31–13. Drive: 6 plays, 41 yards, 1:08.

Fourth quarter

- MSST – Fluff Bothwell 3-yard run (Kyle Ferrie kick), 12:32. Bulldogs 38–13. Drive: 10 plays, 96 yards, 4:58.

Statistics	MSST	MINN
First downs	28	18
Plays–yards	68–479	63–292
Rushes–yards	46–252	15–13
Passing yards	227	279
Passing: comp–att–int	16–22–0	31–48–0
Turnovers	1	0
Time of possession	30:15	29:45

Team	Category	Player	Statistics
Mississippi State	Passing	Kamario Taylor	16/22, 227 yards, 3 TD
Mississippi State	Rushing	Fluff Bothwell	18 carries, 103 yards, 2 TD
Mississippi State	Receiving	Anthony Evans III	7 receptions, 121 yards, TD
Minnesota	Passing	Drake Lindsey	31/48, 279 yards
Minnesota	Rushing	Darius Taylor	6 carries, 15 yards
Minnesota	Receiving	Noah Jennings	7 receptions, 88 yards

=== at South Carolina ===
Mississippi State Bulldogs (2–0) at South Carolina Gamecocks (2–0) – Game summary

Quarter	1	2	3	4	Total
Bulldogs	0	14	17	10	41
Gamecocks	13	10	0	11	34

at Williams–Brice Stadium • Columbia, South Carolina

- Date: September 19
- Game time: 5:35 p.m.
- Game weather: Cloudy • Temperature: 89 °F (32 °C) • Wind: NE 6 mph (9.7 km/h)
- Game attendance: 78,360
- Referee: Jeff Heaser
- TV announcers (SECN): Matt Schumacker, Aaron Murray and Taylor Davis
- Report: Official report

Statistics	MSST	SC
First downs	19	21
Plays–yards	61–393	79–431
Rushes–yards	34–135	39–149
Passing yards	258	282
Passing: comp–att–int	19–27–1	25–40–2
Time of possession	25:45	34:15

Team	Category	Player	Statistics
Mississippi State	Passing	Kamario Taylor	18/26, 251 yards, 4 TD, INT
Mississippi State	Rushing	Fluff Bothwell	21 carries, 116 yards
Mississippi State	Receiving	Zion Ragins	2 receptions, 61 yards, TD
South Carolina	Passing	LaNorris Sellers	25/40, 282 yards, 2 TD, 2 INT
South Carolina	Rushing	Matt Fuller	17 carries, 73 yards, TD
South Carolina	Receiving	Matt Fuller	7 receptions, 85 yards, TD

=== vs. No. 19 Missouri ===
No. 19 Missouri Tigers (3–0) at No. 24 Mississippi State Bulldogs (3–0) – Game summary

Quarter	1	2	3	4	Total
No. 19 Tigers	0	10	14	0	24
No. 24 Bulldogs	14	0	3	14	31

at Davis Wade Stadium • Starkville, Mississippi

- Date: September 26
- Game time: 6:45 pm
- Game weather: Clear • Temperature: 77 °F (25 °C) • Wind: NE 3 mph (4.8 km/h)
- Game attendance: 60,417
- Referee: James Carter
- TV announcers (SECN): Matt Schumacker, Aaron Murray, and Taylor Davis

Game information

First quarter
Second quarter
Third quarter
Fourth quarter

Statistics	MIZ	MSST
First downs	23	27
Plays–yards	75–414	78–499
Rushes–yards	35–119	40–139
Passing yards	295	360
Passing: comp–att–int	23–40–0	27–38–1
Turnovers	0	1
Time of possession	31:36	28:24

Team	Category	Player	Statistics
Missouri	Passing	Austin Simmons	23/39, 295 yards, 3 TD
Missouri	Rushing	Jamal Roberts	26 carries, 95 yards
Missouri	Receiving	Cayden Lee	11 receptions, 156 yards, 2 TD
Mississippi State	Passing	Kamario Taylor	27/38, 360, 3 TD, INT
Mississippi State	Rushing	Fluff Bothwell	25 carries, 122 yards, TD
Mississippi State	Receiving	Anthony Evans III	8 receptions, 114 yards

=== vs. No. 7 Alabama (rivalry) ===
No. 7 Alabama Crimson Tide (4–0) at No. 16 Mississippi State Bulldogs (4–0) – Game summary

Quarter	1	2	3	4	Total
No. 7 Crimson Tide	14	14	14	14	56
No. 16 Bulldogs	7	10	6	0	23

at Davis Wade Stadium • Starkville, Mississippi

- Date: October 3
- Game time: 11:00 am
- Game weather: Sunny • Temperature: 82 °F (28 °C) • Wind: E at 4 miles per hour (6.4 km/h)
- Game attendance: 60,417
- Referee: Adam Savoie
- TV announcers (ABC): Sean McDonough, Greg McElroy, and Katie George

Game information

First quarter
Second quarter
Third quarter
Fourth quarter

Statistics	ALA	MSST
First downs	22	21
Plays–yards	61–483	70–302
Rushes–yards	37–179	30–18
Passing yards	304	284
Passing: comp–att–int	18–24–0	22–40–2
Turnovers	4	2
Time of possession	25:19	34:41

Team	Category	Player	Statistics
Alabama	Passing	Keelon Russell	16/22, 285 yards, 3 TD
Alabama	Rushing	Trae'shawn Brown	14 carries, 66 yards, 2 TD
Alabama	Receiving	Lotzeir Brooks	4 receptions, 96 yards
Mississippi State	Passing	Kamario Taylor	19/34, 258 yards, 3 TD, 2 INT
Mississippi State	Rushing	Kolin Wilson	10 carries, 27 yards
Mississippi State	Receiving	Anthony Evans III	12 receptions, 166 yards, 2 TD

=== at No. 22 LSU (rivalry) ===
NO. 16 Mississippi State Bulldogs (4–1) at No. 22 LSU Tigers (4–2) – Game summary

Quarter	1	2	3	4	Total
No. 16 Bulldogs	0	0	0	0	0
No. 22 Tigers	14	7	10	0	31

at Tiger Stadium • Baton Rouge, Louisiana

- Date: October 17
- Game time: 11:07 a.m. CDT
- Game weather: Clear • Temperature: 63 °F (17 °C) • Wind: NE at 18 miles per hour (29 km/h)
- Game attendance: 102,321
- Referee: Steve Marlowe
- TV announcers (ESPN): Roy Philpott, Brock Osweiler, and Stormy Buonantony

Game information

First quarter
Second quarter
Third quarter
Fourth quarter

Statistics	MSST	LSU
First downs	18	28
Plays–yards	68–291	69–379
Rushes–yards	42–170	31–90
Passing yards	121	289
Passing: comp–att–int	16–26–1	31–38–0
Turnovers	1	1
Time of possession	30:11	29:49

Team	Category	Player	Statistics
Mississippi State	Passing	Billy Puckett	16/26, 121 yards, INT
Mississippi State	Rushing	Kolin Wilson	18 carries, 71 yards
Mississippi State	Receiving	Anthony Evans III	7 receptions, 40 yards
LSU	Passing	Sam Leavitt	31/38, 289 yards, 4 TD
LSU	Rushing	Dilin Jones	18 carries, 84 yards
LSU	Receiving	Jackson Harris	6 receptions, 85 yards, 2 TD

=== vs. Oklahoma ===
Oklahoma Sooners (3–3) at Mississippi State Bulldogs (4–2) – Game summary

Quarter	1	2	3	4	Total
Sooners	3	7	10	3	23
Bulldogs	0	0	7	8	15

at Davis Wade Stadium • Starkville, Mississippi

- Date: October 24
- Game time: 2:30 p.m. CDT
- Game weather: Sunny • 𝐓𝐞𝐦𝐩𝐞𝐫𝐚𝐭𝐮𝐫𝐞 78°F (26°C) • 𝐖𝐢𝐧𝐝 SE at 8 miles per hour (13 km/h)
- Game attendance: 49,224
- TV announcers (SECN): Dave Neal, Cole Cubelic, and Tori Petry

Game information

First quarter
Second quarter
Third quarter
Fourth quarter

Statistics	OU	MSST
First downs	21	17
Plays–yards	70–467	63–352
Rushes–yards	41–184	33–166
Passing yards	283	186
Passing: comp–att–int	22–29–0	20–30–1
Turnovers	1	2
Time of possession	33:16	26:44

Team	Category	Player	Statistics
Oklahoma	Passing	John Mateer	22/29, 283 yards, 2 TD
Oklahoma	Rushing	Tory Blaylock	12 carries, 71 yards
Oklahoma	Receiving	Isaiah Sategna III	8 receptions, 164 yards, 1 TD
Mississippi State	Passing	Billy Puckett	17/24, 158 yards, 1 TD, 1 INT
Mississippi State	Rushing	Fluff Bothwell	17 carries, 111 yards
Mississippi State	Receiving	Sanfrisco Magee	3 receptions, 65 yards, 1 TD

=== at No. 11 Texas ===
Mississippi State Bulldogs (4–3) at No. 11 Texas Longhorns (5–2) – Game summary

Quarter	1	2	3	4	Total
Bulldogs	0	0	3	0	3
No. 11 Longhorns	7	10	7	7	31

at Darrell K Royal–Texas Memorial Stadium • Austin, Texas

- Date: October 31
- Game time: 6:30 p.m.
- Game weather: Sunny • Temperature: 77 °F (25 °C) • Wind: E at 1 mile per hour (1.6 km/h)
- Game attendance: 103,586
- Referee: Kyle Olson
- TV announcers (ESPN): Joe Tessiore, Jesse Palmer and Kris Budden

Game information

First quarter

- (12:59) TEX — Cam Coleman 14-yard pass from Arch Manning (Gianni Spetic kick), (Drive: 4 plays, 62 yards, 1:55; TEX 7-0)

Second quarter

- (5:41) TEX — Gianni Spetic 45-yard field goal (Drive: 13 plays, 52 yards, 6:51; TEX 10-0)
- (1:13) TEX — Maraad Watson 61-yard fumble return (Gianni Spetic kick), (Drive: 4 plays, 7 yards, 0:30; TEX 17-0)

Third quarter

- (8:58) MISS — Kyle Ferrie 30-yard field goal (Drive: 6 plays, 16 yards, 2:53; TEX 17-3)
- (5:35) TEX — Raleek Brown 4-yard pass from Arch Manning (Gianni Spetic kick), (Drive: 7 plays, 75 yards, 3:23; TEX 24-3)

Fourth quarter

- (7:56) TEX — Emmett Mosley V 42-yard pass from Arch Manning (Gianni Spetic kick), (Drive: 5 plays, 62 yards, 2:23; TEX 31-3)

Statistics	MSST	TEX
First downs	12	13
Plays–yards	67–187	53–280
Rushes–yards	41–68	32–60
Passing yards	119	220
Passing: comp–att–int	15–25–0	17–21–0
Turnovers	1	1
Time of possession	32:28	27:32

Team	Category	Player	Statistics
Mississippi State	Passing	AJ Swann	12/15, 97 yards
Mississippi State	Rushing	Fluff Bothwell	17 carries, 49 yards
Mississippi State	Receiving	Marquis Johnson	6 receptions, 61 yards
Texas	Passing	Arch Manning	16/20, 220 yards, 3 TD
Texas	Rushing	Raleek Brown	8 carries, 30 yards
Texas	Receiving	Emmett Mosley V	4 receptions, 98 yards, TD

=== vs. Vanderbilt ===
Vanderbilt Commodores (3–5) at Mississippi State Bulldogs (4–4) – Game summary

Quarter	1	2	3	4	Total
Commodores	3	13	3	6	25
Bulldogs	0	0	14	9	23

at Davis Wade Stadium • Starkville, Mississippi

- Date: November 7
- Game time: 3:15 p.m.
- Game attendance: 48,904
- TV announcers (SECN): Dave Neal, Cole Cubelic, and Tori Petry

Game information

First quarter
Second quarter
Third quarter
Fourth quarter

Statistics	VAN	MSST
First downs		
Plays–yards		
Rushes–yards		
Passing yards		
Passing: comp–att–int		
Turnovers		
Time of possession		

Team	Category	Player	Statistics
Vanderbilt	Passing		
Vanderbilt	Rushing		
Vanderbilt	Receiving		
Mississippi State	Passing		
Mississippi State	Rushing		
Mississippi State	Receiving		

=== vs. Auburn ===
Auburn Tigers (5–4) at Mississippi State Bulldogs (4–5) – Game summary

Quarter	1	2	3	4	Total
Tigers	10	17	14	0	41
Bulldogs	0	7	0	2	9

at Davis Wade Stadium • Starkville, Mississippi

- Date: November 14
- Game time: 3:15 p.m.
- Game weather: Sunny • Temperature: 56 °F (13 °C) • Wind: NE 6 miles per hour (9.7 km/h)
- Game attendance: 49,275
- Referee: David Smith
- TV announcers (SECN): Lowell Galindo, Kirk Morrison and Dawn Davenport

Game information

First quarter

- AUB – Keshaun Singleton 26-yard pass from Byrum Brown (Alex McPherson kick), 8:39. Auburn 7–0. Drive: 3 plays, 38 yards, 0:50.
- AUB – Alex McPherson 37-yard field goal, 1:44. Auburn 10–0. Drive: 10 plays, 61 yards, 4:06.

Second quarter

- MSST – Sanfrisco Magee 34-yard pass from AJ Swann (Kyle Ferrie kick), 14:51. Auburn 10–7. Drive: 6 plays, 75 yards, 1:53.
- AUB – Byrum Brown 1-yard rush (Alex McPherson kick), 6:52. Auburn 17–7. Drive: 1 play, 1 yards, 0:05.
- AUB – Jeremiah Cobb 10-yard rush (Alex McPherson kick), 4:23. Auburn 24–7. Drive: 4 plays, 21 yards, 1:31.
- AUB – Alex McPherson 31-yard field goal, 0:00. Auburn 27–7. Drive: 8 plays, 33 yards, 1:21.

Third quarter

- AUB – Chas Nimrod 35-yard pass from Byrum Brown (Alex McPherson kick), 9:16. Auburn 34–7. Drive: 4 plays, 54 yards, 0:54.
- AUB – Keshaun Singleton 42-yard pass from Byrum Brown (Alex McPherson kick), 5:52. Auburn 41–7. Drive: 5 plays, 74 yards, 1:51.

Fourth quarter

- MSST – AUB safety, 13:54. Auburn 41–9.

Statistics	AUB	MSST
First downs	21	16
Plays–yards	71–371	74–262
Rushes–yards	43–142	46–46
Passing yards	229	216
Passing: comp–att–int	20–28–1	17–28–0
Turnovers	1	4
Time of possession	29:55	30:05

Team	Category	Player	Statistics
Auburn	Passing	Byrum Brown	19/26, 232 yards, 3 TD, INT
Auburn	Rushing	Jeremiah Cobb	10 rushes, 50 yards, TD
Auburn	Receiving	Keshaun Singleton	7 receptions, 103 yards, 2 TD
Mississippi State	Passing	Parker Puckett	10/14, 68 yards
Mississippi State	Rushing	Fluff Bothwell	12 rushes, 36 yards
Mississippi State	Receiving	Anthony Evans III	4 receptions, 89 yards

=== vs. No. 13 (FCS) Tennessee Tech ===
No. 13 (FCS) Tennessee Tech Golden Eagles (9–2) at Mississippi State Bulldogs (4–6) – Game summary

Quarter	1	2	3	4	Total
No. 13 (FCS) Golden Eagles	0	0	0	0	0
Bulldogs	0	0	0	0	0

at Davis Wade Stadium • Starkville, Mississippi

- Date: November 21

Game information

First quarter
Second quarter
Third quarter
Fourth quarter

Statistics	TNTC	MSST
First downs		
Plays–yards		
Rushes–yards		
Passing yards		
Passing: comp–att–int		
Turnovers		
Time of possession		

Team	Category	Player	Statistics
Tennessee Tech	Passing		
Tennessee Tech	Rushing		
Tennessee Tech	Receiving		
Mississippi State	Passing		
Mississippi State	Rushing		
Mississippi State	Receiving		

=== at Ole Miss (Egg Bowl) ===
Mississippi State Bulldogs (0–0) at Ole Miss Rebels (0–0) – Game summary

Quarter	1	2	3	4	Total
Bulldogs	0	0	0	0	0
Rebels	0	0	0	0	0

at Vaught–Hemingway Stadium • Oxford, Mississippi

- Date: November 27

Game information

First quarter
Second quarter
Third quarter
Fourth quarter

Statistics	MSST	MISS
First downs		
Plays–yards		
Rushes–yards		
Passing yards		
Passing: comp–att–int		
Turnovers		
Time of possession		

Team	Category	Player	Statistics
Mississippi State	Passing		
Mississippi State	Rushing		
Mississippi State	Receiving		
Ole Miss	Passing		
Ole Miss	Rushing		
Ole Miss	Receiving		

== Personnel ==
2026 Mississippi State Bulldogs football team roster
Players
Coaches
Offense

Pos.	#	Name	Class
WR	0	Gracen Harris	Fr
QB	1	Kamario Taylor	So
WR	2	Marquis Johnson	Sr
WR	3	Anthony Evans III	Sr
TE	4	Zayion Cotton	Fr
RB	5	Xavier Gayten	Jr
RB	6	Kolin Wilson	Fr
WR	7	Zion Ragins	So
QB	8	Jaden Rashada	Jr
WR	9	Camden Capehart	Fr
WR	10	Isaiah Mitchell	Fr
WR	11	Ayden Williams	Sr
WR	12	Matt Mayfield	Jr
WR	13	Sanfrisco Magee	So
QB	14	Brodie McWhorter	Fr
QB	15	Billy Puckett	Fr
QB	17	AJ Swann	Sr
TE	18	Riley Williams	Jr
WR	19	Junior Henderson	Fr
RB	21	J.J. Hill	Fr
RB	22	Brinston Williams	Sr
RB	24	Fluff Bothwell	Jr
RB	25	Cooper Crosby	Fr
OL	50	LJ Prudhomme	Fr
OL	54	Blake Steen	Jr
OL	55	Jakheem Shumpert	Jr
OL	56	Wesley Davis	Sr
OL	58	Miles McVay	Jr
OL	59	Tyler Miller	Fr
OL	60	Matthew Lefeau	Jr
OL	63	Mario Nash	Fr
OL	65	Spencer Dowland	Fr
OL	66	Ja'Elyne Matthews	Fr
OL	70	Breyden Turnage	Fr
OL	71	Saquon Miles	Jr
OL	72	Canon Boone	GS
IOL	73	Leon Noil Jr.	Fr
OL	75	Isaiah Dent	So
OL	76	Jayden Ross	Fr
OL	77	T. J. Lockhart	So
OL	78	DJ Chester	Jr
OT	79	Dalton Toothman	Fr
TE	84	Adam Land	Fr
TE	85	Luke Hutchinson	Fr
TE	87	Sam West	Jr
TE	88	Joeseph Skipworth	Fr
WR	89	Jessie Primer IV	Fr
OL		Jamari Freeman	Sr
WR		Fisher Southall	Fr
OT		Kison Shepard	Jr
WR		Jayden Cration	Fr
WR		Zion Crumpton	Fr
OL		Dylan Steen	Fr

Defense

Pos.	#	Name	Class
LB	0	Fatt Forrest	So
CB	1	Kelley Jones	Jr
S	2	Isaac Smith	Sr
S	3	Kendel Dolby	GS
EDGE	4	Amaree Williams	Jr
S	5	Jardin Gilbert	GS
S	6	Bralan Womack	Fr
LB	7	Zakari Tillman	Sr
CB	8	Kaylib Singleton	Fr
DL	9	Jaray Bledsoe	Sr
LB	10	Jalen Smith	Jr
LB	11	Tyler Lockhart	So
LB, S	12	Ja'Bryis Stewart	Jr
LB	13	LaKendrick James	Jr
DL	14	Dealyn Evans	So
S	15	Marcus Williams	Sr
LB	16	Derion Gullette	Jr
CB	17	Kyle Johnson	Fr
S	18	Sekou Smith Jr.	Fr
JACK	19	Micah Nickerson	Fr
CB	20	Amarien Jefferson	Jr
S	21	Dre Riley	Jr
ATH	22	Jayytee Taylor	Fr
DL	23	Trevion Williams	Jr
CB	24	Quentin Taylor	So
S	25	Kolby Barrett	Fr
CB	26	Jamroc Grimsley	So
S	28	Tanner Johnson	Sr
S	29	Jatavious Johnson	So
CB	30	Camron Brown	Fr
LB	32	AJ Rice	Fr
S	34	Vic Sutton	Jr
DL	35	Kalvin Dinkins	Sr
CB	38	Jaylen Antoine	Fr
DE	40	Gus Cordova	Fr
LB	41	Tyshun Willis	Fr
DL	42	Darron Reed Jr.	Jr
DL	43	Will Whitson	GS
LB	44	Gav Holman	So
DB	47	Sean Pleasant	Fr
DL	55	Collin Coates	Jr
DL	88	Tico Crittendon Jr.	Fr
DL	90	Davon Young	Fr
DL	92	Kaleb Morris	Fr
DL	97	Jayson Jenkins	Sr
DL	99	Jamarcus Moye	Sr
LB		James Heard Jr.	Jr
CB		Dre Otey	Fr
S		Terrance Love	Jr
DL		Lorenz Cammon	Jr
DL		Douglas Adams III	Jr
EDGE		Shawn Gee	So
S		Antavious Watts	Fr
CB		Terrell Johnson Jr.	Fr
JACK		Chris Addison	Fr

Special teams

Pos.	#	Name	Class
LS	39	Kallen Cosper	Fr
LS	46	Kyle Rushing	Fr
K	47	William Wilkinson	So
K	48	Hayden Chambers	Fr
K	80	Kyle Ferrie	Sr
P	88	Ethan Pulliam	Jr
K, P		Oisin Flynn	Fr

Head coach

- Jeff Lebby

Coordinators/assistant coaches

- Philip Montgomery
  Associate head coach for offense/wide receivers
- Anthony Tucker
  Assistant head coach/Pass game coordinator/Running backs
- Zach Arnett
  Defensive coordinator
- Matt Barnes
  Co-defensive coordinator/Linebackers
- Corey Bell
  Cornerbacks
- Jon Cooper
  Run game coordinator/Tight ends
- Vincent Dancy
  Defensive ends/Outside linebackers
- Kevin Johns
  Quarterbacks
- Phil Loadholt
  Offensive line
- Cliff Odom
  Special teams coordinator
- Evan Harvey
  Safeties
- Kevie Thompson
  Defensive backs/nickels
- Ty Warren
  Defensive line
- Paul Rhoads
  Senior defensive analyst
- David Turner
  Senior defensive line consultant
- Ryan McKim
  Director of advanced scouting and special projects
- Desmond Lindsey
  Assistant wide receivers
- Jermauria Rasco
  Assistant defensive line
- Joey Connors
  Assistant special teams
- Tanner Schafer
  Quarterback analyst
- Ben Tawwater
  Offensive line analyst
- Mason Miller
  Offensive line consultant
- Brandon Fusco
  Offensive line analyst
- Dalton White
  Offensive analyst
- Nick Licostie
  Defensive analyst
- Chad Stalnaker
  Defensive analyst
- Erroll Thompson
  Linebacker analyst
- Jett Johnson
  Linebacker analyst
- Nate Klein
  Offensive fellow
- Hayes Hammond
  Special teams fellow
- Shaud Williams
  Head strength and conditioning

Legend

- (C) Team captain
- (S) Suspended
- (I) Ineligible
- Injured
- Redshirt

Roster
Last update: June 19, 2026
