= Bray Hubbard =

American football player

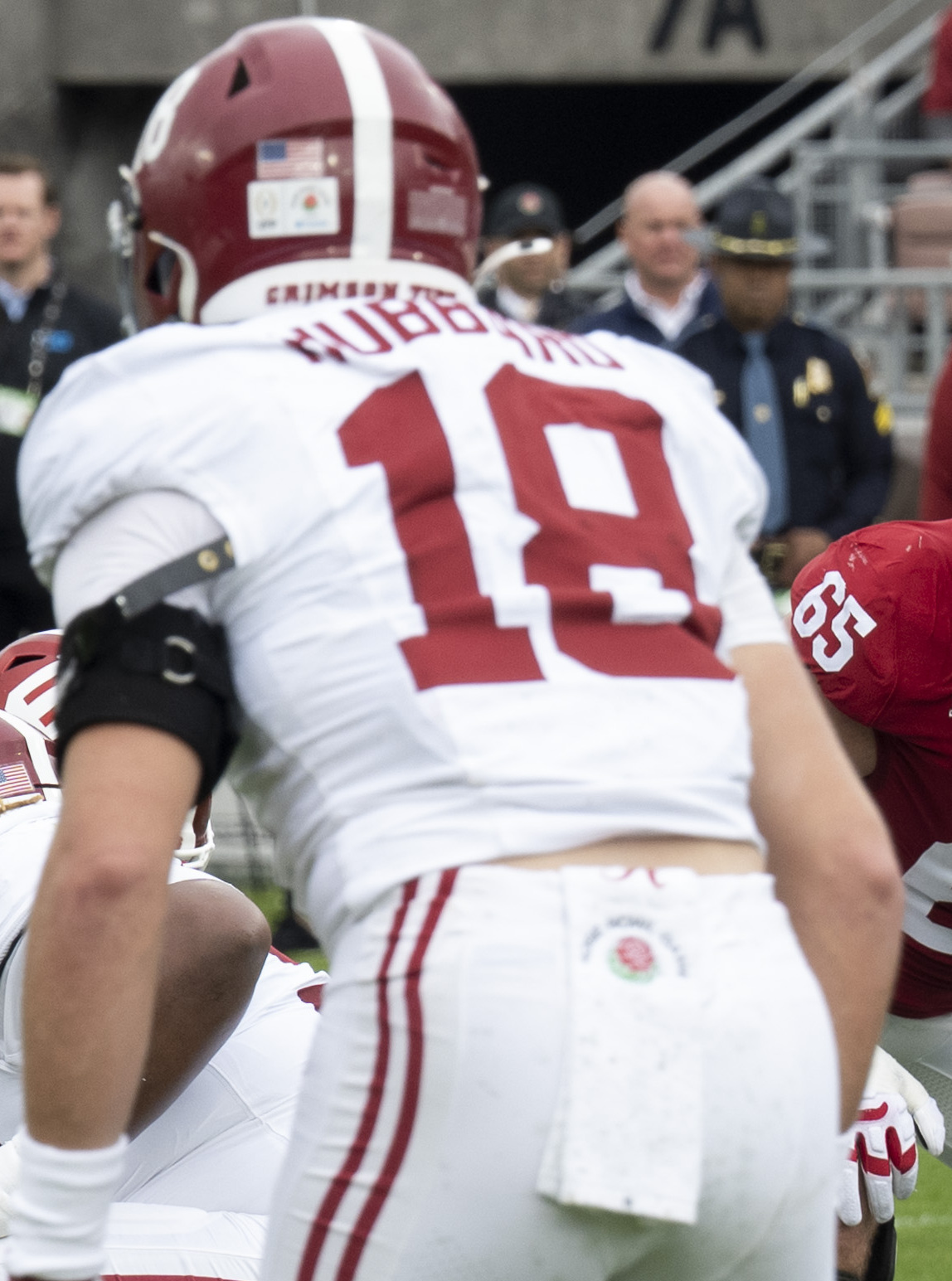
- Hubbard in 2026

No. 18 – Alabama Crimson Tide
- Position: Safety
- Class: Senior

Personal information
- Born: February 14, 2005 (age 21); Ocean Springs, Mississippi, U.S.
- Listed height: 6 ft 2 in (1.88 m)
- Listed weight: 217 lb (98 kg)

Career information
- High school: Ocean Springs
- College: Alabama (2023–present)

Awards and highlights
- First-team All-SEC (2025)
- Stats at ESPN

Brayson "Bray" Hubbard (born February 14, 2005) is an American college football safety for the Alabama Crimson Tide.

== Early life ==
Hubbard was born in Ocean Springs, Mississippi and attended Ocean Springs High School. He was rated as a three-star recruit and committed to play college football for the Alabama Crimson Tide over offers from FAU, Mississippi State, Navy, Tulane, and Southern Miss.

== College career ==
As a freshman in 2023, Hubbard appeared in nine games for Alabama, notching one tackle. In week 8 of the 2024 season, he notched nine tackles in a 24–17 loss to Tennessee, after replacing injured starter Keon Sabb. Heading into week 9, Hubbard was named the team's starting safety due to Sabb's injury. In his first career start, he totaled seven tackles and an interception in a win over Missouri. Hubbard went viral for jogging during a play that resulted in a touchdown versus Florida State in 2025.
