= Larry Grant (American football) =

American football player (born 1985)

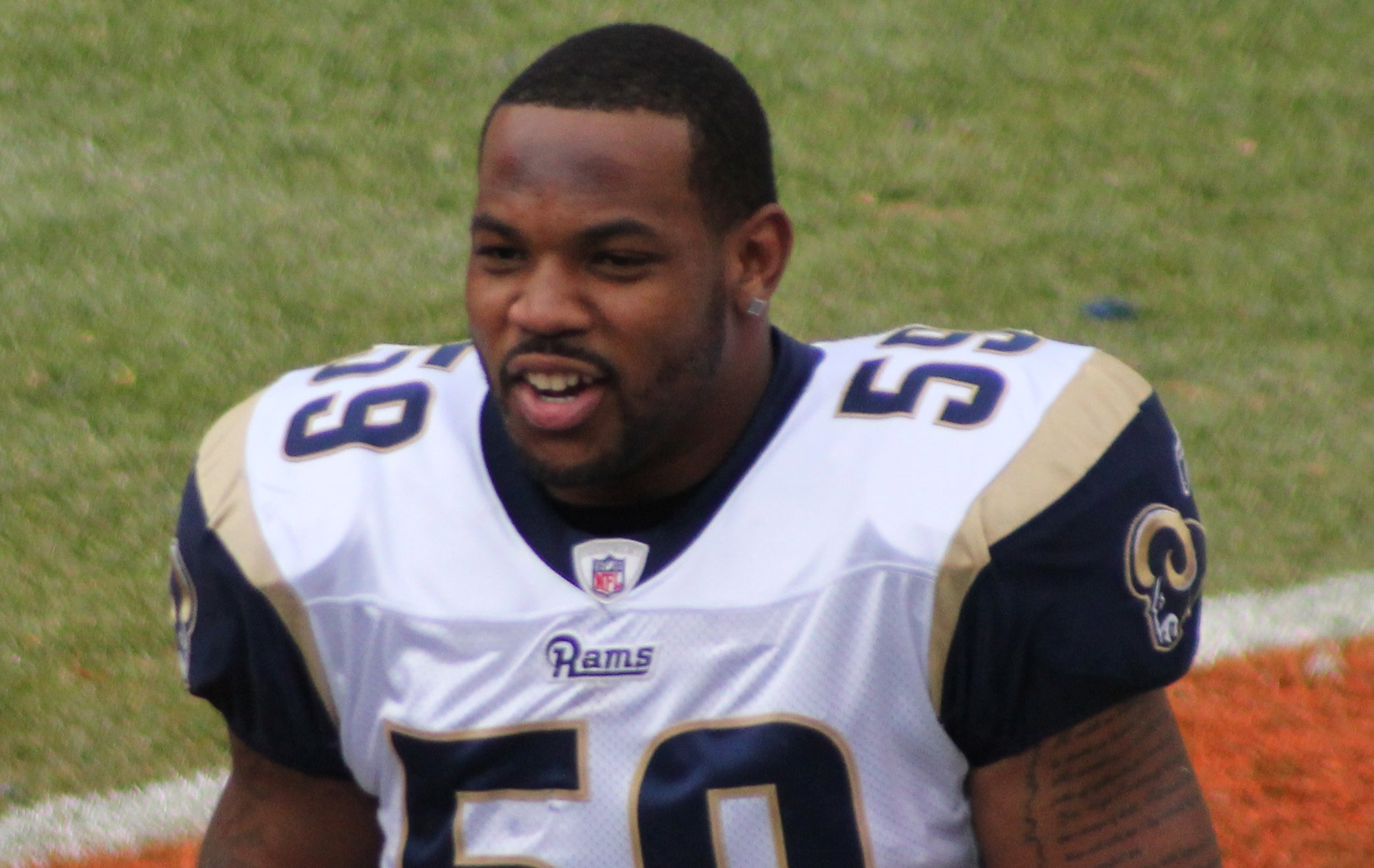
- Grant with the St. Louis Rams in 2010

Columbus Aviators
- Title: Linebackers coach

Personal information
- Born: February 16, 1985 (age 41); Santa Rosa, California, U.S.
- Listed height: 6 ft 1 in (1.85 m)
- Listed weight: 251 lb (114 kg)

Career information
- Position: Linebacker (No. 59, 54, 95)
- High school: Norcross (Norcross, Georgia)
- College: Ohio State
- NFL draft: 2008: 7th round, 214th overall pick

Career history

Playing
- San Francisco 49ers (2008)*; St. Louis Rams (2008−2010); San Francisco 49ers (2011−2012); Chicago Bears (2013); Cleveland Browns (2014)*
- * Offseason or practice squad member only

Coaching
- UNLV (2021) Defensive analyst; Columbus Aviators (2026−present) Linebackers coach

Awards and highlights
- NJCAA Defensive P.O.Y. (2005); First-team NJCAA All-American (2005)

Career NFL statistics
- Total tackles: 95
- Sacks: 5
- Forced fumbles: 4
- Stats at Pro Football Reference

Larry James Grant (born February 16, 1985) is an American former professional football linebacker who is currently the linebackers coach for the Columbus Aviators of the United Football League (UFL). He played college football for the Ohio State Buckeyes and was selected by the San Francisco 49ers in the seventh round of the 2008 NFL draft. Grant also played for the St. Louis Rams and Chicago Bears.

== Early life ==
Grant began during his freshman year at Foothill High School in Sacramento, California, where he lettered as a running back and safety (gridiron football position) safety. He then moved to Georgia, attending Meadowcreek High School in Norcross, Georgia, for his sophomore and junior years. Grant then transferred to Norcross High School as a senior and lettered as a tailback, rushing for 450 yards with six touchdowns on only 35 carries (12.9 avg) during his senior campaign. He then left Norcross High in the winter, moving back to California, where he re-enrolled and graduated from Foothill High School.

== College career ==
Grant attended City College of San Francisco before finishing his career at Ohio State. In 2005, Larry was named JUCO National Player of the Year. He played in four straight national championship games (two at City College and two at Ohio State). For his entire collegiate career, Grant started 38 of 49 games he played in, registering 244 tackles (162 solos) with 15.5 sacks and 30.5 stops for losses and caused eight fumbles, recovered three others and had nine pass break-ups, Also, he gained 131 yards on eight interception returns and blocked 15 kicks, returning three blocked punts for a total of 84 yards and a touchdown. Following the season, Grant was named the No. 1 junior college prospect from the state of California by JCGridiron.com.

In 25 games at Ohio State, Grant started 14 contests. He recorded 69 tackles (43 solos) with 5.5 sacks for minus-34 yards and 10 stops for losses of 45 yards. He caused a fumble, deflected three passes and intercepted two others for 68 yards in returns. He also blocked three kicks, returning two errant punts for a total of 17 yards. In 24 games at the City College of San Francisco, Grant recorded 175 tackles (119 solos) with 10 sacks and 20.5 stops for losses, as he caused seven fumbles, recovered three others and deflected six passes and also gained 63 yards with a touchdown on six interceptions and set both California junior college and NJCAA career records with 12 blocked kicks, scoring on a 65-yard punt runback. He was a two-time All-Region I, All-COA, All-California and All-NorCal Football Conference selection, adding NJCAA National Defensive Player of the Year, California Junior College Player of the Year and NJCAA First-team All-American honors as a senior while playing at City College of San Francisco (2004–05).

In 2007 at Ohio State, he started all 13 games, recording 51 tackles (35 solo, 16 assisted) along with 9.5 tackles for loss, and one interception that he returned for 19 yards and had Ohio State’s only two blocked kicks of the season. In 2006 at OSU he played in 12 games and started one game and collected 18 tackles on the season and blocked a punt and intercepted pass. In 2005 at the City College of San Francisco he recorded 85 tackles (56 solos) with four sacks and nine stops for losses, caused three fumbles, recovered another and broke up four passes, intercepted 6 passes and also blocked six punts. In 2004, he had 90 tackles (63 solos) with six sacks and 11.5 stops for losses, as he also broke up two passes and blocked six punts, and recovered two fumbles and caused four others

== Professional career ==
Pre-draft measurables
Height	Weight	40-yard dash	10-yard split	20-yard split	20-yard shuttle	Three-cone drill	Vertical jump	Broad jump	Bench press	Wonderlic
6 ft 1 in (1.85 m)	235 lb (107 kg)	4.65 s	1.55 s	2.66 s	4.22 s	6.77 s	31 1/2 in (0.80 m)	9 ft 5 in (2.87 m)	20 reps	20
All values from NFL Combine, except 40-yd dash and splits, which are from Ohio State Pro Day

=== San Francisco 49ers (first stint) ===
Grant was selected by the San Francisco 49ers in the seventh round with the 214th overall pick in the 2008 NFL draft.

=== St. Louis Rams ===
He was signed by the St. Louis Rams at the end of the 2008 season from the 49ers practice squad. In 2010 Grant earned the starting weakside linebacker position for the Rams and ended up losing the position to Chris Chamberlain late in the season.

=== San Francisco 49ers (second stint) ===
Grant re-signed with the 49ers on July 30, 2011. He would start 3 games at Inside Linebacker for an injured Patrick Willis late in December and registered a career-high 39 tackles for the season. At the end of the 2012 season, Grant and the 49ers appeared in Super Bowl XLVII. He contributed on special teams, but the 49ers fell to the Baltimore Ravens by a score of 34–31.

=== Chicago Bears ===
Grant signed with the Chicago Bears on October 28, 2013. The Bears released him on November 16, 2013.

=== Cleveland Browns ===
Grant signed with the Cleveland Browns on May 21, 2014. He was released by the team on June 6.

== Coaching career ==
He is the former head football coach at Paso Robles High School in California.

== Personal life ==
Grant's nephew is Alabama defensive tackle, Devan Thompkins.
