= Lorcan Quinn =

Northern Irish gridiron football player

No. 90 – Alabama Crimson Tide
- Position: Placekicker
- Class: Sophomore

Personal information
- Listed height: 6 ft 1 in (1.85 m)
- Listed weight: 196 lb (89 kg)

Career information
- College: Marshall (2025); Alabama (2026–present)

Awards and highlights
- First-team All-Sun Belt (2025)
- Stats at ESPN

Other information
- Gaelic games career
- Sport: Gaelic football
- Position: Goalkeeper
Club
- Years: Club
- Donaghmore St Patrick's GAC
Inter-county
- Years: County
- Tyrone
Inter-county titles
- All-Irelands: 1

Lorcan Quinn is a Northern Irish gridiron football placekicker for the Alabama Crimson Tide. He previously played for the Marshall Thundering Herd.

Quinn was formerly a Gaelic football goalkeeper for Donaghmore St Patrick's GAC and the Tyrone county team. He helped Tyrone win the 2021 All-Ireland Senior Football Championship after also winning titles with the under-17 and under-20 county teams.

== Early life and Gaelic football career ==
Quinn grew up playing association football and Gaelic football, initially leaning more towards the former before "before committing more to Gaelic" around the age of 15. His earliest memories of Gaelic football come from playing for St. Patrick's Primary School in his hometown of Donaghmore, County Tyrone. Quinn later attended St Patrick's Academy in the nearby town of Dungannon. He helped the school's Gaelic football team win the 2019 Brock Cup and reach three consecutive Ulster finals (Corn na n'Óg, Brock Cup, and Rannafast Cup). Quinn also participated in four editions of the MacRory Cup. He modeled his game after Rory Beggan.

Quinn, who played the goalkeeper position, represented Donaghmore St Patrick's GAC at club level. He was the starting goalkeeper for the Tyrone under-17 county team that won the inaugural All-Ireland Under-17 Football Championship in 2017. (Note: A one-off Under-17 competition was played in 2017 as a transitional tournament before the age limit of the All-Ireland Minor Football Championship was lowered from Under-18 to Under-17 in 2018.) Quinn helped the Tyrone under-20 county team win back-to-back Ulster Under-20 Football Championships in 2019 and 2020. He then served as the backup goalkeeper to Niall Morgan on the Tyrone county team that won the 2021 All-Ireland Senior Football Championship.

== College football career ==
=== Switching code ===
Before switching to American football, Quinn was laying telecommunications wires on roads in Northern Ireland for work in 2024. He started kicking to compete in Ireland's Kicking King, a competition organized by former rugby player-turned American football kicking coach Tadhg Leader which awarded NFL game tickets to the winner. Despite finishing in second place, Quinn's performance impressed Leader. "He was kicking 58- to 60-yard field goals and didn’t even know what that meant, 10 minutes into kicking an American football for the first time. It was a pretty freakish introduction", said Leader.

Quinn withdrew from the Tyrone GAA senior football panel in May 2024 to start training with Leader. In January 2025, he flew to Florida with several other Irish prospects to kick in front of American college football coaches. Quinn had an impressive performance at a kicking camp at IMG Academy, where he converted eight-of-eight field goal attempts, including a 69-yard kick. He was subsequently ranked as the best kicker available in the NCAA transfer portal by Kohl's Kicking. On 1 May 2025, Quinn announced that he had committed to playing NCAA Division I football at Marshall University for the Thundering Herd. He became the first All-Ireland winner to earn a scholarship to play American football.

=== Marshall ===
Quinn joined the Marshall Thundering Herd of the Sun Belt Conference for their 2025 season, putting on a helmet for the first time during fall camp. He was named the Sun Belt Special Teams Player of the Week in late October after he tied the program record with four field goals in a 40–37 double overtime win over Texas State. In his next game, Quinn converted a season-long 55-yard field goal in a loss to Coastal Carolina. It also marked the second-longest kick in school history.

In his first season of American football, Quinn converted 21-of-26 field goal attempts and 38-of-39 extra points, garnering first team All-Sun Belt honors. He set program records for most field goals made in a season and most career field goals of 50-plus yards. Quinn also added 71 kickoffs for 4,601 yards and 61 touchbacks. His 64.8 yards per kickoff ranked third in the FBS. After the season, Quinn entered the NCAA transfer portal. He was rated as a three-star transfer recruit and ranked as the 11th-best kicker in the portal by 247Sports.

=== Alabama ===
On 12 January 2026, Quinn committed to transferring to the University of Alabama to play for the Crimson Tide in the Southeastern Conference. He was brought onto the team to compete with starting kicker Conor Talty, who had struggled the previous season. The competition between the two extended throughout the entire preseason.

A week ahead of the 2026 season opener, it was announced that Talty would remain as the starter while Quinn was assigned kickoff duties.
