= Luke Metz =

American football linebacker

No. 4 – Alabama Crimson Tide
- Position: Linebacker
- Class: Sophomore

Personal information
- Listed height: 6 ft 3 in (1.91 m)
- Listed weight: 233 lb (106 kg)

Career information
- High school: Mill Creek (Hoschton, Georgia)
- College: Alabama (2025–present)
- Stats at ESPN

Luke Metz is an American football linebacker for the Alabama Crimson Tide.

== Early life ==
Metz attended Mill Creek High School in Hoschton, Georgia. During his junior season, he totaled 51 tackles, five sacks, and an interception. Metz was rated as a three-star recruit by 247Sports and committed to play college football for the Alabama Crimson Tide over offers from LSU, Michigan, and Ole Miss.

== College career ==
As a freshman during the 2025 season, Metz played in 15 games, recording seven tackles. Heading into the 2026 season, he was named a starting linebacker on the Crimson Tide defense alongside Caleb Woodson.
