= Marshall Pritchett =

American football player (born 2006)

No. 9 – Alabama Crimson Tide
- Position: Tight end
- Class: Sophomore

Personal information
- Born: January 24, 2006 (age 20)
- Listed height: 6 ft 5 in (1.96 m)
- Listed weight: 246 lb (112 kg)

Career information
- High school: Rabun Gap-Nacoochee (Rabun Gap, Georgia)
- College: Alabama (2025–present)
- Stats at ESPN

Marshall Pritchett (born January 24, 2006) is an American college football tight end for the Alabama Crimson Tide.

== Early life ==
Pritchett attended Rabun Gap-Nacoochee School in Rabun Gap, Georgia. He originally committed to the North Carolina Tar Heels, but Pritchett later flipped his commitment to play college football at the University of Alabama.

== College career ==
Pritchett received his first significant playing time against Eastern Illinois, recording four receptions for 33 yards in a win. He finished his freshman season in 2025 with seven receptions for 57 yards in 15 games. In week six of the 2026 season, Pritchett recorded two receptions for 32 yards and his first career touchdown in a 20–17 loss to No. 2 Georgia.

Season	Team	GP	Receiving			
Season	Team	GP	Rec	Yds	Avg	TD
2025	Alabama	15	7	57	8.1	0
2026	Alabama	6	9	180	20.0	1
Career		21	16	237	14.8	1

== Personal life ==
Pritchett is the son of former National Football League player Wes Pritchett, who played linebacker at Notre Dame.
