= Michael Carroll (offensive lineman) =

American football player (born 2007)

No. 64 – Alabama Crimson Tide
- Position: Offensive lineman
- Class: Sophomore

Personal information
- Born: 2007 (age 18–19)
- Listed height: 6 ft 6 in (1.98 m)
- Listed weight: 318 lb (144 kg)

Career information
- High school: La Salle College (Wyndmoor, Pennsylvania); Central Bucks East (Buckingham, Pennsylvania); IMG Academy (Bradenton, Florida)
- College: Alabama (2025–present)

Michael Carroll (born 2007) is an American college football offensive lineman for the Alabama Crimson Tide. He was a five-star recruit and one of the top prospects in the class of 2025.

== Early life ==
Carroll is from Doylestown, Pennsylvania. His mother played college basketball for the Michigan State Spartans, while his father played college football for the Penn State Nittany Lions. He grew up playing lacrosse but said he "kind of got too big" and switched to football as a freshman at La Salle College High School in Wyndmoor. A lineman in football, he was trained by former Canadian Football League player Mike Moosbrugger. He transferred to Central Bucks High School East as a junior.

Although Carroll only had one offer to play college football, from Temple, after his sophomore year, he had a breakout season as a junior and began receiving attention from major colleges. After his junior year at Central Bucks East, he transferred to IMG Academy in Bradenton, Florida, for his senior year in 2024. A five-star recruit, Carroll was ranked the top interior offensive lineman and a top-20 prospect nationally in the class of 2025. He committed to play college football for the Alabama Crimson Tide.

== College career ==
Carroll entered his true freshman season at Alabama in 2025 as a backup right tackle.
