= Millard South High School =

Location
- 14905 Q. St. Omaha, Nebraska; United States; 41°12′15″N 96°08′48″W

Information
- Established: 1970 as Millard High School
- School district: Millard Public Schools
- Principal: Heidi Weaver
- Teaching staff: 155.59 (FTE)
- Grades: 9–12
- Enrollment: 2,607 (2022–23)
- Student to teacher ratio: 16.71
- Colors: Red, white, and blue
- Mascot: Patriots
- Nickname: Indians (pre-2000), Patriots (post-2000)
- Rival: Millard West High School
- Website: mshs.mpsomaha.org

Millard South High School is a fully accredited public high school located in Omaha, Nebraska, United States. The school was established in 1970 as Millard High School. It is one of four high schools within the Millard Public School District.

Millard South is a member of the Nebraska School Activities Association. Athletic teams are known as the Patriots. The school colors are red, white and blue.

== Athletics ==
The Patriots have won a number of state championships, listed in the table below.

State championships
Season	Sport	Number of championships	Year
Fall	Football	4	1995, 2009, 2024, 2025
Fall	Cross country, boys'	2	2006, 2013
Fall	Golf, girls'	1	1978
Fall	Softball	6	2005, 2011, 2012, 2013, 2014, 2016
Winter	Wrestling	19	Individual Team: 2005, 2006, 2007, 2008, 2015, 2016, 2017, 2019, 2020, 2021, 2022, 2023 Dual Team: 2015, 2016, 2017, 2019, 2020, 2022, 2023
Winter	Basketball, boys'	5	1983, 1984, 1988, 1989, 1991
Winter	Basketball, girls'	4	1989, 1992, 1996, 2023
Spring	Track and field, boys'	1	1993
Spring	Track and field, girls'	1	1994
Spring	Cheerleading	5	2012, 2013, 2014, 2015, 2017
Spring	Baseball	3	1976, 1980, 2021
Spring	Soccer, boys'	1	2008
Total		49	

== 2011 shooting ==
On January 5, 2011, Robert Butler Jr., a 17-year-old senior at Millard South, was suspended that morning for trespassing on school grounds. He was involved in an incident in which he drove his car onto the school's football field on New Year's Day.

At 12:45 p.m., Butler returned to the school, armed with a Glock .40-caliber pistol that he had stolen from his father's cabinet, and signed in for an appointment with Kaspar. He then walked into her office and shot her. Moments later, principal Curtis Case ran out into the hallway and was shot several times in the chest and hip. Butler then walked into the front office area, firing randomly; gunshot debris caused minor injuries to the school nurse. Butler then left the school and drove 2 miles (3.2 km) to a nearby BP gas station, where he fatally shot himself inside his vehicle. It was later reported that Butler had consumed K2, a type of synthetic cannabis before the shootings.

During the shooting, Millard South went into a lockdown, which was later extended to include all 21,000 students in the Millard School District. Kaspar and Case were hospitalized at Saint Joseph Hospital at Creighton University Medical Center; several hours later, Kaspar died of multiple head and chest wounds. The shooting was the deadliest school shooting in Nebraska's history and the second such incident in the state's modern history, the first being a 1995 shooting in Chadron that left a teacher injured.

== Notable alumni ==
- Bruce Benedict, former MLB catcher for the Atlanta Braves
- Adam DeVine, actor and comedian
- Brian Duensing, baseball player (pitcher), 2008 USA Olympic Baseball team, Minnesota Twins
- Jake Ellenberger, professional mixed martial arts (MMA) fighter, signed with the Ultimate Fighting Championship
- Rick Heiserman, former MLB player (St. Louis Cardinals)
- Timothy J. Kadavy, United States Army Lieutenant General, former Adjutant General of the Nebraska National Guard, Director of the Army National Guard
- Ryan Krause, football player, San Diego Chargers
- Safi Rauf, Founder and President Human First coalition
- Tom Sawyer, Representative, Kansas Legislature
- Antrell Taylor, Collegiate wrestler, University of Nebraska, 2025 NCAA D1 National Champion, 157bs
- Jett Thomalla, college football quarterback for the Alabama Crimson Tide
