= Jireh Edwards =

American football player

No. 10 – Alabama Crimson Tide
- Position: Safety
- Class: Freshman

Personal information
- Listed height: 6 ft 2 in (1.88 m)
- Listed weight: 221 lb (100 kg)

Career information
- High school: St. Frances (Baltimore, Maryland)
- College: Alabama (2026–present)

Jireh Edwards is an American college football safety for the Alabama Crimson Tide.

== Early life ==
Edwards is from Upper Marlboro, Maryland. He first attended Rock Creek Christian Academy before transferring to Saint Frances Academy in Baltimore as a sophomore, where he became a top football safety. As a junior in 2024, he was named all-metro and a MaxPreps Junior All-American after posting 92 tackles, 17 tackles-for-loss (TFLs), six pass breakups and three forced fumbles. After his junior year, he competed at the Under Armour All-America Game.

As a senior in 2025, Edwards was one of the top players for a Saint Frances team that won the national championship. He totaled 167 tackles and six interceptions, including two interceptions returned for touchdowns. Edwards was named the Maryland Player of the Year by Gatorade, Rivals.com and MaxPreps. He was also selected to the USA Today All-USA High School Football Team.

A five-star recruit, Edwards was ranked a top-25 prospect nationally and the number one safety prospect in the class of 2026 by ESPN. He committed to play college football for the Alabama Crimson Tide.
