= Xavier Griffin =

American football player

No. 11 – Alabama Crimson Tide
- Position: Linebacker
- Class: Freshman

Personal information
- Born: Cullman, Alabama, U.S.
- Listed height: 6 ft 3 in (1.91 m)
- Listed weight: 222 lb (101 kg)

Career information
- High school: Gainesville (Gainesville, Georgia)
- College: Alabama (2026–present)

Xavier Griffin is an American college football linebacker for the Alabama Crimson Tide.

== Early life ==
Griffin was born in Cullman, Alabama. He attended Gainesville High School where he played football as a linebacker. He was also an all-region performer in basketball. As a sophomore in football, Griffin posted 54 tackles and 15 sacks. He then was named first-team all-state by the Atlanta Journal-Constitution in 2024 despite missing several games due to injury. He finished his junior season with 43 tackles, 13 tackles-for-loss and six sacks, with his 43 tackles placing third on the team. As a senior in 2025, Griffin recorded 78 tackles, 12 tackles-for-loss and four sacks. He was invited to the All-American Bowl at the conclusion of his high school career.

A five-star recruit, Griffin was ranked the number one linebacker and a top-20 prospect nationally in the class of 2026. He initially committed to play college football for the USC Trojans before later decommitting. He later committed to play for the Alabama Crimson Tide and signed with them in December 2025.
