= Jett Thomalla =

American football player (born 2007)

No. 15 – Alabama Crimson Tide
- Position: Quarterback
- Class: Freshman

Personal information
- Born: November 2, 2007 (age 19)
- Listed height: 6 ft 4 in (1.93 m)
- Listed weight: 220 lb (100 kg)

Career information
- High school: Millard South (Omaha, Nebraska)
- College: Alabama (2026–present)

Jett Thomalla (born November 2, 2007) is an American college football quarterback for the Alabama Crimson Tide.

== Early life ==
Thomalla is from Lexington, Nebraska. He attended Millard South High School where he played football as a quarterback and basketball as a point guard. He became starting quarterback in 2023 and threw for 2,800 yards and 26 touchdowns. As a junior, he helped the team win the state championship while compiling a record of 12–1, earning first-team all-state honors and being named the MaxPreps Nebraska Player of the Year after throwing for 3,664 yards and 47 touchdowns with only three interceptions. He broke the state records for single-season completions, passing yards, touchdowns and offensive yards. He was invited to the Elite 11 competition prior to his senior season. As a senior, he threw for 3,484 yards and 61 touchdowns, setting state records for passing yards, completions, and touchdowns, while helping Millard to another state championship.

A four-star recruit, Thomalla was ranked a top-70 player nationally, the number one player in Nebraska and a top-10 quarterback recruit. He initially committed to play college football for the Iowa State Cyclones. Thomalla later flipped his commitment to the Alabama Crimson Tide. He signed with the Crimson Tide in December 2025.
