= Devan Thompkins =

American football player

No. 1 – Alabama Crimson Tide
- Position: Defensive tackle
- Class: Redshirt Senior

Personal information
- Listed height: 6 ft 5 in (1.96 m)
- Listed weight: 298 lb (135 kg)

Career information
- High school: Edison (Stockton, California)
- College: USC (2022–2025); Alabama (2026–present)
- Stats at ESPN

Devan Thompkins is an American college football defensive tackle for the Alabama Crimson Tide. He previously played for the USC Trojans.

== Early life ==
Thompkins attended St. Mary's High School in Stockton, California for three years before transferring to Edison High School in Stockton for his senior year. He played basketball at St. Mary's and did not play football until his senior year at Edison. He played defensive end and tight end in high school and had nine tackles and caught three passes for 24 yards. Thompkins committed to the University of Southern California (USC) to play college football.

== College career ==
Thompkins played in three combined games his first two years at USC in 2022 and 2023. In 2024, he started six of 13 games and recorded 24 tackles and 1.5 sacks. In 2025, he had 31 tackles and three sacks. After the season, Thompkins entered the transfer portal.

== Personal life ==
Thompkins's uncle is former NFL linebacker, Larry Grant.
