= Daniel Hill (running back) =

American football player (born 2005)

No. 4 – Alabama Crimson Tide
- Position: Running back
- Class: Sophomore

Personal information
- Born: November 21, 2005 (age 20)
- Listed height: 6 ft 1 in (1.85 m)
- Listed weight: 244 lb (111 kg)

Career information
- High school: Meridian (Meridian, Mississippi)
- College: Alabama (2024–present)
- Stats at ESPN

Daniel Hill (born November 21, 2005) is an American college football running back for the Alabama Crimson Tide.

== Early life ==
Hill attended Meridian High School in Meridian, Mississippi. He missed time during his freshman and sophomore years after suffering two different broken legs. He returned from the injuries to have 1,013 rushing yards, 393 receiving yards, with 19 total touchdowns his junior year and 2,064 yards with 23 touchdowns his senior year. Hill was selected to play in the 2024 All-American Bowl. He committed to the University of Alabama to play college football.

== College career ==
As a true freshman at Alabama in 2024, Hill played in nine games and had 21 carries for 61 yards and a touchdown. As a sophomore in 2025, he earned more playing time.
