= Jah-Marien Latham =

American football player

No. 20 – Alabama Crimson Tide
- Position: Defensive lineman
- Class: Graduate Student

Personal information
- Listed height: 6 ft 3 in (1.91 m)
- Listed weight: 265 lb (120 kg)

Career information
- High school: Pickens County (Reform, Alabama)
- College: Alabama (2020–present)
- Stats at ESPN

Jah-Marien Latham (born c. 2002) is an American college football defensive lineman for the Alabama Crimson Tide.

== Early life ==
Latham attended Pickens County High School in Reform, Alabama. He committed to play college football for the Alabama Crimson Tide over other offers from South Carolina and Tennessee.

== College career ==
As a freshman in 2020, Latham helped the Crimson Tide to a national championship win. In 2021, he was redshirted. During the 2022 season, Latham recorded four tackles in 12 games played. In 2023, he appeared in all 14 games, notching eight tackles, a sack and a half, and a pass deflection. Heading into the 2024 season, he dropped ten pounds. Latham started in 11 games on the season, recording 29 tackles and a sack.
