= Jorden Edmonds =

American football player

No. 16 – Alabama Crimson Tide
- Position: Cornerback
- Class: Freshman

Personal information
- Listed height: 6 ft 3 in (1.91 m)
- Listed weight: 188 lb (85 kg)

Career information
- High school: Sprayberry (Marietta, Georgia)
- College: Alabama (2026–present)

Jorden Edmonds is an American college football cornerback for the Alabama Crimson Tide.

== Early life ==
Edmonds is from Marietta, Georgia, and is the son of former NFL player Chris Edmonds. He attended Sprayberry High School where he played football as a cornerback and wide receiver. As a sophomore, he posted 28 tackles, five pass breakups and two interceptions. He then recorded 35 tackles on defense and 35 catches for 670 yards with four touchdowns on offense as a junior in 2024, earning selection to the Atlanta Journal-Constitution all-state first-team as well as to the all-region team. Prior to his senior year, he was selected to the newspaper's Super 11 team, becoming the first player from Sprayberry ever to receive the honor. Edmonds was the team's leading receiver and also had 39 tackles, four pass breakups and two interceptions in his senior year. He received an invite to the All-American Bowl.

A five-star recruit, Edmonds was ranked the number one cornerback and a top-25 player nationally in the class of 2026. He committed to play college football for the Alabama Crimson Tide and signed with them in December 2025.
