= Ezavier Crowell =

American football player

No. 13 – Alabama Crimson Tide
- Position: Running back
- Class: Freshman

Personal information
- Listed height: 5 ft 11 in (1.80 m)
- Listed weight: 205 lb (93 kg)

Career information
- High school: Jackson (Jackson, Alabama)
- College: Alabama (2026–present)

Ezavier Crowell is an American college football running back for the Alabama Crimson Tide.

== Early life ==
Crowell attends Jackson High School in Jackson, Alabama. As a freshman in 2023, he rushed for 1,737 yards with 25 touchdowns and as a sophomore in 2024 rushed for 1,964 yards with 31 touchdowns. Crowell was selected to play in the 2026 Navy All-American Bowl.

A five-star recruit, Crowell is ranked as one of the best running backs in the 2026 class after reclassifying from the 2027 class. He was the highest rated running back from Alabama since T. J. Yeldon in 2012. He is committed to play college football at the University of Alabama.
