= Yhonzae Pierre =

American football player (born 2004)

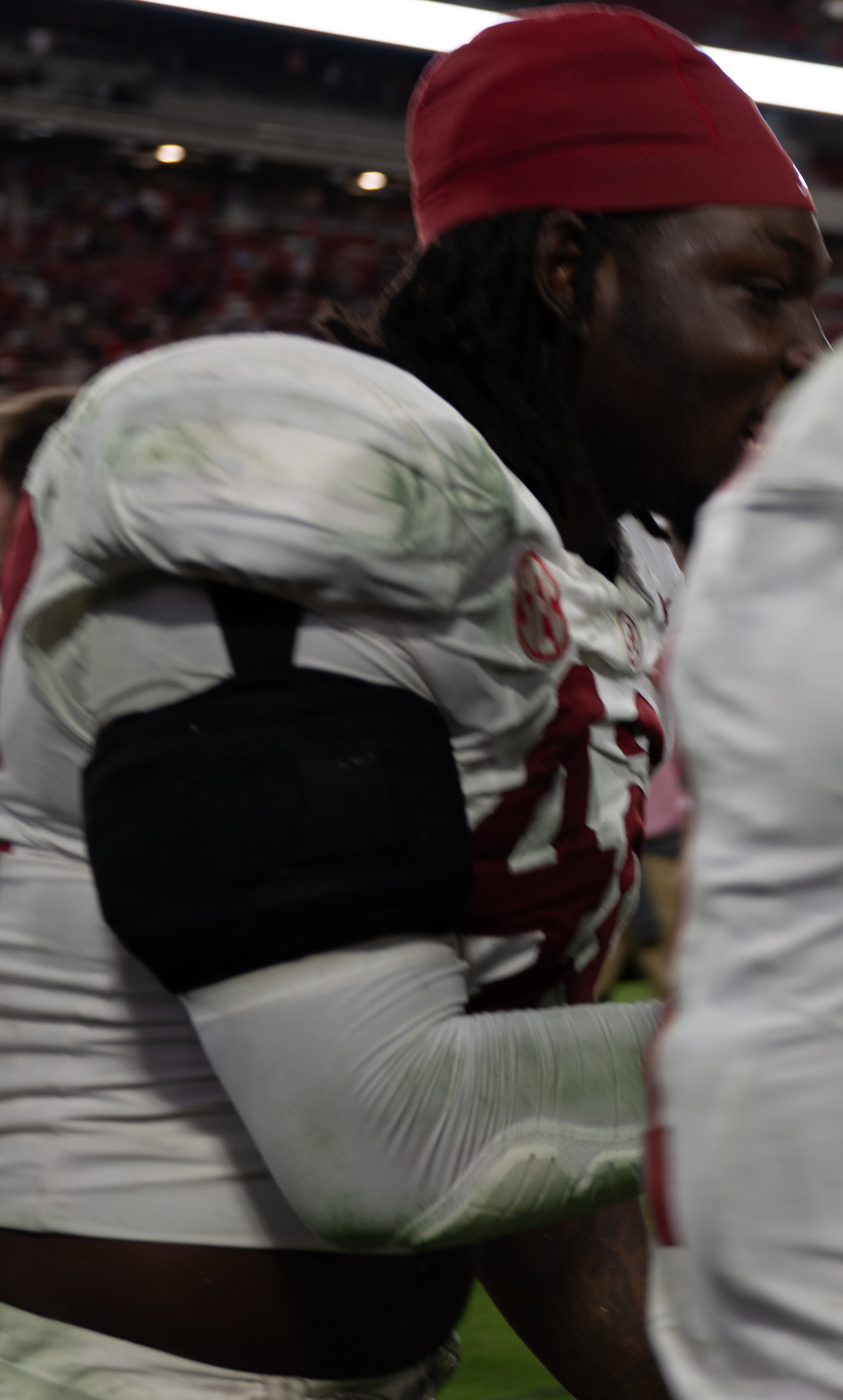
- Pierre in 2025

No. 0 – Alabama Crimson Tide
- Position: Linebacker
- Class: Redshirt Senior

Personal information
- Born: October 13, 2004 (age 22)
- Listed height: 6 ft 3 in (1.91 m)
- Listed weight: 253 lb (115 kg)

Career information
- High school: Eufaula (Eufaula, Alabama)
- College: Alabama (2023–present)
- Stats at ESPN

Yhonzae Pierre (born October 13, 2004) is an American college football linebacker for the Alabama Crimson Tide.

== Early life ==
Pierre attended Eufaula High School in Eufaula, Alabama. He was selected to the 2023 All-American Bowl. A five-star recruit, he committed to the University of Alabama to play college football.

== College career ==
After redshirting his first year at Alabama in 2023, Pierre played in 11 games his freshman year in 2024 and had six tackles. As a redshirt sophomore in 2025, he became a starter after numerous injuries and recorded three sacks against the 2025 Tennessee Volunteers. He finished with eight sacks total.
