= Kamario Taylor =

American football player (born 2007)

- Taylor in 2026

No. 1 – Mississippi State Bulldogs
- Position: Quarterback
- Class: Sophomore

Personal information
- Born: February 2, 2007 (age 19); Macon, Mississippi, U.S.
- Listed height: 6 ft 4 in (1.93 m)
- Listed weight: 230 lb (104 kg)

Career information
- High school: Noxubee County (Macon, Mississippi)
- College: Mississippi State (2025–present)
- Stats at ESPN

Kamario Antonio LaQuan Taylor (born February 2, 2007) is an American college football quarterback for the Mississippi State Bulldogs.

== Early life ==
Taylor was born on February 2, 2007 in Macon, Mississippi. He grew up in Macon and first began playing organized football for his local youth team, the Macon Broncos. He later attended Noxubee County High School in Macon, where he was a standout multi-sport athlete, playing football, baseball, basketball, and competing in high jump. As a senior in football, he passed for 2,400 yards with 30 touchdowns and rushed for 1,100 yards with 15 touchdowns. For his career, he passed for over 7,000 yards with 100 touchdowns and 2,000 rushing yards. Taylor committed to Mississippi State University to play college football.

== College career ==
Taylor entered his freshman year with Mississippi State as a backup to starter Blake Shapen. He earned playing time throughout the season in short-yardage situations. He scored his first touchdown on a 42-yard pass against Alcorn State. Taylor made his first career start against Ole Miss in the Egg Bowl, completing 15 passes for 178 yards and rushing for 173 yards and two touchdowns in a loss. He finished his freshman season throwing for 629 yards and five touchdowns while also rushing for 458 yards and eight scores.

Taylor began the 2026 season as the Bulldogs' starting quarterback. In Mississippi State's season opener against Louisiana–Monroe, Taylor threw for 354 yards and four touchdowns and rushed for 59 yards and a touchdown. The following week on the road against Minnesota, he threw for 227 passing yards with three touchdowns in the win. In the Bulldogs' SEC opener on the road against South Carolina, Taylor passed for four touchdowns on 251 yards as Mississippi State won 41–34. In their fourth game of the season against No. 19 Missouri, he threw the game winning touchdown pass to Sanfrisco Magee to lift the Bulldogs to a 31–24 victory.

=== Statistics ===
| Season | Team | Games | | | Passing | | | | | | | | Rushing | | | |
| Season | Team | GP | GS | Record | Cmp | Att | Pct | Yds | Y/A | TD | Int | Rtg | Att | Yds | Avg | TD |
|---|---|---|---|---|---|---|---|---|---|---|---|---|---|---|---|---|
| 2025 | Mississippi State | 11 | 2 | 0–2 | 43 | 77 | 55.8 | 629 | 8.2 | 5 | 1 | 143.3 | 82 | 458 | 5.6 | 8 |
| 2026 | Mississippi State | 6 | 6 | 4–2 | 104 | 159 | 65.4 | 1,460 | 9.2 | 17 | 4 | 173.0 | 46 | 147 | 3.2 | 1 |
| Career | | 17 | 8 | 4–4 | 147 | 236 | 62.3 | 2,089 | 8.9 | 22 | 5 | 163.2 | 128 | 605 | 4.7 | 9 |
