= Trae'shawn Brown =

American football player

No. 17 – Alabama Crimson Tide
- Position: Running back
- Class: Freshman

Personal information
- Listed height: 5 ft 10 in (1.78 m)
- Listed weight: 206 lb (93 kg)

Career information
- High school: Huntsville (Huntsville, Texas)
- College: Alabama (2026–present)
- Stats at ESPN

Trae'shawn Brown is an American college football running back for the Alabama Crimson Tide.

== Early life ==
Brown grew up in Huntsville, Texas, and attended Huntsville High School where he competed in football and track and field. A running back in football, he ran for 846 yards and 11 touchdowns as a sophomore and 752 yards and seven touchdowns as a junior. He then finished with 1,362 rushing yards and 17 touchdowns in his senior year. Brown was honored as a second-team all-district selection as a sophomore and then was a first-team choice as a junior and senior. He ran for 2,960 yards and 35 touchdowns in his high school career.

Brown was initially unranked as a college recruit. He received offers from several mid-level FBS programs and initially committed to play college football for the Boise State Broncos. Towards the end of 2025, he received an offer from the Alabama Crimson Tide and shortly after signed with them. In final rankings, Brown was a three-star recruit.

== College career ==
Brown impressed early on at Alabama. In the third game of the season, he led the team with 86 rushing yards and a touchdown.
