= Caleb Woodson =

American football player (born 2004)

No. 7 – Alabama Crimson Tide
- Position: Linebacker
- Class: Senior

Personal information
- Born: June 21, 2004 (age 22); Tampa, Florida, U.S.
- Listed height: 6 ft 3 in (1.91 m)
- Listed weight: 238 lb (108 kg)

Career information
- High school: Battlefield (Haymarket, Virginia)
- College: Virginia Tech (2023–2025); Alabama (2026–present)
- Stats at ESPN

Caleb Michael Woodson (born June 21, 2004) is an American college football linebacker for the Alabama Crimson Tide. He previously played for the Virginia Tech Hokies.

== Early life ==
Woodson attended Battlefield High School in Haymarket, Virginia, where he played linebacker and safety. As a senior, he had 115 tackles, five sacks, two fumble recovery touchdowns and an interception returned for a touchdown. He committed to Virginia Tech to play college football.

== College career ==
Woodson played at Virginia Tech from 2023 to 2025. Over 35 games, he had 151 tackles, two sacks and one interception. After the 2025 season, he entered the transfer portal and transferred to the University of Alabama.
