= Lotzeir Brooks =

American football player

No. 3 – Alabama Crimson Tide
- Position: Wide receiver
- Class: Sophomore

Personal information
- Listed height: 5 ft 9 in (1.75 m)
- Listed weight: 193 lb (88 kg)

Career information
- High school: Millville (Millville, New Jersey)
- College: Alabama (2025–present)
- Stats at ESPN

Lotzeir Brooks is an American football wide receiver for the Alabama Crimson Tide.

== Early life ==
Brooks played prep football at Millville High School located in Cumberland County, New Jersey, where he set state career records with 4,233 receiving yards and 63 touchdown catches. Coming out of high school, he was rated as a four-star recruit, where he held offers from schools such as Alabama, Arkansas, and Penn State. Ultimately, Brooks committed to play college football for the Alabama Crimson Tide.

== College career ==
Brooks entered his true freshman 2025 season in line to be a contributor for the Crimson Tide. In week two of the 2025 season, he got his first career start where he notched four catches for 58 yards in a win versus Louisiana–Monroe. In week five, Brooks tallied two catches for 40 yards in an upset win over Georgia Bulldogs. In week seven, Brooks hauled in four passes for 58 yards, including a huge conversion on fourth down, in a victory over Missouri. In the first round of the College Football Playoffs, Brooks caught 5 passes for 79 yards and 2 touchdowns in a 17-point comeback victory over the Oklahoma Sooners.
