= Keon Sabb =

American football player (born 2002)

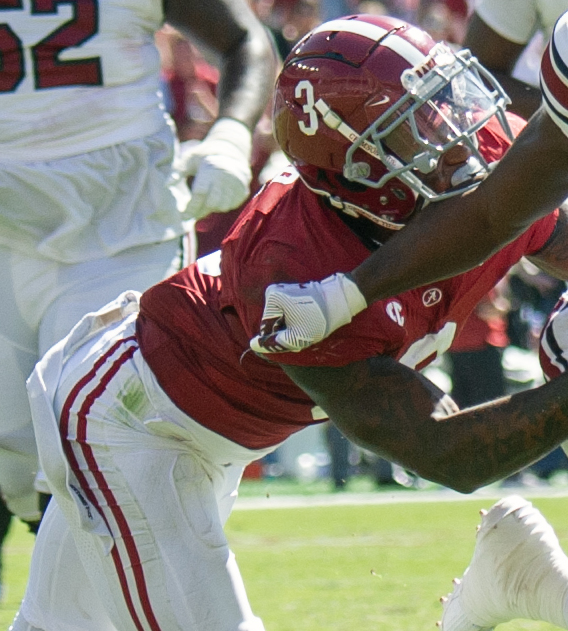
- Sabb in 2024

No. 3 – Alabama Crimson Tide
- Position: Safety
- Class: (redshirt) Senior

Personal information
- Born: September 18, 2002 (age 24); Glassboro, New Jersey, U.S.
- Listed height: 6 ft 1 in (1.85 m)
- Listed weight: 208 lb (94 kg)

Career information
- High school: IMG Academy
- College: Michigan (2022–2023); Alabama (2024–present)

Awards and highlights
- CFP national champion (2023)
- Stats at ESPN

Keon Sabb (born September 18, 2002) is an American college football safety for the Alabama Crimson Tide. He previously played for the Michigan Wolverines, winning a national championship in 2023.

== Early life ==
Sabb was born and raised in Glassboro, New Jersey. He initially attended Glassboro High School before transferring to nearby Williamstown High School for his junior year then finishing at IMG Academy for his senior season. As a freshman, Sabb totaled 46 tackles, seven pass deflections, and six interceptions. In his sophomore season, he recorded 31 tackles and five interceptions on defense and made 29 receptions for 376 yards and six touchdowns, and threw a touchdown pass, on offense. As a junior, Sabb made 19 catches for 358 yards and three touchdowns, while also notching 19 tackles on defense.

=== Recruiting ===
Coming out of high school, Sabb was rated as a four-star recruit and held offers from schools such as Georgia, Clemson, Texas A&M, Penn State, Alabama, LSU, Ohio State, Ole Miss, Oklahoma, Oregon, and Michigan. He initially committed to play college football for the Clemson Tigers. However on December 6, 2021, he flipped his commitment to play for the Michigan Wolverines.

== College career ==
=== Michigan ===
In 2022, Sabb enrolled at the University of Michigan, and in his first season he appeared in four games, but did not record any statistics. As a sophomore in 2023, he started five games for the Wolverines, including a start in the National Championship Game. In total, Sabb recorded 28 tackles, a shared sack and two interceptions, returning one for a touchdown.

After starting in five of 29 games in his first two seasons behind Rod Moore and Makari Paige, Sabb entered the NCAA transfer portal after both Moore and Paige returned to Michigan for their senior seasons in 2024.

=== Alabama ===
On February 19, 2024, Sabb transferred to Alabama, becoming one of the first recruits to join the football program following retirement of Nick Saban and hiring of Kalen DeBoer. He played both Saban and DeBoer in the 2023–24 College Football Playoff, the Crimson Tide in the 2024 Rose Bowl, and DeBoer as head coach at Washington in the national championship.
