= 2024 Alabama vs. Vanderbilt football game =

Alabama vs. Vanderbilt, 2024
- Vanderbilt's first victory against Alabama in 40 years
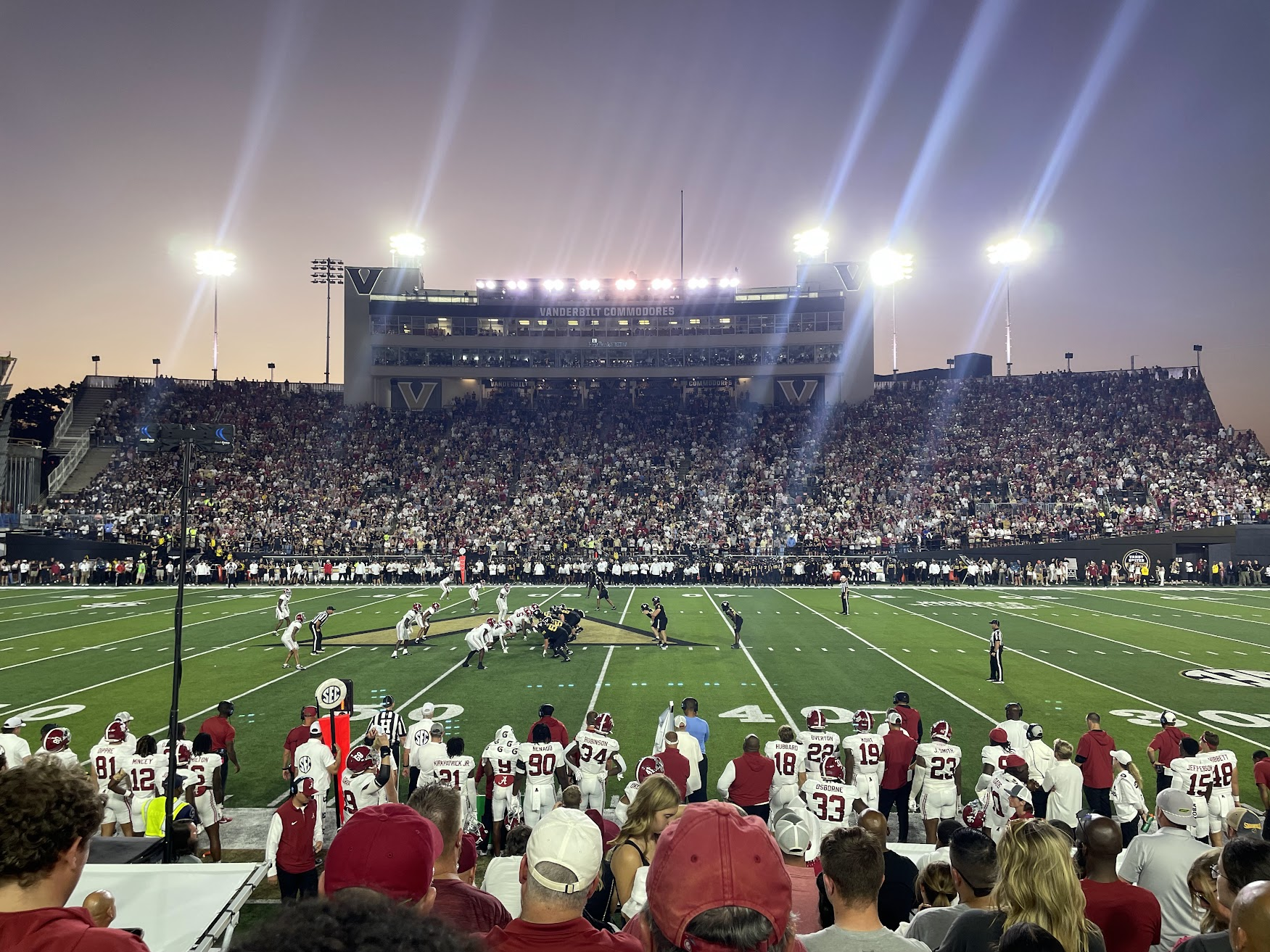
- FirstBank Stadium on October 5, 2024.
Alabama Crimson Tide	Vanderbilt Commodores
(4–0)	(2–2)
SEC	SEC
35	40
Head coach: Kalen DeBoer	Head coach: Clark Lea
AP / Coaches; 1 / 2
	1	2	3	4	Total
Alabama	7	7	14	7	35
Vanderbilt	13	10	7	10	40
- Date: October 5, 2024
- Season: 2024
- Stadium: FirstBank Stadium
- Location: Nashville, Tennessee
- Favorite: Alabama by 23.5
- Referee: Lee Hendrick
- Attendance: 28,934

United States TV coverage
- Network: SEC Network
- Announcers: Tom Hart, Cole Cubelic, and Alyssa Lang

The 2024 Alabama vs. Vanderbilt football game was a regular season college football game between the Vanderbilt Commodores and Alabama Crimson Tide played at FirstBank Stadium in Nashville, Tennessee, on October 5, 2024. Entering the game, Alabama had a 4–0 record and was ranked No. 1 in the AP Top 25 poll following a win against No. 2 Georgia; the Crimson Tide held a 63–18–4 lead in their series against Vanderbilt. As Vanderbilt's first win over Alabama in 40 years (breaking a streak of 23 losses) and first win over a No. 1 team in program history, the game was immediately hailed by media outlets and fans as one of the sport's biggest upsets in recent history, even drawing comparisons to prior upsets such as the 2007 Appalachian State vs. Michigan game. The win was also Vanderbilt's first against any team ranked by the AP in the top five, breaking a 60-game losing streak, the longest of any team since the beginning of the AP Poll in 1936. It was the first time since 1996 that Alabama allowed more than 20 points to Vanderbilt in a single game and the most points they had allowed to Vanderbilt since 1906. Due to these and other factors, several news outlets and publications declared the game "historic", and called it the biggest and most significant in the history of Vanderbilt's football program, as well as one of the biggest, if not the biggest, upsets in Southeastern Conference (SEC) and in overall college football history.

== Background ==
=== Alabama ===
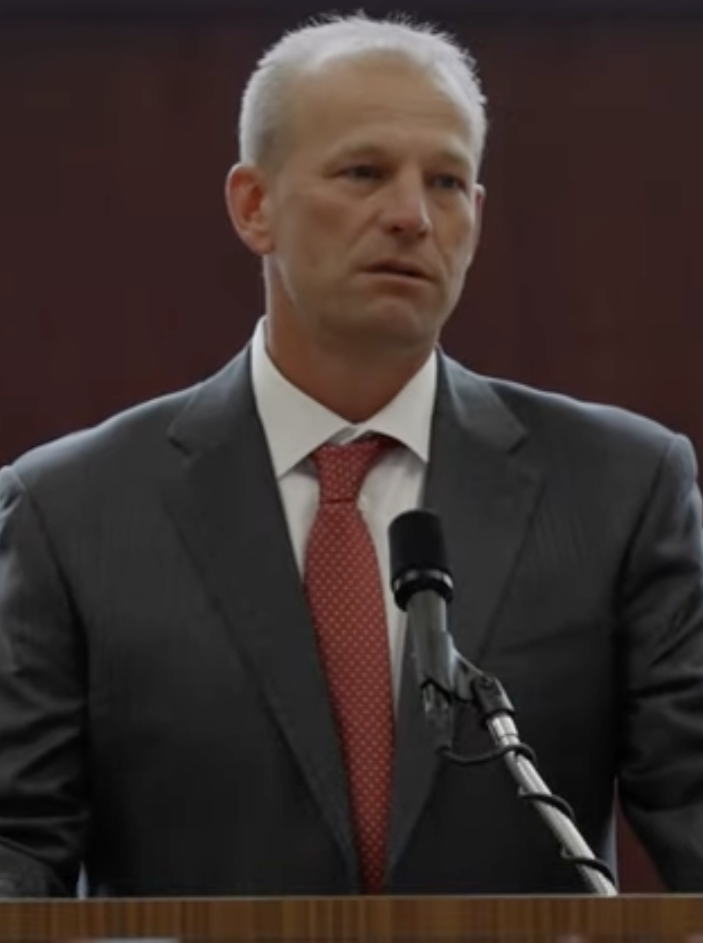
Alabama coach Kalen DeBoer

The 2024 Alabama Crimson Tide began the season as their first with newly-appointed head coach Kalen DeBoer, following the retirement of long-time coach Nick Saban in the offseason, after winning six national championships. They had managed to earn a 4–0 record, defeating the AP poll No. 2 ranked Georgia Bulldogs 41–34, representing DeBoer's first Southeastern Conference (SEC) win and earning the team a No. 1 ranked position for the following weekly poll. In addition, the team was projected by CBS Sports to win the SEC championship and to reach a No. 2 playoff seed.

The last game they played against Vanderbilt on September 24, 2022 saw quarterback Bryce Young throw for four touchdowns and 385 yards, defeating the Commodores with a 55–3 score.

Former Alabama coach Nick Saban appeared on The Pat McAfee Show leading up to the competition, where he stated that Vanderbilt was the only exception in Alabama's schedule of tough SEC opponents. He also stated that when playing an away game at Vanderbilt's stadium that Alabama had more fans there than they had.

=== Vanderbilt ===
The 2024 Vanderbilt Commodores entered the game with a 2–2 record following a close road loss to Missouri off of a missed potential game-winning field goal, forcing overtime and failing to respond to Missouri's field goal to lose 30–27. Vanderbilt had only two wins against SEC teams since the end of the 2019 season.

Prior to the game, Alabama had won 23 consecutive games against Vanderbilt, a streak beginning in 1984. In addition, Vanderbilt had a 0–60 game history against AP-ranked top-5 opponents, representing the longest streak since the beginning of the AP poll era in 1936.

== Pre-game ==
Alabama entered the game with markedly favorable odds to win by 23.5 points. Prior to the start of the game, the entire eastern sideline of the FirstBank Stadium in Nashville, Tennessee was filled with Alabama fans, aside from the Vanderbilt student section. A Sports Illustrated reporter noted that for every Vanderbilt fan walking outside the stadium prior to the game, it appeared that there were about ten more Alabama fans. Alabama wide receiver Kendrick Law was ruled out, while linebacker Justin Jefferson's participation was ruled to be a decision made once the game started.

== Game summary ==
=== First quarter ===
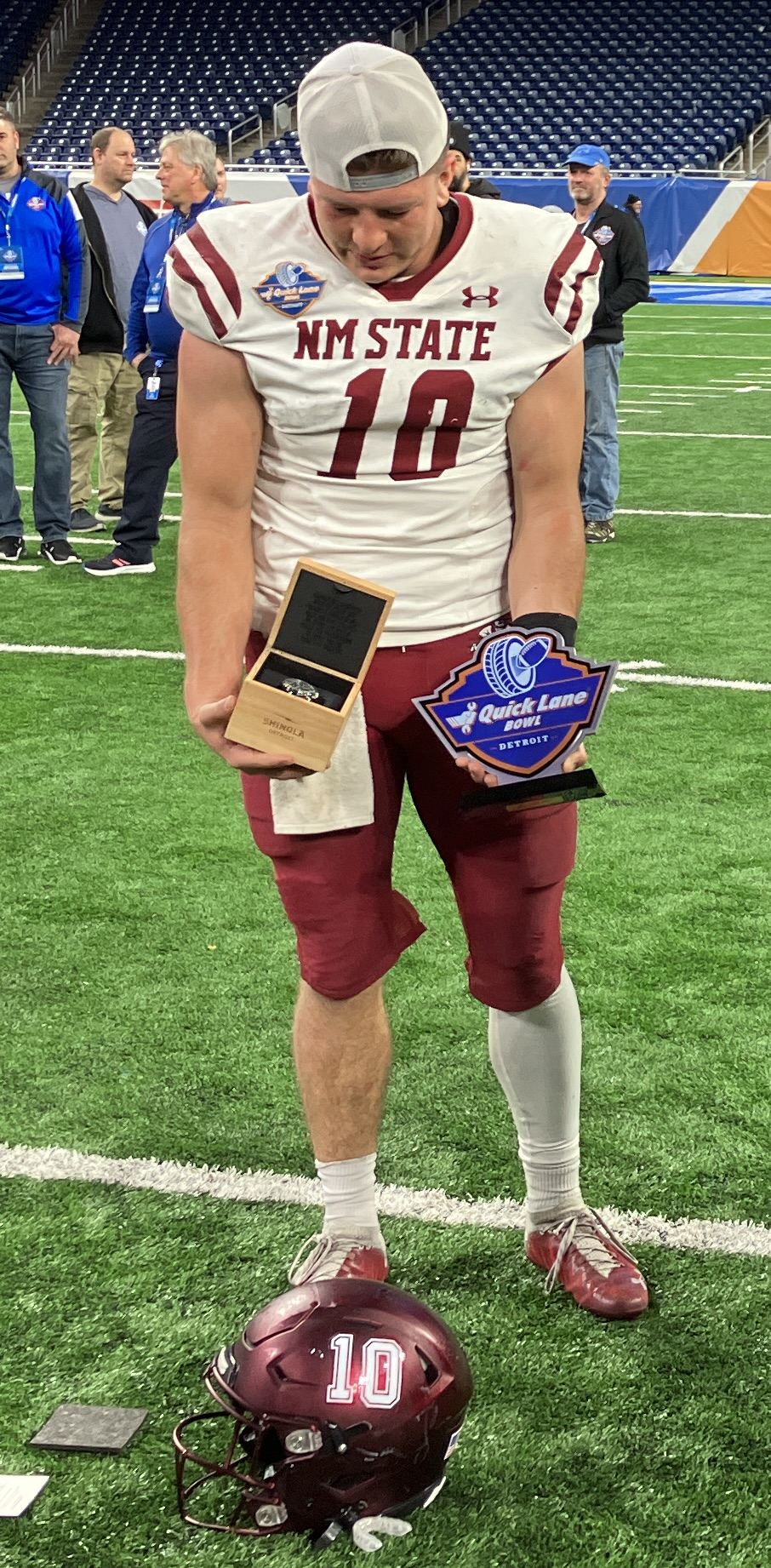
Vanderbilt quarterback Diego Pavia (then with New Mexico State) in 2022

The game commenced with Alabama's Conor Talty executing a touchback, giving Vanderbilt possession at their 25-yard line. The Commodores' opening drive began with a short rushing gain by Sedrick Alexander, which was then followed with an outside run by A. J. Newberry resulting in a first down. Facing third-and-5 at the 40, quarterback Diego Pavia successfully converted a screen pass to Newberry. A quick pass to Quincy Skinner Jr. advanced the ball to Alabama's 33-yard line. After this, Pavia, under pressure, found Eli Stowers for another crucial first down at the 16-yard line. The drive culminated in a 7-yard touchdown run by Alexander, and Vanderbilt led 7–0 with 8:46 remaining in the quarter.

Alabama's first drive began at the 25-yard line following a touchback. After a 4-yard rush by Justice Haynes, the team suffered a harsh setback on third down when quarterback Jalen Milroe's pass intended for the 17-year-old freshman wide receiver Ryan Coleman-Williams was deflected and intercepted by Randon Fontenette. Fontenette then returned it 24 yards for a touchdown to extend Vanderbilt's lead to 13–0, as kicker Brock Taylor's extra point attempt bounced off the left upright. Alabama's second possession involved Milroe connecting with CJ Dippre for a 46-yard gain, followed by a first-down completion to Josh Cuevas, who was briefly attended to by trainers after a hard hit. The drive concluded with Jam Miller scoring on an 8-yard run, with kicker Graham Nicholson's successful PAT narrowing the gap to 13–7 with 4:22 left in the quarter.

As the quarter neared its end, Vanderbilt converted a 3rd-and-6 from their own 29-yard line before Alabama's defense managed a third-down stop, forcing a Vanderbilt punt in the final minute. The quarter concluded with a peculiar incident: Alabama was penalized for having two players wearing number 2 on the field during a punt return, resulting in Vanderbilt gaining possession at the Alabama 47-yard line. At the first quarter's end, Vanderbilt held a surprising 13–7 lead over Alabama, having dominated the first two drives of the game in part by capitalizing on Alabama's mistakes.

=== Second quarter ===
The quarter began with Vanderbilt facing a 3rd-and-8 situation, where Pavia scrambled for a first down, with an additional 15 yards added due to a face mask penalty against Alabama's Jihaad Campbell, moving the ball to Alabama's 22-yard line. After a roughing the passer penalty on Alabama's Que Robinson that gave Vanderbilt another fresh set of downs, Pavia converted another third down on a keeper, setting up 1st-and-goal at the 1-yard line. Following an Alabama timeout to avoid a 12-men penalty, Alexander scored his 2nd touchdown of the game from one-yard out. The 17-play, 75-yard drive consumed 9:50 of game time, increasing Vanderbilt's lead to 20–7 with 9:32 remaining in the half.

Alabama's subsequent possession was marred by several difficulties, with Emmanuel Henderson fumbling the kickoff return, albeit being ruled down by contact upon review. Starting from their own 14, Alabama's drive stalled quickly, with a sack on second down leading to a third-and-long situation. An initially ruled first-down catch bobbled by Coleman-Williams on third-and-11 was overturned upon review, forcing Alabama to punt. Vanderbilt capitalized on their good field position at their own 42, moving into Alabama territory before being stopped on third down. Taylor successfully kicked a 51-yard field goal, which extended Vanderbilt's lead to 23–7 with 4:10 left in the half.

After a short kickoff return, Alabama started at their 16-yard line. Successful plays for Alabama's drive included a 14-yard run by Justice Haynes and a crucial third-down conversion by Kobe Prentice, including a targeting call against Vanderbilt that was overturned upon review. A few plays later, Miller broke free for a long run to the Vanderbilt 3-yard line. Following this, Miller scored his second touchdown of the day on a 3-yard run, which narrowed Vanderbilt's lead to 23–14 with 1:25 remaining in the half.

After Vanderbilt received the ball and converted another third down to reach Alabama territory, their momentum was stalled by a delay of game penalty, leading to a third-and-15 situation. After initially lining up for a 60-yard field goal attempt, Vanderbilt opted to punt following a timeout. Going into halftime, Vanderbilt maintained an unexpected 23–14 lead with a significantly longer time of possession of 21 minutes and 28 seconds out of the total 30 minutes of play and converting 7 out of 10 third-down attempts, coupled with Alabama's defensive lapses and penalties. For the first time in the 2024 season, Alabama quarterback Milroe failed to score in a half of play.

=== Third quarter ===
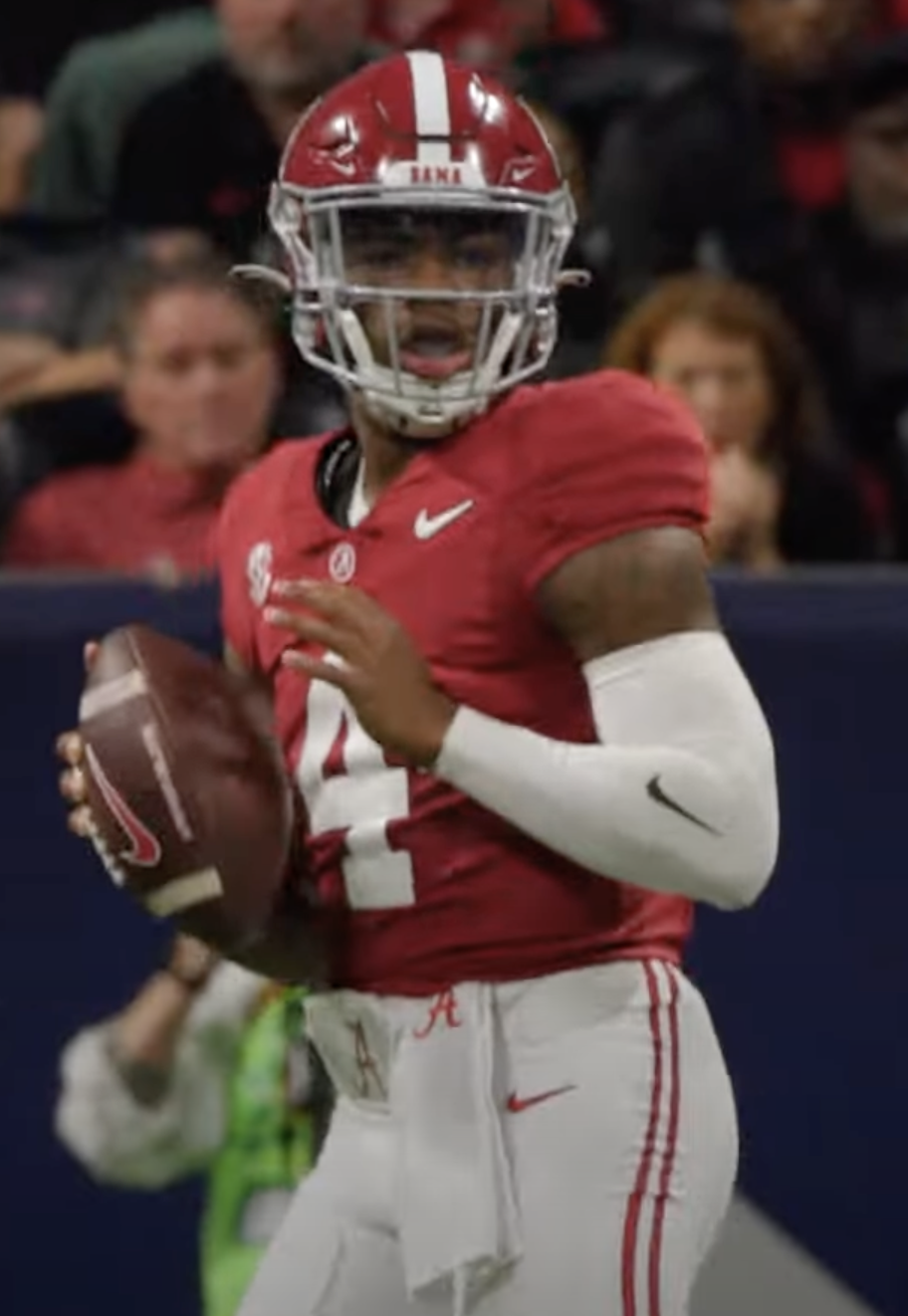
Alabama quarterback Jalen Milroe in 2023

Alabama started the second half with greater offensive efficiency, beginning when Emmanuel Henderson returned the kickoff to the 46-yard line, giving Alabama good field position. Milroe connected with Germie Bernard and Robbie Ouzts for consecutive first downs, pushing into Vanderbilt territory. Coleman-Williams made his first two receptions of the game, a 13-yard catch to the Vanderbilt 25, and an 11-yarder into red zone territory. Milroe finished the drive with a 14-yard touchdown run, narrowing Vanderbilt's lead to 23–21 with 12:01 left in the quarter.

Vanderbilt's subsequent possession began from their 25, with Robinson sacking Pavia on first down. Despite this setback, the Commodores converted their eighth 3rd down of the game to continue the drive. Despite nearly converting another third-and-long, a dropped pass forced Vanderbilt to punt from midfield. The drive consumed 5:46 of game time, maintaining Vanderbilt's time of possession.

Alabama's next drive began with poor field position from their own 4-yard line. The Crimson Tide faced a third-and-9 from their own 5-yard line when Milroe's subsequent pass on third down was ruled an illegal forward pass as he had crossed the line of scrimmage, resulting in a loss of downs and a punt. Vanderbilt capitalized on the resulting good field position at the Alabama 45-yard line, with Pavia finding Junior Sherrill behind Alabama's defense for a 36-yard touchdown reception in a 4th-and-1 situation. The touchdown extended Vanderbilt's lead to 30–21, with 2:53 remaining in the quarter.

Alabama moved quickly down the field after from their 25 after a touchback, culminating in a 58-yard touchdown reception by Coleman-Williams, who broke two tackles along the sideline enroute to the end zone. This play brought Alabama within two points of Vanderbilt at 30–28, with 1:01 left in the quarter. As the quarter drew to a close, Vanderbilt began another drive at their 25, with Pavia executing a shovel pass play to Eli Stowers on a 33-yard catch-and-run while breaking multiple Alabama tackles on the final play of the quarter.

=== Fourth quarter ===
The final quarter of the game began with Vanderbilt at Alabama's 40-yard line with a first down. Their offense quickly converted a third-and-short situation, pushing into the red zone. Despite having a touchdown nullified by a holding penalty, Vanderbilt managed a 35-yard field goal from Brock Taylor, extending their lead to 33–28 with 10:35 remaining. On Alabama's subsequent drive, following completions to Dippre and Bernard, Milroe was strip-sacked by Miles Capers with Elijah Pritchett being beaten on the pass rush. Yilanan Ouattara recovered the fumble for Vanderbilt at their own 47-yard line with 9:36 left. The Commodores capitalized on the turnover while facing a third-and-2 at Alabama's 45, with Pavia found a diving Stowers for a first down. The drive culminated in a 6-yard touchdown pass from Pavia to Kamrean Johnson on third-and-2, pushing Vanderbilt's lead to 40–28 with 5:07 left.

Starting at their 25, Alabama quickly moved downfield, highlighted by an athletic catch by Bernard that survived a review. Facing fourth-and-1 at the Vanderbilt 2-yard line, Alabama called a timeout with 2:54 remaining. The Crimson Tide executed a pitch to Coleman-Williams, who found the end zone for a touchdown, narrowing the score to 40–35 with 2:46 left. Starting at their 18-yard line with 2:44 remaining, Vanderbilt successfully executed a screen pass to Alexander on second-and-12 that resulted in a crucial first down just before the two-minute timeout. Vanderbilt secured two additional first downs on a 13-yard run by Alexander and an 8-yard scramble by Pavia with just over a minute remaining, effectively sealing the game as Alabama had exhausted their timeouts. The final score stood at Vanderbilt 40, Alabama 35, marking Vanderbilt's first win over Alabama in 40 years.

==== Malachi Moore outbursts ====
As the final kneel downs were taking place, Alabama graduate senior, strong safety, and one of the team's leaders Malachi Moore forcibly grabbed Pavia's facemask and slammed his head into the ground following the whistle, screamed at his teammates, threw his mouthpiece prior to a play, and kicked the ball out of a referee's hand after it was spotted, leading to an unsportsmanlike conduct penalty. In the middle of Moore's outburst, Alabama's defensive coordinator Kane Wommack attempted to substitute Moore out of play, but he refused to exit.

=== Scoring summary ===
Scoring summary

Quarter	Time	Drive			Team	Scoring information	Score	
Quarter	Time	Plays	Yards	TOP	Team	Scoring information	Alabama	Vanderbilt
1	8:46	10	75	6:14	Vanderbilt	Sedrick Alexander 7-yard touchdown run, Brock Taylor kick good	0	7
1	8:03	-	-	-	Vanderbilt	Interception returned 29 yards for touchdown by Randon Fontenette, Brock Taylor kick no good, hit left upright	0	13
1	4:22	7	75	3:41	Alabama	Jam Miller 8-yard touchdown run, Graham Nicholson kick good	7	13
2	9:32	17	75	3:41	Vanderbilt	Sedrick Alexander 1-yard touchdown run, Brock Taylor kick good	7	20
2	4:10	8	26	4:02	Vanderbilt	51-yard field goal by Brock Taylor	7	23
2	1:25	9	83	2:41	Alabama	Jam Miller 3-yard touchdown run, Graham Nicholson kick good	14	23
3	12:01	5	53	2:51	Alabama	Jalen Milroe 14-yard touchdown run, Graham Nicholson kick good	21	23
3	2:53	4	45	2:13	Vanderbilt	Junior Sherrill 36-yard touchdown reception from Diego Pavia, Brock Taylor kick good	21	30
3	1:01	4	75	1:52	Alabama	Ryan Coleman-Williams 58-yard touchdown reception from Jalen Milroe, Graham Nicholson kick good	28	30
4	10:35	9	60	5:26	Vanderbilt	33-yard field goal by Brock Taylor	28	33
4	5:07	7	53	4:29	Vanderbilt	Kamrean Johnson 6-yard touchdown reception from Diego Pavia, Brock Taylor kick good	28	40
4	2:46	8	75	2:21	Alabama	Ryan Coleman-Williams 2-yard touchdown run, Graham Nicholson kick good	35	40
"TOP" = time of possession. For other American football terms, see Glossary of American football.							35	40

=== Statistical summary ===
	Alabama	Vanderbilt
1st downs	17	26
3rd down Efficiency	3–7	12–18
4th down Efficiency	1–1	1–1
Total yards	394	418
Passing yards	310	252
Completions/Attempts	18/24	16/21
Yards per pass	12.9	12.0
Rushing yards	84	166
Rushing Attempts	21	54
Penalties/Yards	6–57	3–20
Turnovers	2	0
Interceptions	1	0
Fumbles lost	1	0
Time of possession	17:52	42:08

== Aftermath ==
=== Vanderbilt ===
Many news outlets and publications immediately declared the game as the biggest in the history of Vanderbilt's football program at its conclusion. As soon as the game ended, Vanderbilt fans swarmed the field and began to tear down the stadium's goalposts in celebration as they jumped up and down and danced. The crowd of fans proceeded to carry the goalposts out of the stadium, walking two miles along Broadway Street to throw it into the Cumberland River, after which the crowd began a Seven Nation Army chant. The action was compared to the post-game celebration of in-state rival Tennessee Volunteers fans, who also tore a goalpost off its foundations and threw it into the Tennessee River (but carried it a much shorter distance) following a similar upset against Alabama. In addition, the stadium began to play clips on loop of Nick Saban's recent interview on The Pat McAfee Show calling Vanderbilt the exception to difficult teams in the SEC.

Vanderbilt coach Clark Lea stated after the game that the victory was the dream, and promised to enjoy it before preparing his team to make more wins against big opponents. Vanderbilt quarterback Diego Pavia, while being interviewed right after the upset victory, emotionally stated:

"It's literally all God's timing. Literally from the jump. God gave me a vision when I was a little kid… It's God's timeline. I'm super thankful for guys like Eli Stowers. Man, that kid's incredible. The rest of our team. Look at this. Look at this. Vandy, we're fucking turnt!"

— Diego Pavia

The win was regarded by several news outlets as a historic upset, represented by the victory being Vanderbilt's first win over an AP top-ranked football program in its history, as well as the first time it scored forty points versus an AP top-five opponent. Vanderbilt's quarterback Diego Pavia finished with an 80% completion rate, representing the highest rate by a quarterback competing against Alabama since 2010. Pavia succeeded Kansas State's Skylar Thompson and Syracuse's Eric Dungey and for winning games where they were 21+ point underdogs over the past twenty seasons, reaching three as a result of the game.

=== Alabama ===
Alabama became the fourth No. 1 team since the beginning of AP polls to lose to an unranked program the week following a win over a top-two ranked opponent, and the first to do so since the 1960 victory of the Purdue Boilermakers over the Minnesota Golden Gophers. The game also marked the first time since 1996 since Alabama gave up more than 20 points in a single game to Vanderbilt, with the 40 points they gave up being the most against Vanderbilt since a 78–0 blowout loss on October 20, 1906. Alabama giving up 13 points in the first quarter was considered notable due to Vanderbilt only being able to score a combined total of 13 points across the four games where they faced against the Nick Saban-led Alabama teams.

Alabama coach Kalen DeBoer, in the post-game press conference, stated that he was:

"Obviously, extremely disappointed, frustrated. You named what it is. That's what everyone is like in the locker room right now... We're gonna find out how much we care about each other, and what it looks like moving forward. We've been tested in different ways, really, a lot of the games here this season, and this is a different type of test for us now in our response."

— Kalen DeBoer

He praised the Vanderbilt offense's control of the game, their play action and ability to find open spaces for completions, and Vanderbilt coach Clark Lea's play calling. Linebacker Deontae Lawson stated that while it was still early in the season, he stated that the team never wanted to feel how they felt following the upset loss ever again. Alabama linebacker Quandarrius Robinson called safety Malachi Moore's outburst at the end of the game unacceptable, noting his role as a team captain and that he calmed down in the locker room after the game.

CBS Sports analysts noted that the upset loss severely weakened the likelihood of Alabama making a strong playoff berth, putting it at the mercy of the performances of Texas, Tennessee, Georgia, and Texas A&M.

In the subsequent AP poll, Alabama dropped from No. 1 to No. 7, with the Texas Longhorns taking back the No. 1 spot and Alabama falling behind Georgia in spite of previously defeating them head-to-head.

=== Media and celebrity reactions ===
ESPN referred to the upset victory as "A NEW MUSIC CITY MIRACLE! [sic]" on its Twitter/X page. Several sports figures reacted to the upset by giving high praise to Vanderbilt while also making fun of or celebrating the No. 1 ranked Alabama team's downfall, including former Indianapolis Colts punter and sports analyst Pat McAfee, J.D. Pickell, and former Notre Dame linebacker and Butkus Award winner Jeremiah Owusu-Koramoah (who played under Clark Lea while he was the Irish’s defensive coordinator). Several social media users decried Malachi Moore's outbursts during the final plays of the game, with many stating that such behavior would not go undisciplined under former coach Nick Saban.

Mayor of Nashville Freddie O’Connell made a joking Twitter/X post following the game: “I’m hearing reports that the Cumberland River is experiencing low tide” in reference to Alabama and the goalposts thrown into the river.

Former ESPN personality and Vanderbilt alum Skip Bayless uploaded a video on his social media pages exclaiming excitement and congratulating the team and program on the historic win.

=== Subsequent games ===
Vanderbilt's victory over Alabama marked the beginning of a winning streak. The following week, the Commodores defeated the Kentucky Wildcats 20–13 on the road, achieving another upset as double-digit underdogs and becoming 2–1 in the SEC. They then extended their winning streak to three by defeating the Ball State Cardinals 24–14. Following the win over Ball State, Vanderbilt was ranked No. 25 in the AP poll, marking Vanderbilt's first appearance in the top 25 since the 2013 season. However, the Commodores lost four of their last five regular season games, despite clinching bowl eligibility. Vanderbilt then defeated Georgia Tech in the Birmingham Bowl to finish at 7–6, the Commodores' first winning season (and Bowl win) since 2013.

Alabama's loss to Vanderbilt marked the beginning of a struggling season. The following week back home, the Crimson Tide almost fell to the South Carolina Gamecocks, trailing 19–14 in the third quarter before ultimately winning 27–25 on a game-winning interception. In the final minute of regulation, South Carolina scored a touchdown, failed the two-point conversion, and recovered an onside kick before losing. Alabama then lost on the road to the No. 11 Tennessee Volunteers 24–17, marking their second loss of the season. Alabama plummeted in the subsequent AP poll, dropping from No. 7 to No. 15, the program's lowest ranking since 2010. Following wins over Missouri, LSU, and Mercer that rose Alabama to No. 7 in the College Football Playoff rankings, the Crimson Tide lost to another unranked team, Oklahoma, by a score of 24–3. After a victory over in-state rival Auburn, Alabama finished the regular season at 9–3 but was still on the outside looking for a CFP berth. After some debate over whether Alabama or SMU (which lost to Clemson on a last-second field goal in the ACC Championship game) deserve the final at-large playoff berth, the committee ultimately chose SMU over Alabama, citing the Crimson Tide's losses to unranked Vanderbilt and Oklahoma as a factor. Alabama eventually lost to Michigan in the ReliaQuest Bowl to conclude the season at 9–4. The Crimson Tide failed to reach 10 wins in a season for the first time since 2007, Nick Saban's first year as head coach.

== See also ==
- 1921 Centre vs. Harvard football game
- 2007 Appalachian State vs. Michigan football game
- 2015 Florida State vs. Georgia Tech football game
- 2022 Third Saturday in October
- Music City Miracle
- List of nicknamed college football games and plays
