= 2024 Alabama Crimson Tide football team =

American college football season

2024 Alabama Crimson Tide football

ReliaQuest Bowl, L 13–19 vs. Michigan
- Conference: Southeastern Conference

Ranking
- Coaches: No. 17
- AP: No. 17
- Record: 9–4 (5–3 SEC)
- Head coach: Kalen DeBoer (1st season)
- Offensive coordinator: Nick Sheridan (1st season)
- Co-offensive coordinator: JaMarcus Shephard (1st season)
- Offensive scheme: Spread
- Defensive coordinator: Kane Wommack (1st season)
- Co-defensive coordinators: Maurice Linguist (1st season); Colin Hitschler (1st season)
- Base defense: 4–2–5, Swarm
- Captains: Tyler Booker; Deontae Lawson; Jalen Milroe; Malachi Moore
- Home stadium: Bryant–Denny Stadium

2024 Southeastern Conference football standings
	Conf.			Overall
Team	W		L	W		L
No. 4 Texas y^	7	–	1	13	–	3
No. 6 Georgia y$^	6	–	2	11	–	3
No. 9 Tennessee ^	6	–	2	10	–	3
No. 22 Missouri	5	–	3	10	–	3
No. 11 Ole Miss	5	–	3	10	–	3
No. 17 Alabama	5	–	3	9	–	4
No. 19 South Carolina	5	–	3	9	–	4
LSU	5	–	3	9	–	4
Texas A&M	5	–	3	8	–	5
Florida	4	–	4	8	–	5
Arkansas	3	–	5	7	–	6
Vanderbilt	3	–	5	7	–	6
Oklahoma	2	–	6	6	–	7
Auburn	2	–	6	5	–	7
Kentucky	1	–	7	4	–	8
Mississippi State	0	–	8	2	–	10
Championship: Georgia 22, Texas 19 ^{OT}
^ – College Football Playoff participant; $ – Conference champion; y – Championship game participant; Rankings from AP Poll

The 2024 Alabama Crimson Tide football team represented the University of Alabama during the 2024 NCAA Division I FBS football season. The season was the Crimson Tide's 130th overall season, and 91st as a member of the Southeastern Conference (SEC). The Crimson Tide played their home games at Bryant–Denny Stadium located in Tuscaloosa, Alabama, in the first year under new head coach Kalen DeBoer.

Nick Saban, who had coached the team since 2007, winning six national championships, retired in the offseason.

== Offseason ==
Positions key
Offense	Defense	Special teams
QB — Quarterback; RB — Running back; FB — Fullback; WR — Wide receiver; TE — Tight end; OL — Offensive lineman; T — Tackle; G — Guard; C — Center	DL — Defensive lineman; DT — Defensive tackle (Note: Includes nose tackle (NT)); DE — Defensive end; EDGE — Edge rusher; LB — Linebacker (Note: Includes middle linebacker (MLB/MIKE), weakside linebacker (WILL), strongside linebacker (SAM), off-ball linebacker, and outside linebacker (OLB)); DB — Defensive back; CB — Cornerback; S — Safety (Note: Includes free safety (FS) and strong safety (SS))	K — Kicker (Note: Also known as a placekicker (PK)); P — Punter; LS — Long snapper; RS — Return specialist (Note: Includes kickoff and punt returners)

=== Coaching staff changes ===
Name	Position	Reason	Replacement
Holmon Wiggins	Assistant Head Coach of Offense & Wide Receivers Coach	Accepted job at Texas A&M	JaMarcus Shephard
Coleman Hutzler	Outside linebackers coach & Special teams coordinator	Accepted job at Mississippi State	Christian Robinson
Kevin Steele	Defensive coordinator	Retired	Kane Wommack
Nick Saban	Head Coach	Retired	Kalen DeBoer
Travaris Robinson	Cornerbacks coach	Accepted job at Georgia	Maurice Linguist
Tommy Rees	Offensive coordinator/quarterbacks coach	Not Retained – Accepted job at Cleveland Browns	Nick Sheridan
Eric Wolford	Offensive line coach	Not Retained – Accepted job at Kentucky	Chris Kapilovic
Joe Cox	Tight end coach	Accepted job at Ole Miss	Bryan Ellis
Robert Bala	Safeties/Inside linebackers coach	Not Retained – Accepted job at Washington	Colin Hitschler

==== Coaching staff additions ====
Name	Previous Position	New Position
Jay Nunez	Sr. Special Teams analyst (Oklahoma)	Special Teams coordinator (Alabama)

=== NFL draft ===
The NFL draft was held at Campus Martius Park in Detroit, MI on April 25–27, 2024.

Crimson Tide who were picked in the 2024 NFL Draft:

Round	Pick	Player	Position	NFL team
1	7	JC Latham	OT	Tennessee Titans
1	17	Dallas Turner	LB	Minnesota Vikings
1	24	Terrion Arnold	CB	Detroit Lions
2	41	Kool-Aid McKinstry	CB	New Orleans Saints
2	57	Chris Braswell	LB	Tampa Bay Buccaneers
3	80	Jermaine Burton	WR	Cincinnati Bengals
4	105	Justin Eboigbe	DE	Los Angeles Chargers
6	186	Jase McClellan	RB	Atlanta Falcons
6	203	Will Reichard	K	Minnesota Vikings
7	257	Jaylen Key	SS	New York Jets

=== Transfer portal ===
Forty-one Alabama players elected to enter the NCAA Transfer Portal during or after the 2023 season. Over the off-season, Alabama added thirteen players from the transfer portal. According to 247 Sports, Alabama had the No. 3 ranked transfer class in the country.

- 2023 PT = 2023 Playing Time

Departing transfers
Name	No.	Pos.	Height/Weight	Class	Hometown	New school	Sources	2023 PT?
Caleb Downs	#2	S	6'0, 203	Freshman	Hoschton, GA	Ohio State		Yes
Kristian Story	#4	CB	6'1, 211	Senior	Lanett, AL	Kentucky		Yes
Roydell Williams	#5	RB	5'10, 214	Senior	Hueytown, AL	Florida State		Yes
Ja'Corey Brooks	#7	WR	6'3, 190	Junior	Miami, FL	Louisville		Yes
Tyler Buchner	#8	QB	6'1, 190	Redshirt Sophomore	San Diego, CA	Notre Dame		Yes
Trey Amos	#9	CB	6'1, 197	Senior	New Iberia, LA	Ole Miss		Yes
Eli Holstein	#10	QB	6'4, 237	Freshman	Zachary, LA	Pittsburgh		No
Malik Benson	#11	WR	6'1, 195	Junior	Lansing, KS	Florida State		Limited
Antonio Kite	#12	CB	6'1, 180	Redshirt Freshman	Anniston, AL	Auburn		Limited
Thaiu Jones-Bell	#14	WR	5'11, 187	Redshirt Junior	Hallandale, FL	TBD		No
Isaiah Bond	#17	WR	5'11, 182	Sophomore	Buford, GA	Texas		Yes
Shazz Preston	#18	WR	6’0, 202	Redshirt Freshman	Saint James, LA	Tulane		
Earl Little II	#20	CB	6'1, 186	Redshirt Freshman	Fort Lauderdale, FL	Florida State		Limited
Jake Pope	#21	CB	6'1, 192	Redshirt Freshman	Buford, GA	Georgia		
Jonathan Bennett	#27	RB	5’10, 180	Sophomore	Birmingham, AL	TBD	–	No
Tony Mitchell	#27	DB	6’2, 205	Sophomore	Alabaster, AL	TBD		No
Dezz Ricks	#29	DB	6'2, 182	Freshman	Chesapeake, VA	Texas A&M		No
Darien Clayborne	#29	RB	5'9, 195	Freshman	Lakeville, MN	TBD	–	No
Terrance Howard	#34	DB	6'6, 232	Freshman	Missouri City, TX	TBD	–	No
Zarian Courtney	#35	WR	6'6, 232	Redshirt Freshman	Arlington, TX	TBD	–	No
Ian Jackson	#36	LB	6'1, 235	Redshirt Sophomore	Prattville, AL	UTSA		No
Sawyer Deerman	#36	WR	5'10, 175	Sophomore	Northport, AL	San Jose State	–	No
Sam Willoughby	#37	WR	5'10, 165	Senior	Vestavia Hills, AL	TBD	–	No
Kendrick Blackshire	#40	LB	6'2, 233	Junior	Duncanville, TX	Texas		Limited
Shawn Murphy	#43	LB	6'2, 225	Redshirt Freshman	Manassas, VA	Florida State		Limited
Robert Ellis	#43	TE	6’0, 220	Senior	Enterprise, AL	TBD	–	No
Charlie Skehan	#44	TE	6’1, 232	Sophomore	Columbia, SC	TBD		
Hayden Neighbors	#48	WR	6’3, 185	Junior	Huntsville, AL	Nicholls		
Jax Porter	#49	TE	6'6, 232	Redshirt Freshman	Dallas, TX	TCU	–	No
Brock O'Quinn	#50	LS	6'1, 210	Freshman	Southlake, TX	TBD	–	No
Seth McLaughlin	#56	OL	6’4, 305	Senior	Buford, GA	Ohio State		Yes
James Brockermeyer	#58	OL	6'3, 285	Redshirt Junior	Fort Worth, TX	TCU		No
Anquin Barnes	#59	DL	6'5, 299	Redshirt Sophomore	Montgomery, AL	Colorado		No
Terrance Ferguson II	#69	OL	6'4, 290	Redshirt Sophomore	Fort Valley, GA	Florida State		Limited
Andre Craig Jr.	#83	WR	6'0, 180	Freshman	Locust Grove, GA	Alabama A&M	–	No
Amari Niblack	#84	TE	6'4, 233	Sophomore	Saint Petersburg, FL	Texas		Yes
Miles Kitselman	#88	TE	6'5, 250	Junior	Lyndon, KS	Tennessee		Yes
Monkell Goodwine	#95	DL	6'4, 290	Redshirt Sophomore	Upper Marlboro, MD	South Carolina		limited
Khurtiss Perry	#97	DL	6'2, 265	Redshirt Sophomore	Pike Road, AL	Virginia Tech		No
Upton Bellenfant	#98	K	6'2, 175	Sophomore	Murfreesboro, TN	Buffalo	–	No
Isaiah Hastings	#99	DL	6'4, 290	Redshirt Freshman	Toronto, ON	Syracuse		No

Incoming transfers
Name	No.	Pos.	Height/Weight	Hometown	Year	Prev. school	Sources
Domani Jackson	#1	CB	6'1, 190	Santa Ana, CA	Sophomore	USC	
LT Overton	#18	DL	6'3, 265	Milton, GA	Sophomore	Texas A&M	
Naquil Bertrand	#52	OL	6'6, 340	Philadelphia, PA	Freshman	Texas A&M	
Austin Mack	#10	QB	6'6, 226	Folsom, CA	Redshirt Freshman	Washington	
Parker Brailsford	#72	OL	6'2, 275	Mesa, AZ	Freshman	Washington	
Germie Bernard	#4	WR	6'1, 203	Las Vegas, NV	Sophomore	Washington	
Keon Sabb	#3	S	6'1, 208	Glassboro, NJ	Sophomore	Michigan	
Josh Cuevas	#85	TE	6'3, 239	Los Angeles, CA	Sophomore	Washington	
Graham Nicholson	#96	K	6'0, 185	Cincinnati, OH	Junior	Miami (OH)	
Kameron Howard	#16	DB	5'11, 189	Clinton, MD	Freshman	Charlotte	
DaShawn Jones	#10	DB	6'0, 181	Baltimore, MD	Redshirt Sophomore	Wake Forest	
King Mack	#9	DB	5'10, 188	Miami, FL	Freshman	Penn State	
Gene VanDeMark	#74	OL	6'5, 320	Lodi, NJ	Redshirt Sophomore	Michigan State	

Note: Players with a dash in the new school column didn't land on a new team for the 2024 season.

=== Recruiting class ===
College recruiting
Name	Hometown	School	Height	Weight	Commit date
Jaylen Mbakwe; Cornerback	Pinson, AL	Clay-Chalkville High School	6 ft 0 in (1.83 m)	175 lb (79 kg)	Jul 26, 2022
Jaylen Mbakwe; Cornerback	Recruit ratings: Rivals: 247Sports: On3: ESPN: (92)				
Ryan Coleman-Williams*; Wide receiver	Saraland, AL	Saraland High School	6 ft 1 in (1.85 m)	175 lb (79 kg)	Jan 24, 2024
Ryan Coleman-Williams*; Wide receiver	Recruit ratings: Rivals: 247Sports: On3: ESPN: (92)				
Zay Mincey; Safety	Daytona Beach, FL	Mainland High School	6 ft 3 in (1.91 m)	180 lb (82 kg)	Jan 6, 2024
Zay Mincey; Safety	Recruit ratings: Rivals: 247Sports: On3: ESPN: (86)				
Caleb Odom; Tight end	Carrollton, GA	Carrollton High School	6 ft 5 in (1.96 m)	215 lb (98 kg)	Jul 15, 2023
Caleb Odom; Tight end	Recruit ratings: Rivals: 247Sports: On3: ESPN: (84)				
Zabien Brown; Cornerback	Santa Ana, CA	Mater Dei High School	6 ft 0 in (1.83 m)	180 lb (82 kg)	Jul 9, 2023
Zabien Brown; Cornerback	Recruit ratings: Rivals: 247Sports: On3: ESPN: (84)				
Kevin Riley; Running back	Northport, AL	Tuscaloosa County High School	5 ft 11 in (1.80 m)	200 lb (91 kg)	Dec 20, 2023
Kevin Riley; Running back	Recruit ratings: Rivals: 247Sports: ESPN: (84)				
Casey Poe; Offensive guard	Lindale, TX	Lindale High School	6 ft 5 in (1.96 m)	285 lb (129 kg)	Jul 12, 2023
Casey Poe; Offensive guard	Recruit ratings: Rivals: 247Sports: On3: ESPN: (84)				
Jeremiah Beaman; Defensive tackle	Birmingham, AL	A. H. Parker High School	6 ft 4 in (1.93 m)	255 lb (116 kg)	May 21, 2023
Jeremiah Beaman; Defensive tackle	Recruit ratings: Rivals: 247Sports: On3: ESPN: (83)				
Cayden Jones; Linebacker	Arden, NC	Christ School	6 ft 4 in (1.93 m)	215 lb (98 kg)	Jul 20, 2022
Cayden Jones; Linebacker	Recruit ratings: Rivals: 247Sports: On3: ESPN: (83)				
Daniel Hill; Running back	Meridian, MS	Meridian High School	6 ft 1 in (1.85 m)	220 lb (100 kg)	Jan 6, 2024
Daniel Hill; Running back	Recruit ratings: Rivals: 247Sports: On3: ESPN: (83)				
Noah Carter; Defensive end	Peoria, AZ	Centennial High School	6 ft 3 in (1.91 m)	225 lb (102 kg)	Jan 25, 2024
Noah Carter; Defensive end	Recruit ratings: Rivals: 247Sports: On3: ESPN: (83)				
Aeryn Hampton; Defensive back	Daingerfield, TX	Daingerfield High School	5 ft 10 in (1.78 m)	175 lb (79 kg)	Dec 20, 2023
Aeryn Hampton; Defensive back	Recruit ratings: Rivals: 247Sports: ESPN: (82)				
Amari Jefferson; Wide receiver	Chattanooga, TN	Baylor School	6 ft 1 in (1.85 m)	190 lb (86 kg)	Aug 5, 2023
Amari Jefferson; Wide receiver	Recruit ratings: Rivals: 247Sports: On3: ESPN: (81)				
Sterling Dixon; Defensive end	Mobile, AL	Mobile Christian High School	6 ft 4 in (1.93 m)	215 lb (98 kg)	Dec 1, 2022
Sterling Dixon; Defensive end	Recruit ratings: Rivals: 247Sports: On3: ESPN: (81)				
Rico Scott; Wide receiver	Harrisburg, PA	Bishop McDevitt High School	6 ft 0 in (1.83 m)	190 lb (86 kg)	Apr 16, 2023
Rico Scott; Wide receiver	Recruit ratings: Rivals: 247Sports: On3: ESPN: (81)				
Jayshawn Ross; Outside linebacker	Kansas City, MO	Liberty North High School	6 ft 3 in (1.91 m)	220 lb (100 kg)	Dec 18, 2023
Jayshawn Ross; Outside linebacker	Recruit ratings: Rivals: 247Sports: On3: ESPN: (81)				
Isaiah Faga; Defensive tackle	Phenix City, AL	Central High School	6 ft 3 in (1.91 m)	275 lb (125 kg)	Jun 28, 2023
Isaiah Faga; Defensive tackle	Recruit ratings: Rivals: 247Sports: On3: ESPN: (79)				
Justin Okoronkwo; Linebacker	Nürnberg, GER	Nürnberg Rams	6 ft 3 in (1.91 m)	215 lb (98 kg)	Jul 9, 2023
Justin Okoronkwo; Linebacker	Recruit ratings: Rivals: 247Sports: On3: ESPN: (79)				
William Sanders; Offensive guard	Brookwood, AL	Brookwood High School	6 ft 3 in (1.91 m)	295 lb (134 kg)	Jul 21, 2023
William Sanders; Offensive guard	Recruit ratings: Rivals: 247Sports: On3: ESPN: (78)				
Rydarrius Morgan; Safety	Phenix City, AL	Central High School	5 ft 11 in (1.80 m)	180 lb (82 kg)	Aug 9, 2023
Rydarrius Morgan; Safety	Recruit ratings: Rivals: 247Sports: On3: ESPN: (78)				
Jay Lindsey; Tight end	Butler, AL	Patrician Academy	6 ft 5 in (1.96 m)	235 lb (107 kg)	Aug 29, 2023
Jay Lindsey; Tight end	Recruit ratings: Rivals: 247Sports: On3: ESPN: (78)				
Dre Kirkpatrick Jr; Safety	Gadsden, AL	Gadsden City High School	5 ft 11 in (1.80 m)	190 lb (86 kg)	Aug 18, 2023
Dre Kirkpatrick Jr; Safety	Recruit ratings: Rivals: 247Sports: On3: ESPN: (77)				
Joseph Ionata; Offensive guard	Clearwater, FL	Calvary Christian High School	6 ft 4 in (1.93 m)	280 lb (130 kg)	Jun 3, 2023
Joseph Ionata; Offensive guard	Recruit ratings: Rivals: 247Sports: On3: ESPN: (77)				
Quinton Reese; Inside linebacker	Birmingham, AL	Ramsay High School	6 ft 4 in (1.93 m)	280 lb (130 kg)	Sep 16, 2023
Quinton Reese; Inside linebacker	Recruit ratings: Rivals: 247Sports: On3: ESPN: (76)				
Overall recruit ranking: Rivals: 2 247Sports: 2 On3: 2
‡ Refers to 40-yard dash; Note: In many cases, Scout, Rivals, 247Sports, On3, and ESPN may conflict in their listings of height, weight and 40 time.; In these cases, the average was taken. ESPN grades are on a 100-point scale.; Sources: "Alabama Football Commitment List". Rivals.; "2024 Player commitments – Alabama". ESPN.; "2024 Team Ranking". Rivals.com.; "Alabama Football 2024 commits". 247Sports.

*Originally class of 2025, but reclassified to 2024.

*= 247Sports Composite rating; ratings are out of 1.00. (five stars= 1.00–.98, four stars= .97–.90, three stars= .80–.89)
†= Despite being rated as a four and five star recruit by ESPN, On3.com, Rivals.com and 247Sports.com, Mbakwe and Williams received a five star 247Sports Composite rating.
Δ= Julian Sayin, Peyton Woodyard and Jameer Grimsley left the Alabama program following signing but prior to the 2024 season.

2024 Overall class rankings

Website	National rank	Conference rank	5 star recruits	4 star recruits	3 star recruits	Total
ESPN	–	–	2	16	8	32
On3 Recruits	#2	#2	4	16	6	26
Rivals	#2	#2	4	17	7	28
247 Sports	#2	#2	6	24	12	43

Walks-ons

Name	Pos.	Height/Weight	Hometown	High school
Tucker Cornelius	K	6'3, 185	Tuscaloosa, AL	Northridge High School
Anderson Green	P	6'0, 205	Tuscaloosa, AL	Northridge High School
Jay Williams	LS	6'1, 195	Ringgold, GA	Heritage High School
Ayden Moore	DE	6'2, 230	Trussville, AL	Hewitt-Trussville High School
Jackson Howell	OL	6'5, 315	Trussville, AL	Hewitt-Trussville High School
Cole Davis	QB	6'0, 195	Walterboro, SC	Colleton Preparatory Academy

== Preseason ==
=== Spring game ===
The Crimson Tide held 15 spring practices on March 8–17, 2024. The Alabama football spring game, "A-Day" took place in Tuscaloosa, Alabama, on April 13, 2024, with the Crimson team beating the White team 34–28.

=== Preseason media day ===
The 2024 SEC Media days were held on July 15–18, 2024 at Omni Hotel Dallas in downtown Dallas, TX. The Preseason Polls were released July 2024. Each team had their head coach available to talk to the media at the event on July 17, 2024, with Kalen DeBoer (HC), Jalen Milroe (QB), Tyler Booker (OL) and Malachi Moore (DB). Coverage of the event was televised on SEC Network and ESPN.

SEC media poll
Predicted finish	Team	Votes (1st place)
1	Georgia	3330 (165)
2	Texas	3041 (27)
3	Alabama	2891 (12)
4	Ole Miss	2783 (4)
5	LSU	2322 (2)
6	Missouri	2240
7	Tennessee	2168
8	Oklahoma	2022
9	Texas A&M	1684
10	Auburn	1382
11	Kentucky	1371
12	Florida	1146
13	South Carolina	923 (1)
14	Arkansas	749
15	Mississippi State	623
16	Vanderbilt	293 (2)

Media poll (SEC Championship)
Rank	Team	Votes
1	Georgia	165
2	Texas	27
3	Alabama	12
4	Ole Miss	4
5	LSU	2
6	Vanderbilt	2
7	South Carolina	1

=== Preseason All-SEC teams ===
==== Media ====
First Team

Position	Player	Class
Offense
OL	Tyler Booker	Jr.
Defense
LB	Deontae Lawson	Jr.
DB	Malachi Moore	Graduate
Special teams
P	James Burnip	Sr.
LS	Kneeland Hibbet	Sr.

Second Team

Position	Player	Class
Offense
OL	Kadyn Proctor	So.
OL	Parker Brailsford	So.
Defense
DL	Tim Smith	Graduate
Special teams
PK	Graham Nicholson	Sr.

Third Team

Position	Player	Class
Offense
QB	Jalen Milroe	Jr.
RB	Justice Haynes	So.
OL	Jaeden Roberts	Jr.
Defense
DL	Tim Keenan III	Jr.
LB	Jihaad Campbell	Jr.
DB	Domani Jackson	Jr.
DB	Keon Sabb	Jr.

==== Coaches ====
First Team

Position	Player	Class
Offense
OL	Tyler Booker	Jr.
Defense
LB	Deontae Lawson	Jr.
DB	Malachi Moore	Graduate
Special teams
PK	James Burnip	Sr.

Second Team

Position	Player	Class
Offense
Ol	Kadyn Proctor	So.
Ol	Parker Brailsford	So.
Defense
DL	Tim Smith	Graduate
Special teams
PK	Graham Nicholson	Sr.
LS	Kneeland Hibbet	Sr.

Third Team

Position	Player	Class
Offense
QB	Jalen Milroe	Jr.
RB	Justice Haynes	So.
Defense
DL	Tim Keenan III	Jr.
LB	Jihaad Campbell	Jr.
DB	Domani Jackson	Jr.

=== Preseason All-Americans ===
Pre-season All-American Honors
Player	Position	Class	Designation	AP	Athlon	CBS Sports	CFN	ESPN	PFF	SI	SN	USAT	WCFF
Parker Brailsford	Guard	Sophomore	1st Team Offense; Unanimous	✓	✓	✓	✓	✓	✓	✓	✓	✓	–
Tyler Booker	Guard	Junior	1st Team Offense; Unanimous	–	✓	–	✓	✓	✓	✓	–	–	✓
Graham Nicholson	Kicker	Senior	1st Team Special Team; Unanimous	✓	✓	✓	✓	✓	✓	✓	✓	✓	✓
James Burnip	Punter	Senior	1st Team Special Team	–	✓	–	–	–	–	–	–	–	–

Other All-Americans teams
Player	Position	Class	Selector(s)
Parker Brailsford	Guard	Sophomore	2nd Team Offense (WCFF)
Tyler Booker	Guard	Junior	2nd Team Offense (AP, USAT, CBS, SN)
Jalen Milroe	Quarterback	Junior	3rd Team Offense (Athlon); Honorable Mention (SI)
Deontae Lawson	Linebacker	Junior	3rd Team Defense (Athlon); 2nd Team Defense (USAT, CBS, ESPN); Honorable Mention (SI)
Malachi Moore	'Safety	Graduate	2nd Team Defense (Athlon, SN, CBS)
James Burnip	Punter	Senior	2nd Team Special Team (WCFF, SI, ESPN)

=== Award watch lists ===
Listed in the order that they were released

Award	Player	Position	Year	Source
Lott Trophy	Deontae Lawson	LB	R-Jr.	
Lott Trophy	Malachi Moore	CB	Gr.	
Maxwell Award	Jalen Milroe	QB	R-Jr.	
Patrick Mannelly Award	Kneeland Hibbett	LS	Sr.	
Outland Trophy	Tyler Booker	OL	Jr.	
Outland Trophy	Parker Brailsford	OL	R-So.	
Outland Trophy	Tim Smith	DL	Gr.	
Bronko Nagurski Award	Malachi Moore	CB	Gr.	
Bronko Nagurski Award	Deontae Lawson	LB	R-Jr.	
Jim Thorpe Award	Malachi Moore	CB	Gr.	
Wuerffel Trophy	Tim Keenan II	DB	Jr.	
Lou Groza Award	Graham Nicholson	PK	Sr.	
Ray Guy Award	James Burnip	P	Sr.	
Walter Camp Award	Jalen Milroe	QB	R-Jr.	
Walter Camp Award	Malachi Moore	CB	Gr.	
Doak Walker Award	Jam Miller	RB	Jr.	
Doak Walker Award	Justice Haynes	RB	So.	
Davey O'Brien Award	Jalen Milroe	QB	R-Jr.	
John Mackey Award	CJ Dippre	TE	Sr.	
Rimington Trophy	Parker Brailsford	OL	R-So.	
Bednarik Award	Deontae Lawson	LB	R-Jr.	
Bednarik Award	Malachi Moore	CB	Gr.	
Butkus Award	Jihaad Campbell	LB	Jr.	
Butkus Award	Deontae Lawson	LB	R-Jr.	
Johnny Unitas Golden Arm Award	Jalen Milroe	QB	R-Jr.	
Manning Award	Jalen Milroe	QB	R-Jr.	
Rotary Lombardi Award	Deontae Lawson	LB	R-Jr.	
Rotary Lombardi Award	Jaeden Roberts	OL	R-Jr.	
Rotary Lombardi Award	Parker Brailsford	OL	R-So.	
Rotary Lombardi Award	Tyler Booker	OL	Jr.	
Earl Campbell Tyler Rose Award	Jalen Milroe	QB	R-Jr.	

== Personnel ==
=== Roster ===
2024 Alabama Crimson Tide Football
Quarterbacks: 4 – Jalen Milroe – (redshirt) Junior (6'2, 220); 10 – Austin Mack – (redshirt) Freshman (6'6, 226); 12 – Dylan Lonergan – (redshirt) Freshman (6'2, 212); 15 – Ty Simpson – (redshirt) Sophomore (6'2, 203); 16 – Cade Carruth – Junior (6'1, 195); 19 – John Cooper – Freshman (6'2, 192); Running backs: 9 – Richard Young – (redshirt) Freshman (5'11, 200); 20 – Daniel Hill – Freshman (6'1, 231); 22 – Justice Haynes – Sophomore (5'11, 205); 26 – Jam Miller – Junior (5'10, 211); 27 – Michael Lorino III – Junior (6'0, 185); 28 – Kevin Riley – Freshman (5'11, 200); 29 – Fredrick Moore – Freshman (5'9, 160); 41 – JR Gardner – Sophomore (5'11, 185); Wide receivers: 1 – Kendrick Law – Junior (5'11, 201); 2 – Ryan Coleman-Williams – Freshman (6'1, 175); 3 – Emmanuel Henderson – Junior (6'1, 185); 5 – Germie Bernard – Junior (6'1, 203); 6 – Kobe Prentice – Junior (5'10, 182); 11 – Rico Scott – Freshman (6'1, 185); 13 – Cole Adams – (redshirt) Freshman (5'10, 186); 14 – Jalen Hale – Sophomore (6'1, 189); 16 – Jaren Hamilton – (redshirt) Freshman (6'1, 200); 17 – Amari Jefferson – Freshman (6'1, 190); 18 – Caleb Odom – Freshman (6'5, 215); 21 – Bubba Hampton – Freshman (5'10, 175); 32 – Jay Loper Jr. – Junior (5'11, 180); 33 – Jack Standeffer – Junior (5'10, 160); 39 – Kaleb Fleming – Junior (6'1, 205); 42 – MJ Chirgwin – Junior (6'0, 195); 82 – Miguel Camboia – Sophomore (6'1, 190); 83 – Cooper Mollison – Freshman (5'10, 185); 84 – Colby Cruz – Junior (5'10, 170); Tight ends: 34 – Colby McNeal – (redshirt) Junior (6'5, 250); 45 – Robbie Ouzts – Senior (6'4, 258); 46 – Peyton Fox – Junior (6'4, 225); 47 – Adam Thorsland – Senior (6'5, 232); 80 – Josh Cuevas – (redshirt) Junior (6'3, 239); 81 – CJ Dippre – Senior (6'5, 257); 87 – Danny Lewis Jr. – (redshirt) Sophomore (6'5, 255); 88 – Jay Lindsey – Freshman (6'5, 235); 89 – Ty Lockwood – (redshirt) Freshman (6'5, 234); Kicker/Punter: 14 – Graham Nicholson – Senior (6'0, 185) (K); 31 – Conor Talty – (redshirt) Freshman (6'2, 195) (K); 86 – James Burnip – (redshirt) Senior (6'6, 220) (P); 95 – Anderson Green – Freshman (6'0, 205) (P); 97 – Reid Schuback – Senior (6'0, 185) (K); 98 – Tucker Cornelius – Freshman (6'3, 185) (K); 99 – Nick Serpa – Junior (6'4, 215) (P); Long snappers: 45 – Jay Williams – Freshman (6'1, 195); 48 – Kneeland Hibbett – Senior (6'2, 245); 52 – Alex Rozier – Sophomore (6'4, 220); 53 – Kade Wehby – Senior (5'9, 185)	Offensive Lineman: 50 – Casey Poe – Freshman (6'4, 290); 52 – Tyler Booker – Junior (6'5, 352); 54 – Miles McVay – (redshirt) Freshman (6'6, 350); 55 – Roq Montgomery – (redshirt) Freshman (6'3, 332); 56 – Geno VanDeMark – (redshirt) Junior (6'5, 320); 57 – Elijah Pritchett – (redshirt) Sophomore (6'6, 312); 61 – Graham Roten – Senior (6'3, 285); 62 – Davis Peterson – Sophomore (6'1, 235); 63 – Diego Camboia – Freshman (6'5, 287); 64 – Mac Smith – Sophomore (6'3, 270); 65 – Naquil Bertrand – (redshirt) Freshman (6'6, 340); 66 – Baker Hickman – Sophomore (6'3, 315); 67 – Wade Estess – Freshman (6'3, 305); 68 – Billy Roby – Sophomore (5'11, 245); 69 – Joseph Ionata – Freshman (6'5, 294); 70 – William Sanders – Freshman (6'3, 290); 71 – Jackson Howell – Freshman (6'5, 315); 72 – Parker Brailsford – (redshirt) Sophomore (6'2, 275); 73 – Olaus Alinen – (redshirt) Freshman (6'6, 326); 74 – Kadyn Proctor – Sophomore (6'7, 360); 75 – Wilkin Formby – (redshirt) Freshman (6'7, 320); 76 – JD Martin – Freshman (6'2, 240); 77 – Jaeden Roberts – (redshirt) Junior (6'5, 316); Defensive Lineman: 10 – Jeheim Oatis – Junior (6'5, 320); 20 – Jah-Marien Latham – (redshirt) Senior (6'3, 275); 22 – LT Overton – Junior (6'3, 265); 23 – James Smith – Sophomore (6'3, 296); 33 – Hunter Osborne – (redshirt) Freshman (6'4, 275); 44 – Damon Payne Jr. – (redshirt) Junior (6'4, 303); 50 – Tim Smith – Graduate Student (6'4, 302); 88 – Isaia Faga – Freshman (6'2, 275); 90 – Jordan Renaud – (redshirt) Freshman (6'4, 261); 92 – Jeremiah Beaman – Freshman (6'4, 265); 94 – Edric Hill – (redshirt) Freshman (6'3, 294); 96 – Tim Keenan III – (redshirt) Junior (6'2, 315)	Linebackers: 0 – Deontae Lawson – (redshirt) Junior (6'2, 230); 4 – Qua Russaw – (redshirt) Freshman (6'3, 242); 11 – Jihaad Campbell – Junior (6'3, 230); 15 – Justin Jefferson – Senior (6'2, 225); 19 – Keanu Koht – (redshirt) Junior (6'4, 232); 24 – Noah Carter – Freshman (6'4, 220); 29 – Ayden Moore – Freshman (6'2, 230); 30 – Cayden Jones – Freshman (6'4, 210); 31 – Keon Keeley – (redshirt) Freshman (6'5, 242); 34 – Que Robinson – (redshirt) Senior (6'5, 231); 35 – Jeremiah Alexander – (redshirt) Sophomore (6'2, 249); 36 – QB Reese – Freshman (6'4, 280); 39 – Jake Ivie – Sophomore (6'0, 205); 40 – Sterling Dixon – Freshman (6'3, 211); 41 – Justin Okoronkwo – Freshman (6'3, 215); 42 – Yhonzae Pierre – (redshirt) Freshman (6'3, 223); 43 – Jayshawn Ross – Freshman (6'4, 220); 51 – Noland Asberry – Junior (6'1, 190); 52 – Braylon Chatman – Sophomore (6'0, 200); 53 – Vito Perri – (redshirt) Sophomore (6'0, 205); 56 – JD Baird – Junior (5'8, 190); 85 – Lane Whisenhunt – Sophomore (6'2, 285); Defensive backs: 1 – Domani Jackson – (redshirt) Junior (6'1, 190); 2 – Zabien Brown – Freshman (6'0, 180); 3 – Keon Sabb – Junior (6'1, 208); 5 – King Mack – Sophomore (5'10, 188); 6 – Kameron Howard – Freshman (5'11, 189); 7 – DaShawn Jones – (redshirt) Sophomore (6'0, 181); 8 – DeVonta Smith – (redshirt) Junior (6'0, 194); 9 – Jaylen Mbakwe – Freshman (5'11, 170); 12 – Zavier Mincey – Freshman (6'3, 180); 13 – Malachi Moore – Graduate Student (6'0, 198); 16 – Red Morgan – Freshman (6'0, 175); 18 – Bray Hubbard – Sophomore (6'2, 195); 21 – Dre Kirkpatrick Jr – Freshman (5'11, 192); 25 – Jahlil Hurley – (redshirt) Freshman (6'2, 170); 26 – Ryder Stewart – Freshman (5'10, 165); 27 – Walter Sansing – Sophomore (5'10, 160); 28 – Peyton Yates – Junior (5'10, 180); 32 – Griffin Hanson – Freshman (5'10, 160); 37 – Cole Davis – Freshman (6'0, 200); 38 – Alijah May – Senior (5'11, 195); 46 – Chase Davis – Junior (6'1, 182); 47 – Kolby Peavy – Sophomore (6'1, 180); 48 – Prince Butler – Junior (6'1, 200); 49 – Connor Warhurst – Sophomore (6'2, 190)
Legend: (C) Team captain; (S) Suspended; (I) Ineligible; Injured; Redshirt
Source and player details, 2024 Alabama Crimson Tide Football Commits (07/17/2024):

=== Coaching staff ===
Alabama head coach Kalen DeBoer entered his first year as the Crimson Tide's head coach for the 2024 season. During his previous seventeen years with Alabama, Saban led the Crimson Tide to an overall record of 201 wins and 29 losses (.874) and the 2009, 2011, 2012, 2015, 2017 and 2020 national championships.

Name	Position	Consecutive season at Alabama in current position
Kalen DeBoer	Head coach	1st
Nick Sheridan	Offensive coordinator / quarterbacks coach	1st
JaMarcus Shephard	Assistant head coach / co-offensive coordinator / wide receivers coach	1st
Kane Wommack	Defensive coordinator / inside linebackers coach	1st
Maurice Linguist	Co-defensive coordinator / defensive backs coach	1st
Colin Hitschler	Co-defensive coordinator / safeties coach	1st
Bryan Ellis	Tight ends coach	1st
Robert Gillespie	Assistant head coach / running backs coach	4th
Chris Kapilovic	Offensive line coach	1st
Freddie Roach	Associate head coach / defensive line coach	5th
Christian Robinson	Outside linebackers coach	1st
Jay Nunez	Special assistant to head coach / special teams senior analyst	1st
Chuck Morrell	Special assistant to head coach	1st
David Ballou	Strength and conditioning coach	5th
Reference: 2024 Alabama Crimson Tide Football Media Guide

=== Returning starters ===
Offense

Player	Position	Class	Games started
Jalen Milroe	R-Jr.	Quarterback	
Justice Haynes	Sophomore	Running back	
Kendrick Law	Junior	Wide receiver	
CJ Dippre	Senior	Tight end	
Tyler Booker	Junior	Guard	

Defense

Player	Position	Class	Games started
Jeheim Oatis	Junior	Defensive end	
Deontae Lawson	R-Jr.	Linebacker	
Malachi Moore	Graduate	Safety	

Special teams

Player	Position	Class	Games started
James Burnip	R-Sr.	Punter	

== Schedule ==
Date	Time	Opponent	Rank	Site	TV	Result	Attendance
August 31	6:00 p.m.	Western Kentucky*	No. 5	Bryant–Denny Stadium; Tuscaloosa, AL	ESPN	W 63–0	100,077
September 7	6:00 p.m.	South Florida*	No. 4	Bryant–Denny Stadium; Tuscaloosa, AL	ESPN	W 42–16	100,077
September 14	11:00 a.m.	at Wisconsin*	No. 4	Camp Randall Stadium; Madison, WI (Big Noon Kickoff)	FOX	W 42–10	76,323
September 28	6:30 p.m.	No. 2 Georgia	No. 4	Bryant–Denny Stadium; Tuscaloosa, AL (rivalry, College GameDay)	ABC	W 41–34	100,077
October 5	3:15 p.m.	at Vanderbilt	No. 1	FirstBank Stadium; Nashville, TN	SECN	L 35–40	28,934
October 12	11:00 a.m.	South Carolina	No. 7	Bryant–Denny Stadium; Tuscaloosa, AL	ABC	W 27–25	100,077
October 19	2:30 p.m.	at No. 11 Tennessee	No. 7	Neyland Stadium; Knoxville, TN (Third Saturday in October, SEC Nation)	ABC	L 17–24	101,915
October 26	2:30 p.m.	No. 21 Missouri^{†}	No. 15	Bryant–Denny Stadium; Tuscaloosa, AL (SEC Nation)	ABC	W 34–0	100,077
November 9	6:30 p.m.	at No. 15 LSU	No. 11	Tiger Stadium; Baton Rouge, LA (rivalry, College GameDay)	ABC	W 42–13	102,283
November 16	1:00 p.m.	No. 7 (FCS) Mercer*	No. 10	Bryant–Denny Stadium; Tuscaloosa, AL	SECN+/ESPN+	W 52–7	100,077
November 23	6:30 p.m.	at Oklahoma	No. 7	Gaylord Family Oklahoma Memorial Stadium; Norman, OK	ABC	L 3–24	84,053
November 30	2:30 p.m.	Auburn	No. 13	Bryant–Denny Stadium; Tuscaloosa, AL (Iron Bowl, SEC Nation)	ABC	W 28–14	100,077
December 31	11:00 a.m.	vs. Michigan	No. 11	Raymond James Stadium; Tampa, FL (ReliaQuest Bowl)	ESPN	L 13–19	51,439
*Non-conference game; ^{†}Homecoming; Rankings from AP Poll (and CFP Rankings, after November 5) – Released prior to game; All times are in Central time

== Game summaries ==
=== Western Kentucky ===
Western Kentucky Hilltoppers at No. 5 Alabama Crimson Tide – Game summary

Quarter	1	2	3	4	Total
Hilltoppers	0	0	0	0	0
No. 5 Crimson Tide	21	21	14	7	63

at Bryant–Denny Stadium, Tuscaloosa, AL

- Date: August 31
- Game time: 6:06 p.m. CDT
- Game weather: 85°F, Wind SE @ 3 mph
- Game attendance: 100,077
- Referee: Matt Loeffler
- TV announcers (ESPN): Dave Pasch (play-by-play), Dusty Dvoracek (analyst), and Taylor McGregor (sideline)

Game information

First quarter

- (10:07) ALA – Jalen Milroe 12-yard run (Graham Nicholson kick) (Drive: 2 plays, 16 yards, 0:41; Alabama 7-0)
- (5:01) ALA – Kendrick Law 22-yard pass from Jalen Milroe (Graham Nicholson kick) (Drive: 3 plays, 26 yards, 1:31; Alabama 14-0)
- (2:27) ALA – Ryan Coleman-Williams 84-yard pass from Jalen Milroe (Graham Nicholson kick) (Drive: 4 plays, 81 yards, 1:19; Alabama 21-0)

Second quarter

- (12:35) ALA – Jam Miller 39-yard run (Graham Nicholson kick) (Drive: 2 plays, 80 yards, 1:14; Alabama 28-0)
- (2:53) ALA – Justice Haynes 85-yard run (Graham Nicholson kick) (Drive: 2 plays, 96 yards, 0:33; Alabama 35-0)
- (1:30) ALA – Ryan Williams 55-yard pass from Jalen Milroe (Graham Nicholson kick) (Drive: 2 plays, 55 yards, 0:15; Alabama 42-0)

Third quarter

- (6:30) ALA – Jalen Milroe 21-yard run (Graham Nicholson kick) (Drive: 9 plays, 61 yards, 4:10; Alabama 49-0)
- (2:51) ALA – Daniel Hill 2-yard run (Conor Talty kick) (Drive: 6 plays, 53 yards, 2:47; Alabama 56-0)

Fourth quarter

- (10:04) ALA – Ty Simpson 15-yard run (Conor Talty kick) (Drive: 10 plays, 79 yards, 3:58; Alabama 63-0)

Statistics	WKU	ALA
First downs	10	25
Total yards	145	600
Rushing yards	42	334
Passing yards	103	266
Turnovers	2	1
Time of possession	29:25	30:35

Team	Category	Player	Statistics
Western Kentucky	Passing	TJ Finley	18/31, 92 yards, 2 INTs
Western Kentucky	Rushing	Elijah Young	10 carries, 18 yards
Western Kentucky	Receiving	Moussa Barry	4 receptions, 27 yards
Alabama	Passing	Jalen Milroe	7/9, 200 yards, 3 TDs
Alabama	Rushing	Justice Haynes	4 carries, 102 yards, 1 TD
Alabama	Receiving	Ryan Coleman-Williams	2 receptions, 139 yards, 2 TDs

=== South Florida ===
South Florida Bulls at No. 4 Alabama Crimson Tide – Game summary

Quarter	1	2	3	4	Total
Bulls	3	3	7	3	16
No. 4 Crimson Tide	7	7	0	28	42

at Bryant–Denny Stadium, Tuscaloosa, AL

- Date: September 7
- Game time: 6:10 p.m. CDT
- Game weather: 81°F, Sunny, Wind S @ 9 mph
- Game attendance: 100,077
- Referee: Ken Williamson
- TV announcers (ESPN): Joe Tessitore (play-by-play), Jesse Palmer (analyst), and Katie George (sideline)

Game information

First quarter

- (11:26) USF – John Cannon 34-yard field goal (Drive: 13 plays, 60 yards, 3:34; South Florida 3–0)
- (5:08) ALA – Jalen Milroe 10-yard run, Graham Nicholson kick (Drive: 10 plays, 65 yards, 3:59; Alabama 7–3)

Second quarter

- (9:45) USF – John Cannon 25-yard field goal (Drive: 9 plays, 50 yards, 3:15; Alabama 7–6)
- (3:28) ALA – Jalen Milroe 5-yard run, Graham Nicholson kick (Drive: 11 plays, 75 yards, 6:17; Alabama 14–6)

Third quarter

- (9:35) USF – Ta'Ron Keith 2-yard run, John Cannon kick (Drive: 5 plays, 39 yards, 1:20; Alabama 14–13)

Fourth quarter

- (10:04) ALA – Kobe Prentice 16-yard pass from Jalen Milroe, Graham Nicholson kick (Drive: 4 plays, 34 yards, 1:46; Alabama 21–13)
- (6:45) USF – John Cannon 22-yard field goal (Drive: 8 plays, 71 yards, 3:19; Alabama 21–16)
- (5:50) ALA – Ryan Coleman-Williams 43-yard pass from Jalen Milroe, Graham Nicholson kick (Drive: 3 plays, 75 yards, 0:55; Alabama 28–16)
- (2:30) ALA – Jam Miller 56-yard run, Graham Nicholson kick (Drive: 2 plays, 60 yards, 0:50; Alabama 35–16)
- (1:37) ALA – Justice Haynes 29-yard run, Graham Nicholson kick (Drive: 1 play, 29 yards, 0:10; Alabama 42–16)

Statistics	USF	ALA
First downs	21	20
Total yards	309	393
Rushing yards	206	199
Passing yards	103	194
Turnovers	0	3
Time of possession	28:47	31:13

Team	Category	Player	Statistics
South Florida	Passing	Byrum Brown	15/35, 103 yards
South Florida	Rushing	Byrum Brown	23 carries, 108 yards
South Florida	Receiving	Sean Atkins	4 receptions, 35 yards
Alabama	Passing	Jalen Milroe	16/26, 194 yards, 2 TD's
Alabama	Rushing	Jam Miller	15 carries, 140 yards, 1 TD
Alabama	Receiving	Ryan Williams	4 receptions, 68 yards, 1 TD

=== at Wisconsin ===
No. 4 Alabama Crimson Tide at Wisconsin Badgers – Game summary

Quarter	1	2	3	4	Total
No. 4 Crimson Tide	7	14	14	7	42
Badgers	3	0	7	0	10

at Camp Randall Stadium, Madison, WI

- Date: September 14
- Game time: 11:10 a.m.
- Game weather: 75°F, Cloudy, Wind SE @ 7 mph
- Game attendance: 76,323
- Referee: Ron Snodgrass
- TV announcers (FOX): Gus Johnson (play-by-play), Joel Klatt (analyst), and Jenny Taft (sideline)

Game information

First quarter

- WIS – Nathanial Vakos 53-yard field goal, 9:51. Wisconsin 3–0. Drive: 10 plays, 40 yards, 4:59.
- ALA – Ryan Coleman-Williams 31-yard pass from Jalen Milroe (Graham Nicholson kick), 0:20 Alabama 7–3 Drive: 4 plays, 60 yards, 1:23.

Second quarter

- ALA – Jalen Milroe 3-yard run (Graham Nicholson kick), 9:43 Alabama 14–3 Drive: 7 plays, 28 yards, 3:22.
- ALA – Germie Bernard 26-yard pass from Jalen Milroe (Graham Nicholson kick), 0:19 Alabama 21–3 Drive: 2 plays, 73 yards, 0:17.

Third quarter

- ALA – Jamarion Miller 34-yard run (Graham Nicholson kick), 12:40 Alabama 28–3 Drive: 5 plays, 75 yards, 2:20.
- WIS – Will Pauling 3-yard pass from Braedyn Locke (Nathanial Vakos kick), 4:26 Alabama 28–10 Drive: 17 plays, 75 yards, 8:14.
- ALA – Jalen Milroe 10-yard run (Graham Nicholson kick), 1:11 Alabama 35–10 Drive: 3 plays, 18 yards, 1:09.

Fourth quarter

- ALA – Josh Cuevas 37-yard pass from Jalen Milroe (Graham Nicholson kick), 10:05 Alabama 42–10 Drive: 1 play, 37 yards, 0:08.

Statistics	ALA	WIS
First downs	18	17
Total yards	407	290
Rushing yards	181	149
Passing yards	226	141
Turnovers	0	2
Time of possession	25:44	34:16

Team	Category	Player	Statistics
Alabama	Passing	Jalen Milroe	12/17, 196 yards, 3 TD's
Alabama	Rushing	Jalen Milroe	14 carries, 75 yards, 2 TD's
Alabama	Receiving	Ryan Williams	4 receptions, 78 yards, 1 TD
Wisconsin	Passing	Braedyn Locke	13/26, 125 yards, 1 TD
Wisconsin	Rushing	Chez Mellusi	11 carries, 66 yards
Wisconsin	Receiving	Will Pauling	9 receptions, 83 yards, 1 TD

=== No. 2 Georgia (rivalry) ===
No. 2 Georgia Bulldogs at No. 4 Alabama Crimson Tide – Game summary

Quarter	1	2	3	4	Total
No. 2 Bulldogs	0	7	8	19	34
No. 4 Crimson Tide	21	9	3	8	41

at Bryant–Denny Stadium, Tuscaloosa, AL

- Date: September 28
- Game time: 6:49 p.m.
- Game weather: 71°F, Cloudy, Wind E @ 6 mph
- Game attendance: 100,077
- Referee: Daniel Gautreaux
- TV announcers (ABC): Chris Fowler (play-by-play), Kirk Herbstreit (analyst), Holly Rowe and Laura Rutledge (sideline reporters)

Game information

First quarter

- (10:11) Alabama- Jalen Milroe 7-yard rush (Graham Nicholson kick) (Drive: 8 plays, 70 yards, 4:49; Alabama 7–0)
- (4:39) Jam Miller 16-yard pass from Jalen Milroe (Graham Nicholson kick) (Drive: 6 plays, 84 yards, 3:11; Alabama 14–0)
- (2:21) Alabama- Germie Bernard 7-yard rush (Graham Nicholson kick) (Drive: 3 plays, 22 yards, 1:25; Alabama 21–0)

Second quarter

- (12:32) Alabama- Jalen Milroe 36-yard rush (Graham Nicholson kick) (Drive: 6 plays, 67 yards, 3:20; Alabama 28–0)
- (6:43) Georgia- Trevor Etienne 7-yard rush (Peyton Woodring kick) (Drive: 11 plays, 75 yards, 5:49; Alabama 28–7)
- (1:39) Alabama - Team safety (Drive: 3 plays, -5 yards, 0:15; Alabama 30–7)

Third quarter

- (5:06) Georgia- Arian Smith 12-yard pass from Carson Beck (Carson Beck pass to Lawson Luckie) (Drive: 15 plays, 80 yards, 6:44; Alabama 30–15)
- (1:23) Alabama - Graham Nicholson 28-yard field goal (Drive: 7 plays, 69 yards, 3:43; Alabama 33–15)

Fourth quarter

- (9:55) Georgia - Lawson Luckie 8-yard pass from Carson Beck (Two-point conversion failed) (Drive: 6 plays, 80 yards, 2:35; Alabama 33–21)
- (5:39) Georgia- Dillon Bell 3-yard rush (Peyton Woodring kick) (Drive: 4 plays, 78 yards, 1:35; Alabama 33–28)
- (2:31) Georgia - Dillon Bell 67-yard pass from Carson Beck (Two-point conversion failed) (Drive: 1 play, 67 yards, 0:52; Georgia 34–33)
- (2:18) Alabama - Ryan Coleman-Williams 75-yard pass from Jalen Milroe (Jalen Milroe pass to Germie Bernard) (Drive: 1 play, 75 yards, 0:13; Alabama 41–34)

Statistics	UGA	ALA
First downs	27	21
Total yards	519	549
Rushing yards	80	175
Passing yards	439	374
Turnovers	4	1
Time of possession	27:47	32:53

Team	Category	Player	Statistics
Georgia	Passing	Carson Beck	27/50, 439 yards, 3 TDs, 3 INTs
Georgia	Rushing	Trevor Etienne	12 carries, 55 yards, 1 TD
Georgia	Receiving	Arian Smith	6 receptions, 132 yards, 2 TDs
Alabama	Passing	Jalen Milroe	27/33, 374 yards, 2 TDs, 1 INT
Alabama	Rushing	Jalen Milroe	16 carries, 117 yards, 2 TD's
Alabama	Receiving	Ryan Williams	6 receptions, 177 yards, 1 TD

=== at Vanderbilt ===
No. 1 Alabama Crimson Tide at Vanderbilt Commodores – Game summary

Quarter	1	2	3	4	Total
No. 1 Crimson Tide	7	7	14	7	35
Commodores	13	10	7	10	40

at FirstBank Stadium, Nashville, TN

- Date: October 5
- Game time: 3:20 p.m.
- Game weather: 85°F, Sunny, Wind E @ 4 mph
- Game attendance: 28,934
- Referee: Lee Hedrick
- TV announcers (SEC Network): Tom Hart (play-by-play), Cole Cubelic (analyst), and Alyssa Lang (sideline)

Game information
First quarter
- VAN – Sedrick Alexander 7-yard run (Brock Taylor kick), 8:46. Commodores 7–0. Drive: 10 plays, 75 yards, 6:14.
- VAN – Randon Fontenette 29-yard interception return (kick failed), 8:03. Commodores 13–0.
- ALA – Jam Miller 8-yard run (Graham Nicholson kick), 4:22. Commodores 13–7. Drive: 7 plays, 75 yards, 3:41.

Second quarter

- VAN – Sedrick Alexander 1-yard run (Brock Taylor kick), 9:32. Commodores 20–7. Drive: 17 plays, 75 yards, 9:50.
- VAN – Brock Taylor 51-yard field goal, 4:10. Commodores 23–7. Drive: 8 plays, 26 yards, 4:02.
- ALA – Jam Miller 3-yard run (Graham Nicholson kick), 1:25. Commodores 23–14. Drive: 9 plays, 83 yards, 2:41.

Third quarter

- ALA – Jalen Milroe 14-yard run (Graham Nicholson kick), 12:01. Commodores 23–21. Drive: 5 plays, 53 yards, 2:51.
- VAN – Junior Sherrill 36-yard pass from Diego Pavia (Brock Taylor kick), 2:53. Commodores 30–21. Drive: 4 plays, 45 yards, 2:13.
- ALA – Ryan Coleman-Williams 58-yard pass from Jalen Milroe (Graham Nicholson kick), 1:01. Commodores 30–28. Drive: 4 plays, 75 yards, 1:52.

Fourth quarter

- VAN – Brock Taylor 33-yard field goal, 10:35. Commodores 33–28. Drive: 9 plays, 60 yards, 5:26.
- VAN – Kamrean Johnson 6-yard pass from Diego Pavia (Brock Taylor kick), 5:07. Commodores 40–28. Drive: 7 plays, 53 yards, 4:29.
- ALA – Ryan Coleman-Williams 2-yard run (Graham Nicholson kick), 2:46. Commodores 40–35. Drive: 8 plays, 75 yards, 2:21.

Statistics	ALA	VAN
First downs	17	26
Total yards	394	418
Rushing yards	84	166
Passing yards	310	252
Turnovers	2	0
Time of possession	17:52	42:08

Team	Category	Player	Statistics
Alabama	Passing	Jalen Milroe	18/24, 310 yards, 1 TD, 1 INT
Alabama	Rushing	Jam Miller	5 carries, 45 yards, 2 TD's
Alabama	Receiving	Ryan Williams	3 receptions, 82 yards, 1 TD
Vanderbilt	Passing	Diego Pavia	16/20, 252 yards, 2 TD's
Vanderbilt	Rushing	Sedrick Alexander	21 carries, 64 yards, 2 TD's
Vanderbilt	Receiving	Eli Stowers	6 receptions, 113 yards

=== South Carolina ===
South Carolina Gamecocks at No. 7 Alabama Crimson Tide – Game summary

Quarter	1	2	3	4	Total
Gamecocks	0	12	7	6	25
No. 7 Crimson Tide	7	7	0	13	27

at Bryant–Denny Stadium, Tuscaloosa, AL

- Date: October 12
- Game time: 11:07 a.m.
- Game weather: 73°F, Sunny, Wind N @ 1 mph
- Game attendance: 100,077
- Referee: Matt Loeffler
- TV announcers (ABC): Joe Tessitore (play-by-play), Jesse Palmer (analyst), and Katie George (sideline)

Game information

First quarter

- (11:00) ALA – Jalen Milroe 1-yard run, Graham Nicholson kick (Drive: 9 plays, 75 yards, 4:00; Alabama 7–0)

Second quarter

- (4:38) ALA – Justice Haynes 2-yard run, Graham Nicholson kick (Drive: 7 plays, 67 yards, 3:32; Alabama 14–0)
- (1:37) SCAR – Mazeo Bennett Jr. 36-yard pass from LaNorris Sellers, Alex Herrera kick (Drive: 10 plays, 75 yards, 3:01; Alabama 14–7)
- (1:28) SCAR – Team Safety (Alabama 14–9)
- (0:00) SCAR – Alex Herrera 37-yard field goal (Drive: 1 play, 0 yards, 0:01; Alabama 14–12)

Third quarter

- (6:20) SCAR – Raheim Sanders 1-yard run, Alex Herrera kick (Drive: 16 plays, 85 yards, 8:40; South Carolina 19–14)

Fourth quarter

- (10:42) ALA – Jalen Milroe 7-yard run, 2-PT failed (Drive: 3 plays, 31 yards, 1:23; Alabama 20–19)
- (1:54) ALA – Germie Bernard 34-yard pass from Jalen Milroe, Graham Nicholson kick (Drive: 10 plays, 67 yards, 4:14; Alabama 27–19)
- (0:43) SCAR – Nyck Harbor 31-yard pass from LaNorris Sellers, 2-PT failed (Drive: 6 plays, 75 yards, 1:11; Alabama 27–25)

Statistics	SCAR	ALA
First downs	23	20
Total yards	374	313
Rushing yards	132	104
Passing yards	242	209
Turnovers	4	2
Time of possession	31:40	28:20

Team	Category	Player	Statistics
South Carolina	Passing	LaNorris Sellers	23/31, 238 yards, 2 TD's, 1 INT
South Carolina	Rushing	Raheim Sanders	16 carries, 78 yards, 1 TD
South Carolina	Receiving	Mazeo Bennett Jr.	3 receptions, 57 yards, 1 TD
Alabama	Passing	Jalen Milroe	16/23, 209 yards, 1 TD, 2 INT's
Alabama	Rushing	Jam Miller	12 carries, 42 yards
Alabama	Receiving	Germie Bernard	4 receptions, 89 yards, 1 TD

=== at No. 11 Tennessee (Third Saturday in October) ===
No. 7 Alabama Crimson Tide at No. 11 Tennessee Volunteers – Game summary

Quarter	1	2	3	4	Total
No. 7 Crimson Tide	0	7	3	7	17
No. 11 Volunteers	0	0	14	10	24

at Neyland Stadium, Knoxville, TN

- Date: October 19
- Game time: 3:50 p.m.
- Game weather: 72°F, Sunny, Wind SE @ 5 mph
- Game attendance: 101,915
- Referee: Ken Williamson
- TV announcers (ABC): Sean McDonough (play-by-play), Greg McElroy (analyst), and Molly McGrath (sideline)

Statistics	ALA	TENN
First downs	23	21
Total yards	314	408
Rushing yards	75	214
Passing yards	239	194
Turnovers	2	3
Time of possession	33:15	26:45

Team	Category	Player	Statistics
Alabama	Passing	Jalen Milroe	25/45, 239 yards, 1 TD, 2 INT's
Alabama	Rushing	Jam Miller	12 carries, 42 yards
Alabama	Receiving	Ryan Williams	8 receptions, 73 yards, 1 TD
Tennessee	Passing	Nico Iamaleava	14/27, 194 yards, 1 TD, 1 INT
Tennessee	Rushing	Dylan Sampson	26 carries, 139 yards, 2 TD's
Tennessee	Receiving	Bru McCoy	6 receptions, 80 yards

=== No. 21 Missouri ===
No. 21 Missouri Tigers at No. 15 Alabama Crimson Tide – Game summary

Quarter	1	2	3	4	Total
No. 21 Tigers	0	0	0	0	0
No. 15 Crimson Tide	3	10	14	7	34

at Bryant–Denny Stadium, Tuscaloosa, AL

- Date: October 26
- Game time: 2:45 p.m.
- Game weather: 85°F, Sunny, Wind E @ 5 mph
- Game attendance: 100,077
- Referee: Jeff Heaser
- TV announcers (ABC): Joe Tessitore (play-by-play), Jordan Rodgers (analyst), and Katie George (sideline)

Statistics	MIZZ	ALA
First downs	15	22
Total yards	239	486
Rushing yards	167	271
Passing yards	72	215
Turnovers	3	0
Time of possession	30:01	29:44

Team	Category	Player	Statistics
Missouri	Passing	Drew Pyne	6/12, 42 yards, 3 INT's
Missouri	Rushing	Marcus Carroll	17 carries, 80 yards
Missouri	Receiving	Brett Norfleet	3 receptions, 23 yards
Alabama	Passing	Jalen Milroe	16/26, 215 yards
Alabama	Rushing	Justice Haynes	8 carries, 79 yards, 1 TD
Alabama	Receiving	Germie Bernard	5 receptions, 82 yards

=== at No. 15 LSU (rivalry) ===
No. 11 Alabama Crimson Tide at No. 15 LSU Tigers – Game summary

Quarter	1	2	3	4	Total
No. 11 Crimson Tide	14	7	7	14	42
No. 15 Tigers	3	3	0	7	13

at Tiger Stadium, Baton Rouge, LA

- Date: November 9
- Game time: 6:30 p.m.
- Game attendance: 102,283
- Referee: Ken Williamson
- TV announcers (ABC): Chris Fowler (play-by-play), Kirk Herbstreit (analyst), and Holly Rowe (sideline)

Statistics	ALA	LSU
First downs	23	22
Total yards	420	343
Rushing yards	311	104
Passing yards	109	239
Turnovers	0	3
Time of possession	33:55	26:05

Team	Category	Player	Statistics
Alabama	Passing	Jalen Milroe	12/18, 109 yards
Alabama	Rushing	Jalen Milroe	12 carries, 185 yards, 4 TD's
Alabama	Receiving	Jam Miller	5 receptions, 50 yards
LSU	Passing	Garrett Nussmeier	27/42, 239 yards, 1 TD, 2 INT's
LSU	Rushing	Caden Durham	8 carries, 63 yards
LSU	Receiving	Kyren Lacy	5 receptions, 79 yards, 1 TD

=== No. 7 (FCS) Mercer ===
No. 7 (FCS) Mercer Bears at No. 10 Alabama Crimson Tide – Game summary

Quarter	1	2	3	4	Total
No. 7 (FCS) Bears	0	7	0	0	7
No. 10 Crimson Tide	14	17	7	14	52

at Bryant–Denny Stadium, Tuscaloosa, AL

- Date: November 16
- Game time: 1:02 p.m.
- Game weather: 68°F, Sunny, Wind NW @ 2 mph
- Game attendance: 100,077
- Referee: Jason Autrey
- TV announcers (SECN+/ESPN+): Jay Alter (play-by-play), Rocky Boiman (color), Ashley Stroehlein (sideline)

Statistics	MER	ALA
First downs	10	29
Total yards	202	508
Rushing yards	62	189
Passing yards	140	319
Turnovers	3	0
Time of possession	26:12	33:48

Team	Category	Player	Statistics
Mercer	Passing	Whitt Newbauer	15/22, 140 yards, 1 TD, 1 INT
Mercer	Rushing	CJ Miller	8 carries, 44 yards
Mercer	Receiving	Kelin Parsons	6 receptions, 39 yards
Alabama	Passing	Jalen Milroe	11/16, 186 yards, 2 TD's
Alabama	Rushing	Jalen Milroe	6 carries, 43 yards, 1 TD
Alabama	Receiving	Germie Bernard	4 receptions, 81 yards

=== at Oklahoma ===
No. 8 Alabama Crimson Tide at Oklahoma Sooners – Game summary

Quarter	1	2	3	4	Total
No. 7 Crimson Tide	3	0	0	0	3
Sooners	0	10	14	0	24

at Gaylord Family Oklahoma Memorial Stadium, Norman, OK

- Date: November 23
- Game time: 6:44 p.m.
- Game weather: 62°F, Sunny, Wind SE @ 15 mph
- Game attendance: 84,053
- Referee: Wayne Winkler
- TV announcers (ABC): Chris Fowler (play-by-play), Kirk Herbstreit (color), Holly Rowe (sideline)

Statistics	ALA	OU
First downs	13	18
Total yards	234	325
Rushing yards	70	257
Passing yards	164	68
Turnovers	3	1
Time of possession	25:49	34:11

Team	Category	Player	Statistics
Alabama	Passing	Jalen Milroe	11/26, 164 yards, 3 INT’s
Alabama	Rushing	Jam Miller	12 carries, 45 yards
Alabama	Receiving	Germie Bernard	4 receptions, 60 yards
Oklahoma	Passing	Jackson Arnold	9/11, 68 yards
Oklahoma	Rushing	Jackson Arnold	25 carries, 131 yards
Oklahoma	Receiving	Bauer Sharp	2 receptions, 21 yards

=== Auburn (Iron Bowl) ===
Auburn Tigers at No. 13 Alabama Crimson Tide – Game summary

Quarter	1	2	3	4	Total
Tigers	0	6	8	0	14
No. 13 Crimson Tide	7	7	14	0	28

at Bryant–Denny Stadium, Tuscaloosa, AL

- Date: November 30
- Game time: 2:51 p.m.
- Game weather: 52°F, Sunny, Wind S @ 1 mph
- Game attendance: 100,077
- Referee: Daniel Gautreaux
- TV announcers (ABC): Sean McDonough (play-by-play), Greg McElroy (color), Molly McGrath (sideline)

Statistics	AUB	ALA
First downs	24	25
Total yards	399	457
Rushing yards	98	201
Passing yards	301	256
Turnovers	2	4
Time of possession	23:25	36:35

Team	Category	Player	Statistics
Auburn	Passing	Payton Thorne	24/41, 301 yards, 1 TD, 1 INT
Auburn	Rushing	Jarquez Hunter	13 carries, 56 yards
Auburn	Receiving	KeAndre Lambert-Smith	8 receptions, 116 yards
Alabama	Passing	Jalen Milroe	18/24, 256 yards, 1 INT
Alabama	Rushing	Jalen Milroe	17 carries, 104 yards, 3 TD’s
Alabama	Receiving	Germie Bernard	7 receptions, 111 yards

=== vs. Michigan ===
2024 ReliaQuest Bowl
No. 11 Alabama Crimson Tide vs Michigan Wolverines – Game summary

Quarter	1	2	3	4	Total
No. 11 Crimson Tide	0	10	0	3	13
Wolverines	16	0	0	3	19

at Raymond James Stadium • Tampa, Florida

- Date: Tuesday, December 31, 2024
- Game time: 11:00 a.m. CST
- Game weather: Cloudy • Temperature: 76 °F (24 °C) • Wind: NE at 10 miles per hour (16 km/h)
- Game attendance: 51,439
- Referee: Tutashina Salaam
- TV announcers (ESPN): Dave Flemming (play-by-play), Brock Osweiler (analyst), and Stormy Buonantony (sideline)

Game information

First quarter

- (8:15) MICH – Dominic Zvada 45-yard field goal (Drive: 7 plays, 17 yards, 4:01; Michigan 3–0)
- (5:52) MICH – Dominic Zvada 30-yard field goal (Drive: 4 plays, 7 yards, 2:18; Michigan 6–0)
- (4:15) MICH – Fredrick Moore 13-yard pass from Davis Warren, Dominic Zvada kick (Drive: 3 plays, 16 yards, 0:48; Michigan 13–0)
- (2:04) MICH – Dominic Zvada 21-yard field goal (Drive: 4 plays, 3 yards, 2:04; Michigan 16–0)

Second quarter

- (4:06) ALA – Robbie Ouzts 25-yard pass from Jalen Milroe (Drive: 4 plays, 71 yards, 1:50; Michigan 16–7)
- (0:04) ALA – Graham Nicholson 24-yard field goal (Drive: 8 plays, 90 yards, 0:55; Michigan 16–10)

Third quarter

- No scoring plays

Fourth quarter

- (7:21) MICH – Dominic Zvada 37-yard field goal (Drive: 9 plays, 47 yards, 5:17; Michigan 19–10)
- (4:38) ALA – Graham Nicholson 51-yard field goal (Drive: 8 plays, 42 yards, 2:43; Michigan 19–13)

Statistics	ALA	MICH
First downs	15	13
Total yards	260	190
Rushing yards	68	115
Passing yards	192	75
Turnovers	5	4
Time of possession	21:48	38:12

Team	Category	Player	Statistics
Alabama	Passing	Jalen Milroe	16/32, 192 yards, 1 TD, 1 INT
Alabama	Rushing	Rico Scott	1 carry, 28 yards
Alabama	Receiving	Germie Bernard	4 receptions, 80 yards
Michigan	Passing	Davis Warren	9/12, 73 yards, 1 TD
Michigan	Rushing	Jordan Marshall	23 carries, 100 yards
Michigan	Receiving	Fredrick Moore	3 receptions, 37 yards, 1 TD

== Rankings ==
Ranking movements Legend: ██ Increase in ranking ██ Decrease in ranking ( ) = First-place votes
	Week																
Poll	Pre	1	2	3	4	5	6	7	8	9	10	11	12	13	14	15	Final
AP	5	4	4	4	4	1 (40)	7	7	15	14	11	9	7	13	11	11	17
Coaches	5	4	4	4	4	2 (19)	7	7	15	14	11	9	7	13	11	11	17
CFP	Not released										11	10	7	13	11	11	Not released

== Statistics ==
=== Scoring ===
==== Alabama vs. non-conference opponents ====
	1	2	3	4	Total
Alabama	49	59	35	56	199
Opponents	6	10	14	3	33

==== Alabama vs. SEC opponents ====
	1	2	3	4	Total
Alabama	62	54	55	56	227
SEC opponents	27	52	44	52	175

==== Alabama vs. all opponents ====
	1	2	3	4	Total
Alabama	111	113	90	112	426
Opponents	22	58	72	56	208

== Awards and honors ==
SEC Weekly Honors
Date	Player	Class	Position	Award	Ref.
Sept. 2	Ryan Williams	Fr.	WR	SEC Freshman Player of the Week	
Sept. 2	Keon Sabb	Jr.	DB	SEC Defensive Player of the Week	
Sept. 9	Tim Keenan III	R-Jr.	DL	SEC Defensive Lineman Player of the Week	
Sept 16/30	Jalen Milroe (2)	R-Jr.	QB	SEC Offensive Player of the Week	
Sept 30	Jalen Milroe (2)	R-Jr.	QB	SEC Offensive Player of the Week	
Sept 30	Ryan Williams (2)	Fr.	WR	SEC Freshman Player of the Week	

National Weekly Honors
Date	Player	Class	Position	Award
September 3	Keon Sabb	Jr.	DB	Reese's Senior Bowl Defensive Player of the Week

=== All-SEC ===
All-SEC
Player	Position	1st/2nd team
HM = Honorable mention. Source:
