= 2024 ReliaQuest Bowl (December) =

Postseason college football bowl game

- 39th ReliaQuest Bowl
Alabama Crimson Tide	Michigan Wolverines
(9–3)	(7–5)
SEC	Big Ten
13	19
Head coach: Kalen DeBoer	Head coach: Sherrone Moore
AP / Coaches / CFP; 11 / 11 / 11
	1	2	3	4	Total
Alabama	0	10	0	3	13
Michigan	16	0	0	3	19
- Date: December 31, 2024
- Season: 2024
- Stadium: Raymond James Stadium
- Location: Tampa, Florida
- MVP: Jordan Marshall (RB, Michigan)
- Favorite: Alabama by 16.5
- Referee: Tuta Salaam (Big 12)
- Attendance: 51,439

United States TV coverage
- Network: ESPN; ESPN Radio
- Announcers: Dave Flemming (play-by-play), Brock Osweiler (analyst), and Sherree Burruss (sideline) (ESPN); Chris Carlin (play-by-play), Aaron Murray (analyst), and Mike Peasley (sideline) (ESPN Radio)

The 2024 ReliaQuest Bowl was a college football bowl game played on December 31, 2024, at Raymond James Stadium in Tampa, Florida. The 39th annual ReliaQuest Bowl (previously played as the Outback Bowl from 1996 to 2022) featured the Alabama Crimson Tide of the Southeastern Conference (SEC), and the Michigan Wolverines of the Big Ten Conference; a rematch of the previous season's 2024 Rose Bowl (CFP semifinal). The game began at approximately 12:00 p.m. EST and aired on ESPN. It was one of the 2024–25 bowl games concluding the 2024 FBS football season. The game's title sponsor was the ReliaQuest cybersecurity company.

== Teams ==
The game featured the (7–5) Michigan Wolverines of the Big Ten Conference, versus the (9–3) Alabama Crimson Tide of the Southeastern Conference (SEC). The bowl game was a rematch of the previous season's 2024 Rose Bowl (CFP semifinal), where the Michigan Wolverines won 27–20 in overtime. In the 2024 CFP National Championship Game, Michigan defeated Alabama's head coach Kalen DeBoer at his previous post with the Washington Huskies. Both DeBoer and Michigan's Sherrone Moore were in their first season as head coach with each program. It was the seventh all-time meeting between the Crimson Tide and Wolverines, with the series tied 3–3 entering the game. Michigan made its seventh appearance in the ReliaQuest Bowl (previously played as the Outback Bowl and Hall of Fame Bowl), and Alabama made its third.

=== Michigan Wolverines ===
On December 3, Kirk Campbell was fired by Michigan as offensive coordinator, and tight ends coach Steve Casula replaced him as the interim offensive coordinator for the ReliaQuest Bowl. In the following weeks, All-American juniors Mason Graham, Will Johnson, Kenneth Grant, and Colston Loveland, each declared for the 2025 NFL draft, opting to sit out the bowl game as projected first-round picks. They were joined as opt-outs by Donovan Edwards, Kalel Mullings, Josaiah Stewart, Makari Paige, Tyler Morris and Myles Hinton. With the opt-outs and the graduating class in 2023, Michigan returned zero starters on offense or defense from the two teams previous meeting in the 2024 Rose Bowl.

=== Alabama Crimson Tide ===
The Crimson Tide were the first team left out in the inaugural 12 team 2024–25 College Football Playoff (CFP), despite being the No. 11 ranked team in the country. Alabama was not selected into the playoff as both the automatic qualifying Atlantic Coast Conference (ACC) and Big 12 Conference champions were ranked lower, pushing Alabama to No. 13 in the seeding. All-SEC defensive back Malachi Moore did not play in the bowl game with an injury.

== Game summary ==
2024 ReliaQuest Bowl

Quarter	1	2	3	4	Total
No. 11 Alabama	0	10	0	3	13
Michigan	16	0	0	3	19

at Raymond James Stadium • Tampa, Florida

- Date: Tuesday, December 31, 2024
- Game time: 12:05 p.m. EST
- Game weather: Cloudy • Temperature: 76 °F (24 °C) • Wind: 10 mph (16 km/h) northeast
- Game attendance: 51,439
- Referee: Tuta Salaam
- TV announcers (ESPN): Dave Flemming (play-by-play), Brock Osweiler (analyst), and Sherree Burruss (sideline)
- Box score

Scoring summary

Quarter	Time	Drive			Team	Scoring information	Score	
Quarter	Time	Plays	Yards	TOP	Team	Scoring information	ALA	MICH
1	8:15	7	17	4:01	MICH	45-yard field goal by Dominic Zvada	0	3
1	5:52	4	7	2:18	MICH	30-yard field goal by Dominic Zvada	0	6
1	4:15	3	16	0:48	MICH	Fredrick Moore 13-yard touchdown reception from Davis Warren, Dominic Zvada kick good	0	13
1	2:04	4	3	2:04	MICH	21-yard field goal by Dominic Zvada	0	16
2	4:06	4	71	0:50	ALA	Robbie Ouzts 25-yard touchdown reception from Jalen Milroe, Graham Nicholson kick good	7	16
2	0:04	8	90	0:54	ALA	24-yard field goal by Graham Nicholson	10	16
4	7:21	9	47	5:17	MICH	37-yard field goal by Dominic Zvada	10	19
4	4:38	8	42	2:43	ALA	51-yard field goal by Graham Nicholson	13	19
"TOP" = time of possession. For other American football terms, see Glossary of American football.							13	19

=== Statistics ===
Statistics	ALA	MICH
First downs	15	13
Plays–yards	62–260	66–190
Rushes–yards	29–68	51–115
Passing yards	192	75
Passing: comp–att–int	16–33–1	11–15–1
Turnovers		
Time of possession	21:48	38:12

Team	Category	Player	Statistics
Alabama	Passing	Jalen Milroe	16/32, 192 yards, TD, INT
Alabama	Rushing	Rico Scott	1 carry, 28 yards
Alabama	Receiving	Germie Bernard	4 receptions, 80 yards
Michigan	Passing	Davis Warren	9/12, 73 yards, TD
Michigan	Rushing	Jordan Marshall	23 carries, 100 yards
Michigan	Receiving	Fredrick Moore	3 receptions, 37 yards, TD

== See also ==
- 2024 Gasparilla Bowl, contested at the same venue 11 days earlier
