= Steve Casula =

American football coach and former player

Current position
- Title: Offensive analyst / assistant tight ends
- Team: Texas
- Conference: SEC

Biographical details
- Born: September 7, 1987 (age 39); Wilmington, Delaware, U.S
- Education: Delaware (2009); Western Michigan (2011)

Coaching career (HC unless noted)
- 2006: Delcastle Tech HS (DE) (assistant)
- 2007: Kennett HS (PA) (assistant)
- 2008–2009: Delaware (SA)
- 2010–2011: Western Michigan (GA)
- 2012: Western Michigan (TE/FB)
- 2013: Colgate (TE/FB)
- 2014–2016: Davenport (OC)
- 2017–2018: Ferris State (OC/TE/FB)
- 2019–2021: Michigan (analyst)
- 2022–2023: UMass (OC/QB)
- 2024: Michigan (interim OC/TE)
- 2025: Michigan (co-OC/TE)
- 2026–present: Texas (analyst/asst. TE)

Steven Casula (born September 7, 1987) is an American college football coach, currently an offensive analyst for the Texas Longhorns. He was previously the co-offensive coordinator and tight ends coach for the University of Michigan in 2025. Casula was rehired by Michigan in 2024, previously coaching for the Wolverines as an offensive analyst from 2019 to 2021. He departed to become the offensive coordinator for UMass in 2022 and 2023.

== Coaching career ==
=== Student coach ===
During Casula's undergraduate studies, he began his coaching career. He spent 2006 as an assistant coach at Delcastle Technical High School in New Castle County, Delaware. In 2007, Casula helped the newly reinstated program at Kennett High School in Kennett Square, Pennsylvania. During his junior and senior years, he worked as a student assistant coach under K. C. Keeler at Delaware. He worked primarily with the offensive line.

=== Western Michigan ===
In 2010, Casula joined Bill Cubit’s staff at Western Michigan as a graduate assistant. He worked with the offensive line for two seasons as a graduate assistant, before being promoted to tight ends and fullbacks coach for the 2012 season. He also served as the walk-on coordinator and academic coordinator. In Casula's lone season coaching the tight ends, the position improved from 17 receptions the previous year, to 46 receptions in 2012, despite five different players starting at the position.

=== Colgate ===
Casula spent the 2013 season on coach Dick Biddle's final staff at Colgate. He coached the tight ends and H-backs for the Raiders.

=== Davenport ===
Casula was the first assistant coach hired in the history of Davenport Panthers football. Hired ahead of the 2014 season, he helped build the upstart NAIA football program from the ground up as the offensive coordinator. In 2016, the first season that Davenport played, Casula's offense helped pave the way for a winning inaugural season as the Panthers finished with a 6–5 record. Following the season, he was named the interim head coach. When he was not hired as the head coach, he departed.

=== Ferris State ===
In 2017 and 2018, Casula served as the offensive coordinator at NCAA Division II power Ferris State. In his first season on staff, he helped lead the Bulldogs to the fourth straight play-off appearance and an 11–2 record. In his second season, he helped guide Ferris State to a National Title appearance, eventually falling 49–47 to Valdosta State.

=== Michigan ===
In March 2019, Casula was hired as an offensive analyst by Jim Harbaugh and the Michigan Wolverines. While there, he worked closely with offensive coordinator Josh Gattis, and earned a promotion to senior offensive analyst ahead of the 2020 season. In 2021, Casula helped the Wolverines reach the College Football Playoff.

=== UMass ===
In December 2021, Casula was hired by Don Brown, the new head coach at UMass as the offensive coordinator and quarterbacks coach. This reunited the pair, after previously working together at Michigan from 2019 to 2020, where Brown was the defensive coordinator.

=== Michigan (second stint) ===
On February 5, 2024, Casula was hired back at the University of Michigan, this time by Sherrone Moore as the tight ends coach. On December 3, Kirk Campbell was fired by Michigan as offensive coordinator and Casula replaced him as the interim OC for the 2024 ReliaQuest Bowl win over Alabama. Chip Lindsey assumed the offensive coordinator duties following the bowl. In May 2025, Casula was promoted to co-offensive coordinator, while retaining his role as the tight ends coach. In December 2025, Sherrone Moore was fired and Chip Lindsey left the program as a result. For a second straight season, Casula was promoted to interim offensive coordinator and in charge of play calling duties, this time for the 2025 Citrus Bowl.

=== Texas ===
In February 2026, Casula joined the Texas Longhorns as an offensive analyst and assistant tight ends coach under Steve Sarkisian.

== Personal life ==
Casula earned all-state honors as a senior at Salesianum School in Wilmington, Delaware. He and his wife Stephanie have three children, Audrey, Paulie, and Tommy.
