= Fredrick Moore =

American football player (born 2005)

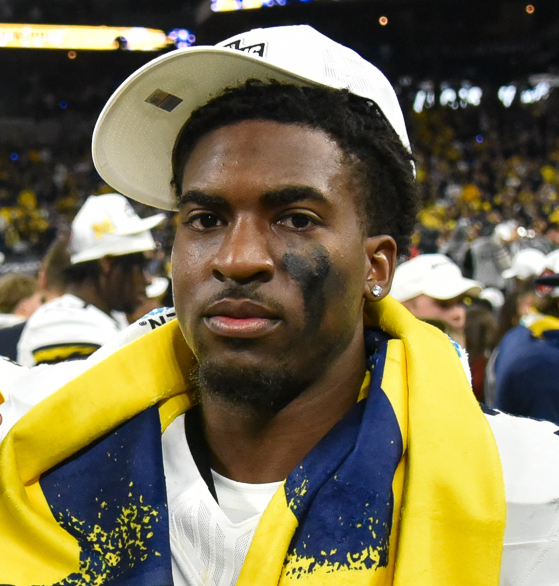
- Moore with the Michigan Wolverines in 2023

Michigan State Spartans
- Position: Wide receiver
- Class: Senior

Personal information
- Born: February 24, 2005 (age 21)
- Listed height: 6 ft 1 in (1.85 m)
- Listed weight: 181 lb (82 kg)

Career information
- High school: Cardinal Ritter (St. Louis, Missouri)
- College: Michigan (2023–2025); Michigan State (2026–present)

Awards and highlights
- CFP national champion (2023)
- Stats at ESPN

Fredrick Moore (born February 24, 2005) is an American college football wide receiver for the Michigan State Spartans. He previously played for the Michigan Wolverines, where he won a national championship in 2023.

== Early life ==
Moore was born on February 24, 2005, the son of Willie Davidson and Elizabeth Moore. He attended Cardinal Ritter College Prep High School in St. Louis, Missouri, playing both wide receiver and cornerback. As a junior, he recorded 41 receptions for 1,010 yards and 12 touchdowns. As a senior, he recorded 67 receptions for 1,504 yards and 24 touchdowns, and was an All-State selection and the Offensive Player of the Year. In the Missouri Class 3A State championship game, he had eight receptions for 157 yards and two touchdowns, also recording an interception, helping the Lions win their first state championship in school history. Moore was rated as a three-star recruit and ranked the No. 11 player in the state of Missouri by 247Sports and a four-star recruit and the No. 12 player in the state by Rivals.com.

== College career ==
On July 1, 2022, Moore committed to play college football at the University of Michigan. As a freshman in 2023, he appeared in 13 games and had four receptions for 32 yards and helped Michigan win the national championship. As a sophomore in 2024, he appeared in 13 games and had 11 receptions for 128 yards and one touchdown. On December 31, 2024, during the 2024 ReliaQuest Bowl against Alabama, he had his first career touchdown, a 13-yard reception from Davis Warren.

In 2025, Moore saw limited playing time as a junior and left the team midseason at the start of October. He did not have a reception during the season, but played in four games on special teams.
