= Colin Hitschler =

American football coach (born 1986)

Current position
- Title: Defensive coordinator
- Team: UCLA
- Conference: Big Ten

Biographical details
- Born: March 13, 1986 (age 40)
- Education: University of Pennsylvania (2010)

Coaching career (HC unless noted)
- 2009: Philadelphia Eagles (TCA)
- 2010: Kansas City Chiefs (PPA)
- 2011: Salve Regina (co-STC/DL)
- 2012: Widener (STC/DB)
- 2013: Arkansas State (GA)
- 2014: South Alabama (GA)
- 2015–2016: South Alabama (FBO)
- 2017: South Alabama (S)
- 2018: Cincinnati (QC/D)
- 2019: Cincinnati (SDA)
- 2020–2021: Cincinnati (S)
- 2022: Cincinnati (co-DC/S)
- 2023: Wisconsin (co-DC/S)
- 2024: Alabama (co-DC/S)
- 2025: James Madison (DC)
- 2026–present: UCLA (DC)

Colin Hitschler (born March 13, 1986) is an American football coach who serves as the defensive coordinator for UCLA. He was most recently the defensive coordinator for James Madison University, prior to which he served as co-defensive coordinator and safeties coach for the University of Alabama. Earlier, he served in the same roles for Cincinnati and Wisconsin.

== Coaching career ==
Hitschler started his coaching career in 2009 as a training camp assistant for the Philadelphia Eagles.

In 2010, he was hired by the Kansas City Chiefs as a player personal assistant.

In 2011, Hitschler was hired to be the co-special teams coordinator and defensive line coach at Salve Regina.

In 2012, he joined Widener as the team's special team coordinator and defensive back coach.

In 2013, Hitschler was hired by Arkansas State as a graduate assistant.

In 2014, Hitschler was hired by the South Alabama Jaguars as a graduate assistant. In 2015, Hitschler was promoted by South Alabama as the director of football operations. Two years later in 2017, the Jaguars promoted Hitschler to be the safeties coach.

In 2018, Hitschler was hired by Cincinnati as a defensive quality control coach. In 2019, Hitschler was promoted to be a senior defensive analyst. In 2020, Hitschler was promoted to coach the Bearcats safeties. In 2022, Hitschler was promoted to be Cincinnati's co-defensive coordinator and safeties coach.

January 1, 2023, Hitschler joined the Wisconsin Badgers as the team's co-defensive coordinator and safeties coach.

January 18, 2024, Hitschler was hired by the Alabama Crimson Tide to be the team's co-defensive coordinator and defensive backs coach.

January 3, 2025, Hitschler was fired from Alabama.

February 7, 2025, Hitschler became the new defensive coordinator for the James Madison Dukes.
