= Red Morgan (American football) =

American football player (born 2006)

No. 6 – Alabama Crimson Tide
- Position: Defensive back
- Class: Junior

Personal information
- Born: April 18, 2006 (age 20)
- Listed height: 6 ft 0 in (1.83 m)
- Listed weight: 189 lb (86 kg)

Career information
- High school: Central (Phenix City, Alabama)
- College: Alabama (2024–present)
- Stats at ESPN

Rydarrius "Red" Morgan (born April 18, 2006) is an American football defensive back for the Alabama Crimson Tide.

== Early life ==
Morgan attended Central High School in Phenix City, Alabama. He was rated as a three-star recruit and the 564th overall prospect in the class of 2024, and committed to play college football for the Florida State Seminoles over offers from schools such as Alabama, Auburn, Cincinnati, Miami, and Mississippi State. However, Morgan later flipped his commitment to sign with the Alabama Crimson Tide.

== College career ==
As a freshman in 2024, Morgan appeared in 12 games, notching eight tackles with one being for a loss, and a pass deflection. During the 2025 season, he played in all 15 games with five starts, totaling 26 tackles with three going for a loss, a pass deflection, and a forced fumble. Morgan returned to the Crimson Tide in 2026, in line to be a full-time starter in the Alabama secondary.
