= Justice Haynes =

American football player (born 2004)

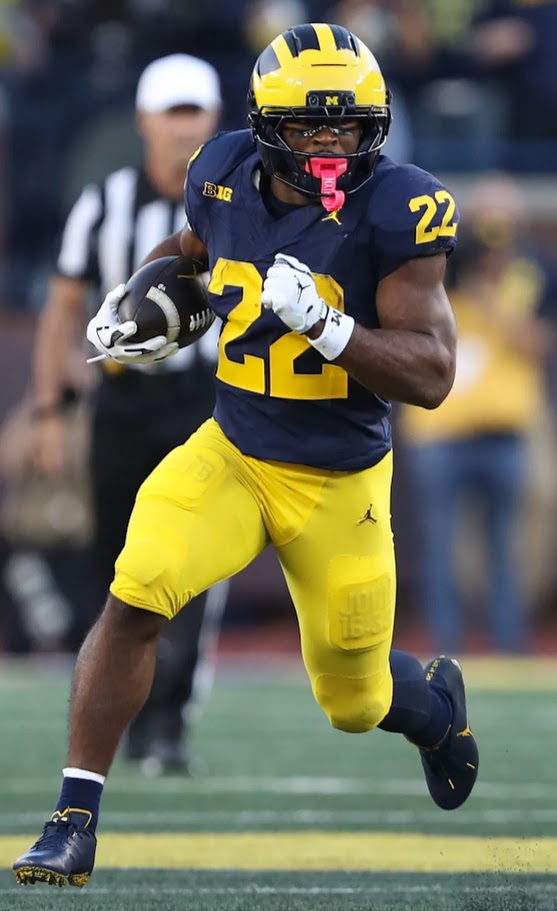
- Haynes with the Michigan Wolverines in 2025

No. 22 – Georgia Tech Yellow Jackets
- Position: Running back
- Class: Senior

Personal information
- Born: October 24, 2004 (age 22)
- Listed height: 5 ft 11 in (1.80 m)
- Listed weight: 210 lb (95 kg)

Career information
- High school: Blessed Trinity Catholic (Roswell, Georgia); Buford (Buford, Georgia)
- College: Alabama (2023–2024); Michigan (2025); Georgia Tech (2026–present)

Awards and highlights
- Third-team All-Big Ten (2025)
- Stats at ESPN

Justice Haynes (born October 24, 2004) is an American college football running back for the Georgia Tech Yellow Jackets. He previously played for the Alabama Crimson Tide and Michigan Wolverines.

== Early life ==
Haynes was born on October 24, 2004, the son of Verron Haynes and Brandi Gowdey, and was raised in Buford, Georgia. His father played in the National Football League (NFL) for the Pittsburgh Steelers and Atlanta Falcons, winning Super Bowl XL with Pittsburgh. Justice Haynes first attended Blessed Trinity Catholic High School in Roswell, Georgia, where he played football and baseball. As a freshman, he ran for 1,754 yards and 18 touchdowns, helping Blessed Trinity win the Georgia state championship. In the COVID-19-shortened 2020 season, he played in nine games but still managed to run for 1,750 yards and 25 touchdowns, averaging 9.9 yards-per-carry. In 2021, he ran for 2,375 yards and 29 touchdowns, averaging 8.6 yards-per-carry.

In 2022, Haynes transferred to Buford High School for his senior season, ending his career at Blessed Trinity running for close to 6,000 yards and 72 touchdowns. In his lone year at Buford, he averaged 11.1 yards-per-carry and ran for 1,695 yards while scoring 26 total touchdowns. As a five-star prospect, Haynes was invited to play in the All-American Bowl. He was ranked as the nation's best running back, and the 29th overall player by Rivals. Haynes committed to play college football for Nick Saban and the Alabama Crimson Tide.

== College career ==
=== Alabama ===
In 2023, Haynes enrolled at the University of Alabama and saw playing time as a true freshman. He ended the season with 25 rush attempts for 168 yards and two touchdowns. Haynes scored his first two collegiate touchdowns against Chattanooga, and saw key carries in the 2024 Rose Bowl.

In 2024, Haynes played in all twelve regular season games, starting in six for the Crimson Tide as a sophomore. He carried the ball 79 times for 448 yards and seven touchdowns, adding 17 receptions for 99 yards. Haynes finished tied for second on the team in rushing touchdowns, third in rushing yards and fourth in receptions. On December 13, 2024, Haynes entered the NCAA transfer portal after two seasons with Alabama.

=== Michigan ===
On December 24, 2024, Haynes transferred to the University of Michigan, to play under Michigan Wolverines head coach Sherrone Moore. In the first game of the 2025 season against New Mexico, Haynes had 16 carries for a career-high 159 yards and three touchdowns. In week two against Oklahoma, he rushed 19 times for 125 yards and a touchdown, and in week three against Central Michigan he rushed 14 times for 104 yards and a touchdown. In week four against Nebraska, Haynes had 17 carries for 149 yards and a touchdown, his third touchdown of the season of 50+ yards. Haynes’ 537 rushing yards through the first four games surpassed his previous season-high in 2024. He also became the first player in Michigan football history to have four consecutive 100-yard games to start their career with the program.

Haynes rushed for his fifth straight 100-yard game against Wisconsin, finishing with 19 carries for 117 yards and two touchdowns. He became the first Michigan player to rush for over 100 yards in the first five games of a season since Denard Robinson in 2010, and his eight touchdowns through the first five games ranks third since 1995, behind only Blake Corum in 2022 and 2023. In the sixth game against USC, Haynes suffered an upper body injury in the second quarter, halting his yardage and touchdown streaks after rushing for 51 yards. He missed the remainder of the contest and the next game. Haynes returned against Michigan State, rushing 26 times for 152 yards and two touchdowns. His 171 total yards were a season-high, helping the Wolverines defeat their instate rival for a fourth consecutive season and earning him Co-Big Ten Offensive Player of the Week honors. Haynes was unfortunately injured in the second half of the game, and as a result forced to have surgery on his foot. In the seven games he started, Haynes had 121 carries for 857 yards and 10 touchdowns.

=== Georgia Tech ===
On January 14, 2026, it was reported that Haynes committed to the Georgia Institute of Technology via the NCAA Transfer Portal after spending just one year with the Michigan Wolverines.
