= Jalen Milroe =

American football player (born 2002)

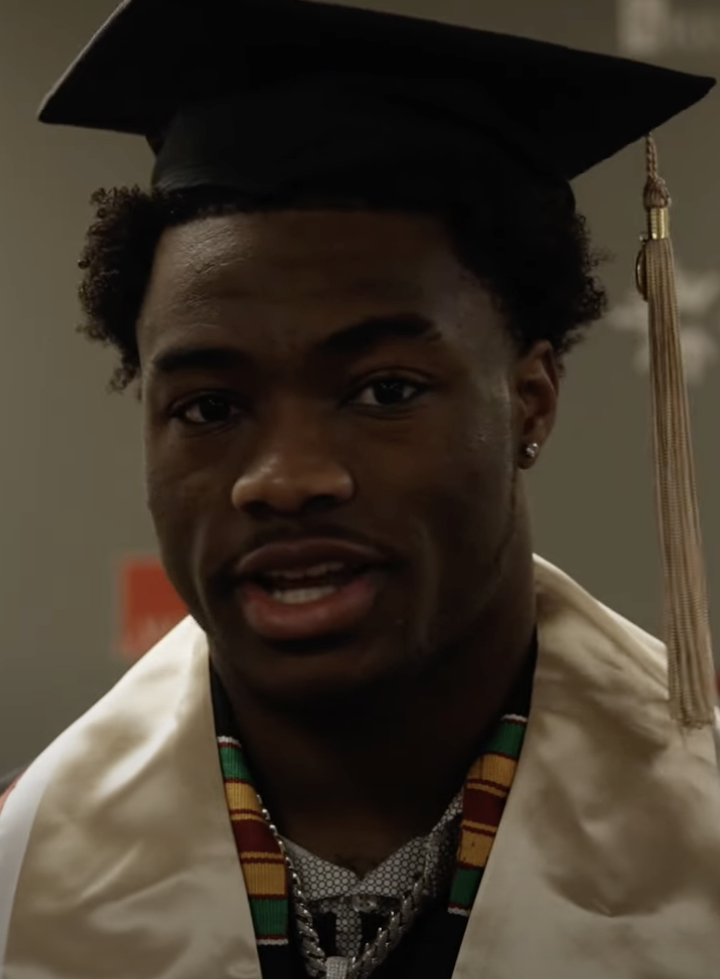
- Milroe in 2023

No. 6 – Seattle Seahawks
- Position: Quarterback
- Roster status: Active

Personal information
- Born: December 13, 2002 (age 23); Houston, Texas, U.S.
- Listed height: 6 ft 2 in (1.88 m)
- Listed weight: 216 lb (98 kg)

Career information
- High school: Obra D. Tompkins (Katy, Texas)
- College: Alabama (2021–2024)
- NFL draft: 2025: 3rd round, 92nd overall pick

Career history
- Seattle Seahawks (2025–present)

Awards and highlights
- Super Bowl champion (LX); William V. Campbell Trophy (2024); Second-team All-SEC (2023)

Career NFL statistics as of 2025
- Rushing yards: 4
- Stats at Pro Football Reference

Jalen Oluwaseun Isaiah Milroe (born December 13, 2002) is an American professional football quarterback for the Seattle Seahawks of the National Football League (NFL). He played college football for the Alabama Crimson Tide and won the 2024 William V. Campbell Trophy. Milroe was selected by the Seahawks in the third round of the 2025 NFL draft and won Super Bowl LX as a backup.

== Early life ==
Milroe was born into a military family; his father Quentin served in the Marine Corps in the Iraq War and his mother Lola worked in the medical field for the Navy. Milroe's family moved to Katy, Texas when he was three, and he attended Tompkins High School in Katy. As a junior, he threw for 2,689 yards and 29 touchdowns adding an additional eight touchdowns rushing and 378 yards. In 2020 as a senior, he passed for 1,136 yards and 13 touchdowns. During his high school career, Milroe tallied 3,825 passing yards, 559 rushing yards, and 53 total touchdowns leading Tompkins to over 30 wins in three seasons. He originally committed to Texas before deciding to switch to the University of Alabama.

== College career ==
=== 2021 season ===
Milroe was the backup to sophomore quarterback Bryce Young throughout the 2021 season. As a result, Milroe was redshirted. During the season he appeared in four games completing three passes for 41 yards and a touchdown while rushing for 57 yards on 15 carries.

=== 2022 season ===
Milroe began the 2022 season as the backup to Young again. In Alabama's Spring Game, Milroe completed 11 passes for 149 yards and a touchdown. In his first appearance of the season, he recorded eight completions, 76 yards, a touchdown, and an interception. He made minor appearances in relief against Louisiana Monroe and Vanderbilt before he took over as the quarterback in week four against Arkansas after an injury to Young. Milroe threw and rushed for a touchdown each, leading Alabama to a 49–26 victory. One week later, he made his first career start against Texas A&M, throwing for three touchdowns and recording three turnovers in a 24–20 win.

=== 2023 season ===
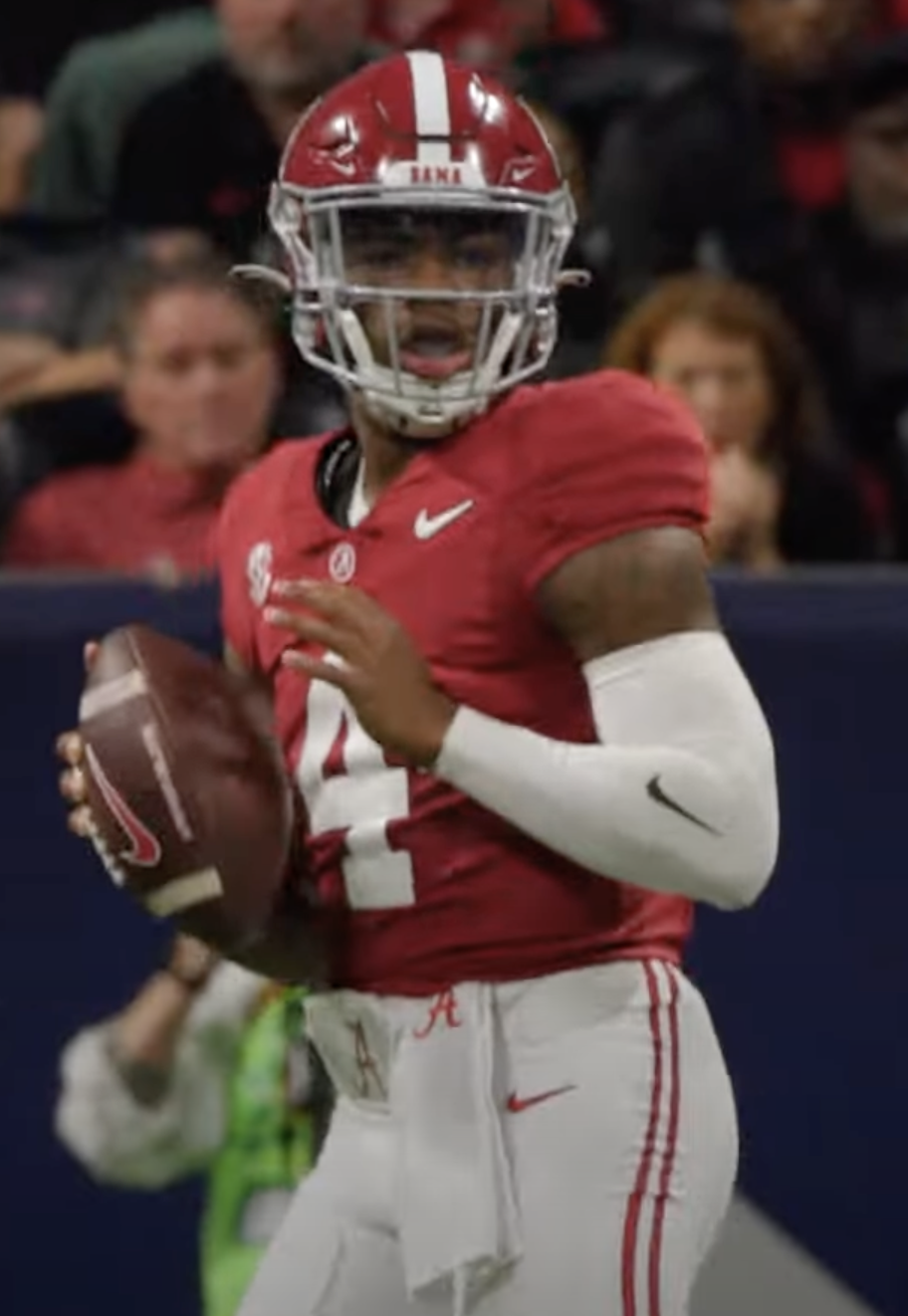
Milroe with the Alabama Crimson Tide, 2023

Entering the 2023 season, with the departure of Young, Milroe competed with Ty Simpson and Tyler Buchner for Alabama's starting quarterback job, with Milroe eventually being named the starter. In week one against Middle Tennessee, Milroe combined for a total of five touchdowns, three passing and two rushing, while throwing for 194 yards on 13 completions, leading Alabama to a 56–7 victory. The following week, Milroe threw for 255 yards, two touchdowns, and two interceptions in a 24–34 defeat against no. 11 Texas, his first career loss as a starter. He was replaced as starting quarterback by Tyler Buchner. Heading into Alabama's SEC opener against Ole Miss the following week, Nick Saban announced that Milroe would be the team's starting quarterback for the rest of the season, after a poor showing from Buchner against USF. Against no. 14 LSU, Milroe rushed for a then career-high 155 yards and four touchdowns, while also throwing for 219 yards in a 42–28 victory. The following week, Milroe totaled six total touchdowns, three passing and three rushing, leading Alabama to a 49–21 rout of Kentucky. Against Auburn in the Iron Bowl, Milroe threw the game-winning touchdown pass to Isaiah Bond on fourth and goal from the Auburn 31 yard line with 31 seconds left in the fourth quarter. He finished the game throwing for 254 yards and two touchdowns, while also rushing for an additional 107 yards.

During the 2023 regular season, Milroe led Alabama to a 12–1 record, including an SEC Championship. During the 2023 SEC Championship Game, he passed for two touchdowns and 192 yards and was named the game's MVP in a 27–24 victory over No. 1 Georgia. Milroe finished the year with 23 passing touchdowns, 2,718 passing yards, six interceptions, and twelve rushing touchdowns. He also finished 6th in the Heisman Trophy voting with 4 first place votes, 8 second place votes, and 45 third place votes. Against no. 1 Michigan in the 2024 Rose Bowl, Milroe threw for 116 yards and rushed for an additional 63 yards, and Michigan won 27–20 in overtime.

=== 2024 season ===
In the season opener against Western Kentucky, Milroe totaled five touchdowns, three passing and two rushing, in a 63–0 victory. Against no. 2 Georgia, he threw for 374 yards and two touchdowns, including a 75-yard go-ahead touchdown pass to Ryan Coleman-Williams, while also rushing for 117 yards and an additional two touchdowns, leading Alabama to a 41–34 victory. Against no. 15 LSU, Milroe rushed for a career-high 185 yards and four touchdowns in a 42–13 victory. At the end of the season, he was announced as the recipient of the William V. Campbell Trophy. In the 2024 ReliaQuest Bowl, he completed 16 of 32 passes for 192 yards and a touchdown while also committing three turnovers in a 13–19 loss to Michigan. Milroe finished the 2024 season, totaling 2,844 passing yards, 726 rushing yards, 35 total touchdowns and 11 interceptions.

=== College statistics ===
Season	Team	Games			Passing								Rushing			
Season	Team	GP	GS	Record	Comp	Att	Pct	Yards	Avg	TD	Int	Rate	Att	Yards	Avg	TD
2021	Alabama	4	0	—	3	7	42.9	41	5.9	1	0	139.2	15	57	3.8	0
2022	Alabama	8	1	1–0	31	53	58.5	297	5.6	5	3	125.4	31	263	8.5	1
2023	Alabama	13	13	11–2	187	284	65.8	2,834	10.0	23	6	172.2	161	531	3.3	12
2024	Alabama	13	13	9–4	205	319	64.3	2,844	8.9	16	11	148.8	168	726	4.3	20
Career		38	27	21–6	426	663	64.3	6,016	9.1	45	20	156.8	375	1,577	4.2	33

== Professional career ==
Milroe declared for the 2025 NFL draft on January 2, 2025.

Pre-draft measurables
Height	Weight	Arm length	Hand span	Wingspan	40-yard dash	10-yard split	20-yard split
6 ft 1 7/8 in (1.88 m)	217 lb (98 kg)	30 5/8 in (0.78 m)	9 3/8 in (0.24 m)	6 ft 4 5/8 in (1.95 m)	4.40 s	1.44 s	2.57 s
All values from NFL Combine/Pro Day

In February 2025, Milroe's hand span reportedly grew from 8 3/4 in (220 mm) to 9 3/8 in (240 mm).

Milroe was drafted by the Seattle Seahawks with the 92nd overall pick in the third round of the 2025 NFL draft. The Seahawks previously traded quarterback Geno Smith to the Las Vegas Raiders to obtain the pick. He was part of the Seahawks team that won Super Bowl LX.

== NFL career statistics ==
Legend
Won the Super Bowl

=== Regular season ===
Year	Team	Games			Passing									Rushing					Sacks		Fumbles	
Year	Team	GP	GS	Record	Cmp	Att	Pct	Yds	Y/A	Lng	TD	Int	Rtg	Att	Yds	Y/A	Lng	TD	Sck	Yds	Fum	Lost
2025	SEA	3	0	—	0	0	0.0	0	—	0	0	0	0.0	3	4	1.3	3	0	0	0	1	1
Career		3	0	—	0	0	0.0	0	—	0	0	0	0.0	3	4	1.3	3	0	0	0	1	1

=== Postseason ===
Year	Team	Games			Passing									Rushing					Sacks		Fumbles	
Year	Team	GP	GS	Record	Cmp	Att	Pct	Yds	Y/A	Lng	TD	Int	Rtg	Att	Yds	Y/A	Lng	TD	Sck	SckY	Fum	Lost
2025	SEA	0	0	—	DNP																	

== Personal life ==
Milroe is a Christian and was baptized in 2022.

In 2023, Milroe and fellow Crimson Tide athlete Terrion Arnold launched LANK (Let All Naysayers Know) merch, which has been sold at Alabama merch stores and distributed to Crimson Tide alumni in the NFL, such as Jalen Hurts.

He is of Nigerian descent.
