= Deontae Lawson =

American football player (born 2003)

Profile
- Position: Linebacker

Personal information
- Born: February 11, 2003 (age 23); Mobile, Alabama, U.S.
- Listed height: 6 ft 3 in (1.91 m)
- Listed weight: 226 lb (103 kg)

Career information
- High school: Mobile Christian School (Mobile, Alabama)
- College: Alabama (2021–2025)
- NFL draft: 2026: undrafted

Career history
- Philadelphia Eagles (2026)*
- * Offseason or practice squad member only

Awards and highlights
- Second-team All-SEC (2025)
- Stats at Pro Football Reference

Deontae Lawson (born February 11, 2003) is an American professional football linebacker. He played college football for the Alabama Crimson Tide.

== Early life ==
Lawson attended Mobile Christian School in Mobile, Alabama. He was selected to the 2021 All-American Bowl. He committed to the University of Alabama to play college football.

== College career ==
Lawson played four games his first year at Alabama in 2021 and took a redshirt. In 2022, he started four of 11 games, recording 51 tackles. Lawson became a full time starter in 2023.

== Professional career ==
Pre-draft measurables
Height	Weight	Arm length	Hand span	Wingspan	Bench press
6 ft 2 7/8 in (1.90 m)	226 lb (103 kg)	31 7/8 in (0.81 m)	9 1/4 in (0.23 m)	6 ft 6 1/4 in (1.99 m)	20 reps
All values from NFL Combine/Pro Day

On April 25, 2026, Lawson signed with the Philadelphia Eagles as an undrafted free agent. He was waived by the Eagles as a part of final roster cuts on August 30.
