= Malachi Moore =

American football player (born 2001)

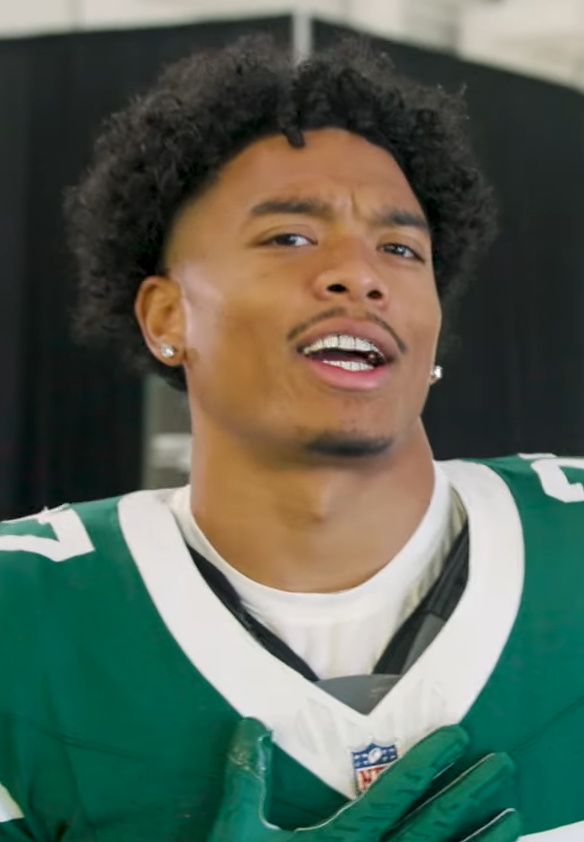
- Moore with the New York Jets in 2025

No. 27 – New York Jets
- Position: Safety
- Roster status: Active

Personal information
- Born: September 13, 2001 (age 25); Homewood, Alabama, U.S
- Listed height: 5 ft 11 in (1.80 m)
- Listed weight: 196 lb (89 kg)

Career information
- High school: Hewitt-Trussville (Trussville, Alabama)
- College: Alabama (2020–2024)
- NFL draft: 2025: 4th round, 130th overall pick

Career history
- New York Jets (2025–present)

Career NFL statistics as of Week 6, 2026
- Tackles: 108
- Forced fumbles: 1
- Pass deflections: 3
- Fumble recoveries: 1
- Stats at Pro Football Reference

Malachi Moore (born September 13, 2001) is an American professional football safety for the New York Jets of the National Football League (NFL). He played college football for the Alabama Crimson Tide and was selected by the Jets in the fourth round of the 2025 NFL draft.

== Early life ==
Moore was born in Homewood, Alabama and attended Hewitt-Trussville High School in Trussville, Alabama. Moore is of mixed Laotian and African American descent.He played both cornerback and safety in high school. As a senior, he had 80 tackles and four interceptions. He was selected to play in the 2020 All-American Bowl. Moore committed to the University of Alabama to play college football.

== College career ==
Moore became a starter during his true freshman year at Alabama in 2020.

Near the end of a game against Vanderbilt in 2024, where his team was losing as Vanderbilt took their kneel downs, Moore forcibly grabbed Vanderbilt quarterback Diego Pavia's facemask and slammed his head into the ground following the whistle, screamed at his teammates, threw his mouthpiece prior to a play, and kicked the ball out of a referee's hand after it was spotted, leading to an unsportsmanlike conduct penalty. In the middle of Moore's outburst, Alabama's defensive coordinator Kane Wommack attempted to substitute Moore out of play, but he refused to exit. After the game, he was criticized for his outbursts on social media, that even his teammate, linebacker Que Robinson, called safety Malachi Moore's outburst at the end of the game unacceptable, noting his role as a team captain. Two days later, Moore apologized for his actions on social media, saying, "I want to apologize to my teammates, our coaches, the fans, our alumni and my family for the way I acted on Saturday. I let the emotions of the game get the best of me and put myself before the team. As a two-time captain and a fifth-year player, I understand the standard that we are expected to live up to at Alabama, and I failed to do so by acting in a selfish and unacceptable manner. I came back this season to represent myself, this team and this university because it means something to me. I am blessed to be able to wear the 'A' on my chest, and I know all that comes with the responsibility of representing this program. I will do better to uphold the Alabama standard moving forward, and I will continue to work and improve while conducting myself in a first-class manner."

Despite the meltdown, he was not suspended by the team for his actions. He finished his college career with 214 combined tackles, 7 INTs, 1 defensive touchdown coming from a fumble recovery in his freshman year and a punt return touchdown in 2022.

Moore accepted an invite to play in the 2025 Senior Bowl.

== Professional career ==
Pre-draft measurables
Height	Weight	Arm length	Hand span	Wingspan	40-yard dash	10-yard split	20-yard split	Vertical jump	Broad jump	Bench press
5 ft 11 1/4 in (1.81 m)	196 lb (89 kg)	29 5/8 in (0.75 m)	9 in (0.23 m)	6 ft 3 1/4 in (1.91 m)	4.57 s	1.61 s	2.71 s	36.0 in (0.91 m)	10 ft 6 in (3.20 m)	15 reps
All values from NFL Combine/Pro Day

Moore was selected by the New York Jets with the 130th pick in the fourth round of the 2025 NFL draft.

== NFL career statistics ==
Year	Team	Games		Tackles					Interceptions						Fumbles				
Year	Team	GP	GS	Cmb	Solo	Ast	Sck	TFL	Int	Yds	Avg	Lng	TD	PD	FF	Fmb	FR	Yds	TD
2025	NYJ	17	14	101	56	45	0.0	3	0	0	0.0	0	0	3	1	1	1	25	0
Career		17	14	101	56	45	0.0	3	0	0	0.0	0	0	3	1	1	1	25	0
