= Rico Scott =

American football player

No. 7 – Alabama Crimson Tide
- Position: Wide receiver
- Class: Junior

Personal information
- Listed height: 6 ft 0 in (1.83 m)
- Listed weight: 203 lb (92 kg)

Career information
- High school: Bishop McDevitt (Harrisburg, Pennsylvania)
- College: Alabama (2024–present)
- Stats at ESPN

Rico Scott is an American college football wide receiver for the Alabama Crimson Tide.

== Early life ==
Scott attended Bishop McDevitt High School in Harrisburg, Pennsylvania. He was rated as a four-star recruit by 247Sports and committed to play college football for the Alabama Crimson Tide over offers from Colorado, Georgia, Tennessee, Texas A&M, and Penn State.

== College career ==
As a freshman during the 2024 season, Scott totaled five receptions for 60 yards and a touchdown. In week one of the 2025 season, he hauled in a touchdown reception in a loss against Florida State. Scott finished the 2025 season with 11 catches for 98 yards and two touchdowns. After the season, he entered the NCAA transfer portal, but ultimately returned to the Crimson Tide.
