= Landon (surname) =

Landon is a surname. Notable people with the surname include:

- Alf Landon (1887–1987), American politician
- Bruce Landon (born 1949), Canadian ice hockey player
- Castille Landon (born 1991), American actress and filmmaker
- Charles Landon (cricketer) (1850–1903), English cricketer
- Charles N. Landon (1878–1937), American illustrator
- Charles Paul Landon (1760–1826), French painter
- Christopher Landon (screenwriter) (1911–1961), British novelist and screenwriter
- Christopher Landon (filmmaker) (born 1975), American film director, producer, and screenwriter
- Dena Landon (born 1977), American author
- Edward Ruggles Landon (1813–1883), American politician and judge from Connecticut
- Eric Landon (born 1976), Danish-American ceramicist and designer
- Felicity Landon, English journalist
- Francis G. Landon (1859–1947), American soldier and politician
- Fred Landon (1880–1969), Canadian journalist
- Hal Landon Jr. (born 1941), American actor
- H. C. Robbins Landon (1926–2009), American musicologist
- Herman Landon (1859–1948), British general
- Hugues Landon (born 1930), French equestrian
- Jennifer Landon (born 1983), American actress
- John Landon (Iowa politician) (1950–2021), American politician
- John Landon (Michigan politician) (1833–1871), American politician
- Jon Landon (born 1979), Canadian football player
- Judy Landon (1928–2021), American actress
- Kenneth Landon (1903–1993), American missionary
- Kristine Landon-Smith (born 1958), British actor, director and artistic director
- Lara Landon (born 1985), American musician
- Larry Landon (born 1958), Canadian ice hockey player
- Laurene Landon (born 1957), American actress
- Leslie Landon (born 1962), American actress and psychologist
- Letitia Elizabeth Landon (1802–1838), British writer
- Lorraine Landon (born 1947), Australian basketball player and administrator
- Margaret Landon (1903–1993), American novelist
- Mark Landon (1948–2009), American actor
- Melville D. Landon (1839–1910), American journalist and humorist
- Michael Landon (1936–1991), American actor
- Michael Landon Jr. (born 1964), American actor
- Neil Landon (1941–2020), English singer
- Perceval Landon (1868–1927), British writer
- Richard Landon (born 1970), British footballer
- Richmond Landon (1898–1971), American athlete
- Susan M. Landon (born 1950), American petroleum geologist
- Timothy Landon (1942–2007), British soldier and politician
- Tina Landon (born 1963), American choreographer
- Truman H. Landon (1905–1986), American air force general
- Whittington Landon (1758–1838), English academic administrator and cleric

== See also ==
- Lendon
- Lindon (surname)
- London (surname)
- Lundon
