= List of Belmont University alumni =

Belmont University is a Christian university in Nashville, Tennessee. The university was called Belmont College for Young Women from 1890 to 1913, Ward-Belmont College from 1913 to 1951, and Belmont College from 1951 to 1991. Following are some of its notable alumni.

== Business ==
- Damon T. Hininger, MBA, chief executive officer of the Corrections Corporation of America
- R. Milton Johnson, chairman and CEO of Hospital Corporation of America

== Entertainment ==
- McKinley Belcher III, actor
- Abbie Callahan, country singer
- Blair Fowler, interior designer, former YouTuber
- Sean Hetherington, reality television producer and pundit
- DJ Qualls, actor
- Rachel Smith, Miss Tennessee Teen USA 2002, Miss Tennessee USA 2007, and Miss USA 2007
- Tony Vincent, actor

== Literature and journalism ==
- Elizabeth P. Farrington, publisher of the Honolulu Star-Bulletin and Congressional Delegate
- H. L. Hix, poet and academic
- Michael Jackman, columnist, poet, essayist, fiction writer, and college professor
- Clare Boothe Luce, editor and playwright
- Masood Ashraf Raja, writer and associate professor University of North Texas
- Lila Acheson Wallace, co-founder of Reader's Digest
- Lisa Williams, poet

== Music ==
- Greg Bates, country music singer-songwriter
- Didi Benami, American Idol finalist
- Jimmy Bowen, record producer and former pop music performer
- Becca Bradley, CCM musician and cellist
- Logan Brill, singer/songwriter
- Celeste Buckingham, Slovak singer-songwriter and pop musician
- Sarah Buxton, country music artist
- Chuck Cannon, songwriter
- Steven Curtis Chapman, Grammy Award-winning Christian artist
- Brandy Clark, country music artist
- Stela Cole (real name Hollyn Shadinger), singer-songwriter from Peachtree City, GA
- Ashley Cooke, country music singer-songwriter
- Travis Cottrell, Christian artist
- Cowboy Crush, country music band; all five members are alumnae
- Devin Dawson, country music artist
- Denver and the Mile High Orchestra, "big band" composed entirely of Belmont University alumni, was a finalist on The Next Great American Band
- Russell Dickerson, country music artist
- Melinda Doolittle, American Idol finalist
- Josie Edwards, singer-songwriter
- Jace Everett, recording artist
- Carter Faith, singer-songwriter
- Sharon Gilchrist, bluegrass musician and singer
- Ashley Gorley, songwriter and producer
- Andrew Greer, singer-songwriter
- Helen Hemphill, author
- Tyler Hubbard, half of country music group Florida Georgia Line
- Ashlyne Huff, singer-songwriter
- Jeff Irwin, musician
- Julienne Irwin, America's Got Talent finalist
- Ben Johnson, songwriter and producer
- Tamara "Taj" Johnson-George, member of R&B group SWV, author, and Survivor: Tocantins contestant
- Brian Kelley, half of the country music group Florida Georgia Line
- Gordon Kennedy, co-writer of Eric Clapton's song "Change the World" and Grammy Award winner for 1996 Song of the Year in 1996 and 2006 Best Pop Instrumental Album in 2006
- Hannah Kerr, CCM Singer
- Paul Klein, singer-songwriter for pop-rock band LANY
- Katy Kirby, musician
- Levi Kreis, Tony Award-winning music artist
- Lara Landon, CCM recording artist
- Chase Lawrence, member of the alternative band Coin
- Jesse Lee, country music singer
- Jim Lill, country musician
- Liza Anne, musician
- Kimberley Locke, American Idol finalist, music star, and plus-size model
- Kelley Lovelace, songwriter
- Willie Mack, singer-songwriter
- Mary Virginia Martin, actress, singer and Broadway star
- Sandra McCracken, 1999, singer-songwriter.
- Moon Taxi, indie-alternative rock band; all five members are alumnae
- Grace Moore, operatic soprano and actress in musical theatre and film
- Ginny Owens, Christian music artist
- John Mark Painter, musician and songwriter, member of rock-and-roll duo Fleming and John
- Brad Paisley, country music artist
- Minnie Pearl (real name Sarah Cannon), of Grand Ole Opry and Hee Haw fame; attended Belmont's predecessor, the Ward–Belmont School
- Jill Phillips, Christian music artist
- Julie Roberts, country music artist
- Frank Rogers, record producer
- Jake Wesley Rogers, musician
- Mackenzie Scott, performs as TORRES
- Harold "FYÜTCH" Simmons, Grammy Award-winning rapper, singer, songwriter, producer, composer
- Canaan Smith, country music singer-songwriter
- Todd Smith, Christian artist, lead singer of Selah
- Ric Steel, vocalist and instrumentalist
- Larry Stewart, country music artist, lead singer of Restless Heart
- Pam Tillis, country music artist
- Josh Turner, country music artist
- Troy Verges, songwriter
- Lee Ann Womack, country music artist
- Trisha Yearwood, country music artist
- Julianna Zobrist, Christian singer

== Politics ==
- Diane Black, U.S. representative from Tennessee
- Elizabeth P. Farrington, publisher of the Honolulu Star-Bulletin and congressional delegate
- Samuel Atta Mills, member of Parliament, Ghana

== Sports ==
- Brian Baker, professional tennis player
- Matt Beaty, former Major League Baseball player for the Los Angeles Dodgers
- Evan Bradds, assistant basketball coach
- Kayla Braxton, WWE broadcaster
- Alysha Clark (born 1987), American-Israeli basketball player for the Israeli team Elitzur Ramla and the Las Vegas Aces of the Women's National Basketball Association (WNBA)
- Ian Clark, NBA player
- Stu Grimson, former NHL enforcer
- Maya Johnson, professional softball player for the Oklahoma City Spark in the AUSL
- J.J. Mann, professional basketball player
- Joshua McAdams, track and field athlete
- Nico Olsak, Argentinian-born American-Israeli soccer player who plays in the Israeli Premier League
- Ricardo Patton, head basketball coach at Central High School
- Alex Renfroe, professional basketball player
- J. P. Rodrigues, professional soccer player
- Ben Sheppard, basketball player for the Indiana Pacers
- Dylan Windler, professional basketball player

== Other ==
- Jean MacArthur, supporter of the Metropolitan Opera and other charities, wife of U.S. Army General of the Army Douglas MacArthur
