= Lendon =

Lendon is a surname, and may refer to:

- A. A. Lendon (died 1935), English medical doctor in South Australia
- Alan Harding Lendon (1903–1973), South Australian surgeon, aviculturist and ornithologist

== See also ==
- Landon (surname)
- McLendon
