= Charles Landon =

Charles Landon may refer to:

- Charles Landon (cricketer) (1850–1903), English cricketer
- Charles N. Landon (1878–1937), American illustrator
- Charles Paul Landon (1760–1826), French painter
