= Lindon (surname) =

Lindon is a surname, and may refer to:

- Albert Lindon (1891–1976), British football player and manager.
- Alfred Lindon (c. 1867–1948), Polish-British jeweller, businessman and art collector
- J. A. Lindon (c. 1914–1979), English palindromist and poet
- Jérôme Lindon (1925-2001), French publisher
- Lionel Lindon (1905–1971), American film cameraman and cinematographer
- Luke Lindon (1915–1988), American football player
- Mathieu Lindon (born 1955), French journalist and writer
- Millie Lindon (1869–1940), English music hall singer and socialite
- Raymond Lindon (1901–1992), French magistrate and mayor
- Patrick Lindon (born 1965), Swiss industrial designer
- Richard Lindon (1816–1887), English leatherworker, one of the creators of the rugby ball
- Suzanne Lindon (born 2000), French actress and filmmaker
- Vincent Lindon (born 1959), French actor and filmmaker

== See also ==
- Linden (surname)
- Lyndon (surname)
- McLindon
