= London (name) =

London is a surname of English origin, derived from the city of London. It is also a unisex given name.

== People with the surname London ==
- Adam London (born 1988), English cricketer
- Ann London Scott (1929–1975), American feminist
- Artur London (1915–1986), Czechoslovak communist politician
- Bobby London (born 1950), American comic artist
- Brian London (1934–2021), British boxer
- Drake London (born 2001), American football player
- Edythe D. London (1948–2026), American pharmacologist
- Frank London (born 1958), American trumpeter, bandleader and composer
- Fritz London (1900–1954), German physicist, brother of Heinz London
- Gene London (1931–2020), American television presenter
- George London (1920–1985), American operatic baritone
- George London (1681–1714), English nurseryman and garden designer
- Greg London (born 1966), American impressionist
- Heinz London (1907–1970), German physicist, brother of Fritz London
- Herbert London (1939–2018), American conservative, professor, and author
- Jack London (1876–1916), American author
- Jason London (born 1972), American actor
- Jay London (born 1966), American comedian
- Jeremy London (born 1972), American actor
- Jerry London (born 1947), American film and television director and producer
- Joan London (American writer) (1901–1971), American writer
- Joan London (Australian author) (born 1948), Australian fiction writer
- John London (1942–2000), American musician and songwriter
- Julie London (1926–2000), American singer and actress
- LaCale London (born 1997), American football player
- LaToya London (born 1978), American singer and actress
- Lauren London (born 1984), American actress and model
- Laurie London (born 1944), English singer
- Meyer London (1871–1926), American congressman
- Pamela London (born 1973), Guyanese boxer
- Paul London (born 1980), American professional wrestler
- Perry London (1931–1992), American psychologist, theorist, and academic administrator
- Solomon London (1661–1748), Lithuanian author and publisher
- Sondra London (born 1947), American true crime author
- Stacy London (born 1969), American fashion consultant and television presenter
- Stan London (1925 – 2020), doctor for the St. Louis Cardinals
- Theophilus London (born 1987), American rapper
- Tom London (1889–1963), American actor
- William Matthew London, Professor of public health and consumer advocate
- Yaron London (born 1940), Israeli media personality

== People with the given name London ==
- London Breed (born 1974), American politician and mayor of San Francisco
- London Keyes (born 1989), American pornographic actress
- London Fletcher (born 1975), American football player
- London Hughes (born 1989), British comedian, television writer and presenter
- London Humphreys (born 2005), American football player
- London Lamar (born 1990), American politician and Member of the Tennessee House of Representatives
- London Perrantes (born 1994), American basketball player in Israeli Basketball Premier League
- London Simmons (born 2006), American football player
- London on da Track (born 1991), birth name London Tyler Holmes, American record producer, rapper, and songwriter
- London Rainn (born 2002), American musician, filmmaker, audio engineer, and co-founder of The Grooks Inc.

== Fictional characters ==
- London Tipton, heiress of the Boston Tipton Hotel in The Suite Life of Zack & Cody
