= John Landon =

John Landon may refer to:

- John Landon (Iowa politician)
- John Landon (Michigan politician)

== See also ==
- Jon Landon, Canadian football player
