= Lundon =

Lundon is a surname, and may refer to:

- Anne Lundon, Scottish broadcaster
- DeLundon, American hip hop artist
- John Lundon, Member of Parliament
- John Lundon (cricketer), New Zealand cricketer
- Sean Lundon, English footballer
- Thomas Lundon, Irish nationalist politician
- Tony Lundon, Irish singer
- William Lundon, Irish nationalist politician

== See also ==
- London (surname)
- Lunden (surname)
- Lundon is an old name of London
