= McLindon =

McLindon is a surname. Notable people with the surname include:

- Aidan McLindon (born 1980), Australian politician
- Dan McLindon (born 1940), Scottish footballer and manager

== See also ==
- McLendon
- 24386 McLindon, main-belt minor planet
