= Solomon London =

Lithuanian author and publisher

Solomon ben Moses Raphael London (Hebrew: שלמה זלמן בן משה רפאל לונדן; 1661–1748) was a Lithuanian author and publisher, who lived in Novogrudok in the first half of the eighteenth century. He was the pupil of Rabbi Samuel Schotten of Frankfurt.

== Publications ==
- Zokher ha-berit. Amsterdam. 1710. On the rites of circumcision.
- Shem-Tov ibn Falaquera (1716). Tseri ha-yagon. Hanau.
- Moses ben Abraham Mat (1720). Mateh Mosheh. Frankfurt.
- Minḥah ḥadashah. Frankfurt. 1722. On the Pirkei Avot, containing extracts from Rashi, Maimonides, and the Pirkei Moshe and Lev Avot of Michael Moraftschek.
- Tikkun Shelomoh. Venice. 1733. The order of Sabbath prayers according to Isaac Luria.
- Orḥot tsadikkim. Amsterdam. 1735. With a Yiddish translation.
- Landau, Jacob (1738). Ha-agur. Offenbach.
- Kehillat Shelomoh. Amsterdam. 1744. a collection of rites, prayers, and dinim, with a small Hebrew and Yiddish vocabulary under the title Ḥinnukh Katan.
- Sefer ha-gan. Fürth. 1747. Moral exhortations of Judah Ḥasid, and the Hadrakah of Johanan Luria.
