= Katharina Kleinfeldt =

German television presenter

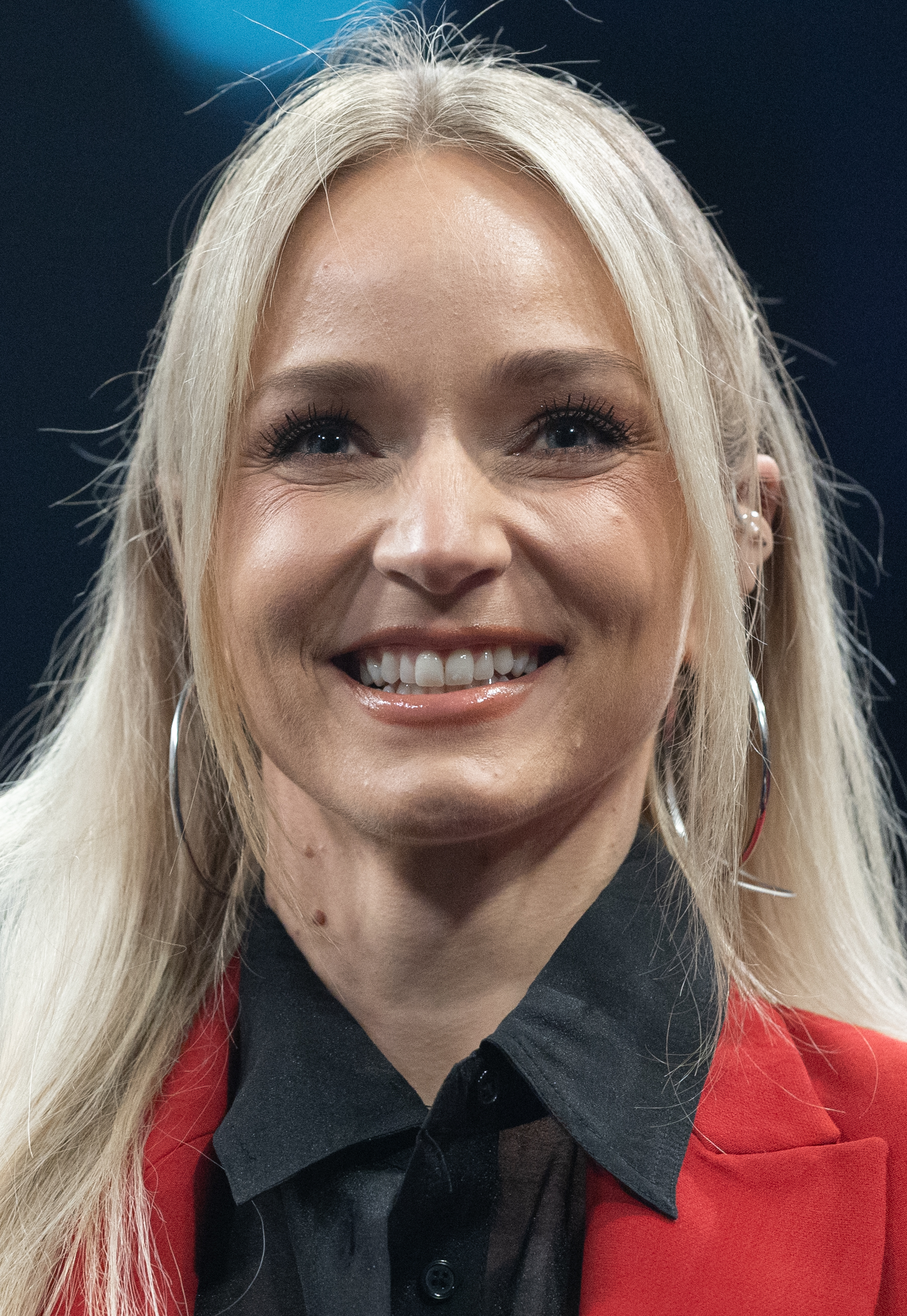
- Kleinfeldt in 2026.
- Born: 5 May 1993 (age 32); Schotten, Hesse, Germany
- Occupations: Television presenter, sports journalist
- Years active: 2015–present
- Television: Sky Sport News (2017–2023); Sport1 (2023–present)

Katharina Kleinfeldt (born 5 May 1993) is a German television presenter and sports journalist.

== Early life and education ==
Katharina Kleinfeldt was born in Schotten, Hesse and graduated in 2012 at the high school of Nidda with her Abitur. During her eleventh grade, she spent a year abroad with a host family in the United States and attended the Lee County High School in Sanford, North Carolina.

After playing football in her youth from 2004 to 2012, Kleinfeldt studied at the DMA Media Academy of Berlin. From 2012 to 2015, she studied Applied Media Studies there, specializing in sports journalism and sports management. She ended her studies graduating with a Bachelor of Arts. At the same time, she worked as a reporter and contributor for the online sports magazine hauptstadtsport.tv, for which she wrote match reports, made interviews and numerous self-tests in various sports.

== Television career ==
While still a student, Kleinfeldt completed an internship in the sports department of the ZDF morning program, where she already produced individual contributions in front of the camera.

During the 2015 FIFA Women's World Cup in Canada, she worked on-site as a presenter for the Allianz Bloghaus. Together with German soccer player Eunice Beckmann, she reported on the matches of Germany women's national football team and interviewed the players.

In September 2015, Kleinfeldt began an internship with the sports broadcaster Sky Deutschland. During this time, she worked as a reporter for the EHF Champions League and as a contributor to the 2. Bundesliga. Since then, she was also a reporter for the Wimbledon Championships in London.

In 2016, Kleinfeldt hosted Manuel Neuer's "little football school", in which Neuer himself and national football player Melanie Leupolz were involved in the program.

In August 2017, Kleinfeldt began her presenting career at Sky Sport News as the team's youngest presenter at the time. For the 2018–2019 season, she also took over the conference presentation of the Handball-Bundesliga and has regularly hosted HBL games on Thursday evenings.

In 2019, Kleinfeldt first hosted the Wimbledon program Quiet Please for Sky. Shortly after, during the group stage of the UEFA Champions League at the 2019–20 season, she alternated with Britta Hofmann as the presenter of the evening program Alle Spiele Alle Tore. During the 2020–21 season, she made her debut as the presenter of Champions Corner. She alternated with Martin Winkler on the show, in which experts such as Roman Weidenfeller, Patrick Owomoyela, André Breitenreiter and Jan Åge Fjørtoft watched and analyzed the evening's Champions League matches.

During the 2021–22 Bundesliga season, Kleinfeldt was on the sildelines of Sky as a field reporter for the Bundesliga where she made interviews before and after the match, and also hosted the 2. Bundesliga conference broadcast of that season.

In July 2023, she announced her departure from Sky to Sport1 via social media. She made her debut as a presenter at the top match of the 2. Bundesliga the same month. She also co-hosted the programs Doppelpass and Fantalk with Florian König. She also hosted the 2024 PDC World Darts Championship at Alexandra Palace in London.

In 2024, Kleinfeldt was once again on duty at the All England Lawn Tennis and Croquet Club for the Wimbledon tennis Grand Slam tournament. This time, together with Alexander Schlüter, she was one of the two main presenters for Amazon Prime.

== Private life ==
Since 2015, Katharina Kleinfeldt lives in Munich.
