= Schotten =

- Town
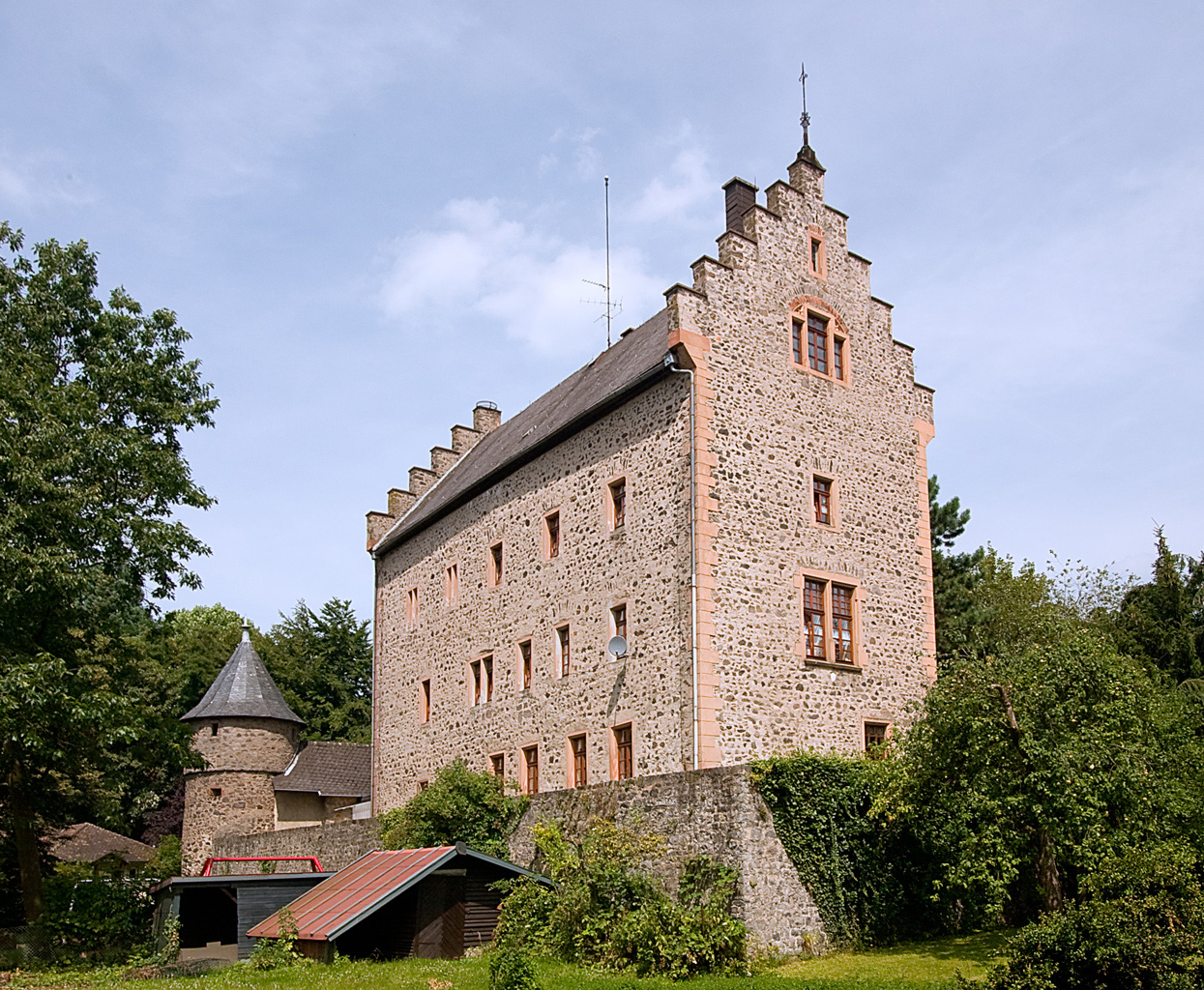
- Eppstein Castle in Schotten

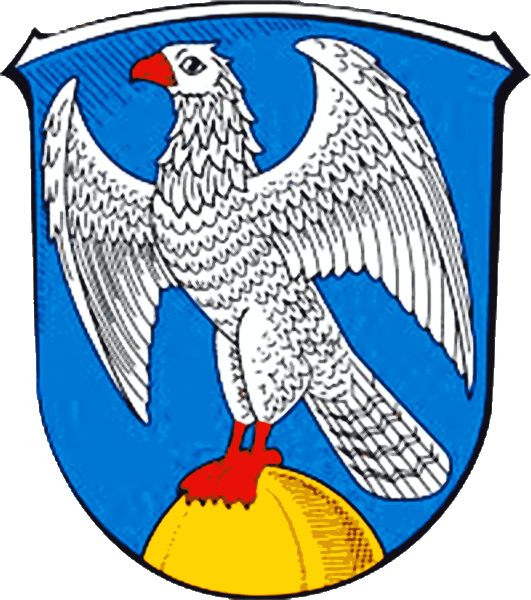
- Coat of arms

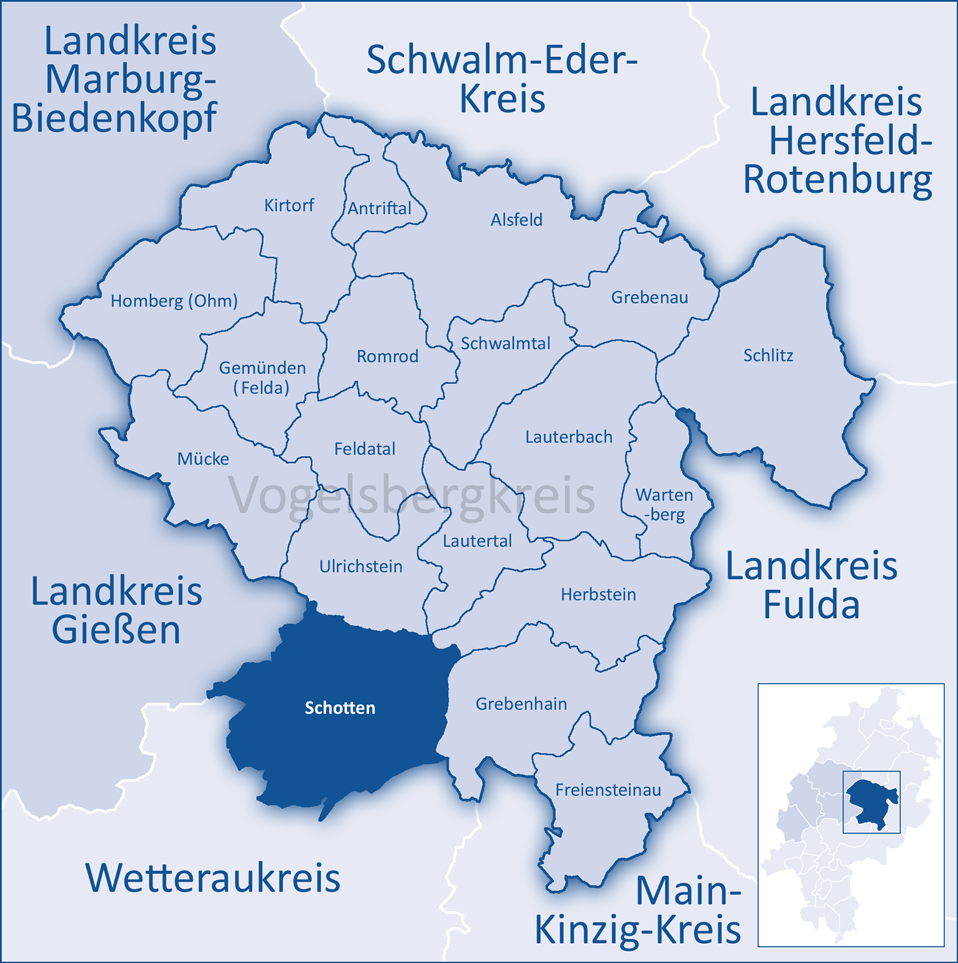
- Location of Schotten within Vogelsbergkreis district
- Interactive map of Schotten
- Location within Germany Location within Hesse
- Coordinates: 50°30′N 09°07′E
- Country: Germany
- State: Hesse
- Admin. region: Gießen
- District: Vogelsbergkreis
- Subdivisions: 14 Stadtteile

Government
  - Mayor (2017–23): Susanne Schaab (SPD)

Area
  - Total: 133.56 km^{2} (51.57 sq mi)
- Elevation: 330 m (1,080 ft)

Population (2025-12-31)
  - Total: 9,542
  - Density: 71.44/km^{2} (185.0/sq mi)
- Time zone: UTC+01:00 (CET)
  - Summer (DST): UTC+02:00 (CEST)
- Postal codes: 63679
- Dialling codes: 06044
- Vehicle registration: VB
- Website: http://www.schotten.de/

Schotten (German pronunciation: [ˈʃɔtn̩]) is a town in the middle of Hesse, Germany. Larger towns nearby include Alsfeld in the north, Fulda in the east, Friedberg in the south and Gießen in the west.

== Geography ==
=== Location ===
The officially recognised climatic spa lies between 168 m and 773 m above sea level on the western slope of the Vogelsberg Mountains. Nearby are Hoherodskopf (764 m) and Taufstein (773 m), the two highest peaks in the High Vogelsberg Nature Park. Schotten is a tourist town thanks to reliably high snowfall in the winter and hiking opportunities in the summer in the extensive forests. Watersports are also possible on the Nidda Reservoir.

In the outermost northwestern municipal area is the source of the river Nidda, a favourite destination for hikers.

=== Neighbouring municipalities ===
Schotten borders in the north on the town of Ulrichstein, in the northeast on the town of Herbstein, in the east on the municipality of Grebenhain, in the south on the town of Gedern and the municipality of Hirzenhain (both in the Wetteraukreis), and in the west on the town of Nidda (Wetteraukreis) and the town of Laubach (district).

=== Constituent municipalities ===
Besides the main town, which bears the same name as the whole municipality, Schotten is divided into the following municipalities: Betzenrod, Breungeshain, Burkhards, Busenborn, Eichelsachsen, Einartshausen, Eschenrod, Götzen, Kaulstoß, Michelbach, Rainrod, Rudingshain, Sichenhausen and Wingershausen.

== History ==
Archaeological finds from the Schotten area reach back to the New Stone Age. Several barrows bear witness to prehistoric times as do the "Alteburg" and "Wildhauskopf" ringwalls, whose building date is unknown.

Schotten had its first documentary mention in 778. The "Horstburg", a local castle near the constituent municipality of Rudingshain, may have stood in connection with the town's founding. There were digs at the ruins in the 1970s, and they were interpreted as having been a Carolingian royal court. Schotten is said to have been founded by Irish-Scottish monks. The Gothic Church of Our Lady was built in the 14th century.

In the Middle Ages, Schotten belonged to the Eppstein and Trimberg noble families. The Rhenish League of Towns, in a feud with these families, captured the town and destroyed the walls and the stately home. From 1403, Schotten belonged to the Hessian Landgraves. The current stately home, the Schotten Castle, dates from this time.

=== Municipal area development ===
Under the municipal reforms in the early 1970s, 15 municipalities were amalgamated into a greater municipality of Schotten.

== Coat of arms ==
Schotten's civic coat of arms might heraldically be described thus: In azure a falcon argent armed gules wings outstretched standing upon a hill. Or, the golden hill stands for the Vogelsberg Mountains. The falcon comes from a legend about the town's founding.

== Twin towns – sister cities ==
Schotten is twinned with:

- Arco, Italy (1960)
- Belœil, Belgium (1963)
- Crosne, France (1963)
- Rýmařov, Czech Republic (1996)
- Maybole, Scotland, United Kingdom (2000)

Schotten also has friendly relations with Bogen, Germany and Ozimek, Poland.

== Transport ==
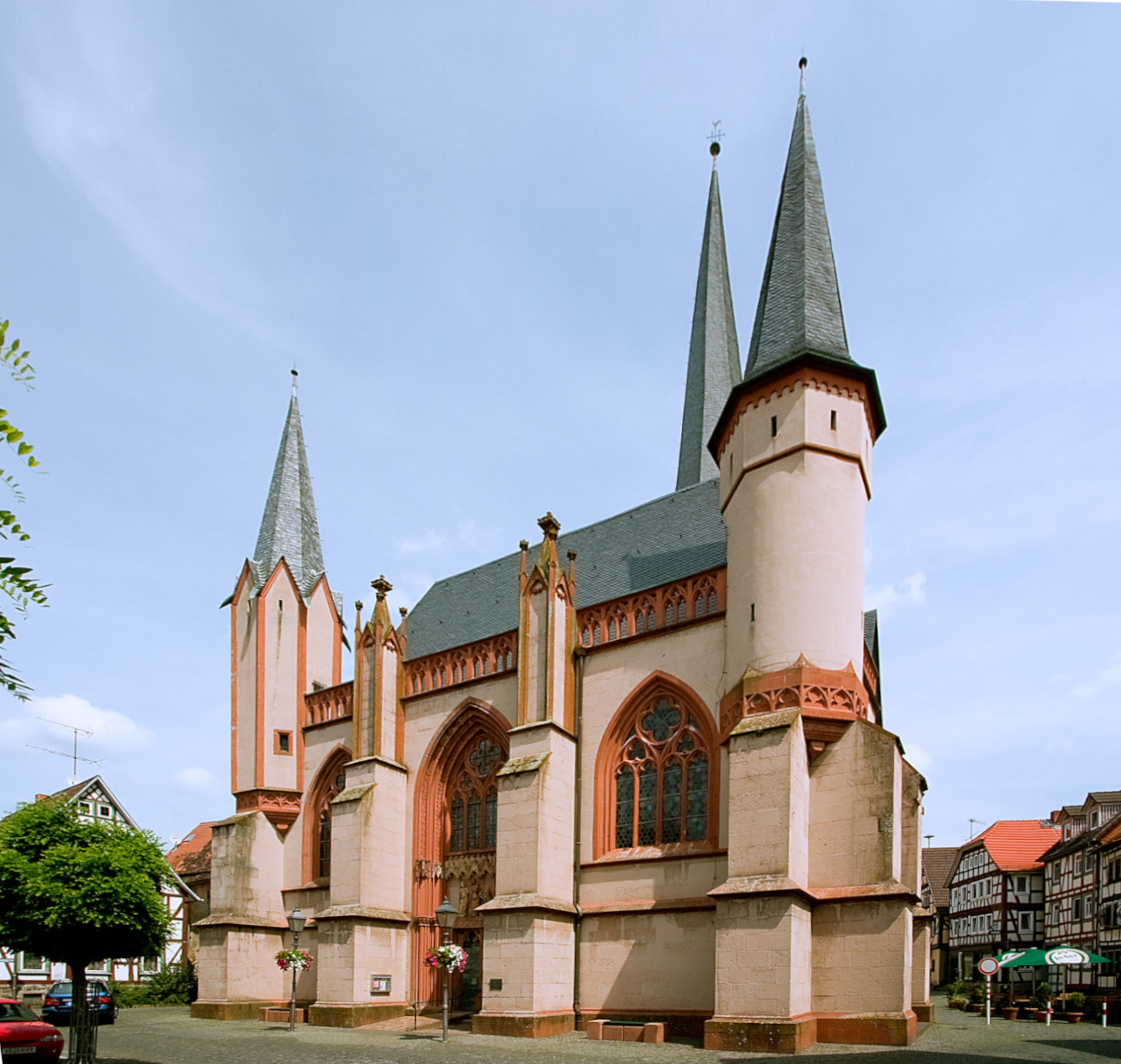
Church of Our Lady

Federal highways (Bundesstraßen) B 455 and B 276 run through the town. The nearest Autobahnen are the A 5 and the A 45.

The B 276 from Gedern by way of Schotten to Laubach is a notorious motorcycle road that attracts motorcyclists, not least of all for the motorcycle clubs along the road, such as the Falltorhaus ("Portcullis House"). There have been problems with street racing, which in 2005 left 12 people dead and another 129 injured. A particular problem on the highway is the "Applauskurve", a 180° bend in the road between Schotten and Laubach, known to motorcyclists all over Germany.

== Sports ==
In motorsport, the town is known for the Schottenring races.

== Sights ==
In the Old Town, there is the Church of Our Lady with its famous Marienaltar. The winged altar was made about 1385 by an unknown painter.

Schotten is home to the Niddastau Lake, a man-made lake suitable for recreation and water sports.

== Notable people ==
- Samuel Schotten (1644–1719), rabbi
- Wilhelm Gontrum (1910–1969), politician (CDU), Member of the Bundestag
- Harry H. Eckstein (1924-1999), political scientist
- Katharina Kleinfeldt (b. 1993), television presenter and sports journalist
- Miriam Rahimov (b. 1996), politician (Labour Party), councillor and deputy cabinet member of Bury Council
- Hermann Schotten (1503–1546), classicist, teacher and humanist author.

== Gallery ==
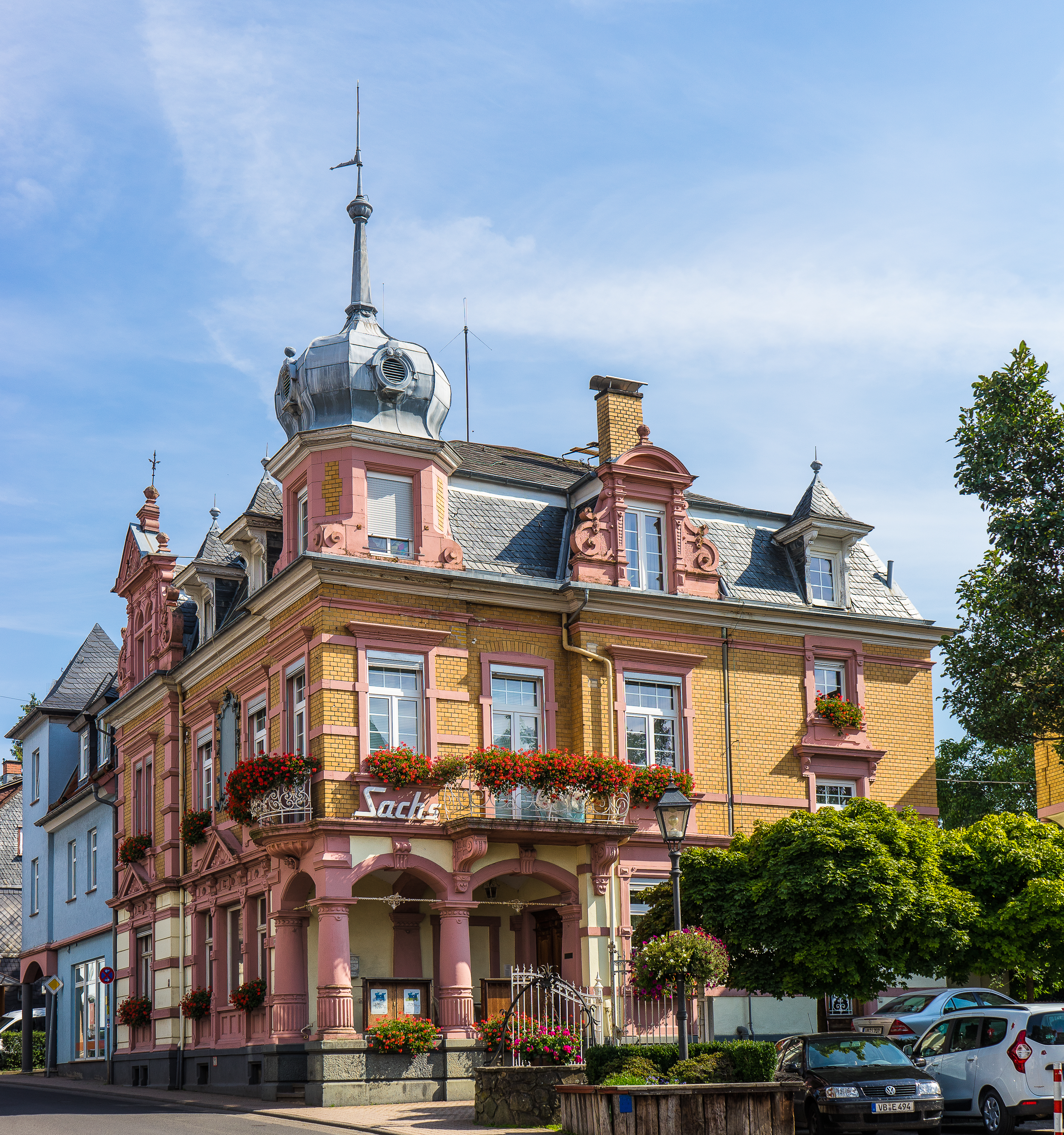
Villa Vogelsbergstr.121

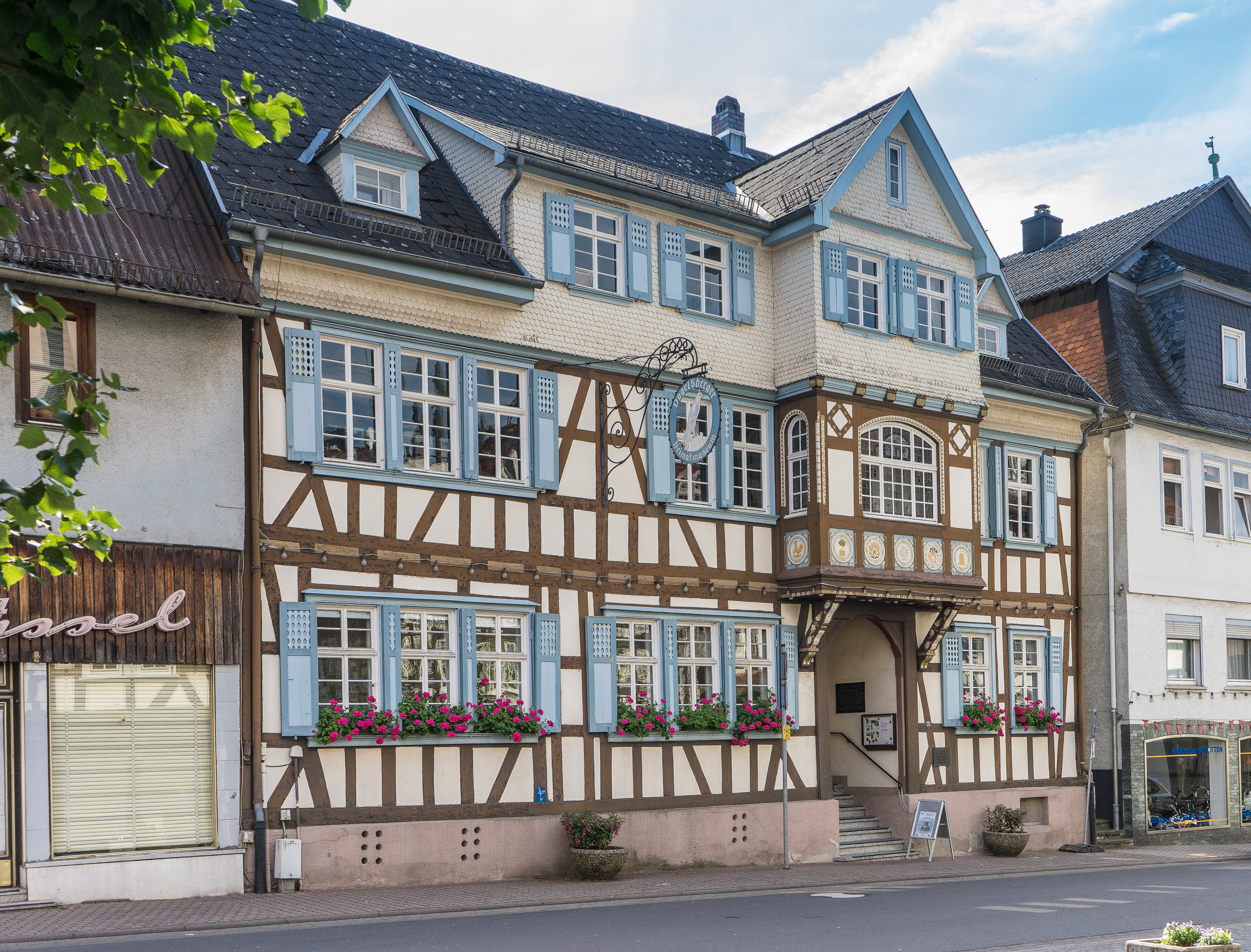
Vogelsberger Heimatmuseum

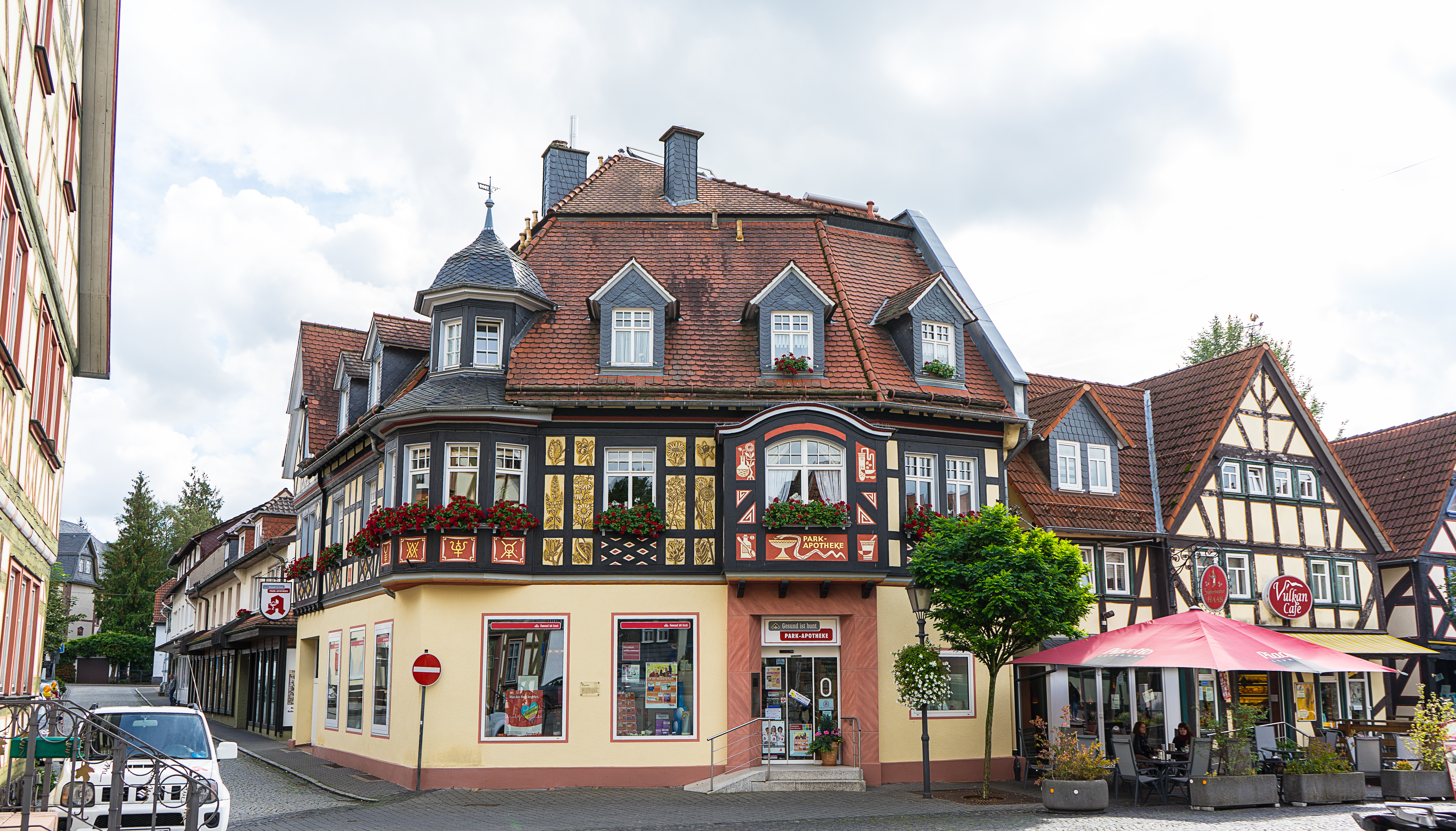
Oldtown Schotten

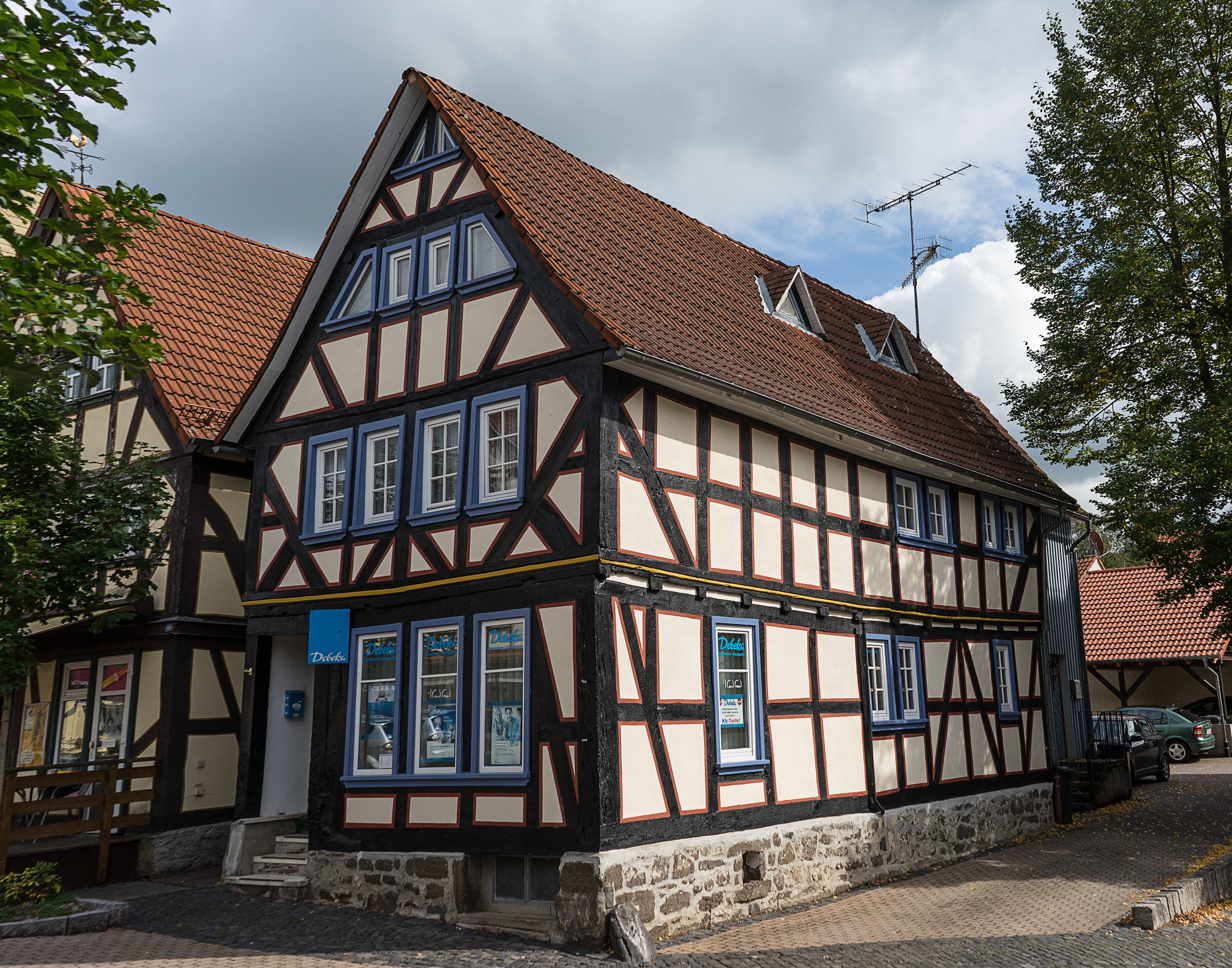
Oldtown Schotten

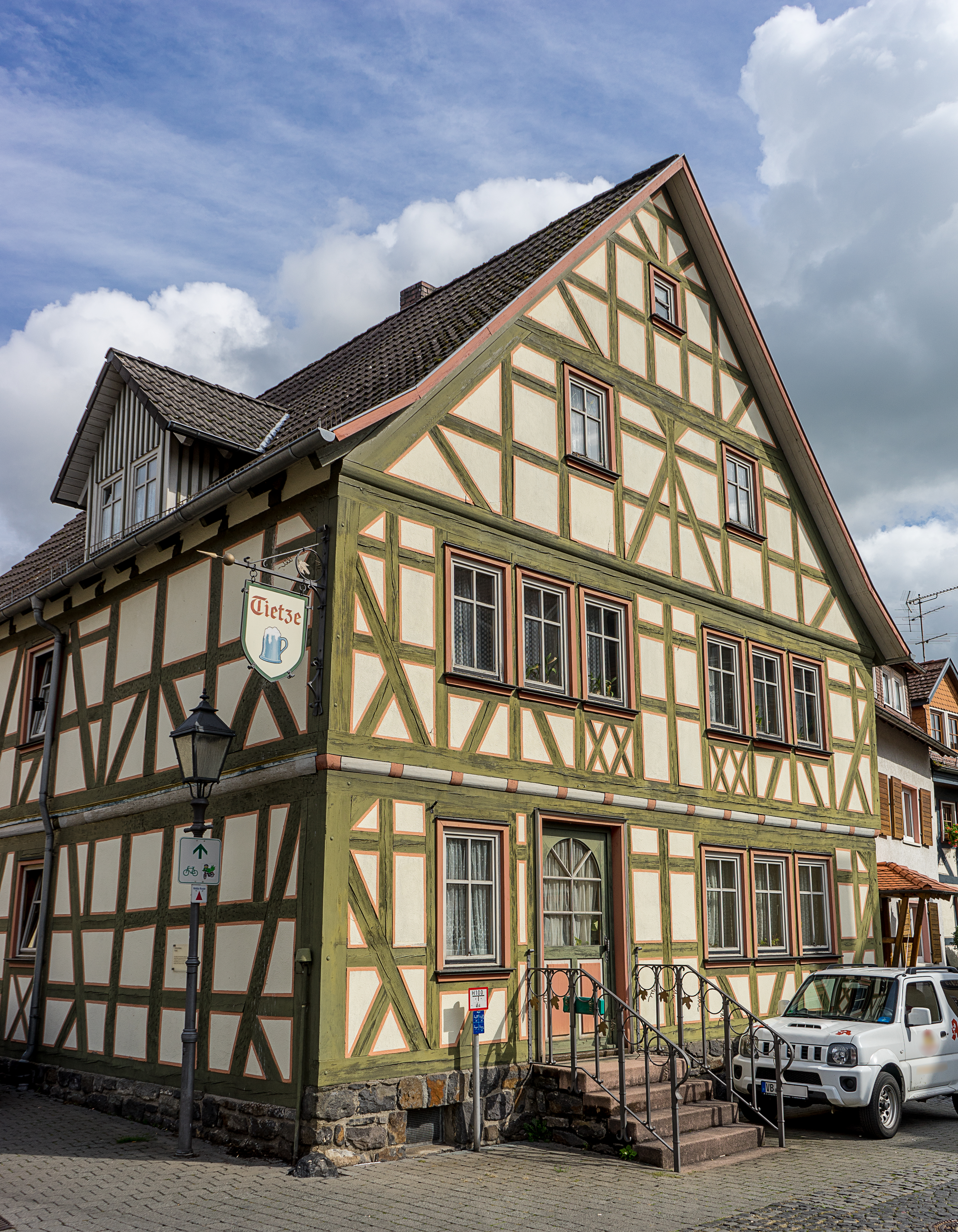
Oldtown Schotten

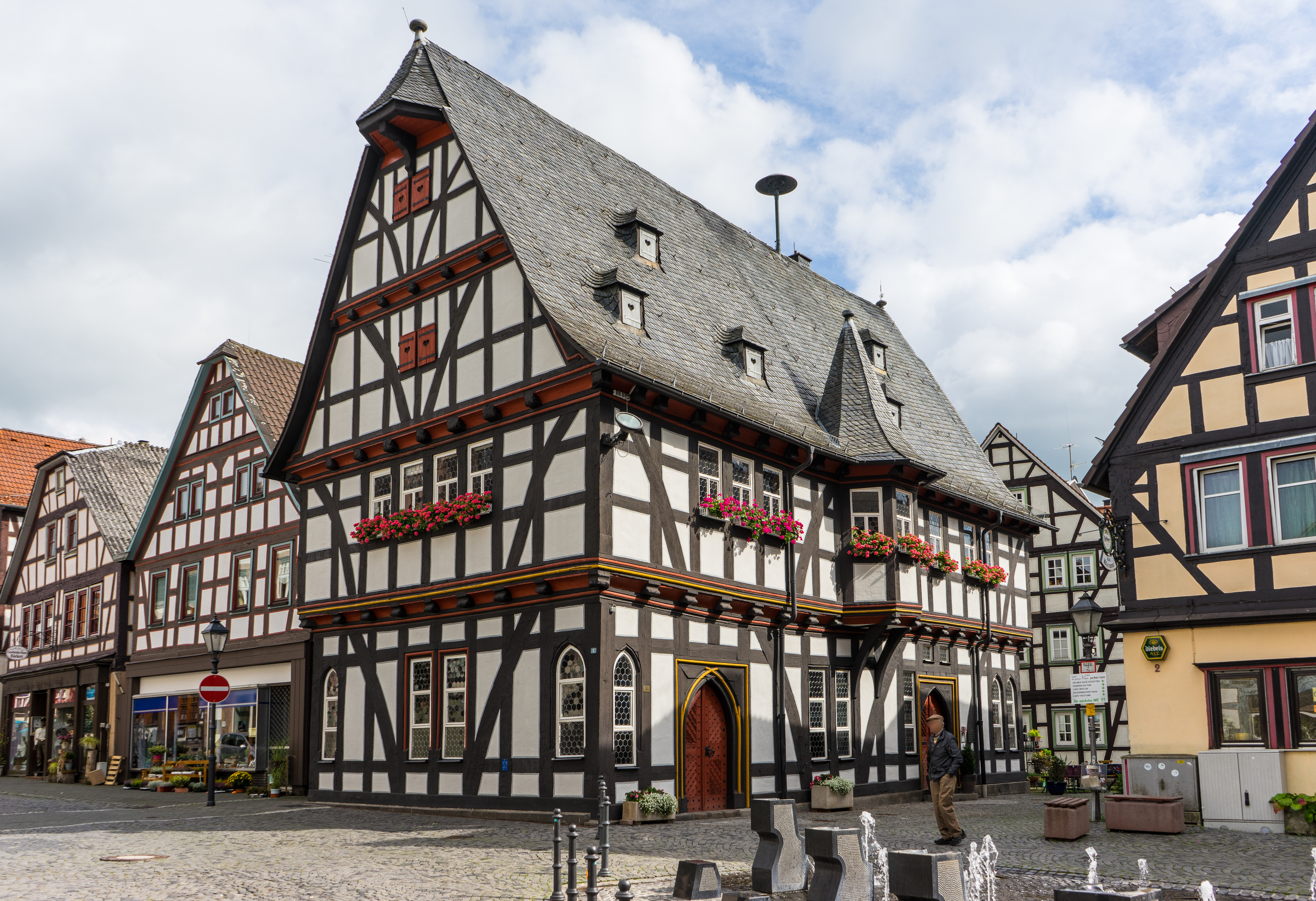
Oldtown Schotten, former town hall

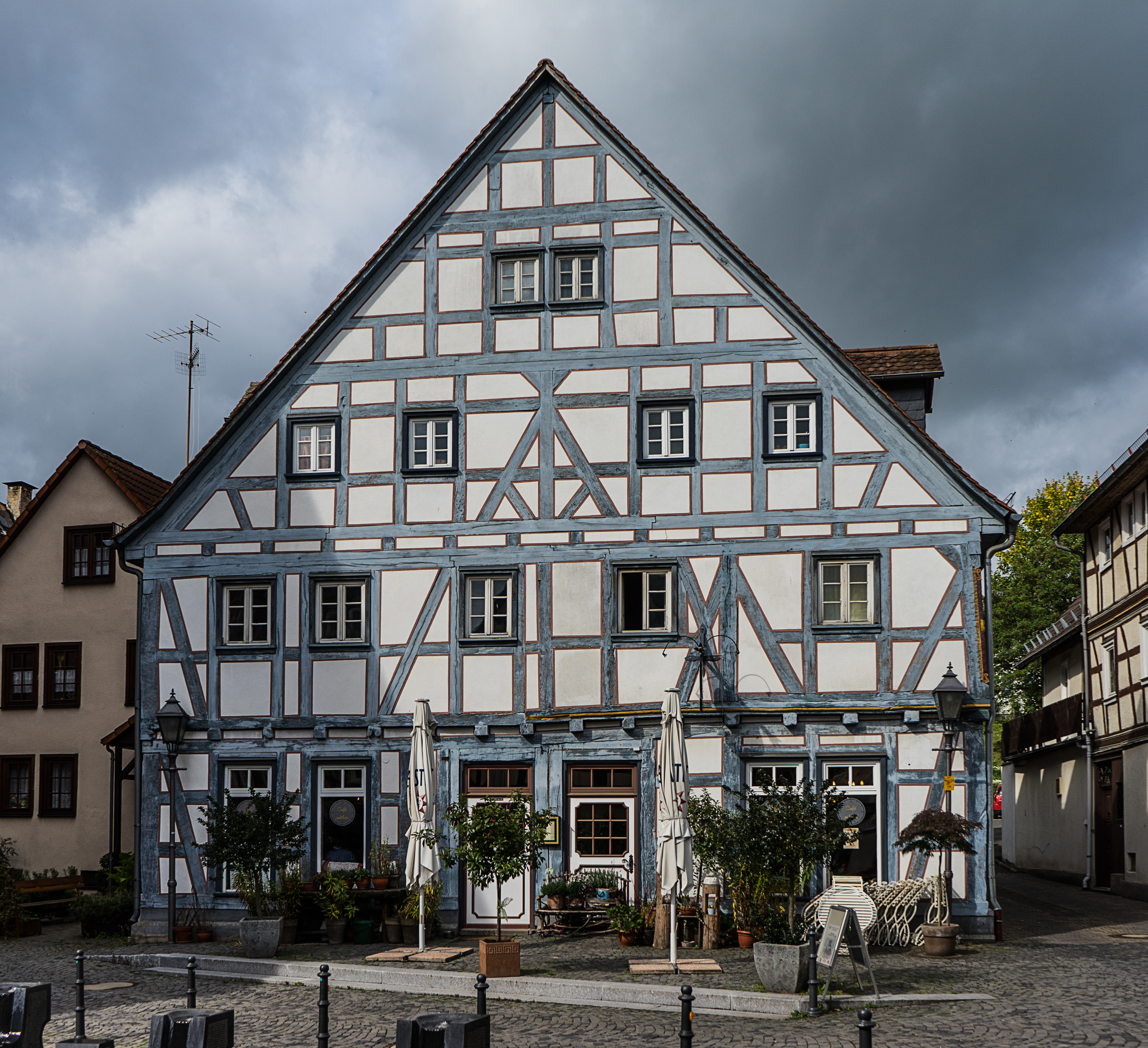
Oldtown Schotten

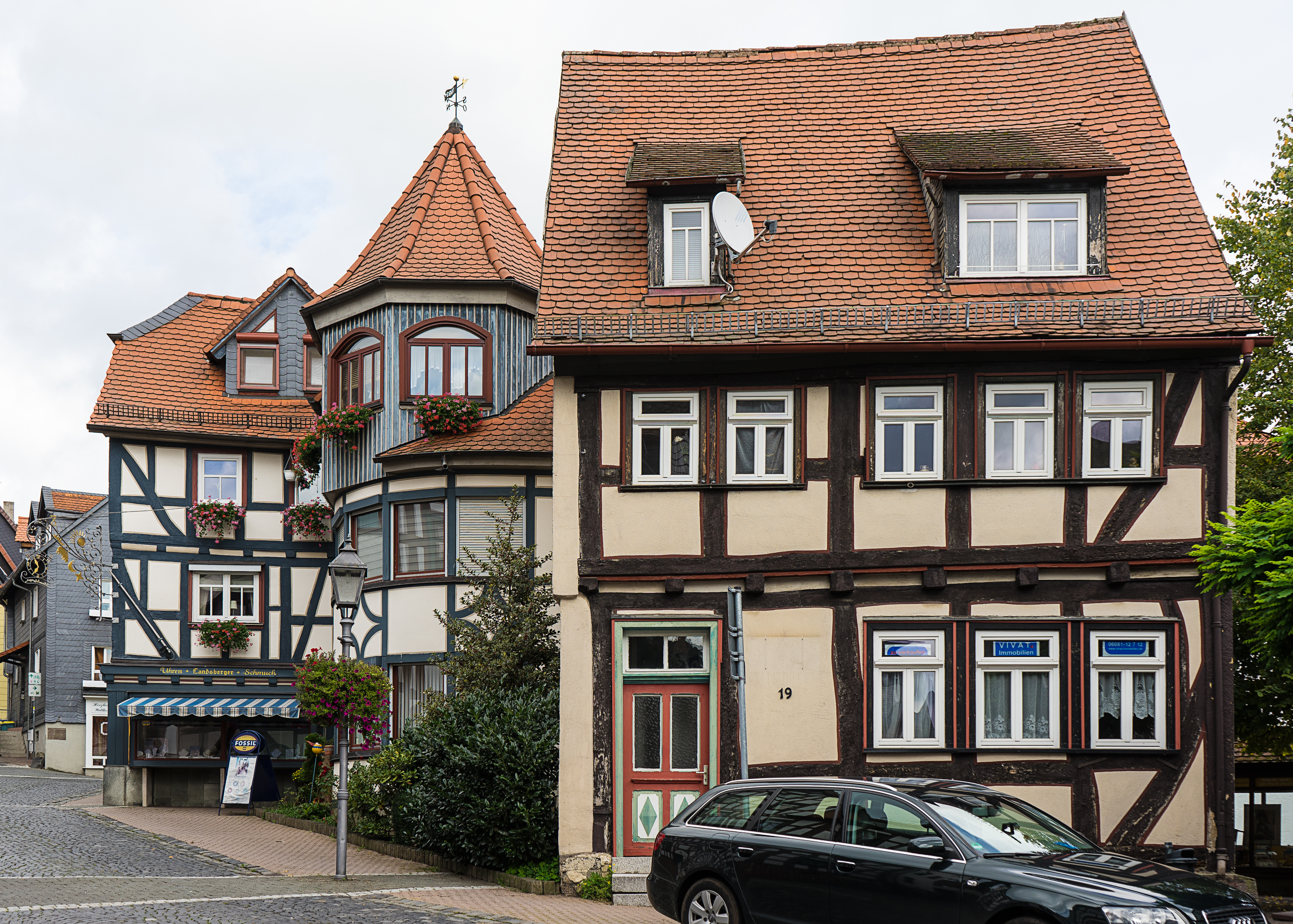
Oldtown Schotten
