= Hartfield Academy =

Independent school in Flowood, Mississippi, US

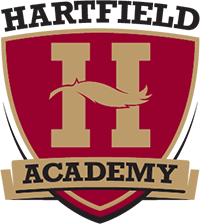

Location
- 1240 Luckney Road; Flowood, MS 39232; United States; 32.3479226°N 90.0486955°W

Information
- Type: Independent school
- Motto: To see every student fulfill their God-given purpose.
- Religious affiliation: Christianity
- Established: 2012; 14 years ago
- High School Principal: Jim Delaughter
- Middle School Principal: Angela Trigg
- Head of school: David Horner
- Grades: K3–12th
- Gender: Coeducational
- Campus type: Suburban
- Colors: Garnet and gold
- Accreditations: SACS, MAIS, ACSI, SAIS
- Yearbook: The Legacy
- Website: www.hartfield.org

Hartfield Academy (or simply known as Hartfield) is an independent private school located in Rankin County, Mississippi, United States. The school fosters K3-12th grade and has two campuses, West and East. Hartfield's main west campus, located in Flowood, is home to grades 3rd–12th, and Hartfield's smaller east campus, located in Brandon, is home to grades K3–2nd.

== History ==
=== Founding ===
Hartfield Academy was formed after a merger between University Christian School, a private school in Flowood, and Pinelake Christian School, a private elementary school in Brandon, in 2012. Before the merger, University Christian School was also known before as Brandon Academy, founded in July 1970 in Brandon, Mississippi, and in August 1990, the name changed from Brandon Academy to University Christian School when the school was moved to a nearby location in Flowood, Mississippi.

Before the school opened its doors, the school went through a transition phase, which the west campus, formerly University Christian School, moved away from its former school identity. After a substantial change in identity, Hartfield opened in August 2012. The school was renovated to adopt its new identity. The mascot was changed to 'Hugo the Hawk' and the colors to garnet and gold.

=== Major expansion ===
Hartfield Academy's main west campus was relatively small. The school administration and its Board of Trustees planned a new 45,000-square foot addition, which cost around $9.1 million. The school ran a capital campaign, Undeniably Different, for the expansion efforts, which raised nearly $4.5 million, and the expansion included new interactive classrooms, high school administrative offices, IT Help Center, Thomas W. Colbert Theater, a main plaza, Cockrell Administrative Offices, a redesigned dining hall, new athletic equipment, a basketball practice gym, and three labs. Construction began in the summer 2018 and finished before August 2019.

== Academics ==
In 2016, Hartfield and Belhaven University signed an agreement to provide dual-enrollment credit for advanced Hartfield students.

Hartfield provides programs for both advanced and struggling students. The REACH program gives students extra time on major and minor grades, as well as differently formatted tests and quizzes.

== Extracurricular activities ==
=== Athletics ===
As of 2019, Hartfield Academy provides 24 sports team ranging from junior high football to varsity baseball. These sports are run under the athletic department which sports include cheerleading, dance, football, softball, swimming, basketball, soccer, archery, baseball, track and field, cross country golf, and tennis. Hartfield Academy competes with member schools of Midsouth Association of Independent Schools.

On August 2, 2023, the MAIS Affairs Committee unanimously voted to levy sanctions against Hartfield Academy for illegal recruiting involving the football program. The MAIS banned Hartfield's football team from the 2023 Class 6A postseason, two coaches from performing their duties during games, and the school was fined $7500. Hartfield appealed the decision. On August 28, 2023, MAIS reversed the decision after finding that Hartfield was not illegally recruiting and was not violating MAIS’s recruiting rules. MAIS found that Hartfield was careless in allowing the appearance of improper recruiting and gave Hartfield a warning, placed it on probation, and issued a reduced fine. The Varsity Football Team would go on to win the State 6A Championship, going 12-0 in regular season play, winning the semifinal game, winning 21-0 in the championship game, and finishing 14-0 in the overall season.

=== Robotics Team ===
Hartfield Academy's robotics team competes in the Mississippi FIRST Tech Challenge program, which is affiliated with Center for Mathematics and Science Education (CMSE) from the University of Mississippi. In 2019, the robotics team went to FIRST Worlds Championship in Houston, Texas during the Rover Ruckus competition season when the team qualified as one of two Mississippi teams to go. Hartfield has had hosted local FIRST Tech Challenge robotics qualifiers in the past. As of September 2019, Mississippi FIRST Tech Challenge moved its kickoff event to the school as a new location for future kickoffs.

== Notable alumni ==
- London Simmons, college football defensive tackle for the Alabama Crimson Tide
