= Patrick Lindon =

Swiss industrial designer (born 1965)

Patrick Lindon (born 1965) is a Swiss industrial designer best known for his Business Class seating and cabin interiors for Swiss International Air Lines. He began designing and building furniture in 1980 and opened his design office in 1983. He has been producing his own line of modular furniture since 1998. The ‘T71 System’ is sold worldwide and is part of the collection at the Museum of Design Zurich.

Swiss International Air Lines has been flying Business Class Seating and Cabin Interiors designed by Patrick Lindon Industrial Design since 2001. The most recent seating and interior design was unveiled in May 2008. The new Business Class seats are fully reclinable, with a two meter long bed. The staggered arrangement of seats, known as the Thompson Vantage configuration, is a world premiere and offers a high degree of privacy and mobility within the aircraft cabin. The seating has been installed on all of Swiss' long-haul fleet.

In 2011, Swiss won the Business Traveller Award for ‘Best Airline for Europe’ for the fifth consecutive year, as well as ‘Best Airline for North & South America’ and ‘Best Business Class’.

From invention, design development, right through the final production of the Vantage Business Class seat, Patrick Lindon been in close collaboration with James Thompson from Thompson Aero Seating. A research and development, engineering and patent holding company, Thompson Aero Seating is based in Portadown in County Armagh, Northern Ireland. They are best known for their space-saving airline seating design. In February 2011, Thompson’s opened their first seat manufacturing and assembly plant. The improved Thompson Vantage seats will be completed by the end of 2011.

Patrick Lindon Industrial Design is based in Walchwil, Switzerland, with offices in Zurich, Basel and London.

== Publications ==
- Sweet Dreams – Moods and Interpretations in Aircraft Interiors. Karo Publishing, Basel 2011
- Time to Care. Victorinox, Ibach-Schwyz 2011
- Aircraft Interiors: The Basics. Karo Publishing, Basel 2009
- The Making of a Business Class Seat. Karo Publishing, Basel 2007, ISBN 3-9521009-6-X
- Aircraft Interiors. Daab Publishers, Cologne 2005, ISBN 3-937718-10-9
- Young European Designers. Daab Publishers, Cologne 2005, ISBN 3-937718-42-7
- Airworld. Vitra Design Museum, Weil am Rhein 2004, ISBN 3-931936-48-1
- Swiss Furniture and Interiors in the 20th Century. Birkhäuser Publishers, Basel 2002, ISBN 3-7643-6483-1
