= DeLundon =

American rapper

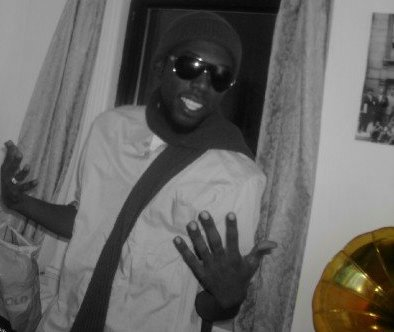
- DeLundon at Howard University in 2007

Background information
- Born: DeLundon Jimel Spearman; July 10, 1987 (age 38); Chicago, Illinois, U.S.
- Genres: Hip-hop
- Occupations: Rapper, record producer
- Years active: 2004–present
- Label: DeLu3.0LLC

DeLundon (born DeLundon Jimel Spearman on July 10, 1987 in Chicago, Illinois), also known as D-Lo, the D.L.O. and Hollywood Nicky is a hip hop recording artist, record producer and owner/founder of DeLu3.0LLC. DeLundon released a full-length studio album called The Demonstration in 2007. DeLundon will release a new album late 2010 via Tunecore. Styled as the arch villain of hip hop. DeLundon expresses Intrigue with the duality of good in evil; he lyrically weaves these themes in his music with a distinct delivery. As a producer he describes his music as out of body. His production style is equivalent to a 2012 version of Phil Spector. Experimenting with multiple unrelated abstract mediums and fusing them together to create a hip-hop wall of sound. In early 2012 DeLundon teamed up with Chicago producer Angelbeatz, to form the hip hop group, Angel/DeLundon, and the corresponding music group: Angelbeatz/DeLu3.0.

== Discography ==
- In Black and White - 2004 (unreleased)
- The Demonstration - 2007
- DeLundon - 2011
- Baker's Street w/Angelbeatz-2012
- Convert or Die w/Angelbeatz- 2013
