= Samuel Schotten =

Shmuel Schotten HaCohen (1644 – 1 July 1719), known as the Mharsheishoch, became Rabbi of the Grand Duchy of Hesse-Darmstadt in west Germany in 1685.

== Life and work ==
Shmuel (Samuel) Schotten HaCohen was born in Schotten in 1644 and moved to Frankfurt am Main in 1682. That year, he was granted the right to live in Frankfurt under the Frankfurt residence code. His brother, a clothing and drapery merchant, had moved to Frankfurt one year before.

In 1685, Schotten HaCohen was appointed dean of the zur Klause yeshiva in Frankfurt and Rabbi of the Landgraviate of Hesse-Darmstadt. For two years starting 1703, when there was no chief rabbi of Frankfurt, he served as acting head rabbi of the city. During the laying of the foundation stone for the new synagogue following the fire that had ravaged Frankfurt's Jewish ghetto in 1711, Schotten HaCohen recited prayers he had composed in Hebrew. In 1715, he instructed community members to wear simple dress and limit their spending on festivals.t

In 1711, Schotten HaCohen wrote a commentary on several passages of the Talmud entitled "Kos ha-Yeshu'os" ("The Chalice of Salvation"). It is also known as Mharsheishoch, an abbreviation MHSSC: "Moreinu Harav Shmuel Schotten Cohen." He was regarded as the leading Frankfurt Talmud scholar of his day, writing in a clear and lucid style.

He died on July 1, 1719 (14 Tamuz 5479 on the Hebrew calendar) in Frankfurt.

== Descendants ==
Rabbi Shmuel was the maternal grandfather of the Chasam Sofer's father Shmuel. He was also the great great grandfather of Rabbi Chanokh Heynekh of Aleksander's mother, Sara Chana Szatan. Several of his descendants subsequently moved to Amsterdam.
