= James Thompson (designer) =

Northern Irish inventor (born 1966)

James Thompson (born 1966 in Newry, Northern Ireland) is a Northern Irish patent holder known for his innovative research and development in airline seating. Thompson holds over twenty patents, most of which have been brought into production. He is best known for his staggered seating design which increases comfort and aircraft capacity.

== Background ==
Thompson lives in the small coastal town of Kilkeel in County Down. He is founder of Thompson Aero Seating (formerly Thompson Solutions), which specialises in the design and engineering of aircraft seating. He retired in March 2014 after selling all his shares in Thompson Aero Seating, which has been part of AVIC Cabin Systems since 2016.

== Work ==
In 2003, Thompson began developing a lie flat business class seat called Vantage which is a fully horizontal flat bed. This design offers no loss of seats compared to the old "lie flat at an angle" style seating. The seating layout, also known as the Thompson Vantage configuration, is staggered, row by row, and implements a wide console which is the footwell for the passenger behind.

In February 2008, Delta Air Lines announced that they would be installing the Vantage sleeper suite product designed by Thompson on their Boeing 767-400ER aircraft, engineered and manufactured by Contour Premium Aircraft Seating in a multi-million pound deal with Thompson Aero Seating. Delta later announced that they would also install the Vantage on their 767-300ER fleet, which is scheduled for completion in 2013. More recently Thompson Aero Seating secured deals for the Vantage seat with some of the world's largest airlines on various aircraft types, including Qantas (Airbus A330), American Airlines (Boeing 767-300), Air Canada (Boeing 777) and Etihad Airways.

Thompson's long-awaited Cozy Suite has passed its 16G H.I.C. Development Test and after having conducted a number of customer comfort trials, Cozy Suite has been ready to enter service in 2011 although no airlines have purchased the seat to date leading to the company ceasing development of the seat type. The Cozy Suite economy seat offers a distinct horizontally stepped seating layout which eases egress, provides a shoulder width as wide as business class, a dedicated sleeping area and more legroom.

In March 2014, Thompson sold all his shares in Thompson Aero Seating and left the company. His shares were purchased by co-owner Sam Rusk.

== Thompson Aero Seating customers ==
Customers of Thompson Aero Seating, all of which have bought the Vantage business class seat, include Contour Premium Aircraft Seating, as well as All Nippon Airways, Delta Air Lines, Swiss International Air Lines, Austrian Airlines, Brussels Airlines, American Airlines, JetBlue, Edelweiss Air, Air Canada, Air Astana, Qantas, Finnair, Oman Air, Malaysia Airlines, SAS Scandinavian Airlines, Aer Lingus, Philippine Airlines, and SriLankan Airlines.
