= Ric Steel =

American singer-songwriter

Sir Ric Steel
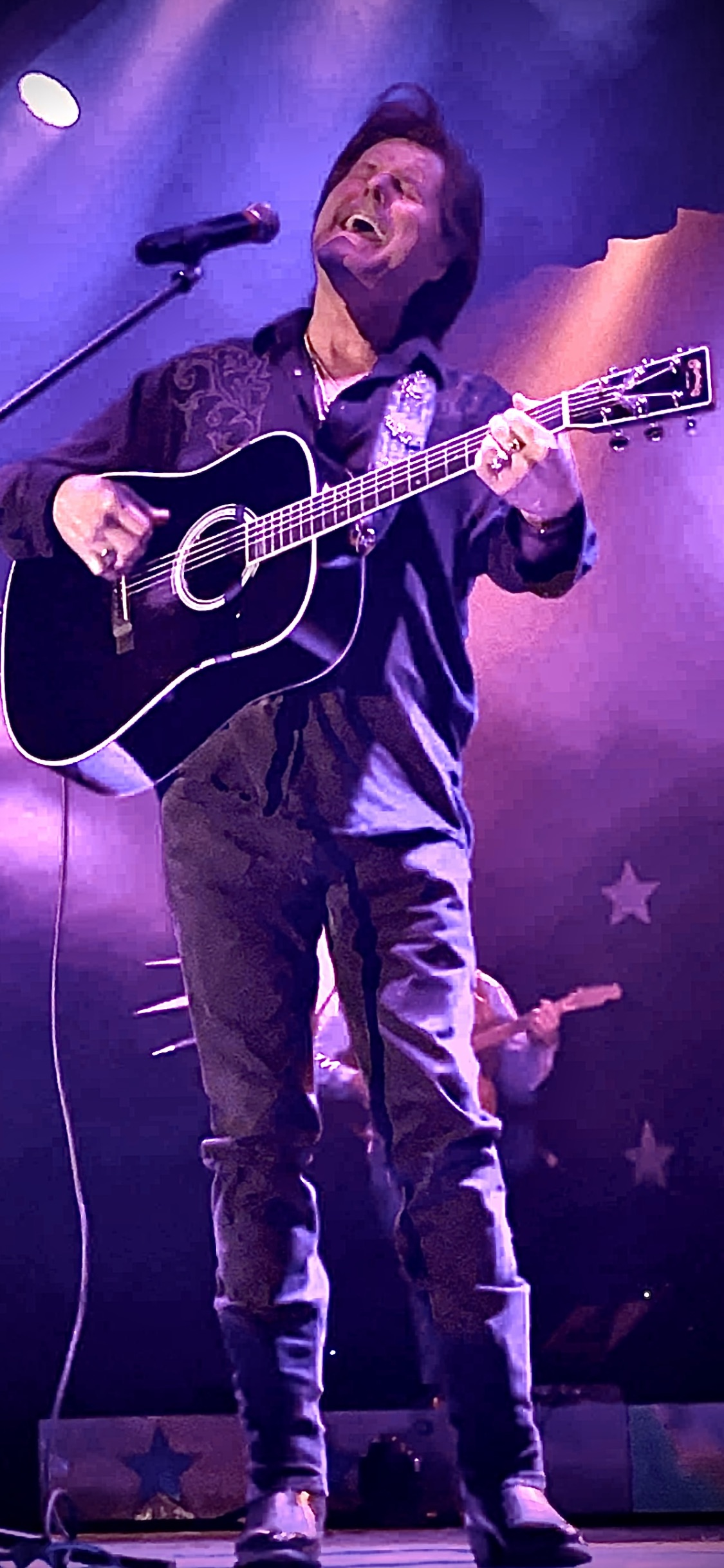

Background information
- Born: 2 December 1952 (age 73); Jackson, Mississippi, U.S.
- Origin: Memphis
- Genres: Country music
- Occupations: Singer, guitarist, novelist, song writer with major cuts and awards.
- Instrument: Acoustic
- Years active: 1962–present
- Label: Bmi. Panache.
- Website: http://www.RicSteel.com

Ric Steel (born 2 December 1952) is a Tennessee-based singer, guitarist, author, and patent holding inventor.

== Early life ==
Born to traveling musicians, Ric hails from Jackson, Mississippi. At age 10, he began singing professionally as the lead in an operatic performance by Gian Carlo Menotti called "Amahl and the Night Visitors." At 11 years of age he moved with his family to New York, and performed at the New York World's Fair for two years. After that, he went to Belmont College, and it was there in Nashville where he got to perform his music, write for The Oak Ridge Boys, and perform with some of the greatest Nashville stars. Those artists associated with Ric are listed in his biographical information. His most recent major cut as a writer was by Lee Greenwood on the "Wounded Heart" album. The song was called "Who’s that knocking on my heart?“ and "God Bless The USA" was featured on the same disc.

Over his lifetime, Ric has spent 40 years as an accredited, Bmi writer and award winner. Some of his awards include a gold medal from the country of Germany as the best country singer, and an honorable mention in the John Lennon Songwriting Contest. His song, "Love, Work & Money" was also nominated for a Grammy to the New York, Grammy committee but never made it to the Grammy awards televised show as it did not have enough votes country wide to attain that honor.

According to Nashville publishers, Ric is still writing every day and touring the world nine months a year as a featured artist. As of 2026, he frequently performs on cruise ships such as The Enchanted Princess.

== Musical career ==
Steel has had two Billboard charted singles, including "The Radio Song" at #57 and "Whose Baby Are You" at #59.
