= London Simmons =

American football player (born 2006)

No. 90 – Alabama Crimson Tide
- Position: Defensive tackle
- Class: Freshman

Personal information
- Born: November 8, 2006 (age 19)
- Listed height: 6 ft 3 in (1.91 m)
- Listed weight: 303 lb (137 kg)

Career information
- High school: Hartfield Academy (Flowood, Mississippi)
- College: Alabama (2025–present)
- Stats at ESPN

London Simmons (born November 8, 2006) is an American college football defensive tackle for the Alabama Crimson Tide.

== Career ==
Simmons attended Hartfield Academy in Flowood, Mississippi. He committed to the University of Alabama to play college football.

Simmons earned early playing time his true freshman year at Alabama in 2025.
