= Susan M. Landon =

American petroleum geologist

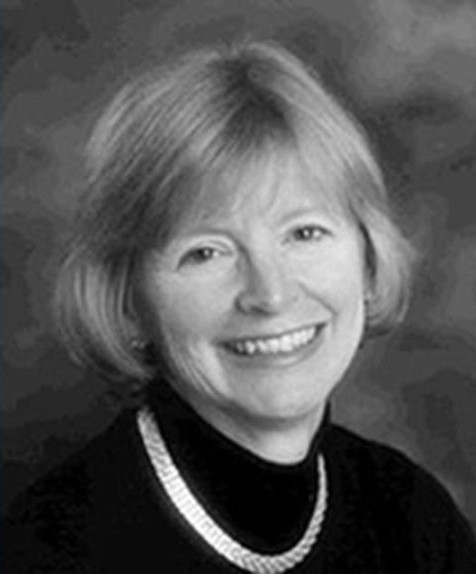
- Landon in 2001
- Born: 1950 (age 75–76)
- Occupation: Petroleum geologist
- Known for: Past president, American Geological Institute (1999)
- Board member of: Rocky Mountain Association of Geologists, American Association of Petroleum Geologists

Academic background
- Education: Knox College, Binghamton University

Academic work
- Discipline: Geology
- Sub-discipline: Petroleum geology
- Notable works: Interior Rift Basins

Susan M. Landon (born 1950) is an American petroleum geologist who worked for several major geological companies and held leadership roles in several professional societies, including serving as president of the American Geological Institute in the 1990s. Her professional career stretched over 25 years, and she obtained multiple awards for her work. Landon was an advocate for women in science and highlighted the opportunities available for female geologists.

She is the recipient of 2013 John D. Haun Landmark Publication Award from American Association of Petroleum Geologists.

== Early life and education ==
Susan M. Landon was born in Mattoon, Illinois on July 2, 1950. She received her bachelor's degree of arts in geology from Knox College in Galesburg, Illinois. Landon proceeded to study at the State University of New York in the city of Binghamton, New York, where she received her Master of Arts in geology. After finishing post-secondary education, Landon began her professional Petroleum Geologist career as an exploration geologist in 1974 at Amoco Production in Denver, Colorado.

== Career ==
=== Occupation ===
Before becoming a certified petroleum geologist, Landon began her professional life as an exploration geologist in oil and natural gas research and progression in 1974. Her work was concentrated in the Western Hemisphere, with her main regions of analysis being Alaska, Basin and Range, and the Rocky Mountains. In 1975, Landon first joined the American Association of Petroleum Geologists (AAPG); her position led her to a career with Amoco Production as an exploration training manager where she further progressed her skills.

From 1979 to 1982, Landon served terms in association with the non-profit organization Rocky Mountain Association of Geology (RMAG). While advancing in her career, Landon was an independent consultant for five years before becoming a member of the House of Delegates in 1995. In 1998, she served as the President of the American Geoscience Institute. Continuing on from 1988 through 1993, she served in Houston, and in 2000 she served a year as vice-chair.

Once retired, Landon went on to teach engineers about petroleum geology in countries like South Africa and the United States.

=== Geological contributions ===
During her career, Landon predominantly worked in the Western Hemisphere where she furthered the 1970s-1980s advancing geological industry. Her main contributions during this time involved research on oil and natural gas research and progression. She was a primary member of the American Association of Petroleum Geologists (AAPG); her work also extended to the American Geological Institute, and the American Institute of Professional Geologists.

Most notably, in 1987, Landon was a key catalyst in Amoco's drilling of a 17,851-foot test which allowed the assessment of the Precambrian Midcontinent Rift.

Landon's contributions extended beyond geological science; she continually advocated for women in the scientific community throughout her career. In an interview, Landon said, "My only advice to a woman who is interested in petroleum geology is that there are tremendous opportunities. I may have gotten my job because I was a woman, but I didn't keep my job because I was a woman. And I haven't been successful in my career because I'm a woman".

== Awards and achievements ==
Between 1975 and 2001, Landon obtained many achievements and won multiple awards as a professional petroleum geologist.

Landon's Achievements:

- 1975 - Became an official member of the American Association of Petroleum Geologists (AAPG) where she became a certified Petroleum Geologist
- 1985 - 1986 - Became a member of the Select Committee on the Future of Petroleum Geologists
- 1990 - Became an independent consultant in Denver Colorado after leaving Amoco Production
- 1991 - 1992 - Became a member of the American Association of Petroleum Geologists (AAPG) advisory council
- 1994 - Edited and published the book "Interior Rift Basins" from the American Association of Petroleum Geologists
- 1994 - 1996 - Was elected by members of the AAPG to become the AAPG's treasurer
- 1992 - 1997 - Served as chairman of the Committee on Earth Resources at the National Research Council
- 1992 - 1997 - Became a member of the Colorado Geologic Survey Advisory Committee
- 1998 - Served as president of the American Geological Institute
- 2000 - 2001 - Served as vice-chair of the Group Insurance Committee
- 2001 Recipient of AIPG's Ben H. Parker Distinguished Service Medal

== Personal life ==
In an interview, Landon spoke about her passion for giving back while working in a professional society. She communicated her positive relationship with geology and how it allowed her to make a comfortable living. Landon shared how her job provided flexibility, and allowed her to enjoy her hobbies including skiing, mountain climbing and travelling to spend time with her astronomer husband.

On February 22, 2005, Landon was in a ski accident on the slopes of Copper Mountain, and was rushed to St. Anthony's Hospital in Denver with a broken pelvis and humerus. The right side of her brain suffered a subdural hematoma, and she was diagnosed with serious internal bleeding. Two MRIs revealed a diffuse axonal injury (DAI). After 7 months, Landon was moved to Craig Hospital in Denver. On April 30, 2006, she was discharged and continued her recovery in a private home.
