= London Keyes =

American pornographic actress

- Occupation: Pornographic actress
- Years active: 2008–present
- Website: londonkeyes.com

London Keyes is an American pornographic actress.

In 2008, she began working as a stripper, which led her to come into contact with the porn industry through an acquaintance, and she subsequently launched her career as a porn actress. Keyes commented on her career in the industry as follows:

"I had good luck with it. I didn't fall into any bad traps."

– London Keyes: Mandatory.com

In 2011, Keyes was ranked 18th in Complex magazine’s list of the "50 Hottest Asian Porn Stars".

As of 2019, Keyes had, according to the Internet Adult Film Database, appeared in 615 porn films.

She appeared in a number of films directed by Jonni Darkko, until she made the film L for London, starring her in the lead role, in which she filmed her first anal sex scene with Manuel Ferrara and Asa Akira.

== Filmography (notable) ==
- Seinfeld: A XXX Parody (2009)
- Asa Akira Is Insatiable [de] (2010)
- Jailhouse Heat [de] (2011)
- Gangbanged 3 [de] (2012)
- This Ain't The Expendables XXX [de] (2012)
- DP Me Vol. 2 [de] (2014)

== Awards ==
According to the Internet Adult Film Database

=== AVN Awards ===
- 2010 Nominee: Best New Starlet
- 2012 Nominee: Best Oral Sex Scene, L for London (2011)
- 2013 Nominee: Best Double Penetration Sex Scene, Sexual Tension: Raw and Uncut (2012)
- 2015 Nominee: Fan Award: Hottest Ass
- 2016 Nominee: Best Oral Sex Scene, Fluid 3 (2015)
- 2016: Nominee: Fan Award: Best Boobs

=== Sex Awards ===
- 2013 Nominee: Porn Star of the Year

=== Urban X Awards ===
- 2012 Nominee: Best Anal Sex Scene, Kelly Divine Is Buttwoman (2011)
- 2012 Nominee: Best Anal Sex Scene, L for London (2011)
- 2012 Nominee: Best Couple Scene, L for London (2011)
- 2012 Nominee: Best Three Way Scene, Jynx Maze Is a Sex Addict (2011)
- 2012 Nominee: Orgasmic Oralist of the Year

=== XBIZ Awards ===
- 2013 Nominee: Best Scene – Gonzo/Non-Feature Release, Sexual Tension: Raw and Uncut (2012)
- 2014 Nominee: Best Scene – All-Girl, Backdoor to London (2013)
- 2016 Nominee: Best Scene – All-Girl, Spontaneass 2 (2014)
- 2010 AVN Award for Best New Starlet (nominated)
- 2011 XBIZ Award for Web Babe of the Year (nominated)
- 2012 AVN Award for Best Oral Sex en L for London (nominated)
