= John Landon (Michigan politician) =

American politician

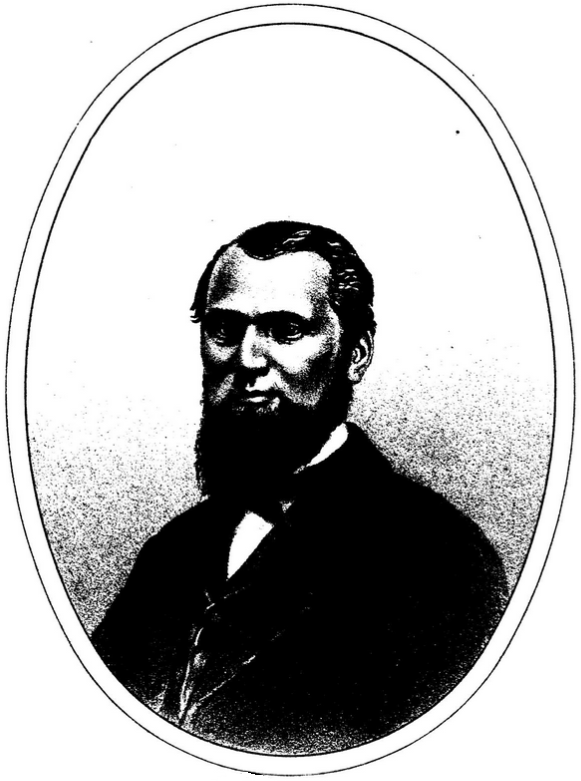

Member of the Michigan House of Representatives from the Jackson County 3rd district
- In office January 1, 1865 – December 31, 1866
- Preceded by: Richard J. Crego
- Succeeded by: William G. Brown
- In office January 1, 1871 – March 13, 1871
- Preceded by: Levi N. Goodrich
- Succeeded by: Hiram C. Hodge

Personal details
- Born: November 9, 1833 Cayuga County, New York, US
- Died: March 13, 1871 (aged 37) Springport, Michigan, US
- Party: Republican

John Landon (November 9, 1833 – March 13, 1871) was a Michigan politician.

== Early life ==
John Landon was born on November 9, 1833 in Cayuga County, New York to Hermon (also spelled Harmon) and Betsey Landon. John, along with his father's family, moved to Springport, Michigan in 1835.

== Career and death ==
On November 8, 1864, Landon was elected to the Michigan House of Representatives where he represented the Jackson County 3rd district from January 4, 1865 to December 31, 1866. On November 4, 1870, Landon was again elected to the state house where he represented the same district until his death in office on March 13, 1871. Landon was interred at Campbell Cemetery in Parma, Michigan. His funeral was attended by eight fellow representatives who served as pallbearers. Also attending his funeral was the clerk of the state house, and the speaker of the state house, Jonathan J. Woodman.
