= Lara Landon =

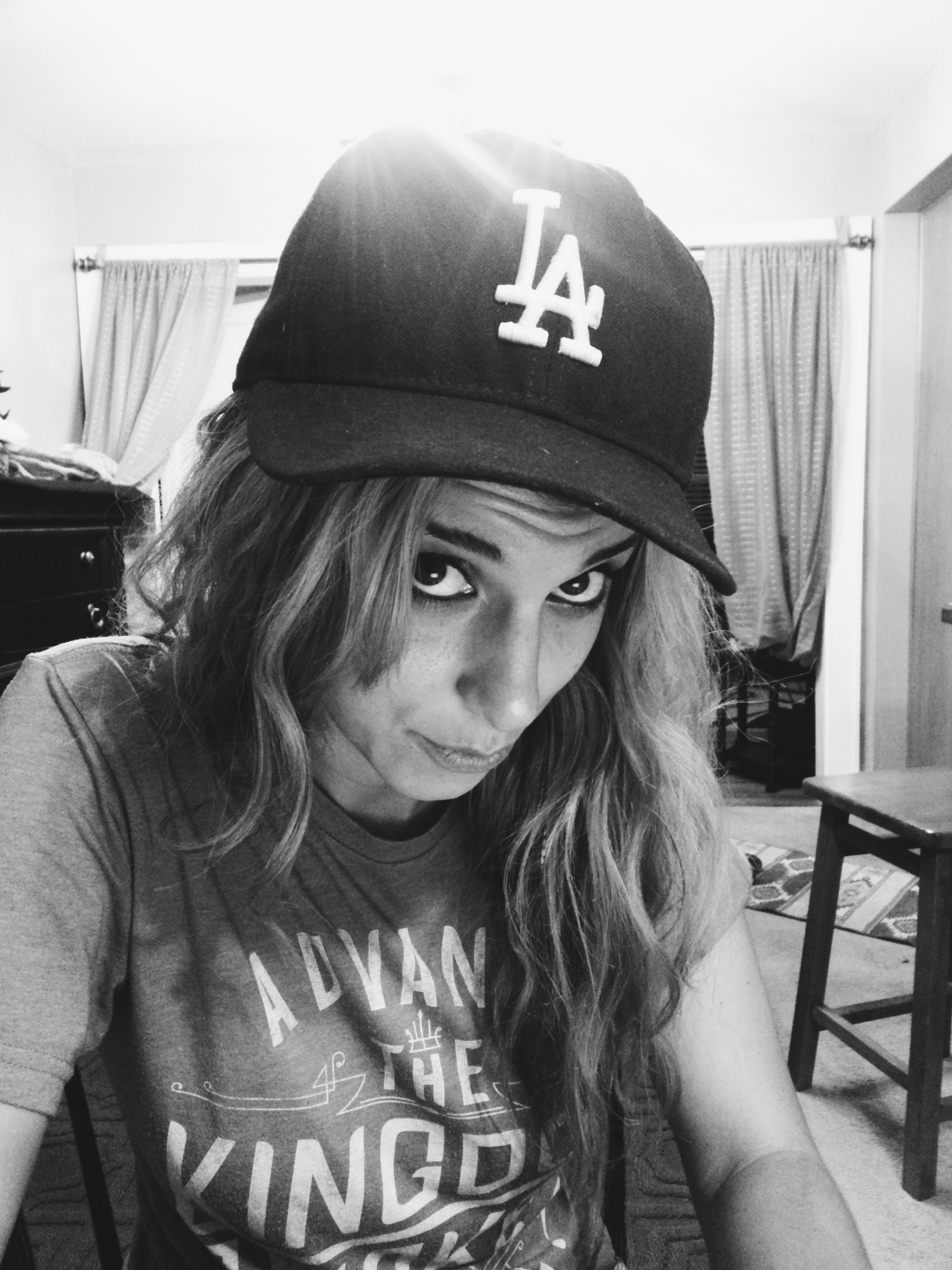
- Lara Landon (2014)

Background information
- Origin: Nashville, Tennessee
- Genres: Worship, CCM, folk, soul
- Occupations: Singer, songwriter
- Instruments: vocals, singer-songwriter
- Years active: 2008–present

Laura Landon (stage name) started her music career in 2008, by signing with Whiplash Records while attending Belmont University in Nashville. She has released six studio albums, Beloved, "Love/Majestic", Overcome, "Christmas", There Is Grace and "The Never Again". The single "Closer" charted on the Billboard magazine Christian Songs chart. The fan funded and self produced album "Overcome" was named one of the top 12 Christian albums of the year by iTunes.

== Music career ==
Albums

Her music recording career commenced in 2008, with the studio album, Beloved, that was released on September 22, 2009, with Bemamedia and Whiplash Records. The subsequent studio album, Overcome, was released on May 1, 2012, by Wise Sam Records. She released, There Is Grace, on September 9, 2014, from The Fuel Music. Landon released a compilation album of greatest hits, The Best of Me, on February 19, 2016.

EPs

She has released two extended plays, the first, Love/Majestic, was released in 2011. Her subsequent EP, Christmas, was released on December 4, 2012.

Songs

The song, "Closer", on her first album, charted on the Billboard magazine charts, where it peaked at No. 36 on the Christian Songs chart. Her song, "I See God In You", was covered by New Release Today in a Behind the Song feature. Another song, "Defenseless", was written about in a Behind the Song feature from New Release Today.

== Discography ==
Studio albums

- Beloved (September 22, 2009)
- Love/Majestic (2011)
- Overcome (May 1, 2012)
- There Is Grace (September 9, 2014)
- Christmas (2012)
- "There Is Grace" (2014)
- "The Never Again" (2017)

Compilation albums

- The Best of Me (February 19, 2016)
- "New Frontiers" (2012)
