= McLendon =

McLendon is an American surname. Notable people with the surname include:

- George McLendon (born 1952), American chemist
- Gordon McLendon (1921–1986), American radio pioneer
- James A. McLendon, American politician
- John McLendon (1915–1999), American basketball coach
- Mac McLendon (1945–2022), American golfer
- Mary Latimer McLendon (1840–1921), American activist
- Mary Stone McLendon (1896–1967), Native American musician, storyteller, humanitarian, and educator
- Matthew McLendon (born 1977), American museum director, art historian, and curator of modern and contemporary art
- Michael McLendon (born 1963), American politician
- Robert McLendon (1936–2022), American politician
- Robert L. McLendon, Jr., American academic
- Steve McLendon (born 1986), American football player
- T. A. McLendon (born 1984), American football player
- T. K. McLendon (born 1999), American professional football defensive end
- Wendi McLendon-Covey (born 1969), American actor, writer, and comedian
- Winzola McLendon (1910–2012), American journalist and author

== See also ==
- McLendon-Chisholm, Texas, city in the United States
- McLendon–McDougald Gymnasium, sports venue in North Carolina, United States
