= Charles Landon (cricketer) =

English cricketer (1850–1903)

Charles Whittington Landon (30 May 1850 – 5 March 1903) was an English amateur first-class cricketer, who played six games for Lancashire County Cricket Club in 1874 and 1875, and nine for Yorkshire between 1878 and 1882. Having first played for the Lancashire Gentlemen, he also appeared for the Yorkshire Gentlemen from 1876 to 1902, putting on 271 with A.D. Dickson on one occasion.

Born in Bromley, Kent, England, the son of the chaplain at Bromley College, he was educated at Bromsgrove School and appeared for their first XI in 1866 and 1867. Standing just over 5 feet 9 inches (1.75 m) and weighing almost 12 stone (170 lb; 76 kg), he was a right-handed batsman and a right-round-arm bowler with an eccentric action. Bowling against the Australians in 1882, a contemporary report said "the amateur's delivery was very curious and caused a great deal of laughter". He was reputed to be a brilliant field at cover-point.

He played in four matches for Lancashire in 1874. Moving to Yorkshire he played for his adopted county from 1878 to 1882 without much success. He had the misfortune to be bowled for 0 in eight consecutive innings against George Freeman, but scored 72 on the ninth occasion in a non first-class game. In 1879, he took 119 wickets for the Gentlemen of Yorkshire but, in his first-class cricket only two wickets at 71.50 each. In fifteen first-class matches in all, he scored 172 runs at 7.27, and took eight catches.

Landon died on 5 March 1903 in Ledston, Yorkshire, at the age of 52.
