= All-American Bowl (high school football) =

Annual high school football all-star game held in San Antonio, Texas

- Navy All-American Bowl
- Stadium: Alamodome
- Location: San Antonio, Texas
- Operated: 2000–present

Sponsors
- U.S. Army (2000–2018); American Family Insurance (2019–2024); U.S. Navy (2025–present)

The All-American Bowl (branded as the Navy All-American Bowl for sponsorship reasons) is a high school football all-star game, held annually at the Alamodome in San Antonio, Texas. Typically played in January, the All-American Bowl is played between all-star teams representing the eastern and western United States.

Seventeen All-Americans have been Heisman Trophy finalists, with over 450 later playing in the National Football League. Notable alumni include Andrew Luck, Adrian Peterson, Odell Beckham Jr., Eric Berry, Tim Tebow, Joe Thomas, Tyron Smith, Robert Quinn, C. J. Mosley, DeMarco Murray, and Chase Young.

The All-American Bowl was previously organized by All-American Games; in 2019, NBC Sports announced it had acquired the game and its assets.

== History ==
The All-American Bowl is an annual high school football all-star game. The All-American Bowl is usually played in January between all-star teams representing the eastern and western United States.

The First All-American High School Football game, held on June 25, 1994, at J. Birney Crum Stadium in Allentown, Pennsylvania marked a significant moment in the history of high school football. The event was orchestrated by Dale Dougherty, leading to the participation of high schools nationwide.

=== Background and organization ===
Dougherty's plan culminated in a national selection process. The selected players were divided into 33-player teams, segregated into East and West squads, with the Mississippi River serving as the geographical dividing line.

=== Roster and players ===
The event featured an impressive roster, with 63 out of the top 66 high school football players nationwide committing to participate. Lamont Green, Bo Barzilauskas, Rasheed Simmons, Ryan Clement, Amp Campbell, Marcus Nash, Jason McCullough, and Dan Drogan were among the participants, each boasting remarkable achievements in their respective positions.

=== Corporate sponsorship and television coverage ===
Efforts were made to secure corporate sponsorships, offering various packages ranging from $1,000 to $10,000 to involve businesses in supporting the event. Discussions with Prime Network/Sports Channel aimed for national exposure, targeting approximately 50 million households. Television coverage was secured through WFMZ-TV, Channel 69, for local broadcasting and ESPN2 for nationwide telecast.

=== Legacy and impact ===
Dougherty's brainchild evolved from an academic project during his sports administration studies at the United States Sports Academy into a major sporting event.

The game was first played on December 30, 2000, at Highlander Stadium in Dallas. In 2002, the game was moved to San Antonio, where it is played at the Alamodome. Since the game's inception, attendance has risen from 6,300 for the inaugural game in 2000 to a record 40,568 in 2017. The United States Army served as title sponsor of the game until 2017, when it announced that it would not renew its sponsorship past the 2018 edition. American Family Insurance became the new presenting sponsor the following year, and was succeeded by the United States Navy in 2025.

NBC started broadcasting the All-American Bowl in 2004. As a result, the game became a platform for participating college prospects to announce a verbal commitment to their future university. Prior to 2019, the All-American Bowl was organized by All-American Games. On February 25, 2019, it was announced that All-American Games had sold the game to NBC Sports Group for an undisclosed "seven-figure" amount. There were plans to leverage NBC's other platforms, including NBCSN and SportsEngine (a provider of digital media services oriented towards youth and amateur sports) as part of promotion and coverage of the game. This purchase did not include other events owned by All-American Games, such as the FBU National Championships (a youth football event) and the FBU Freshman All-American Bowl–both held annually in Naples, Florida, which were sold separately to All-American Games vice-president Steve Quinn and partner Erik Richards.

The 2021 game (originally scheduled for January 9, 2021) was canceled due to the COVID-19 pandemic. In place of the game, NBC scheduled an All-American Bowl: Declaration Day special on January 2, 2021, to honor top players of the 2020 season and air commitment announcements.

== Awards ==
During the week of the game, a number of national awards are given at a formal awards dinner including:

- Ken Hall Trophy: Awarded to the nation's best high school football player and named after Ken "Sugarland Express" Hall, once the all-time leading rusher in high-school football history for more than five decades
- Bill Yoast Trophy: Awarded to the nation's top high school coach
- Glenn Davis Army Award (West) and Doc Blanchard (East) Awards: Recognizes an East and West player who best epitomizes the Army's high standard of excellence in community service, education, and athletic distinction
- Anthony Muñoz Lineman of the Year Award: Awarded to the nation's best high school offensive lineman or defensive lineman

After the conclusion of the game on Saturday afternoon, these awards are given:

- Herman Boone Trophy: Awarded annually to the winning team
- Pete Dawkins MVP Trophy
- National Coach of the Year

== Selection process ==
All-American Bowl players are chosen through a national "selection tour" and associated combine. The committee is headed by the national recruiting director, Erik Richards.

== Game records ==
| Record category | Record holder | Year | Record |
|---|---|---|---|
| Highest Attendance | 2017 | 2017 | 40,568 |
| Longest Touchdown Pass | Travis Waller to Derrius Guice | 2015 | 92 yards |
| Most Passing Yards | Spencer Rattler | 2019 | 234 yards |
| Most Passing Touchdowns | Graham Mertz | 2019 | 5 TDs |
| Most Rushing Yards | Demetrius Hart | 2011 | 100 yards (8 carries) |
| Most Rushing Touchdowns | Most Recently: Royce Freeman (tied with 3 others) | 2014 | 3 TDs |
| Most Receiving Yards | Derrius Guice | 2015 | 153 yards (2 receptions) |
| Most Points, Single Player | Most Recently: Royce Freeman (tied with 3 others) | 2014 | 18 points |
| Most Tackles | De'Anthony Thomas | 2011 | 8 tackles |
| Longest Kickoff Return TD | Ted Ginn Jr. | 2004 | 98 yards |
| Largest Margin of Victory | East over West 47–3 | 2003 | 44 points |
| Longest Field Goal | David Olano | 2023 | 50 yards |

== Game results ==
East victories are shaded ██ red. West victories shaded ██ gold.

| Date | Site | Result | Series |
|---|---|---|---|
| December 30, 2000 | Highlander Stadium • Dallas, Texas | West 18–15 | West 1–0 |
| January 5, 2002 | Alamo Stadium • San Antonio, Texas | West 26–6 | West 2–0 |
| January 5, 2003 | Alamodome • San Antonio, Texas | East 47–3 | West 2–1 |
| January 3, 2004 | Alamodome • San Antonio, Texas | East 45–28 | Tied 2–2 |
| January 15, 2005 | Alamodome • San Antonio, Texas | West 35–3 | West 3–2 |
| January 7, 2006 | Alamodome • San Antonio, Texas | East 27–16 | Tied 3–3 |
| January 6, 2007 | Alamodome • San Antonio, Texas | West 24–7 | West 4–3 |
| January 5, 2008 | Alamodome • San Antonio, Texas | East 33–23 | Tied 4–4 |
| January 3, 2009 | Alamodome • San Antonio, Texas | East 30–17 | East 5–4 |
| January 9, 2010 | Alamodome • San Antonio, Texas | West 30–14 | Tied 5–5 |
| January 8, 2011 | Alamodome • San Antonio, Texas | East 13–10 | East 6–5 |
| January 7, 2012 | Alamodome • San Antonio, Texas | West 24–12 | Tied 6–6 |
| January 5, 2013 | Alamodome • San Antonio, Texas | East 15–8 | East 7–6 |
| January 4, 2014 | Alamodome • San Antonio, Texas | West 26–8 | Tied 7–7 |
| January 3, 2015 | Alamodome • San Antonio, Texas | West 39–36 | West 8–7 |
| January 9, 2016 | Alamodome • San Antonio, Texas | West 37–9 | West 9–7 |
| January 7, 2017 | Alamodome • San Antonio, Texas | East 27–17 | West 9–8 |
| January 6, 2018 | Alamodome • San Antonio, Texas | West 17–16 | West 10–8 |
| January 5, 2019 | Alamodome • San Antonio, Texas | East 48–14 | West 10–9 |
| January 4, 2020 | Alamodome • San Antonio, Texas | West 33–20 | West 11–9 |
| January 8, 2022 | Alamodome • San Antonio, Texas | West 34–14 | West 12–9 |
| January 7, 2023 | Alamodome • San Antonio, Texas | East 55–17 | West 12–10 |
| January 6, 2024 | Alamodome • San Antonio, Texas | West 31–28 | West 13–10 |
| January 11, 2025 | Alamodome • San Antonio, Texas | West 13–7 | West 14–10 |
| January 10, 2026 | Alamodome • San Antonio, Texas | East 17–14 | West 14–11 |

== Game MVPs ==
A game MVP is announced after each year's All-American Bowl. In the past, the winner of the MVP award was given the Pete Dawkins Trophy, named for 1958 Heisman Trophy winner Pete Dawkins, but as of 2019 that award name is no longer active.

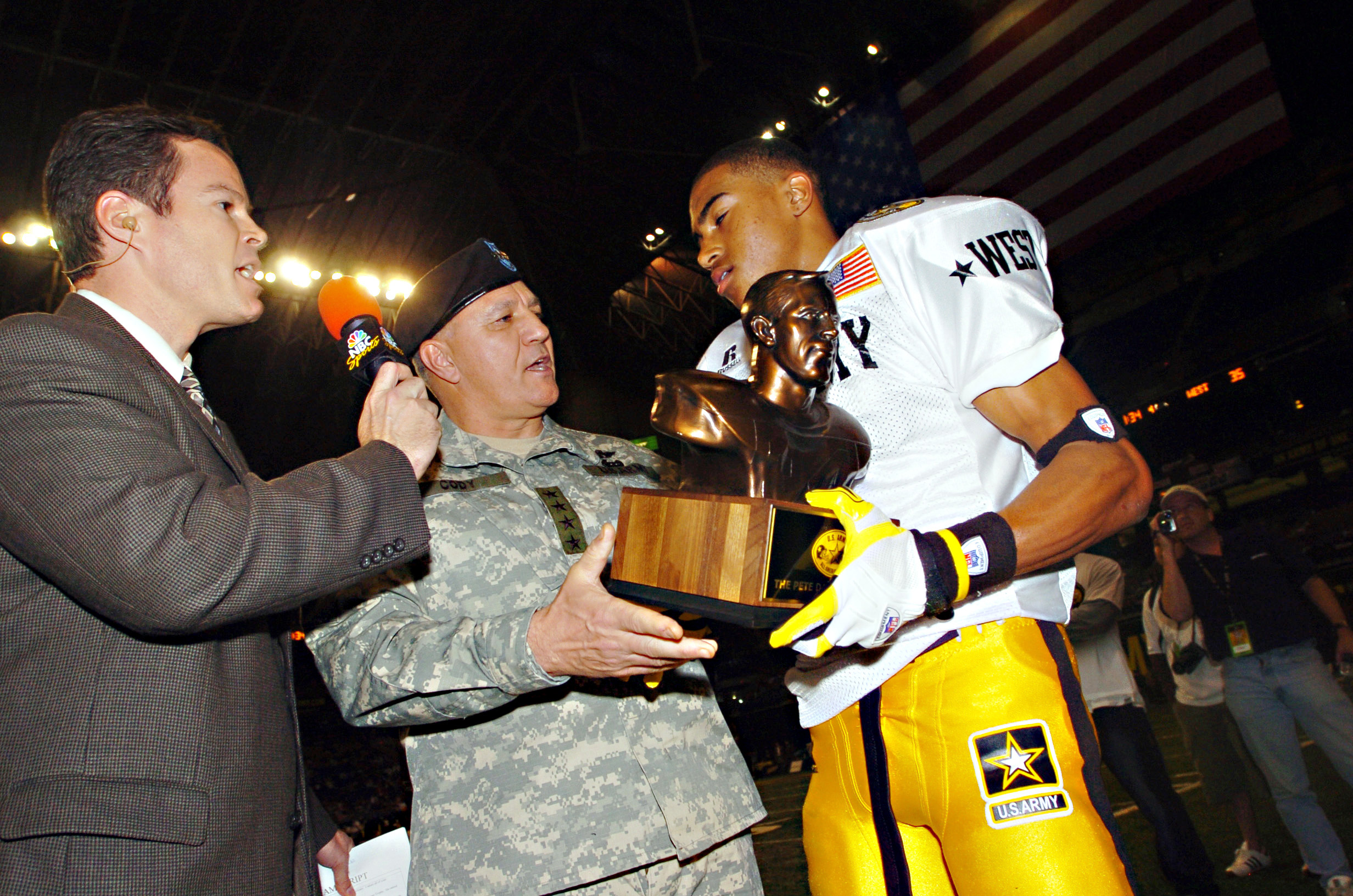
DeSean Jackson receives the Pete Dawkins Trophy from General Richard A. Cody at the 2005 All-American Bowl

| Season | Player | Position | High school | College | Ref. |
|---|---|---|---|---|---|
| 2001 | Dominic Robinson | WR | Diamond Bar | Florida State | |
| 2002 | Vince Young | QB | Madison | Texas | |
| 2003 | Chris Leak | QB | Independence | Florida | |
| 2004 | Ted Ginn Jr. | WR | Glenville | Ohio State | |
| 2005 | DeSean Jackson | WR | Long Beach | California | |
| 2006 | Beanie Wells | RB | Garfield | Ohio State | |
| 2007 | Chris Galippo | LB | Servite | USC | |
| 2008 | Terrelle Pryor | QB | Jeannette | Ohio State | |
| 2009 | Tajh Boyd | QB | Phoebus | Clemson | |
| 2009 | Bryce Brown | RB | Wichita East | Tennessee | |
| 2010 | Ronald Powell | DE | Rancho Verde | Florida | |
| 2011 | Demetrius Hart | RB | Phillips | Alabama | |
| 2011 | Demetrius Hart | RB | Phillips | Colorado State | |
| 2012 | Dorial Green-Beckham | WR | Hillcrest | Missouri | |
| 2012 | Cyler Miles | QB | Mullen | Washington | |
| 2013 | James Quick | WR | Trinity | Louisville | |
| 2014 | Joe Mixon | RB | Freedom | Oklahoma | |
| 2015 | Derrius Guice | RB | Catholic | LSU | |
| 2016 | Shea Patterson | QB | IMG | Ole Miss | |
| 2016 | Shea Patterson | QB | IMG | Michigan | |
| 2017 | Hunter Johnson | QB | Brownsburg | Clemson | |
| 2017 | Hunter Johnson | QB | Brownsburg | Northwestern | |
| 2018 | Caden Sterns | DB | Steele | Texas | |
| 2019 | Graham Mertz | QB | Blue Valley North | Wisconsin | |
| 2019 | Graham Mertz | QB | Blue Valley North | Florida | |
| 2020 | Bryce Young | QB | Mater Dei | Alabama | |
| 2022 | Rayshon Luke | RB | St. John Bosco | Arizona | |
| 2022 | Rayshon Luke | RB | St. John Bosco | Fresno State | |
| 2023 | Dante Moore | QB | Martin Luther King Jr. | UCLA | |
| 2023 | Dante Moore | QB | Martin Luther King Jr. | Oregon | |
| 2024 | Koi Perich | S | Lincoln Secondary | Minnesota | |
| 2024 | Koi Perich | S | Lincoln Secondary | Oregon | |
| 2025 | Keisean Henderson | QB | Legacy the School of Sport Sciences | Houston | |
| 2026 | Luke Wafle | DE | Hun School of Princeton | USC | |

== Notable participants ==
Seventeen All-Americans have been Heisman Trophy finalists, with over 450 later playing in the National Football League.

=== 2001 ===
East

- Chauncey Davis – Florida State
- Jason Davis – Illinois
- Trai Essex – Northwestern
- Patrick Estes – Virginia
- Dustin Fox – Ohio State
- Anttaj Hawthorne – Wisconsin
- Marlin Jackson – Michigan
- Kevin Jones – Virginia Tech
- Craphonso Thorpe – Florida State
- Leon Williams – Miami
- Pierre Woods – Michigan

West

- Lorenzo Alexander – California
- Derek Anderson – Oregon State
- Michael Clayton – LSU
- Shaun Cody – USC
- Cedric Griffin – Texas
- Tommie Harris – Oklahoma
- Derrick Johnson – Texas
- Marcus Spears – LSU
- Andrew Whitworth – LSU
- Ben Wilkerson – LSU

=== 2002 ===
East

- Jason Avant – Michigan
- Will Blackmon – Boston College
- Ahmad Brooks – Virginia
- Levi Brown – Penn State
- Thomas Clayton – Kansas State
- A.J. Davis – NC State
- James "Buster" Davis – Florida State
- Anthony Fasano – Notre Dame
- Nick Mangold – Ohio State
- Tyler Palko – Pittsburgh
- Brady Quinn – Notre Dame

West

- Haloti Ngata – Oregon
- Justin Blalock – Texas
- Kamerion Wimbley – Florida State
- Vince Young – Texas

=== 2003 ===
East

- Andre Caldwell – Florida
- Antonio Cromartie – Florida State
- Vernon Davis – Maryland
- Chris Leak – Florida
- Ryan Mundy – West Virginia
- Greg Olsen – Miami
- John Sullivan – Notre Dame
- Joe Thomas – Wisconsin
- Donte Whitner – Ohio State
- Tom Zbikowski – Notre Dame
- Shawn Crable – Michigan University

West

- Sam Baker – USC
- Tarell Brown – Texas
- Reggie Bush – USC
- John Carlson – Notre Dame
- Leon Hall – Michigan
- LenDale White – USC

=== 2004 ===
East

- Ryan Baker
- Connor Barth
- Tony Carter
- Dan Connor
- Ted Ginn Jr.
- Chad Henne
- Chris Long
- Zach Miller

West

- Early Doucet
- Adrian Peterson
- Matt Tuiasosopo
- Marcus Freeman

=== 2005 ===
East

- Brian Cushing – USC
- Rashard Mendenhall – Illini
- Zoltan Mesko
- Tony Moeaki – Iowa
- Eugene Monroe
- Michael Oher – Ole Miss
- Kenny Phillips

West

- Travis Beckum
- Martellus Bennett
- Jamaal Charles – Texas
- DeSean Jackson – California
- Rey Maualuga – USC
- David Nelson
- Mark Sanchez – USC
- Jonathan Stewart
- Ndamukong Suh – Nebraska

=== 2006 ===
East

- Matt Bosher – Miami
- Brandon Graham – Michigan
- Percy Harvin – Florida
- LeSean McCoy – Pittsburgh
- Jared Odrick – Penn State
- Myron Rolle – Florida State
- Andre Smith – Alabama
- Brandon Spikes – Florida
- C. J. Spiller – Clemson
- Tim Tebow – Florida

West

- Perrish Cox – Oklahoma State
- Kai Forbath – UCLA
- Michael Goodson – Texas A&M
- Sergio Kindle – Texas
- Taylor Mays – USC
- Gerald McCoy – Oklahoma
- DeMarco Murray – Oklahoma
- J'Marcus Webb – Texas

=== 2007 ===
East

- Arrelious Benn – Illinois
- Noel Devine – West Virginia
- Eric Berry – Tennessee
- Anthony Davis – Rutgers
- Marcus Gilchrist – Clemson
- MarQueis Gray – Minnesota
- Greg Little – North Carolina
- Stefen Wisniewski – Penn State
- Major Wright – Florida

West

- John Clay – Wisconsin
- Everson Griffen – USC
- Ryan Mallett – Michigan
- Joe McKnight – USC
- Marc Tyler – USC
- Jimmy Clausen – Notre Dame
- Chris Galippo – USC

=== 2008 ===
East

- Nigel Bradham – Florida State
- Arthur Brown – Miami
- Lerentee McCray - Florida
- Quinton Coples – North Carolina
- Kyle Long – Oregon
- Patrick Peterson – LSU
- Terrelle Pryor – Ohio State
- Robert Quinn – North Carolina
- Kyle Rudolph – Notre Dame
- Blair Walsh – Georgia

West

- Michael Floyd – Notre Dame
- Matt Kalil – USC
- Jermaine Kearse – Washington
- Andrew Luck – Stanford
- Michael Mauti – Penn State
- Rahim Moore – UCLA
- Nick Perry – USC
- Tyron Smith – USC
- Justin Tucker – Texas

=== 2009 ===
East

- Jonathan Bostic – Florida
- Bryce Brown – Tennessee
- Tajh Boyd – Clemson
- Orson Charles – Georgia
- Jarvis Jones – Georgia
- Morgan Moses – Virginia
- Zeke Motta – Notre Dame
- Aaron Murray – Georgia
- John Simon – Ohio State
- Shayne Skov – Stanford
- Logan Thomas – Virginia Tech

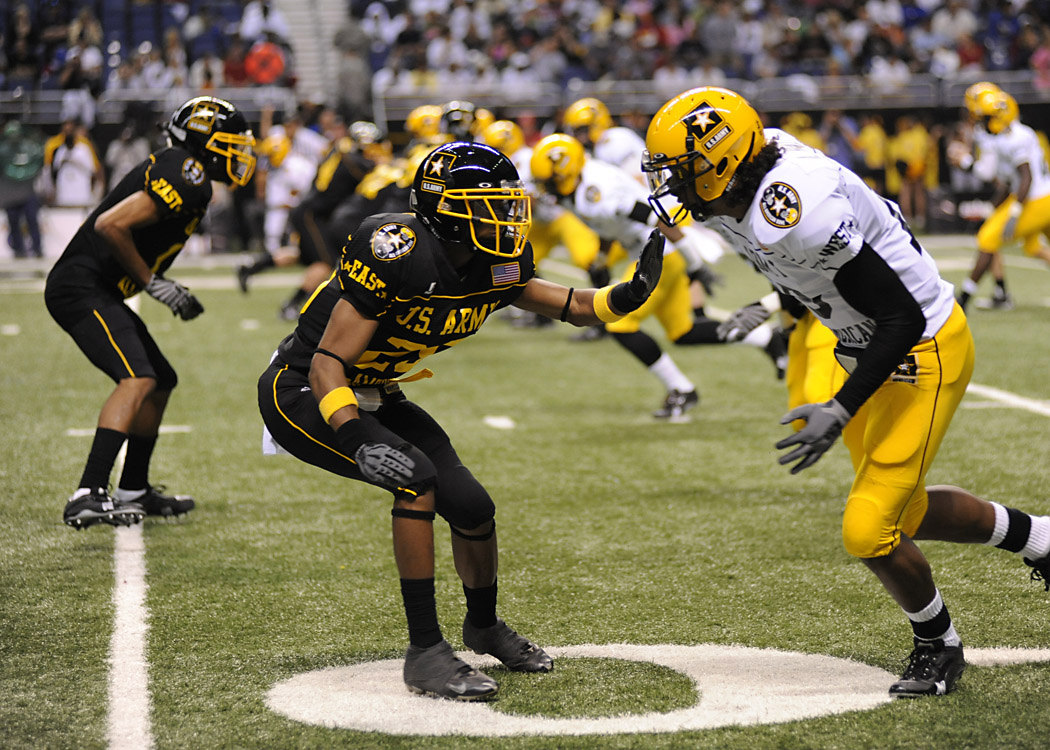
The 2009 U.S. Army All-American Bowl

West

- Vontaze Burfict – Arizona State
- D. J. Fluker – Alabama
- Nico Johnson – Alabama
- Devon Kennard – USC
- Dre Kirkpatrick – Alabama
- A. J. McCarron – Alabama
- T. J. McDonald – USC
- Christine Michael – Texas A&M
- Barkevious Mingo – LSU
- Rueben Randle – LSU
- Sheldon Richardson – Missouri
- Ronnie Wingo – Arkansas

=== 2010 ===
East

- Keenan Allen – California
- Martavis Bryant – Clemson
- Matt Elam – Florida
- Ego Ferguson – LSU
- Sharrif Floyd – Florida
- Khairi Fortt – Penn State
- Marcus Lattimore – South Carolina
- Kelcy Quarles – South Carolina
- Silas Redd – Penn State
- Spencer Ware – LSU
- Jaylen Watkins – Florida

West

- Anthony Barr – UCLA
- Ahmad Dixon – Baylor
- Marquis Flowers – Arizona
- Jackson Jeffcoat – Texas
- Tony Jefferson – Oklahoma
- Jake Matthews – Texas A&M
- C.J. Mosley – Alabama
- Ronald Powell – Florida
- Eric Reid – LSU
- Lache Seastrunk – Oregon
- Robert Woods – USC

=== 2011 ===
East

- Teddy Bridgewater – Louisville
- Timmy Jernigan – Florida State
- Nick O'Leary – Florida State
- Stephon Tuitt – Notre Dame
- Charone Peake – Clemson
- Sammy Watkins – Clemson
- Ray Drew – Missouri
- Curtis Grant – Ohio State
- Tony Steward – Clemson
- James Wilder Jr. – Florida State

West

- Odell Beckham Jr. – LSU
- Malcolm Brown – Texas
- Kenny Hilliard – LSU
- Harvey Langi – Utah
- Jaxon Shipley – Texas
- Herschel Sims – Oklahoma State
- Cody Kessler – USC
- Austin Seferian-Jenkins – Washington
- De'Anthony Thomas – Oregon

=== 2012 ===
East

- Anthony Alford – Southern Miss
- Jonathan Bullard – Florida
- Deon Bush – Miami
- Stefon Diggs – Maryland
- Eli Harold – Virginia
- Tracy Howard – Miami
- D. J. Humphries – Florida

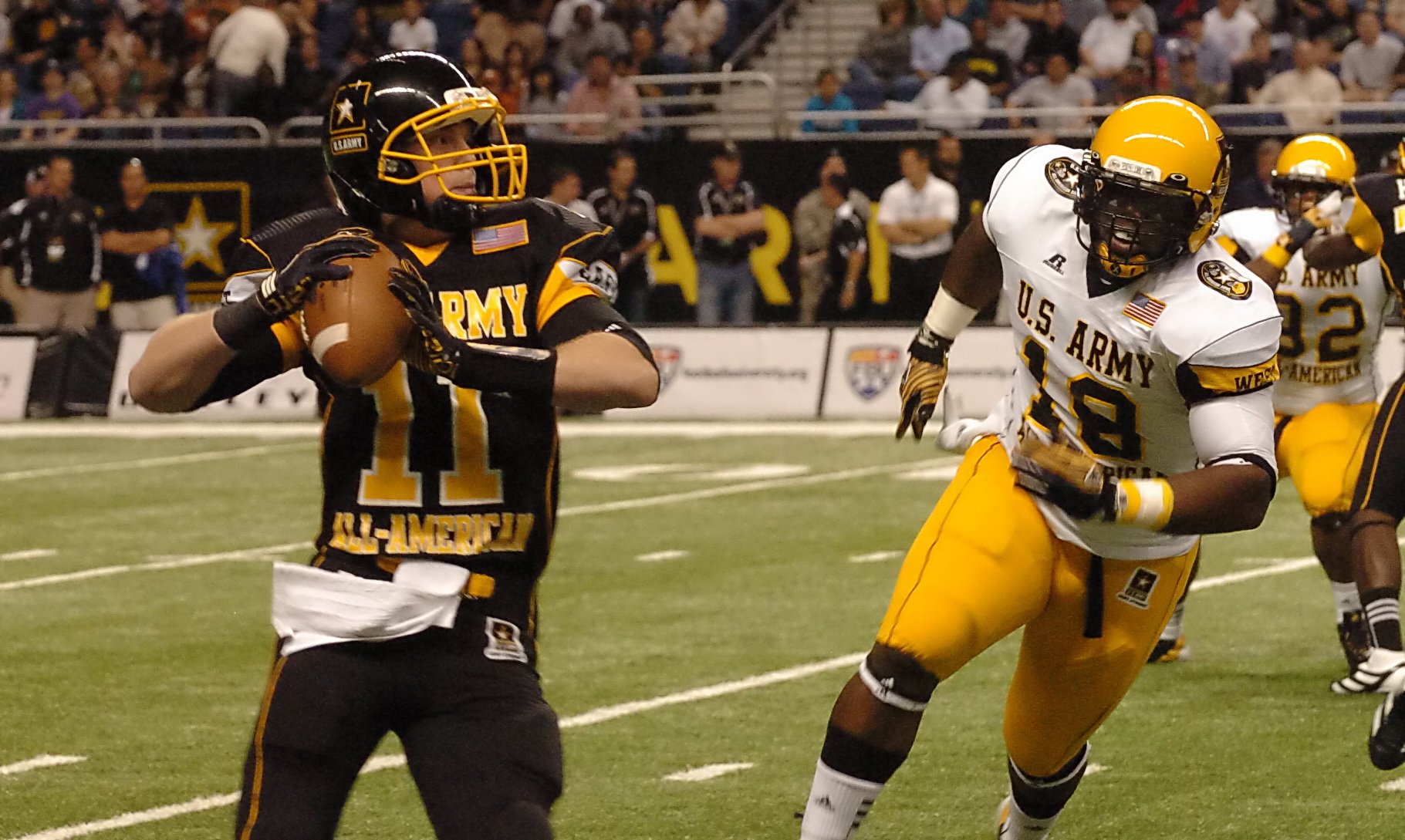
The 2012 U.S. Army All-American Bowl

West

- Arik Armstead – Oregon
- Dorial Green-Beckham – Missouri
- Byron Marshall – Oregon
- Ellis McCarthy – UCLA
- Cyler Miles – Washington
- Jordan Payton – UCLA
- KeiVarae Russell – Notre Dame
- Barry J. Sanders – Stanford
- Kevon Seymour – USC
- Shaq Thompson – Washington
- Max Tuerk – USC
- Trey Williams -Texas A&M
- T.J. Yeldon – Alabama

=== 2013 ===
East

- Mackensie Alexander – Clemson
- Jonathan Allen – Alabama
- Eli Apple – Ohio State
- Tyler Boyd – Pittsburgh
- Jake Butt – Michigan
- Kendall Fuller – Virginia Tech
- Derrick Henry – Alabama
- Jalen Ramsey – Florida State
- Laremy Tunsil – Ole Miss

West

- Max Browne – USC
- Su'a Cravens – USC
- Ezekiel Elliott – Ohio State
- Myles Jack – UCLA
- A'Shawn Robinson – Alabama
- Jaylon Smith – Notre Dame
- Thomas Tyner – Oregon
- Eddie Vanderdoes – UCLA
- Tre'Davious White – LSU

=== 2014 ===
East

- Nick Chubb – Georgia
- Elijah Hood – North Carolina
- Jalen Hurd – Tennessee
- Sony Michel – Georgia
- Curtis Samuel – Ohio State
- Artavis Scott – Clemson
- Mason Cole – Michigan
- Rodrigo Blankenship – Georgia

West

- Budda Baker – Washington
- KD Cannon – Baylor
- Royce Freeman – Oregon
- Jerrod Heard – Texas
- Allen Lazard – Iowa State
- Christian McCaffrey – Stanford
- Malik McDowell – Michigan State
- Joe Mixon – Oklahoma

=== 2015 ===
East

- Jordan Scarlett – Florida
- Van Jefferson – Ole Miss, Florida
- Drew Lock – Missouri
- Jaquan Johnson – Miami (FL)
- Deon Cain – Clemson
- Neville Gallimore – Oklahoma
- Chandler Cox – Auburn
- Lawrence Cager – Miami (FL), Georgia
- Tarvarus McFadden – Florida State
- Sam Darnold – USC
- Tommy Townsend – Tennessee
- Mark Fields – Clemson
- John Reid – Penn State
- Deandre Baker – Georgia
- Rodrigo Blankenship – Georgia
- D'Andre Walker – Georgia
- Jerome Baker – Ohio State
- Justin Hilliard – Ohio State
- Blake Ferguson – LSU
- Chuma Edoga – USC
- Isaiah Prince – Ohio State
- Albert Huggins – Clemson
- Kyle Phillips – Tennessee
- Mitch Hyatt – Clemson
- Martez Ivey – Florida
- Trenton Thompson – Georgia
- Juwan Johnson – Penn State
- Darius Slayton – Georgia
- Natrez Patrick – Georgia

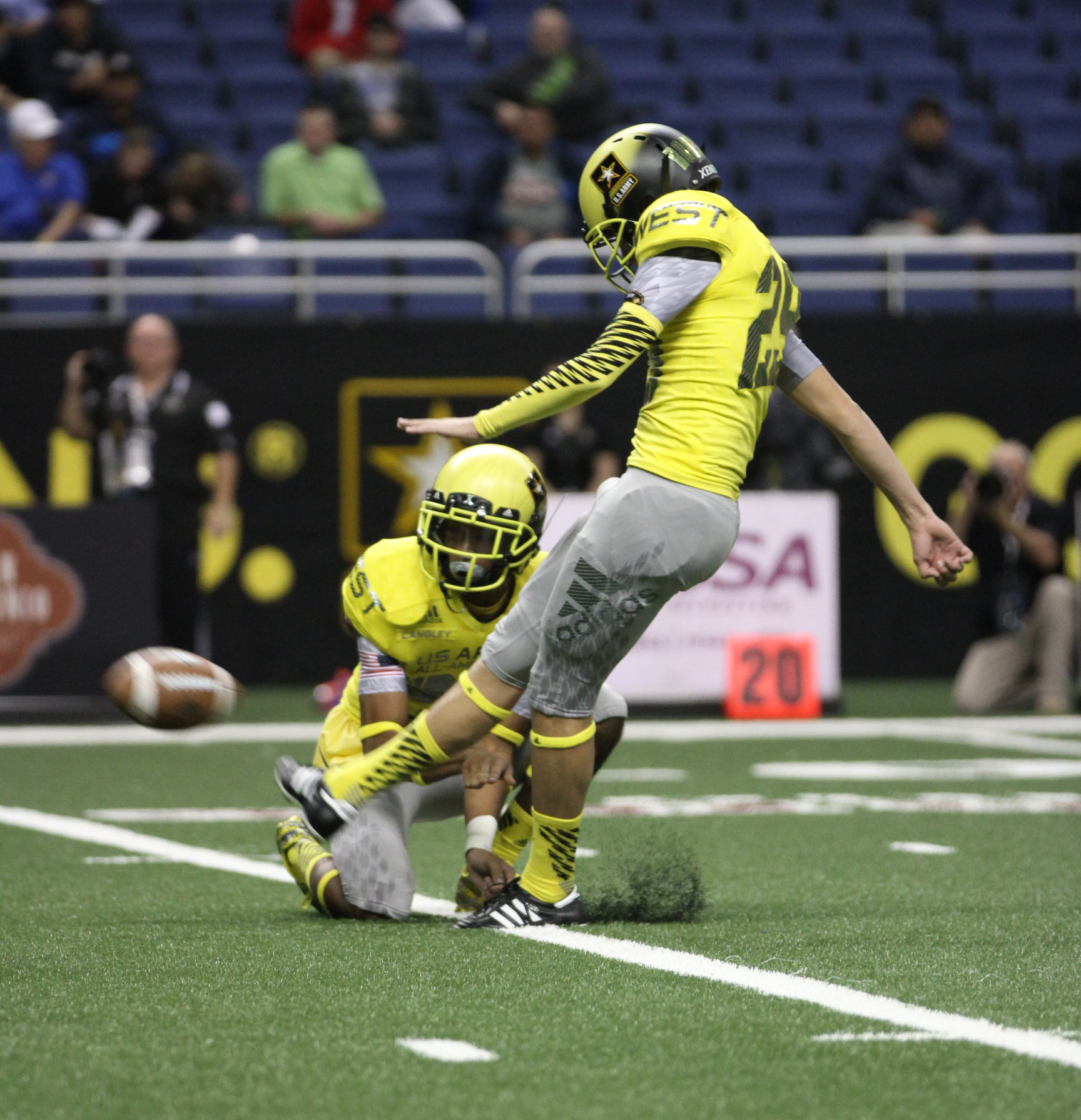
The 2015 U.S. Army All-American Bowl

West

- Jamal Peters – Mississippi State
- Porter Gustin – USC
- Brady White – Arizona State
- Kahlil McKenzie – Tennessee
- Marvell Tell – USC
- Donte Jackson – LSU
- Trenton Irwin – Stanford
- Derrius Guice – LSU
- Asmar Bilal – Notre Dame
- Kris Boyd – Texas
- Isaiah Langley – USC
- Liam McCullough – Ohio State
- Tristen Hoge – Notre Dame
- Jerry Tillery – Notre Dame
- Javon Patterson – Ole Miss
- Keaton Sutherland – Texas A&M
- Derrick Dillon – Florida
- K. J. Hill – Arkansas
- Dre'Mont Jones – Ohio State
- Blake Lynch – Baylor
- Rasheem Green – USC
- Alizé Jones – Notre Dame

=== 2016 ===
East

- Derrick Brown – Auburn
- Brian Burns – Florida State
- Jonathon Cooper – Ohio State
- Carter Coughlin – Minnesota
- Ben Cleveland – Georgia
- Bryan Edwards – South Carolina
- Jacob Eason – Georgia
- Jordan Fuller – Ohio State
- Mecole Hardman – Georgia
- Javon Kinlaw – South Carolina
- Dexter Lawrence – Clemson
- Connor McGovern – Penn State
- DK Metcalf – Ole Miss
- Trayvon Mullen – Clemson
- Shaq Quarterman – Miami
- Demetris Robertson – California
- John Simpson – Clemson

West

- Ross Blacklock – TCU
- Raekwon Davis – Alabama
- Jack Jones – USC
- Justin Madubuike – Texas A&M
- Byron Murphy – Washington
- Michael Onwenu – Michigan
- Shea Patterson – Ole Miss
- Michael Pittman Jr. – USC
- Curtis Robinson – Stanford
- Jeffery Simmons – Mississippi State
- Cole Van Lanen – Wisconsin
- Landon Young – Kentucky

=== 2017 ===
East

- Cam Akers – Florida State
- Montaric Brown – Arkansas
- A. J. Epenesa – Iowa
- Jake Fromm – Georgia
- Donovan Peoples-Jones – Michigan
- Willie Gay – Mississippi State
- Creed Humphrey – Oklahoma
- Cole Kmet – Notre Dame
- Davis Mills – Stanford
- Josh Myers – Ohio State
- Jacob Phillips – LSU
- Henry Ruggs – Alabama
- D'Andre Swift – Georgia
- Tua Tagovailoa – Alabama
- Ambry Thomas – Michigan
- Andrew Thomas – Georgia
- Shaun Wade – Ohio State
- Chase Young – Ohio State

West

- Baron Browning – Ohio State
- J. K. Dobbins – Ohio State
- Najee Harris – Alabama
- Darnay Holmes – UCLA
- Austin Jackson – USC
- Jaylon Johnson – Utah
- Deommodore Lenoir – Oregon
- Walker Little – Stanford
- Jeff Okudah – Ohio State
- Colby Parkinson – Stanford
- Jaelan Phillips – UCLA
- Foster Sarell – Stanford
- DeVonta Smith – Alabama
- Marlon Tuipulotu – USC
- Tristan Wirfs – Iowa

=== 2018 ===
East

- Trevor Lawrence – Clemson
- Xavier Thomas – Clemson
- Micah Parsons – Penn State
- Patrick Surtain II – Alabama
- Zamir White – Georgia
- Jamaree Salyer – Georgia
- Tyson Campbell – Georgia
- Jackson Carman – Clemson
- Adam Anderson – Georgia
- Taron Vincent – Ohio State
- Cade Mays – Georgia, Tennessee
- Derion Kendrick – Clemson, Georgia
- Jaelen Gill – Ohio State, Boston College, Fresno State
- Jeremy Ruckert – Ohio State
- James Cook – Georgia
- Nesta Jade Silvera – Miami (FL), Arizona State
- Trey Hill – Georgia
- Rasheed Walker – Penn State
- Jarren Williams – Miami (FL)
- Payton Wilson – NC State
- Phil Jurkovec – Notre Dame, Boston College, Pittsburgh
- Channing Tindall – Georgia
- Jalyn Armour-Davis – Alabama
- Josh Jobe – Alabama
- Ricky Person Jr. – NC State
- Azeez Ojulari – Georgia
- Dallas Gant – Ohio State, Toledo
- Alim McNeill – NC State
- Rondale Moore – Purdue
- Darian Kinnard – Kentucky
- B. T. Potter – Clemson

West

- Amon-Ra St. Brown – USC
- JT Daniels – Georgia, USC, West Virginia, Rice
- Caden Sterns – Texas
- Jaylen Waddle – Alabama
- Kelvin Joseph – LSU, Kentucky
- Tanner McKee – Stanford
- Tommy Togiai – Ohio State
- Penei Sewell – Oregon
- Brennan Eagles – Texas
- Matt Corral – Mississippi
- Anthony Cook – Texas
- Ronnie Perkins – Oklahoma
- Josh Proctor – Ohio State
- Leon O'Neal Jr. – Texas A&M
- Solomon Tuliaupupu – USC
- Talanoa Hufanga – USC
- Colson Yankoff – Washington
- Justin Dedich – USC
- Aidan Hutchinson – Michigan
- Emil Ekiyor Jr. – Alabama
- Cameron McGrone – Michigan
- Ale Kaho – Alabama, UCLA
- Chase Cota – UCLA, Oregon
- DaShaun White – Oklahoma
- Jalen Mayfield – Michigan
- Micah Baskerville – LSU
- Tyler Linderbaum – Iowa

=== 2019 ===
East

- Nolan Smith – Georgia
- Jadon Haselwood – Oklahoma
- Antonio Alfano – Alabama, Colorado
- Zach Harrison – Ohio State
- Travon Walker – Georgia
- Charles Cross – Mississippi State
- Christopher Hinton - Michigan
- Tyrique Stevenson – Georgia, Miami (FL)
- Frank Ladson Jr. – Clemson, Miami (FL), UMass
- Nick Cross – Maryland
- George Karlaftis – Purdue
- Kyle Hamilton – Notre Dame
- Graham Mertz – Wisconsin, Florida
- Khris Bogle – Florida, Michigan State
- Byron Young – Alabama
- Caedan Wallace – Penn State
- Wan'Dale Robinson – Nebraska
- Ty'Ron Hopper – Florida, Missouri
- Sam Howell – North Carolina
- Will Putnam – Clemson
- Mohamoud Diabate – Florida
- Ramel Keyton – Tennessee
- David Bell – Purdue
- Ronnie Hickman – Ohio State
- Cam Smith – South Carolina
- Cornelius Johnson – Michigan
- Taulia Tagovailoa – Alabama
- Eric Gray – Tennessee
- Xavier Truss – Georgia
- Steele Chambers – Ohio State
- Tiawan Mullen – Indiana

West

- Derek Stingley – LSU
- Bru McCoy – Texas, USC, Tennessee
- Spencer Rattler – Oklahoma, South Carolina
- Daxton Hill – Michigan
- DeMarvin Leal – Texas A&M
- Garrett Wilson – Ohio State
- Jordan Whittington – Texas
- Henry To'oTo'o – Tennessee, Alabama
- Drake Jackson – USC
- Ryan Hilinski – South Carolina, Northwestern
- Sean Rhyan – UCLA
- Demani Richardson – Texas A&M
- Tyler Owens – Texas, Texas Tech
- Christian Harris – Alabama
- Austin Stogner – Oklahoma, South Carolina
- Trent McDuffie – Washington
- Puka Nacua – Washington, BYU
- Siaki Ika – LSU, Baylor
- Tyrion Davis-Price – LSU
- Isaiah Foskey – Notre Dame
- Asa Turner – Washington
- Breece Hall – Iowa State
- Grant Gunnell – Arizona, Memphis, North Texas, Sam Houston
- Joe Shimko – NC State

=== 2020 ===
East

- DJ Uiagalelei – Clemson, Oregon State, Florida State
- Bryan Bresee – Clemson
- Will Anderson Jr. – Alabama
- Paris Johnson Jr. – Ohio State
- Arik Gilbert – LSU, Georgia, Nebraska, Savannah State
- Myles Murphy – Clemson
- Michael Mayer – Notre Dame
- Peter Skoronski – Northwestern
- Jahmyr Gibbs – Alabama, Georgia Tech
- Antonio Johnson – Texas A&M
- Brian Branch – Alabama
- Que Robinson – Alabama
- Xzavier Henderson – Florida, Cincinnati
- Tate Ratledge – Georgia
- Jalen Kimber – Georgia, Florida, Penn State
- Key Lawrence – Tennessee, Oklahoma, Ole Miss, UCLA
- Fred Davis II – Clemson, UCF, Jacksonville State, Northwestern
- Cody Simon – Ohio State
- Harrison Bailey – Tennessee, UNLV, Louisville, Florida
- Josh Downs – North Carolina
- Luke Wypler – Ohio State
- Kobe Hudson – Auburn, UCF
- Malachi Moore – Alabama
- KeAndre Lambert-Smith – Penn State, Auburn
- Moose Muhammad III – Texas A&M
- Alex Huntley – South Carolina
- Myles Hinton – Stanford, Michigan
- Kalel Mullings – Michigan
- Jalen Berger – Wisconsin, Michigan State, UCLA
- Javon Baker – Alabama, UCF
- Josh Fryar – Ohio State
- Tate Rodemaker – Florida State, Southern Miss

West

- Bryce Young – Alabama
- Kelee Ringo – Georgia
- Justin Flowe – Oregon, Arizona, UNLV
- Jaxon Smith-Njigba – Ohio State
- Eli Ricks – LSU, Alabama
- Noah Sewell – Oregon
- Bijan Robinson – Texas
- Jack Nelson – Wisconsin
- C. J. Stroud – Ohio State
- Alfred Collins – Texas
- Gee Scott Jr. – Ohio State
- Jalen McMillan – Washington
- Gary Bryant Jr. – USC, Oregon
- McKinnley Jackson – Texas A&M
- Jacobian Guillory II – LSU
- Jalin Conyers – Oklahoma, Arizona State, Texas Tech
- Roger Rosengarten – Washington
- Edgerrin Cooper – Texas A&M
- Trey Wedig – Wisconsin, Indiana
- Logan Jones – Iowa
- Van Fillinger – Utah
- A. J. Henning – Michigan, Northwestern
- Patrick Jenkins – TCU, Tulane
- Lathan Ransom – Ohio State
- R.J. Mickens – Clemson
- Xavion Alford – Texas, USC, Arizona State
- Gus Hartwig – Purdue
- Daniel Jackson – Minnesota
- Dwight McGlothern – LSU, Arkansas

=== 2021 ===
Not played due to the COVID-19 pandemic

=== 2022 ===
East

- Drew Allar – Penn State
- Mykel Williams – Georgia
- Nicholas Singleton – Penn State
- Marvin Jones Jr. – Georgia, Florida State, Oklahoma
- Dani Dennis-Sutton – Penn State
- Elijah Pritchett – Alabama, Nebraska
- Tegra Tshabola – Ohio State
- Isaiah Bond – Alabama, Texas
- Smoke Bouie – Texas A&M, Georgia
- Oscar Delp – Georgia
- Zeke Berry – Michigan
- Barion Brown – Kentucky, LSU
- Earl Little Jr. – Alabama, Florida State
- Jake Johnson – Texas A&M, North Carolina
- Nyjalik Kelly – Miami (FL), UCF
- Julian Humphrey – Georgia, Texas A&M
- Gunner Stockton – Georgia
- Aamil Wagner – Notre Dame
- Davison Igbinosun – Ole Miss, Ohio State
- Nick Evers – Oklahoma, Wisconsin, UConn
- Christen Miller – Georgia
- Omarion Hampton – North Carolina
- Jordan James – Oregon
- Vincent Anthony Jr. – Duke
- Sebastian Cheeks – North Carolina, Wisconsin
- Andrew Chamblee – Arkansas, SMU
- Jyaire Brown – Ohio State, LSU, UCF
- Sam Horn – Missouri
- Devin Moore – Florida
- Jaden Mangham – Michigan State, Michigan
- Ashton Craig – Notre Dame
- Jayden Denegal – Michigan, San Diego State
- Trevor Etienne – Florida, Georgia
- Evan Crenshaw – Coastal Carolina, Troy

West

- Josh Conerly Jr. – Oregon
- Cade Klubnik – Clemson
- Xavier Nwankpa – Iowa
- Ty Simpson – Alabama
- David Bailey – Stanford, Texas Tech
- Tetairoa McMillan – Arizona
- Toriano Pride – Clemson, Missouri
- Lander Barton – Utah
- Devin Brown – Ohio State, California
- Earnest Greene – Georgia
- CJ Williams – USC, Wisconsin, Stanford
- Raleek Brown – USC, Arizona State
- Kevin Coleman Jr. – Jackson State, Louisville, Mississippi State, Missouri
- Joshua Burnham – Notre Dame, Indiana
- Kaleb Brown – Ohio State, Iowa, UAB
- Kendrick Law – Alabama, Kentucky
- Chris McClellan – Florida, Missouri
- Tyler Morris – Michigan, Indiana
- Devon Jackson – Oregon
- Aaron Graves – Iowa
- Hero Kanu – Ohio State, Texas
- Gentry Williams – Oklahoma, Georgia
- Jaylon Guilbeau – Texas
- Gavin Sawchuk – Oklahoma, Florida State
- Isaiah Sategna – Arkansas, Oklahoma
- Caden Curry – Ohio State
- Joe Brunner – Wisconsin
- Billy Schrauth – Notre Dame
- Alex Afari – Kentucky
- Nic Scourton – Purdue, Texas A&M
- Carson Hinzman – Ohio State
- Darrius Clemons – Michigan, Oregon State
- Myles Rowser – Campbell, New Mexico State, Arizona state
- Justyn Martin – UCLA, Maryland

=== 2023 ===
East

- Keon Keeley – Alabama, Notre Dame
- Dante Moore – UCLA, Oregon
- Caleb Downs – Alabama, Ohio State
- Samson Okunlola – Miami (FL)
- Carnell Tate – Ohio State
- Hykeem Williams – Florida State, Colorado
- A. J. Harris – Georgia, Penn State, Indiana
- Monroe Freeling – Georgia
- Justice Haynes – Alabama, Michigan, Georgia Tech
- Brandon Inniss – Ohio State
- Damon Wilson – Georgia, Missouri, Miami (FL)
- CJ Allen – Georgia
- Aidan Chiles – Oregon State, Michigan State, Northwestern
- Keldric Faulk – Auburn
- Malik Hartford – Ohio State, UCLA
- Whit Weeks – LSU
- Mark Fletcher Jr. – Miami (FL)
- Christopher Vizzina – Clemson
- Luke Montgomery – Ohio State
- Boubacar Traore – Notre Dame
- Eli Holstein – Alabama, Pittsburgh, Virginia
- Kayin Lee – Auburn, Tennessee
- Connor Lew – Auburn
- Adon Shuler – Notre Dame
- Josiah Trotter – West Virginia, Missouri
- Palmer Williams – Baylor

West

- Kadyn Proctor – Alabama
- Anthony Hill Jr. – Texas
- Jurrion Dickey – Oregon, Diablo Valley
- Yhonzae Pierre – Alabama
- Rueben Owens II – Texas A&M
- Spencer Fano – Utah
- T. J. Parker – Clemson
- Charles Jagusah – Notre Dame
- Matayo Uiagalelei – Oregon
- Jelani McDonald – Texas
- Bai Jobe – Michigan State, Kansas, Miami (OH)
- Lawson Luckie – Georgia
- Sammy Omosigho – Oklahoma, UCLA
- Quinten Joyner – USC, Texas Tech
- Ryan Niblett – Texas
- DeAndre Moore Jr. – Texas, Colorado
- Dalton Brooks – Texas A&M
- Lincoln Kienholz – Ohio State, Louisville
- Austin Novosad – Oregon, Bowling Green
- Walker Lyons – USC, BYU
- Caleb Lomu – Utah
- Kenny Minchey – Notre Dame, Kentucky
- Arion Carter – Tennessee
- Jamari Johnson – Louisville, Oregon
- Princewill Umanmielen – Nebraska, Ole Miss, LSU
- Drayk Bowen – Notre Dame
- Rico Flores Jr. – Notre Dame, UCLA, Virginia
- Nicolas Radicic – Indiana

=== 2024 ===
East

- Jeremiah Smith – Ohio State
- KJ Bolden – Georgia
- Sammy Brown – Clemson
- L.J. McCray – Florida
- T. J. Moore – Clemson
- Eddrick Houston – Ohio State
- Josiah Thompson – South Carolina
- Amaris Williams – Auburn
- Luke Reynolds – Penn State
- Bryce Young – Notre Dame
- Nitro Tuggle – Georgia, Purdue
- James Peoples – Ohio State
- Jordan Shipp – North Carolina
- Will Echoles – Ole Miss
- Demond Williams Jr. – Arizona, Washington
- Fletcher Westphal – Florida
- Chauncey Bowens – Georgia

West

- Justin Scott – Miami (FL)
- Zabien Brown – Alabama
- Marquise Lightfoot – Miami (FL)
- Ryan Wingo – Texas
- Kyngstonn Viliamu-Asa – Notre Dame
- Nate Frazier – Georgia
- Carter Nelson – Nebraska
- Aaron Flowers – Oregon
- Kameryn Crawford – USC
- Koi Perich – Minnesota
- Walker White – Auburn, Baylor
- Andrew Sprague – Michigan
- Terrell Anderson – NC State, USC
- Daniel Hill – Alabama
- Payton Pierce – Ohio State
- Hauss Hejny – TCU, Oklahoma State
- Faletau Satuala – BYU
- Emmett Mosley V – Stanford, Texas

=== 2025 ===
East

- Amare Adams – Clemson
- Xavier Griffin – Alabama
- Darius Gray – South Carolina
- Malachi Goodman – Penn State
- Jorden Edmonds – Alabama
- Iose Epenesa – Iowa
- Linkon Cure – Kansas State
- Quincy Porter – Ohio State, Notre Dame
- Tyler Atkinson – Texas
- Jaime Ffrench Jr. – Texas, Michigan
- J'Zavien Currence – South Carolina
- Eric Winters – Auburn
- AJ Hill – Memphis, Arkansas
- Winston Watkins Jr. – Ole Miss, LSU

West

- Keisean Henderson – Houston
- Andrew Babalola – Michigan
- Felix Ojo – Texas Tech
- Kaliq Lockett – Texas
- Kade Phillips – Texas
- Talyn Taylor – Georgia
- Ryan Fodje – Oklahoma
- Andrew Marsh – Michigan
- Nate Marshall – Michigan
- Bowe Bentley – Oklahoma
- Kaleb Edwards – Alabama
- Marco Jones – Texas A&M
- Alvin Henderson – Auburn

=== 2026 ===
East

- Luke Wafle – USC
- Tristen Keys – Tennessee
- Julian Walker – South Carolina

West

- Brandon Arrington – Texas A&M
- Felix Ojo – Texas Tech
- Chris Henry Jr. – Ohio State
- Kayden Dixon-Wyatt – USC
- Corey Dailey – Pittsburgh
- Trent Mosley – USC
- Madden Williams – Texas A&M

== Breakdown of selections ==
The below statistics are sourced from 247Sports All-American Bowl Roster pages 2010–2026.

Height/Weight and Highest State Representation by Position of All-American Selections, 2010–2025
| Position | Average height | Average weight | States with most selections |
|---|---|---|---|
| APB | 5 ft 10 in (1.78 m) | 183 lb (83 kg) | CA, TX (4) |
| ATH | 6 ft 1 in (1.85 m) | 192 lb (87 kg) | CA (8) |
| CB | 6 ft 0 in (1.83 m) | 180 lb (82 kg) | CA (25) |
| DL | 6 ft 4 in (1.93 m) | 273 lb (124 kg) | FL, GA (9) |
| DT | 6 ft 3 in (1.91 m) | 300 lb (140 kg) | GA (10) |
| DUAL | 6 ft 2 in (1.88 m) | 199 lb (90 kg) | FL, TX (4) |
| Edge | 6 ft 4 in (1.93 m) | 233 lb (106 kg) | FL (10) |
| ILB | 6 ft 2 in (1.88 m) | 224 lb (102 kg) | GA (6) |
| IOL | 6 ft 4 in (1.93 m) | 297 lb (135 kg) | TX, GA (7) |
| K | 6 ft 1 in (1.85 m) | 186 lb (84 kg) | TX (11) |
| LB | 6 ft 2 in (1.88 m) | 217 lb (98 kg) | CA, GA (10) |
| LS | 6 ft 1 in (1.85 m) | 219 lb (99 kg) | FL, TX, GA, CA (3) |
| OC | 6 ft 4 in (1.93 m) | 286 lb (130 kg) | TX, IL (4) |
| OG | 6 ft 4 in (1.93 m) | 307 lb (139 kg) | CA, TX (9) |
| OLB | 6 ft 2 in (1.88 m) | 217 lb (98 kg) | CA (15) |
| OT | 6 ft 6 in (1.98 m) | 297 lb (135 kg) | TX (24) |
| P | 6 ft 2 in (1.88 m) | 191 lb (87 kg) | CA, NC, FL (4) |
| PRO | 6 ft 3 in (1.91 m) | 208 lb (94 kg) | CA (10) |
| QB | 6 ft 3 in (1.91 m) | 202 lb (92 kg) | TX (8) |
| RB | 6 ft 0 in (1.83 m) | 207 lb (94 kg) | TX, FL (17) |
| S | 6 ft 1 in (1.85 m) | 190 lb (86 kg) | FL (21) |
| SDE | 6 ft 4 in (1.93 m) | 261 lb (118 kg) | TX (8) |
| TE | 6 ft 5 in (1.96 m) | 232 lb (105 kg) | FL (10) |
| WDE | 6 ft 4 in (1.93 m) | 234 lb (106 kg) | CA (10) |
| WR | 6 ft 1 in (1.85 m) | 187 lb (85 kg) | CA (34) |
| Total | 6 ft 2 in (1.88 m) | 229 lb (104 kg) | |

=== By state ===
All-American Bowl selections have represented 46 states and provinces since 2010. Texas has the most selections all-time with 236. California (233), Florida (218), and Georgia (185) are the only other states with more than 100 selections.

Selections by State, 2010–2026
| StateProvince | Total | 2026 | 2025 | 2024 | 2023 | 2022 | 2021^{‡} | 2020 | 2019 | 2018 | 2017 | 2016 | 2015 | 2014 | 2013^{†} | 2012 | 2011 | 2010 |
|---|---|---|---|---|---|---|---|---|---|---|---|---|---|---|---|---|---|---|
| Total | 1646 | 102 | 108 | 107 | 121 | 128 | 95 | 105 | 102 | 110 | 101 | 101 | 100 | 108 | 62 | 98 | 99 | 101 |
| TX | 236 | 20 | 23 | 15 | 20 | 15 | 10 | 15 | 14 | 12 | 12 | 9 | 7 | 15 | | 15 | 19 | 15 |
| CA | 233 | 15 | 12 | 14 | 13 | 16 | 10 | 11 | 17 | 13 | 17 | 18 | 20 | 14 | 1 | 16 | 12 | 14 |
| FL | 218 | 10 | 13 | 14 | 21 | 11 | 17 | 9 | 13 | 16 | 8 | 13 | 16 | 11 | 13 | 11 | 15 | 7 |
| GA | 185 | 8 | 12 | 17 | 17 | 18 | 8 | 16 | 11 | 12 | 10 | 10 | 14 | 11 | 6 | 6 | 6 | 3 |
| NC | 60 | 2 | 2 | 4 | 5 | 3 | 3 | 3 | 3 | 6 | 3 | 3 | 2 | 6 | 3 | 6 | 4 | 2 |
| OH | 59 | 3 | 3 | 1 | 3 | 5 | 4 | 2 | 2 | 4 | 1 | 6 | 4 | 5 | 4 | 4 | 2 | 6 |
| TN | 49 | 5 | 3 | 1 | 5 | 4 | 1 | 3 | 2 | 4 | 4 | | 4 | 3 | 3 | 4 | 1 | 2 |
| LA | 48 | 2 | 1 | 1 | 2 | 7 | 5 | 3 | 4 | 2 | 3 | 1 | 5 | 3 | 1 | 1 | 5 | 2 |
| IL | 46 | 6 | 5 | 3 | 3 | 4 | 1 | 4 | | 1 | 2 | 2 | | 5 | | 3 | 3 | 4 |
| AL | 43 | 1 | 6 | 3 | 5 | 2 | 3 | 3 | 3 | 2 | 3 | | 1 | 2 | 2 | 2 | 3 | 2 |
| NJ | 41 | 2 | 4 | 2 | 1 | 2 | | 5 | 4 | 2 | | 2 | 2 | 1 | 6 | 5 | 2 | 1 |
| VA | 41 | | 2 | 2 | 2 | 1 | 2 | 1 | 2 | 1 | 2 | 2 | 4 | 4 | 7 | 4 | 2 | 3 |
| PA | 35 | 1 | 2 | 3 | 4 | 4 | 5 | 1 | 1 | 2 | 2 | 1 | 1 | 1 | 1 | 1 | 1 | 4 |
| MI | 33 | 1 | | 2 | 1 | 4 | 1 | | 2 | 3 | 4 | 7 | 1 | 2 | | 2 | 1 | 2 |
| SC | 32 | 3 | 2 | 1 | 1 | | 1 | 1 | 1 | 5 | 1 | 4 | 1 | 3 | 1 | | 3 | 4 |
| WA | 32 | | 1 | 3 | 2 | 4 | 4 | 3 | | 1 | 2 | 1 | 1 | 2 | 1 | 3 | 2 | 2 |
| AZ | 31 | 2 | | 1 | 2 | 1 | 2 | 4 | 3 | | 4 | 4 | | 4 | 1 | | 2 | 1 |
| IN | 30 | 3 | | 3 | 3 | 4 | 1 | 2 | 2 | 2 | 1 | 2 | 3 | 1 | 1 | 1 | | 1 |
| MS | 29 | 4 | 2 | 2 | | | | 1 | 2 | | 3 | 3 | 3 | 2 | | 1 | 3 | 3 |
| UT | 24 | 1 | 1 | | 3 | 2 | 1 | 3 | 2 | 2 | 2 | 2 | 2 | | | | 2 | 1 |
| MD | 21 | | 1 | | | 1 | 3 | 1 | 1 | 1 | 1 | | 2 | 2 | 2 | 1 | 2 | 3 |
| OK | 21 | | 1 | 1 | 1 | 2 | 3 | 2 | 2 | 3 | 3 | 1 | | | | 1 | | 1 |
| KY | 20 | 3 | 1 | | | | 1 | 2 | 1 | 1 | | 3 | 1 | 2 | 2 | 1 | 1 | 1 |
| MO | 20 | 1 | 1 | 2 | | 3 | 1 | 2 | | 3 | | | 1 | 1 | | 3 | | 2 |
| IA | 19 | 2 | 1 | 2 | 1 | 2 | 1 | 2 | | 1 | 2 | 1 | | 1 | 1 | | 1 | 1 |
| OR | 17 | | | | | 2 | 1 | 1 | | 4 | 1 | | | 1 | | 1 | 2 | 4 |
| CO | 15 | | | | 1 | 2 | | 1 | | 1 | 2 | | | 2 | 2 | 2 | | 2 |
| NV | 13 | | 2 | | | 2 | 1 | | | 2 | 4 | | 2 | | | | | |
| WI | 13 | | 1 | 1 | | 4 | | 2 | | | | 1 | | 1 | | 1 | 1 | 1 |
| HI | 11 | 1 | 1 | | | | 1 | | 2 | | 2 | 1 | | | | 1 | 1 | 1 |
| AR | 11 | 1 | | 3 | | 2 | | | 1 | | 1 | | 1 | 2 | | | | |
| KS | 11 | | 3 | 1 | | | | 1 | 2 | | | 1 | | | | 1 | 1 | 1 |
| CT | 9 | 1 | | 2 | | | | | 2 | 1 | 1 | | | | | | | 2 |
| MA | 8 | 2 | | 1 | 3 | | | 1 | | | | | | | 1 | | | |
| NE | 7 | 1 | 1 | 1 | 1 | 1 | | | | | | | | | 1 | | | 1 |
| MN | 5 | | | | | | 1 | | 1 | | | 1 | | | | | | 2 |
| ID | 5 | 1 | | 1 | | | | | | 2 | | | 1 | | | | | |
| NY | 5 | | | | | | 1 | | | 1 | | | | 1 | | 1 | 1 | |
| DE | 2 | | | | | | | | | | | | | | 2 | | | |
| SD | 2 | | | | 1 | | | | | | | 1 | | | | | | |
| WV | 2 | | | | | | 1 | | 1 | | | | | | | | | |
| DC | 1 | | | | | | 1 | | | | | | | | | | | |
| MT | 1 | | 1 | | | | | | | | | | | | | | | |
| NM | 1 | | | | | | | | | | | | | | | | 1 | |
| ON | 1 | | | | | | | | | | | | 1 | | | | | |
| QC | 1 | | | | | | | | | | | 1 | | | | | | |
| RI | 1 | | | | | | | | 1 | | | | | | | | | |
| ME | | | | | | | | | | | | | | | | | | |

† 2013 may have incomplete data on the 247sports.com roster page, underestimating counts
‡ 2021 game cancelled due to COVID

=== By school ===
Over 1,000 schools have had at least one player on All-American Bowl rosters and over 20% of have had more than one selection.

Santa Ana (CA) Mater Dei has the most all-time selections with 24, all coming since 2016. The only other schools with more than 10 selections are Bradenton (FL) IMG Academy, Bellflower (CA) St. John Bosco, Fort Lauderdale (FL) American Heritage, Buford (GA) Buford, Fort Lauderdale (FL) St. Thomas Aquinas and Southlake (TX) Southlake Carroll. IMG Academy also holds the record for most selections in a single year (5) in 2018.

==== Schools with multiple selections in a year ====
Schools with Multiple Selections in a Year, 2010–2026
| School | State | Year | Selections | Members |
|---|---|---|---|---|
| Bradenton (FL) IMG Academy | FL | 2018 | 5 | Brendan Radley-Hiles, Brian Hightower, T.J. Pledger, Taron Vincent, Xavier Thomas |
| Ramsey (NJ) Don Bosco Prep | NJ | 2012 | 4 | Darius Hamilton, Elijah Shumate, Leonte Carroo, Yuri Wright |
| Las Vegas (NV) Bishop Gorman | NV | 2017 | 4 | Bubba Bolden, Haskell Garrett, Tate Martell, Tyjon Lindsey |
| Santa Ana (CA) Mater Dei | CA | 2018 | 4 | Amon-Ra St. Brown, Chris Murray, JT Daniels, Solomon Tuliaupupu |
| Bradenton (FL) IMG Academy | FL | 2019 | 4 | Charles Turner, Dontae Lucas, Nolan Smith, Trey Sanders |
| Bellflower (CA) St. John Bosco | CA | 2023 | 4 | Aaron Williams, DeAndre Moore Jr., Matayo Uiagalelei, Pierce Clarkson |
| Santa Ana (CA) Mater Dei | CA | 2024 | 4 | Brandon Baker, DeAndre Carter, Nate Frazier, Zabien Brown |
| Santa Ana (CA) Mater Dei | CA | 2026 | 4 | Chris Henry Jr., Aaryn Washington, Kayden Dixon-Wyatt, Danny Lang |
| Bellflower (CA) St. John Bosco | CA | 2014 | 3 | Damien Mama, Jaleel Wadood, Naijiel Hale |
| Cibolo (TX) Steele | TX | 2011 | 3 | Malcolm Brown, Marquis Anderson, Ryan Simmons |
| Cleveland (OH) Glenville | OH | 2014 | 3 | Erick Smith, Marcelys Jones, Marshon Lattimore |
| Powder Springs (GA) McEachern | GA | 2015 | 3 | Chuma Edoga, TJ Rahming, Taj Griffin |
| Bradenton (FL) IMG Academy | FL | 2016 | 3 | Isaac Nauta, Shea Patterson, Tony Jones Jr. |
| Fort Lauderdale (FL) American Heritage | FL | 2018 | 3 | Nesta Jade Silvera, Patrick Surtain II, Tyson Campbell |
| Sammamish (WA) Eastside Catholic | WA | 2020 | 3 | Ayden Hector, Gee Scott Jr., Sam Adams II |
| Bradenton (FL) IMG Academy | FL | 2021 | 3 | J.J. McCarthy, Ja'Corey Brooks, Xavian Sorey |
| Miami (FL) Miami Central | FL | 2021 | 3 | Amari Daniels, Terrence Lewis, Yulkeith Brown |
| Miami (FL) Miami Palmetto | FL | 2021 | 3 | Brashard Smith, Corey Collier, Leonard Taylor |
| Philadelphia (PA) St. Joseph's Prep School | PA | 2021 | 3 | Jeremiah Trotter Jr., Kyle McCord, Marvin Harrison Jr. |
| Inglewood (CA) Inglewood | CA | 2022 | 3 | Clint Stephens, Justyn Martin, Taariq Al-Uqdah |
| Santa Ana (CA) Mater Dei | CA | 2022 | 3 | C.J. Williams, David Bailey, Raleek Brown |
| West Chester (OH) Lakota West | OH | 2022 | 3 | Alex Afari, Jyaire Brown, Tegra Tshabola |
| Bellflower (CA) St. John Bosco | CA | 2024 | 3 | Kyngstonn Viliamu-Asa, Marcelles Williams, Peyton Woodyard |
| Buford (GA) Buford | GA | 2024 | 3 | Dylan Raiola, Eddrick Houston, KJ Bolden |
| Chattanooga (TN) Baylor School | TN | 2025 | 3 | Cameron Sparks, Gabriel Osenda, Shekai Mills-Knight |
| Orlando (FL) The First Academy | FL | 2026 | 3 | Devin Jackson, Danny Odem, Reed Ramsier |
| Cleveland (OH) Glenville | OH | 2010 | 2 | Christian Bryant, Latwan Anderson |
| Duncan (SC) Byrnes | SC | 2010 | 2 | Brandon Willis, Marcus Lattimore |
| Fort Lauderdale (FL) St. Thomas Aquinas | FL | 2010 | 2 | Brandon Linder, Michael Palardy |
| Olive Branch (MS) Olive Branch | MS | 2010 | 2 | Damien Robinson, Shon Coleman |
| Palm Beach Gardens (FL) Dwyer | FL | 2010 | 2 | Gerald Christian, Matt Elam |
| Thousand Oaks (CA) Oaks Christian | CA | 2010 | 2 | Cassius Marsh, Malcolm Jones |
| Gardena (CA) Junipero Serra | CA | 2011 | 2 | George Farmer, Jason Gibson |
| Palm Beach Gardens (FL) Dwyer | FL | 2011 | 2 | Jacoby Brissett, Nick O'Leary |
| Sacramento (CA) Grant Union | CA | 2011 | 2 | James Sample, Viliami Moala |
| Spring (TX) Klein Collins | TX | 2011 | 2 | Charles Jackson, Garrett Greenlea |
| Tampa (FL) Plant | FL | 2011 | 2 | James Wilder, Phillip Ely |
| Charlotte (NC) Phillip O. Berry Academy | NC | 2012 | 2 | Germone Hopper, Nick Dawson |
| Cincinnati (OH) Taft | OH | 2012 | 2 | Adolphus Washington, Dwayne Stanford |
| Jacksonville (FL) The Bolles School | FL | 2012 | 2 | Brooks Abbott, John Theus |
| Lakewood (WA) Lakes | WA | 2012 | 2 | Cedric Dozier, Zach Banner |
| Stone Mountain (GA) Stephenson | GA | 2012 | 2 | Mike Davis, Raphael Kirby |
| Thousand Oaks (CA) Oaks Christian | CA | 2012 | 2 | Ishmael Adams, Jordan Payton |
| Ashburn (VA) Stone Bridge | VA | 2013 | 2 | Jonathan Allen, Ryan Burns |
| Louisville (KY) Trinity | KY | 2013 | 2 | James Quick, Jason Hatcher |
| Marietta (GA) Walton | GA | 2013 | 2 | Brandon Kublanow, Tyren Jones |
| Olney (MD) Good Counsel | MD | 2013 | 2 | Dorian O'Daniel, Kendall Fuller |
| Arlington (TX) Mansfield Timberview | TX | 2014 | 2 | Brandon Simmons, Ed Paris |
| Norcross (GA) Norcross | GA | 2014 | 2 | Kevin Mouhon, Myles Autry |
| Phoenix (AZ) Mountain Pointe | AZ | 2014 | 2 | Jalen Brown, Natrell Curtis |
| Scottsdale (AZ) Desert Mountain | AZ | 2014 | 2 | Kyle Allen, Mark Andrews |
| Tarpon Springs (FL) East Lake | FL | 2014 | 2 | Artavis Scott, Mason Cole |
| Apopka (FL) Apopka | FL | 2015 | 2 | Chandler Cox, Martez Ivey |
| Atlanta (GA) Mays | GA | 2015 | 2 | Dallas Warmack, Natrez Patrick |
| Fort Lauderdale (FL) American Heritage | FL | 2015 | 2 | Tarvarus McFadden, Torrance Gibson |
| Gardena (CA) Junipero Serra | CA | 2015 | 2 | Rasheem Green, Stanley Norman |
| Gilmer (TX) Gilmer | TX | 2015 | 2 | Blake Lynch, Kris Boyd |
| Las Vegas (NV) Bishop Gorman | NV | 2015 | 2 | Alize Mack, Nicco Fertitta |
| Miami (FL) Westminster Christian School | FL | 2015 | 2 | Jordan Cronkrite, Tim Irvin |
| Newhall (CA) Hart | CA | 2015 | 2 | Brady White, Trent Irwin |
| Detroit (MI) Cass Technical | MI | 2016 | 2 | Demetric Vance, Michael Onwenu |
| La Puente (CA) Bishop Amat | CA | 2016 | 2 | Trevon Sidney, Tyler Vaughns |
| Pompano Beach (FL) Coconut Creek | FL | 2016 | 2 | Malek Young, Trayvon Mullen |
| Rancho Santa Margarita (CA) Santa Margarita Catholic | CA | 2016 | 2 | KJ Costello, Kekoa Crawford |
| Santa Ana (CA) Mater Dei | CA | 2016 | 2 | Curtis Robinson, Frank Martin II |
| Detroit (MI) Cass Technical | MI | 2017 | 2 | Donovan Johnson, Donovan Peoples-Jones |
| Jacksonville (FL) Trinity Christian Academy | FL | 2017 | 2 | D.J. Matthews Jr., Shaun Wade |
| Los Angeles (CA) Cathedral | CA | 2017 | 2 | Hunter Echols, Jamire Calvin |
| Los Angeles (CA) Hawkins | CA | 2017 | 2 | Greg Johnson, Joseph Lewis |
| Cibolo (TX) Steele | TX | 2018 | 2 | Brenden Brady, Caden Sterns |
| Jersey City (NJ) St. Peters Prep | NJ | 2018 | 2 | Jayson Ademilola, Shayne Simon |
| Long Beach (CA) Long Beach Poly | CA | 2018 | 2 | Jalen Hall, Matt Corral |
| Rock Hill (SC) South Pointe | SC | 2018 | 2 | BT Potter, Derion Kendrick |
| Baton Rouge (LA) Southern Lab | LA | 2019 | 2 | Kardell Thomas, Tyrion Davis-Price |
| Bellflower (CA) St. John Bosco | CA | 2019 | 2 | Chris Steele, Trent McDuffie |
| Buford (GA) Buford | GA | 2019 | 2 | Harry Miller, Quentin Skinner |
| Concord (CA) De La Salle | CA | 2019 | 2 | Henry To'o To'o, Isaiah Foskey |
| Orange (CA) Orange Lutheran | CA | 2019 | 2 | Kyle Ford, Ryan Hilinski |
| Bellflower (CA) St. John Bosco | CA | 2020 | 2 | D.J. Uiagalelei, Kourt Williams |
| Marietta (GA) Marietta | GA | 2020 | 2 | Arik Gilbert, Harrison Bailey |
| Powder Springs (GA) McEachern | GA | 2020 | 2 | Jamil Burroughs, Javon Baker |
| Santa Ana (CA) Mater Dei | CA | 2020 | 2 | Bryce Young, Myles Murao |
| Southlake (TX) Southlake Carroll | TX | 2020 | 2 | Andrej Karic, RJ Mickens |
| Tucson (AZ) Salpointe Catholic | AZ | 2020 | 2 | Bijan Robinson, Lathan Ransom |
| Fort Lauderdale (FL) St. Thomas Aquinas | FL | 2021 | 2 | Dallas Turner, Tyreak Sapp |
| Scottsdale (AZ) Saguaro | AZ | 2021 | 2 | Bram Walden, Quintin Somerville |
| Southlake (TX) Southlake Carroll | TX | 2021 | 2 | Joe McFadden, Quinn Ewers |
| Suwanee (GA) North Gwinnett | GA | 2021 | 2 | Barrett Carter, Jordan Hancock |
| Bellflower (CA) St. John Bosco | CA | 2022 | 2 | Earnest Greene, Rayshon Luke |
| Fort Lauderdale (FL) American Heritage | FL | 2022 | 2 | Earl Little Jr., Marvin Jones Jr. |
| Kennesaw (GA) North Cobb | GA | 2022 | 2 | De'Nylon Morrissette, Samuel Mbake |
| Las Vegas (NV) Bishop Gorman | NV | 2022 | 2 | Cyrus Moss, Jake Taylor |
| Mission Hills (CA) Bishop Alemany | CA | 2022 | 2 | Larry Turner-Gooden, Niuafe Tuihalamaka |
| Philadelphia (PA) Imhotep Institute | PA | 2022 | 2 | Enai White, Keon Wylie |
| San Antonio (TX) Central Catholic | TX | 2022 | 2 | Ben Rios, Deandre Marshall |
| Bradenton (FL) IMG Academy | FL | 2023 | 2 | Carnell Tate, Jayden Wayne |
| Columbus (GA) Carver | GA | 2023 | 2 | Darron Reed, Kelton Smith |
| Coppell (TX) Coppell | TX | 2023 | 2 | Braxton Myers, Nicolas Radicic |
| Folsom (CA) Folsom | CA | 2023 | 2 | Rico Flores, Walker Lyons |
| Fort Lauderdale (FL) American Heritage | FL | 2023 | 2 | Brandon Inniss, Mark Fletcher |
| Manor (TX) Manor | TX | 2023 | 2 | Princewill Umanmielen, Quinten Joyner |
| Phenix City (AL) Central | AL | 2023 | 2 | AJ Harris, Tomarrion Parker |
| West Roxbury (MA) Catholic Memorial | MA | 2023 | 2 | Boubacar Traore, Jaedn Skeete |
| Bradenton (FL) IMG Academy | FL | 2024 | 2 | Jimothy Lewis, Jordan Seaton |
| Daytona Beach (FL) Mainland | FL | 2024 | 2 | LJ McCray, Zavier Mincey |
| Moultrie (GA) Colquitt County | GA | 2024 | 2 | Landen Thomas, Ny Carr |
| Nappanee (IN) Northwood | IN | 2024 | 2 | Jo'Ziah Edmond, NiTareon Tuggle |
| Seattle (WA) O'Dea | WA | 2024 | 2 | Isendre Ahfua, Jason Brown |
| Buford (GA) Buford | GA | 2025 | 2 | Bryce Perry-Wright, Jadon Perlotte |
| Douglasville (GA) Douglas County | GA | 2025 | 2 | Aaron Gregory, Devin Carter |
| Enterprise (AL) Enterprise | AL | 2025 | 2 | Eric Winters, Zion Grady |
| Jacksonville (FL) Mandarin | FL | 2025 | 2 | Hylton Stubbs, Jaime Ffrench |
| Santa Ana (CA) Mater Dei | CA | 2025 | 2 | Chuck McDonald, Jordon Davison |
| Bellflower (CA) St. John Bosco | CA | 2026 | 2 | Madden Williams, Jacob Whitehead |
| Canton (GA) Sequoyah | GA | 2026 | 2 | Will Rajecki, Alexander Brewer |
| Chatsworth (CA) Sierra Canyon | CA | 2026 | 2 | Havon Finney, Brandon Lockhart |
| Douglasville (GA) Douglas County | GA | 2026 | 2 | Joshua Sam-Epelle, Aaron Gregory |
| Indianapolis (IN) Warren Central | IN | 2026 | 2 | Sean Fox, JJ Finch |
| Marion (MA) Tabor Academy | MA | 2026 | 2 | Peter Bourque, Carter Gooden |
| Rosharon (TX) Iowa Colony | TX | 2026 | 2 | Jayden Warren, Carson White |
| Southlake (TX) Southlake Carroll | TX | 2026 | 2 | Tristan Dare, Zachary Hays |

==== Total selections ====
Total Selections by School, 2010–2026
| School | State | Selections | Members |
|---|---|---|---|
| Santa Ana (CA) Mater Dei | CA | 25 | Victor Blackwell (2011), Ben Humphreys (2015), Curtis Robinson (2016), Frank Martin II (2016), Amon-Ra St. Brown (2018), Chris Murray (2018), JT Daniels (2018), Solomon Tuliaupupu (2018), Bru McCoy (2019), Bryce Young (2020), Myles Murao (2020), Raesjon Davis (2021), C.J. Williams (2022), David Bailey (2022), Raleek Brown (2022), Brandon Baker (2024), DeAndre Carter (2024), Nate Frazier (2024), Zabien Brown (2024), Chuck McDonald (2025), Jordon Davison (2025), Chris Henry Jr. (2026), Aaryn Washington (2026), Kayden Dixon-Wyatt (2026), Danny Lang (2026) |
| Bradenton (FL) IMG Academy | FL | 23 | Isaac Nauta (2016), Shea Patterson (2016), Tony Jones Jr. (2016), Thomas Fletcher (2017), Brendan Radley-Hiles (2018), Brian Hightower (2018), T.J. Pledger (2018), Taron Vincent (2018), Xavier Thomas (2018), Charles Turner (2019), Dontae Lucas (2019), Nolan Smith (2019), Trey Sanders (2019), Eli Ricks (2020), J.J. McCarthy (2021), Ja'Corey Brooks (2021), Xavian Sorey (2021), Jaleel Skinner (2022), Carnell Tate (2023), Jayden Wayne (2023), Jimothy Lewis (2024), Jordan Seaton (2024), Donovan Johnson (2025) |
| Bellflower (CA) St. John Bosco | CA | 20 | Damien Mama (2014), Jaleel Wadood (2014), Naijiel Hale (2014), Wyatt Davis (2017), Jaiden Lars-Woodbey (2018), Chris Steele (2019), Trent McDuffie (2019), D.J. Uiagalelei (2020), Kourt Williams (2020), Earnest Greene (2022), Rayshon Luke (2022), Aaron Williams (2023), DeAndre Moore Jr. (2023), Matayo Uiagalelei (2023), Pierce Clarkson (2023), Kyngstonn Viliamu-Asa (2024), Marcelles Williams (2024), Peyton Woodyard (2024), Madden Williams (2026), Jacob Whitehead (2026) |
| Fort Lauderdale (FL) American Heritage | FL | 16 | Greg Bryant (2013), Sony Michel (2014), Tarvarus McFadden (2015), Torrance Gibson (2015), Brian Burns (2016), Tedarrell Slaton (2017), Nesta Jade Silvera (2018), Patrick Surtain II (2018), Tyson Campbell (2018), James Williams (2021), Earl Little Jr. (2022), Marvin Jones Jr. (2022), Brandon Inniss (2023), Mark Fletcher (2023), Malachi Toney (2025), Amare Nugent (2026) |
| Buford (GA) Buford | GA | 12 | Dillon Lee (2012), Korie Rogers (2014), Blake Ferguson (2015), Harry Miller (2019), Quentin Skinner (2019), Isaiah Bond (2022), Justice Haynes (2023), Dylan Raiola (2024), Eddrick Houston (2024), KJ Bolden (2024), Bryce Perry-Wright (2025), Jadon Perlotte (2025) |
| Fort Lauderdale (FL) St. Thomas Aquinas | FL | 11 | Brandon Linder (2010), Michael Palardy (2010), Jordan Scarlett (2015), Mike Harley (2017), Derek Wingo (2020), Dallas Turner (2021), Tyreak Sapp (2021), Julian Armella (2022), Jayvant Brown (2023), Michael Kern (2024), Justice Fitzpatrick (2025) |
| Southlake (TX) Southlake Carroll | TX | 11 | Cade Foster (2010), Robert Barnes (2017), Andrej Karic (2020), RJ Mickens (2020), Joe McFadden (2021), Quinn Ewers (2021), Landon Samson (2022), Tyler White (2023), Kyle Lemmermann (2024), Tristan Dare (2026), Zachary Hays (2026) |
| Las Vegas (NV) Bishop Gorman | NV | 10 | Alize Mack (2015), Nicco Fertitta (2015), Bubba Bolden (2017), Haskell Garrett (2017), Tate Martell (2017), Tyjon Lindsey (2017), Palaie Gaoteote IV (2018), Cyrus Moss (2022), Jake Taylor (2022), James Carrington (2025) |
| Detroit (MI) Cass Technical | MI | 9 | Dior Mathis (2010), Royce Jenkins-Stone (2012), Damon Webb (2014), Mike Weber (2015), Demetric Vance (2016), Michael Onwenu (2016), Donovan Johnson (2017), Donovan Peoples-Jones (2017), Marcus Jennings (2026) |
| Gardena (CA) Junipero Serra | CA | 9 | Robert Woods (2010), George Farmer (2011), Jason Gibson (2011), Dwight Williams (2014), Rasheem Green (2015), Stanley Norman (2015), LV Bunkley-Shelton (2020), Dakoda Fields (2024), Duvay Williams (2026) |
| Philadelphia (PA) St. Joseph's Prep School | PA | 9 | John Reid (2015), D'Andre Swift (2017), Jeremiah Trotter Jr. (2021), Kyle McCord (2021), Marvin Harrison Jr. (2021), Keenan Nelson Jr. (2022), Josiah Trotter (2023), Omillio Agard (2024), Anthony Sacca (2025) |
| Cibolo (TX) Steele | TX | 8 | Malcolm Brown (2011), Ryan Simmons (2011), Marquis Anderson (2011), Mark Jackson Jr. (2016), Brenden Brady (2018), Caden Sterns (2018), Daniel Jackson (2020), Jonathan Hatton Jr. (2026) |
| Corona (CA) Centennial | CA | 7 | Viane Talamaivao (2014), Javon McKinley (2016), Tanner McKee (2018), Drake Jackson (2019), Gary Bryant Jr. (2020), Korey Foreman (2021), Husan Longstreet (2025) |
| Ellenwood (GA) Cedar Grove | GA | 7 | Johnny McCrary (2013), Bryson Allen-Williams (2014), Antwuan Jackson Jr. (2016), Netori Johnson (2017), Jadon Haselwood (2019), Christen Miller (2022), Kayin Lee (2023) |
| Ramsey (NJ) Don Bosco Prep | NJ | 7 | Darius Hamilton (2012), Elijah Shumate (2012), Leonte Carroo (2012), Yuri Wright (2012), Al-Quadin Muhammad (2013), Jalen Berger (2020), Jordan Thomas (2024) |
| Rancho Santa Margarita (CA) Santa Margarita Catholic | CA | 7 | Max Tuerk (2012), KJ Costello (2016), Kekoa Crawford (2016), Brett Neilon (2017), Hero Kanu (2022), Emmett Mosley (2024), Trent Mosley (2026) |
| Cleveland (OH) Glenville | OH | 6 | Christian Bryant (2010), Latwan Anderson (2010), Aundrey Walker (2011), Erick Smith (2014), Marcelys Jones (2014), Marshon Lattimore (2014) |
| Columbus (GA) Carver | GA | 6 | Mekhi Brown (2015), Jawon Pass (2016), Elijah Pritchett (2022), Darron Reed (2023), Kelton Smith (2023), Tristian Givens (2026) |
| Houston (TX) North Shore | TX | 6 | DeAndrew White (2010), Sedrick Flowers (2011), Zach Whitley (2014), Shadrach Banks (2021), Devin Sanchez (2025), Charles Ross (2025) |
| Jacksonville (FL) Trinity Christian Academy | FL | 6 | Nick Washington (2013), D.J. Matthews Jr. (2017), Shaun Wade (2017), Tyreke Johnson (2018), Fred Davis II (2020), Treyaun Webb (2023) |
| Miami (FL) Miami Central | FL | 6 | Calvin Brewton (2015), Jamel Cook (2016), Amari Daniels (2021), Terrence Lewis (2021), Yulkeith Brown (2021), Amari Wallace (2025) |
| Norcross (GA) Greater Atlanta Christian School | GA | 6 | Darius Slayton (2015), Davis Mills (2017), Kyler McMichael (2018), Christopher Hinton (2019), Myles Hinton (2020), Addison Nichols (2022) |
| Olney (MD) Good Counsel | MD | 6 | Blake Countess (2011), Stefon Diggs (2012), Dorian O'Daniel (2013), Kendall Fuller (2013), Jesse Aniebonam (2014), Landon Tengwall (2021) |
| Powder Springs (GA) McEachern | GA | 6 | Chuma Edoga (2015), TJ Rahming (2015), Taj Griffin (2015), Julian Rochester (2016), Jamil Burroughs (2020), Javon Baker (2020) |
| Thousand Oaks (CA) Oaks Christian | CA | 6 | Cassius Marsh (2010), Malcolm Jones (2010), Ishmael Adams (2012), Jordan Payton (2012), Michael Pittman Jr. (2016), Colby Parkinson (2017) |
| Folsom (CA) Folsom | CA | 5 | Ariel Ngata (2017), Joe Ngata (2019), Rico Flores (2023), Walker Lyons (2023), Vlad Dyakonov (2026) |
| Inglewood (CA) Inglewood | CA | 5 | Derrick Woods (2012), Clint Stephens (2022), Justyn Martin (2022), Taariq Al-Uqdah (2022), Jamari Johnson (2023) |
| Long Beach (CA) Long Beach Poly | CA | 5 | JoJo Wicker (2015), Jack Jones (2016), Jalen Hall (2018), Matt Corral (2018), Tyson Ruffins (2023) |
| Marietta (GA) Marietta | GA | 5 | Azeez Ojulari (2018), Ramel Keyton (2019), Arik Gilbert (2020), Harrison Bailey (2020), Daniel Martin (2022) |
| Marietta (GA) Walton | GA | 5 | Brandon Kublanow (2013), Tyren Jones (2013), Dominick Blaylock (2019), Marcus Allen (2022), Daniel Calhoun (2024) |
| Missouri City (TX) Elkins | TX | 5 | Jake Matthews (2010), Mike Matthews (2012), Ross Blacklock (2016), Luke Matthews (2018), Romin Seymour (2025) |
| Naples (FL) Naples | FL | 5 | Tyler Byrd (2016), Chez Mellusi (2019), Devin Moore (2022), Jonas Duclona (2023), Kensley Faustin (2024) |
| Palm Beach Gardens (FL) Dwyer | FL | 5 | Gerald Christian (2010), Matt Elam (2010), Jacoby Brissett (2011), Nick O'Leary (2011), Johnnie Dixon (2014) |
| Scottsdale (AZ) Saguaro | AZ | 5 | Byron Murphy (2016), KJ Jarrell (2017), Kelee Ringo (2020), Bram Walden (2021), Quintin Somerville (2021) |
| Suwanee (GA) North Gwinnett | GA | 5 | Dante Sawyer (2014), Mitch Hyatt (2015), Josh Downs (2020), Barrett Carter (2021), Jordan Hancock (2021) |
| Venice (FL) Venice | FL | 5 | Omari Phillips (2012), Damon Wilson (2023), Charles Lester III (2024), Winston Watkins Jr. (2025), Asharri Charles (2026) |
| Apopka (FL) Apopka | FL | 4 | Ty Darlington (2012), Chandler Cox (2015), Martez Ivey (2015), William Barnes (2018) |
| Bellaire (TX) Episcopal | TX | 4 | Walker Little (2017), Jaylen Waddle (2018), Donovan Jackson (2021), Morrow Evans (2024) |
| Chatsworth (CA) Sierra Canyon | CA | 4 | Kanan Ray (2017), Xavier Jordan (2024), Havon Finney (2026), Brandon Lockhart (2026) |
| Concord (CA) De La Salle | CA | 4 | Devin Asiasi (2016), Henry To'o To'o (2019), Isaiah Foskey (2019), Zeke Berry (2022) |
| Coppell (TX) Coppell | TX | 4 | Nick Jordan (2012), Solomon Thomas (2014), Braxton Myers (2023), Nicolas Radicic (2023) |
| Douglasville (GA) Douglas County | GA | 4 | Aaron Gregory (2025), Devin Carter (2025), Joshua Sam-Epelle (2026), Aaron Gregory (2026) |
| Harbor City (CA) Narbonne | CA | 4 | Sean Parker (2010), Raymond Scott (2018), Jonah Tauanu'u (2019), Darion Green-Warren (2020) |
| Littleton (CO) Valor Christian | CO | 4 | Christian McCaffrey (2014), Dylan McCaffrey (2017), Roger Rosengarten (2020), Gavin Sawchuk (2022) |
| Loganville (GA) Grayson | GA | 4 | Griffin Scroggs (2022), Michael Daugherty (2023), Waltclaire Flynn Jr. (2024), Tyler Atkinson (2025) |
| Los Angeles (CA) Loyola | CA | 4 | Anthony Barr (2010), Christian Rector (2015), David Long (2016), Ceyair Wright (2021) |
| Louisville (KY) Trinity | KY | 4 | James Quick (2013), Jason Hatcher (2013), Rondale Moore (2018), Allen Evans (2026) |
| Miami (FL) Columbus | FL | 4 | Deon Bush (2012), Xzavier Henderson (2020), Ryan Rodriguez (2021), Dylan Stephenson (2024) |
| Miami (FL) Northwestern | FL | 4 | Teddy Bridgewater (2011), Deandre Baker (2015), James Cook (2018), Calvin Russell (2025) |
| Mission Viejo (CA) Mission Viejo | CA | 4 | Tre Madden (2011), Dijon Lee (2025), Phillip Bell (2025), JD Hill (2026) |
| Portland (OR) Central Catholic | OR | 4 | Brennan Scarlett (2011), Alex Balducci (2012), Connor Humphreys (2014), Zac Stascausky (2025) |
| Oradell (NJ) Bergen Catholic | NJ | 4 | Jordan Morant (2020), Nyier Daniels (2024), Quincy Porter (2025), Jordan Thomas (2026) |
| Rock Hill (SC) South Pointe | SC | 4 | BT Potter (2018), Derion Kendrick (2018), J'Zavien Currence (2025), Seth Tillman (2026) |
| Saint Louis (MO) DeSmet | MO | 4 | Durron Neal (2012), Jordan Johnson (2020), JK Johnson (2021), Titan Davis (2026) |
| Salt Lake City (UT) Brighton | UT | 4 | Ricky Heimuli (2010), Osa Masina (2015), Simi Fehoko (2016), Lander Barton (2022) |
| Sammamish (WA) Eastside Catholic | WA | 4 | Ayden Hector (2020), Gee Scott Jr. (2020), Sam Adams II (2020), J.T. Tuimoloau (2021) |
| San Antonio (TX) Madison | TX | 4 | Nate Askew (2010), Aaron Green (2011), Jordan Clay (2025), Jordan Clay (2026) |
| Tampa (FL) Plant | FL | 4 | James Wilder (2011), Phillip Ely (2011), Jake Fruhmorgen (2015), William Putnam (2019) |
| Temple (TX) Temple | TX | 4 | Lache Seastrunk (2010), Mikal Harrison-Pilot (2023), Jamarion Carlton (2025), Jamarion Carlton (2026) |
| Warner Robins (GA) Warner Robins | GA | 4 | Jeffrey Whitaker (2010), Marquez Callaway (2016), Tyler Fromm (2019), Vic Burley (2023) |
| West Chester (OH) Lakota West | OH | 4 | Alex Afari (2022), Jyaire Brown (2022), Tegra Tshabola (2022), Malik Hartford (2023) |
| Arlington (TX) Mansfield Timberview | TX | 3 | Brandon Simmons (2014), Ed Paris (2014), Jalen Kimber (2020) |
| Atlanta (GA) Pace Academy | GA | 3 | Andrew Thomas (2017), Jamaree Salyer (2018), Hevin Brown-Shuler (2024) |
| Brentwood (TN) Brentwood Academy | TN | 3 | Graham Shuler (2012), Jalen Ramsey (2013), Kenneth Simon II (2026) |
| Canton (GA) Sequoyah | GA | 3 | Jackson Hancock (2024), Will Rajecki (2026), Alexander Brewer (2026) |
| Carthage (TX) Carthage | TX | 3 | Kendall Thompson (2011), Edward Pope (2012), Kash Courtney (2025) |
| Chandler (AZ) Hamilton | AZ | 3 | Tyler Johnstone (2011), Garrett Rand (2016), Will Mencl (2026) |
| Charlotte (NC) Mallard Creek | NC | 3 | D.J. Humphries (2012), Marquez North (2013), Josh Brown (2016) |
| Cheshire (CT) Cheshire Academy | CT | 3 | Tarik Black (2017), Josh Jobe (2018), Luke Reynolds (2024) |
| Cincinnati (OH) Taft | OH | 3 | Adolphus Washington (2012), Dwayne Stanford (2012), Monsanna Torbert Jr. (2026) |
| Cornelius (NC) William Amos Hough | NC | 3 | Mark Fields (2015), Nolan Groulx (2019), Evan Pryor (2021) |
| Daytona Beach (FL) Mainland | FL | 3 | D'Marcus Adams (2018), LJ McCray (2024), Zavier Mincey (2024) |
| Detroit (MI) Martin Luther King | MI | 3 | Lavert Hill (2016), Ambry Thomas (2017), Dante Moore (2023) |
| Draper (UT) Corner Canyon | UT | 3 | Van Fillinger (2020), Devin Brown (2022), Jerome Myles (2025) |
| East Saint Louis (IL) East St. Louis | IL | 3 | Glenn Faulkner (2011), Antonio Johnson (2020), Toriano Pride (2022) |
| Edwardsville (IL) Edwardsville | IL | 3 | Rodney Coe (2011), A.J. Epenesa (2017), Iose Epenesa (2025) |
| Frankfort (IL) Lincoln-Way East | IL | 3 | Nick Allegretti (2014), A.J. Henning (2020), Trey Serauskis (2026) |
| Hollywood (FL) Chaminade-Madonna Prep | FL | 3 | Khairi Clark (2014), Keontra Smith (2019), Zaquan Patterson (2024) |
| Honolulu (HI) St. Louis | HI | 3 | Juda Parker (2011), Tua Tagovailoa (2017), Faatui Tuitele (2019) |
| Hyattsville (MD) DeMatha Catholic | MD | 3 | Arie Kouandjio (2010), Chase Young (2017), Nick Cross (2019) |
| Indianapolis (IN) Lawrence Central | IN | 3 | Darrin Kirkland Jr. (2015), Cameron McGrone (2018), Joshua Mickens (2023) |
| Indianapolis (IN) Warren Central | IN | 3 | David Bell (2019), Sean Fox (2026), JJ Finch (2026) |
| Jersey City (NJ) St. Peters Prep | NJ | 3 | Jayson Ademilola (2018), Shayne Simon (2018), Cody Simon (2020) |
| Lakewood (WA) Lakes | WA | 3 | Sione Potoa'e (2010), Cedric Dozier (2012), Zach Banner (2012) |
| Manor (TX) Manor | TX | 3 | Erick Fowler (2016), Princewill Umanmielen (2023), Quinten Joyner (2023) |
| Meridian (MS) Meridian | MS | 3 | C.J. Hampton (2014), Raekwon Davis (2016), Daniel Hill (2024) |
| Miami (FL) Miami Palmetto | FL | 3 | Brashard Smith (2021), Corey Collier (2021), Leonard Taylor (2021) |
| Mission Hills (CA) Bishop Alemany | CA | 3 | Jaylin Smith (2021), Larry Turner-Gooden (2022), Niuafe Tuihalamaka (2022) |
| Moultrie (GA) Colquitt County | GA | 3 | J.J. Peterson (2018), Landen Thomas (2024), Ny Carr (2024) |
| Murfreesboro (TN) Oakland | TN | 3 | Josh Smith (2015), Jordan James (2022), Joel Wyatt (2026) |
| Norcross (GA) Norcross | GA | 3 | Kevin Mouhon (2014), Myles Autry (2014), Lawson Luckie (2023) |
| Orange (CA) Orange Lutheran | CA | 3 | Keisean Lucier-South (2015), Kyle Ford (2019), Ryan Hilinski (2019) |
| Orem (UT) Orem | UT | 3 | Puka Nacua (2019), Noah Sewell (2020), Kingsley Suamataia (2021) |
| Orlando (FL) Dr. Phillips | FL | 3 | Dee Hart (2011), DeMario Tolan (2022), Payton Kirkland (2023) |
| Orlando (FL) The First Academy | FL | 3 | Devin Jackson (2026), Danny Odem (2026), Reed Ramsier (2026) |
| Philadelphia (PA) Imhotep Institute | PA | 3 | Enai White (2022), Keon Wylie (2022), Semaj Bridgeman (2023) |
| Pompano Beach (FL) Coconut Creek | FL | 3 | Malek Young (2016), Trayvon Mullen (2016), Trevell Mullen (2022) |
| Princeton (NJ) Hun School | NJ | 3 | Caedan Wallace (2019), Jacob Allen (2022), Luke Wafle (2026) |
| Sacramento (CA) Grant Union | CA | 3 | James Sample (2011), Viliami Moala (2011), Shaq Thompson (2012) |
| Sammamish (WA) Skyline | WA | 3 | Jake Heaps (2010), Kasen Williams (2011), Max Browne (2013) |
| San Diego (CA) Francis Parker School | CA | 3 | Matt Wile (2011), Zach Schmid (2014), Ryan Sanborn (2019) |
| Shreveport (LA) Evangel Christian Academy | LA | 3 | Jermauria Rasco (2011), Jerry Tillery (2015), Micah Baskerville (2018) |
| Tucson (AZ) Salpointe Catholic | AZ | 3 | Bijan Robinson (2020), Lathan Ransom (2020), Elijah Rushing (2024) |
| Tulsa (OK) Booker T. Washington | OK | 3 | Calvin Barnett (2010), Daxton Hill (2019), Gentry Williams (2022) |
| Virginia Beach (VA) Ocean Lakes | VA | 3 | Eli Harold (2012), Derrick Nnadi (2014), Jason Lewis (2015) |
| West Roxbury (MA) Catholic Memorial | MA | 3 | Boubacar Traore (2023), Jaedn Skeete (2023), Guerby Lambert (2024) |
| Westlake Village (CA) Oaks Christian | CA | 3 | Bo Calvert (2018), Brenden Segovia (2021), Deshonne Redeaux (2026) |
| Woodberry Forest (VA) Woodberry Forest | VA | 3 | Doug Randolph (2013), Clark Yarbrough (2016), Kyle Bilodeau (2019) |
| Zachary (LA) Zachary | LA | 3 | Chris Hilton (2021), Eli Holstein (2023), Trey'Dez Green (2024) |
| Zionsville (IN) Zionsville | IN | 3 | Blake Lueders (2010), Gus Hartwig (2020), Joey Tanona (2022) |
| Alabaster (AL) Thompson | AL | 2 | Taulia Tagovailoa (2019), John Alan McGuire (2025) |
| Aledo (TX) Aledo | TX | 2 | Chuck Filiaga (2017), Hauss Hejny (2024) |
| Allen (TX) Allen | TX | 2 | Cedric Ogbuehi (2010), EJ Ndoma-Ogar (2019) |
| American Fork (UT) American Fork | UT | 2 | Ryker Mathews (2011), Hunter Clegg (2023) |
| Anaheim (CA) Servite | CA | 2 | Travis Jonsen (2015), Tetairoa McMillan (2022) |
| Arlington (TX) Lamar | TX | 2 | Blake Ford (2022), Isaiah Robinson (2023) |
| Ashburn (VA) Stone Bridge | VA | 2 | Jonathan Allen (2013), Ryan Burns (2013) |
| Athens (TX) Athens | TX | 2 | Kendall Sanders (2012), Garrett Hayes (2020) |
| Atlanta (GA) Douglass | GA | 2 | Garrison Smith (2010), Jontae Gilbert (2025) |
| Atlanta (GA) Marist School | GA | 2 | Kyle Hamilton (2019), Drew Prieto (2023) |
| Atlanta (GA) Mays | GA | 2 | Dallas Warmack (2015), Natrez Patrick (2015) |
| Atlanta (GA) St. Pius X | GA | 2 | Geno Smith (2012), Nick Ruffin (2014) |
| Austin (TX) Lake Travis | TX | 2 | Garrett Wilson (2019), Caleb Burton (2022) |
| Avon (IN) Avon | IN | 2 | Brandon Peters (2016), Blake Fisher (2021) |
| Baton Rouge (LA) Southern Lab | LA | 2 | Kardell Thomas (2019), Tyrion Davis-Price (2019) |
| Baton Rouge (LA) University Lab | LA | 2 | Christian Harris (2019), Jardin Gilbert (2021) |
| Bellevue (WA) Bellevue | WA | 2 | Budda Baker (2014), Henry Roberts (2015) |
| Birmingham (AL) Jackson-Olin | AL | 2 | T.D. Moultry (2017), Quandarrius Robinson (2020) |
| Bogart (GA) Prince Avenue Christian School | GA | 2 | Brock Vandagriff (2021), Andrew Beard (2026) |
| Brentwood (TN) Ravenwood | TN | 2 | Van Jefferson (2015), Junior Colson (2021) |
| Brooklyn (NY) Erasmus Hall | NY | 2 | Curtis Samuel (2014), Armon Bethea (2021) |
| Cape Coral (FL) Island Coast | FL | 2 | Aaron Lynch (2011), Jordan Diggs (2012) |
| Carmel (IN) Carmel | IN | 2 | Austin Roberts (2014), Jackson Lloyd (2025) |
| Chandler (AZ) Basha | AZ | 2 | Cole Martin (2023), Jake Hildebrand (2026) |
| Chandler (AZ) Chandler | AZ | 2 | Chase Lucas (2016), Kyion Grayes (2022) |
| Charlotte (NC) Myers Park | NC | 2 | Miller Snyder (2011), Moose Muhammad III (2020) |
| Charlotte (NC) Phillip O. Berry Academy | NC | 2 | Germone Hopper (2012), Nick Dawson (2012) |
| Charlotte (NC) Providence Day School | NC | 2 | Jadyn Davis (2024), David Sanders Jr. (2025) |
| Chattanooga (TN) Baylor School | TN | 2 | Cameron Sparks (2025), Briggs Cherry (2026) |
| Chicago (IL) Simeon | IL | 2 | Malik Elzy (2023), Christopher Burgess Jr. (2025) |
| Cincinnati (OH) Princeton | OH | 2 | Spencer Ware (2010), Paris Johnson Jr. (2020) |
| Cincinnati (OH) St. Xavier | OH | 2 | Matt James (2010), Justin Hilliard (2015) |
| Clayton (NC) Clayton | NC | 2 | Mitch Hall (2017), Keshawn Stancil (2026) |
| Cleveland (OH) Cleveland Heights | OH | 2 | Kyle Dodson (2012), Shelton Gibson (2013) |
| Cleveland (OH) St. Ignatius | OH | 2 | Dre'Mont Jones (2015), Darian Kinnard (2018) |
| Clinton (NC) Clinton | NC | 2 | Mohamed Kaba (2020), Amaris Williams (2024) |
| Council Bluffs (IA) Lewis Central | IA | 2 | Logan Jones (2020), Thomas Fidone (2021) |
| Crawfordville (FL) Wakulla | FL | 2 | Feleipe Franks (2016), Keyshawn Greene (2020) |
| Cumming (GA) West Forsyth | GA | 2 | Dylan Fairchild (2021), Oscar Delp (2022) |
| Danville (CA) San Ramon Valley | CA | 2 | Tristan Sinclair (2019), Marco Jones (2025) |
| Dayton (OH) Centerville | OH | 2 | Michael Bennett (2011), Evan Lisle (2013) |
| Decatur (GA) Decatur | GA | 2 | Kenric Lanier (2023), Ethan Johnson (2025) |
| Denton (TX) Guyer | TX | 2 | J.W. Walsh (2011), Jerrod Heard (2014) |
| Denton (TX) Ryan | TX | 2 | Earnest Brown (2017), Anthony Hill (2023) |
| DeSoto (TX) DeSoto | TX | 2 | Shawn Robinson (2017), SaRod Baker (2026) |
| Downey (CA) Downey | CA | 2 | Jabari Ruffin (2012), Aidan Chiles (2023) |
| Duncan (SC) Byrnes | SC | 2 | Brandon Willis (2010), Marcus Lattimore (2010) |
| Encino (CA) Crespi | CA | 2 | Jordan Simmons (2012), Marvell Tell III (2015) |
| Englewood (CO) Cherry Creek | CO | 2 | Nate Starks (2014), George Fitzpatrick (2022) |
| Enterprise (AL) Enterprise | AL | 2 | Eric Winters (2025), Zion Grady (2025) |
| Fairburn (GA) Langston Hughes | GA | 2 | D'Andre Walker (2015), Air Noland (2024) |
| Flower Mound (TX) Marcus | TX | 2 | Keaton Sutherland (2015), Marcel Brooks (2019) |
| Forney (TX) Forney | TX | 2 | Aaron Flowers (2024), Mason Joshua (2026) |
| Fort Lauderdale (FL) Coconut Creek | FL | 2 | Binjimen Victor (2016), Tiawan Mullen (2019) |
| Fort Lauderdale (FL) Dillard | FL | 2 | Wayne Lyons (2011), Nyjalik Kelly (2022) |
| Fresno (CA) Central East | CA | 2 | Jaylon Johnson (2017), Xavier Worthy (2021) |
| Gaffney (SC) Gaffney | SC | 2 | Shaq Davidson (2014), Tyrion Ingram-Dawkins (2021) |
| Gibsonia (PA) Pine-Richland | PA | 2 | Phil Jurkovec (2018), Andrew Kristofic (2019) |
| Gilbert (AZ) Williams Field | AZ | 2 | Brandon Ruiz (2017), Noa Pola-Gates (2019) |
| Gilmer (TX) Gilmer | TX | 2 | Blake Lynch (2015), Kris Boyd (2015) |
| Goose Creek (SC) Goose Creek | SC | 2 | Brandon Shell (2011), Javon Kinlaw (2016) |
| Grand Rapids (MI) Catholic Central | MI | 2 | Jalen Mayfield (2018), Nolan Ziegler (2022) |
| Hinsdale (IL) Hinsdale Central | IL | 2 | Brian Allen (2014), Micah Drescher (2026) |
| Hollywood (FL) Miramar | FL | 2 | Ivan McCartney (2010), Tracy Howard (2012) |
| Honolulu (HI) Kamehameha | HI | 2 | Adam Stack (2017), Malakai Lee (2026) |
| Hoover (AL) Hoover | AL | 2 | Carter Short (2021), Bradley Shaw (2024) |
| Hoschton (GA) Mill Creek | GA | 2 | Kaleb Kim (2015), Caleb Downs (2023) |
| Houston (TX) Dekaney | TX | 2 | Trey Williams (2012), Marcus Banks (2019) |
| Houston (TX) Lamar | TX | 2 | Anthony Cook (2018), Dramodd Odoms (2025) |
| Houston (TX) Westside | TX | 2 | Frank Iheanacho (2014), Jordan Elliott (2016) |
| Huntington (WV) Spring Valley | WV | 2 | Doug Nester (2019), Wyatt Milum (2021) |
| Indianapolis (IN) Ben Davis | IN | 2 | Antonio Allen (2013), Asmar Bilal (2015) |
| Jacksonville (FL) The Bolles School | FL | 2 | Brooks Abbott (2012), John Theus (2012) |
| Jacksonville (FL) Mandarin | FL | 2 | Jaime Ffrench (2025), Hylton Stubbs (2025) |
| Jasper (TX) Jasper | TX | 2 | Terrell Cuney (2014), Kiotti Armstrong (2025) |
| Katy (TX) Katy | TX | 2 | Kyle Porter (2016), Coen Echols (2024) |
| Kennesaw (GA) North Cobb | GA | 2 | De'Nylon Morrissette (2022), Samuel Mbake (2022) |
| La Puente (CA) Bishop Amat | CA | 2 | Trevon Sidney (2016), Tyler Vaughns (2016) |
| Lafayette (LA) Lafayette Christian Academy | LA | 2 | Sage Ryan (2021), Jordan Allen (2022) |
| Lake City (FL) Columbia | FL | 2 | Timmy Jernigan (2011), Laremy Tunsil (2013) |
| Leesburg (GA) Lee County | GA | 2 | Aubrey Solomon (2017), Jaden Upshaw (2026) |
| Los Alamitos (CA) Los Alamitos | CA | 2 | Blake Johnson (2015), Kamar Mothudi (2024) |
| Los Angeles (CA) Cathedral | CA | 2 | Hunter Echols (2017), Jamire Calvin (2017) |
| Los Angeles (CA) Hawkins | CA | 2 | Greg Johnson (2017), Joseph Lewis (2017) |
| Lucedale (MS) George County | MS | 2 | McKinnley Jackson (2020), Deuce Knight (2025) |
| Mableton (GA) Pebblebrook | GA | 2 | Tyler Scott (2023), Dwight Phillips Jr. (2024) |
| Matthews (NC) Butler | NC | 2 | Kris Frost (2011), Peter Kalambayi (2013) |
| Marietta (GA) Sprayberry | GA | 2 | Rodrigo Blankenship (2015), Jorden Edmonds (2025) |
| Marion (MA) Tabor Academy | MA | 2 | Peter Bourque (2026), Carter Gooden (2026) |
| McDonough (GA) Eagles Landing Christian Academy | GA | 2 | Avery Sebastian (2011), DJ Chester (2023) |
| Memphis (TN) East | TN | 2 | Brian Kimbrow (2012), Christian Morris (2013) |
| Menlo Park (CA) Menlo-Atherton | CA | 2 | Troy Franklin (2021), Jurrion Dickey (2023) |
| Merrillville (IN) Andrean | IN | 2 | Josh Barajas (2015), Drayk Bowen (2023) |
| Miami (FL) Booker T. Washington | FL | 2 | Treon Harris (2014), Devonaire Clarington (2015) |
| Miami (FL) Edison | FL | 2 | Francois Nolton Jr. (2022), Nathaniel Joseph (2023) |
| Miami (FL) Gulliver Prep | FL | 2 | Donell Harris (2020), Jalen Brown (2023) |
| Miami (FL) Norland | FL | 2 | Keith Brown (2012), Jamari Howard (2024) |
| Miami (FL) Westminster Christian School | FL | 2 | Jordan Cronkrite (2015), Tim Irvin (2015) |
| Mililani (HI) Mililani | HI | 2 | Vavae Malepeai (2016), Wynden Ho'ohuli (2021) |
| Milwaukee (WI) Whitefish Bay | WI | 2 | Will Hagerup (2010), Joe Brunner (2022) |
| Missouri City (TX) Hightower | TX | 2 | Bralon Addison (2012), Kade Phillips (2025) |
| Mobile (AL) St. Paul's Episcopal | AL | 2 | Jalyn Armour-Davis (2018), Brady Ward (2020) |
| Montgomery (AL) Carver | AL | 2 | Jeremy Johnson (2013), Shaun Dion Hamilton (2014) |
| Nappanee (IN) Northwood | IN | 2 | Jo'Ziah Edmond (2024), NiTareon Tuggle (2024) |
| Nashville (TN) Ensworth | TN | 2 | Rico McGraw (2015), Key Lawrence (2020) |
| Nashville (TN) Pearl-Cohn | TN | 2 | Antonio Richardson (2011), Barion Brown (2022) |
| Newhall (CA) Hart | CA | 2 | Brady White (2015), Trent Irwin (2015) |
| Norfolk (VA) Maury | VA | 2 | KeAndre Lambert-Smith (2020), Fred Johnson (2024) |
| Oak Park (IL) Fenwick | IL | 2 | Nathaniel Marshall (2025), Noah Sur (2026) |
| Oakland (CA) Bishop O'Dowd | CA | 2 | Milo Eifler (2016), Austin Jones (2019) |
| Olive Branch (MS) Olive Branch | MS | 2 | Damien Robinson (2010), Shon Coleman (2010) |
| Owings Mills (MD) McDonogh School | MD | 2 | Dani Dennis-Sutton (2022), Brandon Finney (2025) |
| Orchard Lake (MI) St. Mary's | MI | 2 | James Ross (2012), Tommy Doman (2021) |
| Orlando (FL) Boone | FL | 2 | Johnny Townsend (2013), Tommy Townsend (2015) |
| Owasso (OK) Owasso | OK | 2 | Josh Proctor (2018), Chris McClellan (2022) |
| Pearland (TX) Shadow Creek | TX | 2 | Xavion Alford (2020), Maurice Williams Jr. (2024) |
| Petal (MS) Petal | MS | 2 | Anthony Alford (2012), Javon Patterson (2015) |
| Phenix City (AL) Central | AL | 2 | AJ Harris (2023), Tomarrion Parker (2023) |
| Phoenix (AZ) Mountain Pointe | AZ | 2 | Jalen Brown (2014), Natrell Curtis (2014) |
| Phoenix (AZ) Pinnacle | AZ | 2 | Spencer Rattler (2019), Tosh Baker (2020) |
| Pickerington (OH) Pickerington North | OH | 2 | Jake Butt (2013), Jack Sawyer (2021) |
| Pocatello (ID) Highland | ID | 2 | Tristen Hoge (2015), Tommy Togiai (2018) |
| Port Arthur (TX) Memorial | TX | 2 | Jaylon Guilbeau (2022), JaMarquis Hudson (2026) |
| Portland (OR) Jesuit | OR | 2 | Keanon Lowe (2010), Trey Lowe (2018) |
| Prattville (AL) Prattville | AL | 2 | Justin Shanks (2012), Austin Golson (2013) |
| Richmond (VA) Hermitage | VA | 2 | Curtis Grant (2011), Derrick Green (2013) |
| Rockwall (TX) Rockwall | TX | 2 | Chris Warren III (2015), Jaxon Smith-Njigba (2020) |
| Rosharon (TX) Iowa Colony | TX | 2 | Jayden Warren (2026), Carson White (2026) |
| Saint Louis (MO) Christian Brothers College | MO | 2 | Brian Wallace (2014), Kamryn Babb (2018) |
| Saint Louis (MO) Lutheran North | MO | 2 | Ronnie Perkins (2018), Antonio Doyle (2020) |
| Saline (MI) Saline | MI | 2 | Joe Boisture (2010), CJ Carr (2024) |
| Salt Lake City (UT) East | UT | 2 | Junior Angilau (2018), Siaki Ika (2019) |
| San Antonio (TX) Central Catholic | TX | 2 | Ben Rios (2022), Deandre Marshall (2022) |
| San Antonio (TX) Sam Houston | TX | 2 | Quincy Russell (2011), Javonte Magee (2012) |
| San Clemente (CA) San Clemente | CA | 2 | Kyle Murphy (2012), Sam Darnold (2015) |
| Scottsdale (AZ) Desert Mountain | AZ | 2 | Kyle Allen (2014), Mark Andrews (2014) |
| Seattle (WA) O'Dea | WA | 2 | Isendre Ahfua (2024), Jason Brown (2024) |
| Seattle (WA) Rainier Beach | WA | 2 | Josh Conerly Jr. (2022), Caleb Presley (2023) |
| Seguin (TX) Seguin | TX | 2 | Joseph Cheek (2011), Corey Dailey (2026) |
| Shelby (NC) Crest | NC | 2 | Jonathan Bullard (2012), Justin Foster (2017) |
| Shreveport (LA) Calvary Baptist Academy | LA | 2 | Chanse Sylvie (2016), Devin Harper (2025) |
| Sicklerville (NJ) Timber Creek | NJ | 2 | Kareem Ali (2015), Cameron Chambers (2016) |
| South Jordan (UT) Bingham | UT | 2 | Harvey Langi (2011), Jay Tufele (2017) |
| Spring (TX) Klein Collins | TX | 2 | Charles Jackson (2011), Garrett Greenlea (2011) |
| Spring Branch (TX) Smithson Valley | TX | 2 | Ethan Perry (2012), Colton Thomasson (2023) |
| Stone Mountain (GA) Stephenson | GA | 2 | Mike Davis (2012), Raphael Kirby (2012) |
| Tampa (FL) Tampa Catholic | FL | 2 | Christian Green (2010), TJ Moore (2024) |
| Tarpon Springs (FL) East Lake | FL | 2 | Artavis Scott (2014), Mason Cole (2014) |
| Texarkana (TX) Texas High | TX | 2 | John Michael McGee (2012), Clayton Smith (2021) |
| Theodore (AL) Theodore | AL | 2 | C.J. Mosley (2010), JJ Bush (2026) |
| Thibodaux (LA) Thibodaux | LA | 2 | Trovon Reed (2010), Greg Robinson (2011) |
| Tucker (GA) Tucker | GA | 2 | Elisha Shaw (2014), Josh Vann (2018) |
| Tyrone (GA) Sandy Creek | GA | 2 | Demarre Kitt (2014), Brian Branch (2020) |
| Valdosta (GA) Lowndes | GA | 2 | Josh Harvey-Clemons (2012), Dyshon Sims (2014) |
| Valdosta (GA) Valdosta | GA | 2 | Tate Rodemaker (2020), Todd Robinson (2025) |
| Ventura (CA) St. Bonaventure | CA | 2 | Bryce Dixon (2014), Ricky Town (2015) |
| Vero Beach (FL) Vero Beach | FL | 2 | Keanu Koht (2021), Tarvos Alford (2025) |
| Warner Robins (GA) Houston County | GA | 2 | Jake Fromm (2017), Trey Hill (2018) |
| Washington (DC) Gonzaga | DC | 2 | Caleb Williams (2021), Kainoa Winston (2025) |
| Watkinsville (GA) Oconee County | GA | 2 | Jaleel Laguins (2016), Whit Weeks (2023) |
| Waxahachie (TX) Waxahachie | TX | 2 | Demani Richardson (2019), Calvin Simpson-Hunt (2023) |
| West Des Moines (IA) Valley | IA | 2 | Jake Campos (2013), John Raridon (2016) |
| Westwood (NJ) Old Tappan | NJ | 2 | Devin Fuller (2012), Jordan Fuller (2016) |
| Wilmette (IL) Loyola Academy | IL | 2 | Chance Carter (2010), John Shannon (2016) |
| Winnetka (IL) New Trier | IL | 2 | David Davidkov (2021), Nikola Dugandzic (2025) |
| Woodbridge (VA) C. D. Hylton | VA | 2 | E.J. Levenberry (2013), Matthew Burrell (2015) |
| Wylie (TX) Wylie East | TX | 2 | Eno Benjamin (2017), Anthony James (2023) |
| Abilene (TX) Abilene | TX | 1 | Herschel Sims (2011) |
| Absecon (NJ) Holy Spirit | NJ | 1 | Anthony Sarao (2011) |
| Acworth (GA) Kennesaw Mountain | GA | 1 | Connor Lew (2023) |
| Acworth (GA) North Cobb | GA | 1 | Marquis Groves-Killebrew (2022) |
| Addison (TX) Greenhill School | TX | 1 | Noah Piper (2025) |
| Ainsworth (NE) Ainsworth | NE | 1 | Carter Nelson (2024) |
| Akron (OH) Archbishop Hoban | OH | 1 | Sam Greer (2026) |
| Akron (OH) St. Vincent-St. Mary | OH | 1 | Dante Booker (2014) |
| Albany (GA) Westover | GA | 1 | Trenton Thompson (2015) |
| Albuquerque (NM) La Cueva | NM | 1 | Mason Posa (2025) |
| Alexandria (KY) Covington Catholic | KY | 1 | Michael Mayer (2020) |
| Alexandria (LA) Alexandria | LA | 1 | Jacobian Guillory (2020) |
| Alexandria (VA) Lake Braddock | VA | 1 | Caleb Henderson (2014) |
| Aliso Viejo (CA) Aliso Niguel | CA | 1 | Kurt Chesney (2022) |
| Alliance (OH) Marlington | OH | 1 | Dymonte Thomas (2013) |
| Alpharetta (GA) Denmark | GA | 1 | Shamurad Umarov (2023) |
| Alpharetta (GA) Johns Creek | GA | 1 | Terian Williams II (2022) |
| Alpharetta (GA) Milton | GA | 1 | Paul Tchio (2020) |
| Altoona (IA) Southeast Polk | IA | 1 | Xavier Nwankpa (2022) |
| Amite (LA) Amite | LA | 1 | DeVonta Smith (2017) |
| Anderson (SC) T L Hanna | SC | 1 | Martavis Bryant (2010) |
| Ann Arbor (MI) Skyline | MI | 1 | Daelin Hayes (2016) |
| Annapolis (MD) Annapolis Christian Academy | MD | 1 | Demetrius Johnson (2014) |
| Antioch (CA) Antioch | CA | 1 | Najee Harris (2017) |
| Apple Valley (CA) Apple Valley | CA | 1 | Jayden Denegal (2022) |
| Arlington (TX) Sam Houston | TX | 1 | Tony Morales (2011) |
| Arlington (TX) The Oakridge School | TX | 1 | Ross Apo (2010) |
| Arlington Heights (IL) St. Viator | IL | 1 | Cole Kmet (2017) |
| Arvada (CO) Pomona | CO | 1 | Jake Moretti (2017) |
| Ashburn (VA) Briar Woods | VA | 1 | Alex Carter (2012) |
| Ashburn (VA) Broad Run | VA | 1 | Alex Birchmeier (2023) |
| Ashdown (AR) Ashdown | AR | 1 | Montaric Brown (2017) |
| Asheville (NC) Asheville | NC | 1 | Jeoffrey Pagan (2011) |
| Athens (GA) Athens Academy | GA | 1 | Deion Colzie (2021) |
| Atlanta (GA) Booker T. Washington | GA | 1 | Kameryn Fountain (2024) |
| Atlanta (GA) Grady | GA | 1 | Damian Swann (2011) |
| Atlanta (GA) Westlake | GA | 1 | Nate Wiggins (2021) |
| Atwater (CA) Buhach Colony | CA | 1 | Aziz Shittu (2012) |
| Auburn (AL) Auburn | AL | 1 | Mohamoud Diabate (2019) |
| Aurora (CO) Grandview | CO | 1 | Chris Martin (2010) |
| Aurora (NE) Aurora | NE | 1 | Andrew Rodriguez (2010) |
| Austin (TX) Akins | TX | 1 | Nikolas Hall (2022) |
| Austin (TX) Westlake | TX | 1 | Cade Klubnik (2022) |
| Avon (CT) Avon Old Farms | CT | 1 | Benedict Umeh (2024) |
| Aztec (NM) Aztec | NM | 1 | Matt Hegarty (2011) |
| Bainbridge (GA) Bainbridge | GA | 1 | Smoke Bouie (2022) |
| Bakersfield (CA) Centennial | CA | 1 | Cody Kessler (2011) |
| Bakersfield (CA) Frontier | CA | 1 | Matt Darr (2010) |
| Baldwin (WI) Baldwin-Woodville | WI | 1 | Jake Keefer (2011) |
| Baltimore (MD) Mount Saint Joseph | MD | 1 | Don'te Thornton (2021) |
| Barnesville (GA) Lamar County Comprehensive | GA | 1 | CJ Allen (2023) |
| Barrington (IL) Barrington | IL | 1 | Dan Voltz (2012) |
| Bassfield (MS) Bassfield | MS | 1 | Jamal Peters (2015) |
| Bastrop (TX) Cedar Creek | TX | 1 | Alfred Collins (2020) |
| Batesville (MS) South Panola | MS | 1 | Nickolas Brassell (2011) |
| Baton Rouge (LA) Catholic | LA | 1 | Derrius Guice (2015) |
| Baton Rouge (LA) Dunham School | LA | 1 | Derek Stingley (2019) |
| Baton Rouge (LA) Madison Prep Academy | LA | 1 | Quency Wiggins (2022) |
| Baton Rouge (LA) Scotlandville Magnet | LA | 1 | Kelvin Joseph (2018) |
| Battle Creek (MI) Battle Creek Central | MI | 1 | Brandon Randle (2016) |
| Baytown (TX) Lee | TX | 1 | Trudell Berry (2022) |
| Bealeton (VA) Liberty | VA | 1 | Wyatt Teller (2013) |
| Bear (DE) Eastern Christian | DE | 1 | Kenny Bigelow Jr. (2013) |
| Beech Grove (IN) Beech Grove | IN | 1 | Josh Fryar (2020) |
| Beggs (OK) Beggs | OK | 1 | Kendal Daniels (2021) |
| Bellaire (TX) Bellaire | TX | 1 | Jayden Peevy (2017) |
| Bellefontaine (OH) Bellefontaine | OH | 1 | Tavien St. Clair (2025) |
| Bellevue (WA) Kennedy Catholic | WA | 1 | Sam Huard (2021) |
| Bellville (TX) Bellville | TX | 1 | DJ Sanders (2025) |
| Belmar (NJ) Wall | NJ | 1 | Joe Shimko (2019) |
| Belmont (NC) South Point | NC | 1 | Sullivan Absher (2023) |
| Bennettsville (SC) Marlboro County | SC | 1 | Lateek Townsend (2011) |
| Benton (LA) Benton | LA | 1 | Malachi Zeigler (2026) |
| Bethesda (MD) Episcopal | MD | 1 | Reed Phillips (2025) |
| Birmingham (AL) Briarwood Christian | AL | 1 | Christopher Vizzina (2023) |
| Birmingham (AL) Homewood | AL | 1 | Jordan Sims (2014) |
| Birmingham (AL) Mountain Brook | AL | 1 | Harold Joiner (2018) |
| Birmingham (AL) Parker | AL | 1 | Jeremiah Beaman (2024) |
| Birmingham (AL) Ramsay | AL | 1 | Jeremiah Williams (2021) |
| Bixby (OK) Bixby | OK | 1 | Reis Vernon (2020) |
| Blountstown (FL) Blountstown | FL | 1 | Jordan Pride (2024) |
| Blythewood (SC) Westwood | SC | 1 | Cam Smith (2019) |
| Boca Raton (FL) Saint Andrew's | FL | 1 | Wesley Winn (2026) |
| Boerne (TX) Champion | TX | 1 | Clayton Hatfield (2014) |
| Bogart (GA) Oconee County | GA | 1 | Jake Johnson (2022) |
| Bolingbrook (IL) Nazareth Academy | IL | 1 | Tyler Morris (2022) |
| Boonville (MO) Boonville | MO | 1 | DJ Wesolak (2022) |
| Boston (MA) Milton Academy | MA | 1 | Kalel Mullings (2020) |
| Bowling Green (KY) Bowling Green | KY | 1 | Vito Tisdale (2020) |
| Bowling Green (KY) Warren East | KY | 1 | Eli Brown (2015) |
| Boyertown (PA) Boyertown Area | PA | 1 | Chris Muller (2012) |
| Bradenton (FL) Manatee | FL | 1 | Mike Blakely (2011) |
| Brenham (TX) Brenham | TX | 1 | Timothy Cole (2012) |
| Brentwood (TN) Brentwood | TN | 1 | Tucker Day (2017) |
| Brockton (MA) Thayer Academy | MA | 1 | Samson Okunlola (2023) |
| Broken Arrow (OK) Broken Arrow | OK | 1 | Myles Slusher (2020) |
| Brooklyn (NY) Abraham Lincoln | NY | 1 | Ishaq Williams (2011) |
| Brownsburg (IN) Brownsburg | IN | 1 | Hunter Johnson (2017) |
| Brownwood (TX) Brownwood | TX | 1 | Jaxon Shipley (2011) |
| Brunswick (GA) Brunswick | GA | 1 | D'Antne Demery (2017) |
| Bryan (TX) Bryan | TX | 1 | Nic Caraway (2022) |
| Buford (GA) Lanier | GA | 1 | Derrick Brown (2016) |
| Bunn (NC) Bunn | NC | 1 | Freeman Jones (2014) |
| Burley (ID) Burley | ID | 1 | Gatlin Bair (2024) |
| Cabot (AR) Cabot | AR | 1 | Sam Dubwig (2024) |
| Calabasas (CA) Calabasas | CA | 1 | Darnay Holmes (2017) |
| Camas (WA) Union | WA | 1 | Tobias Merriweather (2022) |
| Cambridge (WI) Cambridge | WI | 1 | Eli Stein (2022) |
| Camden (AR) Camden Fairview | AR | 1 | Stacey Wilkins (2019) |
| Canonsburg (PA) Canon-McMillan | PA | 1 | Mike Hull (2010) |
| Canton (MI) Plymouth | MI | 1 | Michael Jordan (2016) |
| Cape Coral (FL) Cape Coral | FL | 1 | Jaylen Watkins (2010) |
| Carlsbad (CA) Carlsbad | CA | 1 | Asa Turner (2019) |
| Carroll (IA) Kuemper Catholic School System | IA | 1 | Blaise Gunnerson (2020) |
| Carrollton (TX) Hebron | TX | 1 | Trejan Bridges (2019) |
| Cartersville (GA) Cartersville | GA | 1 | Trevor Lawrence (2018) |
| Carterville (IL) Carterville | IL | 1 | Luke Ford (2018) |
| Cary (NC) Green Hope | NC | 1 | Jordyn Adams (2018) |
| Cedar Park (TX) Cedar Park | TX | 1 | Dominic Espinosa (2010) |
| Cedar Rapids (IA) John F Kennedy | IA | 1 | Christian French (2011) |
| Cedartown (GA) Cedartown | GA | 1 | Nick Chubb (2014) |
| Centerville (TX) Cayuga | TX | 1 | Traylon Shead (2010) |
| Chantilly (VA) Chantilly | VA | 1 | Aiden Gobaira (2022) |
| Charlestown (IN) Charlestown | IN | 1 | Kiyaunta Goodwin (2022) |
| Charlotte (NC) Ardrey Kell | NC | 1 | Corbin Daly (2014) |
| Charlotte (NC) Charlotte Catholic | NC | 1 | Elijah Hood (2014) |
| Charlotte (NC) Charlotte Christian | NC | 1 | Bryce Young (2024) |
| Charlotte (NC) Charlotte Latin School | NC | 1 | Paul Griggs (2012) |
| Charlotte (NC) Harding University High | NC | 1 | Quavaris Crouch (2019) |
| Charlotte (NC) Julius L. Chambers | NC | 1 | Larenz Bryant (2013) |
| Charlotte (NC) Providence | NC | 1 | Bentley Spain (2014) |
| Chatfield (TX) Cedar Hill | TX | 1 | Driphus Jackson (2011) |
| Chatham (VA) Hargrave Military Academy (HS) | VA | 1 | Ego Ferguson (2010) |
| Chesapeake (VA) Indian River | VA | 1 | Devon Hunter (2017) |
| Chesterfield (VA) Lloyd C. Bird | VA | 1 | Jaden Payoute (2019) |
| Chicago (IL) Kenwood Academy | IL | 1 | Marquise Lightfoot (2024) |
| Chicago (IL) Marist | IL | 1 | Nic Weishar (2014) |
| Chicago (IL) Morgan Park | IL | 1 | Nasir Rankin (2026) |
| Chicago (IL) Mount Carmel | IL | 1 | Claude Mpouma (2026) |
| Chicago (IL) St. Ignatius | IL | 1 | Justin Scott (2024) |
| Chicago (IL) St. Rita | IL | 1 | Kaleb Brown (2022) |
| Chico (CA) Pleasant Valley Baptist | CA | 1 | Jordan Rigsbee (2011) |
| China Grove (NC) South Rowan | NC | 1 | Marshall Long (2016) |
| Chula Vista (CA) Eastlake | CA | 1 | Tony Jefferson (2010) |
| Chula Vista (CA) Mater Dei Catholic | CA | 1 | Tre Edwards (2023) |
| Cincinnati (OH) Anderson | OH | 1 | Andrew Norwell (2010) |
| Cincinnati (OH) Archbishop Moeller | OH | 1 | Jake Hausmann (2016) |
| Cincinnati (OH) Elder | OH | 1 | Tommy Kraemer (2016) |
| Cincinnati (OH) LaSalle | OH | 1 | Drue Chrisman (2016) |
| Cincinnati (OH) Wyoming | OH | 1 | Evan Prater (2020) |
| Clairton (PA) Clairton | PA | 1 | Tyler Boyd (2013) |
| Clanton (AL) Chilton County | AL | 1 | Demarcus Riddick (2024) |
| Clayton (NC) Cleveland | NC | 1 | Omarion Hampton (2022) |
| Clayton (OH) Northmont | OH | 1 | Jestin Jacobs (2019) |
| Clearwater (FL) Countryside | FL | 1 | Tyler Moore (2011) |
| Clearwater (FL) Gaither | FL | 1 | Mario Eugenio (2022) |
| Cleveland (OH) Benedictine | OH | 1 | Jerome Baker (2015) |
| Cleveland (OH) Shaker Heights | OH | 1 | Trey McNutt (2025) |
| Cleveland (TN) Cleveland | TN | 1 | Chad Voytik (2012) |
| Clinton (MS) Clinton | MS | 1 | Cam Akers (2017) |
| Clovis (CA) Clovis North | CA | 1 | Jacob Daniel (2015) |
| Coatesville (PA) Coatesville Area | PA | 1 | Terry Wiggins (2026) |
| Cocoa (FL) Cocoa | FL | 1 | Javion Hilson (2025) |
| Coeur D Alene (ID) Coeur d'Alene | ID | 1 | Colson Yankoff (2018) |
| Collinsville (OK) Collinsville | OK | 1 | Levi Draper (2017) |
| Colonia (NJ) Colonia | NJ | 1 | Antonio Alfano (2019) |
| Columbia (SC) Hammond School | SC | 1 | Alex Huntley (2020) |
| Columbia (SC) Spring Valley | SC | 1 | Channing Tindall (2018) |
| Columbus (GA) Hardaway | GA | 1 | Mykel Williams (2022) |
| Columbus (IN) Columbus East | IN | 1 | Gunner Kiel (2012) |
| Columbus (OH) Bishop Watterson | OH | 1 | Davis Seaman (2026) |
| Columbus (OH) Gahanna Lincoln | OH | 1 | Jonathon Cooper (2016) |
| Columbus (OH) Worthington Kilbourne | OH | 1 | Liam McCullough (2015) |
| Compton (CA) Compton Dominguez | CA | 1 | Brandon Beaver (2012) |
| Concord (CA) Clayton Valley | CA | 1 | Kahlil McKenzie (2015) |
| Concord (NC) Cannon School | NC | 1 | Grant Mills (2024) |
| Concord (NC) Concord | NC | 1 | Hamsah Nasirildeen (2017) |
| Concord (NC) Jay M Robinson | NC | 1 | Daevin Hobbs (2023) |
| Concord (NC) Northwest Cabarrus | NC | 1 | Bradley Pinion (2012) |
| Conroe (TX) Conroe | TX | 1 | Dorian Brew (2025) |
| Converse (TX) Judson | TX | 1 | DeMarvin Leal (2019) |
| Conway (SC) Conway | SC | 1 | Bryan Edwards (2016) |
| Corona (CA) Corona | CA | 1 | Demetrius Wright (2010) |
| Corvallis (OR) Crescent Valley | OR | 1 | Talanoa Hufanga (2018) |
| Covina (CA) Charter Oak | CA | 1 | LaVar Arrington Jr. (2025) |
| Covington (GA) Newton | GA | 1 | Jeremiah Holloman (2017) |
| Covington (LA) Covington | LA | 1 | Edgerrin Cooper (2020) |
| Crandall (TX) Crandall | TX | 1 | Samuel Omosigho (2023) |
| Crete (IL) Crete-Monee | IL | 1 | Nyles Morgan (2014) |
| Crockett (TX) Crockett | TX | 1 | Dominique Wheeler (2012) |
| Cross Plains (TN) East Robertson | TN | 1 | Elijah Groves (2024) |
| Cuero (TX) Cuero | TX | 1 | Jordan Whittington (2019) |
| Cypress (TX) Bridgeland | TX | 1 | Ryan Fodje (2025) |
| Cypress (TX) Cy Ranch | TX | 1 | Colten Blanton (2018) |
| Cypress (TX) Cy Springs | TX | 1 | Leon O'Neal Jr. (2018) |
| Daingerfield (TX) Daingerfield | TX | 1 | Steve Edmond (2011) |
| Dallas (GA) North Paulding | GA | 1 | Brock Travelstead (2020) |
| Dallas (GA) Paulding County | GA | 1 | Smael Mondon (2021) |
| Dallas (TX) Highland Park | TX | 1 | Prince Dorbah (2020) |
| Dallas (TX) Parish Episcopal School | TX | 1 | Preston Stone (2021) |
| Dallas (TX) South Oak Cliff | TX | 1 | Kyron Chambers (2022) |
| Dallas (TX) Wilmer-Hutchins | TX | 1 | LaDarrell McNeil (2012) |
| Dalton (GA) Dalton | GA | 1 | Jahmyr Gibbs (2020) |
| Damascus (MD) Damascus | MD | 1 | Bryan Bresee (2020) |
| Danville (KY) Boyle County | KY | 1 | Lamar Dawson (2011) |
| Daphne (AL) Daphne | AL | 1 | T.J. Yeldon (2012) |
| Darien (IL) Hinsdale South | IL | 1 | Josh King (2016) |
| Darlington (SC) Darlington | SC | 1 | Victor Hampton (2010) |
| Davidson (NC) Davidson Day | NC | 1 | Will Grier (2014) |
| Dawson (GA) Terrell County | GA | 1 | Tray Bishop (2017) |
| Dayton (OH) Wayne | OH | 1 | Aamil Wagner (2022) |
| Dearborn (MI) Divine Child | MI | 1 | Aidan Hutchinson (2018) |
| Delaware (OH) Buckeye Valley Local | OH | 1 | Wyatt Pfeifer (2014) |
| Delran (NJ) Delran | NJ | 1 | RJ Moten (2020) |
| Delray Beach (FL) Atlantic | FL | 1 | Keith Bryant (2013) |
| Denver (CO) Mullen | CO | 1 | Cyler Miles (2012) |
| Des Moines (IA) Southeast Polk | IA | 1 | Kadyn Proctor (2023) |
| Destrehan (LA) Destrehan | LA | 1 | Ethan Hutson (2011) |
| Detroit (MI) Belleville | MI | 1 | Myles Rowser (2022) |
| Detroit (MI) East English Village Prep | MI | 1 | Tyrone Sampson Jr. (2018) |
| Detroit (MI) Southfield | MI | 1 | Malik McDowell (2014) |
| D'Iberville (MS) D'Iberville | MS | 1 | Caleb Triplett (2026) |
| Dillon (SC) Dillon | SC | 1 | Josiah Thompson (2024) |
| Donaldsonville (LA) Ascension Catholic | LA | 1 | J'mond Tapp (2022) |
| Downey (CA) St. Pius X-St. Matthias Academy | CA | 1 | Jordan Shaw (2023) |
| Draper (UT) Juan Diego Catholic | UT | 1 | Xavier Carlton (2020) |
| Dripping Springs (TX) Dripping Springs | TX | 1 | Austin Novosad (2023) |
| Dublin (GA) West Laurens | GA | 1 | Johnny O'Neal (2013) |
| Duluth (GA) Peachtree Ridge | GA | 1 | Nigel Warrior (2016) |
| Duncanville (TX) Duncanville | TX | 1 | Jaylen Early (2022) |
| Durango (CO) Durango | CO | 1 | Joshua Bates (2023) |
| Durant (OK) Durant | OK | 1 | Xadavien Sims (2024) |
| Durham (NC) C.E. Jordan | NC | 1 | Vincent Anthony Jr. (2022) |
| Durham (NC) Southern | NC | 1 | Isaiah Campbell (2025) |
| Eastman (GA) Dodge County | GA | 1 | Darrell Johnson (2025) |
| Eden Prairie (MN) Eden Prairie | MN | 1 | Carter Coughlin (2016) |
| Eight Mile (AL) Blount | AL | 1 | Jarrick Williams (2010) |
| El Campo (TX) El Campo | TX | 1 | Rueben Owens (2023) |
| El Cerrito (CA) El Cerrito | CA | 1 | DJ Calhoun (2014) |
| El Dorado (AR) El Dorado | AR | 1 | Bijhon Jackson (2014) |
| El Dorado Hills (CA) Oak Ridge | CA | 1 | Kaleb Edwards (2025) |
| Elba (AL) Elba | AL | 1 | Alvin Henderson (2025) |
| Elberton (GA) Elbert County | GA | 1 | Mecole Hardman (2016) |
| Elizabethtown (KY) John Hardin | KY | 1 | Matt Elam (2014) |
| Elk Grove (CA) Monterey Trail | CA | 1 | Prophet Brown (2021) |
| Elk Grove (CA) Pleasant Grove | CA | 1 | Arik Armstead (2012) |
| Encinitas (CA) La Costa Canyon | CA | 1 | Erik Magnuson (2012) |
| Ennis (TX) Ennis | TX | 1 | James Lockhart (2015) |
| Erie (PA) McDowell | PA | 1 | Cooper Cousins (2024) |
| Eufaula (AL) Eufaula | AL | 1 | Yhonzae Pierre (2023) |
| Eugene (OR) Sheldon | OR | 1 | Curtis White (2010) |
| Eugene (OR) South Eugene | OR | 1 | Gabe King (2010) |
| Euless (TX) Trinity | TX | 1 | Brian Nance (2012) |
| Eureka (MO) Eureka | MO | 1 | Jack Lange (2025) |
| Evanston (IL) Evanston Township | IL | 1 | Sebastian Cheeks (2022) |
| Everett (MA) Everett | MA | 1 | John Montelus (2013) |
| Everett (WA) Mariner | WA | 1 | KeiVarae Russell (2012) |
| Fairfax (VA) Robinson Secondary | VA | 1 | Tristan Leigh (2021) |
| Fairfield (CA) Armijo | CA | 1 | Jericho Johnson (2024) |
| Fairfield (OH) Fairfield | OH | 1 | Jackson Carman (2018) |
| Fairfield (TX) Fairfield | TX | 1 | Charles Oliver (2016) |
| Fayetteville (AR) Fayetteville | AR | 1 | Isaiah Sategna (2022) |
| Findlay (OH) Findlay | OH | 1 | Luke Montgomery (2023) |
| Flint (MI) Southwestern Commencement Academy | MI | 1 | Deron Irving-Bey (2017) |
| Florence (SC) South Florence | SC | 1 | Amare Adams (2025) |
| Flower Mound (TX) Flower Mound | TX | 1 | Nick Evers (2022) |
| Flowood (MS) Hartfield Academy | MS | 1 | Bralan Womack (2025) |
| Fond Du Lac (WI) St. Mary's Springs | WI | 1 | Billy Schrauth (2022) |
| Fontana (CA) Kaiser | CA | 1 | Josh Shirley (2010) |
| Fontana (CA) Summit | CA | 1 | Stephen Carr (2017) |
| Fork Union (VA) Greenwood | VA | 1 | Kelcy Quarles (2010) |
| Fort Lauderdale (FL) Cardinal Gibbons | FL | 1 | Khris Bogle (2019) |
| Fort Lauderdale (FL) Plantation | FL | 1 | Chris Lammons (2014) |
| Fort Lauderdale (FL) Stranahan | FL | 1 | Hykeem Williams (2023) |
| Fort Lauderdale (FL) University School | FL | 1 | Richard Yeargin III (2014) |
| Fort Meade (FL) Fort Meade | FL | 1 | Deonte Anderson (2021) |
| Fort Mill (SC) Indian Land | SC | 1 | Sequel Patterson (2026) |
| Fort Mill (SC) Nation Ford | SC | 1 | Skyler DeLong (2018) |
| Fort Myers (FL) South Fort Myers | FL | 1 | Sammy Watkins (2011) |
| Fort Pierce (FL) John Carroll | FL | 1 | Sean Tatum (2026) |
| Fort Thomas (KY) Highlands | KY | 1 | Austin Collinsworth (2010) |
| Fort Valley (GA) Peach County | GA | 1 | Demarcus Robinson (2013) |
| Fort Wayne (IN) Bishop Luers | IN | 1 | Austin Mack (2016) |
| Fort Wayne (IN) Northrop | IN | 1 | Jerquaden Guilford (2026) |
| Fort Worth (TX) All Saints Episcopal | TX | 1 | Demetrius Knox (2014) |
| Fort Worth (TX) Haltom | TX | 1 | Reggie Wilson (2010) |
| Fort Worth (TX) Nolan Catholic | TX | 1 | NaNa Osafo-Mensah (2019) |
| Fort Worth (TX) North Crowley | TX | 1 | Ka'Morreun Pimpton (2023) |
| Frankfort (KY) Western Hills | KY | 1 | Wan'Dale Robinson (2019) |
| Franklin (MI) Wylie E. Groves | MI | 1 | Jaden Mangham (2022) |
| Franklin (TN) Franklin | TN | 1 | Max Wray (2018) |
| Franklinton (LA) Pine | LA | 1 | Derrick Dillon (2015) |
| Frederick (MD) Johnson | MD | 1 | Nick Forbes (2010) |
| Frederick (MD) Linganore | MD | 1 | Zach Zwinak (2010) |
| Fredericksburg (VA) Stafford | VA | 1 | Josh Ball (2016) |
| Fresno (CA) Clovis West | CA | 1 | Caleb Kelly (2016) |
| Fresno (CA) San Joaquin Memorial | CA | 1 | Jalen McMillan (2020) |
| Frisco (TX) Lone Star | TX | 1 | Davian Groce (2025) |
| Ft Mitchell (KY) Dixie Heights | KY | 1 | Zeke Pike (2012) |
| Fulshear (TX) Katy Jordan | TX | 1 | Andrew Marsh (2025) |
| Gainesville (GA) East Hall | GA | 1 | Sterling Bailey (2011) |
| Gainesville (GA) Gainesville | GA | 1 | Xavier Griffin (2025) |
| Gaithersburg (MD) Quince Orchard | MD | 1 | Chop Robinson (2021) |
| Galena Park (TX) North Shore | TX | 1 | Trey Hopkins (2010) |
| Gallatin (TN) Station Camp | TN | 1 | Josh Malone (2014) |
| Gardner (KS) Gardner Edgerton | KS | 1 | Bubba Starling (2011) |
| Garland (TX) Garland | TX | 1 | Tevin Jackson (2010) |
| Garland (TX) Lakeview Centennial | TX | 1 | Ezra Dotson-Oyetade (2021) |
| Geismar (LA) Dutchtown | LA | 1 | Eric Reid (2010) |
| Geneva (IL) Geneva Community | IL | 1 | Talyn Taylor (2025) |
| Gig Harbor (WA) Gig Harbor | WA | 1 | Austin Seferian-Jenkins (2011) |
| Gilbert (AZ) Highland | AZ | 1 | Caleb Lomu (2023) |
| Gilbert (AZ) Higley | AZ | 1 | Ty Robinson (2019) |
| Glassboro (NJ) Glassboro | NJ | 1 | Juwan Johnson (2015) |
| Glen Ellyn (IL) Glenbard South | IL | 1 | Cam Williams (2024) |
| Glen Ellyn (IL) Glenbard West | IL | 1 | Tommy Schutt (2012) |
| Glen Saint Mary (FL) Baker County Senior | FL | 1 | CeCe Jefferson (2015) |
| Goodland (KS) Goodland | KS | 1 | Linkon Cure (2025) |
| Goodyear (AZ) Millennium | AZ | 1 | Marquis Flowers (2010) |
| Goose Creek (SC) Stratford | SC | 1 | Jacob Park (2014) |
| Gowrie (IA) Southeast Valley | IA | 1 | Aaron Graves (2022) |
| Graham (WA) Graham-Kapowsin | WA | 1 | Foster Sarell (2017) |
| Grand Prairie (TX) South Grand Prairie | TX | 1 | Jeff Okudah (2017) |
| Grand Rapids (MI) East Kentwood | MI | 1 | Logan Brown (2019) |
| Gray (GA) Jones County | GA | 1 | Zion Ragins (2024) |
| Great Falls (MT) Great Falls | MT | 1 | Broden Molen (2025) |
| Green Bay (WI) Bay Port | WI | 1 | Cole Van Lanen (2016) |
| Greenbelt (MD) Eleanor Roosevelt | MD | 1 | Isaiah Prince (2015) |
| Greeneville (TN) Greeneville | TN | 1 | Will Albright (2020) |
| Greensboro (NC) Greene County | NC | 1 | Kevin Wynn (2025) |
| Greensboro (NC) Grimsley | NC | 1 | Jamaal Jarrett (2023) |
| Greensboro (NC) Northern Guilford | NC | 1 | Keenan Allen (2010) |
| Greenville (NC) J.H. Rose | NC | 1 | Kentavius Street (2014) |
| Greenwich (CT) Brunswick School | CT | 1 | Cornelius Johnson (2019) |
| Greenwood (IN) Center Grove | IN | 1 | Caden Curry (2022) |
| Griffin (GA) Griffin | GA | 1 | Corey Moore (2011) |
| Gruver (TX) Gruver | TX | 1 | Jalin Conyers (2020) |
| Hallandale (FL) Hallandale | FL | 1 | Sh'mar Kilby-Lane (2015) |
| Hammond (WI) Saint Croix Central | WI | 1 | Carson Hinzman (2022) |
| Hampton (GA) Dutchtown | GA | 1 | Will Anderson (2020) |
| Harrisburg (NC) Hickory Ridge | NC | 1 | Christian Hamilton (2023) |
| Harrisburg (PA) Harrisburg | PA | 1 | Micah Parsons (2018) |
| Harrisonburg (VA) Harrisonburg | VA | 1 | Landon Turner (2011) |
| Haslet (TX) Eaton | TX | 1 | Hunter Erb (2022) |
| Hattiesburg (MS) Hattiesburg | MS | 1 | Tristen Keys (2026) |
| Hattiesburg (MS) Oak Grove | MS | 1 | Deven Robertson (2026) |
| Hayward (CA) Moreau Catholic | CA | 1 | Johnny Den Bleyker (2016) |
| Hayward (CA) St. Francis | CA | 1 | Tyler Manoa (2018) |
| Hayward (CA) Stellar Prep | CA | 1 | Addison Gumbs (2017) |
| Heathsville (VA) Northumberland | VA | 1 | Cameron Seldon (2023) |
| Heber City (UT) Wasatch | UT | 1 | Skyler Southam (2016) |
| Hebron (KY) Conner | KY | 1 | Drew Barker (2014) |
| Henderson (NV) Liberty | NV | 1 | Moliki Matavao (2021) |
| Hendersonville (TN) Beech | TN | 1 | Jalen Hurd (2014) |
| Hendersonville (TN) Pope John Paul II | TN | 1 | Kenny Minchey (2023) |
| Hialeah (FL) Miami Southridge | FL | 1 | Mark Pope (2018) |
| Highland Home (AL) Highland Home | AL | 1 | Keldric Faulk (2023) |
| Hillsboro (OR) Hillsboro | OR | 1 | Colt Lyerla (2011) |
| Hillsborough (NC) Cedar Ridge | NC | 1 | Robert Crisp (2010) |
| Hillsborough (NC) Orange | NC | 1 | Payton Wilson (2018) |
| Hillside (IL) Hillside | IL | 1 | Darren Ikinnagbon (2025) |
| Hillside (IL) Proviso West | IL | 1 | Kyle Prater (2010) |
| Hollandale (MS) Simmons | MS | 1 | Carlos Thompson (2010) |
| Homestead (FL) Homestead | FL | 1 | Cortez Mills (2025) |
| Homestead (FL) Miami Southridge | FL | 1 | Tyrique Stevenson (2019) |
| Honolulu (HI) Farrington | HI | 1 | V.J. Fehoko (2010) |
| Honolulu (HI) Punahou | HI | 1 | Luke Kaumatule (2012) |
| Hopewell (VA) Hopewell | VA | 1 | TreVeyon Henderson (2021) |
| Houma (LA) Terrebonne | LA | 1 | Maason Smith (2021) |
| Houston (TX) Aldine Eisenhower | TX | 1 | Ryan Niblett (2023) |
| Houston (TX) Alief Taylor | TX | 1 | Brennan Eagles (2018) |
| Houston (TX) Clear Lake | TX | 1 | Julian Humphrey (2022) |
| Houston (TX) Heights | TX | 1 | Jalen Green (2018) |
| Houston (TX) Klein Cain | TX | 1 | Gibson Pyle (2024) |
| Houston (TX) Langham Creek | TX | 1 | Ezekiel Ayangbile (2026) |
| Houston (TX) Second Baptist | TX | 1 | Connor Wood (2010) |
| Houston (TX) St Pius X | TX | 1 | Grant Gunnell (2019) |
| Houston (TX) Strake Jesuit | TX | 1 | John Hebert (2026) |
| Houston (TX) Stratford | TX | 1 | Connor Able (2021) |
| Houston (TX) The Kinkaid School | TX | 1 | Micah Bell (2023) |
| Humble (TX) Kingwood | TX | 1 | Sewo Olonilua (2016) |
| Humble (TX) Summer Creek | TX | 1 | Chad Woodfork (2025) |
| Immokalee (FL) Immokalee | FL | 1 | Mackensie Alexander (2013) |
| Imperial (CA) Imperial | CA | 1 | Royce Freeman (2014) |
| Independence (OR) Central | OR | 1 | Marlon Tuipulotu (2017) |
| Indian Trail (NC) Metrolina Christian Academy | NC | 1 | Bryce McFerson (2022) |
| Indianapolis (IN) Cathedral | IN | 1 | Emil Ekiyor (2018) |
| Indianapolis (IN) North Central | IN | 1 | TJ McWilliams (2023) |
| Iowa City (IA) Iowa City | IA | 1 | AJ Derby (2010) |
| Iowa City (IA) Regina | IA | 1 | Tate Wallace (2026) |
| Iowa City (IA) West Senior | IA | 1 | Oliver Martin (2017) |
| Iowa Colony (TX) Iowa Colony | TX | 1 | Will Terry (2026) |
| Irmo (SC) Dutch Fork | SC | 1 | Julian Walker (2026) |
| Ironton (OH) Ironton | OH | 1 | Reid Carrico (2021) |
| Irvington (NJ) Irvington | NJ | 1 | Adon Shuler (2023) |
| Jackson (MS) Jackson Academy | MS | 1 | TJ White (2026) |
| Jackson (MS) Murrah | MS | 1 | Malik Dear (2015) |
| Jackson (TN) Jackson Christian | TN | 1 | Drae Bowles (2012) |
| Jackson (TN) North Side | TN | 1 | Greg Emerson (2018) |
| Jackson (TN) University School Of Jackson | TN | 1 | Charles Campbell (2018) |
| Jacksonville (FL) Andrew Jackson | FL | 1 | Grayson Howard (2023) |
| Jacksonville (FL) Bishop Kenny | FL | 1 | Ahmad Fulwood (2013) |
| Jacksonville (FL) Duncan U. Fletcher | FL | 1 | David Sharpe (2014) |
| Jacksonville (FL) First Coast | FL | 1 | Daniel McMillian (2013) |
| Jacksonville (FL) Westside | FL | 1 | Jordan Hall (2023) |
| Jacksonville (NC) Northside | NC | 1 | Ja'Qurious Conley (2020) |
| Jefferson (GA) Jefferson | GA | 1 | Sammy Brown (2024) |
| Jennings (LA) Jennings | LA | 1 | Trevor Etienne (2022) |
| Justin (TX) Northwest | TX | 1 | Darrell Simpson (2018) |
| Kahuku (HI) Kahuku | HI | 1 | Enokk Vimahi (2019) |
| Kansas City (MO) Park Hill | MO | 1 | Ondre Pipkins (2012) |
| Kansas City (MO) Rockhurst | MO | 1 | Andrew Sprague (2024) |
| Katy (TX) Seven Lakes | TX | 1 | David Ugwoegbu (2019) |
| Katy (TX) Taylor | TX | 1 | Bryce Foster (2021) |
| Keller (TX) Keller | TX | 1 | Sione Teuhema (2014) |
| Kennedale (TX) Kennedale | TX | 1 | Baron Browning (2017) |
| Kernersville (NC) Glenn | NC | 1 | Jahvaree Ritzie (2021) |
| Kingsland (GA) Camden County | GA | 1 | Micah Morris (2021) |
| Kingston (PA) Wyoming Seminary Upper School | PA | 1 | Justin Denson (2024) |
| Kirkland (WA) Juanita | WA | 1 | Salvon Ahmed (2017) |
| Kissimmee (FL) Osceola | FL | 1 | Diwun Black (2019) |
| Knoxville (TN) Knoxville Catholic | TN | 1 | Cade Mays (2018) |
| Knoxville (TN) Webb School of Knoxville | TN | 1 | Todd Kelly Jr. (2014) |
| La Grange (TX) La Grange | TX | 1 | J.K. Dobbins (2017) |
| La Habra (CA) La Habra | CA | 1 | Toa Lobendahn (2014) |
| La Verne (CA) Bonita | CA | 1 | Noah Mikhail (2025) |
| La Verne (CA) Damien | CA | 1 | Tanner Carew (2014) |
| Lagrange (GA) Troup County | GA | 1 | Kobe Hudson (2020) |
| Lake Charles (LA) Barbe | LA | 1 | Trey Quinn (2014) |
| Lake Charles (LA) Lake Charles College Prep | LA | 1 | TreVonte' Citizen (2022) |
| Lake Oswego (OR) Lake Oswego | OR | 1 | Casey Filkins (2020) |
| Lake Stevens (WA) Lake Stevens | WA | 1 | Jacob Eason (2016) |
| Lakeside (AZ) Blue Ridge | AZ | 1 | Chans Cox (2013) |
| Lakeville (MN) Lakeville North | MN | 1 | Bryce Benhart (2019) |
| Lakeville (MN) Lakeville South | MN | 1 | Riley Mahlman (2021) |
| Lakewood (OH) St. Edward | OH | 1 | Kyle Kalis (2012) |
| Lancaster (CA) Quartz Hill | CA | 1 | Adonyss Currie (2025) |
| Lancaster (CA) Paraclete | CA | 1 | Melquise Stovall (2016) |
| Lancaster (TX) Lancaster | TX | 1 | Omar Manning (2017) |
| Land O Lakes (FL) Land O' Lakes | FL | 1 | Kent Taylor (2012) |
| Lanett (AL) Lanett | AL | 1 | Caden Story (2022) |
| Latta (SC) Latta | SC | 1 | Donell Stanley (2014) |
| Laurel (MS) Laurel | MS | 1 | Charles Cross (2019) |
| Laurel (MS) West Jones | MS | 1 | Byron Young (2019) |
| Laurinburg (NC) Scotland County | NC | 1 | Zamir White (2018) |
| Lawrence (KS) Lawrence Free State | KS | 1 | Turner Corcoran (2020) |
| Lawrenceburg (IN) Lawrenceburg | IN | 1 | Ashton Craig (2022) |
| Lawrenceville (GA) Central Gwinnett | GA | 1 | Jarren Williams (2018) |
| Lawrenceville (GA) Mountain View | GA | 1 | Justin Greene (2024) |
| Lebanon (OR) Lebanon | OR | 1 | Keith Brown (2021) |
| Lebanon (TN) Wilson Central | TN | 1 | Grant Rountree (2023) |
| Leeds (AL) Leeds | AL | 1 | Jonathan Rose (2011) |
| Lees Summit (MO) Lee's Summit | MO | 1 | Drew Lock (2015) |
| Leesburg (VA) Tuscarora | VA | 1 | Fletcher Westphal (2024) |
| Lehi (UT) Skyridge | UT | 1 | Tausili Akana (2023) |
| Lehigh Acres (FL) Lehigh Senior | FL | 1 | Quashon Fuller (2019) |
| Lewis Center (OH) Olentangy Orange | OH | 1 | Zach Harrison (2019) |
| Lexington (KY) Frederick Douglass | KY | 1 | Jager Burton (2021) |
| Lexington (KY) Lafayette | KY | 1 | Landon Young (2016) |
| Liberty (MO) Liberty | MO | 1 | Marcus Lucas (2010) |
| Liberty Hill (TX) Liberty Hill | TX | 1 | Matthew Shipley (2020) |
| Lilburn (GA) Parkview | GA | 1 | Cortez Smith (2025) |
| Lincoln (NE) Lincoln East | NE | 1 | Malachi Coleman (2023) |
| Lincoln (NE) Southwest | NE | 1 | Josh Banderas (2013) |
| Lindenhurst (NY) Lindenhurst | NY | 1 | Jeremy Ruckert (2018) |
| Linwood (NJ) Mainland Reg | NJ | 1 | Jim Cooper Jr. (2013) |
| Lititz (PA) Warwick | PA | 1 | Nolan Rucci (2021) |
| Little Rock (AR) Joe T. Robinson | AR | 1 | Hakim Frampton (2026) |
| Little Rock (AR) Wilbur D. Mills | AR | 1 | Charleston Collins (2024) |
| Little Silver (NJ) Red Bank Reg | NJ | 1 | Garrett Sickels (2013) |
| Livermore (CA) Granada | CA | 1 | George Atkinson III (2011) |
| Logan (IA) Logan-Magnolia | IA | 1 | Grant Brix (2024) |
| Lompoc (CA) Lompoc | CA | 1 | Ainuu Taua (2014) |
| Long Branch (NJ) Long Branch | NJ | 1 | Miles Shuler (2011) |
| Longmont (CO) Longmont | CO | 1 | Miles Bergner (2013) |
| Longview (TX) Longview | TX | 1 | Taylor Tatum (2024) |
| Lopez (PA) Lake-Lehman | PA | 1 | Connor McGovern (2016) |
| Los Angeles (CA) Crenshaw | CA | 1 | De'Anthony Thomas (2011) |
| Los Angeles (CA) Salesian | CA | 1 | Deommodore Lenoir (2017) |
| Los Angeles (CA) Windward School | CA | 1 | Breland Brandt (2016) |
| Louisville (KY) Atherton | KY | 1 | Garyon Hobbs (2026) |
| Louisville (KY) Christian Academy of Louisville | KY | 1 | Ja'Hyde Brown (2026) |
| Lucas (TX) Lovejoy | TX | 1 | Payton Pierce (2024) |
| Lucedale (MS) George County | MS | 1 | Deuce Knight (2025) |
| Ludowici (GA) Faith Baptist Christian Academy | GA | 1 | Chidi Okeke (2015) |
| Lufkin (TX) Lufkin | TX | 1 | Kedren Young (2024) |
| Lynchburg (VA) Liberty Christian | VA | 1 | Gideon Davidson (2025) |
| Macon (MS) Noxubee County | MS | 1 | Jeffery Simmons (2016) |
| Madison (AL) Bob Jones | AL | 1 | Kendall Randolph (2017) |
| Madison (MS) Madison Central | MS | 1 | Tobias Singleton (2011) |
| Madison (WI) Monona Grove | WI | 1 | Jaden Gault (2014) |
| Mandeville (LA) Mandeville | LA | 1 | Joseph Bulovas (2017) |
| Mansfield (TX) Mansfield | TX | 1 | Hassan Ridgeway (2012) |
| Mansfield (TX) Mansfield Lake Ridge | TX | 1 | Felix Ojo (2026) |
| Mansfield (TX) Mansfield Legacy | TX | 1 | Tevin Mitchel (2011) |
| Manteca (CA) Manteca | CA | 1 | Blake Nichelson (2023) |
| Marietta (GA) Kell | GA | 1 | Brayden Rouse (2026) |
| Marietta (GA) Lassiter | GA | 1 | Derrik Allen (2018) |
| Marion (AR) Marion | AR | 1 | Carius Curne (2025) |
| Marrero (LA) John Ehret | LA | 1 | Patrick Jenkins (2020) |
| Mars (PA) Mars Area | PA | 1 | Michael Carmody (2020) |
| Martin (TN) Westview | TN | 1 | Ty Simpson (2022) |
| Massillon (OH) Washington | OH | 1 | Jayden Ballard (2021) |
| Matthews (NC) Weddington | NC | 1 | Aiden Harris (2026) |
| Maumelle (AR) Maumelle | AR | 1 | Andrew Chamblee (2022) |
| McDonough (GA) Eagles Landing Christian | GA | 1 | Zechariah Owens (2023) |
| McDonough (GA) Henry County | GA | 1 | Markeith Ambles (2010) |
| McKinney (TX) McKinney | TX | 1 | Riley Pettijohn (2025) |
| McKinney (TX) McKinney North | TX | 1 | Justin Madubuike (2016) |
| Mchenry (IL) Johnsburg | IL | 1 | C.J. Fiedorowicz (2010) |
| Mckees Rocks (PA) Sto-Rox | PA | 1 | Paul Jones (2010) |
| Mckeesport (PA) McKeesport | PA | 1 | Delvon Simmons (2011) |
| Mcpherson (KS) Mcpherson | KS | 1 | Tyler Matthews (2012) |
| Mead (WA) Mt Spokane | WA | 1 | Ethan Moczulski (2022) |
| Mechanicsville (VA) Atlee | VA | 1 | Ricky DeBerry (2015) |
| Medford (OR) South Medford | OR | 1 | Chase Cota (2018) |
| Medina (OH) Medina | OH | 1 | Drew Allar (2022) |
| Melissa (TX) Melissa | TX | 1 | Nigel Smith II (2024) |
| Memphis (TN) Briarcrest Christian | TN | 1 | Omari Thomas (2020) |
| Memphis (TN) Lausanne Collegiate School | TN | 1 | Eric Gray (2019) |
| Memphis (TN) Memphis Central | TN | 1 | Frank Herron (2013) |
| Memphis (TN) Memphis University School | TN | 1 | Barry Brunetti (2010) |
| Mentor (OH) Mentor | OH | 1 | Brenan Vernon (2023) |
| Meridian (ID) Rocky Mountain | ID | 1 | Jax Tanner (2026) |
| Mesquite (TX) Horn | TX | 1 | Lamont Rogers (2025) |
| Mesquite (TX) North Mesquite | TX | 1 | Cordale Russell (2023) |
| Miami (FL) Belen Jesuit Prep | FL | 1 | Don Chaney Jr. (2020) |
| Miami (FL) Killian | FL | 1 | Jaquan Johnson (2015) |
| Miami (FL) Miami Southridge | FL | 1 | Gerod Holliman (2011) |
| Miami (FL) South Dade | FL | 1 | Frank Ladson (2019) |
| Miamisburg (OH) Miamisburg | OH | 1 | Josh Myers (2017) |
| Midlothian (VA) Clover Hill | VA | 1 | Joel Caleb (2012) |
| Mission (KS) Bishop Miege | KS | 1 | Justin McCay (2010) |
| Mission (KS) Blue Valley North | KS | 1 | Graham Mertz (2019) |
| Missouri City (TX) Fort Bend Marshall | TX | 1 | Malik Hornsby (2020) |
| Mobile (AL) LeFlore | AL | 1 | Danny Woodson (2011) |
| Mobile (AL) Mobile Christian School | AL | 1 | Deontae Lawson (2021) |
| Mobile (AL) Vigor | AL | 1 | Desherrius Flowers (2015) |
| Mocksville (NC) Davie County | NC | 1 | Palmer Williams (2023) |
| Modesto (CA) Central Catholic | CA | 1 | Manasse Itete (2024) |
| Monclova (OH) Anthony Wayne | OH | 1 | Andrew Donnal (2010) |
| Monroe (GA) Monroe Area | GA | 1 | Stephon Tuitt (2011) |
| Monroe (NC) Monroe | NC | 1 | Jordan Young (2025) |
| Monroe (NC) Sun Valley | NC | 1 | Sam Howell (2019) |
| Monroeville (PA) Gateway | PA | 1 | Montae Nicholson (2014) |
| Monrovia (CA) Monrovia | CA | 1 | Ellis McCarthy (2012) |
| Montgomery (AL) Robert E. Lee | AL | 1 | Henry Ruggs III (2017) |
| Montvale (NJ) St Joseph Regional | NJ | 1 | Luke Wypler (2020) |
| Moore (OK) Southmoore | OK | 1 | Cameron Little (2021) |
| Moore (OK) Westmoore | OK | 1 | Brey Walker (2018) |
| Moreno Valley (CA) Rancho Verde | CA | 1 | Ronald Powell (2010) |
| Morton (MS) Morton | MS | 1 | D.D. Bowie (2017) |
| Mount Pleasant (MI) Mt. Pleasant | MI | 1 | Andrew Dennis (2024) |
| Mount Pleasant (SC) Oceanside Collegiate Academy | SC | 1 | Monroe Freeling (2023) |
| Mount Pleasant (SC) Wando | SC | 1 | OrTre Smith (2017) |
| Mount Pleasant (TX) Mount Pleasant | TX | 1 | KD Cannon (2014) |
| Mount Vernon (IA) Mount Vernon | IA | 1 | Tristan Wirfs (2017) |
| Mountlake Terrace (WA) Mountlake Terrace | WA | 1 | Devante Downs (2014) |
| Mukilteo (WA) Kamiak | WA | 1 | T'Andre Waverly (2025) |
| Mukwonago (WI) Mukwonago | WI | 1 | Nathan Roy (2024) |
| Murfreesboro (TN) Riverdale | TN | 1 | Caleb Herring (2023) |
| Murfreesboro (TN) Siegel | TN | 1 | Princeton Uwaifo (2026) |
| Murrieta (CA) Vista Murrieta | CA | 1 | Su'a Cravens (2013) |
| Napa (CA) Napa | CA | 1 | Brock Bowers (2021) |
| Naperville (IL) Naperville North | IL | 1 | David Olano (2023) |
| Naples (FL) First Baptist Academy | FL | 1 | Olsen Patt Henry (2023) |
| Naples (FL) Golden Gate | FL | 1 | Oscar Shadley (2018) |
| Naples (FL) Gulf Coast | FL | 1 | George Takacs (2018) |
| Naples (FL) Palmetto Ridge | FL | 1 | Kamonte Grimes (2021) |
| Nashville (TN) CPA | TN | 1 | Kane Patterson (2019) |
| Nashville (TN) East Nashville Magnet School | TN | 1 | Jacob Phillips (2017) |
| Nashville (TN) Hillsboro | TN | 1 | Kyle Phillips (2015) |
| Nashville (TN) Lipscomb Academy | TN | 1 | Rutger Reitmaier (2017) |
| Nashville (TN) Montgomery Bell Academy | TN | 1 | Ty Chandler (2017) |
| Navarre (FL) Navarre | FL | 1 | Nick Brahms (2017) |
| Navasota (TX) Navasota | TX | 1 | Tren'Davian Dickson (2016) |
| New Castle (DE) Eastern Christian | DE | 1 | Khaliel Rodgers (2013) |
| New Iberia (LA) Westgate | LA | 1 | Josh Boutte (2013) |
| New Lenox (IL) Providence Catholic | IL | 1 | Ryan Ward (2012) |
| New Orleans (LA) Brother Martin | LA | 1 | Bruce Jordan-Swilling (2017) |
| New Orleans (LA) De La Salle | LA | 1 | Caden Jones (2023) |
| New Orleans (LA) Isidore Newman | LA | 1 | Odell Beckham Jr. (2011) |
| New Orleans (LA) John Curtis | LA | 1 | Kenny Young (2014) |
| New Orleans (LA) Riverdale | LA | 1 | Donte Jackson (2015) |
| New Orleans (LA) Warren Easton | LA | 1 | Malachi Preciado (2022) |
| New Palestine (IN) New Palestine | IN | 1 | Ian Moore (2024) |
| Newberry (FL) Newberry | FL | 1 | Ja'len Parks (2017) |
| Newbury Park (CA) Newbury Park | CA | 1 | Zach Okun (2015) |
| Newnan (GA) Newnan | GA | 1 | Tray Matthews (2013) |
| Newport Beach (CA) Corona Del Mar | CA | 1 | John Humphreys (2020) |
| Newport Beach (CA) Newport Harbor | CA | 1 | Cecil Whiteside (2010) |
| Norfolk (VA) Lake Taylor | VA | 1 | Jalyn Holmes (2014) |
| Norfolk (VA) Norfolk Christian | VA | 1 | Kwontie Moore (2012) |
| Norman (OK) Community Christian School | OK | 1 | Bai Jobe (2023) |
| North Charleston (SC) Fort Dorchester | SC | 1 | John Simpson (2016) |
| North Little Rock (AR) North Little Rock | AR | 1 | K.J. Hill (2015) |
| North Palm Beach (FL) The Benjamin School | FL | 1 | Chauncey Bowens (2024) |
| North Richland Hills (TX) Richland | TX | 1 | DaShaun White (2018) |
| North Ridgeville (OH) North Ridgeville | OH | 1 | Demario McCall (2016) |
| Oak Ridge (TN) Oak Ridge | TN | 1 | Malik Howard (2026) |
| Oakboro (NC) West Stanly | NC | 1 | Jordan Poole (2021) |
| Oakdale (CT) St. Thomas More | CT | 1 | Marvin Nguetsop (2026) |
| Oakley (CA) Freedom | CA | 1 | Joe Mixon (2014) |
| Odebolt (IA) Odebolt-Arthur | IA | 1 | Jaxx DeJean (2026) |
| Oklahoma City (OK) Carl Albert | OK | 1 | Trystan Haynes (2025) |
| Oklahoma City (OK) Heritage Hall | OK | 1 | Barry J. Sanders (2012) |
| Oklahoma City (OK) John Marshall | OK | 1 | Tramonda Moore (2016) |
| Oklahoma City (OK) Putnam City | OK | 1 | Ron Tatum (2018) |
| Olathe (KS) Olathe East | KS | 1 | Brett Carroll (2024) |
| Olympia (WA) Tumwater | WA | 1 | Ryan Otton (2022) |
| Omaha (NE) Burke | NE | 1 | Devon Jackson (2022) |
| Omaha (NE) Omaha Central | NE | 1 | Tory Pittman III (2026) |
| Omaha (NE) Westside | NE | 1 | Christian Jones (2025) |
| Ooltewah (TN) Ooltewah | TN | 1 | Jacques Smith (2010) |
| Opa Locka (FL) Chaminade-Madonna Prep | FL | 1 | Jeremiah Smith (2024) |
| Opa Locka (FL) Miami Carol City | FL | 1 | Nick Lennear (2026) |
| Opelika (AL) Opelika | AL | 1 | Malik Autry (2025) |
| Orange City (FL) University | FL | 1 | Lorenzo Lingard (2018) |
| Orange Park (FL) Fleming Island | FL | 1 | Samuel Singleton (2023) |
| Orange Park (FL) Oakleaf | FL | 1 | Shaquille Quarterman (2016) |
| Orangeburg (SC) Orangeburg-Wilkinson | SC | 1 | Albert Huggins (2015) |
| Orlando (FL) Evans | FL | 1 | Tony Stevens (2013) |
| Orlando (FL) Jones | FL | 1 | Malik Bryant (2023) |
| Orlando (FL) Lake Nona | FL | 1 | Charles Woodson Jr. (2026) |
| Orlando (FL) Olympia | FL | 1 | Kamran James (2023) |
| Overland Park (KS) Blue Valley Northwest | KS | 1 | Andrew Babalola (1) |
| Oviedo (FL) Hagerty | FL | 1 | Jacob Zuhr (2020) |
| Owings Mills (MD) Owings Mills | MD | 1 | Donovan Smith (2011) |
| Oxford (MS) Oxford | MS | 1 | DK Metcalf (2016) |
| Paintsville (KY) Paintsville | KY | 1 | Kash Daniel (2016) |
| Palatine (IL) Fremd | IL | 1 | Brian Bobek (2011) |
| Palatine (IL) Palatine | IL | 1 | Christian Lombard (2010) |
| Palestine (TX) Palestine | TX | 1 | S'Vioarean Martin (2026) |
| Palm Bay (FL) Champagnat Catholic - Hialeah | FL | 1 | Travonte Valentine (2014) |
| Palmdale (CA) Highland | CA | 1 | Christian Thomas (2010) |
| Panama City (FL) Bay | FL | 1 | Janarius Robinson (2016) |
| Paramus (NJ) Paramus Catholic | NJ | 1 | Malachi Goodman (2025) |
| Park Ridge (IL) Maine South | IL | 1 | Peter Skoronski (2020) |
| Parker (CO) Chaparral | CO | 1 | Shane Callahan (2012) |
| Parker (CO) Ponderosa | CO | 1 | Issac Power (2018) |
| Pasadena (CA) John Muir | CA | 1 | Kevon Seymour (2012) |
| Pascagoula (MS) Pascagoula | MS | 1 | Jeffery Rush (2024) |
| Paterson (NJ) Paterson Catholic | NJ | 1 | Shakim Phillips (2010) |
| Patterson (LA) Patterson | LA | 1 | Kenny Hilliard (2011) |
| Peculiar (MO) Raymore-Peculiar | MO | 1 | Jaden Reddell (2024) |
| Pendleton (SC) Pendleton | SC | 1 | Michael Hill (2013) |
| Pennsauken (NJ) Timber Creek | NJ | 1 | Greg Webb (2013) |
| Pensacola (FL) Pine Forest | FL | 1 | Trenton Henderson (2026) |
| Petersburg (VA) Petersburg | VA | 1 | Quinton Spain (2010) |
| Pflugerville (TX) Weiss | TX | 1 | JJ Mays (2026) |
| Philadelphia (MS) Philadelphia | MS | 1 | C.J. Johnson (2011) |
| Philadelphia (PA) George Washington | PA | 1 | Sharrif Floyd (2010) |
| Philadelphia (PA) Northeast | PA | 1 | Elijah Jeudy (2021) |
| Phoenix (AZ) Desert Vista | AZ | 1 | Connor Culp (2016) |
| Phoenix (AZ) North Canyon | AZ | 1 | Austin Jackson (2017) |
| Phoenix (AZ) St. Mary's | AZ | 1 | Odua Isibor (2017) |
| Pierre (SD) T.F. Riggs | SD | 1 | Lincoln Kienholz (2023) |
| Pike Ntl Forest (CO) The Classical Academy | CO | 1 | Daniel Carlson (2013) |
| Pike Road (AL) Pike Road | AL | 1 | Khurtiss Perry (2022) |
| Pine Bluff (AR) Pine Bluff | AR | 1 | Courtney Crutchfield (2024) |
| Pittsburg (CA) Pittsburg | CA | 1 | Jadyn Hudson (2025) |
| Pittsburgh (PA) Penn Hills | PA | 1 | Cullen Christian (2010) |
| Plainfield (IL) Plainfield South | IL | 1 | Clifton Garrett (2014) |
| Plano (TX) Plano East | TX | 1 | Tyler Owens (2019) |
| Plano (TX) Plano West | TX | 1 | Jackson Jeffcoat (2010) |
| Plano (TX) Prestonwood Christian | TX | 1 | Austin Stogner (2019) |
| Plaquemine (LA) Plaquemine | LA | 1 | Davon Godchaux (2014) |
| Playa Del Rey (CA) St. Bernard | CA | 1 | Isaiah Johnson (2021) |
| Pleasanton (CA) Foothill | CA | 1 | Isaiah Langley (2015) |
| Pompano Beach (FL) Monarch | FL | 1 | Jabari Brady (2025) |
| Ponte Vedra Beach (FL) Nease | FL | 1 | Evan Crenshaw (2022) |
| Portland (OR) Douglas | OR | 1 | Owamagbe Odighizuwa (2010) |
| Portland (OR) Jefferson | OR | 1 | Trejon Williams (2022) |
| Portland (OR) Westview | OR | 1 | Darrius Clemons (2022) |
| Powder Springs (GA) Hillgrove | GA | 1 | Myles Murphy (2020) |
| Powell (TN) Powell | TN | 1 | Adarius Redmond (2023) |
| Princeton (NC) Princeton | NC | 1 | Johnny Frasier (2015) |
| Prosper (TX) Prosper | TX | 1 | Bryce Gilmore (2026) |
| Provo (UT) Provo | UT | 1 | Ty Jones (2017) |
| Provo (UT) Timpview | UT | 1 | Spencer Fano (2023) |
| Purvis (MS) Purvis | MS | 1 | Markell Pack (2014) |
| Quitman (GA) Brooks County | GA | 1 | Malkom Parrish (2014) |
| Raleigh (NC) Sanderson | NC | 1 | Alim McNeill (2018) |
| Raleigh (NC) Wakefield | NC | 1 | Niklas Sade (2011) |
| Rancho Cucamonga (CA) Rancho Cucamonga | CA | 1 | C.J. Stroud (2020) |
| Randolph (NJ) Randolph | NJ | 1 | Brendan Mahon (2013) |
| Reading (PA) Governor Mifflin | PA | 1 | Nick Singleton (2022) |
| Reading (PA) Wyomissing | PA | 1 | J'ven Williams (2023) |
| Red Bank (NJ) Red Bank Catholic | NJ | 1 | Quenton Nelson (2014) |
| Redlands (CA) Redlands East Valley | CA | 1 | Jaelan Phillips (2017) |
| Reno (NV) Bishop Manogue | NV | 1 | Cian Stack (2025) |
| Reno (NV) Reno | NV | 1 | Ale Kaho (2018) |
| Reserve (LA) East St. John | LA | 1 | Xavier Lewis (2015) |
| Riceboro (GA) Liberty County | GA | 1 | Richard LeCounte III (2017) |
| Richardson (TX) Richardson | TX | 1 | Jaimeon Winfield (2026) |
| Richburg (SC) Lewisville | SC | 1 | Josh Belk (2018) |
| Richmond (TX) Fort Bend Travis | TX | 1 | Nick Harvey (2014) |
| Richmond (TX) Foster | TX | 1 | Cody Jackson (2021) |
| Richmond (VA) St. Christopher's | VA | 1 | Darius Gray (2025) |
| Riverside (CA) Polytechnic | CA | 1 | Ykili Ross (2015) |
| Rochelle (GA) Wilcox County | GA | 1 | Desmond Tisdol (2020) |
| Rochester (NY) Aquinas Institute | NY | 1 | Jarron Jones (2012) |
| Rock Island (IL) Alleman | IL | 1 | Charles Jagusah (2023) |
| Rockwall (TX) Rockwall-Heath | TX | 1 | Trevor Elbert (2015) |
| Roebuck (SC) Dorman | SC | 1 | Charone Peake (2011) |
| Rome (GA) Darlington School | GA | 1 | Tate Ratledge (2020) |
| Rome (GA) Rome | GA | 1 | Adam Anderson (2018) |
| Roswell (GA) Blessed Trinity Catholic | GA | 1 | Steele Chambers (2019) |
| Roswell (GA) Fellowship Christian | GA | 1 | Josh Petty (2025) |
| Roswell (GA) Roswell | GA | 1 | Ty'Ron Hopper (2019) |
| Round Rock (TX) Cedar Ridge | TX | 1 | Jaylen Ellis (2019) |
| Russellville (AL) Russellville | AL | 1 | Brent Calloway (2011) |
| Ruston (LA) Ruston | LA | 1 | Ahmad Hudson (2026) |
| Sachse (TX) Sachse | TX | 1 | Kaliq Lockett (2025) |
| Sacramento (CA) Capital Christian | CA | 1 | Nifae Lealao (2014) |
| Saginaw (MI) Saginaw | MI | 1 | DeAnthony Arnett (2011) |
| Saint Augustine (FL) Pedro Menendez | FL | 1 | Tony Steward (2011) |
| Saint Clairsville (OH) St. Clairsville | OH | 1 | Brendan Ferns (2016) |
| Saint George (UT) Desert HIlls | UT | 1 | Penei Sewell (2018) |
| Saint Louis (MO) John Burroughs School | MO | 1 | Tyson Ford (2022) |
| Saint Louis (MO) Parkway North | MO | 1 | Michael Thompson (2018) |
| Saint Louis (MO) St. Mary's | MO | 1 | Kevin Coleman (2022) |
| Saint Paul (MN) Cretin Derham Hall | MN | 1 | Seantrel Henderson (2010) |
| Saint Paul (MN) Irondale | MN | 1 | Jimmy Gjere (2010) |
| Saint Petersburg (FL) Lakewood | FL | 1 | Isaiah Wynn (2014) |
| Sainte-Anne-de-Bellevue (QC) John Abbott College | QC | 1 | JJ Molson (2016) |
| Salem (UT) Salem Hills | UT | 1 | Porter Gustin (2015) |
| Salt Lake City (UT) Murray | UT | 1 | Dillon Curtis (2025) |
| Salt Lake City (UT) Olympus | UT | 1 | Adam Bywater (2026) |
| San Antonio (TX) Alamo Heights | TX | 1 | Michael Terry III (2025) |
| San Antonio (TX) Antonian College Prep | TX | 1 | Devin Grant (2020) |
| San Antonio (TX) Claudia Taylor Johnson | TX | 1 | Karsten Battles (2018) |
| San Antonio (TX) Reagan | TX | 1 | Derek Kerstetter (2017) |
| San Antonio (TX) Roosevelt | TX | 1 | Kaeden Scott (2026) |
| San Antonio (TX) Veterans Memorial | TX | 1 | James Peoples (2024) |
| San Antonio (TX) Warren | TX | 1 | Trey Lealaimatafao (2014) |
| San Diego (CA) Helix | CA | 1 | Isaac Taylor-Stuart (2018) |
| San Diego (CA) Lincoln | CA | 1 | Jalil Tucker (2022) |
| San Diego (CA) Madison | CA | 1 | Sampson Niu (2017) |
| San Diego (CA) Mission Bay | CA | 1 | Dillon Baxter (2010) |
| San Diego (CA) Mount Miguel | CA | 1 | Brandon Arrington (2026) |
| San Diego (CA) Westview | CA | 1 | Taylor McNamara (2012) |
| San Jose (CA) Valley Christian | CA | 1 | Byron Marshall (2012) |
| San Juan Capistrano (CA) J Serra Catholic | CA | 1 | Luke Wattenberg (2016) |
| San Juan Capistrano (CA) San Juan Hills | CA | 1 | Sean Rhyan (2019) |
| San Marcos (CA) Mission Hills | CA | 1 | DeChaun Holiday (2015) |
| Santa Rosa Beach (FL) South Walton | FL | 1 | Pearce Spurlin (2023) |
| Savannah (GA) Benedictine Military School | GA | 1 | Luke Kromenhoek (2024) |
| Savannah (GA) Savannah Christian Prep | GA | 1 | Demetris Robertson (2016) |
| Scottsdale (AZ) Notre Dame Preparatory | AZ | 1 | Cooper Perry (2025) |
| Schertz (TX) Clemens | TX | 1 | James Henry (2006) |
| Sebastian (FL) Sebastian River | FL | 1 | Jarez Parks (2017) |
| Seffner (FL) Armwood | FL | 1 | Clyde Pinder Jr. (2020) |
| Selma (AL) Southside | AL | 1 | Derick Smith (2025) |
| Severn (MD) Archbishop Spalding | MD | 1 | Malik Washington (2025) |
| Shawnee (OK) Shawnee | OK | 1 | Creed Humphrey (2017) |
| Shelby (NC) Shelby | NC | 1 | Dax Hollifield (2018) |
| Sherman Oaks (CA) Notre Dame | CA | 1 | McKel Broussard (2019) |
| Shiner (TX) Shiner | TX | 1 | Dalton Brooks (2023) |
| Shreveport (LA) Captain Shreve | LA | 1 | Kendrick Law (2022) |
| Shreveport (LA) Woodlawn | LA | 1 | Shiro Davis (2012) |
| Silsbee (TX) Silsbee | TX | 1 | Drelon Miller (2024) |
| Sioux Falls (SD) Washington | SD | 1 | Matt Farniok (2016) |
| Smyrna (TN) Smyrna | TN | 1 | Arion Carter (2023) |
| Snellville (GA) South Gwinnett | GA | 1 | Justin Mascoll (2018) |
| Solon (IA) Solon | IA | 1 | Tyler Linderbaum (2018) |
| Spanaway (WA) Bethel | WA | 1 | Zaydrius Rainey-Sale (2025) |
| Spanaway (WA) Spanaway Lake | WA | 1 | Jasiah Wagoner (2023) |
| Spartanburg (SC) Spartanburg | SC | 1 | Tavien Feaster (2016) |
| Splendora (TX) Splendora | TX | 1 | Jay Bradford (2015) |
| Spokane (WA) East Valley | WA | 1 | Rodrick Fisher (2018) |
| Spring (TX) Klein Oak | TX | 1 | Dwight McGlothern (2020) |
| Spring Hill (TN) Summit | TN | 1 | Keaten Wade (2022) |
| Springdale (AR) Har-Ber | AR | 1 | Joshua Frazier (2014) |
| Springfield (MO) Hillcrest | MO | 1 | Dorial Green-Beckham (2012) |
| St. Catharines (ON) Canada Prep Football Academy | ON | 1 | Neville Gallimore (2015) |
| St. Charles (IL) St. Charles North | IL | 1 | Lucas Tenbrock (2026) |
| Stafford (VA) North Stafford | VA | 1 | Nana Asiedu (2018) |
| Stamford (CT) King & Low Heywood Thomas | CT | 1 | Silas Redd (2010) |
| Stamford (CT) Stamford | CT | 1 | Khairi Fortt (2010) |
| Starkville (MS) Starkville | MS | 1 | Willie Gay Jr. (2017) |
| Steamboat Springs (CO) Steamboat Springs | CO | 1 | Austin Hinder (2010) |
| Steilacoom (WA) Steilacoom | WA | 1 | Emeka Egbuka (2021) |
| Sterling (VA) Dominion | VA | 1 | Chad Smith (2015) |
| Stone Mountain (GA) Stone Mountain | GA | 1 | Ukeme Eligwe (2012) |
| Stoughton (WI) Stoughton | WI | 1 | Jack Nelson (2020) |
| Streetsboro (OH) Streetsboro | OH | 1 | Michael Hall Jr. (2021) |
| Sugar Land (TX) Fort Bend Christian Academy | TX | 1 | Bennett Warren (2024) |
| Sunbury (OH) Big Walnut | OH | 1 | Garrett Stover (2024) |
| Suwanee (GA) Collins Hill | GA | 1 | Sam Horn (2022) |
| Suwanee (GA) Lambert | GA | 1 | Kojo Antwi (2022) |
| Swainsboro (GA) Swainsboro | GA | 1 | Demello Jones (2024) |
| Tacoma (WA) Lincoln | WA | 1 | Julien Simon (2021) |
| Tallahassee (FL) John Paul II Catholic | FL | 1 | Terrion Arnold (2021) |
| Tallahassee (FL) North Florida Christian | FL | 1 | Travis Blanks (2012) |
| Tallahassee (FL) Robert F Munroe Day School | FL | 1 | Makari Vickers (2023) |
| Tampa (FL) Berkeley Prep | FL | 1 | Keon Keeley (2023) |
| Tampa (FL) Hillsborough | FL | 1 | Jordan Sherit (2013) |
| Tampa (FL) Jefferson | FL | 1 | Tyriq McCord (2012) |
| Tampa (FL) Tampa Bay Tech | FL | 1 | Deon Cain (2015) |
| Tarpon Springs (FL) Tarpon Springs | FL | 1 | Zach DeBell (2011) |
| Temecula (CA) Chaparral | CA | 1 | Justin Dedich (2018) |
| Tempe (AZ) Corona Del Sol | AZ | 1 | Todd Peat (2011) |
| Temple (TX) Lake Belton | TX | 1 | Selman Bridges (2024) |
| Texarkana (TX) Liberty-Eylau | TX | 1 | Davion Hall (2014) |
| The Woodlands (TX) The Woodlands | TX | 1 | Ben Pruitt (2011) |
| Thomas (OK) Thomas-Fay-Custer | OK | 1 | Aden Kelley (2021) |
| Thomaston (GA) Upson-Lee | GA | 1 | Travon Walker (2019) |
| Thomasville (GA) Thomas County Central | GA | 1 | Ray Drew (2011) |
| Thomson (GA) Thomson | GA | 1 | Christian Tutt (2018) |
| Thousand Oaks (CA) Westlake | CA | 1 | Kevin Robledo (2015) |
| Tiger (GA) Rabun County | GA | 1 | Gunner Stockton (2022) |
| Toccoa (GA) Stephens County | GA | 1 | Ben Cleveland (2016) |
| Toledo (OH) St. John's Jesuit | OH | 1 | Dallas Gant (2018) |
| Tomball (TX) Tomball | TX | 1 | Demond Demas (2020) |
| Toms River (NJ) Toms River North | NJ | 1 | Jaelyne Matthews (2025) |
| Torrance (CA) North High School | CA | 1 | Mique Juarez (2016) |
| Towson (MD) Calvert Hall College | MD | 1 | Lawrence Cager (2015) |
| Traverse City (MI) Central | MI | 1 | Josh Burnham (2022) |
| Trussville (AL) Hewitt-Trussville | AL | 1 | Malachi Moore (2020) |
| Tulsa (OK) Holland Hall | OK | 1 | Alex Felkins (2019) |
| Tulsa (OK) Memorial | OK | 1 | Isaiah Thomas (2017) |
| Tuscaloosa (AL) Hillcrest | AL | 1 | Jay Bramblett (2019) |
| Tustin (CA) Tustin | CA | 1 | Taven Epps (2026) |
| Union (NJ) Union | NJ | 1 | Davison Igbinosun (2022) |
| Uniontown (PA) Laurel Highlands | PA | 1 | Rodney Gallagher (2023) |
| Upland (CA) Upland | CA | 1 | Justin Flowe (2020) |
| Urbandale (IA) Urbandale | IA | 1 | Allen Lazard (2014) |
| Van Alstyne (TX) Van Alstyne | TX | 1 | Connor Mayes (2014) |
| Versailles (KY) Woodford County | KY | 1 | Drake Jackson (2016) |
| Vidalia (GA) Vidalia Comprehensive | GA | 1 | Nate McBride (2017) |
| Virginia Beach (VA) Bayside | VA | 1 | Taquan Mizzell (2013) |
| Virginia Beach (VA) Catholic | VA | 1 | Jamil Kamara (2014) |
| Virginia Beach (VA) Frank W. Cox | VA | 1 | Jordan Williams (2017) |
| Vista (CA) Vista | CA | 1 | Stefan McClure (2011) |
| Voorhees (NJ) Eastern | NJ | 1 | Eli Apple (2013) |
| Waco (TX) Connally | TX | 1 | Jelani McDonald (2023) |
| Waco (TX) La Vega | TX | 1 | Michael Starts (2012) |
| Waco (TX) Midway | TX | 1 | Ahmad Dixon (2010) |
| Wake Forest (NC) Heritage | NC | 1 | Ricky Person Jr. (2018) |
| Wake Forest (NC) Wake Forest | NC | 1 | Dexter Lawrence (2016) |
| Waldorf (MD) North Point | MD | 1 | Rasheed Walker (2018) |
| Wales (WI) Kettle Moraine | WI | 1 | Trey Wedig (2020) |
| Walker (LA) Walker | LA | 1 | Brian Thomas Jr. (2021) |
| Wallingford (CT) Choate Rosemary Hall | CT | 1 | Will Powers (2019) |
| Warwick (RI) Bishop Hendricken | RI | 1 | Xavier Truss (2019) |
| Wayne (NJ) DePaul Catholic | NJ | 1 | Ronnie Hickman (2019) |
| Weatherford (OK) Weatherford | OK | 1 | CJ Nickson (2025) |
| Wentzville (MO) Timberland | MO | 1 | Nick Demien (2010) |
| West Bloomfield (MI) West Bloomfield | MI | 1 | Lance Dixon (2019) |
| West Hills (CA) Chaminade | CA | 1 | Ryon Sayeri (2024) |
| West Lafayette (IN) West Lafayette | IN | 1 | George Karlaftis (2019) |
| West Palm Beach (FL) Cardinal Newman | FL | 1 | Matt Burke (2013) |
| West Palm Beach (FL) Wellington | FL | 1 | Ahmmon Richards (2016) |
| Westerville (OH) Westerville South | OH | 1 | Jaelen Gill (2018) |
| Westlake Village (CA) Westlake | CA | 1 | De'Gabriel Floyd (2019) |
| Wexford (PA) North Allegheny | PA | 1 | Josh Lugg (2017) |
| Wheaton (IL) Wheaton Warrenville South | IL | 1 | Jack Olsen (2020) |
| Whitehouse (TX) Whitehouse | TX | 1 | Trey Metoyer (2011) |
| Wichita (KS) East | KS | 1 | Xavier Kelly (2016) |
| Wichita (KS) Northwest | KS | 1 | Breece Hall (2019) |
| Williamsburg (IA) Williamsburg | IA | 1 | Derek Weisskopf (2024) |
| Wilsonville (OR) Wilsonville | OR | 1 | Draco Bynum (2018) |
| Winter Garden (FL) West Orange | FL | 1 | Ivan Taylor (2025) |
| Winter Park (FL) Winter Park | FL | 1 | Asiantii Woulard (2013) |
| Wisconsin Rapids (WI) Lincoln | WI | 1 | Vince Biegel (2012) |
| Woodland Hills (CA) Taft | CA | 1 | D.J. Morgan (2010) |
| Wyandotte (MI) Martin Luther King | MI | 1 | Donnie Corley (2016) |
| Yelm (WA) Yelm | WA | 1 | Brayden Platt (2024) |
| Yulee (FL) Yulee | FL | 1 | Derrick Henry (2013) |

== See also ==
- High School Football National Championship
