= Altoona, Iowa =

City in Polk County, Iowa, United States

- City
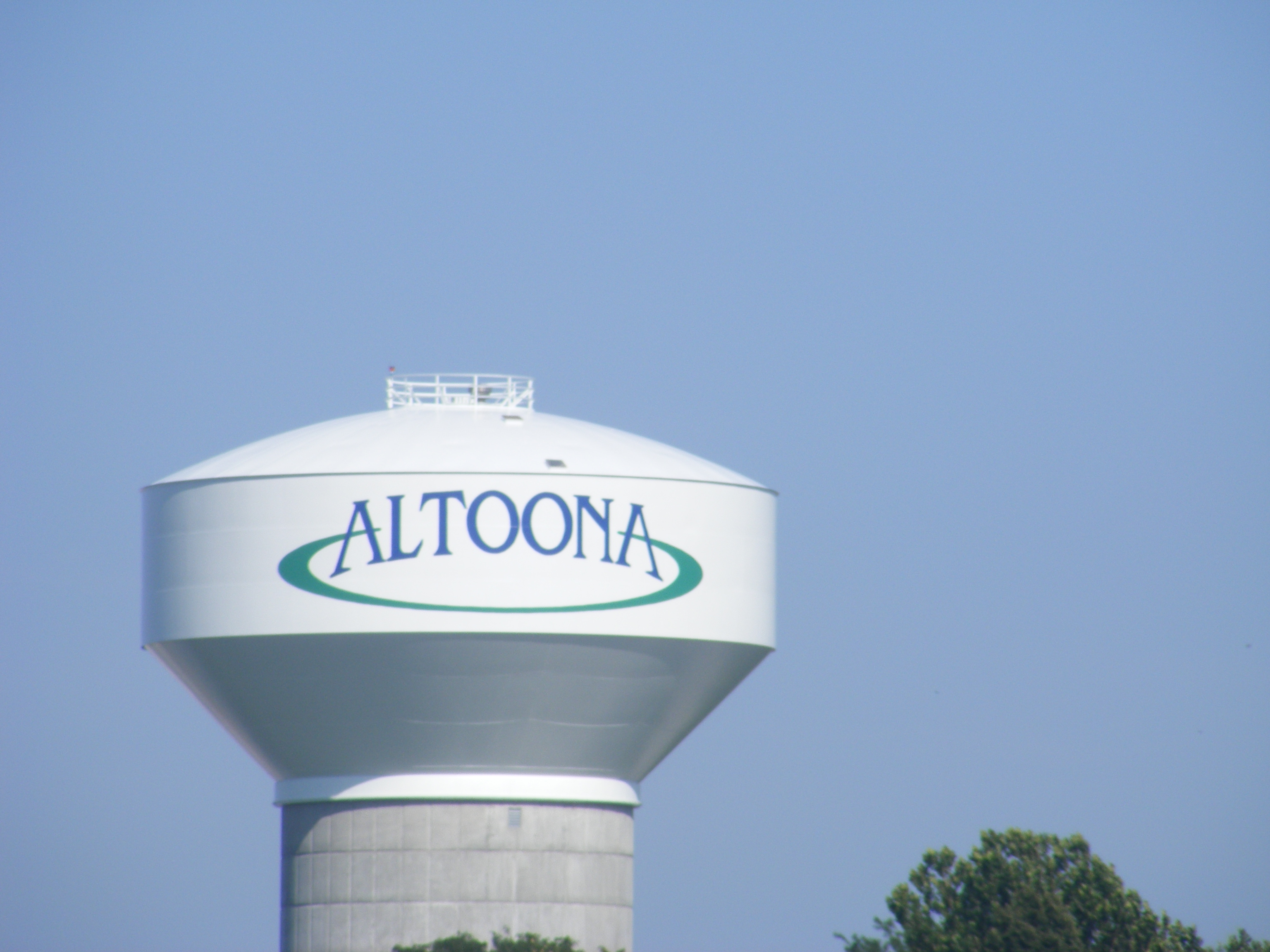
- Altoona water tower

- Logo
- Interactive map of Altoona, Iowa
- Coordinates: 41°39′0″N 93°28′21″W
- Country: United States
- State: Iowa
- County: Polk
- Townships: Clay, Delaware, Douglas
- Founded: 1868
- Incorporated: March 11, 1876

Area
  - Total: 11.69 sq mi (30.28 km^{2})
  - Land: 11.68 sq mi (30.25 km^{2})
  - Water: 0.012 sq mi (0.03 km^{2})
- Elevation: 958 ft (292 m)

Population (2020)
  - Total: 19,565
  - Rank: 26th in Iowa
  - Density: 1,675.1/sq mi (646.76/km^{2})
- Time zone: UTC-6 (Central (CST))
  - Summer (DST): UTC-5 (CDT)
- ZIP code: 50009
- Area code: 515
- FIPS code: 19-01630
- GNIS ID: 2393939
- Website: altoona-iowa.com

Altoona is a city in Polk County, Iowa, United States, and part of the Des Moines metropolitan area. The population was 19,565 at the 2020 census. It is home to the Adventureland amusement park and Prairie Meadows horse racing track and casino.

== History ==
Anthony Yant first settled in what is now Altoona in 1854, the same year Gilbert T. Taylor settled there. The land was originally surveyed in 1847 and put up for sale by the US government in 1848, but it took six years to sell. After many sales between different families, the Davis family ended up with the land on February 1, 1868.

The Davises hired surveyor Julian B. Bausman to lay out the city. He is also credited for giving the city the current name. Altoona is named for the Latin word for "high," altus, after surveyor Julian B. Bausman discovered Altoona was the highest point on the Des Moines Valley Railroad between Des Moines and Keokuk.

The plot was recorded on July 30, 1868, and the Post office opened the next day. When the Rock Island Railroad came to Altoona in September of that year, they referred to Altoona as Yant, the city's original name.

Altoona was incorporated as a city on March 11, 1876.

In addition to serving as Altoona's first mayor, Francis English was the town doctor. After the great train crash of 1877, English rushed to the scene.

Altoona's second mayor was Thomas Haines, who operated the T.E. Haines tile and brick company. Haines donated land to the city of Altoona to be used as a park, now known as Haines Park.

The only other mayor of Altoona to have a park dedicated to him is Sam Wise, noted for paving the streets of Altoona, and building a sewer system that was advanced for its time and allowed for future expansion. His dedication to Altoona's parks led to the city's sports complex being named the "Sam Wise Youth Complex."

By the turn of the 20th century, Altoona could almost be classified as a coal camp. United Mine Workers of America Local 407 was organized in Altoona in 1897, and by 1902, it had 61 members. This was close to 20 percent of the town's population at the time.

In 1998, the Altoona Public Library opened at its new location at 700 8th Street SW.

On May 5, 2003, the Altoona City Council recognized the Altoona Area Historical Society as the city's official organization to collect, secure, and preserve the artifacts and records of the city of Altoona and surrounding areas. In 2011 the Altoona Area Historical Society started major renovation work on the interior of Altoona's oldest building. The building is now a museum.

In 2013, construction began for a new Facebook data center. Facebook asked local company RPM Access to build and operate a wind farm that will put more energy into the system than the data center will consume.

In February 2016, the Cinemark Altoona theater was opened.

In October 2017, the Outlets of Des Moines were opened.

== Geography ==
According to the United States Census Bureau, the city has an area of 9.35 square miles (24.22 km^{2}), all land.

== Demographics ==
Historical population
Census	Pop.	Note	%±
1880	400		—
1890	326		−18.5%
1900	328		0.6%
1910	438		33.5%
1920	502		14.6%
1930	514		2.4%
1940	640		24.5%
1950	763		19.2%
1960	1,458		91.1%
1970	2,883		97.7%
1980	5,764		99.9%
1990	7,242		25.6%
2000	10,345		42.8%
2010	14,541		40.6%
2020	19,565		34.6%
2025 (est.)	22,796		16.5%
Iowa Data Center

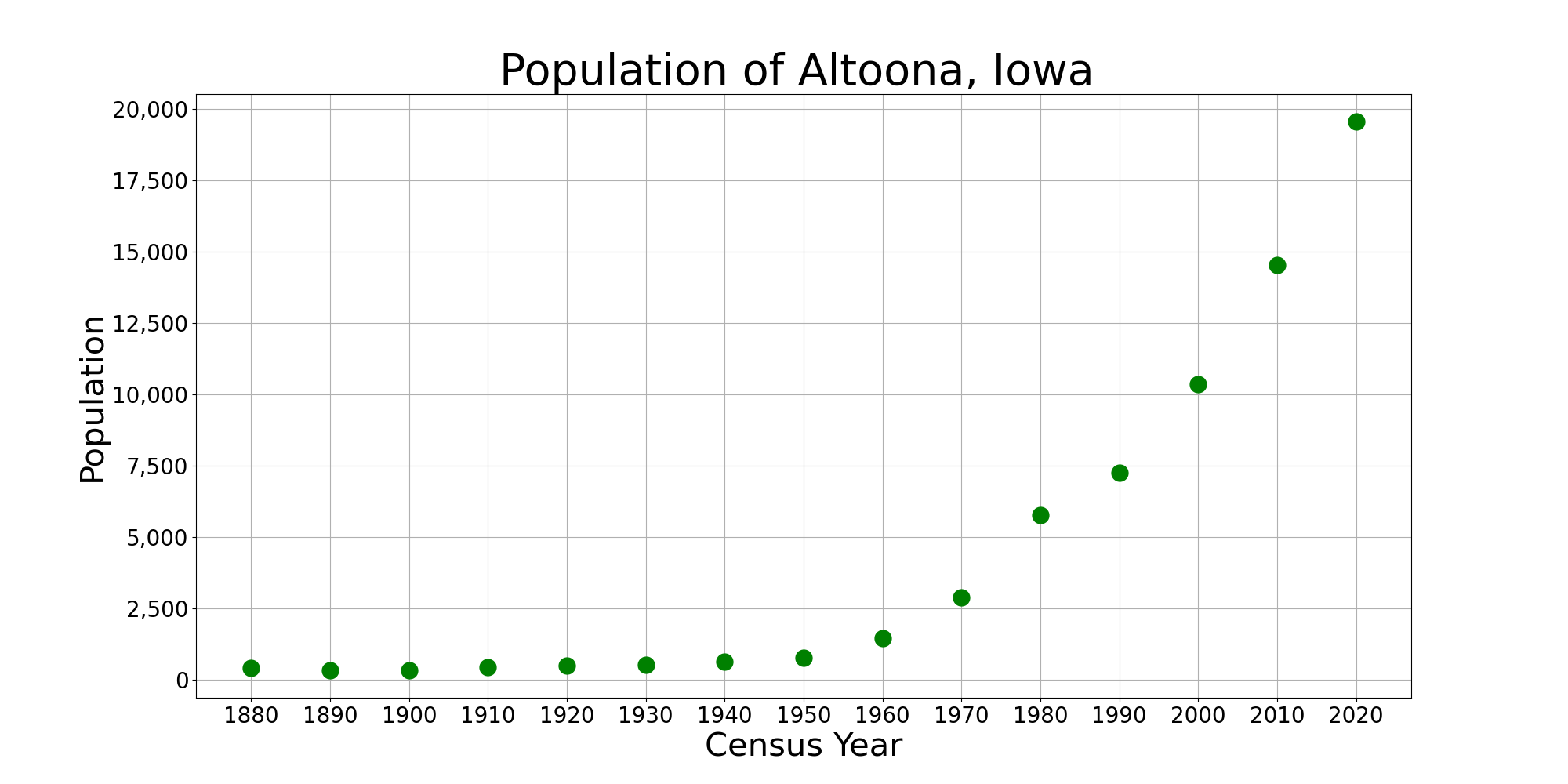
The population of Altoona, Iowa from US census data

=== 2020 census ===
As of the 2020 census, Altoona had a population of 19,565 with a population density of 1,675.1 inhabitants per square mile (646.8/km^{2}).

99.2% of residents lived in urban areas, while 0.8% lived in rural areas.

The city contained 7,575 households and 5,166 families; 34.2% of households had children under the age of 18 living in them. Of all households, 52.9% were married-couple households, 15.5% were households with a male householder and no spouse or partner present, and 24.9% were households with a female householder and no spouse or partner present. About 31.8% of households were non-families; 25.6% of all households were made up of individuals and 9.5% had someone living alone who was 65 years of age or older. There were 6.7% cohabiting couples.

There were 8,007 housing units, of which 5.4% were vacant. The homeowner vacancy rate was 1.5% and the rental vacancy rate was 8.8%.

The median age was 36.7 years. 26.0% of residents were under the age of 18 and 14.5% were 65 years of age or older. 28.2% of residents were under 20 years old; 5.8% were between the ages of 20 and 24; 27.4% were from 25 to 44; and 24.1% were from 45 to 64. For every 100 females there were 94.7 males, and for every 100 females age 18 and over there were 90.3 males age 18 and over.

Racial composition as of the 2020 census
Race	Number	Percent
White	16,930	86.5%
Black or African American	775	4.0%
American Indian and Alaska Native	54	0.3%
Asian	338	1.7%
Native Hawaiian and Other Pacific Islander	25	0.1%
Some other race	188	1.0%
Two or more races	1,255	6.4%
Hispanic or Latino (of any race)	950	4.9%

=== 2010 census ===
As of the census of 2010, there were 14,541 people, 5,459 households, and 3,945 families residing in the city. The population density was 1,555.2 inhabitants per square mile (600.5/km^{2}). There were 5,702 housing units at an average density of 609.8 per square mile (235.4/km^{2}). The racial makeup of the city was 95.1% White, 1.1% African American, 0.1% Native American, 1.1% Asian, 0.2% Pacific Islander, 0.9% from other races, and 1.5% from two or more races. Hispanic or Latino of any race were 2.9% of the population.

There were 5,459 households, of which 42.2% had children under the age of 18 living with them, 57.1% were married couples living together, 11.6% had a female householder with no husband present, 3.6% had a male householder with no wife present, and 27.7% were non-families. 22.6% of all households were made up of individuals, and 6.6% had someone living alone who was 65 years of age or older. The average household size was 2.64 and the average family size was 3.12.

The median age in the city was 33.7 years. 30% of residents were under the age of 18; 7.4% were between the ages of 18 and 24; 30.4% were from 25 to 44; 23.1% were from 45 to 64; and 9.1% were 65 years of age or older. The gender makeup of the city was 48.9% male and 51.1% female.

=== 2000 census ===
As of the census of 2000, there were 10,345 people, 3,850 households, and 2,895 families residing in the city. The population density was 1,835.4 inhabitants per square mile (708.7/km^{2}). There were 3,959 housing units at an average density of 557.3 per square mile (215.2/km^{2}). The racial makeup of the city was 97.11% White, 0.92% African American, 0.33% Native American, 0.46% Asian, 0.41% Pacific Islander, 0.77% from other races, and 1.20% from two or more races. Hispanic or Latino of any race were 1.65% of the population.

There were 3,850 households, out of which 43.7% had children under the age of 18 living with them, 58.5% were married couples living together, 14.0% had a female householder with no husband present, and 24.8% were non-families. 19.9% of all households were made up of individuals, and 5.4% had someone living alone who was 65 years of age or older. The average household size was 2.66 and the average family size was 3.08.

Age spread: 30.6% under the age of 18, 8.1% from 18 to 24, 33.3% from 25 to 44, 20.3% from 45 to 64, and 7.7% who were 65 years of age or older. The median age was 32 years. For every 100 females, there were 91.4 males. For every 100 females age 18 and over, there were 85.9 males.

The median income for a household in the city was $50,162, and the median income for a family was $58,306. Males had a median income of $36,030 versus $28,205 for females. The per capita income for the city was $20,336. About 4.0% of families and 5.5% of the population were below the poverty line, including 7.2% of those under age 18 and 4.2% of those age 65 or over.

== Education ==
Altoona (along with nearby Runnells, Mitchellville, and parts of Pleasant Hill and Des Moines) is part of the Southeast Polk Community School District, and its students attend Southeast Polk High School. The town is home to four of the district's eight elementary schools: Altoona, Centennial, Clay, and Willowbrook. The Altoona Elementary building also was the town's high school until it joined the Southeast Polk consolidation in 1962.

== Transportation ==
Transit in the city is provided by Des Moines Area Regional Transit. Routes 17 and 99 provide bus service connecting the city to the region.

== Notable people ==
- John Falsey (1951–2019), writer, director, and producer of TV shows such as Northern Exposure
- John Houbolt (1919–2014), Aerospace engineer promoted the lunar mission mode for going to the Moon and back
- Geri Huser (born 1963), Iowa state representative
- Kyle Orton (born 1982), NFL quarterback
- Ed Skinner (1936–2015), Iowa state representative
- Neal Edward Smith (1920–2021), U.S. Representative from Iowa
- Jamie Solinger, Miss Iowa Teen USA 1992, Miss Teen USA 1992, Miss Iowa USA 1998
