= Anthony Muñoz Award =

High school football award

The Anthony Muñoz Award is presented annually to the best lineman in high school football since 2009. It is named in honor of Pro Football Hall of Fame offense tackle Anthony Muñoz.

== Winners ==
List of Anthony Muñoz Award winners
Year	Player	Position	High school	Location	Ref.
2009	Seantrel Henderson	Offensive tackle	Cretin-Derham Hall	Saint Paul, Minnesota	
2010	Ray Drew	Defensive end	Thomas County Central	Thomasville, Georgia	
2011	D. J. Humphries	Offensive tackle	Mallard Creek	Charlotte, North Carolina	
2012	Steve Elmer	Offensive tackle	Midland	Midland, Michigan	
2013	Solomon Thomas	Defensive end	Coppell	Coppell, Texas	
2014	Martez Ivey	Offensive tackle	Apopka	Apopka, Florida	
2015	Derrick Brown	Defensive tackle	Lanier	Sugar Hill, Georgia	
2016	Foster Sarell	Offensive tackle	Graham-Kapowsin	Graham, Washington	
2017	Xavier Thomas	Defensive end	IMG Academy	Bradenton, Florida	
2018	Nolan Smith	Defensive end	IMG Academy	Bradenton, Florida	
2019	Paris Johnson Jr.	Offensive tackle	Princeton	Cincinnati, Ohio	
2020	Donovan Jackson	Offensive tackle	Episcopal	Bellaire, Texas	
2021	Josh Conerly Jr.	Offensive tackle	Rainier Beach	Seattle, Washington	
2022	Kadyn Proctor	Offensive tackle	Southeast Polk	Des Moines, Iowa	
2023	LJ McCray	Defensive end	Mainland	Daytona Beach, Florida	
2024	Amare Adams	Defensive tackle	South Florence	Florence, South Carolina	
2025	Felix Ojo	Offensive tackle	Lake Ridge	Mansfield, Texas	
