= Xavier Nwankpa =

American football player (born 2003)

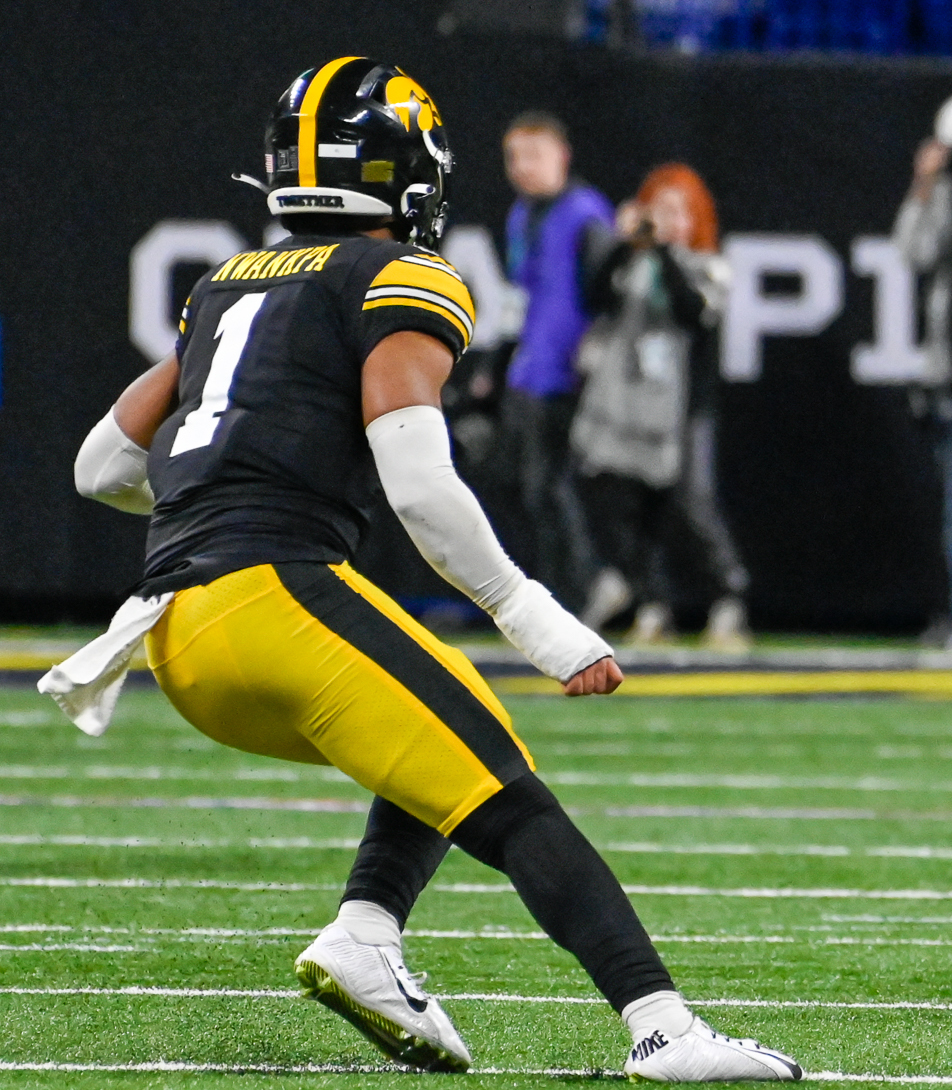

No. 29 – Kansas City Chiefs
- Position: Safety
- Roster status: Active

Personal information
- Born: December 8, 2003 (age 22); Altoona, Iowa
- Listed height: 6 ft 2 in (1.88 m)
- Listed weight: 213 lb (97 kg)

Career information
- High school: Southeast Polk (Pleasant Hill, Iowa)
- College: Iowa (2022–2025)
- NFL draft: 2026: undrafted

Career history
- Kansas City Chiefs (2026–present)

Awards and highlights
- Third-team All-Big Ten (2025)

Career NFL statistics as of Week 10, 2026
- Total tackles: 10
- Pass deflections: 1
- Interceptions: 1
- Stats at Pro Football Reference

Xavier Nwankpa (born December 8, 2003) is an American professional football safety for the Kansas City Chiefs of the National Football League (NFL). He played college football for the Iowa Hawkeyes.

== Early life ==
Nwankpa attended Southeast Polk High School in Pleasant Hill, Iowa. During his high school career he had 16 interceptions. He was selected to play in the 2022 All-American Bowl. A five-star recruit, Nwankpa committed to the University of Iowa to play college football. He was the highest rated recruit to ever commit to Iowa.

== College career ==
Nwankpa played in 12 games his true freshman year at Iowa in 2022 and made his first career start in the 2022 Music City Bowl, where he had an interception returned for a touchdown. He finished the season with 12 tackles. He returned to Iowa as a starter his sophomore year in 2023, making 12 starts, recording 42 tackles, one sack, and one interception. Nwankpa started 10 games as a junior in 2024, recording 41 tackles. During his senior season in 2025, Nwankpa moved to free safety and established a career high in tackles (76). He was named Big Ten Defensive Player of the Week after the win over Penn State and, after the regular season, named third-team All-Big Ten by conference coaches.

=== College statistics ===
Legend
**Bold**	Career high

Year	Team	Games		Tackles				Fumbles				Interceptions			
Year	Team	GP	GS	Cmb	Solo	Ast	Sck	FF	FR	Yds	TD	Int	Yds	TD	PD
2022	Iowa	12	1	12	11	1	0.0	0	0	0	0	**1**	**52**	**1**	1
2023	Iowa	**14**	12	42	27	15	**1.0**	0	0	0	0	**1**	0	0	**2**
2024	Iowa	13	10	41	29	12	0.0	0	0	0	0	0	0	0	1
2025	Iowa	13	**13**	**76**	**50**	**26**	0.0	**2**	0	0	0	**1**	28	0	0
Career		52	36	171	117	54	1.0	2	0	0	0	3	80	1	4

== Professional career ==
Pre-draft measurables
Height	Weight	Arm length	Hand span	Wingspan	40-yard dash	10-yard split	20-yard split	20-yard shuttle	Three-cone drill	Vertical jump	Bench press
6 ft 2 1/2 in (1.89 m)	208 lb (94 kg)	30 3/4 in (0.78 m)	8 1/4 in (0.21 m)	6 ft 3 1/2 in (1.92 m)	4.48 s	1.62 s	2.64 s	4.39 s	6.94 s	37.5 in (0.95 m)	14 reps
All values from NFL Combine/Pro Day

Nwankpa signed with the Kansas City Chiefs as an undrafted free agent on May 1, 2026.

In Week 4, Nwankpa had his first career interception off a pass by Las Vegas Raiders quarterback Kirk Cousins at the 36-yard line in opposing territory, which would wound up be the game-winning play with one second left to play in the 30–27 win against the Raiders.
