= Kadyn Proctor =

American football player (born 2005)

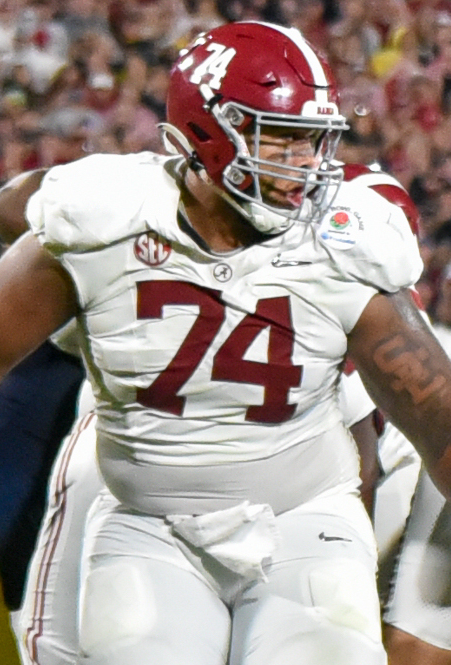
- Proctor with the Alabama Crimson Tide in 2024

No. 74 – Miami Dolphins
- Position: Guard
- Roster status: Active

Personal information
- Born: June 4, 2005 (age 21)
- Listed height: 6 ft 7 in (2.01 m)
- Listed weight: 352 lb (160 kg)

Career information
- High school: Southeast Polk (Pleasant Hill, Iowa)
- College: Alabama (2023–2025)
- NFL draft: 2026: 1st round, 12th overall pick

Career history
- Miami Dolphins (2026–present)

Awards and highlights
- Consensus All-American (2025); Jacobs Blocking Trophy (2025); Second-team All-SEC (2024); Freshman All-American (2023)

Career NFL statistics as of Week 9, 2026
- Games played: 7
- Games started: 7
- Stats at Pro Football Reference

Kadyn Proctor (born June 4, 2005) is an American professional football guard for the Miami Dolphins of the National Football League (NFL). He played college football for the Alabama Crimson Tide and was selected by the Dolphins in the first round of the 2026 NFL draft.

== Early life ==
Proctor was born on June 4, 2005. He attended Southeast Polk High School. He won the Anthony Muñoz Award as a senior. He was rated as a five-star recruit and one of the best players in the 2023 college football recruiting class. He was ranked at No. 7 overall (No. 1 among offensive linemen) by 247Sports and No. 10 by ESPN.com. He was also the No. 1 recruit from the state of Iowa.

== College career ==
=== Alabama ===
After initially committing to the University of Iowa, Proctor flipped his commitment to Alabama on early signing day in December 2022. He enrolled at Alabama in 2023. Prior to the start of the 2023 season, Alabama coach Nick Saban noted: "He's shown me he's big, and he's made a lot of progress. He's improved a lot."

=== Iowa ===
On January 20, 2024, Proctor transferred to Iowa, whom he committed to coming out of high school before switching to Alabama.

=== Return to Alabama ===
Prior to April 16, 2024, when the NCAA transfer portal officially opened, it was announced that Proctor was transferring back to Alabama.

In the 2025 game against Georgia, Proctor lined up as an eligible receiver for one play. He caught a short pass and ran for 11 yards and a crucial first down on the Georgia two yard line, setting up a touchdown on the next play.

== Professional career ==
Pre-draft measurables
Height	Weight	Arm length	Hand span	Wingspan	40-yard dash	10-yard split	20-yard split	20-yard shuttle	Three-cone drill	Vertical jump	Broad jump	Bench press
6 ft 6 5/8 in (2.00 m)	352 lb (160 kg)	33 3/8 in (0.85 m)	9 3/4 in (0.25 m)	6 ft 9 5/8 in (2.07 m)	5.21 s	1.84 s	3.03 s	4.78 s	7.78 s	32.5 in (0.83 m)	9 ft 1 in (2.77 m)	25 reps
All values from NFL Combine/Pro Day

Proctor was selected by the Miami Dolphins in the first round, 12th overall, of the 2026 NFL draft.

== Personal life ==
Proctor's cousin, Paul Perkins played in the NFL for the New York Giants and Detroit Lions from 2016 to 2019; another cousin, Bryce Perkins, played five games at quarterback for the Los Angeles Rams in 2022.
