= Berwick, Iowa =

- unincorporated community
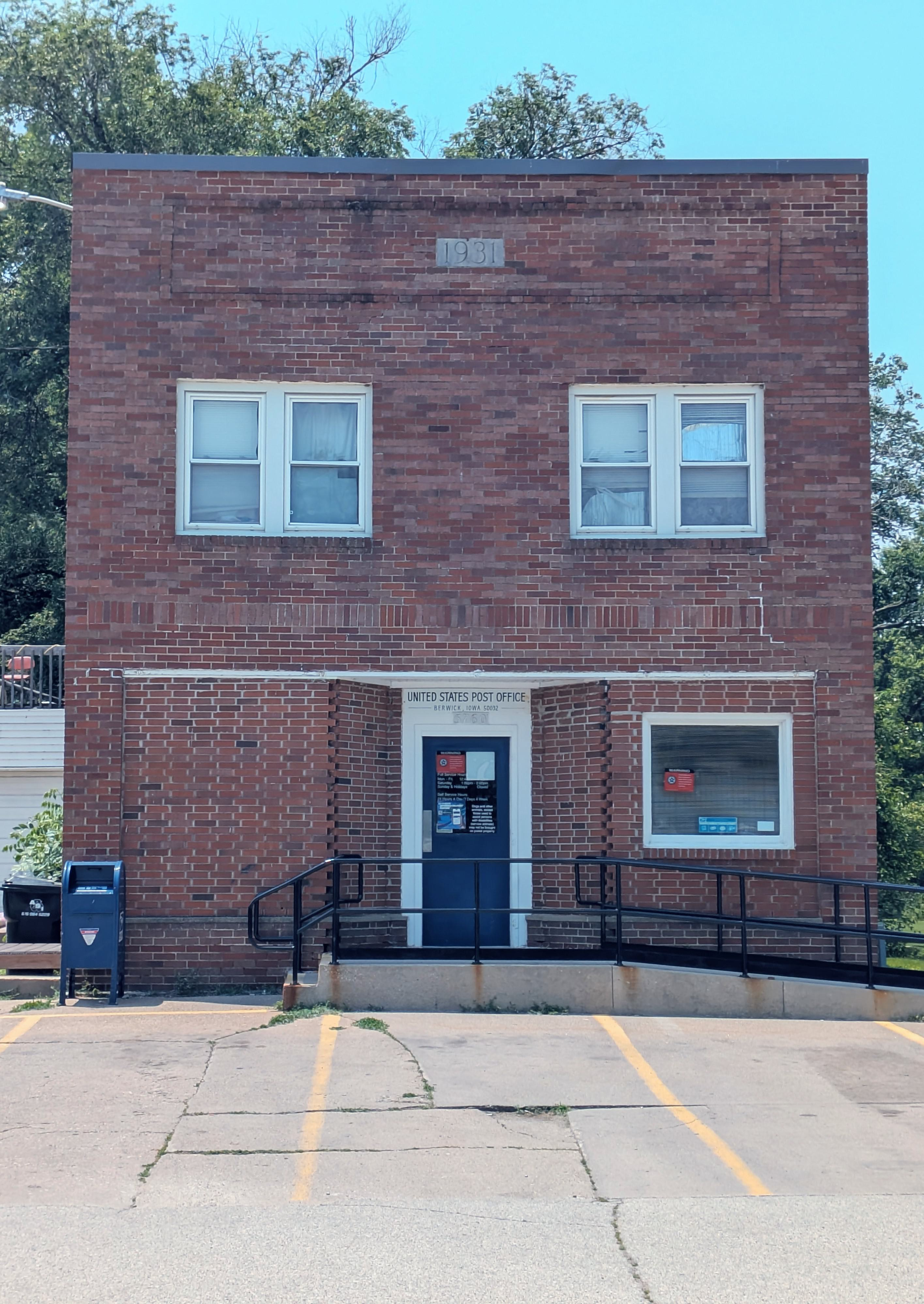
- Berwick post office

- Location within Iowa
- Coordinates: 41°39′54″N 93°32′42″W
- Country: United States
- State: Iowa
- County: Polk
- Township: Delaware
- Elevation: 850 ft (260 m)
- Time zone: UTC-6 (Central (CST))
  - Summer (DST): UTC-5 (CDT)
- ZIP code: 50032
- Area code: 515
- GNIS feature ID: 454534

Berwick is an unincorporated community in Delaware Township, Polk County, Iowa, United States, on the east bank of Fourmile Creek. It is part of the Des Moines–West Des Moines Metropolitan Statistical Area.

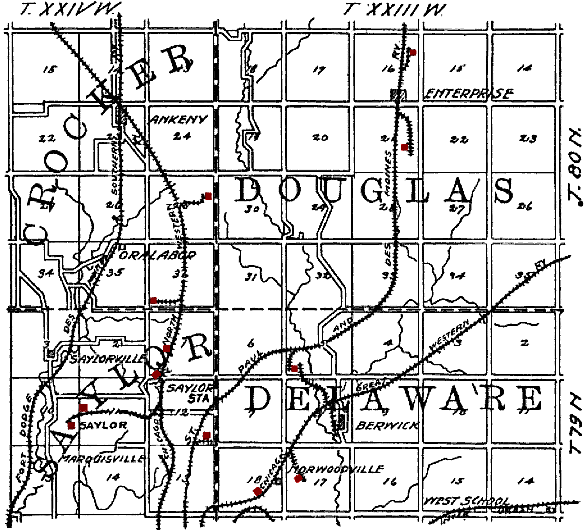
Map of the Berwick area from 1908, showing the railroads and coal mines (red) of the region. Berwick is in the lower center.

== History ==
Berwick's population in 1902 was 72, and was 80 in 1925.

In the early 20th century, Berwick and Norwoodville, a mile southwest, were home to several coal mines. The Norwood-White shaft No. 1 (also known as the Klondike No. 1) was 215 feet (66 m) deep, accessing a 4-foot-thick (1.2 m) coal seam. By 1908, this mine extended over roughly 200 acres (0.81 km^{2}). Norwood-White shaft No. 2 was half a mile to the east. This mine was newer, covering over 40 acres (160,000 m^{2}) in 1908. The Delaware Coal Company had a shaft a mile northwest of Berwick, with a shaft 170 feet (52 m) deep. By 1908, this mine covered less than 15 acres (61,000 m^{2}). In 1914, Norwood-White produced over 100,000 tons of coal, ranking among the top 24 coal producers in the state. In 1912, United Mine Workers Local 318 in Berwick had 220 members, and Local 845 in Norwoodville, one mile south, had 129 members.

The population was 150 in 1940.
