= Kyle Orton =

American football player (born 1982)

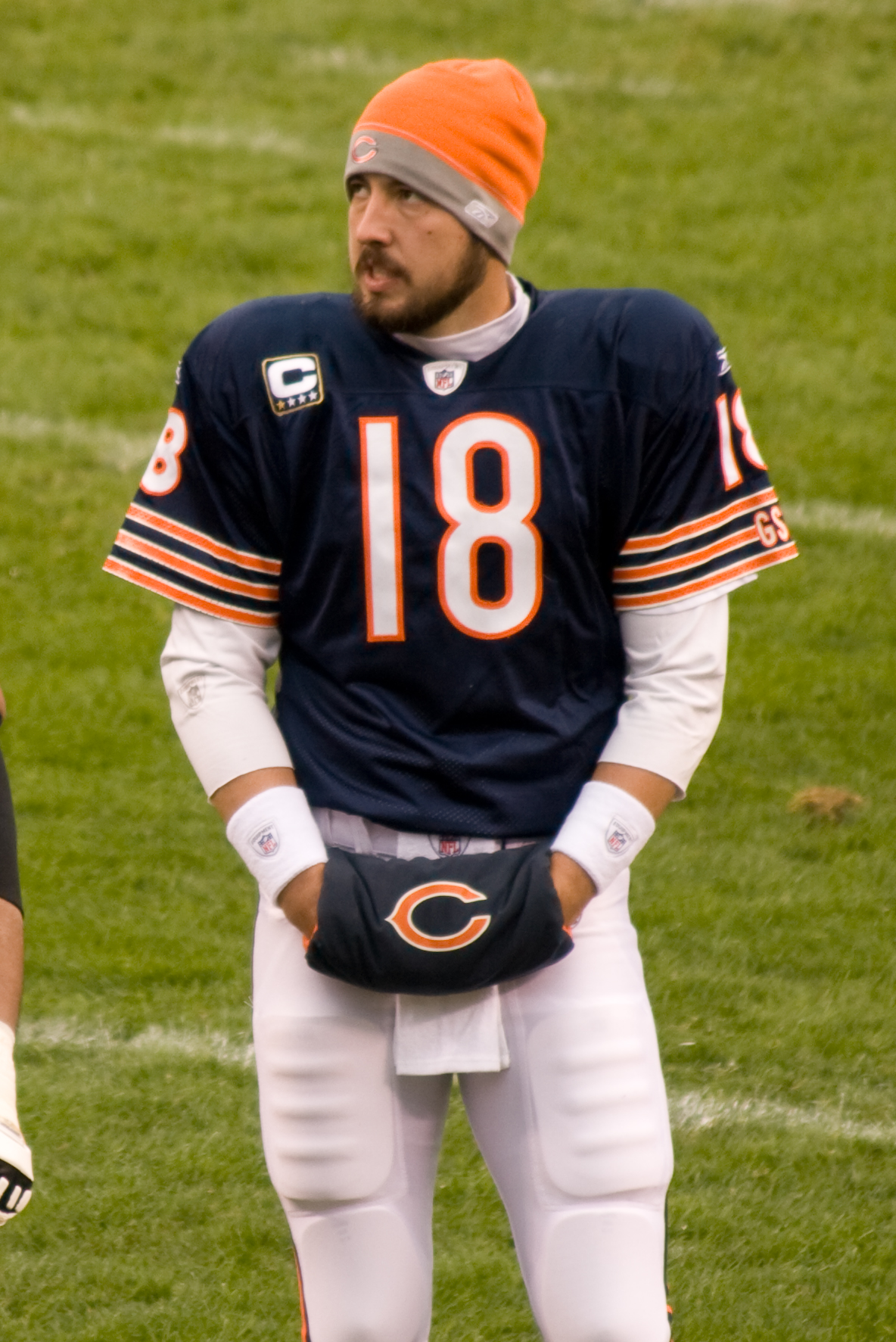
- Orton with the Chicago Bears in 2008

No. 18, 8
- Position: Quarterback

Personal information
- Born: November 14, 1982 (age 44); Altoona, Iowa, U.S.
- Listed height: 6 ft 4 in (1.93 m)
- Listed weight: 228 lb (103 kg)

Career information
- High school: Southeast Polk (Pleasant Hill, Iowa)
- College: Purdue (2001–2004)
- NFL draft: 2005: 4th round, 106th overall pick

Career history
- Chicago Bears (2005–2008); Denver Broncos (2009–2011); Kansas City Chiefs (2011); Dallas Cowboys (2012–2013); Buffalo Bills (2014)

Awards and highlights
- PFWA All-Rookie Team (2005); East-West Shrine Game (2005); Senior Bowl (2005); First-team All-Big Ten (2004); Hendricks Trophy (Sun Bowl MVP) (2002)

Career NFL statistics
- Passing attempts: 2,712
- Passing completions: 1,613
- Completion percentage: 59.5%
- TD–INT: 101–69
- Passing yards: 18,037
- Passer rating: 81.2
- Stats at Pro Football Reference

Kyle Raymond Orton (born November 14, 1982) is an American former professional football player who was a quarterback in the National Football League (NFL). He played college football for Purdue, where he started four straight bowl games. He was selected by the Chicago Bears in the fourth round of the 2005 NFL draft. After an injury to Bears starter Rex Grossman, Orton was pressed into service as the starting quarterback during his rookie year, starting the first 14 games of the 2005 season, but was replaced by Grossman for the playoffs that year. Orton did not play at all in 2006, and sparingly in 2007. He regained his starting job from Grossman in 2008, but the team finished a disappointing 9–7 and out of the playoffs. In the offseason of that year, he was traded to the Denver Broncos.

Orton spent the next three seasons with Broncos, where he amassed a 12–21 record as a starting quarterback over three seasons. He lost his starting role to Tim Tebow during the 2011 season and was released by the team. Orton was claimed off waivers by the Kansas City Chiefs. He spent the next three seasons as a back-up quarterback for the Dallas Cowboys and Buffalo Bills. Orton became the Bills' starting quarterback in 2014, where he went 7–5. He retired after the season.

== Early life ==
Orton attended Southeast Polk High School in Pleasant Hill, Iowa, where he was a four-sport star in football, basketball, tennis, and track & field.

At the end of his high school career, Orton was the No. 2 ranked quarterback in the nation by SuperPrep and No. 7 by Rivals.com. His career passing statistics were 208 for 450 (46.2%), 3,176 yards with 24 touchdowns, and 18 interceptions. He earned honorable mention all-state and first-team all-conference his senior year, after completing 95 of 192 attempts (49.5%), 1,366 yards with 12 touchdowns, and 5 interceptions.

Orton wore uniform No. 18 in honor of former Nebraska quarterback Brook Berringer, who died in a plane crash in 1996.

== College career ==
Orton committed to Purdue, but considered attending Colorado before ultimately deciding on the former. Orton started in the 2001, 2002 and 2004 Sun Bowl, and the 2003 Capital One Bowl. He is the only Purdue quarterback to start four consecutive bowl games (Drew Brees and Mark Herrmann started three straight). During his undergraduate years at Purdue, Orton was a member of the Pi Kappa Alpha fraternity.

In 2004, Orton was the preseason third-team All-American quarterback, behind USC's Matt Leinart and Oklahoma's Jason White as well as a Heisman Trophy hopeful early in the season. After starting the season 5–0 the Boilermakers lost 4 straight close games. During that stretch Orton suffered injuries against Michigan and Northwestern. Brandon Kirsch took over for Orton in the 3rd quarter against Northwestern and Orton subsequently missed the game the following week against Iowa. Orton was able to return to the field in the 4th quarter against Ohio State to help the Boilermakers get the go ahead TD to overcome the Buckeyes and snap their losing streak. The following week the Boilermaker's defeated their rival, Indiana Hoosiers, 63–24. During that game Orton tied former Purdue quarterback Drew Brees' record for number of passing yards in a game (522). That record stood until 2018 when David Blough threw for 572 yards in a game against University of Missouri.

Orton makes a cameo in NCAA Football 2006, where he says, "EA Sports, it's in the game", along with Derek Anderson in the game's introduction.

== Professional career ==
Pre-draft measurables
Height	Weight	Arm length	Hand span	40-yard dash	10-yard split	20-yard split	20-yard shuttle	Three-cone drill	Vertical jump	Wonderlic
6 ft 4 in (1.93 m)	233 lb (106 kg)	30 1/4 in (0.77 m)	10 in (0.25 m)	5.11 s	1.78 s	2.96 s	4.52 s	7.38 s	26 1/2 in (0.67 m)	26
All values from NFL Combine

=== Chicago Bears ===
==== 2005 ====
Orton was drafted by the Chicago Bears in the fourth round of the 2005 NFL draft. In the 2005 NFL season, he was rushed into the Bears starting lineup as a rookie after a preseason injury to starter Rex Grossman, and the poor play of back-up Chad Hutchinson. Orton started 15 games of the season, but was replaced by Grossman after halftime during the Bears' Week 15 victory against the Atlanta Falcons. After sitting for Week 16, Orton started the regular season finale, Week 17, against the Minnesota Vikings. The outcome of this game, for the Chicago Bears, did not have any effect on their post-season hopes. The Bears had already clinched the NFC North championship and a first-round bye in the 2005–06 playoffs with their Week 16 victory over the Green Bay Packers. Grossman then started for the Bears in their only post-season game. They lost to the Carolina Panthers.

Overall, the Bears had a record of 10–5 in games that Orton started, including an eight-game winning streak after a 1–3 start. Despite the team's success, Orton finished with the lowest quarterback rating in the NFL (59.7) among all "qualified" quarterbacks (those with 224+ pass attempts). Despite the low rating, the Bears coaches repeatedly insisted that they were pleased with Orton's performance. The coaching staff asked Orton to minimize mistakes and to let the rushing attack and the defense win ballgames rather than employing an aggressive passing attack.

Measuring Orton's victories, his rookie season was successful. His 15 starts and 10 victories are both rookie records for Bears quarterbacks. 10 rookie wins is also sixth most in the NFL since 1970. As of 2017, Orton held at least 5 other Bears rookie franchise records, including completions (190), attempts (368), passing yards (1,869), passing TDs (9), and interceptions in a single game (5 on September 25 against Cincinnati).

==== 2006 ====
Following the 2005 season, the Bears signed veteran Brian Griese as the team's second-string quarterback. Orton, now demoted, became the Bears’ third-string quarterback, and did not see any action throughout the entire 2006 season.

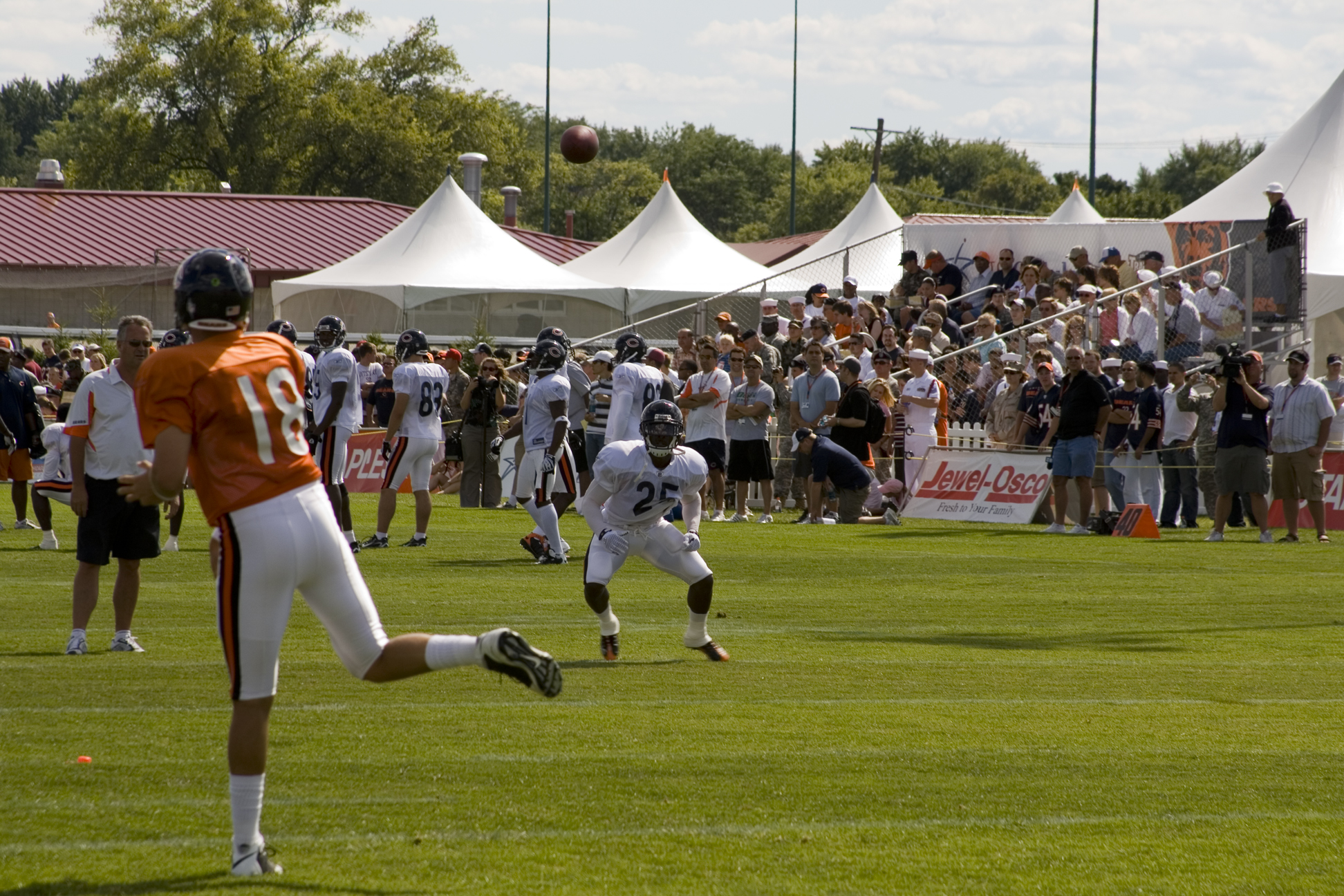
Orton throws a pass to Garrett Wolfe.

==== 2007 ====
The following off-season, the Bears acquired Chris Leak, who had previously led the Florida Gators to a BCS Championship, shortly after the 2007 NFL draft. Leak struggled in training camp, while Orton, who had trained in the off-season, excelled but was placed at third string. According to the Chicago Tribune, Orton was en route to overtake Griese's (then) second string position. Orton continued to show signs of improvement in the preseason. He completed sixteen of twenty-five passes for 151 yards and one touchdown en route to leading the Bears to a comeback victory over the Houston Texans.

After the Bears lost their chances of making a postseason berth, Lovie Smith chose to start Orton over Griese. Orton made his first start in nearly two seasons on December 17, 2007, against the Minnesota Vikings. The Bears lost the game 20–13. Orton finished with 22 completions on 38 attempts, 184 yards, and 1 interception. He improved in the final two games of the season, leading the Bears to two consecutive victories, passing for 294 yards, 3 touchdowns and an interception.

==== 2008 ====
On February 25, 2008, the Bears and Orton agreed to a one-year contract extension running through the 2009 season. Competition for the starting quarterback job was expected to be fierce with Rex Grossman, during training camp.

On August 18, after deadlock against Grossman in games with the Kansas City Chiefs and Seattle Seahawks, Bears head coach Lovie Smith named Orton the team's starting QB for the 2008 season in Week 3 of the preseason, despite not throwing a pass over 17 yards or for a touchdown in the first two preseason games.

On September 7, 2008, Orton led the Bears to a 29–13 victory over the Indianapolis Colts in the first regular season game of the season. He threw for a career-high 334 yards and two touchdowns, while completing 24 of 34 passes in a 34–7 victory over the Detroit Lions. He finished the game with a career-high, at that time, passer rating of 121.4.

From the start of November 2008, Kyle Orton passed for ten touchdowns, and four interceptions, leading the Bears to a 4–3 record. Orton sustained an ankle injury against the Detroit Lions in Week 9 of the NFL season, and did not start the next week. He rushed himself back into the starting lineup a week after Grossman had a solid outing coming off the bench against the Titans. After his return, Orton threw eight touchdowns, and eight interceptions while averaging a quarterback rating of 66.9, including ratings of 39.1 against Minnesota, 49.2 against New Orleans, and 48.7 against Green Bay.

The Bears finished the season with a 9–7 record, while missing the playoffs by one game. Coach Lovie Smith was pleased with Orton's performance and believed he would be the team's starting quarterback for the following season. However, Jerry Angelo, the team's general manager, stated he wished to further solidify the quarterback position in the long run.

=== Denver Broncos ===
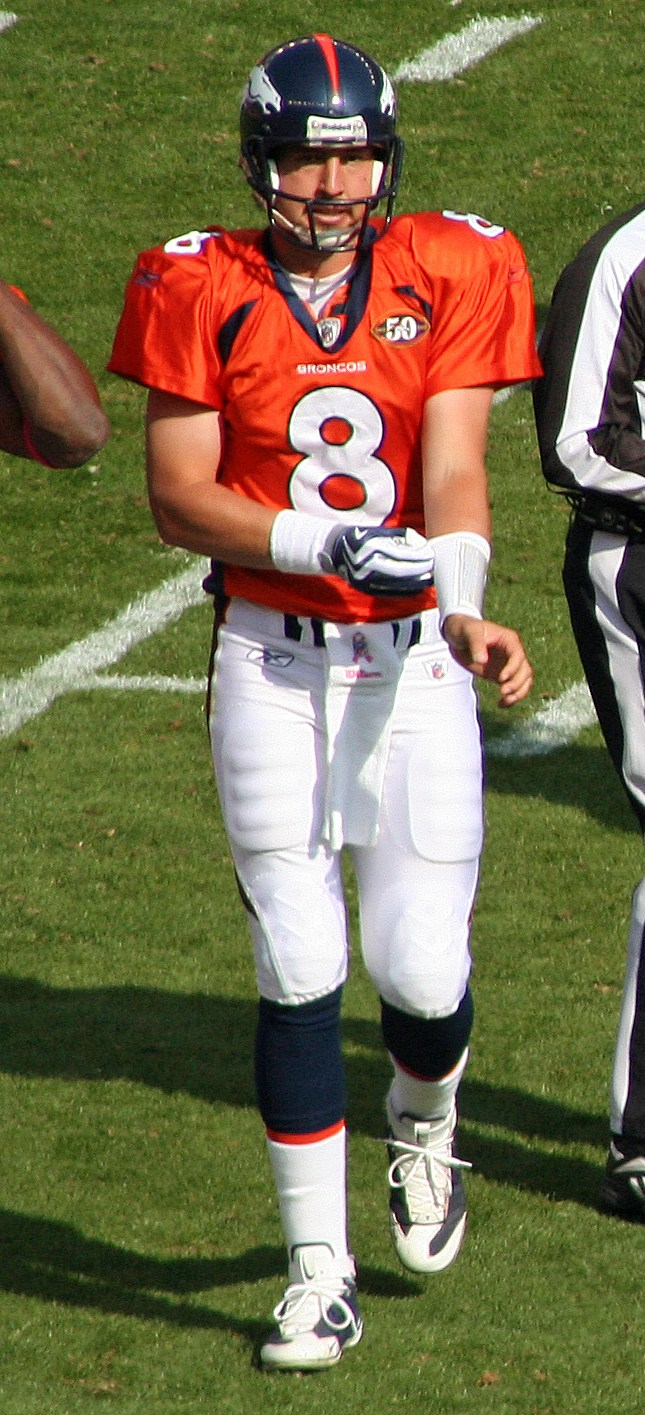
Orton with the Broncos

==== 2009 ====
On April 2, 2009, the Bears traded Orton (along with their first and third-round draft picks in 2009 and their first-round pick in '10) to the Denver Broncos for Pro Bowl quarterback Jay Cutler and the Broncos' fifth round pick in '09.

On June 13, Broncos head coach Josh McDaniels declared Orton the starting quarterback for the season. Orton led the Broncos to a 12–7 victory in the 2009 season opener against the Cincinnati Bengals. The game was won on a deflected pass that landed in the arms of Brandon Stokley who took it 87 yards for a touchdown.

Over the next five weeks, Orton led the Broncos to a surprising 6–0 record to begin the season. His most impressive effort in that streak came against the New England Patriots, when he completed 35–48 passes for 330 yards and orchestrated a 98-yard drive to tie the game and send it into overtime. He threw his first interception of the season to Randy Moss, who came in to help on the attempted Hail Mary pass, at the end of the first half. It was his first in 173 pass attempts which dated back to 2008 when he was with the Chicago Bears. He led another drive for the game-winning field goal in overtime. On October 13, 2009, Orton was named the AFC Offensive Player of the Week, for that effort.

On November 15, Orton suffered an ankle injury on the road against the Washington Redskins. He came out of the game at halftime with a career-high passer rating of 134.7. The injury kept him from starting the next game against the Chargers. He did return partway through that game, replacing Chris Simms.

For the 2009 season (playing in 16 games with 15 starts), Orton threw 21 touchdown passes and 12 interceptions with an 86.8 QB rating.

==== 2010 ====
Orton was named the Broncos starting quarterback for 2010. He signed a one-year contract extension (through the 2011 season), on August 19, 2010. On September 26, 2010, Orton threw for 476 yards against the Indianapolis Colts, a career-high. Less than two months later, November 14, Orton threw a career-high four touchdown passes against the Kansas City Chiefs. Later in the season, with the Broncos eliminated from playoff contention, Orton played poorly against the Arizona Cardinals on December 12, 2010. Tim Tebow was named the starter the following week by interim coach Eric Studesville and played the last three games of the season. Orton finished the season with 3,653 yards, 20 touchdowns, and nine interceptions.

==== 2011 ====
Orton entered the 2011 season as the Broncos starting quarterback. The team had a 1–4 start with Orton throwing 8 touchdowns and 7 interceptions as the starter, accumulating 979 yards and completing 58.7% of his passes. He was replaced as the starter by Tim Tebow during the week 5 contest against the San Diego Chargers, and Orton never took another snap for the Broncos. Orton was waived on November 22, 2011, officially ending his tenure with the Denver Broncos. He had a record of 12–21 as a starter during his time with the Broncos, throwing for 8,434 yards, 49 touchdowns, and 28 interceptions.

=== Kansas City Chiefs ===
He was claimed off waivers by the Kansas City Chiefs on November 23, 2011, after a season-ending injury to starting quarterback Matt Cassel. Kansas City paid $2.5 million remaining on Orton's nearly $8.9 million salary for the year. Chicago (looking to replace injured Jay Cutler) and the Dallas Cowboys (because of concerns of injuries to backup quarterback Jon Kitna) also made claims on him. However, since Kansas City had a worse record than the other two teams it was given priority in claiming him per the NFL's inverse order of the standings rule on the waiver priority list.

On December 4, 2011, in a game against his former team, the Chicago Bears, Orton came into the second quarter to relieve Tyler Palko, but was injured on his first pass attempt. Palko led the Chiefs to a 10–3 win over the Bears, but struggled the following week in a 37–10 loss to the Jets.

Palko's injury paved the way for a quarterback change, and on December 18, Orton was named the starting Chiefs' quarterback by new interim coach Romeo Crennel. In his first game as their starter, he led the Chiefs to a 19–14 upset of the previously undefeated Green Bay Packers, ending the defending 2011 Super Bowl champions winning streak at 19 games, dating back to the previous season. He completed 23 of 31 passes for 299 yards with no interceptions and no passing touchdowns.

In the final two games of the season, Orton lost 16–13 in overtime against the Raiders before returning to Denver to defeat the Broncos in the season finale.

=== Dallas Cowboys ===
On March 14, 2012, Orton signed a three-year contract with the Dallas Cowboys to replace former backup quarterback Jon Kitna, who retired after the Cowboys' 2011 season. In week 4 against the Bears, his former team, Orton replaced Tony Romo late in the game and threw a 5-yard touchdown pass to Jason Witten, though the Bears still won the contest 34–18. The Cowboys went on to finish the season 8–8, losing to the Washington Redskins in a do-or-die week 17 contest.

In the 2013 season, Orton had seen minimal time on the field with a total of 40 passing yards which all came during week 14 against the Chicago Bears. On December 27, 2013, head coach Jason Garrett announced that Orton would be the starting quarterback for the week 17 game against the Philadelphia Eagles after Tony Romo underwent back surgery. He threw for 30 completions and 358 yards on 46 attempts (65.2%) and two touchdowns. He threw an early interception by Mychal Kendricks which was dropped by Witten, and another interception by Brandon Boykin on the Cowboys' last drive which secured a 24–22 victory for the Eagles.

=== Buffalo Bills ===
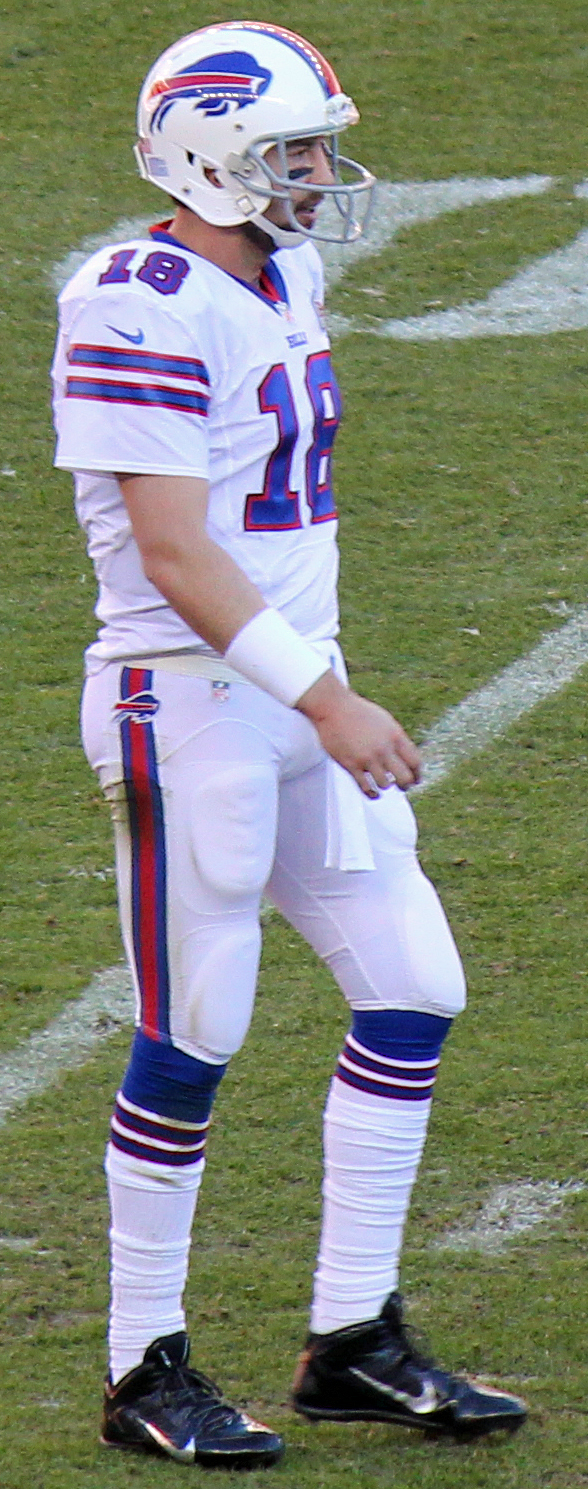
Orton during the 2014 season.

Prior to the 2014 NFL season, Orton threatened the Cowboys with a possible retirement and did not report to any of the team's organized team activities or workouts. Besides accumulating $70,000 in fines, quarterback coach Wade Wilson reported that Orton did not maintain any communications with the Cowboys during this period. Orton, who risked losing part of his signing bonus by holding out, eventually showed up to training camp. The team released him on July 15 and promoted Brandon Weeden to the backup quarterback position. The Cowboys were relieved of Orton's $3.25 million salary in 2014, but still had to pay him a signing bonus. He would follow Jeremiah Ratliff as the second player in two straight years to force the Cowboys to waive him.

On August 29, 2014, Orton agreed on a two-year deal with the Buffalo Bills, with the team paying him $5 million in the first year alone, making him the highest paid backup quarterback in the league. On September 29, 2014, at the beginning of week 5, Bills head coach Doug Marrone announced that Orton would become the new starting quarterback for the Bills in relief of EJ Manuel. Taking over with the team at 2–2, Orton led the Bills to a 9–7 finish. Though they missed the playoffs, the 2014 season marked the first time since 2004 that the Bills had finished with a winning record. Orton finished the season with 3,018 passing yards, 18 touchdowns, 10 interceptions and an 87.8 quarterback rating.

On December 29, 2014, Orton announced his retirement from the NFL.

== Career statistics ==
Legend
**Bold**	Career high

=== NFL ===
Year	Team	Games			Passing								Rushing				Sacks	
Year	Team	GP	GS	Record	Cmp	Att	Pct	Yds	Avg	TD	Int	Rtg	Att	Yds	Avg	TD	Sck	SckY
2005	CHI	15	15	**10–5**	190	368	51.6	1,869	5.1	9	**13**	59.7	**24**	44	1.8	0	30	190
2006	CHI	0	0	DNP														
2007	CHI	3	3	2–1	43	80	53.8	478	6.0	3	2	73.9	5	−1	−0.2	0	2	12
2008	CHI	15	15	9–6	272	465	58.5	2,972	6.4	18	12	79.6	**24**	49	2.0	**3**	27	160
2009	DEN	16	15	8–7	**336**	**541**	62.1	**3,802**	7.0	**21**	12	86.8	**24**	71	3.0	0	29	159
2010	DEN	13	13	3–10	293	498	58.8	3,653	7.3	20	9	87.5	22	**98**	4.4	0	**34**	**243**
2011	DEN	5	5	1–4	91	155	58.7	979	6.3	8	7	75.7	5	17	3.4	0	9	49
2011	KC	4	3	2–1	59	97	60.8	779	8.0	1	2	81.1	6	−4	−0.7	0	1	5
2012	DAL	1	0	–	9	10	**90.0**	89	**8.9**	1	0	**137.1**	0	0	0.0	0	0	0
2013	DAL	3	1	0–1	33	51	64.7	398	7.8	2	2	85.3	1	8	**8.0**	0	0	0
2014	BUF	12	12	7–5	287	447	64.2	3,018	6.8	18	10	87.8	15	14	0.9	1	33	198
Total		87	82	42–40	1,613	2,712	59.5	18,037	6.7	101	69	81.2	126	296	2.3	4	132	818

=== College ===
Season	Team	GP	Passing							Rushing		
Season	Team	GP	Cmp	Att	Pct	Yds	TD	Int	Rtg	Att	Yds	TD
2001	Purdue	6	69	142	48.6	686	2	3	92.1	27	−63	0
2002	Purdue	13	192	317	60.6	2,257	13	**9**	128.2	43	47	0
2003	Purdue	13	**251**	**414**	60.6	2,885	15	7	127.7	**112**	**237**	**3**
2004	Purdue	11	236	389	**60.7**	**3,090**	**31**	5	**151.1**	80	112	**3**
Totals		43	748	1,262	59.3	8,918	61	24	128.9	262	333	6

== Personal life ==
After retiring from the NFL in 2014, Orton and his wife moved to Baton Rouge, Louisiana, to raise their daughter. Orton intends to mentor high school and college-level football players in Louisiana.

Orton's father, Byron Orton, served on the Iowa Labor Commission. Orton said that running for the United States Congress "is definitely something that I want to do when I get older."

Orton is currently coaching for his high school alma mater, Southeast Polk in Pleasant Hill, Iowa, as an assistant coach.
