= Ed Skinner =

American lawyer and politician (1936–2015)

Edwin Skinner

Member of the Iowa House of Representatives
- In office 1969–1973

Personal details
- Born: February 9, 1936 Iowa, U.S.
- Died: January 12, 2015 (aged 78)
- Party: Democratic
- Occupation: lawyer

Edwin Walter "Ed" Skinner (February 9, 1936 – January 12, 2015) was an American politician in the state of Iowa.

From Runnells, Iowa, Skinner went to Drake University, University of Iowa, and received his law degree from Drake University Law School. He practiced law in Altoona, Iowa and was the city attorney for the cities of Altoona and Pleasant Hill, Iowa. Skinner was a Democrat who served in the Iowa House of Representatives from 1969 to 1973. He died in Des Moines, Iowa.
