= Amare Adams =

American football player (born 2006)

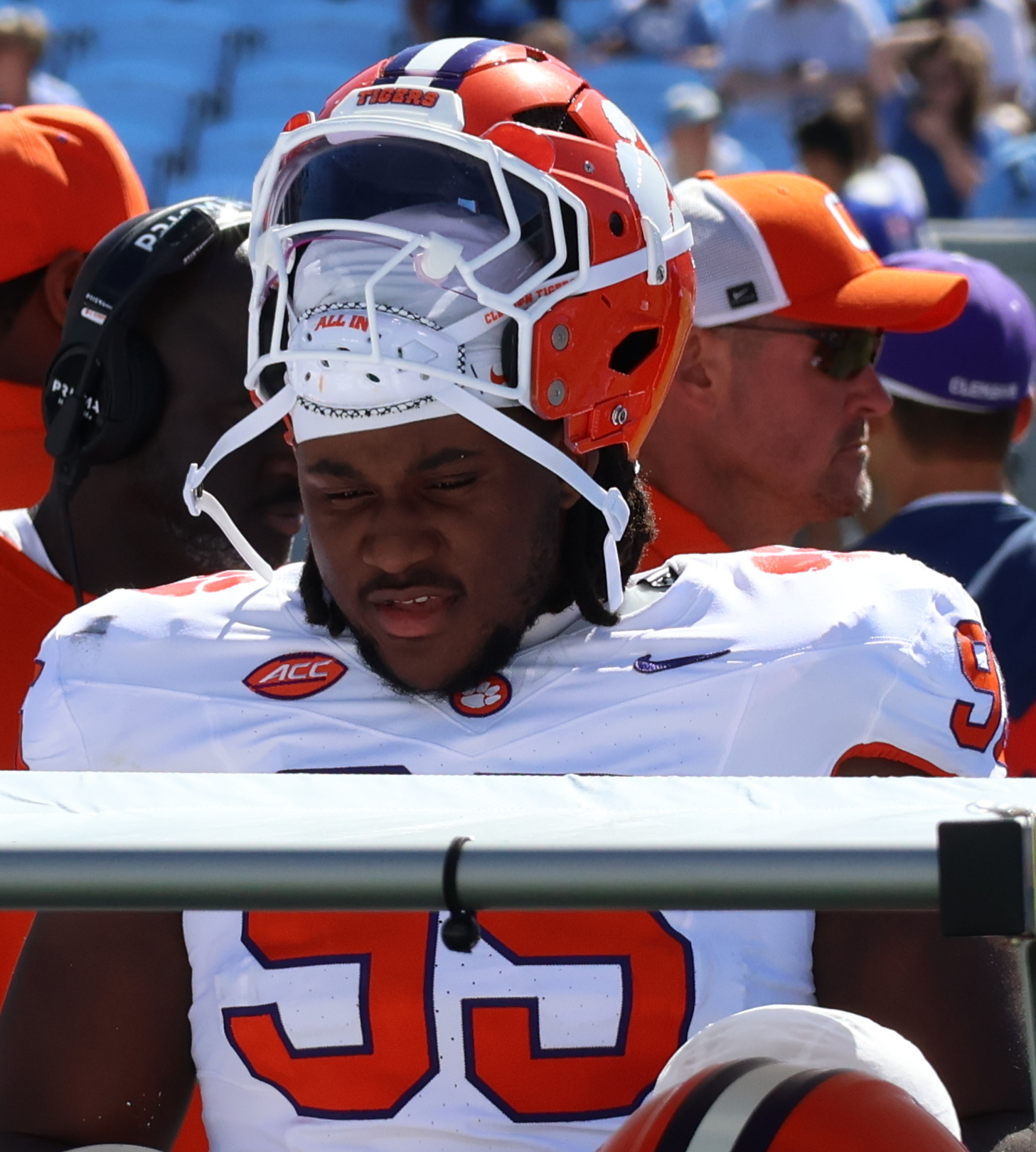
- Adams with the Clemson Tigers in 2025

No. 95 – Clemson Tigers
- Position: Defensive tackle
- Class: Sophomore

Personal information
- Born: October 18, 2006 (age 20)
- Listed height: 6 ft 4 in (1.93 m)
- Listed weight: 310 lb (141 kg)

Career information
- High school: South Florence (Florence, South Carolina)
- College: Clemson (2025–present)

Awards and highlights
- Anthony Muñoz Award (2024)

Amare Adams (born October 18, 2006) is an American college football defensive tackle for the Clemson Tigers.

== Early life ==
Adams attended South Florence High School in Florence, South Carolina. As a senior in 2024, he was named the Morning News Player of the Year after recording 75 tackles and six sacks. Adams was selected to play in the 2025 Navy All-American Bowl, where he was named the Anthony Muñoz Award winner. A five-star recruit, he committed to Clemson University to play college football. Adams also played basketball in high school.

== College career ==
Adams enrolled at Clemson in January 2025.

=== Statistics ===
College statistics
Year	Team	Class	Games	Tackles				
Year	Team	Class	Games	Total	Solo	Ast	TFL	Sacks
2025	Clemson	FR	10	5	1	4	0.0	0.0
Career			10	5	1	4	0.0	0.0
