= Felix Ojo =

American football player (born 2008)

No. 51 – Texas Tech Red Raiders
- Position: Offensive tackle
- Class: Freshman

Personal information
- Born: July 4, 2008 (age 18); Mansfield, Texas, U.S.
- Listed height: 6 ft 6 in (1.98 m)
- Listed weight: 295 lb (134 kg)

Career information
- High school: Lake Ridge (Mansfield, Texas)
- College: Texas Tech (2026–present)

Awards and highlights
- Anthony Muñoz Award (2025)

Felix Ojo (born July 4, 2008) is an American college football offensive tackle for the Texas Tech Red Raiders.

== Early life ==
Ojo was born in Mansfield, Texas. He attended Lake Ridge High School where he competed in football, basketball and track and field as a discus thrower. As a junior on the football team, Ojo was named first-team all-area by the Fort Worth Star-Telegram as an offensive tackle, despite his team compiling an overall record of 1–9 while going winless in conference play. He was also selected to the Polynesian Bowl and was named an Adidas All-American. As a senior, Ojo allowed no sacks and only four pressures, being selected All-American by MaxPreps, Rivals.com and Dave Campbell's Texas Football. He was also invited to the All-American Bowl and won the Anthony Muñoz Award as the best high school football lineman.

Ojo was ranked a five-star recruit and one of the top overall prospects in the 2026 recruiting class. In July 2025, he committed to play college football for the Texas Tech Red Raiders, receiving one of the largest name, image, and likeness (NIL) contracts in history, worth $5.1 million, a figure higher than many NFL salaries. Ojo became the highest-ranked Texas Tech recruit ever.
