= Josh Conerly Jr. =

American football player (born 2003)

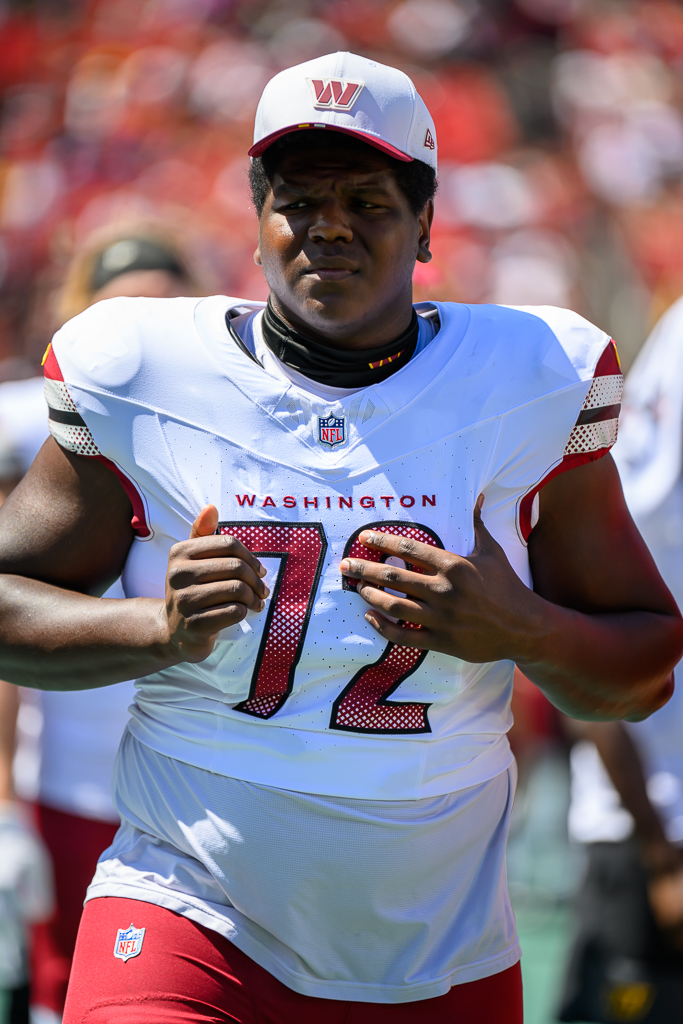
- Conerly with the Washington Commanders in 2025

No. 72 – Washington Commanders
- Position: Offensive tackle
- Roster status: Active

Personal information
- Born: November 5, 2003 (age 23)
- Listed height: 6 ft 4 in (1.93 m)
- Listed weight: 315 lb (143 kg)

Career information
- High school: Rainier Beach (Seattle, Washington)
- College: Oregon (2022–2024)
- NFL draft: 2025: 1st round, 29th overall pick

Career history
- Washington Commanders (2025–present)

Awards and highlights
- First-team All-American (2024); Anthony Muñoz Award (2021)

Career NFL statistics as of Week 1, 2026
- Games played: 18
- Games started: 18
- Fumble recoveries: 3
- Stats at Pro Football Reference

Joshua Conerly Jr. (born November 5, 2003) is an American professional football offensive tackle for the Washington Commanders of the National Football League (NFL). He played college football for the Oregon Ducks and was selected by the Commanders in the first round of the 2025 NFL draft.

== Early life ==
Conerly was born on November 5, 2003, and raised in the Seattle, Washington, area. He attended and played basketball and football at Rainier Beach High School in Seattle. Conerly played running back as a freshman and moved to the offensive line as a sophomore after a growth spurt. He received a number of honors as a senior in 2021, including the Anthony Muñoz Award and playing for the West team in the 2022 All-American Bowl. Conerly was ranked among the top-35 players of his college football recruiting class and committed to play for the Ducks at the University of Oregon.

== College career ==
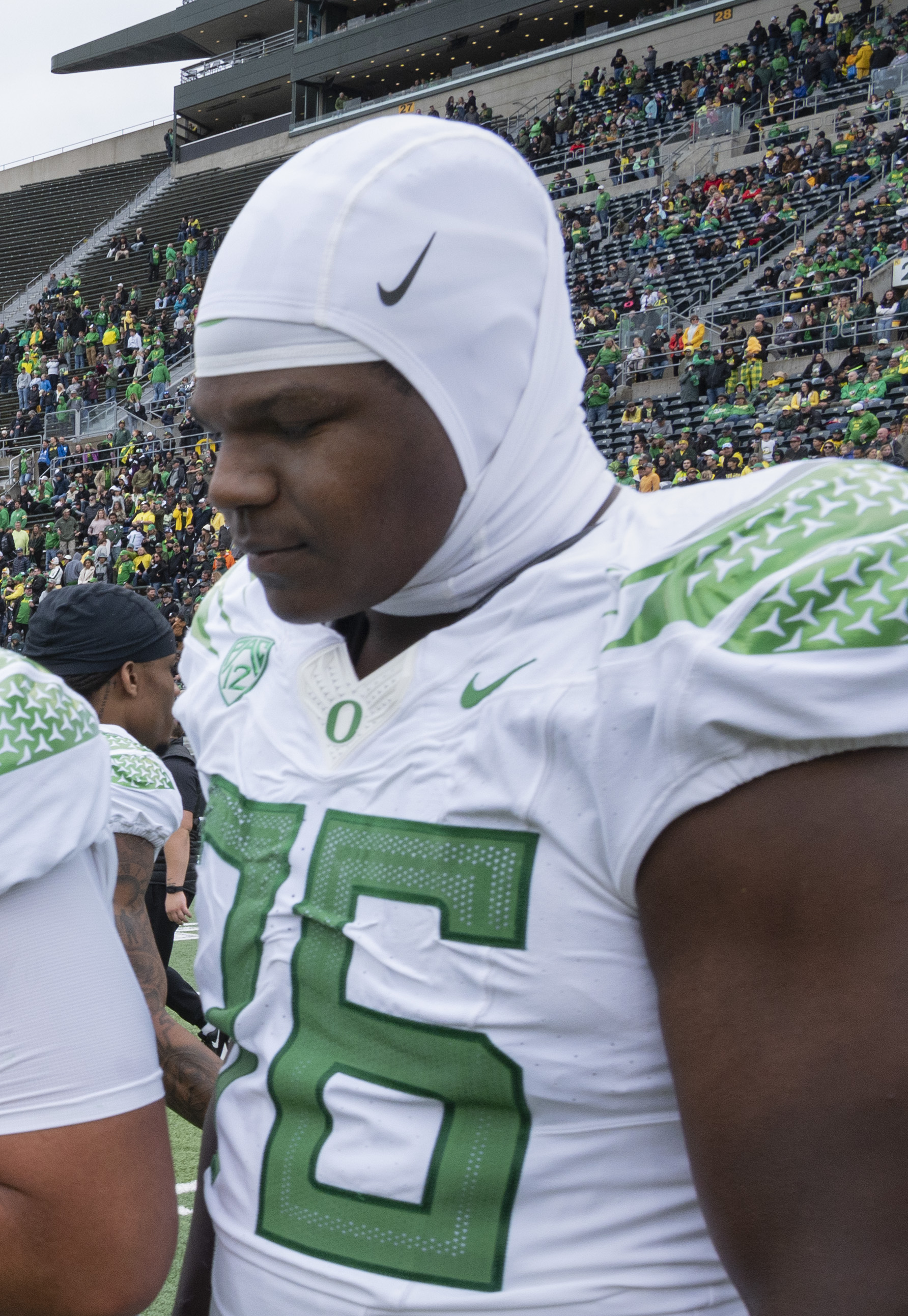
Conerly with the Oregon Ducks in 2024

As a freshman in 2022, Conerly played in every game as an extra blocker in short yardage situations and caught a touchdown pass on his birthday against the Colorado Buffaloes in week 9. He became the starting left tackle in 2023, earning honorable mention All-Pac-12 honors. Conerly earned first-team All-Big Ten honors and was named an All-American by The Athletic as a junior in 2024, declaring for the NFL draft following Oregon's appearance in the 2025 Rose Bowl.

== Professional career ==
Pre-draft measurables
Height	Weight	Arm length	Hand span	Wingspan	40-yard dash	10-yard split	20-yard split	Vertical jump	Broad jump	Bench press
6 ft 4 5/8 in (1.95 m)	311 lb (141 kg)	33 1/2 in (0.85 m)	10 3/8 in (0.26 m)	6 ft 10 1/4 in (2.09 m)	5.05 s	1.71 s	2.87 s	34.5 in (0.88 m)	8 ft 7 in (2.62 m)	24 reps
All values from NFL Combine/Pro Day

Conerly was selected by the Washington Commanders in the first round (29th overall) of the 2025 NFL draft. He signed his four-year rookie contract, worth $15.68 million fully guaranteed, on May 27, 2025. He started at right tackle in the season opener against the New York Giants.
