= Outlets of Des Moines =

- Location: Altoona, Iowa, United States
- Coordinates: 41.6564°N 93.5128°W
- Opened: August 2017
- Developer: New England Development
- Manager: New England Development
- Owner: New England Development
- Floor area: 300,000 square feet (28,000 m^{2})
- Floors: 1
- Parking: Surface parking
- Public transit: DART Route 17
- Website: www.outletsofdesmoines.com

Outlets of Des Moines is an open-air outlet shopping center located in Altoona, Iowa, United States. Situated at 801 Bass Pro Drive NW, near the intersection of Interstate 80 and U.S. Route 65, the mall opened in August 2017 and features over 60 stores and dining options. Developed and managed by New England Development, the center serves as a regional shopping destination in the Des Moines metropolitan area, offering discounts of up to 70% on brand-name products.

== History ==
The Outlets of Des Moines was developed as part of The Shoppes at Prairie Crossing, a 230-acre retail, residential, and commercial development in Altoona. The project aimed to establish Altoona as a premier shopping and entertainment destination in Central Iowa. Construction began after a period of economic recovery following the 2008 recession, with the mall opening to the public in August 2017. The $100 million, 300,000-square-foot center was designed to attract both local residents and visitors from beyond the Des Moines metro area.

Upon opening, the mall featured over 40 stores, with plans to expand to approximately 65 tenants. By 2023, the center housed 60 stores. The mall’s development has contributed significantly to Altoona’s economic growth, with taxable sales in the city increasing by 700% from 1998 to 2018, partly driven by the outlet center.

== Stores and Features ==
Outlets of Des Moines offers a mix of outlet stores from well-known brands, including Michael Kors, Nike Factory Store, Polo Ralph Lauren, Under Armour, Levi's Outlet Store, Vera Bradley, and American Eagle Outfitters. Other notable retailers include J.Crew Factory, Kate Spade New York, Tommy Hilfiger, Express Factory Outlet, and Eddie Bauer.

The open-air design includes amenities such as seating areas with fire pits and several dining options, including quick-serve restaurants. The mall is located near other attractions, such as Bass Pro Shops, Prairie Meadows Casino, and Adventureland amusement park, enhancing its appeal as a family-friendly destination.

== Economic Impact ==
The Outlets of Des Moines has played a significant role in transforming Altoona into a regional retail hub. A 2018 study by the Heart of America Group, using cellphone data, found that 45% of visitors came from Altoona, Des Moines, and nearby suburbs, while 17% traveled from outside Central Iowa. The mall serves a residential trade area of nearly one million people and has no major outlet center competitors within an 80-mile radius. In 2021, Altoona generated approximately $677 million in taxable sales, with the outlet mall contributing to the city’s retail momentum.

== Transportation and Accessibility ==
The mall is accessible via Interstate 80 and U.S. Route 65, with ample surface parking available. Public transit is provided by the Des Moines Area Regional Transit Authority (DART) Route 17, which connects the mall to downtown Des Moines. The center’s location, approximately six miles from downtown Des Moines, makes it a convenient shopping option for both local residents and visitors.
