= LJ McCray (defensive lineman) =

American football player (born 2005)

No. 11 – Florida Gators
- Position: Defensive end
- Class: Redshirt Sophomore

Personal information
- Born: October 18, 2005 (age 21)
- Listed height: 6 ft 4 in (1.93 m)
- Listed weight: 270 lb (122 kg)

Career information
- High school: Mainland (Daytona Beach, Florida)
- College: Florida (2024–present)

Awards and highlights
- Anthony Muñoz Award (2023)

Lawal "LJ" McCray (born October 18, 2005) is an American college football defensive lineman for the Florida Gators.

== Early life ==
McCray attended Mainland High School in Daytona Beach, Florida. He played as a defensive lineman and tight end on the varsity team but also as center for the basketball team. In his sophomore year, he racked up two sacks, two total tackles as a defensive lineman and three yards as a tight end.

In his junior year, McCray’s production increased drastically with 44 total tackles and three sacks. He also produced 159 yards and two touchdowns in receiving as a tight end.

In his senior year, his tackle production almost doubled with 77 tackles while his sack number quadrupled with 13.0 sacks and snagged his first and only interception of his high school career.

On October 21, 2023, McCray, a five-star recruit, committed to Florida over Georgia, Auburn, and Florida State.

College recruiting (2024)
Name	Hometown	School	Height	Weight	Commit date
L.J. McCray; DL	Daytona Beach, Florida	Mainland	6 ft 4 in (1.93 m)	279 lb (127 kg)	Oct 21, 2023
L.J. McCray; DL	Recruit ratings: Rivals: 247Sports: ESPN: (91)				
