= Ray Drew =

American gridiron football player (born 1992)

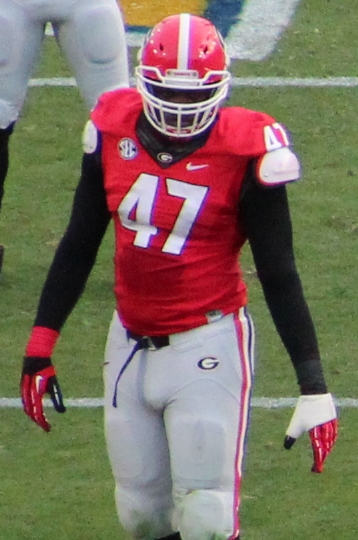
- Drew with the Georgia Bulldogs in 2013

Profile
- Position: Defensive tackle

Personal information
- Born: September 24, 1992 (age 34); Thomasville, Georgia, U.S.
- Listed height: 6 ft 4 in (1.93 m)
- Listed weight: 315 lb (143 kg)

Career information
- High school: Thomasville (GA) Thomas Co. Central
- College: Georgia
- NFL draft: 2015: undrafted

Career history
- Miami Dolphins (2015)*; Cleveland Browns (2015)*; Green Bay Packers (2016)*; Carolina Panthers (2016)*; Montreal Alouettes (2016–2020)
- * Offseason or practice squad member only
- Stats at Pro Football Reference
- Stats at CFL.ca

Ray Drew (born September 24, 1992) is an American former professional football defensive end. He played college football at Georgia. Drew was signed by the Miami Dolphins as an undrafted free agent in 2015. He was also a member of the Cleveland Browns, Green Bay Packers, and Carolina Panthers of the National Football League (NFL), and the Montreal Alouettes of the Canadian Football League (CFL).

== Early life ==
Drew attended Thomas County Central High School in Thomasville, Georgia. He was considered one of the best defensive line prospects in his class nicknamed the "Pastor Of Disaster". Drew also received a nomination to the 2010 U.S. Army All-American Bowl. Ray is an avid country music fan and spends his offseasons splitting time between Nashville, TN and Boston, GA.

== College career ==
After his freshman and sophomore seasons, Drew became an integral part of Georgia's defense as a junior.

== Professional career ==
Pre-draft measurables
Height	Weight	40-yard dash	10-yard split	20-yard split	20-yard shuttle	Three-cone drill	Vertical jump	Broad jump	Bench press
6 ft 4 in (1.93 m)	265 lb (120 kg)	4.83 s	1.71 s	2.75 s	4.45 s	7.43 s	32.5 in (0.83 m)	9 ft 4 in (2.84 m)	18 reps
All values are from Pro Day

=== Miami Dolphins ===
After going undrafted in the 2015 NFL draft, Drew signed with the Miami Dolphins on May 8, 2015. He was released by the Dolphins on August 30, 2015.

=== Cleveland Browns ===
On October 6, 2015, Drew was signed to the Cleveland Browns' practice squad. He was released by the Browns on November 2, 2015.

=== Green Bay Packers ===
Drew was signed by the Green Bay Packers on March 14, 2016. On April 25, 2016, he was released by the Packers.

=== Carolina Panthers ===
On August 13, 2016, Drew was signed by the Carolina Panthers. He was released by the Panthers on August 28, 2016.

=== Montreal Alouettes ===
Drew has signed with the Montreal Alouettes of the Canadian Football League. He is playing defensive end and is wearing #95.
