= Mainland High School =

Coordinates: 29.197375°N 81.05061944°W

Location
- 1255 W International Speedway Blvd, Daytona Beach, Florida 32114-3954; Daytona Beach, Florida; United States

Information
- Type: Public High School
- Motto: "Buc Pride Never Dies!"
- Established: 1872
- School district: Volusia County School District
- Principal: Melissa Fraine
- Staff: 92.00 (FTE)
- Grades: 9–12
- Enrollment: 1,925 (2023–2024)
- Student to teacher ratio: 20.92
- Colors: Blue and gold
- Mascot: Buccaneer
- Website: www.mainlandhighschool.org

Mainland High School is a public high school located in Daytona Beach, Florida, United States. It is attended by 1,979 students of grades nine through twelve. The mascot is a Buccaneer and strongly resembles the old logo of the Tampa Bay Buccaneers.

== History ==
=== Daytona Public School ===
The original Daytona Public School, located on Palmetto Avenue.

The original school was known as Daytona Public School, and was not a permanent structure. Originally started in 1872 as a school for all grades, the school started off in a log cabin, moved several times, and then finally settled in the wood-frame building pictured on the right in 1874. In 1910, the school was moved to a permanent building until 1925. It was during this time that the first sports program was started in 1912. This school served both junior and senior high school students. The mascot of the time was the Panther and the school colors were Silver and Blue.

=== Daytona High School ===
In 1926, the school was moved to a new campus on Third Avenue. It had an initial enrollment of 400 students, but quickly expanded to near capacity. It is at this time that the mascot was changed to the Buccaneer and the school colors were changed to Blue and Gold. In 1946 the name was changed to the current school name. This campus lasted until 1962.

=== Mainland High School ===
In 1962, the school was moved to the current property of the school at the intersection of International Speedway Boulevard and Clyde Morris Boulevard. Unlike the previous centralized designs, this school was spread out into a row of long buildings with open hallways. This design was used to increase natural air flow from the ocean, as the school did not have air conditioning until the 1980s. Some of the buildings were later expanded, and a few new buildings were added to accommodate for technology and demand for more classes. Portables were added behind the school to meet the demand for more classrooms. This layout was in use until 2010.

=== "New Mainland" ===
The "new" Mainland High School, as viewed in the courtyard. This school finished construction in 2006

The current physical plant, which now faces International Speedway Boulevard, was completed in 2006. As air conditioning was no longer a concern, the new design was more centralized, with the five main buildings centered around a large courtyard. The improvement was aided by a $6 million gift from notable alumnus and professional basketball player Vince Carter.

== Academies ==
Mainland, like many other schools in Volusia County, has several "academies." Academies are special programs of study that focus a student's education on a specific subject. Mainland has five academies: the Academy of Science and Medicine, the Academy of Communications and Multimedia Technology (ACMT), the Academy of Drafting and Manufacturing Technology (ADMT), the Sports Science Academy (SSA), and the Academy of Simulation and Robotics (ASR). These academies entitle graduating students to a special diploma upon completion of the program.

=== Academy of Science & Medicine ===
ASM is Mainland's largest academy. It is the science and medicine academy. Students are required to take two extra math courses, five extra science courses, along with a computer science course prior to graduation. Beginning with students that enter during the 2008–2009 School year, the name will gradually be phased to "ASM", or the Academy of Science and Medicine, with the engineering track being removed, and more emphasis being placed on the medical and environmental aspects of the scientific field.

=== Academy of Communications and Multimedia Technology ===
The Academy of Communications and Multimedia Technology focuses mainly on computer-related career subjects, such as digital design, network design and maintenance, web design, yearbook production, and television production.

=== Academy of Design and Manufacturing Technology ===
The Academy of Design and Manufacturing Technology focuses on preparing students for a career in the fields of technology development, architecture, engineering, manufacturing, computer aided manufacturing, electronics, interior design, and construction.

This academy uses technology such as: Autodesk AutoCAD and Inventor Pro and milling and CNC machines.

=== Sports Science Academy ===
The Sports Science Academy covers everything in sports besides the athletics. This includes First Aid and medical care, athletic training, and sports administration.

=== Academy of Simulation and Robotics ===
The Academy of Simulation and Robotics (ASR) debuted in the 2007-2008 school year. Students attracted to robotics, video game design and programming, and computer science can learn about these fields. Programming is taught using the Java programming language in computer science classes and Ruby in game programming classes.

== Sports and organizations ==
Mainland has several clubs and sports to choose from, which cover a wide variety of fields of interest.

=== Sports ===
Mainland currently has the following sports teams:

- Baseball
- Bowling
- Basketball
- Cross Country
- Flag Football
- Football
- Golf
- Soccer
- Softball
- Swimming
- Tennis
- Track & Field
- Volleyball
- Weightlifting
- Wrestling

== Awards ==
(see reference below)

- National Blue Ribbon School of Excellence: 1983, 1991, 1996
- Redbook Magazine's "Best Overall High School in Florida": 1992, 1996
- Florida's Governors Council Award for Model Physical Fitness Program: 1995
- Florida Five Star School, for outstanding business partnership and parent participation: 1995-1998
- Internet Science and Technology Fair National Winners: 1999-2003, 2006-2011

=== Grants ===
- U.S. Department of Education Technology Grant: 1997
- New Millennium High School Grant: 2001
- NCTM Edward G. Begle Grant: 2003-2005
- Enhancing Education Through Technology Grants: 2003-2005

== School Grades ==
- 1998-1999 C
- 1999-2000 C
- 2000-2001 C
- 2001-2002 C
- 2002-2003 C
- 2003-2004 C
- 2004-2005 C
- 2005-2006 C
- 2006-2007 D
- 2007-2008 C
- 2008-2009 D
- 2009-2010 D
- 2010-2011 B
- 2011-2012 A
- 2012-2013 B
- 2013-2014 A

== Notable alumni ==
- Ricardo Allen, American football player
- Terry Anthony, American football player
- Tony Bobbitt, pro basketball player for NBA Los Angeles Lakers and NBA D-League Colorado 14ers, class of 1999
- James Bonamy, singer and musician, class of 1990
- J. Hyatt Brown, former Florida legislator (1972–80), Former Speaker of the House (1978–80), CEO of Brown & Brown, Inc., class of 1955
- Ray Busse, former MLB player (shortstop) Houston Astros & St Louis Cardinals
- Vince Carter, retired All-Star NBA swingman, former University of North Carolina basketball player, 1998 Final Four appearance, member of 2000 Olympic Gold Medal Winning USA Basketball Team, class of 1995
- Phil Dalhausser, 2008 Olympic Gold Medal winner, #1 ranked Association of Volleyball Professionals men's beach volleyball player, class of 1998
- Buster Davis, NFL football player for the Arizona Cardinals and New England Patriots1st team All-American linebacker at Florida State University, class of 2002
- Tank Dell, American football player
- Diplo, DJ
- Mello Dotson, college football cornerback for the Kansas Jayhawks, class of 2020
- William T. Dzurilla, international attorney and law clerk to Justice Byron White of the United States Supreme Court, class of 1971
- Matt Every, PGA Professional & contestant on Golf Channel's Big Break reality show.
- Mark Gibson, ARCA racing driver, class of 1975
- Adrian Killins, American football player
- Maurice Lloyd, CFL football player for the Edmonton Eskimos, class of 2001
- George McCloud, former NBA player, class of 1985
- L.J. McCray, college football defensive end for the Florida Gators, class of 2024
- Tim Pickett, pro basketball player for NBA New Orleans Hornets and Italian LegADue Coopsette Rimini, class of 2000
- George Plimpton, writer, actor, class of 1944
- Jachai Polite, American football player
- Kitty Pryde, rapper, class of 2010
- Eddie Reese, head coach of U.S. Olympic men's swim team, University of Texas men's swim team; class of 1958.
- Paolo Rivera, Eisner award-winning comic book artist and painter, class of 1999
- Alexander Stubb, 13th president of Finland, 2024–, 43rd prime minister of Finland, 2014–15, Minister of Finance, 2015–16, class of 1986
- T. T. Toliver, pro football player for the Arena Football League, class of 1996
- Chase Tramont, politician
- Denzel Washington, Oscar-winning actor, writer, and director, class of 1971 (junior year only)
- T. K. Wetherell, former Florida legislator (1980–92), former President of Florida State University (2003–10), class of 1963
- Leonard Williams, American football player
- Antwuan Wyatt, American football player
- Dick Yelvington, American football player
