= Southeast Polk Community School District =

Public school district in Pleasant Hill, Iowa, United States

Address
- District Office 8031 NE University Ave. Pleasant Hill, IA 50327 Polk County Pleasant Hill, Iowa; United States
- Coordinates: 41.60°N 93.44°W

District information
- Type: Local school district
- Grades: PK-12
- Established: 1961
- Superintendent: Dirk Halupnik
- Schools: 11
- Budget: $108,354,000 (2020-21)
- NCES District ID: 1926820

Students and staff
- Students: 7,397 (2022-23)
- Teachers: 464.08 FTE
- Staff: 459.14 FTE
- Student–teacher ratio: 15.94
- Athletic conference: Central Iowa Metro League
- District mascot: Ram
- Colors: Black and Gold

Other information
- Website: SEP District Website; SEP Sports Website

Southeast Polk Community School District, (often shortened to SEP, SE Polk) is a public school district located in suburban Des Moines and rural Polk County, Iowa, including the towns of Altoona, Mitchellville, Pleasant Hill, Runnells, and the surrounding rural areas. The district also stretches into small portions of Jasper and Marion Counties.

The district was formed by a consolidation of several districts (most notably Runnells, Altoona, and Mitchellville; several smaller districts also merged) in 1962.

The district is overseen by a seven-member Board of Education.

The superintendent of schools is Dirk Halupnik.

== Schools ==
Southeast Polk operates 11 schools.

Preschool

- Little Rams Preschool

Elementary schools:

- Altoona Elementary, Altoona
- Centennial Elementary, Altoona
- Clay Elementary, Altoona
- Delaware Elementary, Des Moines
- Four Mile Elementary, Pleasant Hill
- Mitchellville Elementary, Mitchellville
- Runnells Elementary. Runnells
- Willowbrook Elementary, Altoona

Secondary Schools

- Southeast Polk Middle (Grade 6-7), Altoona
- Southeast Polk Junior High (Grade 8-9), Pleasant Hill
- Southeast Polk High School (Grade 10-12), Pleasant Hill

Southeast Polk is the 13th-largest school district in Iowa.

== Mascot ==
The school mascot is the Ram. RAMS is an acronym for Runnells, Altoona, and Mitchellville. The district modified the "s" to represent the word "schools," but the original intent was for the mascot to represent the entire area covered by the school district. The school colors are black and gold. The district prides itself on its large amount of school spirit, including both "Ram Pride" and "The Southeast Polk Way."

== Southeast Polk High School ==
=== Athletics ===
Southeast Polk is a member of the Central Iowa Metro League. The league is divided into two conferences, the Metro Conference and the Central Iowa Conference, with the latter being further subdivided into Northern, Eastern, and Western Divisions.

State Championships
Sport	Year(s)
Football	2021, 2022, 2023, 2024
Baseball	2014, 2015
Basketball (girls)	1977, 2013
Bowling (boys)	2018
Cross country (girls)	2018
Wheelchair Track and Field (boys)	2017
Wrestling Traditional Tournament Team	2013, 2015, 2016, 2017, 2022,2025
Wresting Dual Team	2013, 2015, 2017, 2019, 2020

== Notable alumni ==
- Sarah Darling, country music singer.
- Zach Nunn, Member of the U.S. House of Representatives from Iowa's 3rd district
- Xavier Nwankpa, safety for the Iowa Hawkeyes
- Kyle Orton, former NFL quarterback.
- Chris Pirillo, founder and former CEO of LockerGnome, Inc.
- Kadyn Proctor, offensive lineman for the Miami Dolphins
- Abu Sama, Running Back for Wisconsin.

== See also ==
- List of school districts in Iowa
- List of high schools in Iowa
