= Clay Township, Polk County, Iowa =

Township in Polk County, Iowa, U.S.

Coordinates: 41.6445°N 93.4645°W

Clay Township is a township in Polk County, Iowa, United States.

== History ==
Clay Township was established in 1878.
