= Pleasant Hill, Iowa =

- City
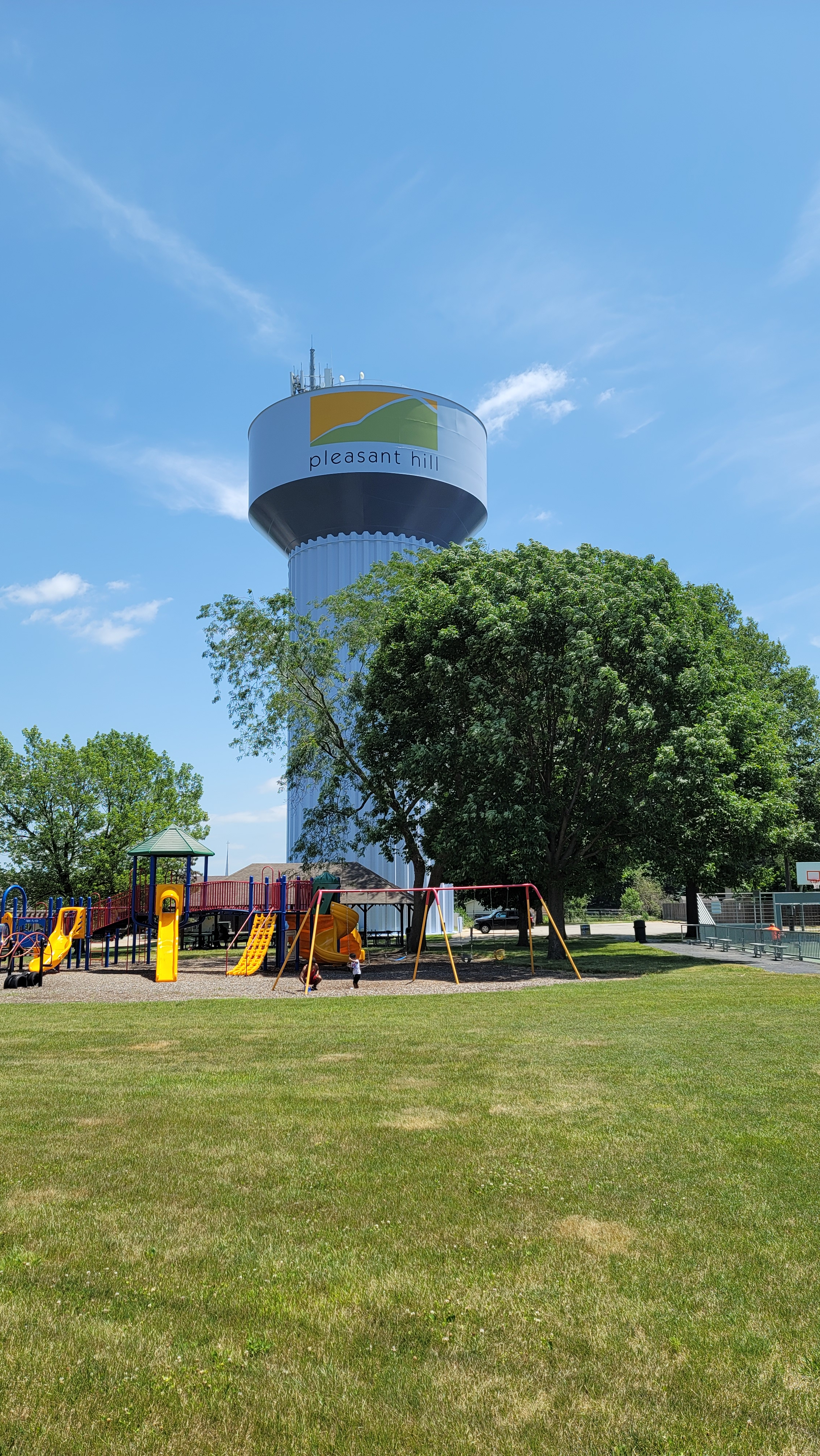
- Pleasant Hill's water tower, with the city logo

- Logo

- Location of Pleasant Hill, Iowa
- Coordinates: 41°34′33″N 93°29′53″W
- Country: United States
- State: Iowa
- County: Polk
- Townships: Four Mile, Clay, Delaware, Camp, Lee
- Incorporated: May 12, 1956

Area
  - Total: 10.87 sq mi (28.15 km^{2})
  - Land: 10.42 sq mi (26.99 km^{2})
  - Water: 0.44 sq mi (1.15 km^{2})
- Elevation: 906 ft (276 m)

Population (2020)
  - Total: 10,147
  - Density: 974/sq mi (375.9/km^{2})
- Time zone: UTC-6 (Central (CST))
  - Summer (DST): UTC-5 (CDT)
- ZIP codes: 50317, 50327
- Area code: 515
- FIPS code: 19-63525
- GNIS feature ID: 2396230
- Website: www.pleasanthilliowa.org

Pleasant Hill is a city in Polk County, Iowa, United States. The population was 10,147 at the time of the 2020 census. It is part of the Des Moines metropolitan area. As of July 2005, Pleasant Hill was assigned a ZIP code, 50327.

== History ==
Pleasant Hill incorporated as a city on May 12, 1956.

=== 1983 explosion ===
On November 20, 1983, an explosion of an explosives storage bunker just south of Pleasant Hill occurred. Reports were that two teenagers were hunting around the area. One of the teenagers may have shot a bullet from a hill which penetrated the bunker ceiling, which was deemed the probable cause of the explosion. The two teenagers were killed in the explosion, leaving only small pieces of shirts. The explosion was felt 45 miles away from the site. At least 25 homes within a one-mile radius of the explosion suffered damage, doors and windows were blown out, ceilings fell and houses were knocked off their foundations, police said. One house, 300 yards directly up the valley from the shack, suffered an inch-wide crack the entire width of its basement wall.

== Geography ==
According to the United States Census Bureau, the city has a total area of 9.29 square miles (24.06 km^{2}), of which 9.15 square miles (23.70 km^{2}) is land and 0.14 square miles (0.36 km^{2}) is water.

== Demographics ==
Historical populations
Year	Pop.	±%
1960	397	—
1970	1,535	+286.6%
1980	3,493	+127.6%
1990	3,671	+5.1%
2000	5,070	+38.1%
2010	8,785	+73.3%
2020	10,147	+15.5%
Source:"U.S. Census website". United States Census Bureau. and Iowa Data Center; Source: U.S. Decennial Census

=== 2020 census ===
As of the 2020 census, Pleasant Hill had 10,147 people, 3,987 households, and 2,822 families residing in the city. The population density was 973.6 inhabitants per square mile (375.9/km^{2}). There were 4,155 housing units at an average density of 398.7 per square mile (153.9/km^{2}).

The median age was 39.6 years. 24.4% of residents were under the age of 18 and 18.0% were 65 years of age or older. For every 100 females there were 92.3 males, and for every 100 females age 18 and over there were 89.8 males age 18 and over. The gender makeup of the city was 48.0% male and 52.0% female.

94.7% of residents lived in urban areas, while 5.3% lived in rural areas.

Of the 3,987 households, 33.7% had children under the age of 18 living in them. Of all households, 55.2% were married-couple households, 6.6% were cohabitating-couple households, 14.1% were households with a male householder and no spouse or partner present, and 24.1% were households with a female householder and no spouse or partner present. About 29.2% of households were non-families, 23.6% were made up of individuals, and 11.0% had someone living alone who was 65 years of age or older.

Of the 4,155 housing units, 4.0% were vacant. The homeowner vacancy rate was 1.6% and the rental vacancy rate was 6.1%.

Racial composition as of the 2020 census
Race	Number	Percent
White	8,574	84.5%
Black or African American	359	3.5%
American Indian and Alaska Native	38	0.4%
Asian	292	2.9%
Native Hawaiian and Other Pacific Islander	7	0.1%
Some other race	221	2.2%
Two or more races	656	6.5%
Hispanic or Latino (of any race)	646	6.4%

=== 2010 census ===
As of the census of 2010, there were 8,785 people, 3,395 households, and 2,426 families residing in the city. The population density was 960.1 inhabitants per square mile (370.7/km^{2}). There were 3,587 housing units at an average density of 392.0 per square mile (151.4/km^{2}). The racial makeup of the city was 91.0% White, 2.7% African American, 0.3% Native American, 2.5% Asian, 0.9% from other races, and 2.6% from two or more races. Hispanic or Latino of any race were 4.5% of the population.

There were 3,395 households, of which 38.1% had children under the age of 18 living with them, 56.3% were married couples living together, 11.1% had a female householder with no husband present, 4.1% had a male householder with no wife present, and 28.5% were non-families. 22.7% of all households were made up of individuals, and 8.1% had someone living alone who was 65 years of age or older. The average household size was 2.57 and the average family size was 3.02.

The median age in the city was 35.1 years. 27.4% of residents were under the age of 18; 7.6% were between the ages of 18 and 24; 29.3% were from 25 to 44; 24.4% were from 45 to 64; and 11.3% were 65 years of age or older. The gender makeup of the city was 46.8% male and 53.2% female.

=== 2000 census ===
As of the census of 2000, there were 5,070 people, 1,900 households, and 1,451 families residing in the city. The population density was 647.1 inhabitants per square mile (249.8/km^{2}). There were 1,966 housing units at an average density of 250.9 per square mile (96.9/km^{2}). The racial makeup of the city was 95.03% White, 0.79% African American, 0.28% Native American, 1.74% Asian, 0.24% Pacific Islander, 1.12% from other races, and 0.81% from two or more races. Hispanic or Latino of any race were 2.43% of the population.

There were 1,900 households, out of which 35.5% had children under the age of 18 living with them, 65.4% were married couples living together, 8.3% had a female householder with no husband present, and 23.6% were non-families. 18.4% of all households were made up of individuals, and 5.3% had someone living alone who was 65 years of age or older. The average household size was 2.63 and the average family size was 2.99.

Age spread: 25.9% under the age of 18, 7.4% from 18 to 24, 31.7% from 25 to 44, 25.5% from 45 to 64, and 9.6% who were 65 years of age or older. The median age was 36 years. For every 100 females, there were 92.0 males. For every 100 females age 18 and over, there were 86.9 males.

The median income for a household in the city was $60,694, and the median income for a family was $68,889. Males had a median income of $42,450 versus $29,697 for females. The per capita income for the city was $25,316. About 0.6% of families and 1.3% of the population were below the poverty line, including none of those under age 18 and 4.7% of those age 65 or over.

== Education ==
Most of Pleasant Hill is part of the Des Moines Public School District, while newer portions of the city are in the Southeast Polk Community School District. The Des Moines district's Pleasant Hill Elementary School and Southeast Polk's Four Mile Elementary School and Southeast Polk Junior and Senior High Schools are located in Pleasant Hill.

== Transportation ==
Transit service in the city is provided by Des Moines Area Regional Transit. Route 10 provides bus service connecting the city to the region.
