= Delaware Township, Polk County, Iowa =

Township in Polk County, Iowa, U.S.

Coordinates: 41.65°N 93.52°W

Delaware Township is a township in Polk County, Iowa, United States.

== History ==
Delaware Township was organized in 1850. It was named after Delaware, Delaware County, Ohio, the former home of an early settler.
