= Troy Mangen =

American football player (born 1994)

Profile
- Position: Tight end

Personal information
- Born: July 25, 1994 (age 32); Union, Ohio, U.S.
- Listed height: 6 ft 6 in (1.98 m)
- Listed weight: 256 lb (116 kg)

Career information
- High school: Northmont (Clayton, Ohio)
- College: Ohio (2013–2017)
- NFL draft: 2018: undrafted

Career history
- Atlanta Falcons (2018)*
- * Offseason or practice squad member only

Troy Mangen (born July 25, 1994) is an American former professional football tight end. He played college football for the Ohio Bobcats. Mangen started all four years at Ohio as a tight end. He finished his senior year with 13 catches for 139 yards and had two touchdowns. He signed with the Falcons as an undrafted free agent in 2018.

== Professional career ==
Mangen signed with the Atlanta Falcons as an undrafted free agent on May 1, 2018. He was waived on September 1, 2018.
