= Englewood, Ohio =

- City
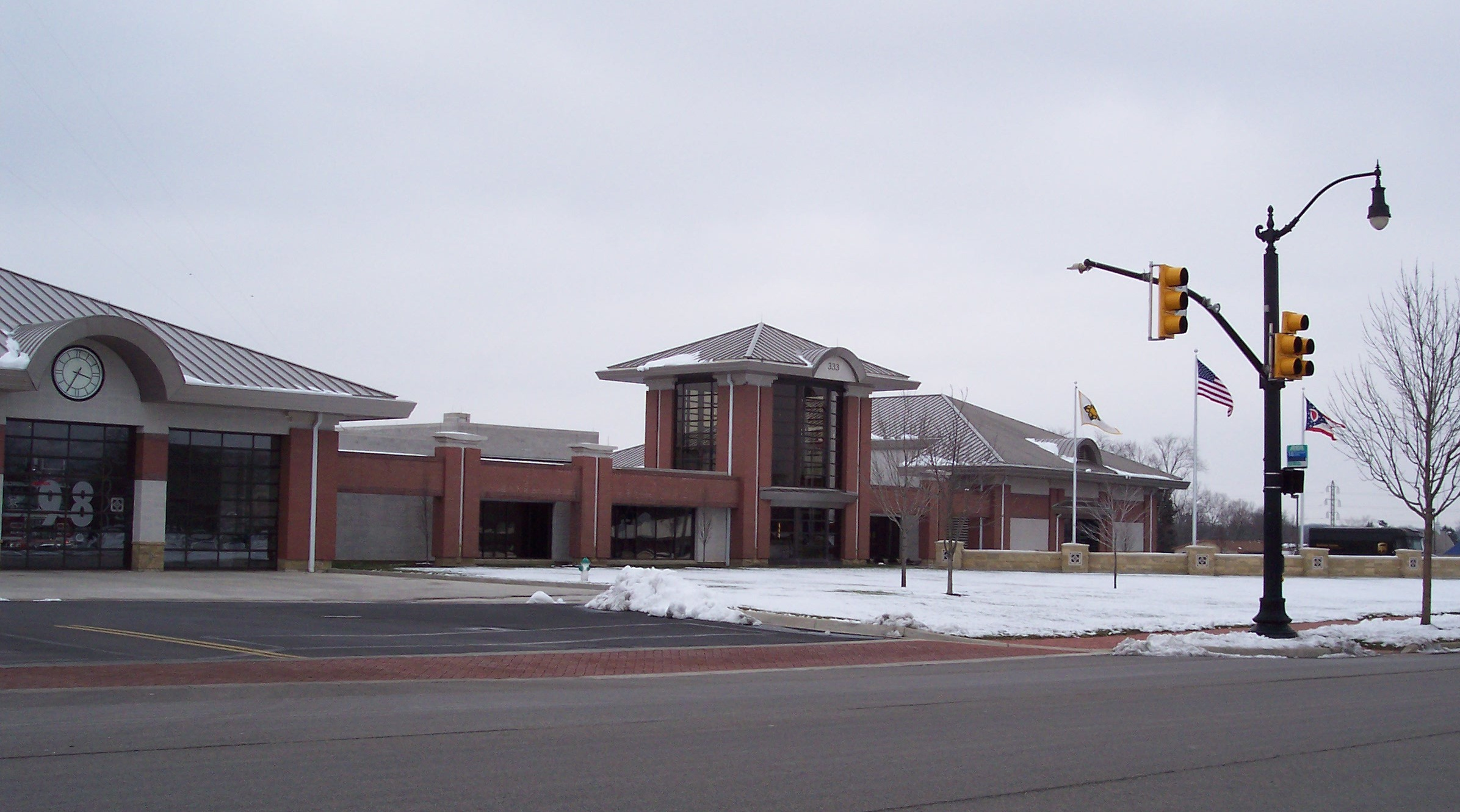
- City Hall

- Flag Seal
- Interactive map of Englewood, Ohio
- Location within Ohio Location within the United States
- Coordinates: 39°52′20″N 84°18′32″W
- Country: United States
- State: Ohio
- County: Montgomery
- Founded: May 6, 1841 (as Harrisburg)
- Named: "Iamton" February 8, 1870 "Englewood" July 11, 1899
- Incorporated: May 15, 1914

Government
  - Type: Council-Mayor
  - Mayor: Cathy McGrail (R) (Elected in 2023)

Area
  - Total: 6.60 sq mi (17.10 km^{2})
  - Land: 6.56 sq mi (16.99 km^{2})
  - Water: 0.042 sq mi (0.11 km^{2})
- Elevation: 958 ft (292 m)

Population (2020)
  - Total: 13,463
  - Estimate (2023): 13,249
  - Density: 2,052.2/sq mi (792.36/km^{2})
- Time zone: UTC-5 (EST)
  - Summer (DST): UTC-4 (EDT)
- ZIP codes: 45315, 45322
- Area codes: 937, 326
- FIPS code: 39-25396
- GNIS feature ID: 2394692
- Website: www.englewood.oh.us

Englewood is a city in Montgomery County, Ohio, United States. The population was 13,463 at the 2020 census. A northern suburb of Dayton, it is part of the Dayton metropolitan area.

== History ==
Although Englewood was not actually founded until 1841, many early settlers began to come to the area known as Randolph Township around 1800. Earliest settlers were the families of David Hoover, David Mast, Daniel Hoover, Robert Ewing, John and Abraham McClintock, John Rench, Martin Sheets, Jacob Smith, Daniel and Peter Fetters. Also among the early settlers were the families of the Ellers, Fouts, Frantzs, Wertzs and the Brumbaughs.

The early settlers made their living basically from agriculture. They shipped grain and bacon down the Stillwater River on flat bottom boats to Dayton and as far south as New Orleans. There was also a considerable amount of industry, including saw mills, gun smithing, wine distilling and pottery manufacturing.

There were many Native Americans in the area in the early days that traded with the settlers. There was also an abundance of wildlife which afforded good hunting for the settlers’ food requirements.

Following primarily the path traced through this area by the Stillwater River, a group of settlers founded what is now the City of Englewood on May 6, 1841. These pioneers included Mathias Gish, Daniel Rasor and Samuel Herr. Some of these settlers came from the area around Harrisburg, Pennsylvania, and thus named the community Harrisburg. Other residents came from Randolph County, North Carolina, and named this township accordingly.

Harrisburg's first post office was opened on February 8, 1870, and discontinued on February 6, 1871. The post office was re-established on May 8, 1874, and the first postmaster was Harvey Iams. The town was then renamed Iamton. However, at that time the capital letters I and J were the same in the alphabet and the town became known as Jamton.

In 1898, the local businessmen conducted a contest to choose a new name for the town. The name Englewood was chosen as the winner of that contest and the town of Jamton was renamed Englewood. The Village of Englewood was incorporated on May 15, 1914, and Jacob Hoover was the first mayor. The population had risen to 415 by 1930 and over 600 by 1940. Englewood became a city in 1971.

Natural gas was made available to the area in 1934, the first water works was built in 1936 and the original sewer system was completed in 1940.

== Geography ==
The city is situated along the Stillwater River, bordering the cities of Clayton, Union, and Butler Township. Interstate 70 and the National Road (U.S. Route 40) intersect Ohio State Route 48 within Englewood's boundaries.

According to the United States Census Bureau, the city has a total area of 6.59 square miles (17.07 km^{2}), of which 6.55 square miles (16.96 km^{2}) is land and 0.04 square miles (0.10 km^{2}) is water.

== Demographics ==
Historical population
Census	Pop.	Note	%±
1920	351		—
1930	415		18.2%
1940	531		28.0%
1950	678		27.7%
1960	1,515		123.5%
1970	7,885		420.5%
1980	11,329		43.7%
1990	11,432		0.9%
2000	12,235		7.0%
2010	13,465		10.1%
2020	13,463		0.0%
2023 (est.)	13,249		−1.6%

=== 2020 census ===
As of the 2020 census, Englewood had a population of 13,463. The median age was 44.9 years. 20.5% of residents were under the age of 18 and 24.0% of residents were 65 years of age or older. For every 100 females there were 87.1 males, and for every 100 females age 18 and over there were 81.5 males age 18 and over.

99.6% of residents lived in urban areas, while 0.4% lived in rural areas.

There were 5,686 households in Englewood, of which 27.4% had children under the age of 18 living in them. Of all households, 45.0% were married-couple households, 16.6% were households with a male householder and no spouse or partner present, and 32.7% were households with a female householder and no spouse or partner present. About 31.8% of all households were made up of individuals and 16.8% had someone living alone who was 65 years of age or older.

There were 5,963 housing units, of which 4.6% were vacant. The homeowner vacancy rate was 1.0% and the rental vacancy rate was 7.2%.

Racial composition as of the 2020 census
Race	Number	Percent
White	9,973	74.1%
Black or African American	2,356	17.5%
American Indian and Alaska Native	17	0.1%
Asian	254	1.9%
Native Hawaiian and Other Pacific Islander	1	0.0%
Some other race	126	0.9%
Two or more races	736	5.5%
Hispanic or Latino (of any race)	230	1.7%

=== 2010 census ===
As of the census of 2010, there were 13,465 people, 5,555 households, and 3,687 families living in the city. The population density was 2,055.7 inhabitants per square mile (793.7/km^{2}). There were 5,898 housing units at an average density of 900.5 per square mile (347.7/km^{2}). The racial makeup of the city was 82.3% White, 12.9% African American, 0.2% Native American, 1.6% Asian, 0.1% Pacific Islander, 0.6% from other races, and 2.3% from two or more races. Hispanic or Latino of any race were 1.1% of the population.

There were 5,555 households, of which 31.0% had children under the age of 18 living with them, 50.6% were married couples living together, 12.0% had a female householder with no husband present, 3.8% had a male householder with no wife present, and 33.6% were non-families. 29.4% of all households were made up of individuals, and 12.6% had someone living alone who was 65 years of age or older. The average household size was 2.37 and the average family size was 2.93.

The median age in the city was 42.1 years. 23% of residents were under the age of 18; 6.9% were between the ages of 18 and 24; 23.7% were from 25 to 44; 27.1% were from 45 to 64; and 19.2% were 65 years of age or older. The gender makeup of the city was 46.6% male and 53.4% female.

=== 2000 census ===
As of the census of 2000, there were 12,235 people, 5,062 households, and 3,442 families living in the city. The population density was 1,865.1 inhabitants per square mile (720.1/km^{2}). There were 5,310 housing units at an average density of 809.4 per square mile (312.5/km^{2}). The racial makeup of the city was 92.51% White, 4.61% African American, 0.21% Native American, 1.30% Asian, 0.02% Pacific Islander, 0.38% from other races, and 0.98% from two or more races. Hispanic or Latino of any race were 0.87% of the population.

There were 5,062 households, out of which 31.0% had children under the age of 18 living with them, 55.0% were married couples living together, 9.6% had a female householder with no husband present, and 32.0% were non-families. 27.7% of all households were made up of individuals, and 11.9% had someone living alone who was 65 years of age or older. The average household size was 2.38 and the average family size was 2.91.

In the city the population was spread out, with 24.1% under the age of 18, 7.0% from 18 to 24, 27.6% from 25 to 44, 24.8% from 45 to 64, and 16.5% who were 65 years of age or older. The median age was 39 years. For every 100 females, there were 89.3 males. For every 100 females age 18 and over, there were 86.0 males.

The median income for a household in the city was $46,920, and the median income for a family was $60,978. Males had a median income of $41,312 versus $31,647 for females. The per capita income for the city was $22,792. About 2.3% of families and 5.1% of the population were below the poverty line, including 5.9% of those under age 18 and 5.2% of those age 65 or over.

== Government ==
The City of Englewood is a Mayor-Council type government. The current City Council of Englewood is made up of 6 part-time members.

== Education ==
Englewood is served by the Northmont City School District of Montgomery County, Ohio. The schools include:

- Northmont High School
- Northmont Middle School
- Englewood Hills Elementary
- Northmoor Elementary
- Northwood Elementary
- Union Elementary
- Kleptz Early Learning Center

Englewood has a public library, a branch of the Dayton Metro Library.
