= Dave Bancroft =

American baseball player and manager (1891-1972)

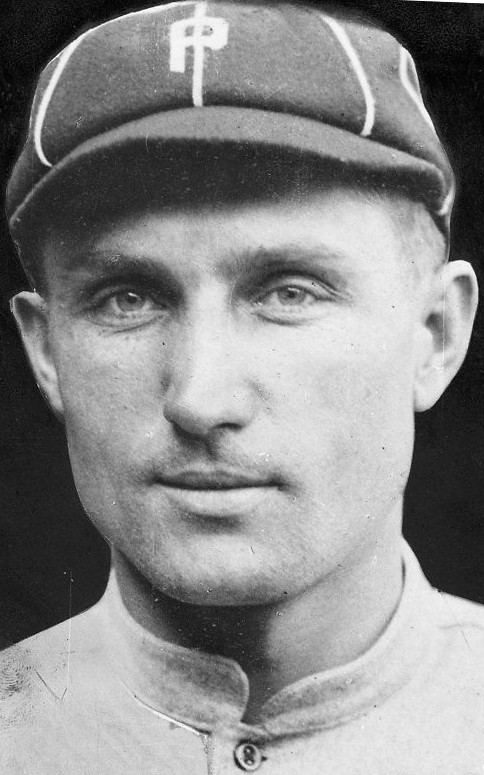
- Bancroft with the Philadelphia Phillies in 1915
- Shortstop / Manager
- Born: April 20, 1891; Sioux City, Iowa, U.S.
- Died: October 9, 1972 (aged 81); Superior, Wisconsin, U.S.
- Batted: Switch Threw: Right

MLB debut
- April 14, 1915, for the Philadelphia Phillies

Last MLB appearance
- May 31, 1930, for the New York Giants

MLB statistics
- Batting average: .279
- Hits: 2,004
- Home runs: 32
- Runs batted in: 591
- Managerial record: 249–363
- Winning %: .406
- Stats at Baseball Reference
- Managerial record at Baseball Reference

Teams
- As player: Philadelphia Phillies (1915–1920); New York Giants (1920–1923); Boston Braves (1924–1927); Brooklyn Robins (1928–1929); New York Giants (1930); As manager: Boston Braves (1924–1927)

Career highlights and awards
- 2× World Series champion (1921, 1922)

Member of the National

Baseball Hall of Fame
- Induction: 1971
- Election method: Veterans Committee

David James Bancroft (April 20, 1891 – October 9, 1972) was an American professional baseball player and manager. A shortstop, he played in Major League Baseball (MLB) for the Philadelphia Phillies, New York Giants, Boston Braves and the Brooklyn Robins between 1915 and 1930.

Born in Sioux City, Iowa, Bancroft played in minor league baseball from 1909 through 1914, at which point he was bought by the Phillies. The Giants traded for Bancroft during the 1920 season. After playing for the Giants through the 1923 season, he became player-manager of the Braves, serving in that role for four years. After he was fired by the Braves, Bancroft played two seasons for the Robins and ended his playing career with the Giants the next season. He coached with the Giants, then managed in the minor leagues and the All-American Girls Professional Baseball League.

Bancroft was part of the Giants' World Series championship teams in 1921 and 1922. He was also a part of the National League pennant-winning teams of 1915 and 1923. Considered an excellent defensive shortstop and a smart ball player, Bancroft was elected to the Baseball Hall of Fame by the Veterans Committee in 1971. His election was not without controversy as the Committee included former teammates of Bancroft, resulting in charges of cronyism.

== Early life ==
Bancroft was born on April 20, 1891, in Sioux City, Iowa, the youngest of three children of Ella (née Gearhart) and Frank Bancroft. Frank worked as a news vendor on the Milwaukee Railroad. Bancroft attended Hopkins Grade School and Sioux City High School.

== Career ==
=== Early career ===
In the summer after his junior year of high school, at the age of 18, Bancroft began his professional career in 1909 with the Duluth White Sox of the Class-D Minnesota–Wisconsin League. Bancroft did not have immediate success, registering a .210 batting average and .917 fielding percentage in 111 games, but he developed a positive reputation in the league. The Superior Blues acquired Bancroft at midseason, and he remained there through the 1911 season. Bancroft finished the 1911 season with a .273 batting average and 41 stolen bases, and the Blues won the league championship.

The Portland Beavers of the Class-AA Pacific Coast League (PCL) drafted Bancroft from Superior for the 1912 season. He struggled in 1912, batting .207, and was demoted to the Portland Colts of the Class-B Northwestern League in 1913. After batting .244 for the Colts, he was promoted back to the Beavers in 1914, where he batted .271 and drew comparisons to former Beavers star shortstop Roger Peckinpaugh as the team won the PCL championship. While with the Beavers, Bancroft earned the nickname "Beauty", for his habit of referring to pitches as "beauties" while he batted.

=== Major League Baseball ===
==== Philadelphia Phillies ====
Before the 1915 season, the Philadelphia Phillies purchased Bancroft from Portland for $5,000 ($155,411 in current dollar terms). Portland's manager was quoted as saying he did not expect Bancroft would last with the Phillies. In his rookie season, Bancroft finished second in the National League (NL) to teammate Gavvy Cravath in walks (77), third in runs scored (85), and tied Fred Luderus for sixth in home runs (7). For his ability to hit with power from both sides of the plate, The Pittsburgh Press declared he was developing into "a second Honus Wagner". The Phillies won their first NL pennant in 1915, but lost the 1915 World Series to the Boston Red Sox. Bancroft's offense contributed to the Phillies' victory in Game 1, as he had an infield hit leading to the Phillies' winning run. Though the Phillies batted .182 as a team in the series, Bancroft batted .294.

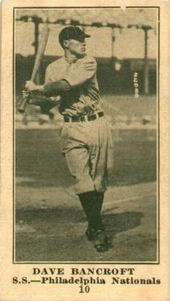
Bancroft's 1916 baseball card

Bancroft batted third in the Phillies' lineup in 1916. However, he slumped to a .212 batting average that season, the lowest of his career. Despite his offensive struggles, he gained recognition for his fielding skills, and an injury to Bancroft late in the season contributed to the Phillies' poor play late in the season.

Bancroft feuded with Cravath, who became the Phillies' manager in 1919. Before the 1919 season, Bancroft requested a trade to the Cincinnati Reds, but the trade request was not granted. John McGraw, manager of the New York Giants, coveted Bancroft due to his intelligent and hard-nosed style of playing. Upon McGraw's urging, the Giants traded Art Fletcher, Bill Hubbell and $100,000 ($1,569,601 in current dollar terms) to the Phillies for Bancroft on June 7, 1920.

==== New York Giants ====
With the Giants, Bancroft was an able performer. His 102 runs scored during the 1920 season were second only to new Giants teammate George Burns. On June 1, 1921, in a game the Giants won against the Phillies, Bancroft hit for the cycle. His 153 games played in the 1921 season tied for second in the NL with several others, behind only Rogers Hornsby. He also tied teammate Frankie Frisch for second with 121 runs scored, behind only Hornsby, while his 193 hits were eighth-best and his .389 on-base percentage was ninth-best in the NL. However, he only batted .152 in the 1921 World Series, which the Giants won over the New York Yankees in eight games.

Bancroft played in all 156 games in the 1922 season. He tied Jack Smith for third with 117 runs scored, finished third with 209 hits, and tied Bob O'Farrell for second with 79 walks. His .321 batting average was his career-high. He set an MLB record for the most fielding chances by a shortstop in a season (984). Though the Giants swept the 1922 World Series from the Yankees in four games, he again had a poor World Series, batting .211.

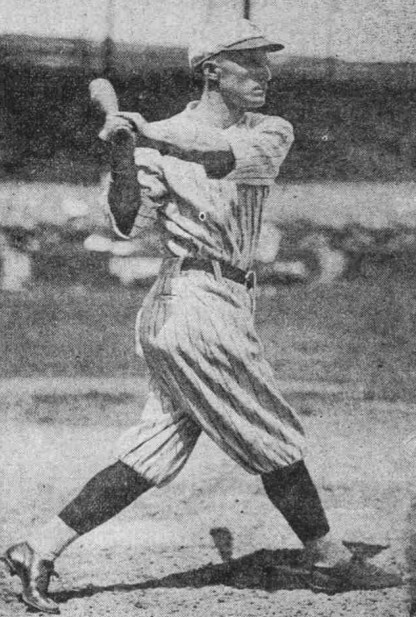
Bancroft in 1920

Serving as team captain, Bancroft began to suffer through leg injuries in 1923. He was also hospitalized with a case of pneumonia during the season. Bancroft returned by the postseason, but batted .091 in the 1923 World Series, which the Yankees won in six games.

==== Boston Braves ====
With a young Travis Jackson ready to succeed Bancroft as the Giants' shortstop, and with Bancroft desiring an opportunity to manage, McGraw traded Bancroft to the Boston Braves with Bill Cunningham and Casey Stengel for Joe Oeschger and Billy Southworth after the 1923 season. McGraw was also looking to aid his former star Christy Mathewson, who was then the general manager of the Braves.

Bancroft served as player–manager for the Braves for three seasons, from 1924 through 1927. Upon becoming manager, he became the youngest manager in the National League (NL). He missed time during the 1924 season with appendicitis. After finishing in last place in the eight-team NL, Bancroft overhauled the Braves' roster for the 1925 season. However, he lost the services of Rube Marquard and Joe Genewich, and the Braves finished in fifth place. Bancroft suggested that Bob Smith, ineffective as an infielder, become a pitcher; Smith's successes as a pitcher benefited the Braves' starting rotation. The Braves lacked offense going into the 1926 season, but hoped their pitching and defense could lead them into contention. The Braves finished in seventh place in the NL in 1926 and 1927.

==== Brooklyn Robins and return to the Giants ====
Failing to turn the Braves into a winning team, Bancroft requested his release from the team after the 1927 season. He signed with the Brooklyn Robins the same day. Stating that he was happy to no longer have the stress of managing, he played for the Robins for the 1928 and 1929 seasons. During his time with the Robins, he was seen as a possible successor to manager Wilbert Robinson.

The Robins released Bancroft after the 1929 season, and he returned to the Giants as assistant manager and coach, serving under McGraw. He ended his MLB playing career in 1930. He remained as a coach, filling in for McGraw when he was too ill to manage. During the 1930 offseason, he led a team of MLB players on an exhibition trip to Cuba. When McGraw retired in 1932, the Giants appointed Bill Terry as player-manager. Surprised and disappointed that Terry was chosen over him, Bancroft left the Giants.

=== Later career ===
After retiring as a player, Bancroft managed in minor league baseball. He managed the Minneapolis Millers of the Class-AA American Association in 1933. Though the Millers reached the championship series, he was not retained for the 1934 season, as the Millers sought a player-manager to help the team reduce costs.

After the season, Bancroft interviewed for the managerial job with the Cincinnati Reds; however, the Reds hired O'Farrell. Bancroft next managed the Sioux City Cowboys of the Class-A Western League in 1936. He appeared in one game for Sioux City as a player. Bancroft then managed the St. Cloud Rox of the Class-C Northern League in 1947. In the All-American Girls Professional Baseball League, Bancroft managed the Chicago Colleens in 1948 and South Bend Blue Sox in 1949 and 1950.

== Legacy ==
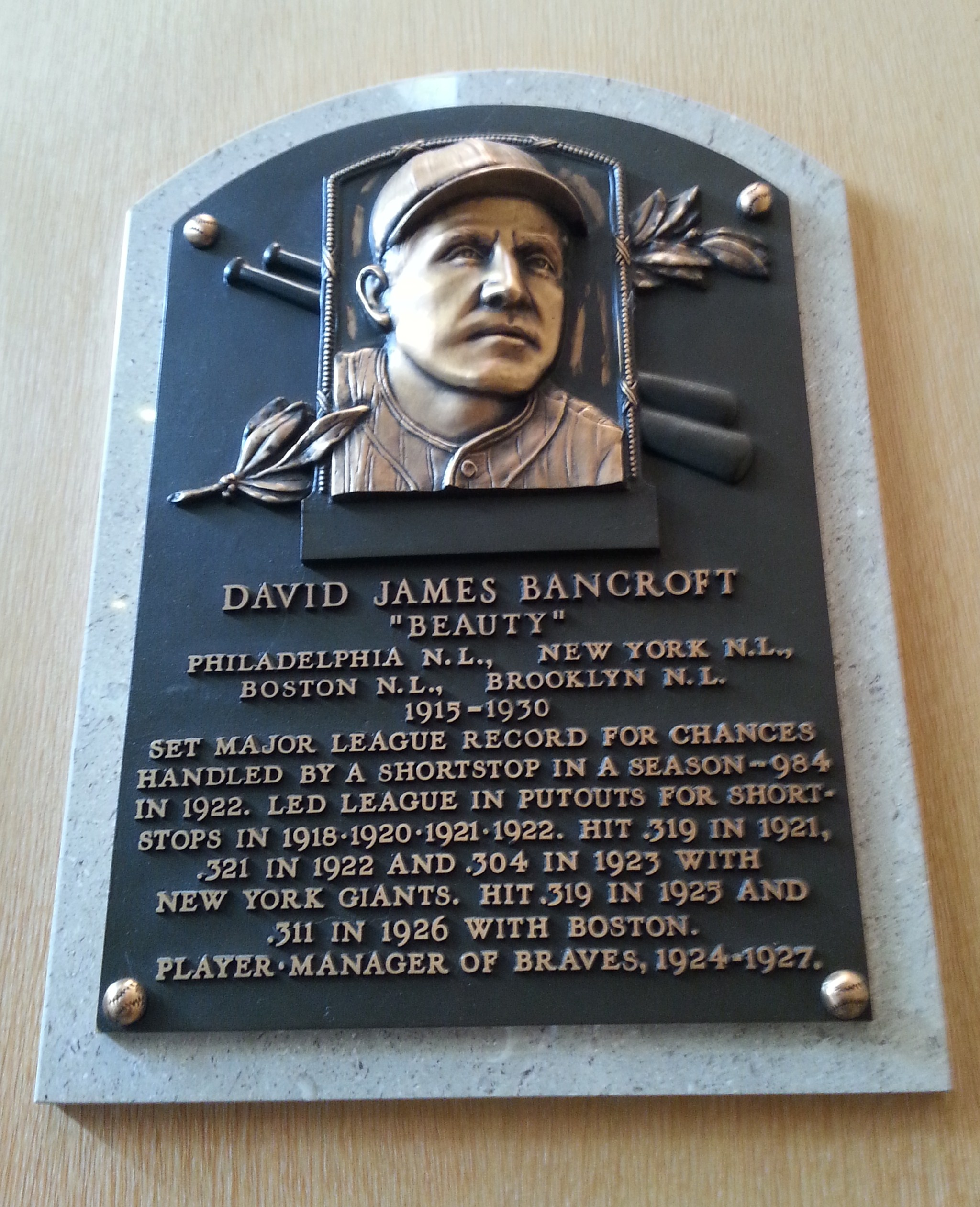
Bancroft's plaque at the Baseball Hall of Fame

Grover Cleveland Alexander, Bancroft's teammate in Philadelphia, and Hughie Jennings, his coach in New York, considered Bancroft one of the best shortstops in MLB. Sportswriter Frank Graham called Bancroft "the greatest shortstop the Giants ever had and one of the greatest that ever lived." Bancroft is still considered to be among the top fielders in baseball history. He was also considered one of the fastest shortstops in baseball. In contrast to other great fielding shortstops, Bancroft was noted for his offensive ability.

"Bancroft is one of the greatest shortstops in the history of the game. He can go equally well to his right or left, has a great arm, and is a good hitter. In addition, he is pretty fast on his feet. The best thing about Bancroft is, he can think. He uses his brain. He is more than a great mechanical player. A player like Banny at short means everything to a ball club."

– Hughie Jennings

After failing to be elected to the National Baseball Hall of Fame by the Baseball Writers' Association of America (BBWAA), the Veterans Committee elected Bancroft in 1971. Former Giants teammates Terry and Frankie Frisch, who joined the Veterans Committee in 1967, aided the elections of several of their former teammates; they shepherded the selections of Jesse Haines in 1970, Bancroft and Chick Hafey in 1971, Ross Youngs in 1972, George Kelly in 1973, Jim Bottomley in 1974, and Freddie Lindstrom in 1976. Bancroft, along with some of the other selections made by Terry and Frisch, has been considered among the weakest of all inductees. According to the BBWAA, the Veterans Committee was not selective enough in choosing members. Charges of cronyism were levied against the Veterans Committee. This led to the Veterans Committee having its powers reduced in subsequent years.

Despite the criticism of players elected to the Hall of Fame by the Veterans Committee in this period, Bancroft grades well in terms of sabermetric statistics. He finished fourth in the NL in Wins Above Replacement in 1920 (6.5) and third in 1921 (7.2) and 1922 (6.0). Bancroft was also inducted in The Des Moines Register's Iowa Sports Hall of Fame.

== Personal life ==
Bancroft married Edna Harriet Gisin while he played minor league baseball. They had no children and lived in Superior, Wisconsin, for the remainder of their lives.

After retiring from baseball, Bancroft worked as a warehouse supervisor with the Interprovincial Pipeline Company. He retired in 1956 and spent his later years hunting and fishing. Bancroft died on October 9, 1972, in a hospital in Superior at the age of 81.

== See also ==
- List of Major League Baseball player-managers
- List of Major League Baseball career hits leaders
- List of Major League Baseball career runs scored leaders
- List of Major League Baseball players to hit for the cycle
- List of Major League Baseball single-game hits leaders

Preceded by Bob Meusel	Hitting for the cycle June 1, 1921	Succeeded by George Sisler
