= Jestin Jacobs =

American football player (born 2001)

No. 4 – Oregon Ducks
- Position: Inside linebacker
- Class: Redshirt Senior

Personal information
- Born: January 25, 2001 (age 25)
- Listed height: 6 ft 3 in (1.91 m)
- Listed weight: 229 lb (104 kg)

Career information
- High school: Northmont (Clayton, Ohio)
- College: Iowa (2020–2022); Oregon (2023–present)
- Stats at ESPN

Jestin Jacobs (born January 25, 2001) is an American college football linebacker for the Oregon Ducks. He previously played for the Iowa Hawkeyes.

== Early life ==
Jacobs attended Northmont High School in Clayton, Ohio. As a senior, he notched 38 tackles and four sacks on defense to go along with 51 carries for 365 yards and seven touchdowns. Coming out of high school, Jacobs was rated as a four-star recruit and committed to play college football for the Iowa Hawkeyes over other schools such as Michigan State and Ohio State.

== College career ==
=== Iowa ===
In his first two seasons with the Hawkeyes in 2020 and 2021, Jacobs appeared in 19 games where he totaled 57 tackles with one being for a loss, two pass deflections, an interception, and a forced fumble. In 2022, he played in just two games due to injury, finishing the season with six tackles with one being for a loss, as a starter. After the season, Jacobs entered his name into the NCAA transfer portal.

=== Oregon ===
Jacobs transferred to play for the Oregon Ducks. He made his team debut in week 8 of the 2023 season, tallying six tackles and a sack in a win over Washington State. In the 2023 season, Jacobs appeared in just eight games due to injury, notching 32 tackles and a sack.

== Professional career ==
Pre-draft measurables
Height	Weight	Arm length	Hand span	40-yard dash	10-yard split	20-yard split	20-yard shuttle	Vertical jump	Broad jump	Bench press
6 ft 3 1/2 in (1.92 m)	229 lb (104 kg)	32 5/8 in (0.83 m)	8 1/4 in (0.21 m)	4.71 s	1.59 s	2.71 s	4.34 s	36.5 in (0.93 m)	10 ft 2 in (3.10 m)	17 reps
All values from Pro Day
