= Chris Bell (offensive tackle) =

American football player (born 1976)

Profile
- Position: Offensive tackle

Personal information
- Born: November 6, 1976 (age 50); Dayton, OH
- Listed height: 6 ft 8 in (2.03 m)
- Listed weight: 335 lb (152 kg)

Career information
- High school: Northmont High School, Clayton (OH)
- College: University of Cincinnati

Career history
- Green Bay Bombers (1999); Green Bay Packers (2000); Toronto Phantoms (2001–2002); Tennessee Valley Vipers (2002–2003); Carolina Cobras (2003); Georgia Force (2004); Fort Wayne Freedom (2004–2005); Port Huron Pirates (2006); Saginaw Sting (2008)
- Stats at ArenaFan.com

Chris Bell (born November 6, 1976) is an American former professional football offensive tackle. He spent time in the National Football League with the Green Bay Packers and in the Arena Football League with the Toronto Phantoms, the Carolina Cobras, and the Georgia Force. Bell played college football for the University of Cincinnati under head coach, Rick Minter. Bell also attended Northmont High School in Clayton, OH.
