= Kurt Coleman =

American football player (born 1988)

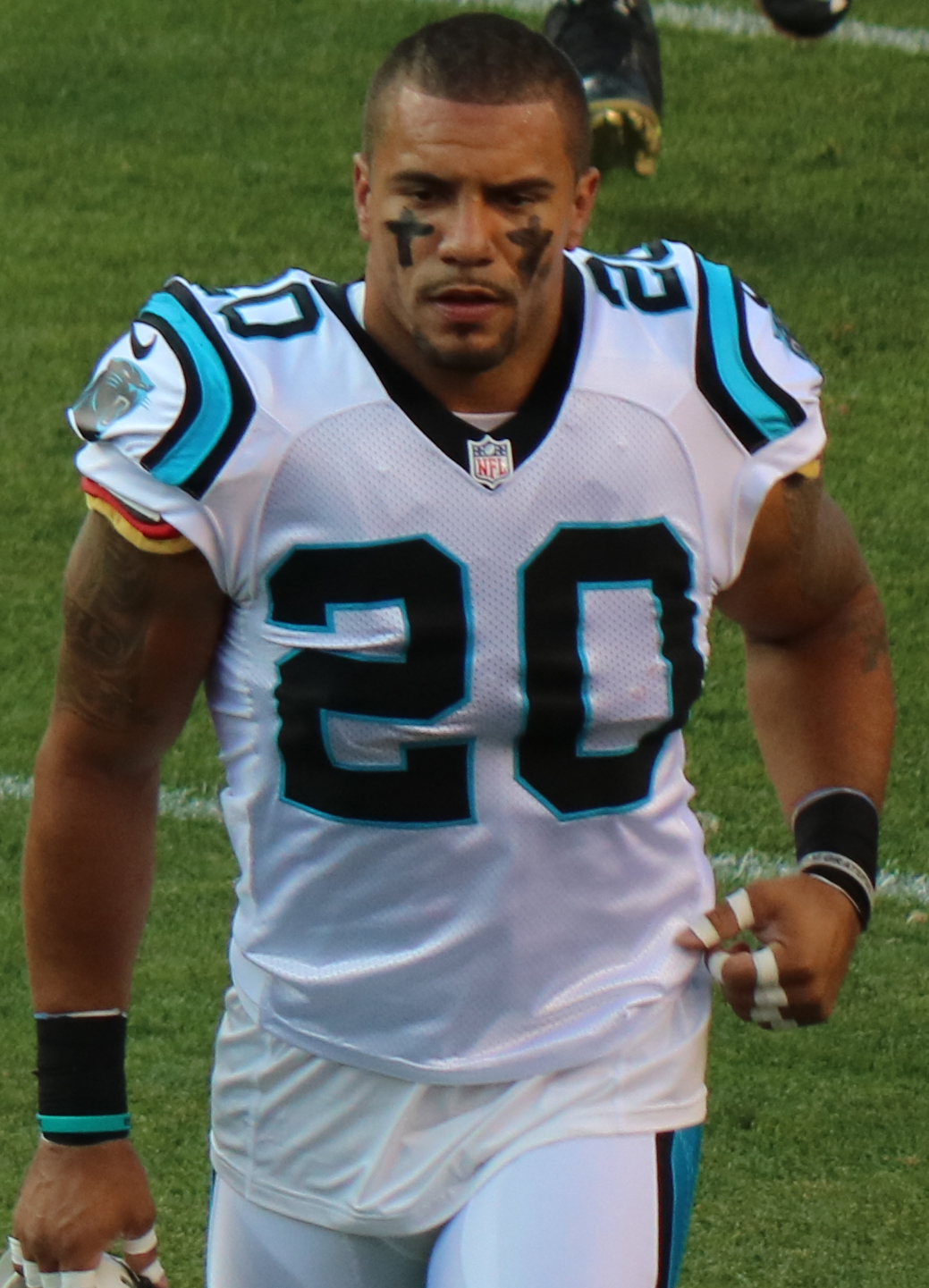
- Coleman with the Carolina Panthers in 2016

No. 42, 27, 20, 29, 28
- Position: Safety

Personal information
- Born: July 1, 1988 (age 38); Dayton, Ohio, U.S.
- Listed height: 5 ft 11 in (1.80 m)
- Listed weight: 208 lb (94 kg)

Career information
- High school: Northmont (Clayton, Ohio)
- College: Ohio State
- NFL draft: 2010: 7th round, 244th overall pick

Career history
- Philadelphia Eagles (2010–2013); Minnesota Vikings (2014)*; Kansas City Chiefs (2014); Carolina Panthers (2015–2017); New Orleans Saints (2018); Buffalo Bills (2019)
- * Offseason or practice squad member only

Awards and highlights
- First-team All-American (2009); First-team All-Big Ten (2009); Second-team All-Big Ten (2008)

Career NFL statistics
- Total tackles: 554
- Sacks: 2.0
- Forced fumbles: 5
- Fumble recoveries: 2
- Interceptions: 21
- Defensive touchdowns: 2
- Stats at Pro Football Reference

Kurt Coleman (born July 1, 1988) is an American former professional football player who was a safety in the National Football League (NFL). He played college football for the Ohio State Buckeyes and was selected by the Philadelphia Eagles in the seventh round of the 2010 NFL draft.

== Early life ==
Coleman graduated from Northmont High School in Clayton, Ohio in 2006. He was ranked 14th at the position of cornerback according to scout.com for 2006.

== College career ==
Coleman played college football for the Ohio State Buckeyes. At a spring practice during his first year, Coleman tackled wide receiver Tyson Gentry. Gentry became paralyzed. Coleman almost quit the football team before Gentry forgave him during a hospital visit. In 2009, Coleman made 68 tackles, five interceptions and three forced fumbles. He earned first-team All-American honors by Sporting News and first-team All-Big Ten honors.

== Professional career ==
External videos
- Kurt Coleman's NFL Combine Bio

Pre-draft measurables
Height	Weight	Arm length	Hand span	40-yard dash	10-yard split	20-yard split	20-yard shuttle	Three-cone drill	Vertical jump	Broad jump	Bench press
5 ft 10 1/4 in (1.78 m)	192 lb (87 kg)	30 3/4 in (0.78 m)	9 1/8 in (0.23 m)	4.55 s	1.53 s	2.64 s	4.15 s	6.81 s	34.5 in (0.88 m)	10 ft 2 in (3.10 m)	19 reps
All values are from NFL Combine/Ohio State's Pro Day

=== Philadelphia Eagles ===
The Philadelphia Eagles selected Coleman in the seventh round (244th overall) of the 2010 NFL draft. He was the 18th safety selected and the second safety drafted by the Eagles in 2010.

==== 2010 ====
On June 3, 2010, the Philadelphia Eagles signed Coleman to a four-year, $1.83 million contract that also includes a signing bonus of $43,400.

Throughout training camp, Coleman competed against Nate Allen and Quintin Demps to be the starting free safety after Marlin Jackson ruptured his Achilles tendon. On September 2, 2010, Coleman recorded five combined tackles and returned two fumble recoveries for touchdowns in the Eagles' 21–17 loss to the New York Jets in their fourth preseason game. Head coach Andy Reid named Coleman the backup safety to begin the regular season, behind starters Nate Allen and Quintin Mikell.

He made his professional regular season debut in the Philadelphia Eagles' season-opener against the Green Bay Packers and recorded two solo tackles in their 27–20 loss. He made his first career tackle on wide receiver Jordy Nelson during a 27-yard kick return by Nelson in the first quarter. On November 7, 2010, Coleman collected three combined tackles in the Eagles' 26–24 victory against the Indianapolis Colts. During the second quarter, Coleman received a penalty for unnecessary roughness after he was part of a helmet-to-helmet collision with wide receiver Austin Collie. The hit rendered Collie unconscious and he was immediately carted off the field and was later diagnosed with a concussion. NFL commissioner Roger Goodell chose not to fine Coleman for the hit. In Week 10, Coleman earned his first career start in place of Nate Allen who was inactive due to an injury. He made five combined tackles, deflected a pass, and made his first career interception off a pass by quarterback Donovan McNabb during a 59–28 win at the Washington Redskins. On December 20, 2010, it was reported that Coleman would assume the starting free safety role after Nate Allen sustained a season-ending knee injury against the New York Giants the previous week. In Week 16, he made his second career start and collected a season-high seven solo tackles in a 24–14 loss to the Minnesota Vikings. Coleman was inactive for Eagles' Week 17 loss to the Dallas Cowboys after head coach Andy Reid opted to rest him for the playoffs. He finished his rookie season with 36 combined tackles (31 solo), two pass deflections, and an interception in 15 games and two starts.

The Philadelphia Eagles finished first in the NFC East with a 10–6 record. On January 9, 2011, Coleman started in his first career playoff game and recorded seven combined tackles during a 21–16 loss to the eventual Super Bowl XLV Champions, the Green Bay Packers in the NFC Wildcard Game.

==== 2011 ====
Coleman entered training camp slated as the starting free safety after Quintin Mikell departed for the St. Louis Rams in free agency. Defensive coordinator Juan Castillo held a competition to name a new starting free safety between Coleman and rookie Jaiquawn Jarrett. Coleman was officially named the starter at free safety, alongside Nate Allen, to begin the regular season.

He started in the Philadelphia Eagles' season-opener at the St. Louis Rams and recorded four solo tackles in their 31–13 victory. In Week 3, Coleman was benched during a 29–16 loss to the New York Giants. Head coach Andy Reid played Jarrad Page in his place and he remained the starter ahead of Coleman for the next two games (Weeks 4–5). Coleman received his starting job back in Week 6 after Page was inactive for three games (Weeks 6–8) due to an injury. On October 16, 2011, Coleman collected seven combined tackles, deflected three passes, and intercepted three passes by quarterback Rex Grossman in the Eagles' 20–13 win at the Washington Redskins in Week 6. He was the first Eagles player since 1966 to have three interceptions in one game. His performance helped snap a four-game losing streak and earned him NFC Defensive Player of the Week. In Week 9, he collected a season-high 12 combined tackles (ten solo) during a 30–24 loss to the Chicago Bears. On November 27, 2011, Coleman made a season-high 11 solo tackles and assisted on a tackle in a 38–20 loss to the New England Patriots in Week 12. On December 28, 2011, the Philadelphia Eagles placed Coleman on injured reserve due to a biceps injury he sustained during a Week 16 win at the Dallas Cowboys. Coleman finished his second season with 78 combined tackles (56 solo), five pass deflections, and four interceptions in 15 games and 13 starts.

==== 2012 ====
Throughout training camp, Coleman competed against O. J. Atogwe and Jaiquawn Jarrett to maintain his job as the Eagles' starting free safety. Head coach Andy Reid named Coleman and Allen the starting safety duo to begin the 2012 regular season.

He started in the Philadelphia Eagles' season-opener at the Cleveland Browns and recorded five solo tackles, two pass deflections, and intercepted two passes by quarterback Brandon Weeden in the Eagles' 17–16 victory. In Week 3, he collected a season-high nine combined tackles and broke up a pass during a 27–6 loss at the Arizona Cardinals. On October 16, 2012, the Philadelphia Eagles fired defensive coordinator Juan Castillo and promoted their coach of the secondary, Todd Bowles. On October 28, 2012, Coleman collected a season-high eight solo tackles in the Eagles' 30–17 loss to the Atlanta Falcons in Week 8. In Week 13, Coleman made five combined tackles before exiting the Eagles' 38–33 loss at the Dallas Cowboys after suffering an injury to his chest. It was later discovered to be a bruised sternum and Coleman was sidelined for the next two games (Weeks 14–15). On December 31, 2012, it was announced that the Philadelphia Eagles had fired head coach Andy Reid after they finished fourth in the NFC East with a 4–12 record. He finished the 2012 season with 93 combined tackles (70 solo), four pass deflections, an interception, and a forced fumble in 14 games and 14 starts.

==== 2013 ====
Coleman participated in an open competition held by defensive coordinator Billy Davis to name two new starting safeties. During training camp, he competed against Kenny Phillips, Patrick Chung, Colt Anderson, Dave Sims, Nate Allen, and rookies Jordan Poyer and Earl Wolff. Head coach Chip Kelly named Coleman the backup free safety to begin the regular season, behind Patrick Chung. In Week 8, Coleman collected a season-high four combined tackles during a 48–20 win at the Oakland Raiders. He was sidelined for the Eagles' Week 16 victory against the Chicago Bears after straining his hamstring the previous week. Coleman finished his fourth season with 15 combined tackles (14 solo) in 15 games and zero starts.

The Philadelphia Eagles finished first in the NFC East with a 10–6 record in their first season under head coach Chip Kelly. On January 4, 2014, Coleman made one tackle in the Eagles' 26–24 loss to the New Orleans Saints in the NFC Wildcard Game.

Coleman became an unrestricted free agent after the 2014 season. He attended private visits with multiple teams, including the Minnesota Vikings, Indianapolis Colts, and New York Jets. On April 11, 2014, it was reported by ESPN that Coleman had received a contract offer from the Minnesota Vikings, but was still weighing his options.

=== Minnesota Vikings ===
On April 14, 2014, the Minnesota Vikings signed Coleman to a one-year, $900,000 contract. Throughout training camp, he competed for a job as a backup safety against Jamarca Sanford, Andrew Sendejo, Robert Blanton, Mistral Raymond, Chris Crocker, and Antone Exum. On August 31, 2014, the Minnesota Vikings released Coleman as part of their final roster cuts.

=== Kansas City Chiefs ===
On September 2, 2014, the Kansas City Chiefs signed Coleman to a one-year, $730,000 contract, reuniting him with Andy Reid, who served as his head coach in Philadelphia. Defensive coordinator Bob Sutton named him the backup free safety to start the regular season, behind Eric Berry.

On September 14, 2014, Coleman made his Kansas City Chiefs' debut during a 24–17 loss at the Denver Broncos in Week 2. In Week 4, he made his first start of the season and made one tackle during their 41–14 win against the New England Patriots. On November 9, 2014, Coleman collected a season-high six combined tackles in the Chiefs' 17–13 victory at the Buffalo Bills in Week 10. In Week 17, Coleman made two solo tackles, two pass deflections, and intercepted two passes by Philip Rivers in a 19–7 victory against the San Diego Chargers. He finished his only season with the Kansas City Chiefs with a total of 37 combined tackles (34 solo), six pass deflections, three interceptions, and a forced fumble in 15 games and three starts.

He became an unrestricted free agent after completing his one-year contract with the Chiefs. Coleman's representatives met with personnel from the Chiefs at the NFL Combine, but both parties were unable to reach an agreement for him to return to Kansas City.

=== Carolina Panthers ===
==== 2015 ====
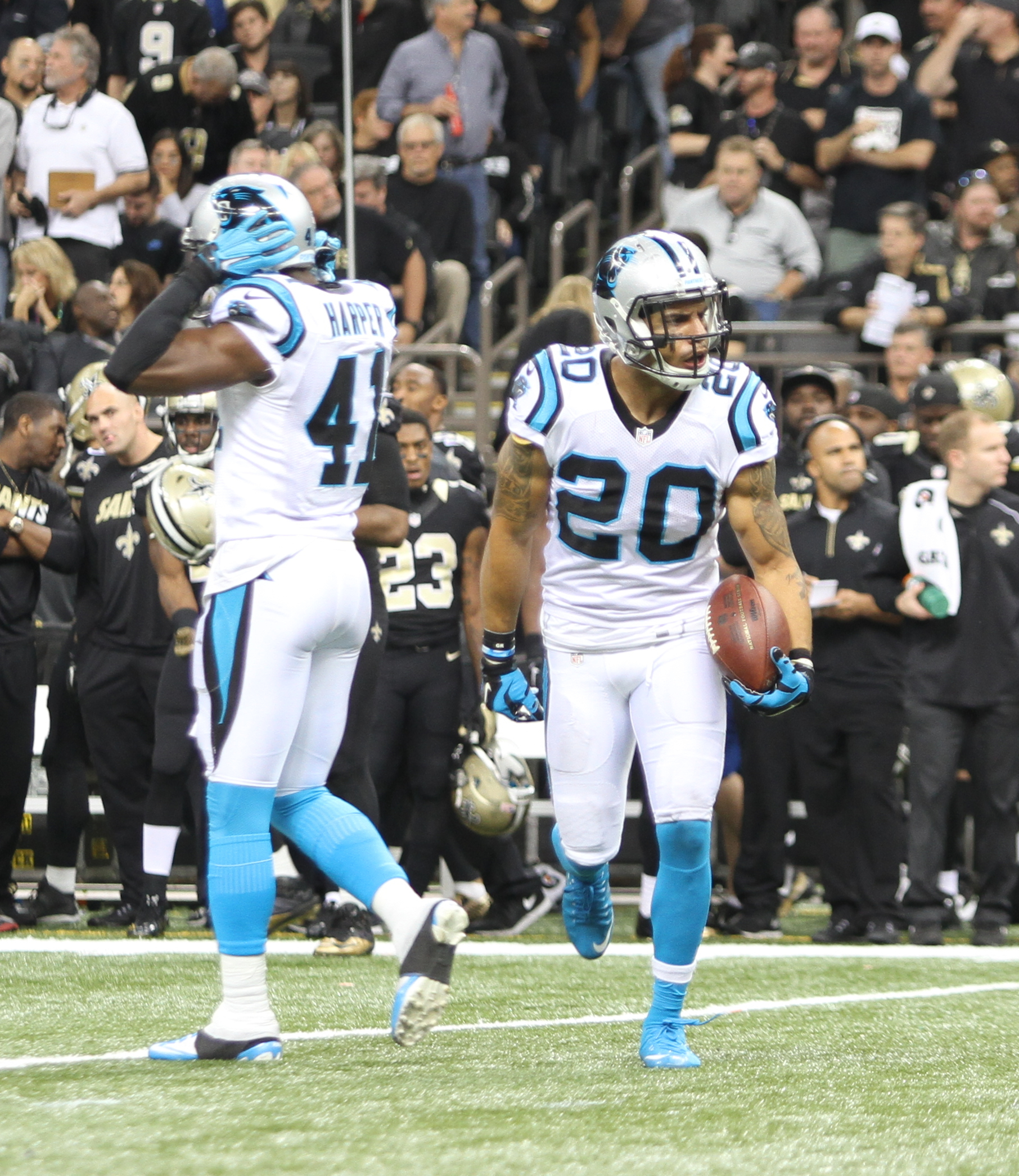
Coleman (right) playing for the Panthers in 2015.

On March 16, 2015, the Carolina Panthers signed Coleman to a two-year, $2.80 million contract with $600,000 guaranteed. He reunited with defensive coordinator Sean McDermott, who previously coached the Philadelphia Eagles' secondary.

During training camp, Coleman competed against Tre Boston for the job as the starting free safety. Head coach Ron Rivera officially named Coleman the starting free safety to begin the regular season, opposite strong safety Roman Harper.

On November 8, 2015, he made six combined tackles and recorded his first career sack on quarterback Aaron Rodgers in the Panthers' 37–29 win against the Green Bay Packers. In Week 10, Coleman collected five combined tackles, broke up a pass, and intercepted a pass attempt by Marcus Mariota during a 27–10 victory at the Tennessee Titans. On November 26, 2015, Coleman made three combined tackles, deflected a pass, and returned an interception by Tony Romo for a 36-yard touchdown in the Panthers' 33–14 win at the Dallas Cowboys in Week 12. The interception returned for a touchdown marked the first score of his career and also continued his three-game interception streak. On December 13, 2015, he made nine combined tackles, a pass deflection, and intercepted a pass attempt by quarterback Matt Ryan as the Panthers routed the Atlanta Falcons 38–0 in Week 14. The interception marked his seventh pick of the season and became his fifth consecutive game with an interception. The following week, Coleman collected a season-high 13 combined tackles (eight solo) in the Panthers' 38–35 victory at the New York Giants in Week 15. He finished his first season with the Carolina Panthers with 90 combined tackles (55 solo), nine pass deflections, a career-high seven interceptions, a sack, and a touchdown in 15 games and 15 starts. Pro Football Focus gave Coleman the seventh highest overall grade among safeties in 2015.

The Carolina Panthers finished first in the NFC South with a 15–1 record and received home-field advantage and a first round bye. The Panthers began the playoffs by defeating the Seattle Seahawks 31–24 in the NFC Divisional Round. On January 24, 2016, Coleman recorded four combined tackles, two pass deflections, and intercepted two passes by quarterback Carson Palmer during a 49–15 victory against the Arizona Cardinals in the NFC Championship Game. On February 7, 2016, Coleman started in Super Bowl 50 and recorded five combined tackles as the Carolina Panthers lost to the Denver Broncos by a score of 24–10.

==== 2016 ====
On July 26, 2016, the Carolina Panthers signed Coleman to a three-year, $17 million contract extension that includes $7 million guaranteed.

In Week 4, Coleman collected six solo tackles, deflected a pass, and returned an interception for an eight-yard touchdown during a 48–33 loss at the Atlanta Falcons. On November 27, 2016, Coleman recorded a season-high 11 combined tackles (eight solo) before exiting the Panthers' 35–33 loss at the Oakland Raiders in the fourth quarter due to a concussion. He was sidelined due to the concussion and missed the Panthers' 40–7 loss at the Seattle Seahawks the following week. He finished the season with a career-high 95 combined tackles (66 solo), seven pass deflections, four interceptions, and a touchdown in 15 games and 15 starts. Pro Football Focus gave Coleman an overall grade of 79.2, which ranked him 41st among the 90 NFL safeties that qualified in 2016.

==== 2017 ====
Defensive coordinator Steve Wilks named Coleman the starting strong safety to begin the regular season, alongside starting free safety Mike Adams. On October 1, 2017, Coleman recorded two combined tackles before exiting in the second quarter of a 33–30 victory at the New England Patriots due to a knee injury. He was declared inactive for the next three games (Weeks 5–7) after it was discovered he sprained his MCL. On December 24, 2017, Coleman collected a season-high ten combined tackles (eight solo) in the Panthers 22–19 win against the Tampa Bay Buccaneers. Coleman was sidelined for the Panthers' Week 17 loss at the Atlanta Falcons after sustaining an ankle injury. He finished the 2017 season with 76 combined tackles (51 solo) and three pass deflections in 12 games and 12 starts. Pro Football Focus gave Coleman an overall grade of 47.0, ranking 76th among all qualified safeties in 2017.

On February 26, 2018, Coleman was released by the Panthers.

=== New Orleans Saints ===
On March 3, 2018, the New Orleans Saints signed Coleman to a three-year, $16.35 million contract that also includes $6.20 million guaranteed and a signing bonus of $4.50 million. He played in 16 games with nine starts, recording 32 tackles and a forced fumble.

On February 21, 2019, Coleman was released by the Saints.

=== Buffalo Bills ===
On July 19, 2019, Coleman signed a one-year contract with the Buffalo Bills. In the 2019 season, he appeared in 14 games, mainly in a special teams role. In the regular season finale against the Jets, he played a lot of snaps on defense.

== NFL career statistics ==
Legend
**Bold**	Career high

=== Regular season ===
Year	Team	Games		Tackles					Interceptions					Fumbles			
Year	Team	GP	GS	Cmb	Solo	Ast	Sck	TFL	Int	Yds	TD	Lng	PD	FF	FR	Yds	TD
2010	PHI	15	2	36	31	5	0.0	2	1	7	0	7	2	0	0	0	0
2011	PHI	15	13	78	56	22	0.0	1	4	60	0	35	5	**1**	0	0	0
2012	PHI	14	14	93	**70**	23	0.0	3	2	13	0	7	4	**1**	0	0	0
2013	PHI	15	0	14	13	1	0.0	0	0	0	0	0	0	0	0	0	0
2014	KC	15	3	37	34	3	0.0	0	3	12	0	12	6	**1**	**1**	0	0
2015	CAR	15	**15**	90	55	**35**	**1.0**	**5**	**7**	**89**	**1**	36	**9**	0	0	0	0
2016	CAR	15	**15**	**95**	66	29	**1.0**	1	4	57	**1**	**37**	7	**1**	0	0	0
2017	CAR	12	12	76	51	25	0.0	2	0	0	0	0	3	0	**1**	0	0
2018	NO	**16**	9	32	22	10	0.0	1	0	0	0	0	0	**1**	0	0	0
2019	BUF	14	0	3	3	0	0.0	1	0	0	0	0	0	0	0	0	0
Total		146	83	554	401	153	2.0	16	21	238	2	37	36	5	2	0	0

=== Playoffs ===
Year	Team	Games		Tackles					Interceptions					Fumbles			
Year	Team	GP	GS	Cmb	Solo	Ast	Sck	TFL	Int	Yds	TD	Lng	PD	FF	FR	Yds	TD
2010	PHI	1	1	7	6	1	0.0	0	0	0	0	0	0	0	0	0	0
2013	PHI	1	0	1	1	0	0.0	0	0	0	0	0	0	0	0	0	0
2015	CAR	**3**	**3**	**17**	**10**	**7**	0.0	0	**2**	0	0	0	**2**	0	0	0	0
2017	CAR	1	1	1	1	0	0.0	0	0	0	0	0	1	**1**	0	0	0
2018	NO	2	0	1	0	1	0.0	0	0	0	0	0	0	0	0	0	0
2019	BUF	1	0	0	0	0	0.0	0	0	0	0	0	0	0	0	0	0
Total		9	5	27	18	9	0.0	0	2	0	0	0	3	1	0	0	0

== Personal life ==
Coleman co-founded the Ohio State chapter of Uplifting Athletes. Coleman's father, Ron, was diagnosed with breast cancer in December 2006. Ron was an assistant principal at Walter E. Stebbins High School in Riverside, Ohio. Ron Coleman was a physical fitness teacher and a varsity basketball coach at Stebbins High School in Riverside, Ohio for the 2019–2020 school year. He died on September 21, 2023, at the age of 72.
