= Rod Moore =

American football player (born 2003)

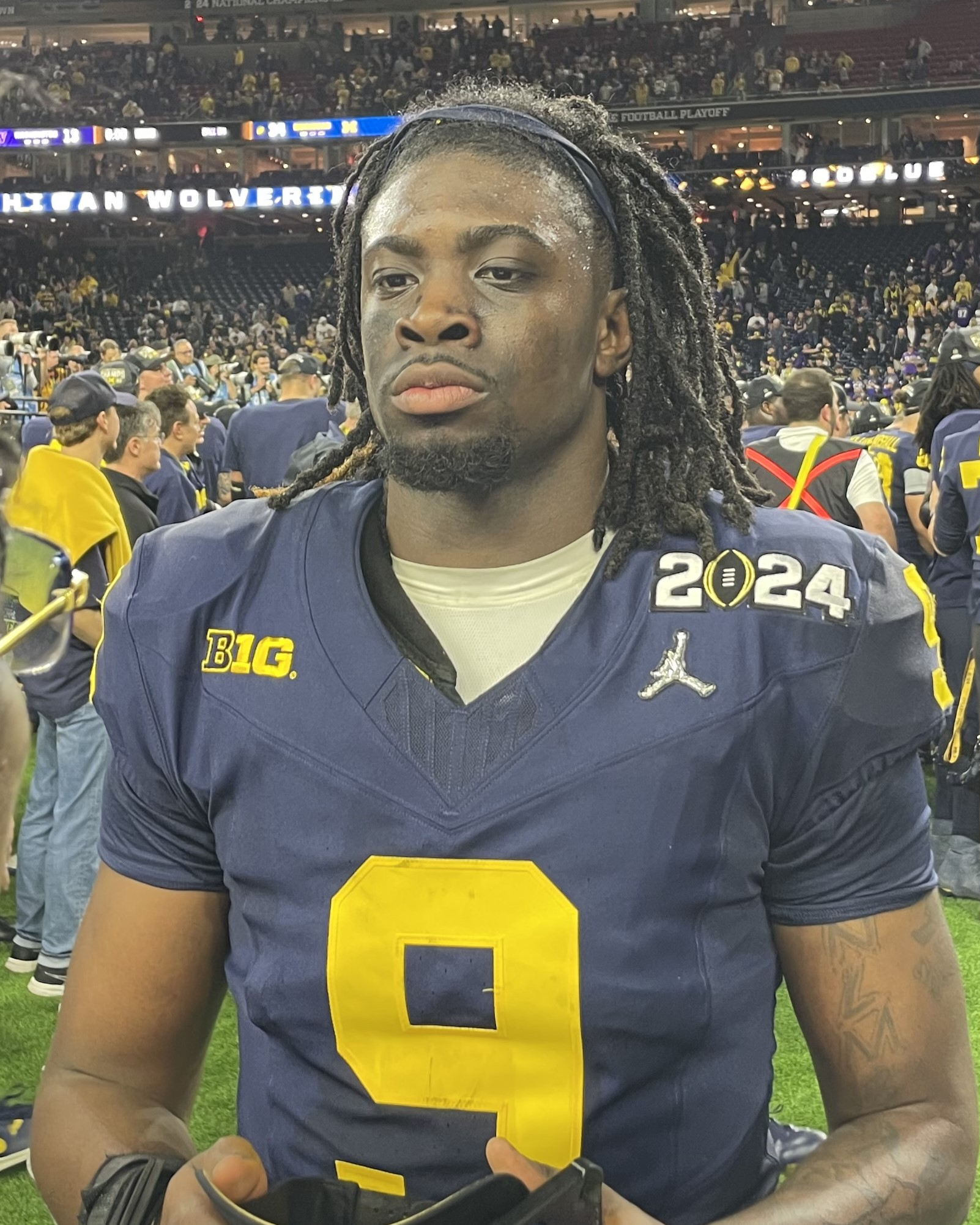
- Moore with Michigan in 2024

No. 1 – Michigan Wolverines
- Position: Safety
- Class: Senior

Personal information
- Born: July 3, 2003 (age 23)
- Listed height: 5 ft 11 in (1.80 m)
- Listed weight: 190 lb (86 kg)

Career information
- High school: Northmont (Clayton, Ohio)
- College: Michigan (2021–present)

Awards and highlights
- CFP national champion (2023); Third-team All-Big Ten (2023)
- Stats at ESPN

Roderick Devaughn Moore Jr. (born July 3, 2003) is an American college football safety for the Michigan Wolverines. He won three consecutive Big Ten Conference titles and a national championship in 2023.

== Early life ==
Roderick Devaughn Moore Jr. was born on July 3, 2003, the son of Roderick Sr. and Janice Moore, and attended Northmont High School in Clayton, Ohio. As a junior, Moore recorded 85 tackles, four interceptions and three forced fumbles. As a senior, Moore was named All-State, finishing the COVID-19 shortened season with 68 tackles and an interception. He also caught 28 passes for 440 yards and eight touchdowns. While still in high school, Moore ran a 40 yard dash in 4.38 seconds at a Pittsburgh Panthers recruiting camp. 247Sports rated him as four-star recruit and the No. 12 ranked player in Ohio. Moore committed to play college football at the University of Michigan. He graduated in 2025 with a Bachelor of Arts from Michigan's College of Literature, Science, and the Arts.

== College career ==
=== Freshman season (2021) ===
In 2021, Moore enrolled at the University of Michigan, playing in 11 games, with four starts. His first career start came against Penn State on November 13, where he would total six tackles. On November 27 versus Ohio State, Moore again started, collecting nine tackles and establishing his role in the Michigan defense. He finished his freshman season with a total of 33 tackles, and shared team Defensive Rookie of the Year honors.

=== Sophomore season (2022) ===
In 2022, Moore appeared in all 14 games, starting in 13. On September 3, in the first game of the season against Colorado State, Moore recorded his first career interception. During the 2022 Big Ten Championship Game, he posted a career-high 14 tackles. In the 2022 Fiesta Bowl, he led the team in tackles with 12, and recorded an interception. Moore ended his sophomore season with 71 tackles and a team high four interceptions. He was an All-Big Ten honorable mention.

=== Junior season (2023) ===
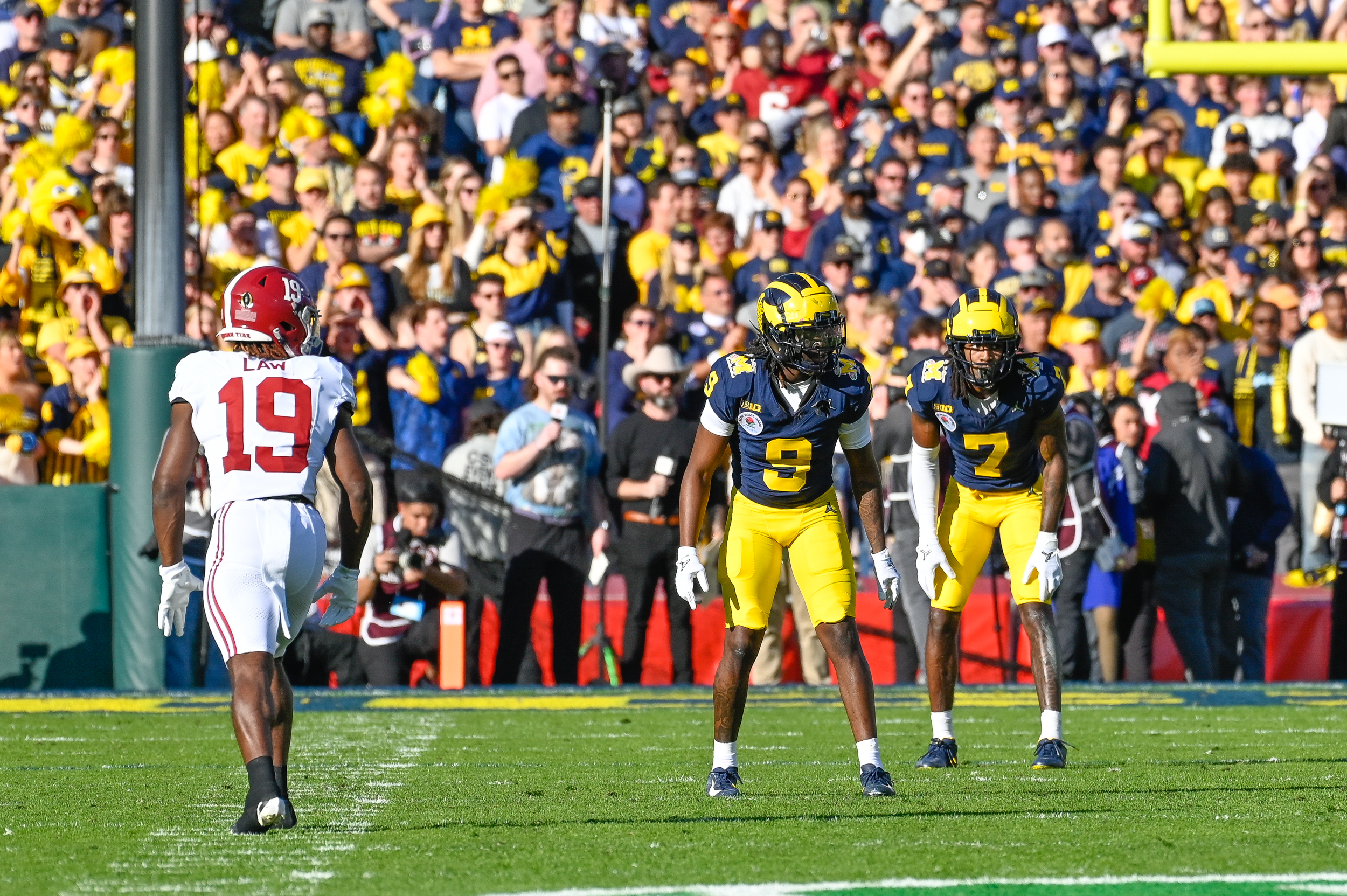
Moore (No. 9) in the 2024 Rose Bowl

In 2023, Moore was listed as the preseason No. 5 ranked safety in college football, after being named an All-American honorable mention by Pro Football Focus as a sophomore. As a junior, Moore helped Michigan win a third consecutive Big Ten conference title, and a national championship.

His most glorious moment came against Ohio State, on November 25. Moore intercepted Ohio State quarterback Kyle McCord on the Buckeyes' final drive. Moore started 11 games for the Wolverines, finishing the season with 38 tackles and 2 interceptions. He was a third-team All-Big Ten selection.

=== Senior season(s) (2024–2026) ===
Following Michigan’s national championship celebration, Moore announced he was returning for his senior season in 2024. Pro Football Focus named Moore as the best safety in college football to turn down the 2024 NFL draft. On March 25, 2024, Moore suffered a torn ACL during spring practice. Despite his injury, he was voted as a team captain for the 2024 season.

After missing the entire 2024 season, Moore returned for a fifth year in 2025. Moore was again voted a captain, but missed most the season due to his knee injury and played sparingly in only three games. Moore was granted a second consecutive medical redshirt and returned to Michigan in 2026, where he became the first three-time captain for the program since the 1880s.
