= Jesse Haines =

American baseball player (1893–1978)

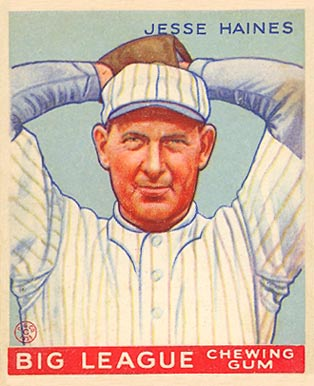
- Pitcher
- Born: July 22, 1893; Clayton, Ohio, U.S.
- Died: August 5, 1978 (aged 85); Dayton, Ohio, U.S.
- Batted: Right Threw: Right

MLB debut
- July 20, 1918, for the Cincinnati Reds

Last MLB appearance
- September 10, 1937, for the St. Louis Cardinals

MLB statistics
- Win–loss record: 210–158
- Earned run average: 3.64
- Strikeouts: 981
- Stats at Baseball Reference

Teams
- Cincinnati Reds (1918); St. Louis Cardinals (1920–1937)

Career highlights and awards
- 3× World Series champion (1926, 1931, 1934); Pitched a no-hitter on July 17, 1924; St. Louis Cardinals Hall of Fame

Member of the National

Baseball Hall of Fame
- Induction: 1970
- Election method: Veterans Committee

Jesse Joseph Haines (July 22, 1893 – August 5, 1978), nicknamed "Pop", was an American professional baseball pitcher for the Cincinnati Reds and St. Louis Cardinals of Major League Baseball (MLB). After a lengthy stint in minor league baseball, he played briefly in 1918, then from 1920 to 1937. He spent nearly his entire major league career with the Cardinals. Haines pitched on three World Series championship teams. Though he had a kind personality off the field, Haines was known as a fiery competitor during games.

After retiring in 1937 with a 210–158 win–loss record, Haines was a coach with the Brooklyn Dodgers in 1938. He left baseball after that season and returned to his native Ohio. He was elected to the Baseball Hall of Fame in 1970. In 2014, he was inducted into the St. Louis Cardinals Hall of Fame Museum. He ranks second in franchise history in shutouts.

== Early life ==
Haines was born in Clayton, Ohio, but he grew up in nearby Phillipsburg, where he attended local schools. His father Elias worked as an auctioneer. Haines wanted to play baseball for the local team in Phillipsburg. His parents did not approve of him playing baseball on Sundays, so Haines used to sneak away, hiding his uniform in a corn crib and changing clothes in a cornfield. He left town to play semipro baseball in Dayton in 1912. Soon thereafter, he was signed to play for a minor league team in Dayton.

Spending several seasons in minor league baseball, Haines also pitched for teams in Saginaw, Fort Wayne, Springfield (Springfield Reapers), Topeka and Tulsa. He had played briefly in the major leagues with the Cincinnati Reds in 1918, but he returned to the minor leagues. Across his minor league career, he compiled a 107–61 record and 1.93 ERA over 187 games.

Branch Rickey of the St. Louis Cardinals noticed Haines while he was pitching in Kansas City, but the team was struggling with money. He convinced a group of the team's stockholders to take out a $10,000 loan for the purchase of Haines's contract.

During his minor league days, Haines married Carrie M. Weidner. They had one child.

== Major league career ==
1936 World Wide Gum card of Haines for St. Louis Cardinals

Haines became a fixture in the Cardinals starting rotation in 1920. Despite a 13–20 record, he pitched 301 2/3 innings, the highest output of his career, and recorded a 2.98 earned run average (ERA).

Author Paul Doutrich writes that while Haines was a mild-mannered individual, he had no patience for losing games and "became a raging bull when on the mound." Haines threw a no-hitter on July 17, 1924, against the Boston Braves; more than 50 years passed before a St. Louis pitcher threw another no-hitter at home.

Haines pitched on three World Series championship teams, winning two games in the 1926 World Series. In game seven of that series, Haines developed a bleeding blister and had to be removed from the game with the bases loaded in the seventh inning. Grover Cleveland Alexander was inserted into the game and struck out Tony Lazzeri.

As his career went on, Haines became known as "Pop" because of the influence he exerted on younger teammates. His use of the knuckleball allowed him to extend his career after his other pitches became ineffective. Unlike other knuckleball pitchers who gripped the pitch with their fingertips, Haines actually held the ball with his knuckles, throwing it as hard as he could.

Haines began to pitch fewer games in 1932. By 1936, manager Frankie Frisch thought that Haines had become too old and held him out of any games until May. However, he got more opportunities that year as the St. Louis pitching staff struggled with injuries. By June, he made relief pitching appearances three days in a row.

He retired in 1937, having pitched to the age of 43. He won 20 games or more three times for the Cardinals and won three World Series championships (1926, 1931, and 1934), though he did not pitch in the 1931 series. In the 1926 World Series against the Yankees, he went 2–0 with a 1.08 ERA. He retired with a 210–158 record, 981 strikeouts, 3.64 ERA, and 3208 2/3 innings pitched. He is one of just nine players with 200 wins and less than 1,000 strikeouts.

== Later life ==
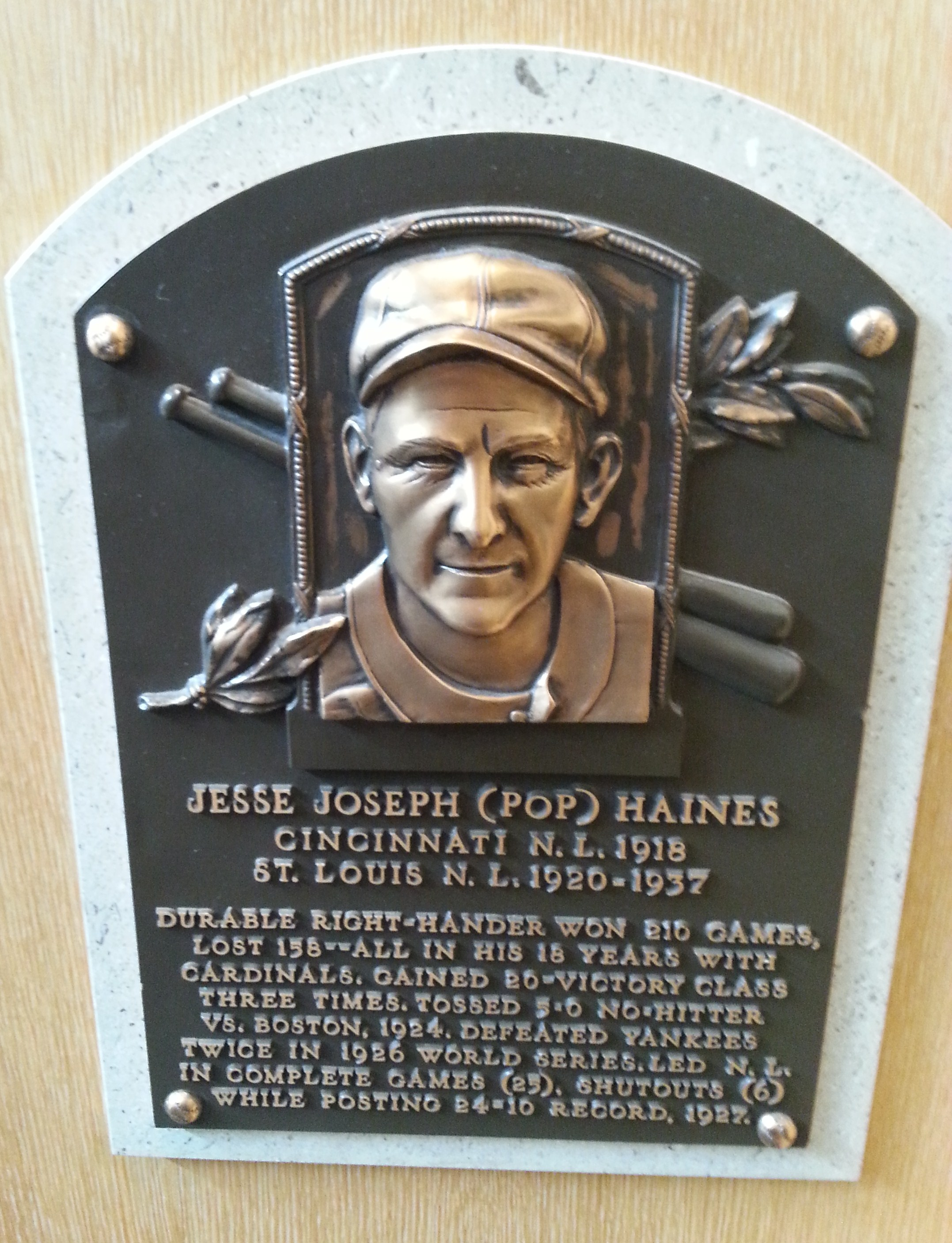
Haines' plaque at the National Baseball Hall of Fame and Museum

Haines worked on the coaching staff of the Brooklyn Dodgers in 1938. After that, he was an auditor for almost 30 years in Montgomery County, Ohio.

After failing to gain more than 8.3% of the votes for induction into the Baseball Hall of Fame over a 12-year period, Haines was voted in by the Veterans Committee in 1970. Frankie Frisch, a member of the VC, also shepherded the selections of his teammates Dave Bancroft and Chick Hafey in 1971, Ross Youngs in 1972, George Kelly in 1973, Jim Bottomley in 1974, and Freddie Lindstrom in 1976. After the committee selected Haines, Frisch commented that Haines was "a worthy, worthy man... a great competitor, a fine fellow off and on the field." Sabermetrician Bill James has listed Haines as one of ten examples of Hall of Fame inductees who do not deserve the honor.

He died in 1978 in Dayton, Ohio after a 28-year career as Montgomery County (Ohio) Assessor. His grave in Clayton, Ohio, which incorporates the sundial that the Cardinals gave Haines upon his retirement, has become a local attraction.

== Legacy ==
In January 2014, the Cardinals announced Haines among 22 former players and personnel to be inducted into the St. Louis Cardinals Hall of Fame Museum for the inaugural class of 2014.

== See also ==
- List of St. Louis Cardinals team records
- List of knuckleball pitchers
- List of Major League Baseball career wins leaders
- List of Major League Baseball no-hitters

Preceded by Howard Ehmke	No-hitter pitcher July 17, 1924	Succeeded by Dazzy Vance
