= Phillipsburg, Ohio =

- Village
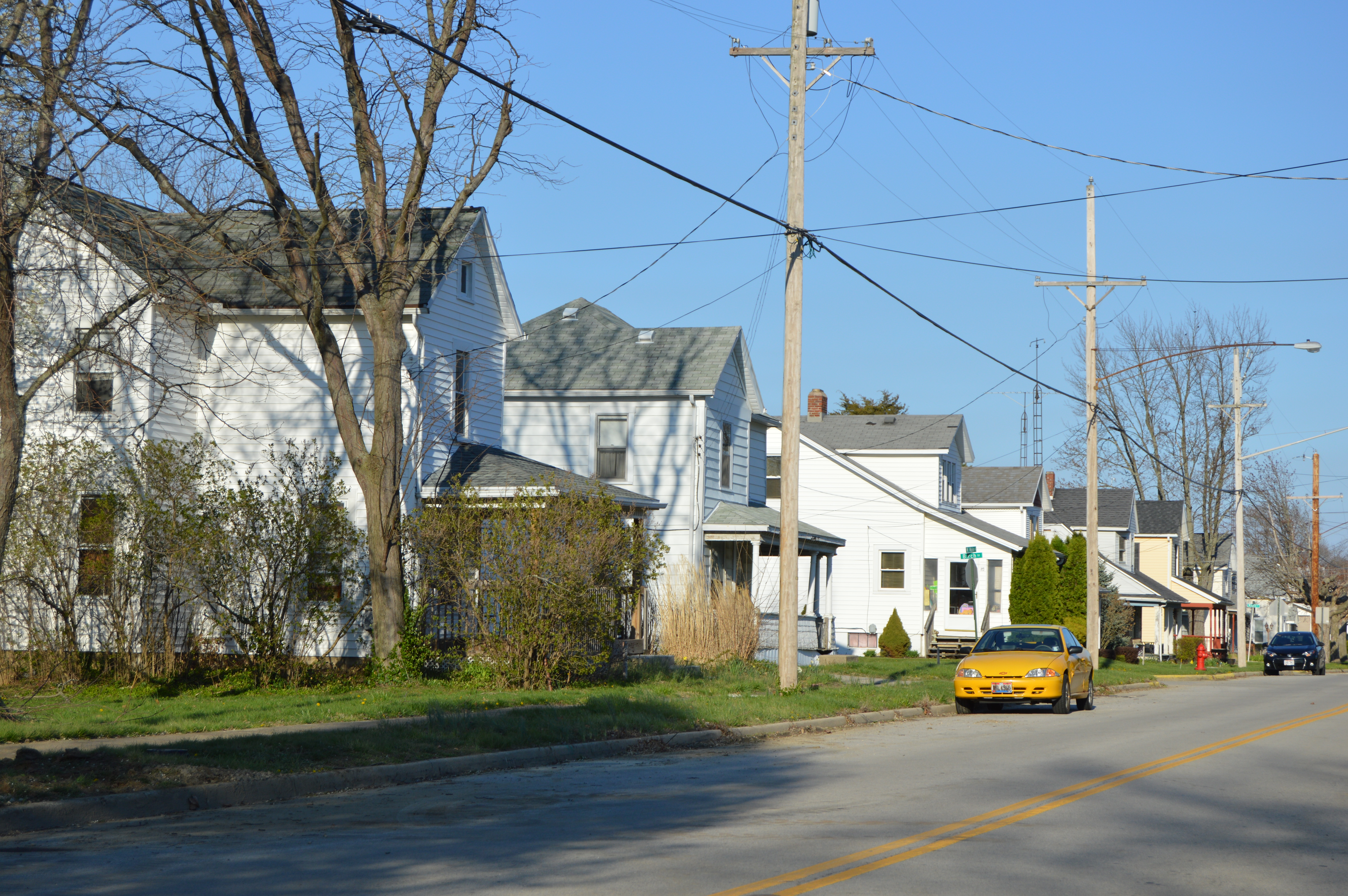
- West Main Street

- Location in Montgomery County and the state of Ohio.
- Coordinates: 39°54′14″N 84°24′04″W
- Country: United States
- State: Ohio
- County: Montgomery
- Township: Clay

Area
  - Total: 0.27 sq mi (0.70 km^{2})
  - Land: 0.27 sq mi (0.70 km^{2})
  - Water: 0.00 sq mi (0 km^{2})
- Elevation: 1,034 ft (315 m)

Population (2020)
  - Total: 498
  - Density: 1,872.18/sq mi (722.85/km^{2})
- Time zone: UTC-5 (Eastern (EST))
  - Summer (DST): UTC-4 (EDT)
- ZIP code: 45354
- Area codes: 937, 326
- FIPS code: 39-62414
- GNIS feature ID: 2399662
- Website: phillipsburgoh.gov

Phillipsburg is a village in Montgomery County, Ohio, United States. The population was 498 at the 2020 census. It is part of the Dayton Metropolitan Statistical Area.

== History ==
Phillipsburg was platted in 1836, and named for Philip Studybaker, a member of the town company. A post office was established as Centre in 1848, the name was changed to Center in 1893, and changed again to Phillipsburg in 1903. Phillipsburg was incorporated as a village in 1899.

== Geography ==
According to the United States Census Bureau, the village has a total area of 0.27 square miles (0.70 km^{2}), all land.

== Demographics ==
Historical population
Census	Pop.	Note	%±
1870	187		—
1880	215		15.0%
1890	270		25.6%
1910	343		—
1920	348		1.5%
1930	436		25.3%
1940	504		15.6%
1950	609		20.8%
1960	715		17.4%
1970	831		16.2%
1980	705		−15.2%
1990	644		−8.7%
2000	628		−2.5%
2010	557		−11.3%
2020	498		−10.6%
U.S. Decennial Census

=== 2010 census ===
As of the census of 2010, there were 557 people, 235 households, and 163 families living in the village. The population density was 2,063.0 inhabitants per square mile (796.5/km^{2}). There were 255 housing units at an average density of 944.4 per square mile (364.6/km^{2}). The racial makeup of the village was 97.7% White, 1.4% African American, 0.4% Asian, 0.4% from other races, and 0.2% from two or more races. Hispanic or Latino of any race were 3.2% of the population.

There were 235 households, of which 30.2% had children under the age of 18 living with them, 47.2% were married couples living together, 14.0% had a female householder with no husband present, 8.1% had a male householder with no wife present, and 30.6% were non-families. 26.4% of all households were made up of individuals, and 8.1% had someone living alone who was 65 years of age or older. The average household size was 2.37 and the average family size was 2.81.

The median age in the village was 40.4 years. 21.5% of residents were under the age of 18; 7.8% were between the ages of 18 and 24; 28% were from 25 to 44; 24.1% were from 45 to 64; and 18.5% were 65 years of age or older. The gender makeup of the village was 51.3% male and 48.7% female.

=== 2000 census ===
As of the census of 2000, there were 628 people, 250 households, and 188 families living in the village. The population density was 2,365.2 inhabitants per square mile (913.2/km^{2}). There were 257 housing units at an average density of 967.9 per square mile (373.7/km^{2}). The racial makeup of the village was 98.57% White, 0.80% African American, 0.32% Native American, 0.16% from other races, and 0.16% from two or more races. Hispanic or Latino of any race were 0.80% of the population.

There were 250 households, out of which 30.4% had children under the age of 18 living with them, 60.8% were married couples living together, 10.0% had a female householder with no husband present, and 24.4% were non-families. 20.4% of all households were made up of individuals, and 10.0% had someone living alone who was 65 years of age or older. The average household size was 2.51 and the average family size was 2.89.

In the village, the population was spread out, with 24.5% under the age of 18, 7.8% from 18 to 24, 27.9% from 25 to 44, 25.0% from 45 to 64, and 14.8% who were 65 years of age or older. The median age was 37 years. For every 100 females there were 93.8 males. For every 100 females age 18 and over, there were 95.1 males.

The median income for a household in the village was $41,458, and the median income for a family was $47,969. Males had a median income of $37,625 versus $25,917 for females. The per capita income for the village was $17,687. About 5.1% of families and 6.1% of the population were below the poverty line, including 9.3% of those under age 18 and 12.2% of those age 65 or over.

== Education ==
Phillipsburg is served by the Northmont City School District of Montgomery County, Ohio. The schools include:

- Northmont High School
- Northmont Middle School
- Englewood Elementary
- Englewood Hills Elementary
- Northmoor Elementary
- Northwood Elementary
- Union Elementary

Phillipsburg Elementary School was closed in 2009, with its students being sent to Union Elementary School, and the property was sold to a private owner in the following November.

== Transportation ==
=== Major highways ===
Ohio State Route 49 bisects Phillipsburg 4 miles north of I-70 in Montgomery County, Ohio

=== Airports ===
Phillipsburg Airport is located on the Northeast edge of the village of Phillipsburg. The airport was opened in 1949 and remains active to this day. The airport is home to 35 aircraft and averages 186 aircraft operations per day. Phillipsburg Airport was originally named Myer's Airport after its original owner John L. Myers. Today, it remains privately owned.

== Notable people ==
- Jesse Haines, pitcher in Baseball Hall of Fame, raised in Phillipsburg
