= Northmont High School =

Northmont Senior High School

Location
- 4916 National Road; Clayton, Ohio 45315; USA; 39°52′21″N 84°20′53″W

Information
- Type: Public secondary
- Established: 1957
- School district: Northmont City Schools
- Principal: Thomas David Evans
- Teaching staff: 81.60 (FTE)
- Grades: 9–12
- Enrollment: 1,371 (2023–2024)
- Student to teacher ratio: 16.80
- Colors: Kelly Green & Gold
- Athletics conference: GWOC
- Mascot: Thunderbolt
- Nickname: T-Bolts, Bolts
- Newspaper: The Thunder
- Yearbook: The Bolt
- Website: Northmont Website

Northmont High School is a public high school in Clayton, Ohio. It is the primary high school in the Northmont City School District. The school serves approximately 1700 students from the communities of northern Montgomery County, including Clayton, Englewood, Phillipsburg, Clayton Township, and Union.

== Departments ==
- Applied Technology
- Art
- Business & Technology
- Foreign Language
- Health & Physical Education
- Language Arts
- Mathematics
- Navy Junior ROTC
- Performing Arts
- Science
- Social Studies
- Special Education
- Vocational
- Work & Family life

== Academics ==
The Northmont High School's curriculum offers 13 Advanced Placement courses in science (AP Biology, AP Chemistry, AP Physics), mathematics (AP Calculus AB, AP Calculus BC, AP Statistics), social studies (AP Economics, AP United States History, AP United States Government and Politics, AP Human Geography), language arts (AP English Language and Composition, AP English Literature and Composition), and the visual/performing arts (AP Music Theory, AP Studio Art: Drawing). Northmont also provides several honors and College Credit Plus courses.

=== Ohio Academic Competition State Championships ===
- 2010, 2013, 2014, 2015, 2024, 2025

== Athletics ==
Northmont is a member of the Greater Western Ohio Conference (GWOC).

The school's mascot is the Thunderbolt, but its student populace are more colloquially known as the T-Bolts or just the Bolts. This moniker was unintentionally gained from a basketball commentator in the school system's early years (circa 1960s), who, while watching the high school boys' team racing back and forth across the court, exclaimed that they were zipping back and forth like "thunderbolts."

=== Ohio High School Athletic Association State Championships ===
- Boys' Soccer – 1978, 1988
- Boys' Cross Country – 1995, 1996
- Girls' Soccer – 1985, 1987, 1988, 1989

== New building ==
A 5.9 mills levy was placed on the November 8, 2011 ballot to construct a new early learning center and new high school, as well as making improvements to the other buildings in the district. It passed with a 53% yes vote. Construction on the new building began in late 2012 with the relocation of the tennis courts, softball diamonds, and band rehearsal field. The only part of the current building that remained is the school's auditorium, constructed in 1987, which was brought up to code with the new building. Construction was completed and opened to students January 11, 2016.

== Marching Band ==
The Northmont Marching Band has previously been a finalist at the Bands of America Grand National Championships and received Grand-Champions for the MSBA Championships in 2009, 2010, and 2012 in the AAAA Division.

Previous head band directors were Willis R. Cool, Reginald Richwine (1981–2006), David Armbruster (2006–2009), Jim Blankenship (2009–2013), and Andrew Brough (2013–2016).

The head band director is Brian Wissman (2016–Present)

== Notable alumni ==
- Blake Beemer (head coach for Butler Bulldogs)
- Chris Bell (former offensive tackle in the National Football League)
- Kurt Coleman (Former safety in the National Football League)
- Kenny Hayes (professional basketball player)
- Ronald Hawley (former basketball player for Louisville Cardinals 1961-1964)
- Chris Hero (professional wrestler)
- Jestin Jacobs (linebacker for the Oregon Ducks)
- Troy Mangen (professional football player)
- Rod Moore (Defensive back for the Michigan Wolverines)
- Esosa Osa (former Senior Advisor to Stacey Abrams' campaign).
- Zebrie Sanders (Former Offensive tackle in the National Football League)
- Kyle Segebart (assistant coach for Central Arkansas Bears)
- John Seibel (former ESPN anchor)
- Andy Trick (Bass player for The Devil Wears Prada)
