= Northmont City School District =

School district in Ohio, United States

Address
- 1150 West National Road Englewood, Ohio, 45315; United States

District information
- Type: Public
- Grades: PK–12
- Schools: 9
- NCES District ID: 3904872

Students and staff
- Students: 4,676 (2024–2025)
- Teachers: 266.30 (on an FTE basis) (2024–2025)
- Staff: 533.05 (on an FTE basis) (2024–2025)
- Student–teacher ratio: 17.56 (2024–2025)

Other information
- Website: www.northmontschools.net

The Northmont City School District is a school district in the U.S. state of Ohio that serves the areas of Clayton, Englewood, Union, Clay Township, and Philipsburg.

Northmont City School District was created by the Consolidation of Philipsburg, Randolph, and Clayton School districts in 1959.

Most of the district is in Montgomery County. A portion is in Miami County, and another portion is in Darke County.

== Schools ==
School Buildings:
School:	Address:	Grade Level:	Years:
Northmont High School	4916 West National Road Clayton, OH 45315	9-12	2016-
Northmont Middle School	4810 West National Road Clayton, OH 45315	7-8	1968-
Englewood Hills Elementary School	508 Durst Dr., Englewood, OH 45322	2-6	1965-
Northmoor Elementary School	4421 Old Salem Rd., Englewood, OH 45322	2-6	1965-
Northwood Elementary School	6200 Noranda Dr., Dayton, OH 45415	2-6	1969-
Union Elementary School	418 W. Martindale Rd., Union, OH 45322	2-6	1963-
Kleptz Early Learning Center	1100 National Road Englewood, OH 45322	K-1	2014-

=== Former schools ===
- Old Northmont High School, formerly located on property of current high school.
- O.R. Edgington Elementary School, formerly known as Randolph High School, Northmont Jr. High, and Randolph Elementary.
- Phillipsburg Elementary School, formerly known as Phillipsburg School.
- Clayton Elementary School, formerly known as Clayton School.
- Englewood Elementary School, Closed in 2023.

== See also ==
- List of school districts in Ohio
