= 1970 Baseball Hall of Fame balloting =

Elections to the Baseball Hall of Fame

National Baseball

Hall of Fame and Museum
- New inductees: 4
- via BBWAA: 1
- via Veterans Committee: 3
- Total inductees: 118
- Induction date: July 27, 1970

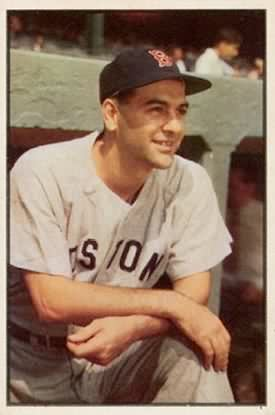
1970 BBWAA inductee Lou Boudreau

Elections to the Baseball Hall of Fame for 1970 followed the system of annual elections in place since 1968. The Baseball Writers' Association of America (BBWAA) voted by mail to select from recent major league players and elected Lou Boudreau. The Veterans Committee met in closed sessions to consider executives, managers, umpires, and earlier major league players. It selected three people: Earle Combs, Ford Frick, and Jesse Haines. A formal induction ceremony was held in Cooperstown, New York, on July 27, 1970, with Commissioner of Baseball Bowie Kuhn presiding.

== BBWAA election ==
The BBWAA was authorized to elect players active in 1950 or later, but not after 1964; the ballot included candidates from the 1969 ballot along with selected players, chosen by a screening committee, whose last appearance was in 1964. All 10-year members of the BBWAA were eligible to vote.

Voters were instructed to cast votes for up to 10 candidates; any candidate receiving votes on at least 75% of the ballots would be honored with induction to the Hall. The ballot consisted of 46 players; a total of 300 ballots were cast, with 225 votes required for election. A total of 2,302 individual votes were cast, an average of 7.67 per ballot.

Candidates who were eligible for the first time are indicated here with a dagger (†). The one candidate who received at least 75% of the vote and was elected is indicated in bold italics; candidates who have since been elected in subsequent elections are indicated in italics.

Joe Gordon, Tommy Henrich and Bucky Walters were on the ballot for the final time.

Player	Votes	Percent	Change
**Lou Boudreau**	232	77.3	▲13.2%
Ralph Kiner	167	55.7	▲15.4%
Gil Hodges	145	48.3	▲24.2%
Early Wynn	140	46.7	▲18.8%
Enos Slaughter	133	44.3	▲6.7%
Johnny Mize	126	42.0	▲7.9%
Marty Marion	120	40.0	▲7.1%
Pee Wee Reese	97	32.3	▲6.1%
Red Schoendienst	97	32.3	▲13.2%
George Kell	90	30.0	▲12.4%
Allie Reynolds	89	29.7	▲0.9%
Johnny Vander Meer	88	29.3	▲1.4%
Hal Newhouser	80	26.7	▲2.6%
Joe Gordon	79	26.3	▼2.2%
Phil Rizzuto	79	26.3	▲3.4%
Bobby Doerr	75	25.0	▲6.8%
Bob Lemon	75	25.0	▲8.5%
Tommy Henrich	62	20.7	▲6.0%
Alvin Dark	55	18.3	▲4.2%
Phil Cavarretta	51	17.0	▲6.1%
Duke Snider†	51	17.0	-
Bucky Walters	29	9.7	▲3.8%
Dom DiMaggio	15	5.0	▲1.2%
Ewell Blackwell	14	4.7	▲1.5%
Bobo Newsom	12	4.0	▼5.4%
Richie Ashburn	11	3.7	▲0.8%
Mickey Vernon	10	3.3	▼2.9%
Walker Cooper	9	3.0	▲1.5%
Johnny Sain	9	3.0	▲0.6%
Ted Kluszewski	8	2.7	▼0.5%
Charlie Keller	7	2.3	▼1.8%
Bobby Shantz†	7	2.3	-
Dutch Leonard	5	1.7	▲0.5%
Wally Moses	5	1.7	▲0.5%
Don Newcombe	5	1.7	▲0.8%
Billy Pierce†	5	1.7	-
Bobby Thomson	4	1.3	▼0.5%
Harry Brecheen	3	1.0	▲0.4%
Augie Galan	3	1.0	-
Carl Erskine	2	0.7	▼0.9%
Carl Furillo	2	0.7	-
Vic Wertz†	2	0.7	-
Jackie Jensen	1	0.3	-
Ed Lopat	1	0.3	▼0.3%
Gil McDougald	1	0.3	▼0.6%
Preacher Roe	1	0.3	-

Key to colors
Elected to the Hall. These individuals are also indicated in **bold italics**.
Players who were elected in future elections. These individuals are also indicated in plain italics.
Players not yet elected who returned on the 1971 ballot.
Eliminated from future BBWAA voting. These individuals remain eligible for future Veterans Committee consideration.

Players eligible for the first time who were not included on the ballot were: Gus Bell, Hal Brown, Bud Daley, Hank Foiles, Paul Foytack, Don Hoak, Sam Jones, Charlie Maxwell, Cal McLish, Bubba Phillips, Wally Post, Pete Runnels, Al Smith, Hal Smith, Gene Stephens, Tom Sturdivant, Johnny Temple, Lee Walls and Dick Williams (who would eventually be inducted into the Hall of Fame as a manager in 2008).

== J. G. Taylor Spink Award ==
Sid Mercer (1880–1945) received the J. G. Taylor Spink Award honoring a baseball writer. The award was voted at the December 1969 meeting of the BBWAA, and included in the summer 1970 ceremonies.
