= 1971 Baseball Hall of Fame balloting =

Elections to the Baseball Hall of Fame

National Baseball

Hall of Fame and Museum
- New inductees: 8
- via Veterans Committee: 7
- via Negro Leagues Committee: 1
- Total inductees: 126
- Induction date: August 9, 1971

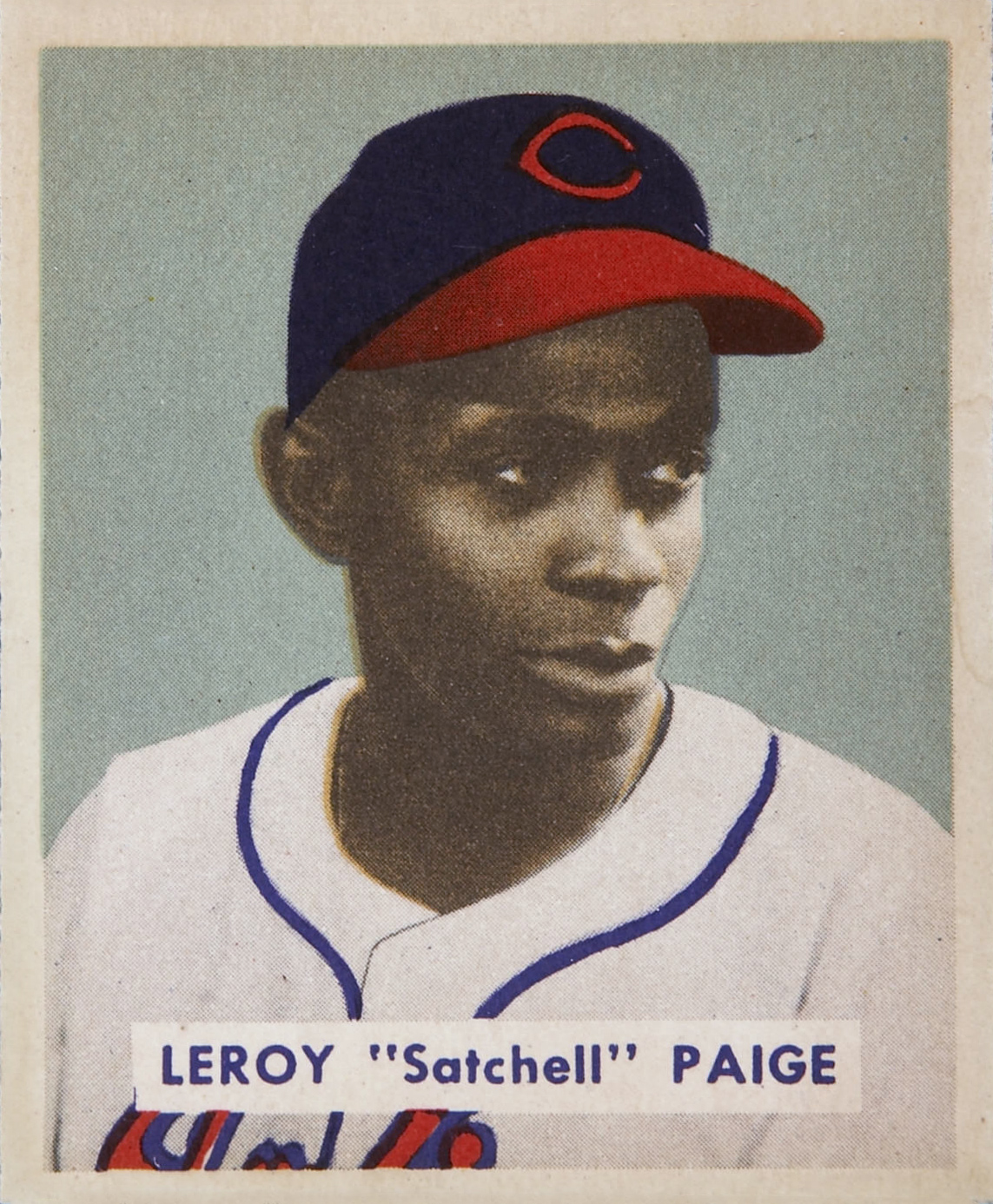
1971 inductee Satchel Paige

Elections to the Baseball Hall of Fame for 1971 featured a new committee on the Negro leagues that met in February and selected Satchel Paige, who spent most of his career in Negro league baseball before joining the Cleveland Indians in 1948, when he was over 40 years old. Controversy arose both over the selection of a pitcher with only 28 major-league victories (Negro league baseball statistics were not considered major-league statistics until 2020) and about the original plan not to include Negro league players in the main Hall of Fame. In July, officials announced that Paige and future Negro league selections would be included in the main Hall of Fame. Paige was honored alongside other Hall of Fame inductees in August.

Otherwise, the elections continued a system of annual elections in place since 1968. The Baseball Writers' Association of America (BBWAA) voted by mail to select from recent major league players and elected no one. The Veterans Committee met in closed-door sessions to select from executives, managers, umpires, and earlier major league players. It elected seven, the most in its 1953 to 2001 history: Dave Bancroft, Jake Beckley, Chick Hafey, Harry Hooper, Joe Kelley, Rube Marquard, and George Weiss. A formal induction ceremony was held in Cooperstown, New York, on August 9, 1971, with Commissioner of Baseball Bowie Kuhn presiding.

== BBWAA election ==
The BBWAA was empowered to vote for players who were active from 1951 to 1965, excluding those still playing after 1965. The ballot featured candidates from the 1970 ballot who received a minimum of 5% of the vote but were not elected, along with additional players selected by a screening committee whose careers ended in 1965. All BBWAA members with at least 10 years of membership were eligible to participate in the voting process.

Voters were instructed to cast votes for up to 10 candidates; any candidate receiving votes on at least 75% of the ballots would be honored with induction to the Hall. The ballot consisted of 48 players; a total of 360 ballots were cast, with 270 votes required for election. A total of 2,681 individual votes were cast, an average of 7.45 per ballot. Those candidates receiving less than 5% of the vote will not appear on future BBWAA ballots but may eventually be considered by the Veterans Committee.

Candidates who were eligible for the first time are indicated here with a dagger (†). Candidates who have since been elected in subsequent elections are indicated in italics.

Johnny Vander Meer and Bobby Doerr were on the ballot for the final time.

Player	Votes	Percent	Change
Yogi Berra†	242	67.2	-
Early Wynn	240	66.7	▲20.0%
Ralph Kiner	212	58.9	▲3.2%
Gil Hodges	180	50.0	▲1.7%
Enos Slaughter	165	45.8	▲1.5%
Johnny Mize	157	43.6	▲1.6%
Pee Wee Reese	127	35.3	▲3.0%
Marty Marion	123	34.2	▼5.8%
Red Schoendienst	123	34.3	▲2.0%
Allie Reynolds	110	30.6	▲0.9%
George Kell	105	29.2	▼0.8%
Johnny Vander Meer	98	27.2	▼2.1%
Hal Newhouser	94	26.1	▼0.6%
Phil Rizzuto	92	25.6	▼0.7%
Bob Lemon	90	25.0	-
Duke Snider	89	24.7	▲7.7%
Phil Cavarretta	83	23.1	▲6.1%
Bobby Doerr	78	21.7	▼3.3%
Alvin Dark	54	15.0	▼3.3%
Nellie Fox†	39	10.8	-
Bobo Newsom	17	4.7	▲0.7%
Dom DiMaggio	15	4.2	▼0.8%
Charlie Keller	14	3.9	▲1.6%
Mickey Vernon	12	3.3	-
Johnny Sain	11	3.1	▲0.1%
Richie Ashburn	10	2.8	▼0.9%
Harvey Haddix†	10	2.8	-
Ted Kluszewski	9	2.5	▼0.2%
Don Newcombe	8	2.2	▲0.5%
Harry Brecheen	7	1.9	▲0.9%
Walker Cooper	7	1.9	▼1.1%
Wally Moses	7	1.9	▲0.2%
Billy Pierce	7	1.9	▲0.2%
Carl Furillo	5	1.4	▲0.7%
Bobby Shantz	5	1.4	▼0.9%
Ed Lopat	4	1.1	▲0.8%
Gil McDougald	4	1.1	▲0.8%
Roy Sievers†	4	1.1	-
Bobby Thomson	4	1.1	▼0.2%
Carl Erskine	3	0.8	▲0.1%
Dutch Leonard	3	0.8	▼0.9%
Preacher Roe	3	0.8	▲0.5%
Jackie Jensen	2	0.6	▲0.3%
Wally Moon†	2	0.6	-
Vic Power†	2	0.6	-
Vic Raschi	2	0.6	-
Vic Wertz	2	0.6	▼0.1%
Bill Bruton†	1	0.3	-

Key to colors
Players who were elected in future elections. These individuals are also indicated in plain italics.
Players not yet elected who returned on the 1972 ballot.
Eliminated from future BBWAA voting. These individuals remain eligible for future Veterans Committee consideration.

The field of newly eligible players included 13 All Stars, 7 of whom were not included on the ballot, representing a total of 70 All Star selections. The new class included 18-time All-Star Yogi Berra, 15-time All-Star Nellie Fox, 6-time All-Star Vic Power, and 5-time All-Stars Dick Donovan and Roy Sievers.

Players eligible for the first time who were not included on the ballot were: Frank Baumann, Gino Cimoli, Dick Donovan, Ryne Duren, Gordon Jones, Frank Lary, Don Mossi, Gus Triandos and Don Zimmer.

== J. G. Taylor Spink Award ==
Heywood Broun (1888–1939) received the J. G. Taylor Spink Award honoring a baseball writer. The award was voted at the December 1970 meeting of the BBWAA, and included in the summer 1971 ceremonies.
