= Union, Ohio =

- City
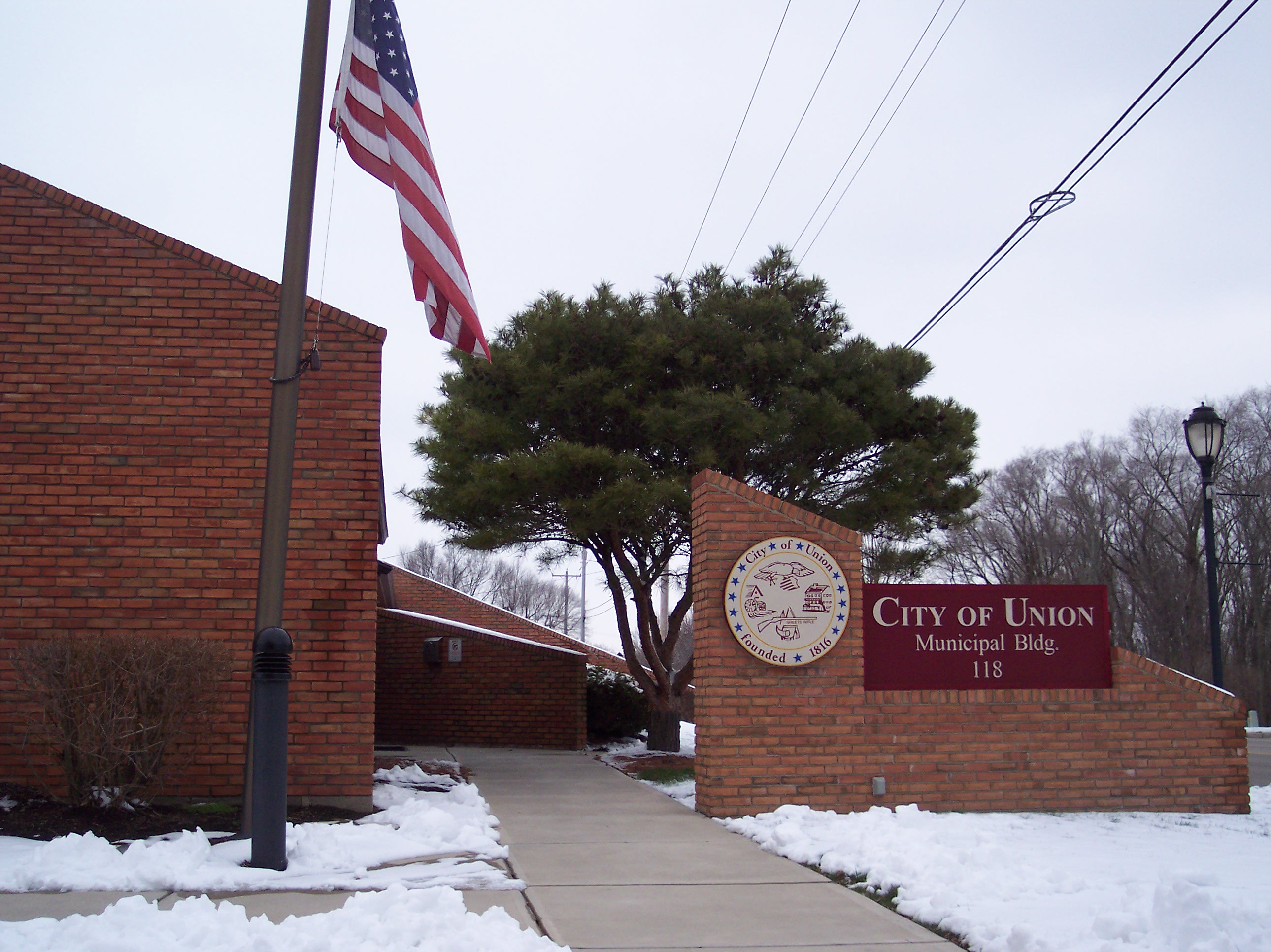
- Union Municipal Building

- Seal
- Interactive map of Union, Ohio
- Location within Ohio Location within the United States
- Coordinates: 39°54′43″N 84°15′25″W
- Country: United States
- State: Ohio
- Counties: Montgomery, Miami
- Founded: 1806
- Named: "Union" in 1816
- Incorporated: 1982 (as city)

Government
  - Mayor: Michael O'Callaghan

Area
  - Total: 8.37 sq mi (21.69 km^{2})
  - Land: 8.30 sq mi (21.50 km^{2})
  - Water: 0.077 sq mi (0.20 km^{2})
- Elevation: 817 ft (249 m)

Population (2020)
  - Total: 6,859
  - Density: 826.4/sq mi (319.06/km^{2})
- Time zone: UTC-5 (EST)
  - Summer (DST): UTC-4 (EDT)
- ZIP code: 45322 and 45377
- Area codes: 937, 326
- FIPS code: 39-78470
- GNIS feature ID: 2397084
- Website: https://www.unionoh.org/

Union is a city in Montgomery and Miami counties in the U.S. state of Ohio. The population was 6,859 at the 2020 census. It is part of the Dayton metropolitan area.

== Geography ==
According to the United States Census Bureau, the city has a total area of 8.602 square miles (22.28 km^{2}), of which 8.522 square miles (22.07 km^{2}) is land and 0.08 square miles (0.21 km^{2}) is water. The Stillwater River runs on its east side.

Ironically, Union lies west of West Union, Ohio, the county seat of Adams County approximately 60 miles east of Cincinnati. Union and West Union are not adjacent to each other, actually being approximately 120 miles from each other.

=== Transportation ===
One major state highway, State Route 48, runs through Union. In Union, State Route 48 is known as Main Street. Union is 4 miles north of Interstate 70.

== Government ==
Union is a charter city and has a mayor/council/manager form of government. The current mayor is Michael O'Callaghan, and John P. Applegate is Union's city manager.

== Demographics ==
Historical population
Census	Pop.	Note	%±
1880	224		—
1930	263		—
1940	280		6.5%
1950	370		32.1%
1960	1,072		189.7%
1970	3,654		240.9%
1980	5,219		42.8%
1990	5,501		5.4%
2000	5,574		1.3%
2010	6,419		15.2%
2020	6,859		6.9%
2025 (est.)	7,177		4.6%

=== 2020 census ===
As of the 2020 census, Union had a population of 6,859. The median age was 39.3 years, 23.3% of residents were under the age of 18, and 18.0% were 65 years of age or older. For every 100 females there were 95.0 males, and for every 100 females age 18 and over there were 90.8 males age 18 and over.

90.4% of residents lived in urban areas, while 9.6% lived in rural areas.

There were 2,774 households in Union, of which 32.7% had children under the age of 18 living in them. Of all households, 51.3% were married-couple households, 15.2% had a male householder with no spouse or partner present, and 25.1% had a female householder with no spouse or partner present. About 25.1% of all households were made up of individuals and 11.5% had someone living alone who was 65 years of age or older.

There were 2,877 housing units, of which 3.6% were vacant. The homeowner vacancy rate was 1.1% and the rental vacancy rate was 2.9%.

Racial composition as of the 2020 census
Race	Number	Percent
White	5,963	86.9%
Black or African American	348	5.1%
American Indian and Alaska Native	19	0.3%
Asian	62	0.9%
Native Hawaiian and Other Pacific Islander	2	0.0%
Some other race	40	0.6%
Two or more races	425	6.2%
Hispanic or Latino (of any race)	159	2.3%

=== 2010 census ===
As of the census of 2010, there were 6,419 people, 2,554 households, and 1,811 families living in the city. The population density was 910.5 inhabitants per square mile (351.5/km^{2}). There were 2,721 housing units at an average density of 386.0 per square mile (149.0/km^{2}). The racial makeup of the city was 93.5% White, 3.6% African American, 0.2% Native American, 0.7% Asian, 0.2% from other races, and 1.8% from two or more races. Hispanic or Latino of any race were 1.6% of the population.

There were 2,554 households, of which 35.0% had children under the age of 18 living with them, 54.9% were married couples living together, 12.0% had a female householder with no husband present, 4.0% had a male householder with no wife present, and 29.1% were non-families. 24.3% of all households were made up of individuals, and 9.2% had someone living alone who was 65 years of age or older. The average household size was 2.51 and the average family size was 2.99.

The median age in the city was 38.6 years. 25.5% of residents were under the age of 18; 6.8% were between the ages of 18 and 24; 26.8% were from 25 to 44; 28.1% were from 45 to 64; and 12.8% were 65 years of age or older. The gender makeup of the city was 48.1% male and 51.9% female.

=== 2000 census ===
As of the census of 2000, there were 5,574 people, 2,080 households, and 1,609 families living in the city. The population density was 1,302.0 inhabitants per square mile (502.7/km^{2}). There were 2,167 housing units at an average density of 506.2 per square mile (195.4/km^{2}). The racial makeup of the city was 96.88% White, 0.91% African American, 0.14% Native American, 0.36% Asian, 0.02% Pacific Islander, 0.36% from other races, and 1.33% from two or more races. Hispanic or Latino of any race were 1.18% of the population.

There were 2,080 households, out of which 40.1% had children under the age of 18 living with them, 61.1% were married couples living together, 11.8% had a female householder with no husband present, and 22.6% were non-families. 18.9% of all households were made up of individuals, and 5.6% had someone living alone who was 65 years of age or older. The average household size was 2.68 and the average family size was 3.05.

In the city the population was spread out, with 28.7% under the age of 18, 7.6% from 18 to 24, 33.2% from 25 to 44, 22.6% from 45 to 64, and 7.9% who were 65 years of age or older. The median age was 34 years. For every 100 females, there were 92.9 males. For every 100 females age 18 and over, there were 91.6 males.

The median income for a household in the city was $50,471, and the median income for a family was $55,139. Males had a median income of $39,944 versus $25,430 for females. The per capita income for the city was $21,260. About 2.5% of families and 3.7% of the population were below the poverty line, including 3.5% of those under age 18 and 3.5% of those age 65 or over.

== Education ==
Union residents in Montgomery County west of the Stillwater River are served by the Northmont City School District. The schools that Union children attend include:

- Northmont High School
- Northmont Middle School
- Union Elementary

East of the Stillwater River, in Montgomery County, students attend Vandalia-Butler City School District.

Portions in Miami County in Milton-Union Exempted Village School District. The comprehensive high school of that district is Milton-Union High School.

== Notable people ==
- Bernie Babcock, author
- Wilma Leona Jackson, third director of the United States Navy Nurse Corps
- John McDougal, politician in California
