= Clayton, Ohio =

- City
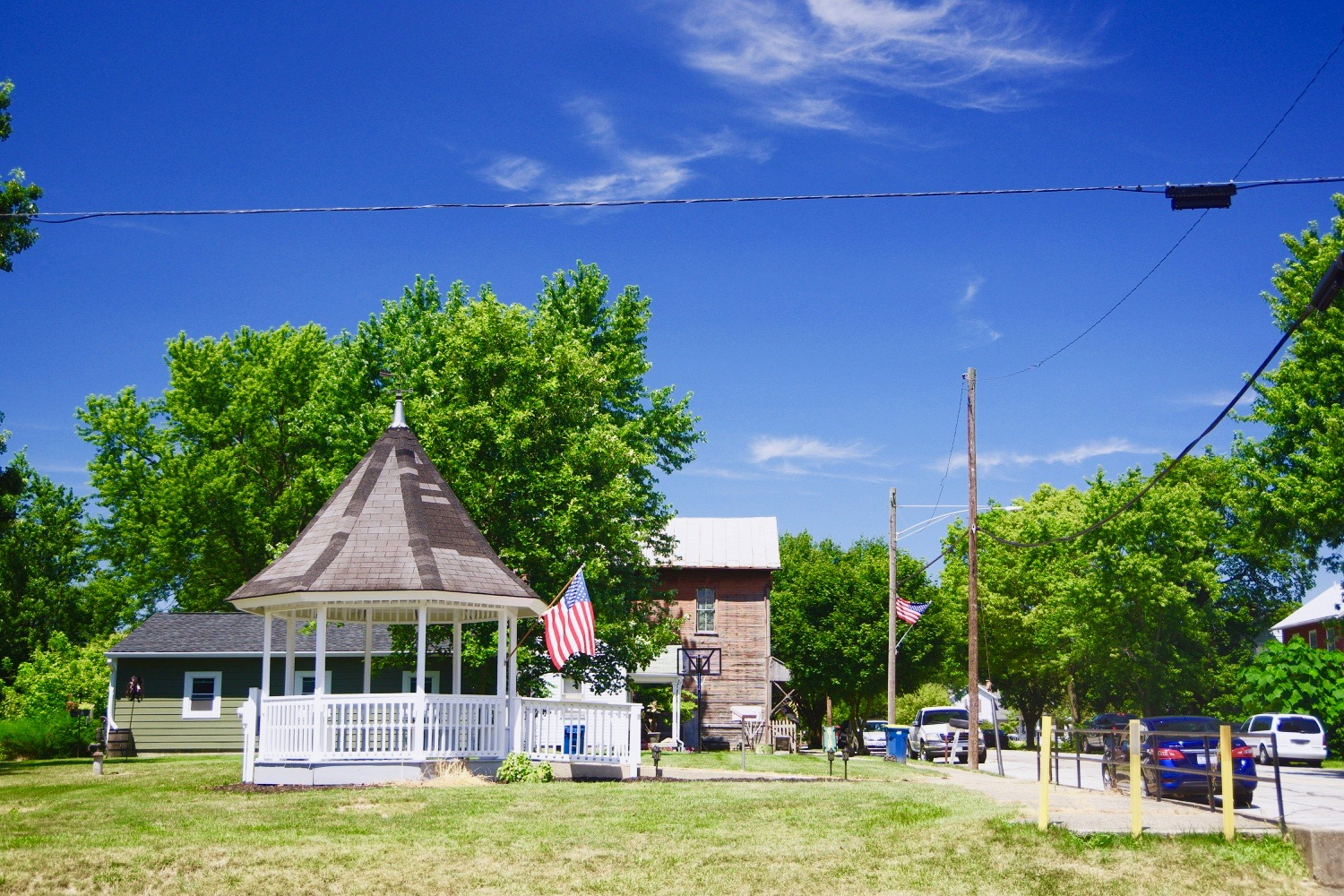
- Talmadge Road
- Motto: "The Learning Community"
- Interactive map of Clayton, Ohio
- Location within Ohio Location within the United States
- Coordinates: 39°52′08″N 84°19′45″W
- Country: United States
- State: Ohio
- Counties: Montgomery

Government
  - Mayor: Ryan Farmer

Area
  - Total: 18.58 sq mi (48.13 km^{2})
  - Land: 18.51 sq mi (47.95 km^{2})
  - Water: 0.069 sq mi (0.18 km^{2})
- Elevation: 955 ft (291 m)

Population (2020)
  - Total: 13,310
  - Estimate (2023): 13,222
  - Density: 719/sq mi (277.6/km^{2})
- Time zone: UTC-5 (Eastern (EST))
  - Summer (DST): UTC-4 (EDT)
- ZIP Code: 45315
- Area codes: 937, 326
- FIPS code: 39-15644
- GNIS feature ID: 2397639
- Website: http://www.clayton.oh.us/

Clayton is a city in Montgomery County, Ohio, United States. The population was 13,310 at the 2020 census. A suburb of Dayton, it is part of the Dayton metropolitan area.

The city was named after John Clayton, a War of 1812 veteran.

== Geography ==
According to the United States Census Bureau, the city has a total area of 18.60 square miles (48.17 km^{2}), of which 18.51 square miles (47.94 km^{2}) is land and 0.09 square miles (0.23 km^{2}) is water.

In 1998, Clayton annexed the remainder of Montgomery County's Randolph Township.

== History ==
Clayton was platted in 1816 and at that time was known as Salem. It suffered when the National Road bypassed it. In 1906 it became a stop on the Dayton Northern Traction Line. It became a city in 1998 through merger with the rest of Randolph Township, Montgomery County, Ohio.

== Demographics ==
Historical population
Census	Pop.	Note	%±
1950	466		—
1960	550		18.0%
1970	773		40.5%
1980	752		−2.7%
1990	713		−5.2%
2000	13,347		1,771.9%
2010	13,209		−1.0%
2020	13,310		0.8%
2023 (est.)	13,222		−0.7%

=== 2020 census ===
As of the 2020 census, Clayton had a population of 13,310. The median age was 44.3 years. 21.5% of residents were under the age of 18 and 20.5% of residents were 65 years of age or older. For every 100 females there were 94.6 males, and for every 100 females age 18 and over there were 92.3 males age 18 and over.

90.7% of residents lived in urban areas, while 9.3% lived in rural areas.

There were 5,273 households in Clayton, of which 29.2% had children under the age of 18 living in them. Of all households, 54.7% were married-couple households, 15.1% were households with a male householder and no spouse or partner present, and 24.5% were households with a female householder and no spouse or partner present. About 23.8% of all households were made up of individuals and 11.8% had someone living alone who was 65 years of age or older.

There were 5,490 housing units, of which 4.0% were vacant. Among occupied housing units, 82.0% were owner-occupied and 18.0% were renter-occupied. The homeowner vacancy rate was 1.3% and the rental vacancy rate was 3.5%.

Racial composition as of the 2020 census
Race	Number	Percent
White	8,963	67.3%
Black or African American	3,119	23.4%
American Indian and Alaska Native	26	0.2%
Asian	222	1.7%
Native Hawaiian and Other Pacific Islander	0	0%
Some other race	150	1.1%
Two or more races	830	6.2%
Hispanic or Latino (of any race)	291	2.2%

=== 2010 census ===
As of the census of 2010, there were 13,209 people, 5,118 households, and 3,766 families living in the city. The population density was 713.6 inhabitants per square mile (275.5/km^{2}). There were 5,423 housing units at an average density of 293.0 per square mile (113.1/km^{2}). The racial makeup of the city was 76.5% White, 18.8% African American, 0.2% Native American, 1.4% Asian, 0.6% from other races, and 2.5% from two or more races. Hispanic or Latino of any race were 1.4% of the population.

There were 5,118 households, of which 32.1% had children under the age of 18 living with them, 59.2% were married couples living together, 10.7% had a female householder with no husband present, 3.6% had a male householder with no wife present, and 26.4% were non-families. Of all households, 22.7% were made up of individuals, and 7.8% had someone living alone who was 65 years of age or older. The average household size was 2.56 and the average family size was 3.00.

The median age in the city was 42.6 years. 23.4% of residents were under the age of 18; 7.6% were between the ages of 18 and 24; 22.3% were from 25 to 44; 32.7% were from 45 to 64; and 14% were 65 years of age or older. The gender makeup of the city was 49.0% male and 51.0% female.

=== 2000 census ===
As of the census of 2000, there were 13,347 people, 4,975 households, and 3,850 families living in the city. The population density was 723.7 inhabitants per square mile (279.4/km^{2}). There were 5,193 housing units at an average density of 281.6 per square mile (108.7/km^{2}). The racial makeup of the city was 87.14% White, 9.87% African American, 0.15% Native American, 1.45% Asian, 0.04% Pacific Islander, 0.30% from other races, and 1.03% from two or more races. Hispanic or Latino of any race were 0.90% of the population.

There were 4,975 households, out of which 35.7% had children under the age of 18 living with them, 65.4% were married couples living together, 8.6% had a female householder with no husband present, and 22.6% were non-families. Of all households, 19.2% were made up of individuals, and 6.5% had someone living alone who was 65 years of age or older. The average household size was 2.66 and the average family size was 3.05.

In the city the population was spread out, with 26.9% under the age of 18, 6.7% from 18 to 24, 27.2% from 25 to 44, 28.0% from 45 to 64, and 11.2% who were 65 years of age or older. The median age was 39 years. For every 100 females, there were 97.9 males. For every 100 females age 18 and over, there were 94.7 males.

The median income for a household in the city was $60,625, and the median income for a family was $67,250. Males had a median income of $45,569 versus $29,261 for females. The per capita income for the city was $26,569. About 3.3% of families and 4.4% of the population were below the poverty line, including 5.9% of those under age 18 and 2.8% of those age 65 or over.

== Education ==
Clayton is served by Montgomery County's Northmont City School District, which operates the following schools:

- Northmont High School
- Northmont Middle School
- Englewood Elementary
- Englewood Hills Elementary
- Northmoor Elementary
- Northwood Elementary
- Union Elementary
- Kleptz Early Learning Center

== Notable people ==
- Jesse "Pop" Haines – member of the Baseball Hall of Fame
- Chris Hero – professional wrestler, ROH tag team champion Ring of Honor
- Johnnie Wilder, Jr. – former lead singer of the funk group Heatwave.
- Joseph G. LaPointe Jr. - combat medic in the United States Army, posthumously received Medal of Honor

== In fiction ==
Part of Ayn Rand's novel The Fountainhead is set in Clayton.
