= 2026 Bowling Green Falcons football team =

American college football season

2026 Bowling Green Falcons football
- Conference: Mid-American Conference
- Record: 3–8 (3–4 MAC)
- Head coach: Eddie George (2nd season)
- Offensive coordinator: Greg Nosal (5th season)
- Offensive scheme: Power spread
- Defensive coordinator: Joe Bowden (1st season)
- Base defense: Multiple 4–2–5
- Home stadium: Doyt Perry Stadium

2026 Mid-American Conference football standings
	Conf.			Overall
Team	W		L	W		L
Ohio	6	–	1	8	–	3
Western Michigan	6	–	1	8	–	3
Buffalo	6	–	1	8	–	3
Toledo	6	–	1	9	–	2
Miami (OH)	5	–	2	7	–	4
Central Michigan	3	–	4	5	–	6
Eastern Michigan	3	–	4	4	–	7
Bowling Green	3	–	4	3	–	8
UMass	2	–	5	5	–	6
Kent State	2	–	5	3	–	8
Ball State	2	–	5	3	–	8
Akron	1	–	6	2	–	9
Sacramento State	1	–	7	2	–	9
Championship: December 5, 2026
As of November 21, 2026; Rankings from AP poll

The 2026 Bowling Green Falcons football team represents Bowling Green State University in the Mid-American Conference during the 2026 NCAA Division I FBS football season. They are led by led by second-year head coach Eddie George and play home games at Doyt Perry Stadium, in Bowling Green, Ohio.

== Schedule ==
Date	Time	Opponent	Site	TV	Result	Attendance
September 5	12:00 p.m.	No. 5 (FCS) Tarleton State*	Doyt Perry Stadium; Bowling Green, OH	ESPN+	L 13–20	13,367
September 12	7:00 p.m.	at Nebraska*	Lincoln, NE; Cincinnati, OH	FS1	L 7–56	86,193
September 19	12:00 p.m.	at Iowa State*	Jack Trice Stadium; Ames, IA	ESPNU	L 7–55	50,395
September 26	5:00 p.m.	South Florida*^{†}	Doyt Perry Stadium; Bowling Green, OH	ESPN+	L 6–14	22,265
October 3	3:30 p.m.	at Miami (OH)	Yager Stadium; Oxford, OH	ESPN+	W 24–20	12,474
October 10	12:00 p.m.	Sacramento State	Doyt Perry Stadium; Bowling Green, OH	ESPN+	W 38–10	12,559
October 17	12:00 p.m.	Ball State	Doyt Perry Stadium; Bowling Green, OH	ESPN+	L 31–32 ^{OT}	19,875
October 24	3:30 p.m.	at Buffalo	Broadview Stadium; Amherst, NY	ESPN+	L 24–31	5,988
October 31	12:00 p.m.	at Western Michigan	Waldo Stadium; Kalamazoo, MI	CBSSN	L 10–23	20,179
November 10	7:00 p.m.	Kent State	Doyt Perry Stadium; Bowling Green, OH (Anniversary Award)	ESPNU	W 33–28	10,254
November 20	7:30 p.m.	at Toledo	Glass Bowl; Toledo, OH (Battle of I-75)	ESPN2	L 0–19	29,216
November 28	3:30 p.m.	UMass	Doyt Perry Stadium; Bowling Green, OH	ESPN+		
*Non-conference game; ^{†}Homecoming; Rankings from AP Poll and CFP Rankings released prior to game; All times are in Eastern time

== Offseason ==
=== 2026 NFL draft ===
The Falcons did not have any players selected in the NFL Draft, though several received invitations to NFL rookie mini-camps following the draft. Offensive tackle Tunde Fatukasi received invitations from the Kansas City Chiefs and Buffalo Bills. Wide receiver Finn Hogan received invitations from the Tampa Bay Buccaneers and Tennessee Titans, while tight end Jyrin Johnson received an invitation from the Cleveland Browns.

Former Falcons who transferred prior to the 2025 season were also selected in the draft. Defensive end Cashius Howell was selected by the Cincinnati Bengals in the second round with the 41st overall pick, while defensive back Jalen Huskey was selected by the Jacksonville Jaguars in the third round with the 100th overall pick.

=== Spring practice ===
The Falcons began spring practice on March 10, 2026, and concluded with their annual Spring Game on April 11.

=== Transfers ===
==== Outgoing ====
The Falcons lost 33 players to the transfer portal. As of June 30, 2026, three players remain in the portal, while three players have withdrawn their names.

Bowling Green outgoing transfers
Name	Position	Height	Weight	Year	Hometown	New school
Collins Acheampong	DE	6'7"	270	(redshirt) Sophomore	Rancho Santa Margarita, CA	UTSA
David Afogho	DE	6'3"	245	(redshirt) Sophomore	West Roxbury, MA	West Virginia
Caden Marshall	LB	6'2"	200	(redshirt) Freshman	Paris, TN	SMU
Allen Middleton	WR	5'11"	180	Junior	Mascoutah, IL	Southern Illinois
Arlis Boardingham	TE	6'3"	250	(redshirt) Junior	Van Nuys, CA	Auburn
Ashton Yeager	DT	6'2"	280	(redshirt) Freshman	Findlay, OH	Ohio State
Caleb Goodloe	WR	6'1"	178	Sophomore	St. Petersburg, FL	North Dakota
Cameron Pettaway	RB	5'10"	167	(redshirt) Freshman	Farmington, MI	Iowa State
Chris Edmonds	RB	5'10"	200	(redshirt) Junior	Toledo, OH	Chicago State
Chris McMillian	RB	5'11"	210	Senior	Fort Valley, GA	North Alabama
Coleman Teasdale	LB	6'1"	190	(redshirt) Junior	Louisville, CO	Montana Tech
DeShaun Lanier	WR	5'11"	178	(redshirt) Freshman	Ferndale, MI	Grand Valley State
Gavin Harris	CB	6'1"	175	Freshman	High Point, NC	Campbell
Gideon Lampron	LB	6'0"	220	Senior	LaGrange, OH	Colorado
Ian van der Merwe	DT	6'1"	260	(redshirt) Senior	Tucson, AZ	Davenport
Isaiah Thomison	DL	6'3"	230	Junior	Fayetteville, TN	Illinois
Jace Henry	DB	6'0"	180	(redshirt) Junior	Pataskala, OH	Findlay
Jacob Harris	TE	6'4"	255	(redshirt) Junior	Westerville, OH	Wisconsin
Jahvion Jarmon	QB	5'11"	170	(redshirt) Freshman	Cincinnati, OH	Austin Peay
Jackson Kleather	K	5'10"	170	Junior	Tippecanoe, OH	Northwestern
Jay’Quan Bostic	S	6'2"	190	Sophomore	Cincinnati, OH	Delaware State
Justin Eklund	LB	6'3"	220	(redshirt) Junior	Folsom, CA	Montana
Kaderris Roberts	RB	5'8"	170	(redshirt) Senior	Maitland, FL	Delaware
Keyon Washington	CB	6'0"	175	(redshirt) Freshman	Waldorf, MD	Iowa State
Lucian Anderson III	QB	6'3"	190	Junior	Athens, GA	South Carolina
Malik Moses	DL	6'4"	270	Sophomore	Snellville, GA	Norfolk State
Mar'Kel Porter	RB	6'1"	220	Sophomore	Duncanville, TX	Northwestern
MJ Cannon	CB	6'0"	175	Sophomore	Cincinnati, OH	Cincinnati
Nate Pabst	OT	6'6"	315	Senior	Cincinnati, OH	Florida State
RJ Garcia II	WR	6'1"	170	Senior	Tampa, FL	FAU
Reis Stocksdale	WR	5'10"	188	Senior	Morrow, OH	Temple
TJ Nelson	S	6'1"	220	Sophomore	Cincinnati, OH	Lamar
Tyron Steed	DB	6'1"	160	(redshirt) Freshman	St. Louis , MO	Towson

==== Incoming ====
The Falcons added 21 players from the transfer portal.

Bowling Green incoming transfers
Name	Number	Position	Height	Weight	Year	Hometown	Previous school
John Baker IV	#56	DL	6'5"	220	(redshirt) Freshman	Clinton Township, MI	Toledo
Ke'Marion Baldwin	#4	RB	5'9"	200	Junior	St. Pauls, NC	Charleston Southern
Drey Braxton	#41	CB	5'10"	170	Junior	Highland Springs, VA	North Carolina Central
Selah Brown	#89	DL	6'2"	290	(redshirt) Senior	Louisville, KY	Louisville
Isaiah Dawson	#6	WR	5'8"	191	Sophomore	Garner, NC	Richmond
Sanders Ellis	#6	LB	6'2"	240	Junior	Nashville, TN	Purdue
Quinn Forsythe	#52	LS	6'2"	180	(redshirt) Freshman	Manhattan, IL	Benedictine
Gabe Funk	#65	OT	6'6"	305	(redshirt) Freshman	Xenia, OH	Appalachian State
Jonathan Goins	#50	LB	6'1"	225	Sophomore	Pine Bluff, AR	Alabama A&M
Armahn Hale	#11	DB	5'11"	195	Senior	Akron, OH	New Mexico State
JayT Jackson	#14	DB	6'1"	175	(redshirt) Senior	Columbus, GA	Louisiana Tech
Jay Kastantin	#15	QB	6'4"	215	Junior	Needham, MA	Assumption
Ryan Kingston	#30	P	6'6"	215	Senior	South Bend, IN	Southeast Missouri State
Kade Kostus	#4	DL	6'2"	260	(redshirt) Senior	Rockford, MI	Central Michigan
Austin Novosad	#16	QB	6'3"	205	(redshirt) Junior	Dripping Springs, TX	Oregon
Reddick Pillarelli	#87	WR	6'0"	185	Sophomore	Holland, OH	Ohio Wesleyan
Nick Sawyer	#18	CB	5'11"	175	Senior	Harvest, AL	Charleston Southern
Nick Sowell	#9	WR	6'6"	210	Junior	Irmo, SC	South Carolina State
Timothy Taylor Jr.	#55	DL	6'0"	280	(redshirt) Freshman	Starke, FL	Jacksonville State
Dom Woods	#23	WR	6'1"	175	(redshirt) Junior	Perrysburg, OH	Saginaw Valley State
Mike Wright III	#7	DB	5'10"	180	Junior	Palm Beach Gardens, FL	Florida Atlantic

=== Recruiting class ===
The Falcons added 26 players in their 2026 recruiting class. Tight end Kentrell White is the highest-rated recruit in program history, surpassing former quarterback James Morgan, who previously held the distinction as the highest-rated recruit in Bowling Green's 2015 recruiting class. White decommitted from Auburn on December 2, 2025, before committing to Bowling Green on January 13, 2026. The class included 14 players from the state of Ohio and was ranked as the top recruiting class in the Mid-American Conference by 247Sports and On3.com.

College recruiting (2026)
Name	Hometown	School	Height	Weight	Commit date
Kentrell White; TE	Atlanta, Georgia	Midtown High School	6 ft 3 in (1.91 m)	210 lb (95 kg)	Jan 13, 2026
Kentrell White; TE	Recruit ratings: Rivals: 247Sports: ESPN: (78)				
Jarin Mock; QB	Pickerington, Ohio	Pickerington High School North	6 ft 3 in (1.91 m)	200 lb (91 kg)	Jun 5, 2025
Jarin Mock; QB	Recruit ratings: Rivals: 247Sports: ESPN: (76)				
Chris Newell Jr. S	Cleveland, Ohio	Glenville High School	5 ft 10 in (1.78 m)	180 lb (82 kg)	Sep 11, 2025
Chris Newell Jr. S	Recruit ratings: Rivals: 247Sports: ESPN: (75)				
Travis Robertson; OL	West Bloomfield, Michigan	West Bloomfield High School	6 ft 6 in (1.98 m)	320 lb (150 kg)	Dec 3, 2025
Travis Robertson; OL	Recruit ratings: Rivals: 247Sports: ESPN: (75)				
Elijah Durham-Smith; EDGE	Pickerington, Ohio	Pickerington High School North	6 ft 2 in (1.88 m)	240 lb (110 kg)	Jun 15, 2025
Elijah Durham-Smith; EDGE	Recruit ratings: Rivals: 247Sports: ESPN: (75)				
Caden Carter; OLB	Stow, Ohio	Walsh Jesuit High School	6 ft 1 in (1.85 m)	215 lb (98 kg)	Jun 23, 2025
Caden Carter; OLB	Recruit ratings: Rivals: 247Sports: ESPN: (75)				
Kingston Seals; OLB	Shaker Heights, Ohio	Shaker Heights High School	6 ft 2 in (1.88 m)	205 lb (93 kg)	Jul 7, 2025
Kingston Seals; OLB	Recruit ratings: Rivals: 247Sports: ESPN: (75)				
Julian Holt; S	Jacksonville, Florida	Edward H. White High School	6 ft 1 in (1.85 m)	190 lb (86 kg)	Jun 17, 2025
Julian Holt; S	Recruit ratings: Rivals: 247Sports: ESPN: (74)				
Bryce Brewster; DE	Cincinnati, Ohio	Robert A. Taft High School	6 ft 3 in (1.91 m)	240 lb (110 kg)	Jun 24, 2025
Bryce Brewster; DE	Recruit ratings: Rivals: 247Sports: ESPN: (74)				
Derron Gray Jr. TE	Columbus, Ohio	Columbus Africentric High School	6 ft 4 in (1.93 m)	215 lb (98 kg)	Jun 25, 2025
Derron Gray Jr. TE	Recruit ratings: Rivals: 247Sports: ESPN: (74)				
Trent Taylor; TE	Perry, Ohio	Perry High School	6 ft 4 in (1.93 m)	230 lb (100 kg)	Jun 9, 2025
Trent Taylor; TE	Recruit ratings: Rivals: 247Sports: ESPN: (74)				
Pete Pendergest; OT	Hamilton, Ohio	Badin High School	6 ft 5 in (1.96 m)	260 lb (120 kg)	Aug 22, 2025
Pete Pendergest; OT	Recruit ratings: Rivals: 247Sports: ESPN: (73)				
Tristin Blackmon; RB	Prattville, Alabama	Prattville High School	6 ft 0 in (1.83 m)	210 lb (95 kg)	Aug 2, 2025
Tristin Blackmon; RB	Recruit ratings: Rivals: 247Sports: ESPN: (73)				
Cedarius Christian; CB	Lake Wales, Florida	Lake Wales High School	6 ft 0 in (1.83 m)	170 lb (77 kg)	Jun 16, 2025
Cedarius Christian; CB	Recruit ratings: Rivals: 247Sports: ESPN: (73)				
Maddux Murphy; OT	Saint Joseph, Michigan	St. Joseph High School	6 ft 5 in (1.96 m)	285 lb (129 kg)	Sep 17, 2025
Maddux Murphy; OT	Recruit ratings: Rivals: 247Sports: ESPN: (73)				
Kore Thomas; DT	Dallas, Texas	First Baptist Academy	6 ft 2 in (1.88 m)	320 lb (150 kg)	Jun 18, 2025
Kore Thomas; DT	Recruit ratings: Rivals: 247Sports: ESPN: (72)				
Pauly Sadler; WR	Cleveland, Ohio	Glenville High School	5 ft 11 in (1.80 m)	175 lb (79 kg)	Jul 4, 2025
Pauly Sadler; WR	Recruit ratings: Rivals: 247Sports:				
Cade Brooks; WR	Cross Plains, Tennessee	East Robertson High School	6 ft 0 in (1.83 m)	190 lb (86 kg)	Nov 6, 2025
Cade Brooks; WR	Recruit ratings: Rivals: 247Sports:				
Joseph Saffold; WR	Lakewood, Ohio	St. Edward High School	5 ft 11 in (1.80 m)	175 lb (79 kg)	Nov 23, 2025
Joseph Saffold; WR	Recruit ratings: Rivals: 247Sports:				
Maddox Hunstad; TE	Jacksonville, Florida	Beachside High School	6 ft 4 in (1.93 m)	205 lb (93 kg)	Aug 27, 2025
Maddox Hunstad; TE	Recruit ratings: Rivals: 247Sports:				
Isaiah Hayward; WR	Toledo, Ohio	Whitmer High School	6 ft 0 in (1.83 m)	170 lb (77 kg)	Jun 16, 2025
Isaiah Hayward; WR	Recruit ratings: Rivals: 247Sports:				
Samuel Dossous; DE	Massillon, Ohio	Washington High School	6 ft 3 in (1.91 m)	225 lb (102 kg)	Dec 2, 2025
Samuel Dossous; DE	Recruit ratings: Rivals: 247Sports:				
Darian Hawkins; DE	West Hills, California	Chaminade College Prep	6 ft 4 in (1.93 m)	225 lb (102 kg)	Jan 29, 2026
Darian Hawkins; DE	Recruit ratings: Rivals: 247Sports:				
Dylan Dreaksy; QB	Linden, Michigan	Linden High School	6 ft 3 in (1.91 m)	190 lb (86 kg)	Feb 1, 2026
Dylan Dreaksy; QB	Recruit ratings: Rivals: 247Sports:				
Marceles Carey; WR	Deland, Florida	Deland High School	5 ft 9 in (1.75 m)	170 lb (77 kg)	Feb 4, 2026
Marceles Carey; WR	Recruit ratings: Rivals: 247Sports:				
Trent Merrell; EDGE	Elyria, Ohio	Elyria Catholic High School	6 ft 3 in (1.91 m)	230 lb (100 kg)	Feb 1, 2026
Trent Merrell; EDGE	Recruit ratings: Rivals: 247Sports:				
Overall recruit ranking: 247Sports: 2 On3: 3
Note: In many cases, Scout, Rivals, 247Sports, On3, and ESPN may conflict in their listings of height and weight.; In these cases, the average was taken. ESPN grades are on a 100-point scale.; Sources: "2026 Bowling Green Football Commitment List". ESPN.; "2026 Team Ranking". Rivals.com.; "2026 Bowling Green Falcons football team". 247Sports.

== Game summaries ==
=== No. 5 (FCS) Tarleton State ===
No. 5 (FCS) Tarleton State Texans (1–0) at Bowling Green Falcons (0–0) – Game summary

Quarter	1	2	3	4	Total
No. 5 (FCS) Texans	7	10	0	3	20
Falcons	0	7	3	3	13

at Doyt Perry Stadium • Bowling Green, Ohio

- Date: September 5
- Game time: 12:00 p.m. EDT
- Game weather: Sunny • Temperature: 75 °F (24 °C) • Wind: SE at 4 miles per hour (6.4 km/h)
- Game attendance: 13,367
- Referee: Andrew Speciale
- TV announcers (ESPN+): Kelsie Kasper and Ryan Cavanaugh

Game information

First quarter

- TAR – Tanner Schmidt 24-yard pass from Kaden Anderson (Alejandro De La Poza kick), 9:39. Texans 7–0. Drive: 9 plays, 48 yards, 3:13.

Second quarter

- TAR – Alejandro De La Poza 23-yard field goal, 9:44. Texans 10–0. Drive: 10 plays, 74 yards, 3:39.
- TAR – Marquis Willis 7-yard pass from Kaden Anderson (Alejandro De La Poza kick), 2:31. Texans 17–0. Drive: 6 plays, 99 yards, 3:43.
- BGSU – Austyn Dendy 3-yard run (Travis Kenner kick), 1:03. Texans 17–7. Drive: 6 plays, 69 yards, 1:24.

Third quarter

- BGSU – Travis Kenner 40-yard field goal, 4:45. Texans 17–10. Drive: 13 plays, 62 yards, 8:09.

Fourth quarter

- TAR – Alejandro De La Poza 26-yard field goal, 14:52. Texans 20–10. Drive: 7 plays, 27 yards, 2:17.
- BGSU – Travis Kenner 35-yard field goal, 10:45. Texans 20–13. Drive: 8 plays, 48 yards, 4:02.

Statistics	TAR	BGSU
First downs	19	21
Plays–yards	57–464	67–366
Rushes–yards	33–258	37–104
Passing yards	206	262
Passing: comp–att–int	16–24–0	24–30–0
Turnovers	1	2
Time of possession	25:07	34:53

Team	Category	Player	Statistics
Tarleton State	Passing	Kaden Anderson	16/24, 206 yards, 2 TD
Tarleton State	Rushing	Tylan Hines	26 carries, 250 yards
Tarleton State	Receiving	B.J. Fleming	3 receptions, 57 yards
Bowling Green	Passing	Jay Kastantin	24/30, 262 yards
Bowling Green	Rushing	Austyn Dendy	15 carries, 60 yards, TD
Bowling Green	Receiving	Jeremiah Scoby	10 receptions, 102 yards

Bowling Green began its season by hosting No. 5 FCS opponent Tarleton State. The Texans were coming off a 12–2 season in 2025 in which they won a share of the United Athletic Conference championship, advanced to the FCS quarterfinals, and defeated Army 30–27 in double overtime for their second victory over an FBS opponent. It was the first meeting between the two schools. Tarleton State entered the game 1–0 after defeating Prairie View A&M 49–30 the previous week. The Texans featured two FBS transfer quarterbacks, with former Wyoming quarterback Kaden Anderson completing 15 of 21 passes for 224 yards and three touchdowns, while Braedyn Locke completed 5 of 6 passes for 50 yards and a touchdown. Tarleton State was also led by returning running back Tylan Hines, a former Hawaii transfer, who rushed for 184 yards and two touchdowns in the season opener. Just days before the season opener, Bowling Green head coach Eddie George named Assumption transfer quarterback Jay Kastantin the starter over Oregon transfer Austin Novosad.

Tarleton State led 17–7 at halftime behind two touchdown passes from Anderson, while Bowling Green's only score came in the final two minutes of the half on a touchdown run by Austyn Dendy. Trailing 20–13 in the final two minutes, Tarleton State fumbled at the Bowling Green seven-yard line, with JoJo Johnson recovering in the end zone. Kastantin then led the Falcons on a final drive that reached the Tarleton State 23-yard line. After two incompletions, Kastantin found Brennan Ridley at the eight-yard line, where he was stopped as time expired. Hines finished with a game-high 250 rushing yards on 26 carries, while Bowling Green rushed for a combined 104 yards on 37 carries and lost two fumbles. Kastantin completed 24 of 30 passes for 262 yards, while Jeremiah Scoby recorded a game-high 10 receptions for 102 yards.

=== at Nebraska ===
Bowling Green Falcons (0–1) at Nebraska Cornhuskers (1–0) – Game summary

Quarter	1	2	3	4	Total
Falcons	0	0	0	7	7
Cornhuskers	14	21	0	21	56

at Memorial Stadium • Lincoln, Nebraska

- Date: September 12
- Game time: 7:00 p.m. EDT / 6:00 p.m. CDT
- Game weather: Cloudy • Temperature: 70 °F (21 °C) • Wind: NE @ 6 mph
- Game attendance: 86,193
- Referee: Jason Nickleby
- TV announcers (FS1): Eric Collins and Spencer Tillman

Game information

First quarter

- (7:34) NEB – Jacory Barney Jr. 35-yard pass from Anthony Colandrea (Kyle Cunanan kick) (Drive: 9 plays, 59 yards, 04:19, Nebraska 7–0)
- (0:32) NEB – Kwazi Gilmer 12-yard pass from Anthony Colandrea (Kyle Cunanan kick) (Drive: 7 plays, 38 yards, 04:04, Nebraska 14–0)

Second quarter

- (8:36) NEB – Kwazi Gilmer 4-yard pass from Anthony Colandrea (Kyle Cunanan kick) (Drive: 9 plays, 77 yards, 04:45, Nebraska 21–0)
- (5:16) NEB – Jamal Rule 59-yard run (Kyle Cunanan kick) (Drive: 3 plays, 73 yards, 01:12, Nebraska 28–0)
- (1:54) NEB – Jacory Barney Jr. 32-yard pass from Anthony Colandrea (Kyle Cunanan kick) (Drive: 5 plays, 79 yards, 02:20, Nebraska 35–0)

Third quarter

- No scoring plays.

Fourth quarter

- (14:53) BGSU – Leo Kemp 19-yard pass from Jay Kastantin (Treyton Kenner kick) (Drive: 6 plays, 63 yards, 03:34, Nebraska 35-7)
- (10:30) NEB – Isaiah Mozee 7-yard run (Kyle Cunanan kick) (Drive: 9 plays, 60 yards, 04:15, Nebraska 42-7)
- (9:29) NEB – Derek Wacker 25-yard fumble return (Kyle Cunanan kick) (Nebraska 49-7)
- (1:18) NEB – Kwinten Ives 6-yard pass from TJ Lateef (Kyle Cunanan kick) (Drive: 12 plays, 79 yards, 05:39, Nebraska 56-7)

Statistics	BGSU	NEB
First downs	9	28
Plays–yards	48–169	66–546
Rushes–yards	32–85	34–264
Passing yards	84	282
Passing: comp–att–int	10–16–1	26–32–1
Turnovers	2	1
Time of possession	28:19	31:41

Team	Category	Player	Statistics
Bowling Green	Passing	Jay Kastantin	10/16, 84 yards, TD, INT
Bowling Green	Rushing	Nakai Amachree	13 carries, 53 yards
Bowling Green	Receiving	Leo Kemp	1 reception, 19 yards, TD
Nebraska	Passing	Anthony Colandrea	20/24, 222 yards, 4 TD, INT
Nebraska	Rushing	Jamal Rule	8 carries, 88 yards, TD
Nebraska	Receiving	Jacory Barney Jr.	8 receptions, 115 yards, 2 TD

Nebraska entered the game 1–0 following a 49–21 victory over fellow MAC opponent Ohio, although the Cornhuskers led only 14–13 at halftime. The game marked the first meeting between Bowling Green and Nebraska. Bowling Green intercepted Nebraska quarterback Anthony Colandrea on the Cornhuskers' opening series. Following a Falcons three-and-out, Nebraska scored on each of its next five possessions of the first half, including two touchdown passes apiece to Jacory Barney Jr. and Kwazi Gilmer and a 59-yard touchdown run by Jamal Rule. Nebraska outgained Bowling Green 369–46 in the first half and held an 18–2 advantage in first downs. Nebraska led 35–0 at halftime.

After a scoreless third quarter, Bowling Green's lone highlight came during a six-play, 63-yard drive when quarterback Jay Kestantin connected with fullback Leo Kemp on a 19-yard touchdown pass. Kemp evaded multiple defenders and stayed just inside the sideline before diving across the pylon for the score. On Bowling Green's next possession, Kestantin fumbled, his second turnover of the game, and Nebraska's Derek Wacker recovered the ball and returned it 25 yards for a touchdown. Nebraska reserve quarterback TJ Lateef capped the scoring with a six-yard touchdown pass from Kwinten Ives, making the final score 56–7. Bowling Green reserve quarterback Austin Novosad made his debut on the final possession of the game but did not record any statistics. Nebraska outgained Bowling Green 546–169. Colandrea completed 20 of 24 passes for 222 yards and four touchdowns with one interception. For his performance, he was named Big Ten Offensive Player of the Week.

=== at Iowa State ===
Bowling Green Falcons (0–2) at Iowa State Cyclones (1–1) – Game summary

Quarter	1	2	3	4	Total
Falcons	7	0	0	0	7
Cyclones	21	14	10	10	55

at Jack Trice Stadium • Ames, Iowa

- Date: September 19
- Game time: 12:00 p.m. EDT / 11:00 a.m. CDT
- Game weather: Cloudy • Temperature: 74 °F (23 °C) • Wind: SE at 7 miles per hour (11 km/h)
- Game attendance: 50,395
- Referee: Rick Warne
- TV announcers (ESPNU): Courtney Lyle and Rene Ingoglia

Game information

First quarter

- (5:28) ISU – Jamal Polite 34-yard pass from Jaylen Raynor (Kyle Konrardy kick) (Drive: 3 plays, 80 yards, 00:48, Iowa State 7–0)
- (3:58) BGSU – Winn Sharp 59-yard pass from Jay Kastantin (Travis Kenner kick) (Drive: 3 plays, 75 yards, 01:30, Tied 7–7)
- (3:45) ISU – Cameron Pettaway 100-yard kickoff return (Kyle Konrardy kick) (Iowa State 14–7)
- (0:19) ISU – Aiden Flora 61-yard run (Kyle Konrardy kick) (Drive: 1 play, 61 yards, 00:11, Iowa State 21–7)

Second quarter

- (9:47) ISU – Arnold Barnes 3-yard run (Kyle Konrardy kick) (Drive: 5 plays, 56 yards, 02:27, Iowa State 28–7)
- (5:12) ISU – Aiden Flora 42-yard run (Kyle Konrardy kick) (Drive: 5 plays, 58 yards, 02:15, Iowa State 35–7)

Third quarter

- (9:16) ISU – Kyle Konrardy 39-yard field goal (Drive: 10 plays, 46 yards, 05:37, Iowa State 38–7)
- (8:07) ISU – Aiden Flora 66-yard punt return (Kyle Konrardy kick) (Iowa State 45–7)

Fourth quarter

- (8:27) ISU – Arnold Barnes 8-yard run (Kyle Konrardy kick) (Drive: 14 plays, 92 yards, 07:51, Iowa State 52–7)
- (2:22) ISU – Kyle Konrardy 40-yard field goal (Drive: 7 plays, 19 yards, 04:11, Iowa State 55–7)

Statistics	BGSU	ISU
First downs	10	25
Plays–yards	52–186	64–507
Rushes–yards	30–90	46–365
Passing yards	96	142
Passing: comp–att–int	9–22–1	12–18–1
Turnovers	2	1
Time of possession	27:11	32:49

Team	Category	Player	Statistics
Bowling Green	Passing	Jay Kastantin	8/17, 97 yards, TD, INT
Bowling Green	Rushing	Ke'Marion Baldwin	6 carries, 38 yards
Bowling Green	Receiving	Winn Sharp	1 reception, 59 yards, TD
Iowa State	Passing	Jaylen Raynor	11/17, 133 yards, TD, INT
Iowa State	Rushing	Aiden Flora	12 carries, 194 yards, 2 TD
Iowa State	Receiving	Jamal Polite	1 reception, 34 yards, TD

Iowa State entered the game 1–1 after defeating Southeast Missouri State in its season opener and losing to rival Iowa on a last-second field goal the previous week. The Cyclones defeated Bowling Green 55–7 in the third meeting between the programs, having won the previous two, with the most recent coming in 1979. Arkansas State transfer quarterback Jaylen Raynor made his 39th career start and had previously defeated Bowling Green in the 2024 68 Ventures Bowl. Iowa State also featured two former Bowling Green players in running back Cameron Pettaway, the 2025 MAC Freshman of the Year and a first-team All-MAC kick returner, and cornerback Keyon Washington.

Iowa State took an early lead on a 34-yard touchdown pass from Raynor to Jamal Polite before Bowling Green tied the game on a 59-yard touchdown pass from Jay Kastantin to Winn Sharp on a slant route. On the play, Iowa State defensive backs Jaheim Singletary and Willie Breland III collided; Singletary was hospitalized and later diagnosed with a concussion and stiff neck before being released. Pettaway then returned the ensuing kickoff 100 yards for an Iowa State-record touchdown, beginning a 48–0 Cyclones scoring run. Aiden Flora rushed for a career-high 194 yards and two touchdowns on 12 carries and added a 66-yard punt-return touchdown, marking the first time in Iowa State history the Cyclones recorded both a kickoff-return and punt-return touchdown in the same game. Flora was named to the Paul Hornung Award Honor Roll and received the Burlsworth Trophy's Walk-On of the Week honor. Arnold Barnes III also rushed for two touchdowns. Bowling Green replaced Kastantin with Austin Novosad to begin the second half after Kastantin committed two first-half turnovers, but Novosad completed only one of five passes. Iowa State outgained Bowling Green 507–186. Drey Braxton recorded Bowling Green's lone interception, while Dorian Pringle led the Falcons with nine tackles.

=== South Florida ===
South Florida Bulls (3–0) at Bowling Green Falcons (0–3) – Game summary

Quarter	1	2	3	4	Total
Bulls	0	0	0	14	14
Falcons	3	3	0	0	6

at Doyt Perry Stadium • Bowling Green, Ohio

- Date: September 26
- Game time: 5:00 p.m. EDT
- Game weather: Sunny • Temperature: 70 °F (21 °C) • Wind: NE at 9 miles per hour (14 km/h)
- Game attendance: 22,265
- Referee: Chris La Mange
- TV announcers (ESPN+): Kelsie Kasper and Ryan Cavanaugh

Game information

First quarter

- BGSU – Travis Kenner 43-yard field goal, 10:06. Falcons 3–0. Drive: 4 plays, 7 yards, 1:57.

Second quarter

- BGSU – Travis Kenner 28-yard field goal, 7:26. Falcons 6–0. Drive: 11 plays, 39 yards, 5:37.

Third quarter

- No scoring plays.

Fourth quarter

- USF – Luke Kromenhoek 2-yard run (Nico Gramatica kick), 12:07. Bulls 7–6. Drive: 6 plays, 44 yards, 2:50.
- USF – D. J. Crowther 1-yard run (Nico Gramatica kick), 5:34. Bulls 14–6. Drive: 6 plays, 72 yards, 2:43.

Statistics	USF	BGSU
First downs	16	14
Plays–yards	53–214	61–207
Rushes–yards	42–162	33–85
Passing yards	52	122
Passing: comp–att–int	7–11–0	16–28–0
Turnovers	2	0
Time of possession	27:26	32:34

Team	Category	Player	Statistics
South Florida	Passing	Michael Van Buren Jr.	7/11, 52 yards
South Florida	Rushing	D. J. Crowther	23 carries, 143 yards, TD
South Florida	Receiving	Bryson Rodgers	2 receptions, 22 yards
Bowling Green	Passing	Jay Kastantin	16/28, 122 yards
Bowling Green	Rushing	Austyn Dendy	18 carries, 48 yards
Bowling Green	Receiving	Winn Sharp	5 receptions, 56 yards

South Florida entered the matchup 3–0 with wins over FIU, Army and Delaware State under first-year head coach Brian Hartline. In its second game of the season against Army, Bulls quarterback Michael Van Buren Jr. converted a fourth-and-five in the game's final minute, connecting with Joshua Porter for a 38-yard touchdown with 19 seconds remaining to give South Florida a 28–24 victory. South Florida entered the matchup leading the all-time series 1–0, with the only previous meeting coming in the 2002 season, a 29–7 Bulls victory. Bowling Green entered its homecoming matchup with just 27 points through three games, the fewest in the program's Division I era, which began with the 1962 season.

South Florida won the coin toss and deferred. In the first half, the Falcons took advantage of two sacks by Myles Bradley that resulted in fumbles, with Bradley recovering one of them. Bradley recorded 4.5 sacks, setting a Bowling Green program record and a record for the most sacks by an individual opponent against South Florida. Bradley was subsequently named MAC Defensive Player of the Week for his performance. However, the Bulls' defense limited the Falcons to six points, all coming on two Travis Kenner field goals. South Florida's only scoring opportunity of the half came in the final seconds, when Van Buren scrambled for 30 yards before sliding at the Bowling Green 24-yard line with one second remaining. South Florida called a timeout, but Nico Gramatica's ensuing 41-yard field-goal attempt went wide right, allowing Bowling Green to take a 6–0 lead into halftime.

On the first play of the fourth quarter, Bowling Green head coach Eddie George elected to go for it on fourth-and-one from his own 45-yard line. Running back Austyn Dendy was stopped for a loss by Bulls defenders Asani Redwood and Sam Robinson. The Bulls quickly capitalized on the short field, with backup quarterback Luke Kromenhoek scoring on a 2-yard designed run. Following a Bowling Green punt, South Florida mounted a six-play, 72-yard drive that was capped by former Dartmouth transfer running back D. J. Crowther's 1-yard touchdown run.

Bowling Green's final drive reached the South Florida 30-yard line, but the Falcons faced fourth-and-16. Quarterback Jay Kastantin evaded pressure and connected with wide receiver Winn Sharp for 14 yards, but the gain came up short, resulting in a turnover on downs and allowing South Florida to run out the clock. Bowling Green finished non-conference play 0–4 and, through four weeks, ranked last in the FBS in scoring with 33 points (8.3 points per game) and total offense with 928 yards (232 yards per game), making it the only FBS program averaging fewer than 10 points per game.

=== at Miami (OH) ===
Bowling Green Falcons (0–4) at Miami RedHawks (2–2) – Game summary

Quarter	1	2	3	4	Total
Falcons	0	10	0	14	24
RedHawks	0	6	3	11	20

at Yager Stadium • Oxford, Ohio

- Date: October 3
- Game time: 3:30 p.m. EDT
- Game weather: Sunny • Temperautre: 69 °F (21 °C) • Wind: W 12 mph
- Game attendance: 12,474
- Referee: Matt Packowski
- TV announcers (ESPN+): Doug Sherman and Forest Conoly
- Box score, Recap

Game information
First quarter
- No scoring plays

Second quarter

- M-OH – Kellan McLaughlin 24-yard field goal, 9:05. RedHawks 3–0. Drive: 12 plays, 55 yards, 6:29.
- BGSU – Nakai Amachree 64-yard pass from Jay Kastantin (Travis Kenner kick), 6:57. Falcons 7–3. Drive: 3 plays, 80 yards, 2:03.
- BGSU – Travis Kenner 38-yard field goal, 1:06. Falcons 10–3. Drive: 9 plays, 60 yards, 2:46.
- M-OH – Kellan McLaughlin 41-yard field goal, 0:00. Falcons 10–6. Drive: 6 plays, 45 yards, 1:05.

Third quarter

- M-OH – Kellan McLaughlin 40-yard field goal, 1:45. Falcons 10–9. Drive: 4 plays, -2 yards, 1:54.

Fourth quarter

- BGSU – Eli Jacon-Duffy 14-yard pass from Jay Kastantin (Travis Kenner kick), 13:25. Falcons 17–9. Drive: 6 plays, 75 yards, 3:20.
- M-OH – Lynel Billups-Williams 10-yard pass from Caleb Heavner (Caleb Heavner pass to Brach Rice), 8:50. Tied 17–17. Drive: 8 plays, 81 yards, 4:28.
- M-OH – Kellan McLaughlin 28-yard field goal, 1:47. RedHawks 20–17. Drive: 7 plays, 57 yards, 2:30.
- BGSU – Leo Kemp 2-yard run (Travis Kenner kick), 0:08. Falcons 24–20. Drive: 10 plays, 75 yards, 1:39.

Statistics	BGSU	M-OH
First downs	22	20
Plays–yards	60–367	59–306
Rushes–yards	23–62	35–108
Passing yards	305	198
Passing: comp–att–int	25–37–0	17–24–0
Turnovers	0	0
Time of possession	27:18	32:42

Team	Category	Player	Statistics
Bowling Green	Passing	Jay Kastantin	25/37, 305 yards, 2 TD
Bowling Green	Rushing	Leo Kemp	3 carries, 25 yards, TD
Bowling Green	Receiving	Brennan Ridley	9 receptions, 95 yards
Miami (OH)	Passing	Caleb Heavner	17/24, 198 yards, TD
Miami (OH)	Rushing	Rodney Nelson	16 carries, 70 yards
Miami (OH)	Receiving	Lynel Billups-Williams	4 receptions, 75 yards, TD

The Falcons entered the 79th meeting with the RedHawks trailing 48–25–5 in the all-time series. Miami (OH) entered the game 2–2 after defeating UConn on a game-winning 33-yard field goal by backup kicker Brady Stidham, who had replaced starter Kellan McLaughlin. Prior to the Bowling Green game, Miami head coach Chuck Martin announced that starting quarterback David McComb, a transfer from Kansas, would miss the remainder of the season after sustaining upper- and lower-body injuries against UConn. Fort Hays State transfer Caleb Heavner, who had finished the UConn game, was named the RedHawks' starting quarterback. The game marked both teams' first MAC game of the 2026 season.

After a scoreless first quarter, Miami took a 3–0 lead on a 24-yard field goal by McLaughlin, capping a 12-play, 55-yard drive. Bowling Green responded when quarterback Jay Kastantin connected with running back Nakai Amachree on a wheel route. Amachree was left uncovered after a blown coverage and ran for a 64-yard touchdown, giving Bowling Green its first touchdown in more than seven quarters. Following a Miami punt, the teams traded field goals, with Bowling Green taking a 10–6 lead into halftime.

The defensive battle continued into the third quarter, with McLaughlin converting his third field goal of the game to cut Bowling Green's lead to one point. On the Falcons' first drive of the fourth quarter, Kastantin connected with tight end Eli Jacon-Duffy for a 14-yard touchdown, giving Bowling Green a 17–9 lead with 13:25 remaining. Heavner then led Miami on an eight-play, 81-yard drive, completing a 10-yard touchdown pass to Lynel Billups-Williams. The RedHawks converted a two-point pass to Brach Rice to tie the game at 17. Bowling Green's next drive ended with a missed 52-yard field-goal attempt wide right. Miami took advantage of the miss, with McLaughlin converting his fourth consecutive field goal, this time from 28 yards, to give the RedHawks a 20–17 lead with 1:47 remaining. McLaughlin was later named MAC Special Teams Player of the Week after going 4-for-4, rebounding from being benched the previous week. On Bowling Green's final drive, Kastantin moved the Falcons down the field and benefited from a defensive pass interference penalty that moved the ball to the Miami 2-yard line. On first-and-goal from the 2, fullback Leo Kemp took the handoff from an I-formation and reached over the pile for the go-ahead touchdown with eight seconds remaining. Kemp, who had led the Falcons in rushing during the first half, had not recorded a carry in the second half before the touchdown. He finished with 25 rushing yards on three carries, with the touchdown marking the first rushing touchdown of his career. On the ensuing kickoff, Bowling Green attempted a line-drive kick, but Miami upman Mitch Bolden recovered it at the RedHawks' 47-yard line with six seconds remaining. Following a nine-yard completion, Miami had one final play from the Bowling Green 44-yard line. Heavner was sacked by Eriq George, his third sack of the game, ending the game and securing a 24–20 Bowling Green victory.

George was named MAC Defensive Player of the Week after recording a career-high three sacks, eight tackles and three tackles for loss. Linebacker Dorian Pringle led Bowling Green with 10 total tackles. Kastantin completed 25 of 37 passes for 305 yards and two touchdowns. The Falcons rushed for 62 yards on 23 carries, averaging 2.7 yards per carry. Wide receiver Brennan Ridley led all players with nine receptions for 95 yards.

=== Sacramento State ===
Sacramento State Hornets (1–4) at Bowling Green Falcons (1–4) – Game summary

Quarter	1	2	3	4	Total
Hornets	3	0	0	7	10
Falcons	0	17	7	14	38

at Doyt Perry Stadium • Bowling Green, Ohio

- Date: October 10
- Game time: 12:00 p.m. EDT
- Game weather: Sunny • Temperature: 72 °F (22 °C) • Wind: SE at 9 miles per hour (14 km/h)
- Game attendance: 12,559
- Referee: Rich Edwards
- TV announcers (ESPN+): Anthony Lima and Jeff Woody

Statistics	SAC	BGSU
First downs	15	22
Plays–yards	63–215	58–355
Rushes–yards	35–70	41–218
Passing yards	145	137
Passing: comp–att–int	13–28–0	13–17–1
Turnovers	1	1
Time of possession	28:50	31:10

Team	Category	Player	Statistics
Sacramento State	Passing	Jackson Sharman	13/28, 145 yards, TD
Sacramento State	Rushing	Isaiah Ene	12 carries, 46 yards
Sacramento State	Receiving	Matthew Coleman	6 receptions, 85 yards, TD
Bowling Green	Passing	Jay Kastantin	11/15, 116 yards, TD, INT
Bowling Green	Rushing	Austyn Dendy	15 carries, 85 yards, 2 TD
Bowling Green	Receiving	Jeremiah Scoby	6 receptions, 70 yards

Sacramento State entered the matchup with a 1–4 record, seeking its first win in MAC play after losses to Eastern Michigan and UMass. The Hornets were also looking for their first FBS victory since transitioning from the FCS. Their lone win had come against FCS Mississippi Valley State in Week 2. In the season-opening loss to Eastern Michigan, starting quarterback Carson Conklin suffered an injury and had not played since. It was the first meeting between the two teams.

The Hornets scored the only points of the first quarter on a 33-yard field goal by Grant Meadors. In the second quarter, Bowling Green running back Austyn Dendy gave the Falcons the lead with a one-yard touchdown run. Following a Hornets punt, Travis Kenner extended the Falcons' lead to 10–3 with a 33-yard field goal. In the final seconds of the first half, Bowling Green quarterback Jay Kastantin connected with Joseph Saffold for a nine-yard touchdown, making the score 17–3 at halftime. It was Saffold's first career reception and touchdown.

On the Hornets' first possession of the second half, Meadors missed a 46-yard field goal wide left. The Falcons capitalized on the missed kick, capping a five-play, 72-yard drive with a 30-yard touchdown run by Dendy. The run featured an impressive stiff-arm and multiple broken tackles along the sideline. Early in the fourth quarter, Kastantin extended the Falcons' lead with a seven-yard designed quarterback run. On the Hornets' ensuing drive, Bowling Green's Dorian Pringle forced a fumble by running back Raiden Brown, which was recovered by D'kyah Banks and returned 27 yards for a touchdown, capping 38 unanswered points. Late in the quarter, Hornets quarterback Jackson Sharman connected with Matt Coleman for a 55-yard touchdown reception. Sacramento State recovered the ensuing onside kick but was unable to score. The Falcons ran out the remainder of the clock to secure a 38–10 victory and improve to 2–0 in MAC play.

=== Ball State ===
Ball State Cardinals (1–5) at Bowling Green Falcons (2–4) – Game summary

Quarter	1	2	3	4	OT	Total
Cardinals	3	7	7	7	8	32
Falcons	0	10	0	14	7	31

at Doyt Perry Stadium • Bowling Green, Ohio

- Date: October 17
- Game time: 12:00 p.m. EDT
- Game weather: Sunny • Temperature: 51 °F (11 °C) • Wind: N at 8 miles per hour (13 km/h)
- Game attendance: 19,875
- Referee: Andrew Speciale
- TV announcers (ESPN+): Michael Reghi and Je'Rod Cherry

Game information

First quarter
Second quarter
Third quarter
Fourth quarter

Statistics	BALL	BGSU
First downs	23	18
Plays–yards	66–435	59–313
Rushes–yards	42–240	35–98
Passing yards	195	215
Passing: comp–att–int	16–24–0	17–24–1
Turnovers	1	1
Time of possession	30:15	29:45

Team	Category	Player	Statistics
Ball State	Passing	Keldric Luster	16/24, 195 yards, TD
Ball State	Rushing	Keldric Luster	17 carries, 125 yards, TD
Ball State	Receiving	C. J. Nelson	6 receptions, 59 yards
Bowling Green	Passing	Jay Kastantin	17/24, 215 yards, 2 TD, INT
Bowling Green	Rushing	Austyn Dendy	17 carries, 61 yards, TD
Bowling Green	Receiving	Brennan Ridley	2 receptions, 84 yards, TD

Ball State entered the game with a 1–5 record, with its only victory coming in Week 2 against FCS opponent Stony Brook. The Cardinals had a challenging non-conference schedule that included a loss to Liberty, along with defeats against Big Ten opponents No. 1 Ohio State and Northwestern the previous week. Ball State was led by transfer quarterback Keldric Luster, who had previously served as a backup at SMU and Texas State. Luster earned Mid-American Conference Offensive Player of the Week honors for his performance against Stony Brook but missed the Cardinals' matchup against Kent State due to injury. This marked the 34th meeting between the schools, with Bowling Green leading the series 23–1–9. Ball State entered the game seeking its first road victory since October 12, 2024.

The Cardinals jumped out to a 10–0 lead, with Brody Boehm kicking a 39-yard field goal in the first quarter and T.J. Horton scoring on an eight-yard run in the second. Midway through the second quarter, Bowling Green responded on the first play of its ensuing possession when Jay Kastantin connected with Brennan Ridley, who took a wide receiver screen 77 yards untouched for a touchdown. In the final minute of the half, Bowling Green tied the game with a career-long 49-yard field goal by Travis Kenner.

Following a Falcons punt to begin the second half, Ball State put together a 10-play, 96-yard drive capped by a 28-yard touchdown run by Luster. On Bowling Green's ensuing possession, Kastantin was intercepted by Cardinals defensive back Willizhuan Yates inside the red zone. Following a Ball State punt, Kastantin responded with a nine-yard touchdown pass to Eli Jacon-Duffy with just over a minute remaining, tying the game. On the first play of Ball State's next possession, Luster fumbled after being hit by Kal-el Pascal, and D'Kyah Banks recovered the ball and returned it 35 yards for a touchdown to give the Falcons a 24–17 lead. It marked the second consecutive week that Banks had returned a fumble for a touchdown. Luster then led the Cardinals to the Falcons' 20-yard line with five seconds remaining. On the final play of regulation, Luster scrambled and threw across his body toward the opposite pylon, connecting with Eli Hohlt for a game-tying touchdown.

In overtime, the Falcons scored first on a four-yard touchdown run by Austyn Dendy and converted the extra point. On Ball State's possession, the Cardinals converted a fourth-and-one at the 16-yard line before Horton later scored on a one-yard touchdown run. Ball State elected to attempt a two-point conversion, and Luster found tight end Alex Scherle in the end zone, who held on to make the contested catch and give the Cardinals a 32–31 victory.

Luster finished the game with 195 passing yards, a touchdown, and a career-high 125 rushing yards on 17 carries with a rushing touchdown. The victory marked Ball State's first road win since October 12, 2024. Luster was named the Mid-American Conference Offensive Player of the Week for the second time that season, becoming the first Ball State player to win the award twice in a season since Carson Steele in 2022.

=== at Buffalo ===
Bowling Green Falcons (2–5) at Buffalo Bulls (4–3) – Game summary

Quarter	1	2	3	4	Total
Falcons	7	7	7	3	24
Bulls	7	7	7	10	31

at Broadview Stadium • Amherst, New York

- Date: October 24
- Game time: 3:30 p.m. EDT
- Game weather: Sunny • Temperature: 64 °F (18 °C) • Wind: SW at 3 miles per hour (4.8 km/h)
- Game attendance: 5,988
- Referee: Marcel Kerr
- TV announcers (ESPN+): Ryan Cavanaugh and Anthony Lima

Game information

First quarter

- BUFF – Messiah Burch 11-yard TD run (Oliver Hautanen kick), 9:03. Bulls 7–0. Drive: 8 plays, 67 yards, 2:57.
- BGSU – Isaiah Dawson 18-yard pass from Jay Kastantin (Travis Kenner kick), 1:01. Tied 7–7. Drive: 13 plays, 71 yards, 7:56.

Second quarter

- BGSU – Trey Johnson 40-yard pass from Jay Kastantin (Travis Kenner kick), 9:03. Falcons 14–7. Drive: 9 plays, 75 yards, 5:46.
- BUFF – Clint Walker 14-yard pass from Jason Wright (Oliver Hautanen kick), 0:29. Tied 14–14. Drive: 8 plays, 63 yards, 1:26.

Third quarter

- BGSU – Nakai Amachree 13-yard pass from Jay Kastantin (Travis Kenner kick), 10:13. Falcons 21–14. Drive: 4 plays, 30 yards, 1:38.
- BUFF – Messiah Burch 2-yard TD run (Oliver Hautanen kick), 8:11. Tied 21–21. Drive: 6 plays, 75 yards, 2:02.

Fourth quarter

- BUFF – Oliver Hautanen 31-yard field goal, 14:53. Bulls 24–21. Drive: 13 plays, 50 yards, 5:58.
- BUFF – Messiah Burch 73-yard TD run (Oliver Hautanen kick), 12:18. Bulls 31–21. Drive: 1 play, 73 yards, 0:12.
- BGSU – Travis Kenner 26-yard field goal, 3:33. Bulls 31–24. Drive: 9 plays, 63 yards, 5:12.

Statistics	BGSU	BUFF
First downs	17	19
Plays–yards	63–341	62–378
Rushes–yards	36–124	41–251
Passing yards	217	127
Passing: comp–att–int	19–27–2	13–21–0
Turnovers	2	1
Time of possession	35:45	24:15

Team	Category	Player	Statistics
Bowling Green	Passing	Jay Kastantin	19/27, 217 yards, 3 TD, 2 INT
Bowling Green	Rushing	Austyn Dendy	10 carries, 39 yards
Bowling Green	Receiving	Winn Sharp	5 receptions, 50 yards
Buffalo	Passing	Jason Wright	13/21, 127 yards, TD
Buffalo	Rushing	Messiah Burch	33 carries, 184 yards, 3 TD
Buffalo	Receiving	Clint Walker	2 receptions, 40 yards, TD

Buffalo entered the matchup with a 4–3 overall record and a 2–1 mark in the Mid-American Conference, coming off an overtime victory over UMass. This was the 23rd meeting between the schools, with Bowling Green leading the series 13–9.

The Bulls opened the scoring on their second possession with an 11-yard touchdown run by Messiah Burch. Bowling Green responded on its next drive when quarterback Jay Kastantin connected with Isiah Dawson for an 18-yard touchdown reception. It was Dawson's first reception and touchdown of the season after transferring from FCS Richmond. Following a Buffalo punt, the Falcons took the lead on a play-action bootleg, with Kastantin finding Trey Johnson for a 40-yard touchdown. It was Johnson's second catch of the season, fourth of his career, and first career touchdown. In the final minute of the first half, Buffalo responded when quarterback Jason Wright connected with Clint Walker for a 14-yard touchdown, tying the score at 14–14 heading into halftime.

On Bowling Green's first drive of the second half, Kastantin was intercepted by Bulls defensive back Sedrocl Vessah. Buffalo was unable to capitalize on the turnover, as Myles Bradley sacked Wright and Falcons defensive lineman Eriq George recovered the fumble. Bowling Green took advantage of the turnover, scoring on a 13-yard touchdown pass from Kastantin to Nakai Amachree. The Bulls responded with a six-play, 75-yard drive capped by Burch's one-yard touchdown run. After forcing a Bowling Green three-and-out, Buffalo drove into field-goal range and converted a 31-yard attempt by Oliver Hautanen. After another possession without a first down, Burch scored on a 73-yard touchdown run out of the pistol formation on the first play of the Bulls' next drive, breaking multiple tackles along the way. Trailing 31–21, Kastantin was intercepted by Miles Greer. However, Buffalo missed a 47-yard field goal attempt wide right. The Falcons responded with a successful 26-yard field goal with 3:33 remaining. With just over a minute remaining, Buffalo faced a fourth-and-one at the Bowling Green 37-yard line. Wright's tush push attempt was unsuccessful, as Andrew Hines III and George stopped him short of the first down, giving Bowling Green possession with an opportunity to tie the game. The Falcons crossed midfield, but their comeback attempt fell short when a three-yard completion to Amachree was tackled in bounds at the Buffalo 39-yard line, allowing the clock to expire.

Burch finished with 33 carries for 184 yards and three touchdowns, setting career highs in all three categories. For his performance, he was named a co-Mid-American Conference Offensive Player of the Week alongside Kent State's Dru DeShields.

=== at Western Michigan ===
Bowling Green Falcons (2–6) at Western Michigan Broncos (5–3) – Game summary

Quarter	1	2	3	4	Total
Falcons	7	3	0	0	10
Broncos	7	7	3	6	23

at Waldo Stadium • Kalamazoo, Michigan

- Date: October 31
- Game time: 12:00 p.m. EDT
- Game weather: Sunny • Temperature: 54 °F (12 °C) • Wind: SE at 7 miles per hour (11 km/h)
- Game attendance: 20,179
- Referee: Rick Warne
- TV announcers (CBSSN): John Sadak and Randy Cross

Statistics	BGSU	WMU
First downs	15	16
Plays–yards	62–274	57–336
Rushes–yards	30–125	39–190
Passing yards	149	146
Passing: comp–att–int	20–32–3	9–18–0
Turnovers	3	2
Time of possession	32:18	27:42

Team	Category	Player	Statistics
Bowling Green	Passing	Jay Kastantin	20/31, 149 yards, TD, 2 INT
Bowling Green	Rushing	Nakai Amachree	11 carries, 61 yards
Bowling Green	Receiving	Eli Jacon-Duffy	4 receptions, 41 yards
Western Michigan	Passing	Broc Lowry	9/18, 146 yards, TD
Western Michigan	Rushing	Cole Cabana	7 carries, 110 yards, TD
Western Michigan	Receiving	Aveion Chenault	5 receptions, 109 yards

Western Michigan entered the matchup with a 5–3 overall record and a 3–1 mark in the Mid-American Conference, as the reigning 2025 MAC champions. The Broncos opened the season with a narrow 13–12 loss to No. 16 Michigan, narrowly missing an upset. They followed with back-to-back victories over Monmouth and Rice before falling to Boise State, which entered the rankings following the victory. Western Michigan then won three consecutive conference games against Buffalo, Kent State, and Central Michigan before losing to Toledo ahead of its matchup with Bowling Green. The Broncos were led by returning starting quarterback Broc Lowry and running back Jalen Buckley, who ranked second among active FBS players in career rushing yards entering the game. Bowling Green led the all-time series 35–20–3, with the matchup marking the 59th meeting between the schools. The Falcons were also without starting running back Austyn Dendy, who was sidelined by an injury.

Following a Western Michigan punt on the opening possession, Bowling Green drove 69 yards on 11 plays, scoring on a seven-yard play-action touchdown pass from Jay Kastantin to true freshman tight end Kentrell White. It was White's second career reception and first career touchdown. After both teams went three-and-out, Western Michigan backup running back Cole Cabana took the first play of the Broncos' next possession 82 yards for a touchdown, tying the game. Cabana finished with a career-high 110 rushing yards on seven carries and a touchdown. He had transferred from Michigan, where he was part of the Wolverines' 2023 national championship team. In the second quarter, Lowry connected with tight end Ryan Brotherton for a six-yard touchdown on third-and-four, giving Western Michigan the lead. Later in the quarter, Bowling Green forced its first turnover when Dorian Pringle sacked Lowry, with Falcons defensive lineman Kade Kostus recovering the fumble at the Western Michigan 43-yard line. After both teams were forced to punt, Bowling Green's Travis Kenner connected on a 48-yard field goal as time expired, sending the Broncos into halftime with a 14–10 lead.

Western Michigan extended its lead in the third quarter with a 32-yard field goal by Dieter Kelly. Bowling Green's ensuing possession ended with a missed 32-yard field goal by Kenner. The Broncos capitalized on the missed attempt, with Kelly connecting on a 50-yard field goal to make it a two-possession game. Following a Bowling Green punt, Lowry connected with Aveion Chenault for a first down beyond midfield, but D'Kyah Banks forced a fumble that was recovered by Falcons linebacker Andrew Hines III. With Bowling Green threatening, the Falcons attempted a reverse pass, with wide receiver Brennan Ridley throwing toward Kastantin. Western Michigan linebacker Justyce Betts intercepted the pass with a one-handed catch. The Falcons' defense held, but Bowling Green's next possession unraveled. Jeremiah Scoby fumbled a reception, and Kastantin lost a fumble on a sack on the following play, although the Falcons recovered both fumbles. On third down, Kastantin was intercepted. Western Michigan added to its lead with Kelly's third field goal of the game, a 46-yard attempt. On the first play of Bowling Green's next possession, Kastantin was intercepted again, allowing the Broncos to run out the clock and secure a 23–10 victory.

Buckley entered the game ranked second among active FBS players in career rushing yards but surpassed Makhi Hughes to take the top spot. He finished with 77 yards on 24 carries, bringing his career rushing total to 3,427 yards. Western Michigan punter Ryan Millmore recorded five punts for an average of 51.4 yards, including three inside the 20-yard line and two of at least 50 yards. His longest punt traveled 59 yards, a career best. For his performance, Millmore was named the MAC Special Teams Player of the Week. The loss dropped Bowling Green to 2–7, eliminating the Falcons from bowl eligibility for the second consecutive season. Western Michigan improved to 6–3, becoming bowl eligible for the season.

=== Kent State (Anniversary Award) ===
Kent State Golden Flashes (3–6) at Bowling Green Falcons (2–7) – Game summary

Quarter	1	2	3	4	Total
Golden Flashes	7	7	0	14	28
Falcons	7	10	10	6	33

at Doyt Perry Stadium • Bowling Green, Ohio

- Date: November 10
- Game time: 7:00 p.m. EST
- Game weather: Clear • Temperature: 51 °F (11 °C) • Wind: W at 6 miles per hour (9.7 km/h)
- Game attendance: 10,254
- Referee: Chris La Mange
- TV announcers (ESPNU): Eric Rothman and Forrest Conoly

Statistics	KENT	BGSU
First downs	20	15
Plays–yards	70–409	61–347
Rushes–yards	32–77	36–118
Passing yards	332	229
Passing: comp–att–int	19–38–2	15–25–0
Turnovers	2	0
Time of possession	30:36	29:24

Team	Category	Player	Statistics
Kent State	Passing	Dru DeShields	19/38, 332 yards, 2 TD, 2 INT
Kent State	Rushing	Dru DeShields	12 carries, 35 yards, 2 TD
Kent State	Receiving	Wayne Harris	8 receptions, 143 yards, 2 TD
Bowling Green	Passing	Austin Novosad	15/25, 229 yards, 3 TD
Bowling Green	Rushing	Nakai Amachree	19 carries, 110 yards, TD
Bowling Green	Receiving	Nakai Amachree	3 receptions, 87 yards, TD

Bowling Green leads the Anniversary Award series, 62–25–6, heading into the matchup. Kent State entered the matchup with a 3–6 record, still seeking its first road win of the season. Prior to the game, Bowling Green announced that starting quarterback Jay Kastantin and top receiver Winn Sharp were injured, while running back Austyn Dendy was set to miss his second consecutive game.

On Kent State's opening drive, the Falcons defense forced a turnover on downs inside the Bowling Green 30-yard line. Falcons quarterback Austin Novosad, who made his first collegiate start, connected with Nakai Amachree on a 70-yard wheel pass for a touchdown on his first pass attempt of the game. Kent State tied the game on a nine-yard quarterback run by Dru DeShields. In the second quarter, the Golden Flashes took the lead following a nine-play, 70-yard drive, capped by a 39-yard touchdown pass from DeShields to Wayne Harris. Bowling Green responded with a 23-yard touchdown on a play-action screen pass to tight end Eli Jacob-Duffy. Following a three-and-out by Kent State, the Falcons took a 17–14 lead on a 46-yard field goal by Travis Kenner.

To open the second half, Novosad led Bowling Green on a 10-play, 60-yard drive, finishing with a one-yard touchdown pass to Blane Cleaver in the back corner of the end zone, just over the reach of two Golden Flashes defenders. Later in the quarter, Kenner extended the Falcons' lead with a 38-yard field goal. In the fourth quarter, DeShields was intercepted by Josira Andrews on a fourth-and-goal attempt. Following a Bowling Green punt, DeShields connected with Harris for a 13-yard touchdown on fourth-and-seven. Harris finished with a game-high eight receptions for 143 yards and two touchdowns, marking his third consecutive game with at least 100 receiving yards and his fourth in the previous five games. After another Falcons punt, Bowling Green's defense forced a crucial stop, with Myles Bradley recording consecutive sacks on second and third down. Bradley finished with a Bowling Green single-game record five sacks, surpassing his own mark set earlier in the season against South Florida. For his performance, he was named MAC Defensive Player of the Week and led the FBS with 14 sacks through the conclusion of the week. However, on the ensuing punt, Bowling Green lineman Kade Kostus was flagged for roughing the long snapper, giving Kent State an automatic first down. Later in the drive, DeShields scored on a 25-yard run to give the Golden Flashes a 28–27 lead with two minutes remaining. On the second play of Bowling Green's ensuing drive, Amachree took a handoff on a sweep from the shotgun formation, evaded several Kent State defenders, and scored on a 48-yard touchdown run. Following an unsuccessful two-point conversion attempt by Novosad, Nick Sawyer intercepted DeShields in the end zone on a deep pass attempt from the 38-yard line with just under a minute remaining, allowing the Falcons to run out the clock.

In his first career start, Novosad threw for 229 yards and three touchdowns. Amachree finished with 197 all-purpose yards and two touchdowns. Bowling Green linebacker Dorian Pringle led the game with 10 total tackles and a pass deflection, while the Falcons defense recorded eight sacks, 11 tackles for loss, six pass deflections, and two interceptions. Falcons punter Ryan Kingston averaged 44.6 yards on seven punts, including a long of 53 yards and one punt inside the 20-yard line. For his performance, he was named MAC Special Teams Player of the Week.

=== at Toledo (Battle of I-75) ===
Bowling Green Falcons (3–7) at Toledo Rockets (8–2) – Game summary

Quarter	1	2	3	4	Total
Falcons	0	0	0	0	0
Rockets	0	0	0	0	0

at Glass Bowl • Toledo, Ohio

- Date: November 20
- Game time: 7:30 p.m. EST
- TV: ESPN2

Statistics	BGSU	TOL
First downs		
Plays–yards		
Rushes–yards		
Passing yards		
Passing: comp–att–int		
Turnovers		
Time of possession		

Team	Category	Player	Statistics
Bowling Green	Passing		
Bowling Green	Rushing		
Bowling Green	Receiving		
Toledo	Passing		
Toledo	Rushing		
Toledo	Receiving		

=== UMass ===
UMass Minutemen (5–6) at Bowling Green Falcons (0–0) – Game summary

Quarter	1	2	3	4	Total
Minutemen	0	0	0	0	0
Falcons	0	0	0	0	0

at Doyt Perry Stadium • Bowling Green, Ohio

- Date: November 28
- Game time: 12:00 p.m. EST

Statistics	MASS	BGSU
First downs		
Plays–yards		
Rushes–yards		
Passing yards		
Passing: comp–att–int		
Turnovers		
Time of possession		

Team	Category	Player	Statistics
UMass	Passing		
UMass	Rushing		
UMass	Receiving		
Bowling Green	Passing		
Bowling Green	Rushing		
Bowling Green	Receiving		

== Personnel ==
=== Roster ===
2026 Bowling Green Falcons football team roster
Players
Coaches
Offense

Pos.	#	Name	Class
RB	1	Austyn Dendy	So
RB	2	Nakai Amachree	So
WR	3	Trey Johnson	Sr
RB	4	Ke'Marion Baldwin	Jr
WR	5	Brennan Ridley	Jr
WR	6	Isaiah Dawson	So
TE	7	Jeremiah Scoby	So
TE	8	Eli Jacon-Duffy	So
WR	9	Nick Sowell	Jr
QB	10	Hunter Najm	So
WR	11	Austin Clay	So
QB	12	Jarin Mock	Fr
WR	14	Pauly Sadler	Fr
QB	15	Jay Kastantin	Jr
QB	16	Austin Novosad	Jr
WR	18	Winn Sharp	So
WR	19	Joseph Saffold	Fr
WR	23	Dom Woods	Fr
WR	25	Cade Brooks	Fr
FB	44	Leo Kemp	Sr
TE	47	Kentrell White	Fr
OT	50	Vincent Giordano	Fr
G	53	Masyn Zahursky	Fr
C	54	Brody Bolyn	Jr
OT	58	Ethan Kraatz	Fr
OL	65	Gabe Funk	So
OT	66	Zane Panchula	Fr
OT	70	Alex Harris	So
OL	71	Travis Robertson	Fr
G	73	Caden Campbell	So
OL	75	Maddux Murphy	Fr
G	77	James Thomas Jr.	Jr
G	78	Alexis Sanchez	Sr
TE	80	Ocean Brabbs	So
WR	83	Pierce St Geme	So
TE	85	Reece Little	Fr
WR	87	Reddik Pillarelli	So
TE	88	Carsen Melvin	Sr
TE	89	Blane Cleaver	Sr

Defense

Pos.	#	Name	Class
S	0	Kal-El Pascal	Jr
CB	2	JoJo Johnson	Sr
LB	3	Dorian Pringle	So
DL	4	Kade Kostus	Sr
DE	5	Eriq George	Sr
LB	6	Sanders Ellis	Jr
DB	7	Mike Wright III	Jr
S	9	Preston EstoEsta	So
LB	10	Andrew Hines III	So
DB	11	Armhan Hale	Sr
DB	13	Chris Newell Jr.	Fr
DB	14	JayT Jackson	Sr
S	15	D'kyah Banks	So
DE	17	Jaimion Olverson	Fr
CB	18	Nick Sawyer	Sr
S	19	Jahai Johnson	Fr
DB	22	Julian Holt	Fr
DE	23	Myles Bradley	Sr
CB	26	Josira Andrews	So
DL	28	Samuel Dossous	Fr
CB	32	Rico Garcia	Fr
LB	35	Cashmire Lewis	Fr
LB	36	Jabari Mitchell	Jr
CB	37	Garrison Blair	So
LB	39	Henry Reifschneider	So
S	40	DeVenchi Arnold II	Fr
DB	41	Drey Braxton	Jr
DT	43	MJ Dillard	So
LB	44	AJ Odom	Sr
DE	48	Quentin Lewis	Fr
LB	50	Jonathan Goins	So
DL	52	Elijah Durham-Smith	Fr
DT	54	Dior Garner	Fr
DL	55	Timothy Taylor Jr.	Fr
DL	56	John Baker IV	Fr
DT	57	Dayln White	Jr
DL	88	Selah Brown	Sr
DT	99	Brendon Rice

Special teams

Pos.	#	Name	Class
PK	12	Travis Kenner	Jr
PK	27	Treyton McKee	Fr
P	30	Ryan Kingston	Sr
PK	40	Ethan Warner	Sr
LS	52	Quinn Forsythe	Fr
LS	56	Quillan Jimenez	Jr

Head coach

- Eddie George

Coordinators/assistant coaches

- Greg Nosal – Offensive Coordinator/offensive line
- Joe Bowden – Defensive coordinator/ Linebackers
- Greg Froelich – Special teams coordinator
- Dewayne Alexander — Assistant Head Coach/Tight Ends
- Jaylon Bowden — Safeties Coach
- Josh Crawford — Assistant Running Backs Coach
- Bruce Johnson — Assistant Wide Receivers Coach
- Spencer McCourt — Assistant Quarterbacks Coach
- Richard McNutt — Pass Game Coordinator/Secondary
- Clyde Simmons — Assistant Defensive Line
- Lorenzo Styles — Senior Analyst/Defensive Line
- Brian White — Senior Analyst/Running Backs
- Baron May — Offensive Analyst
- Jack McCarthy — Assistant Offensive Line Coach
- Scott Stolz — Defensive Quality Control
- Christopher Contratto — Special Teams Analyst

Legend

- (C) Team captain
- (S) Suspended
- (I) Ineligible
- Injured
- Redshirt

Roster
Last update: June 30, 2026
