= 2023 Oregon Ducks football team =

American college football season

2023 Oregon Ducks football

Fiesta Bowl champion

Pac-12 Championship Game, L 31–34 vs. Washington

Fiesta Bowl, W 45–6 vs. Liberty
- Conference: Pac-12 Conference

Ranking
- Coaches: No. 7
- AP: No. 6
- Record: 12–2 (8–1 Pac-12)
- Head coach: Dan Lanning (2nd season)
- Offensive coordinator: Will Stein (1st season)
- Co-offensive coordinator: Junior Adams (2nd season)
- Offensive scheme: Spread option
- Defensive coordinator: Tosh Lupoi (2nd season)
- Co-defensive coordinator: Chris Hampton (1st season)
- Base defense: 4–3 or 4–2–5
- Home stadium: Autzen Stadium

2023 Pac-12 Conference football standings
	Conf.			Overall
Team	W		L	W		L
No. 2 Washington y$^	9	–	0	14	–	1
No. 6 Oregon y	8	–	1	12	–	2
No. 11 Arizona	7	–	2	10	–	3
Oregon State	5	–	4	8	–	5
Utah	5	–	4	8	–	5
USC	5	–	4	8	–	5
California	4	–	5	6	–	7
UCLA	4	–	5	8	–	5
Washington State	2	–	7	5	–	7
Stanford	2	–	7	3	–	9
Arizona State*	2	–	7	3	–	9
Colorado	1	–	8	4	–	8
Championship: Washington 34, Oregon 31
^ – College Football Playoff participant; $ – Conference champion; y – Championship game participant; * – Ineligible for postseason play due to self-imposed ban for 2020 recruiting violations; Rankings from AP Poll

The 2023 Oregon Ducks football team represented the University of Oregon as a member of the Pac-12 Conference during the 2023 NCAA Division I FBS football season. The Ducks were led by Dan Lanning in his second year as Oregon's head coach. They played their home games at Autzen Stadium in Eugene, Oregon. This was their final season in the Pac-12 Conference as they moved to the Big Ten Conference in 2024. The Oregon Ducks football team drew an average home attendance of 55,895 in 2023, the 32nd highest in college football.

== Offseason ==
=== 2023 NFL draft ===
Round	Pick	Player	Position	Team
1	17	Christian Gonzalez	CB	New England Patriots
3	80	DJ Johnson	OLB	Carolina Panthers
5	148	Noah Sewell	LB	Chicago Bears
6	199	Malaesala Aumavae-Laulu	OT	Baltimore Ravens
7	244	Jordon Riley	DT	New York Giants
7	257	Alex Forsyth	C	Denver Broncos

==== Undrafted NFL free agents ====
Player	Position	Team
Chase Cota	WR	Detroit Lions
Bennett Williams	S	Miami Dolphins
T. J. Bass	G	Dallas Cowboys

Departing transfers
Name	No.	Pos.	Height	Weight	Year	Hometown	New school
Dont'e Thornton	#2	WR	6'5	199	Junior	Baltimore, MD	Tennessee
Sean Dollars	#5	RB	5'8	199	Junior	Rancho Cucamonga, CA	Nevada
Anthony Jones	#5	OLB	6'3	243	RS Freshman	Rochester, NY	Indiana
Isaah Crocker	#6	WR	6'1	183	Senior	Sacramento, CA	Nevada
Seven McGee	#7	WR	5'8	167	Junior	Las Vegas, NV	Jackson State
Moliki Matavao	#8	TE	6'6	256	Junior	Henderson, NV	UCLA
Jay Butterfield	#9	QB	6'6	216	RS Sophomore	Brentwood, CA	San Jose State
Jaden Navarrette	#9	OLB	6'3	230	RS Sophomore	Norco, CA	TBD
Justin Flowe	#10	ILB	6'3	220	RS Sophomore	Chino, CA	Arizona
Terrell Tilmon	#12	TE	6'5	221	Junior	Mansfield, TX	Texas Tech
Isaiah Brevard	#15	WR	6'3	196	RS Sophomore	Memphis, TN	TBD
Jabril McNeill	#17	OLB	6'4	230	Junior	Raleigh, NC	Troy
Caleb Chapman	#19	WR	6'5	218	Graduate	Clear Lake, TX	Incarnate Word
Jalil Tucker	#20	DB	6'0	165	RS Freshman	San Diego, CA	San Diego State
Keith Brown	#21	ILB	6'1	235	Junior	Lebanon, OR	Louisville
Byron Cardwell	#21	RB	6'0	206	Junior	San Diego, CA	California
Darren Barkins	#22	DB	5'9	170	RS Sophomore	Spring Valley, CA	Washington
Trejon Williams	#23	DB	5'11	187	RS Freshman	Portland, OR	TBD
Jonathan Flowe	#25	DB	6'1	209	RS Sophomore	Chino, CA	TBD
Avante Dickerson	#28	DB	6'0	173	RS Sophomore	Omaha, NE	Utah State
Adrian Jackson	#29	OLB	6'3	230	Junior	Denver, CO	Nevada
Aaron Smith	#34	RB	5'11	225	RS Freshman	San Jose, CA	Oklahoma Baptist
Harrison Taggart	#34	ILB	6'1	216	Sophomore	Draper, UT	BYU
Tom Snee	#38	P	6'3	205	Senior	Melbourne, Australia	TBD
Sir Mells	#40	DL	6'3	315	RS Freshman	Las Vegas, NV	Utah State
Jackson LaDuke	#42	ILB	6'2	236	RS Sophomore	Sparks, NV	Nevada
Brandon Buckner	#43	OLB	6'1	250	RS Sophomore	Charlotte, NC	Middle Tennessee
Bradyn Swinson	#44	DE	6'4	233	Junior	Douglasville, GA	LSU
Treven Ma'ae	#48	DL	6'5	272	Junior	Kapolei, HI	Baylor
Jonah Miller	#51	OL	6'7	260	Junior	Tucson, AZ	TBD
Cole Young	#67	OL	6'5	321	Junior	Medina, WA	Campbell
Bram Walden	#72	OL	6'3	304	RS Sophomore	Scottsdale, AZ	Arizona State
Dawson Jaramillo	#79	OL	6'5	300	Senior	Portland, OR	NC State
Cam McCormick	#84	TE	6'5	260	Graduate	Bend, OR	Miami (FL)
Malachi Russell	#85	WR	5'11	163	Senior	Oceanside, CA	TBD
Keanu Williams	#99	DL	6'4	300	RS Sophomore	Clovis, CA	UCLA

=== Additions ===
Incoming transfers
Name	No.	Pos.	Height	Weight	Year	Hometown	Prev. school
Tysheem Johnson	#0	DB	5'10	190	Junior	Philadelphia, PA	Ole Miss
Jordan Burch	#1	DE	6'5	275	Junior	Columbia, SC	South Carolina
Gary Bryant Jr.	#2	WR	5'11	180	RS Sophomore	Riverside, CA	USC
Jestin Jacobs	#4	ILB	6'3	205	Junior	Englewood, OH	Iowa
Traeshon Holden	#5	WR	6'3	208	Junior	Kissimee, FL	Alabama
Khyree Jackson	#5	DB	6'3	197	Senior	Upper Marlboro, MD	Alabama
Tez Johnson	#15	WR	5'10	150	Junior	Pinson, AL	Troy
Connor Soelle	#22	ILB	6'1	220	Junior	Scottsdale, AZ	Arizona State
Nikko Reed	#25	CB	5'10	185	Junior	Oakland, CA	Colorado
Evan Williams	#33	DB	6'0	185	Senior	Campbell, CA	Fresno State
Kaden Ludwick	#42	TE	6'5	240	RS Freshman	Happy Valley, OR	Colorado
Nishad Strother	#50	OL	6'3	326	Junior	Havelock, NC	East Carolina
Junior Angilau	#54	OL	6'6	311	Senior	Salt Lake City, UT	Texas
Ajani Cornelius	#65	OL	6'5	310	Junior	Harlem, NY	Rhode Island
Casey Kelly	#81	TE	6'4	220	Junior	Niagara Falls, NY	Ole Miss

== Schedule ==
Date	Time	Opponent	Rank	Site	TV	Result	Attendance
September 2	12:00 p.m.	Portland State*	No. 15	Autzen Stadium; Eugene, OR	P12N	W 81–7	45,723
September 9	4:00 p.m.	at Texas Tech*	No. 13	Jones AT&T Stadium; Lubbock, TX	FOX	W 38–30	56,200
September 16	5:00 p.m.	Hawaii*	No. 13	Autzen Stadium; Eugene, OR	P12N	W 55–10	52,779
September 23	12:30 p.m.	No. 19 Colorado	No. 10	Autzen Stadium; Eugene, OR	ABC	W 42–6	59,889
September 30	3:30 p.m.	at Stanford	No. 9	Stanford Stadium; Stanford, CA (rivalry)	P12N	W 42–6	32,160
October 14	12:30 p.m.	at No. 7 Washington	No. 8	Husky Stadium; Seattle, WA (rivalry, College GameDay)	ABC	L 33–36	71,321
October 21	12:30 p.m.	Washington State	No. 9	Autzen Stadium; Eugene, OR	ABC	W 38–24	58,886
October 28	12:30 p.m.	at No. 13 Utah	No. 8	Rice–Eccles Stadium; Salt Lake City, UT (College GameDay)	FOX	W 35–6	53,586
November 4	2:30 p.m.	California	No. 6	Autzen Stadium; Eugene, OR	P12N	W 63–19	54,046
November 11	7:30 p.m.	USC	No. 6	Autzen Stadium; Eugene, OR (rivalry)	FOX	W 36–27	59,957
November 18	1:00 p.m.	at Arizona State	No. 6	Mountain America Stadium; Tempe, AZ	FOX	W 49–13	44,741
November 24	5:30 p.m.	No. 16 Oregon State	No. 6	Autzen Stadium; Eugene, OR (rivalry)	FOX	W 31–7	59,987
December 1	5:00 p.m.	vs. No. 3 Washington	No. 5	Allegiant Stadium; Paradise, NV (Pac-12 Championship Game)	ABC	L 31–34	61,195
January 1, 2024	10:00 a.m.	vs. No. 23 Liberty	No. 8	State Farm Stadium; Glendale, AZ (Fiesta Bowl)	ESPN	W 45–6	47,769
*Non-conference game; Rankings from AP Poll (and CFP Rankings, after October 31) - Released prior to game; All times are in Pacific time

== Roster ==
2023 Oregon Ducks football team roster
Players
Coaches
Offense

Pos.	#	Name	Class
RB	0	Bucky Irving	Jr
WR	1	Kris Hutson	Jr
WR	2	Gary Bryant Jr.	So
TE	3	Terrance Ferguson	Jr
WR	5	Traeshon Holden	Jr
RB	6	Noah Whittington	Jr
QB	10	Bo Nix	Sr
WR	11	Troy Franklin	Jr
QB	12	Brock Thomas	Fr
QB	13	Ty Thompson	So
WR	14	Justius Lowe	Fr
WR	15	Tez Johnson	Jr
QB	16	Austin Novosad	Fr
WR	17	Kyler Kasper	Fr
TE	18	Kenyon Sadiq	Fr
RB	20	Jordan James	So
RB	23	Ellis Bynum	Fr
RB	24	Dante Dowdell	Fr
RB	25	Brison Cobbins	So
RB	27	Jayden Limar	Fr
WR	28	Preston Alford	Fr
RB	29	Kilohana Haasenritter	So
TE	42	Kaden Ludwick	Fr
TE	44	Zach Grace	Fr
TE	45	Peter Burke	Fr
OL	50	Nishad Strother	Jr
OL	52	Dave Iuli	So
OL	54	Junior Angilau	Sr
OL	55	Marcus Harper II	Jr
OL	58	Jackson Powers-Johnson	Jr
OL	60	Kanen Rossi	So
OL	62	Holden Whipple	So
OL	63	Brodie Wright	Fr
OL	64	Ty Delgado	So
OL	65	Ajani Cornelius	Jr
OL	66	Bryce Boulton	Fr
OL	67	Beau CressAllen	Fr
OL	68	Auston	Fr
OL	69	Bailey Jaramillo	So
OL	70	Charlie Pickard	So
OL	71	George Silva	Jr
OL	72	Iapani Laloulu	Fr
OL	73	Kawika Rogers	Fr
OL	74	Steven Jones	Sr
OL	75	Faaope Laloulu	Jr
OL	76	Josh Conerly Jr.	So
OL	77	Michael Wooten	Fr
OL	78	Gernorris Wilson	Fr
OL	79	Lipe Moala	Fr
WR	80	Ashton Cozart	Fr
TE	81	Casey Kelly	Jr
WR	82	Andrew Walker	Fr
WR	83	Josh Delgado	Jr
WR	84	Micah Williams	Jr
TE	85	Travis Brashear	Fr
WR	86	Darrian Anderson	Fr
WR	87	Von Reames	So
TE	88	Patrick Herbert	Jr
WR	89	Landen Shepard	Fr
WR	99	Jurrion Dickey	Fr

Defense

Pos.	#	Name	Class
DB	0	Tysheem Johnson	Jr
DE	1	Jordan Burch	Jr
ILB	2	Jeffrey Bassa	Jr
DE	3	Brandon Dorlus	Sr
ILB	4	Jestin Jacobs	Jr
DB	5	Khyree Jackson	Sr
DB	6	Jahlil Florence	So
DB	7	Steve Stephens IV	Sr
DB	8	Dontae Manning	Jr
ILB	9	Jamal Hill	Sr
DE	10	Matayo Uiagalelei	Fr
DB	11	Trikweze Bridges	Jr
DB	12	Daymon David	Jr
DB	13	Bryan Addison	Sr
DB	14	Khamari Terrell	So
DB	15	Solomon Davis	Fr
DB	16	Rodrick Pleasant	Fr
OLB	17	Blake Purchase	Fr
OLB	18	Mase Funa	Sr
DB	19	Tyler Turner	Fr
DB	20	Collin Gill	Fr
DB	21	Cole Martin	Fr
ILB	22	Connor Soelle	Jr
DB	23	Marko Vidackovic	So
DB	24	Devin Morrow	So
DB	25	Nikko Reed	Jr
ILB	26	Devon Jackson	Fr
DB	27	Daylen Austin	Fr
ILB	28	Bryce Boettcher	Jr
OLB	29	Ashton Porter	Fr
DB	30	Xavier Barksdale	Fr
DB	31	Kodi DeCambra	Fr
OLB	32	Emar'rion Winston	Fr
DB	33	Evan Williams	Sr
DB	35	D. J. Beckum	So
DB	36	Timon Davis	So
DB	37	Hunter Roberts	Fr
ILB	38	Will Straton	Fr
DB	39	Dane Sipos	So
DB	41	Zach Grisham	Fr
ILB	46	Chip Allers	Fr
ILB	47	Elijah Williams	Fr
DT	50	Popo Aumavae	GS
DL	52	Ben Roberts	So
ILB	54	Jerry Mixon	Fr
DL	55	Taki Taimani	Sr
OLB	56	Jaeden Moore	Fr
DL	58	A'Mauri Washington	Fr
DL	59	Tevita Pome'e	Fr
DL	61	JaJuan Dickey	So
OLB	90	Jake Shipley	Jr
DL	91	Johnny Bowens III	Fr
DL	93	My'Keil Gardner	Fr
DT	95	Keyon Ware-Hudson	Jr
DL	97	Josh Simmons	Jr
DL	98	Casey Rogers	Sr
DL	99	Terrance Green	Fr

Special teams

Pos.	#	Name	Class
LS	43	Luke Basso	So
P	45	Luke Dunne	Fr
LS	47	Colson Brunner	Jr
K	49	Camden Lewis	Sr
P	92	Ross James	So
K	93	Grant Meadors	Fr
LS	94	Keller Stafford	Fr
LS	96	Nick Duzansky	Fr
K	98	Andrew Boyle	Jr

Head coach

- Dan Lanning

Coordinators/assistant coaches

- Will Stein – Offensive coordinator / Quarterbacks
- Tosh Lupoi – Defensive coordinator / Linebackers
- Junior Adams – Co-offensive Coordinator / Wide receivers
- Chris Hampton – Co-defensive coordinator / Defensive backs
- Joe Lorig – Special teams coordinator / Nickel backs
- Carlos Locklyn – Running backs
- Drew Mehringer – Tight ends
- Brian Michalowski – Inside linebackers
- A'lique Terry – Offensive linemen
- Tony Tuioti – Defensive linemen
- Wilson Love – Director, Strength and Conditioning
- Mark Davis – Assistant Strength and Conditioning Coach
- Christian Tupou – Assistant Strength and Conditioning Coach
- Mike Cavanaugh – Offensive Analyst
- Steven Haunga – Offensive Analyst
- Koa Ka'ai – Offensive Analyst
- Antonio Parks – Offensive Analyst
- Jordan Salkin – Offensive Analyst
- Dante Bartee – Defensive Analyst
- Connor Boyd – Defensive Analyst
- Skyler Jones – Defensive Analyst
- Zach Tinker – Special Teams Analyst
- Kamran Araghi – Graduate Assistant
- Jack Smith – Graduate Assistant
- Rashad Wadood – Graduate Assistant

Legend

- (C) Team captain
- (S) Suspended
- (I) Ineligible
- Injured
- Redshirt

Roster

== Game summaries ==
=== vs. Portland State ===
Portland State Vikings (0–0) at No. 15 Oregon Ducks (0–0)

Quarter	1	2	3	4	Total
Portland State	7	0	0	0	7
No. 15 Oregon	22	28	17	14	81

at Autzen Stadium

- Date: September 2
- Game time: 3:00 p.m. EST/12:00 p.m. PST
- Game weather: Sunny • Temperature: 73 °F (23 °C) • Wind: 3 mph W
- Game attendance: 45,723
- Referee: Justin Elliott
- TV announcers (Pac-12 Network): Roxy Bernstein (play-by-play) and Lincoln Kennedy (analyst)

Game information

First quarter

- 11:01 ORE - Troy Franklin 13-yard pass from Bo Nix (Terrance Ferguson run for two-point conversion) - 8-0 Oregon, Drive: 7 plays, 66 yards, 2:34
- 7:01 PRST - Chance Miller 9-yard pass from Dante Chachere (Gianni Smith kick) - 8-7 Oregon, Drive: 9 plays, 75 yards, 4:00
- 5:53 ORE - Bucky Irving 52-yard run (Camden Lewis kick) - 15-7 Oregon, Drive: 3 plays, 75 yards, 1:08
- 2:14 ORE - Troy Franklin 32-yard pass from Bo Nix (Camden Lewis kick) - 22-7 Oregon, Drive: 6 plays, 57 yards, 2:02

Second quarter

- 11:11 ORE - Jordan James 9-yard run (Camden Lewis kick) - 29-7 Oregon, Drive: 4 plays, 60 yards, 1:37
- 10:42 ORE - Jordan James 4-yard run (Camden Lewis kick) - 36-7 Oregon, Drive: 4 plays, 13 yards, 0:25
- 5:56 ORE - Bucky Irving 56-yard run (Camden Lewis kick) - 43-7 Oregon, Drive: 5 plays, 83 yards, 2:06
- 1:14 ORE - Jordan James 9-yard run (Camden Lewis kick) - 50-7 Oregon, Drive: 7 plays, 73 yards, 3:18

Third quarter

- 14:09 ORE - Gary Bryant Jr. 10-yard pass from Bo Nix (Grant Meadors kick) - 57-7 Oregon, Drive: 3 plays, 75 yards, 0:51
- 9:56 ORE - Gary Bryant Jr. 21-yard pass from Ty Thompson (Grant Meadors kick) - 64-7 Oregon, Drive: 6 plays, 70 yards, 2:48
- 2:08 ORE - Camden Lewis 41-yard field goal - 67-7 Oregon, Drive: 11 plays, 47 yards, 5:43

Fourth quarter

- 11:12 ORE - Dante Dowdell 3-yard run (Grant Meadors kick) - 74-7 Oregon, Drive: 9 plays, 80 yards, 3:54
- 2:04 ORE - Jayden Limar 17-yard run (Grant Meadors kick) - 81-7 Oregon, Drive: 5 plays, 41 yards, 2:46

Statistics	Portland State	No. 15 Oregon
First downs	9	37
Plays–yards	57–200	72–729
Rushes–yards	37–148	34–348
Passing yards	52	381
Passing: comp–att–int	8–20–0	33–38–0
Turnovers		
Time of possession	28:37	31:23

Team	Category	Player	Statistics
Portland State	Passing	Dante Chachere	5/14, 35 yards, 1 TD
Portland State	Rushing	Dante Chachere	6 carries, 53 yards
Portland State	Receiving	Jaden Casey	3 receptions, 17 yards
No. 15 Oregon	Passing	Bo Nix	23/27, 287 yards, 3 TD
No. 15 Oregon	Rushing	Bucky Irving	4 carries, 119 yards, 2 TD
No. 15 Oregon	Receiving	Troy Franklin	7 receptions, 106 yards, 2 TD

=== at. Texas Tech ===
No. 13 Oregon Ducks (1–0) at Texas Tech Red Raiders (0–1)

Quarter	1	2	3	4	Total
No. 13 Oregon	15	3	0	20	38
Texas Tech	7	6	14	3	30

at Jones AT&T Stadium

- Date: September 9
- Game time: 7:00 p.m. EST/4:00 p.m. PST
- Game weather: Sunny • Temperature: 96 °F (36 °C) • Wind: 12 mph W
- Game attendance: 56,200
- Referee: Mike McCabe
- TV announcers (FOX): Mark Followill (play-by-play) and Mark Helfrich (analyst)

Game information

First quarter

- 9:37 TTU - Myles Price 18-yard pass from Tyler Shough (Gino Garcia kick) - 7-0 Texas Tech, Drive: 6 plays, 85 yards, 2:30
- 8:58 ORE - Troy Franklin 72-yard pass from Bo Nix (Camden Lewis kick) - 7-7, Drive: 2 plays, 75 yards, 0:39
- 3:45 ORE - Tez Johnson 13-yard pass from Bo Nix (Patrick Herbert two-point pass complete to Terrance Ferguson) - 15-7 Oregon, Drive: 7 plays, 60 yards, 3:56

Second quarter

- 13:01 TTU - Mason Tharp 7-yard pass from Tyler Shough (Tyler Shough two-point pass incomplete) - 15-13 Oregon, Drive: 15 plays, 75 yards, 5:44
- 0:59 ORE - Camden Lewis 28-yard field goal - 18-13 Oregon, Drive: 11 plays, 56 yards, 3:05

Third quarter

- 12:58 TTU - Tyler Shough 5-yard run (Gino Garcia kick) - 20-18 Texas Tech, Drive: 5 plays, 75 yards, 2:02
- 6:16 TTU - Jerand Bradley 34-yard pass from Tyler Shough (Gino Garcia kick) - 27-18 Texas Tech, Drive: 3 plays, 83 yards, 1:04

Fourth quarter

- 14:47 ORE - Bucky Irving 3-yard run (Camden Lewis kick) - 27-25 Texas Tech, Drive: 17 plays, 75 yards, 6:29
- 10:27 ORE - Camden Lewis 23-yard field goal - 28-27 Oregon, Drive: 6 plays, 28 yards, 2:32
- 5:13 TTU - Gino Garcia 45-yard field goal - 30-28 Texas Tech, Drive: 12 plays, 48 yards, 5:14
- 1:10 ORE - Camden Lewis 34-yard field goal - 31-30 Oregon, Drive: 10 plays, 64 yards, 4:03
- 0:35 ORE - Jeffrey Bassa 45-yard interception return (Camden Lewis kick) - 38-30 Oregon, Drive: 3 plays, 22 yards, 0:35

Statistics	No. 13 Oregon	Texas Tech
First downs	21	27
Plays–yards	75-472	70-456
Rushes–yards	31–113	32–174
Passing yards	359	282
Passing: comp–att–int	32–44-0	24–38–3
Turnovers		
Time of possession	32:15	27:45

Team	Category	Player	Statistics
No. 13 Oregon	Passing	Bo Nix	32/44, 359 yards, 2 TD
No. 13 Oregon	Rushing	Bo Nix	9 carries, 46 yards
No. 13 Oregon	Receiving	Troy Franklin	6 receptions, 103 yards, 1 TD
Texas Tech	Passing	Tyler Shough	24/38, 282 yards, 3 TD, 3 INT
Texas Tech	Rushing	Tyler Shough	23 carries, 101 yards, 1 TD
Texas Tech	Receiving	Jerand Bradley	5 receptions, 83 yards, 1 TD

=== vs. Hawai'i ===
Hawai'i Rainbow Warriors (1–2) at No. 13 Oregon Ducks (2–0) - Game summary

Quarter	1	2	3	4	Total
Hawai'i	0	3	0	7	10
No. 13 Oregon	24	10	14	7	55

at Autzen Stadium

- Date: September 16
- Game time: 8:00 p.m. EST/5:00 p.m. PST
- Game weather: Sunny • Temperature: 85 °F (29 °C) • Wind: 3 mph W
- Game attendance: 52,779
- Referee: Jeff Dahle
- TV announcers (Pac-12 Network): Ted Robinson (play-by-play) and Yogi Roth (analyst)

Game information

First quarter

- 14:02 ORE - Tez Johnson 49-yard pass from Bo Nix (Camden Lewis kick) - 7-0 Oregon, Drive: 2 plays, 59 yards, 0:33
- 12:24 ORE - Camden Lewis 43-yard field goal - 10-0 Oregon, Drive: 4 plays, 5 yards, 0:51
- 5:52 ORE - Jordan James 22-yard run (Camden Lewis kick) - 17-0 Oregon, Drive: 7 plays, 91 yards, 3:30
- 0:06 ORE - Traeshon Holden 1-yard pass from Bo Nix (Camden Lewis kick) - 24-0 Oregon, Drive: 10 plays, 67 yards, 4:10

Second quarter

- 12:01 ORE - Jordan James 3-yard run (Camden Lewis kick) - 31-0 Oregon, Drive: 5 plays, 54 yards, 1:32
- 3:21 ORE - Camden Lewis 22-yard field goal - 34-0 Oregon, Drive: 13 plays, 66 yards, 6:53
- 0:00 HAW - Matthew Shipley 29-yard field goal - 34-3 Oregon, Drive: 11 plays, 63 yards, 3:21

Third quarter

- 11:30 ORE - Tez Johnson 12-yard pass from Bo Nix (Camden Lewis kick) - 41-3 Oregon, Drive: 9 plays, 67 yards, 3:30
- 1:27 ORE - Noah Whittington 34-yard run (Camden Lewis kick) - 48-3 Oregon, Drive: 4 plays, 50 yards, 1:18

Fourth quarter

- 7:46 ORE - Traeshon Holden 60-yard pass from Ty Thompson (Camden Lewis kick) - 55-3 Oregon, Drive: 6 plays, 87 yards, 2:28
- 2:28 HAW - Alex Perry 1-yard pass from Brayden Schager (Matthew Shipley kick) - 55-10 Oregon, Drive: 10 plays, 75 yards, 5:18

Statistics	Hawai'i	No. 13 Oregon
First downs	15	25
Plays–yards	63–201	64–560
Rushes–yards	19–59	30–227
Passing yards	142	333
Passing: comp–att–int	28–44–1	26–34–0
Turnovers		
Time of possession	30:23	29:37

Team	Category	Player	Statistics
Hawai'i	Passing	Brayden Schager	27/43, 131 yards, 1 TD, 1 INT
Hawai'i	Rushing	Jordan Johnson	4 carries, 39 yards
Hawai'i	Receiving	Pofele Ashlock	8 receptions, 47 yards
No. 13 Oregon	Passing	Bo Nix	21/27, 247 yards, 3 TD
No. 13 Oregon	Rushing	Noah Whittington	5 carries, 80 yards, 1 TD
No. 13 Oregon	Receiving	Troy Franklin	4 receptions, 83 yards

=== vs. No. 19 Colorado ===
No. 19 Colorado Buffaloes (3–0) at No. 10 Oregon Ducks (3–0) - Game summary

Quarter	1	2	3	4	Total
No. 19 Colorado	0	0	0	6	6
No. 10 Oregon	13	22	7	0	42

at Autzen Stadium

- Date: September 23
- Game time: 3:30 p.m. EST/12:30 p.m. PST
- Game weather: Cloudy • Temperature: 66 °F (19 °C) • Wind: 4 mph W
- Game attendance: 59,889
- Referee: Matthew Richards
- TV announcers (ABC): Joe Tessitore (play-by-play), Jesse Palmer (analyst), and Katie George (sideline)

Game information

First quarter

- 10:15 ORE - Noah Whittington 3-yard run (Camden Lewis kick) - 7-0 Oregon, Drive: 10 plays, 72 yards, 4:45
- 2:41 ORE - Casey Kelly 1-yard pass from Bo Nix (Ross James two-point pass incomplete) - 13-0 Oregon, Drive: 11 plays, 52 yards, 6:22

Second quarter

- 9:39 ORE - Troy Franklin 16-yard pass from Bo Nix (Bo Nix two-point pass to Troy Franklin) - 21-0 Oregon, Drive: 13 plays, 89 yards, 5:41
- 2:52 ORE - Troy Franklin 36-yard pass from Bo Nix (Camden Lewis kick) - 28-0 Oregon, Drive: 5 plays, 82 yards, 2:10
- 0:12 ORE - Bo Nix 11-yard run (Camden Lewis kick) - 35-0 Oregon, Drive: 6 plays, 70 yards, 1:16

Third quarter

- 9:00 ORE - Jordan James 1-yard run (Camden Lewis kick) - 42-0 Oregon, Drive: 8 plays, 76 yards, 3:08

Fourth quarter

- 2:51 COLO - Michael Harrison 6-yard pass from Shedeur Sanders (Alejandro Mata kick blocked) - 42-6 Oregon, Drive: 14 plays, 93 yards, 5:20

Statistics	No. 19 Colorado	No. 10 Oregon
First downs	13	30
Plays–yards	58–199	73–522
Rushes–yards	25–40	38–240
Passing yards	159	282
Passing: comp–att–int	23–33–0	30–35–1
Turnovers		
Time of possession	24:54	35:06

Team	Category	Player	Statistics
No. 19 Colorado	Passing	Shedeur Sanders	23/33, 159 yards, 1 TD
No. 19 Colorado	Rushing	Anthony Hankerson	5 carries, 31 yards
No. 19 Colorado	Receiving	Xavier Weaver	9 receptions, 75 yards
No. 10 Oregon	Passing	Bo Nix	28/33, 276 yards, 3 TD, 1 INT
No. 10 Oregon	Rushing	Bucky Irving	10 carries, 89 yards
No. 10 Oregon	Receiving	Troy Franklin	8 receptions, 126 yards, 2 TD

=== at Stanford ===
No. 9 Oregon Ducks (4–0) at Stanford Cardinal (1–3) - Game summary

Quarter	1	2	3	4	Total
No. 9 Oregon	0	14	21	7	42
Stanford	3	3	0	0	6

at Stanford Stadium • Stanford, CA

- Date: September 30
- Game time: 6:30 p.m. EST/3:30 p.m. PST
- Game weather: Sunny, 64 °F (18 °C)
- Game attendance: 32,160
- Referee: John Love
- TV announcers (Pac-12 Network): Roxy Bernstein (play-by-play), Lincoln Kennedy (analyst)

Game information

First quarter

- 7:18 STAN - Joshua Karty 37-yard field goal - 3-0 Stanford, Drive: 15 plays, 46 yards, 7:42

Second quarter

- 14:55 STAN - Joshua Karty 53-yard field goal - 6-0 Stanford, Drive: 13 plays, 51 yards, 6:00
- 8:15 ORE - Jordan James 30-yard run (Camden Lewis kick) - 7-6 Oregon, Drive: 6 plays, 69 yards, 2:18
- 2:23 ORE - Bucky Irving 17-yard run (Camden Lewis kick) - 14-6 Oregon, Drive: 8 plays, 76 yards, 4:02

Third quarter

- 10:43 ORE - Terrance Ferguson 10-yard pass from Bo Nix (Camden Lewis kick) - 21-6 Oregon, Drive: 10 plays, 80 yards, 4:17
- 8:54 ORE - Troy Franklin 46-yard pass from Bo Nix (Camden Lewis kick) - 28-6 Oregon, Drive: 4 plays, 64 yards, 1:04
- 1:43 ORE - Troy Franklin 5-yard pass from Bo Nix (Camden Lewis kick) - 35-6 Oregon, Drive: 7 plays, 73 yards, 2:19

Fourth quarter

- 11:33 ORE - Traeshon Holden 9-yard pass from Bo Nix (Camden Lewis kick) - 42-6 Oregon, Drive: 7 plays, 59 yards, 2:41

Statistics	No. 9 Oregon	Stanford
First downs	26	16
Plays–yards	61–506	70–222
Rushes–yards	28–208	46–89
Passing yards	298	133
Passing: comp–att–int	28–33–0	14–24–0
Turnovers		
Time of possession	24:24	35:36

Team	Category	Player	Statistics
No. 9 Oregon	Passing	Bo Nix	27/32, 290 yards, 4 TD
No. 9 Oregon	Rushing	Bucky Irving	13 carries, 88 yards, 1 TD
No. 9 Oregon	Receiving	Troy Franklin	7 receptions, 117 yards, 2 TD
Stanford	Passing	Justin Lamson	11/20, 106 yards
Stanford	Rushing	Justin Lamson	22 carries, 32 yards
Stanford	Receiving	Mudia Reuben	4 receptions, 40 yards

=== at No. 7 Washington ===
No. 8 Oregon Ducks (5–0) at No. 7 Washington Huskies (5–0) – Game summary

Quarter	1	2	3	4	Total
No. 8 Ducks	8	10	8	7	33
No. 7 Huskies	14	8	7	7	36

at Husky Stadium • Seattle, WA

- Date: October 14
- Game time: 12:30 p.m.
- Game weather: Cloudy, 63 °F (17 °C), Wind: SE 5mph
- Game attendance: 71,321
- Referee: Mike McCabe
- TV announcers (ABC): Chris Fowler (play-by-play), Kirk Herbstreit (analyst), and Holly Rowe (sideline)

Game information

First quarter

Second quarter

Third quarter

Fourth quarter

Statistics	ORE	WASH
First downs	31	24
Plays–yards	84–541	61–415
Rushes–yards	40–204	23–99
Passing yards	337	316
Passing: comp–att–int	33–44–0	23–38–1
Turnovers		
Time of possession	34:21	25:39

Team	Category	Player	Statistics
Oregon	Passing	Bo Nix	33/44, 337 yards, 2 TD
Oregon	Rushing	Bucky Irving	22 carries, 127 yards, TD
Oregon	Receiving	Troy Franklin	8 receptions, 154 yards, TD
Washington	Passing	Michael Penix Jr.	22/37, 302 yards, 4 TD, INT
Washington	Rushing	Dillon Johnson	20 carries, 100 yards, TD
Washington	Receiving	Rome Odunze	8 receptions, 128 yards, 2 TD

=== vs Washington State ===
Washington State Cougars (4–2) vs No. 9 Oregon Ducks (5–1) - Game Summary

Quarter	1	2	3	4	Total
Cougars	3	10	3	8	24
No. 9 Ducks	3	14	14	7	38

at Autzen Stadium • Eugene, OR

- Date: October 21
- Game time: 12:30 p.m.
- Referee: Cravonne Barrett
- TV announcers (ABC): Bob Wischusen, Greg McElroy, Molly McGrath

Game information

First quarter

Second quarter

Third quarter

Fourth quarter

Statistics	WSU	ORE
First downs	21	20
Plays–yards	71–495	57–541
Rushes–yards	22–57	32–248
Passing yards	438	293
Passing: comp–att–int	34–49–0	18–25–0
Turnovers		
Time of possession	32:54	27:06

Team	Category	Player	Statistics
Washington State	Passing	Cam Ward	34/48, 438 yards, TD
Washington State	Rushing	Cam Ward	11 carries, 30 yards
Washington State	Receiving	Lincoln Victor	16 receptions, 161 yards
Oregon	Passing	Bo Nix	18/25, 293 yards, 2 TD
Oregon	Rushing	Bucky Irving	15 carries, 129 yards, 2 TD
Oregon	Receiving	Tez Johnson	6 receptions, 94 yards, TD

=== at No. 13 Utah ===
No. 8 Oregon Ducks (6–1) vs No. 13 Utah Utes (6–1) - Game Summary

Quarter	1	2	3	4	Total
No. 8 Ducks	14	7	14	0	35
No. 13 Utes	3	3	0	0	6

at Rice–Eccles Stadium • Salt Lake City, UT

- Date: October 28
- Game time: 12:30 p.m.
- Game weather: Cloudy, 40 °F (4 °C), W 9 mph
- Game attendance: 53,586
- Referee: Mark Duddy
- TV announcers (FOX/FOX Business (outside local team markets)): Gus Johnson (play-by-play) and Joel Klatt (analyst)

Game information

First quarter

- (12:18) ORE – Bo Nix 1-yard run, Camden Lewis kick (Drive: 6 plays, 75 yards, 2:42; Oregon 7–0)
- (3:45) UTAH – Cole Becker 32-yard field goal (Drive: 7 plays, 13 yards, 3:21; Oregon 7–3)
- (0:18) ORE – Jordan James 18-yard pass from Bo Nix, Camden Lewis kick (Drive: 9 plays, 75 yards, 3:27; Oregon 14–3)

Second quarter

- (12:29) ORE – Troy Franklin 3-yard pass from Bo Nix, Camden Lewis kick (Drive: 5 plays, 30 yards, 2:25; Oregon 21–3)
- (0:00) UTAH – Cole Becker 30-yard field goal (Drive: 10 plays, 53 yards, 1:22; Oregon 21–6)

Third quarter

- (8:44) ORE – Bucky Irving 9-yard run, Camden Lewis kick (Drive: 12 plays, 76 yards, 4:15; Oregon 28–6)
- (6:08) ORE – Traeshon Holden 5-yard run, Camden Lewis kick (Drive: 5 plays, 52 yards, 2:19; Oregon 35–6)

Fourth quarter

No scoring plays

Statistics	ORE	UTAH
First downs	18	13
Plays–yards	58–390	66–241
Rushes–yards	27–142	36–99
Passing yards	248	142
Passing: comp–att–int	24–31–0	16–30–2
Turnovers		
Time of possession	28:03	31:57

Team	Category	Player	Statistics
Oregon	Passing	Bo Nix	24/31, 248 yards, 2 TD
Oregon	Rushing	Bucky Irving	14 carries, 83 yards, TD
Oregon	Receiving	Troy Franklin	8 receptions, 99 yards, TD
Utah	Passing	Bryson Barnes	15/29, 136 yards, 2 INT
Utah	Rushing	Jaylon Glover	9 carries, 39 yards
Utah	Receiving	Devaughn Vele	7 receptions, 80 yards

=== California ===
California Golden Bears (3–5) at No. 6 Oregon Ducks (7–1) - Game summary

Quarter	1	2	3	4	Total
Golden Bears	10	3	6	0	19
No. 6 Ducks	14	21	7	21	63

at Autzen Stadium • Eugene, OR

- Date: November 4, 2023
- Game time: 2:30 p.m.
- Game attendance: 54,046
- TV: Pac-12 Network

Game information

First quarter

Second quarter

Third quarter

Fourth quarter

Statistics	CAL	ORE
First downs	16	32
Plays–yards	63–286	82–597
Rushes–yards	29–109	36–153
Passing yards	177	444
Passing: comp–att–int	18–34–1	35–46–1
Turnovers		
Time of possession	23:26	36:34

Team	Category	Player	Statistics
California	Passing	Fernando Mendoza	18/34, 177 yards, INT
California	Rushing	Jaydn Ott	20 carries, 93 yards, TD
California	Receiving	Jeremiah Hunter	5 receptions, 64 yards
Oregon	Passing	Bo Nix	29/38, 386 yards, 4 TD, INT
Oregon	Rushing	Bucky Irving	18 carries, 89 yards, TD
Oregon	Receiving	Tez Johnson	12 receptions, 180 yards, 2 TD

=== USC ===
USC Trojans (7–3) at No. 6 Oregon Ducks (8–1) – Game summary

Quarter	1	2	3	4	Total
Trojans	7	7	0	13	27
No. 6 Ducks	13	9	7	7	36

at Autzen Stadium • Eugene, OR

- Date: November 11, 2023
- Game time: 7:30 p.m.
- Game weather: Cloudy, 51 °F (11 °C)
- Game attendance: 59,957
- Referee: Matthew Richards
- TV announcers (FOX/FOX Business (outside local team markets)): Tim Brando, Spencer Tillman, Josh Sims

Game information

First quarter

Second quarter

Third quarter

Fourth quarter

Statistics	USC	ORE
First downs	21	25
Total yards	379	552
Rushes/yards	25-73	31-140
Passing yards	306	412
Passing: Comp–Att–Int	20-35-0	23-32-0
Time of possession	29:18	30:42

Team	Category	Player	Statistics
USC	Passing	Caleb Williams	19-34 291 yards, TD
USC	Rushing	MarShawn Lloyd	9 carries, 37 yards, TD
USC	Receiving	Tahj Washington	4 receptions, 82 yards
Oregon	Passing	Bo Nix	23-31 412 yards, 4 TD
Oregon	Rushing	Bucky Irving	19 carries, 118 yards, TD
Oregon	Receiving	Troy Franklin	2 receptions, 147 yards, TD

=== at Arizona State ===
No. 6 Oregon Ducks (9–1) vs Arizona State Sun Devils (3–7) – Game summary

Quarter	1	2	3	4	Total
No. 6 Ducks	21	21	0	7	49
Sun Devils	0	0	3	10	13

at Mountain America Stadium • Tempe, AZ

- Date: November 18, 2023
- Game time: 1:00 p.m. PST
- Game attendance: 44,741
- Referee: Cravonne Barrett
- TV: FOX

Statistics	ORE	ASU
First downs	31	20
Total yards	603	316
Rushes/yards	33-140	18–11
Passing yards	463	205
Passing: Comp–Att–Int	28-36-2	25–47–1
Time of possession	32:58	27:02

Team	Category	Player	Statistics
Oregon	Passing	Bo Nix	24–29, 404 yards, 6 TD
Oregon	Rushing	Bucky Irving	11 carries, 63 yards
Oregon	Receiving	Troy Franklin	8 receptions, 128 yards, 2 TD
Arizona State	Passing	Trenton Bourguet	20–37, 142 yards
Arizona State	Rushing	Cameron Skattebo	8 carries, 49 yards
Arizona State	Receiving	Elijhah Badger	7 receptions, 64 yards

=== Oregon State ===
No. 16 Oregon State Beavers (8–3) vs No. 6 Oregon Ducks (10–1) - Game Summary

Quarter	1	2	3	4	Total
No. 16 Beavers	0	7	0	0	7
No. 6 Ducks	7	14	3	7	31

at Autzen Stadium • Eugene, Oregon

- Date: November 24
- Game time: 5:30 p.m.
- Game weather: Clear, 39 °F (4 °C), W 4 mph
- Game attendance: 59,987
- Referee: Chris Wiggins
- TV announcers (FOX): Jason Benetti (play-by-play) and Brock Huard (analyst)

Game information

First quarter

- (6:19) ORE – Bucky Irving 14-yard pass from Bo Nix, Camden Lewis kick (Drive: 15 plays, 88 yards, 8:41; Oregon 7–0)

Second quarter

- (14:20) ORE – Bo Nix 16-yard run, Camden Lewis kick (Drive: 8 plays, 58 yards, 3:13; Oregon 14–0)
- (0:54) OSU – Silas Bolden 9-yard pass from DJ Uiagalelei, Atticus Sappington kick (Drive: 15 plays, 80 yards, 5:37; Oregon 14–7)
- (0:08) ORE – Troy Franklin 41-yard pass from Bo Nix, Camden Lewis kick (Drive: 5 plays, 78 yards, 0:40; Oregon 21–7)

Third quarter

- (6:01) ORE – Camden Lewis 25-yard field goal (Drive: 8 plays, 64 yards, 3:25; Oregon 24–7)

Fourth quarter

- (14:37) ORE – Jordan James 1-yard run, Camden Lewis kick (Drive: 12 plays, 82 yards, 4:53; Oregon 31–7)

Statistics	OSU	ORE
First downs	17	28
Plays–yards	59–273	68–480
Rushes–yards	24–53	28–113
Passing yards	220	367
Passing: comp–att–int	19–35–1	33–40–0
Turnovers		
Time of possession	25:57	34:03

Team	Category	Player	Statistics
Oregon State	Passing	DJ Uiagalelei	19/35, 220 yards, TD, INT
Oregon State	Rushing	Damien Martinez	13 carries, 38 yards
Oregon State	Receiving	Anthony Gould	6 receptions, 85 yards
Oregon	Passing	Bo Nix	33/40, 367 yards, 2 TD
Oregon	Rushing	Jordan James	7 carries, 43 yards, TD
Oregon	Receiving	Tez Johnson	11 receptions, 137 yards

=== vs No. 3 Washington (Pac-12 Championship Game) ===
No. 5 Oregon Ducks (11-1) vs No. 3 Washington Huskies (12-0) – Game summary

Quarter	1	2	3	4	Total
No. 5 Ducks	0	10	14	7	31
No. 3 Huskies	10	10	0	14	34

at Allegiant Stadium • Paradise, NV

- Date: December 1
- Game time: 5:00 p.m.
- Game weather: Indoor, 65 °F (18 °C)
- Game attendance: 61,195
- Referee: Mike McCabe
- TV announcers (ABC): Chris Fowler (play-by-play), Kirk Herbstreit (color), and Holly Rowe (sideline)

Game information

First quarter

- (7:34) WASH – Grady Gross 38-yard field goal (Drive: 15 plays, 54 yards, 7:26; Washington 3–0)
- (3:46) WASH – Dillon Johnson 5-yard run, Grady Gross kick (Drive: 6 plays, 50 yards, 3:23; Washington 10–0)

Second quarter

- (8:46) ORE – Camden Lewis 36-yard field goal (Drive: 12 plays, 72 yards, 6:02; Washington 10–3)
- (6:48) WASH – Germie Bernard 4-yard pass from Dillon Johnson, Grady Gross kick (Drive: 4 plays, 75 yards, 1:58; Washington 17–3)
- (1:39) WASH – Grady Gross 37-yard field goal (Drive: 8 plays, 64 yards, 2:58; Washington 20–3)

Third quarter

- (9:39) ORE – Terrance Ferguson 2-yard pass from Bo Nix, Camden Lewis kick (Drive: 15 plays, 75 yards, 5:21; Washington 20–17)
- (1:51) ORE – Jordan James 6-yard run, Camden Lewis kick (Drive: 3 plays, 62 yards, 1:30; Oregon 24–20)

Fourth quarter

- (12:23) WASH – Dillon Johnson 1-yard run, Grady Gross kick (Drive: 10 plays, 75 yards, 4:28; Washington 27–24)
- (2:44) WASH – Quentin Moore 2-yard pass from Michael Penix Jr., Grady Gross kick (Drive: 12 plays, 82 yards, 6:20; Washington 34–24)
- (2:14) ORE – Traeshon Holden 63-yard pass from Bo Nix, Camden Lewis kick (Drive: 2 plays, 75 yards, 0:30; Washington 34–31)

Statistics	ORE	WAS
First downs	17	26
Plays–yards	54–363	78–481
Rushes–yards	20–124	37–157
Passing yards	239	324
Passing: comp–att–int	21–34–1	29–41–1
Turnovers		
Time of possession	22:52	37:08

Team	Category	Player	Statistics
Oregon	Passing	Bo Nix	21/34, 239 yards, 3 TDs, 1 INT
Oregon	Rushing	Bo Nix	6 carries, 69 yards
Oregon	Receiving	Tez Johnson	5 receptions, 68 yards
Washington	Passing	Michael Penix	27/39, 319 yards, 1 TD, 1 INT
Washington	Rushing	Dillon Johnson	28 carries, 152 yards, 2 TDs
Washington	Receiving	Jalen McMillan	9 receptions, 131 yards

=== vs No. 23 Liberty (Fiesta Bowl) ===
2024 Vrbo Fiesta Bowl
No. 23 Liberty Flames (13-0, 8-0) vs No. 8 Oregon Ducks (11-2, 8-1) – Game summary

Quarter	1	2	3	4	Total
No. 23 Flames	6	0	0	0	6
No. 8 Ducks	3	28	7	7	45

at State Farm Stadium • Glendale, Arizona

- Date: Monday, January 1st, 2024
- Game time: 12:00 pm EST/11:00 pm MST/9:00 am PST
- Game weather: Indoors
- Game attendance: 47.769
- Referee: Steve Marlowe
- TV announcers (ESPN): Bob Wischusen (play-by-play), Robert Griffin III (analyst), and Kris Budden (sideline)

Game information

First quarter

- (12:37) LIB Bentley Hanshaw 17-yd pass from Kaidon Salter, Nick Brown kick failed (LIB 6-0)
- (9:06) ORE Camden Lewis 37-yd field goal (LIB 6-3)

Second quarter

- (12:53) ORE Gary Bryant Jr. 2-yd pass from Bo Nix, Camden Lewis kick (ORE 10-6)
- (7:13) ORE Terrance Ferguson 2-yd pass from Bo Nix, Camden Lewis kick (ORE 17-6)
- (3:50) ORE Kenyon Sadiq 3-yd pass from Bo Nix, Camden Lewis kick (ORE 24-6)
- (0:03), ORE Traeshon Holden 17-yd pass from Bo Nix, Camden Lewis kick (ORE 31-6)

Third quarter

- (11:11) ORE Traeshon Holden 24-yd pass from Bo Nix, Camden Lewis kick (ORE 38-6)

Fourth quarter

- (14:13) ORE Bucky Irving 1-yd run, Grant Meadors kick (ORE 45-6)

Statistics	No. 23 Liberty	No. 8 Oregon
First downs	15	28
Plays–yards	52–294	71–584
Rushes–yards	28–168	29–183
Passing yards	126	401
Passing: comp–att–int	15–24–1	33–42–0
Turnovers		
Time of possession	24:45	35:15

Team	Category	Player	Statistics
No. 23 Liberty	Passing	Kaidon Salter	15/24, 126 yards, TD, INT
No. 23 Liberty	Rushing	Quinton Cooley	8 carries, 79 yards
No. 23 Liberty	Receiving	CJ Daniels	8 receptions, 79 yards
No. 8 Oregon	Passing	Bo Nix	28/35, 363 yards, 5 TDs
No. 8 Oregon	Rushing	Bucky Irving	14 carries, 117 yards, TD
No. 8 Oregon	Receiving	Tez Johnson	11 receptions, 172 yards, TD

== Rankings ==
Ranking movements Legend: ██ Increase in ranking ██ Decrease in ranking т = Tied with team above or below
	Week															
Poll	Pre	1	2	3	4	5	6	7	8	9	10	11	12	13	14	Final
AP	15	13	13	10	9	8	8	9	8	6	6	6	6	5	8	6т
Coaches	15	13	13	11	9	9	8	11	9	7	6	6	6	5	8	7
CFP	Not released									6	6	6	6	5	8	Not released
