= Austin Novosad =

American football player (born 2004)

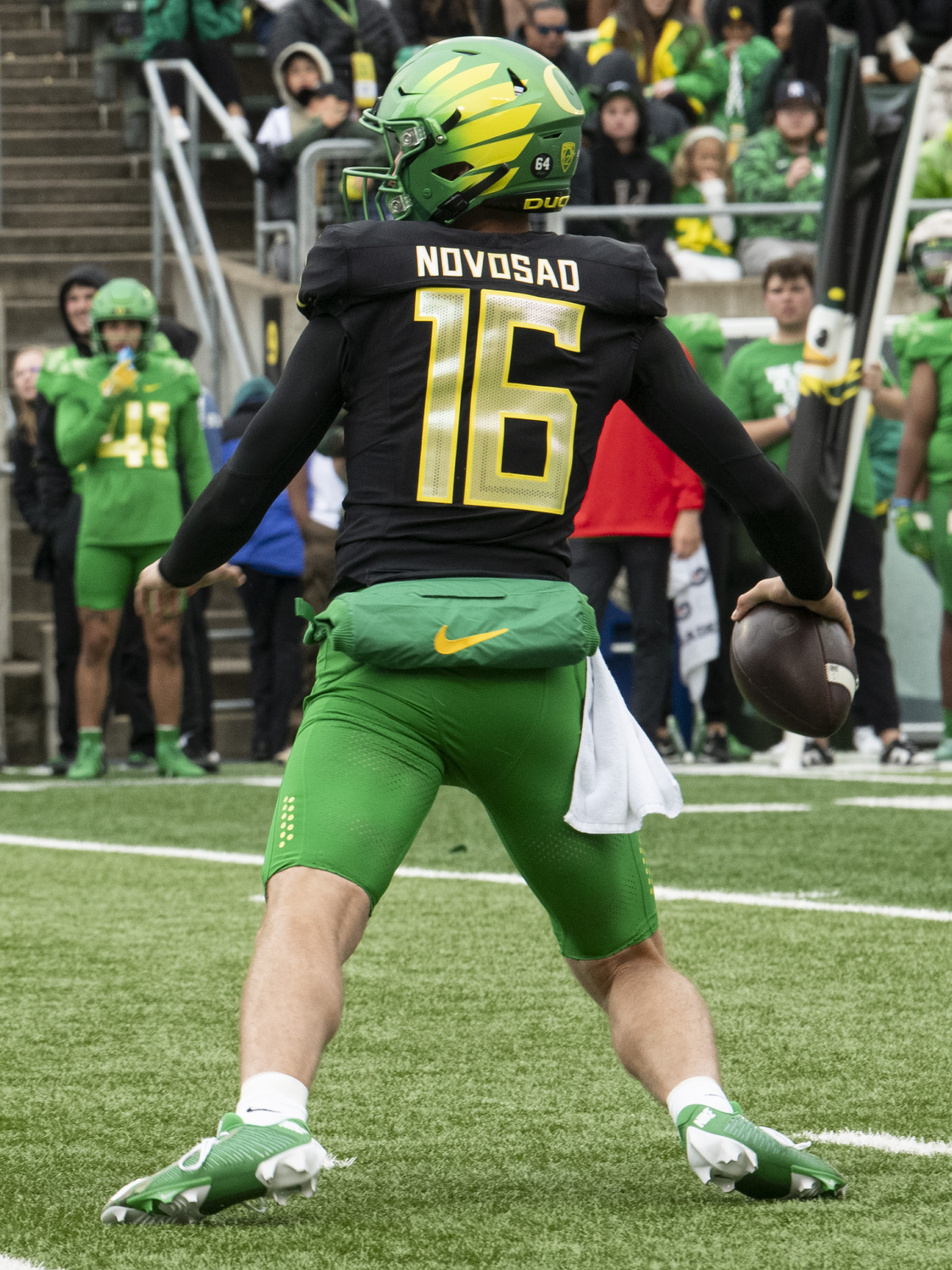

No. 16 – Bowling Green Falcons
- Position: Quarterback
- Class: Redshirt Junior

Personal information
- Born: October 6, 2004 (age 22)
- Listed height: 6 ft 3 in (1.91 m)
- Listed weight: 205 lb (93 kg)

Career information
- High school: Dripping Springs (Dripping Springs, Texas)
- College: Oregon (2023–2025); Bowling Green (2026–present)
- Stats at ESPN

Austin Novosad (born October 6, 2004) is an American college football quarterback for the Bowling Green Falcons. He previously played for the Oregon Ducks.

== Early life ==
Novosad attended Dripping Springs High School in Dripping Springs, Texas. As a junior in 2021, he was the District 12-5A MVP after passing for 3,399 yards and 40 touchdowns. He finished his high school career completing 563 of 873 passes for 8,983 yards and 114 touchdowns. A four-star recruit, Novosad was selected to play in the 2023 All-American Bowl. He originally committed to play college football at Baylor University before flipping his commitment to the University of Oregon.

== College career ==
=== Oregon ===
Novosad entered the 2023 season as the third-string quarterback behind starter Bo Nix and Ty Thompson. In the season opener against Portland State, Novosad relieved Thompson and completed all three of his passes for 13 yards in the victory in his Ducks debut. In the 2024 Fiesta Bowl, he went five of seven passing for 38 yards in a victory over Liberty. On the season, he appeared in three games, completing nine of 11 passes for 52 yards while preserving his redshirt.

In the 2024 season, Novosad entered the season as the third-string quarterback behind starter Dillon Gabriel and Dante Moore. He appeared in three games and completed both of his pass attempts for seven yards.

In the 2025 season, Novosad competed with Moore for the starting quarterback position, with Moore ultimately being named the starter. Novosad began the season as the primary backup and appeared in the season opener, completing one of two passes for 40 yards during a touchdown-scoring drive against Montana State. Over three seasons, he appeared in seven games, completing 12 of 15 passes for 99 yards. On December 27, 2025, Novosad entered the NCAA transfer portal.

=== Bowling Green ===
On January 17, 2026, Novosad transferred to Bowling Green.

=== Statistics ===
Year	Team	Games			Passing								Rushing			
Year	Team	GP	GS	Record	Cmp	Att	Pct	Yds	Y/A	TD	Int	Rtg	Att	Yds	Avg	TD
2023	Oregon	3	0	—	9	11	81.8	52	4.7	0	0	121.5	0	0	0.0	0
2024	Oregon	3	0	—	2	2	100.0	7	3.5	0	0	129.4	0	0	0.0	0
2025	Oregon	1	0	—	1	2	50.0	40	20.0	0	0	218.0	0	0	0.0	0
2026	Bowling Green	4	1	1–0	18	32	56.3	249	7.8	3	0	156.2	3	-24	-8.0	0
Career		11	1	1−0	30	47	63.8	348	7.4	3	0	147.1	3	-24	-8.0	0
