= Khyree Jackson =

American football player (1999–2024)

- Image of Jackson from a 2024 Instagram post

No. 31
- Position: Cornerback

Personal information
- Born: August 11, 1999; Washington, D.C., U.S.
- Died: July 6, 2024 (aged 24); Upper Marlboro, Maryland, U.S.
- Listed height: 6 ft 4 in (1.93 m)
- Listed weight: 194 lb (88 kg)

Career information
- High school: Wise (Upper Marlboro)
- College: Fort Scott (2019); Alabama (2021–2022); Oregon (2023)
- NFL draft: 2024: 4th round, 108th overall pick

Career history
- Minnesota Vikings (2024)*
- * Offseason or practice squad member only

Awards and highlights
- First-team All-Pac-12 (2023)
- Stats at Pro Football Reference

Khyree Anthony Jackson (August 11, 1999 – July 6, 2024) was an American football player.

Born in Washington, D.C., Jackson won a state championship with Dr. Henry A. Wise Jr. High School in 2018. He temporarily quit football after dropping out of Arizona Western College but returned the next year, switching from wide receiver to cornerback partway through his year with the Fort Scott CC Greyhounds. He transferred to the Oregon Ducks after two seasons with the Alabama Crimson Tide, earning All-Pac-12 honors in 2023. The Minnesota Vikings selected him in the fourth round of the 2024 NFL draft, as the 108th overall pick, but after being drafted he was killed in a traffic collision in Maryland.

== Early life ==
Jackson was born August 11, 1999, in Washington, D.C., to Raymond and Ebbony Jackson. He took up track and field at the age of five and progressed to flag football two years later. Initially a student and football player at Springbrook High School in White Oak, Maryland, Jackson transferred to Dr. Henry A. Wise Jr. High School in Upper Marlboro partway through his sophomore year. After transferring, Jackson missed the 2015 season with a clavicle fracture. As a senior in 2018, Jackson made 39 receptions for 612 yards and 12 touchdowns, playing both wide receiver and defensive back on a Wise team that went undefeated en route to the MPSSAA Maryland 4A state championship.

== College career ==
=== Fort Scott CC (2019) ===
Jackson did not receive any athletic scholarship offers out of high school, and poor grades further limited his college opportunities. Although he signed with Arizona Western College to play football for the Matadors, Jackson became homesick and secretly dropped out of school before playing a single game. While out of school and living in Upper Marlboro with his parents, he took up jobs at Six Flags America, Chipotle Mexican Grill, and Harris Teeter. At the time Jackson, as an avid NBA 2K player, contemplated a career in esports.

In 2019, after receiving an email invitation from coach Kale Pick to play as a wide receiver for Fort Scott Community College, Jackson enrolled and joined its college football team. Although he had been recruited as a wide receiver, Jackson was more interested in playing cornerback, and he convinced the Fort Scott Greyhounds coaching staff to let him change positions partway through the season. In his one season with the Greyhounds, Jackson recorded 25 tackles and three interceptions, becoming a top junior college prospect in the process.

=== Alabama (2021–2022) ===
A coaching change at Fort Scott prompted Jackson to transfer to East Mississippi Community College to solidify an NCAA Division I opportunity. When the 2020 football season was canceled due to the effects of the COVID-19 pandemic, East Mississippi head coach Buddy Stephens connected Jackson to Freddie Roach and Nick Saban. After receiving offers from programs such as Oklahoma, Florida, Tennessee, and Auburn, Jackson committed to the Alabama Crimson Tide in August 2020 and signed with them that December. He made his Alabama debut on September 4, playing defensive back and taking a special teams role in the Crimson Tide's season-opening 44–13 victory over Miami. Used mostly on special teams, Jackson made his first start for Alabama in the 2022 College Football Playoff National Championship against Georgia, following injuries to Josh Jobe and Jalyn Armour-Davis. He recorded two tackles and one pass deflection in the 33–18 loss. Appearing in 12 games during the 2021 season, Jackson finished with seven tackles and two pass deflections.

Jackson entered the 2022 season as a co-starter with Terrion Arnold at one cornerback position, but ultimately filled a reserve role behind Arnold and Eli Ricks. He made one start that season, in Alabama's 20–19 victory over Texas on September 10. Jackson recorded three tackles in that game, including one on punt coverage and one on kickoff. After Jackson missed Alabama's games against Ole Miss and Austin Peay, Saban informed reporters that the cornerback was suspended, but he did not elaborate on the reasons or a timeline of the suspension. In the nine games he played before his suspension, Jackson recorded seven tackles, including one for a 2-yard loss.

=== Oregon (2023) ===
When the undergraduate NCAA transfer portal opened for the season on December 5, 2022, Jackson entered into the database. He committed to the Oregon Ducks on December 18, choosing the school in part due to his relationship with head coach Dan Lanning. He entered the 2023 season as Oregon's starting cornerback, replacing Christian Gonzalez who had been taken in the 2023 NFL draft. Jackson started all 12 games for the Ducks during the 2023 season, allowing only 19 receptions for 200 yards while recording 34 tackles, two quarterback sacks, and a team-leading three interceptions. He was one of nine Ducks named to the 2023 All-Pac-12 Conference football team, receiving first team defense honors. Although Oregon was named to the 2024 Fiesta Bowl, Jackson sat out the game to prepare for the 2024 NFL draft.

=== College statistics ===
Year	Team	League	Games		Tackles				Interceptions						Fumbles			
Year	Team	League	GP	GS	Cmb	Solo	Ast	Sck	PD	Int	Yds	Avg	Lng	TD	FF	FR	Yds	TD
2019	Fort Scott CC	NJCAA	8	8	25	22	3	0	0	3	45	15.0	0	0	0	0	0	0
2021	Alabama	NCAA	12	12	7	5	2	0	2	0	0	0	0	0	0	0	0	0
2022	Alabama	NCAA	9	9	8	6	1	0	0	0	0	0	0	0	0	0	0	0
2023	Oregon	NCAA	12	12	35	25	10	2	7	3	7	2.3	7	0	0	0	0	0
NCAA career			33	33	50	36	12	2	9	3	7	2.3	7	0	0	0	0	0

== Professional career ==
Pre-draft measurables
Height	Weight	Arm length	Hand span	Wingspan	40-yard dash	10-yard split	20-yard split	Vertical jump	Broad jump	Bench press
6 ft 3 3/4 in (1.92 m)	194 lb (88 kg)	32 3/4 in (0.83 m)	9 1/4 in (0.23 m)	6 ft 6 in (1.98 m)	4.50 s	1.50 s	2.67 s	36.5 in (0.93 m)	11 ft 1 in (3.38 m)	11 reps
All values from NFL Scouting Combine and Pro Day

Jackson was one of seven Oregon football players to receive an invitation from the National Football League (NFL) to that year's NFL Scouting Combine. As a runner, he performed better in short distance bursts than at the 40-yard dash, and his 11-foot-1-inch (3.38 m) standing long jump was third among 26 players tested. The NFL scouting report on Jackson questioned his inconsistent technique while praising his size and physicality. Jackson also participated in Oregon's Pro Day, with a strong performance during defensive individual drills.

The Minnesota Vikings selected Jackson in the fourth round of the 2024 NFL draft, as the 108th overall pick. Although the Vikings had an established cornerback group in Byron Murphy, Shaquill Griffin, and Mekhi Blackmon, they were searching for another young player to develop at the position. Jackson signed with the Vikings on May 29, 2024.

== Death ==
At 3:14 a.m. (ET) on July 6, 2024, Jackson and two of his high school football teammates were killed in a traffic collision in Prince George's County, Maryland. Jackson was the front passenger in a Dodge Charger headed north on Maryland Route 4 when it was struck by an Infiniti Q50 changing lanes at high speed. The Charger went off-road and struck several tree stumps before coming to a stop. Jackson and the Charger's driver were pronounced dead at the scene, while the other passenger was transported to the University of Maryland Medical Center and died there.

A candlelight vigil was held for Jackson and his teammates on July 12 at Wise High School. While leaving the vigil, a man was killed and a woman injured in a parking lot shooting. Jackson's funeral service took place on July 26, in Glenarden, Maryland, and was attended by Vikings head coach Kevin O'Connell, general manager Kwesi Adofo-Mensah, and other members of the Vikings coaching staff. During the 2024 season, all members of the Vikings wore helmet decals with Jackson's initials, while coaches and staff members wore pins with the same design. Additionally, Jackson's locker and No. 31 uniform number were both unassigned, and the Vikings paid his signing bonus to his estate.

On January 25, 2025, the driver of the Infiniti Q50 was indicted by grand jury on 13 charges, including vehicular manslaughter and driving under the influence. That November, she pled guilty to three counts of negligent homicide under the influence of alcohol, for which she was sentenced to three years in prison.

== See also ==
- List of gridiron football players who died during their careers
