= Myles Bradley =

American college football defensive end

No. 23 – Bowling Green Falcons
- Position: Defensive end

Personal information
- Listed height: 6 ft 0 in (1.83 m)
- Listed weight: 230 lb (104 kg)

Career information
- High school: Mansfield (Mansfield, Ohio)
- College: Bowling Green (2022–present)

Myles Bradley is an American college football defensive end for the Bowling Green Falcons.

== Early life ==
Bradley is from Mansfield, Ohio, and attended Mansfield Senior High School, where he competed in football and basketball. In football, he played under his father, Chioke, who served as head coach. He was a three-time all-district and all-conference selection, being named first-team all-conference twice. As a senior, Bradley had 847 receiving yards and nine touchdowns along with 66 tackles and four interceptions, being named first-team Division III all-state and the Division III Northwest District Offensive Player of the Year. He committed to play college football for the Bowling Green Falcons and became a defensive end.

== College career ==
Bradley redshirted as a true freshman at Bowling Green in 2022. The following year, he posted four tackles while playing in three games. In 2024, Bradley recorded 21 tackles, two tackles-for-loss (TFLs) and a sack while playing in 13 games. He then tallied 20 tackles, 5.5 TFLs and five sacks during the 2025 season. After initially entering the NCAA transfer portal, Bradley returned to the Falcons for his final season in 2026. In the fourth game of the 2026 season, against South Florida, he posted 4.5 sacks, a single-game Bowling Green record, and earned Mid-American Conference (MAC) Defensive Player of the Week honors. In the tenth game of the season, against Kent State, Bradley broke the record again while posting five sacks. His five sacks against Kent State put him at 14 on the season, placing first in college football.
