= Jamal Rule =

American football player

No. 25 – Nebraska Cornhuskers
- Position: Running back
- Class: Freshman

Personal information
- Listed height: 6 ft 0 in (1.83 m)
- Listed weight: 215 lb (98 kg)

Career information
- High school: Charlotte Christian (Charlotte, North Carolina)
- College: Nebraska (2026–present)
- Stats at ESPN

Jamal Rule is an American football running back for the Nebraska Cornhuskers.

== Early life ==
Rule attended Charlotte Christian School in Charlotte, North Carolina. He was rated a three-star recruit by 247Sports and committed to play college football for the Nebraska Cornhuskers over offers from Michigan State, Syracuse, and Virginia Tech.

== College career ==
Heading into his freshman season in 2026, Rule competed for the Cornhuskers starting running back job. In the team's spring scrimmage, he totaled 136 yards and a touchdown on 11 touches. In the season opener, Rule ran for 122 yards and two touchdowns on 16 carries and caught two passes for 47 yards and a touchdown in a win over Ohio.

Injured first quarter with a high leg sprain at MSU with little information from the coaches regarding his overall health
