= Tysheem Johnson =

American football player (born 2002)

Profile
- Position: Safety

Personal information
- Born: September 30, 2002 (age 24); Philadelphia, Pennsylvania, U.S.
- Listed height: 5 ft 10 in (1.78 m)
- Listed weight: 195 lb (88 kg)

Career information
- High school: Neumann Goretti (Philadelphia, Pennsylvania)
- College: Ole Miss (2021–2022); Oregon (2023–2024)
- NFL draft: 2025: undrafted

Career history
- Chicago Bears (2025)*; Atlanta Falcons (2025)*; Seattle Seahawks (2026)*
- * Offseason or practice squad member only
- Stats at Pro Football Reference

Tysheem Terrance Johnson (born September 30, 2002) is an American professional football safety. He played college football for the Ole Miss Rebels and Oregon Ducks.

== Early life ==
Johnson attended Saints John Neumann and Maria Goretti Catholic High School in Philadelphia, Pennsylvania. Rated as a four-star recruit, he committed to play college football for the Ole Miss Rebels.

== College career ==
=== Ole Miss ===
As a freshman in 2021, Johnson appeared in ten games for the Rebels, where he notched 47 tackles with four being for a loss, a sack, a pass deflection, and an interception, where for his performance he was named to the all-freshman SEC team. In 2022, Johnson appeared in 13 games with nine starts, notching 78 tackles with four being for a loss and two pass deflections. After the season, Johnson entered his name into the NCAA transfer portal.

=== Oregon ===
Johnson transferred to play for the Oregon Ducks. In week 9 of the 2023 season, he recorded two tackles and two interceptions in a win over Utah. Johnson finished the 2023 season with 70 tackles with five being for a loss, a sack, seven pass deflections, and two interceptions.

== Professional career ==
Pre-draft measurables
Height	Weight	Arm length	Hand span	Wingspan	40-yard dash	10-yard split	20-yard split	20-yard shuttle	Three-cone drill	Vertical jump	Broad jump	Bench press
5 ft 9 5/8 in (1.77 m)	195 lb (88 kg)	30 3/4 in (0.78 m)	8 3/4 in (0.22 m)	6 ft 0 5/8 in (1.84 m)	4.51 s	1.58 s	2.60 s	4.46 s	7.47 s	35.0 in (0.89 m)	9 ft 9 in (2.97 m)	9 reps
All values from Pro Day

=== Chicago Bears ===
Johnson signed with the Chicago Bears as an undrafted free agent on May 8, 2025. He was waived on August 26 with an injury designation.

=== Atlanta Falcons ===
On December 22, 2025, the Atlanta Falcons signed Johnson to their practice squad. He signed a reserve/future contract with Atlanta on January 5, 2026. He was waived by the Falcons on May 7.

=== Seattle Seahawks ===
On August 25, 2026, Johnson signed with the Seattle Seahawks. On August 30, he was waived by the Seahawks as a part of final roster cuts.
