= 2023 Michigan Wolverines football team =

American college football season

2023 Michigan Wolverines football

Consensus national champion Big Ten champion Big Ten East Division champion Rose Bowl champion

Big Ten Championship Game, W 26–0 vs. Iowa

Rose Bowl (CFP Semifinal), W 27–20 ^{OT} vs. Alabama CFP National Championship, W 34–13 vs. Washington
- Conference: Big Ten Conference
- East Division

Ranking
- Coaches: No. 1
- AP: No. 1
- Record: 15–0 (9–0 Big Ten)
- Head coach: Jim Harbaugh (9th season; games 4–9, 13–15); Sherrone Moore (games 3, 10–12); Jesse Minter (game 1), Jay Harbaugh (game 2, 1st half), and Mike Hart (game 2, 2nd half)
- Offensive coordinator: Sherrone Moore (3rd season)
- Offensive scheme: Pro spread
- Defensive coordinator: Jesse Minter (2nd season)
- Co-defensive coordinator: Steve Clinkscale (2nd season)
- Base defense: 4–2–5
- MVP: J. J. McCarthy
- Captains: Mike Sainristil; Blake Corum; Kris Jenkins Jr.; Trevor Keegan; Michael Barrett; Zak Zinter
- Home stadium: Michigan Stadium

Uniform
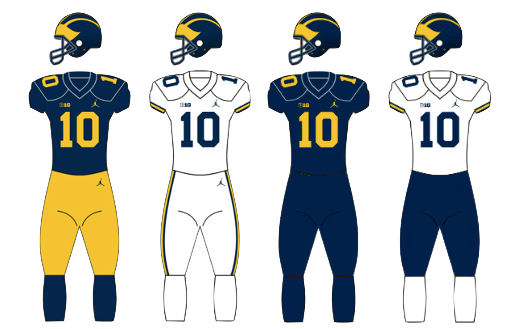

2023 Big Ten Conference football standings
| | Conf. | | | Overall |
| Team | W | | L | W | | L |
|---|---|---|---|---|---|---|
East Division
| No. 1 Michigan xy$#^ | 9 | – | 0 | 15 | – | 0 |
| No. 10 Ohio State | 8 | – | 1 | 11 | – | 2 |
| No. 13 Penn State | 7 | – | 2 | 10 | – | 3 |
| Maryland | 4 | – | 5 | 8 | – | 5 |
| Rutgers | 3 | – | 6 | 7 | – | 6 |
| Indiana | 1 | – | 8 | 3 | – | 9 |
| Michigan State† | 0 | – | 7 | 0 | – | 8 |
West Division
| No. 24 Iowa xy | 7 | – | 2 | 10 | – | 4 |
| Northwestern | 5 | – | 4 | 8 | – | 5 |
| Wisconsin | 5 | – | 4 | 7 | – | 6 |
| Minnesota | 3 | – | 6 | 6 | – | 7 |
| Illinois | 3 | – | 6 | 5 | – | 7 |
| Nebraska | 3 | – | 6 | 5 | – | 7 |
| Purdue | 3 | – | 6 | 4 | – | 8 |
Championship: Michigan 26, Iowa 0
# – College Football Playoff champion; ^ – College Football Playoff participant; $ – Conference champion; x – Division champion/co-champions; y – Championship game participant; † — NCAA vacated all wins for Michigan State (4–8, 2–7); Rankings from AP Poll

The 2023 Michigan Wolverines football team represented the University of Michigan in the East Division of the Big Ten Conference during the 2023 NCAA Division I FBS football season. In their ninth and final year under head coach Jim Harbaugh, the Wolverines compiled a perfect 15–0 record, outscored opponents by a total of 538 to 156, and won their third consecutive Big Ten championship with a 26–0 victory over Iowa in the Big Ten Championship Game. They defeated No. 4 Alabama, 27–20 in overtime, in the 2024 Rose Bowl. The Wolverines then defeated No. 2 Washington, 34–13, in the 2024 College Football Playoff National Championship to claim their first College Football Playoff (CFP) title and 12th national championship in program history, the first since 1997, and the first consensus national championship since 1948. With a win against Maryland on November 18, Michigan became the first program in college football history to reach 1,000 wins.

Michigan was the first national champion to have a lead at halftime in every game it played since the 2001 Miami Hurricanes. The Wolverines are the first team in Big Ten football history to complete a 15–0 season and the fourth NCAA Division I Football Bowl Subdivision (FBS) team to do so following Clemson in 2018, LSU in 2019, and Georgia in 2022. Michigan finished ranked No. 1 in the AP for the first time since 1997, and finished ranked No. 1 in the Coaches Poll for the first time in program history.

Michigan's statistical leaders included starting quarterback J. J. McCarthy with 2,991 passing yards and a 72.3% completion percentage and running back Blake Corum with 1,245 rushing yards and an FBS-leading and single-season school-record 27 rushing touchdowns. Guard Zak Zinter was selected as a unanimous All-American, with Corum and cornerbacks Mike Sainristil and Will Johnson receiving first-team All-American honors.

McCarthy was awarded the Big Ten Quarterback of the Year and Corum received the Big Ten Running Back of the Year for a second straight season. Both were also selected to the 2023 All-Big Ten Conference football team receiving first-team honors. In addition was Zinter, Sainristil, Johnson, center Drake Nugent, offensive tackle LaDarius Henderson, tight end Colston Loveland and defensive lineman Mason Graham. Michigan's defense held opponents to 10.4 points per game (PPG), the fewest by a Big Ten team since Michigan's 1997 national championship team (9.5 PPG) and fewest overall since the 2011 Alabama Crimson Tide (8.8 PPG).

Harbaugh was suspended by the university from game-day coaching for the first three games of the season due to alleged recruiting violations during the COVID-19 pandemic. He was also suspended by the Big Ten for the final three games of the regular season as punishment related to the University of Michigan football sign-stealing scandal. Sherrone Moore, the team's offensive coordinator, led Michigan to four victories, including wins over No. 10 Penn State and No. 2 Ohio State, as acting head coach during Harbaugh's absence.

To date, 25 players from the 2023 roster have been selected in subsequent NFL drafts, including a school-record 13 selections in 2024, the most from a single university that year.

== Schedule ==
| Date | Time | Opponent | Rank | Site | TV | Result | Attendance | Source |
|---|---|---|---|---|---|---|---|---|
| September 2 | 12:00 p.m. | East Carolina* | No. 2 | Michigan Stadium; Ann Arbor, MI | Peacock | W 30–3 | 109,480 | |
| September 9 | 3:30 p.m. | UNLV* | No. 2 | Michigan Stadium; Ann Arbor, MI | CBS | W 35–7 | 109,482 | |
| September 16 | 7:30 p.m. | Bowling Green* | No. 2 | Michigan Stadium; Ann Arbor, MI | BTN | W 31–6 | 109,955 | |
| September 23 | 12:00 p.m. | Rutgers^{†} | No. 2 | Michigan Stadium; Ann Arbor, MI | BTN | W 31–7 | 109,756 | |
| September 30 | 3:30 p.m. | at Nebraska | No. 2 | Memorial Stadium; Lincoln, NE | Fox | W 45–7 | 87,134 | |
| October 7 | 7:30 p.m. | at Minnesota | No. 2 | Huntington Bank Stadium; Minneapolis, MN (Little Brown Jug) | NBC | W 52–10 | 52,179 | |
| October 14 | 12:00 p.m. | Indiana | No. 2 | Michigan Stadium; Ann Arbor, MI | Fox | W 52–7 | 110,264 | |
| October 21 | 7:30 p.m. | at Michigan State | No. 2 | Spartan Stadium; East Lansing, MI (rivalry) | NBC | W 49–0 | 74,206 | |
| November 4 | 7:30 p.m. | Purdue | No. 3 | Michigan Stadium; Ann Arbor, MI | NBC | W 41–13 | 110,245 | |
| November 11 | 12:00 p.m. | at No. 10 Penn State | No. 3 | Beaver Stadium; State College, PA (rivalry, Big Noon Kickoff) | Fox | W 24–15 | 110,856 | |
| November 18 | 12:00 p.m. | at Maryland | No. 3 | SECU Stadium; College Park, MD (Big Noon Kickoff) | Fox | W 31–24 | 49,546 | |
| November 25 | 12:00 p.m. | No. 2 Ohio State | No. 3 | Michigan Stadium; Ann Arbor, MI (rivalry, Big Noon Kickoff, College GameDay) | Fox | W 30–24 | 110,615 | |
| December 2 | 8:00 p.m. | vs. No. 16 Iowa* | No. 2 | Lucas Oil Stadium; Indianapolis, IN (Big Ten Championship Game, Big Noon Kickoff) | Fox | W 26–0 | 67,842 | |
| January 1, 2024 | 5:00 p.m. | vs. No. 4 Alabama* | No. 1 | Rose Bowl; Pasadena, CA (Rose Bowl—CFP Semifinal, College GameDay) | ESPN | W 27–20 ^{OT} | 96,371 | |
| January 8, 2024 | 7:30 p.m. | vs. No. 2 Washington* | No. 1 | NRG Stadium; Houston, TX (CFP National Championship, College GameDay) | ESPN | W 34–13 | 72,808 | |
*Non-conference game; ^{†}Homecoming; Rankings from AP Poll (and CFP Rankings, after October 31); All times are in Eastern time

== Rankings ==
Ranking movements Legend: ██ Increase in ranking ██ Decrease in ranking ( ) = First-place votes
| | Week | | | | | | | | | | | | | | | |
| Poll | Pre | 1 | 2 | 3 | 4 | 5 | 6 | 7 | 8 | 9 | 10 | 11 | 12 | 13 | 14 | Final |
|---|---|---|---|---|---|---|---|---|---|---|---|---|---|---|---|---|
| AP | 2 (2) | 2 (2) | 2 (2) | 2 (2) | 2 (1) | 2 (12) | 2 (11) | 2 (16) | 2 (19) | 2 (9) | 2 (9) | 2 (7) | 3 | 2 (10) | 1 (51) | 1 (61) |
| Coaches | 2 | 2 (1) | 2 (1) | 2 (1) | 2 | 2 (1) | 2 | 2 (4) | 2 (4) | 2 (3) | 2 (4) | 2 (3) | 3 (1) | 2 (4) | 1 (51) | 1 (63) |
| CFP | Not released | | | | | | | | | 3 | 3 | 3 | 3 | 2 | 1 | Not released |

== Preseason ==
=== Coaching changes ===
- On January 17, 2023, sources reported that co-offensive coordinator and quarterbacks coach Matt Weiss was placed on leave pending an ongoing police investigation into a report of "computer access crimes" that occurred in December 2022. On January 20, 2023, Michigan announced that “[a]fter a review of University policies, the athletic department has terminated the appointment of co-offensive coordinator/quarterbacks coach Matt Weiss."
- On January 27, it was announced that Michigan promoted Kirk Campbell to the role of quarterbacks coach, replacing the departed Matt Weiss. Campbell spent 2022 at Michigan as an offensive analyst after serving as the offensive coordinator at Old Dominion for two seasons.
- On February 8, Michigan announced the return of former Michigan assistant Chris Partridge to the staff in an unspecified role. Partridge served in a variety of roles at Michigan from 2015 to 2019 and spent the last three seasons as the co-defensive coordinator and safeties coach at Ole Miss.
- On February 16, Michigan and linebackers coach George Helow mutually agreed to part ways.
- The next day on February 17, Michigan announced that the previously hired Chris Partridge would be the linebackers coach, replacing Helow. In the same announcement, Sherrone Moore became the sole offensive coordinator, having previously served as the co-offensive coordinator alongside Weiss.

=== Suspensions of Jim Harbaugh ===
On August 23, Michigan announced that it was self-imposing a three-game suspension on head coach Jim Harbaugh related to recruiting violations. Days later it was announced that Sherrone Moore, Jesse Minter, Jay Harbaugh and Mike Hart would all serve as interim head coach in Harbaugh's absence with Minter coaching the first game, Jay Harbaugh coaching the first half of the second game, Hart coaching the second half of the second game, and Moore coaching the third game. In addition, Jack Harbaugh was named assistant head coach and strength and conditioning coach Ben Herbert was promoted to associate head coach. On November 10, Harbaugh received another three-game suspension, this time related to the Michigan Wolverines football sign-stealing scandal. Moore was named as the interim head coach for the duration of Harbaugh's suspension. A planned court hearing to challenge the suspension was cancelled as Harbaugh agreed to accept it, with the Big Ten also closing its investigation the same day.

Game day head coaches for the 2023 season
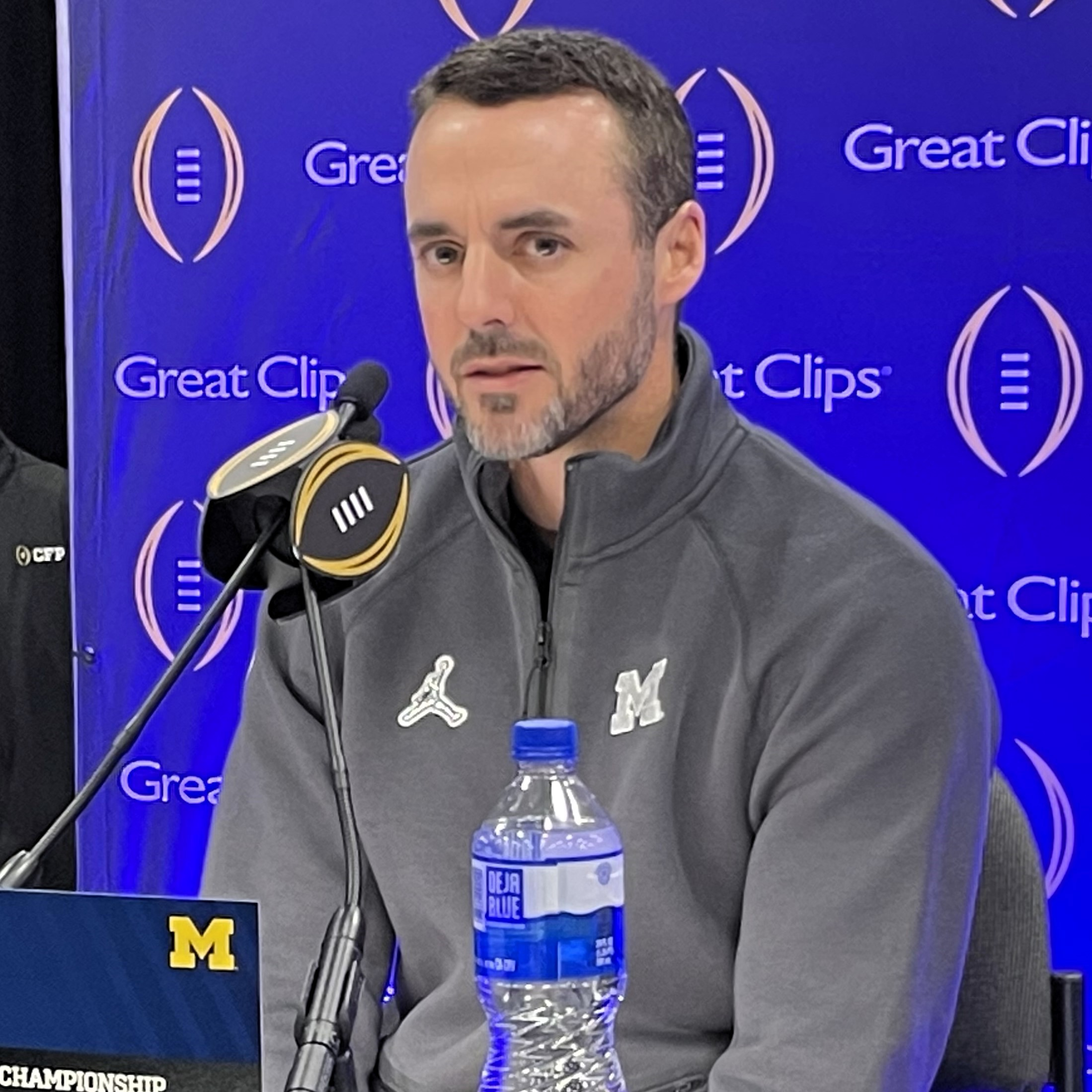
Jesse Minter (game 1)

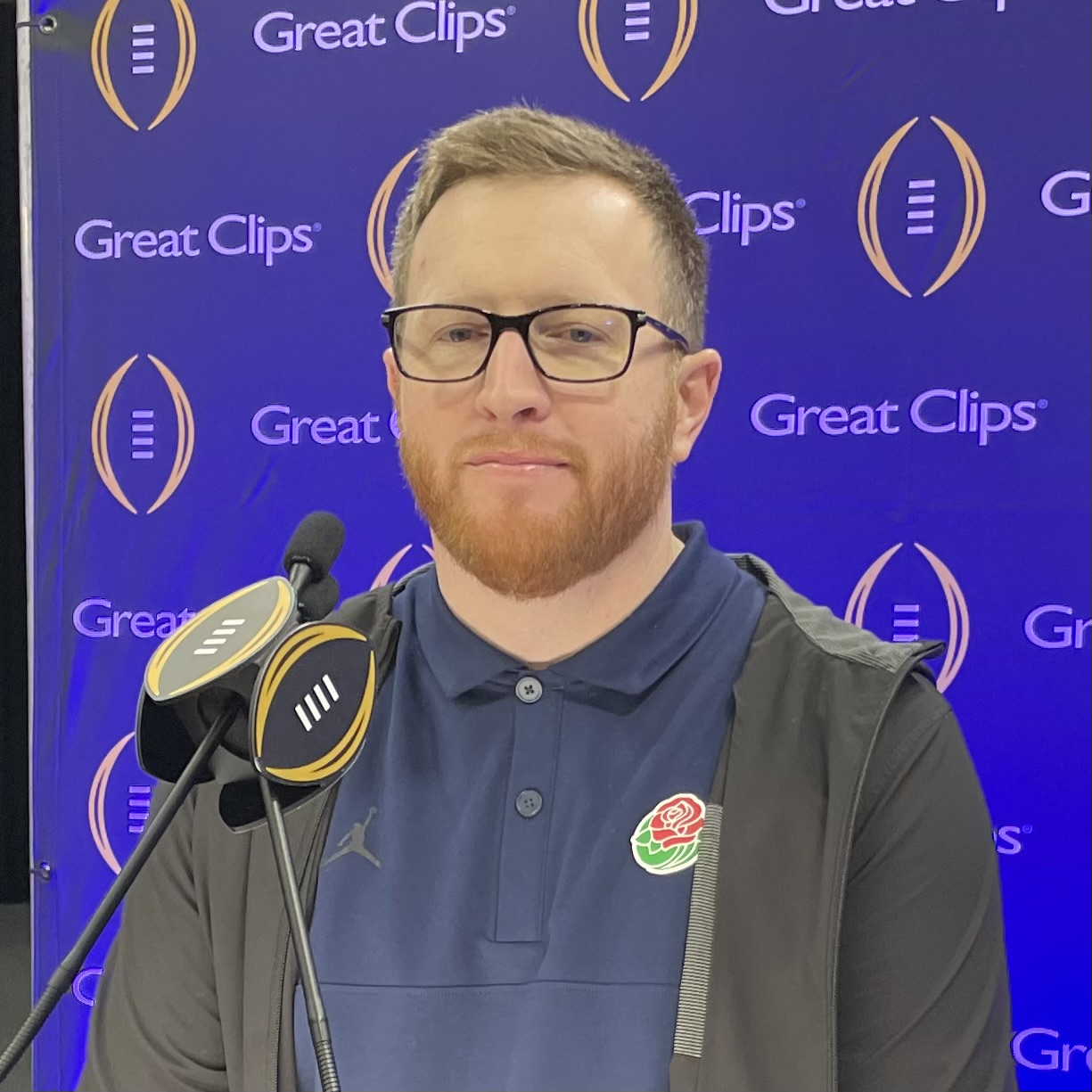
Jay Harbaugh (game 2, 1st half)

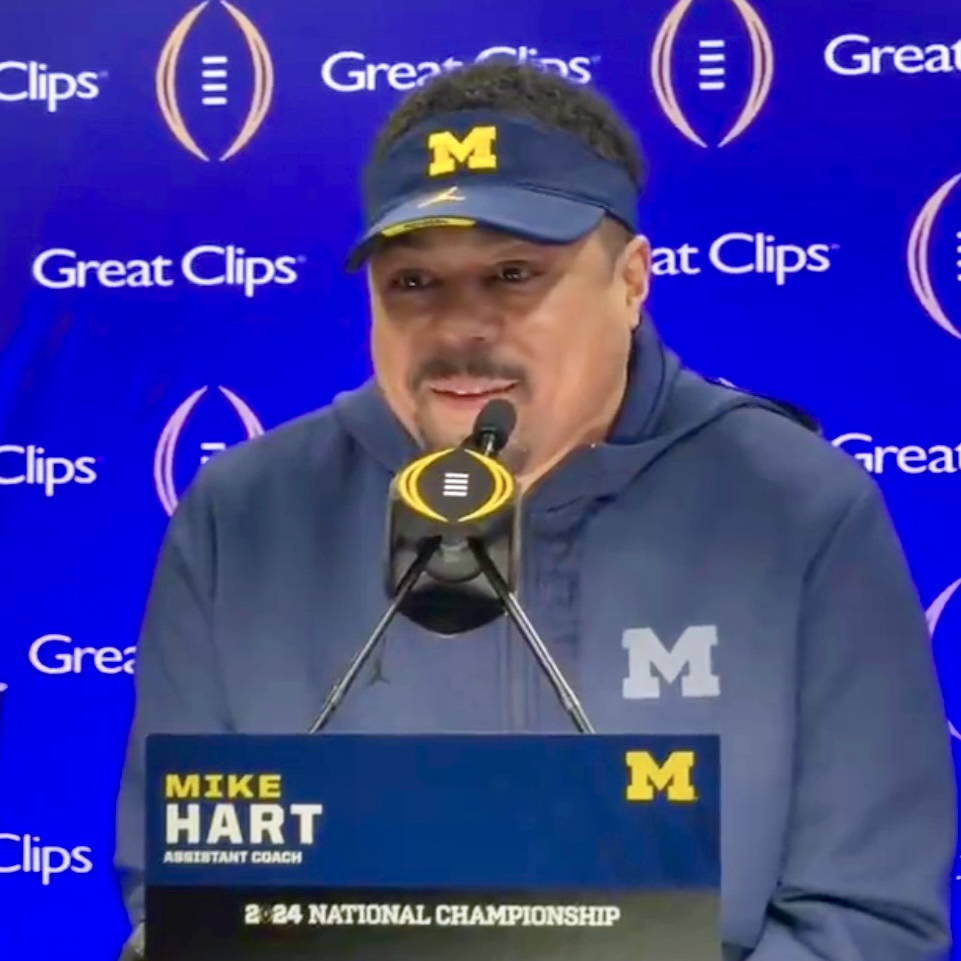
Mike Hart (game 2, 2nd half)

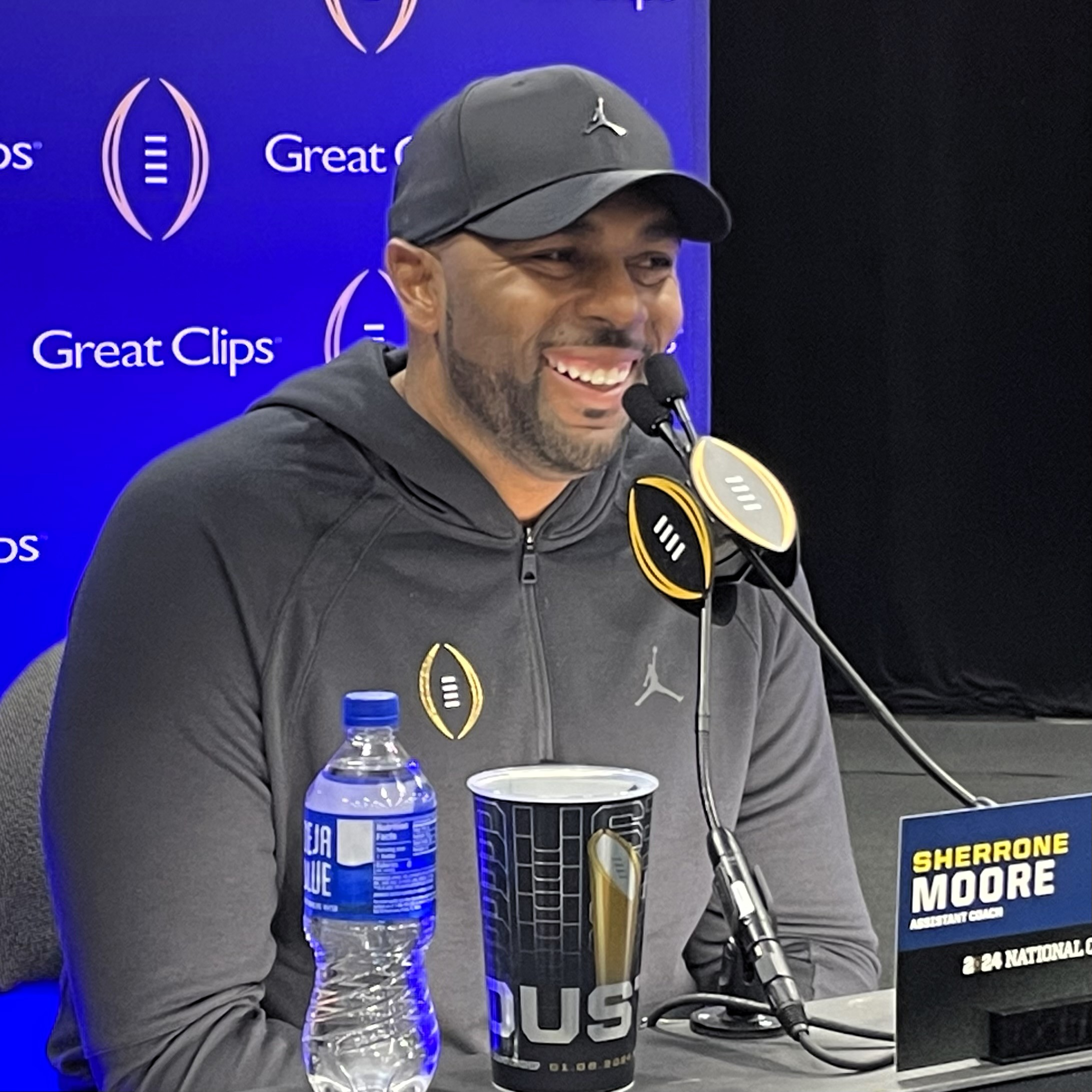
Sherrone Moore (games 3, 10–12)

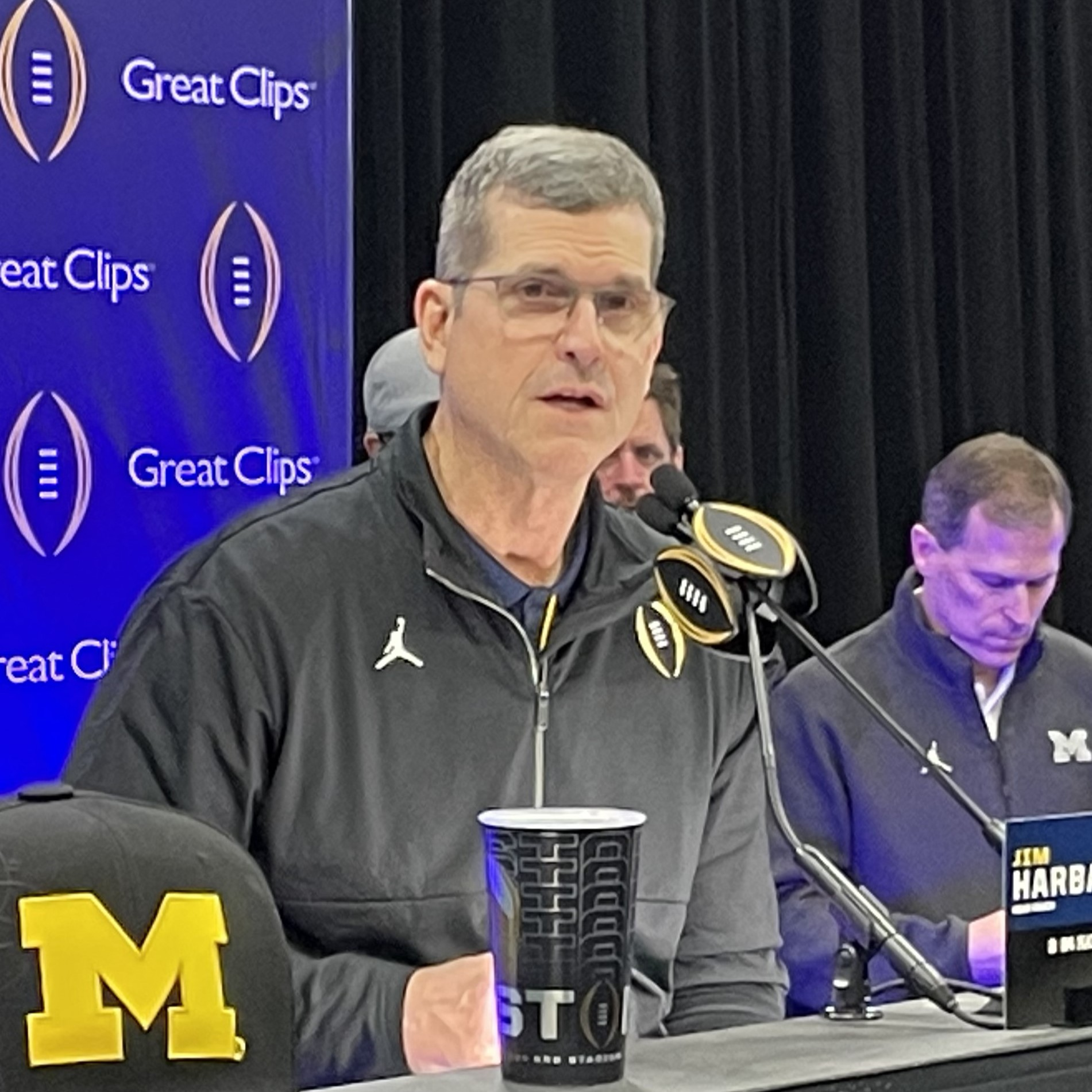
Jim Harbaugh (games 4–9, 13–15)
Listed chronologically from first game coached.

== Game summaries ==
=== East Carolina ===
East Carolina at No. 2 Michigan

| Team | 1 | 2 | 3 | 4 | Total |
|---|---|---|---|---|---|
| Pirates | 0 | 0 | 0 | 3 | 3 |
| • No. 2 Wolverines | 7 | 16 | 7 | 0 | 30 |

- Date: September 2
- Location: Michigan Stadium
  Ann Arbor, MI
- Game start: 12:07 p.m. EDT
- Elapsed time: 3:14
- Game attendance: 109,480
- Game weather: 79 °F (26 °C), sunny, SW 10 miles per hour (16 km/h)
- Referee: Greg Sujack
- TV announcers (Peacock): Mike Tirico, Chris Simms, and Lewis Johnson

Scoring summary
| 1 | 5:43 | MICH | Roman Wilson 13-yard pass from J. J. McCarthy (James Turner kick) | MICH 7–0 |
| 2 | 14:07 | MICH | Blake Corum 2-yard run (James Turner kick) | MICH 14–0 |
| 2 | 5:32 | MICH | Roman Wilson 10-yard pass from J. J. McCarthy (kick missed) | MICH 20–0 |
| 2 | 0:00 | MICH | James Turner 50-yard field goal | MICH 23–0 |
| 3 | 9:13 | MICH | Roman Wilson 15-yard pass from J. J. McCarthy (James Turner kick) | MICH 30–0 |
| 4 | 0:00 | ECU | Andrew Conrad 33-yard field goal | MICH 30–3 |

To open the season, Michigan played against East Carolina. Before a crowd of 109,480 at Michigan Stadium, the Wolverines defeated the Pirates, 30–3. It was the first meeting between the two programs. The game began with back-to-back three-and-outs as neither team had success on their initial possessions. On East Carolina's second possession, Michigan intercepted a Mason Garcia pass at the Michigan 46-yard line. The Wolverines then drove 57 yards, scoring on a 14-yard touchdown pass from J. J. McCarthy to Roman Wilson. On Michigan's next drive, the Wolverines drove 90 yards on seven plays, including a 37-yard run by Blake Corum followed by a two-yard touchdown run by Corum. On the Wolverines fourth possession, they drove 76 yards on seven plays and scored on a 10-yard touchdown pass from McCarthy to Wilson and James Turner missed the extra point. On their final possession of the half, Michigan drove 42 yards on 10 plays, with Turner kicking a 50-yard field goal on the final play of the half. Michigan led, 23–0, at halftime.

After the second-half kickoff, Michigan drove 75 yards on 12 plays, scoring on a 15-yard touchdown pass from McCarthy to Wilson – the third touchdown pass and catch of the game for the pair. On its next possession, Michigan drove 79 yards on 12 plays but were stopped short of the goal line. On the opening drive of the fourth quarter, Davis Warren took over at quarterback for Michigan; the Wolverines began the drive at the East Carolina 38-yard line, gained only four yards, and James Turner missed a 52-yard field goal attempt. Andrew Conrad kicked a 33-yard field goal for East Carolina as time ran out.

Defensive coordinator Jesse Minter served as acting head coach for the game and was credited with the victory, as Jim Harbaugh was serving a three-game suspension. Quarterback J. J. McCarthy recorded his best career passing game at home (280 yards, three touchdowns). McCarthy's 86.7% completion percentage (26-for-30) ranks second-highest in program history, behind Elvis Grbac's 90.9% (20-for-22) against Notre Dame on September 14, 1991.

| Statistics | ECU | UM |
|---|---|---|
| First downs | 12 | 26 |
| Plays–yards | 55–235 | 62–402 |
| Rushes–yards | 26–103 | 31–122 |
| Passing yards | 132 | 280 |
| Passing: comp–att–int | 17–29–1 | 26–31–0 |
| Turnovers | | |
| Time of possession | 26:34 | 33:26 |

| Team | Category | Player | Statistics |
|---|---|---|---|
| East Carolina | Passing | Mason Garcia | 11/18, 80 yards, 1 INT |
| East Carolina | Rushing | Mason Garcia | 8 carries, 36 yards |
| East Carolina | Receiving | Javious Bond | 3 receptions, 31 yards |
| Michigan | Passing | J. J. McCarthy | 26/30, 280 yards, 3 TD |
| Michigan | Rushing | Blake Corum | 11 carries, 77 yards, 1 TD |
| Michigan | Receiving | Roman Wilson | 6 receptions, 78 yards, 3 TD |

=== UNLV ===
UNLV at No. 2 Michigan

| Team | 1 | 2 | 3 | 4 | Total |
|---|---|---|---|---|---|
| Rebels | 0 | 0 | 0 | 7 | 7 |
| • No. 2 Wolverines | 7 | 14 | 14 | 0 | 35 |

- Date: September 9
- Location: Michigan Stadium
  Ann Arbor, MI
- Game start: 3:39 p.m. EDT
- Elapsed time: 3:04
- Game attendance: 109,482
- Game weather: Temperature: 69 °F (21 °C), Cloudy, N 7 miles per hour (11 km/h)
- Referee: Jeffrey Servinski
- TV announcers (CBS): Brad Nessler, Gary Danielson, and Jenny Dell

Scoring summary
| 1 | 7:06 | MICH | Blake Corum 3-yard run (James Turner kick) | MICH 7–0 |
| 2 | 14:56 | MICH | Blake Corum 2-yard run (James Turner kick) | MICH 14–0 |
| 2 | 0:24 | MICH | Roman Wilson 13-yard pass from J. J. McCarthy (James Turner kick) | MICH 21–0 |
| 3 | 10:31 | MICH | Roman Wilson 47-yard pass from J. J. McCarthy (James Turner kick) | MICH 28–0 |
| 3 | 3:16 | MICH | Blake Corum 5-yard run (James Turner kick) | MICH 35–0 |
| 4 | 2:43 | UNLV | Jordan Younge-Humphrey 20-yard run (Jose Pizano kick) | MICH 35–7 |

Following its opening game against East Carolina, Michigan hosted the UNLV Rebels, winning 35–7, before a crowd of 109,482 at Michigan Stadium. As a result of the university's three-game suspension of Jim Harbaugh, special teams coordinator Jay Harbaugh served as acting head coach in the first half, while running backs coach Mike Hart was the acting head coach in the second half. Hart became the first African American to serve in the role of head football coach at Michigan.

On the game's opening drive, UNLV drove 19 yards before punting. On the Wolverines' first possession, they drove 80 yards on nine plays, as J. J. McCarthy completed passes to Blake Corum for 20 yards, Tyler Morris for 16 yards, Roman Wilson for 25 yards, and Cornelius Johnson for six yards, and Corum scored on a three-yard run. Michigan's defense then held UNLV to a three-and-out. On their second possession, the Wolverines drove 75 yards on 11 plays, including McCarthy's passes to Tyler Morris for 15 yard and AJ Barner for 12 yards. McCarthy then ran 17 yards to UNLV's two-yard line, and Corum scored on a two-yard run on the first play of the second quarter.

UNLV was limited to five yards and a punt on its first drive of the second quarter. Michigan then drove 42 yards to UNLV's 18-yard line, but Corum's run on fourth-and-two failed to gain the necessary yardage. UNLV then drove 25 yards on seven plays but was forced to punt. On its second drive of the second quarter (fourth of the game), Michigan drove 83 yards on 19 plays, including passes to Cornelius Johnson for 18 yards, Donovan Edwards for 15 yards, and Roman Wilson for 13 yards and a touchdown. Michigan led, 21–0, at halftime.

On Michigan's second drive of the second half, McCarthy completed a touchdown pass to Roman Wilson covering 47 yards. As he completed the 47-yards pass to Wilson, McCarthy wore the number 47 on his hand in tribute to high-school teammate and former UNLV player Ryan Keeler who died of a heart arrhythmia in February 2023. UNLV responded with a seven-play, 42-yard drive to Michigan's 33-yard line, but the drive ended with a turnover on downs. The teams then exchange three-and-outs. Michigan then drove 76 yards on four plays, including a 19-yard run by Corum and a 26-yard pass completion from McCarthy to Johnson; Corum scored on a five-yard run, and Michigan led 35–0, at the end of the third quarter.

In the fourth quarter, Davis Warren took over at quarterback for Michigan. Warren threw an interception on his second pass, and UNLV took over at its own 23-yard line. UNLV drove 37 yards but was unable to convert on fourth-and-three at Michigan's 40-yard line. Jack Tuttle took over as Michigan's quarterback, but was knocked out of the game on a late hit out of bounds. Jayden Denegal took over at quarterback, and Michigan was held to a three-and-out. UNLV then drove 81 yards on nine plays, scoring on a 20-yard touchdown run by Jordan Younge-Humphrey.

Through two games, J. J. McCarthy has completed 48 of 55 pass attempts for an 87.2% completion percentage. Running back Blake Corum posted 15 carries for 80 yards and scored three rushing touchdowns, for his 11th career multi-touchdown game.

| Statistics | UNLV | UM |
|---|---|---|
| First downs | 15 | 23 |
| Plays–yards | 57–229 | 61–492 |
| Rushes–yards | 31–61 | 33–179 |
| Passing yards | 168 | 313 |
| Passing: comp–att–int | 15–26–0 | 23–28–1 |
| Turnovers | | |
| Time of possession | 28:54 | 31:06 |

| Team | Category | Player | Statistics |
|---|---|---|---|
| UNLV | Passing | Doug Brumfield | 10/19, 100 yards |
| UNLV | Rushing | Jordan Younge-Humphrey | 2 carries, 23 yards |
| UNLV | Receiving | Jacob De Jesus | 5 receptions, 46 yards |
| Michigan | Passing | J. J. McCarthy | 22/25, 278 yards, 2 TD |
| Michigan | Rushing | Blake Corum | 15 carries, 80 yards, 3 TD |
| Michigan | Receiving | Roman Wilson | 4 receptions, 89 yards, 2 TD |

=== Bowling Green ===
Bowling Green at No. 2 Michigan

| Team | 1 | 2 | 3 | 4 | Total |
|---|---|---|---|---|---|
| Falcons | 0 | 6 | 0 | 0 | 6 |
| • No. 2 Wolverines | 7 | 7 | 17 | 0 | 31 |

- Date: September 16
- Location: Michigan Stadium
  Ann Arbor, MI
- Game start: 7:45 p.m. EDT
- Elapsed time: 3:02
- Game attendance: 109,955
- Game weather: 67 °F (19 °C), sunny, SW 5 miles per hour (8.0 km/h)
- Referee: Larry Smith
- TV announcers (BTN): Cory Provus, Jake Butt, and Brooke Fletcher

Scoring summary
| 1 | 10:44 | MICH | Blake Corum 4-yard run (James Turner kick) | MICH 7–0 |
| 2 | 14:13 | BGSU | Alan Anaya 36-yard field goal | MICH 7–3 |
| 2 | 11:39 | BGSU | Alan Anaya 42-yard field goal | MICH 7–6 |
| 2 | 4:15 | MICH | Roman Wilson 33-yard pass from J. J. McCarthy (James Turner kick) | MICH 14–6 |
| 3 | 12:44 | MICH | Blake Corum 2-yard run (James Turner kick) | MICH 21–6 |
| 3 | 10:12 | MICH | James Turner 42-yard field goal | MICH 24–6 |
| 3 | 6:28 | MICH | Cornelius Johnson 50-yard pass from J. J. McCarthy (James Turner kick) | MICH 31–6 |

On September 16, Michigan defeated Bowling Green, 31–6, before a crowd of 109,955 at Michigan Stadium. It was the final game of Jim Harbaugh's three-game suspension with offensive coordinator Sherrone Moore serving as acting head coach. Bowling Green head coach Scot Loeffler played for Michigan in the 1990s and was an assistant coach at Michigan from 2002 to 2006.

After holding Bowling Green to a three-and-out, Blake Corum ran for a 54-yard gain on Michigan's first offensive play. Corum scored three plays later on a four-yard run, capping a 77-yard drive. Bowling Green was held to another three-and-out on its second possession. On Michigan's second possession, the Wolverines drove 38 yards to Bowling Green's five-yard line, but the Falcons intercepted a J. J. McCarthy pass in the end zone. It was McCarthy's first interception of the season. Michigan led, 7–0, at the end of the first quarter.

Following McCarthy's interception, Bowling Green drove 62 yards on 12 plays, ending early in the second quarter with a 36-yard field goal by Alan Anaya. Michigan tight end Max Bredeson fumbled a short kickoff, and Anaya kicked a second field goal (a 42-yarder) to cut Michigan's lead to 7–6. McCarthy threw his second interception on Michigan's next possession. The Wolverines got the ball back with 6:51 remaining in the half and drove 62 yards on five plays, culminating with a 33-yard touchdown pass from McCarthy to Roman Wilson. Despite giving up three turnovers, Michigan led, 14–6, at halftime.

In the third quarter, Michigan defensive tackle Kris Jenkins Jr. intercepted Hayden Timosciek's pass inside the Bowling Green 10-yard line, setting up Michigan's third touchdown on a two-yard run by Corum. Michigan forced another turnover on Bowling Green's next possession, as defensive end Jaylen Harrell stripped the ball from the hands of Bowling Green's Camden Orth, and Michael Barrett recovered the loose ball inside Bowling Green's 30-yard line. Michigan capitalized on the turnover with a 42-yard field goal by James Turner. On Michigan's next possession, the Wolverines executed a flea-flicker as McCarthy threw a 50-yard pass to Cornelius Johnson; the ball was tipped and juggled but Johnson held on for the touchdown. With less than a minute remaining in the third quarter, McCarthy threw his third interception of the game. Neither team scored in the fourth quarter.

Corum rushed for 101 yards and two touchdowns on 12 carries, his first 100-yard rushing game of the 2023 season. In his worst game of the season, McCarthy completed eight of 13 passes for 143 yards, two touchdowns, and three interceptions.

| Statistics | BGSU | UM |
|---|---|---|
| First downs | 10 | 15 |
| Plays–yards | 57–205 | 44–312 |
| Rushes–yards | 36–81 | 31–169 |
| Passing yards | 124 | 143 |
| Passing: comp–att–int | 14–21–2 | 8–13–3 |
| Turnovers | | |
| Time of possession | 36:24 | 23:36 |

| Team | Category | Player | Statistics |
|---|---|---|---|
| Bowling Green | Passing | Camden Orth | 8/11, 91 yards |
| Bowling Green | Rushing | Nick Mosley | 4 carries, 33 yards |
| Bowling Green | Receiving | Odieu Hiliare | 2 receptions, 37 yards |
| Michigan | Passing | J. J. McCarthy | 8/13, 143 yards, 2 TD, 3 INT |
| Michigan | Rushing | Blake Corum | 12 carries, 101 yards, 2 TD |
| Michigan | Receiving | Cornelius Johnson | 3 receptions, 71 yards, 1 TD |

=== Rutgers ===
Rutgers at No. 2 Michigan

| Team | 1 | 2 | 3 | 4 | Total |
|---|---|---|---|---|---|
| Scarlet Knights | 7 | 0 | 0 | 0 | 7 |
| • No. 2 Wolverines | 7 | 7 | 10 | 7 | 31 |

- Date: September 23
- Location: Michigan Stadium
  Ann Arbor, MI
- Game start: 12:01 p.m. EDT
- Elapsed time: 2:50
- Game attendance: 109,756
- Game weather: 67 °F (19 °C), cloudy, E 7 miles per hour (11 km/h)
- Referee: Mark Kluczynski
- TV announcers (BTN): Cory Provus, Jake Butt, and Brooke Fletcher

Scoring summary
| 1 | 14:00 | RUT | Christian Dremel 69-yard pass from Gavin Wimsatt (Jai Patel kick) | RUT 7–0 |
| 1 | 5:56 | MICH | Blake Corum 2-yard run (James Turner kick) | Tied 7–7 |
| 2 | 1:41 | MICH | Semaj Morgan 18-yard pass from J. J. McCarthy (James Turner kick) | MICH 14–7 |
| 3 | 7:00 | MICH | James Turner 46-yard field goal | MICH 17–7 |
| 3 | 4:31 | MICH | Mike Sainristil 71-yard interception return (James Turner kick) | MICH 24–7 |
| 4 | 12:38 | MICH | Blake Corum 5-yard run (James Turner kick) | MICH 31–7 |

In the season's first conference game, Michigan defeated Rutgers, 31–7, before a crowd of 109,756 at Michigan Stadium. Rutgers opened the scoring in the first quarter via a 69-yard touchdown pass from Gavin Wimsatt to Christian Dremel. It was the first time Michigan had trailed during the 2023 season. Michigan responded with 31 unanswered points, including a two-yard touchdown run by Blake Corum in the first quarter to tie the game. Michigan scored seven points in the second quarter on an 18-yard touchdown pass from J. J. McCarthy to Semaj Morgan. Michigan led, 14–7, at halftime. Michigan scored 10 points in the third quarter on a 46-yard field goal by James Turner and a 71-yard interception return by Mike Sainristil. Michigan extended its lead in the fourth quarter on a five-yard touchdown run by Corum.

Head coach Jim Harbaugh returned to coaching the team following his suspension and earned his 75th career victory at Michigan, becoming the fourth coach in program history to reach the milestone. Quarterback J. J. McCarthy completed 15 of 21 passes for 214 yards and a touchdown. Michigan's defense forced three turnovers on fourth down against Rutgers. Through the Rutgers game, opponents were a combined 0–7 on fourth down against Michigan.

| Statistics | RU | UM |
|---|---|---|
| First downs | 10 | 20 |
| Plays–yards | 44–257 | 61–415 |
| Rushes–yards | 23–77 | 40–201 |
| Passing yards | 180 | 214 |
| Passing: comp–att–int | 11–21 | 15–21 |
| Turnovers | | |
| Time of possession | 23:52 | 36:08 |

| Team | Category | Player | Statistics |
|---|---|---|---|
| Rutgers | Passing | Gavin Wimsatt | 11/21, 180 yards, 1 TD, 1 INT |
| Rutgers | Rushing | Gavin Wimsatt | 6 carries, 28 yards |
| Rutgers | Receiving | Christian Dremel | 3 receptions, 85 yards, 1 TD |
| Michigan | Passing | J. J. McCarthy | 15/21, 214 yards, 1 TD |
| Michigan | Rushing | Blake Corum | 21 carries, 97 yards, 2 TD |
| Michigan | Receiving | Colston Loveland | 5 receptions, 75 yards |

=== At Nebraska ===
No. 2 Michigan at Nebraska

| Team | 1 | 2 | 3 | 4 | Total |
|---|---|---|---|---|---|
| • No. 2 Wolverines | 14 | 14 | 7 | 10 | 45 |
| Cornhuskers | 0 | 0 | 0 | 7 | 7 |

- Date: September 30
- Location: Memorial Stadium
  Lincoln, NE
- Game start: 2:41 p.m. CDT
- Elapsed time: 2:58
- Game attendance: 87,134
- Game weather: 93 °F (34 °C), sunny, SW 22 miles per hour (35 km/h)
- Referee: Greg Blum
- TV announcers (Fox): Jason Benetti, Brock Huard, and Allison Williams

Scoring summary
| 1 | 9:20 | MICH | Roman Wilson 29-yard pass from J. J. McCarthy (James Turner kick) | MICH 7–0 |
| 1 | 7:15 | MICH | Kalel Mullings 20-yard run (James Turner kick) | MICH 14–0 |
| 2 | 11:22 | MICH | J. J. McCarthy 21-yard run (James Turner kick) | MICH 21–0 |
| 2 | 0:23 | MICH | Roman Wilson 16-yard pass from J. J. McCarthy (kick missed) | MICH 28–0 |
| 3 | 5:58 | MICH | Blake Corum 1-yard run (James Turner kick) | MICH 35–0 |
| 4 | 14:47 | MICH | James Turner 30-yard field goal | MICH 38–0 |
| 4 | 4:37 | MICH | Peyton O'Leary 8-yard pass from Jayden Denegal (James Turner kick) | MICH 45–0 |
| 4 | 4:17 | NEB | Joshua Fleeks 74-yard run (Tristan Alvano kick) | MICH 45–7 |

On September 30, Michigan defeated Nebraska, 45–7, in its conference opener at Lincoln, Nebraska.

Following the opening kickoff, Michigan drove 75 yards on 11 plays, ending with a 29-yard touchdown pass from J. J. McCarthy to Roman Wilson. Wilson made the catch in the end zone by pinning the ball against the helmet of a Nebraska defender. On Nebraska's second offensive play, Braiden McGregor tipped a pass, and Kenneth Grant intercepted the ball at Nebraska's 29-yard line. Michigan then scored on a 20-yard touchdown run by Kalel Mullings.

On Michigan's first possession of the second quarter, the Wolverines drove 88 yards on nine plays, including passes of 16 and 10 yards to AJ Barner and ending with a 21-yard touchdown run by McCarthy. Later in the quarter, the Wolverines drove 55 yards ending with a 16-yard touchdown pass from McCarthy to Wilson. Michigan led, 28–0, at halftime.

Nebraska began the third quarter driving to Michigan's 16-yard line, but a quarterback sack pushed the ball backwards and Tristan Alvano missed a 40-yard field goal attempt. Michigan then drove 78 yards on 11 plays, including a 19-yard pass from McCarthy to Darrius Clemons and ending with a one-yard touchdown run by Blake Corum. After forcing a three-and-out, the Wolverines drove 63 yards on 13 plays with Jack Tuttle at quarterback and scored on a 30-yard field goal by James Turner at the start of the fourth quarter. On Michigan's next possession, Jayden Denegal took over at quarterback and led the Wolverines on a 50-yard, 10-play drive, ending with an eight-yard touchdown pass from Denegal to Peyton O'Leary. Nebraska scored on a 74-yard touchdown run by Joshua Fleeks with 4:17 remaining in the game.

McCarthy finished the game completing 12 of 16 passes for 156 yards and two touchdowns and also scored on a 21-yard run. Roman Wilson tallied two touchdown receptions.

| Statistics | UM | NU |
|---|---|---|
| First downs | 26 | 10 |
| Plays–yards | 74–436 | 46–305 |
| Rushes–yards | 51–249 | 21–106 |
| Passing yards | 187 | 199 |
| Passing: comp–att–int | 16–23–0 | 14–25–1 |
| Turnovers | | |
| Time of possession | 38:01 | 21:59 |

| Team | Category | Player | Statistics |
|---|---|---|---|
| Michigan | Passing | J. J. McCarthy | 12/16, 156 yards, 2 TD |
| Michigan | Rushing | Blake Corum | 16 carries, 74 yards, 1 TD |
| Michigan | Receiving | Roman Wilson | 4 receptions, 58 yards, 2 TD |
| Nebraska | Passing | Heinrich Haarberg | 14/25, 199 yards, 1 INT |
| Nebraska | Rushing | Joshua Fleeks | 1 carries, 74 yards, 1 TD |
| Nebraska | Receiving | Billy Kemp | 4 receptions, 61 yards |

=== At Minnesota ===
No. 2 Michigan at Minnesota
(Little Brown Jug)

| Team | 1 | 2 | 3 | 4 | Total |
|---|---|---|---|---|---|
| • No. 2 Wolverines | 10 | 14 | 21 | 7 | 52 |
| Golden Gophers | 3 | 7 | 0 | 0 | 10 |

- Date: October 7
- Location: Huntington Bank Stadium
  Minneapolis, MN
- Game start: 6:35 p.m. CDT
- Elapsed time: 3:11
- Game attendance: 52,179
- Game weather: 49 °F (9 °C), cloudy, E 4 miles per hour (6.4 km/h)
- Referee: Jerry McGinn
- TV announcers (NBC): Noah Eagle, Todd Blackledge, and Kathryn Tappen

Scoring summary
| 1 | 14:14 | MICH | Will Johnson 35-yard interception return (James Turner kick) | MICH 7–0 |
| 1 | 7:33 | MICH | James Turner 31-yard field goal | MICH 10–0 |
| 1 | 2:35 | MINN | Dragan Kesich 54-yard field goal | MICH 10–3 |
| 2 | 10:08 | MICH | Blake Corum 1-yard run (James Turner kick) | MICH 17–3 |
| 2 | 5:50 | MICH | J. J. McCarthy 5-yard run (James Turner kick) | MICH 24–3 |
| 2 | 0:06 | MINN | Daniel Jackson 35-yard pass from Athan Kaliakmanis (Dragan Kesich kick) | MICH 24–10 |
| 3 | 8:28 | MICH | J. J. McCarthy 7-yard run (James Turner kick) | MICH 31–10 |
| 3 | 3:20 | MICH | Colston Loveland 24-yard pass from J. J. McCarthy (James Turner kick) | MICH 38–10 |
| 3 | 1:43 | MICH | Keon Sabb 29-yard interception return (James Turner kick) | MICH 45–10 |
| 4 | 9:21 | MICH | Leon Franklin 2-yard run (James Turner kick) | MICH 52–10 |

On October 7, Michigan defeated Minnesota, 52–10, in the Little Brown Jug game in Minneapolis.

On the second play from scrimmage, Michigan cornerback Will Johnson intercepted an Athan Kaliakmanis pass and returned it 36 yards for a touchdown with only 12 seconds having been played. The Wolverines then held the Golden Gophers to a three-and-out. On their first offensive possession, Michigan drove 59 yards on 10 plays, ending with a 31-yard field goal by James Turner. Minnesota responded with 40-yard drive and a 54-yard field goal by Dragan Kesich. The teams exchanged punts on the next two possessions. On their first drive of the second quarter, the Wolverines drove 62 yards on six plays, starting with a 40-yard run by Blake Corum and ending with a one-yard touchdown run by Corum. After holding Minnesota to a three-and-out, Michigan drove 67 yards on four plays, including a 49-yard pass from J. J. McCarthy to Cornelius Johnson and a five-yard touchdown run by McCarthy. In the closing minutes of the first half, Minnesota drove 75 yards on 11 plays, ending with a 35-yard touchdown pass from Kaliakmanis to Daniel Jackson with six seconds remaining in the half. Michigan led, 24–10, at halftime.

The second half opened with successive three-and-outs by Michigan and Minnesota. On their second possession of the half, the Wolverines drove 78 yards on nine plays, including receptions by Roman Wilson of 17 and 34 yards and a seven-yard touchdown run by McCarthy. After holding Minnesota to a three-and-out, Michigan drove 49 yards on six plays, ending with a 24-yard touchdown pass from McCarthy to Colston Loveland. On Minnesota's next possession, Keon Sabb intercepted a Kaliakmanis pass and returned it 28 yards for a touchdown with 3:20 remaining in the third quarter. In the fourth quarter, Michigan forced three punts by Minnesota and extended their lead with a 70-yard drive led by Jack Tuttle and ending with a two-yard touchdown run by Leon Franklin.

In his post-game interview, Minnesota head coach P. J. Fleck called Michigan "the best football team I've seen in eleven years of being a head coach. I've never seen a football team like that . . . They're one of the deepest teams, one of the best teams, biggest teams, fastest teams, strongest teams, and they do not make mistakes. They are truly like a boa constrictor and they do not beat themselves."

Michigan out-gained Minnesota by 432 to 169 in total yards. McCarthy completed 14 of 20 passes for 219 yards and a touchdown and also rushed for 17 yards and two touchdowns. Corum rushed for 69 yards and a touchdown on nine carries.

Michigan scored on two pick-six touchdowns for the first time since 2017 against Cincinnati. Michigan also scored at least 30 points for its ninth consecutive game, setting a new program record, surpassing the previous record of eight consecutive games in 1976.

| Statistics | UM | UM |
|---|---|---|
| First downs | 18 | 10 |
| Plays–yards | 56–432 | 55–169 |
| Rushes–yards | 33–191 | 39–117 |
| Passing yards | 241 | 52 |
| Passing: comp–att–int | 16–23–0 | 5–16–2 |
| Turnovers | | |
| Time of possession | 28:48 | 31:12 |

| Team | Category | Player | Statistics |
|---|---|---|---|
| Michigan | Passing | J. J. McCarthy | 14/20, 219 yards, 1 TD |
| Michigan | Rushing | Blake Corum | 9 carries, 69 yards, 1 TD |
| Michigan | Receiving | Cornelius Johnson | 3 receptions, 86 yards |
| Minnesota | Passing | Athan Kaliakmanis | 5/15, 52 yards, 1 TD, 1 INT |
| Minnesota | Rushing | Zach Evans | 12 carries, 45 yards |
| Minnesota | Receiving | Daniel Jackson | 2 receptions, 34 yards, 1 TD |

=== Indiana ===
Indiana at No. 2 Michigan

| Team | 1 | 2 | 3 | 4 | Total |
|---|---|---|---|---|---|
| Hoosiers | 7 | 0 | 0 | 0 | 7 |
| • No. 2 Wolverines | 0 | 21 | 17 | 14 | 52 |

- Date: October 14
- Location: Michigan Stadium
  Ann Arbor, MI
- Game start: 3:24 EDT
- Elapsed time: 3:13
- Game attendance: 110,264
- Game weather: 49 °F (9 °C), rain, NE 12 miles per hour (19 km/h)
- Referee: Tom ODey
- TV announcers (Fox): Gus Johnson, Joel Klatt, and Jenny Taft

Scoring summary
| 1 | 2:17 | IND | Jaylin Lucas 44-yard pass from Donaven McCulley (Chris Freeman kick) | IND 7–0 |
| 2 | 11:19 | MICH | Blake Corum 1-yard run (James Turner kick) | Tied 7–7 |
| 2 | 3:24 | MICH | Roman Wilson 2-yard pass from J. J. McCarthy (James Turner kick) | MICH 14–7 |
| 2 | 0:11 | MICH | Blake Corum 1-yard run (James Turner kick) | MICH 21–7 |
| 3 | 12:22 | MICH | Colston Loveland 54-yard pass from J. J. McCarthy (James Turner kick) | MICH 28–7 |
| 3 | 8:28 | MICH | Semaj Morgan 7-yard pass from J. J. McCarthy (James Turner kick) | MICH 35–7 |
| 3 | 5:18 | MICH | James Turner 28-yard field goal | MICH 38–7 |
| 4 | 12:02 | MICH | Donovan Edwards 2-yard run (James Turner kick) | MICH 45–7 |
| 4 | 6:03 | MICH | Karmello English 4-yard pass from Jack Tuttle (James Turner kick) | MICH 52–7 |

On October 14, Michigan defeated Indiana, 52–7, before a crowd of 110,264 at Michigan Stadium in Ann Arbor, Michigan. The game was played in the rain and at 49 °F (9 °C).

The teams opened the game with consecutive three-and-outs. On Indiana's second possession, the Hoosiers drove 60 yards to the Michigan 10-yard line, but the Wolverines pushed the Hoosiers back to the 16-yard line, and Michigan's Rod Moore intercepted a Tayven Jackson pass (tipped by Mike Sainristil) at the three-yard line and returned the ball to the 40-yard line. Michigan was again held to a three-and-out and, following the punt, Indiana drove 77 yards and scored on a trick play with quarterback Brendan Sorsby throwing a backward pass to wide receiver Donovan McCulley (a converted quarterback) who then threw a 44-yard touchdown pass to a wide-open Jaylin Lucas. Indiana led, 7–0, at the end of the first quarter. Michigan allowed three sacks and was outgained, 141 yards to 17 yards, in the first quarter.

Michigan then scored 52 unanswered points on their next eight possessions. On the opening possession of the second quarter, Michigan drove 77 yards on 11 plays, culminating with a one-yard touchdown run by Blake Corum. On their next possession, the Wolverines drove 87 yards on 11 plays, including pass completions from J. J. McCarthy to Tyler Morris for 14 and 23 yards and AJ Barner for 18 yards, and ending with a two-yard touchdown pass from McCarthy to Roman Wilson. In the final 1:40 of the first half, Michigan drove 46 yards on six plays, scoring on a one-yard touchdown run by Corum with 11 seconds remaining in the half. Michigan led, 21–7, at halftime.

On the opening kickoff of the second half, Semaj Morgan returned the ball to the 35-yard line. The Wolverines scored as McCarthy rolled out to the right and connected with Colston Loveland for a 54-yard touchdown pass. Michigan's defense held Indiana to three-and-out and negative 13 yards on a sack by Jaylen Harrell at the Indiana 11-yard line. Michigan then drove 52 yards on five plays, including a 22-yard run by McCarthy and a seven-yard touchdown pass from McCarthy to Semaj Morgan. On Indiana's ensuing possession, Michael Barrett sacked Tayven Jackson, forced a fumble, and recovered the ball at Indiana's 15-yard line. James Turner kicked a 28-yard field goal, and Michigan led, 38–7, at the end of the third quarter.

After a fumble by Indiana quarterback Sorsby, Mason Graham recovered the loose ball in the final minute of third quarter. Jack Tuttle took over at quarterback for Michigan and led the team on a 51-yard drive ending with a two-yard touchdown run by Donovan Edwards. After the touchdown, Keon Sabb intercepted an Indiana pass and returned it 28 yards to the Indiana 36-yard line. The Wolverines scored their final points on a four-yard touchdown pass from Tuttle to Karmello English.

McCarthy led the team on offense, completing 14 of 17 passes for 222 yards and three touchdowns. With 13 carries for 52 yards and two touchdowns, Corum became the tenth player in Michigan history to reach 3,000 career rushing yards and passed Mike Hart and Denard Robinson for third-most career rushing touchdowns (43) in program history. On defense, the Wolverines tallied four turnovers on two fumble recoveries and two interceptions.

The win was Michigan's 19th consecutive Big Ten victory, tying the program record set from 1990 to 1992. Michigan became the third team since 2000 to start the season 7–0 while winning every game by 24-plus points, following Ohio State in 2019 and Stanford in 2011.

| Statistics | IU | UM |
|---|---|---|
| First downs | 15 | 20 |
| Plays–yards | 62–232 | 64–407 |
| Rushes–yards | 33–92 | 42–163 |
| Passing yards | 140 | 244 |
| Passing: comp–att–int | 14–29–2 | 19–22–0 |
| Turnovers | | |
| Time of possession | 27:13 | 32:47 |

| Team | Category | Player | Statistics |
|---|---|---|---|
| Indiana | Passing | Tayven Jackson | 7/13, 52 yards, 2 INT |
| Indiana | Rushing | Trent Howland | 5 carries, 35 yards |
| Indiana | Receiving | Jaylin Lucas | 5 receptions, 56 yards, 1 TD |
| Michigan | Passing | J. J. McCarthy | 14/17, 222 yards, 3 TD |
| Michigan | Rushing | Benjamin Hall | 9 carries, 58 yards |
| Michigan | Receiving | Colston Loveland | 3 receptions, 80 yards, 1 TD |

=== At Michigan State ===
No. 2 Michigan at Michigan State
(Paul Bunyan Trophy)

| Team | 1 | 2 | 3 | 4 | Total |
|---|---|---|---|---|---|
| • No. 2 Wolverines | 14 | 14 | 14 | 7 | 49 |
| Spartans | 0 | 0 | 0 | 0 | 0 |

- Date: October 21
- Location: Spartan Stadium
  East Lansing, MI
- Game start: 7:33 EDT
- Elapsed time: 3:12
- Game attendance: 74,206
- Game weather: 46 °F (8 °C), cloudy, NW 3 miles per hour (4.8 km/h)
- Referee: Ron Snodgrass
- TV announcers (NBC): Noah Eagle, Todd Blackledge, and Kathryn Tappen

Scoring summary
| 1 | 8:50 | MICH | Blake Corum 1-yard run (James Turner kick) | MICH 7–0 |
| 1 | 1:55 | MICH | Roman Wilson 25-yard pass from J. J. McCarthy (James Turner kick) | MICH 14–0 |
| 2 | 10:44 | MICH | Colston Loveland 22-yard pass from J. J. McCarthy (James Turner kick) | MICH 21–0 |
| 2 | 2:54 | MICH | Colston Loveland 22-yard pass from J. J. McCarthy (James Turner kick) | MICH 28–0 |
| 3 | 9:49 | MICH | Mike Sainristil 72-yard interception return (James Turner kick) | MICH 35–0 |
| 3 | 6:44 | MICH | AJ Barner 11-yard pass from J. J. McCarthy (James Turner kick) | MICH 42–0 |
| 4 | 0:08 | MICH | Alex Orji 6-yard run (James Turner kick) | MICH 49–0 |

On October 21, Michigan faced their in-state rivals, the Michigan State Spartans, in the annual battle for the Paul Bunyan Trophy, at East Lansing, Michigan. In the previous season, Michigan defeated Michigan State, 29–7.

Michigan shutout Michigan State in a blowout 49–0 to retain the Paul Bunyan Trophy. Michigan scored 14 points in the first quarter via a one-yard touchdown run by Blake Corum and a 25-yard touchdown pass from J. J. McCarthy to Roman Wilson. Michigan scored 14 points in the second quarter via two 22-yard touchdown passes from McCarthy to Colston Loveland. Michigan led, 28–0, at halftime. Michigan scored 14 points in the third quarter via a 72-yard interception return by Mike Sainristil and an 11-yard touchdown pass from McCarthy to AJ Barner. Michigan scored seven points in the fourth quarter via a six-yard touchdown run by Alex Orji. Michigan's defense held Michigan State to 6-of-16 on third down, and 10 rushing yards in the first half. This was Michigan's first shutout victory against Michigan State since 2000, their largest margin of victory since a 55–0 victory in 1947, and their largest margin of victory in East Lansing.

The win was Michigan's 20th consecutive Big Ten victory, setting a new program record. With a margin of victory of 49 points, Michigan tied the 1974 Ohio State Buckeyes football team for the most consecutive Big Ten wins by 38-plus points (four). Michigan has scored 30-plus in 11 consecutive games, the longest streak in program history.

| Statistics | UM | MSU |
|---|---|---|
| First downs | 28 | 10 |
| Plays–yards | 69–477 | 58–190 |
| Rushes–yards | 34–120 | 28–57 |
| Passing yards | 357 | 133 |
| Passing: comp–att–int | 28–35–0 | 16–29–2 |
| Turnovers | | |
| Time of possession | 32:52 | 20:18 |

| Team | Category | Player | Statistics |
|---|---|---|---|
| Michigan | Passing | J. J. McCarthy | 21/27, 287 yards, 4 TD |
| Michigan | Rushing | Blake Corum | 15 carries, 59 yards, 1 TD |
| Michigan | Receiving | AJ Barner | 8 receptions, 99 yards, 1 TD |
| Michigan State | Passing | Katin Houser | 12/22, 101 yards, 1 INT |
| Michigan State | Rushing | Nate Carter | 17 carries, 36 yards |
| Michigan State | Receiving | Maliq Carr | 2 receptions, 32 yards |

=== Purdue ===
Purdue at Michigan

| Team | 1 | 2 | 3 | 4 | Total |
|---|---|---|---|---|---|
| Boilermakers | 0 | 6 | 0 | 7 | 13 |
| • No. 3 Wolverines | 17 | 3 | 7 | 14 | 41 |

- Date: November 4
- Location: Michigan Stadium
  Ann Arbor, MI
- Game start: 7:33 p.m. EDT
- Elapsed time: 3:19
- Game attendance: 110,245
- Game weather: 50 °F (10 °C), cloudy, NE 2 miles per hour (3.2 km/h)
- Referee: Chris Coyte
- TV announcers (NBC): Noah Eagle, Todd Blackledge, and Kathryn Tappen

Scoring summary
| 1 | 10:30 | MICH | Blake Corum 2-yard run (James Turner kick) | MICH 7–0 |
| 1 | 6:05 | MICH | Blake Corum 3-yard run (James Turner kick) | MICH 14–0 |
| 1 | 4:20 | MICH | James Turner 30-yard field goal | MICH 17–0 |
| 2 | 7:10 | MICH | James Turner 31-yard field goal | MICH 20–0 |
| 2 | 3:52 | PUR | Ben Freehill 32-yard field goal | MICH 20–3 |
| 2 | 0:29 | PUR | Ben Freehill 31-yard field goal | MICH 20–6 |
| 3 | 3:12 | MICH | Semaj Morgan 44-yard run (James Turner kick) | MICH 27–6 |
| 4 | 14:18 | MICH | Blake Corum 3-yard run (James Turner kick) | MICH 34–6 |
| 4 | 4:30 | MICH | Donovan Edwards 1-yard run (James Turner kick) | MICH 41–6 |
| 4 | 0:18 | PUR | Deion Burks 24-yard pass from Hudson Card (Ben Freehill kick) | MICH 41–13 |

On November 4, following its bye week, Michigan defeated the Purdue Boilermakers, 41–13, in a night game before a crowd of 110,245 at Michigan Stadium.

On their opening possession, the Wolverines drove 76 yards on six plays, including J. J. McCarthy passes to Roman Wilson for 20 yards and Donovan Edwards for 37 yards, and ending with a two-yard touchdown run by Blake Corum. On their second possession, the Wolverines drove 62 yards on seven plays, ending with a three-yard touchdown run by Corum. After Will Johnson intercepted a Hudson Card pass, Michigan took over at the Purdue 12-yard line, and James Turner kicked a 30-yard field goal to give Michigan a 17–0 lead at the end of the first quarter.

In the second quarter, Michigan extended its lead to 20–0 on a 31-yard field goal by Turner. Purdue kicked two field goals in the last four minutes of the half to narrow the lead to 20–6.

The third quarter began with four drives ending in punts. Late in the quarter, Michigan drove 62 yards on four plays, culminating with a 44-yard touchdown run by Semaj Morgan. Early in the fourth quarter, Michigan scored on a three-yard touchdown run by Corum – his third touchdown of the game. Later in the fourth quarter, Michigan drove 57 yards on six plays, including a 35-yard pass from McCarthy to Wilson and a one-yard touchdown run by Edwards. With 18 seconds remaining in the game, Purdue scored on a 24-yard touchdown pass from Card to Deion Burks.

Michigan extended its program record of scoring 40-plus points to five consecutive Big Ten games. With 335 passing yards, McCarthy passed Tom Brady for ninth place in career passing yardage for Michigan. With three rushing touchdowns in the game, Corum tied Tyrone Wheatley for second place on Michigan's career rushing touchdowns list with 47.

| Statistics | PU | UM |
|---|---|---|
| First downs | 10 | 22 |
| Plays–yards | 57–269 | 71–445 |
| Rushes–yards | 29–125 | 34–110 |
| Passing yards | 144 | 335 |
| Passing: comp–att–int | 12–28–1 | 24–37–0 |
| Turnovers | | |
| Time of possession | 26:06 | 33:54 |

| Team | Category | Player | Statistics |
|---|---|---|---|
| Purdue | Passing | Hudson Card | 12/28, 144 yards, 1 TD, 1 INT |
| Purdue | Rushing | Tyrone Tracy Jr. | 11 carries, 61 yards |
| Purdue | Receiving | Deion Burks | 3 receptions, 43 yards, 1 TD |
| Michigan | Passing | J. J. McCarthy | 24/37, 335 yards |
| Michigan | Rushing | Blake Corum | 15 carries, 44 yards, 3 TD |
| Michigan | Receiving | Roman Wilson | 9 receptions, 143 yards |

=== At Penn State ===
Michigan at Penn State
(rivalry)

| Team | 1 | 2 | 3 | 4 | Total |
|---|---|---|---|---|---|
| • No. 3 Wolverines | 0 | 14 | 3 | 7 | 24 |
| No. 10 Nittany Lions | 3 | 6 | 0 | 6 | 15 |

- Date: November 11
- Location: Beaver Stadium
  University Park, PA
- Game start: 12:06 p.m. EDT
- Elapsed time: 3:11
- Game attendance: 110,856
- Game weather: 45 °F (7 °C), sunny, NW 5 miles per hour (8.0 km/h)
- Referee: Gregory Blum
- TV announcers (Fox): Gus Johnson, Joel Klatt, and Jenny Taft

Scoring summary
| 1 | 2:17 | PSU | Alex Felkins 20-yard field goal | PSU 3–0 |
| 2 | 11:56 | MICH | Blake Corum 3-yard run (James Turner kick) | MICH 7–3 |
| 2 | 6:07 | MICH | Donovan Edwards 22-yard run (James Turner kick) | MICH 14–3 |
| 2 | 0:29 | PSU | Drew Allar 11-yard run | MICH 14–9 |
| 3 | 3:36 | MICH | James Turner 22-yard field goal | MICH 17–9 |
| 4 | 4:15 | MICH | Blake Corum 30-yard run (James Turner kick) | MICH 24–9 |
| 4 | 1:59 | PSU | Theo Johnson 8-yard pass from Drew Allar | MICH 24–15 |

Michigan traveled to State College, Pennsylvania, to face Penn State on November 11. As the Michigan team and coaching staff flew to Pennsylvania on Friday afternoon, Big Ten commissioner Tony Petitti suspended head coach Jim Harbaugh from game-day coaching for the remainder of the regular season as punishment for the Michigan Wolverines football sign-stealing scandal.

Michigan defeated Penn State, 24–15, before a crowd of 110,856 at Beaver Stadium. The first three drives of the game ended with punts. Penn State then drove 66 yards on 13 plays and became the first team to run a play inside Michigan's 10-yard line during the 2023 season. Facing a first-and-goal from the three-yard line, Michigan's defense stopped the Nittany Lions who settled for a 20-yard field goal by Alex Felkins. After Penn State's field goal, Michigan drove 75 yards on nine plays, including a 22-yard run by Donovan Edwards, a pass from J. J. McCarthy to Semaj Morgan for 19 yards and ending with a three-yard touchdown run by Blake Corum. After holding Penn State to a three-and-out, Michigan drove 78 yards on six plays, including a 44-yard run by Corum and a 22-yard touchdown run by Edwards. Late in the second quarter, Penn State drove 75 yards and scored on an 11-yard touchdown run by Drew Allar, though its attempt at a two-point conversion failed. Michigan led, 14–9 at halftime.

On the opening drive of the second half, Allar fumbled after having the ball stripped by Rayshaun Benny, and Michigan's Makari Paige recovered the loose ball at the Penn State 49-yard line. After the turnover, Michigan drove to the Penn State four-yard line, and James Turner kicked a 22-yard field goal. The defenses then took control of the game as six consecutive drives ended with punts. With four-and-a-half minutes remaining in the game, Michigan forced a turnover on downs as Allar threw an incomplete pass on fourth down. Corum ran 30 yards for a touchdown with 4:15 remaining in the game. In the closing minutes, Penn State drove 75 yards on eight plays, scoring on an eight-yard touchdown pass from Allar to Theo Johnson. Penn State again failed on an attempted two-point conversion. Penn State attempted an onside kick, but Mike Sainristil fell on the ball, and Michigan ran out the clock.

Starting with the final two plays of the first half, Michigan ran on 32 consecutive plays and did not throw a pass in the second half. (McCarthy's sole pass of the second half was negated by a pass-interference penalty.) Blake Corum carried the ball 26 times for 145 yards and two touchdowns. The team totaled 227 rushing yards against a Penn State defense that, prior to the game, had the top-ranked rushing defense in the county, having not allowed any opponent to rush for more than 100 yards in a game.

Michigan offensive coordinator Sherrone Moore served as the team's acting head coach. Harbaugh was not allowed to enter the stadium but in a postgame interview with Fox Sports, a tearful Moore expressed his love for Harbaugh, saying: "I want to thank Coach Harbaugh. I fucking love you, man. Love the shit out of you, man. This is for you."

Penn State's offense was limited to 74 passing yards. One day after the game, Penn State fired offensive coordinator Mike Yurcich.

The victory was the 999th in the history of the Michigan football program.

| Statistics | UM | PSU |
|---|---|---|
| First downs | 15 | 17 |
| Plays–yards | 54–287 | 58–238 |
| Rushes–yards | 46–227 | 35–164 |
| Passing yards | 60 | 74 |
| Passing: comp–att–int | 7–8–0 | 11–23–0 |
| Turnovers | | |
| Time of possession | 33:12 | 26:48 |

| Team | Category | Player | Statistics |
|---|---|---|---|
| Michigan | Passing | J. J. McCarthy | 7/8, 60 yards |
| Michigan | Rushing | Blake Corum | 26 carries, 145 yards, 2 TD |
| Michigan | Receiving | Cornelius Johnson | 2 receptions, 24 yards |
| Penn State | Passing | Drew Allar | 10/22, 70 yards, 1 TD |
| Penn State | Rushing | Kaytron Allen | 12 carries, 72 yards |
| Penn State | Receiving | Tyler Warren | 2 receptions, 25 yards |

=== At Maryland ===
Michigan at Maryland

| Team | 1 | 2 | 3 | 4 | Total |
|---|---|---|---|---|---|
| • No. 3 Wolverines | 16 | 7 | 6 | 2 | 31 |
| Terrapins | 3 | 7 | 14 | 0 | 24 |

- Date: November 18
- Location: SECU Stadium
  College Park, MD
- Game start: 12:11 p.m. EDT
- Elapsed time: 3:39
- Game attendance: 49,546
- Game weather: 55 °F (13 °C), sunny, NW 15 miles per hour (24 km/h)
- Referee: Larry Smith
- TV announcers (Fox): Gus Johnson, Joel Klatt, and Jenny Taft

Scoring summary
| 1 | 6:29 | UMD | Jack Howes 20-yard field goal | UMD 3–0 |
| 1 | 2:19 | MICH | Blake Corum 2-yard run (James Turner kick) | MICH 7–3 |
| 1 | 2:00 | MICH | Derrick Moore 4-yard fumble return (James Turner kick) | MICH 14–3 |
| 1 | 0:32 | MICH | Team safety | MICH 16–3 |
| 2 | 7:59 | MICH | Blake Corum 1-yard run (James Turner kick) | MICH 23–3 |
| 2 | 1:59 | UMD | Billy Edwards Jr. 1-yard run (Jack Howes kick) | MICH 23–10 |
| 3 | 10:23 | UMD | Billy Edwards Jr. 1-yard run (Jack Howes kick) | MICH 23–17 |
| 3 | 4:04 | MICH | Semaj Morgan 13-yard run | MICH 29–17 |
| 3 | 0:16 | UMD | Billy Edwards Jr. 1-yard run (Jack Howes kick) | MICH 29–24 |
| 4 | 3:38 | MICH | Team safety | MICH 31–24 |

Michigan filed an application for temporary restraining order (TRO), challenging the Big Ten's suspension of Jim Harbaugh for the final three games of the regular season. The court set the matter for a hearing in the Washtenaw County Circuit Court on November 17, one day before Michigan faced Maryland. However, the university dropped the case in exchange for the Big Ten ending its investigation into the scouting controversy before the case went to court.

On November 18, Michigan played Maryland at College Park, Maryland. Michigan defeated Maryland 31–24. Maryland opened the scoring in the first quarter via a 35-yard field goal by Jack Howes. Michigan responded with 16 points in the quarter via a two-yard touchdown run by Blake Corum, a four-yard fumble return by Derrick Moore and a Christian Boivin blocked punt for a safety. This was the first Michigan safety since the 2018 Peach Bowl. The teams exchanged touchdowns in the second quarter, first a one-yard touchdown run by Corum for Michigan, then a one-yard touchdown run by Billy Edwards Jr. for Maryland. Michigan led, 23–10 at halftime. Maryland scored 14 points in the third quarter via two one-yard touchdown runs by Edwards Jr. Michigan extended their lead via a 13-yard touchdown run by Semaj Morgan. On Maryland's final drive of the game, Tommy Doman's punt pinned the Terrapins at their own 1-yard with 4:10 remaining in the game. Michigan scored the only points of the fourth quarter after officials called intentional grounding for a safety. Mike Sainristil recorded two interceptions in the game.

With the win, the Wolverines became the first program in college football history to win 1,000 games. Michigan improved to 11–0 to start the season for the second consecutive season. This marked their first back-to-back 11–0 start since 1901 and 1902. With 141 passing yards in the game, quarterback J. J. McCarthy passed head coach Jim Harbaugh for eighth on the program's all-time passing list. With two rushing touchdowns in the game, Corum tied Hassan Haskins' single-season rushing touchdown record of 20 set in 2021.

| Statistics | UM | UMD |
|---|---|---|
| First downs | 20 | 17 |
| Plays–yards | 68–291 | 64–262 |
| Rushes–yards | 45–150 | 33–19 |
| Passing yards | 141 | 247 |
| Passing: comp–att–int | 12–23–1 | 21–31–2 |
| Turnovers | | |
| Time of possession | 30:56 | 29:04 |

| Team | Category | Player | Statistics |
|---|---|---|---|
| Michigan | Passing | J. J. McCarthy | 12/23, 141 yards, INT |
| Michigan | Rushing | Blake Corum | 28 carries, 94 yards, 2 TD |
| Michigan | Receiving | Colston Loveland | 3 receptions, 36 yards |
| Maryland | Passing | Taulia Tagovailoa | 21/31, 247 yards, 2 INT |
| Maryland | Rushing | Roman Hemby | 11 carries, 35 yards |
| Maryland | Receiving | Kaden Prather | 3 receptions, 81 yards |

=== Ohio State ===
Ohio State at Michigan
(The Game)

| Team | 1 | 2 | 3 | 4 | Total |
|---|---|---|---|---|---|
| No. 2 Buckeyes | 3 | 7 | 7 | 7 | 24 |
| • No. 3 Wolverines | 7 | 7 | 10 | 6 | 30 |

- Date: November 25
- Location: Michigan Stadium
  Ann Arbor, MI
- Game start: 12:15 p.m. EDT
- Elapsed time: 3:27
- Game attendance: 110,615
- Game weather: 35 °F (2 °C), sunny, S 5 miles per hour (8.0 km/h)
- Referee: Ron Snodgrass
- TV announcers (Fox): Gus Johnson, Joel Klatt, Jenny Taft, and Tom Rinaldi

Scoring summary
| 1 | 5:36 | MICH | Blake Corum 1-yard run (James Turner kick) | MICH 7–0 |
| 1 | 2:13 | OSU | Jayden Fielding 43-yard field goal | MICH 7–3 |
| 2 | 10:22 | MICH | Roman Wilson 22-yard pass from J. J. McCarthy (James Turner kick) | MICH 14–3 |
| 2 | 6:27 | OSU | Emeka Egbuka 3-yard pass from Kyle McCord (Jayden Fielding kick) | MICH 14–10 |
| 3 | 11:43 | MICH | James Turner 50-yard field goal | MICH 17–10 |
| 3 | 5:35 | OSU | TreVeyon Henderson 3-yard run (Jayden Fielding kick) | Tied 17–17 |
| 3 | 1:55 | MICH | Blake Corum 22-yard run (James Turner kick) | MICH 24–17 |
| 4 | 11:57 | MICH | James Turner 38-yard field goal | MICH 27–17 |
| 4 | 8:05 | OSU | Marvin Harrison Jr. 14-yard pass from Kyle McCord (Jayden Fielding kick) | MICH 27–24 |
| 4 | 1:05 | MICH | James Turner 37-yard field goal | MICH 30–24 |

On November 25, No. 3 Michigan defeated No. 2 Ohio State, 30–24, with both teams entering the game undefeated at 11–0. The game was played at Michigan Stadium before a crowd of 110,615. The programs met as top-three ranked opponents in back-to-back seasons for the first time in the history of the rivalry. With the victory, Michigan won the Big Ten East Division championship and improved to 12–0 for the second consecutive season.

Both teams began by trading punts on the first four drives. On Ohio State's third possession, Michigan's Will Johnson intercepted a Kyle McCord pass at Ohio State's 25-yard line, leading to a one-yard touchdown run by Blake Corum. Ohio State responded with a 51-yard drive, resulting in a 43-yard field goal by Jayden Fielding.

Michigan drove 75 yards early in the second quarter, scoring on a 22-yard touchdown pass from J. J. McCarthy to Roman Wilson. Ohio State responded again with a 73-yard drive, scoring on a three-yard touchdown pass from McCord to Emeka Egbuka. On the final play of the first half, Fielding attempted a 52-yard field goal; his first kick was good but did not count as Michigan had called timeout, and his second kick missed the mark. Michigan led, 14–10, at halftime.

On the opening drive of the second half, Michigan drove 46 yards and scored on a 50-yard field goal by James Turner. Ohio State responded with a 75-yard, six-minute drive, tying the game at 17–17 on a three-yard touchdown run by TreVeyon Henderson. Late in the third quarter, Michigan had a 75-yard scoring drive that was delayed for several minutes after Michigan All American offensive guard and captain Zak Zinter sustained a broken tibia and fibula and was taken off the field on a cart. On the first play after Zinter's injury, Corum ran 22 yards for a touchdown and held up the numbers six and five as a tribute to Zinter who wears jersey number 65 for the Wolverines. Michigan led, 24–17, at the end of the third quarter.

After forcing Ohio State to punt, Michigan drove 44 yards, including a 34-yard pass from Donovan Edwards to Colston Loveland, and ending with a 38-yard field goal by James Turner to give them a 10-point lead. Ohio State responded with a 65-yard touchdown drive, including a 28-yard pass from McCord to Julian Fleming and culminating with a 14-yard touchdown pass from McCord to Marvin Harrison Jr. with 8 minutes left. Michigan responded with a time-consuming, seven-minute, 13-play drive that ended with a 34-yard field goal – Turner's third of the game. Ohio State's final drive ended with Michigan defensive back Rod Moore intercepting a McCord pass.

Sherrone Moore served as Michigan's acting head coach as Jim Harbaugh served the third and final game of a suspension imposed by Big Ten commissioner Tony Petitti. In his postgame interview with Jenny Taft, Moore said: "Coach Harbaugh, we got your back, baby. We love you. That was for you, baby."

With two rushing touchdowns, Blake Corum celebrated his 23rd birthday and set a new Michigan single-season record with 22 rushing touchdowns. Corum is the only player in the FBS to score in each game of the 2023 season.

J. J. McCarthy completed 16 of 20 passes for 148 yards and a touchdown. For Ohio State, Kyle McCord completed 18 of 30 for 271 yards, two touchdowns and two interceptions. The receivers were led by Ohio State's Marvin Harrison Jr. who caught five passes for 118 yards and a touchdown. Colston Loveland was Michigan's leading receiver with five catches for 88 yards.

| Statistics | OSU | UM |
|---|---|---|
| First downs | 22 | 18 |
| Plays–yards | 58–378 | 60–338 |
| Rushes–yards | 28–107 | 39–156 |
| Passing yards | 271 | 182 |
| Passing: comp–att–int | 18–30–2 | 17–21–0 |
| Turnovers | | |
| Time of possession | 26:32 | 33:28 |

| Team | Category | Player | Statistics |
|---|---|---|---|
| Ohio State | Passing | Kyle McCord | 18/30, 271 yards, 2 TD, 2 INT |
| Ohio State | Rushing | TreVeyon Henderson | 19 carries, 60 yards, 1 TD |
| Ohio State | Receiving | Marvin Harrison Jr. | 5 receptions, 118 yards, 1 TD |
| Michigan | Passing | J. J. McCarthy | 16/20, 148 yards, 1 TD |
| Michigan | Rushing | Blake Corum | 22 carries, 88 yards, 2 TD |
| Michigan | Receiving | Colston Loveland | 5 receptions, 88 yards |

=== vs Iowa—Big Ten Championship Game ===
Michigan vs. Iowa
(Big Ten Championship Game)

| Team | 1 | 2 | 3 | 4 | Total |
|---|---|---|---|---|---|
| • No. 2 Wolverines | 10 | 0 | 10 | 6 | 26 |
| No. 16 Hawkeyes | 0 | 0 | 0 | 0 | 0 |

- Date: December 2
- Location: Lucas Oil Stadium
  Indianapolis, IN
- Game start: 8:17 p.m. EDT
- Elapsed time: 3:17
- Game attendance: 67,842
- Game weather: Indoors
- Referee: Jeff Servinski
- TV announcers (Fox): Gus Johnson, Joel Klatt, and Jenny Taft

Scoring summary
| 1 | 6:01 | MICH | James Turner 35-yard field goal | MICH 3–0 |
| 1 | 1:07 | MICH | Blake Corum 2-yard run (James Turner kick) | MICH 10–0 |
| 3 | 9:09 | MICH | Blake Corum 6-yard run (James Turner kick) | MICH 17–0 |
| 3 | 0:22 | MICH | James Turner 46-yard field goal | MICH 20–0 |
| 4 | 9:14 | MICH | James Turner 36-yard field goal | MICH 23–0 |
| 4 | 3:38 | MICH | James Turner 50-yard field goal | MICH 26–0 |

On December 2, Michigan defeated Iowa, 26–0, in the Big Ten Football Championship Game at Lucas Oil Stadium in Indianapolis. It was Michigan's third consecutive victory in the conference championship game.

After holding Iowa to a three-and-out on the opening drive, Michigan drove 52 yards and took the lead on a 35-yard field goal by James Turner. After Iowa was stopped on its second possession, Semaj Morgan returned Tory Taylor's punt 82 yards to the Iowa five-yard line. Michigan scored on a two-yard touchdown run by Blake Corum and led, 10–0, at the end of the first quarter.

The defenses took hold of the game in the second quarter, as the teams punted seven times with no points being scored. Michigan led, 10–0, at halftime.

In the third quarter, Michigan's defense continued to stymie Iowa's offense. Mike Sainristil forced a fumble by Iowa quarterback Deacon Hill, recovered by Josh Wallace at Iowa's 12-yard line. The play was initially ruled an incomplete pass, but after review it was determined that Hill's arm had not begun its forward motion when the ball came loose. Iowa offensive coordinator Brian Ferentz was penalized for unsportsmanlike conduct for his protest of call, resulting in the ball being spotted at Iowa's six-yard line. On the next play after the penalty, Corum scored on a six-yard run for his 55th career touchdown, tying Anthony Thomas for Michigan's modern-era record for rushing touchdowns. After Iowa failed to convert on a fourth down, Turner kicked a 46-yard field goal, and Michigan led, 20–0, at the end of the third quarter.

Early in the fourth quarter, Braiden McGregor forced another fumble by Deacon Hill with Kenneth Grant recovering the ball at Iowa's 15-yard line. Michigan settled for a 36-yard field goal by Turner. Later in the quarter, Michigan again stopped Iowa on fourth down, and Turner kicked his fourth field goal of the game, a 50-yarder, with 3:38 remaining. Turner's 50-yard field goal was the longest in Big Ten Championship game history. Michigan won by a final score of 26–0.

The game was dominated by strong defensive play. Iowa was limited to 155 yards of total offense (35 rushing and 120 passing). Michigan's defense had four fourth-down stops and forced and recovered three fumbles. Iowa's defense also played well, holding Michigan to a season-low 213 yards of total offense (66 rushing and 147 passing). Michigan defensive back Mike Sainristil was named the game's most valuable payer.

With 16 carries for 52 yards, running back Blake Corum passed 1,000-yards on the season. He became the first player with back-to-back 1,000-yard rushing seasons since Denard Robinson. Semaj Morgan's 87-yard punt return was the longest in Big Ten Championship game history, and the third-longest in modern-era program history. Mike Sainristil was named tournament MVP after he forced two fumbles and a sack in the game.

| Statistics | UM | IOWA |
|---|---|---|
| First downs | 12 | 7 |
| Plays–yards | 64–213 | 56–155 |
| Rushes–yards | 34–66 | 24–35 |
| Passing yards | 147 | 120 |
| Passing: comp–att–int | 22–30–0 | 18–32–0 |
| Turnovers | | |
| Time of possession | 36:32 | 23:28 |

| Team | Category | Player | Statistics |
|---|---|---|---|
| Michigan | Passing | J. J. McCarthy | 22/30, 147 yards |
| Michigan | Rushing | Blake Corum | 16 carries, 52 yards, 2 TD |
| Michigan | Receiving | Cornelius Johnson | 9 receptions, 64 yards |
| Iowa | Passing | Deacon Hill | 18/32, 120 yards |
| Iowa | Rushing | Leshon Williams | 9 carries, 25 yards |
| Iowa | Receiving | Addison Ostrenga | 7 receptions, 50 yards |

=== vs. Alabama—Rose Bowl (CFP Semifinal) ===
No. 4 Alabama vs. No. 1 Michigan
(Rose Bowl–CFP Semifinal)

| Team | 1 | 2 | 3 | 4 | OT | Total |
|---|---|---|---|---|---|---|
| No. 4 Crimson Tide | 7 | 3 | 0 | 10 | 0 | 20 |
| • No. 1 Wolverines | 7 | 6 | 0 | 7 | 7 | 27 |

- Date: Monday, January 1
- Location: Rose Bowl
  Pasadena, CA
- Game start: 2:11 p.m. PST
- Elapsed time: 3:32
- Game attendance: 96,371
- Game weather: 64 °F (18 °C), sunny, S 2 miles per hour (3.2 km/h)
- Referee: Michael Vandervelde
- TV announcers (ESPN): Chris Fowler, Kirk Herbstreit, Holly Rowe, and Laura Rutledge

Scoring summary
| 1 | 9:41 | ALA | Jase McClellan 34-yard run (Will Reichard kick) | ALA 7–0 |
| 1 | 4:23 | MICH | Blake Corum 8-yard pass from J. J. McCarthy (James Turner kick) | Tied 7–7 |
| 2 | 3:49 | MICH | Tyler Morris 38-yard pass from J. J. McCarthy (kick missed) | MICH 13–7 |
| 2 | 0:07 | ALA | Will Reichard 50-yard field goal | MICH 13–10 |
| 4 | 14:30 | ALA | Jase McClellan 3-yard run (Will Reichard kick) | ALA 17–13 |
| 4 | 4:41 | ALA | Will Reichard 52-yard field goal | ALA 20–13 |
| 4 | 1:34 | MICH | Roman Wilson 4-yard pass from J. J. McCarthy (James Turner kick) | Tied 20–20 |
| OT | 0:00 | MICH | Blake Corum 17-yard run (James Turner kick) | MICH 27–20 |

In the final College Football Playoff rankings of the year announced on December 3, Michigan (13–0) was ranked No. 1, earning their third consecutive playoff bid and a spot in the semifinal game which was played at the 2024 Rose Bowl against No. 4 Alabama (12–1).

Michigan defeated Alabama 27–20 in overtime. Alabama opened the scoring in the first quarter via a 34-yard touchdown run from Jase McClellan. Michigan responded with an eight-yard touchdown pass from J. J. McCarthy to Blake Corum to tie the game. Michigan took their first lead of the game late in the second quarter via a 38-yard touchdown pass from McCarthy to Tyler Morris. Alabama scored the final points of the half via a 50-yard field goal by Will Reichard. Michigan led, 13–10, at halftime. After a scoreless third quarter, Alabama scored ten points in the fourth quarter via a three-yard touchdown run from McClellan and a 52-yard field goal by Reichard to regain the lead. This marked the first time Michigan trailed in a second half all season. Michigan scored the final points of the quarter via a four-yard touchdown pass from McCarthy to Roman Wilson to tie the game and force overtime. Michigan scored in overtime via a 17-yard touchdown run from Corum. The Michigan defense was then able to pick up a 4th-down stop to win the game and send them to the national championship.

With the win, Michigan set a single-season program record of 14 victories. With his 17-yard rushing touchdown in overtime, Blake Corum passed Anthony Thomas as Michigan's career rushing touchdowns leader. Michigan's defense recorded five sacks in the first half alone, setting an all-time College Football Playoff record for sacks in a half.

| Statistics | ALA | UM |
|---|---|---|
| First downs | 17 | 15 |
| Plays–yards | 66–288 | 59–351 |
| Rushes–yards | 43–172 | 32–130 |
| Passing yards | 116 | 221 |
| Passing: comp–att–int | 16–23–0 | 17–27–0 |
| Turnovers | | |
| Time of possession | 32:19 | 27:41 |

| Team | Category | Player | Statistics |
|---|---|---|---|
| Alabama | Passing | Jalen Milroe | 16/23, 116 yards |
| Alabama | Rushing | Jase McClellan | 14 carries, 87 yards, 2 TD |
| Alabama | Receiving | Isaiah Bond | 4 receptions, 47 yards |
| Michigan | Passing | J. J. McCarthy | 17/27, 221 yards, 3 TD |
| Michigan | Rushing | Blake Corum | 19 carries, 83 yards, 1 TD |
| Michigan | Receiving | Roman Wilson | 4 receptions, 73 yards, 1 TD |

=== vs. Washington—CFP National Championship ===
No. 2 Washington vs. No. 1 Michigan
(CFP National Championship)

| Team | 1 | 2 | 3 | 4 | Total |
|---|---|---|---|---|---|
| No. 2 Huskies | 3 | 7 | 3 | 0 | 13 |
| • No. 1 Wolverines | 14 | 3 | 3 | 14 | 34 |

- Date: Monday, January 8
- Location: NRG Stadium
  Houston, TX
- Game start: 6:46 p.m. CST
- Elapsed time: 3:24
- Game attendance: 72,808
- Game weather: Indoors
- Referee: Marcus Woods
- TV announcers (ESPN): Chris Fowler, Kirk Herbstreit, Holly Rowe, and Molly McGrath

Scoring summary
| 1 | 10:14 | MICH | Donovan Edwards 41-yard run (James Turner kick) | MICH 7–0 |
| 1 | 3:56 | WASH | Grady Gross 25-yard field goal | MICH 7–3 |
| 1 | 2:23 | MICH | Donovan Edwards 46-yard run (James Turner kick) | MICH 14–3 |
| 2 | 13:28 | MICH | James Turner 31-yard field goal | MICH 17–3 |
| 2 | 0:42 | WASH | Jalen McMillan 3-yard pass from Michael Penix Jr. (Grady Gross kick) | MICH 17–10 |
| 3 | 11:55 | MICH | James Turner 38-yard field goal | MICH 20–10 |
| 3 | 8:58 | WASH | Grady Gross 45-yard field goal | MICH 20–13 |
| 4 | 7:09 | MICH | Blake Corum 12-yard run (James Turner kick) | MICH 27–13 |
| 4 | 3:37 | MICH | Blake Corum 1-yard run (James Turner kick) | MICH 34–13 |

No. 1 Michigan (14–0) faced No. 2 Washington (14–0) in the 2024 CFP National Championship. Both teams made their first appearance in the championship game in the CFP era. This was the third all-time meeting between 14–0 teams in the CFP National Championship following Clemson and Alabama in 2019 and Clemson and LSU in 2020.

Michigan defeated Washington 34–13. Michigan scored 14 points in the first quarter via two rushing touchdowns by Donovan Edwards, from 41-yards, and 46-yards, respectively. Washington responded with a 25-yard field goal by Grady Gross. Edwards became the first player in CFP National Championship game history to run for two touchdowns of 40-plus yards. Michigan extended their lead in the second quarter via a 31-yard field goal by James Turner. Washington scored the final points of the half via a three-yard touchdown pass from Michael Penix Jr. to Jalen McMillan. Michigan led, 17–10 at halftime. The teams exchanged field goals in the third quarter, first a 38-yard field goal by Turner for Michigan, aided by an interception from Will Johnson on the first play from scrimmage in the second half, then a 45-yard field goal by Gross for Washington. Michigan scored 14 points in the fourth quarter via two rushing touchdowns by Blake Corum, from 12-yards, and one-yard, respectively. In the fourth quarter, Mike Sainristil recorded his team-leading sixth interception of the season, returning it for a season-long 81 yards. It was the longest interception return in CFP National Championship game history.

With the win, Michigan set a single-season program record of 15 victories. Michigan finished as undefeated College Football Playoff champions, and won their 12th national title in program history, and first since the 1997 season. Michigan's offense finished with 303 total rushing yards, a season-high and a CFP National Championship game high.

| Statistics | UW | UM |
|---|---|---|
| First downs | 17 | 16 |
| Plays–yards | 71–301 | 57–443 |
| Rushes–yards | 20–46 | 38–303 |
| Passing yards | 255 | 140 |
| Passing: comp–att–int | 27–51–2 | 10–19–0 |
| Turnovers | | |
| Time of possession | 30:44 | 29:16 |

| Team | Category | Player | Statistics |
|---|---|---|---|
| Washington | Passing | Michael Penix Jr. | 27/51, 255 yards, 1 TD, 2 INT |
| Washington | Rushing | Dillon Johnson | 11 carries, 33 yards |
| Washington | Receiving | Rome Odunze | 5 receptions, 87 yards |
| Michigan | Passing | J. J. McCarthy | 10/18, 140 yards |
| Michigan | Rushing | Blake Corum | 21 carries, 134 yards, 2 TD |
| Michigan | Receiving | Colston Loveland | 3 receptions, 64 yards |

== Personnel ==
=== Roster ===
2023 Michigan Wolverines football team roster
Players
Coaches
Offense

| Pos. | # | Name | Class |
|---|---|---|---|
| WR | 0 | Darrius Clemons | So |
| WR | 1 | Roman Wilson | Sr |
| RB | 2 | Blake Corum (C) | Sr |
| WR | 3 | Fredrick Moore | Fr |
| QB | 4 | Jayden Denegal | Fr |
| WR | 5 | Karmello English | Fr |
| WR | 6 | Cornelius Johnson | Sr |
| RB | 7 | Donovan Edwards | Jr |
| WR | 8 | Tyler Morris | So |
| QB | 9 | J. J. McCarthy | Jr |
| QB | 10 | Alex Orji | Fr |
| WR | 12 | Kendrick Bell | Fr |
| QB | 13 | Jack Tuttle | Sr |
| WR | 14 | Zack Grusser | Fr |
| TE | 15 | Deakon Tonielli | Fr |
| QB | 16 | Davis Warren | So |
| TE | 17 | Marlin Klein | Fr |
| TE | 18 | Colston Loveland | So |
| RB | 20 | Kalel Mullings | Sr |
| RB | 22 | Tavierre Dunlap | So |
| RB | 23 | C. J. Stokes | So |
| RB | 24 | Cole Cabana | Fr |
| WR | 26 | Jake Thaw | Jr |
| WR | 27 | Christian Bartholomew | Jr |
| RB | 28 | Benjamin Hall | Fr |
| WR | 30 | Will Rolapp | Jr |
| TE | 33 | Noah Stewart | Jr |
| RB | 34 | Leon Franklin | Sr |
| WR | 35 | Logan Forbes | Fr |
| RB | 37 | Danny Hughes | Sr |
| WR | 39 | Joe Taylor | So |
| TE | 40 | Josh Beetham | Jr |
| RB | 41 | Bryson Kuzdzal | Fr |
| TE | 42 | Jalen Hoffman | Fr |
| TE | 44 | Max Bredeson | So |
| TE | 45 | Noah Howes | So |
| RB | 49 | Henry Donohue | So |
| OL | 50 | Amir Herring | Fr |
| OL | 51 | Greg Crippen | So |
| OL | 52 | Karsen Barnhart | Sr |
| OL | 53 | Trente Jones | Sr |
| OL | 55 | Nathan Efobi | Fr |
| OL | 56 | Dominick Giudice | So |
| OL | 58 | Giovanni El-Hadi | So |
| C | 60 | Drake Nugent | Sr |
| OL | 62 | Raheem Anderson | So |
| OL | 65 | Zak Zinter (C) | Sr |
| OL | 71 | Evan Link | Fr |
| OL | 72 | Tristan Bounds | So |
| OL | 73 | LaDarius Henderson | Sr |
| OL | 74 | Reece Atteberry | Jr |
| OL | 75 | Andrew Gentry | Fr |
| OL | 76 | Connor Jones | Fr |
| OL | 77 | Trevor Keegan (C) | Sr |
| OL | 78 | Myles Hinton | Sr |
| OL | 79 | Jeffrey Persi | Jr |
| WR | 80 | Eamonn Dennis | Jr |
| WR | 81 | Peyton O'Leary | So |
| WR | 82 | Semaj Morgan | Fr |
| TE | 83 | Zack Marshall | Fr |
| WR | 84 | Dale Chesson | Sr |
| WR | 85 | Cristian Dixon | So |
| WR | 86 | Zach Peterson | Sr |
| TE | 88 | Matthew Hibner | Jr |
| TE | 89 | AJ Barner | Sr |

Defense

| Pos. | # | Name | Class |
|---|---|---|---|
| DB | 0 | Mike Sainristil (C) | Sr |
| DB | 1 | Amorion Walker | So |
| DB | 2 | Will Johnson | So |
| DB | 3 | Keon Sabb | Fr |
| LB | 4 | Micah Pollard | So |
| EDGE | 5 | Josaiah Stewart | Jr |
| DB | 6 | Brandyn Hillman | Fr |
| DB | 7 | Makari Paige | Sr |
| EDGE | 8 | Derrick Moore | So |
| DB | 9 | Rod Moore | Jr |
| DB | 10 | Zeke Berry | Fr |
| DB | 12 | Josh Wallace | Sr |
| DB | 13 | DJ Waller Jr. | Fr |
| DB | 14 | Kody Jones | Fr |
| LB | 15 | Ernest Hausmann | So |
| LB | 16 | Semaj Bridgeman | Fr |
| EDGE | 17 | Braiden McGregor | Jr |
| DB | 18 | Ja'Den McBurrows | So |
| LB | 19 | Jason Hewlett | Fr |
| DB | 20 | Jyaire Hill | Fr |
| DB | 22 | Cameron Calhoun | Fr |
| LB | 23 | Michael Barrett (C) | Sr |
| DB | 24 | Myles Pollard | Fr |
| LB | 25 | Junior Colson | Jr |
| DL | 26 | Rayshaun Benny | So |
| EDGE | 27 | Tyler McLaurin | So |
| DB | 28 | Quinten Johnson | Sr |
| DB | 29 | Joshua Nichols | Fr |
| LB | 29 | Joey Velazquez | Sr |
| LB | 30 | Jimmy Rolder | So |
| DB | 31 | Nico Andrighetto | Fr |
| EDGE | 32 | Jaylen Harrell | Jr |
| DB | 33 | German Green | Sr |
| LB | 34 | Jaydon Hood | So |
| DB | 35 | Caden Kolesar | Sr |
| DB | 36 | Keshaun Harris | Sr |
| DB | 37 | Micah Davis | Fr |
| DB | 38 | Bryce Wilcox | Fr |
| LB | 39 | Jack MacKinnon | Fr |
| LB | 40 | Christian Boivin | So |
| DB | 41 | Joshua Luther | Sr |
| EDGE | 42 | TJ Guy | So |
| DB | 43 | Jesse Madden | So |
| LB | 44 | Hayden Moore | Fr |
| DB | 46 | Brandon Mann | Fr |
| LB | 50 | Jerome Nichols | Jr |
| DL | 51 | Brooks Bahr | Fr |
| EDGE | 52 | Kechaun Bennett | So |
| LB | 53 | Liam Groulx | Fr |
| LB | 54 | Joel Metzger | So |
| DL | 55 | Mason Graham | So |
| LB | 57 | Trevor Andrews | So |
| EDGE | 58 | Breeon Ishmail | Fr |
| DL | 70 | Peter Simmons | So |
| DT | 78 | Kenneth Grant | So |
| DL | 89 | Alessandro Lorenzetti | Fr |
| EDGE | 90 | Aymeric Koumba | Fr |
| DL | 91 | Cameron Brandt | Fr |
| DL | 92 | Ike Iwunnah | So |
| EDGE | 93 | Joey Klunder | Fr |
| DL | 94 | Kris Jenkins (C) | Jr |
| DL | 95 | Trey Pierce | Fr |
| DL | 96 | Enow Etta | Fr |
| EDGE | 97 | Chibi Anwunah | So |
| DT | 99 | Cam Goode | Sr |

Special teams

| Pos. | # | Name | Class |
|---|---|---|---|
| K, P | 19 | Tommy Doman | So |
| K | 32 | James Turner | Sr |
| LS | 45 | Greg Tarr | Jr |
| LS | 46 | Evan Boutorwick | Fr |
| LS | 49 | William Wagner | Sr |
| LS | 64 | James Kavouklis | Fr |
| K | 90 | Hudson Hollenbeck | Fr |
| K | 99 | Adam Samaha | Fr |

Head coach

- Jim Harbaugh

Coordinators/assistant coaches

- Jack Harbaugh (assistant head coach)
- Ben Herbert (associate head coach / strength and conditioning coach)
- Sherrone Moore (offensive coordinator / offensive line)
- Jesse Minter (defensive coordinator)
- Steve Clinkscale (co-defensive coordinator / defensive backs / defensive pass game coordinator)
- Jay Harbaugh (special teams coordinator / safeties)
- Kirk Campbell (quarterbacks)
- Mike Hart (running backs / run game coordinator)
- Ron Bellamy (wide receivers)
- Grant Newsome (tight ends)
- Mike Elston (defensive line / recruiting coordinator)
- Chris Partridge (linebackers; fired Nov. 7)

Support staff

- Bradford Banta (special teams analyst)
- J.B. Brown (special teams analyst)
- Jack Clark (offensive analyst)
- Nick Gilbert (offensive analyst)
- Bret Ingalls (senior offensive analyst)
- Fred Jackson (senior offensive analyst / running backs)
- Doug Mallory (defensive analyst)
- Mike Mallory (special teams analyst)
- Rick Minter (defensive analyst / interim linebackers)
- Denard Robinson (assistant director of player personnel)
- Josh Sinagoga (offensive analyst)

Legend

- (C) Team captain
- (S) Suspended
- (I) Ineligible
- Injured
- Redshirt

Roster

=== Depth chart ===
Defense

FS
Rod Moore
Keon Sabb
Zeke Berry

| MIKE | WILL | NICKEL |
|---|---|---|
| Junior Colson | Michael Barrett | Mike Sainristil |
| Jimmy Rolder | Ernest Hausmann | Ja'Den McBurrows |
| Jaydon Hood | Jason Hewlett | Zeke Berry |

SS
Makari Paige
Quinten Johnson
Brandyn Hillman

CB
Will Johnson
Ja'Den McBurrows
Jyaire Hill

| DE | DT | DT | DE |
|---|---|---|---|
| Braiden McGregor | Mason Graham | Kris Jenkins | Jaylen Harrell |
| Derrick Moore | Kenneth Grant | Rayshaun Benny | Josaiah Stewart |
| TJ Guy | Cam Goode | Trey Pierce | Cameron Brandt |

CB
Josh Wallace
D.J. Waller Jr.
Amorion Walker

Offense

WR
Roman Wilson
Darrius Clemons
Kendrick Bell

WR
Tyler Morris
Semaj Morgan
Karmello English

| LT | LG | C | RG | RT |
|---|---|---|---|---|
| LaDarius Henderson | Trevor Keegan | Drake Nugent | Zak Zinter | Karsen Barnhart |
| Myles Hinton | Giovanni El-Hadi | Greg Crippen | Jeffrey Persi | Trente Jones |
| Evan Link | Nathan Efobi | Raheem Anderson | Dominick Giudice | Andrew Gentry |

TE
Colston Loveland
AJ Barner
Max Bredeson

WR
Cornelius Johnson
Fredrick Moore
Peyton O'Leary

QB
J. J. McCarthy
Alex Orji
Jack Tuttle

RB
Blake Corum
Donovan Edwards
Kalel Mullings

Special teams
PK James Turner
P Tommy Doman

=== 2023 recruiting class ===
College recruiting
| Name | Hometown | School | Height | Weight | Commit date |
|---|---|---|---|---|---|
| Enow Etta; DL | Keller, Texas | Covenant Christian Academy | 6 ft 4 in (1.93 m) | 260 lb (120 kg) | Jul 13, 2022 |
| Enow Etta; DL | Recruit ratings: Rivals: 247Sports: ESPN: | | | | |
| Cole Cabana; RB | Dexter, Michigan | Dexter High School | 6 ft 0 in (1.83 m) | 180 lb (82 kg) | Feb 5, 2022 |
| Cole Cabana; RB | Recruit ratings: Rivals: 247Sports: ESPN: | | | | |
| Jyaire Hill; ATH | Kankakee, Illinois | Kankakee High School | 6 ft 1 in (1.85 m) | 170 lb (77 kg) | Dec 21, 2022 |
| Jyaire Hill; ATH | Recruit ratings: Rivals: 247Sports: ESPN: | | | | |
| Karmello English; WR | Phenix City, Alabama | Central High School | 5 ft 11 in (1.80 m) | 175 lb (79 kg) | Dec 21, 2022 |
| Karmello English; WR | Recruit ratings: Rivals: 247Sports: ESPN: | | | | |
| Brandyn Hillman; ATH | Portsmouth, Virginia | Churchland High School | 6 ft 1 in (1.85 m) | 191 lb (87 kg) | Mar 19, 2023 |
| Brandyn Hillman; ATH | Recruit ratings: Rivals: 247Sports: ESPN: | | | | |
| Evan Link; OT | Burke, Virginia | Gonzaga College High School | 6 ft 6 in (1.98 m) | 290 lb (130 kg) | Aug 1, 2022 |
| Evan Link; OT | Recruit ratings: Rivals: 247Sports: ESPN: | | | | |
| Amir Herring; IOL | Southfield, Michigan | West Bloomfield High School | 6 ft 3 in (1.91 m) | 300 lb (140 kg) | Jul 7, 2022 |
| Amir Herring; IOL | Recruit ratings: Rivals: 247Sports: ESPN: | | | | |
| Semaj Bridgeman; LB | Philadelphia, Pennsylvania | Imhotep Institute Charter High School | 6 ft 2 in (1.88 m) | 230 lb (100 kg) | Jul 1, 2022 |
| Semaj Bridgeman; LB | Recruit ratings: Rivals: 247Sports: ESPN: | | | | |
| Nathan Efobi; IOL | Cumming, Georgia | South Forsyth High School | 6 ft 3 in (1.91 m) | 282 lb (128 kg) | Nov 18, 2022 |
| Nathan Efobi; IOL | Recruit ratings: Rivals: 247Sports: ESPN: | | | | |
| Cameron Calhoun; CB | Cincinnati, Ohio | Winton Woods High School | 6 ft 0 in (1.83 m) | 170 lb (77 kg) | Nov 26, 2022 |
| Cameron Calhoun; CB | Recruit ratings: Rivals: 247Sports: ESPN: | | | | |
| Deakon Tonielli; TE | Oswego, Illinois | Oswego High School | 6 ft 6 in (1.98 m) | 215 lb (98 kg) | Jun 19, 2022 |
| Deakon Tonielli; TE | Recruit ratings: Rivals: 247Sports: ESPN: | | | | |
| Cameron Brandt; DL | Chatsworth, California | Sierra Canyon School | 6 ft 4 in (1.93 m) | 260 lb (120 kg) | Feb 1, 2023 |
| Cameron Brandt; DL | Recruit ratings: Rivals: 247Sports: ESPN: | | | | |
| Semaj Morgan; WR | West Bloomfield, Michigan | West Bloomfield High School | 5 ft 10 in (1.78 m) | 175 lb (79 kg) | Dec 1, 2021 |
| Semaj Morgan; WR | Recruit ratings: Rivals: 247Sports: ESPN: | | | | |
| Fredrick Moore; WR | St. Louis, Missouri | Cardinal Ritter College Prep High School | 6 ft 0 in (1.83 m) | 175 lb (79 kg) | Jul 1, 2022 |
| Fredrick Moore; WR | Recruit ratings: Rivals: 247Sports: ESPN: | | | | |
| Jason Hewlett; ATH | Youngstown, Ohio | Chaney High School | 6 ft 4 in (1.93 m) | 220 lb (100 kg) | Nov 28, 2022 |
| Jason Hewlett; ATH | Recruit ratings: Rivals: 247Sports: ESPN: | | | | |
| Zack Marshall; ATH | Solana Beach, California | Carlsbad High School | 6 ft 4 in (1.93 m) | 220 lb (100 kg) | Aug 13, 2022 |
| Zack Marshall; ATH | Recruit ratings: Rivals: 247Sports: ESPN: | | | | |
| Trey Pierce; DL | Evergreen Park, Illinois | Brother Rice High School | 6 ft 3 in (1.91 m) | 290 lb (130 kg) | Dec 14, 2022 |
| Trey Pierce; DL | Recruit ratings: Rivals: 247Sports: ESPN: | | | | |
| Brooks Bahr; DL | Lake Forest, Illinois | Loyola Academy | 6 ft 6 in (1.98 m) | 270 lb (120 kg) | Mar 15, 2022 |
| Brooks Bahr; DL | Recruit ratings: Rivals: 247Sports: ESPN: | | | | |
| Benjamin Hall; RB | Acworth, Georgia | North Cobb High School | 5 ft 10 in (1.78 m) | 225 lb (102 kg) | Mar 29, 2022 |
| Benjamin Hall; RB | Recruit ratings: Rivals: 247Sports: ESPN: | | | | |
| Aymeric Koumba; EDGE | Bordeaux, France | Lycée Alfred Kastler | 6 ft 4 in (1.93 m) | 230 lb (100 kg) | Jul 15, 2022 |
| Aymeric Koumba; EDGE | Recruit ratings: Rivals: 247Sports: ESPN: | | | | |
| Kendrick Bell; ATH | Kansas City, Missouri | Park Hill High School | 6 ft 3 in (1.91 m) | 180 lb (82 kg) | Oct 17, 2022 |
| Kendrick Bell; ATH | Recruit ratings: Rivals: 247Sports: ESPN: | | | | |
| Hayden Moore; LB | Parker, Colorado | Regis Jesuit High School | 6 ft 3 in (1.91 m) | 210 lb (95 kg) | Dec 19, 2022 |
| Hayden Moore; LB | Recruit ratings: Rivals: 247Sports: ESPN: | | | | |
| Breeon Ishmail; LB | Hamilton, Ohio | Princeton High School | 6 ft 4 in (1.93 m) | 220 lb (100 kg) | Nov 25, 2022 |
| Breeon Ishmail; LB | Recruit ratings: Rivals: 247Sports: ESPN: | | | | |
| D.J. Waller Jr. CB | Struthers, Ohio | Chaney High School | 6 ft 3 in (1.91 m) | 195 lb (88 kg) | Dec 18, 2022 |
| D.J. Waller Jr. CB | Recruit ratings: Rivals: 247Sports: ESPN: | | | | |
| Adam Samaha; K | Ypsilanti, Michigan | Huron High School | 6 ft 0 in (1.83 m) | 170 lb (77 kg) | Nov 25, 2021 |
| Adam Samaha; K | Recruit ratings: Rivals: 247Sports: ESPN: | | | | |
Overall recruit ranking: Rivals: 17 247Sports: 18
Note: In many cases, Scout, Rivals, 247Sports, On3, and ESPN may conflict in their listings of height and weight.; In these cases, the average was taken. ESPN grades are on a 100-point scale.; Sources: "2023 Michigan football commitments". Rivals.; "2023 Team Ranking". Rivals.com.; "2023 Michigan football commitments". 247Sports.

=== Incoming transfers ===
Michigan incoming transfers
| Name | Pos. | Height | Weight | Year | Hometown | Previous team |
|---|---|---|---|---|---|---|
| AJ Barner | TE | 6'6" | 250 | SR | Aurora, Ohio | Indiana |
| Ernest Hausmann | LB | 6'2" | 220 | SO | Columbus, Nebraska | Nebraska |
| LaDarius Henderson | OL | 6'4" | 270 | GS | Waxahachie, Texas | Arizona State |
| Myles Hinton | OL | 6'6" | 308 | SR | John's Creek, Georgia | Stanford |
| Drake Nugent | C | 6'2" | 275 | GS | Lone Tree, Colorado | Stanford |
| Josaiah Stewart | EDGE | 6'2" | 235 | JR | Bronx, New York | Coastal Carolina |
| James Turner | K | 6'1" | 200 | GS | Saline, Michigan | Louisville |
| Jack Tuttle | QB | 6'4" | 212 | GS | San Marcos, California | Indiana |
| Josh Wallace | CB | 6'0" | 190 | GS | Bowie, Maryland | UMass |

== Awards and honors ==
All-American
| Player | AP | AFCA | FWAA | TSN | WCFF | ESPN | CBS | Athletic | USAT | SI | FOX | Designation |
|---|---|---|---|---|---|---|---|---|---|---|---|---|
| Zak Zinter | 1 | 1 | 1 | 1 | 1 | 1 | 2 | 1 | 1 | 1 | 1 | Unanimous |
| Blake Corum | 3 | 1 | 2 | | 2 | | | | 2 | | 2 | |
| Will Johnson | | | | | | | | 2 | 2 | 1 | | |
| Mike Sainristil | | | | 1 | | 1 | 2 | | | 2 | 1 | |
| Mason Graham | | | | 2 | | | | | | | | |
| Kris Jenkins Jr. | 3 | 2 | 2 | | | | | | | | | |
The NCAA recognizes a selection to all five of the AP, AFCA, FWAA, TSN and WCFF first teams for unanimous selections and three of five for consensus selections.

Weekly awards
| Player | Award | Date awarded | Ref. |
|---|---|---|---|
| Josaiah Stewart | Co-Big Ten Defensive Player of the Week | October 2, 2023 | |
| J. J. McCarthy | Big Ten Offensive Player of the Week | October 16, 2023 | |
| J. J. McCarthy | Big Ten Offensive Player of the Week | October 23, 2023 | |
| Mike Sainristil | Big Ten Defensive Player of the Week | November 20, 2023 | |
| James Turner | Big Ten Special Teams Player of the Week | November 27, 2023 | |

Individual awards
| Player | Award | Ref. |
|---|---|---|
| Blake Corum | Ameche–Dayne Running Back of the Year | |
| J. J. McCarthy | Griese–Brees Quarterback of the Year | |
| Junior Colson | Lott IMPACT Trophy | |

All-Big Ten
| Player | Position | Coaches | Media |
|---|---|---|---|
| Blake Corum | RB | 1 | 1 |
| Will Johnson | DB | 1 | 1 |
| J. J. McCarthy | QB | 1 | 1 |
| Drake Nugent | OL | 1 | 1 |
| Zak Zinter | OL | 1 | 1 |
| LaDarius Henderson | OL | 1 | 2 |
| Colston Loveland | TE | 1 | 2 |
| Mason Graham | DL | 1 | 3 |
| Mike Sainristil | DB | 2 | 1 |
| Junior Colson | LB | 2 | 2 |
| Kris Jenkins Jr. | DL | 2 | 2 |
| Trevor Keegan | OL | 2 | 2 |
| Roman Wilson | WR | 2 | 2 |
| Karsen Barnhart | OL | 2 | 3 |
| Kenneth Grant | DL | 2 | 3 |
| James Turner | K | 2 | Hon. |
| Michael Barrett | LB | 3 | Hon. |
| Tommy Doman | P | 3 | Hon. |
| Rod Moore | DB | 3 | Hon. |
| AJ Barner | TE | Hon. | Hon. |
| Jaylen Harrell | DL | Hon. | Hon. |
| Braiden McGregor | DL | Hon. | Hon. |
| Derrick Moore | DL | Hon. | Hon. |
| Semaj Morgan | KR | Hon. | Hon. |
| Josh Wallace | DB | Hon. | Hon. |
| Makari Paige | DB | Hon. | – |
| Josaiah Stewart | DL | Hon. | – |
| Cornelius Johnson | WR | – | Hon. |
Hon. = Honorable mention. Reference:

== Statistics ==
=== Offensive statistics ===
Rushing
| Player | GP | Att | Net Yards | Yds/Att | TD | Long |
|---|---|---|---|---|---|---|
| Blake Corum | 15 | 258 | 1,245 | 4.8 | 27 | 59 |
| Donovan Edwards | 15 | 119 | 497 | 4.2 | 5 | 46 |
| Kalel Mullings | 13 | 36 | 222 | 6.2 | 1 | 23 |
| J. J. McCarthy | 15 | 64 | 202 | 3.2 | 3 | 22 |
| Alex Orji | 6 | 15 | 86 | 5.7 | 1 | 20 |

Passing
| Player | GP | Att | Comp | Comp % | Yds | TD | Int | Long |
|---|---|---|---|---|---|---|---|---|
| J. J. McCarthy | 15 | 332 | 240 | 72.3% | 2,991 | 22 | 4 | 54 |
| Jack Tuttle | 6 | 17 | 15 | 88.2% | 130 | 1 | 0 | 35 |
| Jayden Denegal | 6 | 5 | 4 | 80.0% | 50 | 1 | 0 | 35 |
| Donovan Edwards | 15 | 1 | 1 | 100.0% | 34 | 0 | 0 | 34 |
| Davis Warren | 5 | 5 | 0 | 0.0% | 0 | 0 | 1 | 0 |

Receiving
| Player | GP | Recp | Yds | Yds/Recp | Yds/GP | TD | Long |
|---|---|---|---|---|---|---|---|
| Roman Wilson | 15 | 48 | 789 | 16.4 | 52.6 | 12 | 47 |
| Colston Loveland | 15 | 45 | 649 | 14.4 | 43.3 | 4 | 54 |
| Cornelius Johnson | 15 | 47 | 604 | 12.9 | 40.3 | 1 | 50 |
| Donovan Edwards | 15 | 30 | 249 | 8.3 | 16.6 | 0 | 37 |
| AJ Barner | 15 | 22 | 249 | 11.3 | 16.6 | 1 | 22 |
| Semaj Morgan | 15 | 22 | 204 | 9.3 | 13.6 | 2 | 35 |
| Tyler Morris | 15 | 13 | 197 | 15.2 | 13.1 | 1 | 38 |
| Blake Corum | 15 | 16 | 117 | 7.3 | 7.8 | 1 | 27 |
| Darrius Clemons | 11 | 3 | 33 | 11.0 | 3.0 | 0 | 19 |
| Fredrick Moore | 13 | 4 | 32 | 8.0 | 2.5 | 0 | 10 |
| Kalel Mullings | 13 | 2 | 32 | 16.0 | 2.5 | 0 | 19 |
| Max Bredeson | 15 | 2 | 19 | 9.5 | 1.3 | 0 | 14 |

=== Defensive statistics ===
| Player | GP | Solo | Asst | Tot | TFL | Sack | Int | PBU | QBH |
|---|---|---|---|---|---|---|---|---|---|
| Junior Colson | 15 | 44 | 51 | 95.0 | 2.0 | 0 | 0 | 2 | 2 |
| Michael Barrett | 15 | 39 | 26 | 65.0 | 3.5 | 3 | 0 | 2 | 5 |
| Ernest Hausmann | 15 | 16 | 30 | 46.0 | 2.0 | 0 | 0 | 0 | 0 |
| Mike Sainristil | 15 | 26 | 18 | 44.0 | 4.0 | 1.0 | 6 | 6 | 3 |
| Makari Paige | 14 | 17 | 24 | 41.0 | 0.0 | 0 | 0 | 2 | 1 |
| Josaiah Stewart | 15 | 23 | 15 | 38.0 | 8.5 | 5.5 | 0 | 2 | 3 |
| Rod Moore | 12 | 21 | 17 | 38.0 | 1.0 | 0 | 2 | 3 | 0 |
| Kris Jenkins Jr. | 15 | 17 | 20 | 37.0 | 4.5 | 2.5 | 1 | 0 | 3 |
| Mason Graham | 13 | 23 | 13 | 36.0 | 7.5 | 3.0 | 0 | 1 | 3 |
| Derrick Moore | 15 | 20 | 14 | 34.0 | 6.0 | 5.0 | 0 | 2 | 4 |
| Josh Wallace | 15 | 22 | 11 | 33.0 | 2.0 | 0 | 0 | 4 | 0 |
| Jaylen Harrell | 15 | 15 | 16 | 31.0 | 9.0 | 6.5 | 0 | 1 | 5 |
| Kenneth Grant | 15 | 16 | 13 | 29.0 | 5.0 | 3.5 | 1 | 5 | 6 |
| Keon Sabb | 14 | 14 | 14 | 28.0 | 0.5 | 0.5 | 2 | 5 | 0 |
| Will Johnson | 12 | 20 | 7 | 27.0 | 1.0 | 0 | 4 | 4 | 0 |
| Rayshaun Benny | 14 | 13 | 14 | 27.0 | 5.5 | 1.0 | 0 | 2 | 0 |
| Braiden McGregor | 15 | 13 | 13 | 26.0 | 9.0 | 4.5 | 0 | 3 | 7 |
| Cam Goode | 15 | 12 | 13 | 25.0 | 3.5 | 2.0 | 0 | 0 | 1 |
| Quinten Johnson | 15 | 18 | 4 | 22.0 | 0.0 | 0 | 1 | 4 | 0 |

=== Special teams statistics ===
Kickoff returns
| Player | Returns | Yds | Yds/Rtrn | TD | Long |
|---|---|---|---|---|---|
| Semaj Morgan | 12 | 186 | 15.5 | 0 | 28 |

Punt returns
| Player | Returns | Yds | Yds/Rtrn | TD | Long |
|---|---|---|---|---|---|
| Jake Thaw | 16 | 101 | 6.3 | 0 | 32 |
| Semaj Morgan | 3 | 101 | 33.7 | 0 | 87 |
| Tyler Morris | 9 | 88 | 9.8 | 0 | 30 |

Punts
| Player | Punts | Yds | Yds/Punt | Long | 50+ | Inside 20 | T'back |
|---|---|---|---|---|---|---|---|
| Tommy Doman | 53 | 2,346 | 44.3 | 71 | 12 | 18 | 4 |

Field goals
| Player | FGs | Att | Long | Blocked |
|---|---|---|---|---|
| James Turner | 18 | 21 | 50 | 0 |

== 2024 NFL draft ==
Michigan had 13 players selected in the 2024 NFL draft, the most selections in the draft, and setting a program record.

| Round | Pick | Player | Position | NFL team |
|---|---|---|---|---|
| 1 | 10 | J. J. McCarthy | QB | Minnesota Vikings |
| 2 | 49 | Kris Jenkins Jr. | DT | Cincinnati Bengals |
| 2 | 50 | Mike Sainristil | CB | Washington Commanders |
| 3 | 69 | Junior Colson | LB | Los Angeles Chargers |
| 3 | 83 | Blake Corum | RB | Los Angeles Rams |
| 3 | 84 | Roman Wilson | WR | Pittsburgh Steelers |
| 3 | 85 | Zak Zinter | OG | Cleveland Browns |
| 4 | 121 | AJ Barner | TE | Seattle Seahawks |
| 5 | 172 | Trevor Keegan | OG | Philadelphia Eagles |
| 7 | 240 | Michael Barrett | LB | Carolina Panthers |
| 7 | 249 | LaDarius Henderson | OT | Houston Texans |
| 7 | 252 | Jaylen Harrell | DE | Tennessee Titans |
| 7 | 253 | Cornelius Johnson | WR | Los Angeles Chargers |
