= Tommy Doman =

American football player (born 2002)

Tommy Doman Jr.
No. 39 – Buffalo Bills
- Position: Punter
- Roster status: Active

Personal information
- Born: September 1, 2002 (age 24); Rochester Hills, Michigan, U.S.
- Listed height: 6 ft 4 in (1.93 m)
- Listed weight: 214 lb (97 kg)

Career information
- High school: St. Mary's Preparatory (Orchard Lake, Michigan)
- College: Michigan (2021–2024); Florida (2025)
- NFL draft: 2026: 7th round, 239th overall pick

Career history
- Buffalo Bills (2026–present)

Awards and highlights
- CFP national champion (2023); Third-team All-Big Ten (2023)

Career NFL statistics as of Week 11, 2026
- Punts: 22
- Punting yards: 1,046
- Punting average: 47.5
- Longest punt: 63
- Inside 20: 9
- Touchbacks: 3
- Stats at Pro Football Reference

Thomas Doman Jr. (born September 1, 2002) is American professional football punter and kickoff specialist for the Buffalo Bills of the National Football League (NFL). He played college football for the Michigan Wolverines and Florida Gators, winning a national championship with the Wolverines in 2023. Doman was selected by the Bills in the seventh round of the 2026 NFL draft.

== Early life ==
Doman was born on September 1, 2002, in Rochester Hills, Michigan, the son of a colonel in the United States Marine Corps. He grew up playing football, and the first field goal he ever made in a game was on his first attempt, on a 32-yard try while he was in fifth grade. Doman attended St. Mary's Preparatory in Orchard Lake Village where he served as the football team's placekicker and punter. He was twice selected All-Catholic League and two times earned first-team All-North and All-State honors from The Detroit News. As a senior, he averaged 44.8 yards per punt and made six of seven field goal attempts, including a successful attempt from 53 yards that set the school record. Doman was selected an Under Armour All-American and was invited to the All-American Bowl. Ranked the number two punter prospect nationally as well as a top kicker, he committed to play college football for the Michigan Wolverines.

== College career ==
As a true freshman at Michigan in 2021, Doman redshirted. He saw limited playing time in four games in 2022, recording one punt, two extra points while also being used as a kickoff specialist. He served as the starting punter and kickoff specialist for Michigan in 2023, punting 53 times for an average of 44.3 yards per kick with a long of 71 yards. He earned third-team All-Big Ten Conference honors and won the FBS national championship with the Wolverines. He also kicked off 99 times and had 68 touchbacks. In 2024, Doman averaged 42.6 yards on 49 punts while kicking off 59 times with 37 touchbacks. He transferred to the Florida Gators for his final season of college football in 2025. Doman played in every game for the Gators in 2025 and punted 50 times with an average of 44.0 yards per punt, earning All-Southeastern Conference (SEC) honors from Pro Football Focus.

== Professional career ==
Pre-draft measurables
Height	Weight	Arm length	Hand span	Wingspan
6 ft 4 3/8 in (1.94 m)	214 lb (97 kg)	31 in (0.79 m)	9 5/8 in (0.24 m)	6 ft 3 1/8 in (1.91 m)
All values from NFL Combine

Doman was selected by the Buffalo Bills in the seventh round (239th overall) of the 2026 NFL draft. On August 29, he was named the starting punter. In Week 9 against the Minnesota Vikings, the Bills turned to Doman for kickoff duties rather than the incumbent Tyler Bass. On the second kickoff of the game, Doman delivered a hit on Vikings returner Myles Price that resulted in forced fumble, though Minnesota recovered the ball. Doman achieved his first pass completion on a fake punt during the Bills' Week 11 game against the Miami Dolphins.
