= Quinten Johnson =

American football player (born 2000)

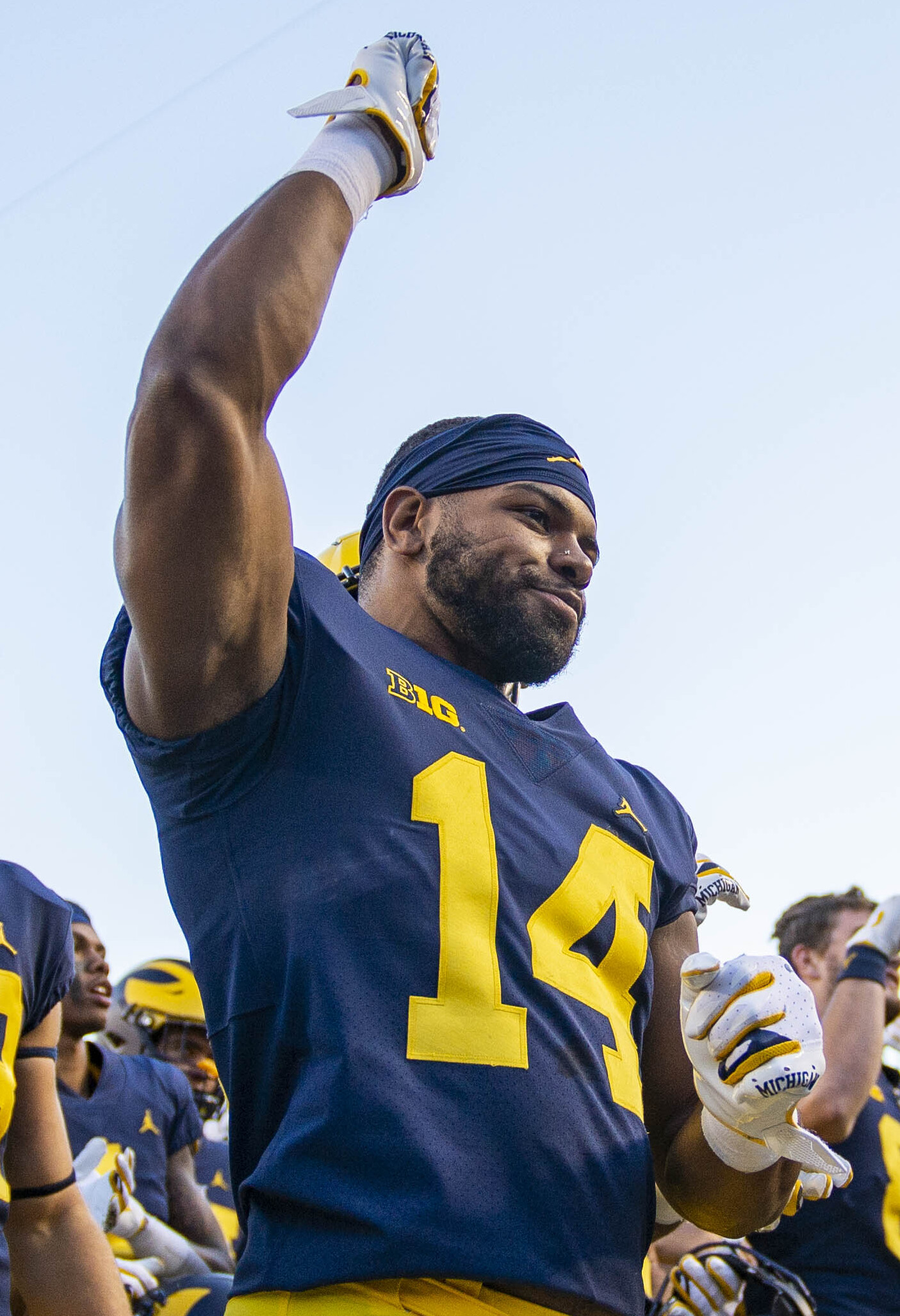
- Johnson with the Michigan Wolverines in 2021

No. 28, 14, 23
- Position: Defensive back

Personal information
- Born: June 10, 2000 (age 26)
- Listed height: 5 ft 10 in (1.78 m)
- Listed weight: 202 lb (92 kg)

Career information
- High school: St. John's (Washington, D.C.)
- College: Michigan (2019–2024)

Awards and highlights
- CFP national champion (2023)
- Stats at ESPN

Quinten Johnson (born June 10, 2000) is an American football safety. He played college football for the Michigan Wolverines, winning three consecutive Big Ten Conference titles and a national championship in 2023.

== Early life ==
Johnson was born on June 10, 2000, the son of John and Karen Johnson, and attended St. John's College High School in Washington D.C. He was rated as a four-star recruit, the No. 16 ranked safety, and the No. 182 overall ranked player in the country in 2019. Johnson committed to play college football at the University of Michigan over offers from schools such as Penn State, Alabama, Boston College, and Maryland.

== College career ==
In his first two seasons, 2019 and 2020, Johnson redshirted after playing in only two games. In his third and fourth seasons, 2021 and 2022, he appeared in all 28 games on defense and special teams, registering 14 tackles.

In 2023, Johnson appeared in all 15 games for Michigan’s national championship team. He finished the season with a career-best 22 tackles, five pass deflections, an interception, and a critical forced fumble in the Rose Bowl on Alabama quarterback Jalen Milroe.

After the season, Johnson declared for the 2024 NFL draft. He later decided to return to play for the Wolverines in 2024, after being granted a sixth season of eligibility. In total, Johnson played in all 13 games and started 12 times. He finished his final season with 43 tackles, one tackle for a loss and had five passes defended. In his six years, Johnson won 59 games with the Wolverines, appeared in 58 games (35 on defense), won three Big Ten championships and was a national champion in 2023.

== Professional career ==
Pre-draft measurables
Height	Weight	Arm length	Hand span	40-yard dash	10-yard split	20-yard split
5 ft 9 7/8 in (1.77 m)	202 lb (92 kg)	30 3/4 in (0.78 m)	9 3/4 in (0.25 m)	4.69 s	1.62 s	2.64 s
All values from Pro Day

After going unselected in the 2025 NFL draft, Johnson was invited to tryout for the Atlanta Falcons in May 2025.
