= Steve Clinkscale =

American football player and coach (born 1977)

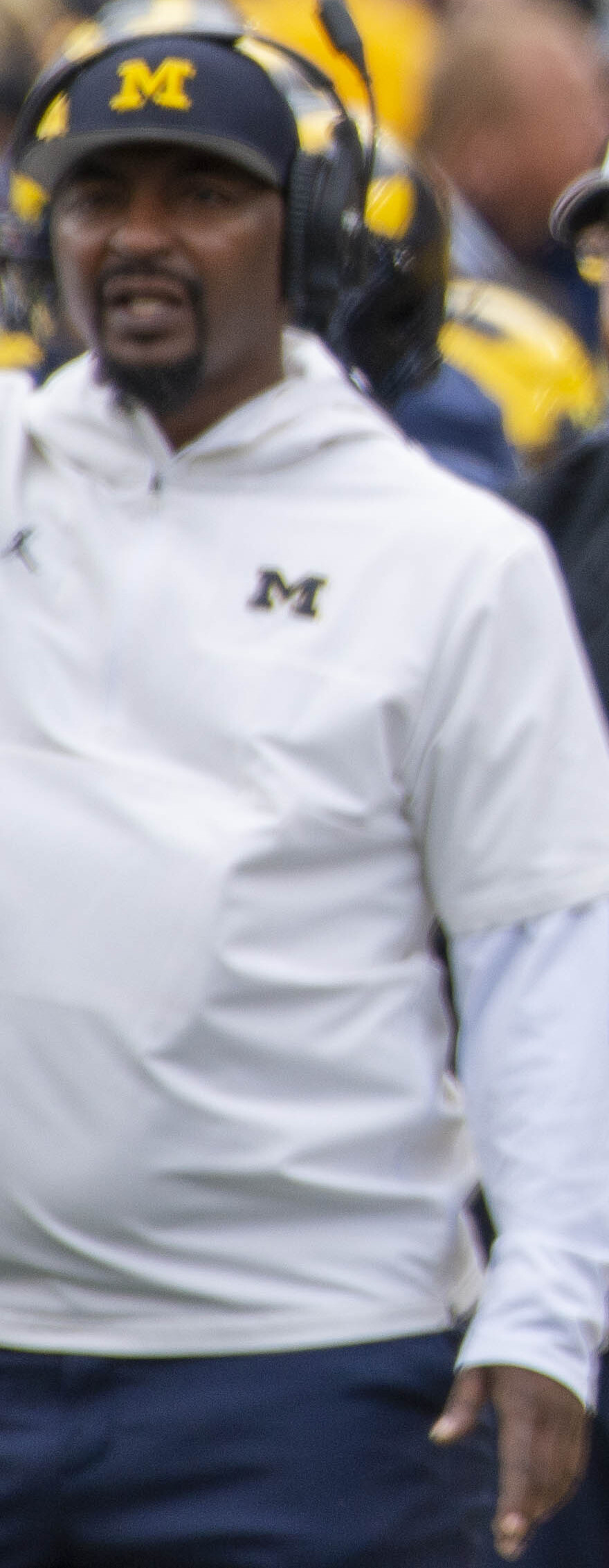
- Clinkscale with Michigan in 2021

Los Angeles Chargers
- Title: Passing game coordinator & defensive backs coach

Personal information
- Born: September 21, 1977 (age 49); Youngstown, Ohio, U.S.

Career information
- College: Ashland

Career history
- Ashland (2001–2006) Defensive backs coach; Ashland (2007) Linebackers coach; Western Carolina (2008) Defensive backs coach; Toledo (2009–2011) Cornerbacks coach & special teams coordinator; Illinois (2012) Cornerbacks coach; Cincinnati (2013–2014) Defensive backs coach; Cincinnati (2015) Defensive coordinator & defensive backs coach; Kentucky (2016–2020) Secondary coach; Michigan (2021) Defensive backs coach; Michigan (2022–2023) Co-defensive coordinator & defensive backs coach; Los Angeles Chargers (2024–2025) Defensive backs coach; Los Angeles Chargers (2026–present) Passing game coordinator & defensive backs coach

Awards and highlights
- CFP national champion (2023)

Steve Clinkscale (born September 21, 1977) is an American football coach who is currently the defensive backs coach for the Los Angeles Chargers of the National Football League (NFL). He was previously the defensive backs coach for the University of Michigan and the University of Kentucky.

== Early life ==
Clinkscale was born in 1977. He grew up in Youngstown, Ohio, and attended Chaney High School. He attended Ashland University where he played football and was the team captain. He graduated in 2000 with a degree in sports science.

== Coaching career ==
Clinkscale began his coaching career as the defensive backs coach at Ashland from 2001 to 2007. He then held the same position at Western Carolina in 2008. From 2009 to 2011, he was the cornerbacks coach and special teams coordinator at Toledo. He next coached defensive backs at Cincinnati from 2013 to 2015. In January 2015, he was elevated to the defensive coordinator position at Cincinnati.

Clinkscale was hired in March 2016 as the defensive backs coach for the University of Kentucky Wildcats football team. He held that position from 2016 to 2020. Kentucky's defensive backs under Clinkscale led the SEC in passing defense in 2019 and 2020.

Clinkscale was hired in May 2021 as Michigan's defensive backs coach. He was hired at an initial annual salary of $600,000. He also became co-defensive coordinator in 2022. He helped lead the Wolverines to a national championship in 2023.

On February 14, 2024, Clinkscale was named as the defensive backs coach for the Los Angeles Chargers. On May 22, 2026, Clinkscale added the role of defensive passing game coordinator to his title.
