= Drake Nugent =

American football player (born 2001)

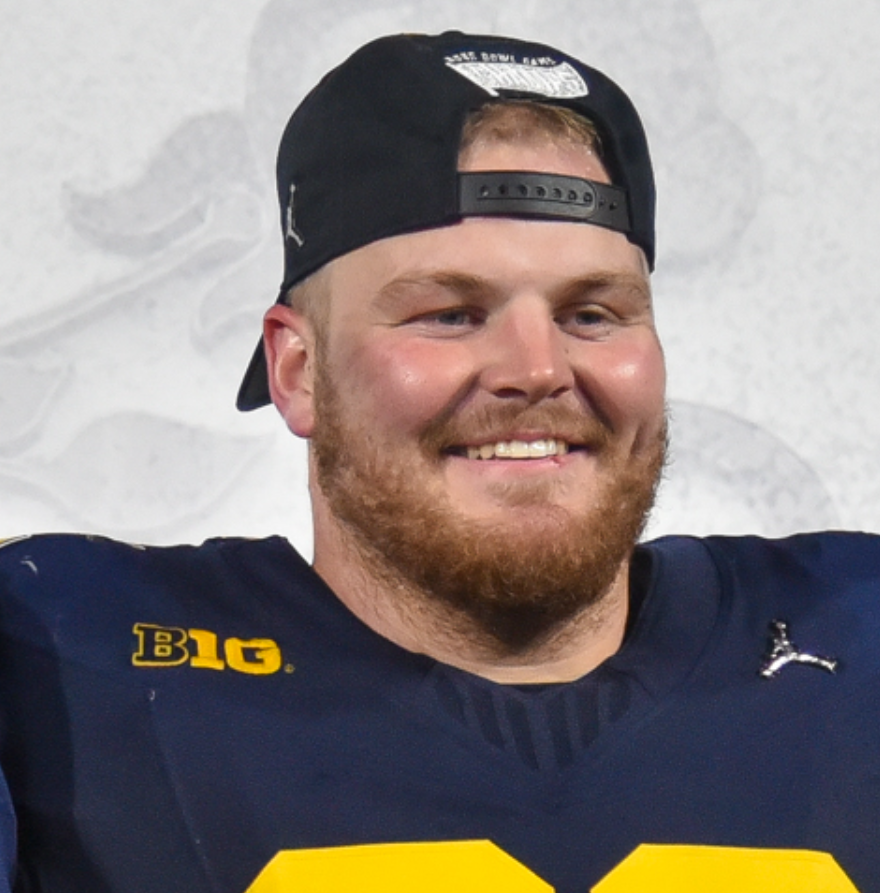
- Nugent at 2024 Rose Bowl

No. 66 – San Francisco 49ers
- Position: Center
- Roster status: Practice squad

Personal information
- Born: February 9, 2001 (age 25); Denver, Colorado, U.S.
- Listed height: 6 ft 1 in (1.85 m)
- Listed weight: 300 lb (136 kg)

Career information
- High school: Highlands Ranch (Colorado)
- College: Stanford (2019–2022); Michigan (2023)
- NFL draft: 2024: undrafted

Career history
- San Francisco 49ers (2024–present)

Awards and highlights
- CFP national champion (2023); First-team All-Big Ten (2023)
- Stats at Pro Football Reference

Drake Johnathon Nugent (born February 9, 2001) is an American professional football center for the San Francisco 49ers of the National Football League (NFL). He played college football for the Stanford Cardinal and Michigan Wolverines. Nugent was a first-team All-Big Ten selection, winning a national championship with Michigan in 2023.

== Early life ==
Nugent grew up in Lone Tree, Colorado, and attended Highlands Ranch High School. He played high school football on both offense and defense and was selected as an All-Colorado player in 2017 and 2018.

== College career ==
=== Stanford ===
Nugent played college football for Stanford from 2019 to 2022. He started 24 consecutive games at center for the 2021 and 2022 Stanford Cardinal football teams. He was also selected twice as a Pac-12 Academic Honor Roll player in 2021 and 2022.

=== Michigan ===
In December 2022, Nugent entered the NCAA transfer portal and accepted an offer from the University of Michigan.

In 2023, following his transfer, Nugent started all 15 games at center for Michigan’s national championship team. Nugent was voted First-team All-Big Ten and was a Rimington Trophy finalist.

== Professional career ==
Pre-draft measurables
Height	Weight	Arm length	Hand span	Wingspan	40-yard dash	10-yard split	20-yard split	20-yard shuttle	Three-cone drill	Vertical jump	Broad jump	Bench press
6 ft 1 1/2 in (1.87 m)	298 lb (135 kg)	33 in (0.84 m)	9 in (0.23 m)	6 ft 6 1/4 in (1.99 m)	5.23 s	1.83 s	3.05 s	4.50 s	7.33 s	29.5 in (0.75 m)	8 ft 5 in (2.57 m)	25 reps
All values from NFL Combine

On April 27, 2024, Nugent signed with the San Francisco 49ers as an undrafted free agent. He was waived on August 27, and re-signed to the practice squad. He signed a reserve/future contract on January 6, 2025.

On August 26, 2025, Nugent was waived by the 49ers as part of final roster cuts; he was re-signed to the team's practice squad the next day. On January 20, 2026, he signed a reserve/futures contract with San Francisco.

On August 30, 2026, Nugent was waived by the 49ers as a part of final roster cuts and re-signed to the practice squad the next day.
