= Evan Link =

American football player (born 2004)

No. 71 – Michigan Wolverines
- Position: Offensive tackle
- Class: Senior

Personal information
- Born: December 21, 2004 (age 21)
- Listed height: 6 ft 6 in (1.98 m)
- Listed weight: 313 lb (142 kg)

Career information
- High school: Gonzaga College (Washington, D.C.)
- College: Michigan (2023–present)

Awards and highlights
- CFP national champion (2023)
- Stats at ESPN

Evan Link (born December 21, 2004) is an American college football offensive tackle for the Michigan Wolverines. As a freshman, he won a national championship in 2023.

== Early life ==
Link attended high school at Gonzaga College located in Washington, D.C. Coming out of high school, he was rated as a four star recruit, the 27th overall offensive tackle, the 3rd overall player from the District of Columbia, and the 294th overall player in the class of 2023, where he held offers from schools such as Florida State, Miami, Tennessee, and Wisconsin, but ultimately, committed to play college football for the Michigan Wolverines over his other finalists, Penn State and Stanford.

== College career ==
As a freshman in 2023, Link was redshirted as Michigan won the national championship. In 2024, he appeared in 13 games, making 11 starts at right tackle. Link will compete for a starting job on the Wolverines offensive line in 2025.
