= 2023 Washington Huskies football team =

American college football season

2023 Washington Huskies football

Pac-12 champion Sugar Bowl champion

Pac-12 Championship Game, W 34–31 vs. Oregon

Sugar Bowl (CFP Semifinal), W 37–31 vs. Texas CFP National Championship, L 13–34 vs. Michigan
- Conference: Pac-12 Conference

Ranking
- Coaches: No. 2
- AP: No. 2
- Record: 14–1 (9–0 Pac-12)
- Head coach: Kalen DeBoer (2nd season)
- Offensive coordinator: Ryan Grubb (2nd season)
- Offensive scheme: Spread
- Co-defensive coordinators: William Inge (2nd season); Chuck Morrell (2nd season)
- Base defense: 4–2–5
- Home stadium: Husky Stadium

2023 Pac-12 Conference football standings
	Conf.			Overall
Team	W		L	W		L
No. 2 Washington y$^	9	–	0	14	–	1
No. 6 Oregon y	8	–	1	12	–	2
No. 11 Arizona	7	–	2	10	–	3
Oregon State	5	–	4	8	–	5
Utah	5	–	4	8	–	5
USC	5	–	4	8	–	5
California	4	–	5	6	–	7
UCLA	4	–	5	8	–	5
Washington State	2	–	7	5	–	7
Stanford	2	–	7	3	–	9
Arizona State*	2	–	7	3	–	9
Colorado	1	–	8	4	–	8
Championship: Washington 34, Oregon 31
^ – College Football Playoff participant; $ – Conference champion; y – Championship game participant; * – Ineligible for postseason play due to self-imposed ban for 2020 recruiting violations; Rankings from AP Poll

The 2023 Washington Huskies football team represented the University of Washington as a member of the Pac-12 Conference during the 2023 NCAA Division I FBS football season. The Huskies were led by Kalen DeBoer in his second and final season as Washington's head coach, before leaving for Alabama at the end of the season. They played their home games at Husky Stadium in Seattle. 2023 was Washington's final season in the Pac-12 Conference before moving to the Big Ten Conference in 2024.

With their win over Washington State, the Huskies became the first team to go undefeated in Pac-12 play since the league expanded to 12 teams in 2011. It was Washington's 13th undefeated regular season and 8th perfect regular season, their first since 1991.

After beating the Oregon Ducks on December 1, 2023, in the Pac-12 Championship Game, Washington also set a program record for wins during a season, their thirteen wins beating the previous record of twelve originally set by their undefeated 1991 national championship team and tied by the 2016 team. Washington was ranked No. 2 in the final College Football Playoff rankings, and played against Texas in the 2024 Sugar Bowl. They won that game, 37–31, becoming the second Pac-12 team to win a College Football Playoff game, and advanced to the 2024 CFP National Championship game against No. 1 Michigan, where they lost 34–13.

== Preseason ==
=== Transfers ===
2023 transfers
Name	Num	Pos.	Height	Weight	Year	Hometown	Transferred from
Jabbar Muhammad	1	CB	5'10"	185	Junior	DeSoto, TX	Oklahoma State
Germie Bernard	4	WR	6'0"	200	Sophomore	Henderson, NV	Michigan State
Dillon Johnson	7	RB	6'0"	215	Senior	Greenville, MS	Mississippi State
Thaddeus Dixon	9	WR	6'2"	205	Sophomore	La Mirada, CA	Long Beach City College
Ralen Goforth	10	OLB	6'2"	225	Graduate student	Long Beach, CA	USC
Zach Durfee	15	DL	6'5"	250	(redshirt) Sophomore	Dawson, MN	Sioux Falls
Daniyel Ngata	21	RB	5'10"	200	(redshirt) Junior	Tempe, AZ	Arizona State
Josh Cuevas	85	TE	6'5"	245	(redshirt) Sophomore	Los Angeles, CA	Cal Poly
Name	Num	Pos.	Height	Weight	Year	Hometown	Transferred to
Lonyatta Alexander Jr.	4	WR	6'1"	200	(redshirt) Freshman	Auburn, WA	Montana State
Cameron Williams	6	S	6'0"	207	Junior	Bakersfield, CA	Georgia Southern
Sam Huard	7	QB	6'2"	193	Freshman	Bellevue, WA	Cal Poly
Zakhari Spears	14	CB	6'1"	195	Freshman	Los Angeles, CA	UConn
Daniel Heimuli	15	LB	6'0"	225	Sophomore	Palo Alto, CA	Arizona
Jay'Veon Sunday	26	RB	6'0"	203	(redshirt) Freshman	Waco, TX	Abilene Christian
Victor Curne	79	OL	6'4"	320	Junior	Houston, TX	Ole Miss

=== Recruiting ===
The Huskies signed a total of 19 recruits.

College recruiting (2023)
Name	Hometown	School	Height	Weight	Commit date
Vincent Holmes #13 S	San Jacinto, CA	San Jacinto High School	6 ft 1 in (1.85 m)	180 lb (82 kg)	Jun 25, 2022
Vincent Holmes #13 S	Recruit ratings: Rivals: 247Sports: ESPN:				
Caleb Presley #29 CB	Seattle, WA	Rainier Beach High School	6 ft 0 in (1.83 m)	180 lb (82 kg)	Dec 21, 2022
Caleb Presley #29 CB	Recruit ratings: Rivals: 247Sports: ESPN:				
Rashid Williams #15 ATH	Pittsburg, CA	Pittsburg High School	6 ft 1 in (1.85 m)	175 lb (79 kg)	May 19, 2022
Rashid Williams #15 ATH	Recruit ratings: Rivals: 247Sports: ESPN:				
Curley Reed #19 S	Lake Charles, LA	Lake Charles College Prep	6 ft 1 in (1.85 m)	180 lb (82 kg)	Jul 14, 2022
Curley Reed #19 S	Recruit ratings: Rivals: 247Sports: ESPN:				
Landen Hatchett #2 OC	Ferndale, WA	Ferndale High School	6 ft 3 in (1.91 m)	280 lb (130 kg)	Jun 29, 2022
Landen Hatchett #2 OC	Recruit ratings: Rivals: 247Sports: ESPN:				
Elishah Jackett #30 OT	Orange, CA	El Modena High School	6 ft 7 in (2.01 m)	260 lb (120 kg)	Jun 26, 2022
Elishah Jackett #30 OT	Recruit ratings: Rivals: 247Sports: ESPN:				
Taeshaun Lyons #43 WR	Hayward, CA	Tennyson High School	6 ft 2 in (1.88 m)	170 lb (77 kg)	Dec 16, 2022
Taeshaun Lyons #43 WR	Recruit ratings: Rivals: 247Sports: ESPN:				
Tybo Rogers #37 RB	Bakersfield, CA	Bakersfield High School	5 ft 11 in (1.80 m)	180 lb (82 kg)	Mar 7, 2022
Tybo Rogers #37 RB	Recruit ratings: Rivals: 247Sports: ESPN:				
Anthony James #59 DE	Wylie, TX	Wylie East High School	6 ft 5 in (1.96 m)	240 lb (110 kg)	Jun 24, 2022
Anthony James #59 DE	Recruit ratings: Rivals: 247Sports: ESPN:				
Keith Reynolds #115 WR	Victorville, CA	Adelanto High School	5 ft 10 in (1.78 m)	170 lb (77 kg)	Apr 4, 2022
Keith Reynolds #115 WR	Recruit ratings: Rivals: 247Sports: ESPN:				
Jordan Whitney #66 OLB	Oxnard, CA	Pacifica High School	6 ft 1 in (1.85 m)	205 lb (93 kg)	Jun 25, 2022
Jordan Whitney #66 OLB	Recruit ratings: Rivals: 247Sports: ESPN:				
Leroy Bryant #91 CB	Fairfield, CA	Rodriguez High School	5 ft 11 in (1.80 m)	175 lb (79 kg)	Jul 1, 2022
Leroy Bryant #91 CB	Recruit ratings: Rivals: 247Sports: ESPN:				
Kahlee Tafai #99 OT	Lawndale, CA	Leuzinger High School	6 ft 5 in (1.96 m)	300 lb (140 kg)	Jul 28, 2022
Kahlee Tafai #99 OT	Recruit ratings: Rivals: 247Sports: ESPN:				
Zachary Henning #105 OT	Aurora, CO	Grandview High School	6 ft 5 in (1.96 m)	275 lb (125 kg)	Jun 24, 2022
Zachary Henning #105 OT	Recruit ratings: Rivals: 247Sports: ESPN:				
Jacob Lane #144 DE	South Hill, WA	Emerald Ridge High School	6 ft 4 in (1.93 m)	230 lb (100 kg)	Jun 20, 2022
Jacob Lane #144 DE	Recruit ratings: Rivals: 247Sports: ESPN:				
Elinneus Davis #90 DT	Moorhead, MN	Moorhead High School	6 ft 3 in (1.91 m)	290 lb (130 kg)	Jul 12, 2022
Elinneus Davis #90 DT	Recruit ratings: Rivals: 247Sports: ESPN:				
Deven Bryant #55 ILB	Bellflower, CA	St. John Bosco High School	6 ft 1 in (1.85 m)	215 lb (98 kg)	May 8, 2022
Deven Bryant #55 ILB	Recruit ratings: Rivals: 247Sports: ESPN:				
Soane Faasolo #127 OT	Atherton, CA	Menlo High School	6 ft 8 in (2.03 m)	260 lb (120 kg)	Jun 30, 2022
Soane Faasolo #127 OT	Recruit ratings: Rivals: 247Sports: ESPN:				
Overall recruit ranking: Rivals: 14 247Sports: 9
Note: In many cases, Scout, Rivals, 247Sports, On3, and ESPN may conflict in their listings of height and weight.; In these cases, the average was taken. ESPN grades are on a 100-point scale.; Sources: "Washington Football Commitments". Rivals.; "2023 Washington Football Commits". Scout.; "Scout.com Team Recruiting Rankings". Scout.; "2023 Team Ranking". Rivals.com.

== Roster ==
2023 Washington Huskies football team roster
Players
Coaches
Offense

Pos.	#	Name	Class
WR	0	Giles Jackson	Sr
WR	1	Rome Odunze	Sr
WR	2	Ja'Lynn Polk	So
WR	3	Rashid Williams	Fr
WR	4	Germie Bernard	So
QB	5	Dylan Morris	Jr
RB	6	Richard Newton	Sr
RB	7	Dillon Johnson	Sr
WR/RB	8	Will Nixon	So
QB	9	Michael Penix Jr.	Sr
QB	10	Austin Mack	Fr
WR	11	Jalen McMillan	Sr
WR	12	Denzel Boston	Fr
QB	13	Camdyn Stiegeler	Fr
QB	14	William Haskell	So
WR	15	Taeshaun Lyons	Fr
QB	17	Teddy Purcell	So
RB	18	Camden Sirmon	So
QB	19	Alex Johnson	Jr
RB	20	Tybo Rogers	Fr
RB	21	Daniyel Ngata	Jr
RB	22	Cameron Davis	Jr
RB	25	Ryder Bumgarner	Fr
RB	28	Sam Adams II	So
WR	31	Luke Luchini	Fr
TE	37	Jack Westover	Sr
OL	54	Parker Cross	Fr
OL	55	Troy Fautanu	Jr
OL	56	Geirean Hatchett	So
OL	58	Zachary Henning	Fr
OL	63	Roice Cleeland	Fr
OL	64	Gaard Memmelaar	So
OL	65	Samuel Peacock	So
OL	66	Landen Hatchett	Fr
OL	67	Aidan Anderson	Fr
OL	68	Soane Faasalo	Fr
OL	70	Jalen Klemm	Fr
OL	71	Nate Kalepo	Jr
OL	72	Parker Brailsford	Fr
OL	73	Roger Rosengarten	So
OL	74	Kahlee Tafai	Fr
OL	75	Robert Wyrsch	So
OL	76	Elishah Jackett	Fr
OL	77	Julius Buelow	Jr
OL	78	Matteo Mele	Sr
WR	80	Jake Parnagian	Fr
WR	81	Mason Wheeler	Jr
WR	82	Owen Coutts	So
TE	83	Devin Culp	Sr
WR	84	Jackson Girouard	So
TE	85	Josh Cuevas	So
TE	86	Griffin Waiss	So
TE	87	Ryan Otton	Fr
TE	88	Quentin Moore	Jr
WR	89	Keith Reynolds	Fr
TE	91	John Frazier	So

Defense

Pos.	#	Name	Class
CB	0	Jaivion Green	So
CB	1	Jabbar Muhammad	Jr
CB	2	Caleb Presley	Fr
CB	3	Mishael Powell	Jr
DE	4	Zion Tupuola-Fetui	Sr
LB	5	Edefuan Ulofoshio	Sr
CB	6	Davon Banks	So
S	7	Dominique Hampton	Sr
DE	8	Bralen Trice	Jr
CB	9	Thaddeus Dixon	Jr
LB	10	Ralen Goforth	GS
LB	11	Alphonzo Tuputala	Jr
S	12	Tristan Dunn	Fr
OLB	13	Kamren Fabiculanan	So
DE	14	Milton Hopkins Jr.	So
DE	15	Zach Durfee	So
CB	16	Curley Reed	Fr
LB	17	Deven Bryant	Fr
S	18	Vincent Holmes	Fr
S	19	Darren Barkins	So
S	20	Asa Turner	Sr
LB	21	Dyson McCutcheon	So
CB	23	Leroy Bryant	Fr
S	24	Makell Esteen	So
CB	25	Elijah Jackson	So
S	26	Diesel Gordon	Fr
CB	27	Jakson Berman	Fr
S	28	Vincent Nunley	So
S	30	Sean Toomey-Stout	Jr
S	32	Tristan Warner	Fr
LB	33	Jordan Whitney	Fr
CB	34	Antonio Hill	Sr
CB	40	Anay Nagarajan	So
DE	41	Lance Holtzclaw	Fr
LB	42	Carson Bruener	Jr
LB	44	Austin Harnetiaux	Fr
DE	45	Maurice Heims	So
DE	46	Sekai Asoau-Afoa	Sr
DE	47	Anthony James	Fr
DE	48	Jacob Lane	Fr
LB	49	Griffin Miller	Fr
LB	51	Braydon Bruener	Fr
DE	52	Voi Tunuufi	Jr
LB	53	Logan Lisherness	Fr
LB	54	Drew Fowler	Jr
DL	55	Jacob Bandes	Jr
DE	56	Jacob Mason	Fr
DL	68	Ulumoo Ale	Sr
DE	88	Jake Jennings	So
DL	90	Elinneus Davis	Fr
DL	91	Tuli Letuligasenoa	Sr
DL	93	Habib Bello	Fr
DL	94	Jayvon Parker	So
DL	95	Armon Parker	Fr
DL	97	Bradley McGannon	So
DL	99	Faatui Tuitele	Jr

Special teams

Pos.	#	Name	Class
P	38	Jack McCallister	So
P	43	Adam Saul	So
LS	49	Alex Froelich	So
LS	82	Caleb Johnston	Fr
K	85	Addison Shrock	So
LS	89	Jaden Green	Jr
K	95	Grady Gross	So
P	96	Troy Petz	Fr

Head coach

- Kalen DeBoer

Coordinators/assistant coaches

- Ryan Grubb – Offensive coordinator/quarterbacks
- William Inge – Assistant head coach/co-defensive coordinator/linebackers
- Chuck Morrell – Co-defensive coordinator/safeties
- Eric Schmidt – Special teams coordinator/Edges
- JaMarcus Shephard – Passing game coordinator/wide receivers
- Inoke Breckterfield – Defensive line
- Lee Marks – Assistant head coach/running backs
- Scott Huff – Offensive line
- Nick Sheridan – Tight ends
- Julius Brown – Cornerbacks
- Ron McKeefery – Director, strength and conditioning
- Zack Cook – Assistant, strength and conditioning
- Bryan Fink – Assistant, strength and conditioning
- A. J. Middleton – Assistant, strength and conditioning
- Mitch Dahlen – Quality control, offense
- Tyler Hughes – Quality control, offense
- Taylor Pope – Quality control, offense
- Nick Brautigam – Quality control, defense
- C. J. McGorisk – Quality control, defense
- Paul Creighton – Quality control, special teams
- Tyson Maeva – Graduate assistant
- Juan Rodriguez – Graduate assistant
- Shaq Vann – Graduate assistant
- Keaton Wilkerson – Graduate assistant

Legend

- (C) Team captain
- (S) Suspended
- (I) Ineligible
- Injured
- Redshirt

Roster
Last update: 11/4/23

=== Depth chart ===
Defense

FS
Asa Turner
Kamren Fabiculanan
Darren Barkins

MIKE	WILL	NICKEL
Mishael Powell	Edefuan Ulofoshio	Alphonzo Tuputala
Tristan Dunn	Ralen Goforth	Carson Bruener
Deven Bryant	Jordan Whitney	Drew Fowler

SS
Dominique Hampton
Makell Esteen
Dyson McCutcheon

CB
Jabbar Muhammad
Thaddeus Dixon
Davon Banks

DE	DT	DT	DE
Bralen Trice	Ulumoo Ale	Tuli Letuligasenoa	Zion Tupuola-Fetui
Sekai Asoau-Afoa	Faatui Tuitele	Jacob Bandes	Voi Tunuuf
Milton Hopkins Jr.	Armon Parker	Habib Bello	Zach Durfee

CB
Elijah Jackson
Jaivion Green
Leroy Bryant

Offense

WR
Rome Odunze
Germie Bernard
Taeshaun Lyons

WR
Jalen McMillan
Will Nixon
Rashad Williams

LT	LG	C	RG	RT
Troy Fautanu	Nate Kalepo	Parker Brailsford	Geirean Hatchett	Roger Rosengarten
Jalen Klemm	Zachary Henning	Landon Hatchett	Julius Buelow	Samuel Peacock
Robert Wyrsch	Elishah Jackett	Roice Cleeland	Aidan Anderson	Soane Faasolo

TE
Jack Westover
Devin Culp
Josh Cuevas

WR
Ja'Lynn Polk
Giles Jackson
Denzel Boston

QB
Michael Penix Jr.
Dylan Morris
Austin Mack

RB
Dillon Johnson
Tybo Rogers
Richard Newton

Special teams
PK Grady Gross
P Jack McCallister

== Schedule ==
Date	Time	Opponent	Rank	Site	TV	Result	Attendance
September 2	12:30 p.m.	Boise State*	No. 10	Husky Stadium; Seattle, WA	ABC	W 56–19	67,475
September 9	2:00 p.m.	Tulsa*	No. 8	Husky Stadium; Seattle, WA	P12N	W 43–10	63,128
September 16	2:00 p.m.	at Michigan State*	No. 8	Spartan Stadium; East Lansing, MI	Peacock	W 41–7	70,528
September 23	7:30 p.m.	California	No. 8	Husky Stadium; Seattle, WA	ESPN	W 59–32	69,107
September 30	7:00 p.m.	at Arizona	No. 7	Arizona Stadium; Tucson, AZ	P12N	W 31–24	50,800
October 14	12:30 p.m.	No. 8 Oregon	No. 7	Husky Stadium; Seattle, WA (rivalry, College GameDay)	ABC	W 36–33	71,321
October 21	7:30 p.m.	Arizona State^{†}	No. 5	Husky Stadium; Seattle, WA	FS1	W 15–7	68,379
October 28	4:00 p.m.	at Stanford	No. 5	Stanford Stadium; Stanford, CA	FS1	W 42–33	24,380
November 4	4:30 p.m.	at No. 20 USC	No. 5	Los Angeles Memorial Coliseum; Los Angeles, CA	ABC	W 52–42	72,243
November 11	12:30 p.m.	No. 18 Utah	No. 5	Husky Stadium; Seattle, WA	FOX	W 35–28	70,976
November 18	4:30 p.m.	at No. 11 Oregon State	No. 5	Reser Stadium; Corvallis, OR	ABC	W 22–20	38,415
November 25	1:00 p.m.	Washington State	No. 4	Husky Stadium; Seattle, WA (Apple Cup)	FOX	W 24–21	71,312
December 1	5:00 p.m.	vs. No. 5 Oregon	No. 3	Allegiant Stadium; Paradise, NV (Pac-12 Championship Game)	ABC	W 34–31	61,195
January 1, 2024	5:45 p.m.	vs. No. 3 Texas*	No. 2	Caesars Superdome; New Orleans, LA (Sugar Bowl–CFP Semifinal)	ESPN	W 37–31	68,791
January 8, 2024	4:30 p.m.	vs. No. 1 Michigan*	No. 2	NRG Stadium; Houston, TX (CFP National Championship, College GameDay)	ESPN	L 13–34	72,808
*Non-conference game; ^{†}Homecoming; Rankings from AP Poll (and CFP Rankings, after October 31) - Released prior to game; All times are in Pacific time; Source:

== Game summaries ==
=== vs Boise State ===
Boise State Broncos (0–0) vs No. 10 Washington Huskies (0–0) – Game summary

Quarter	1	2	3	4	Total
Broncos	6	6	7	0	19
No. 10 Huskies	0	28	7	21	56

at Husky Stadium • Seattle, Washington

- Date: September 2
- Game time: 12:30 p.m. PDT
- Game weather: Sunny, 78 °F (26 °C), wind: N 5mph
- Game attendance: 67,475
- Referee: Mark Duddy
- TV announcers (ABC): Bob Wischusen (play-by-play), Robert Griffin III (analyst), and Kris Budden (sideline)

Game information

First quarter

- (02:42) BSU – Ashton Jeanty 7-yard rush, Jonah Dalmas PAT failed (Drive: 10 plays, 90 yards, 4:42; BSU 0–6)

Second quarter

- (12:09) WASH – Jalen McMillan 7-yard pass from Michael Penix Jr., Grady Gross Kick (Drive: 7 plays, 73 yards, 3:32; WASH 7–6)
- (12:06) BSU – Jonah Dalmas 39 Yd Field Goal (Drive: 5 plays, 53 yards, 2:03; BSU 7–9)
- (07:52) WASH – Jalen McMillan 38-yard pass from Michael Penix Jr., Grady Gross Kick (Drive: 3 plays, 59 yards, 1:45; WASH 14–9)
- (05:06) WASH – Ja'Lynn Polk 44-yard pass from Michael Penix Jr., Grady Gross Kick (Drive: 2 plays, 73 yards, 0:43; WASH 21–9)
- (01:27) WASH – Jack Westover 20-yard pass from Michael Penix Jr., Grady Gross Kick (Drive: 3 plays, 40 yards, 0:43; WASH 28–9)
- (00:02) BSU – Jonah Dalmas 34 Yd Field Goal (Drive: 9 plays, 58 yards, 1:26; WASH 28–12)

Third quarter

- (12:49) BSU – Ashton Jeanty 50-yard pass from Taylen Green, Jonah Dalmas Kick (Drive: 4 plays, 75 yards, 2:11; WASH 35–19)

Fourth quarter

- (12:54) WASH – Jalen McMillan 19-yard rush, Grady Gross Kick (Drive: 5 plays, 80 yards, 2:53; WASH 42–19)
- (06:57) WASH – Dillon Johnson 1-yard rush, Grady Gross Kick (Drive: 10 plays, 70 yards, 5:45; WASH 49–19)
- (04:03) WASH – Josh Cuevas 31-yard pass from Dylan Morris, Grady Gross Kick (Drive: 2 plays, 36 yards, 0:44; WASH 56–19)

=== vs Tulsa ===
Tulsa Golden Hurricanes (1–0) vs No. 8 Washington Huskies (1–0) – Game summary

Quarter	1	2	3	4	Total
Golden Hurricane	3	0	0	7	10
No. 8 Huskies	14	8	14	7	43

at Husky Stadium • Seattle, Washington

- Date: September 9
- Game time: 2:00 p.m. PDT
- Game weather: Sunny, 73 °F (23 °C)
- Game attendance: 63,128
- Referee: Jeff Dahle
- TV announcers (Pac-12 Network): J. B. Long (play-by-play) and Yogi Roth (analyst)

Game information

First quarter

- (12:19) WASH – Rome Odunze 2-yard pass from Michael Penix Jr., Grady Gross Kick (Drive: 6 plays, 65 yards, 2:41; WASH 7–0)
- (08:48) TUL – Chase Meyer 44 Yd Field Goal (Drive: 11 plays, 49 yards, 3:31; WASH 7–3)
- (02:46) WASH – Ja'Lynn Polk 27-yard rush, Grady Gross Kick (Drive: 9 plays, 87 yards, 5:52; WASH 14–3)

Second quarter

- (03:55) WASH – Jalen McMillan 9-yard pass from Michael Penix Jr., Jaden Green Pass to Dylan Morris for Two-Point Conversion (Drive: 9 plays, 80 yards, 4:42; WASH 22–3)

Third quarter

- (08:00) WASH – Germie Bernard 7-yard pass from Michael Penix Jr., Grady Gross Kick (Drive: 7 plays, 82 yards, 3:39; WASH 29–3)
- (00:40) WASH – Rome Odunze 14-yard rush, Grady Gross Kick (Drive: 6 plays, 71 yards, 3:35; WASH 36–3)

Fourth quarter

- (11:12) TUL – Luke McGary 15-yard pass from Roman Fuller, Chase Meyer Kick (Drive: 10 plays, 83 yards, 4:23; WASH 36–10)
- (03:00) WASH – Daniyel Ngata 1-yard rush, Grady Gross Kick (Drive: 8 plays, 62 yards, 3:51; WASH 43–10)

=== at Michigan State ===
No. 8 Washington Huskies (2–0) vs Michigan State Spartans (2–0) – Game summary

Quarter	1	2	3	4	Total
No. 8 Huskies	14	21	6	0	41
Spartans	0	0	7	0	7

at Spartan Stadium • East Lansing, Michigan

- Date: September 16
- Game time: 2:00 p.m. PDT/5:00 p.m. EDT
- Game weather: Sunny, 71 °F (22 °C), wind: SW 3mph
- Game attendance: 70,528
- Referee: Matthew Richards
- TV announcers (Peacock): Brendan Burke (play-by-play), Chris Simms (analyst), and Caroline Pineda (sideline)

Game information

First quarter

- (09:51) WASH – Germie Bernard 1-yard rush, Grady Gross Kick (Drive: 4 plays, 55 yards, 2:12; WASH 7–0)
- (01:14) WASH – Jack Westover 5-yard pass from Michael Penix Jr., Grady Gross Kick (Drive: 3 plays, 44 yards, 1:07; WASH 14–0)

Second quarter

- (10:44) WASH – Ja'Lynn Polk 30-yard pass from Michael Penix Jr., Grady Gross Kick (Drive: 3 plays, 95 yards, 1:39; WASH 21–0)
- (06:49) WASH – Jack Westover 13-yard pass from Michael Penix Jr., Grady Gross Kick (Drive: 4 plays, 48 yards, 1:41; WASH 28–0)
- (00:06) WASH – Jack Westover 7-yard pass from Michael Penix Jr., Grady Gross Kick (Drive: 5 plays, 66 yards, 0:35; WASH 35–0)

Third quarter

- (10:43) WASH – Grady Gross 22-yard Field Goal (Drive: 8 plays, 66 yards, 4:10; WASH 38–0)
- (03:45) WASH – Grady Gross 29-yard Field Goal (Drive: 11 plays, 72 yards, 4:48; WASH 41–0)

Fourth quarter

- (05:48) MSU – Katin Houser 4-yard Field Goal (Drive: 10 plays, 83 yards, 4:23; WASH 36–10)
- (03:00) WASH – Daniyel Ngata 5-yard rush, Jonathan Kim Kick (Drive: 11 plays, 99 yards, 5:25; WASH 41–7)

=== vs California ===
California Golden Bears (2–1) vs No. 8 Washington Huskies (3–0) – Game summary

Quarter	1	2	3	4	Total
Golden Bears	6	6	7	13	32
No. 8 Huskies	24	21	7	7	59

at Husky Stadium • Seattle, Washington

- Date: September 23
- Game time: 7:30 p.m. EDT
- Game weather: Cloudy, 58 °F (14 °C), wind: S 5mph
- Game attendance: 69,107
- Referee: Chris Wiggins
- TV announcers (ESPN): Dave Flemming (play-by-play), Brock Osweiler (analyst), and Kayla Burton (sideline)

Game information

First quarter

Second quarter

Third quarter

Fourth quarter

=== at Arizona ===
No. 7 Washington Huskies (4–0) vs Arizona Wildcats (3–1) – Game summary

Quarter	1	2	3	4	Total
No. 7 Huskies	14	7	7	3	31
Wildcats	0	10	7	7	24

at Arizona Stadium • Tucson, Arizona

- Date: September 30
- Game time: 7:00 p.m.
- Game weather: Clear, 89 °F (32 °C), wind: SW 12mph
- Game attendance: 50,800
- Referee: Justin Elliott
- TV announcers (Pac-12 Network): Ted Robinson (play-by-play) and Yogi Roth (analyst)

Game information

First quarter

- (6:02) WASH – Dillon Johnson 4-yard run, Grady Gross kick (Drive: 12 plays, 95 yards, 6:59; Washington 7–0)
- (0:38) WASH – Germie Bernard 3-yard run, Grady Gross kick (Drive: 7 plays, 57 yards, 3:13; Washington 14–0)

Second quarter

- (9:31) ARIZ – Jacob Cowing 8-yard pass from Noah Fifita, Tyler Loop kick (Drive: 12 plays, 75 yards, 6:07; Washington 14–7)
- (3:31) WASH – Will Nixon 5-yard run, Grady Gross kick (Drive: 12 plays, 73 yards, 5:58; Washington 21–7)
- (0:23) ARIZ – Tyler Loop 30-yard field goal (Drive: 12 plays, 62 yards, 3:08; Washington 21–10)

Third quarter

- (6:42) WASH – Dillon Johnson 4-yard run, Grady Gross kick (Drive: 7 plays, 84 yards, 3:34; Washington 28–10)
- (3:03) ARIZ – Tetairoa McMillan 1-yard pass from Noah Fifita, Tyler Loop kick (Drive: 7 plays, 75 yards, 3:39; Washington 28–17)

Fourth quarter

- (13:24) WASH – Grady Gross 37-yard field goal (Drive: 11 plays, 55 yards, 4:39; Washington 31–17)
- (1:08) ARIZ – Tetairoa McMillan 10-yard pass from Noah Fifita, Tyler Loop kick (Drive: 11 plays, 90 yards, 2:47; Washington 31–24)

=== vs No. 8 Oregon ===
No. 8 Oregon Ducks (5–0) vs No. 7 Washington Huskies (5–0) – Game summary

Quarter	1	2	3	4	Total
No. 8 Ducks	8	10	8	7	33
No. 7 Huskies	14	8	7	7	36

at Husky Stadium • Seattle, Washington

- Date: October 14
- Game time: 12:30 p.m.
- Game weather: Cloudy, 63 °F (17 °C), wind: SE 5mph
- Game attendance: 71,321
- Referee: Mike McCabe
- TV announcers (ABC): Chris Fowler (play-by-play), Kirk Herbstreit (analyst), and Holly Rowe (sideline)

Game information

First quarter

Second quarter

Third quarter

Fourth quarter

=== vs Arizona State ===
Arizona State Sun Devils (1–5) vs No. 5 Washington Huskies (6–0) – Game summary

Quarter	1	2	3	4	Total
Sun Devils	0	7	0	0	7
No. 5 Huskies	0	3	0	12	15

at Husky Stadium • Seattle, Washington

- Date: October 21
- Game time: 7:30 p.m.
- Game weather: Rain • Temperature: 54 °F (12 °C) • Wind: N 5mph
- Game attendance: 68,379
- Referee: Jeff Dahle
- TV announcers (FS1): Jeff Levering, Mark Helfrich

Game information

First quarter

No scoring plays

Second quarter

- (4:22) ASU - Cam Skattebo 1-yard run, Dario Longhetto kick (Drive: 8 plays, 53 yards, 4:28; Arizona State 7–0)
- (0:12) WASH – Grady Gross 24-yard field goal (Drive: 11 plays, 73 yards, 4:04; Arizona State 7–3)

Third quarter

No scoring plays

Fourth quarter

- (12:28) WASH – Grady Gross 47-yard field goal (Drive: 7 plays, 40 yards, 2:03; Arizona State 7–6)
- (8:11) WASH – Mishael Powell 89 Yd Interception Return (Two-Point Pass Conversion Failed) (Washington 12–7)
- (3:17) WASH – Grady Gross 24-yard field goal (Drive: 8 plays, 62 yards, 3:02; Washington 15–7)

=== at Stanford ===
No. 5 Washington Huskies (7–0) vs Stanford Cardinal (2–5) – Game summary

Quarter	1	2	3	4	Total
No. 5 Huskies	7	14	7	14	42
Cardinal	0	13	13	7	33

at Stanford Stadium • Stanford, California

- Date: October 28
- Game time: 4:00 p.m.
- Game attendance: 24,380
- Referee: Cravonne Barrett
- TV announcers (FS1): Tim Brando (play-by-play), Spencer Tillman (analyst)

Game information

First quarter

- (6:26) WASH - Jack Westover 1-yard run, Grady Gross kick (Drive: 6 plays, 50 yards, 2:41; WASH 7-0)

Second quarter

- (12:24) STAN - Ashton Daniels 5-yard run, Joshua Karty kick (Drive: 8 plays, 74 yards, 2:55; TIE 7-7)
- (9:20) WASH - Rome Odunze 7-yard pass from Michael Penix Jr., Grady Gross kick (Drive: 9 plays, 75 yards, 3:04; WASH 14-7)
- (5:09) WASH - Ja'Lynn Polk 92-yard pass from Michael Penix Jr., Grady Gross kick (Drive: 1 play, 92 yards, 0:14; WASH 21-7)
- (1:05) STAN - Joshua Karty 23-yard field goal (Drive: 9 plays, 70 yards, 4:04; WASH 21-10)
- (0:00) STAN - Joshua Karty 47-yard field goal (Drive: 8 plays, 38 yards, 0:41; WASH 21-13)

Third quarter

- (10:01) STAN - Elic Ayomanor 39-yard pass from Ashton Daniels, two-point conversion failed (Drive: 3 plays, 68 yards, 1:16; WASH 21-19)
- (3:55) WASH - Ja'Lynn Polk 10-yard pass from Michael Penix Jr., Grady Gross kick (Drive: 6 plays, 52 yards, 1:28; WASH 28-19)
- (1:17) STAN - Ashton Daniels 2-yard run, Joshua Karty kick (Drive: 6 plays, 75 yards, 2:38; WASH 28-26)

Fourth quarter

- (14:14) WASH - Devin Culp 24-yard pass from Michael Penix Jr., Grady Gross kick (Drive: 7 plays, 79 yards, 1:58; WASH 35-26)
- (6:46) STAN - Justin Lemon 2-yard run, Joshua Karty kick (Drive: 8 plays, 83 yards, 4:51; WASH 35-33)
- (1:36) WASH - Dillon Johnson 13-yard run, Grady Gross kick (Drive: 4 plays, 28 yards, 1:44; WASH 42-33)

=== at USC ===
No. 5 Washington Huskies (8–0) vs No. 20 USC Trojans (7–2) – Game summary

Quarter	1	2	3	4	Total
No. 5 Huskies	7	28	7	10	52
No. 20 Trojans	14	14	14	0	42

at Los Angeles Memorial Coliseum • Los Angeles, California

- Date: November 4
- Game time: 4:30 p.m.
- Game weather: Sunny, 73 °F (23 °C)
- Game attendance: 72,243
- Referee: Mark Duddy
- TV announcers (ABC): Chris Fowler, Kirk Herbstreit, Holly Rowe

Game information

First quarter

- (8:56) USC - Raleek Brown 2-yard run, Denis Lynch kick (Drive: 12 plays, 75 yards, 6:04; USC 7-0)
- (3:38) WASH - Dillon Johnson 2-yard run, Grady Gross kick (Drive: 10 plays, 75 yards, 5:18; Tied 7-7)
- (0:35) USC - Caleb Williams 1-yard run, Denis Lynch kick (Drive: 2 plays, 8 yards, 0:49; USC 14-7)

Second quarter

- (11:37) WASH - Devin Culp 22-yard pass from Michael Penix Jr.; Grady Gross kick (Drive: 10 plays, 79 yards, 3;58, Tied 14-14)
- (9:31) USC - Darwin Barlow 1-yard run, Denis Lynch kick (Drive: 5 plays, 95 yards, 2:06; USC 21-14)
- (6:44) WASH - Dillon Johnson 52-yard run, Grady Gross kick (Drive: 5 plays, 75 yards, 2:47; Tied 21-21)
- (4:04) USC - Tahj Washington 41-yard pass from Caleb Williams, Denis Lynch kick (Drive: 5 plays, 75 yards, 2:40; USC 28-21)
- (1:14) WASH - Ja'Lynn Polk 4-yard pass from Michael Penix Jr., Grady Gross kick (Drive: 8 plays, 70 yards, 2:50; Tied 28-28)
- (0:20) WASH - Dillon Johnson 1-yard run, Grady Gross kick (Drive: 3 plays, 12 yards, 0:47; Washington 35-28)

Third quarter

- (8:00) USC - Brenden Rice 25-yard pass from Caleb Williams, Denis Lynch kick (Drive: 8 plays, 80 yards, 3:29; Tied 35-35)
- (4:21) WASH - Michael Penix Jr. 1-yard run, Grady Gross kick (Drive: 7 plays, 75 yards, 3:39; Washington 42-35)
- (1:41) USC - Mario Williams 20-yard pass from Caleb Williams, Denis Lynch kick (Drive: 7 plays, 83 yards, 2:40; Tied 42-42)

Fourth quarter

- (12:25) WASH - Grady Gross 43-yard field goal (Drive: 9 plays, 46 yards, 4:16; Washington 45-42)
- (2:20) WASH - Dillon Johnson 1-yard run, Grady Gross kick (Drive: 9 plays, 91 yards, 5:22; Washington 52-42)

=== vs No. 18 Utah ===
No. 18 Utah Utes (7–2) vs No. 5 Washington Huskies (9–0) – Game summary

Quarter	1	2	3	4	Total
No. 18 Utes	7	21	0	0	28
No. 5 Huskies	10	14	11	0	35

at Husky Stadium • Seattle, Washington

- Date: November 11
- Game time: 12:30 p.m.
- Game weather: Cloudy, 52 °F (11 °C)
- Game attendance: 70,976
- Referee: Mike McCabe
- TV announcers (FOX): Jason Benetti, Brock Huard, Allison Williams

Game information

First quarter

Second quarter

Third quarter

Fourth quarter

=== at No. 11 Oregon State ===
No. 5 Washington Huskies (10–0) vs No. 11 Oregon State Beavers (8–2) – Game summary

Quarter	1	2	3	4	Total
No. 5 Huskies	9	13	0	0	22
No. 11 Beavers	7	3	7	3	20

at Reser Stadium • Corvallis, Oregon

- Date: November 18
- Game time: 4:30 p.m.
- Game weather: Rain, 50 °F (10 °C)
- Game attendance: 38,415
- Referee: Justin Elliott
- TV announcers (ABC): Chris Fowler, Kirk Herbstreit, Holly Rowe

Game information

First quarter

Second quarter

Third quarter

Fourth quarter

=== vs Washington State ===
Washington State Cougars (5-6) vs No. 4 Washington Huskies (11-0) – Game summary

Quarter	1	2	3	4	Total
Cougars	7	7	0	7	21
No. 4 Huskies	7	7	7	3	24

at Husky Stadium • Seattle, Washington

- Date: November 25
- Game time: 1:00 p.m.
- Game weather: Sunny • Temperature: 45 °F (7 °C) • Wind: NE 5 mph
- Game attendance: 71,312
- Referee: Matthew Richards
- TV announcers (FOX): Jason Benetti, Brock Huard, Allison Williams

Game information

First quarter

- (3:54) WASH - Dillon Johnson 1-yard run, Grady Gross kick (Drive: 9 plays, 51 yards, 4:59; Washington 7–0)
- (2:15) WSU – Josh Kelly 21-yard pass from Cameron Ward, Dean Janikowski kick (Drive: 5 plays, 76 yards, 1:34; Tied 7–7)

Second quarter

- (5:37) WASH – Rome Odunze 40-yard pass from Michael Penix Jr., Grady Gross kick (Drive: 3 plays, 49 yards, 1:36; Washington 14–7)
- (0:08) WSU – Kyle Williams 25-yard pass from Cameron Ward, Dean Janikowski kick (Drive: 7 plays, 59 yards, 0:57; Tied 14–14)

Third quarter

- (0:00) WASH – Rome Odunze 21-yard pass from Michael Penix Jr., Grady Gross kick (Drive: 7 plays, 67 yards, 3:49; Washington 21–14)

Fourth quarter

- (5:58) WSU – Lincoln Victor 8-yard pass from Cameron Ward, Dean Janikowski kick (Drive: 13 plays, 65 yards, 5:55; Tied 21–21)
- (0:00) WASH – Grady Gross 42-yard field goal (Drive: 12 plays, 65 yards, 1:59; Washington 24–21)

=== vs No. 5 Oregon (Pac-12 Championship Game) ===
No. 5 Oregon Ducks (11-1) vs No. 3 Washington Huskies (12-0) – Game summary

Quarter	1	2	3	4	Total
No. 5 Ducks	0	10	14	7	31
No. 3 Huskies	10	10	0	14	34

at Allegiant Stadium • Paradise, NV

- Date: December 1
- Game time: 5:00 p.m.
- Game weather: Indoor, 65 °F (18 °C)
- Game attendance: 61,195
- Referee: Mike McCabe
- TV announcers (ABC): Chris Fowler (play-by-play), Kirk Herbstreit (color), and Holly Rowe (sideline)

Game information

First quarter

- (7:34) WASH – Grady Gross 38-yard field goal (Drive: 15 plays, 54 yards, 7:26; Washington 3–0)
- (3:46) WASH – Dillon Johnson 5-yard run, Grady Gross kick (Drive: 6 plays, 50 yards, 3:23; Washington 10–0)

Second quarter

- (8:46) ORE – Camden Lewis 36-yard field goal (Drive: 12 plays, 72 yards, 6:02; Washington 10–3)
- (6:48) WASH – Germie Bernard 4-yard pass from Dillon Johnson, Grady Gross kick (Drive: 4 plays, 75 yards, 1:58; Washington 17–3)
- (1:39) WASH – Grady Gross 37-yard field goal (Drive: 8 plays, 64 yards, 2:58; Washington 20–3)
- (0:09) ORE – Terrance Ferguson 2-yard pass from Bo Nix, Camden Lewis kick (Drive: 7 plays, 75 yards, 1:30; Washington 20–10)

Third quarter

- (9:39) ORE – Terrance Ferguson 2-yard pass from Bo Nix, Camden Lewis kick (Drive: 15 plays, 75 yards, 5:21; Washington 20–17)
- (1:51) ORE – Jordan James 6-yard run, Camden Lewis kick (Drive: 3 plays, 62 yards, 1:30; Oregon 24–20)

Fourth quarter

- (12:23) WASH – Dillon Johnson 1-yard run, Grady Gross kick (Drive: 10 plays, 75 yards, 4:28; Washington 27–24)
- (2:44) WASH – Quentin Moore 2-yard pass from Michael Penix Jr., Grady Gross kick (Drive: 12 plays, 82 yards, 6:20; Washington 34–24)
- (2:14) ORE – Traeshon Holden 63-yard pass from Bo Nix, Camden Lewis kick (Drive: 2 plays, 75 yards, 0:30; Washington 34–31)

=== vs No. 3 Texas (Sugar Bowl-CFP Semifinal) ===
2024 Sugar Bowl presented by Allstate
No. 3 Texas Longhorns (12-1, 8-1) vs No. 2 Washington Huskies (13-0, 9-0) – Game summary

Quarter	1	2	3	4	Total
No. 3 Longhorns	7	14	0	10	31
No. 2 Huskies	7	14	10	6	37

at Caesars Superdome • New Orleans, Louisiana

- Date: January 1, 2024
- Game time: 5:45 p.m. PDT
- Game weather: None (indoor stadium)
- Game attendance: 68,791
- Referee: Ron Snodgrass
- TV announcers (ESPN): Sean McDonough (play-by-play), Greg McElroy (analyst), Molly McGrath (sideline), Katie George (sideline)

Game information

First quarter

- (11:04) WASH – Dillon Johnson 2-yard rush, Grady Gross kick (Drive: 4 plays, 89 yards, 2:59; WASH 7–0)
- (7:06) TEX – Jaydon Blue 5-yard rush, Bert Auburn kick (Drive: 7 plays, 75 yards, 3:55; TIED 7–7)

Second quarter

- (13:08) WASH – WASH – Dillon Johnson 1-yard rush, Grady Gross kick (Drive: 9 plays, 80 yards, 4:26; WASH 14–7)
- (10:08) TEX – Byron Murphy II 1-yard rush, Bert Auburn kick (Drive: 3 plays, 22 yards, 1:37; TIED 14–14)
- (13:08) WASH – WASH – Ja'Lynn Polk 29-yard pass from Michael Penix Jr., Grady Gross kick (Drive: 9 plays, 76 yards, 4:28; WASH 21–14)
- (0:17) TEX – CJ Baxter 1-yard rush, Bert Auburn kick (Drive: 10 plays, 72 yards, 1:10; TIED 21–21)

Third quarter

- (10:30) WASH – Jalen McMillan 19-yard pass from Michael Penix Jr., Grady Gross kick (Drive: 8 plays, 70 yards, 4:30; WASH 28–21)
- (07:44) WASH – Grady Gross 26-yd field goal (Drive: 5 plays, 24 yards, 2:30; WASH 31–21)

Fourth quarter

- (14:51) WASH – Grady Gross 40-yd field goal (Drive: 12 plays, 58 yards, 5:48; WASH 34–21)
- (07:23) TEX – Adonai Mitchell 1-yard rush, Bert Auburn kick (Drive: 10 plays, 72 yards, 3:56; WASH 34–28)
- (02:40) WASH – Grady Gross 27-yd field goal (Drive: 10 plays, 65 yards, 4:43; WASH 37–28)
- (01:09) TEX – Bert Auburn 25-yd field goal (Drive: 8 plays, 68 yards, 1:31; WASH 37–31)

Statistics	Texas	Washington
First downs	23	25
Total yards	498	532
Rushes/yards	24–180	31–102
Passing yards	318	430
Passing: Comp–Att–Int	24–43–0	29–39–0
Time of possession	23:40	36:20

Team	Category	Player	Statistics
Texas	Passing	Quinn Ewers	24/43, 318 yards, TD
Texas	Rushing	CJ Baxter	9 carries, 64 yards, TD
Texas	Receiving	Ja'Tavion Sanders	6 receptions, 75 yards
Washington	Passing	Michael Penix Jr.	29/38, 430 yards, 2 TD
Washington	Rushing	Dillon Johnson	21 carries, 49 yards, 2 TD
Washington	Receiving	Rome Odunze	6 receptions, 125 yards

=== vs No. 1 Michigan (CFP National Championship) ===
2024 College Football Playoff National Championship
No. 1 Michigan Wolverines (14–0, 9–0) vs No. 2 Washington Huskies (14–0, 9–0) – Game summary

Quarter	1	2	3	4	Total
No. 1 Wolverines	14	3	3	14	34
No. 2 Huskies	3	7	3	0	13

at NRG Stadium • Houston, Texas

- Date: January 8, 2024
- Game time: 4:30 p.m. PDT
- Game weather: None (indoor stadium)
- Game attendance: 72,808
- TV announcers (ESPN): Chris Fowler (play-by-play), Kirk Herbstreit (analyst), Holly Rowe and Molly McGrath (sidelines), Bill Lemonnier (rules analyst), Marty Jaramillo (sports injury analyst)

Game information

First quarter

- (10:14) UM - Donovan Edwards 41 yd run, James Turner kick (Drive: 8 plays, 84 yards, TOP 04:42; MICH 7-0)
- (03:56) UW - Grady Gross 25 yd field goal (Drive: 14 plays, 67 yards, TOP 06:18; MICH 7-3)
- (02:23) UM - Donovan Edwards 46 yd run, James Turner kick (Drive: 4 plays, 86 yards, TOP 01:27; MICH 14-3)

Second quarter

- (13:28) UM - James Turner 31 yd field goal (Drive: 5 plays, 65 yards, TOP 01:53; MICH 17-3)
- (00:42) UW - Jalen McMillan 3 yd pass from Michael Penix Jr., Grady Gross kick (Drive: 11 plays, 61 yards, TOP 04:01; MICH 17-10)

Third quarter

- (11:55) UM - James Turner 38 yd field goal (Drive: 6 plays, 12 yards, TOP 03:00; MICH 20-10)
- (08:58) UW - Grady Gross 45 yd field goal (Drive: 7 plays, 47 yards, TOP 02:57; MICH 20-13)

Fourth quarter

- (07:09) UM - Blake Corum 12 yd run, James Turner kick (Drive: 5 plays, 71 yards, TOP 02:35; MICH 27-13)
- (03:37) UM - Blake Corum 1 yd run, James Turner kick (Drive: 2 plays, 8 yards, TOP 00:52; MICH 34-13)

Statistics	Michigan	Washington
First downs	16	17
Total yards	443	301
Rushes/yards	38–303	20–46
Passing yards	140	255
Passing: Comp–Att–Int	10–19–0	27–51–2
Time of possession	29:16	30:44

Team	Category	Player	Statistics
Michigan	Passing	J. J. McCarthy	10/18, 140 yards
Michigan	Rushing	Blake Corum	21 carries, 134 yards, 2 TD
Michigan	Receiving	Colston Loveland	3 receptions, 64 yards
Washington	Passing	Michael Penix Jr.	27/51, 255 yards, TD, 2 INT
Washington	Rushing	Dillon Johnson	11 carries, 33 yards
Washington	Receiving	Rome Odunze	5 receptions, 87 yards

== Rankings ==
Ranking movements Legend: ██ Increase in ranking ██ Decrease in ranking ( ) = First-place votes
	Week															
Poll	Pre	1	2	3	4	5	6	7	8	9	10	11	12	13	14	Final
AP	10	8	8	8	7 (1)	7	7	5 (2)	5	5	5	5	4	3	2 (11)	2
Coaches	11	8	8	8	8 (1)	8 (1)	6 (1)	5	5	5	5	5	5	3	2 (8)	2
CFP	Not released									5	5	5	4	3	2	Not released

== Awards and honors ==
=== Individual awards ===
Individual yearly awards
Name	Position	Award	Ref.
Kalen DeBoer	Head coach	AP Coach of the Year; Eddie Robinson Coach of the Year; Home Depot Coach of the Year; Sporting News Coach of the Year; Walter Camp Coach of the Year; Pac-12 Coach of the Year; AP Pac-12 Coach of the Year	
Michael Penix Jr.	QB	Maxwell Award	
Troy Fautanu	OT	Morris Trophy	
Offensive line		Joe Moore Award	

=== All-Pac-12 team ===
All-Pac-12
Player	Position	Team
Rome Odunze	WR	1st
Troy Fautanu	OT	1st
Bralen Trice	DE	1st
Edefuan Ulofoshio	LB	1st
Michael Penix Jr.	QB	2nd
Dillon Johnson	RB	2nd
Parker Brailsford	C	2nd
Jabbar Muhammad	CB	2nd
Carson Bruener	LB	HM
Devin Culp	TE	HM
Dominique Hampton	S	HM
Roger Rosengarten	OT	HM
Zion Tupuola-Fetui	DE	HM
Jack Westover	TE	HM
HM = Honorable mention. Source:

=== All-Americans ===
NCAA recognized All-American honors
Player	AP	AFCA	FWAA	TSN	WCFF	Designation
Michael Penix Jr.	2nd	2nd	2nd	2nd	1st	
Rome Odunze	1st	2nd	1st	1st	2nd	Consensus All-American
Troy Fautanu	3rd	2nd	2nd			
Bralen Trice	3rd					
Edefuan Ulofoshio	3rd					
The NCAA recognizes a selection to all five of the AP, AFCA, FWAA, TSN and WCFF first teams for unanimous selections and three of five for consensus selections. HM = Honorable mention. Source:

Other All-American honors
Player	Athletic	Athlon	BR	CBS Sports	CFN	ESPN	FOX Sports	Phil Steele	SI	USA Today
Michael Penix Jr.	2nd			2nd	3rd		2nd			
Rome Odunze	1st		1st	1st	1st		1st		1st	2nd

== Notes ==
- Michael Penix, Jr. set a new University of Washington record for passing yards in a season with 4903 yards. This eclipsed Penix's own record from 2022.
