= 2024 Sugar Bowl =

College Football Playoff Semifinal bowl game

2024 Allstate Sugar Bowl
- College Football Playoff Semifinal; 90th Sugar Bowl
Texas Longhorns	Washington Huskies
(12–1)	(13–0)
Big 12	Pac-12
31	37
Head coach: Steve Sarkisian	Head coach: Kalen DeBoer
AP / Coaches / CFP; 3 / 4T / 3	AP / Coaches / CFP; 2 / 2 / 2
	1	2	3	4	Total
Texas	7	14	0	10	31
Washington	7	14	10	6	37
- Date: January 1, 2024
- Season: 2023
- Stadium: Caesars Superdome
- Location: New Orleans, Louisiana
- MOP: Michael Penix Jr. (QB, Washington); Bralen Trice (DE, Washington)
- Favorite: Texas by 3½
- National anthem: Mark-Anthony Thomas
- Referee: Ron Snodgrass (Big Ten)
- Attendance: 68,791

United States TV coverage
- Network: ESPN; ESPN Deportes
- Announcers: ESPN: Sean McDonough (play-by-play), Greg McElroy (analyst), Molly McGrath and Katie George (sidelines); ESPN Deportes: Ciro Procuna (play-by-play) and Ramiro Pruneda (analyst)
- Nielsen ratings: (18.4 million viewers)

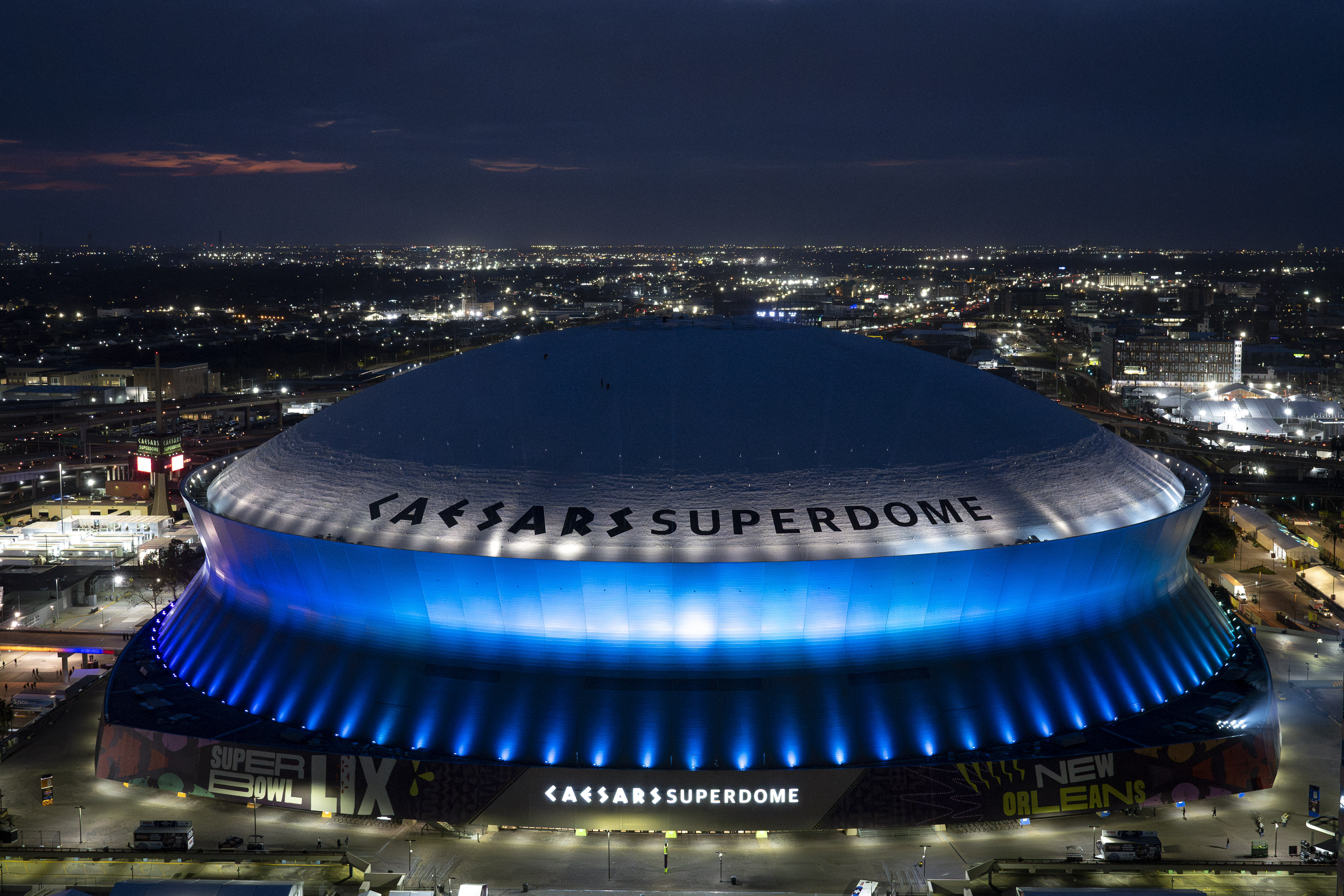
Caesars Superdome in New Orleans, Louisiana, hosted the Sugar Bowl.

The 2024 Sugar Bowl (officially known as the College Football Playoff Semifinal at the Allstate Sugar Bowl for sponsorship reasons) was a college football bowl game played on January 1, 2024, at the Caesars Superdome in New Orleans, Louisiana. The game was the 90th annual playing of the Sugar Bowl, one of the semifinals of the 2023–24 College Football Playoff (CFP), and was one of the bowl games concluding the 2023 FBS football season. The game began at approximately 7:45 p.m. CST and aired on ESPN. It featured two of the four teams chosen by the selection committee to participate in the playoff: the third-ranked Texas Longhorns of the Big 12 Conference and the second-ranked Washington Huskies of the Pac-12 Conference. The winner qualified through to the 2024 College Football Playoff National Championship against the winner of the other semifinal, hosted at the Rose Bowl.

Washington entered with an undefeated 13–0 record, while Texas entered with a mark of 12–1. Both teams were champions of their respective conferences: Washington defeated Oregon in the Pac-12 Championship and Texas defeated Oklahoma State in the Big 12 Championship. It was the sixth meeting between Washington and Texas, and the Longhorns led the overall series 3–2 entering the game. This was Washington's second CFP appearance, after their selection to the 2016 Peach Bowl, and the game marked Texas's CFP debut.

The game's first score came after four minutes on a 2-yard Dillon Johnson touchdown rush and Texas tied the game four minutes later. Each team scored two touchdowns in the second quarter: Johnson and Ja'Lynn Polk scored for the Huskies and Byron Murphy II and CJ Baxter scored for the Longhorns. Washington took their largest lead of the game after beginning the second half with thirteen unanswered points from a Jalen McMillan touchdown and two field goals by placekicker Grady Gross. Texas scored a touchdown with fewer than eight minutes left in the game on a 1-yard pass from Quinn Ewers to Adonai Mitchell, pulling them within six points, and they remained there after the teams traded field goals with 2:40 and 1:09 remaining in the game. After a Washington punt, Texas drove down the field but ultimately failed to convert a fourth down play as time expired, giving Washington a six-point win and a bid to the national championship game.

== Background ==
The Sugar Bowl was held at Tulane Stadium in New Orleans from its inception in 1935 until 1974; since 1975 it has been held in Caesars Superdome (formerly the Louisiana Superdome and the Mercedes-Benz Superdome). The Sugar Bowl became part of the Bowl Championship Series (BCS) from its first year in 1998 and hosted the BCS National Championship Game in 2000 and 2004. After the establishment of the College Football Playoff (CFP) beginning with the 2014 season, it hosted CFP semifinal games in 2015, 2018, and 2021 prior to the 2024 contest.

=== College Football Playoff ===
The four teams competing in the Playoff were chosen by the CFP selection committee, whose final rankings were released on December 3, 2023. The committee selected No. 1 Michigan of the Big Ten Conference, No. 2 Washington of the Pac-12 Conference, No. 3 Texas of the Big 12 Conference, and No. 4 Alabama of the Southeastern Conference (SEC). Each team was the champion of its respective conference. Michigan and Washington entered the playoff with undefeated 13–0 records while Texas and Alabama entered 12–1.

Semifinals
January 1 – Rose Bowl Rose Bowl Stadium, Pasadena
1	Michigan (OT)	27
4	Alabama	20
January 1 – Sugar Bowl Caesars Superdome, New Orleans
2	Washington	37
3	Texas	31

Championship
January 8 – National Championship NRG Stadium, Houston
1	Michigan	34
2	Washington	13

== Teams ==
The game featured Pac-12 champions Washington and Big 12 champions Texas. This was the sixth all-time meeting between the teams, with Texas entering this matchup leading the overall series, 3–2. They had last played in the year before in the 2022 Alamo Bowl, where Washington defeated Texas, 27–20. The Sugar Bowl was the teams' fourth meeting at a neutral site; Washington had won two of those previous three games.

The game took place in the midst of upcoming conference moves by both teams: Washington joined the Big Ten effective August 2, 2024, while Texas joined the SEC effective July 1.

=== Washington ===
Washington finished the regular season with an undefeated 12–0 record which included a three-point home win over No. 8 Oregon on October 14. During the regular season, they won each of their last eight games by a margin of 10 points or fewer; four of those opponents, including Oregon, were ranked in the AP Poll at the time of the game. Washington's unbeaten conference record set up a rematch with Oregon in the Pac-12 Championship, where the Huskies again won by three points. This improved their record to 13–0 and they were selected as the No. 2 team in the final CFP rankings.

This was Washington's first Sugar Bowl appearance—and the first by any Pac-12 team—and marked Washington's 42nd appearance in a bowl game. It was their second CFP appearance, the first being a loss to No. 1 Alabama in the 2016 Peach Bowl.

=== Texas ===
Texas finished the regular season with a record of 11–1. The Longhorns earned an upset win over No. 3 Alabama in their second game, though roughly a month later they lost to No. 12 Oklahoma in the Red River Rivalry by four points. Texas won each of their next six games, earning them a berth in the 2023 Big 12 Championship Game against No. 19 Oklahoma State. Texas won the game, 49–21, behind a career-high 452 passing yards from quarterback Quinn Ewers, to clinch their first conference championship since 2009. Texas was selected as the No. 3 seed in the final CFP rankings and entered the Sugar Bowl with a record of 12–1.

This was Texas's first CFP appearance and their 59th all-time bowl game appearance.

== Game summary ==
The game's officiating crew, led by referee Ron Snodgrass, represented the Big Ten Conference. The game took place on January 1, 2024, and was scheduled to begin at 7:45 p.m. local CST but actually began at 8:01 p.m. Texas entered as favorites to win the game, and the point spread was set at 4.5 points with an over–under of 63.5 points.

The game was broadcast on ESPN, with play-by-play commentary from Sean McDonough, analysis from Greg McElroy, and sideline reporting from Molly McGrath and Katie George. The ESPN Radio broadcast featured Marc Kestecher on play-by-play, with analysis from Kelly Stouffer and sideline reporting from Ian Fitzsimmons. ESPN also offered Field Pass with the Pat McAfee Show on ESPN2 and Command Center on ESPNU, as well as a Spanish-language ESPN Deportes broadcast with commentary from Ciro Procuna and Ramiro Pruneda. The Longhorn Radio Network broadcast the game in both English and Spanish, with Craig Way, Roger Wallace, and Will Matthews on the English call and Rubén Pizarro-Silva, Arturo Mata, and Jesus Mendoza on the Spanish call. The Washington Sports Network broadcast featured commentary from Tony Castricone, Cameron Cleeland, and Elise Woodward.

The pregame coin toss was won by Washington, who deferred their choice to the second half, thereby giving Texas possession of the ball to begin the game.

=== First half ===
The game opened with a kickoff by Washington placekicker Grady Gross which was returned by Jaydon Blue to the Texas 34-yard line. CJ Baxter rushed for a 16-yard gain and a first down on the game's second play from scrimmage but the Longhorns failed to gain any additional yardage after that play and punted on fourth down. On Washington's first drive, they gained five yards in two plays before a 77-yard pass from Michael Penix Jr. to Ja'Lynn Polk scored the game's first touchdown. Gross made the extra point kick, giving Washington a 7–0 lead. The Longhorns tied the game on their ensuing offensive possession; a 31-yard pass from Quinn Ewers to Baxter on their second play moved them into Washington territory, and Blue scored on a 5-yard rush five plays later. Bert Auburn made the extra point for Texas, pulling Texas even at seven points apiece. Washington's next drive resulted in the game's first three-and-out after the Huskies failed to convert 3rd & 4 and punted on the next play, giving Texas the ball on their own 35-yard line. Washington's Bralen Trice sacked Ewers on first down and the Longhorns suffered holding penalties on back-to-back plays, setting them back to 3rd & 27. They punted on the next play, and the first quarter ended with Washington in possession of the ball on the Texas 26-yard line five plays later.

The Huskies began the second quarter with a 17-yard gain on a rush by Tybo Rogers, and a 1-yard rush by Dillon Johnson three plays later put them back in the lead by seven points. The ensuing Texas drive saw a net total of six yards gained ended with a three-and-out, but the Ryan Sanborn punt was muffed by Washington's Germie Bernard and recovered for Texas by Morice Blackwell Jr. at the Huskies' 22-yard line. Texas ran three offensive plays before tying the game on a 1-yard touchdown rush by Byron Murphy II. Following a touchback, Washington gained 52 yards to open the possession on a pass from Penix to Rome Odunze but gained only nine yards on the three following plays and decided to go for it on 4th & 1 but failed to gain the required yard. This gave Texas the ball via a turnover on downs but the Longhorns punted four plays later. On their ensuing drive, Washington again faced 4th & 1 and again elected to go for it. Johnson carried the ball on the play and gained five yards, giving the Huskies a first down, and the team gained a further two first downs on their next three plays. The drive concluded with a 29-yard touchdown pass from Penix to Polk, restoring Washington's seven-point lead with eighty seconds left in the half. Texas began their next drive with three first downs in their first six plays and reached the Washington 3-yard line following a personal foul and Baxter scored a rushing touchdown on the next play. The game again tied, Washington took a knee to run out the remaining seventeen seconds and the game went to halftime.

=== Second half ===
Washington began the third quarter with possession of the ball and completed an eight-play drive, using six completed passes by Penix, with a 19-yard Jalen McMillan receiving touchdown. After the ensuing extra point and kickoff, Texas fumbled on their first offensive play of the half. The ball was recovered by Washington's Asa Turner at the Texas 33-yard line, and the Huskies capitalized with a 19-yard gain on their next play and a 26-yard field goal scored by Gross to conclude the drive and give them a 31–21 lead. Texas regained the ball at their own 20-yard line with 7:29 left in the quarter and gained 16 yards on their first play following a rush by Blue but a false start penalty set them back five yards and they ultimately punted on 4th & 5. Beginning their next drive on their own 19-yard line, the Huskies reached Texas territory in five plays and reached the red zone on their last play of the third quarter.

The fourth quarter started with an incomplete pass followed by a 40-yard field goal made by Gross, increasing Washington's lead to thirteen points. Texas suffered their second fumble on their next possession; after three plays, Blue fumbled following a pass from Ewers and the ball was recovered at the Washington 24-yard line by Ralen Goforth. A 15-yard gain on second down were the only yards the Huskies gained on their ensuing drive, which resulted in a punt which was returned by Xavier Worthy to the Texas 28-yard line. A 38-yard gain on a 3rd & 5 pass from Ewers to Worthy put the Longhorns offense in the Washington red zone, and four plays later they scored on a 1-yard pass from Ewers to Adonai Mitchell. The extra point, made by Auburn, pulled Texas within six points. Following a touchback, Washington reached midfield in four plays and shortly afterward gained 32 yards on a pass from Penix to Odunze. After gaining no yards on the next three plays, Gross made a 27-yard field goal, giving Washington a 37–28 lead. Texas scored a field goal of their own on their next drive and attempted an onside kick but were unsuccessful, giving Washington the ball on the Texas 44-yard line. Washington went three-and-out on the drive and punted. The Longhorns got the ball on their own 31-yard line following a penalty for kick catch interference and reached the Washington 28-yard line following a 41-yard pass on third down. After another first down, on a 16-yard pass to Blue, Texas lost a yard and then threw two incomplete passes, giving them a 4th & 11. On the play, Ewers threw an incomplete pass intended for Mitchell with no time remaining, giving Washington a 37–31 victory.

=== Scoring summary ===
College Football Playoff Semifinal at the 2024 Allstate Sugar Bowl

Quarter	1	2	3	4	Total
No. 3 Texas	7	14	0	10	31
No. 2 Washington	7	14	10	6	37

at Caesars Superdome • New Orleans, Louisiana

- Date: January 1, 2024
- Game time: 7:45 p.m. CST
- Game weather: n/a (game played indoors)
- Game attendance: 68,791
- Referee: Ron Snodgrass
- TV announcers (ESPN): Sean McDonough (play-by-play), Greg McElroy (analyst), Molly McGrath and Katie George (sidelines)
- Box score

Scoring summary

Quarter	Time	Drive			Team	Scoring information	Score	
Quarter	Time	Plays	Yards	TOP	Team	Scoring information	Texas	Washington
1	11:01	4	89	2:56	Washington	Dillon Johnson 2-yard touchdown run, Grady Gross kick good	0	7
1	7:06	7	75	3:50	Texas	Jaydon Blue 5-yard touchdown run, Bert Auburn kick good	7	7
2	13:08	9	80	4:26	Washington	Dillon Johnson 1-yard touchdown run, Grady Gross kick good	7	14
2	10:08	3	22	1:37	Texas	Byron Murphy II 1-yard touchdown run, Bert Auburn kick good	14	14
2	1:27	9	76	4:28	Washington	Ja'Lynn Polk 29-yard touchdown reception from Michael Penix Jr., Grady Gross kick good	14	21
2	0:17	10	72	1:03	Texas	CJ Baxter 3-yard touchdown run, Bert Auburn kick good	21	21
3	10:30	8	70	4:30	Washington	Jalen McMillan 19-yard touchdown reception from Michael Penix Jr., Grady Gross kick good	21	28
3	7:44	5	24	2:30	Washington	26-yard field goal by Grady Gross	21	31
4	14:51	12	58	5:48	Washington	40-yard field goal by Grady Gross	21	34
4	7:23	10	72	3:56	Texas	Adonai Mitchell 1-yard touchdown reception from Quinn Ewers, Bert Auburn kick good	28	34
4	2:40	10	65	4:43	Washington	27-yard field goal by Grady Gross	28	37
4	1:09	8	68	1:25	Texas	25-yard field goal by Bert Auburn	31	37
"TOP" = time of possession. For other American football terms, see Glossary of American football.							31	37

== Statistics ==
Team statistical comparison
Statistic	Texas	Washington
First downs	23	25
First downs rushing	8	6
First downs passing	13	17
First downs penalty	2	2
Third down efficiency	4–12	3–11
Fourth down efficiency	0–1	1–2
Total plays–net yards	71–498	70–532
Rushing attempts–net yards	28–180	31–102
Yards per rush	6.4	3.3
Yards passing	318	430
Pass completions–attempts	24–43	29–39
Interceptions thrown	0	0
Punt returns–total yards	3–(−2)	1–0
Kickoff returns–total yards	7–132	0–0
Punts–average yardage	5–47.4	3–36.0
Fumbles–lost	4–2	1–1
Penalties–yards	10–66	5–38
Time of possession	23:40	36:20

Texas statistics
Longhorns passing
	C–A	Yds	TD–INT
Quinn Ewers	24–43	318	1–0
Longhorns rushing
	Car	Yds	TD
CJ Baxter	9	64	1
Jaydon Blue	9	59	1
Quinn Ewers	8	54	0
Jordan Whittington	1	2	0
Byron Murphy II	1	1	1
Longhorns receiving
	Rec	Yds	TD
Ja'Tavion Sanders	6	75	0
Jordan Whittington	4	70	0
Xavier Worthy	2	45	0
Jaydon Blue	4	45	0
CJ Baxter	2	39	0
Adonai Mitchell	4	32	1
Malik Agbo	1	6	0
Gunnar Helm	1	6	0

Washington statistics
Huskies passing
	C–A	Yds	TD–INT
Michael Penix Jr.	29–38	430	2–0
Jalen McMillan	0–1	0	0–0
Huskies rushing
	Car	Yds	TD
Dillon Johnson	21	49	2
Michael Penix Jr.	3	31	0
Tybo Rogers	5	19	0
Germie Bernard	1	4	0
TEAM	1	−1	0
Huskies receiving
	Rec	Yds	TD
Rome Odunze	6	125	0
Ja'Lynn Polk	5	122	1
Jack Westover	6	59	0
Jalen McMillan	5	58	1
Germie Bernard	3	48	0
Dillon Johnson	3	18	0
Tybo Rogers	1	0	0

== Aftermath ==
With the win, Washington advanced to the 2024 College Football Playoff National Championship, where they faced Rose Bowl champions Michigan. Washington quarterback Michael Penix Jr. and defensive end Bralen Trice were named the game's offensive and defensive most outstanding players, respectively.

The game drew a viewership of 18.7 million, making it the fourth-most viewed Sugar Bowl since 2004.
