= Joe Moore Award =

College football offensive line award

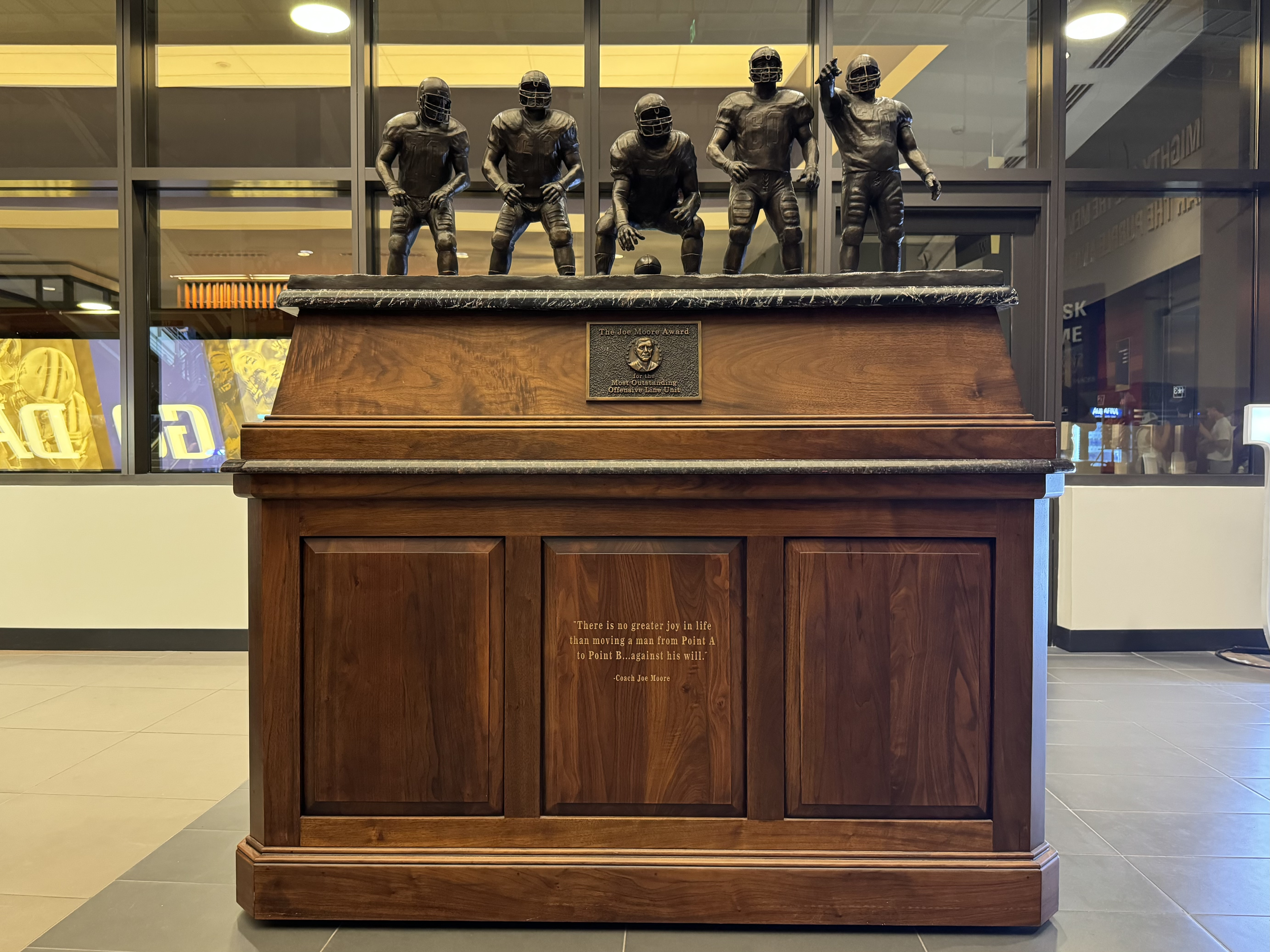
- Awarded for: Best college football offensive line unit
- Country: United States
- Presented by: Joe Moore Foundation for Teamwork

History
- First award: 2015
- Most recent: Iowa (2025)
- Website: Joe Moore Award

The Joe Moore Award is awarded annually to the best college football offensive line unit. The award is presented by the Joe Moore Foundation for Teamwork, and they state that "The Joe Moore Award for the Most Outstanding Offensive Line Unit will annually recognize the toughest, most physical offensive line in the country", making it the only major college football award to honor a unit or group.

The award's namesake, Joe Moore, was a long-time offensive line coach at Notre Dame and Pittsburgh. The award was created with the help of former Notre Dame All-American offensive guard Aaron Taylor, who played for Moore.

The award was first given after the 2015 college football season. A committee of voters are made up of all 128 FBS offensive line coaches, media members who played offensive line and a "legacy committee", including colleagues of Moore and players who were coached by him.

== Winners ==
Year	Winner	SL (Note: The players shown are those who started the most games at their respective positions. The formation may have varied throughout the season.)	Ref.
2015	Alabama Crimson Tide	(Note: Starting lineup: Left tackle: Cam Robinson; Left guard: Ross Pierschbacher; Center: Ryan Kelly; Right guard: Alphonse Taylor; Right tackle: Dominick Jackson)	
2016	Iowa Hawkeyes	(Note: Starting lineup: Left tackle: Boone Myers; Left guard: Keegan Render; Center: James Daniels; Right guard: Sean Welsh; Right tackle: Ike Boettger)	
2017	Notre Dame Fighting Irish	(Note: Starting lineup: Left tackle: Mike McGlinchey; Left guard: Quenton Nelson; Center: Sam Mustipher; Right guard: Alex Bars; Right tackle: Tommy Kraemer)	
2018	Oklahoma Sooners	(Note: Starting lineup: Left tackle: Bobby Evans; Left guard: Ben Powers; Center: Creed Humphrey; Right guard: Dru Samia; Right tackle: Cody Ford)	
2019	LSU Tigers	(Note: Starting lineup: Left tackle: Saahdiq Charles; Left guard: Adrian Magee; Center: Lloyd Cushenberry; Right guard: Damien Lewis; Right tackle: Austin Deculus)	
2020	Alabama Crimson Tide (2)	(Note: Starting lineup: Left tackle: Alex Leatherwood; Left guard: Deonte Brown; Center: Landon Dickerson; Right guard: Emil Ekiyor Jr.; Right tackle: Evan Neal)	
2021	Michigan Wolverines	(Note: Starting lineup: Left tackle: Ryan Hayes; Left guard: Trevor Keegan; Center: Andrew Vastardis; Right guard: Zak Zinter; Right tackle: Andrew Stueber)	
2022	Michigan Wolverines (2)	(Note: Starting lineup: Left tackle: Ryan Hayes; Left guard: Trevor Keegan; Center: Olu Oluwatimi; Right guard: Zak Zinter; Right tackle: Karsen Barnhart)	
2023	Washington Huskies	(Note: Starting lineup: Left tackle: Troy Fautanu; Left guard: Nate Kalepo; Center: Parker Brailsford; Right guard: Julius Buelow; Right tackle: Roger Rosengarten)	
2024	Army Black Knights	(Note: Starting lineup: Left tackle: Connor Finucane; Left guard: Paolo Gennarelli; Center: Brady Small; Right guard: Bill Katsigiannis; Right tackle: Lucas Scott)	
2025	Iowa Hawkeyes (2)	(Note: Starting lineup: Left tackle: Trevor Lauck; Left guard: Beau Stephens; Center: Logan Jones; Right guard: Kade Pieper; Right tackle: Gennings Dunker)	

== See also ==
- Jim Parker Trophy
- Outland Trophy
- Rimington Trophy
