= 2023 Pac-12 Football Championship Game =

- Conference championship
Oregon Ducks	Washington Huskies
(11–1)	(12–0)
31	34
Head coach: Dan Lanning	Head coach: Kalen DeBoer
AP / Coaches / CFP; 5 / 5 / 5	AP / Coaches / CFP; 3 / 3 / 3
	1	2	3	4	Total
Oregon	0	10	14	7	31
Washington	10	10	0	14	34
- Date: December 1, 2023
- Season: 2023
- Stadium: Allegiant Stadium
- Location: Paradise, NV
- MVP: Michael Penix Jr. (QB, Washington)
- Favorite: Oregon by 9.5
- Attendance: 61,195

United States TV coverage
- Network: ABC; ESPN Radio
- Announcers: Chris Fowler (play-by-play), Kirk Herbstreit (color), and Holly Rowe (sideline) (ABC); Marc Kestecher (play-by-play), Kelly Stouffer (analyst), and Ian Fitzsimmons (sideline reporter) (ESPN Radio)

International TV coverage
- Network: ESPN Brazil
- Announcers: Vinicius Moura (play-by-play) and Weinny Eirado (analyst)

2023 Pac-12 Conference football standings
	Conf.			Overall
Team	W		L	W		L
No. 2 Washington y$^	9	–	0	14	–	1
No. 6 Oregon y	8	–	1	12	–	2
No. 11 Arizona	7	–	2	10	–	3
Oregon State	5	–	4	8	–	5
Utah	5	–	4	8	–	5
USC	5	–	4	8	–	5
California	4	–	5	6	–	7
UCLA	4	–	5	8	–	5
Washington State	2	–	7	5	–	7
Stanford	2	–	7	3	–	9
Arizona State*	2	–	7	3	–	9
Colorado	1	–	8	4	–	8
Championship: Washington 34, Oregon 31
^ – College Football Playoff participant; $ – Conference champion; y – Championship game participant; * – Ineligible for postseason play due to self-imposed ban for 2020 recruiting violations; Rankings from AP Poll

The 2023 Pac-12 Football Championship Game was a college football game played on December 1, 2023, at Allegiant Stadium in the Las Vegas-area community of Paradise, Nevada. It was the 13th edition of the Pac-12 Football Championship Game and determined the champion of the Pac-12 Conference for the 2023 season. The game featured the Washington Huskies and the Oregon Ducks.

== Teams ==
The 2023 Pac-12 Championship Game featured the Washington Huskies representing the #1 seed, and the Oregon Ducks representing the #2 seed.

The rivals previously met in the regular season on October 14, 2023, a 36–33 Washington win.

Formerly members of the Pac-12 North Division, the teams were previously unable to rematch in the Pac-12 championship game. However, a 2022 NCAA and conference rule change eliminated the North versus South divisional matchup. This was the final regular season game in the Pac-12 Conference for both teams, and the final championship game in the conference, as all but two members moved to other conferences starting in the 2024 season. Oregon and Washington began playing in the Big Ten Conference in 2024.

=== Washington Huskies ===
The Huskies clinched the top seed in the game with their win over Oregon State on November 18.

This was the third and final Pac-12 title game appearance for Washington and their first since 2018. Having won both of their previous appearances in 2016 and 2018, they finished 3–0 in overall appearances including this game.

=== Oregon Ducks ===
The Ducks clinched the second seed with their victory over Oregon State on November 24.

This was the sixth and final Pac-12 title game appearance for Oregon and their first since 2021. They were 4-1 in previous appearances heading into the game and finished 4–2 overall.

== Scoring summary ==
2023 Pac-12 Football Championship Game presented by 76

Quarter	1	2	3	4	Total
No. 5 Ducks	0	10	14	7	31
No. 3 Huskies	10	10	0	14	34

at Allegiant Stadium • Las Vegas, Nevada

- Date: December 1, 2023
- Game time: 5:00 p.m. PST
- Game weather: Indoor
- Game attendance: 61,195
- Referee: Mike McCabe
- TV announcers (ABC): Chris Fowler (play-by-play), Kirk Herbstreit (color), and Holly Rowe (sideline)

Game information

First Quarter

- (7:34) WASH – Grady Gross 38-yard field goal (Drive: 15 plays, 54 yards, 7:26; Washington 3–0)
- (3:46) WASH – Dillon Johnson 5-yard run, Grady Gross kick (Drive: 6 plays, 50 yards, 3:23; Washington 10–0)

Second Quarter

- (8:46) ORE – Camden Lewis 36-yard field goal (Drive: 12 plays, 72 yards, 6:02; Washington 10–3)
- (6:48) WASH – Germie Bernard 4-yard pass from Dillon Johnson, Grady Gross kick (Drive: 4 plays, 75 yards, 1:58; Washington 17–3)
- (1:39) WASH – Grady Gross 37-yard field goal (Drive: 8 plays, 64 yards, 2:58; Washington 20–3)
- (0:09) ORE – Terrance Ferguson 2-yard pass from Bo Nix, Camden Lewis kick (Drive: 7 plays, 75 yards, 1:30; Washington 20–10)

Third Quarter

- (9:39) ORE – Terrance Ferguson 2-yard pass from Bo Nix, Camden Lewis kick (Drive: 15 plays, 75 yards, 5:21; Washington 20–17)
- (1:51) ORE – Jordan James 6-yard run, Camden Lewis kick (Drive: 3 plays, 62 yards, 1:30; Oregon 24–20)

Fourth Quarter

- (12:23) WASH – Dillon Johnson 1-yard run, Grady Gross kick (Drive: 10 plays, 75 yards, 4:28; Washington 27–24)
- (2:44) WASH – Quentin Moore 2-yard pass from Michael Penix Jr., Grady Gross kick (Drive: 12 plays, 82 yards, 6:20; Washington 34–24)
- (2:14) ORE – Traeshon Holden 63-yard pass from Bo Nix, Camden Lewis kick (Drive: 2 plays, 75 yards, 0:30; Washington 34–31)

Statistics	ORE	WAS
First downs	17	26
Plays–yards	54–363	78–481
Rushes–yards	20–124	37–157
Passing yards	239	324
Passing: comp–att–int	21–34–1	29–41–1
Turnovers		
Time of possession	22:52	37:08

Team	Category	Player	Statistics
Oregon	Passing	Bo Nix	21/34, 239 yards, 3 TDs, 1 INT
Oregon	Rushing	Bo Nix	6 carries, 69 yards
Oregon	Receiving	Tez Johnson	5 receptions, 68 yards
Washington	Passing	Michael Penix	27/39, 319 yards, 1 TD, 1 INT
Washington	Rushing	Dillon Johnson	28 carries, 152 yards, 2 TDs
Washington	Receiving	Jalen McMillan	9 receptions, 131 yards
