= Lucas Scott (American football) =

American football player (born 2003)

No. 47 – Baltimore Ravens
- Position: Fullback
- Roster status: Practice squad

Personal information
- Born: August 25, 2003 (age 23); Binghamton, New York, U.S.
- Listed height: 6 ft 3 in (1.91 m)
- Listed weight: 290 lb (132 kg)

Career information
- High school: Chenango Forks (NY)
- College: Army (2021–2024)
- NFL draft: 2025: undrafted

Career history
- Baltimore Ravens (2025–present)*
- * Offseason or practice squad member only

Awards and highlights
- Second-team All-AAC (2024); Joe Moore Award (2024) (Note: Awarded collectively to Army's entire offensive line)
- Stats at Pro Football Reference

Lucas Scott (born August 25, 2003) is an American professional football fullback for the Baltimore Ravens of the National Football League (NFL). He played college football for the Army Black Knights. Scott signed with the Ravens as an undrafted free agent following the 2025 NFL Draft.

== Early life ==
Scott was born in Binghamton, New York on August 25, 2003. He attended high school in Chenango Forks, New York, where he holds multiple school records and helped the team to win a state championship in 2019. Along with football, he also wrestled and played lacrosse. He committed to Army, deciding to play football there instead of wrestle at a better school.

== College career ==
In 2023, Scott played in all 12 games and started the final 11 of them at right guard. In 2024, he played and started at right tackle in all 14 games. He, along with the rest of the offensive line, aided quarterback Bryson Daily to his 1,659 rushing yards and NCAA-leading 32 rushing touchdowns. Following the season, he was named Second-team All-AAC. Furthermore, he was part of the offensive line that won the Joe Moore Award for 2024.

== Professional career ==
=== Pre-draft ===
During the initial pre-draft process, Scott believed that most NFL teams viewed him as a center, but prior to Scott's Pro Day, then-Ravens offensive coordinator Todd Monken, the cousin of Army head coach Jeff Monken who Scott played for in college, asked him to run routes. He had also previously commented that he enjoyed watching Patrick Ricard play for the Ravens and that he wouldn't mind following in his path.

Pre-draft measurables
Height	Weight	Arm length	Hand span	Wingspan	40-yard dash	10-yard split	20-yard split	20-yard shuttle	Three-cone drill	Vertical jump	Broad jump	Bench press
6 ft 3 1/2 in (1.92 m)	278 lb (126 kg)	31 1/2 in (0.80 m)	9 7/8 in (0.25 m)	6 ft 4 3/8 in (1.94 m)	5.26 s	1.75 s	2.99 s	4.68 s	8.01 s	23.0 in (0.58 m)	8 ft 0 in (2.44 m)	19 reps
All values from Pro Day

=== Baltimore Ravens ===
Scott went undrafted in the 2025 NFL draft. He accepted an invitation from both the New York Giants and Baltimore Ravens to their respective rookie minicamps. He signed with the Ravens as a fullback on May 12, 2025, on a 3-year deal worth $2.965 million. He saw playing time in the preseason as Ricard sat out, but was nonetheless waived on August 26. He signed to the practice squad on August 28.

On January 6, 2026, Scott signed a reserve/future contract with the Ravens. He was waived by Baltimore on August 30 as part of final roster cuts. On October 7, Scott was signed to the practice squad. He was released on November 2. On November 10, Scott was re-signed to the practice squad.
