= Devin Culp =

American football player (born 2000)

No. 83 – Minnesota Vikings
- Position: Tight end
- Roster status: Practice squad

Personal information
- Born: February 2, 2000 (age 26); Spokane, Washington, U.S.
- Listed height: 6 ft 4 in (1.93 m)
- Listed weight: 237 lb (108 kg)

Career information
- High school: Gonzaga Preparatory (Spokane)
- College: Washington (2018–2023)
- NFL draft: 2024: 7th round, 246th overall pick

Career history
- Tampa Bay Buccaneers (2024–2025); Cleveland Browns (2026)*; Minnesota Vikings (2026–present)
- * Offseason or practice squad member only

Career NFL statistics as of Week 10, 2026
- Receptions: 6
- Receiving yards: 94
- Receiving touchdowns: 1
- Stats at Pro Football Reference

Devin Culp (born February 2, 2000) is an American professional football tight end for the Minnesota Vikings of the National Football League (NFL). He played college football for the Washington Huskies and was selected by the Buccaneers in the seventh round of the 2024 NFL draft.

== Early life ==
From Spokane, Washington, Culp attended Gonzaga Preparatory School where he played football and basketball. He became a starter on the basketball team as a freshman and also saw significant playing time on the football team at Gonzaga as a wide receiver. In football, Culp was a first-team all-state selection, and he helped Gonzaga reach the quarterfinals of the state playoffs as a senior. He committed to play college football for the Washington Huskies, after having flipped from the Oregon Ducks.

== College career ==
Culp became a tight end and redshirted as a true freshman at Washington in 2018. He appeared in 14 of the team's 17 games in the 2019 and 2020 seasons but saw limited playing time, only making a single reception. He had a breakout season in 2021, recording 20 catches for 222 yards and one touchdown. In 2022, he recorded 29 receptions for 266 yards and a touchdown. He returned for a final season in 2023 and caught 16 passes for 208 yards and two scores, named honorable mention All-Pac-12 Conference and College sports communicators (CSC) academic all district team while helping Washington reach the national championship.

== Professional career ==
Pre-draft measurables
Height	Weight	Arm length	Hand span	Wingspan	40-yard dash	10-yard split	20-yard split	20-yard shuttle	Three-cone drill	Vertical jump	Broad jump
6 ft 3 1/8 in (1.91 m)	231 lb (105 kg)	32 7/8 in (0.84 m)	9 1/4 in (0.23 m)	6 ft 6 1/2 in (1.99 m)	4.47 s	1.55 s	2.60 s	4.31 s	7.28 s	35.0 in (0.89 m)	9 ft 10 in (3.00 m)
All values from NFL Combine/Pro Day

=== Tampa Bay Buccaneers ===
Culp was invited to the NFL Scouting Combine in 2024, where he ran the fourth-fastest 40-yard dash by a tight end since 2003. He was selected by the Tampa Bay Buccaneers in the seventh round (246th overall) of the 2024 NFL draft. On August 27, 2024, it was announced that Culp had made the team's 53-man roster. He joined former University of Washington Huskies: Greg Gaines, Vita Vea, Joe Tyron-Shoyinka, Cade Otton, and Jalen Mcmillan on the roster.

In Week 15 of the 2025 season, during a 29–28 loss to the Atlanta Falcons, Culp recorded his first career touchdown on a six–yard reception from Baker Mayfield.

On August 30, 2026, Culp was waived by the Buccaneers as a part of final roster cuts; he was re-signed to the team's practice squad the following day. Culp was released by the Buccaneers on September 2.

=== Cleveland Browns ===
On October 13, 2026, Culp signed with the Cleveland Browns practice squad. On October 20, he was released.

=== Minnesota Vikings ===
On October 28, 2026, Culp signed with the Minnesota Vikings practice squad.
