= Troy Fautanu =

American football player (born 2000)

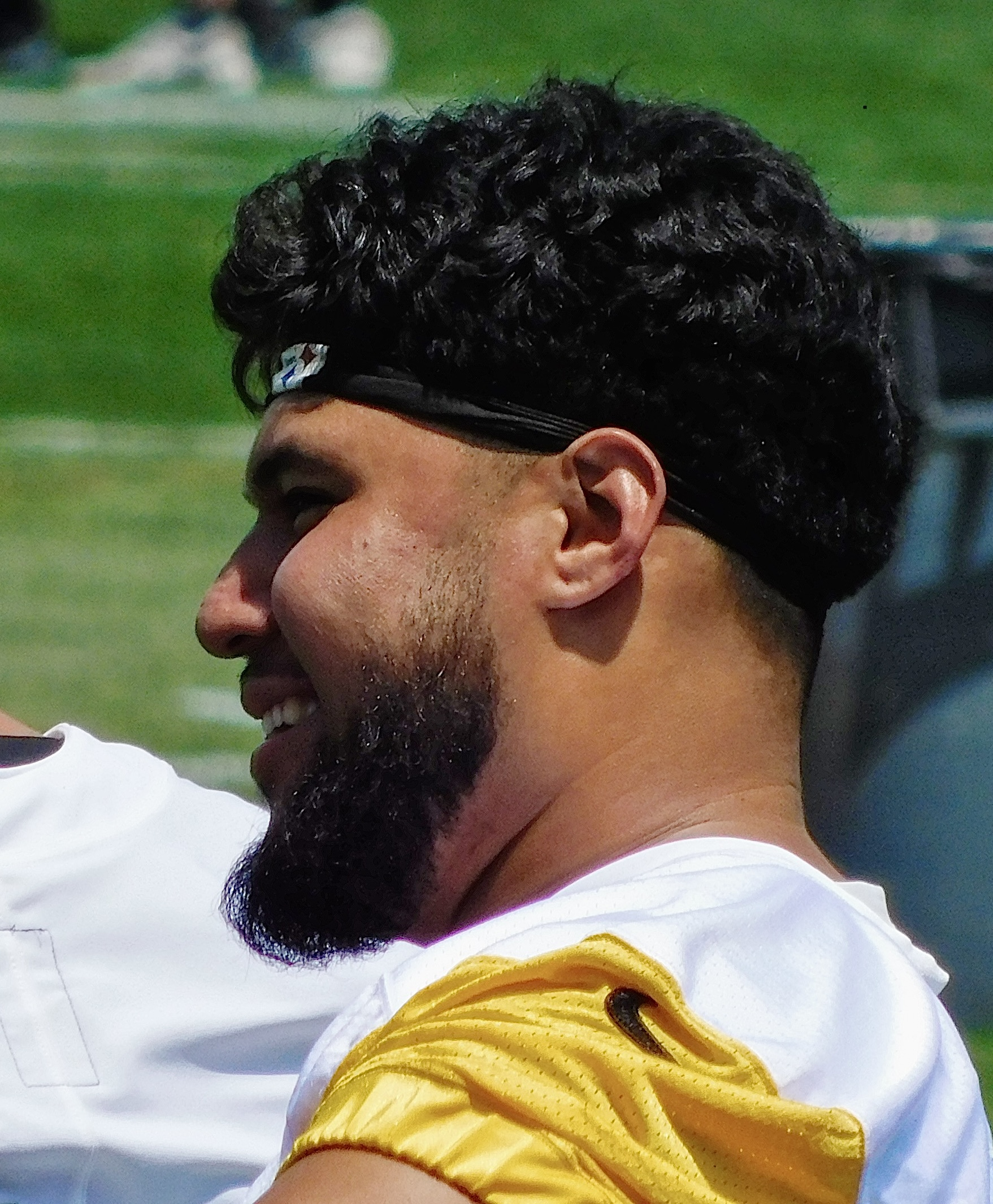
- Fautanu with the Pittsburgh Steelers in 2025

No. 76 – Pittsburgh Steelers
- Position: Offensive tackle
- Roster status: Active

Personal information
- Born: October 11, 2000 (age 26); Henderson, Nevada, U.S.
- Listed height: 6 ft 4 in (1.93 m)
- Listed weight: 317 lb (144 kg)

Career information
- High school: Liberty (Henderson)
- College: Washington (2019–2023)
- NFL draft: 2024: 1st round, 20th overall pick

Career history
- Pittsburgh Steelers (2024–present)

Awards and highlights
- Morris Trophy (2023); First-team All-Pac-12 (2023); Second-team All-Pac-12 (2022)

Career NFL statistics as of 2025
- Games played: 18
- Games started: 18
- Stats at Pro Football Reference

Troy Fautanu (born October 11, 2000) is an American professional football offensive tackle for the Pittsburgh Steelers of the National Football League (NFL). He played college football for the Washington Huskies and won the 2023 Morris Trophy. Fautanu was selected by the Steelers in the first round of the 2024 NFL draft.

== Early life ==
Fautanu was born on October 11, 2000, in Henderson, Nevada. Coming out of high school, Fautanu was a three-star prospect and was rated as the 59th offensive tackle in the country. Fautanu committed to play college football for the Washington Huskies. Growing up, Fautanu was a fan of the Pittsburgh Steelers.

== College career ==
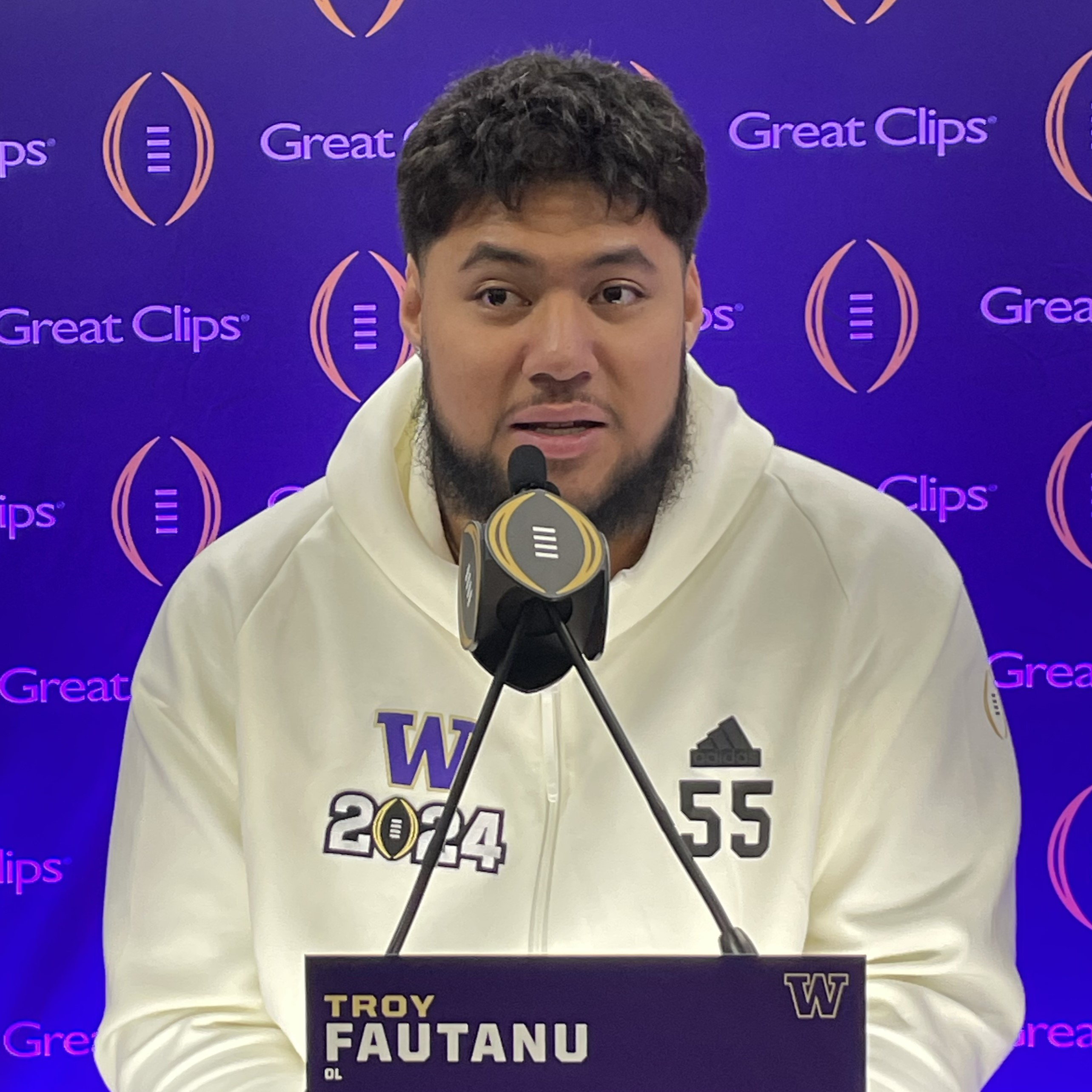
Fautanu in January 2024

In Fautanu's first season in 2019 he redshirted and did not appear in any games. During the 2020 season, Fautanu appeared in four games. During the 2021 season, Fautanu would play in nine games, starting in three of them.

Fautanu had a breakout 2022 season, where he started all 13 games. In week three of the 2022 season versus Michigan State, Fautanu was named the Pac-12 offensive lineman of the week. For his performance in the season, Fautanu was named second-team all Pac-12.

In the 2023 season, he won the Morris Trophy as the top offensive lineman in the Pac-12 and the Joe Moore Award as the top offensive line unit. He also earned first-team All Pac-12 honors this same season. Fautanu and the Huskies advanced to the National Championship, in which they lost to the Michigan Wolverines 34-13. Following the season, he declared for the 2024 NFL draft.

== Professional career ==
Pre-draft measurables
Height	Weight	Arm length	Hand span	Wingspan	40-yard dash	10-yard split	20-yard split	Vertical jump	Broad jump	Bench press
6 ft 3 3/4 in (1.92 m)	317 lb (144 kg)	34 1/2 in (0.88 m)	9 1/2 in (0.24 m)	6 ft 9 1/2 in (2.07 m)	5.01 s	1.71 s	2.88 s	32.5 in (0.83 m)	9 ft 5 in (2.87 m)	29 reps
All values from NFL Combine/Pro Day

=== 2024 season ===
Fautanu was selected by the Pittsburgh Steelers in the first round with the 20th overall pick in the 2024 NFL draft. He signed his four year rookie deal on June 3, 2024.

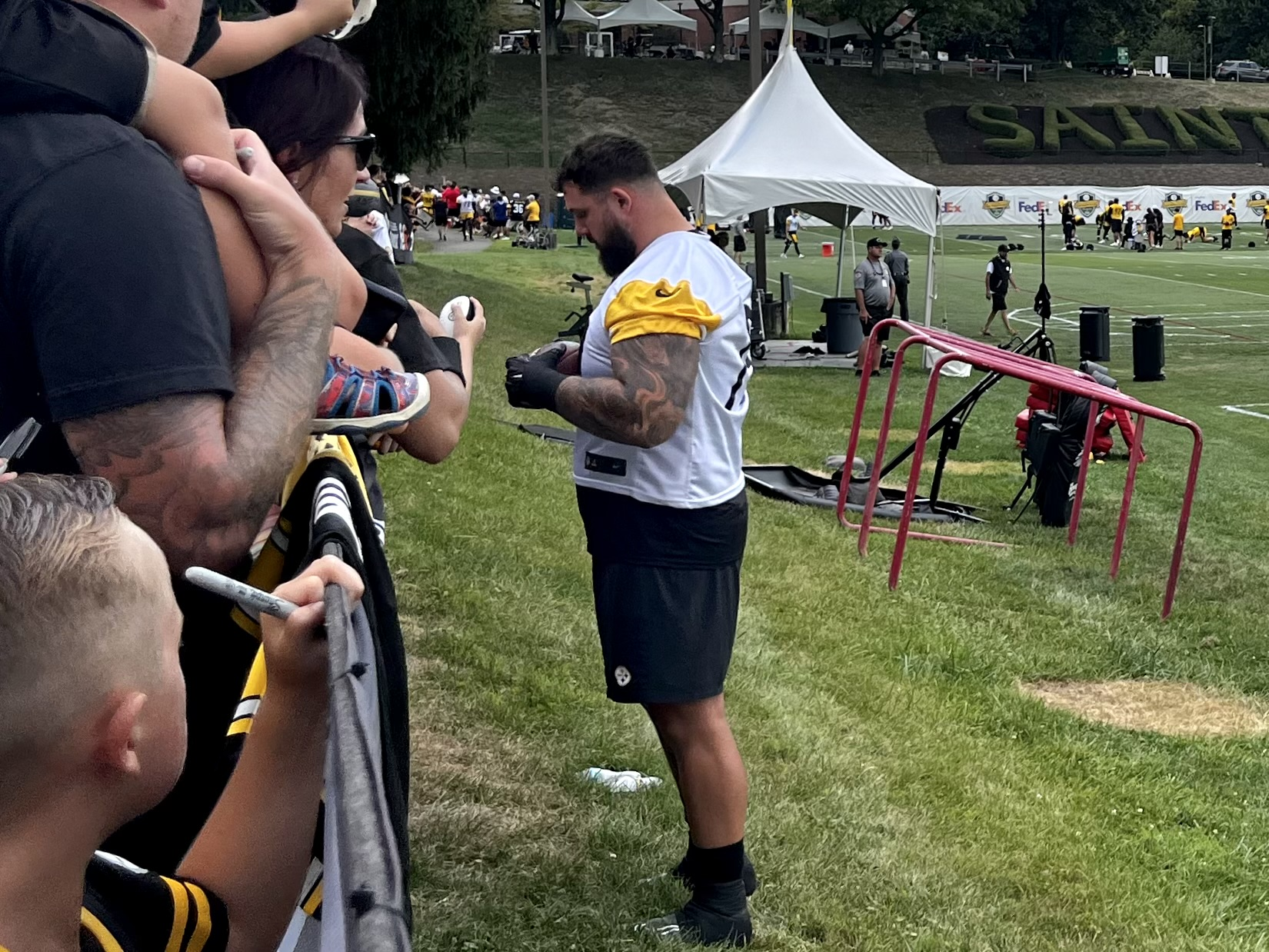
Fautanu signing autographs during Steelers training camp in 2024

During the Steelers' preseason game against the Houston Texans, Fautanu sustained a knee injury, causing him to miss the remainder of the team's preseason. He would not appear in week 1, however, he would earn his first professional start the following week in a 13-6 victory over the Denver Broncos. In his first start he allowed no sacks, committed no penalties and allowed no pressures as he played for 55 offensive snaps.

On September 20, Fautanu left the Steelers' practice with an injury that required him to undergo an MRI. He was relieved by Broderick Jones at the right tackle position for the remainder of the practice ahead of the team's week 3 game against the Los Angeles Chargers. On September 21, Fautanu was placed on the Steelers' injured reserve list, making him ineligible to play for four weeks. He was officially listed as inactive prior to the Steelers week 4 loss to the Indianapolis Colts. It was revealed on September 23 that Fautanu had dislocated his kneecap, officially ending his rookie season.

In total, Fautanu played in just one game as a rookie. Overall, Fautanu earned a PFF grade of 64.4 with a pass blocking grade of 63.9 and a run blocking grade of 59.3. Despite his shortened season, he still placed 56 out of 133 eligible offensive tackles in the league for his performance.

=== 2025 season ===
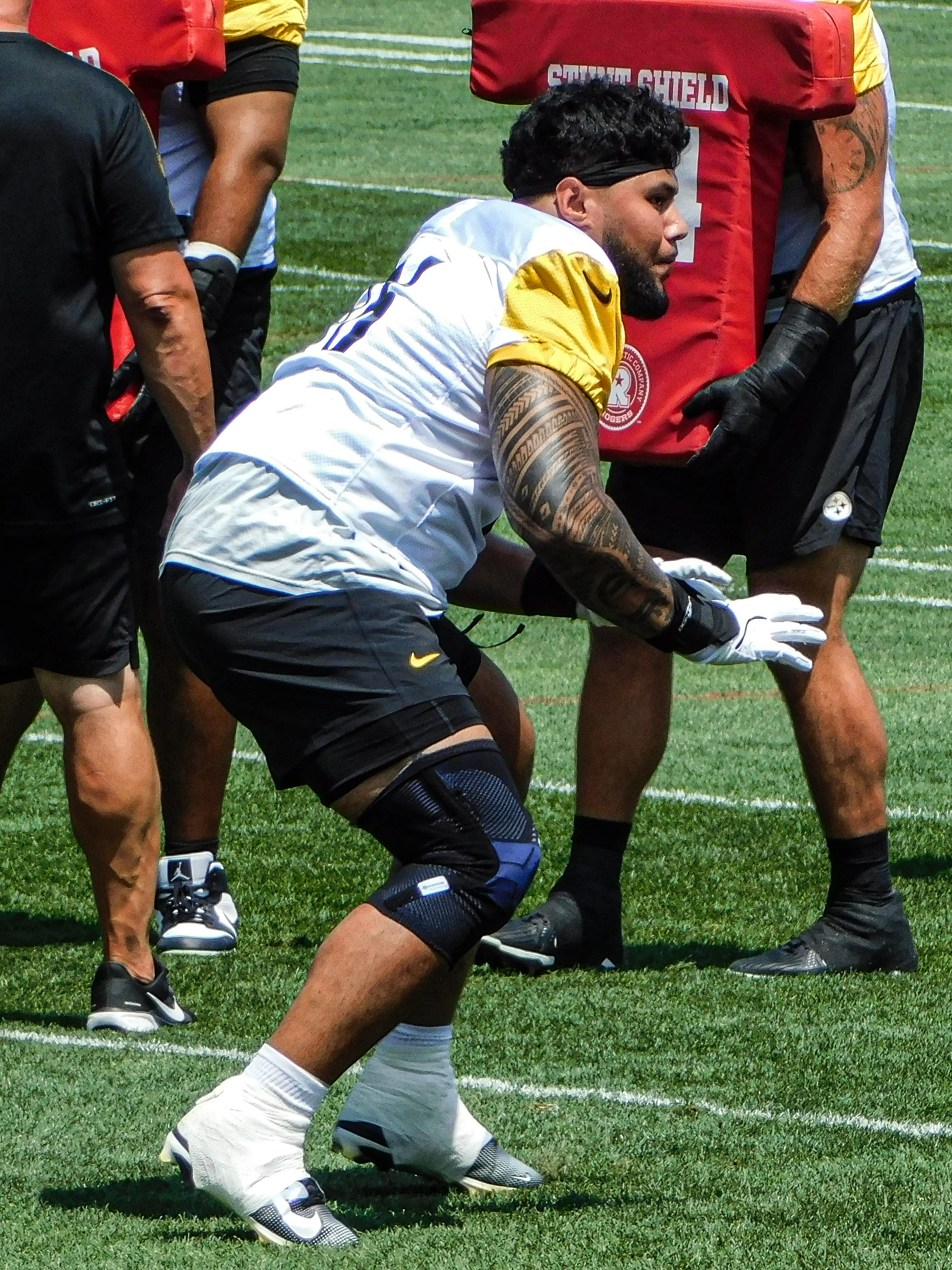
Fauntanu during a practice drill in 2025

With the release of the Steelers' official depth chart, Fautanu was named the team's starting right tackle for the 2025 season.

Fautanu made his first start of the season, as well as his second professional start overall, in the Steelers' Week 1 34–32 win over the New York Jets. Up through Pittsburgh's Week 5 bye, Fautanu played 225 offensive snaps, accounting for 100% of the team's offensive plays across all four of their games to being the season. He allowed zero sacks through these games and only allowed six quarterback pressures. During a home victory over the Indianapolis Colts, Fautanu made his first professional pancake block on defensive tackle Deforest Buckner.

== Personal life ==
Fautanu is a Christian. He has been in a relationship with Carys Zayda, a nursing student at Nevada State University, since August 2018. They became engaged in July 2026.

Fautanu developed an early connection to football through his admiration for Troy Polamalu, whose style of play and attitude toward the game shaped his understanding of the Pittsburgh Steelers’ identity. He described being inspired by the team’s gritty, hard-working culture and tried to incorporate those values into his own approach to football. Fautanu’s connection to the Steelers began when he was a child, long before joining the team. After years of admiring their culture from afar, he expressed excitement about becoming part of it and learning from the veteran players as he began his professional career.
