= Kamren Fabiculanan =

American football player

No. 13 – Washington Huskies
- Position: Safety
- Class: Senior

Personal information
- Listed height: 6 ft 1 in (1.85 m)
- Listed weight: 190 lb (86 kg)

Career information
- High school: Westlake (Thousand Oaks, California)
- College: Washington (2019–present)
- Stats at ESPN

Kamren Fabiculanan is an American college football safety for the Washington Huskies.

== Early life ==
A native of Camarillo, California, Fabiculanan played baseball and soccer in his youth before ultimately choosing to focus on football. He initially attended St. Bonaventure High School in Ventura, California, before transferring to Westlake High School in Thousand Oaks, California. Rated as a three-star recruit, Fabiculanan committed to play college football for the Washington Huskies.

== College football career ==
After redshirting his freshman season in 2019, Fabiculanan appeared in just one game in 2020, recording four tackles. In 2021, he totaled seven tackles, including one and a half tackles for a loss. During the 2022 season, Fabiculanan tallied 38 tackles, three pass deflections, and a fumble recovery. He recorded his first career interception in the 2023 season opener, a win over Boise State, and added another the following week in a victory over Tulsa. In the 2024 CFP Championship game, Fabiculanan recorded a tackle during the loss to Michigan. He finished the 2023 season with 26 tackles, three of which were for a loss, along with two pass deflections and two interceptions. He was voted captain for the 2024 season and started all 13 games.

== Professional career ==
Pre-draft measurables
| Height | Weight | Arm length | Hand span | 40-yard dash | 10-yard split | 20-yard split | 20-yard shuttle | Three-cone drill | Vertical jump | Broad jump | Bench press |
|---|---|---|---|---|---|---|---|---|---|---|---|
| 6 ft 1 1/4 in (1.86 m) | 190 lb (86 kg) | 30 1/4 in (0.77 m) | 9 1/8 in (0.23 m) | 4.80 s | 1.66 s | 2.80 s | 4.40 s | 7.09 s | 29.5 in (0.75 m) | 9 ft 1 in (2.77 m) | 11 reps |
All values from Pro Day

== Personal life ==
Fabiculanan is of Filipino descent, born to parents from the Philippines. His father, Alex, was born in Manila, while his mother, Kathy, is from Paoay. Both Alex and Kathy grew up in Southern California, where they were multi-sport athletes at Channel Islands High School.

Fabiculanan has three siblings: two brothers and one sister.
