= Roger Rosengarten =

American football player (born 2002)

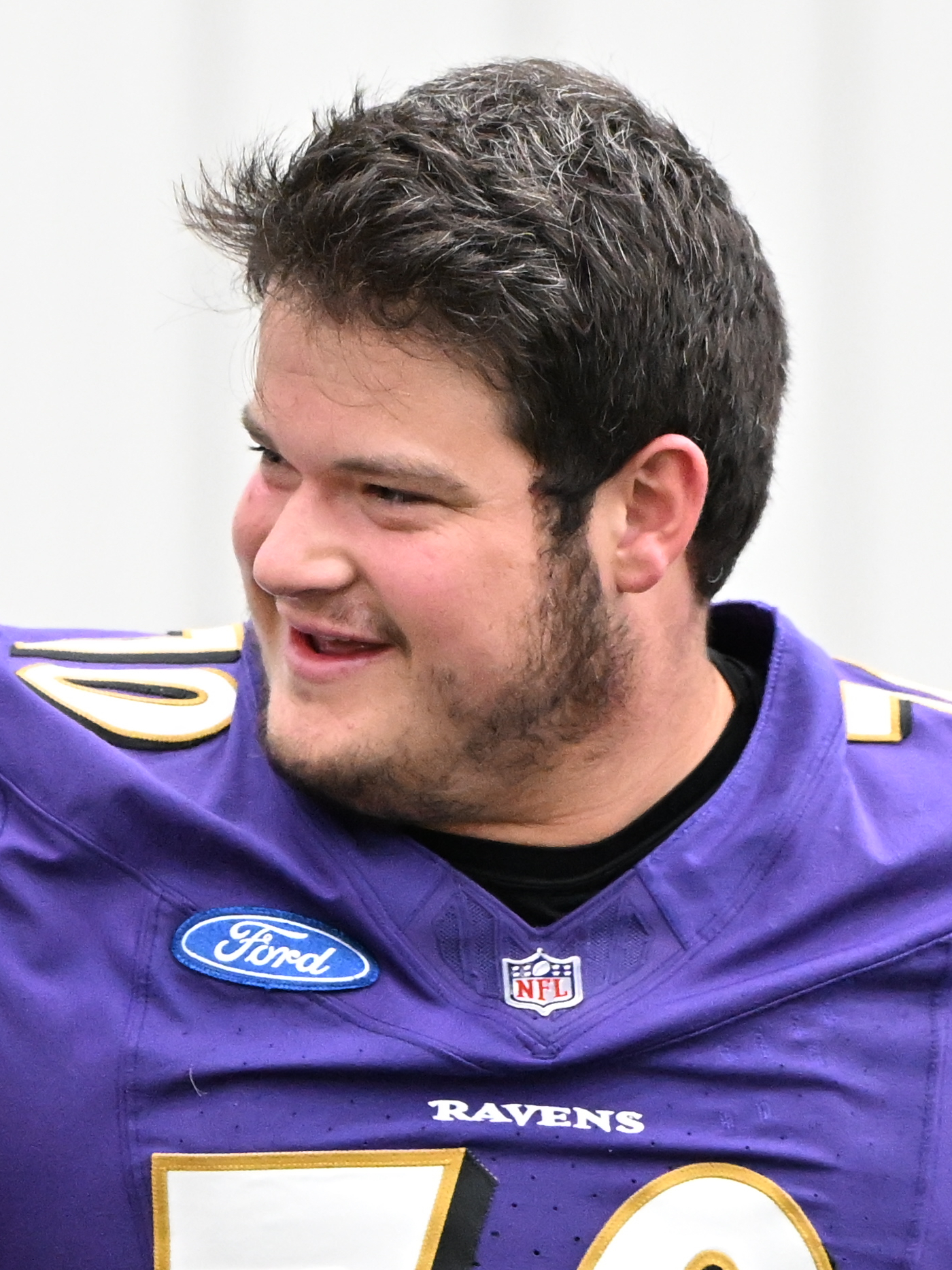
- Rosengarten with the Baltimore Ravens in 2024

No. 70 – Baltimore Ravens
- Position: Offensive tackle
- Roster status: Active

Personal information
- Born: June 3, 2002 (age 24); Highlands Ranch, Colorado, U.S.
- Listed height: 6 ft 5 in (1.96 m)
- Listed weight: 310 lb (141 kg)

Career information
- High school: Valor Christian (Highlands Ranch)
- College: Washington (2020–2023)
- NFL draft: 2024: 2nd round, 62nd overall pick

Career history
- Baltimore Ravens (2024–present)

Awards and highlights
- PFWA All-Rookie Team (2024)

Career NFL statistics as of 2025
- Games played: 34
- Games started: 31
- Stats at Pro Football Reference

Roger Rosengarten (born June 3, 2002) is an American professional football offensive tackle for the Baltimore Ravens of the National Football League (NFL). He played college football for the Washington Huskies.

== Early life ==
Rosengarten was born to Catholic parents and attended high school at Valor Christian. In the 2018 Colorado State Championship, Rosengarten intercepted a pass to help seal a state title for his team. In Rosengarten's high school career he won two state titles in 2016 and 2018. Coming out of high school, Rosengarten was rated as a four star recruit, and the number eleven tackle in the class of 2020. Rosengarten decided to commit to play college football for the Washington Huskies.

== College career ==
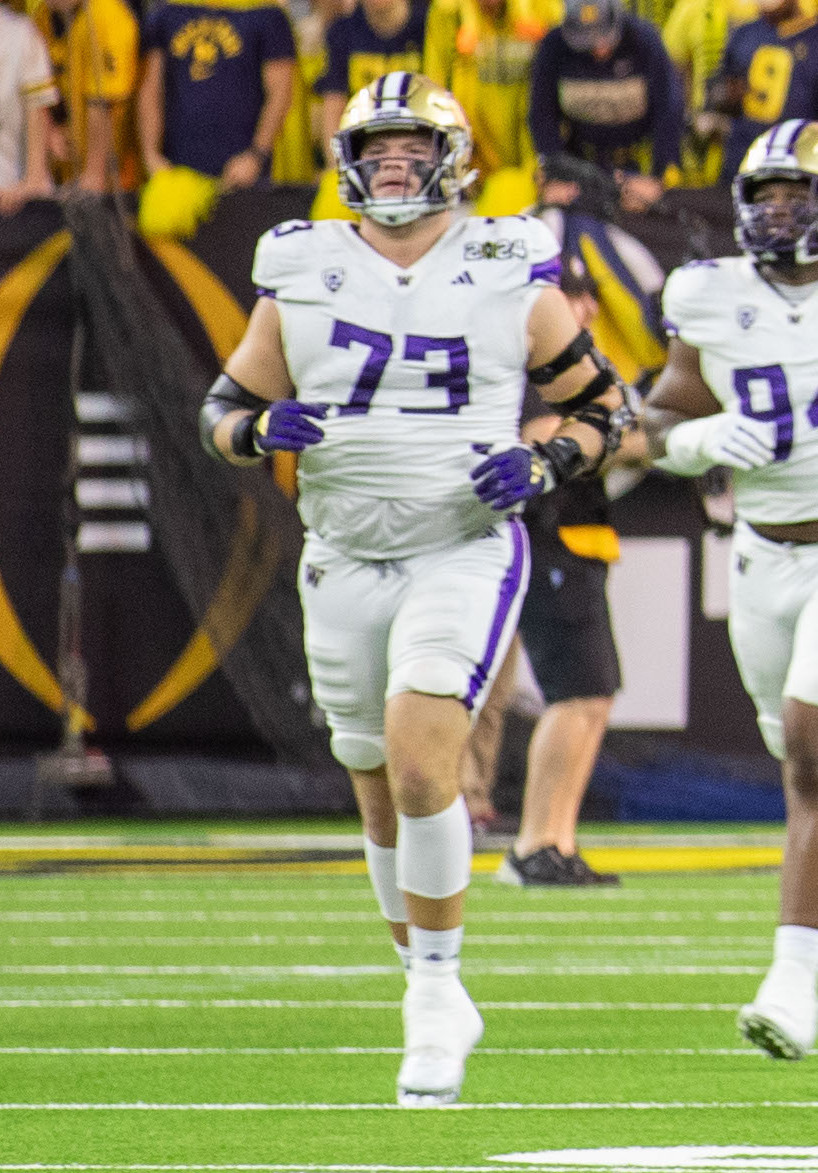
Rosengarten at the 2024 College Football Playoff National Championship

In Rosengarten's first two seasons in 2020 and 2021 he played in a combined five games with no starts. In the 2022 season, Rosengarten played in and started all 13 games for the Huskies at right tackle. For his performance on the 2022 season, Rosengarten was named First Team Freshman All-American. During the 2023 season, Rosengarten was a part of the Huskies' Joe Moore Award-winning offensive line, which is awarded to the nation's best offensive line. After the conclusion of the 2023 season, Rosengarten decided to declare for the 2024 NFL draft.

== Professional career ==
Pre-draft measurables
Height	Weight	Arm length	Hand span	Wingspan	40-yard dash	10-yard split	20-yard split	20-yard shuttle	Vertical jump	Broad jump	Bench press
6 ft 5 3/8 in (1.97 m)	308 lb (140 kg)	33 1/2 in (0.85 m)	9 5/8 in (0.24 m)	6 ft 8 3/8 in (2.04 m)	4.92 s	1.73 s	2.86 s	4.60 s	30.0 in (0.76 m)	9 ft 5 in (2.87 m)	20 reps
All values from NFL Combine/Pro Day

Rosengarten was selected by the Baltimore Ravens in the second round of the 2024 NFL draft with the 62nd overall pick. He made his NFL debut in a Week 1 road loss to the Kansas City Chiefs, and made his first career start in a Week 4 win at home against the Buffalo Bills. He appeared in all 17 regular season games with 14 starts in his rookie season. Rosengarten was named to the PFWA All-Rookie Team for his efforts.
