= Nate Kalepo =

American football player (born 2001)

Profile
- Position: Offensive guard

Personal information
- Born: August 5, 2001 (age 25)
- Listed height: 6 ft 6 in (1.98 m)
- Listed weight: 325 lb (147 kg)

Career information
- High school: Rainier Beach (Seattle, Washington)
- College: Washington (2019–2023); Ole Miss (2024)
- NFL draft: 2025: undrafted

Career history
- Tampa Bay Buccaneers (2025)*
- * Offseason or practice squad member only

Nate Kalepo (born August 5, 2001) is an American football offensive guard. He previously played for the Washington Huskies and the Ole Miss Rebels.

== Early life ==
Kalepo grew up in Renton, Washington and attended Rainier Beach High School. He was rated as a four-star recruit and committed to play college football for the Washington Huskies over offers from schools such as Oregon, UCLA, and USC.

== College career ==
=== Washington ===
As a freshman in 2020, Kalepo appeared in two games for the Huskies. In 2021, he played in 11 games. Kalepo made his first career start in the 2022 season opener against Kent State. In the 2022 season, he played in 12 games while making three starts. Kalepo opened the 2023 season as a starter for the Huskies. He started in both of the Huskies playoff games including the national championship where he allowed no pressures or sacks against Michigan. Kalepo was part of a Huskies offensive line which won the Joe Moore Award, given to the nation's best offensive line. In 2023, he started all 15 games for Washington. After the season, Kalepo entered the NCAA transfer portal.

In Kalepo's Husky career, he played in 40 games where he started in 18 of them.

=== Ole Miss ===
Kalepo transferred to play for the Ole Miss Rebels. Following the season, Kalepo declared for the NFL Draft.

== Professional career ==
After going undrafted, Kalepo agreed to a Rookie Minicamp deal with the Tampa Bay Buccaneers.
