= Michael Penix Jr. =

American football player (born 2000)

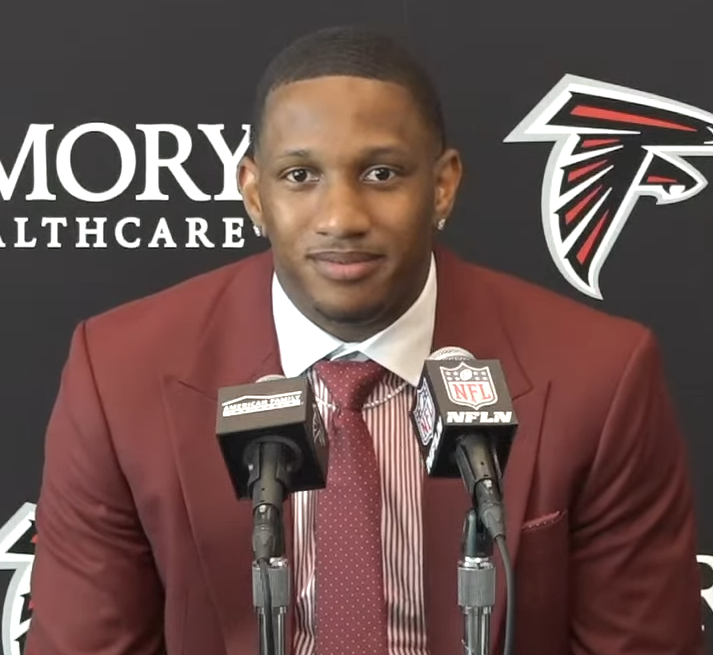
- Penix with the Atlanta Falcons in 2024

No. 9 – Atlanta Falcons
- Position: Quarterback
- Roster status: Active

Personal information
- Born: May 8, 2000 (age 26); Cookeville, Tennessee, U.S.
- Listed height: 6 ft 3 in (1.91 m)
- Listed weight: 220 lb (100 kg)

Career information
- High school: Tampa Bay Technical (Tampa, Florida)
- College: Indiana (2018–2021); Washington (2022–2023)
- NFL draft: 2024: 1st round, 8th overall pick

Career history
- Atlanta Falcons (2024–present)

Awards and highlights
- Maxwell Award (2023); AP Comeback Player of the Year (2022); First-team All-American (2023); NCAA passing yards leader (2023); 2× Second-team All-Pac-12 (2022, 2023); Second-team All-Big Ten (2020)

Career NFL statistics as of Week 10, 2026
- Passing attempts: 623
- Passing completions: 374
- Completion percentage: 60.0%
- TD–INT: 22–13
- Passing yards: 4,487
- Passer rating: 85.2
- Stats at Pro Football Reference

Michael Tarrence Penix Jr. (/ˈpɛnɪks/ PENN-iks; born May 8, 2000) is an American professional football quarterback for the Atlanta Falcons of the National Football League (NFL). After three seasons of college football with the Indiana Hoosiers that were limited by injury, Penix had a breakout year with the Washington Huskies in 2022 when he led the FBS in yards per game and set the school season record for passing yards. The following year, he won the Maxwell Award after leading the NCAA in passing yards en route to an appearance in the 2024 College Football Playoff National Championship. Penix was selected by the Falcons eighth overall in the 2024 NFL draft.

== Early life ==
Penix was born in Cookeville, Tennessee, but later moved and was raised in Dade City, Florida. Penix attended Tampa Bay Technical High School and started at quarterback for the Titans for two seasons, passing for 4,243 yards with 61 touchdowns and only six interceptions. He committed to Indiana University to play college football, as a 3-star recruit according to 247 sports.

== College career ==
=== Indiana ===
As a true freshman for the Hoosiers in 2018 at Indiana, Penix played in three games, suffered a torn anterior cruciate ligament (ACL), and was redshirted. He completed 21 of 34 passes for 219 yards and a touchdown. Named the starter entering the 2019 season, Penix, however, only played in six games due to injury, completing 110 of 160 passes for 1,394 yards, with ten touchdowns and four interceptions. Penix returned to Indiana as the starter for the pandemic-shortened season in 2020. In the first game of the season, Penix scored the game winning two-point conversion to give Indiana a 36-35 victory over Penn State. On November 30, he was ruled out for the season after suffering a torn ACL in a win against Maryland.

=== Washington ===
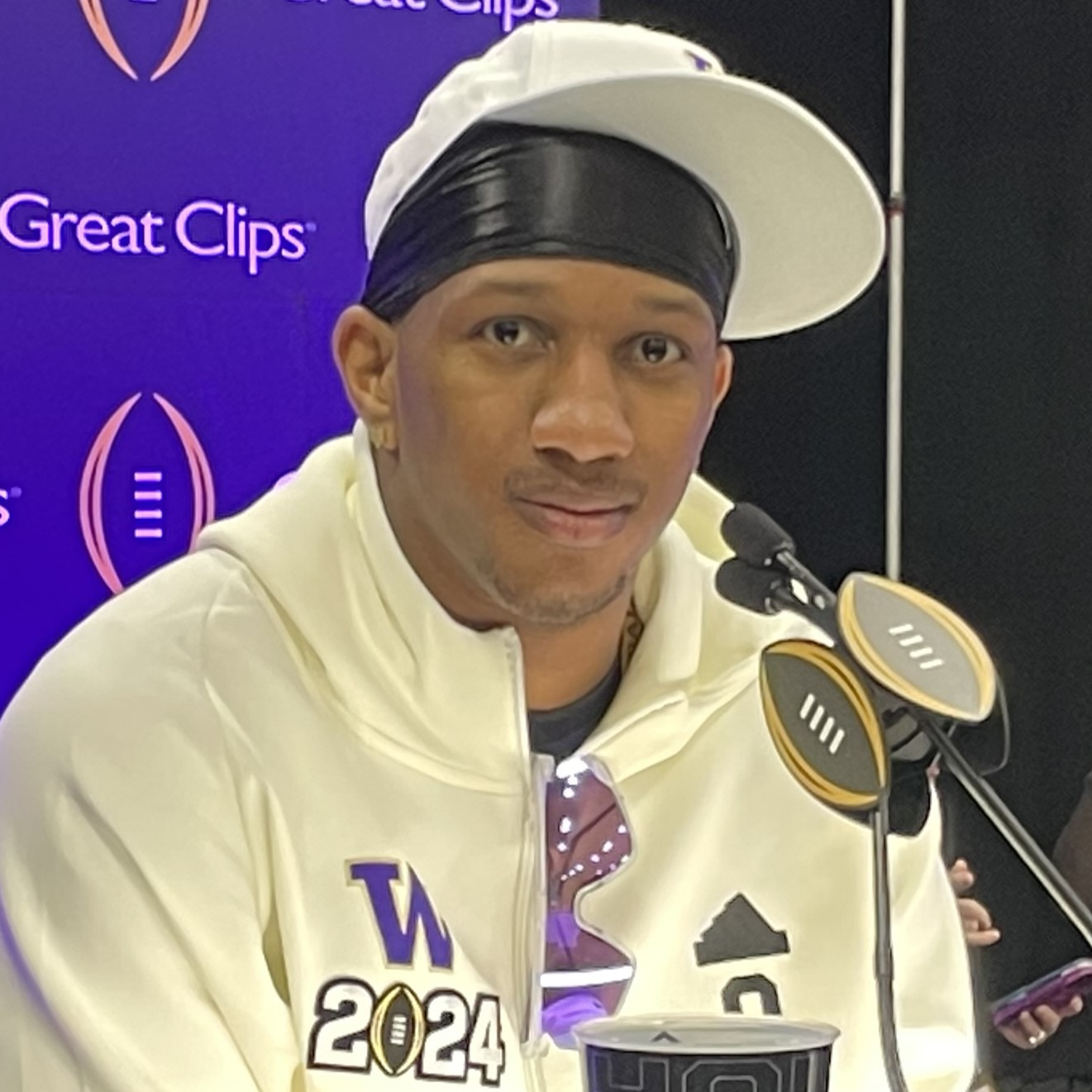
Penix at a press conference prior to the 2024 College Football Playoff National Championship

Penix transferred to the University of Washington in December 2021. He was the FBS leader in passing yards per game for the 2022 season (357) and led the Huskies to an 11–2 record. He threw 4,641 passing yards, becoming the Washington Huskies all-time single-season passing leader during the Alamo Bowl. He was named AP Comeback Player of the Year.

In his senior year, Penix led the 2023 Huskies to an undefeated 13-0 regular season, a victory over Texas in the CFP Semifinal Game, and the 2024 College Football Playoff National Championship game, which they lost 34–13 to Michigan. Penix won the Maxwell Award and finished second in the Heisman Trophy voting, the highest ever for a Husky. He led the NCAA in passing yards with 4,903, beating his previously set University of Washington single-season passing yards record. Penix was named MVP of the Pac-12 Championship Game, leading UW to a win over rival No. 5 Oregon, and threw for 27-for-39 for 319 yards, one touchdown and one interception.

=== College statistics ===
Legend
	Led the NCAA
**Bold**	Career high

Season	Team	Games			Passing								Rushing			
Season	Team	GP	GS	Record	Cmp	Att	Pct	Yds	Avg	TD	Int	Rtg	Att	Yds	Avg	TD
2018	Indiana	3	0	0–0	21	34	61.8	219	6.4	1	0	125.6	7	45	**6.4**	0
2019	Indiana	6	6	5–1	110	160	**68.8**	1,394	8.7	10	4	**157.6**	22	**119**	5.4	2
2020	Indiana	6	6	5–1	124	220	56.4	1,645	7.5	14	4	136.5	18	25	1.4	2
2021	Indiana	5	5	2–3	87	162	53.7	939	5.8	4	7	101.9	17	−24	−1.4	2
2022	Washington	13	13	11–2	362	554	65.3	4,641	8.4	31	8	151.3	**35**	92	2.6	**4**
2023	Washington	15	15	**14–1**	**363**	**555**	65.4	**4,903**	**8.8**	**36**	**11**	157.1	**35**	8	0.2	3
Career		48	45	37–8	1,067	1,685	63.3	13,741	8.2	96	34	146.6	134	265	2.0	13

== Professional career ==
Pre-draft measurables
Height	Weight	Arm length	Hand span	Wingspan	40-yard dash	10-yard split	20-yard split	Vertical jump	Broad jump
6 ft 2 1/4 in (1.89 m)	216 lb (98 kg)	33 5/8 in (0.85 m)	10 1/2 in (0.27 m)	6 ft 9 in (2.06 m)	4.58 s	1.58 s	2.61 s	36.5 in (0.93 m)	10 ft 5 in (3.18 m)
All values from NFL Combine/Pro Day

=== 2024 season ===
Penix was selected by the Atlanta Falcons as the eighth overall pick in the 2024 NFL draft. The pick was seen as a major surprise because the Falcons had signed Kirk Cousins to a four-year, $180 million contract earlier in the offseason. He was the fourth of six quarterbacks taken in the first round, tied with the 1983 draft for the most in NFL history. Penix signed a four-year fully-guaranteed contract worth $22.8 million on June 24, 2024.

Penix began his rookie season as a backup to veteran quarterback Kirk Cousins. On October 20, Penix made his NFL debut late in the fourth quarter during the Falcons' blowout loss to the Seattle Seahawks, completing his lone pass for 14 yards to Casey Washington. Following poor play from Cousins, the Falcons announced on December 17 that Penix would replace Cousins as the starting quarterback, beginning with their week 16 matchup against the New York Giants. In his first career start, Penix completed 18-of-27 passes for 202 yards, including one interception after a bobbled pass by Kyle Pitts, as the Falcons routed the Giants 34–7. In week 17, on Sunday Night Football, against the Washington Commanders Penix completed his first touchdown pass, to Kyle Pitts, to tie the game with 1:19 left in the fourth quarter. He finished 19 of 35 passes, for 223 yards with one touchdown pass and one interception. The game went into overtime, and eventually the Commanders won 30–24. The game was the first time in NFL history that two rookie quarterbacks selected in the first round faced off against each other in a prime-time game, as Penix faced off against rookie Jayden Daniels. This loss would eventually eliminate the Falcons from Playoff contention, following a win the following week by the Tampa Bay Buccaneers.

=== 2025 season ===
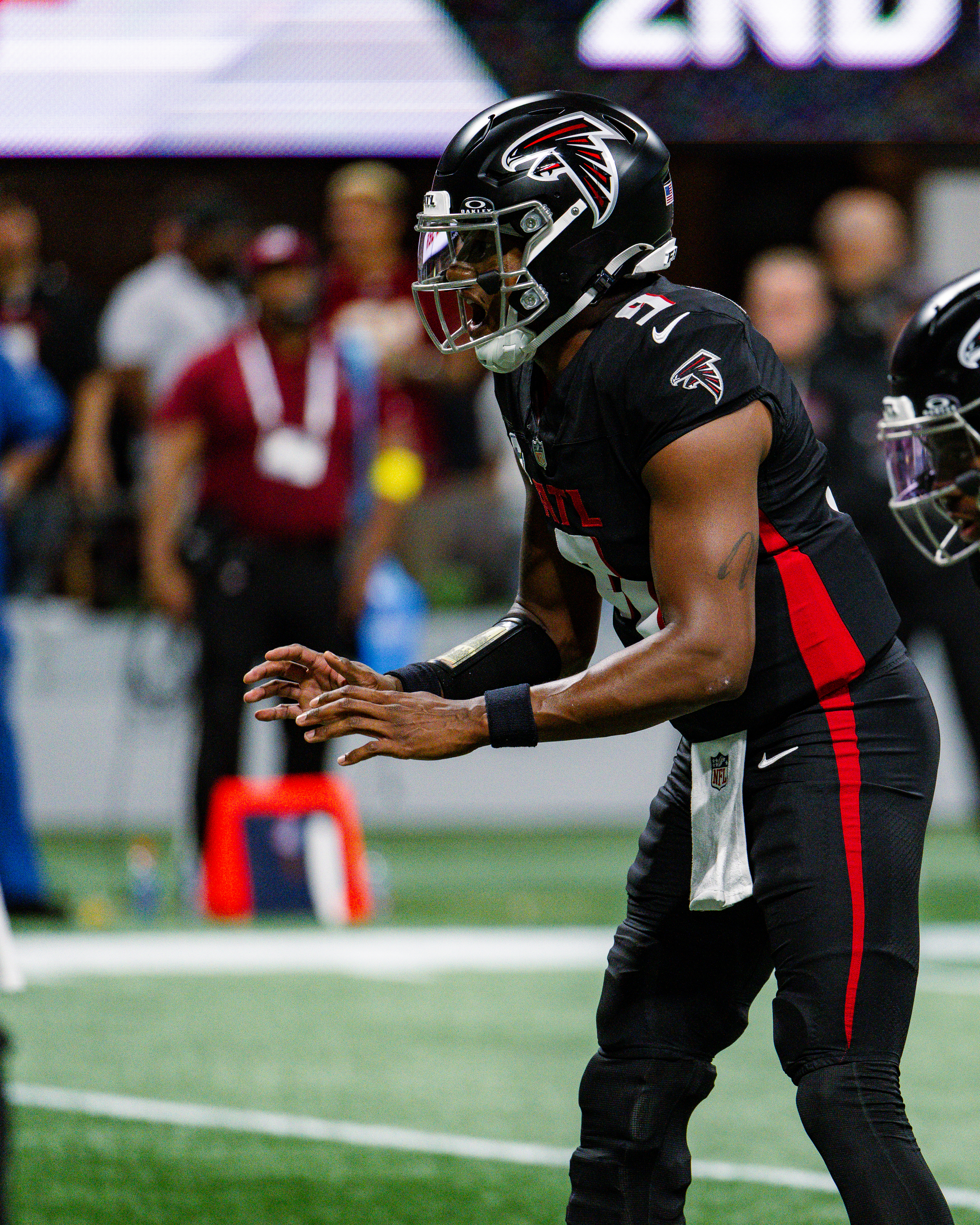
Penix with the Atlanta Falcons in 2025

Prior to the season, it was confirmed that Penix would continue as Atlanta's starting quarterback, making Cousins his backup. In the 30–0 loss to the Carolina Panthers in Week 3, he was benched for Cousins in the fourth quarter with roughly ten minutes remaining after recording 18 passes for 172 yards and two interceptions (with one returned for a touchdown). In Week 11 against the Panthers, Penix exited the game with a left knee injury in the third quarter. On November 17, he was placed on injured reserve. On November 19, the Falcons announced that Penix would undergo season-ending surgery to repair a partially torn ACL.

=== 2026 season ===
Fearing Penix wouldn't be available at the start of the 2026 season, the Falcons signed Tua Tagovailoa. Tagovailoa was injured in practice with an oblique injury days before the season opener against the Pittsburgh Steelers. Penix was medically cleared to play the first game of the season against Pittsburgh and the second game against Carolina, but third-string quarterback Cooper Rush started both games and played poorly, resulting in losses.

Penix made his return against the Green Bay Packers in Week 3. Despite throwing an interception on the first drive, he completed 18 of 25 passes for 256 yards and a touchdown as the Falcons won 35–14.

Penix helped lead the Falcons to a big win over their rivals, the New Orleans Saints. He completed 15 of 20 passes for 223 yards and a touchdown, without throwing an interception. Penix finished the game with a 127.7 passer rating and completed 75% of his passes.

In Week 7 against the undefeated San Francisco 49ers, Penix went 25 for 34 on passes for 213 yards, three touchdowns and posted a 118.9 rating, leading the Falcons to a 29-20 upset victory and earned NFC Offensive Player of the Week.

== NFL career statistics ==
Legend
	Led the league
**Bold**	Career best

Year	Team	Games			Passing												Rushing					Sacks		Fumbles	
Year	Team	GP	GS	Record	Cmp	Att	Pct	Yds	Y/A	Y/G	Lng	TD	Int	TD%	Int%	Rtg	Att	Yds	Avg	Lng	TD	Sck	SckY	Fum	Lost
2024	ATL	5	3	1–2	61	105	58.1	775	**7.4**	155.0	42	3	**3**	2.9	2.9	78.9	7	11	1.6	5	**1**	**4**	**14**	**2**	**0**
2025	ATL	9	9	3–6	**166**	**276**	60.1	**1,982**	7.2	**220.2**	**69**	**9**	**3**	3.3	**1.1**	88.5	**21**	**70**	**3.3**	**15**	**1**	13	101	4	2
2026	ATL	8	8	**3–5**	147	242	**60.7**	1,730	**7.1**	216.3	68	**10**	7	**4.1**	2.9	**84.2**	24	94	3.9	23	0	12	72	5	**0**
Career		22	20	7–13	374	623	60.0	4,487	7.2	204.0	69	22	13	3.5	2.1	85.2	52	175	3.4	23	2	29	187	11	2

== Personal life ==
On December 29, 2024, Penix announced his engagement to his girlfriend Olivia Carter. The couple married on May 2, 2026.

Penix is a Christian.

Penix's father was a running back for the Tennessee Tech Golden Eagles in the 1990s and holds several school rushing records; his mother ran track at Tennessee Tech.
