= Julius Buelow =

American football player

No. 52
- Position: Offensive guard

Personal information
- Born: December 25, 2000 (age 25)
- Listed height: 6 ft 8 in (2.03 m)
- Listed weight: 315 lb (143 kg)

Career information
- High school: Kapolei (Kapolei, Hawaii)
- College: Washington (2019–2023); Ole Miss (2024)
- NFL draft: 2025: undrafted

Career history
- Saskatchewan Roughriders (2025)*
- * Offseason or practice squad member only

Julius Hi’ialo Fekitamoeofa Buelow (born December 25, 2000) is an American football offensive tackle. He previously played for the Washington Huskies and the Ole Miss Rebels.

== Early life ==
Buelow attended Kapolei High School in Kapolei, Hawaii. He was rated as a four-star recruit and committed to play college football for the Washington Huskies offers from schools such as Arizona, Arizona State, BYU, Florida, Florida Atlantic, Fresno State, Hawaii, Kansas State, New Mexico, Notre Dame, Oregon, Oregon State, TCU, UCLA, Utah, Utah State, Virginia, and Washington State.

== College career ==
=== Washington ===
Buelow was redshirted in 2019 and played just one game in 2020. In 2021, he started the first five games before being benched for the remainder of the year. In 2022, Buelow played at left tackle in ten games with no starts, mostly playing on special teams. He returned as a starter in week 2 of the 2023 season versus Michigan State, but suffered an injury that caused him to miss the next four games. Buelow started in both of the Huskies playoff games, including in the National Championship. In 2023, he played 12 games making nine starts for the Huskies. After season, Buelow entered the NCAA transfer portal.

In Buelow's career with the Huskies, he played in 31 games with 14 starts.

=== Ole Miss ===
Buelow transferred to play for the Ole Miss Rebels.

== Professional career ==
Buelow signed with the Saskatchewan Roughriders on April 30, 2025. He was placed on the team's reserve/suspended list on May 14, 2025.
