= Jalen McMillan =

American football player (born 2001)

No. 11 – Tampa Bay Buccaneers
- Position: Wide receiver
- Roster status: Injured reserve

Personal information
- Born: December 7, 2001 (age 24); Fresno, California, U.S.
- Listed height: 6 ft 1 in (1.85 m)
- Listed weight: 192 lb (87 kg)

Career information
- High school: San Joaquin Memorial (Fresno)
- College: Washington (2020–2023)
- NFL draft: 2024: 3rd round, 92nd overall pick

Career history
- Tampa Bay Buccaneers (2024–present)

Career NFL statistics as of 2025
- Receptions: 49
- Receiving yards: 639
- Receiving average: 13
- Receiving touchdowns: 8
- Stats at Pro Football Reference

Jalen McMillan (born December 7, 2001) is an American professional football wide receiver for the Tampa Bay Buccaneers of the National Football League (NFL). He played college football for the Washington Huskies and was selected by the Buccaneers in the third round of the 2024 NFL draft.

== Early life ==
McMillan attended San Joaquin Memorial High School in Fresno, California. As a junior and senior, McMillan combined for 3,045 yards, 31 touchdowns, and 162 receptions. He played baseball, receiving offers from Oklahoma and USC to be a dual-sport athlete. McMillan was rated as a 4-star recruit and he committed to play college football at the University of Washington, over offers from schools such as Notre Dame and Alabama.

== College career ==
As a freshman in 2020, McMillan played sparingly, recording one catch for 16 yards. In his sophomore season, McMillan's production would increase, as he led the team in receiving yards with 470 while hauling in three touchdowns and 39 catches. Entering the 2022 season, McMillan was named a preseason All-Pac-12 honorable mention In the first game of the season, McMillan caught two touchdown passes in a 45–20 victory over Kent State.

Year	Team	Games	Receiving				Rushing			
Year	Team	GP	Rec	Yards	Avg	TD	Att	Yards	Avg	TD
2020	Washington	3	1	16	16.0	0	2	14	7.0	0
2021	Washington	11	39	470	12.1	3	0	0	0.0	0
2022	Washington	13	79	1,098	13.9	9	1	2	2.0	0
2023	Washington	11	45	559	12.4	5	3	30	10.0	1
Career		38	164	2,143	13.1	17	6	46	7.7	1

== Professional career ==
Pre-draft measurables
Height	Weight	Arm length	Hand span	Wingspan	40-yard dash	10-yard split	20-yard split	20-yard shuttle	Three-cone drill	Vertical jump	Broad jump
6 ft 1 in (1.85 m)	197 lb (89 kg)	32 1/8 in (0.82 m)	10 in (0.25 m)	6 ft 5 3/8 in (1.97 m)	4.47 s	1.53 s	2.62 s	4.18 s	6.94 s	37.0 in (0.94 m)	10 ft 7 in (3.23 m)
All values from NFL Combine

McMillan was selected by the Tampa Bay Buccaneers in the third round (92nd overall) of the 2024 NFL draft. The Buccaneers selected McMillan with the pick that was traded from the Detroit Lions in exchange for Carlton Davis. In his NFL debut, McMillan scored a 32-yard receiving touchdown in the 37–20 win over the Washington Commanders in Week 1. In Week 14 of the 2024 season, McMillan scored 2 touchdowns en route to a Buccaneers win over the Las Vegas Raiders.

In Tampa Bay's second preseason game against the Pittsburgh Steelers, McMillan landed awkwardly after colliding with Daryl Porter Jr. while attempting to make a catch. He was placed on injured reserve prior to the start of the regular season on August 26, 2025. On October 31, head coach Todd Bowles announced that McMillan had suffered a broken bone in his neck as a result of the fall. He was activated on December 10, ahead of the team's Week 15 matchup against the Atlanta Falcons.

On September 30, 2026, McMillan was placed on injured reserve.

== NFL career statistics ==
Legend
**Bold**	Career high

=== Regular season ===
Year	Team	Games		Receiving					Rushing					Fumbles	
Year	Team	GP	GS	Rec	Yds	Avg	Lng	TD	Att	Yds	Avg	Lng	TD	Fum	Lost
2024	TB	13	12	**37**	**461**	12.5	**33**	**8**	**4**	**43**	**10.8**	**17**	0	0	0
2025	TB	4	2	12	178	**14.8**	**33**	0	1	1	1.0	1	0	0	0
Career		17	14	49	639	13.0	33	8	5	44	8.8	17	0	0	0
