= 2024 College Football Playoff National Championship =

Postseason college football bowl game

2024 College Football Playoff National Championship presented by AT&T
- 10th College Football Playoff National Championship
Washington Huskies	Michigan Wolverines
(14–0)	(14–0)
Pac-12	Big Ten
13	34
Head coach: Kalen DeBoer	Head coach: Jim Harbaugh
AP / Coaches / CFP; 2 / 2 / 2	AP / Coaches / CFP; 1 / 1 / 1
	1	2	3	4	Total
Washington	3	7	3	0	13
Michigan	14	3	3	14	34
- Date: January 8, 2024
- Season: 2023
- Stadium: NRG Stadium
- Location: Houston, Texas
- MVP: Blake Corum (Michigan, RB); Will Johnson (Michigan, CB)
- Favorite: Michigan by 4.5
- National anthem: Fantasia
- Referee: Marcus Woods (ACC)
- Attendance: 72,808

United States TV coverage
- Network: ESPN
- Announcers: Chris Fowler (play-by-play), Kirk Herbstreit (analyst), Holly Rowe and Molly McGrath (sidelines)
- Nielsen ratings: 12.3 (25.1 million viewers)

International TV coverage
- Network: ESPN Deportes; Brazil: ESPN Brazil/Star+ Canada: TSN1/3/4/5; Latin America: ESPN/Star+ Oceania: ESPN
- Announcers: ESPN Deportes: Eduardo Varela (play-by-play), Pablo Viruega (analyst), Katia Castorena (sidelines) and Sebastian M. Christensen (analyst); ESPN Brazil: Matheus Pinheiro, Weinny Eirado, Deivis Chiodini and Giane Pessoa

The 2024 College Football Playoff National Championship (officially known as the 2024 College Football Playoff National Championship presented by AT&T for sponsorship reasons) was a college football bowl game that was played on January 8, 2024, at NRG Stadium in Houston, Texas, United States. The tenth College Football Playoff National Championship, the game determined the national champion of the NCAA Division I Football Bowl Subdivision (FBS) for the 2023 season. It was the final game of the 2023–24 College Football Playoff (CFP) and, aside from any all-star games afterward, the culminating game of the 2023–24 bowl season. The game began at approximately 6:45 p.m. CST and was televised nationally by ESPN.

The game featured the No. 1 Michigan Wolverines of the Big Ten Conference (winners of the Rose Bowl) and the No. 2 Washington Huskies of the Pac-12 Conference (winners of the Sugar Bowl). Michigan and Washington had met in four previous Rose Bowls (1978, 1981, 1992, 1993) in the traditional matchup between Big Ten and Pac-8/10 champions. The game was the first CFP National Championship Game without a participant from the Southeastern Conference (SEC) since 2015. Due to the expansion of the College Football Playoff to twelve teams beginning in 2024–25, it was the final CFP National Championship Game under the four-team format; it was also Washington's last game as a member of the Pac-12 before their move to the Big Ten in time for the 2024 season.

Michigan led at the conclusion of the first quarter after two touchdown rushes, each of more than 40 yards, by Donovan Edwards; a 25-yard field goal was Washington's only score until a touchdown pass from Michael Penix Jr. to Jalen McMillan late in the first half. This narrowed the Huskies' halftime deficit to seven points. Penix was intercepted on the first play of the second half, giving Michigan possession near the red zone and ultimately leading to a 38-yard field goal. Washington scored another field goal but a second Penix interception and a turnover on downs by the Huskies in the fourth quarter led to two more Michigan touchdowns, both rushes by Blake Corum, the eventual offensive most valuable player (MVP). Michigan won the game 34–13, securing their first national championship since 1997 and first outright national championship since 1948. The victory made them the fourth NCAA FBS national champion to finish 15–0.

== Background ==
=== Host selection ===
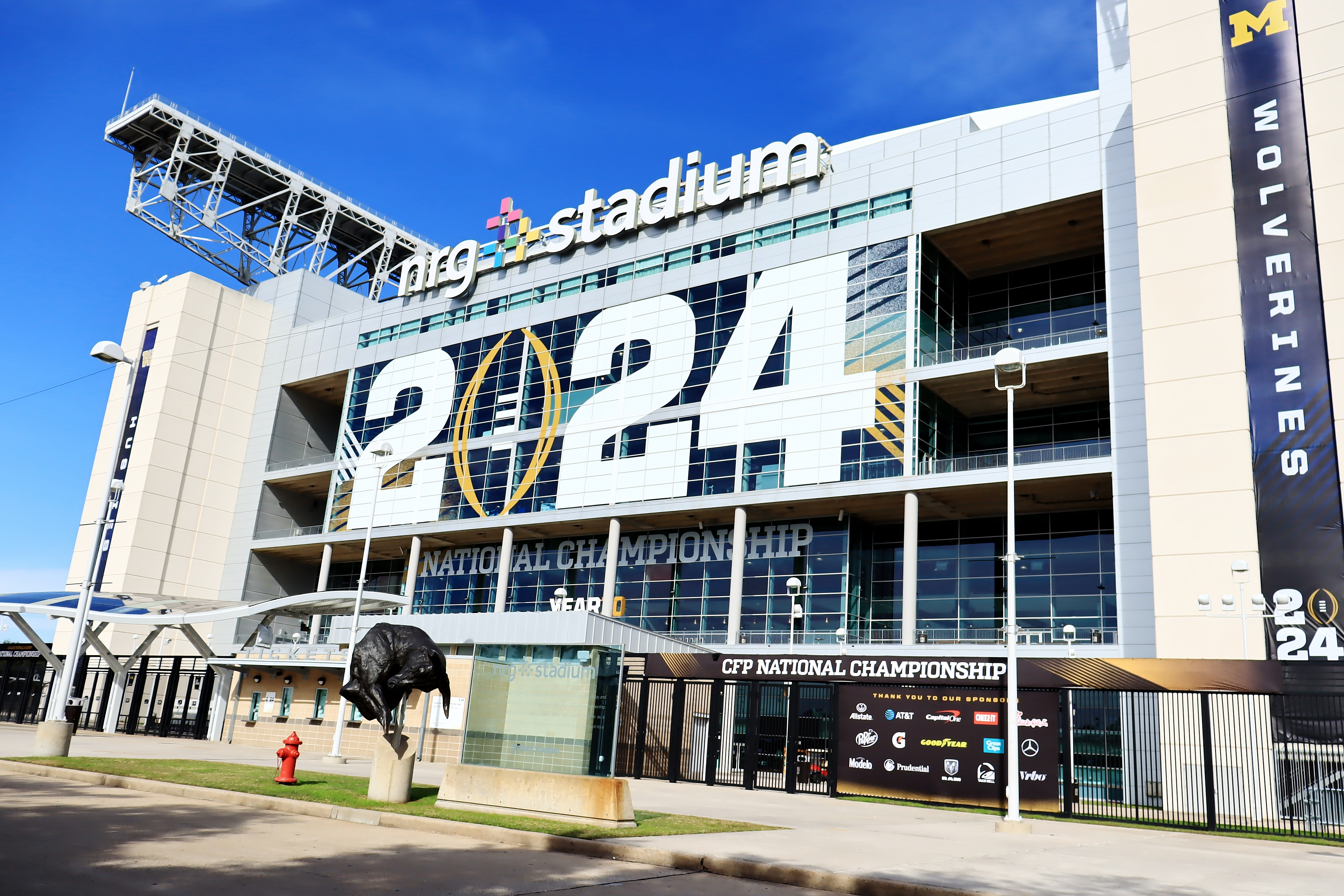
The exterior of NRG Stadium on January 6, 2024

NRG Stadium in Houston was the site chosen for the game on November 1, 2017. Houston was the tenth city to host the College Football Playoff National Championship (after Arlington, Glendale, Tampa, Atlanta, Santa Clara, New Orleans, Miami Gardens, Indianapolis, and Inglewood). While it had not before hosted the CFP National Championship, the stadium had previously hosted major events from multiple sports, including the 2016 Copa América, numerous CONCACAF Gold Cups, three Final Fours (2011, 2016, 2023), and two Super Bowls (2004, 2017). It is the regular host of the National Football League's Houston Texans and the NCAA's postseason Texas Bowl. In addition, it is scheduled to host matches as part of the 2026 FIFA World Cup.

NRG Stadium arranged for the game
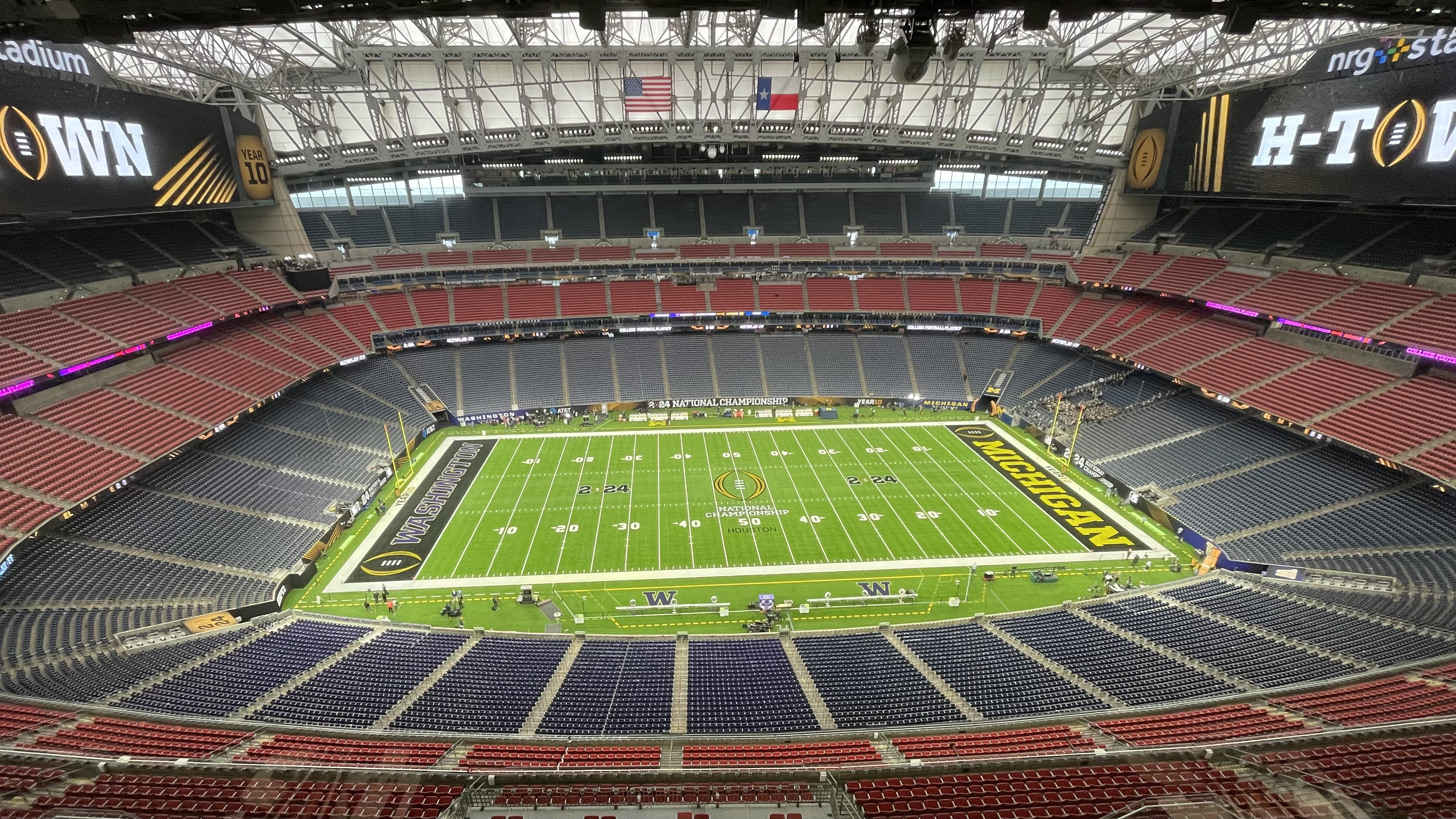
Press box view

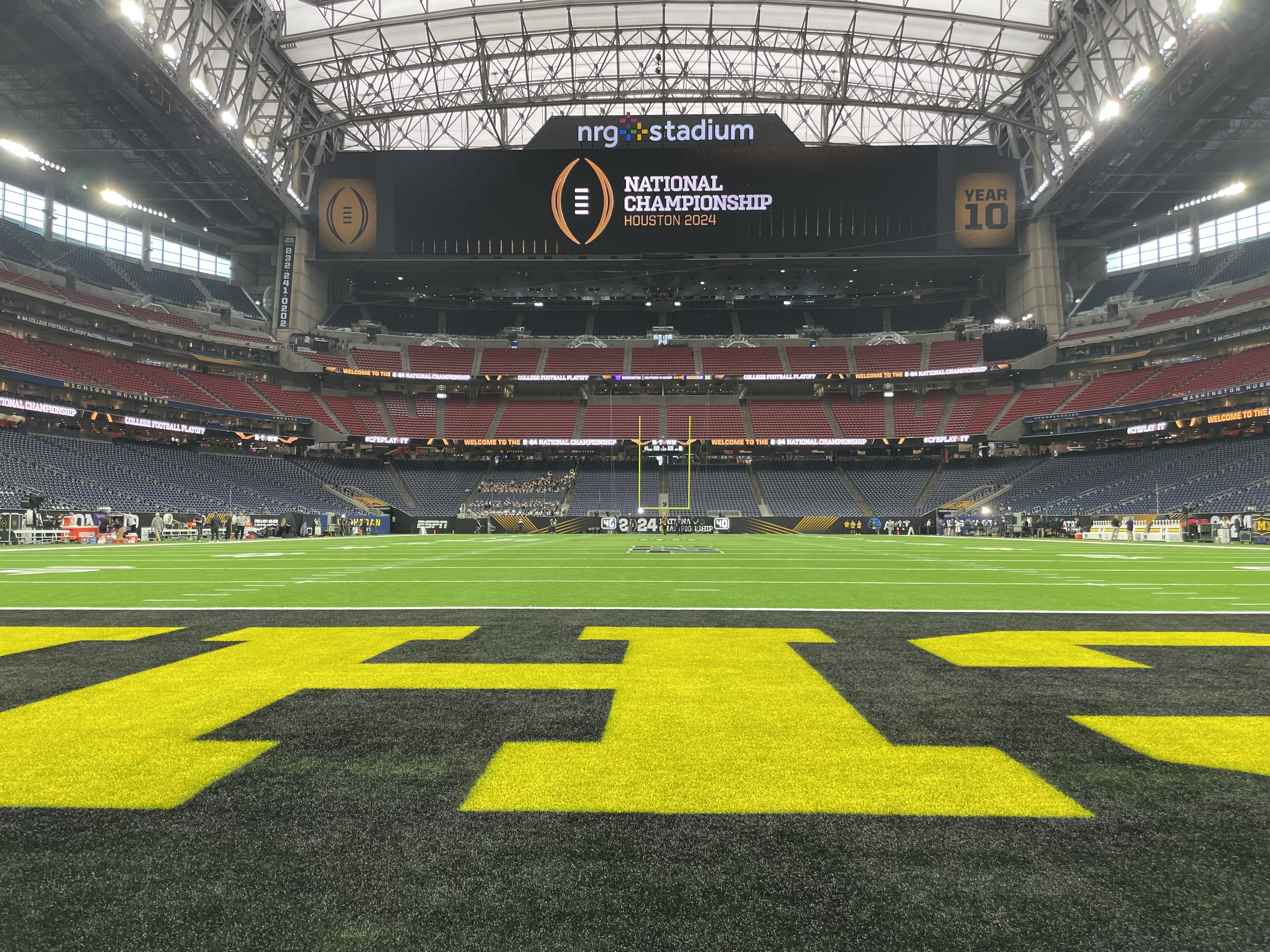
South end zone view

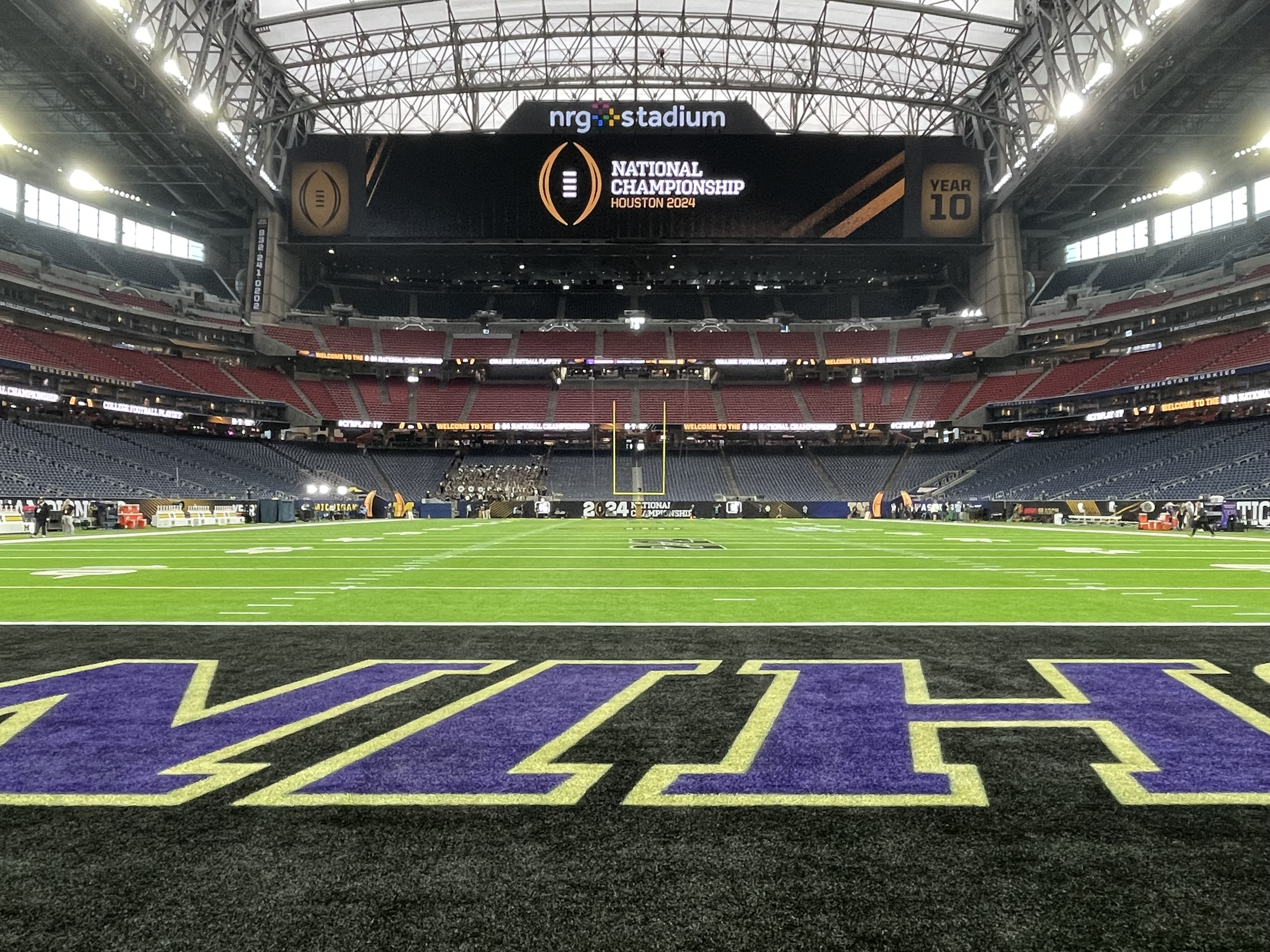
North end zone view

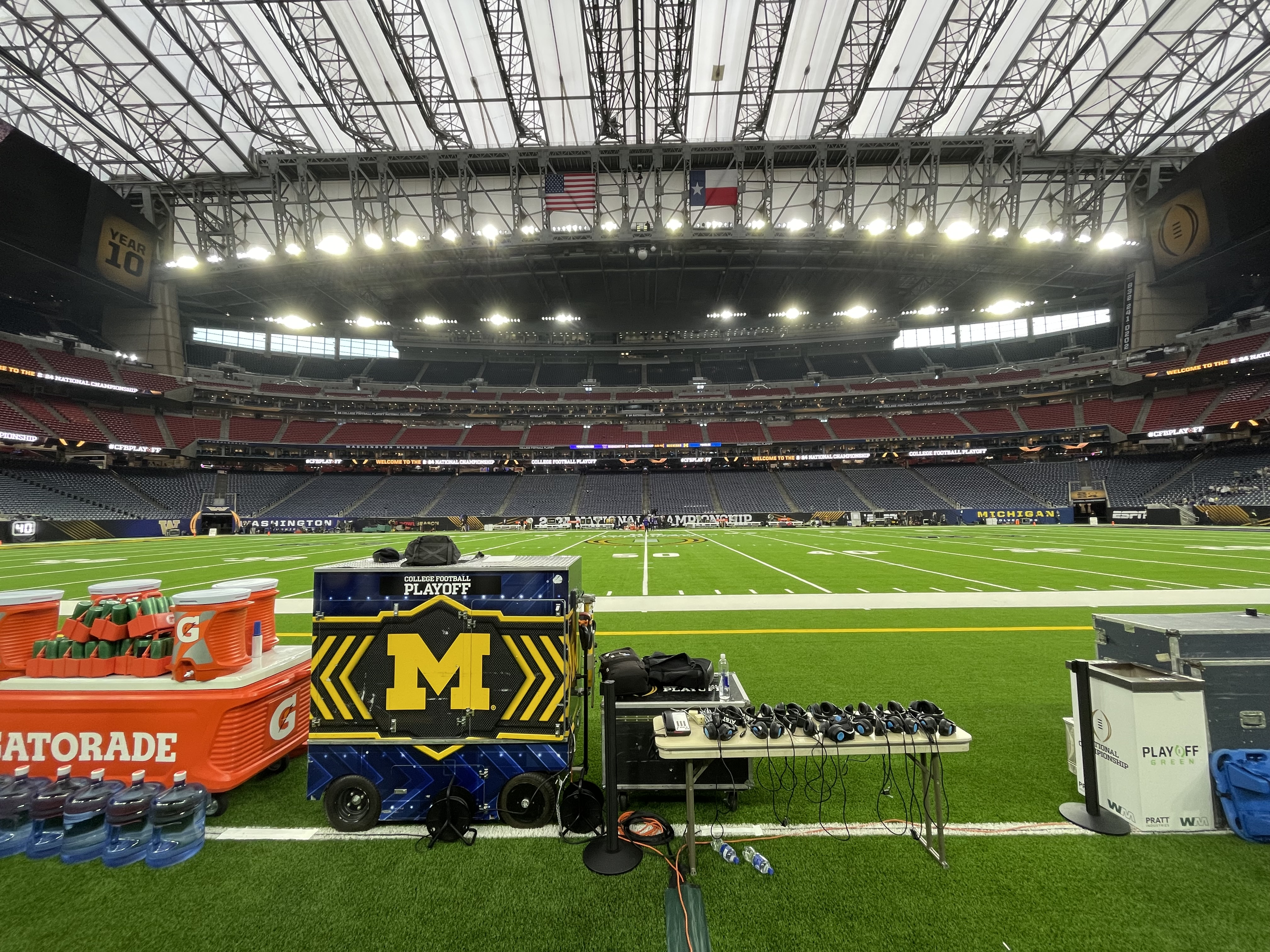
Michigan sideline view

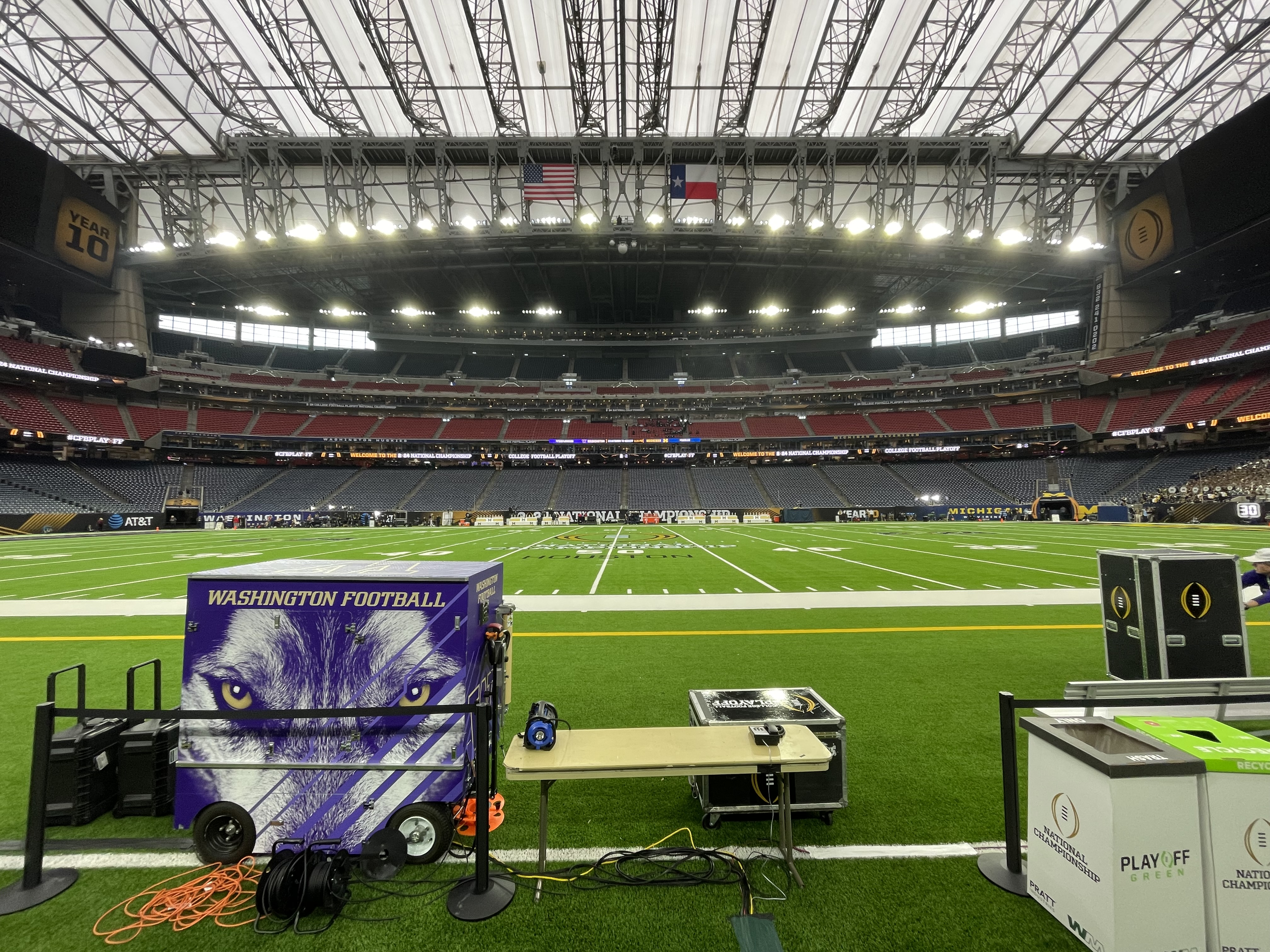
Washington sideline view
Photos taken pre-game

== Teams ==
The game marked the fourteenth meeting between Michigan and Washington; the Wolverines led the all-time series entering the game with eight wins to Washington's five. The most recent meeting between the two was on September 11, 2021, when Michigan defeated Washington, 31–10, at Michigan Stadium in Ann Arbor. Michigan and Washington had met four times at the Rose Bowl (1978, 1981, 1992, 1993) in the traditional matchup between the Big Ten and Pac–8/10 champion; this would be the fifth postseason meeting between the teams and the first outside of Pasadena. Each team had won two of the Rose Bowl matchups.

Each of Michigan and Washington's most recent national championships was a split national championship in the 1990s, with Washington topping the Coaches Poll in 1991 and Michigan the AP Poll in 1997. This was the first time that either team had played in a definitive national championship game, as neither school participated in a Bowl Coalition, Bowl Alliance, or BCS championship game. Both teams lost in the semi-finals of their previous College Football Playoff brackets, Washington in 2016 and Michigan in 2021 and 2022.

As part of the ongoing 2021–2024 NCAA conference realignment and collapse of the Pac-12, Washington joined the Big Ten Conference as a full member effective August 2, 2024, meaning that the teams are conference opponents beginning in the 2024 season. Their first inter-conference game took place at Husky Stadium in Seattle on October 5, 2024; Washington won the rematch in an upset by a score of 27–17.

=== Washington ===
Washington finished their regular season with a perfect 12–0 record, making them the first Pac-12 team to complete an undefeated regular season since Oregon in 2010, when the conference was still the Pac-10. They finished as regular season Pac-12 champions and, as a result, qualified for the 2023 Pac-12 Football Championship Game against Oregon. The Huskies and Ducks had met earlier in the season, on October 14 in Seattle when Washington won 36–33. In the conference championship rematch in Las Vegas, Washington prevailed again, this time by a score of 34–31. The playoff committee seeded them No. 2 and paired them with No. 3 Texas in the Sugar Bowl semi-final game; Washington won that game, 37–31, to advance to the national championship game.

Washington's two postseason victories gave them a 14–0 record entering the game. They were seeking their first national championship since 1991, when they were named national champions by the Coaches Poll, FWAA, and the NFF following a Rose Bowl win over Michigan; they have never won an outright national championship. This was Washington's second CFP appearance after a semi-final loss to Alabama in 2016 Peach Bowl. Washington head coach Kalen DeBoer was seeking his fourth national championship after winning three NAIA national titles as the head coach of the Sioux Falls Cougars in 2006, 2008, and 2009.

Washington quarterback Michael Penix Jr. won the Maxwell Award and was one of four finalists for the Heisman Trophy, awarded to the most outstanding player in college football in a given year. He finished runner-up to LSU quarterback Jayden Daniels and ahead of Oregon quarterback Bo Nix and Ohio State wide receiver Marvin Harrison Jr.

=== Michigan ===
Michigan finished the regular season with a perfect 12–0 record, having concluded their Big Ten schedule with a rivalry win over Ohio State, 30–24. As Ohio State also entered the game undefeated, the Big Ten Conference East Division championship was on the line and Michigan's win and subsequent division title earned them a berth to the 2023 Big Ten Football Championship Game against the West Division champion Iowa. They defeated Iowa in a 26–0 shutout to claim their third consecutive conference championship; the Associated Press said that Iowa "never had a chance" in the game and remarked that Michigan was likely to claim the No. 1 seed in the playoff, which they ultimately did. The Wolverines defeated No. 4 Alabama in their semi-final game at the Rose Bowl in overtime, giving them a national championship berth.

Michigan entered the title game with a 14–0 record. They were seeking their first national championship since 1997, when they defeated Washington State in the Rose Bowl and were named national champions by the AP Poll, FWAA, and the NFF. Their last outright national championship was in 1948, when they finished undefeated at 9–0. This was Michigan's third appearance in the College Football Playoff after semi-final losses to Georgia in 2021 and TCU in 2022; their semi-final win over Alabama was their first CFP victory.

The game was played during an ongoing investigation into allegations of sign-stealing by Michigan Wolverines staff members. The scandal was a major headline for the team throughout the season; it centered around an allegation and subsequent investigations by the NCAA and Big Ten as to whether Michigan violated an NCAA bylaw regarding the scouting of future opponents. Connor Stalions, a Michigan football staffer, was cited by allegations as having attended more than 35 games to scout future opponents. Head coach Jim Harbaugh, who denied knowledge of the scouting, was suspended by the Big Ten for the team's last three regular season games against Penn State, Maryland, and Ohio State. He had previously served a suspension for the team's first three games of the season, against East Carolina, UNLV, and Bowling Green, as the result of a self-imposed sanction regarding recruiting violations.

== Starting lineups ==
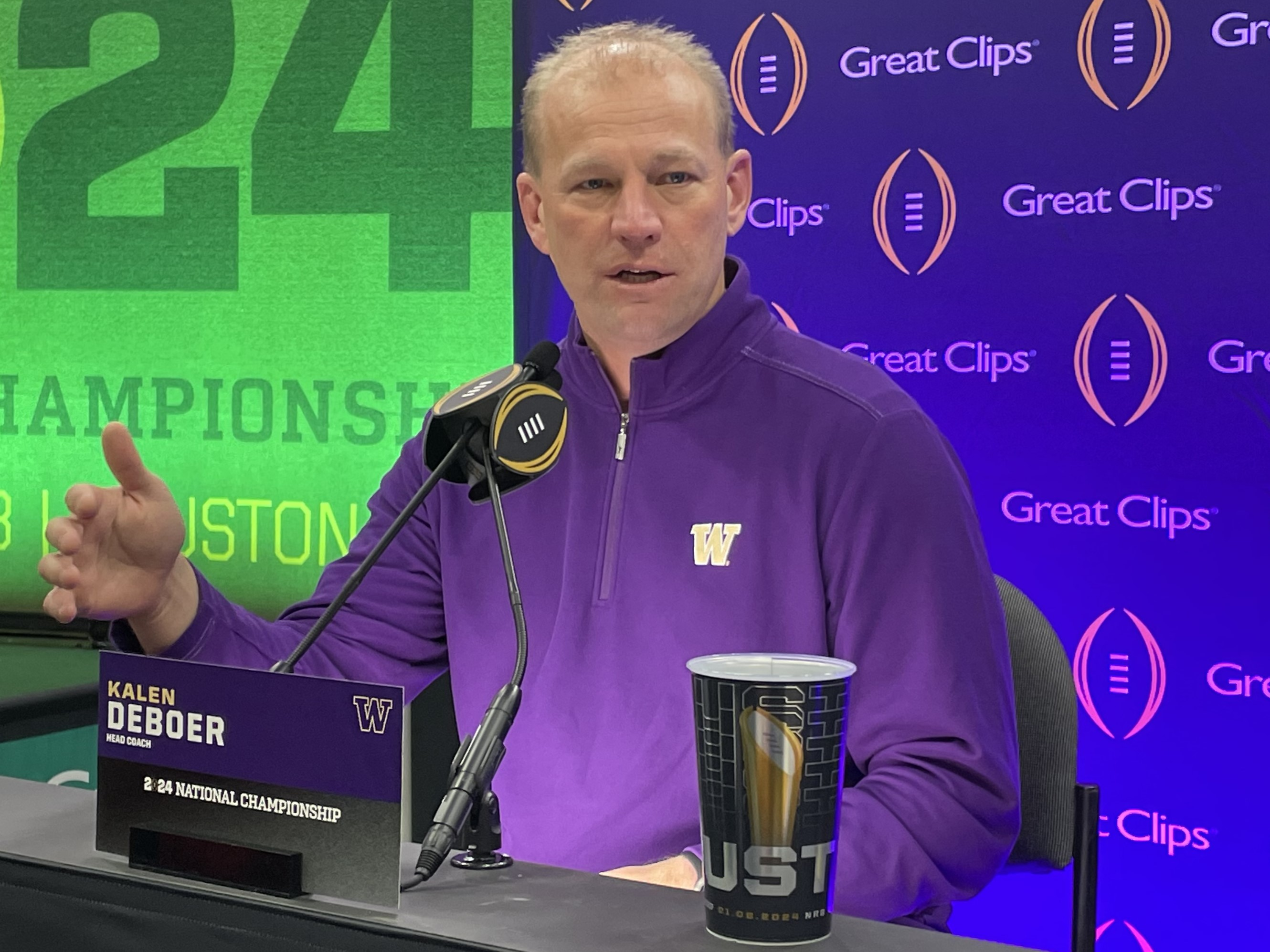
Washington head coach Kalen DeBoer

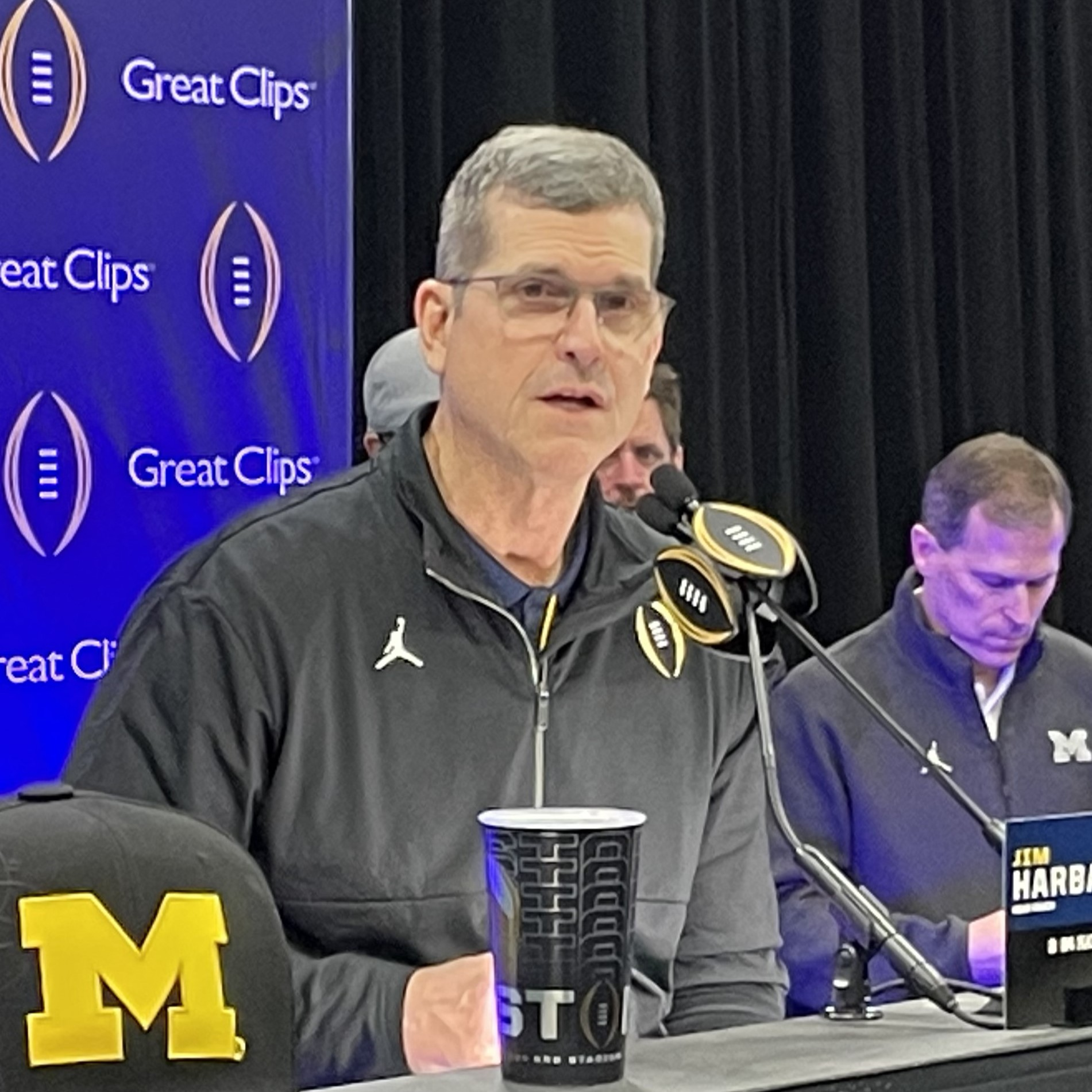
Michigan head coach Jim Harbaugh

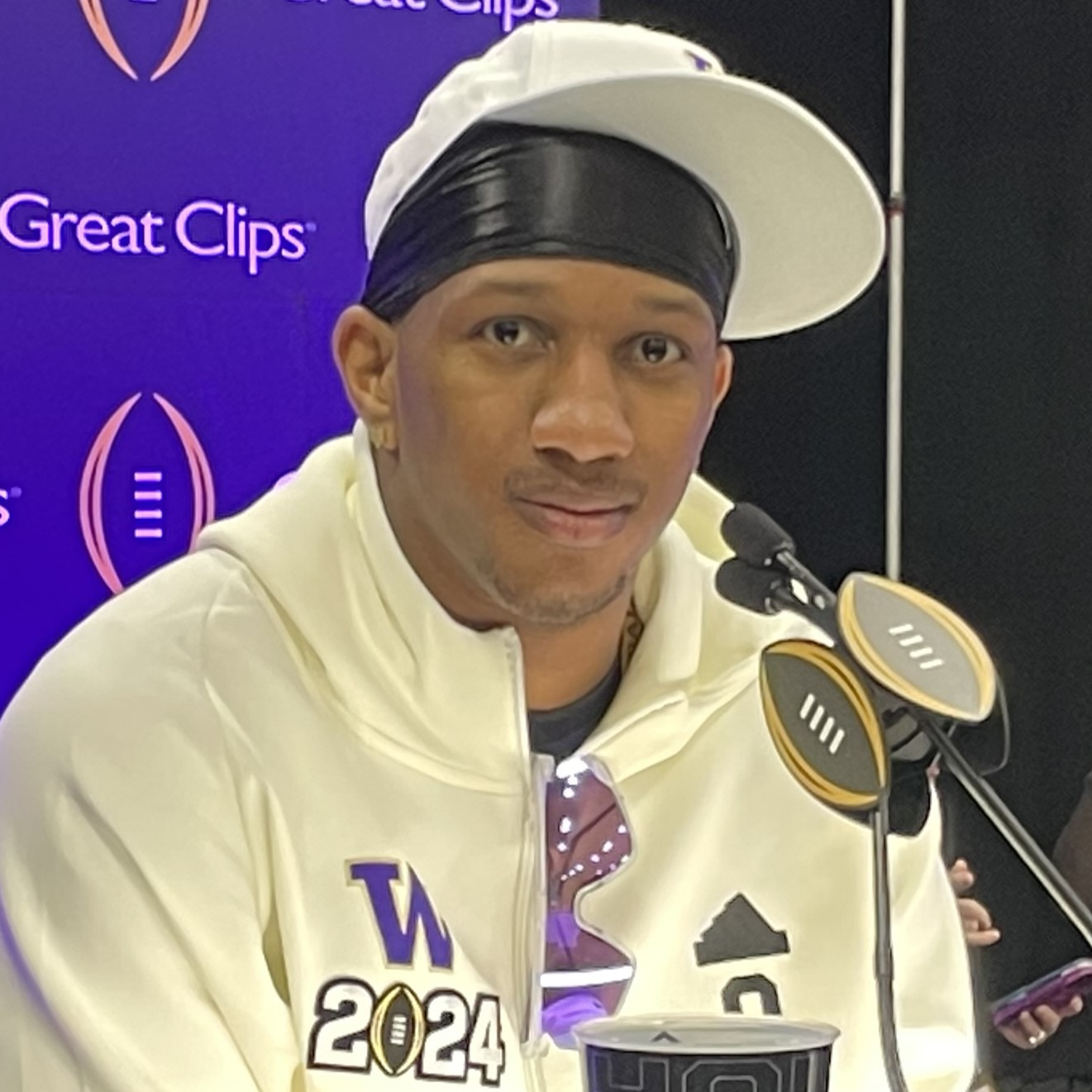
Washington quarterback Michael Penix Jr.

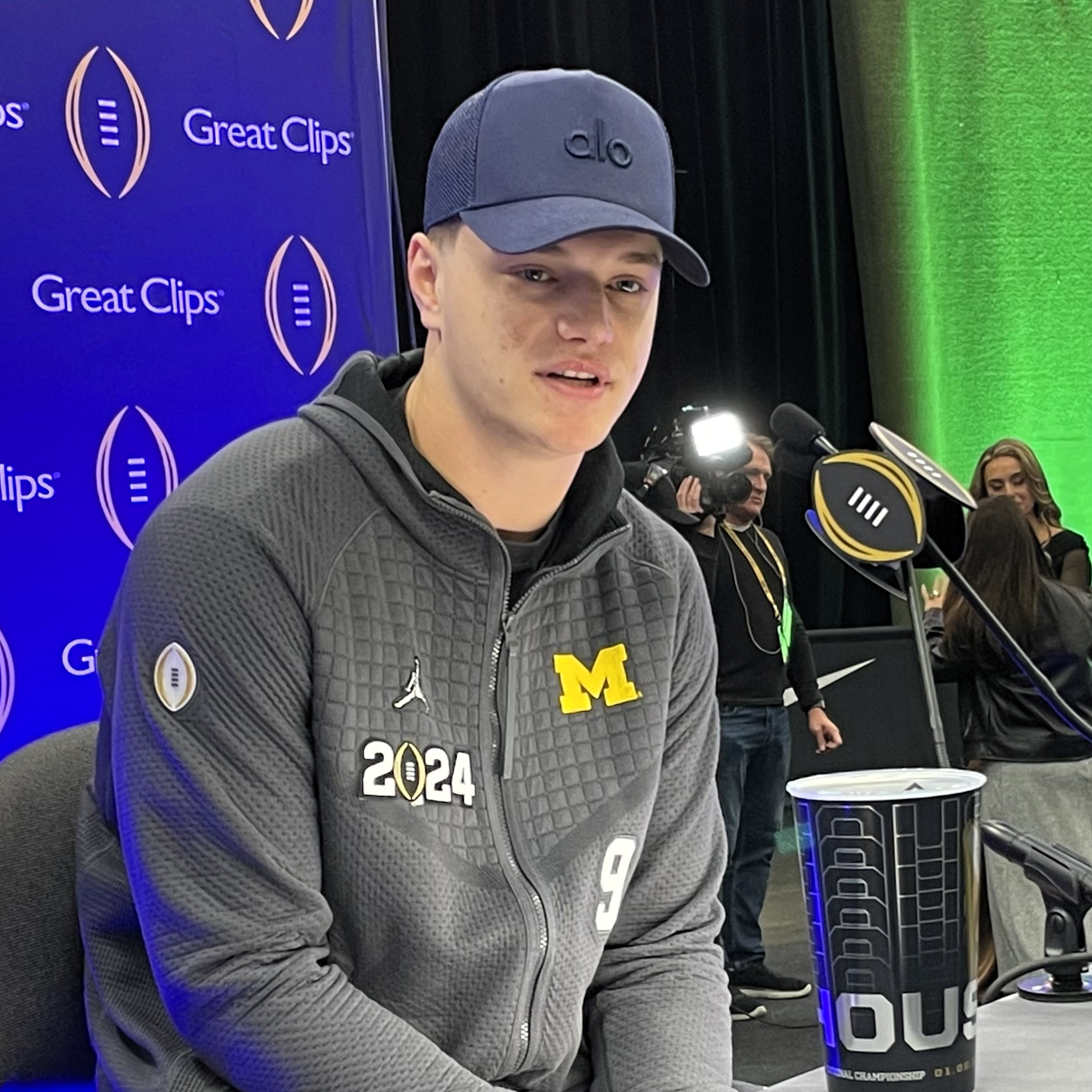
Michigan quarterback J. J. McCarthy

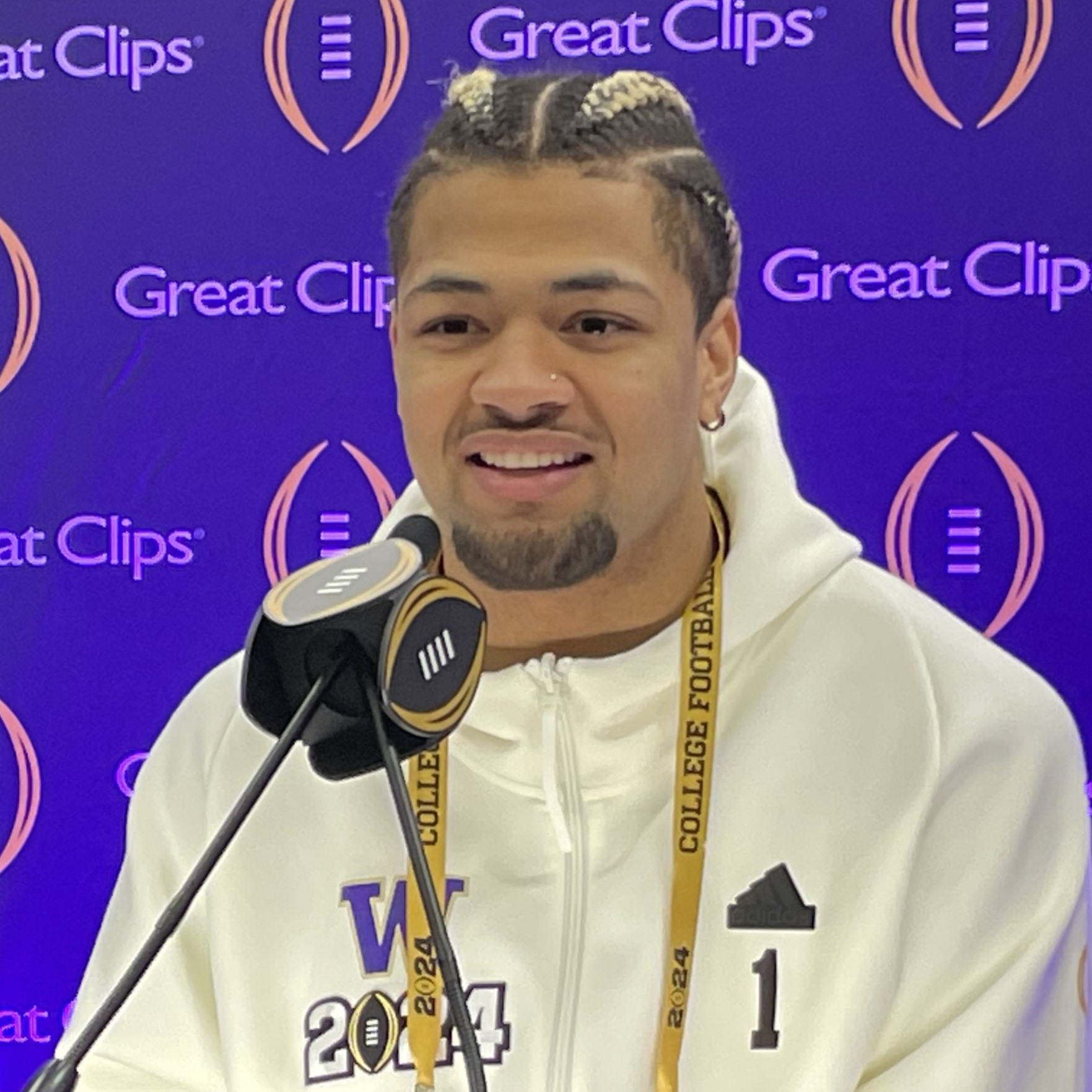
Washington wide receiver Rome Odunze

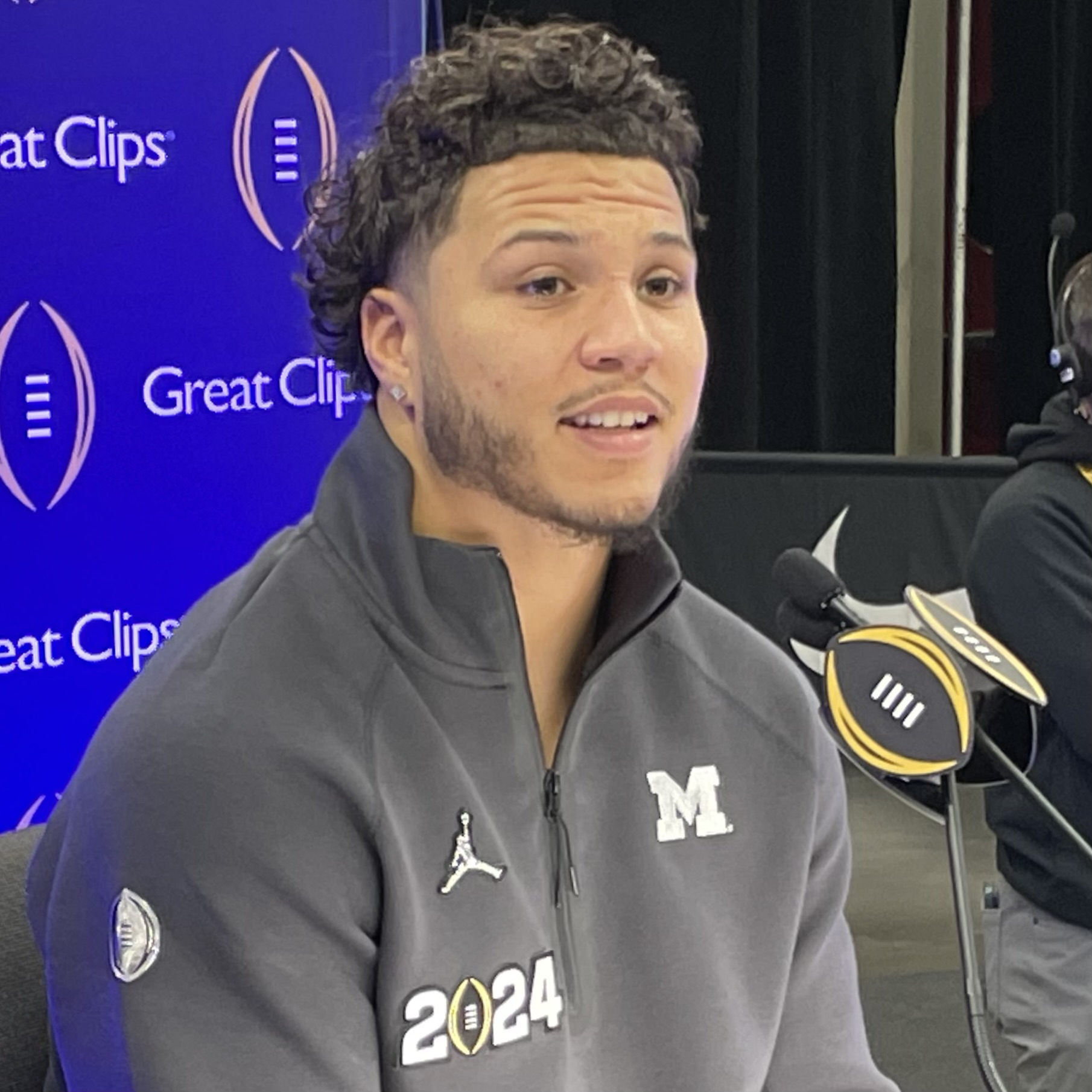
Michigan running back Blake Corum

Washington	Position		Michigan
Offense
† Rome Odunze 1	WR		Tyler Morris
Ja'Lynn Polk 2	WR		Cornelius Johnson 7
Troy Fautanu 1	LT		LaDarius Henderson 7
Nate Kalepo	LG		Trevor Keegan 5
Parker Brailsford 5	C		Drake Nugent
Julius Buelow	RG		Karsen Barnhart
Roger Rosengarten 2	RT		Trente Jones
Jack Westover	TE		Colston Loveland 1
Devin Culp 7	TE	WR	Roman Wilson 3
Michael Penix Jr. 1	QB		J. J. McCarthy 1
Dillon Johnson	RB		† Blake Corum 3
Defense
Tuli Letuligasenoa	DL		Mason Graham 1
Faatui Tuitele	DL		Kris Jenkins 2
Bralen Trice 3	DE		Jaylen Harrell 7
Alphonzo Tuputala	LB	DE	Braiden McGregor
Zion Tupuola-Fetui	LB		Michael Barrett 7
Edefuan Ulofoshio 5	LB		Junior Colson 3
Jabbar Muhammad	CB		Will Johnson 2
Elijah Jackson	CB		Mike Sainristil 2
Dominique Hampton 5	SS		Rod Moore
Asa Turner	FS		Keon Sabb
Mishael Powell	DB		Makari Paige
Source • † 2023 All-American
Selected in an NFL Draft (number corresponds to draft round)

== Game summary ==
The game's officiating crew, representing the Atlantic Coast Conference, was led by referee Marcus Woods. The game, which took place on January 8, 2024, was scheduled to begin at 6:30 p.m. local CST, though its actual start time was 6:46 pm. The pregame coin toss was won by Washington, who deferred their choice to the second half, thereby giving Michigan possession of the ball to begin the game.

=== First half ===
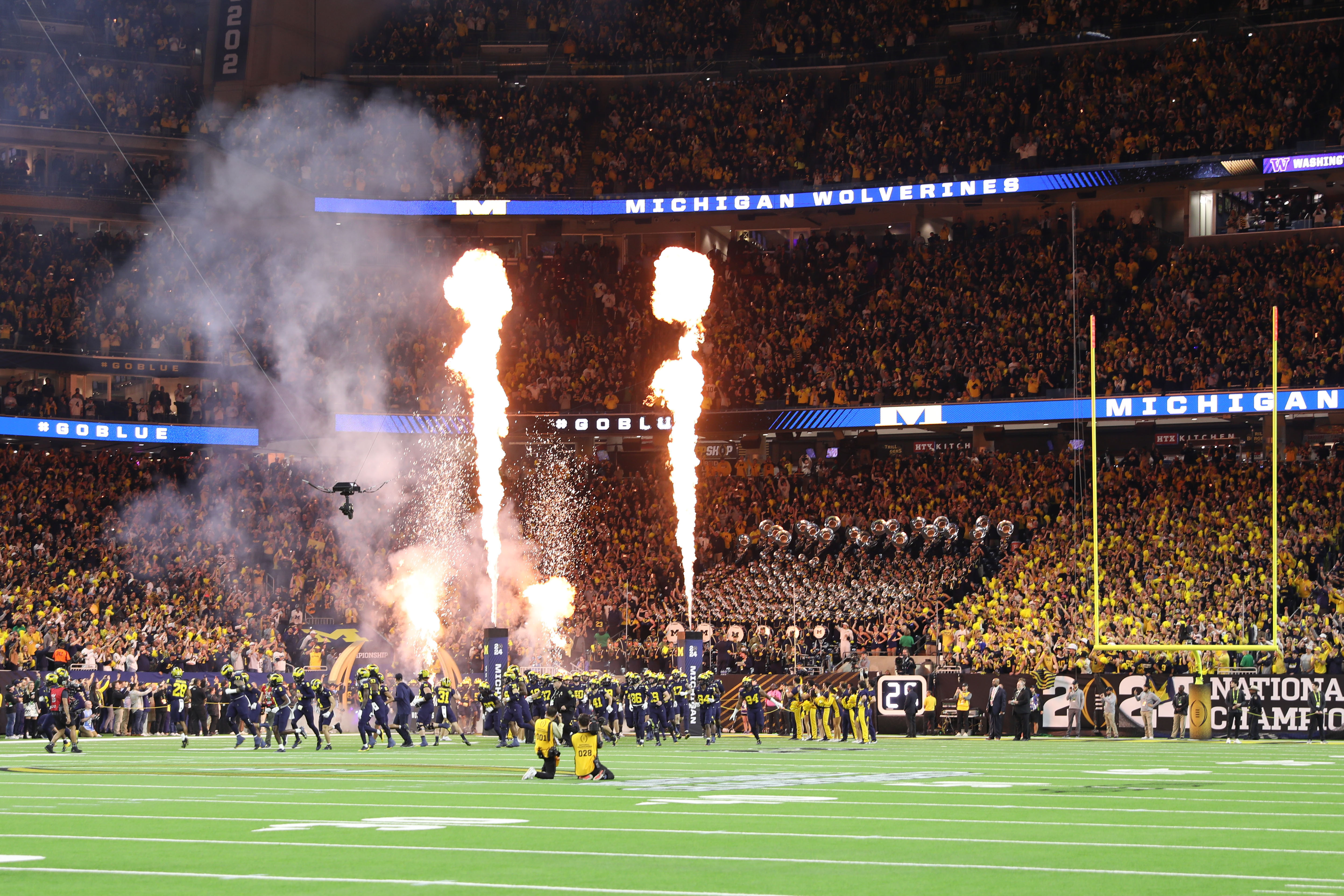
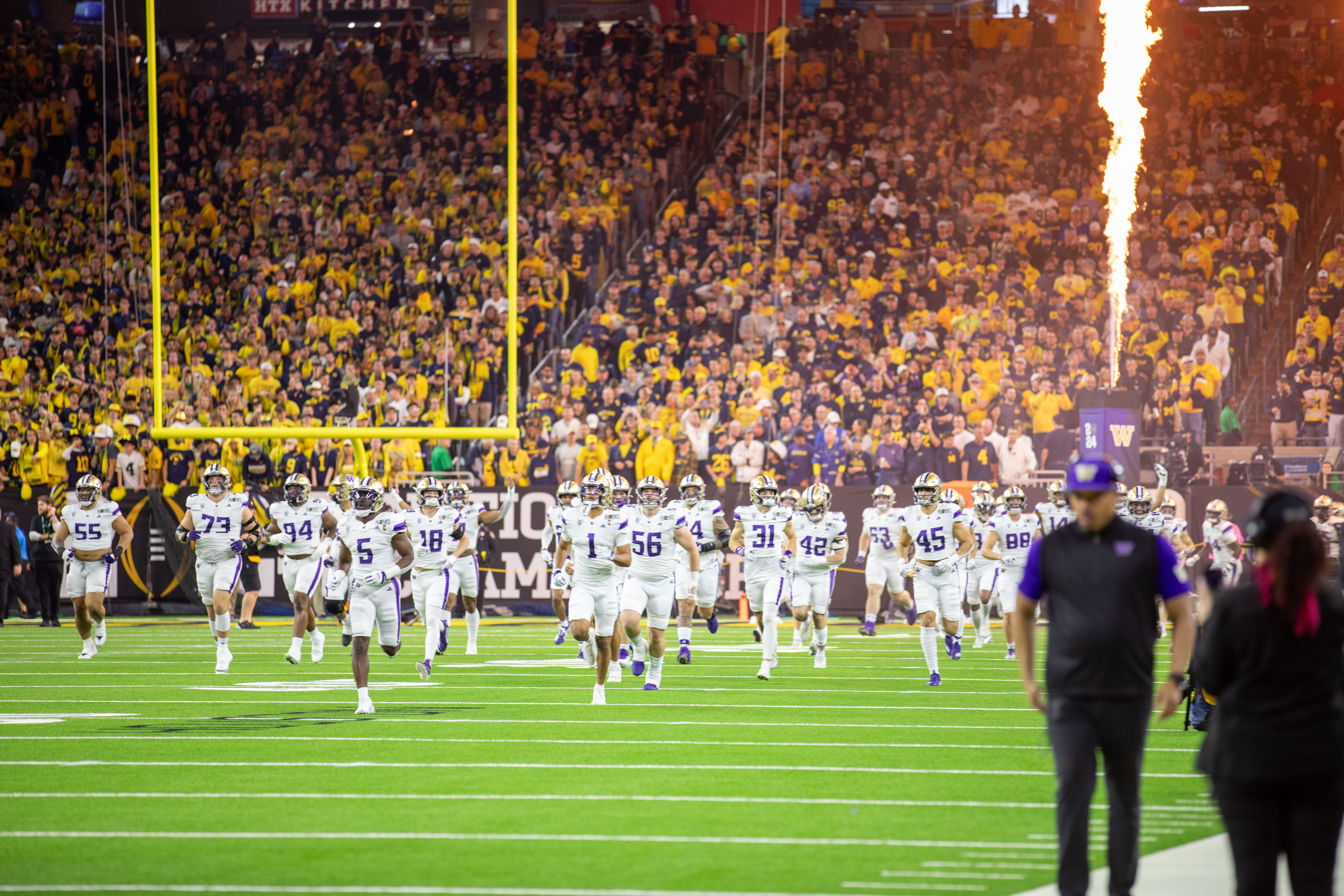
The Michigan (left) and Washington (right) teams take the field before the start of the game.

Washington kicker Grady Gross began the game as the opening kickoff was returned by Michigan's Semaj Morgan to the Wolverines' 16-yard line. The first three drives of the game all resulted in scoring plays for their respective teams. The Wolverines traveled 84 yards over the course of eight plays en route to the game's opening touchdown, scored on a 41-yard rush by running back Donovan Edwards. Washington scored a field goal on their first possession; they converted three third downs throughout the drive and finished with a 25-yard kick by Gross, which made the score 7–3 in favor of Michigan. The Wolverines' ensuing drive contrasted to Washington's first in length and result: UW took 14 plays and over six minutes of game time to score their field goal, whereas Michigan scored their second touchdown in four plays, which took less than a minute and a half off of the clock. With 3:46 remaining in the opening quarter, quarterback J. J. McCarthy completed a pass to wide receiver Roman Wilson for a 37-yard gain, and Edwards scored on a 46-yard touchdown rush just over a minute later. Placekicker James Turner made the extra point, giving Michigan an eleven-point lead. Washington was unable to respond as a rush for no gain by Dillon Johnson and an incomplete pass forced the contest's first three-and-out. Jack McCallister punted and the kick was downed by Jaden Green at the Michigan 21-yard line. With 21 seconds remaining in the first quarter, running back Blake Corum rushed for a gain of 59 yards before he was tackled at the Washington 20-yard line; this was the last play of the first quarter.

Following the long rush, Michigan was unable to gain a first down; Turner kicked a 31-yard field goal on 4th & 4 to extend his team's lead to fourteen points 1:29 into the second quarter. After the field goal, neither team scored for nearly thirteen minutes. Washington's ensuing drive ended with a turnover on downs at the Michigan 47-yard line following an incomplete pass thrown by quarterback Michael Penix Jr. that was intended for wide receiver Rome Odunze. Both teams then recorded three-and-outs, with Michigan failing to gain any yards before punting for a touchback and Washington gaining a net total of three yards (despite suffering a quarterback sack on first down) before punting the ball back to the Wolverines. Michigan faced 4th & 2 from the Washington 38-yard line on their next offensive series and elected to go for it, but failed in doing so and turned the ball over on downs. The Huskies scored their first touchdown exactly four minutes later, with Penix passing to Jalen McMillan for a 3-yard touchdown with 42 seconds remaining in the half; this play was also a fourth down conversion attempt. The successful extra point made the score 17–10 in favor of the Wolverines, who went three-and-out on their last drive of the half and punted; Washington took a knee to end the half.

=== Second half ===
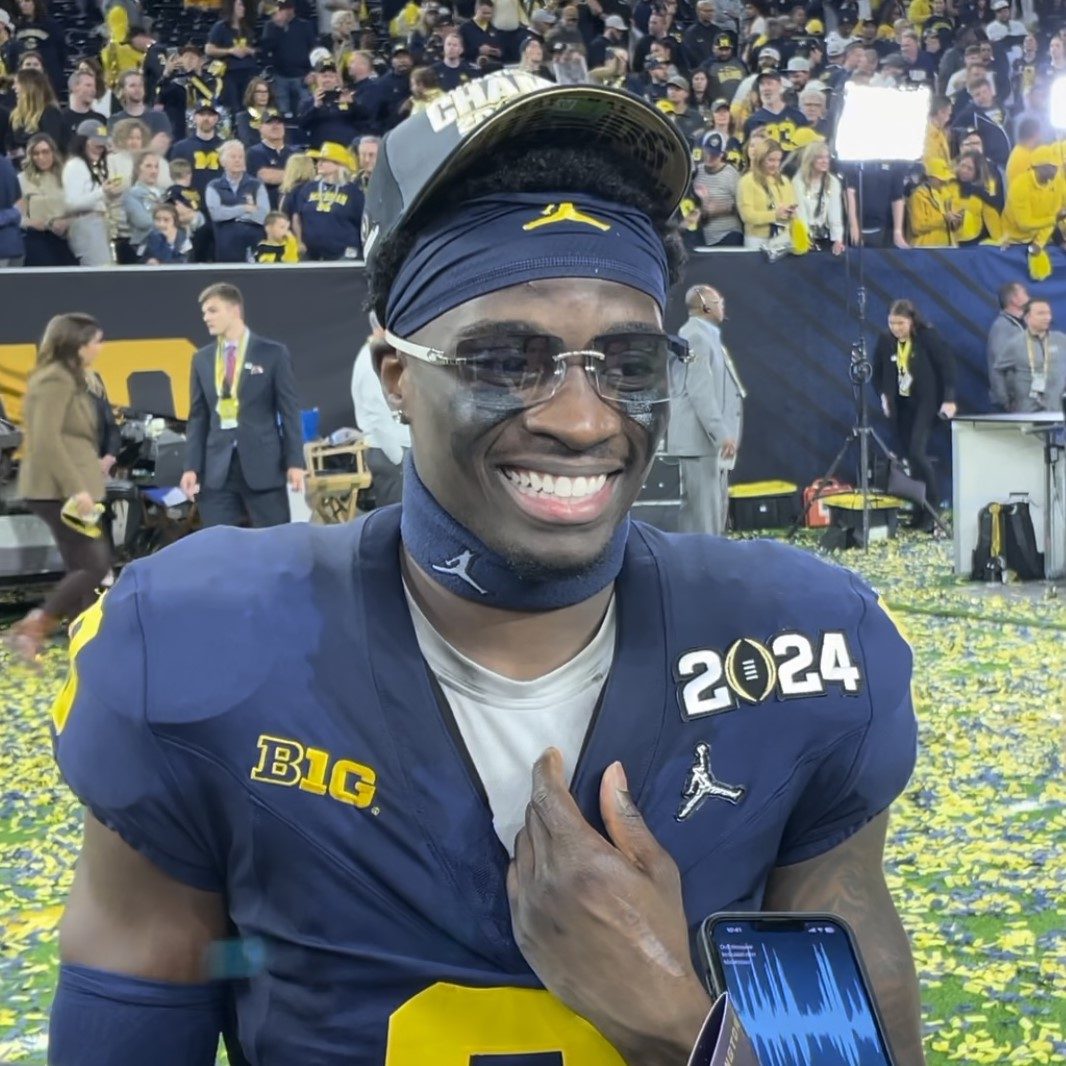
Mike Sainristil caught a critical interception and returned it 81 yards to help seal Michigan's victory.

The first turnover of the championship game came on the first play from scrimmage of the third quarter. After UW received the ball to begin the half, Penix threw a pass which was intended for Tybo Rogers but was intercepted by cornerback Will Johnson at the Washington 32-yard line. Michigan extended their lead to ten points after a three-minute drive that resulted in a 38-yard Turner field goal. Washington scored a field goal on their following drive, which was advanced down the field in part because of an unnecessary roughness penalty called on defensive back Makari Paige. The kick was from a distance of 45 yards and made by Gross, narrowing the Michigan advantage back down to seven points. The remainder of the third quarter consisted of the teams trading punts; only four first downs were recorded by both teams combined in the remaining 8:58 of the quarter and neither team crossed midfield. The quarter ended after a completed 12-yard pass from Penix to tight end Jack Westover which moved the ball to the Washington 23-yard line, with Michigan leading 20–13.

The teams continued to trade punts in the early stages of the fourth quarter; Washington failed to gain a first down following the completed pass which ended the third quarter and the next series for both teams resulted in a three-and-out. Michigan broke the streak with a five-play drive that began with a 41-yard pass by McCarthy to tight end Colston Loveland and resulted in a 12-yard touchdown rush by Corum with 7:09 remaining in the contest. Soon after, Washington found themselves facing 4th & 13 on the Michigan 30-yard line; on the play, a defensive pass interference penalty was called that would have given UW an automatic first down but the down was replayed because of an offensive holding call. The next fourth down conversion attempt resulted in an interception by defensive back Mike Sainristil, who returned the pass 81 yards to the Washington 8-yard line. Corum scored his second touchdown with a 1-yard rush two plays later, and Turner added the extra point to give Michigan a 34–13 lead. Those were the game's final points; Washington's last drive ended on an incomplete pass intended for Devin Culp on 4th & 10 from the UW 31-yard line that resulted in a turnover on downs. Corum rushed for 1-yard before the Wolverines kneeled twice to run out the clock and secure a 21-point national championship victory.

=== Scoring summary ===
2024 College Football Playoff National Championship presented by AT&T

Quarter	1	2	3	4	Total
No. 2 Washington	3	7	3	0	13
No. 1 Michigan	14	3	3	14	34

at NRG Stadium • Houston, Texas

- Date: January 8, 2024
- Game time: 6:46 p.m. CST
- Game weather: n/a (game played indoors)
- Game attendance: 72,808
- Referee: Marcus Woods (ACC)
- TV announcers (ESPN): Chris Fowler (play-by-play), Kirk Herbstreit (analyst), Holly Rowe and Molly McGrath (sideline reporters)
- Box score

Scoring summary

Quarter	Time	Drive			Team	Scoring information	Score	
Quarter	Time	Plays	Yards	TOP	Team	Scoring information	Washington	Michigan
1	10:14	8	84	4:46	Michigan	Donovan Edwards 41-yard touchdown run, James Turner kick good	0	7
1	3:56	14	67	6:18	Washington	25-yard field goal by Grady Gross	3	7
1	2:23	4	86	1:33	Michigan	Donovan Edwards 46-yard touchdown run, James Turner kick good	3	14
2	13:28	5	65	1:53	Michigan	31-yard field goal by James Turner	3	17
2	0:42	11	61	4:01	Washington	Jalen McMillan 3-yard touchdown reception from Michael Penix Jr., Grady Gross kick good	10	17
3	11:55	6	12	3:00	Michigan	38-yard field goal by James Turner	10	20
3	8:58	7	47	2:57	Washington	45-yard field goal by Grady Gross	13	20
4	7:09	5	71	2:35	Michigan	Blake Corum 12-yard touchdown run, James Turner kick good	13	27
4	3:37	2	8	0:52	Michigan	Blake Corum 1-yard touchdown run, James Turner kick good	13	34
"TOP" = time of possession. For other American football terms, see Glossary of American football.							13	34

== Statistics ==
Team statistical comparison
Statistic	Washington	Michigan
First downs	17	16
First downs rushing	2	10
First downs passing	13	6
First downs penalty	2	0
Third down efficiency	2–14	1–10
Fourth down efficiency	2–5	0–1
Total plays–net yards	71–301	57–443
Rushing attempts–net yards	20–46	38–303
Yards per rush	2.3	8.0
Yards passing	255	140
Pass completions–attempts (percentage)	27–51 (53%)	10–19 (53%)
Interceptions thrown	2	0
Punt returns–total yards	1–0	0–0
Kickoff returns–total yards	1–17	2–27
Punts–average yardage	5–47.8	5–46.8
Fumbles–lost	0–0	0–0
Penalties–yards	5–30	5–45
Time of possession	30:44	29:16

Washington statistics
Huskies passing
Name	C–A	Yds	TD–INT
Michael Penix Jr.	27–51	255	1–2
Huskies rushing
Name	Car	Yds	TD
Dillon Johnson	11	33	0
Jalen McMillan	1	9	0
Will Nixon	2	7	0
Tybo Rodgers	1	2	0
Ja'Lynn Polk	1	1	0
Michael Penix Jr.	3	−5	0
Huskies receiving
Name	Rec	Yds	TD
Rome Odunze	5	87	0
Jack Westover	5	42	0
Ja'Lynn Polk	4	37	0
Jalen McMillan	6	33	1
Dillon Johnson	2	24	0
Devin Culp	1	14	0
Tybo Rodgers	1	11	0
Will Nixon	3	7	0

Michigan statistics
Wolverines passing
Name	C–A	Yds	TD–INT
J. J. McCarthy	10–18	140	0–0
Wolverines rushing
Name	Car	Yds	TD
Blake Corum	21	134	2
Donovan Edwards	6	104	2
J. J. McCarthy	4	31	0
Kalel Mullings	3	21	0
Alex Orji	2	15	0
Wolverines receiving
Name	Rec	Yds	TD
Colston Loveland	3	64	0
Roman Wilson	3	54	0
Cornelius Johnson	3	25	0
Semaj Morgan	1	−3	0

== Broadcasting ==
The game was televised in the United States on ESPN, with Megacast coverage across numerous other channels in the ESPN family. In addition to the main national broadcast on ESPN, the Megacast coverage featured Field Pass hosted by The Pat McAfee Show on ESPN2, the Command Center feed with multiple angles and live statistics on ESPNU, the Skycast on ESPNews, and a Spanish-language broadcast on ESPN Deportes. The game was televised in Canada on TSN. ESPN Radio carried the national radio broadcast of the game and the WatchESPN website and mobile application featured "Hometown Radio" feeds featuring each team's regular radio commentators.

In the United Kingdom, the game, along with ESPN's build-up to the game, was broadcast live on Sky Sports.

=== Commentary teams ===
The Saturday Night Football commentary team of Chris Fowler, Kirk Herbstreit, and Holly Rowe featured on the primary ESPN broadcast, with Molly McGrath joining Rowe as a sideline reporter. Bill Lemonnier, a former Big Ten referee, also featured as a rules analyst. The ESPN2 broadcast featured Pat McAfee, A.J. Hawk, Darius Butler, Anthony DiGuilio, Connor Campbell, and Ty Schmit. The ESPN Radio call featured play-by-play commentary from Sean McDonough, analysis from Greg McElroy, and sideline reporting from Ian Fitzsimmons and Kris Budden. The Spanish-language commentary team of Eduardo Varela, Pablo Viruega, Katia Castorena and Sebastian Christensen featured on the ESPN Deportes telecast, while ESPN Brazil's Portuguese-language broadcast featured Matheus Pinheiro, Weinny Eirado, Deivis Chiodini and Giane Pessoa. Michigan's "Hometown Radio" call featured Doug Karsch, Jon Jansen, and Jason Avant from the Michigan Sports Network while Washington's featured Tony Castricone, Cameron Cleeland, and Elise Woodward from the Washington Sports Network.

== Aftermath ==
Michigan's win gave them a 15–0 record to finish the season, making them the fourth NCAA FBS national champion to achieve the feat (after 2018 Clemson, 2019 LSU, and 2022 Georgia). Washington finished their final season as a member of the Pac-12 with a 14–1 record in what was one of the best seasons in program history.

Michigan running back Blake Corum and cornerback Will Johnson were named offensive and defensive MVPs, respectively.

A total of 72,808 people attended the game. The television broadcast of the game brought in 25 million viewers and peaked at 28 million; it was the most-watched national championship broadcast since 2020 and represented a 45% increase from viewership of the previous year's championship. It was the second-highest-viewed game of the season, behind the Michigan–Alabama Rose Bowl semi-final. As a whole, the 2023–24 playoff was the most viewed since the 2017–18 playoff, which featured a double-overtime Rose Bowl and an overtime national championship.

After Alabama head coach Nick Saban announced his retirement on January 10, Kalen DeBoer was hired by Alabama to replace him two days later. On January 14, Washington hired Arizona head coach Jedd Fisch to be DeBoer's successor. Another coaching change occurred on January 24, when Jim Harbaugh became the head coach of the Los Angeles Chargers. Following Harbaugh's departure, Michigan offensive coordinator Sherrone Moore, who was the team's acting head coach during Harbaugh's suspensions, was hired to succeed him on January 26. The departures of Saban, DeBoer, and Harbaugh left Texas head coach Steve Sarkisian as the only one of the four coaches in the 2023–24 College Football Playoff to remain with their team into the 2024 season.

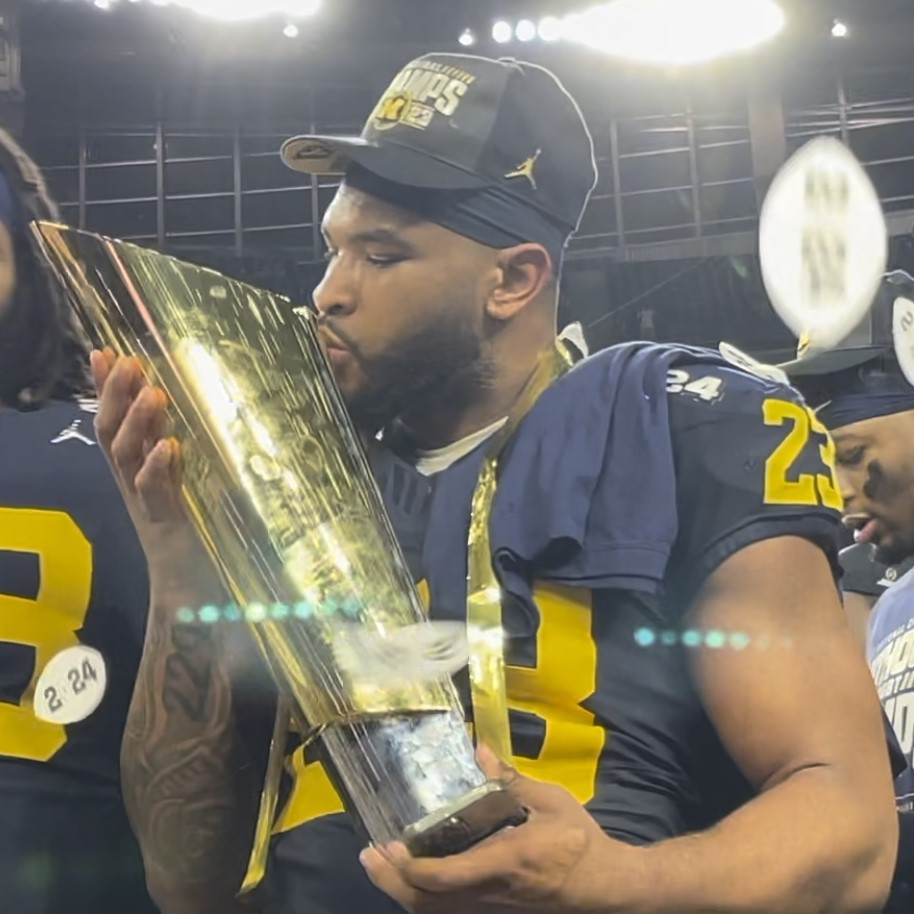
Michael Barrett kisses the national championship trophy

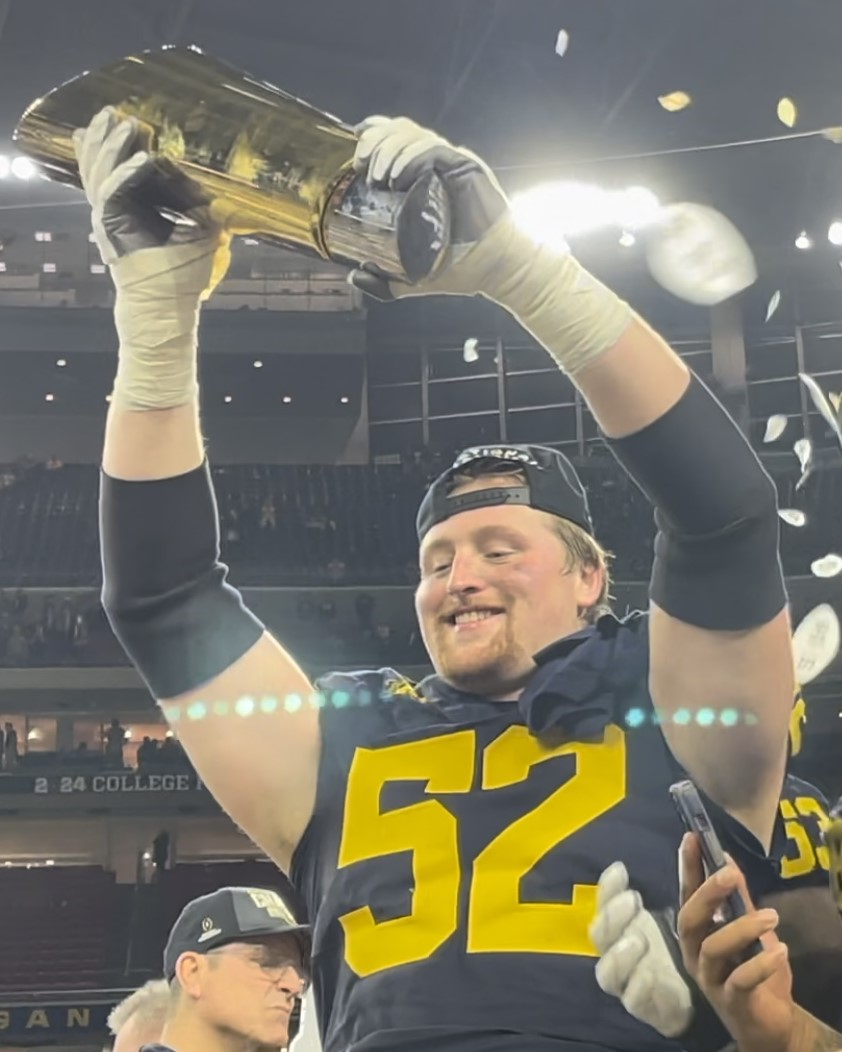
Karsen Barnhart hoists the national championship trophy.

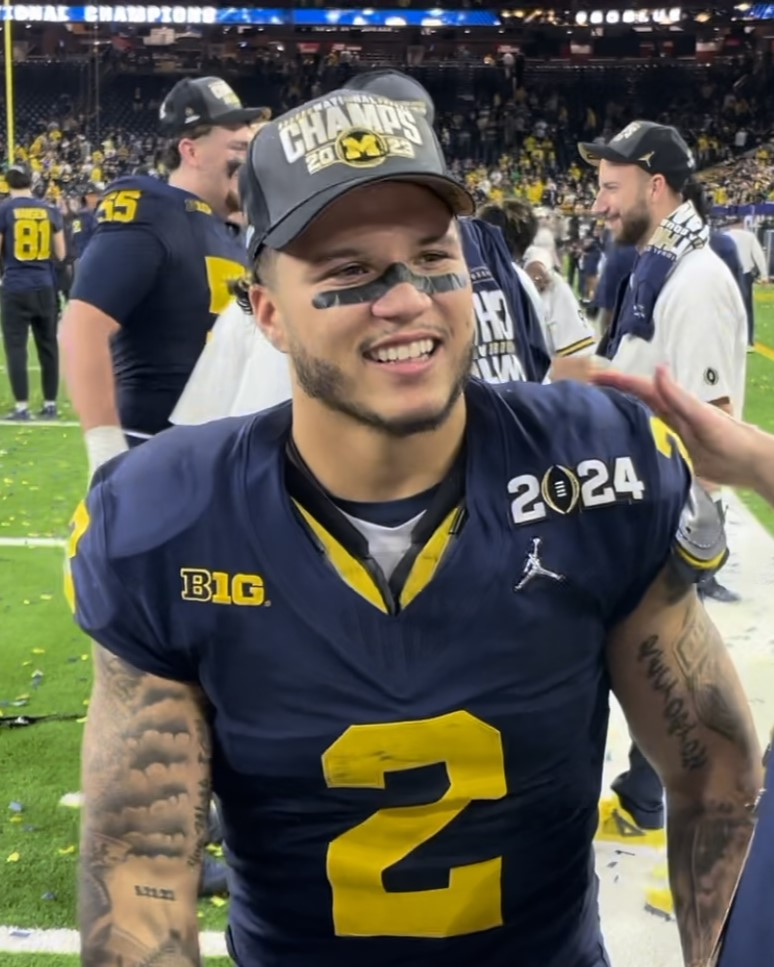
Blake Corum, offensive MVP, immediately after the game.

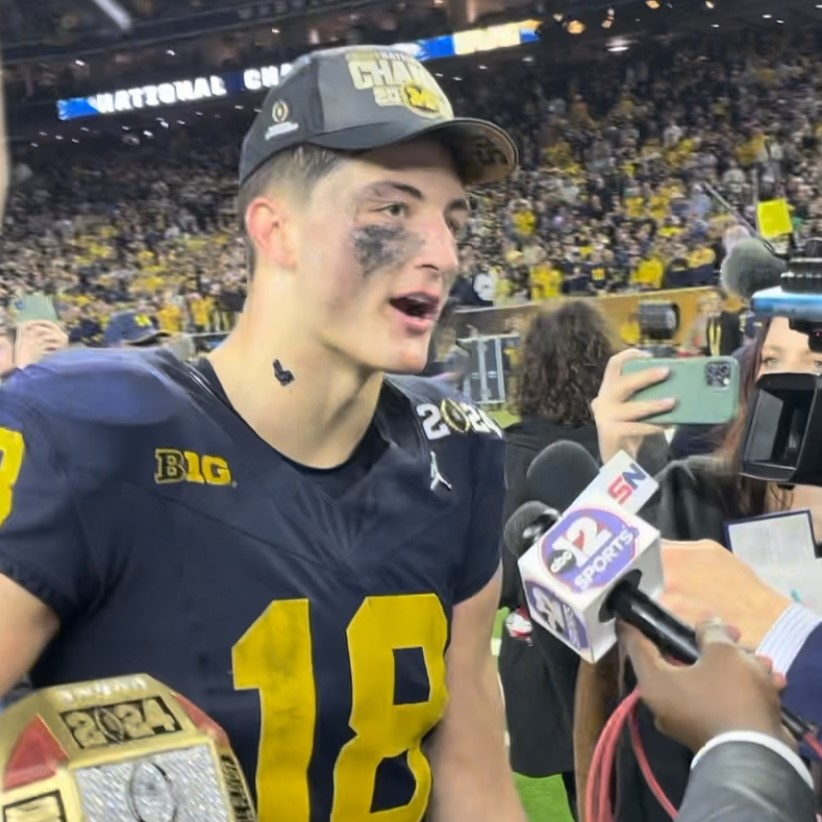
Coleston Loveland talking to media immediately after the game; under his arm is an oversized novelty championship ring.

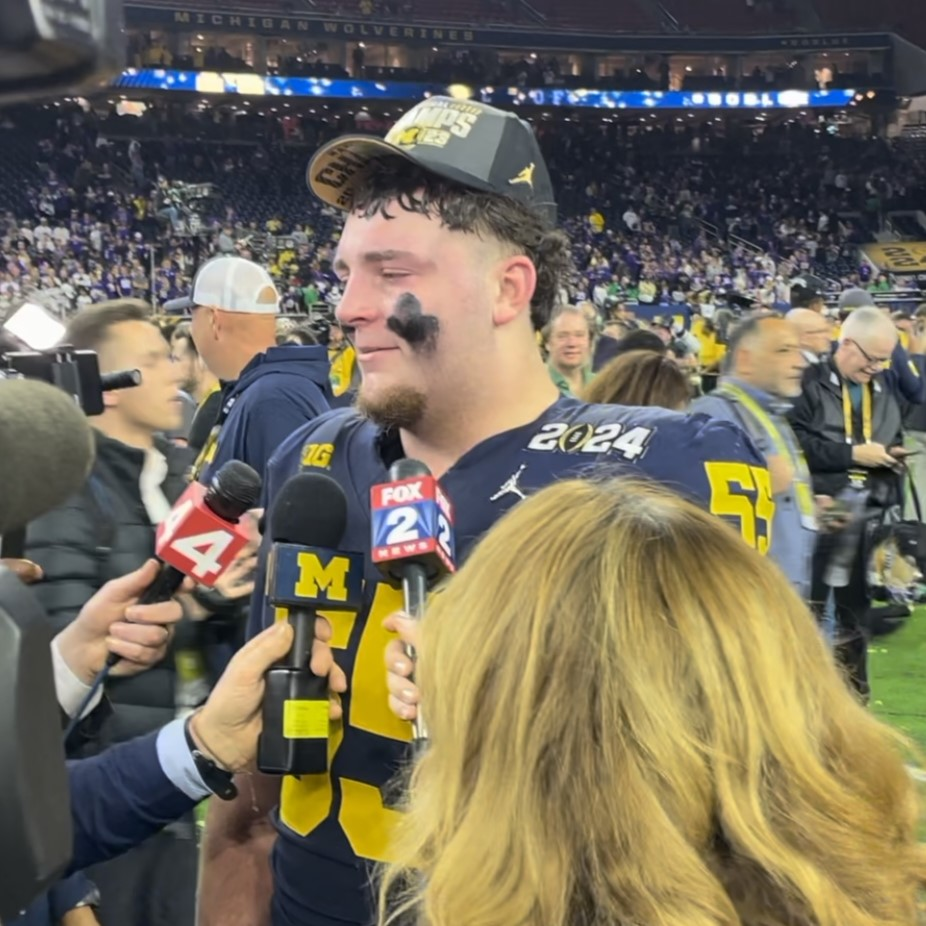
Mason Graham talking to media immediately after the game

J.J. McCarthy leaves the field of NRG Stadium, greeting fans and hugging WR Peyton O'Leary on his way out.

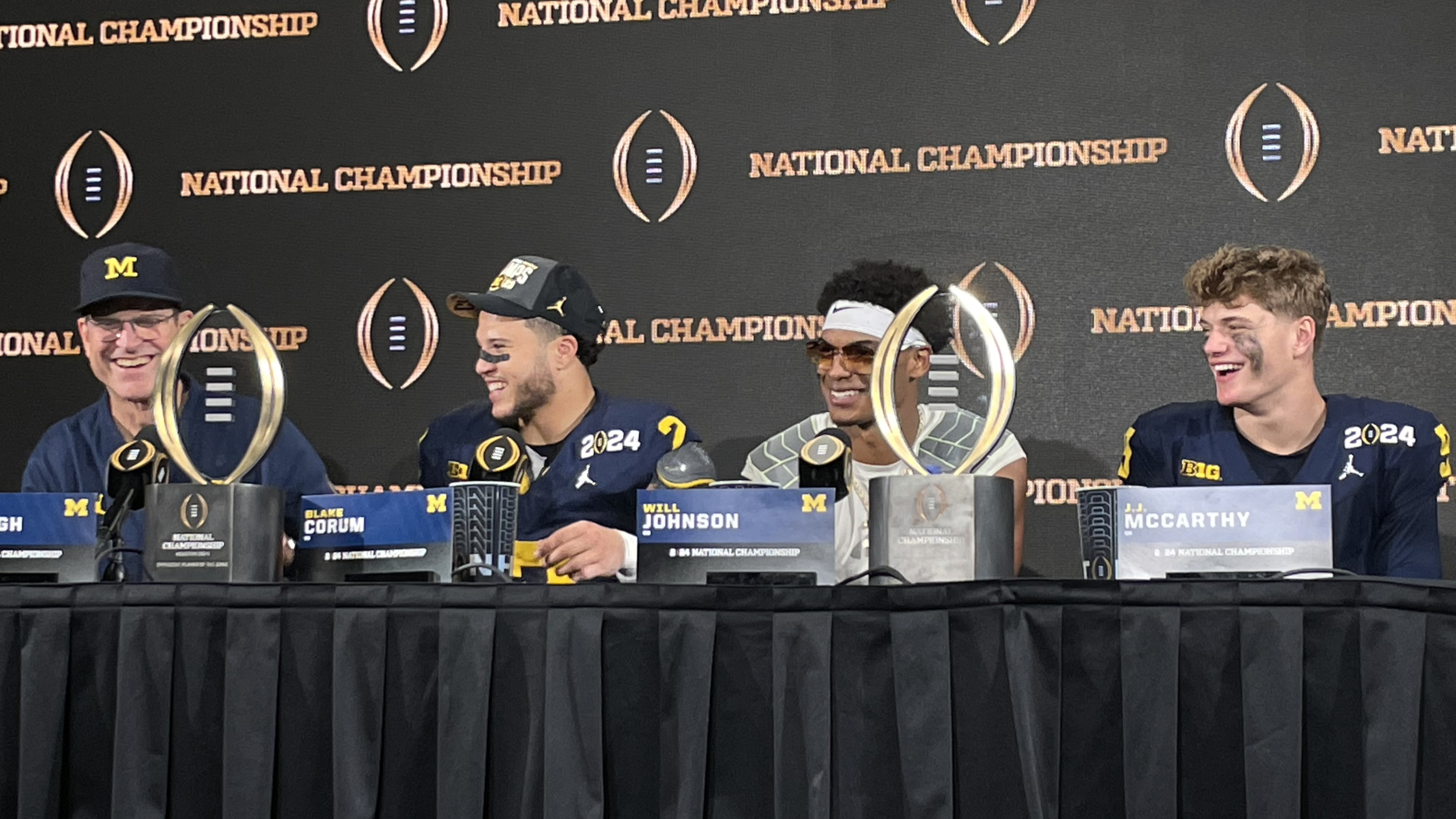
Michigan's post-game press conference with head coach Jim Harbaugh, offensive MVP Blake Corum, defensive MVP Will Johnson, and J.J. McCarthy.

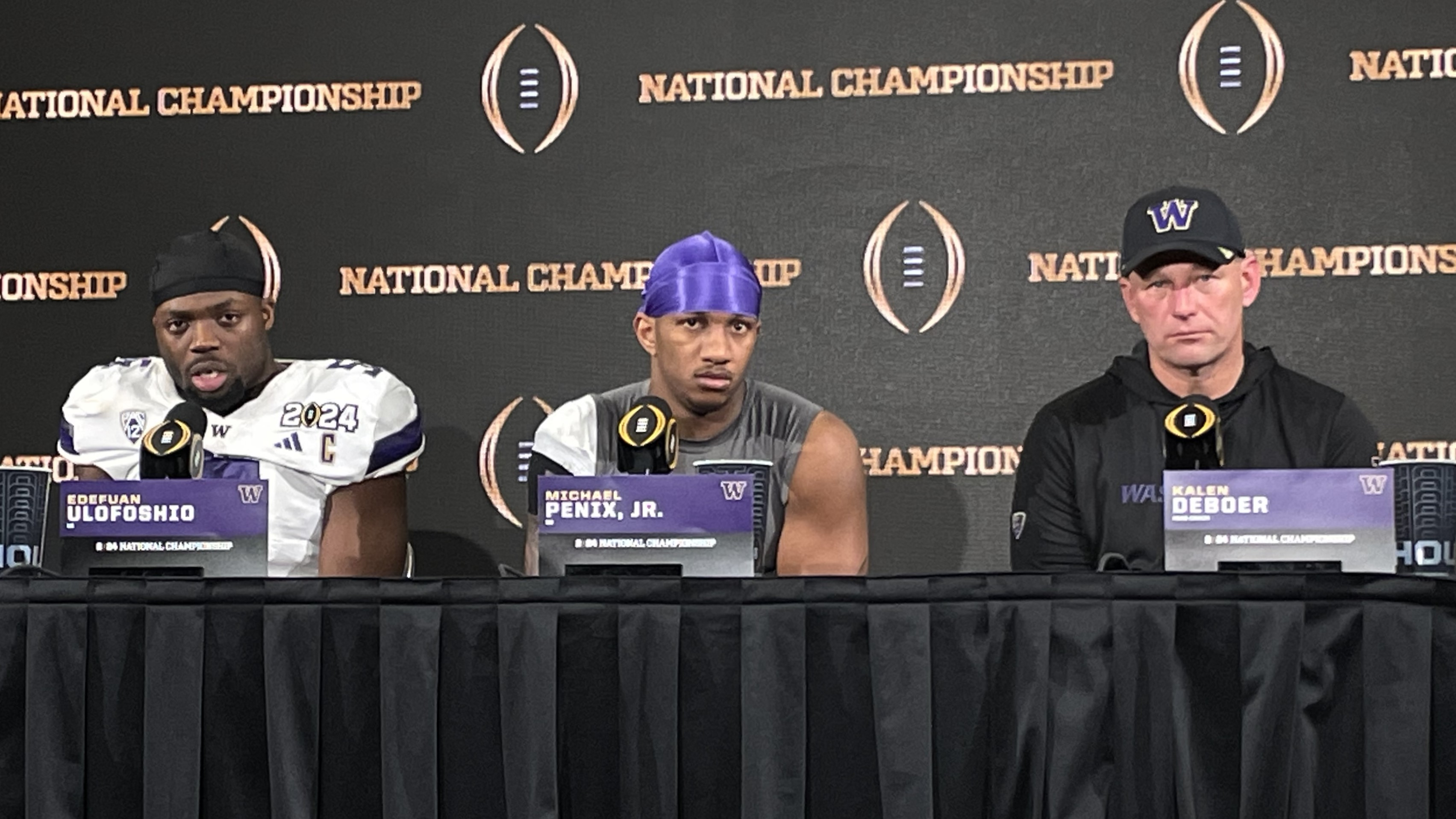
Washington's post-game press conference with Edefuan Ulofoshio, Michael Penix Jr., and head coach Kalen DeBoer.

== See also ==
- College football national championships in NCAA Division I FBS
