= Michael Barrett (American football) =

American football player (born 1999)

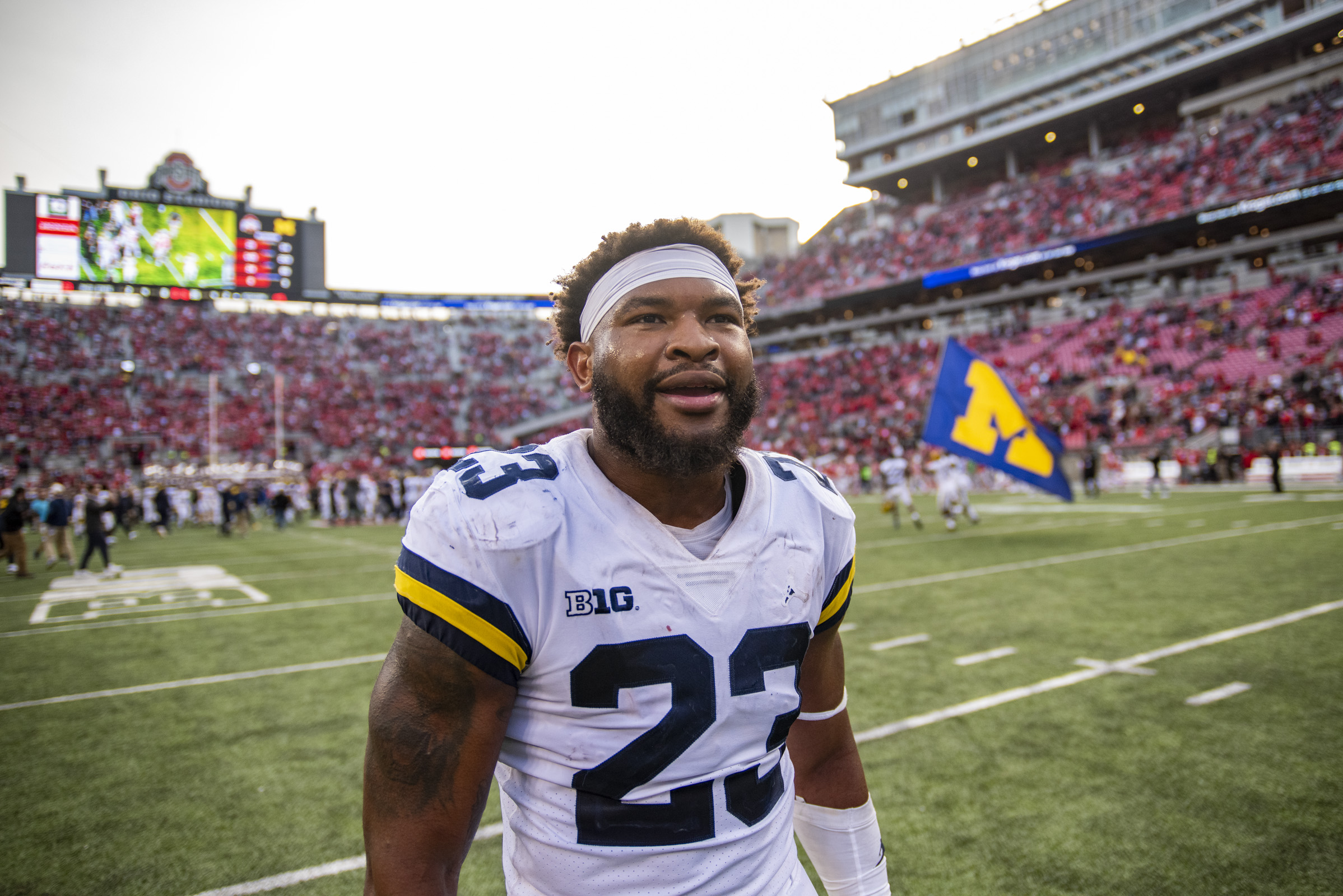
- Barrett with the Michigan Wolverines in 2022

Profile
- Position: Linebacker

Personal information
- Born: December 21, 1999 (age 26); Valdosta, Georgia, U.S.
- Listed height: 5 ft 11 in (1.80 m)
- Listed weight: 232 lb (105 kg)

Career information
- High school: Lowndes (Valdosta)
- College: Michigan (2018–2023)
- NFL draft: 2024: 7th round, 240th overall pick

Career history
- Carolina Panthers (2024)*; Seattle Seahawks (2024)*; Cleveland Browns (2024)*; Green Bay Packers (2024); Las Vegas Raiders (2025)*; Birmingham Stallions (2026)*; St. Louis Battlehawks (2026); Baltimore Ravens (2026)*
- * Offseason or practice squad member only

Awards and highlights
- CFP national champion (2023); 2× third-team All-Big Ten (2022, 2023)
- Stats at Pro Football Reference

Michael Barrett Jr. (born December 21, 1999) is an American professional football linebacker. He played college football for the Michigan Wolverines, winning three consecutive Big Ten Conference titles and a national championship in 2023. Barrett was twice named All-Big Ten. He was selected by the Carolina Panthers in the 2024 NFL draft.

== Early life ==
Barrett was born in Valdosta, Georgia where he attended high school at Lowndes. In Barrett's senior season, he was named Georgia's Class 7A Player of the Year.

As a junior, Barrett went 132-of-213 passing for 2,753 yards and 27 touchdowns; adding 1,283 rushing yards and 21 TDs on the ground. In Barrett's senior season, he completed 110 of his 156 passes for 1,705 yards and 16 touchdowns, with two interceptions, while also adding 1,195 yards and 13 touchdowns on the ground.

Barrett committed to play college football at the University of Michigan; over schools such as Georgia Tech, LSU, Nebraska, and Michigan State.

== College career ==
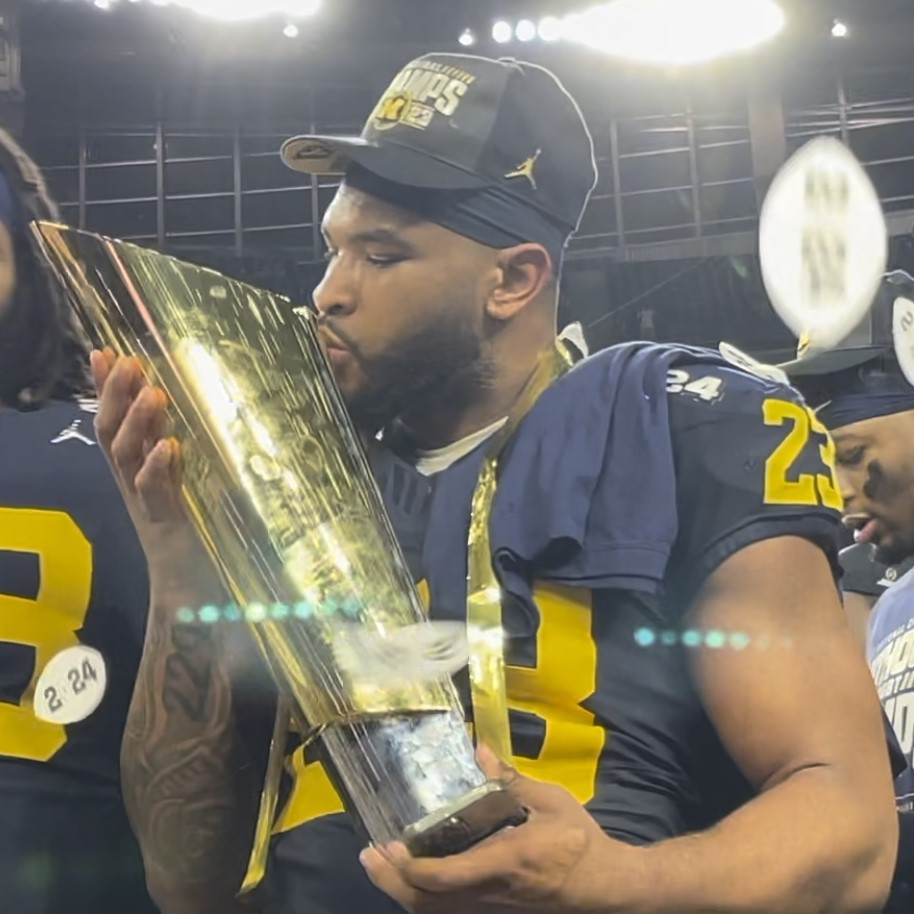
Barrett kisses the trophy after the Wolverines won the 2024 CFP National Championship.

In 2018 Barrett enrolled at the University of Michigan. In his first season, he appeared in two games, recording no statistics. In 2019, he played mostly on special teams, playing in 11 games tallying 7 tackles.

In the COVID-19 shortened 2020 season, Barrett started all 6 games, recording 44 tackles, 2 tackles for a loss, a sack and a forced fumble, also taking a kickoff back 66 yards. Barrett's first career sack came in his first career start on October 24, 2020, versus Minnesota.

In the 2021 season, Barrett started one game, recording 20 tackles, 1.5 tackles for a loss, a sack and a pass deflection.

On October 8, 2022, Barrett totaled 7 tackles and a crucial sack, as he helped Michigan survive and defeat the Indiana Hoosiers. On November 5, 2022, Barrett recorded his first career interception, picking off two passes, and returning one for a touchdown, in a win over Rutgers.

Barrett finished his breakout 2022 season starting 14 games, with 72 tackles, five tackles for a loss, 3.5 sacks, 2 interceptions and 3 pass deflections. Barrett was named Third-team All-Big Ten.

Barrett returned to the Wolverines for the 2023 season, his final season of eligibility. Barrett opened the season as one of Michigan's six team captains. Barrett won a national championship with Michigan in 2023, and earned a third-team All-Big Ten selection, making him a two-time All-Big Ten selection. Barrett started all 15 games, finishing his final season with 65 tackles, 3 sacks, and 3 forced fumbles.

Barrett finished his University of Michigan career as the all-time winningest player in team history, ending with a career record of 61–14 in his six seasons, 2018 to 2023.

== Professional career ==
Pre-draft measurables
Height	Weight	Arm length	Hand span	Wingspan	40-yard dash	10-yard split	20-yard split	20-yard shuttle	Vertical jump
5 ft 11 3/8 in (1.81 m)	233 lb (106 kg)	32 1/8 in (0.82 m)	8 1/2 in (0.22 m)	6 ft 6 in (1.98 m)	4.70 s	1.64 s	2.70 s	4.55 s	31.0 in (0.79 m)
All values from NFL Combine/Pro Day

=== Carolina Panthers ===
Barrett was selected in the seventh round, 240th overall, by the Carolina Panthers in the 2024 NFL draft.

=== Seattle Seahawks ===
On August 22, 2024, the Panthers traded Barrett to the Seattle Seahawks in exchange for cornerback Mike Jackson. He was waived on August 27, and re-signed to the practice squad. He was released on September 10.

=== Cleveland Browns ===
On September 12, 2024, Barrett was signed to the Cleveland Browns practice squad. He was released on October 8.

=== Green Bay Packers ===
On November 30, 2024, the Green Bay Packers signed Barrett to the practice squad. He was elevated for the team's Week 18 matchup against the Chicago Bears on January 5, 2025.

=== Las Vegas Raiders ===
On May 21, 2025, Barrett signed with the Las Vegas Raiders. He was waived on August 25.

=== Birmingham Stallions ===
On October 3, 2025, Barrett signed with the Birmingham Stallions of the United Football League (UFL).

=== St. Louis Battlehawks ===
On January 27, 2026, Barrett signed with the St. Louis Battlehawks. Barrett recorded 10 tackles and a sack in 7 games for the Battlehawks in the 2026 season.

=== Baltimore Ravens ===
On August 26, 2026, Barrett signed with the Baltimore Ravens. On August 30, Barrett was waived by the Ravens.
