= Will Johnson (cornerback) =

American football player (born 2003)

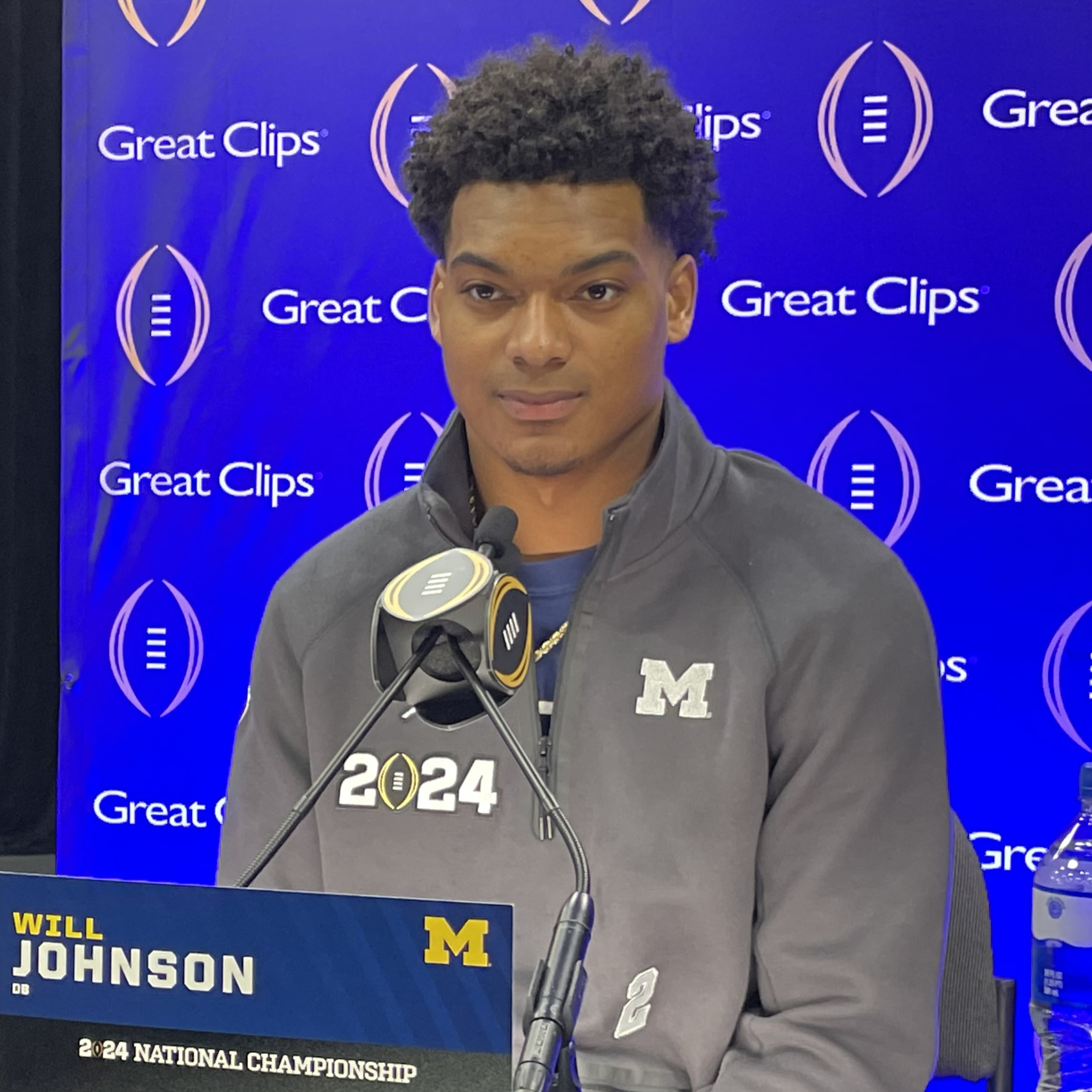
- Johnson with the Michigan Wolverines in 2024

No. 2 – Arizona Cardinals
- Position: Cornerback
- Roster status: Injured reserve

Personal information
- Born: March 29, 2003 (age 23); Detroit, Michigan, U.S.
- Listed height: 6 ft 2 in (1.88 m)
- Listed weight: 200 lb (91 kg)

Career information
- High school: Grosse Pointe South (Grosse Pointe Farms, Michigan)
- College: Michigan (2022–2024)
- NFL draft: 2025: 2nd round, 47th overall pick

Career history
- Arizona Cardinals (2025–present)

Awards and highlights
- PFWA All-Rookie Team (2025); CFP national champion (2023); CFP National Championship Game Defensive MVP (2024); First-team All-American (2023); Second-team All-American (2024); Freshman All-American (2022); First-team All-Big Ten (2023); Second-team All-Big Ten (2024)

Career NFL statistics as of 2025
- Tackles: 37
- Forced fumbles: 1
- Pass deflections: 10
- Stats at Pro Football Reference

William Deon Johnson (born March 29, 2003) is an American professional football cornerback for the Arizona Cardinals of the National Football League (NFL). He was a two-time All-American playing college football for the Michigan Wolverines. In 2023, he won the national championship and earned its defensive MVP award. Johnson was selected by the Cardinals in the second round of the 2025 NFL draft.

== Early life ==
Johnson was born in Detroit, Michigan on March 29, 2003, the son of Deon Johnson and Kafi Kumasi. His father, Deon, was a cornerback for the Michigan Wolverines in the 1990s. Johnson attended Grosse Pointe South High School, playing football as a cornerback, wide receiver and punt returner. As a senior, he was an all-state selection on defense, recording 45 tackles, a sack, an interception and 12 pass breakups. On offense, he totaled 1,302 all-purpose yards, receiving, rushing and returning punts, including catching 42 passes for 667 yards with six touchdowns.

William was rated as a five-star player and the No. 1 player in Michigan by 247Sports, ESPN and Rivals. 247Sports gave Johnson a composite ranking as the No. 15 overall ranked player in the country in the 2022 college football recruiting class. On February 28, 2021, Johnson committed to the University of Michigan. He also held offers from Ohio State, USC, Oklahoma and Texas A&M, amongst others. He was one of the first Michigan recruits to benefit from the new rule allowing players to be compensated for the use of their name, image and likeness (NIL).

== College career ==
=== Freshman season (2022) ===
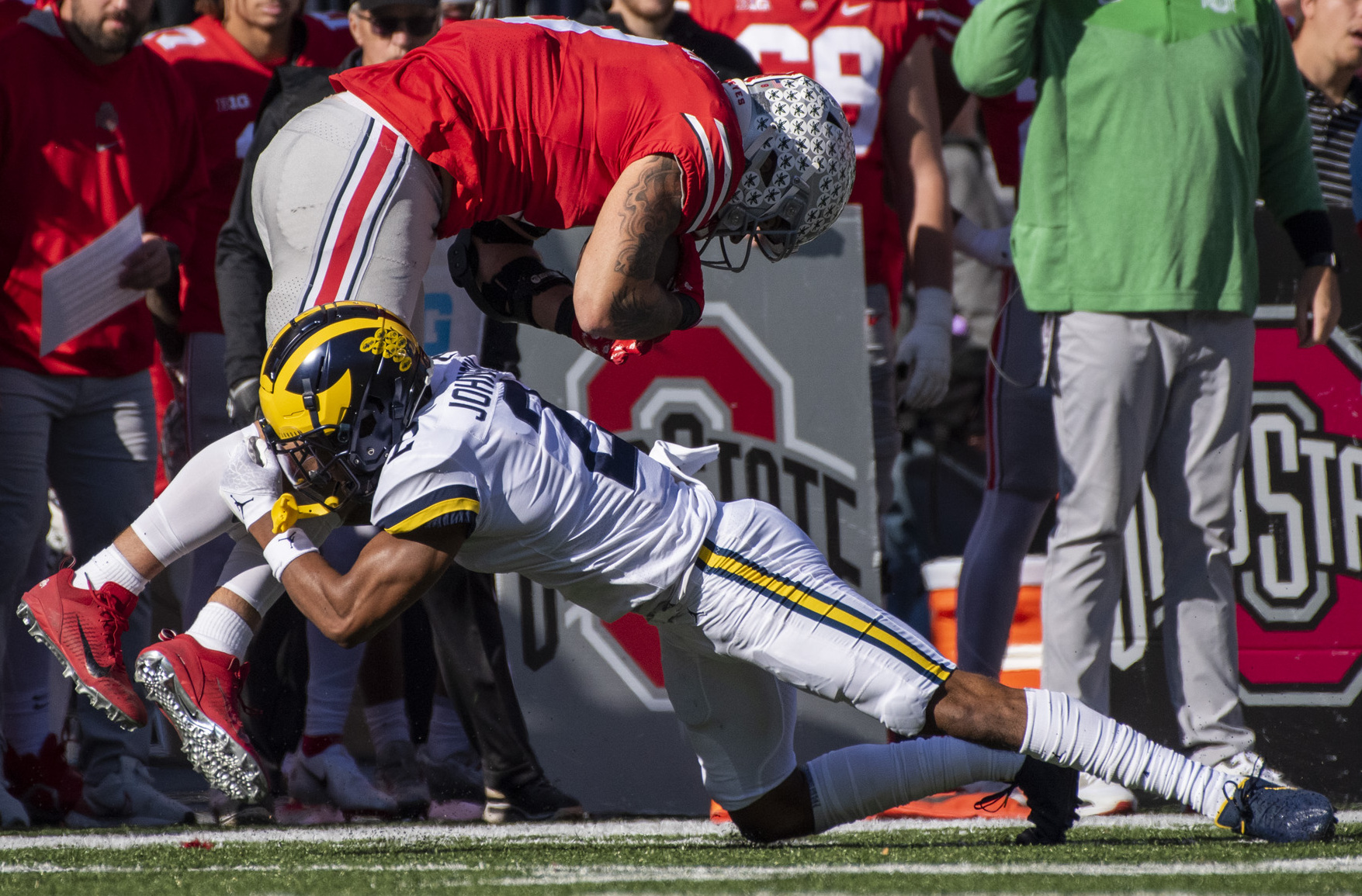
Johnson making a tackle against the Ohio State Buckeyes in a 45–23 victory in 2022

Johnson enrolled early at the University of Michigan in January 2022, and participated in winter conditioning. He impressed in spring practice and was described as being in position to play early in the fall of 2022. Johnson became a starter as a true freshman. In total, he appeared in all 14 games, recording 27 tackles and three interceptions. Johnson recorded his first career interception versus Rutgers, and had a two interception performance in the Big Ten Championship Game victory versus Purdue.

Following his first season, Johnson was named team defensive freshman of the year, along with Mason Graham, and selected to the True Freshman All-America team by 247Sports and Pro Football Focus.

=== Sophomore season (2023) ===
In 2023, Johnson was named to the Jim Thorpe Award watch list. In total, Johnson started 12 games for the Wolverines, missing three due to injury. Johnson allowed only 17 receptions on 321 coverage snaps, including zero receptions for touchdowns. He finished the 2023 season with the second lowest QB rating when targeted in college football, adding 27 tackles and four interceptions.

Johnson scored his first career touchdown on an interception versus Minnesota. In the victory against Ohio State, Johnson recorded an interception while defending Marvin Harrison Jr. His most notorious interception came on a ball thrown by Washington quarterback Michael Penix Jr. on the first play of the second half in the national championship game. This helped seal a national title for the Wolverines, and earned Johnson the National Championship Defensive MVP Award.

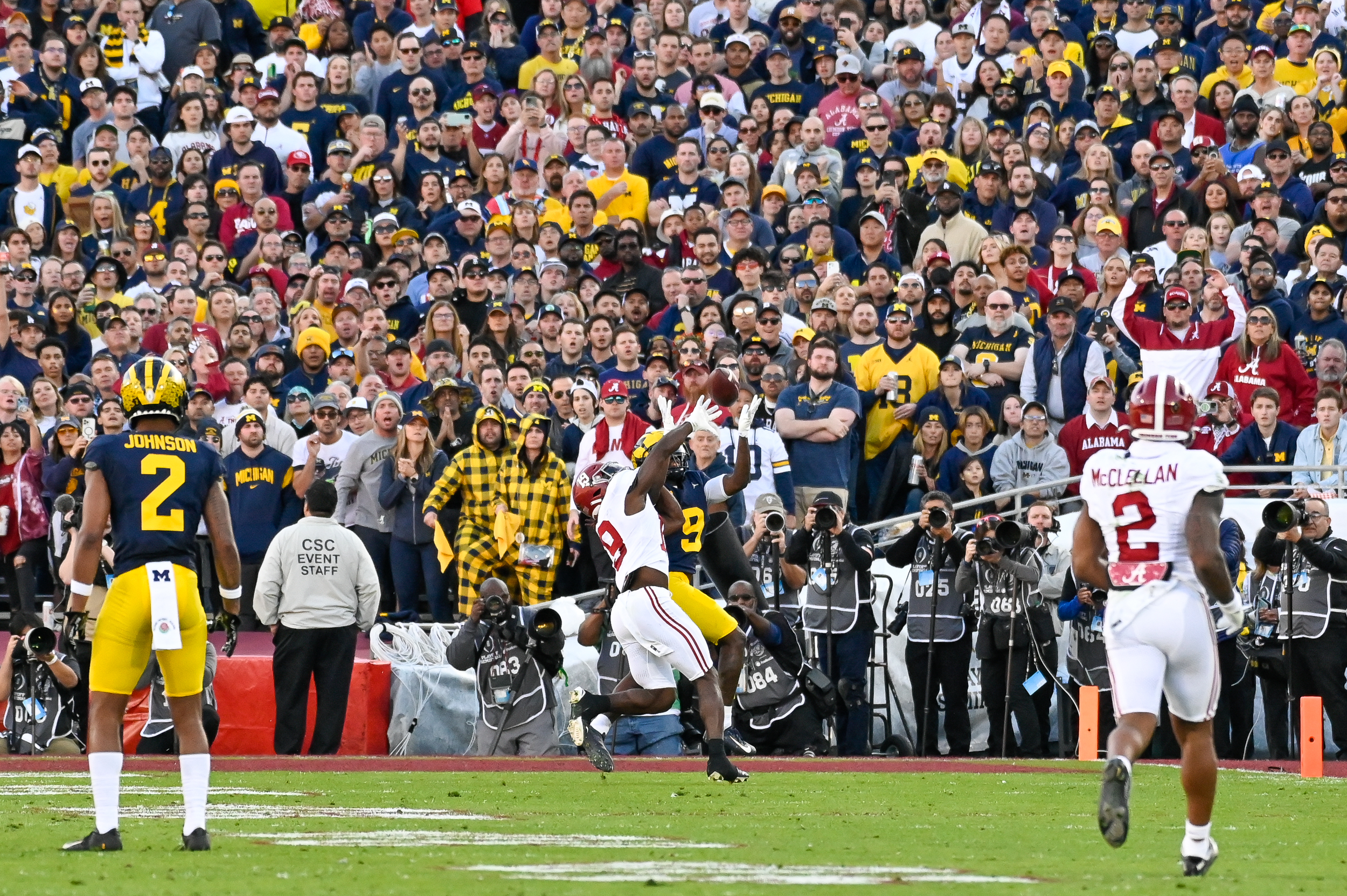
Johnson (left) in the 2024 Rose Bowl against the Alabama Crimson Tide

Following the season, Johnson was a consensus first-team All-Big Ten selection and a first-team All-American by Sports Illustrated. He was also selected as a second-team All-American by USA Today.

=== Junior season (2024) ===
Entering his junior season, Johnson was ranked as the best cornerback in college football by members of the media. He was widely considered to be an early first round pick in the 2025 NFL draft. In his first game of the season versus Fresno State, Johnson recorded three tackles and had an 86-yard interception returned for a touchdown to secure a win. In week four against the USC Trojans, Johnson returned his second interception of the season for a 42-yard touchdown. In doing so, he became the first player in Michigan football history to return three career interceptions for touchdowns.

After the USC game, Johnson missed the next game against Minnesota with a shoulder contusion. He returned the following week in game six versus Washington, before exiting the game with an injury and missing the second half in the loss to the Huskies. Johnson did not play the remainder of the season with a turf toe injury. Following the season, he was named a second-team All-American, finishing the year with 14 tackles and two interceptions returned for touchdowns.

On December 11, Johnson declared for the 2025 NFL draft, foregoing the ReliaQuest Bowl and his senior season. He finished his career at the University of Michigan with a 35-6 team record, two Big Ten championships, All-American honors twice and was a national champion (including being the game’s defensive MVP). In his three years, Johnson appeared in 32 games, recording 68 tackles, 19 passes defended and nine interceptions (including three returned for touchdowns).

== Professional career ==
Pre-draft measurables
Height	Weight	Arm length	Hand span	Wingspan
6 ft 1 3/4 in (1.87 m)	194 lb (88 kg)	30 1/8 in (0.77 m)	9 1/8 in (0.23 m)	6 ft 3 7/8 in (1.93 m)
All values from NFL Combine

Johnson was selected by the Arizona Cardinals with the 47th overall pick in the second round of the 2025 NFL draft. Once a projected top ten pick, Johnson slid into the second round due to injury concerns after missing the majority of his junior season, in addition to being unable to test at the NFL combine and Pro Day. Even though Johnson was hindered by injuries in his rookie season, his play in 12 games was good enough to be recognized as the top rookie cornerback by the PFWA's All-Rookie team.

On September 21, 2026, it was announced that Johnson had suffered a season–ending neck injury during the team's Week 2 loss to the Seattle Seahawks.

== NFL career statistics ==
=== Regular season ===
Year	Team	Games		Tackles					Interceptions						Fumbles				
Year	Team	GP	GS	Cmb	Solo	Ast	Sck	TFL	Int	Yds	Avg	Lng	TD	PD	FF	Fmb	FR	Yds	TD
2025	ARI	12	10	37	27	10	0.0	2	0	0	0.0	0	0	9	1	0	0	0	0
Career		12	10	37	27	10	0.0	2	0	0	0.0	0	0	10	1	0	0	0	0
