= Mike Sainristil =

Haitian American football player (born 2000)

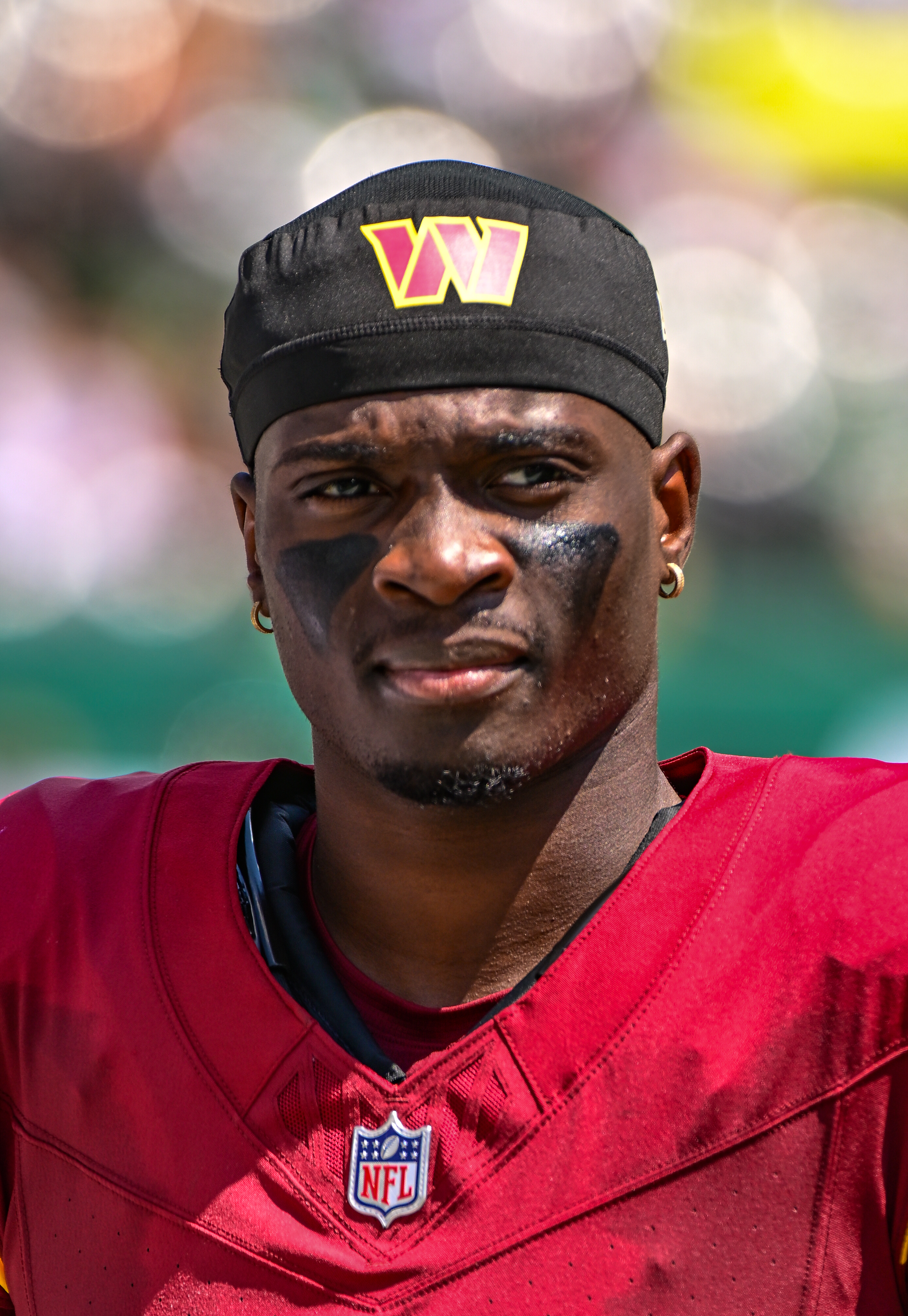
- Sainristil with the Washington Commanders in 2024

No. 0 – Washington Commanders
- Position: Cornerback
- Roster status: Active

Personal information
- Born: October 3, 2000 (age 26); Port-au-Prince, Haiti
- Listed height: 5 ft 10 in (1.78 m)
- Listed weight: 182 lb (83 kg)

Career information
- High school: Everett (Everett, Massachusetts, U.S.)
- College: Michigan (2019–2023)
- NFL draft: 2024: 2nd round, 50th overall pick

Career history
- Washington Commanders (2024–present)

Awards and highlights
- CFP national champion (2023); First-team All-American (2023)

Career NFL statistics as of Week 10, 2026
- Tackles: 196
- Forced fumbles: 2
- Fumble recoveries: 1
- Pass deflections: 26
- Interceptions: 6
- Stats at Pro Football Reference

Mike Sainristil (/ˈmaɪki ˈseɪnrɪstɪl/ MY-kee SANE-rih-stil; born October 3, 2000) is a Haitian American professional football cornerback for the Washington Commanders of the National Football League (NFL). He played college football for the Michigan Wolverines, winning the 2023 national championship prior to being selected by the Commanders in the second round of the 2024 NFL draft.

== Early life ==
Sainristil was born on October 3, 2000, in Port-au-Prince, Haiti. He and his family left the country when he was seven months old after his father, a radio station director, received threats following the 2000 Haitian presidential election. The family settled in Everett, Massachusetts, where Sainristil later attended Everett High School. As a senior, Sainristil was named Massachusetts' 2018 Gatorade Player of the Year after 30 receptions for 762 yards and 12 touchdowns as a wide receiver with six interceptions as a defensive back, helping Everett reach the Division 1 North Sectional semifinals. He concluded his high school career with 28 receiving touchdowns.

== College career ==
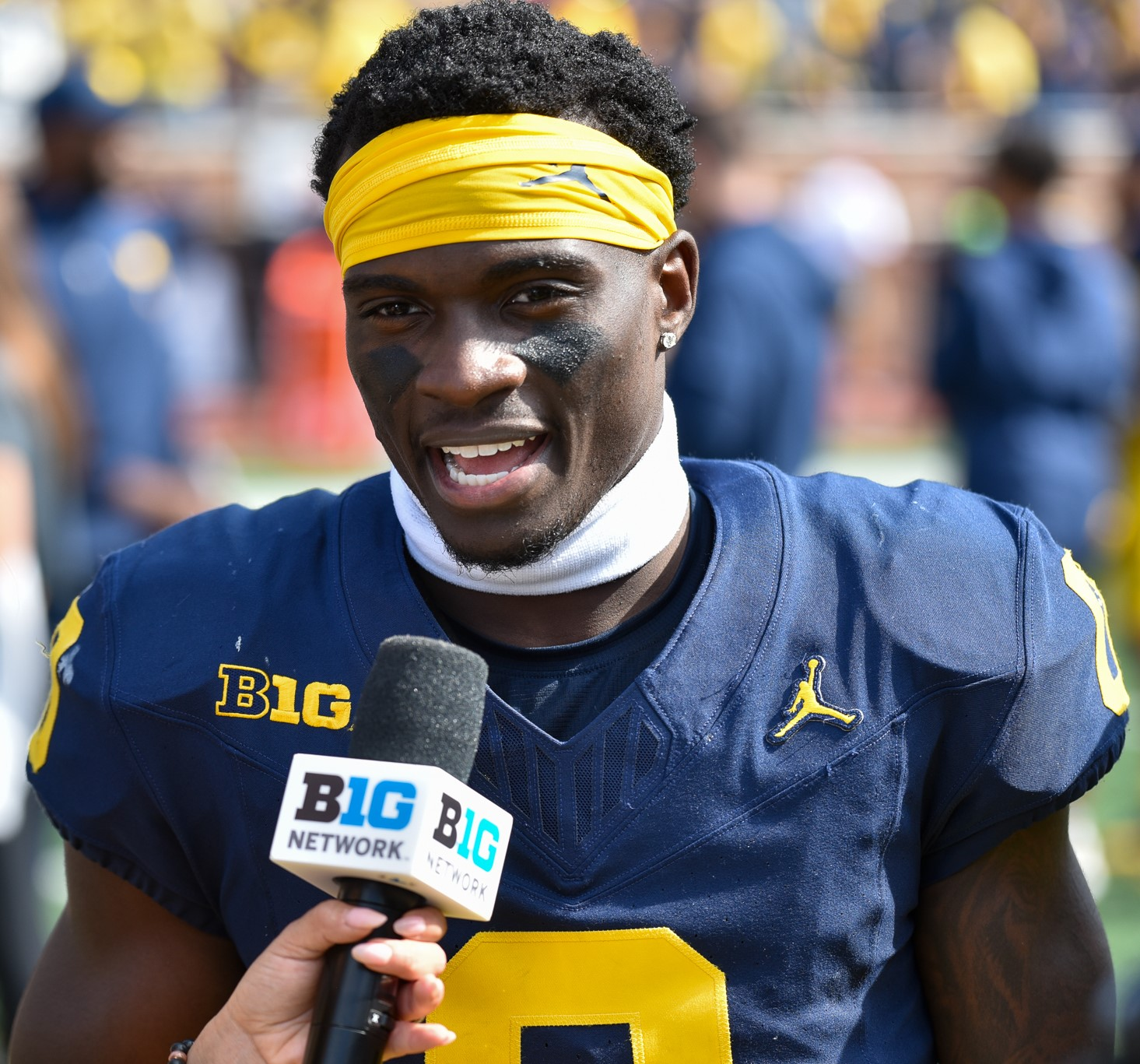
Sainristil with the Michigan Wolverines in 2023

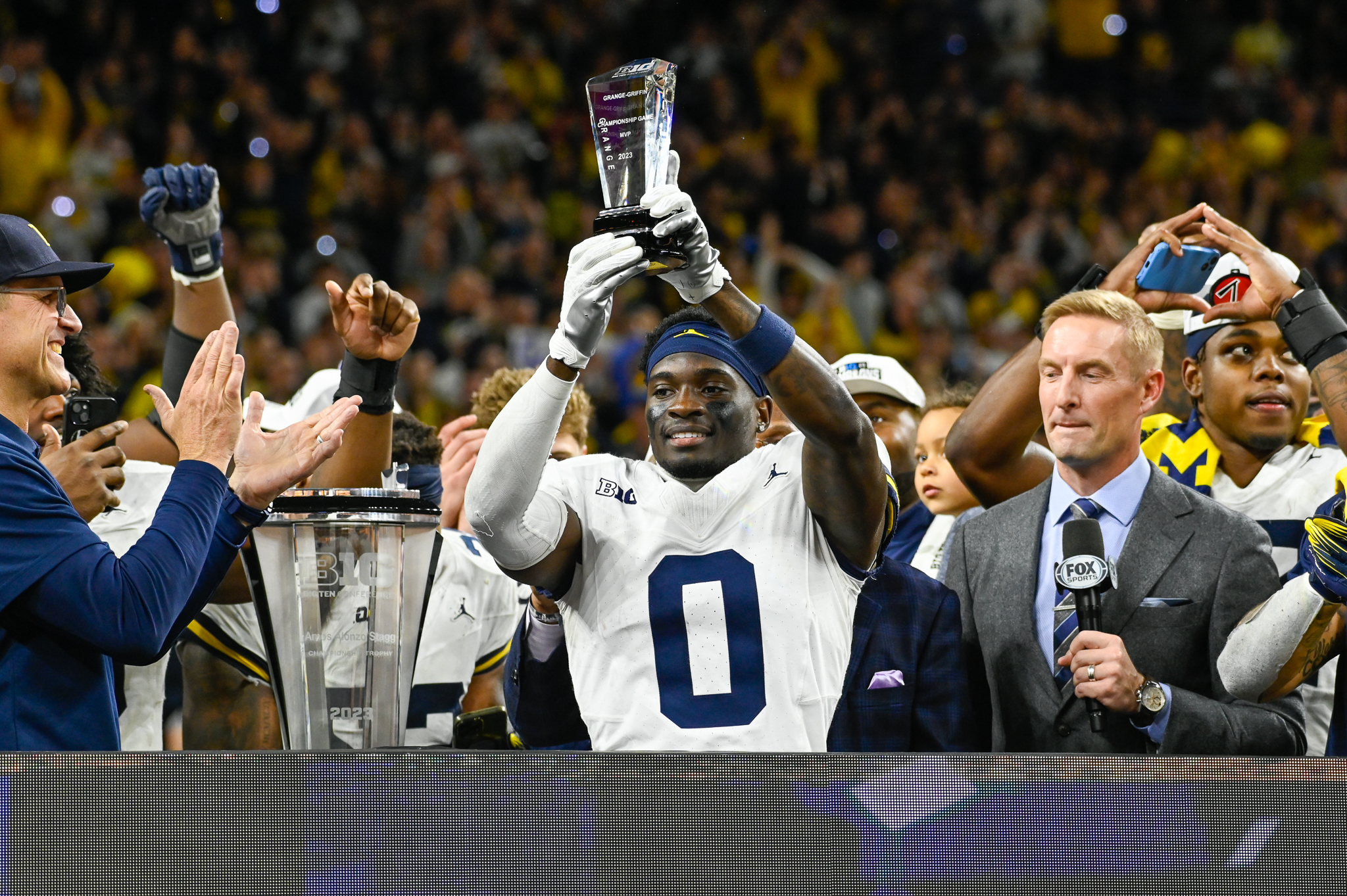
Sainristil after winning the 2023 Big Ten Championship Game MVP award

In November 2018, Sainristil committed to play college football for the Wolverines at the University of Michigan. He enrolled early and turned heads in Michigan's 2019 spring practice. Michigan's defensive coaches sought to use him as a cornerback, but the offensive staff won out in having him as a wide receiver. Despite his strong showing in spring practice, Sainristil saw limited time as a true freshman, catching eight passes for 145 yards and his first collegiate touchdown against Notre Dame, on October 26, 2019, totaling 73 yards in the game. With the departure of receivers Donovan Peoples-Jones, Tarik Black, and Nico Collins, Sainristil played a larger role in Michigan's offense during the 2020 and 2021 season.

In 2022, Sainristil moved to cornerback. He finished his first collegiate season on defense with 58 tackles, 6.5 tackles for loss, 2 sacks, 7 pass breakups and his first career interception on a pass throw by Max Duggan in the Fiesta Bowl. He was named All-Big Ten honorable mention following the season. In 2023, Sainristil was voted a captain for a second consecutive season. He was named a first-team All-American by The Sporting News, ESPN and FOX, finishing the season with 44 tackles, 1 sack, 6 interceptions, 2 returned for touchdowns and 2 forced fumbles. Sainristil was named the MVP of the 2023 Big Ten Championship Game and recorded the game-clinching interception in the 2024 College Football Playoff National Championship, intercepting Michael Penix Jr. and returning it 81 yards.

== Professional career ==
Pre-draft measurables
Height	Weight	Arm length	Hand span	Wingspan	40-yard dash	10-yard split	20-yard split	20-yard shuttle	Three-cone drill	Vertical jump	Broad jump	Bench press
5 ft 9 3/8 in (1.76 m)	182 lb (83 kg)	30 7/8 in (0.78 m)	8 1/2 in (0.22 m)	6 ft 2 1/2 in (1.89 m)	4.47 s	1.51 s	2.58 s	4.01 s	6.95 s	40 in (1.02 m)	10 ft 11 in (3.33 m)	14 reps
All values from NFL Combine/Pro Day

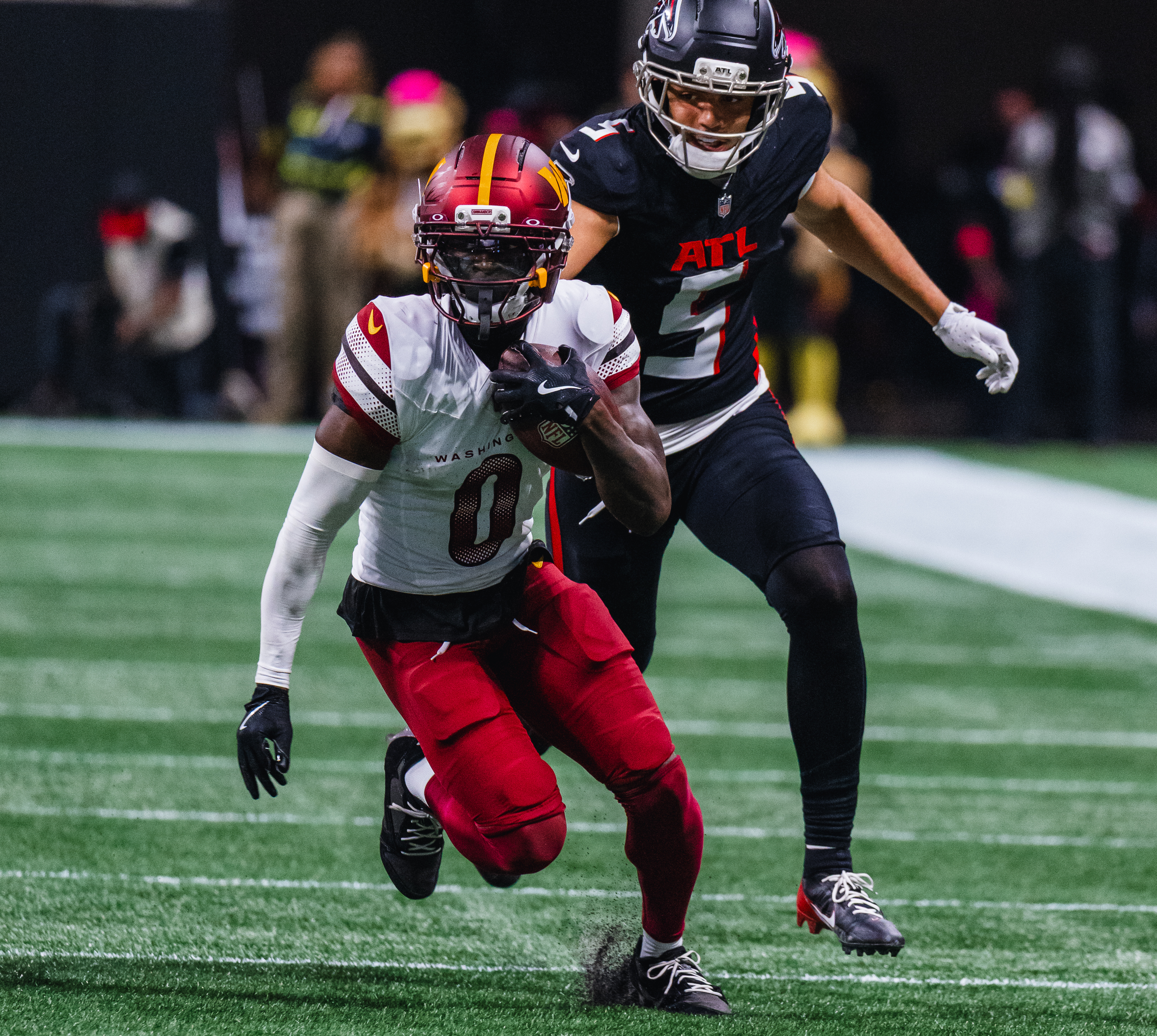
Sainristil with the Washington Commanders returning an interception against the Atlanta Falcons in 2025

Sainristil was selected by the Washington Commanders in the second round (50th overall) of the 2024 NFL draft. He signed his four-year rookie contract on June 11, 2024. Sainristil recorded his first career interception in Week 6 against the Baltimore Ravens. He forced and recovered his first fumble in Week 13 against the Tennessee Titans, becoming the third rookie in team history to have done both in a single game. Sainristil was named the Pepsi NFL Rookie of the Week after recording 10 tackles and 3 pass breakups in the regular season finale, finishing the season as the team's leader in interceptions with two. He finished the 2024 regular season with 93 tackles, 14 pass deflections, two interceptions, a forced fumble, and a fumble recovery. In the Divisional Round playoff game against the Detroit Lions, he recorded two interceptions that helped advanced the Commanders to the NFC Championship Game.

At the start of the 2025 season, Sainristil was named the starting nickelback with Marshon Lattimore and Trey Amos starting on the outside. In Week 4, he recorded his first interception of the season against Atlanta Falcons quarterback, Michael Penix Jr. Following Amos suffering a season-ending injury in Week 10, Sainristil was moved again back outside for the rest of the season. At the end of the 2025 season, he led the team with four interceptions.

== Career statistics ==
=== NFL ===
Legend
	Led the league
**Bold**	Career high

==== Regular season ====
Year	Team	Games		Tackles					Interceptions					Fumbles				
Year	Team	GP	GS	Cmb	Solo	Ast	Sck	TFL	Int	Yds	Lng	TD	PD	FF	Fmb	FR	Yds	TD
2024	WAS	17	16	**93**	**62**	31	0.0	**1**	2	38	38	0	**14**	**1**	0	**1**	0	0
2025	WAS	17	14	85	51	**34**	0.0	**1**	**4**	**78**	**55**	0	12	**1**	**1**	0	0	0
2026	WAS	9	2	18	15	3	0.0	**1**	0	0	0	0	0	0	0	0	0	0
Career		44	32	196	128	68	0.0	3	6	116	55	0	26	2	1	1	0	0

==== Postseason ====
Year	Team	Games		Tackles					Interceptions					Fumbles				
Year	Team	GP	GS	Cmb	Solo	Ast	Sck	TFL	Int	Yds	Lng	TD	PD	FF	Fmb	FR	Yds	TD
2024	WAS	3	3	11	8	3	0.0	0	2	22	22	0	4	0	0	–	–	–
Career		3	3	11	8	3	0.0	0	2	22	22	0	4	0	0	0	0	0

=== College ===
College statistics
Year	Team	G	Tackles						Interceptions					Receiving		
Year	Team	G	Cmb	Solo	Ast	TFL	Sck	FF	Int	Yds	TD	PD	Rec	Yds	Avg	TD
2019	Michigan	13	1	–	1	–	–	–	–	–	–	–	8	145	18.1	1
2020	Michigan	6	–	–	–	–	–	–	–	–	–	–	7	82	11.7	2
2021	Michigan	14	5	–	5	–	–	–	–	–	–	–	23	319	14.2	2
2022	Michigan	14	58	38	20	7	2	–	1	8	–	7	–	–	–	–
2023	Michigan	15	44	26	18	4	1	2	6	232	2	6	–	–	–	–
Career		62	108	70	38	11	3	2	7	240	2	13	38	546	14.4	5

== Personal life ==
Sainristil's first child, a daughter, was born in 2024.
