= College Football Playoff National Championship =

NCAA Division I FBS bowl game

- Stadium: Various NCAA stadiums
- Operated: 2014–present
- Preceded by: Various contemporary and retroactive selectors (1869–1935); National polls (1936–1991); Bowl Coalition (1992–1994); Bowl Alliance (1995–1997); BCS National Championship Game (1998–2013)

2024 season matchup
- Ohio State vs. Notre Dame (Ohio State 34–23)

2025 season matchup
- Miami (FL) vs. Indiana (Indiana 27–21)

The College Football Playoff National Championship is a postseason college football bowl game, used to determine a national champion of the NCAA Division I Football Bowl Subdivision (FBS), which began play in the 2014 college football season. The game is held on a Monday in January and serves as the final game of the College Football Playoff (CFP), a bracket tournament between the top five ranked conference champions, and the top 7 ranked at-large teams in the country that are selected by a playoff committee, which was established as a successor to the Bowl Championship Series (BCS) and the BCS National Championship Game.

The participating teams in the College Football Playoff National Championship are determined by two semifinal games, hosted by an annual rotation of bowls commonly known as the New Year's Six. Thus, the teams to compete in the final are not directly selected by a selection committee, as had been the format used for the BCS National Championship Game.

The game is played at a neutral site, determined through bids by prospective host cities (similar to the NCAA Final Four). When announcing it was soliciting bids for the 2016 and 2017 title games, playoff organizers noted that the bids must propose host stadiums with a capacity of at least 65,000 spectators, and cities cannot host both a semifinal game and the title game in the same year.

The winner of the game is awarded the College Football Playoff National Championship Trophy, which is sponsored by Dr Pepper. It was created as a new championship trophy, rather than the "crystal football" that has been given by the American Football Coaches Association (AFCA) since 1986, as officials wanted a new trophy that was unconnected with the previous BCS championship system.

The inaugural game was held at AT&T Stadium in Arlington, Texas, on January 12, 2015, and was won by Ohio State. A top-ranked team did not win the College Football Playoff National Championship until LSU won the sixth edition of the game, in January 2020. Alabama has the most appearances in a College Football Playoff National Championship, with six, and also the most wins, with three.

The College Football Playoff National Championship is not awarded by the National Collegiate Athletic Association (NCAA). The highest level of college football that the NCAA awards a championship in is the Division I Football Championship Subdivision (FCS).

== Venues ==
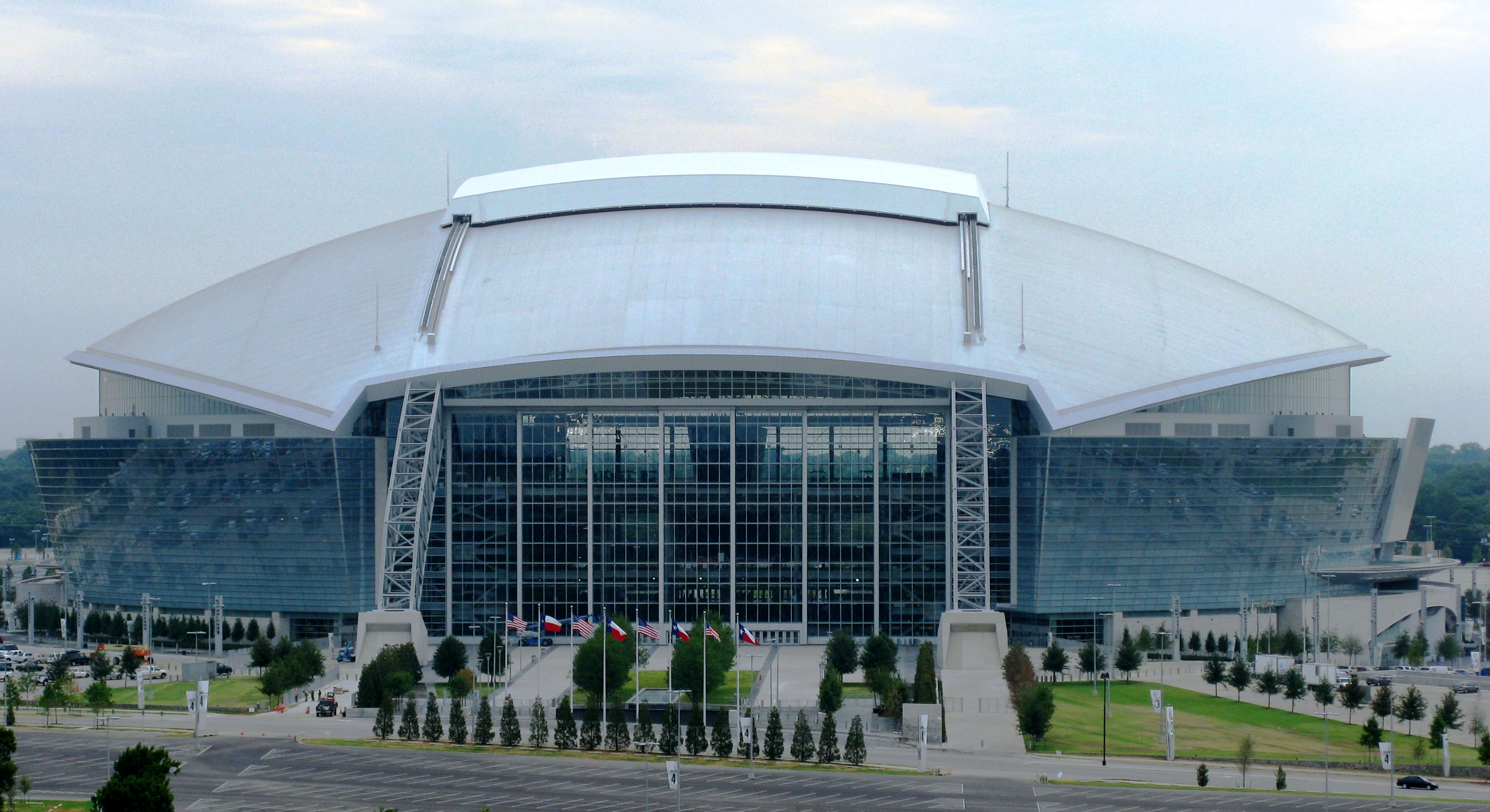
AT&T Stadium in Arlington, Texas, hosted the first College Football Playoff National Championship game, January 2015.

Cities across the United States can bid on the National Championship Game each year. The number of cities capable of bidding for the event is restricted by a requirement to have a stadium with at least 65,000 seats. The stadium restriction would limit the bidding to most cities with a National Football League franchise, since all but four of the stadiums in the league meet the capacity requirements, and in practice all National Championship venues chosen for up to and including the 2026 game are also home to at least one NFL franchise. Unlike the Super Bowl, there is no de jure restriction on climate, although in practice the game has never been awarded to a cold-weather open-air stadium. A venue cannot host a semifinal game and the National Championship Game in the same season.

=== Host cities/regions ===
National Championship Game host cities/regions

The first 10 championship games were each held in a different venue. The 2025 game was the first to be contested in a venue that had previously hosted a CFP title game.

| Location | Stadium | Games | Years hosted |
|---|---|---|---|
| Atlanta | Mercedes-Benz Stadium | 2 | 2018, 2025 |
| Miami metropolitan area | Hard Rock Stadium | 2† | 2021, 2026, 2030 |
| New Orleans | Caesars Superdome | 1† | 2020, 2028 |
| Tampa | Raymond James Stadium | 1† | 2017, 2029 |
| Houston | NRG Stadium | 1 | 2024 |
| Greater Los Angeles | SoFi Stadium | 1 | 2023 |
| Indianapolis | Lucas Oil Stadium | 1 | 2022 |
| San Francisco Bay Area | Levi's Stadium | 1 | 2019 |
| Phoenix metropolitan area | State Farm Stadium | 1 | 2016 |
| Dallas–Fort Worth metroplex | AT&T Stadium | 1 | 2015 |
| Las Vegas Valley | Allegiant Stadium | 0† | 2027 |

† Scheduled for the year(s) noted in italics

Note: Years listed are the calendar year in which the game was played (or will be played) rather than NCAA season.

== Game results ==
Rankings are from the CFP Poll released prior to matchup.

| Season | Playoff | Date | Winning team | | Losing team | | Venue | City | Attendance |
|---|---|---|---|---|---|---|---|---|---|
| 2014 | 2014–15 | Jan 12, 2015 | 4 Ohio State | 42 | 2 Oregon | 20 | AT&T Stadium | Arlington, Texas | 85,788 |
| 2015 | 2015–16 | Jan 11, 2016 | 2 Alabama | 45 | 1 Clemson | 40 | University of Phoenix Stadium | Glendale, Arizona | 75,765 |
| 2016 | 2016–17 | Jan 9, 2017 | 2 Clemson | 35 | 1 Alabama | 31 | Raymond James Stadium | Tampa, Florida | 74,512 |
| 2017 | 2017–18 | Jan 8, 2018 | 4 Alabama | 26^{OT} | 3 Georgia | 23 | Mercedes-Benz Stadium | Atlanta, Georgia | 77,430 |
| 2018 | 2018–19 | Jan 7, 2019 | 2 Clemson | 44 | 1 Alabama | 16 | Levi's Stadium | Santa Clara, California | 74,814 |
| 2019 | 2019–20 | Jan 13, 2020 | 1 LSU | 42 | 3 Clemson | 25 | Mercedes-Benz Superdome | New Orleans, Louisiana | 76,885 |
| 2020 | 2020–21 | Jan 11, 2021 | 1 Alabama | 52 | 3 Ohio State | 24 | Hard Rock Stadium | Miami Gardens, Florida | 14,926‡ |
| 2021 | 2021–22 | Jan 10, 2022 | 3 Georgia | 33 | 1 Alabama | 18 | Lucas Oil Stadium | Indianapolis, Indiana | 68,311 |
| 2022 | 2022–23 | Jan 9, 2023 | 1 Georgia | 65 | 3 TCU | 7 | SoFi Stadium | Inglewood, California | 72,628 |
| 2023 | 2023–24 | Jan 8, 2024 | 1 Michigan | 34 | 2 Washington | 13 | NRG Stadium | Houston, Texas | 72,808 |
| 2024 | 2024–25 | Jan 20, 2025 | 8 Ohio State | 34 | 7 Notre Dame | 23 | Mercedes-Benz Stadium | Atlanta, Georgia | 77,660 |
| 2025 | 2025–26 | Jan 19, 2026 | 1 Indiana | 27 | 10 Miami (FL) | 21 | Hard Rock Stadium | Miami Gardens, Florida | 67,227 |
| 2026 | 2026–27 | Jan 25, 2027 | | | | | Allegiant Stadium | Paradise, Nevada | |
| 2027 | 2027–28 | Jan 24, 2028 | | | | | Caesars Superdome | New Orleans, Louisiana | |
| 2028 | 2028–29 | Jan 22, 2029 | | | | | Raymond James Stadium | Tampa, Florida | |
| 2029 | 2029–30 | Jan 21, 2030 | | | | | Hard Rock Stadium | Miami Gardens, Florida | |

‡ Attendance at the January 2021 game was limited due to the COVID-19 pandemic in the United States.

== Appearances by team ==
Updated through the January 2026 edition (12 games, 24 total appearances).

| Team | Apps. | W | L | % | Season(s) |
|---|---|---|---|---|---|
| Alabama | 6 | 3 | 3 | .500 | 2015, 2016, 2017, 2018, 2020, 2021 |
| Clemson | 4 | 2 | 2 | .500 | 2015, 2016, 2018, 2019 |
| Ohio State | 3 | 2 | 1 | .667 | 2014, 2020, 2024 |
| Georgia | 3 | 2 | 1 | .667 | 2017, 2021, 2022 |
| LSU | 1 | 1 | 0 | 1.000 | 2019 |
| Michigan | 1 | 1 | 0 | 1.000 | 2023 |
| Indiana | 1 | 1 | 0 | 1.000 | 2025 |
| Oregon | 1 | 0 | 1 | .000 | 2014 |
| TCU | 1 | 0 | 1 | .000 | 2022 |
| Washington | 1 | 0 | 1 | .000 | 2023 |
| Notre Dame | 1 | 0 | 1 | .000 | 2024 |
| Miami (FL) | 1 | 0 | 1 | .000 | 2025 |

== Appearances by conference ==
Updated through the January 2026 edition (12 games, 24 total appearances).

| Conference | Appearances | Wins | Losses | Win Pct | # Teams | Team(s) | Title seasons |
|---|---|---|---|---|---|---|---|
| SEC | 10 | 6 | 4 | .600 | 3 | Alabama (3–3); Georgia (2–1); LSU (1–0) | 2015, 2017, 2019, 2020, 2021, 2022 |
| Big Ten | 5 | 4 | 1 | .800 | 3 | Ohio State (2–1); Michigan (1–0); Indiana (1–0) | 2014, 2023, 2024, 2025 |
| ACC | 5 | 2 | 3 | .400 | 2 | Clemson (2–2); Miami (0–1) | 2016, 2018 |
| Pac-12 | 2 | 0 | 2 | .000 | 2 | Oregon (0–1); Washington (0–1) | |
| Big 12 | 1 | 0 | 1 | .000 | 1 | TCU (0–1) | |
| Independent | 1 | 0 | 1 | .000 | 1 | Notre Dame (0–1) | |

Note: The 2017 and 2021 championship games featured SEC teams Alabama and Georgia. The SEC has a record of 4–2 (.667) in championship games against other conferences.

== Coaches ==
The following coaches led their teams to the National Championship. Nick Saban has reached the final the most times, six, with a 3–3 record.

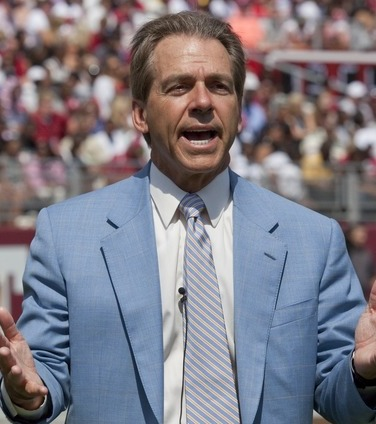
Nick Saban

| Season | Game date | Winning coach | | Losing coach | |
| Season | Game date | Coach | Team | Coach | Team |
|---|---|---|---|---|---|
| 2014 | January 12, 2015 | Urban Meyer | Ohio State | Mark Helfrich | Oregon |
| 2015 | January 11, 2016 | Nick Saban | Alabama | Dabo Swinney | Clemson |
| 2016 | January 9, 2017 | Dabo Swinney | Clemson | Nick Saban | Alabama |
| 2017 | January 8, 2018 | Nick Saban | Alabama | Kirby Smart | Georgia |
| 2018 | January 7, 2019 | Dabo Swinney | Clemson | Nick Saban | Alabama |
| 2019 | January 13, 2020 | Ed Orgeron | LSU | Dabo Swinney | Clemson |
| 2020 | January 11, 2021 | Nick Saban | Alabama | Ryan Day | Ohio State |
| 2021 | January 10, 2022 | Kirby Smart | Georgia | Nick Saban | Alabama |
| 2022 | January 9, 2023 | Kirby Smart | Georgia | Sonny Dykes | TCU |
| 2023 | January 8, 2024 | Jim Harbaugh | Michigan | Kalen DeBoer | Washington |
| 2024 | January 20, 2025 | Ryan Day | Ohio State | Marcus Freeman | Notre Dame |
| 2025 | January 19, 2026 | Curt Cignetti | Indiana | Mario Cristobal | Miami |

=== Appearances by coach ===
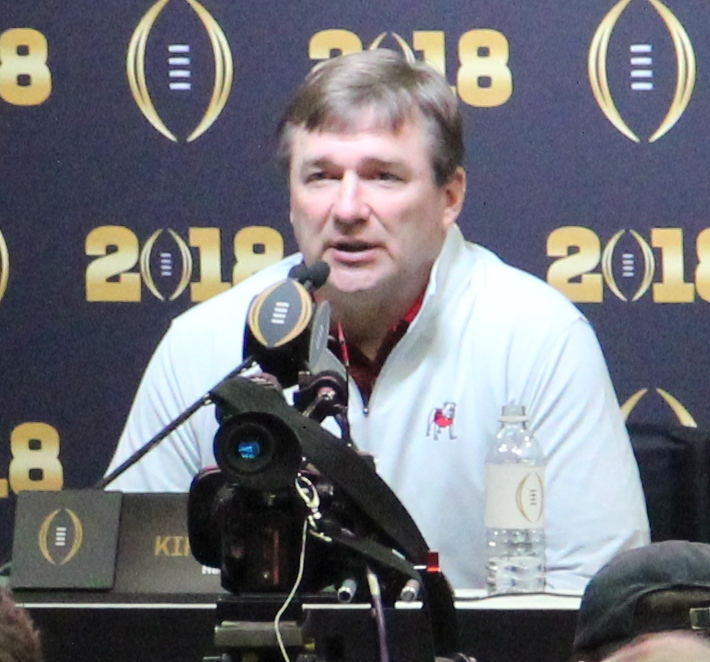
Kirby Smart

| Coach | Team | Games | W | L |
|---|---|---|---|---|
| Nick Saban | Alabama | 6 | 3 | 3 |
| Dabo Swinney | Clemson | 4 | 2 | 2 |
| Kirby Smart | Georgia | 3 | 2 | 1 |
| Ryan Day | Ohio State | 2 | 1 | 1 |
| Urban Meyer | Ohio State | 1 | 1 | 0 |
| Ed Orgeron | LSU | 1 | 1 | 0 |
| Jim Harbaugh | Michigan | 1 | 1 | 0 |
| Curt Cignetti | Indiana | 1 | 1 | 0 |
| Mark Helfrich | Oregon | 1 | 0 | 1 |
| Sonny Dykes | TCU | 1 | 0 | 1 |
| Kalen DeBoer | Washington | 1 | 0 | 1 |
| Marcus Freeman | Notre Dame | 1 | 0 | 1 |
| Mario Cristobal | Miami | 1 | 0 | 1 |

== Players of the Game ==
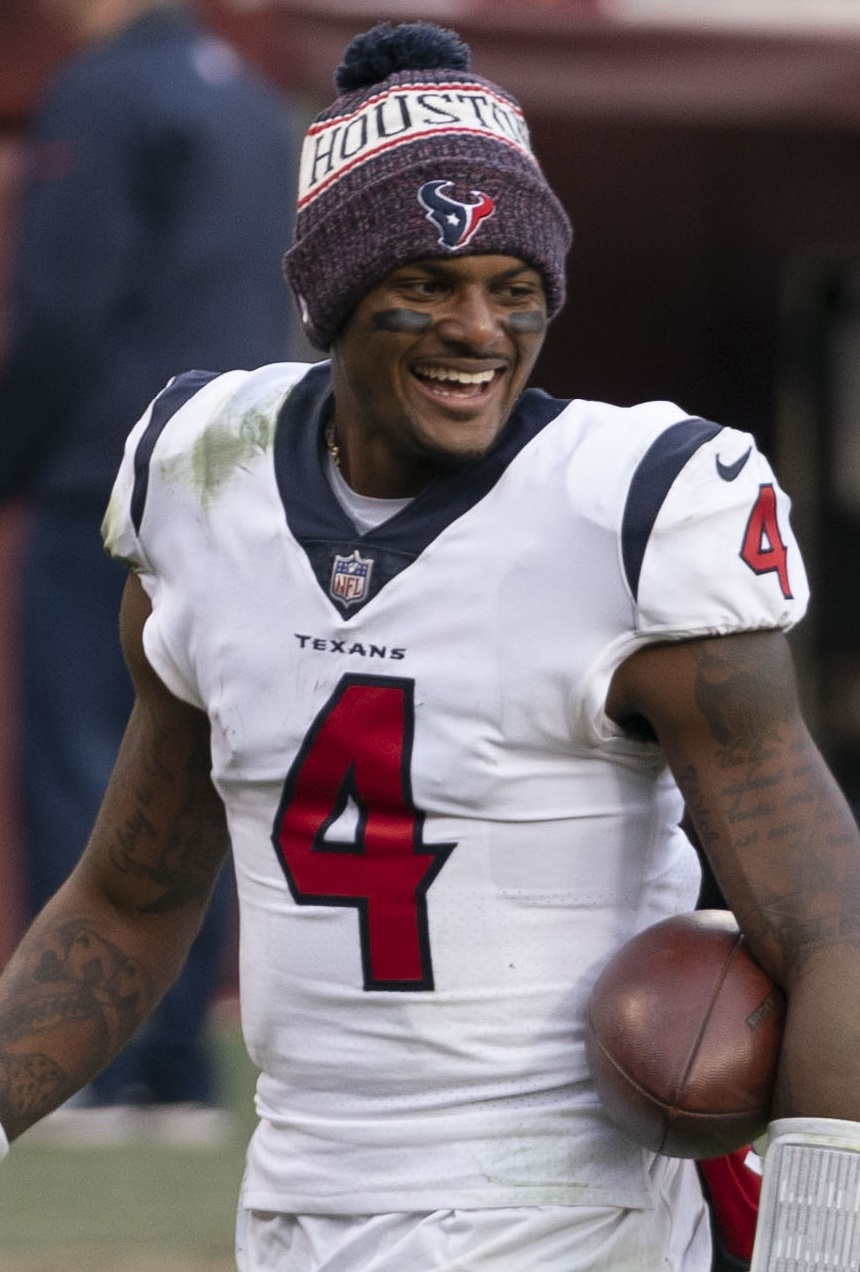
Deshaun Watson was offensive MVP of the January 2017 game.

Offensive and defensive Player of the Game awards are named for each final.

| Game | Date | Offensive Player of the Game | | | Defensive Player of the Game | | | Ref. |
| Game | Date | Player | Team | Pos | Player | Team | Pos | Ref. |
|---|---|---|---|---|---|---|---|---|
| 2015 | January 12, 2015 | Ezekiel Elliott | Ohio State | RB | Tyvis Powell | Ohio State | S | |
| 2016 | January 11, 2016 | O. J. Howard | Alabama | TE | Eddie Jackson | Alabama | S | |
| 2017 | January 9, 2017 | Deshaun Watson | Clemson | QB | Ben Boulware | Clemson | LB | |
| 2018 | January 8, 2018 | Tua Tagovailoa | Alabama | QB | Daron Payne | Alabama | DT | |
| 2019 | January 7, 2019 | Trevor Lawrence | Clemson | QB | Trayvon Mullen | Clemson | CB | |
| 2020 | January 13, 2020 | Joe Burrow | LSU | QB | Patrick Queen | LSU | LB | |
| 2021 | January 11, 2021 | DeVonta Smith | Alabama | WR | Christian Barmore | Alabama | DT | |
| 2022 | January 10, 2022 | Stetson Bennett | Georgia | QB | Lewis Cine | Georgia | DB | |
| 2023 | January 9, 2023 | Stetson Bennett | Georgia | QB | Javon Bullard | Georgia | DB | |
| 2024 | January 8, 2024 | Blake Corum | Michigan | RB | Will Johnson | Michigan | CB | |
| 2025 | January 20, 2025 | Will Howard | Ohio State | QB | Cody Simon | Ohio State | LB | |
| 2026 | January 19, 2026 | Fernando Mendoza | Indiana | QB | Mikail Kamara | Indiana | DE | |

== Game records ==
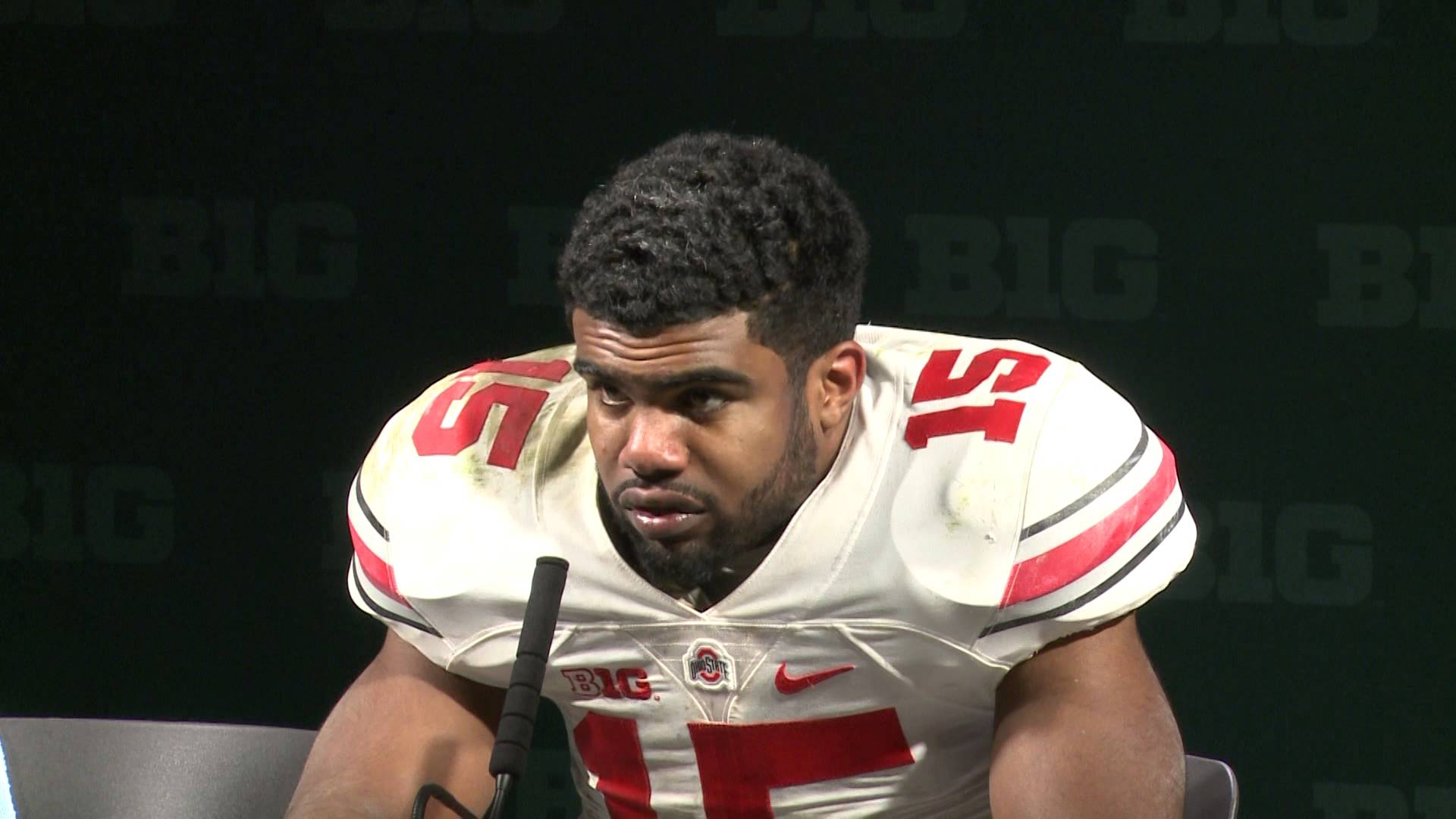
Ezekiel Elliott rushed for 246 yards in the 2015 game.

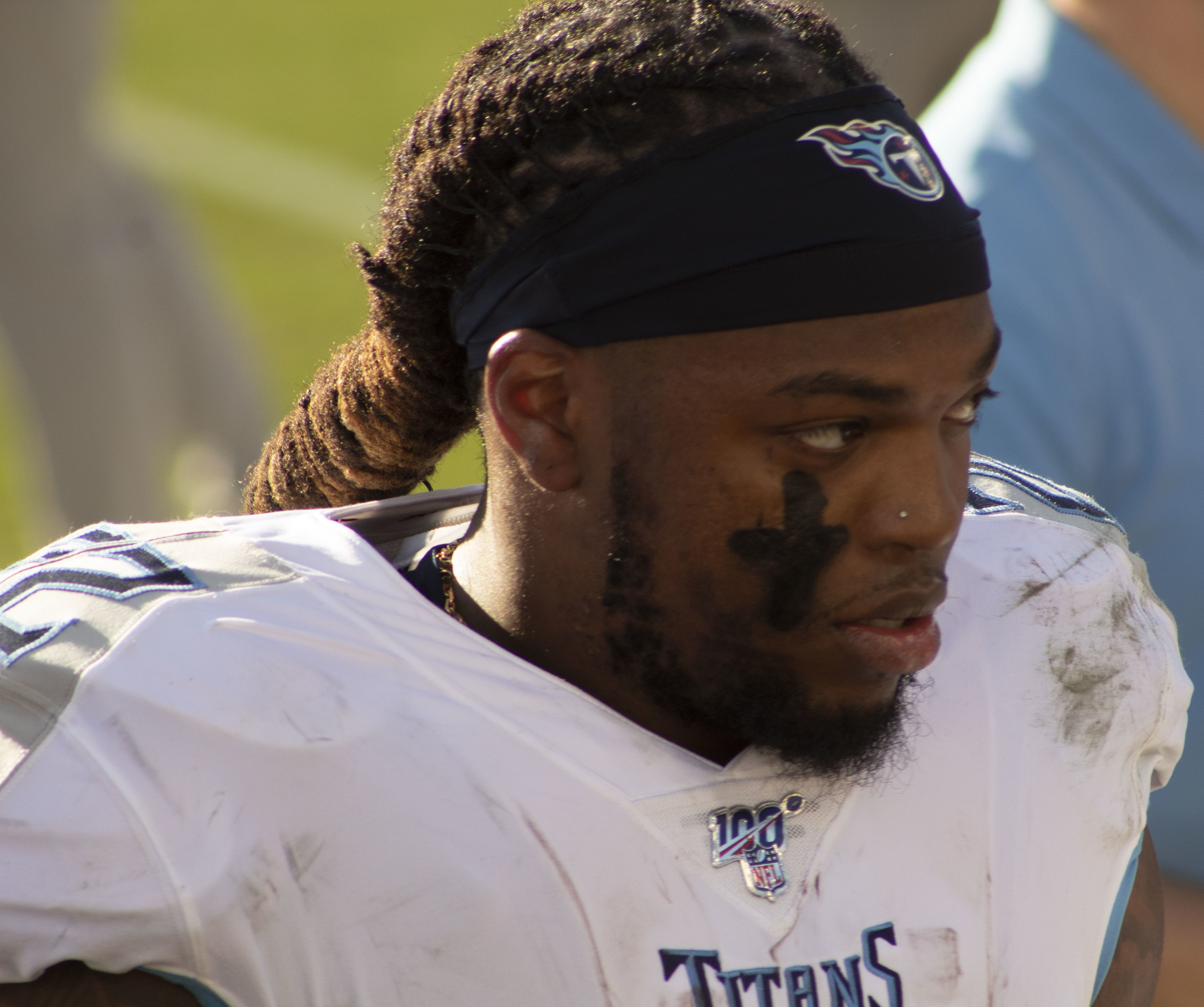
Derrick Henry had a 50-yard touchdown rush in the 2016 game

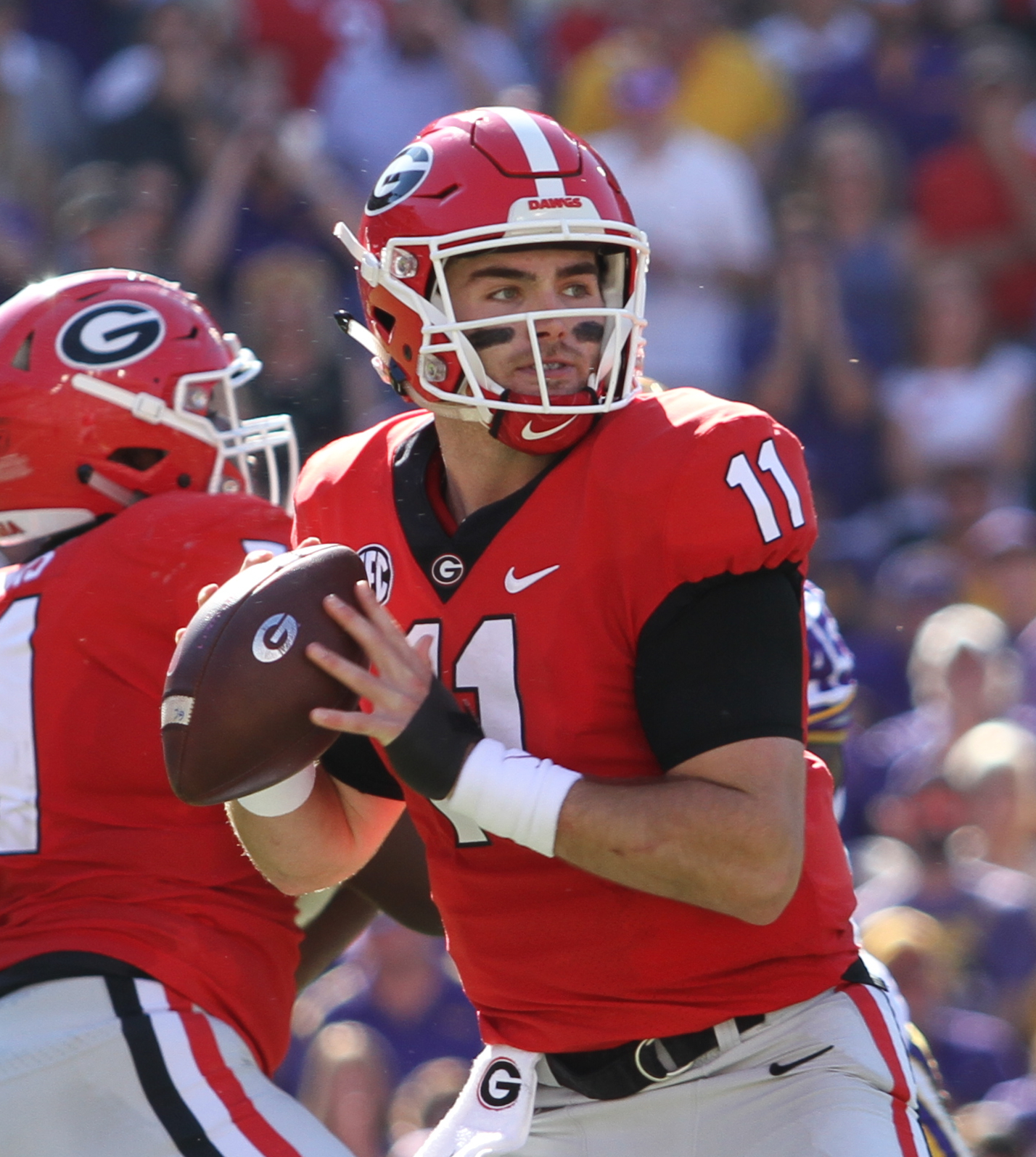
Jake Fromm threw an 80-yard touchdown pass in the 2018 game.

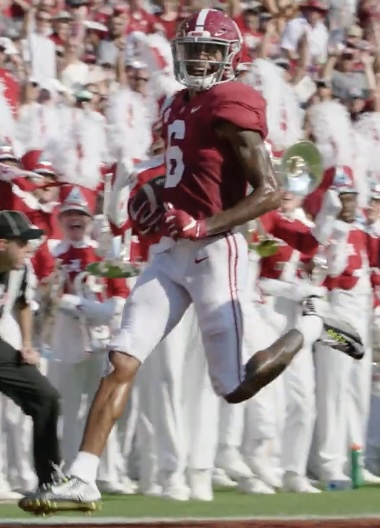
DeVonta Smith had three touchdown receptions in the 2021 game.

| Team records | Record | Head coach | Team | Opponent | Game |
|---|---|---|---|---|---|
| Most points (winning team) | 65 | Kirby Smart | Georgia | TCU | 2023 |
| Most points (losing team) | 40 | Dabo Swinney | Clemson | Alabama | 2016 |
| Most points (both teams) | 85 | Nick Saban | Alabama | Clemson | 2016 |
| Most points (both teams) | 85 | Dabo Swinney | Clemson | Alabama | 2016 |
| Fewest points (both teams) | 47 | Jim Harbaugh | Michigan | Washington | 2024 |
| Fewest points (both teams) | 47 | Kalen DeBoer | Washington | Michigan | 2024 |
| Fewest points allowed | 7 | Kirby Smart | Georgia | TCU | 2023 |
| Largest margin of victory | 58 | Kirby Smart | Georgia | TCU | 2023 |
| Smallest margin of victory | 3 | Nick Saban | Alabama | Georgia | 2018 |
| Largest comeback | 14 | Dabo Swinney | Clemson | Alabama | 2017 |
| Rushing yards | 303 | Jim Harbaugh | Michigan | Washington | 2024 |
| Passing yards | 464 | Nick Saban | Alabama | Ohio State | 2021 |
| Total yards | 628 | Ed Orgeron | LSU | Clemson | 2020 |
| First downs | 33 | Nick Saban | Alabama | Ohio State | 2021 |
| Fewest rushing yards allowed | 30 | Kirby Smart | Georgia | Alabama | 2022 |
| Fewest passing yards allowed | 152 | Kirby Smart | Georgia | TCU | 2023 |
| Fewest total yards allowed | 188 | Kirby Smart | Georgia | TCU | 2023 |
| Total plays | 99 | Dabo Swinney | Clemson | Alabama | 2017 |
| Individual records | Record | Player | Team | Opponent | Game |
| Total offense | 521 | Joe Burrow | LSU | Clemson | 2020 |
| Rushing yards | 246 | Ezekiel Elliott | Ohio State | Oregon | 2015 |
| Rushing TDs | 4 | Ezekiel Elliott | Ohio State | Oregon | 2015 |
| Passing yards | 464 | Mac Jones | Alabama | Ohio State | 2021 |
| Passing TDs | 5 | Joe Burrow | LSU | Clemson | 2020 |
| Passing TDs | 5 | Mac Jones | Alabama | Ohio State | 2021 |
| Receptions | 12 | DeVonta Smith | Alabama | Ohio State | 2021 |
| Receiving yards | 221 | Ja'Marr Chase | LSU | Clemson | 2020 |
| Receiving TDs | 3 | DeVonta Smith | Alabama | Ohio State | 2021 |
| TDs responsible for (Note: "Touchdowns responsible for" is the NCAA's official term for combined passing and rushing touchdowns.) | 6 | Joe Burrow | LSU | Clemson | 2020 |
| TDs responsible for | 6 | Stetson Bennett | Georgia | TCU | 2023 |
| Field goals | 4 | Will Reichard | Alabama | Georgia | 2022 |
| Tackles (total) | 14 | Tuf Borland | Ohio State | Alabama | 2021 |
| Sacks | 3.0 | Kevin Dodd | Clemson | Alabama | 2016 |
| Interceptions | 2 | Javon Bullard | Georgia | TCU | 2023 |
| Punts | 10 | J. K. Scott | Alabama | Clemson | 2017 |
| Long plays | Record | Player | Team | Opponent | Game |
| Touchdown rush | 50 | Derrick Henry | Alabama | Clemson | 2016 |
| Rush | 70 | Quinshon Judkins | Ohio State | Notre Dame | 2025 |
| Touchdown pass | 80 | Jake Fromm | Georgia | Alabama | 2018 |
| Pass | 80 | Jake Fromm | Georgia | Alabama | 2018 |
| Touchdown reception | 80 | Mecole Hardman | Georgia | Alabama | 2018 |
| Reception | 80 | Mecole Hardman | Georgia | Alabama | 2018 |
| Kickoff return | 95 | Kenyan Drake | Alabama | Clemson | 2016 |
| Punt return | 19 | Mecole Hardman | Georgia | Alabama | 2018 |
| Punt return | 19 | DeVonta Smith | Alabama | Ohio State | 2021 |
| Interception return | 81 | Mike Sainristil | Michigan | Washington | 2024 |
| Punt | 58 | Will Spiers | Clemson | LSU | 2020 |
| Field goal | 52 | B.T. Potter | Clemson | LSU | 2020 |

== National anthem performers ==
The national anthem usually begins with a drum roll by two snare drummers, with one member representing each team.

- 2015: Lady Antebellum
- 2016: Ciara
- 2017: Little Big Town
- 2018: Zac Brown Band
- 2019: Andy Grammer
- 2020: Lauren Daigle
- 2022: Natalie Grant
- 2023: Pentatonix
- 2024: Fantasia
- 2025: Coco Jones (accompanied by Adam Blackstone)
- 2026: Jamal Roberts

The national anthem for the 2021 game was pre-recorded due to COVID concerns.

== Broadcasters ==
=== Television ===
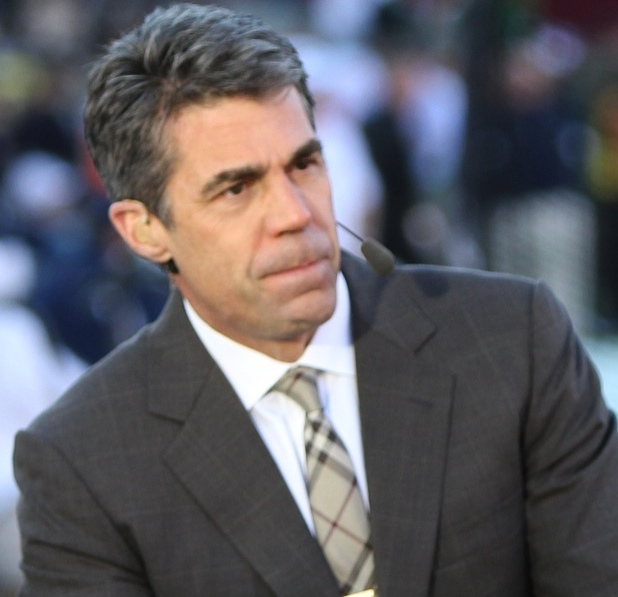
Chris Fowler has called every National Championship final.

| Date | Network | Play-by-play | Color commentator(s) | Sideline reporter(s) |
|---|---|---|---|---|
| January 12, 2015 | ESPN | Chris Fowler | Kirk Herbstreit | Heather Cox and Tom Rinaldi |
| January 11, 2016 | ESPN | Chris Fowler | Kirk Herbstreit | Heather Cox and Tom Rinaldi |
| January 9, 2017 | ESPN | Chris Fowler | Kirk Herbstreit | Samantha Ponder and Tom Rinaldi |
| January 8, 2018 | ESPN | Chris Fowler | Kirk Herbstreit | Maria Taylor and Tom Rinaldi |
| January 7, 2019 | ESPN | Chris Fowler | Kirk Herbstreit | Maria Taylor and Tom Rinaldi |
| January 13, 2020 | ESPN | Chris Fowler | Kirk Herbstreit | Maria Taylor and Tom Rinaldi |
| January 11, 2021 | ESPN | Chris Fowler | Kirk Herbstreit | Maria Taylor and Allison Williams |
| January 10, 2022 | ESPN | Chris Fowler | Kirk Herbstreit | Holly Rowe and Molly McGrath |
| January 9, 2023 | ESPN | Chris Fowler | Kirk Herbstreit | Holly Rowe and Molly McGrath |
| January 8, 2024 | ESPN | Chris Fowler | Kirk Herbstreit | Holly Rowe and Molly McGrath |
| January 20, 2025 | ESPN | Chris Fowler | Kirk Herbstreit | Holly Rowe and Molly McGrath |
| January 19, 2026 | ESPN | Chris Fowler | Kirk Herbstreit | Holly Rowe and Molly McGrath |

Beginning with the 2027 championship, ABC will simulcast the national championship with ESPN.

=== Radio ===
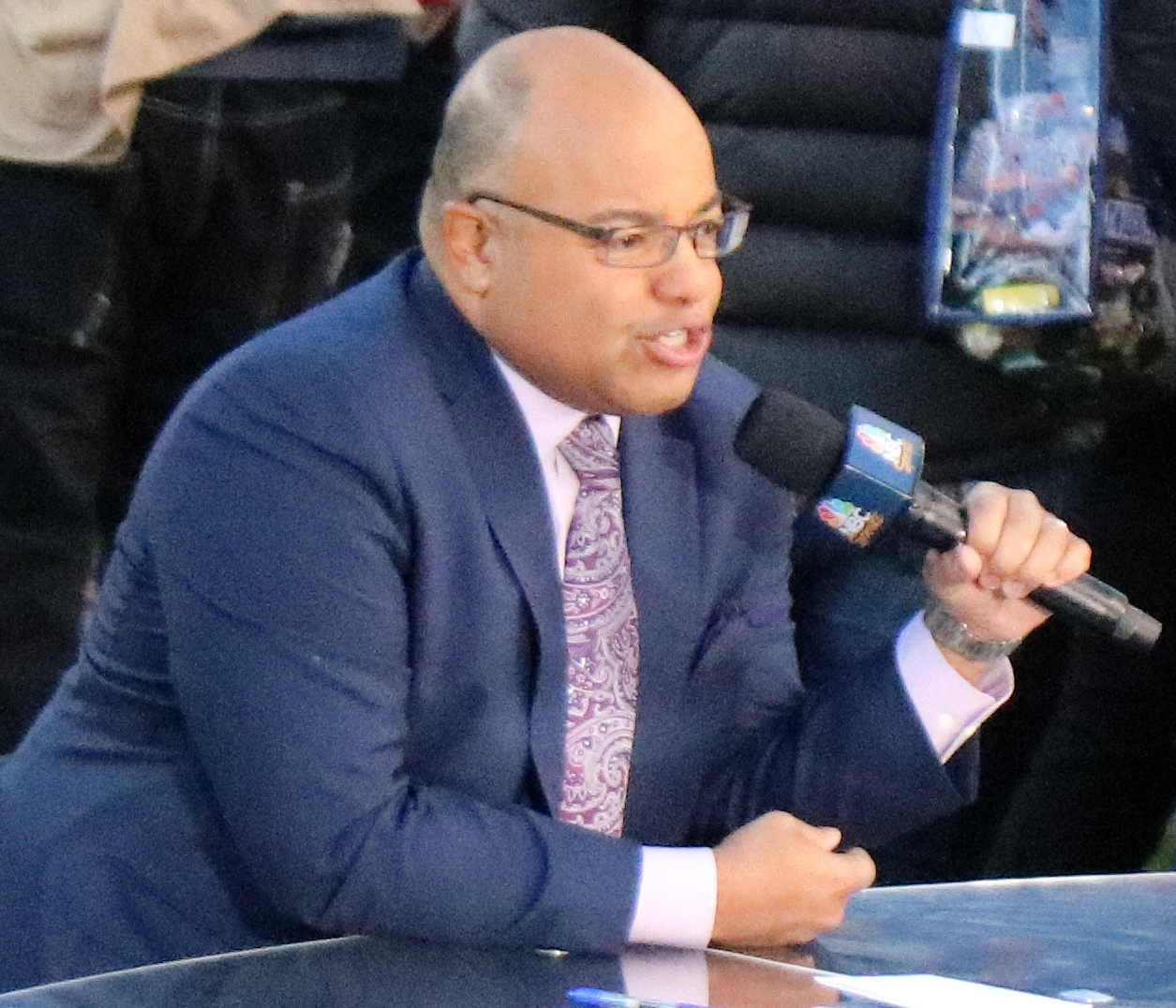
Mike Tirico called the first two National Championship finals before moving to NBC after the 2016 game.

| Date | Network | Play-by-play | Color commentator(s) | Sideline reporter(s) |
|---|---|---|---|---|
| January 12, 2015 | ESPN Radio | Mike Tirico | Todd Blackledge | Holly Rowe and Joe Schad |
| January 11, 2016 | ESPN Radio | Mike Tirico | Todd Blackledge | Holly Rowe and Joe Schad |
| January 9, 2017 | ESPN Radio | Sean McDonough | Todd Blackledge | Holly Rowe and Ian Fitzsimmons |
| January 8, 2018 | ESPN Radio | Sean McDonough | Todd Blackledge | Holly Rowe and Ian Fitzsimmons |
| January 7, 2019 | ESPN Radio | Sean McDonough | Todd Blackledge | Holly Rowe and Ian Fitzsimmons |
| January 13, 2020 | ESPN Radio | Sean McDonough | Todd Blackledge | Holly Rowe and Ian Fitzsimmons |
| January 11, 2021 | ESPN Radio | Sean McDonough | Greg McElroy | |
| January 10, 2022 | ESPN Radio | Sean McDonough | Todd Blackledge | Ian Fitzsimmons and Kris Budden |
| January 9, 2023 | ESPN Radio | Sean McDonough | Todd Blackledge | Ian Fitzsimmons and Kris Budden |
| January 8, 2024 | ESPN Radio | Sean McDonough | Greg McElroy | Ian Fitzsimmons and Kris Budden |
| January 20, 2025 | ESPN Radio | Sean McDonough | Greg McElroy | Ian Fitzsimmons and Katie George |
| January 19, 2026 | ESPN Radio | Sean McDonough | Greg McElroy | Ian Fitzsimmons and Quint Kessenich |

=== Local radio ===
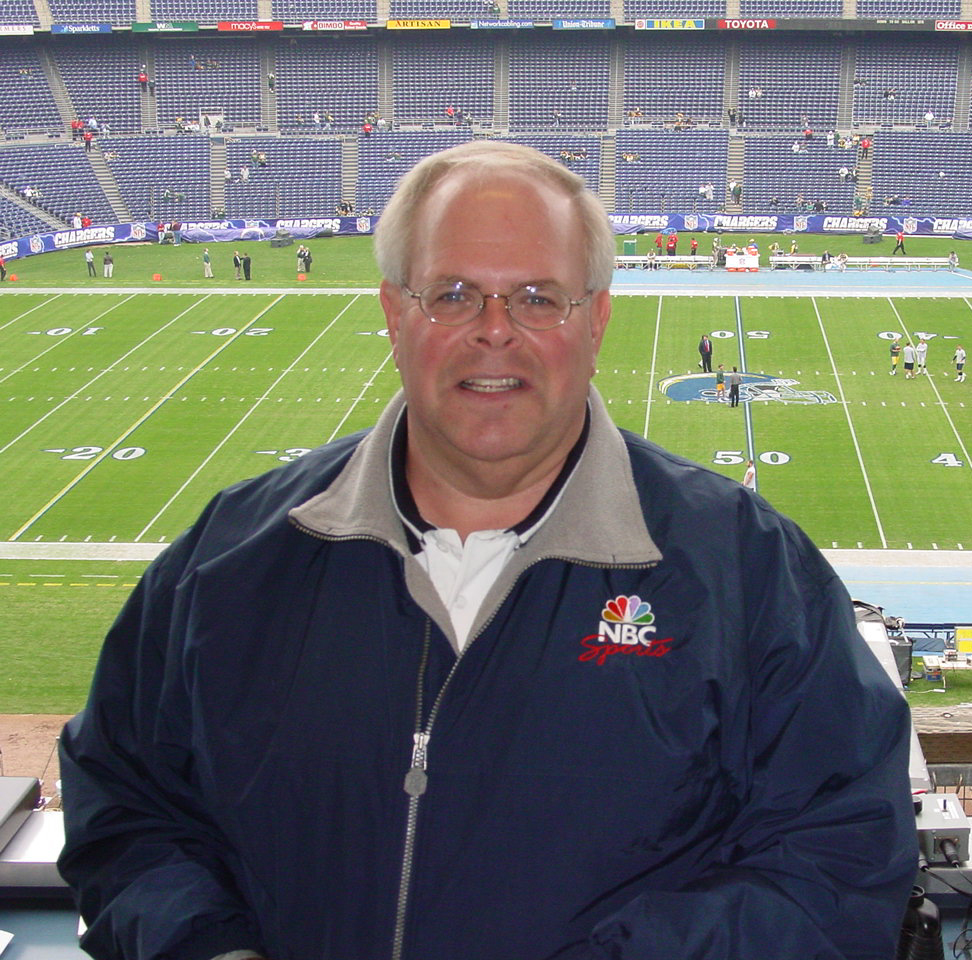
Eli Gold has called every National Championship final Alabama has been in.

| Date | Flagship station | Play-by-play | Color commentator(s) | Sideline reporter(s) |
|---|---|---|---|---|
| January 12, 2015 | KUGN (Oregon); WBNS-AM/FM (Ohio State) | Jerry Allen; Paul Keels | Mike Jorgensen; Jim Lachey | Marty Bannister |
| January 11, 2016 | WFFN/WTSK (Alabama); WCCP-FM (Clemson) | Eli Gold; Don Munson | Phil Savage; Rodney Williams | Chris Stewart; Michael Palmer |
| January 9, 2017 | WCCP-FM (Clemson); WFFN/WTSK (Alabama) | Don Munson; Eli Gold | Rodney Williams; Phil Savage | Michael Palmer; Chris Stewart |
| January 8, 2018 | WFFN/WTSK (Alabama); WSB (Georgia) | Eli Gold; Scott Howard | Phil Savage; Eric Zeier | Chris Stewart; Chuck Dowdle |
| January 7, 2019 | WCCP-FM (Clemson); WFFN/WTSK (Alabama) | Don Munson; Eli Gold | Rodney Williams; John Parker Wilson | Reggie Merriweather; Rashad Johnson |
| January 13, 2020 | WCCP-FM (Clemson); WDGL (LSU) | Don Munson; Chris Blair | Tim Bourret and Brad Scott; Doug Moreau | Reggie Merriweather; Gordy Rush |
| January 11, 2021 | WBNS-AM/FM (Ohio State); WFFN/WTSK (Alabama) | Paul Keels; Eli Gold | Jim Lachey; John Parker Wilson | Matt Andrews; Rashad Johnson |
| January 10, 2022 | WSB (Georgia); WFFN/WTSK (Alabama) | Scott Howard; Eli Gold | Eric Zeier; John Parker Wilson | D. J. Shockley; Rashad Johnson |
| January 9, 2023 | WBAP (TCU); WSB (Georgia) | Brian Estridge; Scott Howard | John Denton; Eric Zeier | Landry Burdine; D. J. Shockley |
| January 8, 2024 | KJR (Washington); WWJ (Michigan) | Tony Castricone; Doug Karsch | Cameron Cleeland; Jon Jansen | Elise Woodward; Jason Avant |
| January 20, 2025 | WBNS-AM/FM (Ohio State); WSBT (Notre Dame) | Paul Keels; Tony Simeone | Jim Lachey; Ryan Harris | Matt Andrews and Skip Mosic |
| January 19, 2026 | WQAM-FM (Miami); WFNI (Indiana) | Joe Zagacki; Don Fischer | Don Bailey; Buck Suhr | Josh Darrow; John Herrick |

== See also ==
- College football national championships in NCAA Division I FBS
- Koshien Bowl (Japanese Collegiate American Football Championship)
- Mythical national championship
