= 2023–24 College Football Playoff =

Postseason college football tournament

- Season: 2023
- Dates: January 1–8, 2024
- Teams invited: (1) Michigan; (2) Washington; (3) Texas; (4) Alabama
- Venues: Caesars Superdome; NRG Stadium; Rose Bowl
- Champions: Michigan (1st CFP title, 12th overall title)

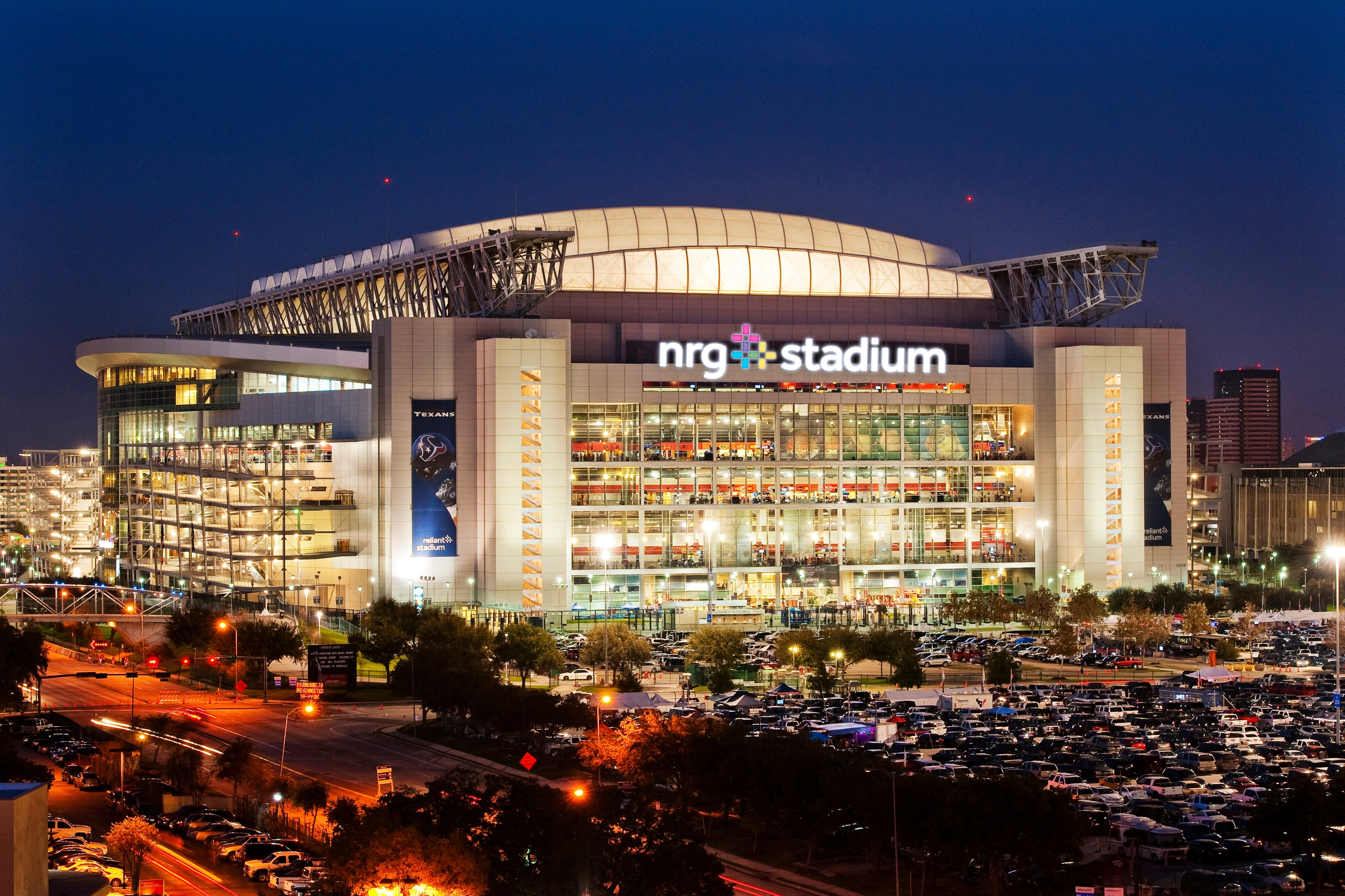
NRG Stadium in Houston, Texas, hosted the College Football Playoff National Championship.

The 2023–24 College Football Playoff was a single-elimination postseason tournament that determined the national champion of the 2023 NCAA Division I FBS football season. It was the tenth edition of the College Football Playoff (CFP) and involved the top four teams in the country as ranked by the College Football Playoff poll playing in two semifinals, with the winners of each advancing to the national championship game. Each participating team was the champion of its respective conference: No. 1 Michigan from the Big Ten Conference, No. 2 Washington from the Pac-12 Conference, No. 3 Texas from the Big 12 Conference, and No. 4 Alabama from the Southeastern Conference. Significant criticism arose from the exclusion of Florida State, the first undefeated Power Five conference champion to be left out of the playoff and only the second such team ever to be not chosen for title contention (2004 Auburn).

The playoff bracket's semifinal games were held at the Rose Bowl and Sugar Bowl on New Year's Day, part of the season's slate of bowl games. In the Rose Bowl semifinal, Michigan defeated Alabama in overtime, 27–20. The second semifinal, at the Sugar Bowl, saw Washington defeat Texas, 37–31. As a result of their victories, Michigan and Washington faced each other in the national championship game, held on January 8 in Houston. In the championship game, Michigan had an effective start to the game on offense and held a seven-point halftime lead, which they were able to expand in the second half. Two touchdowns in the fourth quarter helped them pull away and secure a 34–13 victory for their first national championship since 1997. Their win gave them a 15–0 record to conclude the season, making them the fourth FBS national champions to finish the season with such a record.

This playoff was the last to use the four-team bracket format; the playoff's board of managers announced in December 2022 that the tournament would expand to 12 teams beginning with its 2024–25 edition. Broadcast on ESPN, it was the most viewed playoff since the 2017–18 edition and was shortly followed by a six-year, $7.8 billion extension of the media rights agreement between ESPN and the CFP.

== Bracket ==
Semifinals
January 1 – Rose Bowl Rose Bowl Stadium, Pasadena
1 | Michigan (OT) | 27
4 | Alabama | 20
January 1 – Sugar Bowl Caesars Superdome, New Orleans
2 | Washington | 37
3 | Texas | 31

Championship
January 8 – National Championship NRG Stadium, Houston
1 | Michigan | 34
2 | Washington | 13

== Selection and teams ==
The College Football Playoff (CFP) selection committee for the 2023 season was chaired by NC State athletic director Boo Corrigan and consisted of former Nevada head coach and athletic director Chris Ault, Kentucky athletic director Mitch Barnhart, Navy athletic director Chet Gladchuck, former Wake Forest, Baylor, and Ohio head coach Jim Grobe, Utah athletic director Mark Harlan, Michigan athletic director Warde Manuel, Miami (OH) athletic director David Sayler, former NFL player Will Shields, Kansas State athletic director Gene Taylor, Virginia Union athletic director and former head coach Joe Taylor, Notre Dame trustee and former Sugar Bowl president Rod West, and former college football reporter Kelly Whiteside. Bill Hancock continued in his position as CFP executive director, which he has held since the organization's conception in 2012.

The College Football Playoff poll released its first rankings on October 31, 2023, with the top six teams consisting of Ohio State, Georgia, Michigan, Florida State, Washington, and Oregon. After no change in the top six from week nine to week ten, the next two rankings released saw only two changes at the top of the poll. In the November 14 rankings, Georgia jumped Ohio State to become the new No. 1 team following their victory over No. 9 Ole Miss, and another swap took place the following week when Washington was bumped to No. 4 in place of Florida State after the Huskies' road win against No. 11 Oregon State. Ohio State lost to Michigan to conclude the regular season, dropping them from No. 2 to No. 6 and moving Michigan, Washington, Florida State, and Oregon up one spot each. Each team in the penultimate top six qualified for their respective conference championship game. Michigan defeated Iowa in the Big Ten Championship to mark their third consecutive conference title; the Associated Press said that Iowa "never had a chance" in the game and remarked that Michigan was likely to take the top ranking for the playoff. Similarly, Washington won the Pac-12 Championship with their second win of the year against Oregon; the Huskies won an October 14 game between the teams by three points and claimed the conference title with another three-point win. The SEC Championship matched No. 1 Georgia and No. 8 Alabama and resulted in a three-point Alabama upset victory and Georgia's first loss of the season. Florida State, who lost their starting quarterback Jordan Travis in their next-to-last regular season game against North Alabama, and were also without backup Tate Rodemaker due to a concussion suffered the next game, turned to Brock Glenn for their ACC Championship matchup with No. 14 Louisville. Despite the depleted roster, the Seminoles won 16–6.

The four teams competing in the playoff were determined by the selection committee's final rankings, which were released on December 3, 2023. Michigan and Washington were generally seen as guaranteed bids while the final two spots were debated between Florida State, Texas, and Alabama. Florida State's injury problems, particularly to Travis, were seen as a liability and potentially a reason to exclude them, though many analysts urged for their inclusion based on their undefeated record and conference championship. Alabama and Texas were both one-loss conference champions, though Texas held the head-to-head advantage after defeating the Crimson Tide by ten points in early September. The Longhorns' sole loss had come by four points to No. 12 Oklahoma.

2023 College Football Playoff rankings top six progression
| No. | Week 9 | Week 10 | Week 11 | Week 12 | Week 13 | Final |
|---|---|---|---|---|---|---|
| 1 | Ohio State (8–0) | Ohio State (9–0) | Georgia (10–0) | Georgia (11–0) | Georgia (12–0) | Michigan (13–0) |
| 2 | Georgia (8–0) | Georgia (9–0) | Ohio State (10–0) | Ohio State (11–0) | Michigan (12–0) | Washington (13–0) |
| 3 | Michigan (8–0) | Michigan (9–0) | Michigan (10–0) | Michigan (11–0) | Washington (12–0) | Texas (12–1) |
| 4 | Florida State (8–0) | Florida State (9–0) | Florida State (10–0) | Washington (11–0) | Florida State (12–0) | Alabama (12–1) |
| 5 | Washington (8–0) | Washington (9–0) | Washington (10–0) | Florida State (11–0) | Oregon (11–1) | Florida State (13–0) |
| 6 | Oregon (7–1) | Oregon (8–1) | Oregon (9–1) | Oregon (10–1) | Ohio State (11–1) | Georgia (12–1) |

Key: Team increased ranking from previous week Team decreased ranking from previous week Team selected to College Football Playoff

=== Exclusion of Florida State ===
Ultimately, the committee selected Michigan, Washington, Texas, and Alabama to participate in the playoff, while opting to exclude Florida State. This marked the first time an undefeated Power Five team had been left out of the playoff, a decision that was met with significant criticism from the media. ACC commissioner Jim Phillips also criticized the committee, calling the decision "unfathomable". An antitrust investigation into the CFP was launched by Ashley Moody, the attorney general of Florida, and Governor Ron DeSantis, in the midst of his presidential campaign, proposed setting aside $1 million to help Florida State with legal fees in suing the CFP. In response to a letter from Senator Rick Scott, executive director Bill Hancock cited Travis's injury and a lower strength of schedule as the cause of FSU's exclusion; according to the ESPN Football Power Index, Florida State's strength of schedule ranked No. 55 in the FBS, while Michigan's, the lowest of the four playoff teams, was No. 33. The Seminoles finished with the No. 5 ranking and were matched with No. 6 Georgia in the Orange Bowl. The selections of Alabama and Texas were also of note in that they were ranked No. 8 and No. 7, respectively, in the next-to-last CFP rankings, marking the first time a team ranked lower than No. 6 in the penultimate poll (2017 Georgia and 2019 Oklahoma) qualified for the playoff. This edition marked the CFP debut for the Longhorns, while Alabama made its eighth appearance, Michigan its third, and Washington its second.

== Playoff games ==
=== Semifinals ===
==== Rose Bowl ====
2024 Rose Bowl

| Quarter | 1 | 2 | 3 | 4 | OT | Total |
|---|---|---|---|---|---|---|
| No. 4 Alabama | 7 | 3 | 0 | 10 | 0 | 20 |
| No. 1 Michigan | 7 | 6 | 0 | 7 | 7 | 27 |

at the Rose Bowl • Pasadena, California

- Date: January 1, 2024
- Game time: 2:11 p.m. PST

The playoff began on January 1 with the Rose Bowl matchup between Michigan and Alabama, the sixth all-time meeting between the teams. Each team scored a touchdown in the first quarter: Alabama on a Jase McClellan rush, and Michigan on a J. J. McCarthy pass. The score remained 7–7 until a Michigan touchdown to take the lead late in the second quarter. The Wolverines led by three points at halftime and maintained this lead through to the fourth quarter when Alabama scored a touchdown. An Alabama field goal and Michigan touchdown tied the score at 20, forcing the game to go into overtime. It was the second Rose Bowl and the third CFP game to reach overtime. Michigan received the ball first in overtime and scored a touchdown in two plays, both rushes by Corum, giving them a 27–20 lead, and Alabama failed to do the same, ending the game and giving Michigan a berth to the national championship.

==== Sugar Bowl ====
2024 Sugar Bowl

| Quarter | 1 | 2 | 3 | 4 | Total |
|---|---|---|---|---|---|
| No. 3 Texas | 7 | 14 | 0 | 10 | 31 |
| No. 2 Washington | 7 | 14 | 10 | 6 | 37 |

at Caesars Superdome • New Orleans, Louisiana

- Date: January 1, 2024
- Game time: 8:01 p.m. CST

Washington and Texas met in the Sugar Bowl for the second playoff semifinal; it was their sixth all-time meeting. Washington opened the scoring on their first drive through Dillon Johnson, and Texas tied the game on their next drive. Both teams scored twice more before halftime, making the score 21–21. The Huskies began the second half by scoring thirteen unanswered points while forcing two Texas fumbles. Adonai Mitchell scored a rushing touchdown for Texas before the teams traded field goals in the fourth quarter. The Longhorns reached the Washington 12-yard line in five plays, leaving fifteen seconds on the clock. Their next three plays resulted in no yardage gained, and they failed to score on 4th & Goal with no time remaining, giving Washington a six-point victory and a national championship game berth.

=== Championship ===
2024 College Football Playoff National Championship

| Quarter | 1 | 2 | 3 | 4 | Total |
|---|---|---|---|---|---|
| No. 2 Washington | 3 | 7 | 3 | 0 | 13 |
| No. 1 Michigan | 14 | 3 | 3 | 14 | 34 |

at NRG Stadium • Houston, Texas

- Date: January 8, 2024
- Game time: 6:46 p.m. CST

Michigan and Washington met for the national championship on January 8. Michigan entered as betting favorites by a 4.5-point spread and received the ball to begin the game. Both teams scored on their opening drives, and Michigan scored again on their second drive. A field goal by James Turner shortly into the second quarter extended Michigan's lead to fourteen points. A turnover on downs by each team followed before Washington scored their first touchdown on a 3-yard pass by Michael Penix Jr. Each team scored their first points of the second half on a field goal. Three punts by each team followed, a streak broken by two Michigan touchdowns. These were the last scores of the game; Washington's last offensive possession ended with a turnover on downs on an incomplete pass, securing a national championship for the Wolverines.

== Aftermath ==
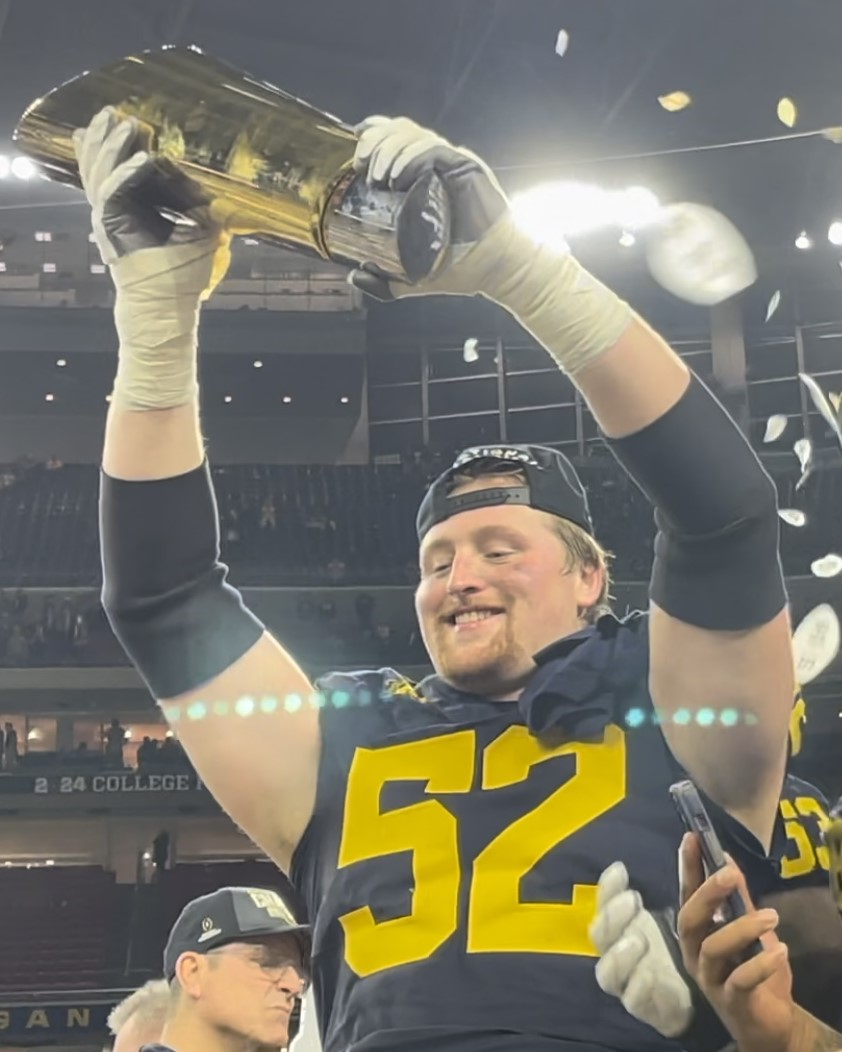
Michigan's Karsen Barnhart with the CFP trophy

Michigan's national championship victory was their first since claiming a share of the 1997 national title, which they split with Nebraska; their last outright national championship came in 1948. They finished the season 15–0, making them the fourth FBS national champions to do so. All three playoff games were broadcast by ESPN; the 2023–24 playoff was the most viewed since the 2017–18 edition, which featured a double-overtime Rose Bowl and an overtime national championship.

In the weeks following the playoff, three of the four coaches of the participating teams left their programs: Alabama's Nick Saban retired on January 10, Washington's Kalen DeBoer was hired to replace Saban on January 12, and Michigan's Jim Harbaugh took an NFL head coaching job with the Los Angeles Chargers on January 24. This left Texas's Steve Sarkisian as the only one of the four to remain with his team for the 2024 season. This was the last playoff to feature a four-team format, as the next year's edition was expanded to feature twelve teams, as announced by the CFP board of managers in December 2022. Additionally, the championship was Washington's last game as a member of the Pac-12 Conference; as a part of a wave of conference realignment, they joined the Big Ten on August 2, 2024. The realignment effectively caused the collapse of the Pac-12, since only Oregon State and Washington State, out of the conference's twelve members in 2023, lack plans to join another conference in 2024.

Reports emerged on February 13, 2024, that ESPN and the CFP had agreed to a six-year extension of their media rights deal worth $7.8 billion, equivalent to $1.3 billion per year. The 2023–24 playoff was part of the parties' original media rights contract, signed in 2012, which had a payout of $470 million per year through 2025; that payout will increase to $608 million for the final two years of the original deal following the signing of the extension.
