= Dominick Sanders =

American football player (born 1995)

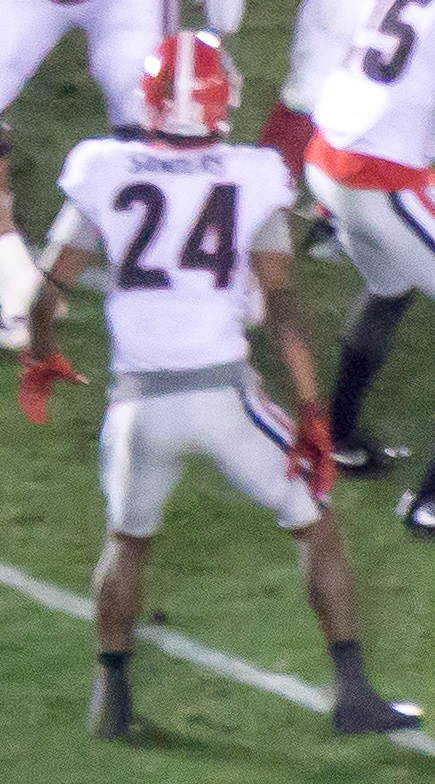
- Sanders in 2018

Profile
- Position: Safety

Personal information
- Born: November 17, 1995 (age 30)
- Listed height: 6 ft 0 in (1.83 m)
- Listed weight: 200 lb (91 kg)

Career information
- High school: Tucker (Tucker, Georgia)
- College: Georgia (2014–2017)
- NFL draft: 2018: undrafted

Career history
- Dallas Cowboys (2018)*; Columbus Lions (2019); Spokane Shock (2021–2022)
- * Offseason or practice squad member only

Awards and highlights
- First-team All-SEC (2015)

Dominick Markel Sanders (born November 17, 1995) is an American former football safety. He played college football for the Georgia Bulldogs.

== Early life ==
Sanders attended Tucker High School in Tucker, Georgia. A three-star recruit, he committed to play college football at the University of Georgia.

== College career ==
Sanders became a starter for the Bulldogs as a true freshman. In the 2014 Belk Bowl against Louisville, he recorded two interceptions in a 37–14 victory. Sanders finished his freshman season totaling 34 tackles, three interceptions, and a fumble recovery touchdown. As a sophomore, he recorded 48 tackles, six interceptions, and a sack, being named to the first-team All-SEC. In his junior season, Sanders tallied 34 tackles and three interceptions, while playing through injury. Following the conclusion of the season, he announced his decision to return to Georgia for his senior year. Following an interception against Missouri, Sanders set the school record for career interception return yards. In the 2018 Rose Bowl, he intercepted a Baker Mayfield pass in the fourth quarter and returned it 38 yards to set up a crucial Georgia touchdown. The interception was Sanders' final of his collegiate career and tied him for the school-record for career interceptions with 16 total. In his final collegiate game against Alabama in the National Championship, Sanders missed his coverage of DeVonta Smith, resulting in the game winning touchdown for the Crimson Tide.

== Professional career ==
=== Dallas Cowboys ===
After going undrafted in the 2018 NFL draft, Sanders signed with the Dallas Cowboys as an undrafted free agent. On September 1, 2018, he was waived by the Cowboys.

=== Columbus Lions ===
On June 10, 2019, Sanders signed with the Columbus Lions of the National Arena League.

=== Spokane Shock ===
Sanders signed with the Spokane Shock of the Indoor Football League in 2020. He played two seasons with the Shock until the team folded following the conclusion of the 2022 season.
