= James Smith-Williams =

American football player (born 1997)

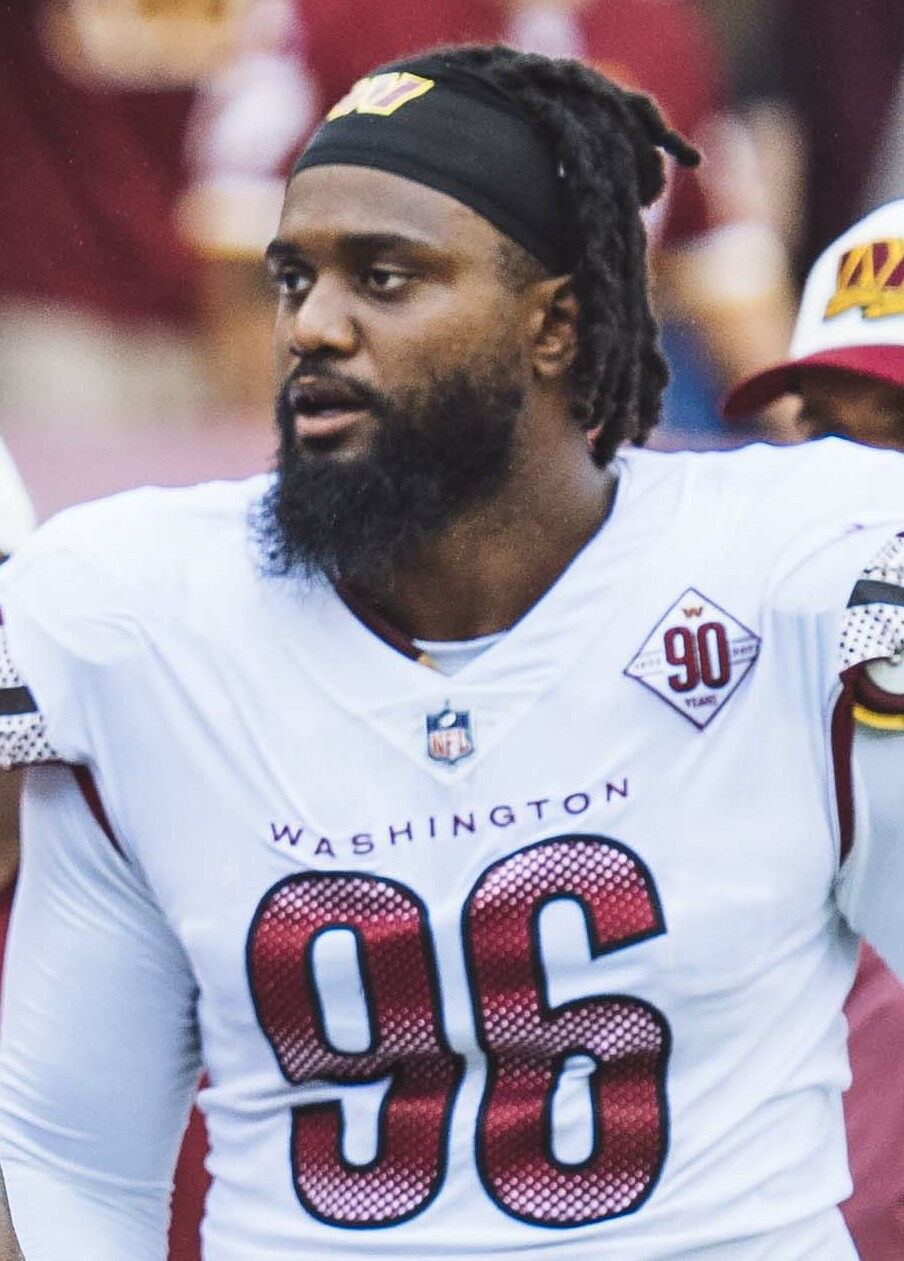
- Smith-Williams with the Washington Commanders in 2022

Profile
- Position: Linebacker

Personal information
- Born: July 30, 1997 (age 29); Raleigh, North Carolina, U.S.
- Listed height: 6 ft 4 in (1.93 m)
- Listed weight: 265 lb (120 kg)

Career information
- High school: Millbrook (Raleigh)
- College: NC State (2015–2019)
- NFL draft: 2020: 7th round, 229th overall pick

Career history
- Washington Football Team / Commanders (2020–2023); Atlanta Falcons (2024)

Career NFL statistics as of 2024
- Tackles: 109
- Sacks: 8
- Pass deflections: 2
- Stats at Pro Football Reference

James Smith-Williams (born July 30, 1997) is an American professional football linebacker. He played college football for the NC State Wolfpack and was selected by the Washington Football Team in the seventh round of the 2020 NFL draft.

== College career ==
A 3-star recruit, Smith-Williams committed to NC State over offers from Appalachian State, Boston College, and James Madison, among others. Smith-Williams posted 36 tackles, nine of which were for a loss, and six sacks in 2018. He was limited to seven games in 2019 and had 20 tackles and a sack. In his career, he played in 29 games and had 82 tackles, 12 tackles for loss, eight sacks, and three pass deflections. He graduated with a degree in business supply chain management.

== Professional career ==
Pre-draft measurables
Height	Weight	Arm length	Hand span	40-yard dash	10-yard split	20-yard split	20-yard shuttle	Three-cone drill	Vertical jump	Broad jump	Bench press
6 ft 3 5/8 in (1.92 m)	265 lb (120 kg)	33 3/4 in (0.86 m)	9 1/4 in (0.23 m)	4.60 s	1.62 s	2.69 s	4.52 s	7.35 s	32.0 in (0.81 m)	10 ft 3 in (3.12 m)	28 reps
All values from NFL Combine

=== Washington Football Team / Commanders ===
Smith-Williams was selected by the Washington Football Team in the seventh round (229th overall) of the 2020 NFL draft. He signed his four-year rookie contract on July 22, 2020.

In the Week 10 of the 2021 season, Smith-Williams had his first career start in place of an injured Montez Sweat. The following week, he and defensive tackle Daron Payne sealed the win over the Carolina Panthers after they sacked quarterback Cam Newton on fourth down with less than a minute and a half left in the game. On December 11, 2021, he was placed on COVID-19 reserve list and was forced to sit out the Week 14 game against the Dallas Cowboys, but reactivated a week later.

With defensive end Chase Young missing the majority of the 2022 season while he recovered from his ACL tear, Smith-Williams started 14 games in his place and finished with 23 total tackles, one pass defection, and three sacks.

Smith-Williams was elevated to the starting line up before Week 9 of the 2023 season following the Commanders trading both their original starting defensive ends, Young and Sweat.

=== Atlanta Falcons ===
On April 10, 2024, Smith-Williams signed with the Atlanta Falcons.

== Personal life ==
He served as an intern for IBM during college, specializing in robotic animation, and has a job offer with them following his football career.
