= 2017–18 College Football Playoff =

Postseason college football tournament

- Season: 2017
- Dates: January 1–8, 2018
- Teams invited: (1) Clemson; (2) Oklahoma; (3) Georgia; (4) Alabama
- Venues: Mercedes-Benz Stadium; Rose Bowl
- Champions: Alabama (2nd CFP title, 17th overall title)

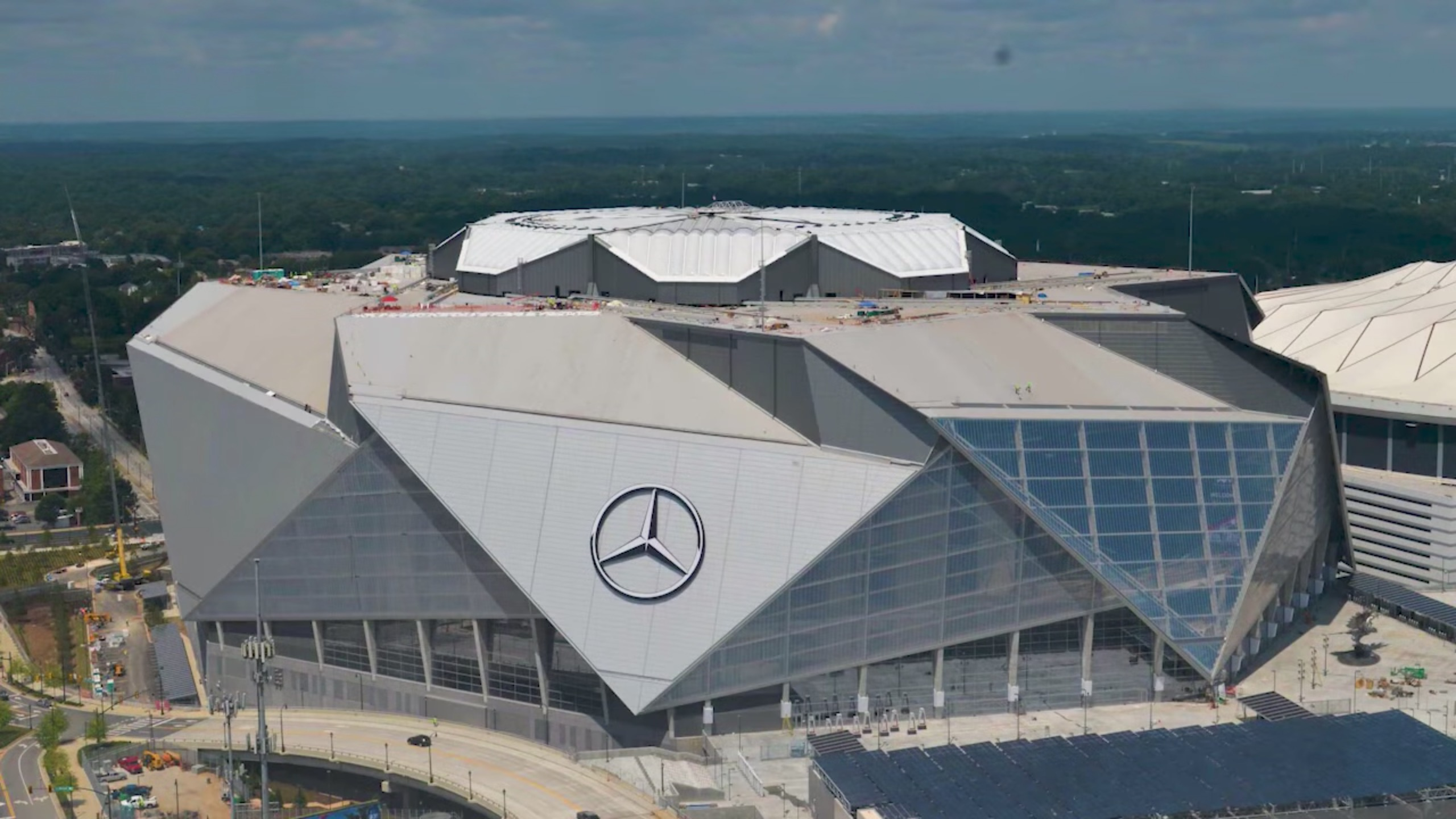
Mercedes-Benz Stadium in Atlanta, Georgia, hosted the College Football Playoff National Championship.

The 2017–18 College Football Playoff was a single-elimination postseason tournament that determined the national champion of the 2017 NCAA Division I FBS football season. It was the fourth edition of the College Football Playoff (CFP) and involved the top four teams in the country as ranked by the College Football Playoff poll playing in two semifinals, with the winners of each advancing to the national championship game. The four teams to participate were No. 1 Clemson from the Atlantic Coast Conference, No. 2 Oklahoma from the Big 12 Conference, and No. 3 Georgia and No. 4 Alabama, both from the Southeastern Conference. This was the first CFP to feature two teams from the same conference.

The playoff bracket's semifinal games were held at the Sugar Bowl and Rose Bowl on New Year's Day, part of the season's slate of bowl games. The Sugar Bowl semifinal, between Clemson and Alabama, was a rematch of the national championship games in 2016 and 2017; each team won one of those matchups. Their third game in three seasons was won by Alabama, 24–6. The second semifinal, played at the Rose Bowl, saw Georgia defeat Oklahoma by six points in double overtime; it was the first Rose Bowl Game to reach overtime. By virtue of their victories, Alabama and Georgia advanced to the national championship game, held on January 8, 2018 in Atlanta. It was the first national championship matchup between two teams from the same conference since the 2012 BCS National Championship Game between Alabama and LSU. In the championship game, Alabama defeated Georgia in overtime, 26–23, to win their second CFP national championship and their seventeenth national championship in school history.

The three-game playoff recorded a viewership increase of 21% over the previous edition, with an average of 26.2 million viewers. The national championship game averaged 28.4 million, with a peak of 30.7 million, and marked a 13% year-over-year increase. This made it the second-most-watched cable broadcast in history behind the inaugural CFP national championship between Ohio State and Oregon.

== Bracket ==
Semifinals
January 1 – Sugar Bowl Mercedes-Benz Superdome, New Orleans
1	Clemson	6
4	Alabama	24
January 1 – Rose Bowl Rose Bowl Stadium, Pasadena
2	Oklahoma	48
3	Georgia (2OT)	54

Championship
January 8 – Championship Mercedes-Benz Stadium, Atlanta
4	Alabama (OT)	26
3	Georgia	23

== Selection and teams ==
The 2017–18 CFP selection committee was chaired by Texas Tech athletic director Kirby Hocutt. Its other members were former Virginia Tech head coach Frank Beamer, former Southern Miss head coach Jeff Bower, former Central Michigan athletic director Herb Deromedi, Robert Morris University president Christopher B. Howard, former NCAA executive vice president Tom Jernstedt, former head coach Bobby Johnson, Arkansas athletic director and former CFP selection committee chairman Jeff Long, Oregon athletic director Rob Mullens, Clemson athletic director Dan Radakovich, Ohio State athletic director Gene Smith, former USA Today reporter Steve Wieberg, and former college head coach Tyrone Willingham.

The 2017 season's first CFP rankings were released on October 31, with four conferences represented in the top six: No. 1 Georgia and No. 2 Alabama from the Southeastern Conference (SEC), No. 3 Notre Dame, an FBS independent, No. 4 Clemson from the Atlantic Coast Conference (ACC), No. 5 Oklahoma from the Big 12 Conference, and No. 6 Ohio State from the Big Ten Conference. Two upsets in the Big Ten on the following Saturday, Iowa over No. 6 Ohio State and No. 24 Michigan State over No. 7 Penn State, allowed TCU to jump from No. 8 to No. 6 in the second rankings release, while the top five remained steady. Georgia fell from No. 1 the following week after a loss to No. 10 Auburn; a "dominant win" by No. 7 Miami (FL) over No. 3 Notre Dame and No. 5 Oklahoma's defeat of No. 6 TCU also contributed to a shakeup in the next edition of the rankings, which saw Alabama rise to No. 1, Clemson and Miami jump to No. 2 and No. 3, and Wisconsin and Auburn enter the top six at Nos. 5 and 6. Miami rose to No. 2 the following week, swapping spots with Clemson, in the only changes within the top six. This was not the case during the final week of the regular season, as the Hurricanes were upset by Pittsburgh, marking their first loss and, according to the Port Charlotte Sun, ending their "dream season". The following day, No. 6 Auburn defeated No. 1 Alabama in the Iron Bowl to win the SEC West Division title, and a win by No. 21 Stanford over No. 8 Notre Dame similarly gave them a berth to their respective conference championship. Clemson moved to No. 1 the following week, with Auburn jumping to become the new No. 2 team.

The following weekend saw each conference play their respective championship game. No. 10 USC was first to win, beating No. 12 Stanford in the Pac-12 Championship. No. 1 Clemson's 35-point ACC Championship victory over No. 7 Miami all but guaranteed them a playoff bid, and similar reactions resulted from No. 3 Oklahoma's win over No. 11 TCU in the Big 12 Championship. Both Clemson and Oklahoma's wins marked their third consecutive conference championships. Meanwhile, No. 6 Georgia claimed the SEC title in a rematch with No. 2 Auburn—the first rematch in series history—and No. 8 Ohio State upset No. 4 Wisconsin for the Big Ten crown.

The final CFP rankings, and the resulting four-team playoff field, were revealed on December 3. Clemson remained at No. 1 and were joined in the top four by fellow conference champions No. 2 Oklahoma and No. 3 Georgia. The No. 4 spot was awarded to Alabama, marking the first time two teams from the same conference were selected to participate in the playoff. With only three of the Power Five conferences represented, it was the first playoff without a representative from the Big Ten and the second without a Pac-12 participant. Alabama's inclusion over Ohio State, who was ranked No. 5, generated criticism from some, including Dan Wolken of USA Today, who said that Ohio State had been punished for its more difficult early-season non-conference schedule and that Alabama had seemingly been rewarded for their reputation and their loss to Auburn, meaning they did not have to risk a loss in the SEC Championship. The Buckeyes were paired with No. 8 USC in the Cotton Bowl Classic, while No. 6 Wisconsin and No. 10 Miami were assigned to the Orange Bowl. Additionally, No. 9 Penn State and No. 11 Washington were assigned to the Fiesta Bowl, and No. 7 Auburn was matched with No. 12 UCF in the Peach Bowl.

2017 College Football Playoff rankings top six progression
No.	Week 9	Week 10	Week 11	Week 12	Week 13	Final
1	Georgia (8–0)	Georgia (9–0)	Alabama (10–0)	Alabama (11–0)	Clemson (11–1)	Clemson (12–1)
2	Alabama (8–0)	Alabama (9–0)	Clemson (9–1)	Miami (FL) (10–0)	Auburn (10–2)	Oklahoma (12–1)
3	Notre Dame (7–1)	Notre Dame (8–1)	Miami (FL) (9–0)	Clemson (10–1)	Oklahoma (11–1)	Georgia (12–1)
4	Clemson (7–1)	Clemson (8–1)	Oklahoma (9–1)	Oklahoma (10–1)	Wisconsin (12–0)	Alabama (11–1)
5	Oklahoma (7–1)	Oklahoma (8–1)	Wisconsin (10–0)	Wisconsin (11–0)	Alabama (11–1)	Ohio State (11–2)
6	Ohio State (7–1)	TCU (8–1)	Auburn (8–2)	Auburn (9–2)	Georgia (11–1)	Wisconsin (12–1)

Key: Team increased ranking from previous week Team decreased ranking from previous week Team selected to College Football Playoff

== Playoff games ==
=== Semifinals ===
==== Rose Bowl ====
2018 Rose Bowl

Quarter	1	2	3	4	OT	2OT	Total
No. 3 Georgia	7	10	14	14	3	6	54
No. 2 Oklahoma	14	17	0	14	3	0	48

at the Rose Bowl • Pasadena, California

- Date: January 1, 2018
- Game time: 2:00 p.m. PST

The 2018 Rose Bowl Game marked the first meeting between No. 2 Oklahoma and No. 3 Georgia, and the second Rose Bowl appearance in each school's respective history (Oklahoma in 2003 and Georgia in 1943). Six of the game's first eight drives resulted in scores, with Rodney Anderson and Marquise Brown scoring touchdowns for the Sooners and Sony Michel doing the same for the Bulldogs. After an Austin Seibert field goal extended Oklahoma's lead to ten points with under ten minutes remaining in the second quarter, three punts followed before Oklahoma scored again on a pass from Baker Mayfield to CeeDee Lamb. Oklahoma led 31–17 at halftime, but touchdowns by Michel and Nick Chubb tied the game as it entered the fourth quarter. Each team scored twice in the fourth quarter, including a 46-yard fumble return by Oklahoma's Steven Parker, before regulation ended with the teams tied at 45. Each team scored a field goal in overtime before Georgia clinched a victory on a 27-yard touchdown rush by Michel. It was the highest-scoring game in Rose Bowl history and the first Rose Bowl or CFP game to reach overtime.

==== Sugar Bowl ====
2018 Sugar Bowl

Quarter	1	2	3	4	Total
No. 4 Alabama	10	0	14	0	24
No. 1 Clemson	0	3	3	0	6

at Mercedes-Benz Superdome • New Orleans, Louisiana

- Date: January 1, 2018
- Game time: 8:00 p.m. CST

The Sugar Bowl semifinal matched No. 1 Clemson and No. 4 Alabama in a rematch of the 2016 and 2017 national championship games. The Crimson Tide scored the game's first ten points, and led 10–3 at halftime following a field goal by Alex Spence. A fumble by Alabama quarterback Jalen Hurts early in the third quarter gave possession to Clemson on the Alabama 20-yard line, and the Tigers ultimately added another field goal as a result. Later in the quarter, Alabama's Da'Ron Payne intercepted Kelly Bryant and set the Crimson Tide up to score on a touchdown pass, which he caught, several plays later. On Clemson's next offensive play, Bryant was intercepted again, this time by Mack Wilson for a touchdown, Alabama's second in thirteen seconds of game time. Those touchdowns were the game's final scoring plays; starting with five and a half minutes left in the third quarter, each team punted on their next three possessions. Clemson's final drive began with seven minutes left in the game and spanned 75 yards in 18 plays before Bryant's incomplete pass on 4th & Goal from the Alabama 5-yard line sealed the Crimson Tide's victory.

=== Championship game ===
2018 College Football Playoff National Championship

Quarter	1	2	3	4	OT	Total
No. 4 Alabama	0	0	10	10	6	26
No. 3 Georgia	0	13	7	0	3	23

at Mercedes-Benz Stadium • Atlanta, Georgia

- Date: January 8, 2018
- Game time: 7:30 p.m. CST

Georgia and Alabama's playoff wins set them up to meet in the national championship game, the first to be contested by teams from the same conference since 2012. After a scoreless first quarter, Georgia took a 13–0 lead into halftime with two Rodrigo Blankenship field goals and a Mecole Hardman touchdown rush, the latter on Georgia's last offensive snap of the half. Alabama head coach Nick Saban opted to change quarterbacks to begin the second half, from starter Jalen Hurts to backup Tua Tagovailoa, and the Tide broke their scoring drought with a touchdown pass to Henry Ruggs on their second drive of the second half. Georgia responded with a touchdown pass of their own, from Jake Fromm to Hardman, and the teams traded interceptions on each of their next drives. Alabama ended regulation having scored 13 unanswered points to tie the game at 20 points apiece following an unsuccessful field goal attempt as time expired. Georgia took possession to start overtime and finished their series with a 51-yard field goal by Blankenship, giving them a three-point lead. Bulldogs defensive linemen Jonathan Ledbetter and Davin Bellamy sacked Tagovailoa on Alabama's first snap of overtime before Tagovailoa passed to DeVonta Smith for a 41-yard walk-off touchdown, winning Alabama the title.

== Aftermath ==
Alabama improved to a final record of 13–1 with their national championship victory, the fifth for Saban at Alabama and his sixth all-time. It was Alabama's second national championship of the CFP era—they defeated Clemson in the 2016 College Football Playoff National Championship—and their seventeenth claimed national title in school history.

The national championship saw viewership increase by 13% across its MegaCast coverage on ESPN, ESPN2, and ESPNU combined, with an average of 28.4 million viewers and a peak of 30.7 million. The playoff as a whole saw a viewership increase of 21% over the previous year with an average of 26.2 million viewers. It was the second-most-watched cable broadcast ever, second only to the inaugural CFP national championship.
