= 2018 College Football Playoff National Championship =

2018 College Football Playoff National Championship presented by AT&T
- 4th College Football Playoff National Championship
Alabama Crimson Tide	Georgia Bulldogs
(12–1)	(13–1)
SEC	SEC
26	23
Head coach: Nick Saban	Head coach: Kirby Smart
AP / Coaches / CFP; 4 / 4 / 4	AP / Coaches / CFP; 3 / 3 / 3
	1	2	3	4	OT	Total
Alabama	0	0	10	10	6	26
Georgia	0	13	7	0	3	23
- Date: January 8, 2018
- Season: 2017
- Stadium: Mercedes-Benz Stadium
- Location: Atlanta, Georgia
- MVP: Tua Tagovailoa (Alabama, QB); Daron Payne (Alabama, DT)
- Favorite: Alabama by 3½
- National anthem: Zac Brown Band
- Referee: Dan Capron (Big Ten)
- Halftime show: Georgia Redcoat Marching Band; Million Dollar Band
- Attendance: 77,430

United States TV coverage
- Network: ESPN and ESPN Radio
- Announcers: Chris Fowler (play-by-play); Kirk Herbstreit (analyst); Maria Taylor and Tom Rinaldi (sideline) (ESPN); Sean McDonough, Todd Blackledge, Holly Rowe and Ian Fitzsimmons (ESPN Radio)
- Nielsen ratings: 16.7 (28.44 million viewers)

International TV coverage
- Network: ESPN Deportes; ESPN Deportes Radio
- Announcers: Lalo Varela and Pablo Viruega (ESPN Deportes); Kenneth Garay and Sebastian Martinez (ESPN Deportes Radio)

The 2018 College Football Playoff National Championship was a college football bowl game played on January 8, 2018, at Mercedes-Benz Stadium in Atlanta, Georgia, and was televised nationally by ESPN. The fourth College Football Playoff National Championship, the game determined a national champion in the NCAA Division I Football Bowl Subdivision for the 2017 season. It was the final game of the 2017-18 College Football Playoff (CFP) and, aside from the all star games following this, was the culminating game of the 2017-18 bowl season. Sponsored by telecommunications company AT&T, the game was officially known as the 2018 College Football Playoff National Championship presented by AT&T.

The Alabama Crimson Tide came back from a 13–0 deficit at halftime to defeat the Georgia Bulldogs 26–23. This was the first CFP National Championship game to be decided in overtime, and the first overtime National Championship game since the 2003 Fiesta Bowl. True freshman quarterback Tua Tagovailoa and defensive tackle Daron Payne were respectively named the offensive and defensive players of the game.

The College Football Playoff selection committee chose the semifinalists following the conclusion of the 2017 regular season. Alabama and Georgia advanced to the national championship after winning the semifinal games hosted by the Sugar Bowl and Rose Bowl Game, respectively, on January 1, 2018.

== Background ==
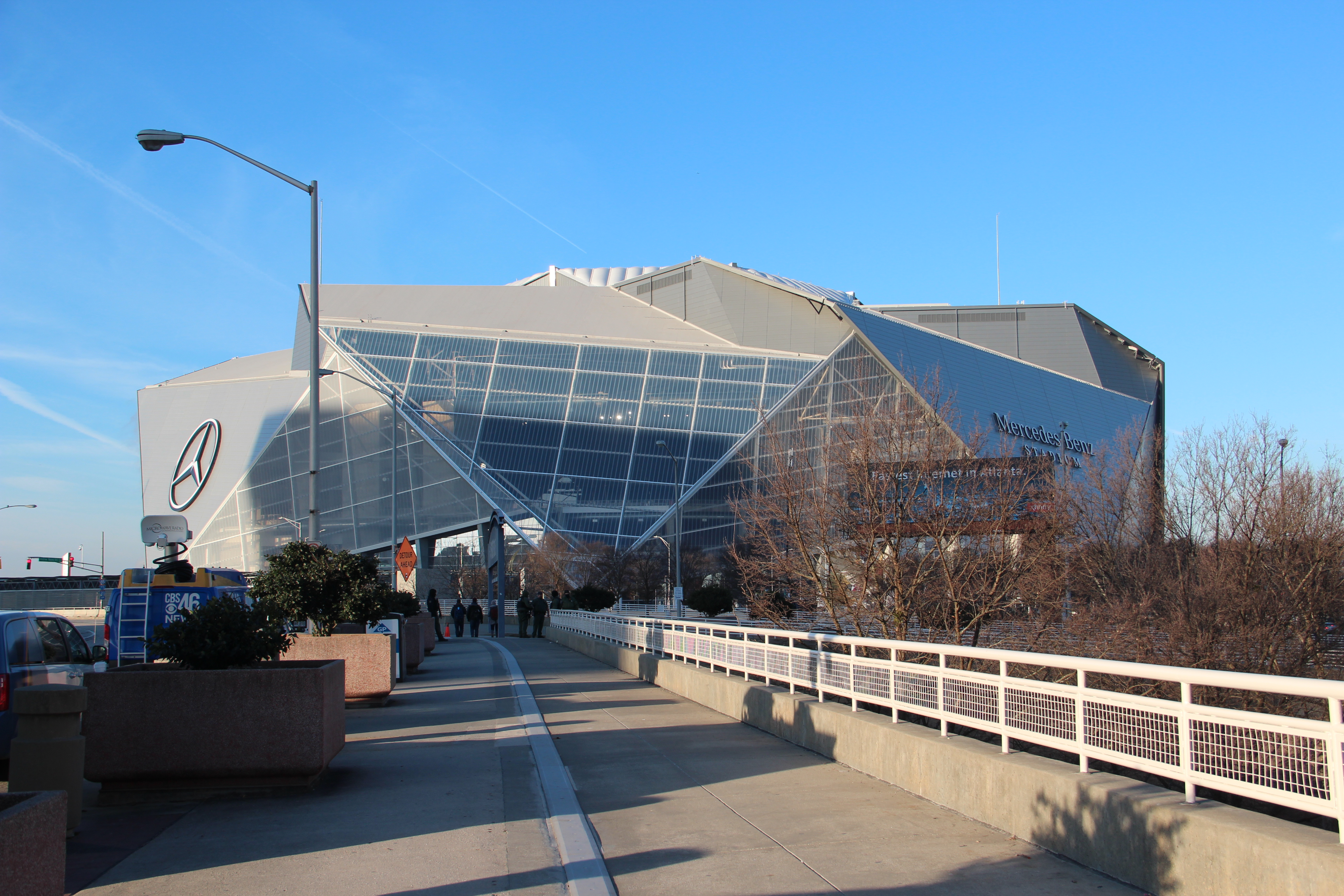
The 2018 College Football Playoff National Championship took place at Mercedes-Benz Stadium

The Mercedes-Benz Stadium in Atlanta, Georgia was announced as the host site for the fourth College Football National Championship on November 4, 2015.

== Teams ==
The 2018 College Football Playoff National Championship featured the No. 4 Alabama Crimson Tide and the No. 3 Georgia Bulldogs. It was the teams' 68th meeting, with Alabama leading the series 37–25–4.

=== Alabama ===
The Alabama Crimson Tide defeated the Clemson Tigers in the 2018 Sugar Bowl by a score of 24–6 to reach the championship game. The Tide had a 12–1 season, becoming the SEC West Division co-champions with the Auburn Tigers. The Crimson Tide were coached by Nick Saban.

=== Georgia ===
The Georgia Bulldogs defeated the Oklahoma Sooners in the 2018 Rose Bowl by a score of 54–48 in double overtime to reach the championship game. The Bulldogs had a 13–1 season claiming their 13th Southeastern Conference (SEC) championship with a rematch victory over the Auburn Tigers, 28–7. The Bulldogs were coached by Kirby Smart. This was Georgia’s first appearance in a designated national championship game since the 1983 Sugar Bowl.

== Starting lineups ==
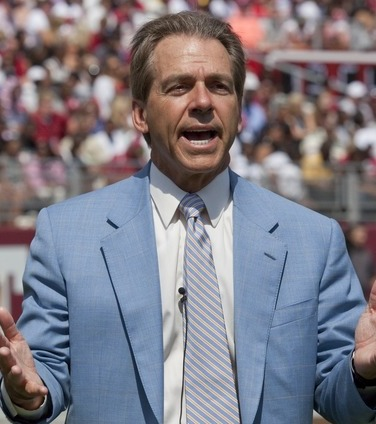
Alabama head coach Nick Saban

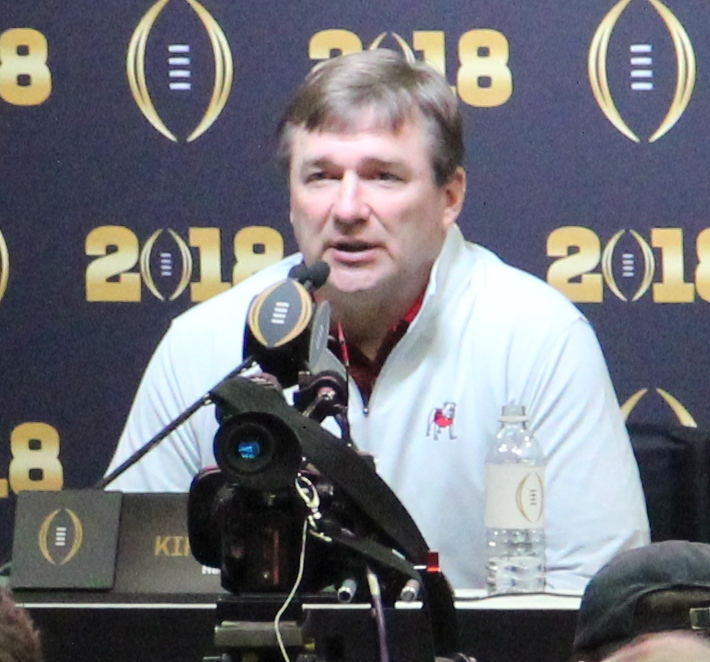
Georgia head coach Kirby Smart

Alabama	Position	Position	Georgia
Offense
Calvin Ridley 1	WR		Javon Wims 7
Cam Sims	WR		Riley Ridley 4
Jonah Williams 1	LT		Isaiah Wynn 1
Ross Pierschbacher 5	LG		Kendall Baker
Bradley Bozeman 6	C		Lamont Gaillard 6
J. C. Hassenauer	RG		Ben Cleveland 3
Matt Womack	RT		Andrew Thomas 1
Hale Hentges	TE	TB	Nick Chubb 2
Robert Foster	WR		Terry Godwin 7
Jalen Hurts 2	QB		Jake Fromm 5
Damien Harris 3	RB		Sony Michel 1
Defense
Da'Shawn Hand 4	DE		David Marshall
Daron Payne 1	NG		John Atkins
Isaiah Buggs 6	DL	DT	Tyler Clark
Terrell Lewis 3	SLB	LB	Davin Bellamy
Mack Wilson 5	MLB	LB	Reggie Carter
Rashaan Evans 1	WLB	LB	† Roquan Smith 1
Deionte Thompson 5	DB		Malkom Parrish
Anthony Averett 4	CB		Deandre Baker 1
Levi Wallace	CB		Aaron Davis
† Minkah Fitzpatrick 1	SS	S	Dominick Sanders
Ronnie Harrison 3	FS	CB	J. R. Reed
† = 2017 All-American
Selected in an NFL Draft (number corresponds to draft round)

== Game summary ==
=== First half ===
After winning the coin toss, Alabama deferred to the second half and Georgia received the ball to begin the game. After two plays, quarterback Jake Fromm attempted a pass downfield and was intercepted by Tony Brown. Alabama began their first drive of the game, and, after eleven plays, that drive ended with kicker Andy Pappanastos missing a 40-yard field goal. The teams each had three-and-outs for the game's first two punts. During Georgia's ensuing drive, the quarter ended, with no score.

After a failed third down conversion, on the second play of the second quarter, Georgia kicker Rodrigo Blankenship hit a 41-yard field goal to open the scoring and put Georgia in the lead by three. Alabama's ensuing drive went nowhere, as they gained four yards on three plays and punted. Georgia took the ball and drove down the field, and found themselves with a first and goal at the Alabama 10-yard-line; the Tide defense held, however, and the Bulldogs settled for a second field goal and took a 6–0 lead with just over seven and a half minutes until half. On Alabama's next drive, the Georgia defense held yet again and Alabama's J. K. Scott punted for the third time. Just prior to the punt, Georgia wide receiver Javon Wims was shown walking to the locker room, reportedly with a left shoulder injury. Both defenses then forced punts, and Georgia took back over with 1:19 remaining in the half on their own 31-yard-line. Nine plays later, on Alabama's 1-yard-line, Mecole Hardman took a direct snap, faked a handoff, and ran into the end zone for the game's first touchdown, putting Georgia up 13–0 going into halftime.

=== Second half ===
Because they deferred the coin toss, Alabama received the ball first in the second half. They started their drive on their own 22-yard-line. Tua Tagovailoa, Alabama's backup quarterback, started the second half for the Tide; that drive quickly resulted in a three-and-out. The initial punt was blocked, but an offside call gave the Tide another chance to punt. Georgia started their drive on their own 36-yard-line, but punted on 4th & 17. Alabama took over on their own 44-yard-line. The teams then traded touchdowns on consecutive drives; Alabama scored their first points of the game on a 6-yard pass from Tagovailoa to Ruggs, but Georgia immediately responded with an 80-yard touchdown connection from Fromm to Mecole Hardman, putting Georgia up 20–7. On the second play of Alabama's ensuing drive, Tagovailoa, while scrambling to the left, threw into traffic and was intercepted by Georgia's Deandre Baker. Up 13, the Bulldogs took over possession of the ball on Alabama's 39-yard-line. The Tide defense responded immediately, however, as Raekwon Davis intercepted a Jake Fromm pass on the first play of Georgia's drive, returning the pick to the UGA 40-yard-line. The Tide gained fifteen yards on six plays and kicker Andy Pappanastos avenged his earlier miss with a 43-yard field goal that put Bama within ten. The teams then traded punts. Just prior to Alabama's punt, it was announced that an Alabama defensive back, Kyriq McDonald, had collapsed on the sideline; the situation was described as a "serious medical emergency". He was loaded onto a medical stretcher awake and conscious. Georgia could not muster anything on offense that drive, and punted. The fourth quarter saw Tagovailoa lead the Tide to come back and tie the game at 20 with 3:49. Alabama regained possession, and with three seconds remaining in the game, Andy Pappanastos missed a potential game-winning 36-yard field goal wide left, sending the CFP Championship to overtime, the first in the era.

=== Overtime ===
In overtime, Georgia had an unsuccessful drive that resulted in both a three-and-out, and a 13-yard loss sack to Fromm. Georgia opted to attempt a 51-yard field goal, which they made. On Alabama's first offensive play in overtime, Tagovailoa was sacked for a 16-yard loss but immediately followed that with a game-winning 41-yard touchdown pass to DeVonta Smith, in a play that has since been called 2nd and 26 by fans. Tagovailoa was named the offensive player of the game, and Daron Payne was named the defensive player of the game.

=== Scoring summary ===
2018 College Football Playoff National Championship

Quarter	1	2	3	4	OT	Total
No. 4 Alabama	0	0	10	10	6	26
No. 3 Georgia	0	13	7	0	3	23

at Mercedes-Benz Stadium • Atlanta, Georgia

- Date: Monday, January 8, 2018
- Game time: 8:00 p.m. EST
- Game weather: Indoors
- Game attendance: 77,430
- Referee: Dan Capron (Big Ten)
- TV announcers (ESPN): Chris Fowler (play-by-play), Kirk Herbstreit (analyst), Maria Taylor and Tom Rinaldi (sidelines)
- Box score

Scoring summary

Quarter	Time	Drive			Team	Scoring information	Score	
Quarter	Time	Plays	Yards	TOP	Team	Scoring information	Alabama	Georgia
2	14:14	14	55	7:40	Georgia	41-yard field goal by Rodrigo Blankenship	0	3
2	7:33	13	70	5:19	Georgia	27-yard field goal by Rodrigo Blankenship	0	6
2	0:07	9	69	1:12	Georgia	Mecole Hardman 1-yard touchdown run, Rodrigo Blankenship kick good	0	13
3	8:52	7	56	1:59	Alabama	Henry Ruggs III 6-yard touchdown reception from Tua Tagovailoa, Andy Pappanastos kick good	7	13
3	6:52	4	93	1:55	Georgia	Mecole Hardman 80-yard touchdown reception from Jake Fromm, Rodrigo Blankenship kick good	7	20
3	5:20	6	15	1:06	Alabama	43-yard field goal by Andy Pappanastos	10	20
4	9:24	8	71	2:15	Alabama	30-yard field goal by Andy Pappanastos	13	20
4	3:49	8	66	3:21	Alabama	Calvin Ridley 7-yard touchdown reception from Tua Tagovailoa, Andy Pappanastos kick good	20	20
OT		4	-9		Georgia	51-yard field goal by Rodrigo Blankenship	20	23
OT		2	25		Alabama	DeVonta Smith 41-yard touchdown reception from Tua Tagovailoa	26	23
"TOP" = time of possession. For other American football terms, see Glossary of American football.							26	23

=== Statistics ===
Statistics	Alabama	Georgia
First downs	20	22
Plays–yards	71–371	77–365
Rushes–yards	39–184	45–133
Passing yards	187	232
Passing: Comp–Att–Int	17–32–1	16–32–2
Time of possession	26:17	33:43
Sources: ESPN, StatBroadcast

Team	Category	Player	Statistics
Alabama	Passing	Tua Tagovailoa	14/24, 166 yds, 3 TD, 1 INT
Alabama	Rushing	Najee Harris	6 car, 64 yds
Alabama	Receiving	Calvin Ridley	4 rec, 32 yds, 1 TD
Georgia	Passing	Jake Fromm	16/32, 232 yds, 1 TD, 2 INT
Georgia	Rushing	Sony Michel	14 car, 98 yds
Georgia	Receiving	Riley Ridley	6 rec, 82 yds
Sources: ESPN, StatBroadcast

== Broadcasting ==
The game was televised nationally by ESPN and ESPN Radio. On January 8, 2018, the network announced that its broadcast would feature a live performance by Kendrick Lamar during halftime. This performance was separate from the event proper at Mercedes-Benz Stadium (which featured a traditional halftime show with the marching bands of the participating teams), and originated from Centennial Olympic Park.

== See also ==
- Alabama–Georgia football rivalry
- College football national championships in NCAA Division I FBS
- List of nicknamed college football games and plays
- Super Bowl LIII, the NFL championship game contested at the same venue on February 3, 2019
