= Daron Payne =

American football player (born 1997)

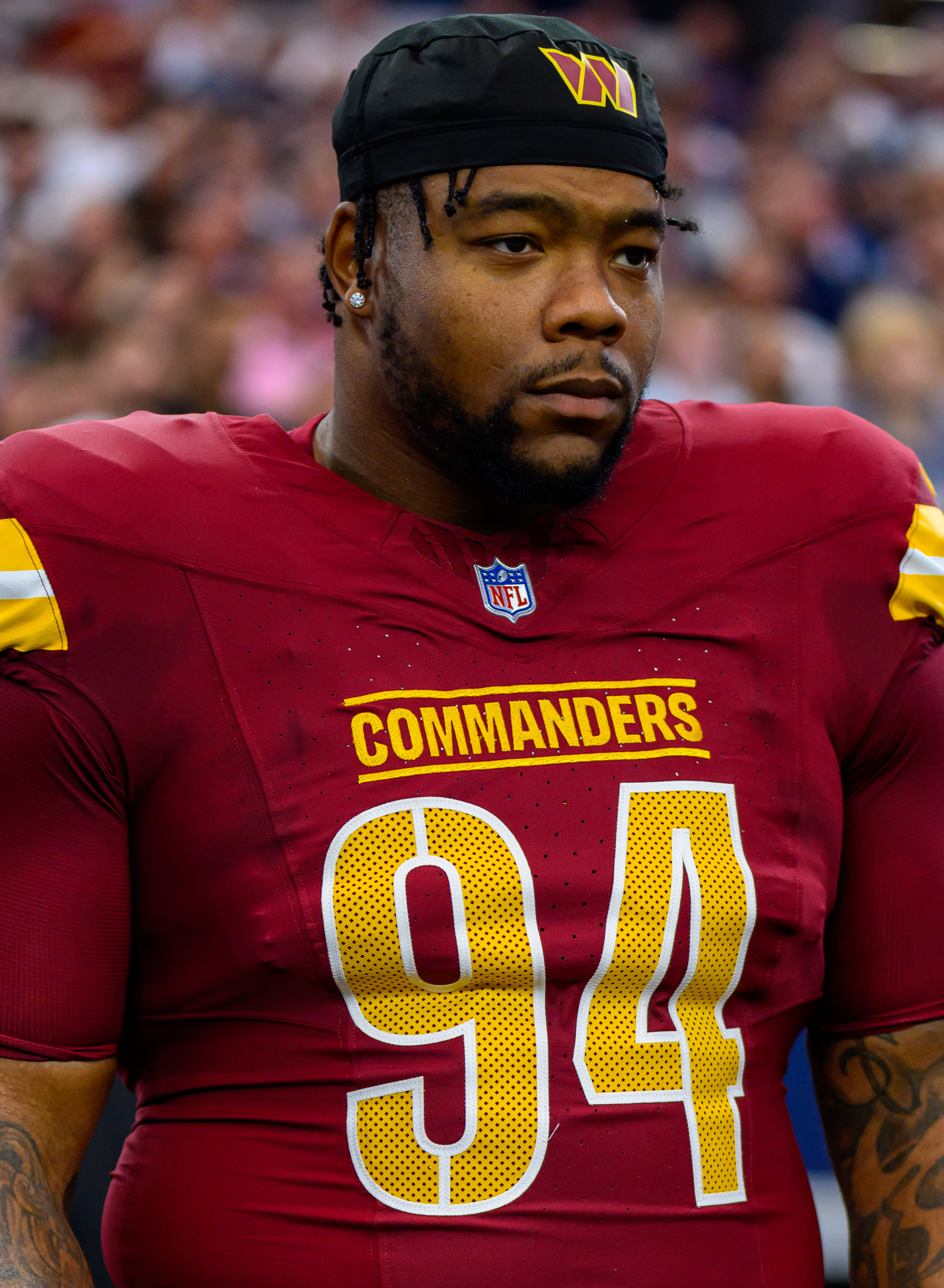
- Payne with the Washington Commanders in 2025

No. 94 – Washington Commanders
- Position: Defensive tackle
- Roster status: Injured reserve

Personal information
- Born: May 27, 1997 (age 29); Birmingham, Alabama, U.S.
- Listed height: 6 ft 3 in (1.91 m)
- Listed weight: 320 lb (145 kg)

Career information
- High school: Shades Valley (Irondale, Alabama)
- College: Alabama (2015–2017)
- NFL draft: 2018: 1st round, 13th overall pick

Career history
- Washington Redskins / Football Team / Commanders (2018–present)

Awards and highlights
- Pro Bowl (2022); PFWA All-Rookie Team (2018); 2× CFP national champion (2015, 2017); CFP national championship defensive MVP (2018); Freshman All-American (2015); First-team All-SEC (2017)

Career NFL statistics as of 2026
- Tackles: 446
- Sacks: 38
- Forced fumbles: 8
- Fumble recoveries: 6
- Pass deflections: 25
- Interceptions: 1
- Stats at Pro Football Reference

Daron Cordell Payne (/dəˈrɒn/ də-RON; born May 27, 1997) is an American professional football defensive tackle for the Washington Commanders of the National Football League (NFL). He played college football for the Alabama Crimson Tide, where he won national championships in 2015 and 2017. Payne was selected by Washington in the first round of the 2018 NFL draft.

== Early life ==
Payne was born on May 27, 1997, in Birmingham, Alabama. He attended Shades Valley High School in Irondale, Alabama, where he played football. He was rated as a five-star recruit and committed to the University of Alabama to play college football.

== College career ==
As a true freshman at Alabama in 2015, Payne had 13 tackles and half a sack. As a sophomore in 2016, he had 36 tackles and 1.5 sacks. In the National Championship Game against Clemson, he recorded five tackles and a half sack.

As a junior in 2017, Payne was named the defensive MVP of both postseason games that Alabama played. In the Sugar Bowl versus Clemson, he intercepted a ball and scored an offensive receiving touchdown on the resulting drive. In the National Championship Game against Georgia, Payne had six tackles to help lead Alabama to their second national championship in three seasons. After his junior year, Payne declared his intentions to enter the 2018 NFL draft. During his time at Alabama, Payne's given name was commonly misspelled as Da'Ron, which he requested to change back to Daron for his professional career.

== Professional career ==
Pre-draft measurables
Height	Weight	Arm length	Hand span	Wingspan	40-yard dash	10-yard split	20-yard split	20-yard shuttle	Three-cone drill	Vertical jump	Broad jump	Bench press
6 ft 2 1/2 in (1.89 m)	311 lb (141 kg)	33 in (0.84 m)	9 3/8 in (0.24 m)	6 ft 6 3/8 in (1.99 m)	4.95 s	1.67 s	2.84 s	4.71 s	7.58 s	28.5 in (0.72 m)	8 ft 11 in (2.72 m)	27 reps
All values from NFL Combine

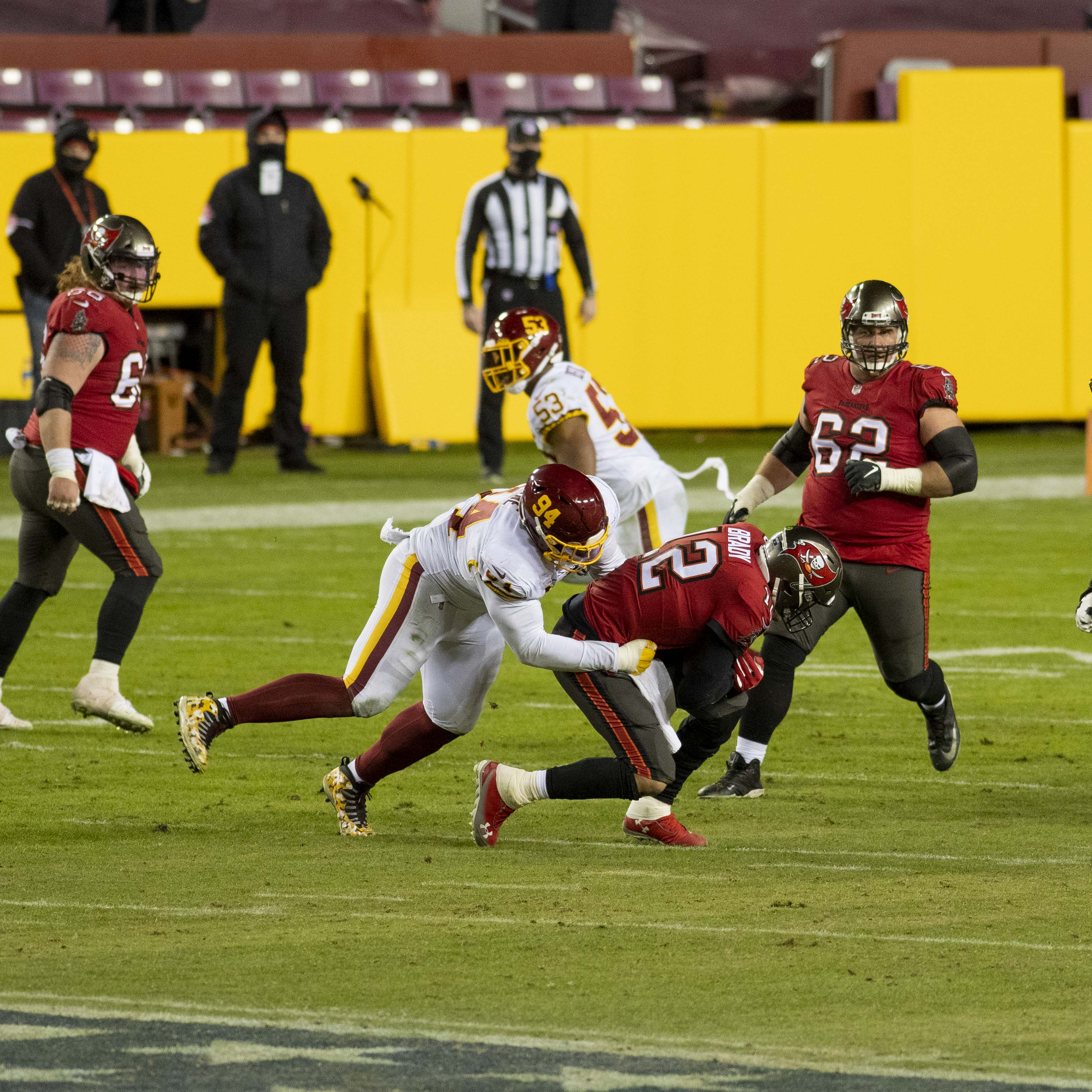
Payne sacking Tampa Bay Buccaneers quarterback Tom Brady in the 2020–21 Wild Card Playoff game

Payne was selected by the Washington Redskins in the first round (13th overall) of the 2018 NFL draft. On May 10, 2018, Payne signed a four-year contract worth US$14.4 million featuring a $8.56 million signing bonus. He recorded his first career sack in Week 3 against the Green Bay Packers. He finished his rookie season with 56 tackles, five sacks, a forced fumble and fumble recovery, and was named to the 2018 PFWA All-Rookie Team as a result.

In the 2019 season, Payne had two sacks, 56 total tackles (32 solo), and two passes defended.

In Week 14 of the 2020 season against the San Francisco 49ers, Payne forced a fumble on quarterback Nick Mullens, which was recovered and returned for a touchdown by Chase Young and would also recover a forced fumble by Young. In Week 15 against the Seattle Seahawks, Payne recorded his first career interception off a pass thrown by Russell Wilson during the 20–15 loss. Payne finished the 2020 NFL season playing 880 snaps and recording 54 tackles, 3 sacks, 3 forced fumbles, and an interception. He also recorded two sacks against Tom Brady and the Tampa Bay Buccaneers in the wild-card round of the playoffs.

The team exercised the fifth-year option on Payne's contract on April 27, 2021, which guarantees a salary of $8.529 million for the 2022 season. He was added to the COVID-19 reserve list on August 1, 2021, before being re-activated on August 5. Payne and defensive end James Smith-Williams sealed the Week 11 win over the Carolina Panthers after they sacked quarterback Cam Newton on fourth down with less than a minute and a half left in the game. In the 2021 season, Payne had 4.5 sacks, 61 total tackles (35 solo), and one fumble recovery.

By Week 9 of the 2022 season, Payne accumulated a new career-high of 5.5 sacks. With 58 seconds remaining in the Week 12 game against the Atlanta Falcons, he deflected a likely touchdown pass attempt from Marcus Mariota which cornerback Kendall Fuller intercepted in the end zone in a 19–13 win. He finished the season having set new career highs with 64 tackles, 11.5 sacks, and five pass deflections. In January 2023, Payne was named as a replacement player for Aaron Donald to the 2023 Pro Bowl, his first Pro Bowl.

The Commanders placed a non-exclusive franchise tag on Payne before him signing a four-year, $90 million extension with the team on March 13, 2023. He finished the 2023 season with four sacks, 53 total tackles (32 solo), four passes defended, two forced fumbles, and two fumble recoveries.

Payne finished the 2024 regular season with 42 tackles, four sacks, and two pass deflections over 17 games. In his second playoff appearance, Payne dislocated his thumb in the 2024–25 Wild Card round win over the Buccaneers. Despite the injury, he would play the following week in the win over the Detroit Lions but was ruled out of the NFC Championship Game due to injuries with his thumb and knee.

In the debut game of the 2025 season, Payne had a strong performance against the New York Giants with five total tackles, two passes deflections, and one sack. In Week 10, Payne was ejected from the game against the Detroit Lions after punching Amon-Ra St. Brown. Following the game, it was revealed Payne had retaliated against St. Brown, who had punched Payne in the head a few plays earlier and was not ejected despite an official witnessing the strike by St. Brown. On November 10, 2025, the NFL suspended Payne for one game without pay as punishment for the altercation with St. Brown which was met with criticism due to St. Brown only being issued a fine by the league for same offense. He finished the 2025 season with three sacks, 46 total tackles (20 solo), and five passes defended.

On October 30, 2026, Payne suffered a foot injury during a team practice with the team confirming the next day that Payne would miss the remainder of the 2026 season due to a Jones fracture. Four days later, he was placed on injured reserve.

== Career statistics ==
=== NFL ===
Legend
	Led the league
**Bold**	Career high

==== Regular season ====
Year	Team	Games		Tackles						Fumbles				Interceptions					
Year	Team	GP	GS	Cmb	Solo	Ast	Sck	Sfty	TFL	FF	FR	Yds	TD	PD	Int	Yds	Avg	Lng	TD
2018	WAS	16	16	56	**35**	21	5.0	0	6	1	1	**9**	0	3	0	0	0.0	0	0
2019	WAS	15	9	56	32	24	2.0	0	3	0	0	0	0	2	0	0	0.0	0	0
2020	WAS	16	16	54	27	27	3.0	0	7	**3**	1	0	0	4	0	0	0.0	0	0
2021	WAS	17	17	61	**35**	26	4.5	0	6	0	1	6	0	0	**1**	0	0.0	0	0
2022	WAS	17	17	**64**	32	**32**	**11.5**	**1**	**18**	0	1	0	0	**5**	0	0	0.0	0	0
2023	WAS	17	17	53	32	21	4.0	0	13	2	**2**	0	0	4	0	0	0.0	0	0
2024	WAS	17	17	42	22	20	4.0	0	5	0	0	0	0	2	0	0	0.0	0	0
2025	WAS	15	15	46	20	26	3.0	**1**	7	1	0	0	0	**5**	0	0	0.0	0	0
2026	WAS	6	6	14	7	7	1.0	0	2	1	0	0	0	0	0	0	0.0	0	0
Career		136	130	446	242	204	38.0	2	67	8	6	15	0	25	1	0	0.0	0	0

==== Postseason ====
Year	Team	Games		Tackles						Fumbles				Interceptions					
Year	Team	GP	GS	Cmb	Solo	Ast	Sck	Sfty	TFL	FF	FR	Yds	TD	PD	Int	Yds	Avg	Lng	TD
2020	WAS	1	1	**5**	**2**	**3**	**2.0**	0	**2**	**1**	0	0	0	0	0	0	0.0	0	0
2024	WAS	**2**	**2**	1	1	0	0.0	0	0	0	0	0	0	0	0	0	0.0	0	0
Career		3	3	6	3	3	2.0	0	2	1	0	0	0	0	0	0	0.0	0	0

=== College ===
College statistics
Season	GP	Tackles					Interceptions					Fumbles		
Season	GP	Solo	Ast	Cmb	TfL	Sck	Int	Yds	Avg	TD	PD	FR	FF	TD
2015	8	6	7	13	0.5	0.5	0	0	0	0	1	0	1	0
2016	13	12	24	36	3.5	1.5	0	0	0	0	1	1	0	1
2017	14	21	32	53	1	1	1	21	21	0	3	1	0	0
Career	35	39	63	102	5	3	1	21	21	0	5	2	1	1
