= Rod West =

Australian rules footballer

Personal information
- Full name: Rod West
- Born: 13 August 1936
- Original team: North Geelong
- Height: 171 cm (5 ft 7 in)
- Weight: 71 kg (157 lb)

Playing career^{1}
Years	Club	Games (Goals)
1957	Geelong	3 (0)
- ^{1} Playing statistics correct to the end of 1957.

Rod West (born 13 August 1936) is a former Australian rules footballer who played with Geelong in the Victorian Football League (VFL).
