= 2022 Michigan Wolverines football team =

American college football season

2022 Michigan Wolverines football

Big Ten champion Big Ten East Division champion

Big Ten Championship Game, W 43–22 vs. Purdue

Fiesta Bowl (CFP Semifinal), L 45–51 vs. TCU
- Conference: Big Ten Conference
- East Division

Ranking
- Coaches: No. 3
- AP: No. 3
- Record: 13–1 (9–0 Big Ten)
- Head coach: Jim Harbaugh (8th season)
- Co-offensive coordinators: Sherrone Moore (2nd season); Matt Weiss (1st season)
- Offensive scheme: Pro spread
- Defensive coordinator: Jesse Minter (1st season)
- Co-defensive coordinator: Steve Clinkscale (1st season)
- Base defense: 4–2–5
- MVP: Blake Corum
- Captains: Ronnie Bell; Erick All; Cade McNamara; Mike Sainristil; Mazi Smith
- Home stadium: Michigan Stadium

Uniform
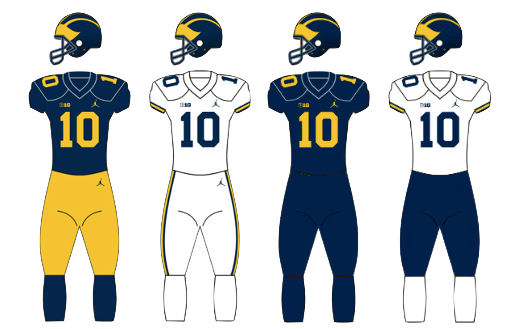

2022 Big Ten Conference football standings
	Conf.			Overall
Team	W		L	W		L
East Division
No. 3 Michigan xy$^	9	–	0	13	–	1
No. 4 Ohio State ^	8	–	1	11	–	2
No. 7 Penn State	7	–	2	11	–	2
Maryland	4	–	5	8	–	5
Indiana	2	–	7	4	–	8
Rutgers	1	–	8	4	–	8
Michigan State†	0	–	6	0	–	7
West Division
Purdue xy	6	–	3	8	–	6
Illinois	5	–	4	8	–	5
Iowa	5	–	4	8	–	5
Minnesota	5	–	4	9	–	4
Wisconsin	4	–	5	7	–	6
Nebraska	3	–	6	4	–	8
Northwestern	1	–	8	1	–	11
Championship: Michigan 43, Purdue 22
^ – College Football Playoff participant; $ – Conference champion; x – Division champion/co-champions; y – Championship game participant; † — NCAA vacated all wins for Michigan State (5–7, 3–6); Rankings from AP Poll

The 2022 Michigan Wolverines football team represented the University of Michigan in the East Division of the Big Ten Conference during the 2022 NCAA Division I FBS football season. The Wolverines were led by eighth-year head coach Jim Harbaugh and compiled an overall record of 12–0 (9–0 in the conference), winning the Big Ten East Division title for the second consecutive season. Michigan beat Purdue in the Big Ten Championship Game to repeat as conference champions. The Wolverines advanced to the College Football Playoff (CFP) for the second straight year, where they lost 51–45 to TCU in the Fiesta Bowl for the CFP semifinal on December 31.

Junior running back Blake Corum won the Big Ten Most Valuable Player and the Big Ten Running Back of the Year. Graduate transfer center Olu Oluwatimi won the Outland Trophy, as the nation's best interior lineman, and the Rimington Trophy, as the nation's best center. Senior defensive end Mike Morris was named the Big Ten Defensive Lineman of the Year and Harbaugh was recognized as the Hayes–Schembechler Coach of the Year by the conference. Corum was a unanimous All-American and Oluwatimi was a consensus selection on the 2022 College Football All-America Team. Michigan's offensive line was honored with the Joe Moore Award for second consecutive season.

Season highlights included:

- Sophomore J. J. McCarthy replaced senior Cade McNamara as the team's starting quarterback after the second game of the season against Hawaii.
- The Wolverines rushed for 418 yards, their highest single-game total since 2016, in a 41–17 victory over No. 10 Penn State.
- Corum rushed for 177 yards and a touchdown in a 29–7 victory over Michigan State. Eight Michigan State players were suspended after a post-game assault on two Michigan players.
- Fifth-year placekicker Jake Moody kicked a game-winning field goal with nine seconds remaining in a 19–17 victory over Illinois on Senior Day.
- The Wolverines had five explosive plays of 45 yards or more to defeat No. 2 Ohio State by a 45–23 score. It was Michigan's first victory at Ohio Stadium since 2000.
- Donovan Edwards rushed for 185 yards and a touchdown, receiving the most valuable player award in the Big Ten Championship Game as Michigan defeated Purdue

The team's statistical leaders were McCarthy with 2,719 passing yards, 22 touchdown passes, 5 interceptions, and a 64.6% completion percentage; Corum with 1,463 rushing yards and 18 touchdowns on 247 carries; and graduate wide receiver Ronnie Bell with 62 catches for 889 receiving yards. Moody converted 29 of 35 field goal attempts and 60 of 60 kicks for point after touchdown and led the team with 147 points scored, which broke the previous program record of 138 points scored, set by Desmond Howard during his Heisman Trophy-winning campaign in 1991. Moody also set program records for field goals in a season (29), career field goals (66), career points scored (355), and longest field goal (59 yards). Morris had a team-high 7.5 quarterback sacks. Sophomore linebacker Junior Colson paced the team with 101 tackles. Edwards rushed for 991 yards and 7 touchdowns on 140 carries, averaging 7.1 yards per rush, and had 18 receptions for 200 yards and 2 touchdowns through the air. Senior wide receiver Cornelius Johnson had a team-high six touchdown receptions.

== Schedule ==
Date	Time	Opponent	Rank	Site	TV	Result	Attendance	Source
September 3	12:00 p.m.	Colorado State*	No. 8	Michigan Stadium; Ann Arbor, MI	ABC	W 51–7	109,575	
September 10	8:00 p.m.	Hawaii*	No. 4	Michigan Stadium; Ann Arbor, MI	BTN	W 56–10	110,012	
September 17	12:00 p.m.	UConn*	No. 4	Michigan Stadium; Ann Arbor, MI	ABC	W 59–0	109,639	
September 24	12:00 p.m.	Maryland^{†}	No. 4	Michigan Stadium; Ann Arbor, MI (Big Noon Kickoff)	FOX	W 34–27	110,225	
October 1	12:00 p.m.	at Iowa	No. 4	Kinnick Stadium; Iowa City, IA (Big Noon Kickoff)	FOX	W 27–14	69,250	
October 8	12:00 p.m.	at Indiana	No. 4	Memorial Stadium; Bloomington, IN (Big Noon Kickoff)	FOX	W 31–10	50,805	
October 15	12:00 p.m.	No. 10 Penn State	No. 5	Michigan Stadium; Ann Arbor, MI (rivalry, Big Noon Kickoff)	FOX	W 41–17	110,812	
October 29	7:30 p.m.	Michigan State	No. 4	Michigan Stadium; Ann Arbor, MI (rivalry)	ABC	W 29–7	111,083	
November 5	7:30 p.m.	at Rutgers	No. 5	SHI Stadium; Piscataway, NJ	BTN	W 52–17	51,117	
November 12	3:30 p.m.	Nebraska	No. 3	Michigan Stadium; Ann Arbor, MI	ABC	W 34–3	110,192	
November 19	12:00 p.m.	Illinois	No. 3	Michigan Stadium; Ann Arbor, MI (rivalry)	ABC	W 19–17	110,433	
November 26	12:00 p.m.	at No. 2 Ohio State	No. 3	Ohio Stadium; Columbus, OH (rivalry, Big Noon Kickoff, College GameDay)	FOX	W 45–23	106,787	
December 3	8:00 p.m.	vs. Purdue*	No. 2	Lucas Oil Stadium; Indianapolis, IN (Big Ten Championship Game)	FOX	W 43–22	67,107	
December 31	4:00 p.m.	vs. No. 3 TCU*	No. 2	State Farm Stadium; Glendale, AZ (Fiesta Bowl–CFP Semifinal)	ESPN	L 45–51	71,723	
*Non-conference game; ^{†}Homecoming; Rankings from AP Poll (and CFP Rankings, after November 1); All times are in Eastern time

== Rankings ==
Ranking movements Legend: ██ Increase in ranking ██ Decrease in ranking ( ) = First-place votes
	Week															
Poll	Pre	1	2	3	4	5	6	7	8	9	10	11	12	13	14	Final
AP	8	4	4	4	4	4	5	4	4	4	3	3	3	2 (5)	2 (1)	3
Coaches	6	5	5	4	4	4	4	3 (1)	4 (1)	4	3 (2)	3 (1)	3 (2)	2 (3)	2 (2)	3
CFP	Not released									5	3	3	3	2	2	Not released

== Preseason ==
=== Coaching changes ===
Following the season, Michigan made a number of coaching changes.

- On January 5, it was reported that defensive line coach Shaun Nua would be leaving Michigan after 3 seasons to join Lincoln Riley's staff at USC in the same role. This was announced by USC on January 10.
- On January 17, Michigan announced the hire of Mike Elston as the new defensive line coach, replacing Nua. Elston, a former Michigan player from 1993 to 1996, had spent the past 12 seasons on the staff at Notre Dame, most recently serving as the program's assistant head coach and defensive line coach.
- On January 27, defensive coordinator Mike Macdonald left Michigan after one season to return to the Baltimore Ravens as their defensive coordinator.
- On February 6, reports surfaced that offensive coordinator Josh Gattis would leave Michigan after 3 seasons for the same role at Miami. Miami officially announced the hire on February 9.
- On February 9, Harbaugh and Michigan hired Jesse Minter to replace Macdonald as defensive coordinator. Minter had spent the 2021 season as the defensive coordinator at Vanderbilt and had spent 4 seasons previously with the Baltimore Ravens.
- Also on February 9, Michigan announced the hire of former Michigan player Grant Newsome as the program's tight ends coach, after previously spending two seasons as a graduate assistant with the program.
- Harbaugh also announced a reassignment of numerous staff roles on February 9. Offensive line coach Sherrone Moore and quarterbacks coach Matt Weiss were named co-offensive coordinators, replacing Gattis. Safeties coach Ron Bellamy transitioned into the role of wide receivers coach. Running backs coach Mike Hart added the title of run game coordinator. Tight ends coach Jay Harbaugh will switch to the defensive side of the ball and coach safeties.

== Game summaries ==
=== Colorado State ===
Colorado State at No. 8 Michigan

Team	1	2	3	4	Total
Rams	0	0	0	7	7
• No. 8 Wolverines	10	13	14	14	51

- Date: September 3
- Location: Michigan Stadium
  Ann Arbor, MI
- Game start: 12:07 p.m. EDT
- Elapsed time: 3:13
- Game attendance: 109,575
- Game weather: 84 °F (29 °C), sunny, SW 5 MPH
- Referee: Ron Hudson
- TV announcers (ABC): Mark Jones, Robert Griffin III, and Quint Kessenich

Scoring summary
1	9:49	MICH	Roman Wilson 61-yard pass from Cade McNamara (Jake Moody kick)	MICH 7–0
1	8:06	MICH	Jake Moody 31-yard field goal	MICH 10–0
2	14:48	MICH	Jake Moody 26-yard field goal	MICH 13–0
2	5:25	MICH	Blake Corum 7-yard run (Jake Moody kick)	MICH 20–0
2	0:11	MICH	Jake Moody 34-yard field goal	MICH 23–0
3	12:12	MICH	D. J. Turner 45-yard fumble return (Jake Moody kick)	MICH 30–0
3	6:08	MICH	J. J. McCarthy 20-yard run (Jake Moody kick)	MICH 37–0
4	14:12	MICH	Donovan Edwards 1-yard run (Jake Moody kick)	MICH 44–0
4	8:59	CSU	Tory Horton 34-yard pass from Clay Millen (Cayden Camper kick)	MICH 44–7
4	1:43	MICH	Alex Orji 4-yard run (Jake Moody kick)	MICH 51–7

The Wolverines opened their 2022 season on September 3 against the Colorado State Rams. Before a crowd of 109,575 at Michigan Stadium, the Wolverines defeated the Rams, 51–7.

On the opening drive of the game, Michigan failed to gain a first down and was forced to punt. On Michigan's second drive, quarterback Cade McNamara threw a bubble screen pass to Roman Wilson who caught the ball at the 36-yard line and ran 64 yards for the opening score. On the next Colorado State possession, Michigan safety Rod Moore intercepted a pass at midfield and returned it to the Colorado State 13-yard line. After taking over in the red zone, McNamara threw a pass that was initially ruled as an interception but that was ruled incomplete after an official review. Michigan settled for a 31-yard field goal by Jake Moody and led, 10–0, at the end of the first quarter.

In the second quarter, Michigan's fourth drive stalled at the eight-yard line, and Michigan again settled for a 26-yard field goal by Moody. After a quarterback sack, Michigan was forced to punt on its fifth possession. On its sixth possession, Michigan started with excellent field possession near midfield, and Blake Corum capped the drive with a seven-yard touchdown run. On Michigan's eighth possession of the first half, Michigan stalled at the 16-yard line, and for the third time in the half, settled for a field goal by Moody. Michigan led, 23–0, at halftime.

Colorado State took the second-half kickoff, and on fourth down, quarterback Clay Millen fumbled, and Michigan defensive back D. J. Turner recovered the loose ball and returned it 45 yards for a touchdown. On Michigan's first offensive possession of the second half, McNamara began the drive at quarterback, but J. J. McCarthy took over near midfield. With McCarthy in charge of the offense, freshman running back C. J. Stokes gained 19 yards on his first collegiate carry, and McCarthy then ran the remaining 20 yards for a touchdown. Michigan led, 37–0, at the end of the third quarter.

Michigan's first full drive with McCarthy at quarterback began at the Michigan 42-yard line. McCarthy carried the ball twice for gains of 19 and 12 yards. The drive concluded with a one-yard touchdown run early in the fourth quarter by Donovan Edwards. Colorado State responded with its only successful drive, scoring on a 34-yard touchdown pass from Millen to Tory Horton with 8:59 remaining in the game. Following the Colorado State touchdown, Alan Bowman took over at quarterback for Michigan, completing five of six passes. Bowman then gave way to fourth-string quarterback Alex Orji who ran four yards for Michigan's final touchdown with 1:41 remaining.

On defense, Michigan had seven quarterback sacks and 11 tackles for loss. The defense held Colorado State to 137 passing yards and 82 rushing yards. On offense, Michigan tallied 206 passing yards and 234 rushing yards. Cade McNamara completed nine of eighteen passes for 136 yards and one touchdown and had a quarterback rating of 39.7. McCarthy completed four of four attempts for 30 yards and a quarterback rating of 99.9. Blake Corum gained 76 rushing yards and a touchdown on 13 carries, and Donovan Edwards gained 64 yards and a touchdown on 12 carries.

Michigan's honorary captains for the game were CBS Sports analysts and Michigan alumni Dana Jacobson and Tracy Wolfson.

Statistics	CSU	No. 8 UM
First downs	14	25
Plays–yards	59–219	68–440
Rushes–yards	39–82	40–234
Passing yards	137	206
Passing: comp–att–int	16–20–1	18–28–0
Turnovers		
Time of possession	29:30	30:30

Team	Category	Player	Statistics
Colorado St.	Passing	Clay Millen	16/20, 137 yards, 1 TD, 1 INT
Colorado St.	Rushing	A'Jon Vivens	10 carries, 35 yards
Colorado St.	Receiving	Tory Horton	6 receptions, 69 yards, 1 TD
No. 8 Michigan	Passing	Cade McNamara	9/18, 136 yards, 1 TD
No. 8 Michigan	Rushing	Blake Corum	13 carries, 76 yards, 1 TD
No. 8 Michigan	Receiving	Roman Wilson	2 receptions, 65 yards, 1 TD

=== Hawaii ===
Hawaii at No. 4 Michigan

Team	1	2	3	4	Total
Rainbow Warriors	0	0	3	7	10
• No. 4 Wolverines	21	21	0	14	56

- Date: September 10
- Location: Michigan Stadium
  Ann Arbor, MI
- Game start: 9:01 p.m. EDT
- Elapsed time: 3:17
- Game attendance: 110,012
- Game weather: 73 °F (23 °C), rain, SE 7 MPH
- Referee: Larry Smith
- TV announcers (BTN): Lisa Byington, Jake Butt, and Meghan McKeown

Scoring summary
1	12:48	MICH	Roman Wilson 42-yard pass from J. J. McCarthy (Jake Moody kick)	MICH 7–0
1	7:36	MICH	Blake Corum 1-yard run (Jake Moody kick)	MICH 14–0
1	4:23	MICH	Roman Wilson 21-yard run (Jake Moody kick)	MICH 21–0
2	12:05	MICH	Ronnie Bell 13-yard pass from J. J. McCarthy (Jake Moody kick)	MICH 28–0
2	8:38	MICH	Donovan Edwards 1-yard run (Jake Moody kick)	MICH 35–0
2	1:06	MICH	Cornelius Johnson 17-yard pass from J. J. McCarthy (Jake Moody kick)	MICH 42–0
3	3:51	UH	Matthew Shipley 26-yard field goal	MICH 42–3
4	14:54	MICH	C. J. Stokes 15-yard run (Rhett Andersen kick)	MICH 49–3
4	11:27	UH	Tylan Hines 54-yard run (Matthew Shipley kick)	MICH 49–10
4	7:59	MICH	Isaiah Gash 36-yard run (Tommy Doman kick)	MICH 56–10

On September 10, Michigan hosted Hawaii before a crowd of 110,012 at Michigan Stadium. The game was delayed by an hour due to a passing thunderstorm. The 9:01 p.m. kickoff was the latest in Michigan Stadium history. Due to the weather delay, the tradition of running under the M Club banner was not followed for the first time in some 60 years.

Michigan won the game, 56–10. The game was the first start for quarterback J. J. McCarthy. On their opening possession, the Wolverines drove 66 yards in 36 seconds on a 24-yard run by Blake Corum and a 42-yard touchdown pass from McCarthy to Roman Wilson. On their second possession, the Wolverines scored on a 77-yard drive that featured a 31-yard pass from McCarthy to Ronnie Bell and five runs by Corum, including a one-yard touchdown run. Michigan began its third possession in Hawaii territory after A. J. Henning returned a punt 35 yards to the 43-yard line. The Wolverines drove 43 yards on three plays, capped by Roman Wilson's second touchdown of the quarter on a 21-yard run. Michigan led, 21–0, at the end of the first quarter.

In the second quarter, running back Donovan Edwards led a three-play, 59-yard touchdown drive. Edwards began the drive with a 25-yard run and then lined up wide to the right, covered by a linebacker, and caught a 33-yard pass at the Hawaii one-yard line. Edwards then ran one yard for the touchdown. On Michigan's next drive, Cade McNamara entered the game, and the drive stalled near midfield when McNamara was sacked – Hawaii's first sack of the season. McCarthy returned to the game for the final drive of the half with 2:06 remaining. McCarthy led a four-play, 52-yard drive, ending with a 17-yard touchdown pass to Cornelius Johnson. Michigan led, 42–0, at halftime.

In the third quarter, Michigan failed to score on three drives with McNamara at quarterback. Two drives ended in punts, and the third ended with Virdel Edwards II intercepting a pass. Hawaii scored the only points of the third quarter on a 26-yard field goal by Matthew Shipley.

Late in the third quarter, freshman Davis Warren entered the game as Michigan's quarterback. Warren led a 91-yard touchdown drive capped by a 15-yard touchdown run by C. J. Stokes. Hawaii responded with a 54-yard touchdown run by Tylan Hines. Warren then led the Wolverines on a 65-yard drive, concluding with a 38-yard touchdown run by Isaiah Gash.

McCarthy completed 11 of 12 passes for 229 yards and three touchdowns with a quarterback rating of 99.2. Warren compiled a quarterback rating of 96.6 in his first game for Michigan. McNamara compiled a career-low quarterback rating of 1.8. On the ground, five Michigan players scored rushing touchdowns. Corum led the way with 88 rushing yards on nine carries. Stokes contributed 61 yards on eight carries, and Gash added 48 yards on three carries. The coaching staff reached deep into the roster in the second half, giving 96 players an opportunity to participate for at least one play.

Michigan scored 42 points in the first-half, the most points since scoring 43 points in the first-half against Rutgers in 2016. Michigan's offense recorded 410 total yards in the first-half, the fifth most total yards in a half in program history.

Statistics	UH	No. 4 UM
First downs	13	23
Plays–yards	69–253	55–588
Rushes–yards	32–140	33–268
Passing yards	113	320
Passing: comp–att–int	13–37–0	17–22–1
Turnovers		
Time of possession	32:40	27:20

Team	Category	Player	Statistics
Hawaii	Passing	Joey Yellen	13/36, 113 yards
Hawaii	Rushing	Tylan Hines	8 carries, 75 yards, 1 TD
Hawaii	Receiving	James Phillips	3 receptions, 33 yards
No. 4 Michigan	Passing	J. J. McCarthy	11/12, 229 yards, 3 TD
No. 4 Michigan	Rushing	Blake Corum	9 carries, 88 yards, 1 TD
No. 4 Michigan	Receiving	Ronnie Bell	6 receptions, 76 yards, 1 TD

=== UConn ===
Connecticut at No. 4 Michigan

Team	1	2	3	4	Total
Huskies	0	0	0	0	0
• No. 4 Wolverines	17	21	7	14	59

- Date: September 17
- Location: Michigan Stadium
  Ann Arbor, MI
- Game start: 12:07 p.m. EDT
- Elapsed time: 3:19
- Game attendance: 109,639
- Game weather: 75 °F (24 °C), sunny, SW 8 MPH
- Referee: Tom Stapleton
- TV announcers (ABC): Bob Wischusen, Roddy Jones, and Kris Budden

Scoring summary
1	12:52	MICH	Blake Corum 20-yard run (Jake Moody kick)	MICH 7–0
1	2:52	MICH	Blake Corum 1-yard run (Jake Moody kick)	MICH 14–0
1	0:38	MICH	Jake Moody 26-yard field goal	MICH 17–0
2	12:08	MICH	Blake Corum 1-yard run (Jake Moody kick)	MICH 24–0
2	6:05	MICH	A. J. Henning 61-yard punt return (Jake Moody kick)	MICH 31–0
2	3:11	MICH	Blake Corum 1-yard run (Jake Moody kick)	MICH 38–0
3	4:36	MICH	Blake Corum 1-yard run (Jake Moody kick)	MICH 45–0
4	12:44	MICH	Alex Orji 10-yard run (Jake Moody kick)	MICH 52–0
4	7:54	MICH	Leon Franklin 20-yard pass from Alan Bowman (Tommy Doman kick)	MICH 59–0

On September 17, Michigan played its final non-conference game, defeating UConn, 59–0, before a crowd of 109,639 at Michigan Stadium.

On the game's opening drive, Michigan drove 72 yards on four plays including a screen pass from J. J. McCarthy to Roman Wilson covering 38 yards and a 20-yard touchdown run by Blake Corum. Michigan's second drive resulted in a three-and-out. On their third possession, the Wolverines drove 54 yards on four plays, concluding with Corum's second touchdown on a one-yard run. After a fumble by UConn running back ictor Rosa, Michigan's fourth drive started at the Huskies' 25-yard line. Michigan advanced to the seven-yard line but settled for a 26-yard field goal by Jake Moody. The Wolverines led, 17–0, at the end of the first quarter.

Early in the second quarter, Michigan took over at the UConn 18-yard line after Caden Kolesar blocked a punt. Corum scored his third touchdown on a one-yard run. Michigan extended the lead with a 61-yard punt return for a touchdown. Later in the second quarter, Michigan drove 60 yards on three plays, including a 28-yard pass from McCarthy to Ronnie Bell, a 31-yard pass from McCarthy to Luke Schoonmaker, and a one-yard touchdown run by Corum (his fourth). On Michigan's final possession of the half, Cade McNamara entered the game at quarterback and sustained an injury after being tackled behind the line of scrimmage. With 24 seconds left in the half, Moody attempted a 62-yard field goal that fell short. Michigan led, 38–0, at halftime.

On Michigan's first drive of the second half, McCarthy led the team 83 yards on 11 plays, including a 17-yard pass to Roman Wilson and Corum's fifth touchdown on an 11-yard run. Michigan led, 45–0, at the end of the third quarter.

On Michigan's next drive, Davis Warren began the drive at quarterback and then gave way to Alex Orji. The team drove 66 yards on 11 plays, ending with a 10-yard run by Orji. Michigan's final touchdown drive covered 30 yards with Andy Maddox and then Alan Bowman at quarterback; the drive concluded with a 30-yard touchdown pass from Bowman to Leon Franklin.

Michigan had seven quarterbacks complete a pass in the game. McCarthy completed 15 of 18 passes for 214 yards. Corum tallied 71 rushing yards on 12 carries. Corum tied Michigan's modern-era record with five rushing touchdowns in a game. He became the first Michigan player to score four first-half touchdowns in a game since Ed Shuttlesworth in 1972.

Michigan won its third consecutive game to start the season by a margin of 40-plus points for the first time since 1991. Its 59-point margin of victory was the fifth highest for a Michigan team in the modern era.

Statistics	UCONN	No. 4 UM
First downs	6	26
Plays–yards	53–110	69–465
Rushes–yards	33–86	43–192
Passing yards	24	273
Passing: comp–att–int	5–20–0	21–26–0
Turnovers		
Time of possession	25:53	34:07

Team	Category	Player	Statistics
UConn	Passing	Zion Turner	4/16, 17 yards
UConn	Rushing	Zion Turner	7 carries, 42 yards
UConn	Receiving	Nate Carter	1 reception, 9 yards
No. 4 Michigan	Passing	J. J. McCarthy	15/18, 214 yards
No. 4 Michigan	Rushing	Blake Corum	12 carries, 71 yards, 5 TD
No. 4 Michigan	Receiving	Ronnie Bell	7 receptions, 96 yards

=== Maryland ===
Maryland at No. 4 Michigan
(Homecoming game)

Team	1	2	3	4	Total
Terrapins	10	3	0	14	27
• No. 4 Wolverines	10	7	0	17	34

- Date: September 24
- Location: Michigan Stadium
  Ann Arbor, MI
- Game start: 12:12 p.m. EST
- Elapsed time: 3:16
- Game attendance: 110,225
- Game weather: 61 °F (16 °C), cloudy, S 5 MPH
- Referee: Greg Blum
- TV announcers (FOX): Gus Johnson, Joel Klatt, and Jenny Taft

Scoring summary
1	14:52	MICH	Luke Schoonmaker 10-yard pass from J. J. McCarthy (Jake Moody kick)	MICH 7–0
1	12:25	UMD	Chad Ryland 53-yard field goal	MICH 7–3
1	8:10	MICH	Jake Moody 52-yard field goal	MICH 10–3
1	2:22	UMD	Antwain Littleton II 2-yard run (Chad Ryland kick)	Tied 10–10
2	13:15	UMD	Chad Ryland 52-yard field goal	UMD 13–10
2	0:22	MICH	Blake Corum 33-yard run (Jake Moody kick)	MICH 17–13
4	14:16	MICH	Roman Wilson 20-yard pass from J. J. McCarthy (Jake Moody kick)	MICH 24–13
4	9:10	UMD	Tai Felton 4-yard pass from Taulia Tagovailoa	MICH 24–19
4	6:28	MICH	Jake Moody 38-yard field goal	MICH 27–19
2	3:31	MICH	Blake Corum 47-yard run (Jake Moody kick)	MICH 34–19
4	0:45	UMD	CJ Dippre 18-yard pass from Billy Edwards Jr. (Jeshaun Jones pass)	MICH 34–27

On September 24, Michigan defeated Maryland, 34–27, before a homecoming crowd of 110,225 at Michigan Stadium.

After Maryland fumbled the opening kickoff, Michigan took possession at Maryland's 10-yard line and scored on the first play from scrimmage, a 10-yard touchdown pass from J. J. McCarthy to Luke Schoonmaker. Maryland then drove 40 yards on 10 plays, settling for a 53-yard field goal by Chad Ryland. Michigan then drove 41 yards on 10 plays, also settling for a field goal of 52 yards by Jake Moody. Maryland then drove 75 yards on 13 plays, concluding with a two-yard touchdown run by Antwain Littleton. Michigan's third drive ended with a fumble by C. J. Stokes at Maryland's 27-yard line. The score was tied, 10–10, at the end of the first quarter.

Early in the second quarter, Maryland took a 13–10 lead on a 52-yard field goal by Chad Ryland. Later in the quarter, Moody missed on a 43-yard field goal attempt. With 1:14 left in the half, Michigan drove 70 yards on eight plays, ending with a 33-yard touchdown run by Blake Corum. Michigan led, 17–13, at halftime.

Neither team scored in the third quarter, as each team was forced to punt two times.

The teams combined for 31 points in a high-scoring fourth quarter. Late in the third and early in the fourth quarter, Michigan drove 84 yards in 10 plays, ending with a 20-yard touchdown pass from McCarthy to Roman Wilson. Maryland responded with a 75-yard drive, concluding with a four-yard touchdown pass from Taulia Tagovailoa to Tai Felton. Michigan then added a 38-yard field goal by Moody. After R.J. Moten intercepted a Tagovailoa pass, Michigan drove 65 yards, including a 47-yard touchdown run by Corum. On its final possession, Maryland drove 75 yards and scored on an 18-yard pass from Billy Edwards Jr. to CJ Dippre.

Blake Corum rushed for a career-high 243 yards and two touchdowns on 30 carries. His 243 rushing yards was the most for a Michigan player since Denard Robinson rushed for 258 yards in 2010. He leads the Wolverines all-time with 6.47 career yards per attempt, passing Jon Vaughn (6.29, 1989–90).

J. J. McCarthy completed 18 of 26 passes for 220 yards, two touchdowns, and zero interceptions. Tight end Luke Schoonmaker caught a career-high seven passes for 72 yards and a touchdown.

Statistics	UMD	No. 4 UM
First downs	23	22
Plays–yards	73–397	66–463
Rushes–yards	34–128	40–243
Passing yards	269	220
Passing: comp–att–int	25–39–2	18–26–0
Turnovers		
Time of possession	28:10	31:50

Team	Category	Player	Statistics
Maryland	Passing	Taulia Tagovailoa	20/30, 207 yards, 1 TD, 2 INT
Maryland	Rushing	Roman Hemby	16 carries, 48 yards
Maryland	Receiving	Corey Dyches	3 receptions, 60 yards
No. 4 Michigan	Passing	J. J. McCarthy	18/26, 220 yards, 2 TD
No. 4 Michigan	Rushing	Blake Corum	30 carries, 243 yards, 2 TD
No. 4 Michigan	Receiving	Luke Schoonmaker	7 receptions, 72 yards, 1 TD

=== At Iowa ===
No. 4 Michigan at Iowa

Team	1	2	3	4	Total
• No. 4 Wolverines	7	6	7	7	27
Hawkeyes	0	0	0	14	14

- Date: October 1
- Location: Kinnick Stadium
  Iowa City, IA
- Game start: 11:05 a.m. CDT
- Elapsed time: 3:09
- Game attendance: 69,250
- Game weather: 65 °F (18 °C), sunny, NE 6 MPH
- Referee: Mark Kluczynski
- TV announcers (FOX): Gus Johnson, Joel Klatt, and Jenny Taft

Scoring summary
1	9:53	MICH	Ronnie Bell 16-yard run (Jake Moody kick)	MICH 7–0
2	8:28	MICH	Jake Moody 44-yard field goal	MICH 10–0
2	0:09	MICH	Jake Moody 35-yard field goal	MICH 13–0
3	7:51	MICH	Donovan Edwards 12-yard pass from J. J. McCarthy (Jake Moody kick)	MICH 20–0
4	14:56	IOWA	Kaleb Johnson 2-yard run (Drew Stevens kick)	MICH 20–7
4	1:19	MICH	Blake Corum 20-yard run (Jake Moody kick)	MICH 27–7
4	0:08	IOWA	Luke Lachey 5-yard pass from Spencer Petras (Drew Stevens kick)	MICH 27–14

On October 1, in a rematch of the 2021 Big Ten Football Championship Game, Michigan defeated Iowa, 27–14, before a crowd of 69,250 at Kinnick Stadium in Iowa City, Iowa. The win was Michigan's first in Iowa City since a 23–20 overtime victory in 2005. In response to the pink paint in Kinnick Stadium's visitors locker room, the Wolverines embraced the color and waved bright pink towels on the sideline before the game started.

On the opening drive of the game, Michigan drove 75 yards on 11 plays, concluding with a 16-yard touchdown run by Ronnie Bell. Iowa and Michigan traded punts on the next three drives.

At the start of the second quarter, Michigan drove 54 yards, and Jake Moody kicked a 44-yard field goal. After forcing a third Iowa punt, Michigan drove 61 yards, and Moody kicked a 35-yard field goal. Michigan led, 13–0, at halftime.

Iowa took the second-half kickoff and was held to negative yardage and a three-and-out. Michigan then drove 67 yards on 10 plays, J. J. McCarthy passing for 12 yards to Donovan Edwards for a touchdown. The teams traded punts on the next two drives, and Michigan led, 20–0, at the end of third quarter.

On the first play of the fourth quarter, Iowa scored on a two-yard touchdown run by Kaleb Johnson, capping a seven-play, 44-yard drive. Iowa was held on downs on its next to drives, and Michigan punted on consecutive three-and-outs. With 2:10 remaining in the game, Michigan took over on downs at the Iowa 28-yard line. Blake Corum ran three times, scoring on a 20-yard run. With 1:11 remaining in the game, Spencer Petras led the Hawkeyes on a five-play, 75-yard drive. Petras threw a five-yard touchdown pass to Luke Lachey with eight seconds remaining in the game.

McCarthy completed 18 of 24 passes for 155 yards and a touchdown. Corum rushed for 133 yards and a touchdown. Tight end Luke Schoonmaker led Michigan's receivers with four catches for 45 yards. On defense, Michigan held Iowa to 35 rushing yards. Petras completed 21 of 31 passes for 246 yards and a touchdown.

Statistics	No. 4 UM	IOWA
First downs	24	16
Plays–yards	66–327	55–281
Rushes–yards	42–172	24–35
Passing yards	155	246
Passing: comp–att–int	18–24–0	21–31–0
Turnovers		
Time of possession	33:44	26:16

Team	Category	Player	Statistics
No. 4 Michigan	Passing	J. J. McCarthy	18/24, 155 yards, 1 TD
No. 4 Michigan	Rushing	Blake Corum	29 carries, 133 yards, 1 TD
No. 4 Michigan	Receiving	Luke Schoonmaker	4 receptions, 45 yards
Iowa	Passing	Spencer Petras	21/31, 246 yards, 1 TD
Iowa	Rushing	Leshon Williams	8 carries, 34 yards
Iowa	Receiving	Luke Lachey	4 receptions, 84 yards, 1 TD

=== At Indiana ===
No. 4 Michigan at Indiana

Team	1	2	3	4	Total
• No. 4 Wolverines	10	0	7	14	31
Hoosiers	7	3	0	0	10

- Date: October 8
- Location: Memorial Stadium
  Bloomington, IN
- Game start: 12:06 p.m. EDT
- Elapsed time: 3:37
- Game attendance: 50,805
- Game weather: 50 °F (10 °C), sunny, N 4 MPH
- Referee: Jerry McGinn
- TV announcers (FOX): Gus Johnson, Joel Klatt, and Jenny Taft

Scoring summary
1	12:32	MICH	Blake Corum 1-yard run (Jake Moody kick)	MICH 7–0
1	4:54	IND	Josh Henderson 11-yard pass from Connor Bazelak (Charles Campbell kick)	Tied 7–7
1	1:02	MICH	Jake Moody 44-yard field goal	MICH 10–7
2	12:08	IND	Charles Campbell 41-yard field goal	Tied 10–10
3	7:39	MICH	Cornelius Johnson 29-yard pass from J. J. McCarthy (Jake Moody kick)	MICH 17–10
4	9:43	MICH	Luke Schoonmaker 9-yard pass from J. J. McCarthy (Jake Moody kick)	MICH 24–10
4	2:54	MICH	Cornelius Johnson 6-yard pass from J. J. McCarthy (Jake Moody kick)	MICH 31–10

On October 8, Michigan defeated Indiana, 31–10, before a crowd of 50,805 at Memorial Stadium in Bloomington, Indiana.

On the opening drive of the game, Blake Corum ran 50 yards to the one-yard line and then scored on a one-yard touchdown. This marked the fifth time in six games that Michigan scored on its first possession of the game. After an exchange of punts, Indiana drove 76 yards and tied the game on an 11-yard touchdown pass from Connor Bazelak to Josh Henderson. Michigan responded with a 49-yard drive ending with a 44-yard field goal by Jake Moody. Michigan led, 10–7, at the end of the first quarter.

Late in the first and early in the second quarter, Indiana drove 52 yards on 12 plays, tying the score on a 41-yard field goal by Charles Campbell. Late in the second quarter, the teams blocked field goals on consecutive possessions, with Indiana blocking a Jake Moody attempt at a 26-yarder and Michigan's Mike Morris blocking a 24-yard attempt by Charles Campbell. An Indiana touchdown was taken off the board due to an illegal block prior to Indiana's attempted field goal. The score was tied, 10–10, at halftime.

On its first possession of the second half, Michigan drove 98 yards on 11 plays, concluding with a 29-yard touchdown pass from J. J. McCarthy to Cornelius Johnson. Late in the third quarter, McCarthy was intercepted by Devon Matthews in the end zone for a touchback. Michigan led, 17–10, at the end of the third quarter.

In the fourth quarter, Michigan drove 56 yards, scoring on a nine-yard touchdown pass from McCarthy to Luke Schoonmaker. Michigan next drove 60 yards, scoring on a six-yard touchdown pass from McCarthy to Johnson.

Michigan's defense forced Indiana to punt on its first five possessions of the second half before forcing a turnover on downs with under two minutes to play. They also forced 10 tackles-for-loss, seven sacks and held Indiana to 29 yards in the second half. Corum finished with 124 yards rushing on 25 carries, his third consecutive 100-yard rushing game. McCarthy set career-best marks in pass attempts (28), completions (36) and passing yards (304), his first 300-yard game as a Wolverine. McCarthy threw his first career interception, ending a streak of 129 consecutive pass attempts without an interception.

Statistics	No. 4 UM	IU
First downs	26	21
Plays–yards	76–469	74–222
Rushes–yards	40–165	25–19
Passing yards	304	203
Passing: comp–att–int	28–36–1	25–49–1
Turnovers		
Time of possession	37:53	22:07

Team	Category	Player	Statistics
No. 4 Michigan	Passing	J. J. McCarthy	28/36, 304 yards, 3 TD, 1 INT
No. 4 Michigan	Rushing	Blake Corum	25 carries, 124 yards, 1 TD
No. 4 Michigan	Receiving	Ronnie Bell	11 receptions, 121 yards
Indiana	Passing	Connor Bazelak	25/49, 203 yards, 1 TD, 1 INT
Indiana	Rushing	Jaylin Lucas	4 carries, 45 yards
Indiana	Receiving	Emery Simmons	7 receptions, 57 yards

=== No. 10 Penn State ===
No. 10 Penn State at No. 5 Michigan

Team	1	2	3	4	Total
No. 10 Nittany Lions	0	14	3	0	17
• No. 5 Wolverines	6	10	15	10	41

- Date: October 15
- Location: Michigan Stadium
  Ann Arbor, MI
- Game start: 12:10 p.m. EDT
- Elapsed time: 3:24
- Game attendance: 110,812
- Game weather: 45 °F (7 °C), sunny, W 15 MPH
- Referee: Ron Snodgrass
- TV announcers (FOX): Gus Johnson, Joel Klatt and Jenny Taft

Scoring summary
1	9:46	MICH	Jake Moody 29-yard field goal	MICH 3–0
1	1:25	MICH	Jake Moody 24-yard field goal	MICH 6–0
2	8:29	MICH	Blake Corum 1-yard run (Jake Moody kick)	MICH 13–0
2	6:11	PSU	Kaytron Allen 1-yard run (Jake Pinegar kick)	MICH 13–7
2	4:22	PSU	Curtis Jacobs 47-yard interception return (Jake Pinegar kick)	PSU 14–13
2	0:02	MICH	Jake Moody 23-yard field goal	MICH 16–14
3	13:15	PSU	Jake Pinegar 27-yard field goal	PSU 17–16
3	11:12	MICH	Donovan Edwards 67-yard run (J. J. McCarthy–Ronnie Bell pass)	MICH 24–17
3	7:23	MICH	Blake Corum 61-yard run (Jake Moody kick)	MICH 31–17
4	11:00	MICH	Jake Moody 37-yard field goal	MICH 34–17
4	5:03	MICH	Donovan Edwards 3-yard run (Jake Moody kick)	MICH 41–17

On October 16, No. 5 Michigan defeated No. 10 Penn State, 41–17, before a crowd of 110,812 at Michigan Stadium.

On the opening drive of the game, Michigan drove 64 yards to the Penn State 11-yard line, and Jake Moody kicked a 29-yard field goal. After holding Penn State to a three-and-out, Michigan drove 77 yards on its second drive, including a 35-yard gain on a pass from J. J. McCarthy to Cornelius Johnson. Michigan settled for its second field goal, a 24-yarder by Moody. Michigan's defense again held Penn State to a three-and-out on the Nittany Lions' second possession to conclude the first quarter.

On its third possession, Michigan drove 70 yards, ending with a one-yard touchdown run by Blake Corum. On Penn State's third possession, Sean Clifford faked a handoff, kept the ball, and ran 62 yards to the Michigan four-yard line. Kaytron Allen then ran one yard for Penn State's first and only offensive touchdown of the game. On Michigan's fourth possession, Curtis Jacobs intercepted a McCarthy pass and returned it 47 yards for Penn State's second touchdown in a span of less than two minutes. On their fifth possession, the Wolverines drove 60 yards, and Moody kicked a 23-yard field goal with two seconds remaining in the half. Michigan led, 16–14, at halftime.

On the opening drive of the second half, Penn State drove 70 yards, including a pass from Clifford to Harrison Wallace III for 48 yards. The Nittany Lions retook the lead as Jake Pinegar kicked a 27-yard field goal. On its first possession of the second half, Michigan drove 81 yards, including a 67-yard touchdown run by Donovan Edwards. McCarthy completed a pass to Ronnie Bell for a two-point conversion. After holding Penn State on downs, Corum ran 61 yards for a touchdown on Michigan's second drive of the second half.

In the fourth quarter, Michigan added 10 points on a 37-yard field goal by Moody and a three-yard touchdown run by Edwards.

Michigan tallied 418 rushing yards in the game, the highest single-game rushing total for Michigan since 2016. Edwards led the way with a career-high 173 yards and two touchdowns, and Corum tallied 166 yards and two touchdowns. McCarthy completed 17 of 24 passes for 145 yards and an interception. Johnson led Michigan's receivers with 43 receiving yards on three receptions. Playing in his 53rd game for the Wolverines (ranking second in Michigan history), Moody converted all four of his field goal attempts. Michigan did not punt in the game. The Wolverines dominated time of possession, holding the ball for 41:56 to 18:04 for Penn State.

On defense, Michigan limited Penn State to 111 rushing yards, of which 62 yards came on Clifford's 62-yard sprint in the second quarter. Clifford and freshman Drew Allar combined for 157 passing yards for Penn State.

During the game, Michigan celebrated the 25th anniversary of the 1997 national championship team and dedicated the Michigan Stadium tunnel as the "Lloyd Carr Michigan Stadium Tunnel." Aidan Hutchinson was also presented with the Lott Trophy for 2022. Swimmer Michael Phelps and U.S. representative Fred Upton were honorary captains for Michigan.

Statistics	No. 10 PSU	No. 5 UM
First downs	10	28
Plays–yards	51–268	79–563
Rushes–yards	22–111	55–418
Passing yards	157	145
Passing: comp–att–int	12–29–0	17–24–1
Turnovers		
Time of possession	18:04	41:56

Team	Category	Player	Statistics
No. 10 Penn State	Passing	Sean Clifford	7/19, 120 yards
No. 10 Penn State	Rushing	Sean Clifford	6 carries, 74 yards
No. 10 Penn State	Receiving	Mitchell Tinsley	5 receptions, 57 yards
No. 5 Michigan	Passing	J. J. McCarthy	17/24, 145 yards, 1 INT
No. 5 Michigan	Rushing	Donovan Edwards	16 carries, 173 yards, 2 TD
No. 5 Michigan	Receiving	Cornelius Johnson	3 receptions, 43 yards

=== Michigan State ===
Michigan State at No. 4 Michigan
(Paul Bunyan Trophy)

Team	1	2	3	4	Total
Spartans	7	0	0	0	7
• No. 4 Wolverines	3	10	6	10	29

- Date: October 29
- Location: Michigan Stadium
  Ann Arbor, MI
- Game start: 7:44 p.m. EDT
- Elapsed time: 3:18
- Game attendance: 111,083
- Game weather: 50 °F (10 °C), clear, E 5 MPH
- Referee: Reggie Smith
- TV announcers (ABC): Sean McDonough, Todd Blackledge, and Molly McGrath

Scoring summary
1	2:20	MICH	Jake Moody 22-yard field goal	MICH 3–0
1	0:23	MSU	Payton Thorne 26-yard pass to Keon Coleman (Ben Patton kick)	MSU 7–3
2	11:58	MICH	J. J. McCarthy 2-yard pass to Blake Corum (Jake Moody kick)	MICH 10–7
2	1:08	MICH	Jake Moody 25-yard field goal	MICH 13–7
3	9:15	MICH	Jake Moody 39-yard field goal	MICH 16–7
3	3:58	MICH	Jake Moody 33-yard field goal	MICH 19–7
4	14:45	MICH	Jake Moody 54-yard field goal	MICH 22–7
4	5:03	MICH	Blake Corum 4-yard run (Jake Moody kick)	MICH 29–7

On October 29, after a bye week, No. 4 Michigan defeated rival Michigan State, 29–7, in a night game at Michigan Stadium. The Wolverines regained custody of the Paul Bunyan Trophy, ending the Spartans' two-game winning streak in the rivalry.

On the opening drive, Michigan State advanced the ball 29 yards on its first three plays, but penalties for unsportsmanlike conduct and false start stopped the drive. On Michigan's first possession, the Wolverines drove 33 yards, but Cornelius Johnson fumbled and the loose ball was recovered for the Spartans by Dashaun Mallory. Michigan State was then stopped on a fourth-and-one play, and the Wolverines took over at their own 46-yard line. Michigan then drove 41 yards on eight plays, including a 28-yard gain on a pass from J. J. McCarthy to Donovan Edwards. The drive stalled at the five-yard line, and Jake Moody kicked a 22-yard field goal. The Spartans responded with a six-play, 75-yard drive, capped by a 26-yard touchdown pass from Payton Thorne to Keon Coleman. Michigan State led, 7–3, at the end of the first quarter.

Early in the second quarter, Michigan retook the lead with an 80-yard drive, ending with a two-yard touchdown pass from McCarthy to Blake Corum. The Spartans responded with a 68-yard drive, including two long completions from Thorne to Coleman, but Michigan's defense held on a fourth-and-one play at Michigan's five-yard line. Michigan then had an 86-yard, 15-play drive that consumed six minutes and 23 seconds, ending with a 25-yard field goal by Moody. Michigan led, 13–7, at halftime.

Michigan took the kickoff to start the second half and drove 57 yards, settling for a career-long 54-yard field goal by Moody. After holding the Spartans to a three-and-out, the Wolverines drove 54 yards and settled for Moody's fourth field goal, a 33-yarder.

Early in the fourth quarter, Michigan's defense held, and the Spartans' long snap was too high for the punter to handle. Michigan took over at the Spartans' eight-yard line and scored on a four-yard touchdown run by Corum. Michigan's defense then held the Spartans to eight yards and a punt.

Corum led the team on offense with 177 rushing yards on 33 carries, his fifth consecutive 100-yard rushing game; he had two touchdowns, one rushing and one receiving. McCarthy completed 15 of 25 passes for 167 yards and a touchdown. Luke Schoonmaker led the receiving corps with five receptions for 70 yards. Jake Moody was successful on all five field goal attempts and accounted for 17 of Michigan's 29 points. Michigan's only punt of the game came with 5:52 remaining in the fourth quarter.

On defense, the Wolverines held the Spartans to 37 rushing yards, and forced the Spartans into three consecutive three-and-outs to begin the second half and allowed just three Spartans first downs in the entire second half. Coleman caught five passes for 155 yards and a touchdown for the Spartans. Today's game marked the 600th in the history of Michigan Stadium.

Statistics	MSU	No. 4 UM
First downs	11	27
Plays–yards	53–252	78–443
Rushes–yards	23–37	52–276
Passing yards	215	167
Passing: comp–att–int	17–30–1	15–26–0
Turnovers		
Time of possession	19:27	40:33

Team	Category	Player	Statistics
Michigan State	Passing	Payton Thorne	17/30, 215 yards, 1 TD, 1 INT
Michigan State	Rushing	Elijah Collins	7 carries, 22 yards
Michigan State	Receiving	Keon Coleman	5 receptions, 155 yards, 1 TD
No. 4 Michigan	Passing	J. J. McCarthy	15/25, 167 yards, 1 TD
No. 4 Michigan	Rushing	Blake Corum	33 carries, 177 yards, 1 TD
No. 4 Michigan	Receiving	Luke Schoonmaker	5 receptions, 70 yards

==== Melee in the tunnel ====
After the game, an incident broke out in the Michigan Stadium tunnel. Several Michigan State players assaulted Michigan defensive backs Gemon Green and JaDen McBurrows. Chris Solari of the Detroit Free Press was present and reported that he saw Michigan State players punching, shoving and kicking McBurrows. McBurrows reportedly sustained a nose injury. Green was struck by a helmet swung by a Michigan State player, reportedly sustained a concussion and facial cuts, and hired attorney Tom Mars to file a lawsuit for assault.

Reaction to the incident was swift. In his postgame news conference, Jim Harbaugh described the incident as a "10 on 1, pretty bad," and noted that one of the players sustained a "nasal injury." Bob Wojnowski of The Detroit News described it as a "brutal attack" and condemned the actions of the Michigan State players as "profound cowardice."

Michigan State coach Mel Tucker tweeted the next morning: "While emotions were very high at the conclusion of our rivalry game at Michigan Stadium, there is no excuse for behavior that puts our team or our opponents at risk." On the Sunday evening after the game, Tucker announced the suspension of four players: Angelo Grose, Zion Young, Itayvion "Tank" Brown, and Khary Crump. On November 1, Michigan State suspended four additional players: Malcolm Jones, Justin White, Jacoby Windmon and Brandon Wright. On November 23, criminal charges for felonious assault, aggravated assault, or assault and battery were filed against seven Michigan State players in connection with the tunnel incident. On November 28, following the Big Ten's investigation, it was announced that the Spartans were fined $100,000 and Khary Crump was suspended for the first eight games of the 2023 season. On December 24, a plea deal was announced and on January 5, 2023, Khary Crump will plead guilty to misdemeanor counts of assault/battery and disorderly conduct person-jostling.

=== At Rutgers ===
No. 5 Michigan at Rutgers

Team	1	2	3	4	Total
• No. 5 Wolverines	14	0	28	10	52
Scarlet Knights	7	10	0	0	17

- Date: November 5
- Location: SHI Stadium
  Piscataway, NJ
- Game start: 7:40 p.m. EDT
- Elapsed time: 3:25
- Game attendance: 51,117
- Game weather: 69 °F (21 °C), clear, S 7 MPH
- Referee: Jeff Servinski
- TV announcers (BTN): Brandon Gaudin, Jake Butt, and Rick Pizzo

Scoring summary
1	8:47	MICH	Blake Corum 1-yard run (Jake Moody kick)	MICH 7–0
1	5:04	RUT	Timmy Ward 7-yard blocked punt return (Jude McAtamney kick)	Tied 7–7
1	1:46	MICH	J. J. McCarthy 1-yard run (Jake Moody kick)	MICH 14–7
2	13:33	RUT	Jude McAtamney 32-yard field goal	MICH 14–10
2	1:44	RUT	Sean Ryan 3-yard pass from Gavin Wimsatt (Jude McAtamney kick)	RUT 17–14
3	8:24	MICH	Donovan Edwards 14-yard pass from J. J. McCarthy (Jake Moody kick)	MICH 21–17
3	6:53	MICH	Blake Corum 2-yard run (Jake Moody kick)	MICH 28–17
3	6:42	MICH	Michael Barrett 31-yard interception return (Jake Moody kick)	MICH 35–17
3	0:23	MICH	Cornelius Johnson 6-yard pass from J. J. McCarthy (Jake Moody kick)	MICH 42–17
4	11:18	MICH	Jake Moody 29-yard field goal	MICH 45–17
4	3:23	MICH	Isaiah Gash 4-yard run (Jake Moody kick)	MICH 52–17

On November 5, Michigan defeated Rutgers, 52–17, at SHI Stadium in Piscataway, New Jersey.

On the opening drive of the game, Michigan drove 75 yards in 12 plays, ending with a one-yard touchdown run by Blake Corum. On Michigan's second possession, Rutgers blocked a Michigan punt, and Timmy Ward recovered the loose ball and returned it seven yards for a touchdown. After its touchdown, Rutgers attempted an on-side kick, but Michigan recovered the ball at midfield. The Wolverines then drove 50 yards on six plays with J. J. McCarthy carrying the ball one yard for a touchdown. Michigan led, 14–7, at the end of the first quarter.

Jude McAtamney of Rutgers kicked a 32-yard field goal early in the second quarter. The teams exchanged punts on the next two drives, and Jake Moody missed on a 50-yard field goal attempt with 4:42 remaining in the first half. After the missed field goal, Rutgers drove 68 yards on eight plays, including a 48-yard pass from Gavin Wimsatt to Chris Long and ending with a three-yard touchdown pass from Wimsatt to Sean Ryan. Rutgers led, 17–14, at halftime.

Rutgers was held scoreless and gained only 57 yards of total offense in the second half. On their first possession of the third quarter, Michigan drove 53 yards on eight plays, ending with a 14-yard touchdown pass from McCarthy to Donovan Edwards at the 8:24 mark. Michigan's second drive of the quarter started at Rutger's 10-yard line following Michael Barrett's interception of a Wimsatt pass. Corum scored on a two-yard touchdown run at the 6:53 mark. On Rutgers' next possession, Barrett intercepted another Wimsatt pass and returned it 31 yards for a touchdown at the 6:42 mark. Michigan tallied 21 points in less than a minute-and-a-half of game time. Later in the third quarter, Will Johnson intercepted a Wimsatt pass, and Michigan took over at Rutgers' 31-yard line. After a 28-yard run by Corum, Cornelius Johnson scored on a six-yard touchdown pass from McCarthy. Michigan led, 38–14, at the end of the third quarter.

Early in the fourth quarter, Michigan drove 61 yards on eight run plays by Davis Warren, scoring on a 29-yard field goal by Jake Moody. Later in the quarter, the Wolverines drove 58 yards on eight plays by C.J. Stokes, Davis Warren, Tavierre Dunlap, and Isaiah Gash. The drive ended with a four-yard touchdown run by Gash with 3:23 remaining in the game.

Michigan's honorary captain for the game was film director Spike Lee. Blake Corum scored two touchdowns and rushed for 109 yards, his sixth consecutive 100-yard rushing game. With his third-quarter extra point, kicker Jake Moody became the fifth player in Michigan history to reach 300 career points.

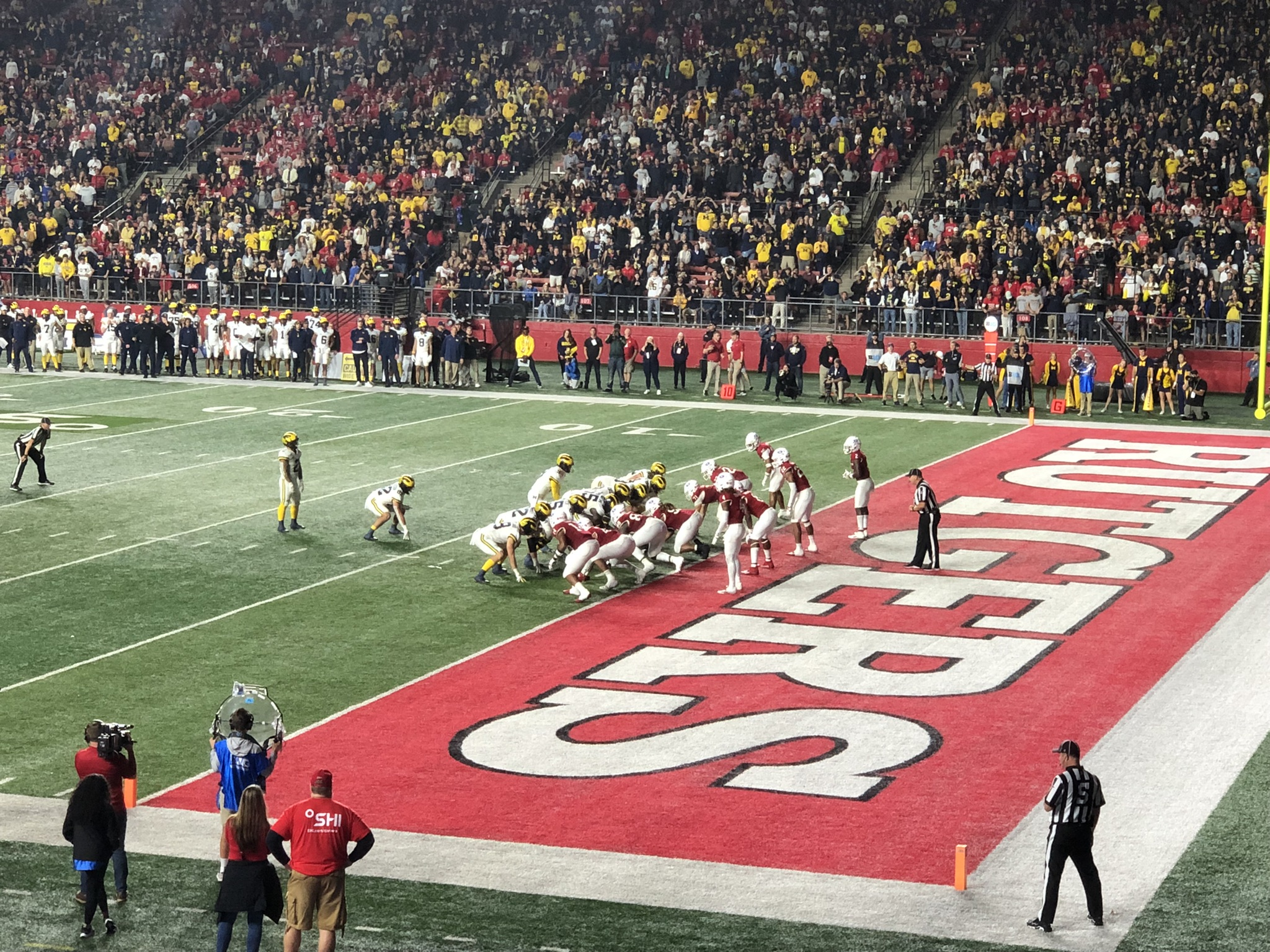
Michigan lines up on the Rutgers 2-yard line before Blake Corum scored to give the Wolverines a 27–17 lead in the third quarter.

Statistics	No. 5 UM	RU
First downs	22	5
Plays–yards	80–433	48–180
Rushes–yards	53–282	19–14
Passing yards	151	166
Passing: comp–att–int	13–27–0	14–29–3
Turnovers		
Time of possession	37:41	22:19

Team	Category	Player	Statistics
No. 5 Michigan	Passing	J. J. McCarthy	13/27, 151 yards, 2 TD
No. 5 Michigan	Rushing	Blake Corum	20 carries, 109 yards, 2 TD
No. 5 Michigan	Receiving	Donovan Edwards	3 receptions, 52 yards, 1 TD
Rutgers	Passing	Gavin Wimsatt	14/29, 166 yards, 1 TD, 3 INT
Rutgers	Rushing	Kyle Monangai	4 carries, 17 yards
Rutgers	Receiving	Aron Cruikshank	7 receptions, 62 yards

=== Nebraska ===
Nebraska at No. 3 Michigan

Team	1	2	3	4	Total
Cornhuskers	0	3	0	0	3
• No. 3 Wolverines	7	10	7	10	34

- Date: November 12
- Location: Michigan Stadium
  Ann Arbor, MI
- Game start: 3:36 p.m. EST
- Elapsed time: 3:14
- Game attendance: 110,912
- Game weather: 40 °F (4 °C), snow, NW 10 MPH
- Referee: Jerry McGinn
- TV announcers (ABC): Mark Jones, Robert Griffin III, and Quint Kessenich

Scoring summary
1	4:26	MICH	Blake Corum 2-yard run (Jake Moody kick)	MICH 7–0
2	8:46	MICH	Ronnie Bell 9-yard pass from J. J. McCarthy (Jake Moody kick)	MICH 14–0
2	4:10	NEB	Timmy Bleekrode 37-yard field goal	MICH 14–3
2	0:01	MICH	Jake Moody 30-yard field goal	MICH 17–3
3	0:57	MICH	J. J. McCarthy 3-yard run (Jake Moody kick)	MICH 24–3
4	9:39	MICH	Andrel Anthony 0-yard pass from J. J. McCarthy (Jake Moody kick)	MICH 31–3
4	1:17	MICH	Jake Moody 43-yard field goal	MICH 34–3

On November 12, Michigan defeated Nebraska, 34–3, in front of a crowd of 110,912 at Michigan Stadium.

After the opening kickoff, Nebraska drove to Michigan's 35-yard line, but a false start penalty and a sack by Junior Colson pushed the Cornhuskers back to the 41-yard line where they were forced to punt. The Wolverines took over at the 20-yard line and drove 80 yards on 12 plays, finally scoring on a two-yard run by Blake Corum. The teams traded punts on the next five possessions. Michigan led, 7–0, at the end of the first quarter.

With 8:46 remaining in the second quarter, J. J. McCarthy threw a nine-yard touchdown pass to Ronnie Bell to cap a 66-yard drive. Nebraska responded with a 56-yard drive that included a pass to Alante Brown in which Brown tried to hurdle over Mike Sainristil, but Sainristil jumped as well, his helmet striking Brown between his legs, causing Brown to tumble head first to the ground. Nebraska's drive ended with a 37-yard field goal by Timmy Bleekrode. Late in the second quarter, Michigan drove 55 yards on 12 plays, and Jake Moody kicked a 30-yard field goal with one second remaining. Michigan led, 17–3, at halftime.

Michigan held Nebraska to 43 yards of offense and zero points in the second half. On Michigan's second possession of the half, they drove 65 yards on 10 plays and scored on a three-yard touchdown run by McCarthy. In the fourth quarter, Michigan extended its lead with a 76-yard touchdown drive ending with a 29-yard pass from McCarthy to Bell; Bell fumbled the ball into the end zone and Andrel Anthony recovered the ball for a touchdown before it bounced out of bounds. Michigan concluded the scoring with 4:35 remaining on a 43-yard field goal by Moody.

Michigan out-gained Nebraska by a total of 412 yards to 146, as the Cornhuskers reached the red zone only once. Corum led the way on offense for Michigan, totaling 162 rushing yards on 28 carries. McCarthy completed eight of 17 passes for 129 yards and two touchdowns. Moody's first-quarter extra point gave him 100 for the season, becoming the third player in Michigan history to record consecutive seasons with 100-plus points, following Anthony Thomas (1999–2000) and Tom Harmon (1939–40).

Statistics	NU	No. 3 UM
First downs	8	27
Plays–yards	49–146	69–412
Rushes–yards	29–75	49–264
Passing yards	71	148
Passing: comp–att–int	10–20–0	10–20–0
Turnovers		
Time of possession	24:28	35:32

Team	Category	Player	Statistics
Nebraska	Passing	Chubba Purdy	6/12, 56 yards
Nebraska	Rushing	Chubba Purdy	5 carries, 39 yards
Nebraska	Receiving	Marcus Washington	2 receptions, 36 yards
No. 3 Michigan	Passing	J. J. McCarthy	8/17, 129 yards, 2 TD
No. 3 Michigan	Rushing	Blake Corum	28 carries, 162 yards, 2 TD
No. 3 Michigan	Receiving	Ronnie Bell	4 receptions, 72 yards, 1 TD

=== Illinois ===
Illinois at No. 3 Michigan
(rivalry)

Team	1	2	3	4	Total
Fighting Illini	0	3	14	0	17
• No. 3 Wolverines	7	0	3	9	19

- Date: November 19
- Location: Michigan Stadium
  Ann Arbor, MI
- Game start: 12:07 p.m. EST
- Elapsed time: 3:29
- Game attendance: 110,433
- Game weather: 25 °F (−4 °C), sunny, SW 15 MPH
- Referee: Michael Cannon
- TV announcers (ABC): Sean McDonough, Todd Blackledge, Molly McGrath, and Todd McShay

Scoring summary
1	11:28	MICH	Blake Corum 2-yard run (Jake Moody kick)	MICH 7–0
2	4:03	ILL	Caleb Griffin 29-yard field goal	MICH 7–3
3	11:10	MICH	Jake Moody 46-yard field goal	MICH 10–3
3	7:43	ILL	Chase Brown 8-yard run (Caleb Griffin kick)	Tied 10–10
3	1:36	ILL	Chase Brown 37-yard run (Caleb Griffin kick)	ILL 17–10
4	12:31	MICH	Jake Moody 41-yard field goal	ILL 17–13
4	3:14	MICH	Jake Moody 33-yard field goal	ILL 17–16
4	0:09	MICH	Jake Moody 35-yard field goal	MICH 19–17

On November 19, Michigan came from behind with three fourth-quarter field goals to defeat Illinois by a 19–17 before a crowd of 110,433 at Michigan Stadium.

On the opening possession, Michigan drove 75 yards on seven plays, scoring on a two-yard touchdown run by Blake Corum. Over the next four possessions, neither team scored. Late in the second quarter, Illinois drove 59 yards, and Caleb Griffith kicked a 29-yard field goal. Shortly before the end of the half, Michigan drove 62 yards to the Illinois 17-yard line, but turned the ball over on a fumble by Corum at the 13-yard line. Corum injured his knee on the play. Michigan led, 7–3, at halftime.

On the opening drive of the second half, Illinois was held to a three-and-out. After a short 22-yard punt by Hugh Robertson, Michigan drove 24 yards to Illinois 28-yard line, and Jake Moody kicked a 46-yard field goal. Illinois then took the lead with touchdowns on its next two drives; Chase Brown scored on runs of eight and 37 yards. Illinois led, 17–10, at the end of the third quarter, marking the first time Michigan trailed in the second half of a game to that point in the season.

Michigan scored nine points in the fourth quarter on three field goals by Moody from 41 yards, 33 yards, and 35 yards, respectively.

Corum rushed for 108 yards during the first half of the game, before leaving the game due to injury. This was his eighth consecutive 100-yard rushing game, the longest streak by a Wolverine since Mike Hart in 2007. Corum surpassed Tony Boles (1,408 yards, 1988) to reach the top ten all-time in single-season rushing yards.

Statistics	UI	No. 3 UM
First downs	20	18
Plays–yards	64–326	74–376
Rushes–yards	34–148	40–168
Passing yards	178	208
Passing: comp–att–int	21–30–0	18–34–0
Turnovers		
Time of possession	24:57	35:03

Team	Category	Player	Statistics
Illinois	Passing	Tommy DeVito	21/30, 178 yards
Illinois	Rushing	Chase Brown	29 carries, 140 yards, 2 TD
Illinois	Receiving	Casey Washington	6 receptions, 53 yards
No. 3 Michigan	Passing	J. J. McCarthy	18/34, 208 yards
No. 3 Michigan	Rushing	Blake Corum	18 carries, 108 yards, 1 TD
No. 3 Michigan	Receiving	Colston Loveland	3 receptions, 50 yards

=== At No. 2 Ohio State ===
No. 3 Michigan at No. 2 Ohio State
(The Game)

Team	1	2	3	4	Total
• No. 3 Wolverines	3	14	7	21	45
No. 2 Buckeyes	10	10	0	3	23

- Date: November 26
- Location: Ohio Stadium
  Columbus, OH
- Game start: 12:16 p.m. EST
- Elapsed time: 3:36
- Game attendance: 106,787
- Game weather: 50 °F (10 °C), sunny, S 5 MPH
- Referee: Mark Kluczynski
- TV announcers (FOX): Gus Johnson, Joel Klatt, and Tom Rinaldi

Scoring summary
1	10:02	OSU	Emeka Egbuka 4-yard pass from C. J. Stroud (Noah Ruggles kick)	OSU 7–0
1	6:07	MICH	Jake Moody 49-yard field goal	OSU 7–3
1	1:19	OSU	Noah Ruggles 32-yard field goal	OSU 10–3
2	7:26	MICH	Cornelius Johnson 69-yard pass from J. J. McCarthy (Jake Moody kick)	Tied 10–10
2	5:36	OSU	Noah Ruggles 47-yard field goal	OSU 13–10
2	5:24	MICH	Cornelius Johnson 75-yard pass from J. J. McCarthy (Jake Moody kick)	MICH 17–13
2	3:49	OSU	Marvin Harrison Jr. 42-yard pass from C. J. Stroud (Noah Ruggles kick)	OSU 20–17
3	11:56	MICH	Colston Loveland 45-yard pass from J. J. McCarthy (Jake Moody kick)	MICH 24–20
4	13:10	MICH	J. J. McCarthy 3-yard run (Jake Moody kick)	MICH 31–20
4	7:23	OSU	Noah Ruggles 27-yard field goal	MICH 31–23
4	7:11	MICH	Donovan Edwards 75-yard run (Jake Moody kick)	MICH 38–23
4	3:19	MICH	Donovan Edwards 85-yard run (Jake Moody kick)	MICH 45–23

On November 26, Michigan (ranked No. 3) defeated rival Ohio State (ranked No. 2), 45–23, before a crowd of 106,787 at Ohio Stadium in Columbus, Ohio. With the victory, Michigan won the Big Ten East Division championship and improved to 12–0 for the first time since 1997.

Ohio State opened the game with a 12-play, 81-yard touchdown drive, scoring on a four-yard touchdown pass from C. J. Stroud to Emeka Egbuka. Michigan responded with a 44-yard, 10-play drive, including a 33-yard pass from J. J. McCarthy to Ronnie Bell, and ending with a 49-yard field goal by Jake Moody. On their second possession, the Buckeyes drove 58 yards on 10 plays, and Noah Ruggles kicked a 32-yard field goal with 1:19 remaining in the first quarter. Ohio State led, 10–3, at the end of the first quarter.

Halfway through the second quarter, J. J. McCarthy connected with Cornelius Johnson on a sideline out pass; Johnson broke a tackle, and ran for a touchdown, the play covering 69 yards. Ohio State responded with a 47-yard field goal by Ruggles to regain the lead. Michigan took the lead with a second long touchdown pass from McCarthy to Johnson, this one down the middle of the field covering 75 yards. Ohio State then drove 79 yards on four plays, ending with a 42-yard touchdown pass from Stroud to Marvin Harrison Jr. The half ended with three consecutive three-and-outs, two by Michigan and one by Ohio State. The Buckeyes led, 20–17, at halftime.

Michigan took the second-half kickoff and drove 75 yards on seven plays, including a 19-yard run by McCarthy and culminating with a 45-yard touchdown pass from McCarthy to freshman tight end Colston Loveland. The defenses dominated the balance of the third quarter as Ohio State punted twice and Michigan once. Michigan led, 24–20, at the end of the third quarter.

Michigan extended its lead early in the fourth quarter on a three-yard touchdown run by McCarthy, culminating a 15-play, 81-yard drive that consumed 7:51 off the clock. On Michigan's next possession, Moody missed a 57-yard field goal attempt. Ohio State then drove 52 yards to the Michigan nine-yard line. On third-and-four from the nine-yard line, Stroud threw a pass that landed in the hands of Cade Stover in the end zone, but Mike Sainristil knocked the ball from Stovers' hand, and the Buckeyes settled for a 27-yard field goal by Ruggles. On the next play from scrimmage after the field goal, Donovan Edwards, wearing a cast on his right hand, scored on a 75-yard touchdown run down the right sideline with 7:11 remaining in the game. Ohio State then drove 59 yards to Michigan's 16-yard line. On third down from the 16-yard line, Stroud tossed a shovel pass that was intercepted by Taylor Upshaw at the eight-yard line. Edwards then scored on his second long run of the quarter, this time for 85 yards. With 1:48 remaining in the game, Makari Paige intercepted a Stroud pass, and Michigan was able to run out the clock.

At the end of the game, Michigan defensive back Mike Sainristil planted a "Block M" flag in the "O" logo in the middle of the field. The victory gave Michigan consecutive victories over Ohio State for the first time since the 1999 and 2000 seasons. It was also Michigan's first victory at Ohio Stadium since 2000. McCarthy became the first quarterback in program history to begin his career with at least 11 wins as a starter before taking his first loss, surpassing the previous record of 10 set by Dennis Franklin in 1972.

Statistics	No. 3 UM	No. 2 OSU
First downs	16	23
Plays–yards	60–530	77–492
Rushes–yards	35–252	29–143
Passing yards	278	349
Passing: comp–att–int	13–25–0	31–48–2
Turnovers		
Time of possession	28:14	31:46

Team	Category	Player	Statistics
No. 3 Michigan	Passing	J. J. McCarthy	12/24, 263 yards, 3 TD
No. 3 Michigan	Rushing	Donovan Edwards	22 carries, 216 yards, 2 TD
No. 3 Michigan	Receiving	Cornelius Johnson	4 receptions, 160 yards, 2 TD
No. 2 Ohio State	Passing	C. J. Stroud	31/48, 349 yards, 2 TD, 2 INT
No. 2 Ohio State	Rushing	DeaMonte Trayanum	14 carries, 83 yards
No. 2 Ohio State	Receiving	Emeka Egbuka	9 receptions, 125 yards, TD

=== vs Purdue—Big Ten Championship Game ===
No. 2 Michigan vs. Purdue
(Big Ten Championship Game)

Team	1	2	3	4	Total
Boilermakers	7	6	3	6	22
• No. 2 Wolverines	7	7	14	15	43

- Date: December 3
- Location: Lucas Oil Stadium
  Indianapolis, IN
- Game start: 8:17 p.m. EST
- Elapsed time: 3:42
- Game attendance: 67,107
- Game weather: Indoors
- Referee: Jerry McGinn
- TV announcers (FOX): Gus Johnson, Joel Klatt, and Allison Williams

Scoring summary
1	9:11	MICH	Colston Loveland 25-yard pass from J. J. McCarthy (Jake Moody kick)	MICH 7–0
1	4:13	PUR	Devin Mockobee 1-yard run (Mitchell Fineran kick)	Tied 7–7
2	13:39	PUR	Mitchell Fineran 33-yard field goal	PUR 10–7
2	7:05	MICH	Luke Schoonmaker 7-yard pass from J. J. McCarthy (Jake Moody kick)	MICH 14–10
2	1:27	PUR	Mitchell Fineran 45-yard field goal	MICH 14–13
3	12:25	MICH	Kalel Mullings 1-yard run (Jake Moody kick)	MICH 21–13
3	10:32	MICH	Donovan Edwards 27-yard run (Jake Moody kick)	MICH 28–13
3	3:37	PUR	Mitchell Fineran 43-yard field goal	MICH 28–16
4	12:37	PUR	Mitchell Fineran 27-yard field goal	MICH 28–19
4	9:06	MICH	Ronnie Bell 17-yard pass from J.J. McCarthy (J. J. McCarthy–Luke Schoonmaker pass)	MICH 36–19
4	5:07	PUR	Mitchell Fineran 32-yard field goal	MICH 36–22
4	1:22	MICH	Kalel Mullings 3-yard run (Jake Moody kick)	MICH 43–22

On December 3, having won the Big Ten East championship, Michigan played Big Ten West champion Purdue in the Big Ten Championship Game at Lucas Oil Stadium in Indianapolis. The Wolverines defeated the Boilermakers, 43–22. It was Michigan's second consecutive appearance (and second consecutive victory) in the championship game and the first appearance for Purdue.

After holding Purdue to a three-and-out following the opening kickoff, Michigan drove 55 yards on seven plays, scoring on a 25-yard pass from J. J. McCarthy to Colston Loveland. Purdue responded with a 10-play, 92-yard drive on which Aidan O'Connell completed all six of his passes; the drive ended with a one-yard touchdown run by Devin Mockobee. The score was tied, 7–7, at the end of the first quarter.

On a drive that began late in the first quarter, Purdue went 46 yards on 11 plays, and Mitchell Fineran kicked a 33-yard field goal to give Purdue a 10–7 lead. Michigan responded with a 13-play, 75-yard drive that included a fourth-down conversion on a two-yard run by Kalel Mullings and ended with a seven-yard touchdown pass from McCarthy to Luke Schoonmaker. Purdue then drove 47 yards in 13 plays, and Fineran kicked a 45-yard field goal. Michigan led, 14–13, at halftime.

Following the second-half kickoff, Michigan drove 75 yards on five plays, including a 60-yard run by Donovan Edwards and a one-yard touchdown run by Mullings – Mullings' first collegiate touchdown. Michigan held Purdue to a three-and-out and then drove 67 yards on two plays: a 40-yard pass from McCarthy to Schoonmaker and a 27-yard touchdown run by Edwards. Later in the quarter, Fineran kicked his third field goal, this one from 43 yards. Michigan led, 28–19, at the end of the third quarter.

With 1:35 remaining in the third quarter, Purdue's Jamari Bown intercepted a pass by McCarthy – breaking McCarthy's streak of 148 straight attempts without an interception. Purdue then drove 66 yards, but settled for its fourth field goal, a 27-yarder with 12:37 remaining in the game. With 9:57 remaining, Michigan cornerback Will Johnson recorded his second interception of the game at the Purdue 16-yard line. Michigan scored on a 17-yard pass from McCarthy to Ronnie Bell. McCarthy threw a pass to Schoonmaker for a two-point conversion. Purdue then drove 60 yards but settled for a 32-yard field goal by Fineran. In the closing minutes of the game, Michigan recovered an on-side kick and drove 44 yards with Mullings scoring on a three-yard touchdown run.

The victory gave Michigan the first 13-win season in program history and consecutive conference titles for the first time since the 1991 and 1992 seasons. Donovan Edwards finished the game with 25 carries for 185 yards and a touchdown and was selected as the game's most valuable player. J. J. McCarthy completed 11 of 17 passes for 161 yards, three touchdowns and an interception. Kalel Mullings had eight carries for 26 yards and two touchdowns. The victory also gave McCarthy a 12–0 record, the most wins in Michigan history to begin a starting quarterback's career.

Statistics	PU	No. 2 UM
First downs	27	17
Plays–yards	84–456	55–386
Rushes–yards	37–90	38–225
Passing yards	366	161
Passing: comp–att–int	32–47–2	11–17–1
Turnovers		
Time of possession	33:42	26:18

Team	Category	Player	Statistics
Purdue	Passing	Aidan O'Connell	32/47, 366 yards, 2 INT
Purdue	Rushing	Devin Mockobee	17 carries, 71 yards, 1 TD
Purdue	Receiving	Charlie Jones	13 receptions, 162 yards
No. 2 Michigan	Passing	J. J. McCarthy	11/17, 161 yards, 3 TD, 1 INT
No. 2 Michigan	Rushing	Donovan Edwards	25 carries, 185 yards, 1 TD
No. 2 Michigan	Receiving	Ronnie Bell	5 receptions, 67 yards, 1 TD

=== Vs. No. 3 TCU—Fiesta Bowl (CFP Semifinal) ===
No. 3 TCU vs. No. 2 Michigan
(Fiesta Bowl–CFP Semifinal)

Team	1	2	3	4	Total
• No. 3 Horned Frogs	14	7	20	10	51
No. 2 Wolverines	0	6	24	15	45

- Date: December 31
- Location: State Farm Stadium
  Glendale, AZ
- Game start: 2:11 p.m. MST
- Elapsed time: 3:55
- Game attendance: 71,723
- Game weather: Indoors
- Referee: Jason Autrey
- TV announcers (ESPN/ESPN Radio): Sean McDonough, Todd Blackledge, Molly McGrath, and Tiffany Blackmon/Marc Kestecher, Kelly Stouffer, and Ian Fitzsimmons

Scoring summary
1	9:22	TCU	Bud Clark 41-yard interception return (Griffin Kell kick)	TCU 7–0
1	2:27	TCU	Max Duggan 1-yard run (Griffin Kell kick)	TCU 14–0
2	13:46	MICH	Jake Moody 42-yard field goal	TCU 14–3
2	4:56	TCU	Taye Barber 6-yard pass from Max Duggan (Griffin Kell kick)	TCU 21–3
2	0:00	MICH	Jake Moody 59-yard field goal	TCU 21–6
3	9:29	MICH	Jake Moody 21-yard field goal	TCU 21–9
3	6:32	MICH	Ronnie Bell 34-yard pass from J. J. McCarthy (Jake Moody kick)	TCU 21–16
3	4:25	TCU	Emari Demercado 1-yard run (Griffin Kell kick)	TCU 28–16
3	2:52	TCU	Dee Winters 29-yard interception return	TCU 34–16
3	1:47	MICH	J. J. McCarthy 20-yard run	TCU 34–22
3	0:49	TCU	Max Duggan 1-yard run (Griffin Kell kick)	TCU 41–22
3	0:03	MICH	Kalel Mullings 1-yard run (J. J. McCarthy run)	TCU 41–30
4	14:13	MICH	Roman Wilson 18-yard run (J. J. McCarthy–Ronnie Bell pass)	TCU 41–38
4	13:07	TCU	Quentin Johnston 76-yard pass from Max Duggan (Griffin Kell kick)	TCU 48–38
4	10:02	TCU	Griffin Kell 33-yard field goal	TCU 51–38
4	3:18	MICH	Roman Wilson 5-yard pass from J. J. McCarthy (Jake Moody kick)	TCU 51–45

In the final College Football Playoff rankings of the year announced on December 4, Michigan (13–0) was ranked second, earning their second playoff bid and a spot in the semifinal game to be played at the 2022 Fiesta Bowl against TCU (12–1).

Michigan lost to TCU 45–51. TCU scored 14 points in the first quarter via a 41-yard interception return by Bud Clark and a one-yard touchdown run by Max Duggan. Michigan finally got on the board in the second quarter via a 42-yard field goal by Jake Moody. TCU extended their lead via a six-yard touchdown pass from Duggan to Taye Barber. Michigan responded with a 59-yard field goal by Moody as time expired in the half, which made the score 21–6 in favor of TCU at halftime. The 59-yard field goal by Moody set the program record for longest field goal made at, surpassing the previous record of 57-yards held by Quinn Nordin and Hayden Epstein. TCU scored 20 points in the third quarter via a one-yard touchdown run by Emari Demercado, a 29-yard interception return by Dee Winters, and a one-yard touchdown run by Duggan. Michigan scored 24 points in the quarter via a 21-yard field goal by Moody, a 34-yard touchdown pass from J. J. McCarthy to Ronnie Bell, a 20-yard touchdown run by McCarthy and a one-yard touchdown run by Kalel Mullings. TCU scored 10 points in the fourth quarter via a 76-yard touchdown pass from Duggan to Quentin Johnston and a 33-yard field goal by Griffin Kell. Michigan scored 15 points in the quarter via an 18-yard touchdown run by Roman Wilson and a five-yard touchdown pass from McCarthy to Wilson.

With Moody's field goal in the second quarter, he broke Desmond Howard's single-season scoring record (138 points) set in 1991, and finished with 147 points during the season. Moody finished his career with 355 points, setting a new all-time Michigan scoring record, surpassing the previous record of 354 points set by Garrett Rivas.

Statistics	No. 3 TCU	No. 2 UM
First downs	19	25
Plays–yards	70–488	75–528
Rushes–yards	41–263	40–186
Passing yards	225	342
Passing: comp–att–int	14–29–2	21–35–2
Turnovers		
Time of possession	27:35	32:25

Team	Category	Player	Statistics
No. 3 TCU	Passing	Max Duggan	14/29, 225 yards, 2 TD, 2 INT
No. 3 TCU	Rushing	Emari Demercado	17 carries, 152 yards, TD
No. 3 TCU	Receiving	Quentin Johnston	6 receptions, 163 yards, TD
No. 2 Michigan	Passing	J. J. McCarthy	20/34, 343 yards, 2 TD, 2 INT
No. 2 Michigan	Rushing	Donovan Edwards	23 carries, 127 yards
No. 2 Michigan	Receiving	Ronnie Bell	6 receptions, 135 yards, TD

== Personnel ==
=== Roster ===
2022 Michigan Wolverines football team roster
Players
Coaches
Offense

Pos.	#	Name	Class
WR	0	Darrius Clemons	Fr
WR	1	Andrel Anthony	So
RB	2	Blake Corum	Jr
WR	3	A. J. Henning	Jr
WR	4	Amorion Walker	Fr
QB	5	Brandon Mann	Fr
WR	6	Cornelius Johnson	Sr
RB	7	Donovan Edwards	So
WR	8	Ronnie Bell (C)	Sr
QB	9	J. J. McCarthy	So
QB	10	Alex Orji	Fr
QB	12	Cade McNamara (injured) (C)	Jr
WR	13	Tyler Morris	Fr
WR	14	Roman Wilson	Jr
QB	15	Alan Bowman	Sr
QB	15	Andy Maddox	Jr
QB	16	Jayden Denegal	Fr
QB	16	Davis Warren	Fr
TE	17	Marlin Klein	Fr
TE	18	Colston Loveland	Fr
QB	20	Declan Byle	Fr
RB	22	Tavierre Dunlap	Fr
RB	23	C. J. Stokes	Fr
RB	24	Danny Hughes	Jr
WR	25	Zach Peterson	Sr
WR	26	Jake Thaw	So
WR	27	Christian Bartholomew	So
WR	30	Will Rolapp	So
RB	31	Nico Andrighetto	Fr
RB	34	Leon Franklin	Jr
WR	35	Logan Forbes	Fr
WR	38	Peyton O'Leary	Fr
CB	39	Joe Taylor	Fr
TE	40	Josh Beetham	So
RB	41	Isaiah Gash	So
TE	45	Noah Howes	Fr
RB	49	Henry Donohue	So
OL	50	Mica Gelb	Jr
OL	51	Greg Crippen	So
OL	52	Karsen Barnhart	Jr
OL	53	Trente Jones	Jr
OL	54	Kraig Correll	Sr
OL	55	Olu Oluwatimi	Sr
OL	58	Giovanni El-Hadi	Fr
OL	60	Connor Jones	Fr
OL	61	Noah Stewart	So
OL	62	Raheem Anderson	Fr
OL, LS	64	James Kavouklis	Fr
OL	65	Zak Zinter	Jr
OL	66	Dan Taraboi	Fr
OL	71	Alessandro Lorenzetti	Fr
OL	72	Tristan Bounds	Fr
OL	74	Reece Atteberry	So
OL	75	Andrew Gentry	Fr
OL	75	Peter Simmons	Fr
OL	76	Ryan Hayes	Sr
OL	77	Trevor Keegan	Jr
OL	79	Jeffrey Persi	So
WR	80	Eamonn Dennis	So
TE	80	Hunter Neff	Jr
TE	81	Louis Hansen	Fr
TE	82	Max Bredeson	Fr
TE	83	Erick All (injured) (C)	Sr
TE	84	Joel Honigford	Sr
WR	84	Sam Staruch	So
WR	85	Cristian Dixon	Fr
TE	86	Luke Schoonmaker	Sr
WR	88	Matthew Harrison	Jr
TE	88	Matthew Hibner	So
TE	89	Carter Selzer	Sr

Defense

Pos.	#	Name	Class
DB, WR	0	Mike Sainristil (C)	Sr
DB	1	Ja'Den McBurrows	Fr
DB	2	Will Johnson	Fr
DB	3	Keon Sabb	Fr
EDGE	4	Micah Pollard	Fr
DB	5	D. J. Turner	Jr
DB	6	R. J. Moten	So
DB	7	Makari Paige	Jr
EDGE	8	Derrick Moore	Fr
DB	9	Damani Dent	Fr
DB	10	Zeke Berry	Fr
DB	12	Kody Jones	Fr
DB	14	Quinten Johnson	Jr
LB	15	Deuce Spurlock	Fr
EDGE	17	Braiden McGregor	So
EDGE	18	Eyabi Okie	Sr
DB	19	Rod Moore	So
LB	20	Kalel Mullings	Jr
DB	22	Gemon Green	Sr
LB	23	Michael Barrett	Sr
DB	24	Myles Pollard	Fr
LB	25	Junior Colson	So
DL	26	Rayshaun Benny	Fr
EDGE	27	Tyler McLaurin	Fr
DB	28	Joshua Nichols	Fr
LB	28	Jimmy Rolder	Fr
LB	29	Joey Velazquez	Jr
DB	30	Shomari Stone	Fr
DB	31	Jalen Perry	Jr
EDGE	32	Jaylen Harrell	So
EDGE	32	Nolan Knight	Jr
DB	33	German Green	Sr
LB	34	Jaydon Hood	Fr
DB	35	Caden Kolesar (injured)	Jr
DB	36	Keshaun Harris	Jr
DB	37	Jahre Fish	Sr
DB	38	Bryce Wilcox	Fr
LB	39	Joel Metzger	So
LB	40	Christian Boivin	Fr
LB	41	Nikhai Hill-Green (injured)	So
EDGE	42	TJ Guy	Fr
DB	42	Jesse Madden	Fr
LB	43	Ryan Zimmerman	Jr
DB	44	Joshua Luther	Jr
LB	46	Alexander Lidback	Fr
LB	50	Jerome Nichols	So
EDGE	52	Kechaun Bennett	Fr
DL	54	George Rooks	Fr
DL	55	Mason Graham	Fr
DL	56	Dominick Giudice	Fr
LB	57	Trevor Andrews	Fr
DL	58	Mazi Smith (C)	Jr
DT	78	Kenneth Grant	Fr
EDGE	90	Mike Morris	Jr
EDGE	91	Taylor Upshaw	Sr
DL	92	Ike Iwunnah	Fr
EDGE	93	Joey Klunder	Fr
DL	94	Kris Jenkins Jr.	So
EDGE	95	Chibi Anwunah	Fr
EDGE	96	Julius Welschof	Sr
DT	99	Cam Goode	Sr

Special teams

Pos.	#	Name	Class
K	13	Jake Moody	Sr
P	19	Tommy Doman	Fr
K, P	29	Rhett Andersen	Sr
LS	45	Greg Tarr	So
LS	46	Evan Boutorwick	Fr
LS	49	William Wagner (injured)	Jr
P	91	Brad Robbins	Sr
K, P	93	Charlie Mentzer	So

Head coach

- Jim Harbaugh

Coordinators/assistant coaches

- Biff Poggi (associate head coach)
- Sherrone Moore (co-offensive coordinator / offensive line)
- Matt Weiss (co-offensive coordinator / quarterbacks)
- Jesse Minter (defensive coordinator)
- Steve Clinkscale (co-defensive coordinator / defensive passing game coordinator / defensive backs)
- Jay Harbaugh (special teams coordinator / safeties)
- Mike Hart (running backs / run game coordinator)
- Ron Bellamy (wide receivers)
- Grant Newsome (tight ends)
- Mike Elston (defensive line / recruiting coordinator)
- George Helow (linebackers)

Legend

- (C) Team captain
- (S) Suspended
- (I) Ineligible
- Injured
- Redshirt

Roster
Last update: November 28, 2022

=== 2022 recruiting class ===
College recruiting
Name	Hometown	School	Height	Weight	Commit date
Will Johnson; CB	Grosse Pointe, Michigan	Grosse Pointe South High School	6 ft 3 in (1.91 m)	190 lb (86 kg)	Feb 28, 2021
Will Johnson; CB	Recruit ratings: Rivals: 247Sports: ESPN:				
Derrick Moore; DL	Baltimore, Maryland	St. Frances Academy	6 ft 4 in (1.93 m)	250 lb (110 kg)	Dec 15, 2021
Derrick Moore; DL	Recruit ratings: Rivals: 247Sports: ESPN:				
Keon Sabb; S	Glassboro, New Jersey	IMG Academy	6 ft 2 in (1.88 m)	200 lb (91 kg)	Dec 15, 2021
Keon Sabb; S	Recruit ratings: Rivals: 247Sports: ESPN:				
Tyler Morris; WR	Bolingbrook, Illinois	Nazareth Academy	6 ft 0 in (1.83 m)	175 lb (79 kg)	Apr 20, 2021
Tyler Morris; WR	Recruit ratings: Rivals: 247Sports: ESPN:				
Darrius Clemons; WR	Portland, Oregon	Westview High School	6 ft 3 in (1.91 m)	205 lb (93 kg)	Dec 15, 2021
Darrius Clemons; WR	Recruit ratings: Rivals: 247Sports: ESPN:				
Zeke Berry; S	Pittsburg, California	De La Salle High School	6 ft 0 in (1.83 m)	185 lb (84 kg)	Dec 3, 2021
Zeke Berry; S	Recruit ratings: Rivals: 247Sports: ESPN:				
Jimmy Rolder; LB	Orland Park, Illinois	Marist High School	6 ft 2 in (1.88 m)	220 lb (100 kg)	Nov 16, 2021
Jimmy Rolder; LB	Recruit ratings: Rivals: 247Sports: ESPN:				
Kody Jones; ATH	Memphis, Tennessee	Germantown High School	5 ft 11.5 in (1.82 m)	180 lb (82 kg)	Feb 5, 2021
Kody Jones; ATH	Recruit ratings: Rivals: 247Sports: ESPN:				
Colston Loveland; TE	Gooding, Idaho	Gooding High School	6 ft 5 in (1.96 m)	230 lb (100 kg)	Jul 4, 2021
Colston Loveland; TE	Recruit ratings: Rivals: 247Sports: ESPN:				
Mason Graham; DL	Anaheim, California	Servite High School	6 ft 4 in (1.93 m)	295 lb (134 kg)	Sep 16, 2021
Mason Graham; DL	Recruit ratings: Rivals: 247Sports: ESPN:				
Alex Orji; QB	Sachse, Texas	Sachse High School	6 ft 2 in (1.88 m)	226 lb (103 kg)	Dec 15, 2021
Alex Orji; QB	Recruit ratings: Rivals: 247Sports: ESPN:				
Kenneth Grant; DL	Merrillville, Indiana	Merrillville High School	6 ft 4 in (1.93 m)	335 lb (152 kg)	Sep 28, 2021
Kenneth Grant; DL	Recruit ratings: Rivals: 247Sports: ESPN:				
Jayden Denegal; QB	Apple Valley, California	Apple Valley High School	6 ft 4 in (1.93 m)	215 lb (98 kg)	Jun 23, 2021
Jayden Denegal; QB	Recruit ratings: Rivals: 247Sports: ESPN:				
Amorion Walker; ATH	Ponchatoula, Louisiana	Ponchatoula High School	6 ft 4 in (1.93 m)	175 lb (79 kg)	Dec 15, 2021
Amorion Walker; ATH	Recruit ratings: Rivals: 247Sports: ESPN:				
Marlin Klein; TE	Cologne, Germany	Rabun Gap-Nacoochee School	6 ft 6 in (1.98 m)	215 lb (98 kg)	Sep 22, 2020
Marlin Klein; TE	Recruit ratings: Rivals: 247Sports: ESPN:				
Myles Pollard; CB	Brentwood, Tennessee	Ravenwood High School	6 ft 2 in (1.88 m)	185 lb (84 kg)	Jul 7, 2021
Myles Pollard; CB	Recruit ratings: Rivals: 247Sports: ESPN:				
Alessandro Lorenzetti; OT	Montreal, Quebec	Loomis Chaffee School	6 ft 6 in (1.98 m)	285 lb (129 kg)	Jun 25, 2021
Alessandro Lorenzetti; OT	Recruit ratings: Rivals: 247Sports: ESPN:				
Micah Pollard; LB	Jacksonville, Florida	Bartram Trail High School	6 ft 3 in (1.91 m)	200 lb (91 kg)	Jul 12, 2021
Micah Pollard; LB	Recruit ratings: Rivals: 247Sports: ESPN:				
CJ Stokes; RB	Columbia, South Carolina	Hammond School	5 ft 11 in (1.80 m)	190 lb (86 kg)	Jun 19, 2021
CJ Stokes; RB	Recruit ratings: Rivals: 247Sports: ESPN:				
Damani Dent; S	Jacksonville, Florida	Terry Parker High School	6 ft 0 in (1.83 m)	190 lb (86 kg)	Oct 18, 2021
Damani Dent; S	Recruit ratings: Rivals: 247Sports: ESPN:				
Deuce Spurlock; ATH	Madison, Alabama	Madison Academy	6 ft 2 in (1.88 m)	200 lb (91 kg)	Sep 26, 2021
Deuce Spurlock; ATH	Recruit ratings: Rivals: 247Sports: ESPN:				
Connor Jones; OT	Monument, Colorado	Palmer Ridge High School	6 ft 7 in (2.01 m)	285 lb (129 kg)	Dec 24, 2020
Connor Jones; OT	Recruit ratings: Rivals: 247Sports: ESPN:				
Overall recruit ranking: Rivals: 8 247Sports: 9
Note: In many cases, Scout, Rivals, 247Sports, On3, and ESPN may conflict in their listings of height and weight.; In these cases, the average was taken. ESPN grades are on a 100-point scale.; Sources: "2022 Michigan football commitments". Rivals.; "2022 Team Ranking". Rivals.com.; "2022 Michigan football commitments". 247Sports.

=== Incoming transfers ===
Michigan incoming transfers
Name	Number	Pos.	Height	Weight	Year	Hometown	Previous team
Cam Goode	99	DT	6'2"	323	GS	Washington, D.C.	UCF
Olu Oluwatimi	55	C	6'3"	307	GS	Upper Marlboro, Maryland	Virginia
Eyabi Okie	18	EDGE	6'5"	244	GS	Baltimore, Maryland	UT Martin

== Awards and honors ==
All-American
Player	AP	AFCA	FWAA	TSN	WCFF	ESPN	CBS	Athletic	USAT	Designation
Blake Corum	1	1	1	1	1	1	1	1	1	Unanimous
Olu Oluwatimi	2	1	1	1	1	1		1	1	Consensus
Jake Moody	2	2			2				2	
Mike Morris		2	2							
The NCAA recognizes a selection to all five of the AP, AFCA, FWAA, TSN and WCFF first teams for unanimous selections and three of five for consensus selections.

Weekly awards
Player	Award	Date awarded	Ref.
Blake Corum	Co-Big Ten Offensive Player of the Week	September 26, 2022	
Blake Corum	Rose Bowl Game B1G Player of the Week	September 26, 2022	
Jake Moody	Big Ten Special Teams Player of the Week	October 17, 2022	
Blake Corum	Big Ten Offensive Player of the Week	October 31, 2022	
Jake Moody	Big Ten Special Teams Player of the Week	October 31, 2022	
Michael Barrett	Rose Bowl Game B1G Player of the Week	November 7, 2022	
Jake Moody	Big Ten Special Teams Player of the Week	November 21, 2022	
Donovan Edwards	Big Ten Offensive Player of the Week	November 28, 2022	
J. J. McCarthy	Rose Bowl Game B1G Player of the Week	November 28, 2022	

Individual awards
Player	Award	Ref.
Blake Corum	Ameche–Dayne Running Back of the Year; Chicago Tribune Silver Football	
Jake Moody	Bakken–Andersen Kicker of the Year	
Mike Morris	Smith–Brown Defensive Lineman of the Year	
Jim Harbaugh	Hayes–Schembechler Coach of the Year	
Olu Oluwatimi	Rimington Trophy; Outland Trophy	

Team awards
Unit	Award	Ref.
Offensive line	Joe Moore Award	

All-Big Ten
Player	Position	Coaches	Media
Blake Corum	RB	1	1
Jake Moody	K	1	1
Mike Morris	DL	1	1
Mazi Smith	DL	1	1
Zak Zinter	OL	1	1
Trevor Keegan	OL	1	2
Olu Oluwatimi	C	1	2
A. J. Henning	KR	2	2
Junior Colson	LB	2	3
Ryan Hayes	OL	2	3
D. J. Turner	DB	2	3
J. J. McCarthy	QB	3	2
Ronnie Bell	WR	3	3
Michael Barrett	LB	3	Hon.
Luke Schoonmaker	TE	3	Hon.
Karsen Barnhart	OL	Hon.	Hon.
Gemon Green	DB	Hon.	Hon.
Kris Jenkins	DL	Hon.	Hon.
Mike Sainristil	DB	Hon.	Hon.
Jaylen Harrell	DL	–	Hon.
Makari Paige	DB	–	Hon.
Rod Moore	DB	–	Hon.
Hon. = Honorable mention. Reference:

== Statistics ==
=== Offensive statistics ===
Rushing
Player	GP	Att	Net Yards	Yds/Att	TD	Long
Blake Corum	12	247	1,463	5.9	18	61
Donovan Edwards	11	140	991	7.1	7	85
J. J. McCarthy	14	70	306	4.4	5	39
C. J. Stokes	11	55	273	5.0	1	21
Isaiah Gash	9	19	101	5.3	2	38

Passing
Player	GP	Att	Comp	Comp %	Yds	TD	Int	Long
J. J. McCarthy	14	322	208	64.6%	2,719	22	5	75
Cade McNamara	3	25	14	56.0%	180	1	1	61
Davis Warren	5	9	5	55.6%	89	0	0	56
Alan Bowman	3	7	6	85.7%	60	1	0	20
Kalel Mullings	12	1	1	100.0%	15	0	0	15

Receiving
Player	GP	Recp	Yds	Yds/Recp	Yds/GP	TD	Long
Ronnie Bell	14	62	889	14.3	63.5	4	49
Cornelius Johnson	14	32	499	15.6	35.6	6	75
Luke Schoonmaker	12	35	418	11.9	34.8	3	40
Roman Wilson	12	25	376	15.0	31.3	4	61
Colston Loveland	14	16	235	14.7	16.8	2	45
Donovan Edwards	11	18	200	11.1	18.2	2	33
Blake Corum	12	11	80	7.3	6.7	1	41
Andrel Anthony	14	7	80	11.4	5.7	1	29
Max Bredeson	14	5	78	15.6	5.6	0	56
A. J. Henning	13	9	60	6.7	4.6	0	16
Erick All	3	3	36	12.0	12.0	0	22
Tyler Morris	8	3	25	8.3	3.1	0	9

=== Defensive statistics ===
Player	GP	Solo	Asst	Tot	TFL	Sack	Int	PBU	QBH
Junior Colson	14	42	59	101.0	6.0	2.0	0	1	1
Michael Barrett	14	37	35	72.0	5.0	3.5	2	1	2
Rod Moore	14	48	23	71.0	1.5	0.5	4	3	1
Mike Sainristil	14	38	20	58.0	6.5	2.0	1	7	3
Kris Jenkins Jr.	14	29	25	54.0	3.5	2.0	0	0	2
Mazi Smith	14	23	25	48.0	2.5	0.5	0	0	1
Makari Paige	12	19	22	41.0	1.0	1.0	1	2	1
D. J. Turner	14	27	9	36.0	1.0	0	1	10	1
R. J. Moten	14	20	11	31.0	2.5	1.5	1	1	2
Jaylen Harrell	13	19	11	30.0	7.5	3.5	0	2	5
Mason Graham	14	14	13	27.0	2.5	2.5	0	1	1
Will Johnson	14	25	2	27.0	2.0	0	3	3	0
Mike Morris	12	17	6	23.0	11.0	7.5	0	3	4
Gemon Green	13	14	6	20.0	0	0	0	4	0
Eyabi Okie	14	7	11	6.0	4.0	0	0	2	4

=== Special teams statistics ===
Kickoff returns
Player	Returns	Yds	Yds/Rtrn	TD	Long
A. J. Henning	11	241	21.9	0	31
Roman Wilson	5	114	22.8	0	26

Punt returns
Player	Returns	Yds	Yds/Rtrn	TD	Long
A. J. Henning	28	201	7.2	1	61
Ronnie Bell	2	45	22.5	0	40

Punts
Player	Punts	Yds	Yds/Punt	Long	50+	Inside 20	T'back
Brad Robbins	43	1,818	42.3	64	9	16	0

Field goals
Player	FGs	Att	Long	Blocked
Jake Moody	29	35	59	1

== 2023 NFL draft ==
Michigan had nine players selected in the 2023 NFL draft, the third most selections in the draft. They became one of six programs in college football to have 400-plus players selected in the NFL draft.

Round	Pick	Player	Position	NFL team
1	26	Mazi Smith	DT	Dallas Cowboys
2	58	Luke Schoonmaker	TE	Dallas Cowboys
2	60	D. J. Turner	CB	Cincinnati Bengals
3	99	Jake Moody	K	San Francisco 49ers
5	151	Mike Morris	DE	Seattle Seahawks
5	154	Olu Oluwatimi	C	Seattle Seahawks
6	217	Brad Robbins	P	Cincinnati Bengals
7	238	Ryan Hayes	OT	Miami Dolphins
7	253	Ronnie Bell	WR	San Francisco 49ers
