= Junior Colson =

American football player (born 2002)

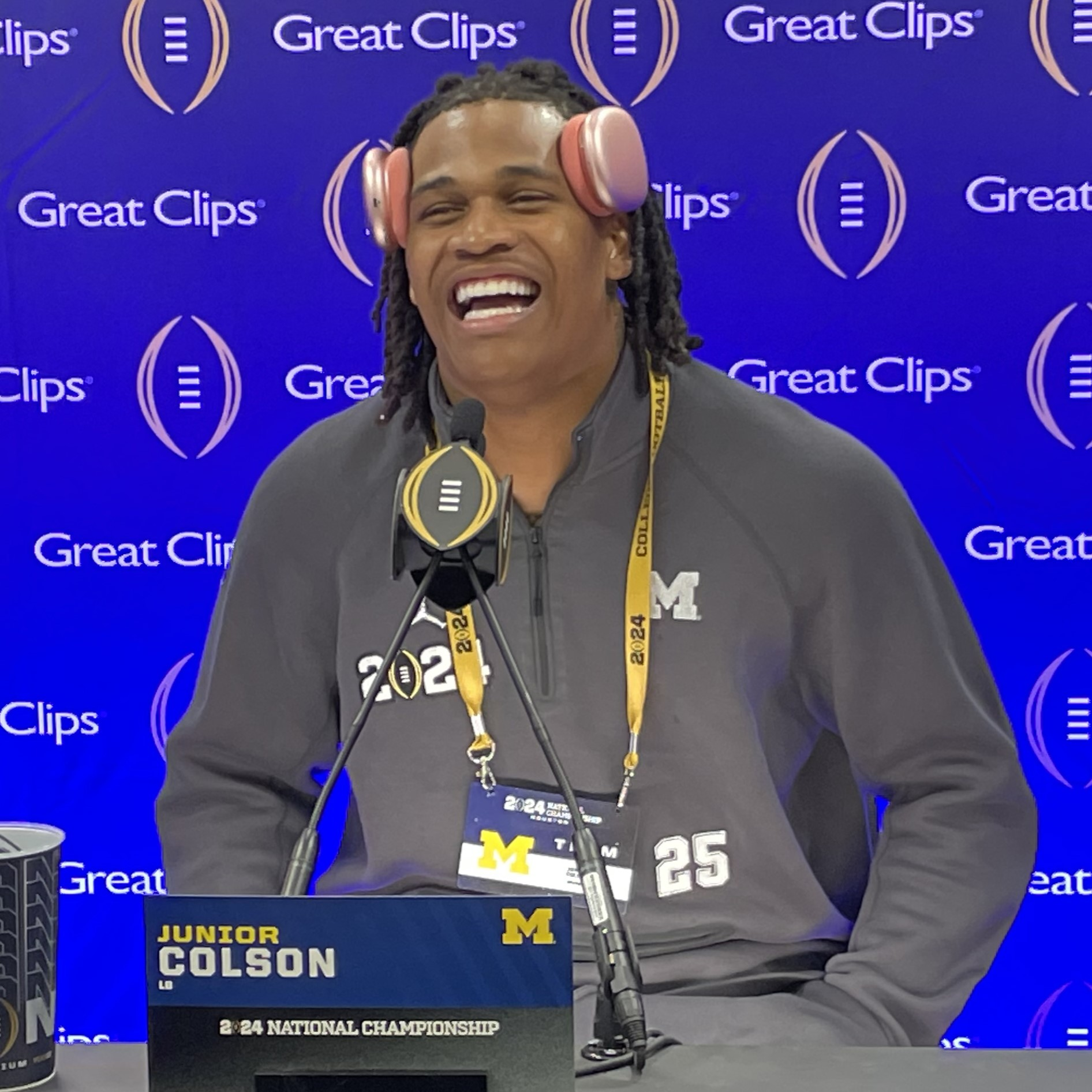
- Colson with the Michigan Wolverines in 2024

No. 25 – Los Angeles Chargers
- Position: Linebacker
- Roster status: Practice squad

Personal information
- Born: December 6, 2002 (age 23); Mirebalais, Haiti
- Listed height: 6 ft 3 in (1.91 m)
- Listed weight: 247 lb (112 kg)

Career information
- High school: Ravenwood (Brentwood, Tennessee, U.S.)
- College: Michigan (2021–2023)
- NFL draft: 2024: 3rd round, 69th overall pick

Career history
- Los Angeles Chargers (2024–present)

Awards and highlights
- CFP national champion (2023); Lott Trophy (2023); 2× second-team All-Big Ten (2022, 2023); Freshman All-American (2021)

Career NFL statistics as of 2024
- Total tackles: 29
- Pass deflections: 1
- Stats at Pro Football Reference

Junior Colson (born December 6, 2002) is a Haitian-American professional football linebacker for the Los Angeles Chargers of the National Football League (NFL). He played college football for the Michigan Wolverines, winning three consecutive Big Ten Conference titles and a national championship in 2023. He also won the Lott Trophy and was a two-time All-Big Ten selection. Colson was selected by the Chargers in the third round of the 2024 NFL draft.

== Early life ==
Colson was born in Mirebalais, Haiti. His father died when he was seven years old, and he was placed in an orphanage in Port-au-Prince operated by his uncle. At age eight, he met Americans Steve and Melanie Colson who visited Haiti on a church mission after the 2010 Haiti earthquake. He was adopted by the Colsons and, after a lengthy adoption and immigration process, moved to Tennessee at age nine in May 2012. He recalled that, on arriving at the airport in the United States, "The first thing I saw in America was a Michigan hat. That's what all of my family members were wearing, they're big Michigan fans."

Colson grew up speaking Haitian Creole and learned English only after moving to Tennessee. He also grew up playing soccer and took up American football, playing linebacker at Ravenwood High School in Brentwood, Tennessee.

Considered a four-star recruit by the 247Sports Composite rankings, Colson was rated as a top 100 player in the nation, the #10 overall linebacker, and the second best player in Tennessee in 2021. Colson met Michigan head coach Jim Harbaugh at a football camp and was offered a scholarship. He committed to play college football at the University of Michigan, over offers from LSU, Oklahoma, Ole Miss, Oregon and Tennessee.

== College career ==
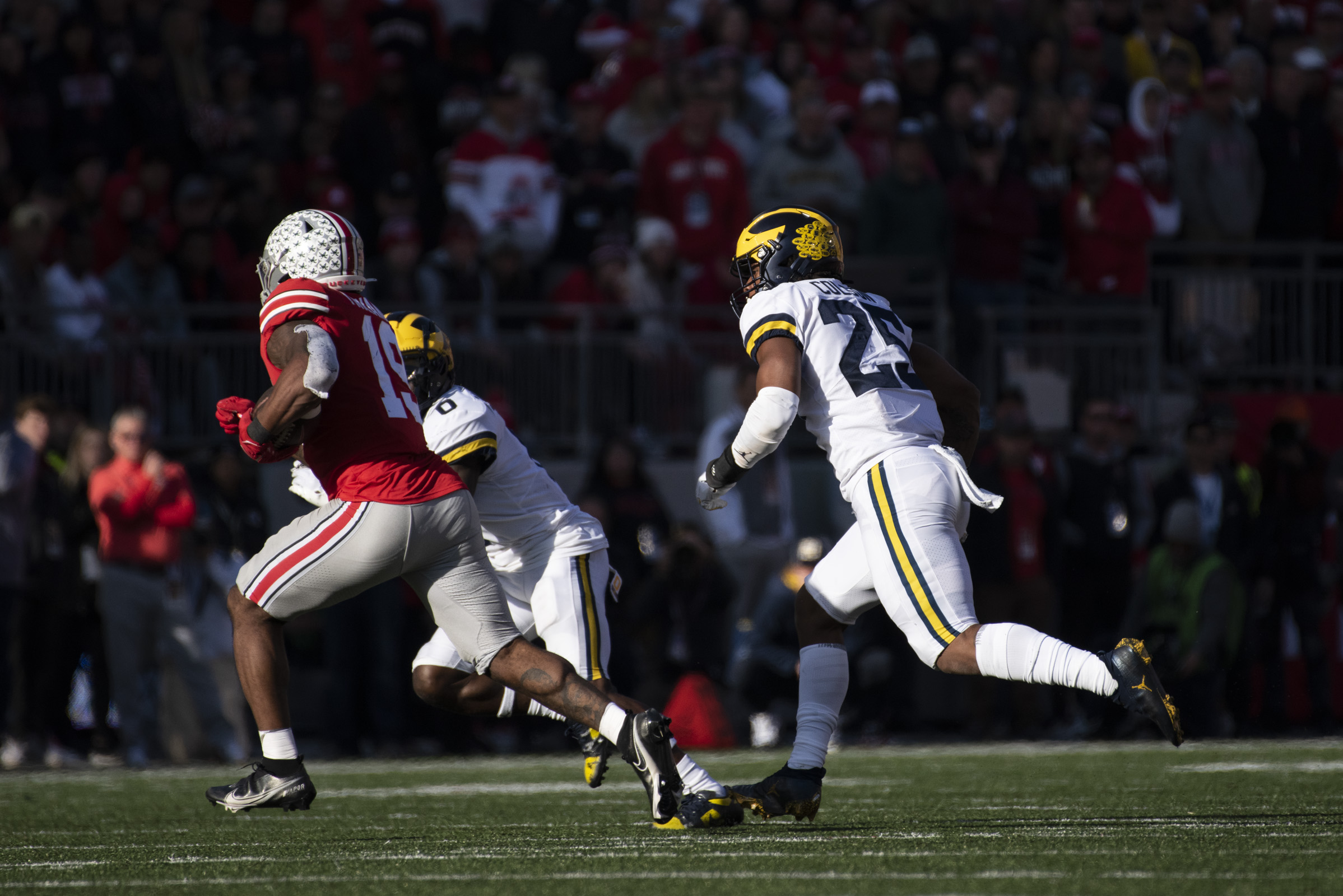
Colson (No. 25) versus Ohio State in 2022

Colson enrolled at the University of Michigan in 2021 and started seven games as a true freshman. He totaled 60 tackles (fourth most on the team), and earned his first career sack on November 13, 2021, in a 12 tackle performance versus Penn State. He was selected as a Freshman All-American.

As a sophomore, in 2022, Colson started all 14 games, recording a team high 101 tackles and 2 sacks. He was voted second team All-Big Ten by the coaches. In the Big Ten Championship Game victory versus Purdue, Colson recorded a career high 15 tackles.

As a junior, in 2023, Colson started all 15 games and led the Michigan Wolverines to a national championship with a team high 95 tackles. Colson was named Second-team All-Big Ten by both the coaches and media. He also won the Lott IMPACT Trophy.

== Professional career ==
Pre-draft measurables
Height	Weight	Arm length	Hand span	Wingspan
6 ft 2 1/4 in (1.89 m)	238 lb (108 kg)	32 1/2 in (0.83 m)	9 3/8 in (0.24 m)	6 ft 5 1/2 in (1.97 m)
All values from NFL Combine

Colson was selected 69th overall by the Los Angeles Chargers in the third round of the 2024 NFL draft. He made 11 appearances (one start) for Los Angeles during his rookie season, recording one pass deflection and 29 combined tackles.

On August 26, 2025, Colson was placed on injured reserve after undergoing season-ending shoulder surgery.

On August 30, 2026, Colson was waived by the Chargers as a part of final roster cuts; he was re-signed to the team's practice squad the following day.
