= M Club banner =

Tradition at University of Michigan football games

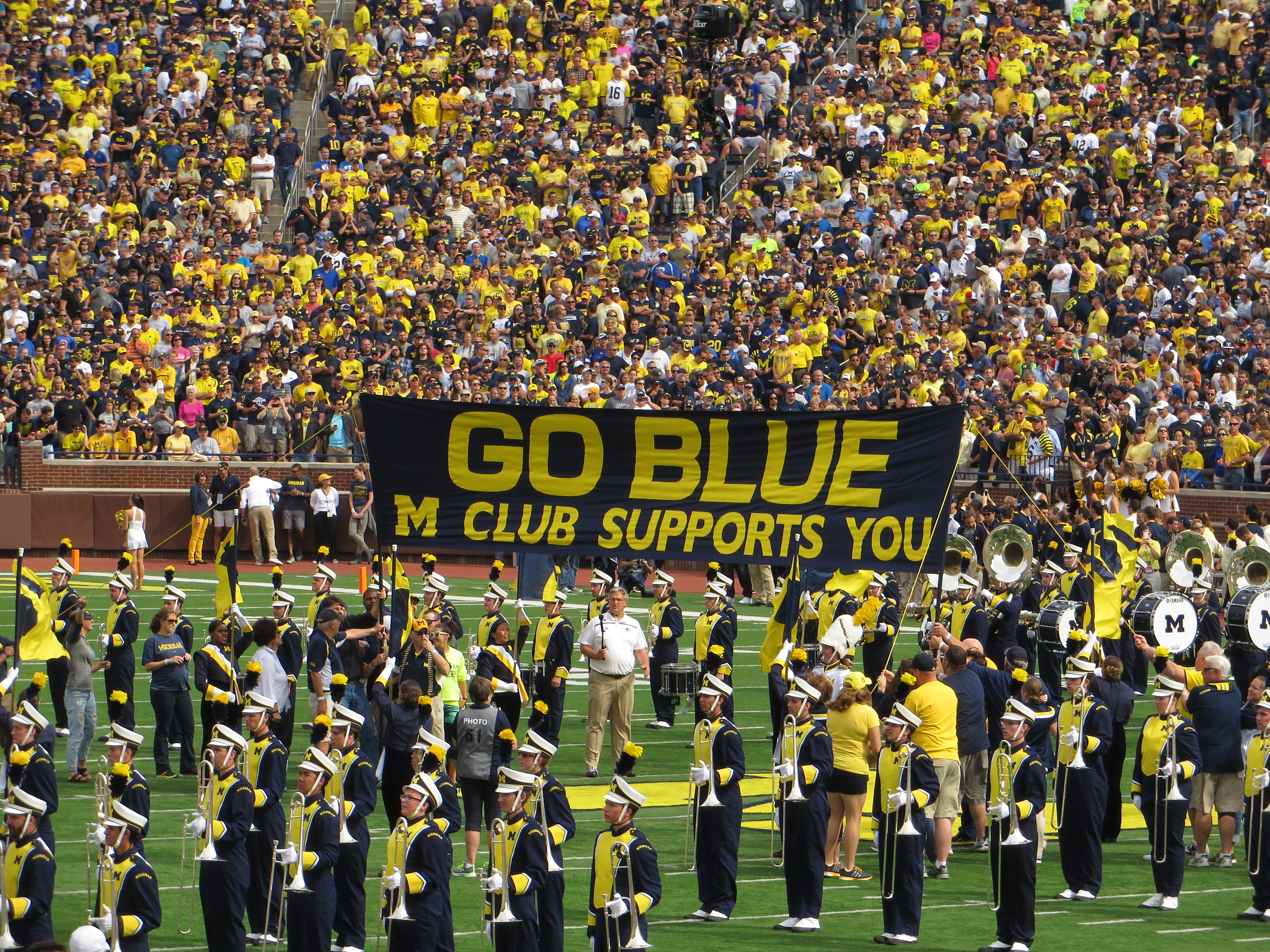
M Club banner, September 2015

The M Club banner is a tradition at University of Michigan's football games. The tradition, started in 1962, is for the Michigan Wolverines football players to leap and touch a maize-and-blue banner as they run onto the field before home games.

== Touching the banner ==
The banner, reading "Go Blue: M Club Supports You", is raised at midfield before every Michigan home game. Michigan players run from the Michigan Stadium tunnel as the Michigan Marching Band plays "The Victors". As the players approach the banner, they leap to touch it.

Fox College Football in 2021 ran a feature on the banner, calling it "one of the defining images in college football." Adam Rittenberg of ESPN.com described the tradition as follows: "It's an iconic entrance at an iconic stadium to the tune of an iconic fight song. If you haven't seen Michigan touch the banner at Michigan Stadium, you haven't been paying attention."

The current version of the banner measures 30 by 4 feet (9.1 by 1.2 m). The banner has been redesigned over the years with slight changes in the school's color scheme. New England Flag and Banner have made the banners in recent years. Between games, the banner is stored at an undisclosed location in Michigan's basketball home of Crisler Center.

== History ==
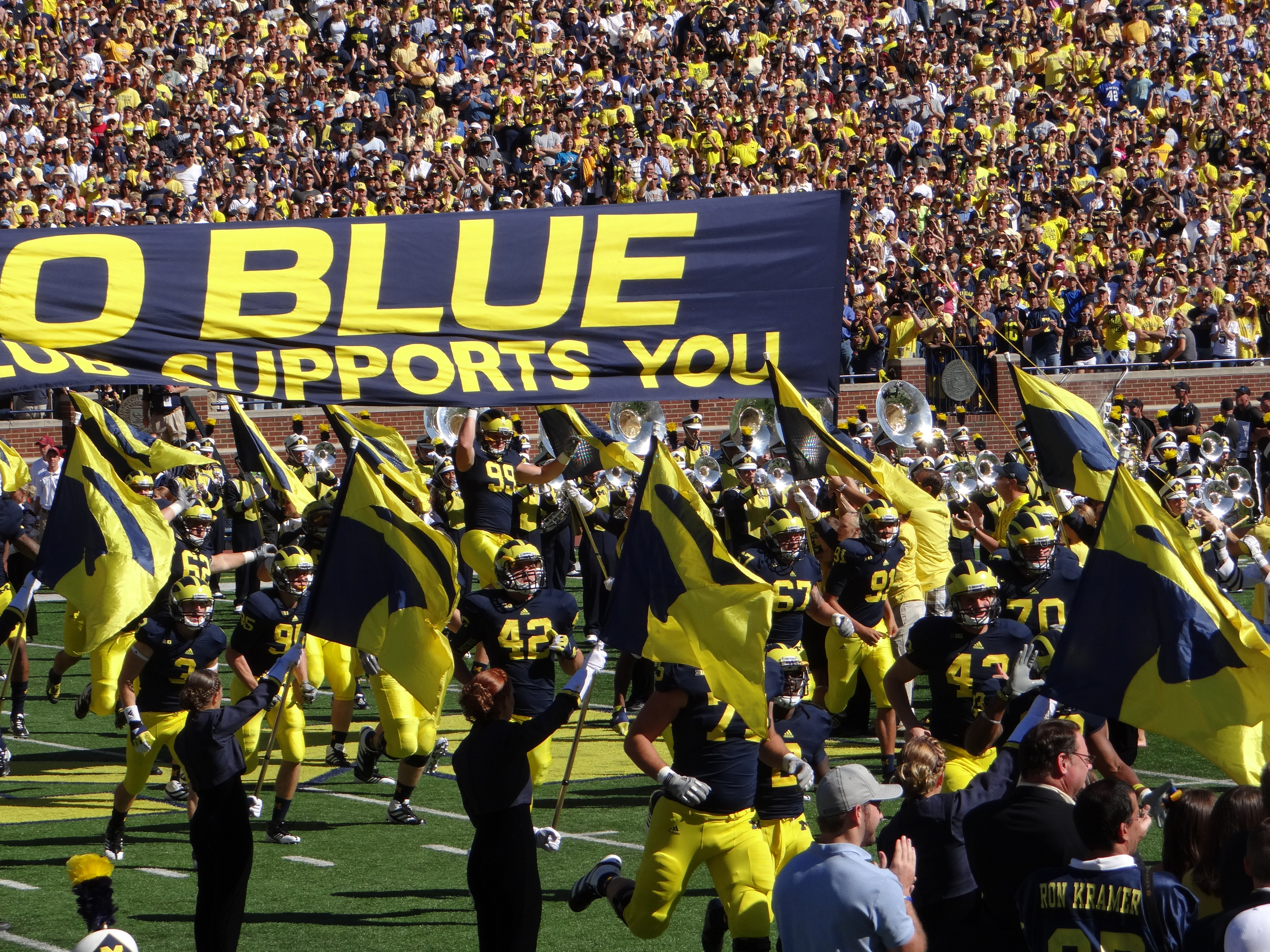
Matthew Godin (No. 99) touches the banner, 2012

The tradition began in 1962 when Michigan began the season with a 1–5 record. Before the Illinois game on November 10, the M Club received permission from head coach Bump Elliott to have the school's varsity letter winners in other sports line up in two rows on the field, welcoming the football team as it ran onto the field. Michigan defeated Illinois, and the tradition began. According to another account, Michigan hockey coach Al Renfrew asked his wife, Marguerite, to make two banners to drape over the football locker room. She made the banners by hand with help from the school's engineering dean, Bob Hosington, in designing the Block M. The banners were initially hung in the locker room and then moved to the tunnel. After each game, the Renfrews brought the banners home, where they were hung during the week.

During The Ten Year War, the M Club banner was the focus of two incidents involving the Ohio State Buckeyes. In 1973, the Ohio State players ran onto the field first and, led by Outland Trophy winner John Hicks, unsuccessfully attempted to destroy the banner. Four years later, Woody Hayes and the 1977 Ohio State team ran under the banner. Former Michigan All-American Dave Gallagher and Michigan's undergraduate "M" men representing other sports sought to physically block and tackle the Ohio State players from passing under the banner.

On September 10, 2022, at a game in which a thunderstorm delayed the kickoff until 9:01 p.m., the tradition was not followed for the first time in some 60 years.
