= DJ Turner (cornerback) =

American football player (born 2000)

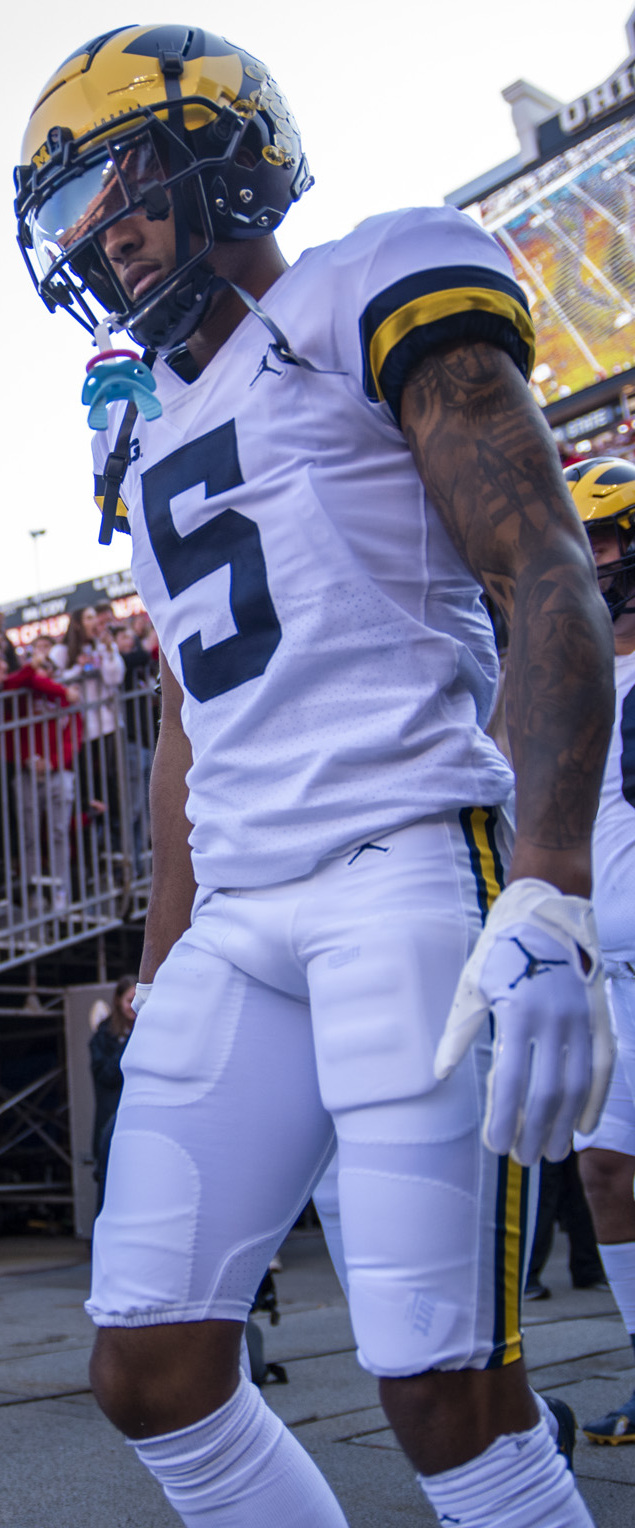
- Turner with the Michigan Wolverines in 2022

No. 0 – Cincinnati Bengals
- Position: Cornerback
- Roster status: Active

Personal information
- Born: November 9, 2000 (age 26); Suwanee, Georgia, U.S.
- Listed height: 5 ft 11 in (1.80 m)
- Listed weight: 185 lb (84 kg)

Career information
- High school: IMG Academy (Bradenton, Florida)
- College: Michigan (2019–2022)
- NFL draft: 2023: 2nd round, 60th overall pick

Career history
- Cincinnati Bengals (2023–present)

Awards and highlights
- Second-team All-Big Ten (2022)

Career NFL statistics as of Week 7, 2026
- Total tackles: 133
- Sacks: 1.0
- Forced fumbles: 2
- Fumble recoveries: 2
- Pass deflections: 38
- Interceptions: 2
- Stats at Pro Football Reference

JuanDrago Labron "DJ" Turner II (born November 9, 2000) is an American professional football cornerback for the Cincinnati Bengals of the National Football League (NFL). He played college football for the Michigan Wolverines and was selected by the Bengals in the second round of the 2023 NFL draft.

== Early life ==
Turner was born on November 9, 2000, in Suwanee, Georgia. He attended North Gwinnett High School before transferring to IMG Academy in Bradenton, Florida, for his senior year. He committed to the University of Michigan to play college football.

== College career ==
Turner appeared in eight total games his first two years at Michigan in 2019 and 2020. In 2021, he played in all 14 games and made eight starts. He finished the year with 33 tackles, two interceptions and one touchdown. Turner returned as a starter in 2022, intercepting one pass and returning a fumble 45 yards for a touchdown.

== Professional career ==
Pre-draft measurables
Height	Weight	Arm length	Hand span	Wingspan	40-yard dash	10-yard split	20-yard split	Vertical jump	Broad jump
5 ft 11 1/4 in (1.81 m)	178 lb (81 kg)	30 3/4 in (0.78 m)	9 5/8 in (0.24 m)	6 ft 1 3/8 in (1.86 m)	4.26 s	1.47 s	2.32 s	38.5 in (0.98 m)	10 ft 11 in (3.33 m)
All values from the NFL Combine

Turner was selected by the Cincinnati Bengals in the second round, 60th overall, of the 2023 NFL draft.

=== 2023 ===
In Week 5 against the Arizona Cardinals, Bengals' starting cornerback Chidobe Awuzie was ruled out with a back injury, leading to Turner getting his first career start. Turner would finish the game with four total tackles and one pass deflection, grading the highest of all the Bengals' cornerbacks in the 34–20 win. He recorded his first sack in the Bengals' Week 10 contest against the Baltimore Ravens, and recovered a fumble the following week against the Pittsburgh Steelers, with a 28 yard return. Turner finished his rookie season with 50 tackles, a sack, a fumble recovery, and seven pass deflections.

=== 2024 ===
Despite starting 12 games as a rookie, Turner was named the Bengals' second string cornerback to begin the season, backing up Daxton Hill to begin the 2024 campaign. Hill would go out with a season ending knee injury during the Bengals' Week 5 game against the Baltimore Ravens, thrusting Turner back into the starting role. Turner suffered a broken clavicle in Week 11 and was placed on injured reserve on November 19.

=== 2025 ===
Turner started 16 of 17 regular season games and recorded 18 passes defensed, two interceptions and two forced fumbles. His 18 passes defensed was tied for third in the NFL.

== NFL career statistics ==
Legend
**Bold**	Career high

=== Regular season ===
Year	Team	Games		Tackles					Interceptions						Fumbles				
Year	Team	GP	GS	Cmb	Solo	Ast	Sck	TFL	Int	Yds	Avg	Lng	TD	PD	FF	Fum	FR	Yds	TD
2023	CIN	17	12	**50**	**40**	10	**1.0**	**2**	0	0	0.0	0	0	7	0	0	**1**	**28**	0
2024	CIN	11	6	29	24	5	0.0	1	0	0	0.0	0	0	8	0	0	0	0	0
2025	CIN	17	16	40	28	**12**	0.0	**2**	**2**	**7**	**3.5**	**7**	0	**18**	**2**	0	**1**	7	0
Career		45	34	119	92	27	1.0	5	2	7	3.5	7	0	33	2	0	2	35	0
