= Mike Elston (American football coach) =

American football player and coach (born 1974)

Los Angeles Chargers
- Title: Run game coordinator & defensive line coach

Personal information
- Born: November 1, 1974 (age 52); St. Marys, Ohio, U.S.

Career information
- Position: Linebacker
- College: Michigan (1993–1996)

Career history
- Michigan (1997) Student assistant; Michigan (1998) Intern; Michigan (1999–2000) Graduate assistant; Eastern Michigan (2001) Defensive ends coach; Eastern Michigan (2002–2003) Defensive line coach & recruiting coordinator; Central Michigan (2004) Defensive line coach; Central Michigan (2005) Co-defensive coordinator & defensive line coach; Central Michigan (2006) Special teams coordinator & linebackers coach; Cincinnati (2007–2008) Special teams coordinator, tight ends coach, & recruiting coordinator; Cincinnati (2009) Assistant head coach, special teams coordinator, & defensive line coach; Notre Dame (2010) Special teams coordinator & defensive line coach; Notre Dame (2011–2014) Defensive line coach; Notre Dame (2015–2016) Linebackers coach & recruiting coordinator; Notre Dame (2017) Defensive line coach & recruiting coordinator; Notre Dame (2018–2021) Assistant head coach & defensive line coach; Michigan (2022–2023) Defensive line coach & recruiting coordinator; Los Angeles Chargers (2024–2025) Defensive line coach; Los Angeles Chargers (2026–present) Run game coordinator & defensive line coach

Awards and highlights
- CFP national champion (2023)

Mike Elston (born November 1, 1974) is an American football coach and former player who is currently the defensive line coach for the Los Angeles Chargers of the National Football League (NFL). Elston was the defensive line coach for the University of Michigan.

== Coaching career ==
After his playing career as an outside linebacker at Michigan, Elston began his coaching career at his alma mater, the University of Michigan. Elston began his coaching career as a student assistant coach during the 1997 season. In 1998, Elston stepped into a video internship role. He then began assisting with the development of outside linebackers as a graduate assistant during the 1999 and 2000 seasons.

=== Eastern Michigan ===
Elston left his alma mater to become the defensive ends coach at Eastern Michigan University in 2001. In 2002, Elston became the defensive line coach and acted as a recruiting coordinator in 2002 and 2003.

=== Central Michigan ===
In 2004, Elston left Eastern Michigan and joined the Central Michigan University coaching staff to become the defensive line coach. In 2005, he was elevated to co-defensive coordinator and continued his defensive line coaching responsibilities. In 2006, Elston became the special teams coordinator and linebackers coach.

=== Cincinnati ===
In 2007, Elston left Central Michigan and joined the University of Cincinnati coaching staff to serve as a recruiting coordinator, special teams coordinator, and tight ends coach. In 2009, he was promoted to assistant head coach and moved to coach the defensive line and serve as the special teams coordinator.

=== Notre Dame ===
Elston left the University of Cincinnati and was hired by the University of Notre Dame in 2010 to serve as the special teams coordinator and defensive line coach. From 2012 to 2018, Elston held many positions while on the Notre Dame football staff that ranged from special teams coordinator and position coaching roles. On January 10, 2018, Elston was promoted to associate head coach and defensive line coach of the Notre Dame football program.

=== Michigan ===
In 2022, he decided to join Jim Harbaugh at his alma mater, Michigan as the defensive line coach and recruiting coordinator. He helped lead the Wolverines to a CFP National Championship in 2023.

=== Los Angeles Chargers ===
On February 6, 2024, Elston decided to leave Michigan and join the Los Angeles Chargers football staff with Jim Harbaugh which would be his first position in the National Football League.

On May 22, 2026, Elston added the role of defensive run game coordinator to his title.
