= Mike Morris (defensive end) =

American football player (born 2001)

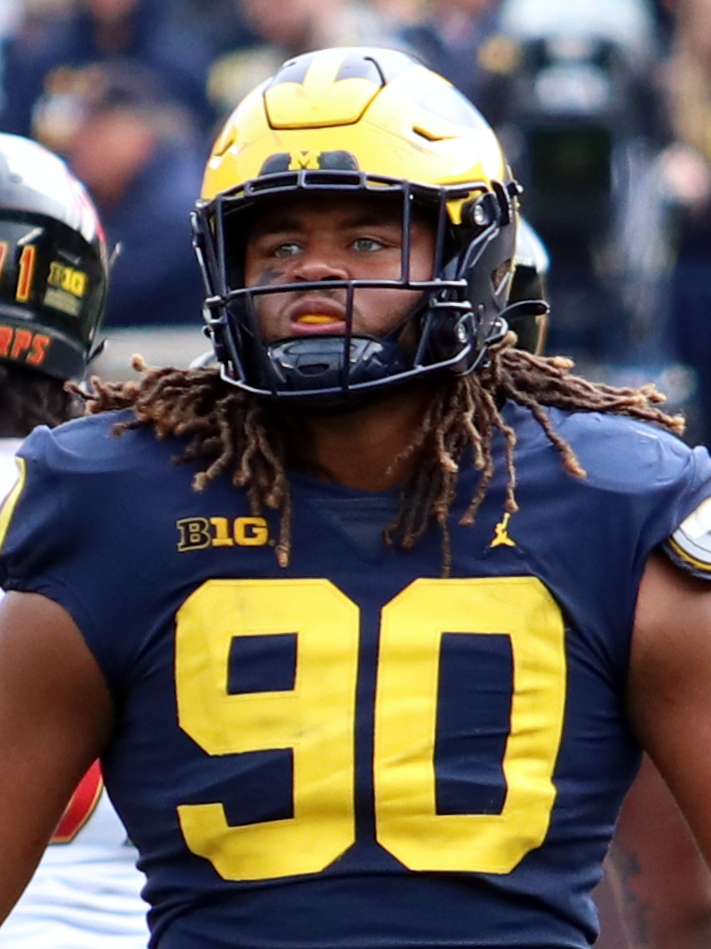
- Morris with Michigan in 2022

No. 94 – Seattle Seahawks
- Position: Defensive end
- Roster status: Active

Personal information
- Born: April 22, 2001 (age 25); Belle Glade, Florida, U.S.
- Listed height: 6 ft 6 in (1.98 m)
- Listed weight: 306 lb (139 kg)

Career information
- High school: American Heritage (Delray Beach, Florida)
- College: Michigan (2019–2022)
- NFL draft: 2023: 5th round, 151st overall pick

Career history
- Seattle Seahawks (2023–present)

Awards and highlights
- Super Bowl champion (LX); Second-team All-American (2022); Big Ten Defensive Lineman of the Year (2022); First-team All-Big Ten (2022)

Career NFL statistics as of 2025
- Total tackles: 26
- Pass deflections: 1
- Stats at Pro Football Reference

Michael Morris Jr. (born April 22, 2001) is an American professional football defensive end for the Seattle Seahawks of the National Football League (NFL). He was an All-American playing college football for the Michigan Wolverines and was selected by the Seahawks in the 2023 NFL draft.

== College career ==
Morris attended American Heritage School in Florida. He originally committed to Florida State University to play college football before switching to the University of Michigan.

Morris played in only one game his first two years at Michigan in 2019 and 2020. In 2021, he appeared in 14 games and made four starts, recording 16 tackles, 0.5 sacks and one interception. He became a full-time starter in 2022.

== Professional career ==
Pre-draft measurables
Height	Weight	Arm length	Hand span	Wingspan	40-yard dash	10-yard split	20-yard split	20-yard shuttle	Three-cone drill	Vertical jump	Broad jump	Bench press
6 ft 5 1/8 in (1.96 m)	275 lb (125 kg)	33 1/2 in (0.85 m)	10 in (0.25 m)	6 ft 9 7/8 in (2.08 m)	4.95 s	1.72 s	2.82 s	4.65 s	7.46 s	28.5 in (0.72 m)	9 ft 2 in (2.79 m)	22 reps
All values from NFL Combine/Pro Day

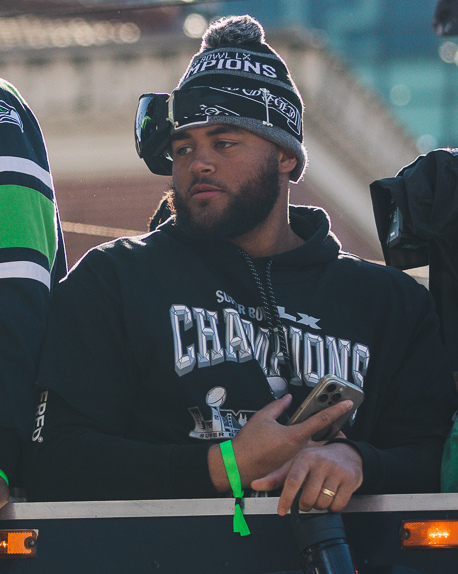
Morris at the Super Bowl LX parade

Morris was drafted by the Seattle Seahawks in the fifth round, 151st overall, in the 2023 NFL draft. He was placed on injured reserve on September 20, 2023, with a shoulder injury.
