= Makari Paige =

American football player (born 2002)

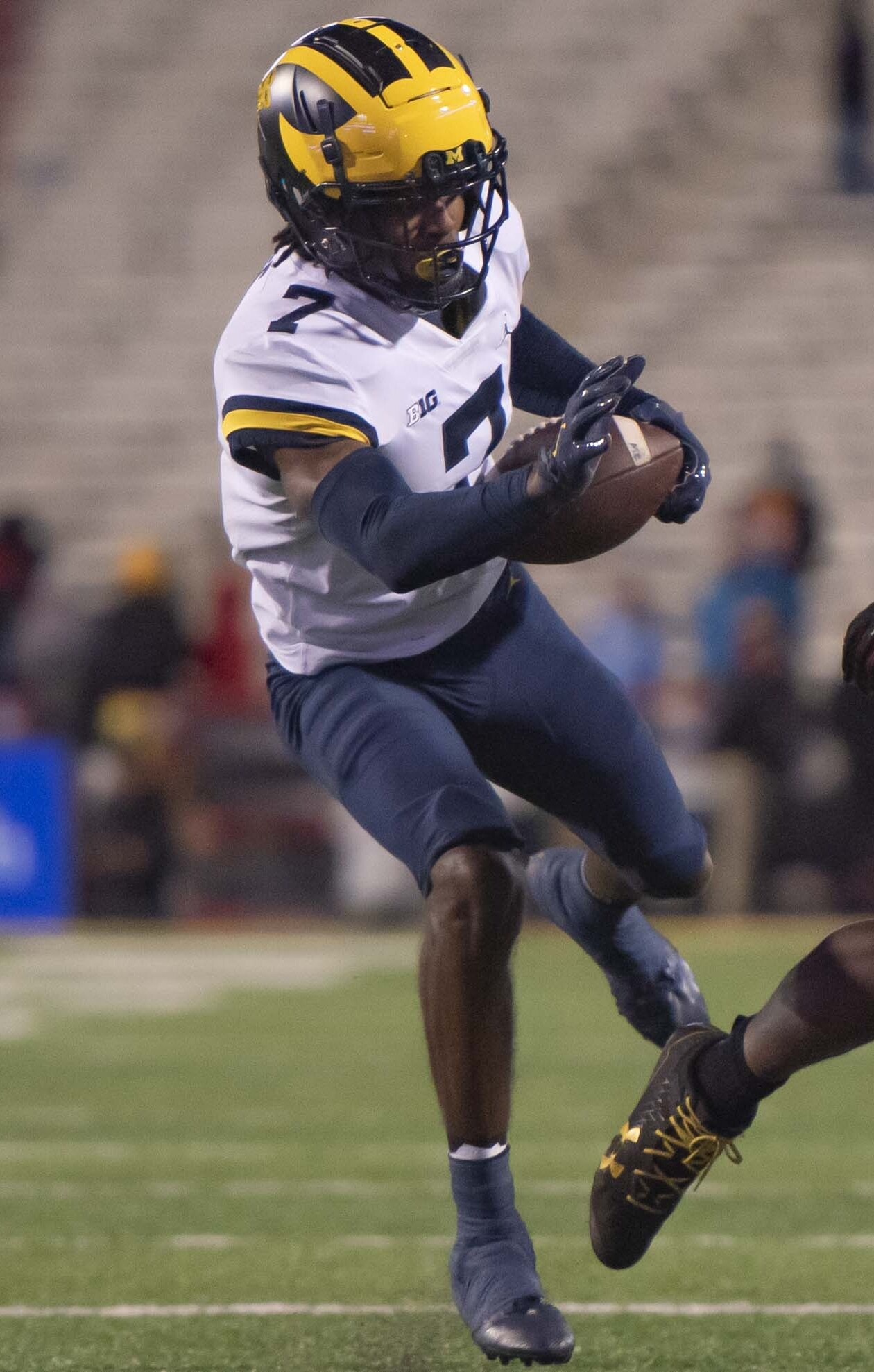
- Paige with the Michigan Wolverines in 2021

Profile
- Position: Safety

Personal information
- Born: January 11, 2002 (age 24)
- Listed height: 6 ft 4 in (1.93 m)
- Listed weight: 208 lb (94 kg)

Career information
- High school: West Bloomfield (MI)
- College: Michigan (2020–2024)
- NFL draft: 2025: undrafted

Career history
- New York Giants (2025)*; Pittsburgh Steelers (2026)*
- * Offseason or practice squad member only

Awards and highlights
- CFP national champion (2023)
- Stats at Pro Football Reference

Makari Jaimon Paige (born January 11, 2002) is an American professional football safety. He played college football for the Michigan Wolverines, winning three consecutive Big Ten Conference titles and a national championship in 2023.

== Early life ==
Paige was born on January 11, 2002, the son of Glen and Lajuanna Paige. He attended West Bloomfield High School in West Bloomfield, Michigan, where he played football under future Michigan assistant coach, Ronald Bellamy, and was teammates with Donovan Edwards and Semaj Morgan.

During his junior and senior seasons, 2018 and 2019, Paige totaled 198 tackles, four interceptions and 11 pass breakups. As a senior, he was named All-State and to the Detroit Free Press: Dream Team.

Paige was one of the top rated safeties in the class of 2020, rated as a four-star recruit with offers from Michigan, Notre Dame, Ohio State, Penn State, Purdue and Kentucky. On July 30, 2019, Paige committed to in-state school, the University of Michigan.

== College career ==
=== Freshman, sophomore and junior seasons (2020–2022) ===
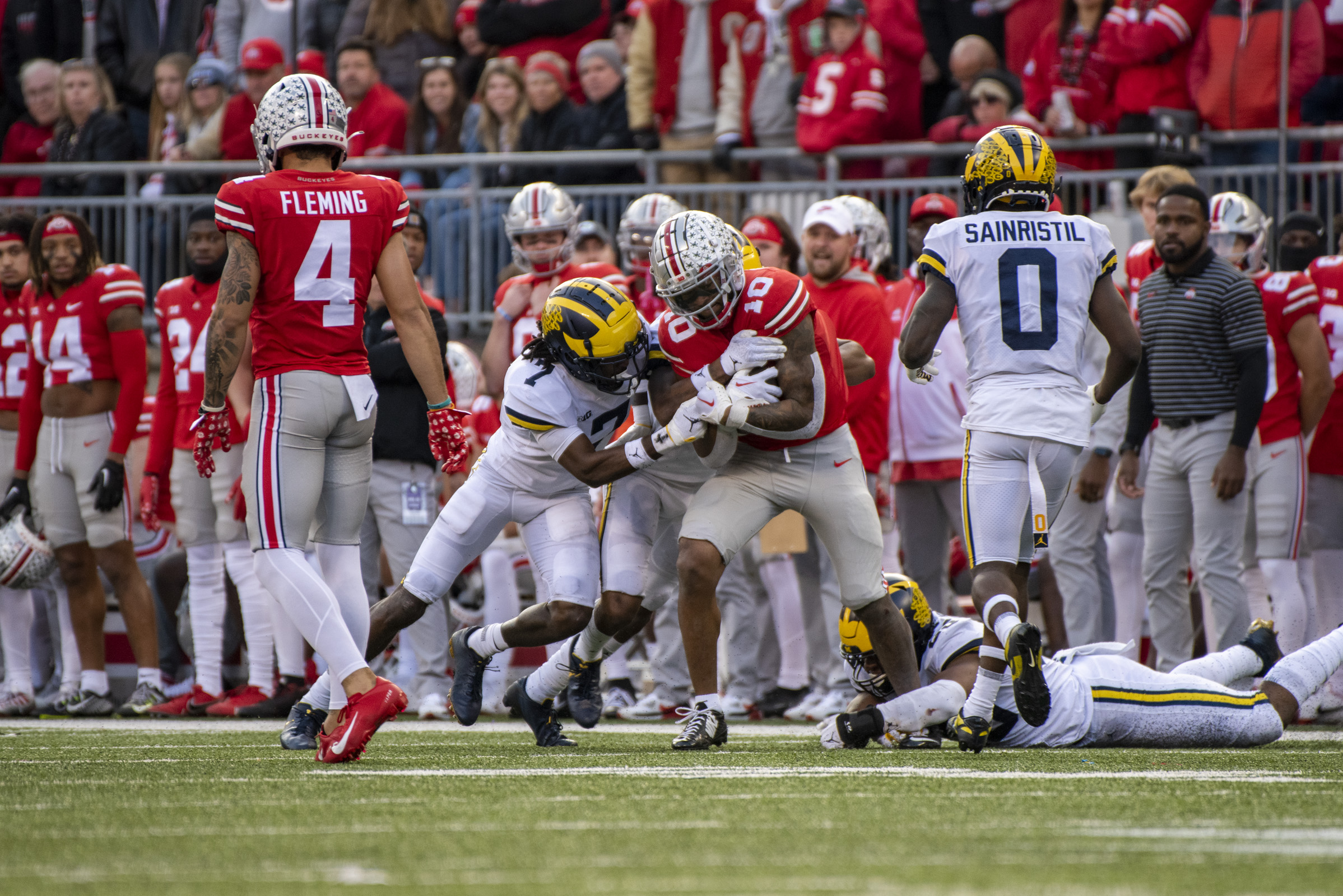
Paige (No. 7) in the 45–23 victory versus Ohio State in 2022

Paige committed to the University of Michigan in July 2019, and enrolled early in January 2020. As a freshman, during the COVID-shortened 2020 season, he appeared in all six games for Michigan, totaling six tackles on the season. In 2021, as a sophomore he appeared in nine games, contributing on special teams and playing safety on defense in a reserve role.

In 2022, Paige overtook RJ Moten in the middle of his junior season to earn the starting safety position. Paige started five games for the Wolverines, appearing in twelve games on the season and finishing with 41 tackles, one interception and one sack.

=== Senior season(s) (2023–2024) ===
Prior to the 2023 season, Paige was rated by Pro Football Focus (PFF) at No. 7 among the returning safeties in college football. PFF also rated him as the second-highest graded defender on the Michigan team.

In 2023, Paige started 13 games for the Wolverines, appearing in 14. He again totaled 41 tackles, including a forced fumble. Paige helped lead Michigan to a third consecutive Big Ten conference title and a national championship. Following the season, Paige announced he would return for a fifth year in 2024. He was named All-Big Ten honorable mention in 2022 and 2023.

In 2024, Paige was voted as a team captain for his fifth season at Michigan. In week three versus Arkansas State, Paige recorded two tackles and his first interception of the season; the second of his career. In the last week of the season against Ohio State, Paige had three tackles and an interception, leading Michigan to a 13-10 win over their arch-rival. He finished his career 4-0 against the Ohio State Buckeyes. He ended the season with 45 tackles and two interceptions.

Paige opted out of his final bowl game. In his five years at the University of Michigan, Paige won 49 games with the Wolverines, three Big Ten championships, started 30 times in the secondary, and was a national champion. In total, Paige amassed 135 tackles, three interceptions, one sack and one fumble recovery.

== Professional career ==
Pre-draft measurables
Height	Weight	Arm length	Hand span	40-yard dash	10-yard split	20-yard split	20-yard shuttle	Vertical jump	Broad jump	Bench press
6 ft 3 in (1.91 m)	197 lb (89 kg)	32 1/2 in (0.83 m)	10 1/2 in (0.27 m)	4.52 s	1.62 s	2.59 s	4.46 s	32.5 in (0.83 m)	10 ft 0 in (3.05 m)	15 reps
All values from Pro Day

=== New York Giants ===
On April 26, 2025, Paige signed with the New York Giants as an undrafted free agent. He was waived by the Giants on August 26 as a part of final roster cuts.

=== Pittsburgh Steelers ===
On May 13, 2026, Paige signed with the Pittsburgh Steelers on a one-year contract. He was released by the Steelers on June 2.
