= 2024 Michigan Wolverines football team =

American college football season

2024 Michigan Wolverines football

ReliaQuest Bowl champion

ReliaQuest Bowl, W 19–13 vs. Alabama
- Conference: Big Ten Conference
- Record: 8–5 (5–4 Big Ten)
- Head coach: Sherrone Moore (1st season)
- Offensive coordinator: Kirk Campbell (1st season; fired Dec. 3); Steve Casula (interim: bowl game)
- Offensive scheme: Pro spread
- Defensive coordinator: Don Martindale (1st season)
- Base defense: 4–2–5
- MVPs: Mason Graham; Kalel Mullings
- Captains: Max Bredeson; Donovan Edwards; Rod Moore; Makari Paige; Josaiah Stewart
- Home stadium: Michigan Stadium

Uniform
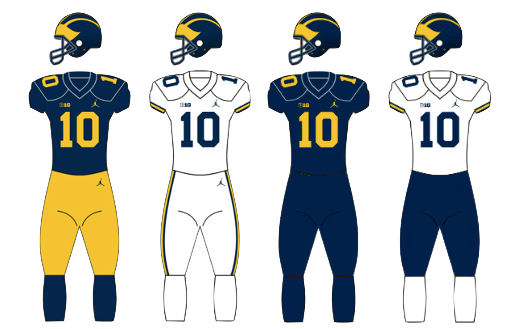

2024 Big Ten Conference football standings
	Conf.			Overall
Team	W		L	W		L
No. 3 Oregon y$^	9	–	0	13	–	1
No. 10 Indiana ^	8	–	1	11	–	2
No. 5 Penn State y^	8	–	1	13	–	3
No. 1 Ohio State #^	7	–	2	14	–	2
No. 16 Illinois	6	–	3	10	–	3
Iowa	6	–	3	8	–	5
Michigan	5	–	4	8	–	5
Minnesota	5	–	4	8	–	5
USC	4	–	5	7	–	6
Rutgers	4	–	5	7	–	6
Washington	4	–	5	6	–	7
Nebraska	3	–	6	7	–	6
UCLA	3	–	6	5	–	7
Wisconsin	3	–	6	5	–	7
Northwestern	2	–	7	4	–	8
Maryland	1	–	8	4	–	8
Michigan State†	0	–	6	0	–	7
Purdue	0	–	9	1	–	11
Championship: Oregon 45, Penn State 37
# – College Football Playoff champion; ^ – College Football Playoff participant; $ – Conference champion; y – Championship game participant; † — NCAA vacated all wins for Michigan State (5–7, 3–6); Rankings from AP Poll

The 2024 Michigan Wolverines football team was an American football team that represented the University of Michigan in the Big Ten Conference during the 2024 NCAA Division I FBS football season. In the Wolverines' first year under head coach Sherrone Moore, they compiled an 8–5 record (5–4 in conference games), outscored opponents by a total of 286 to 259, and finished in a tie for seventh place in the Big Ten standings.

After starting the season 4–1, with a sole loss to No. 3 Texas, Michigan fell to 5–5, despite a rivalry win against Michigan State. Michigan won its final two regular season games, including a 13–10 upset victory against rival No. 2 Ohio State at Ohio Stadium, despite entering the game as 20.5 point underdogs. It marked the fourth consecutive win against the Buckeyes, the longest streak for the Wolverines since 1988 to 1991, and the largest upset in the series history.

The Wolverines concluded their season with a 19–13 upset victory over No. 11 Alabama in the ReliaQuest Bowl. Michigan became the only program in college football history to beat Alabama twice in the same calendar year, and the first Michigan team since 1978 to win back-to-back games as double digit underdogs.

The team's statistical leaders included quarterback Davis Warren with 1,199 passing yards, running back Kalel Mullings with 948 rushing yards, tight end Colston Loveland with 56 receptions for 582 yards, placekicker Dominic Zvada with 89 points scored (21 field goals, 26 extra points), defensive end Josaiah Stewart with 8.5 sacks and 13 tackles for a loss, and linebacker Ernest Hausmann with 89 total tackles. Defensive tackle Mason Graham was a unanimous first-team selection on the 2024 All-America college football team. Zvada was selected as a first-team All-American and was also honored as the Big Ten Kicker of the Year.

== Schedule ==
Date	Time	Opponent	Rank	Site	TV	Result	Attendance	Source
August 31	7:30 p.m.	Fresno State*	No. 9	Michigan Stadium; Ann Arbor, MI	NBC	W 30–10	110,665	
September 7	12:00 p.m.	No. 3 Texas*	No. 10	Michigan Stadium; Ann Arbor, MI (Big Noon Kickoff, College GameDay)	Fox	L 12–31	111,170	
September 14	12:00 p.m.	Arkansas State*^{†}	No. 17	Michigan Stadium; Ann Arbor, MI	BTN	W 28–18	110,250	
September 21	3:30 p.m.	No. 11 USC	No. 18	Michigan Stadium; Ann Arbor, MI	CBS	W 27–24	110,702	
September 28	12:00 p.m.	Minnesota	No. 12	Michigan Stadium; Ann Arbor, MI (Little Brown Jug)	Fox	W 27–24	110,340	
October 5	7:30 p.m.	at Washington	No. 10	Husky Stadium; Seattle, WA	NBC	L 17–27	72,132	
October 19	3:30 p.m.	at No. 22 Illinois	No. 24	Memorial Stadium; Champaign, IL (rivalry)	CBS	L 7–21	60,670	
October 26	7:30 p.m.	Michigan State		Michigan Stadium; Ann Arbor, MI (rivalry)	BTN	W 24–17	110,849	
November 2	3:30 p.m.	No. 1 Oregon		Michigan Stadium; Ann Arbor, MI	CBS	L 17–38	110,576	
November 9	3:30 p.m.	at No. 8 Indiana		Memorial Stadium; Bloomington, IN	CBS	L 15–20	53,082	
November 23	3:30 p.m.	Northwestern		Michigan Stadium; Ann Arbor, MI (George Jewett Trophy)	FS1	W 50–6	109,830	
November 30	12:00 p.m.	at No. 2 Ohio State		Ohio Stadium; Columbus, OH (rivalry, Big Noon Kickoff)	Fox	W 13–10	106,005	
December 31	12:00 p.m.	vs. No. 11 Alabama*		Raymond James Stadium; Tampa, FL (ReliaQuest Bowl)	ESPN	W 19–13	51,439	
*Non-conference game; ^{†}Homecoming; Rankings from AP Poll released prior to the game; All times are in Eastern time

== Rankings ==
Ranking movements Legend: ██ Increase in ranking ██ Decrease in ranking — = Not ranked RV = Received votes ( ) = First-place votes
	Week																
Poll	Pre	1	2	3	4	5	6	7	8	9	10	11	12	13	14	15	Final
AP	9	10	17	18	12	10	24	24	—	—	—	—	—	—	RV	—	RV
Coaches	8 (1)	9	16	17	12	10	21	22	—	RV	—	—	—	—	RV	—	RV
CFP	Not released										—	—	—	—	—	—	Not released

== Game summaries ==
=== vs Fresno State ===
Fresno State Bulldogs (0–0) vs No. 9 Michigan Wolverines (0–0) – Game summary

Quarter	1	2	3	4	Total
Bulldogs	0	3	0	7	10
No. 9 Wolverines	7	3	3	17	30

at Michigan Stadium • Ann Arbor, Michigan

- Date: August 31
- Game time: 7:30 p.m. ET
- Game weather: 72 °F (22 °C), sunny, NE 5 miles per hour (8.0 km/h)
- Game attendance: 110,665
- Referee: Jeff Servinski
- TV announcers (NBC): Noah Eagle (play-by-play), Todd Blackledge (color commentator), and Kathryn Tappen (sideline reporter)

Game information

First quarter

- (11:03) MICH – Donovan Edwards 3-yard pass from Alex Orji, Dominic Zvada kick (Drive: 5 plays, 31 yards, 2:28; Michigan 7–0)

Second quarter

- (7:35) FRES – Dylan Lynch 41-yard field goal (Drive: 8 plays, 38 yards, 3:23; Michigan 7–3)
- (0:31) MICH – Dominic Zvada 45-yard field goal (Drive: 11 plays, 47 yards, 6:56; Michigan 10–3)

Third quarter

- (9:21) MICH – Dominic Zvada 53-yard field goal (Drive: 10 plays, 38 yards, 5:32; Michigan 13–3)

Fourth quarter

- (12:42) MICH – Dominic Zvada 55-yard field goal (Drive: 9 plays, 26 yards, 3:28; Michigan 16–3)
- (10:06) FRES – Raylen Sharpe 19-yard pass from Mikey Keene, Dylan Lynch kick (Drive: 7 plays, 75 yards, 2:36; Michigan 16–10)
- (5:43) MICH – Colston Loveland 18-yard pass from Davis Warren, Dominic Zvada kick (Drive: 7 plays, 75 yards, 4:17; Michigan 23–10)
- (3:57) MICH – Will Johnson 86-yard interception return, Dominic Zvada kick (Michigan 30–10)

Michigan opened the season before a crowd of 110,665 at Michigan Stadium, against the Fresno State Bulldogs. Michigan opened the scoring in the first quarter via a three-yard touchdown pass from Alex Orji to Donovan Edwards. The teams exchanged field goals in the second quarter, first a 41-yard field goal by Dylan Lynch for Fresno State, then a 45-yard field goal by Dominic Zvada for Michigan. Michigan led, 10–3, at halftime. Michigan scored the only points of the third quarter via a 53-yard field goal by Zvada. Michigan extended their lead in the fourth quarter via a 55-yard field goal by Zvada. The teams then exchanged touchdowns, first a 16-yard touchdown pass from Mikey Keene to Raylen Sharpe for Fresno State, then an 18-yard touchdown pass from Davis Warren to Colston Loveland for Michigan. Michigan scored the final points of the game via an 86-yard interception return by Will Johnson.

This was the first ever meeting between the two teams. Senior quarterback Davis Warren made his first start of his career, and completed 15 of 25 passes for 118 yards and a touchdown. Dominic Zvada's 55-yard field goal in the fourth quarter was the sixth-longest in program history. Defensively, Michigan held Fresno State to nine rushing yards, including -16 rushing yards in the second-half.

Statistics	FRES	MICH
First downs	18	18
Plays–yards	58–244	61–269
Rushes–yards	22–9	34–148
Passing yards	235	121
Passing: comp–att–int	22–36–2	16–27–1
Time of possession	26:00	34:00

Team	Category	Player	Statistics
Fresno State	Passing	Mikey Keene	22/36, 235 yards, 2 INT
Fresno State	Rushing	Malik Sherrod	14 carries, 24 yards
Fresno State	Receiving	Jalen Moss	6 receptions, 97 yards
Michigan	Passing	Davis Warren	15/25, 118 yards, 1 TD, 1 INT
Michigan	Rushing	Kalel Mullings	15 carries, 92 yards
Michigan	Receiving	Colston Loveland	8 receptions, 87 yards, 1 TD

=== vs No. 3 Texas ===
No. 3 Texas Longhorns (1–0) vs No. 10 Michigan Wolverines (1–0) – Game summary

Quarter	1	2	3	4	Total
No. 3 Longhorns	7	17	7	0	31
No. 10 Wolverines	0	3	3	6	12

at Michigan Stadium • Ann Arbor, Michigan

- Date: September 7
- Game time: 12:10 p.m. ET
- Game weather: 52 °F (11 °C), sunny, NW 12 miles per hour (19 km/h)
- Game attendance: 111,170
- Referee: Ron Snodgrass
- TV announcers (Fox): Gus Johnson (play-by-play), Joel Klatt (color commentator), and Jenny Taft (sideline reporter)

Game information

First quarter

- (4:04) TEX – Gunnar Helm 21-yard pass from Quinn Ewers, Bert Auburn kick (Drive: 6 plays, 56 yards, 3:06; Texas 7–0)

Second quarter

- (13:23) MICH – Dominic Zvada 37-yard field goal (Drive: 9 plays, 55 yards, 5:45; Texas 7–3)
- (8:24) TEX – Jerrick Gibson 7-yard run, Bert Auburn kick (Drive: 12 plays, 76 yards, 4:53; Texas 14–3)
- (2:40) TEX – Bert Auburn 26-yard field goal (Drive: 10 plays, 29 yards, 4:10; Texas 17–3)
- (0:10) TEX – Matthew Golden 5-yard pass from Quinn Ewers, Bert Auburn kick (Drive: 6 plays, 42 yards, 0:49; Texas 24–3)

Third quarter

- (5:28) MICH – Dominic Zvada 52-yard field goal (Drive: 9 plays, 41 yards, 4:22; Texas 24–6)
- (2:29) TEX – Jaydon Blue 7-yard pass from Quinn Ewers, Bert Auburn kick (Drive: 6 plays, 75 yards, 2:49; Texas 31–6)

Fourth quarter

- (1:54) MICH – Semaj Morgan 31-yard pass from Davis Warren, (Drive: 8 plays, 78 yards, 2:55; Texas 31–12)

In week 2, Michigan hosted the Texas Longhorns, before a crowd of 111,170. Texas opened the scoring in the first quarter via a 21-yard touchdown pass from Quinn Ewers to Gunnar Helm. Michigan finally got on the board in the second quarter via a 37-yard field goal by Dominic Zvada. Texas scored 17 points in the quarter via a seven-yard touchdown run by Jerrick Gibson, a 26-yard field goal by Bert Auburn, and a five-yard touchdown pass from Ewers to Matthew Golden. Texas led, 24–3, at halftime. In the third quarter, Michigan scored a 52-yard field goal by Zvada. Texas responded with a seven-yard touchdown pass from Ewers to Jaydon Blue. Michigan scored the only points of the fourth quarter via a 31-yard touchdown pass from Davis Warren to Semaj Morgan.

The loss ended Michigan's streak of 29 consecutive regular season wins. The 28 wins tied a Big Ten Conference record. Quarterback Davis Warren completed 22 passes for a career-high 204 yards. Tight end Colston Loveland recorded eight receptions for 70 yards.

Statistics	TEX	MICH
First downs	19	13
Plays–yards	68–389	56–284
Rushes–yards	32–143	23–80
Passing yards	246	204
Passing: comp–att–int	24–36–0	22–33–2
Time of possession	31:20	28:40

Team	Category	Player	Statistics
Texas	Passing	Quinn Ewers	24-36, 246 yards, 3 TD
Texas	Rushing	Ryan Wingo	1 carries, 55 yards
Texas	Receiving	Gunnar Helm	7 receptions, 98 yards, 1 TD
Michigan	Passing	Davis Warren	22-33, 204 yards, 1 TD, 2 INT
Michigan	Rushing	Donovan Edwards	8 carries, 41 yards
Michigan	Receiving	Colston Loveland	8 receptions, 70 yards

=== vs Arkansas State ===
Arkansas State Red Wolves (2–0) vs No. 17 Michigan Wolverines (1–1) – Game summary

Quarter	1	2	3	4	Total
Red Wolves	0	3	0	15	18
No. 17 Wolverines	7	14	0	7	28

at Michigan Stadium • Ann Arbor, Michigan

- Date: September 14
- Game time: Noon
- Game weather: 78 °F (26 °C), sunny, NE 7 miles per hour (11 km/h)
- Game attendance: 110,250
- Referee: Jerry McGinn
- TV announcers (BTN): Jeff Levering (play-by-play), Jake Butt (color commentator), and Brooke Fletcher (sideline reporter)

Game information

First quarter

- (2:23) MICH – Kalel Mullings 30-yard run, Dominic Zvada kick (Drive: 11 plays, 76 yards, 6:39; Michigan 7–0)

Second quarter

- (14:18) ARST – Clune Van Andel 27-yard field goal (Drive: 4 plays, 6 yards, 1:10; Michigan 7–3)
- (6:41) MICH – Donovan Edwards 7-yard run, Dominic Zvada kick (Drive: 13 plays, 75 yards, 7:37; Michigan 14–3)
- (2:57) MICH – Kalel Mullings 5-yard run, Dominic Zvada kick (Drive: 4 plays, 55 yards, 1:59; Michigan 21–3)

Fourth quarter

- (12:49) MICH – Hogan Hansen 9-yard pass from Alex Orji, Dominic Zvada kick (Drive: 9 plays, 80 yards, 5:18; Michigan 28–3)
- (5:38) ARST – Reginald Harden Jr. 24-yard pass from Timmy McClain, Clune Van Andel kick (Drive: 9 plays, 64 yards, 3:40; Michigan 28–10)
- (0:08) ARST – Reginald Harden Jr. 22-yard pass from Timmy McClain, Timmy McClain run (Drive: 11 plays, 75 yards, 3:50; Michigan 28–18)

On September 14, Michigan defeated Arkansas State, 28–18, before a crowd of 110,250 at Michigan Stadium.

Arkansas State opened the game with a 13-play, 51-yard drive to Michigan's 24-yard line, but Clune Van Andel's field goal attempt missed the mark. Michigan then drove 76 yards on 11 plays, ending with a 30-yard touchdown run by Kalel Mullings. Late in the first quarter, Davis Warren threw an interception that Charles Willekes returned 30 yards to the Michigan 15-yard line. On the third play of the second quarter, Arkansas State capitalized on the turnover, as Van Andel kicked a 27-yard field goal. Michigan responded with a 75-yard, 13-play, seven-and-a-half minute drive that featured seven runs by Donovan Edwards, including a seven-yard touchdown run. On Michigan's next possession, Michigan drove 55 yards on four plays, including a 30-yard run by Mullings to the Arkansas State five-yard line, followed by a five-yard touchdown run by Mullings. Warren was intercepted for a second time with 1:15 remaining in the half. In the final minute of the half, Arkansas State drove 58 yards to Michigan's 21-yard line, but Van Andel missed a 38-yard field goal in the final seconds of the half. Michigan led, 21–3, at halftime.

On Michigan's second possession of the second half, Davis Warren threw his third interception. Davis was replaced at quarterback by Alex Orji. Late in the third quarter and early in the fourth, Mullings and Orji led Michigan on an 80-yard drive capped by a nine-yard touchdown pass from Orji to Hogan Hansen. Midway through the fourth quarter, Arkansas State drove 64 yards, scoring on a 24-yard touchdown pass from Timmy McClain to Reginald Harden Jr. After holding Michigan to a three-and-out, Arkansas State mounted another long drive, covering 75 yards and ending with a 22-yard touchdown pass from McClain to Harden with eight seconds remaining in the game.

Davis Warren threw 14 passes, all of which were caught -- 11 by Michigan receivers and three by Arkansas State defenders. Following the game, Michigan announced that Alex Orji would take over from Warren as Michigan's starting quarterback.

Michigan tallied 301 rushing yards in the game, led by Kalel Mullings (153 yards, 15 carries, two touchdowns) and Donovan Edwards (82 yards, 17 carries, one touchdown). Tight end Marlin Klein made his first career start, recording three receptions for 43 yards.

Michigan's defense held Arkansas State to 58 rushing yards, including -6 rushing yards in the first half. However, Arkansas State quarterbacks completed 26 of 44 passes for 222 yards and two touchdowns.

Statistics	ARST	MICH
First downs	17	20
Plays–yards	69–280	62–435
Rushes–yards	25–58	44–301
Passing yards	222	134
Passing: comp–att–int	26–44–1	13–18–3
Time of possession	25:36	34:24

Team	Category	Player	Statistics
Arkansas State	Passing	Jaylen Raynor	19-33, 140 yards, 1 INT
Arkansas State	Rushing	Devin Spencer	7 carries, 28 yards
Arkansas State	Receiving	Reginald Harden Jr.	3 receptions, 52 yards, 2 TD
Michigan	Passing	Davis Warren	11-14, 122 yards, 3 INT
Michigan	Rushing	Kalel Mullings	15 carries, 153 yards, 2 TD
Michigan	Receiving	Marlin Klein	3 receptions, 43 yards

=== vs No. 11 USC ===
No. 11 USC Trojans (2–0) vs No. 18 Michigan Wolverines (2–1) – Game summary

Quarter	1	2	3	4	Total
No. 11 Trojans	0	3	14	7	24
No. 18 Wolverines	7	7	6	7	27

at Michigan Stadium • Ann Arbor, Michigan

- Date: September 21
- Game time: 3:30 p.m. EDT/12:30 p.m. PDT
- Game weather: 83 °F (28 °C), sunny, NW 7 miles per hour (11 km/h)
- Game attendance: 110,702
- Referee: Chris Coyte
- TV announcers (CBS): Brad Nessler (play-by-play), Gary Danielson (color commentator), and Jenny Dell (sideline reporter)

Game information

First quarter

- (3:10) MICH – Kalel Mullings 53-yard run (Dominic Zvada kick) (Drive: 5 plays, 63 yards, 1:40; Michigan 7–0)

Second quarter

- (7:14) MICH – Donovan Edwards 41-yard run (Dominic Zvada kick) (Drive: 6 plays, 80 yards, 3:33; Michigan 14–0)
- (4:15) USC - Michael Lantz 29-yard field goal (Drive: 8 plays, 64 yards, 2:59; Michigan 14–3)

Third quarter

- (9:12) USC – Duce Robinson 9-yard pass from Miller Moss (Michael Lantz kick) (Drive: 12 plays, 75 yards, 5:50; Michigan 14–10)
- (5:31) MICH – Will Johnson 42-yard interception return (Dominic Zvada kick blocked) (Michigan 20–10)
- (1:28) USC - Jay Fair 16-yard pass from Miller Moss (Michael Lantz kick) (Drive: 2 plays, 27 yards, 0:57; Michigan 20–17)

Fourth quarter

- (7:01) USC – Ja'Kobi Lane 24-yard pass from Miller Moss (Michael Lantz kick) (Drive: 3 plays, 18 yards, 1:27; USC 24–20)
- (0:37) MICH – Kalel Mullings 1-yard run (Dominic Zvada kick) (Drive: 10 plays, 89 yards, 3:25; Michigan 27–24)

On September 21, Michigan defeated USC, 27–24, before a crowd of 110,702 at Michigan Stadium in Ann Arbor. It was USC's first conference game as a member of the Big Ten.

The teams exchanged punts on the first four drives. On Michigan's third drive, Kalel Mullings ran 53 yards for a touchdown with 3:10 remaining in the first quarter. The team's then exchanged punts on the next three drives. On Michigan's fifth drive of the game, the Wolverines drove 80 yards in six plays, ending with a 41-yard touchdown run by Donovan Edwards. USC then drove 64 yards, including passes from Miller Moss to Zachariah Branch of 24 and 42 yards, the latter moving the ball to Michigan's 10-yard line. Michigan's defense held, and USC's Michael Lantz kicked a 29-yard field goal. Michigan led, 14–3, at halftime.

On the opening drive of the second half, USC drove 75 yards on 12 plays, ending with a nine-yard touchdown pass from Moss to Duce Robinson. Michigan was held to a three-and-out on its first drive of the second half. On USC's second drive of the second half, Will Johnson intercepted a Moss pass and returned it 42 yards for a touchdown. Dominic Zvada's extra point kick was blocked, and Michigan led, 20–10. On USC's next possession, Woody Marks ran for a 65-yard gain to the Michigan two-yard line. Moss was sacked and fumbled at the nine-yard line; Kenneth Grant recovered the fumble and returned it to the USC 18-yard line where USC's Woody Marks ripped the ball from Grant's arms for a fumble recovery. USC scored on a 16-yard pass from Moss to Jay Fair, and Michigan's lead was narrowed to 20–17 at the end of the third quarter.

With 8:35 remaining in the game, Donovan Edwards fumbled as USC linebacker Eric Gentry punched the ball from Edwards' hands and recovered the ball at Michigan's 18-yard line. USC then took the lead on a 24-yard touchdown pass from Moss to Ja'Kobi Lane. After an exchange of punts, Michigan took over at its own 11-yard line with 3:25 remaining. Mullings ran for 63 yards to the 17-yard line with 2:21 remaining and ultimately scored the winning touchdown on a one-yard run with 37 seconds remaining.

Quarterback Alex Orji made his first career start, completing seven of 12 passes for 32 yards, "the lowest output by a Michigan quarterback since 1987." Kalel Mullings rushed for 159 yards and two touchdowns on 17 carries. Donovan Edwards also tallied 74 rushing yards as Michigan backs combined for 290 rushing ayrds.

Michigan's defense held USC to -16 rushing yards in the first half. Michigan had four sacks, including two by Josaiah Stewart. Will Johnson became the first player in program history with more than two career interceptions returned for touchdowns.

Statistics	USC	MICH
First downs	17	12
Plays–yards	73–379	58–322
Rushes–yards	21–96	46–290
Passing yards	283	32
Passing: comp–att–int	28–52–1	7–12–0
Time of possession	30:42	29:18

Team	Category	Player	Statistics
USC	Passing	Miller Moss	28/51, 283 yards, 3 TD, 1 INT
USC	Rushing	Woody Marks	13 carries, 100 yards
USC	Receiving	Zachariah Branch	6 receptions, 98 yards
Michigan	Passing	Alex Orji	7/12, 32 yards
Michigan	Rushing	Kalel Mullings	17 carries, 159 yards, 2 TD
Michigan	Receiving	Marlin Klein	1 reception, 10 yards

=== vs Minnesota ===
Minnesota Golden Gophers (2–2) vs No. 12 Michigan Wolverines (3–1) – Game summary

Quarter	1	2	3	4	Total
Golden Gophers	0	3	0	21	24
No. 12 Wolverines	7	14	3	3	27

at Michigan Stadium • Ann Arbor, Michigan

- Date: September 28
- Game time: Noon
- Game weather: 67 °F (19 °C), rain, NE 8 miles per hour (13 km/h)
- Game attendance: 110,340
- Referee: Mark Kluczynski
- TV announcers (Fox): Gus Johnson (play-by-play), Joel Klatt (color commentator), and Jenny Taft (sideline reporter)

Game information

First quarter

- (6:34) MICH – Kalel Mullings 27-yard run (Dominic Zvada kick) (Drive: 9 plays, 79 yards, 4:57; Michigan 7–0)

Second quarter

- (8:59) MICH – Kalel Mullings 1-yard run (Dominic Zvada kick) (Drive: 3 plays, 16 yards, 1:26; Michigan 14–0)
- (3:48) MICH – Tyler Morris 11-yard pass from Alex Orji (Dominic Zvada kick) (Drive: 1 play, 11 yards, 0:29; Michigan 21–0)
- (0:00) MINN– Dragan Kesich 20-yard field goal (Drive: 10 plays, 77 yards, 1:54; Michigan 21–3)

Third quarter

- (7:36) MICH – Dominic Zvada 53-yard field goal (Drive: 13 plays, 40 yards, 7:24; Michigan 24–3)

Fourth quarter

- (14:01) MINN – Darius Taylor 3-yard run (Dragan Kesich kick) (Drive: 12 plays, 76 yards, 4:59; Michigan 24–10)
- (11:05) MINN – Darius Taylor 4-yard run (Dragan Kesich kick) (Drive: 3 plays, 17 yards, 0:47; Michigan 24–17)
- (4:33) MICH – Dominic Zvada 35-yard field goal (Drive: 14 plays, 58 yards, 6:32; Michigan 27–17)
- (1:37) MINN – Daniel Jackson 12-yard pass from Max Brosmer (Dragan Kesich kick) (Drive: 14 plays, 75 yards, 2:56; Michigan 27–24)

On September 28, Michigan defeated Minnesota, 27–24, before a crowd of 110,340 at Michigan Stadium in Ann Arbor, to retain the Little Brown Jug. Michigan opened the scoring in the first quarter via a 27-yard touchdown run by Kalel Mullings. Michigan scored 14 points in the second quarter via a one-yard touchdown run by Mullings and an 11-yard touchdown pass from Alex Orji to Tyler Morris. Minnesota finally got on the board via a 20-yard field goal as time expired in the first half. Michigan led, 21–3, at halftime. Michigan scored the only points of the third quarter via a 53-yard field goal by Dominic Zvada. Michigan extended their lead in the fourth quarter via a 35-yard field goal by Zvada. Minnesota scored 21 points in the fourth quarter via two touchdown runs by Darius Taylor, from three-yards, and four-yards, respectively, and a 12-yard touchdown pass from Max Brosmer to Daniel Jackson.

Michigan's defense recorded four sacks and eight tackles for loss in the first half of the game for the first time since a game against Penn State on November 15, 2021. With four receptions for 41 yards, tight end Colston Loveland's 1,112 career receiving yards ranks fifth all-time among tight ends, while his 84 career receptions ranks tied for sixth in program history.

Statistics	MINN	MICH
First downs	20	15
Plays–yards	66–296	61–241
Rushes–yards	25–38	43–155
Passing yards	258	86
Passing: comp–att–int	27–41–1	10–18–1
Time of possession	26:44	33:16

Team	Category	Player	Statistics
Minnesota	Passing	Max Brosmer	27/40, 258 yards, 1 TD, 1 INT
Minnesota	Rushing	Darius Taylor	13 carries, 36 yards, 2 TD
Minnesota	Receiving	Elijah Spencer	6 receptions, 67 yards
Michigan	Passing	Alex Orji	10/18, 86 yards, 1 TD, 1 INT
Michigan	Rushing	Kalel Mullings	24 carries, 111 yards, 2 TD
Michigan	Receiving	Colston Loveland	4 receptions, 41 yards

=== at Washington ===
No. 10 Michigan Wolverines (4–1) at Washington Huskies (3–2) – Game summary

Quarter	1	2	3	4	Total
No. 10 Wolverines	0	10	7	0	17
Huskies	7	7	0	13	27

at Husky Stadium • Seattle, Washington

- Date: October 5
- Game time: 7:30 p.m.
- Game weather: 63 °F (17 °C), sunny, N 8 miles per hour (13 km/h)
- Game attendance: 72,132
- Referee: Kole Knueppel
- TV announcers (NBC): Noah Eagle (play-by-play), Todd Blackledge (color commentator), and Kathryn Tappen (sideline reporter)

Game information

First quarter

- (2:38) WASH – Denzel Boston 3-yard pass from Will Rogers (Grady Gross kick) (Drive: 13 plays, 83 yards, 5:16; Washington 7–0)

Second quarter

- (9:38) WASH – Giles Jackson 16-yard pass from Will Rogers (Grady Gross kick) (Drive: 4 plays, 74 yards, 2:16; Washington 14–0)
- (5:25) MICH – Donovan Edwards 39-yard run (Dominic Zvada kick) (Drive: 7 plays, 75 yards, 4:13; Washington 14–7)
- (1:49) MICH – Dominic Zvada 45-yard field goal (Drive: 8 plays, 56 yards, 2:38; Washington 14–10)

Third quarter

- (8:38) MICH – Colston Loveland 8-yard pass from Jack Tuttle (Dominic Zvada kick) (Drive: 11 plays, 75 yards, 6:22; Michigan 17–14)

Fourth quarter

- (13:38) WASH – Grady Gross 28-yard field goal (Drive: 12 plays, 45 yards, 6:00; Tied 17–17)
- (6:22) WASH – Jonah Coleman 1-yard run (Grady Gross kick) (Drive: 4 plays, 32 yards, 1:40; Washington 24–17)
- (1:06) WASH – Grady Gross 32-yard field goal (Drive: 6 plays, 26 yards, 2:18; Washington 27–17)

On October 5, Michigan lost to Washington 17–27. Washington opened the scoring in the first quarter via a three-yard touchdown pass from Will Rogers to Denzel Boston. Washington extended their lead in the second quarter via a 16-yard touchdown pass from Rogers to Giles Jackson. Michigan scored ten points in the quarter via a 39-yard touchdown run by Donovan Edwards, and a 45-yard field goal by Dominic Zvada. Washington led, 14–10, at halftime. Michigan took their first lead of the game in the third quarter via an eight-yard touchdown pass from Jack Tuttle to Colston Loveland. Tuttle committed two turnovers in the final ten minutes of the game, and Washington capitalized. Washington scored 13 points in the fourth quarter via a 28-yard field goal by Grady Gross, a one-yard touchdown run by Jonah Coleman, and a 32-yard field goal by Gross.

The loss ended an 11-game streak of consecutive wins on the road for the Wolverines, which tied a program record. The loss also ended a program record streak of 27 consecutive Big Ten wins.

Statistics	MICH	WASH
First downs	17	23
Plays–yards	62–287	68–429
Rushes–yards	37–174	35–114
Passing yards	113	315
Passing: comp–att–int	13–25–1	23–33–1
Time of possession	30:30	29:30

Team	Category	Player	Statistics
Michigan	Passing	Jack Tuttle	10/18, 98 yards, 1 TD, 1 INT
Michigan	Rushing	Donovan Edwards	14 carries, 95 yards, 1 TD
Michigan	Receiving	Colston Loveland	6 receptions, 33 yards, 1 TD
Washington	Passing	Will Rogers	21/31, 271 yards, 2 TD, 1 INT
Washington	Rushing	Jonah Coleman	18 carries, 80 yards, 1 TD
Washington	Receiving	Denzel Boston	5 receptions, 80 yards, 1 TD

=== at No. 22 Illinois ===
No. 24 Michigan Wolverines (4–2) at No. 22 Illinois Fighting Illini (5–1) – Game summary

Quarter	1	2	3	4	Total
No. 24 Wolverines	0	7	0	0	7
No. 22 Fighting Illini	3	10	8	0	21

at Memorial Stadium • Champaign, Illinois

- Date: October 19
- Game time: 3:30 p.m.
- Game weather: 72 °F (22 °C), sunny, SW 4 miles per hour (6.4 km/h)
- Game attendance: 60,670
- Referee: Tim O'Dey
- TV announcers (CBS): Brad Nessler (play-by-play), Gary Danielson (color commentator), and Jenny Dell (sideline reporter)

Game information

First quarter

- (12:07) ILL – David Olano 47-yard field goal (Drive: 7 plays, 46 yards, 2:53; Illinois 3–0)

Second quarter

- (11:35) ILL – David Olano 32-yard field goal (Drive: 5 plays, 24 yards, 2:37; Illinois 6–0)
- (7:53) ILL – Tanner Arkin 2-yard pass from Luke Altmyer (David Olano kick) (Drive: 7 plays, 51 yards, 3:04; Illinois 13–0)
- (1:40) MICH – Kalel Mullings 1-yard run (Dominic Zvada kick) (Drive: 12 plays, 72 yards, 6:07; Illinois 13–7)

Third quarter

- (9:16) ILL – Luke Altmyer 1-yard run (Donovan Leary–Zakhari Franklin pass) (Drive: 8 plays, 55 yards, 3:47; Illinois 21–7)

Fourth quarter

- No scoring plays

On October 19, following its first bye week, Michigan lost to Illinois, 21–7, at Memorial Stadium in Champaign, Illinois. Illinois wore 1924 throwback uniforms to commemorate the 100th anniversary of Red Grange's six-touchdown game against Michigan on the day Memorial Stadium was dedicated.

On the opening drive of the game, Illinois drove 46 yards on seven plays, including a 29-yard run by Aidan Laughery, and took the lead on a 47-yard field goal by David Olano. Michigan punted on its first two possessions. On its third possession, quarterback Jack Tuttle fumbled at Michigan's 25-yard line, setting up a 32-yard field goal by Olano. On Michigan's next possession, Donovan Edwards fumbled and Illinois recovered the ball at midfield. The Illini then drove 51 yards on seven plays, scoring on a two-yard touchdown pass from Luke Altmyer to Tanner Arkin. Trailing, 13-0, Michigan then drove 72 yards on 12 plays, including eight runs by Kalel Mullings, ending with a one-yard touchdown run by Mullings. Illinois drove 49 yards in the closing two minutes of the first half, but Olano's field-goal attempt from 44 yards was blocked by Makari Paige. Illinois led 13–7 at halftime.

On the opening drive of the second half, Michigan was held to a three-and-out. Illinois then drove 55 yards in eight plays, including a 36-yard run by Tanner Arkin on a fake punt, and ending with a one-yard touchdown run by Altmyer and a two-point conversion pass from Donovan Leary to Zakhari Franklin. Michigan's next two drives combined for 14:13 of game time, however, they failed to score any points due to a blocked 28-yard field goal try by Dominic Zvada and an interception thrown by Tuttle at the Illinois two-yard line. Michigan's offense was held scoreless by the Fighting Illini for the final 31:40 of the game. This was Illinois' first victory against Michigan since 2009.

Michigan scored only seven points against an Illinois defense that gave up 49 points to Purdue one week earlier. It was Michigan's lowest point total since a 31-0 loss to Notre Dame in September 2014. Quarterback Jack Tuttle made his first start of the season for Michigan and completed 20 of 32 passes for 208 yards (129 in the fourth quarter) with one interception and a fumble. Tuttle was also sacked five times. After the game, CBS broadcaster Brian Jones described Michigan's offense as "pathetic" and "embarrassing" and noted that Tuttle "couldn't hit the side of a building."

Statistics	MICH	ILL
First downs	20	18
Plays–yards	70–322	57–267
Rushes–yards	38–114	38–187
Passing yards	208	80
Passing: comp–att–int	20–32–1	9–19–0
Time of possession	33:34	26:26

Team	Category	Player	Statistics
Michigan	Passing	Jack Tuttle	20/32, 208 yards, 1 INT
Michigan	Rushing	Kalel Mullings	19 carries, 87 yards, 1 TD
Michigan	Receiving	Colston Loveland	7 receptions, 83 yards
Illinois	Passing	Luke Altmyer	9/18, 80 yards, 1 TD
Illinois	Rushing	Aidan Laughery	9 carries, 54 yards
Illinois	Receiving	Pat Bryant	4 receptions, 32 yards

=== vs Michigan State ===
Michigan State Spartans (4–3) vs Michigan Wolverines (4–3) – Game summary

Quarter	1	2	3	4	Total
Spartans	7	0	3	7	17
Wolverines	0	9	7	8	24

at Michigan Stadium • Ann Arbor, Michigan

- Date: October 26
- Game time: 7:30 p.m.
- Game weather: 46 °F (8 °C), clear, N 5 miles per hour (8.0 km/h)
- Game attendance: 110,849
- Referee: Larry Smith
- TV announcers (BTN): Jeff Levering (play-by-play), Jake Butt (analyst), and Brooke Fletcher (sideline reporter)

Game information

First quarter

- (0:10) MSU – Nate Carter 2-yard run (Jonathan Kim kick) (Drive: 9 plays, 62 yards, 5:13; Michigan State 7–0)

Second quarter

- (0:29) MICH – Colston Loveland 10-yard pass from Davis Warren (pass failed) (Drive: 10 plays, 64 yards, 2:29; Michigan State 7–6)
- (0:02) MICH – Dominic Zvada 37-yard field goal (Drive: 2 plays, 15 yards, 0:12; Michigan 9–7)

Third quarter

- (9:49) MICH – Alex Orji 2-yard run (Dominic Zvada kick) (Drive: 11 plays, 75 yards, 5:11; Michigan 16–7)
- (3:45) MSU – Jonathan Kim 46-yard field goal (Drive: 10 plays, 67 yards, 6:04; Michigan 16–10)

Fourth quarter

- (13:20) MICH – Colston Loveland 23-yard pass from Donovan Edwards (Davis Warren–Colston Loveland pass) (Drive: 5 plays, 60 yards, 2:06; Michigan 24–10)
- (6:12) MSU – Nick Marsh 20-yard pass from Aidan Chiles (Jonathan Kim kick) (Drive: 13 plays, 75 yards, 7:08; Michigan 24–17)

On October 26, Michigan faced their in-state rivals, the Michigan State Spartans, in the annual battle for the Paul Bunyan Trophy. Before a crowd of 110,849, Michigan defeated Michigan State 24–17. Michigan State opened the scoring in the first quarter via a two-yard touchdown run by Nate Carter. Michigan scored nine points in the second quarter via a ten-yard touchdown pass from Davis Warren to Colston Loveland and a 37-yard field goal by Dominic Zvada. Michigan led, 9–7, at halftime. Michigan extended their lead in the third quarter via a two-yard touchdown run by Alex Orji. Michigan State responded with a 46-yard field goal by Jonathan Kim. Michigan extended their lead in the fourth quarter via a 23-yard touchdown pass from Donovan Edwards to Loveland and a successful two-point conversion attempt. Michigan State scored the final points of the game via a 20-yard touchdown pass from Aidan Chiles to Nick Marsh. Michigan State's attempted comeback failed after Quinten Johnson recorded a pass breakup on a fourth-down play with two minutes remaining in the game to secure Michigan's victory.

With six receptions for 67 yards, tight end Colston Loveland ranks third all-time with 103 career receptions. With two touchdown receptions in the game, Loveland ranks third all-time in career receiving touchdowns with ten. With two receptions for 17 yards, running back Donovan Edwards tied B. J. Askew for the second-most receiving yards by a running back in program history with 777 yards.

With this win, Sherrone Moore is the first Michigan head coach since Bennie Oosterbaan in 1948 to defeat Michigan State in his first year.

Statistics	MSU	MICH
First downs	18	17
Plays–yards	65–352	61–265
Rushes–yards	42–163	31–119
Passing yards	189	146
Passing: comp–att–int	17–23–0	14–20–0
Time of possession	37:05	22:55

Team	Category	Player	Statistics
Michigan State	Passing	Aidan Chiles	17/23, 189 yards, 1 TD
Michigan State	Rushing	Nate Carter	19 carries, 118 yards, 1 TD
Michigan State	Receiving	Nate Carter	2 receptions, 56 yards
Michigan	Passing	Davis Warren	13/19, 123 yards, 1 TD
Michigan	Rushing	Alex Orji	6 carries, 64 yards, 1 TD
Michigan	Receiving	Colston Loveland	6 receptions, 67 yards, 2 TD

=== vs No. 1 Oregon ===
No. 1 Oregon Ducks (8–0) vs Michigan Wolverines (5–3) – Game summary

Quarter	1	2	3	4	Total
No. 1 Ducks	7	21	3	7	38
Wolverines	7	3	7	0	17

at Michigan Stadium • Ann Arbor, Michigan

- Date: November 2
- Game time: 3:30 p.m.
- Game weather: 53 °F (12 °C), sunny, S 2 miles per hour (3.2 km/h)
- Game attendance: 110,576
- Referee: Ron Snodgrass
- TV announcers (CBS): Brad Nessler (play-by-play), Gary Danielson (color commentator), and Jenny Dell (sideline reporter)

Game information

First quarter

- (6:53) ORE – Evan Stewart 2-yard pass from Dillon Gabriel (Atticus Sappington kick) (Drive: 12 plays, 63 yards, 6:26; Oregon 7–0)
- (1:31) MICH – Tyler Morris 7-yard pass from Davis Warren (Dominic Zvada kick) (Drive: 5 plays, 28 yards, 3:19; Tied 7–7)

Second quarter

- (14:30) ORE – Noah Whittington 1-yard run (Atticus Sappington kick) (Drive: 6 plays, 75 yards, 2:01; Oregon 14–7)
- (4:19) ORE – Noah Whittington 6-yard run (Atticus Sappington kick) (Drive: 10 plays, 94 yards, 4:41; Oregon 21–7)
- (1:51) MICH – Dominic Zvada 38-yard field goal (Drive: 7 plays, 55 yards, 2:28; Oregon 21–10)
- (0:35) ORE – Dillon Gabriel 23-yard run (Atticus Sappington kick) (Drive: 7 plays, 80 yards, 1:12; Oregon 28–10)

Third quarter

- (7:09) MICH – Peyton O'Leary 6-yard pass from Davis Warren (Dominic Zvada kick) (Drive: 10 plays, 75 yards, 6:35; Oregon 28–17)
- (0:36) ORE – Atticus Sappington 26-yard field goal (Drive: 15 plays, 67 yards, 6:33; Oregon 31–17)

Fourth quarter

- (0:25) ORE – Jordan James 2-yard run (Atticus Sappington kick) (Drive: 11 plays, 90 yards, 6:59; Oregon 38–17)

On November 2, Michigan lost to No. 1 Oregon 38–17, before a crowd of 110,576 at Michigan Stadium. Oregon opened the scoring in the first quarter via a two-yard touchdown pass from Dillon Gabriel to Evan Stewart. Michigan responded with a seven-yard touchdown pass from Davis Warren to Tyler Morris to tie the game. Oregon scored 21 points in the second quarter via two touchdown runs by Noah Whittington, from one-yard, and six-yards, respectively, and a 23-yard touchdown run by Gabriel. Michigan's only points in the quarter were scored via a 38-yard field goal by Dominic Zvada. Oregon led, 28–10 at halftime. In the third quarter, Michigan scored via a six-yard touchdown pass from Warren to Peyton O'Leary. Oregon responded with a 26-yard field goal by Atticus Sappington. Oregon scored the only points of the fourth quarter via a two-yard touchdown run by Jordan James. Michigan played the game without their top defensive player Will Johnson.

Quarterback Davis Warren completed 12 passes for 164 yards and two touchdowns, his first multi-touchdown game of his career. With one reception during the game, running back Donovan Edwards passed B. J. Askew for the second-most receiving yards by a running back in program history.

Statistics	ORE	MICH
First downs	23	11
Plays–yards	71–470	53–270
Rushes–yards	37–176	28–105
Passing yards	294	165
Passing: comp–att–int	22–34–0	13–25–0
Time of possession	32:28	27:32

Team	Category	Player	Statistics
Oregon	Passing	Dillon Gabriel	22/34, 294 yards, 1 TD
Oregon	Rushing	Jordan James	23 carries, 117 yards, 1 TD
Oregon	Receiving	Traeshon Holden	6 receptions, 149 yards
Michigan	Passing	Davis Warren	12/21, 164 yards, 2 TD
Michigan	Rushing	Donovan Edwards	10 carries, 52 yards
Michigan	Receiving	Colston Loveland	7 receptions, 112 yards

=== at No. 8 Indiana ===
Michigan Wolverines (5–4) at No. 8 Indiana Hoosiers (9–0) – Game summary

Quarter	1	2	3	4	Total
Wolverines	3	0	6	6	15
No. 8 Hoosiers	7	10	0	3	20

at Memorial Stadium • Bloomington, Indiana

- Date: November 9
- Game time: 3:30 p.m.
- Game weather: 61 °F (16 °C), sunny, E 6 miles per hour (9.7 km/h)
- Game attendance: 53,082
- Referee: Bryan Banks
- TV announcers (CBS): Brad Nessler (play-by-play), Gary Danielson (color commentator), and Jenny Dell (sideline reporter)

Game information

First quarter

- (5:01) MICH – Dominic Zvada 39-yard field goal (Drive: 14 plays, 66 yards, 7:30; Michigan 3–0)
- (1:17) IU – Omar Cooper Jr. 7-yard pass from Kurtis Rourke (Nicolas Radicic kick) (Drive: 7 plays, 75 yards, 3:44; Indiana 7–3)

Second quarter

- (12:10) IU – Elijah Sarratt 36-yard pass from Kurtis Rourke (Nicolas Radicic kick) (Drive: 7 plays, 65 yards, 3:08; Indiana 14–3)
- (2:20) IU – Nicolas Radicic 40-yard field goal (Drive: 5 plays, 27 yards, 3:23; Indiana 17–3)

Third quarter

- (8:41) MICH – Dominic Zvada 22-yard field goal (Drive: 4 plays, 4 yards, 2:18; Indiana 17–6)
- (0:08) MICH – Dominic Zvada 56-yard field goal (Drive: 12 plays, 44 yards, 7:03; Indiana 17–9)

Fourth quarter

- (9:35) MICH – Kalel Mullings 1-yard run (pass failed) (Drive: 7 plays, 34 yards, 3:52; Indiana 17–15)
- (2:34) IU – Nicolas Radicic 41-yard field goal (Drive: 6 plays, 16 yards, 2:46; Indiana 20–15)

On November 9, Michigan lost to No. 8 Indiana 20–15. Michigan opened the scoring in the first quarter via a 39-yard field goal by Dominic Zvada. Indiana repsonded with a seven-yard touchdown pass from Kurtis Rourke to Omar Cooper Jr. Indiana scored ten points in the second via a 36-yard touchdown pass from Rourke to Elijah Sarratt and a 40-yard field goal by Nicolas Radicic. Indiana led, 17–3, at halftime. Michigan scored the only points of the third quarter via two field goals by Zvada, from 22-yards, and 56-yards, respectively. Michigan scored in the fourth quarter via a one-yard touchdown run by Kalel Mullings, and a failed two-point conversion attempt. Indiana scored the final points of the game via a 41-yard field goal by Radicic.

With four receptions during the game, tight end Colston Loveland tied Bennie Joppru for the most receptions by a tight end in single season program history with 53. With a pass breakup in the first quarter, Kenneth Grant passed Ryan Van Bergen for the most career pass breakups among defensive linemen in program history with 12.

Statistics	MICH	IU
First downs	16	14
Plays–yards	66–206	56–246
Rushes–yards	34–69	28–40
Passing yards	137	206
Passing: comp–att–int	16–32–0	17–28–1
Time of possession	33:08	26:52

Team	Category	Player	Statistics
Michigan	Passing	Davis Warren	16/32, 137 yards
Michigan	Rushing	Donovan Edwards	15 carries, 46 yards
Michigan	Receiving	Colston Loveland	4 receptions, 37 yards
Indiana	Passing	Kurtis Rourke	17/28, 206 yards, 2 TD, INT
Indiana	Rushing	Ty Son Lawton	12 carries, 55 yards
Indiana	Receiving	Ke'Shawn Williams	6 receptions, 70 yards

=== vs Northwestern ===
Northwestern Wildcats (4–6) vs Michigan Wolverines (5–5) – Game summary

Quarter	1	2	3	4	Total
Wildcats	0	6	0	0	6
Wolverines	10	7	14	19	50

at Michigan Stadium • Ann Arbor, Michigan

- Date: November 23
- Game time: 3:30 p.m. ET
- Game weather: 44 °F (7 °C), sunny, NW 12 miles per hour (19 km/h)
- Game attendance: 109,830
- Referee: Jeffrey Servinski
- TV announcers (FS1): Tim Brando (play-by-play), Devin Gardner (analyst), and Josh Sims (sideline reporter)

Game information

First quarter

- (6:44) MICH – Kalel Mullings 1-yard run (Dominic Zvada kick) (Drive: 11 plays, 53 yards, 5:51; Michigan 7–0)
- (1:09) MICH – Dominic Zvada 56-yard field goal (Drive: 6 plays, 10 yards, 3:52; Michigan 10–0)

Second quarter

- (6:25) NW – Luke Akers 28-yard field goal (Drive: 5 plays, 10 yards, 2:11; Michigan 10–3)
- (1:57) NW – Luke Akers 26-yard field goal (Drive: 5 plays, 46 yards, 2:17; Michigan 10–6)
- (0:08) MICH – Colston Loveland 3-yard pass from Davis Warren (Dominic Zvada kick) (Drive: 11 plays, 65 yards, 1:49; Michigan 17–6)

Third quarter

- (12:10) MICH – Kalel Mullings 10-yard run (Dominic Zvada kick) (Drive: 5 plays, 75 yards, 2:50; Michigan 24–6)
- (5:12) MICH – Kalel Mullings 1-yard run (Dominic Zvada kick) (Drive: 10 plays, 45 yards, 5:30; Michigan 31–6)

Fourth quarter

- (13:40) MICH – Donovan Edwards 20-yard run (Dominic Zvada kick) (Drive: 5 plays, 58 yards, 2:41; Michigan 38–6)
- (5:22) MICH – Dominic Zvada 28-yard field goal (Drive: 14 plays, 53 yards, 7:07; Michigan 41–6)
- (4:28) MICH – Team safety (Michigan 43–6)
- (4:10) MICH – Tavierre Dunlap 20-yard run (Charlie Mentzer kick) (Drive: 1 play, 20 yards, 0:07; Michigan 50–6)

On November 23, following their bye week, Michigan defeated Northwestern, 50–6, before a crowd of 109,830 at Michigan Stadium.

On the opening drive of the game, Michigan defensive back Aamir Hall intercepted a Northwestern pass, and the Wolverines took over near midfield. They drove 53 yards and scored on a two-yard touchdown run by Kalel Mullings. After holding Northwestern to a three-and-out and a short punt, the Wolverines again took over near midfield. After advancing to the Northwestern 38-yard line, Dominic Zvada kicked a 56-yard field goal.

In the second quarter, Michigan quarterback Davis Warren threw an interception that was returned 25 yards to the Michigan 20-yard line, and Luke Akers kicked a 28-yard field goal for Northwestern. On its next possession, Northwestern drove 46 yards, including a 39-yard pass completion from Jack Lausch to Bryce Kirtz and a 26-yard field goal by Akers. In the final two minutes of the half, Michigan drove 65 yards on 11 plays and scored on a three-yard touchdown pass from Warren to Colston Loveland. Michigan led, 17–6, at halftime.

On the opening drive of the second half, Michigan drove 75 yards on five plays, including a 47-yard run by Mullings and ending with a 10-yard touchdown run by Mullings. On its next possession, Michigan drove 45 yards on 10 plays, scoring on a one-yard run by Mullings.

Late in the third quarter and early in the fourth, the Wolverines drove 58 yards on five plays, including a 24-yard run by Donovan Edwards followed by a 20-yard touchdown run by Edwards. After holding Northwestern to a three-and-out, the Wolverines again drove 53 yards, including a 28-yard pass from Warren to Tyler Morris and a 28-yard field goal by Zvada. On Northwestern's net possession, quarterback Ryan Hilinski was penalized for intentional grounding in the end zone, resulting in a safety. On the ensuing kickoff, freshman Jordan Marshall returned the kick 63 yards to the Northwestern 20-yard line. Tavierre Dunlap ran 20 yards for a touchdown to conclude the scoring.

Michigan tallied 396 yards of total offense in the game. Warren led the way with 195 passing yards, and Mullings tallied 92 rushing yards and three touchdowns. Tight end Colston Loveland caught three passes to break Michigan's single-season record for the most receptions by a tight end with 56.

Michigan's defense held Northwestern to 10 rushing yards and 117 passing yards. with two interceptions, six sacks, eight tackles for loss. Northwestern tallied only 43 yards in the second half.

Statistics	NW	MICH
First downs	8	25
Plays–yards	49–127	70–396
Rushes–yards	25–10	35–201
Passing yards	117	195
Passing: comp–att–int	12–24–2	26–35–1
Time of possession	24:19	35:41

Team	Category	Player	Statistics
Northwestern	Passing	Jack Lausch	10/21, 106 yards, 2 INT
Northwestern	Rushing	Cam Porter	7 carries, 24 yards
Northwestern	Receiving	Bryce Kirtz	3 receptions, 67 yards
Michigan	Passing	Davis Warren	26/35, 195 yards, 1 TD, 1 INT
Michigan	Rushing	Kalel Mullings	12 carries, 92 yards, 3 TD
Michigan	Receiving	Tyler Morris	7 receptions, 64 yards

=== at No. 2 Ohio State ===
Michigan Wolverines (6–5) at No. 2 Ohio State Buckeyes (10–1) – Game summary

Quarter	1	2	3	4	Total
Wolverines	0	10	0	3	13
No. 2 Buckeyes	3	7	0	0	10

at Ohio Stadium • Columbus, Ohio

- Date: November 30
- Game time: 12:00 p.m. ET
- Game weather: 26 °F (−3 °C), sunny, W 11 miles per hour (18 km/h)
- Game attendance: 106,005
- Referee: Larry Smith
- TV announcers (Fox): Gus Johnson (play-by-play), Joel Klatt (color commentator), Jenny Taft, and Tom Rinaldi (sideline reporters)

Game information

First quarter

- (6:14) OSU – Jayden Fielding 29-yard field goal (Drive: 9 plays, 58 yards, 4:19; Ohio State 3–0)

Second quarter

- (12:37) MICH – Kalel Mullings 1-yard run, Dominic Zvada kick (Drive: 2 plays, 2 yards, 0:44; Michigan 7–3)
- (2:15) MICH – Dominic Zvada 54-yard field goal (Drive: 4 plays, 3 yards, 2:02; Michigan 10–3)
- (0:30) OSU – Jeremiah Smith 10-yard pass from Will Howard, Jayden Fielding kick (Drive: 9 plays, 75 yards, 1:45; Tied 10–10)

Third quarter

- No scoring plays

Fourth quarter

- (0:45) MICH – Dominic Zvada 21-yard field goal (Drive: 11 plays, 57 yards, 5:28; Michigan 13–10)

On November 30, Michigan upset No. 2 Ohio State 13–10. Ohio State opened the scoring in the first quarter via a 29-yard field goal by Jayden Fielding. Michigan scored ten points in the second quarter via a one-yard touchdown run by Kalel Mullings and a 54-yard field goal by Dominic Zvada. Ohio State scored the final points of the quarter via a ten-yard touchdown pass from Will Howard to Jeremiah Smith. The score was tied, 10–10, at halftime. Ohio State was held scoreless in the second-half. After a scoreless third quarter, Michigan scored the final points on a game-winning 21-yard field goal by Zvada with 45 seconds remaining.

The win marked the fourth consecutive against the Buckeyes, the longest streak for the Wolverines since 1988–91, Michigan's first victory over Ohio State while unranked since 1993, Michigan's first victory over Ohio State in Columbus while unranked since 1966, and the largest upset in the series history. With his 54-yard field goal in the second quarter, Dominic Zvada extended his program record of 50-plus yard field goals to seven on the season.

Following the conclusion of the game, a fight broke out between members of the two teams after members of the Wolverines attempted to plant a flag at midfield. The skirmish ended with a few players and coaches bloodied and several players having been pepper sprayed by members of law enforcement. Both teams were later fined $100,000 by the conference. Shirts with a graphic depicting a player planting a flag reading "13-10" were sold shortly thereafter.

Statistics	MICH	OSU
First downs	13	16
Plays–yards	58–234	59–252
Rushes–yards	42–172	26–77
Passing yards	62	175
Passing: comp–att–int	9–16–2	19–33–2
Time of possession	33:35	26:25

Team	Category	Player	Statistics
Michigan	Passing	Davis Warren	9/16, 62 yards, 2 INT
Michigan	Rushing	Kalel Mullings	32 carries, 116 yards, 1 TD
Michigan	Receiving	Peyton O'Leary	1 reception, 18 yards
Ohio State	Passing	Will Howard	19/33, 175 yards, 1 TD, 2 INT
Ohio State	Rushing	Quinshon Judkins	12 carries, 46 yards
Ohio State	Receiving	Carnell Tate	6 receptions, 58 yards

=== vs No. 11 Alabama—ReliaQuest Bowl ===
2024 ReliaQuest Bowl
No. 11 Alabama Crimson Tide (9–3) vs Michigan Wolverines (7–5) – Game summary

Quarter	1	2	3	4	Total
No. 11 Crimson Tide	0	10	0	3	13
Wolverines	16	0	0	3	19

at Raymond James Stadium • Tampa, Florida

- Date: Tuesday, December 31, 2024
- Game time: 12:00 p.m. EST
- Game weather: 76 °F (24 °C), cloudy, NE 10 miles per hour (16 km/h)
- Game attendance: 51,439
- Referee: Tutashina Salaam
- TV announcers (ESPN/ESPN Radio): Dave Flemming (play-by-play), Brock Osweiler (analyst), and Stormy Buonantony (sideline)/Chris Carlin (play-by-play), Aaron Murray (analyst), and Mike Peasley (sideline)

Game information

First quarter

- (8:15) MICH – Dominic Zvada 45-yard field goal (Drive: 7 plays, 17 yards, 4:01; Michigan 3–0)
- (5:52) MICH – Dominic Zvada 30-yard field goal (Drive: 4 plays, 7 yards, 2:18; Michigan 6–0)
- (4:15) MICH – Fredrick Moore 13-yard pass from Davis Warren, Dominic Zvada kick (Drive: 3 plays, 16 yards, 0:48; Michigan 13–0)
- (2:04) MICH – Dominic Zvada 21-yard field goal (Drive: 4 plays, 3 yards, 2:04; Michigan 16–0)

Second quarter

- (4:06) ALA – Robbie Ouzts 25-yard pass from Jalen Milroe (Drive: 4 plays, 71 yards, 1:50; Michigan 16–7)
- (0:04) ALA – Graham Nicholson 24-yard field goal (Drive: 8 plays, 90 yards, 0:55; Michigan 16–10)

Third quarter

- No scoring plays

Fourth quarter

- (7:21) MICH – Dominic Zvada 37-yard field goal (Drive: 9 plays, 47 yards, 5:17; Michigan 19–10)
- (4:38) ALA – Graham Nicholson 51-yard field goal (Drive: 8 plays, 42 yards, 2:43; Michigan 19–13)

On December 31, Michigan upset No. 11 Alabama, 19–13, in the ReliaQuest Bowl before a crowd of 51,439 at Raymond James Stadium in Tampa, Florida. Michigan's defense forced turnovers on Alabama's first four possessions, resulting in a 16-0 lead at the end of the first quarter.

- The Crimson Tide received the opening kickoff and drove nine yards on six plays. On fourth down with four yards to go from the Michigan 45-yard line, Michigan defensive end Derrick Moore sacked Alabama quarterback Jalen Milroe. Michigan drove 17 yards to the Alabama 27-yard line, and Dominic Zvada kicked a 45-yard field goal at the 8:15 mark.
- On Alabama's next play from scrimmage, as hard rain fell, Milroe fumbled, and Derrick Moore recovered the ball at Alabama's 25-yard line. Michigan advanced the ball seven yards, and Zvada kicked a 30-yard field goal at the 5:52 mark.
- On Alabama's third possession, Milroe was intercepted by Wesley Walker, and Michigan took over at Alabama's 16-yard line. Michigan quarterback Davis Warren completed a 13-yard touchdown pass to Fredrick Moore at the 4:15 mark.
- On Alabama's next play from scrimmage, Milroe was sacked for a loss of 14 yards and fumbled with Michigan's Cameron Brandt recovering the ball and returning it to Alabama's five-yard line. Michigan advanced the ball only three yards, and Zvada kicked a 21-yard field goal.

Michigan and Alabama exchanged punts on the next four possessions. Late in the second quarter, Alabama drove 71 yards on four plays, scoring on a 25-yard touchdown pass from Milroe to tight end Robbie Ouzts with 4:06 remaining in the half. Alabama got the ball back at its own five-yard line with 58 seconds remaining in the half and drove 90 yards, scoring on a 24-yard field goal by Graham Nicholson. Michigan led, 16–10, at halftime.

In the third quarter, Michigan and Alabama exchanged punts on four drives. Davis Warren was sacked by James Smith early in the third quarter, sustained a torn ACL in his right knee, and missed the remainder of the game. With 23 seconds remaining in the third quarter, Michigan quarterback Alex Orji was intercepted at midfield, and Alabama drove to the Michigan 34-yard line, but the defense held on fourth and seven, as Milroe's pass was incomplete. Michigan then drove 47 yards, led by a 24-yard run by Jordan Marshall, and Zvada kicked a 37-yard field goal -- his fourth of the game. Alabama responded with a 42-yard drive and 51-yard field goal by Nicholson. On its final drive, Alabama started at midfield after a 38-yard punt return by wide receiver Ryan Williams. The Crimson Tide then drove to the Michigan 15-yard line, but Milroe threw four incomplete passes, and Michigan took over on downs.

On offense, Michigan tallied 190 yards (115 rushing, 75 passing). Freshman running back Jordan Marshall, having previously rushed for only 20 yards in the regular season, got his first start for Michigan, accounted for more than half of Michigan's total offense (100 rushing yards on 23 carries), and was chosen as the game's most valuable player.

On defense, the Wolverines held Alabama to 68 rushing yards and 192 passing yards. Michigan's defense also tallied five sacks and six tackles for loss, including two sacks by Derrick Moore.

Statistics	ALA	MICH
First downs	15	13
Plays–yards	62–260	66–190
Rushes–yards	29–68	51–115
Passing yards	192	75
Passing: comp–att–int	16–33–1	11–15–1
Time of possession	21:48	38:12

Team	Category	Player	Statistics
Alabama	Passing	Jalen Milroe	16/32, 192 yards, 1 TD, 1 INT
Alabama	Rushing	Rico Scott	1 carry, 28 yards
Alabama	Receiving	Germie Bernard	4 receptions, 80 yards
Michigan	Passing	Davis Warren	9/12, 73 yards, 1 TD
Michigan	Rushing	Jordan Marshall	23 carries, 100 yards
Michigan	Receiving	Fredrick Moore	3 receptions, 37 yards, 1 TD

== Personnel ==
=== Roster ===
2024 Michigan Wolverines football team roster
Players
Coaches
Offense

Pos.	#	Name	Class
WR	0	Semaj Morgan	So
WR	1	Amorion Walker	Jr
QB	2	Jadyn Davis	Fr
WR	3	Fredrick Moore	So
QB	4	Jayden Denegal	So
WR	5	C.J. Charleston	Sr
RB	7	Donovan Edwards (C)	Sr
WR	8	Tyler Morris	Jr
QB	10	Alex Orji	So
WR	12	Kendrick Bell	Fr
QB	13	Jack Tuttle	Sr
WR	14	Channing Goodwin	Fr
QB	15	Anthony Arnou	Sr
QB	16	Davis Warren	Jr
TE	17	Marlin Klein	So
TE	18	Colston Loveland	Jr
RB	20	Kalel Mullings	Sr
RB	22	Tavierre Dunlap	Jr
RB	23	Jordan Marshall	Fr
RB	24	Cole Cabana	Fr
RB	25	Micah Ka'apana	Fr
RB	28	Benjamin Hall	Fr
RB	34	Leon Franklin	Sr
WR	35	Logan Forbes	So
RB	36	Tomas O’Meara	Fr
TE	38	Grayson Dee	So
WR	38	Bryce Wilcox	Jr
WR	39	Joe Taylor	Jr
RB	41	Bryson Kuzdzal	Fr
TE	42	Jalen Hoffman	Fr
TE	43	Deakon Tonielli	Fr
TE	44	Max Bredeson (C)	Jr
TE	45	Noah Howes	Jr
TE	46	Brandon Mann	So
RB	49	Henry Donohue	Jr
OL	50	Luke Hamilton	Fr
OL	51	Greg Crippen	Jr
OL	52	Cole Morgan	So
OL	53	Jake Guarnera	Fr
OL	54	Andrew Sprague	Fr
OL	55	Nathan Efobi	Fr
OL	56	Dominick Giudice	Jr
OL	58	Giovanni El-Hadi	Jr
OL	60	Brooks Bahr	Fr
OL	62	Raheem Anderson	Jr
OL	66	Dan Taraboi	Jr
OL	68	Josh Priebe	Sr
OL	71	Evan Link	Fr
OL	72	Tristan Bounds	Jr
OL	73	Ben Roebuck	Fr
OL	75	Andrew Gentry	So
OL	76	Connor Jones	So
OL	77	Blake Frazier	Fr
OL	78	Myles Hinton	Sr
OL	79	Jeffrey Persi	Sr
TE	80	Hogan Hansen	Fr
WR	81	Peyton O'Leary	Jr
WR	82	I'Marion Stewart	Fr
TE	83	Zack Marshall	Fr
TE	86	Brady Prieskorn	Fr
WR	85	Drew Hickmott	Fr
WR	89	Kaleb Schlecht	So

Defense

Pos.	#	Name	Class
EDGE	0	Josaiah Stewart (C)	Sr
LB	1	Jaishawn Barham	Jr
DB	2	Will Johnson	Jr
DB	3	Jaden Mangham (injured)	Jr
LB	4	Micah Pollard	Jr
DB	5	Jacob Oden	Fr
DB	6	Brandyn Hillman	So
DB	7	Makari Paige (C)	Sr
EDGE	8	Derrick Moore	Jr
DB	9	Rod Moore (injured) (C)	Sr
DB	10	Zeke Berry	So
DB	12	Aamir Hall	Sr
DB	13	Wesley Walker	Sr
DB	14	Kody Jones	So
LB	15	Ernest Hausmann	Jr
DB	16	Jo'Ziah Edmond	Fr
DL	17	Enow Etta	Fr
DB	18	Ja'Den McBurrows	Jr
DB	20	Jyaire Hill	Fr
DB	22	Ricky Johnson	Sr
LB	23	Cole Sullivan	Fr
DB	24	Myles Pollard	So
DB	25	Mason Curtis	Fr
DL	26	Rayshaun Benny	Jr
EDGE	27	Tyler McLaurin	Jr
DB	28	Quinten Johnson	Sr
DB	29	Joshua Nichols	So
LB	30	Jimmy Rolder	Jr
DB	31	Nico Andrighetto	So
DB	31	Max Reyes	Jr
DB	32	Jeremiah Lowe	Fr
EDGE	33	Dominic Nichols	Fr
LB	34	Jaydon Hood	Jr
DB	36	Keshaun Harris	Sr
DB	37	Micah Davis	Fr
DB	37	Shomari Stone	Jr
LB	39	Jack MacKinnon	Fr
LB	40	Christian Boivin	Jr
EDGE	42	TJ Guy	Jr
LB	43	Zach Ludwig	Fr
LB	44	Jason Hewlett	Fr
LB	46	Alexander Lidback	Sr
EDGE	52	Kechaun Bennett	Jr
LB	53	Liam Groulx	Fr
DL	54	Deyvid Palepale	Fr
DL	55	Mason Graham	Jr
LB	56	Joel Metzger	Jr
EDGE	58	Breeon Ishmail	Fr
LB	59	John Weidenbach	So
DL	70	Peter Simmons	Jr
DL	76	Manuel Beigel	Fr
DT	78	Kenneth Grant	Jr
EDGE	82	Devon Baxter	Fr
DL	85	Ted Hammond	Fr
EDGE	88	Lugard Edokpayi	Fr
DL	89	Alessandro Lorenzetti	So
EDGE	90	Aymeric Koumba	Fr
DL	91	Cameron Brandt	So
DL	92	Ike Iwunnah	Jr
EDGE	93	Joey Klunder	So
DL	95	Trey Pierce	So
EDGE	97	Chibi Anwunah	So
DL	99	Owen Wafle	Fr

Special teams

Pos.	#	Name	Class
K, P	19	Tommy Doman	Jr
K	35	Stuart Blake	Fr
LS	45	Greg Tarr	Sr
LS	49	William Wagner	Sr
LS	64	James Kavouklis	So
LS	74	Dan Rosenberg	So
K, P	90	Hudson Hollenbeck	So
LS	91	Evan Boutorwick	So
K, P	92	Stone Anderson	So
K, P	93	Charlie Mentzer	Sr
K	96	Dominic Zvada	Jr
K	99	Adam Samaha	Fr

Head coach

- Sherrone Moore

Coordinators/assistant coaches

- Don Martindale (defensive coordinator)
- Kirk Campbell (offensive coordinator / quarterbacks)
- J.B. Brown (special teams coordinator)
- Tony Alford (running backs / run game coordinator)
- Ronald Bellamy (wide receivers / pass game coordinator)
- Grant Newsome (offensive line)
- Steve Casula (tight ends)
- LaMar Morgan (defensive backs / defensive pass game coordinator)
- Brian Jean-Mary (linebackers / defensive run game coordinator)
- Lou Esposito (defensive line)
- Justin Tress (strength and conditioning coach)

Support staff

- Jack Clark (offensive analyst / tight ends)
- Garrett Clawson (assistant special teams)
- Nick Gilbert (assistant offensive line)
- Brad Hawkins (assistant defensive backs (GA))
- Bret Ingalls (senior offensive analyst)
- Fred Jackson (senior offensive analyst / running backs)
- Grant Kurzner (special teams analyst)
- Anthony Marciano (defensive analyst)
- Pernell McPhee (outside linebackers (GA))
- Josh Sinagoga (offensive analyst / quarterbacks)
- Lionel Stokes (defensive analyst / safeties)
- Kevin Wilkins (defensive analyst / linebackers)

Legend

- (C) Team captain
- (S) Suspended
- (I) Ineligible
- Injured
- Redshirt

Roster
Last update: August 23, 2024

=== 2024 recruiting class ===
College recruiting
Name	Hometown	School	Height	Weight	Commit date
Jordan Marshall; RB	West Chester, Ohio	Moeller High School	5 ft 10.5 in (1.79 m)	193 lb (88 kg)	Mar 21, 2023
Jordan Marshall; RB	Recruit ratings: Rivals: 247Sports: ESPN:				
Brady Prieskorn; TE	Lake Orion, Michigan	Rochester Adams High School	6 ft 6 in (1.98 m)	225 lb (102 kg)	Apr 25, 2023
Brady Prieskorn; TE	Recruit ratings: Rivals: 247Sports: ESPN:				
Jadyn Davis; QB	Fort Mill, South Carolina	Providence Day School	6 ft 0.5 in (1.84 m)	202 lb (92 kg)	Mar 31, 2023
Jadyn Davis; QB	Recruit ratings: Rivals: 247Sports: ESPN:				
Andrew Sprague; OT	Kansas City, Missouri	Rockhurst High School	6 ft 8 in (2.03 m)	295 lb (134 kg)	Apr 7, 2023
Andrew Sprague; OT	Recruit ratings: Rivals: 247Sports: ESPN:				
Blake Frazier; OT	Austin, Texas	Vandegrift High School	6 ft 5 in (1.96 m)	260 lb (120 kg)	Apr 16, 2023
Blake Frazier; OT	Recruit ratings: Rivals: 247Sports: ESPN:				
Lugard Edokpayi; EDGE	Bowie, Maryland	Bishop McNamara High School	6 ft 6 in (1.98 m)	230 lb (100 kg)	Dec 20, 2023
Lugard Edokpayi; EDGE	Recruit ratings: Rivals: 247Sports: ESPN:				
Jacob Oden; ATH	Detroit, Michigan	Harper Woods High School	6 ft 1 in (1.85 m)	188 lb (85 kg)	Feb 2, 2023
Jacob Oden; ATH	Recruit ratings: Rivals: 247Sports: ESPN:				
Hogan Hansen; TE	Medina, Washington	Bellevue High School	6 ft 6 in (1.98 m)	220 lb (100 kg)	Dec 8, 2022
Hogan Hansen; TE	Recruit ratings: Rivals: 247Sports: ESPN:				
I'Marion Stewart; WR	Chicago, Illinois	Kenwood Academy	6 ft 1 in (1.85 m)	180 lb (82 kg)	Jun 16, 2023
I'Marion Stewart; WR	Recruit ratings: Rivals: 247Sports: ESPN:				
Mason Curtis; ATH	Nashville, Tennessee	The Ensworth School	6 ft 4 in (1.93 m)	200 lb (91 kg)	Jun 27, 2022
Mason Curtis; ATH	Recruit ratings: Rivals: 247Sports: ESPN:				
Jo'Ziah Edmond; CB	Indianapolis, Indiana	NorthWood High School	6 ft 1 in (1.85 m)	180 lb (82 kg)	Aug 1, 2023
Jo'Ziah Edmond; CB	Recruit ratings: Rivals: 247Sports: ESPN:				
Devon Baxter; EDGE	Clinton, Maryland	Gwynn Park High School	6 ft 6 in (1.98 m)	225 lb (102 kg)	Jun 19, 2023
Devon Baxter; EDGE	Recruit ratings: Rivals: 247Sports: ESPN:				
Jeremiah Beasley; LB	Belleville, Michigan	Belleville High School	6 ft 1 in (1.85 m)	210 lb (95 kg)	Jun 28, 2023
Jeremiah Beasley; LB	Recruit ratings: Rivals: 247Sports: ESPN:				
Luke Hamilton; OT	Avon, Ohio	Avon High School	6 ft 5 in (1.96 m)	200 lb (91 kg)	Nov 27, 2022
Luke Hamilton; OT	Recruit ratings: Rivals: 247Sports: ESPN:				
Cole Sullivan; LB	Pittsburgh, Pennsylvania	Central Catholic High School	6 ft 3 in (1.91 m)	200 lb (91 kg)	May 12, 2023
Cole Sullivan; LB	Recruit ratings: Rivals: 247Sports: ESPN:				
Ted Hammond; DL	Cincinnati, Ohio	St. Xavier High School	6 ft 5 in (1.96 m)	258 lb (117 kg)	Jan 25, 2023
Ted Hammond; DL	Recruit ratings: Rivals: 247Sports: ESPN:				
Owen Wafle; EDGE	Middletown, New Jersey	Hun School of Princeton	6 ft 1 in (1.85 m)	290 lb (130 kg)	Jun 11, 2023
Owen Wafle; EDGE	Recruit ratings: Rivals: 247Sports: ESPN:				
Ben Roebuck; OT	Youngstown, Ohio	St. Edward High School	6 ft 7 in (2.01 m)	320 lb (150 kg)	Mar 22, 2023
Ben Roebuck; OT	Recruit ratings: Rivals: 247Sports: ESPN:				
Jake Guarnera; IOL	Ponte Vedra Beach, Florida	Ponte Vedra High School	6 ft 4 in (1.93 m)	290 lb (130 kg)	Apr 28, 2023
Jake Guarnera; IOL	Recruit ratings: Rivals: 247Sports: ESPN:				
Micah Ka'apana; RB	Waianae, Hawaii	Bishop Gorman High School	5 ft 11 in (1.80 m)	195 lb (88 kg)	Jun 17, 2023
Micah Ka'apana; RB	Recruit ratings: Rivals: 247Sports: ESPN:				
Dominic Nichols; EDGE	Frederick, Maryland	Oakdale High School	6 ft 5 in (1.96 m)	252 lb (114 kg)	Jun 25, 2023
Dominic Nichols; EDGE	Recruit ratings: Rivals: 247Sports: ESPN:				
Channing Goodwin; WR	Charlotte, North Carolina	Providence Day School	6 ft 1 in (1.85 m)	180 lb (82 kg)	May 7, 2023
Channing Goodwin; WR	Recruit ratings: Rivals: 247Sports: ESPN:				
Deyvid Palepale; DL	Lancaster, Pennsylvania	Manheim Township High School	6 ft 3 in (1.91 m)	305 lb (138 kg)	Dec 9, 2023
Deyvid Palepale; DL	Recruit ratings: Rivals: 247Sports: ESPN:				
Manuel Beigel; DL	Frankfurt, Germany	Choate Rosemary Hall	6 ft 4 in (1.93 m)	282 lb (128 kg)	Jul 16, 2022
Manuel Beigel; DL	Recruit ratings: Rivals: 247Sports: ESPN:				
Jeremiah Lowe; CB	Lexington, Kentucky	Frederick Douglass High School	5 ft 11 in (1.80 m)	170 lb (77 kg)	Aug 10, 2023
Jeremiah Lowe; CB	Recruit ratings: Rivals: 247Sports: ESPN:				
Zach Ludwig; LB	South Park, Pennsylvania	South Park High School	6 ft 3 in (1.91 m)	202 lb (92 kg)	Nov 29, 2022
Zach Ludwig; LB	Recruit ratings: Rivals: 247Sports:				
Overall recruit ranking: Rivals: 12 247Sports: 15
Note: In many cases, Scout, Rivals, 247Sports, On3, and ESPN may conflict in their listings of height and weight.; In these cases, the average was taken. ESPN grades are on a 100-point scale.; Sources: "2024 Michigan football commitments". Rivals.; "2024 Team Ranking". Rivals.com.; "2024 Michigan football commitments". 247Sports.

=== Incoming transfers ===
Michigan incoming transfers
Name	Pos.	Height	Weight	Year	Hometown	Previous team
Jaishawn Barham	LB	6'4"	233	JR	District Heights, Maryland	Maryland
Josh Priebe	OL	6'5"	310	GS	Niles, Michigan	Northwestern
Dominic Zvada	K	6’3”	174	JR	Chandler, Arizona	Arkansas State
C.J. Charleston	WR	6’0”	190	GS	Gates Mills, Ohio	Youngstown State
Aamir Hall	DB	6’1”	200	GS	Baltimore, Maryland	Albany
Wesley Walker	DB	6’1”	200	GS	Lewisburg, Tennessee	Tennessee
Jaden Mangham	DB	6’2”	185	JR	Beverly Hills, Michigan	Michigan State
Ricky Johnson	DB	6’1”	180	GS	Houston, Texas	UNLV
Dan Rosenberg	LS	6'0"	242	SO	Wakefield, Massachusetts	Holy Cross

== Awards and honors ==
All-American
Player	AP	AFCA	FWAA	TSN	WCFF	ESPN	CBS	Athletic	USAT	SI	FOX	Designation
Mason Graham	1	1	1	1	1	1	1	1	1	1	-	Unanimous
Dominic Zvada	2			1		1	2	1	2	Hon.	-	
Will Johnson	3	2			2		2				-	
Colston Loveland			2								-	
Kenneth Grant	3										-	
The NCAA recognizes a selection to all five of the AP, AFCA, FWAA, TSN and WCFF first teams for unanimous selections and three of five for consensus selections. Reference:

Weekly awards
Player	Award	Date awarded	Ref.
Dominic Zvada	Co-Big Ten Special Teams Player of the Week	September 2, 2024	
Josaiah Stewart	Big Ten Defensive Player of the Week	September 23, 2024	
Tommy Doman	Big Ten Special Teams Player of the Week	September 23, 2024	
Kalel Mullings	Co-Big Ten Offensive Player of the Week	September 30, 2024	
Dominic Zvada	Big Ten Special Teams Player of the Week	September 30, 2024	
Dominic Zvada	Big Ten Special Teams Player of the Week	November 11, 2024	
Dominic Zvada	Co-Big Ten Special Teams Player of the Week	December 2, 2024	

Individual awards
Player	Award	Ref.
Dominic Zvada	Bakken–Andersen Kicker of the Year	

All-Big Ten
Player	Position	Coaches	Media
Mason Graham	DL	1	1
Dominic Zvada	K	1	1
William Wagner	LS	1	Hon.
Kenneth Grant	DL	2	2
Colston Loveland	TE	2	2
Josaiah Stewart	DL	2	2
Will Johnson	DB	Hon.	2
Kalel Mullings	RB	Hon.	3
Josh Priebe	OL	Hon.	3
Giovanni El-Hadi	OL	Hon.	Hon.
Ernest Hausmann	LB	Hon.	Hon.
Myles Hinton	OL	Hon.	Hon.
Zeke Berry	DB	Hon.	–
Donovan Edwards	RB	Hon.	–
Derrick Moore	DL	Hon.	–
Semaj Morgan	KR	Hon.	–
Hon. = Honorable mention. Reference:

== Statistics ==
=== Offensive statistics ===
Rushing
Player	GP	Att	Net Yards	Yds/Att	TD	Long
Kalel Mullings	12	185	948	5.1	12	63
Donovan Edwards	12	128	589	4.6	4	41
Alex Orji	11	57	269	4.7	1	29
Jordan Marshall	5	31	120	3.9	0	24
Benjamin Hall	8	29	72	2.5	0	14
Semaj Morgan	11	6	32	5.3	0	13
Fredrick Moore	13	5	28	5.6	0	15
Tavierre Dunlap	12	1	20	20.0	1	20

Passing
Player	GP	Att	Comp	Comp %	Yds	TD	Int	Long
Davis Warren	9	209	134	61.1%	1,199	7	9	36
Jack Tuttle	2	50	30	60.0%	306	1	2	29
Alex Orji	11	47	25	53.2%	150	3	2	16
Donovan Edwards	12	1	1	100.0%	23	1	0	23

Receiving
Player	GP	Recp	Yds	Yds/Recp	Yds/GP	TD	Long
Colston Loveland	10	56	582	10.4	58.2	5	36
Tyler Morris	11	23	248	10.8	22.5	2	28
Semaj Morgan	11	27	139	5.2	12.6	1	31
Fredrick Moore	13	11	128	11.6	9.8	1	20
Marlin Klein	13	13	108	8.3	8.3	0	33
Peyton O'Leary	13	10	102	10.2	7.8	1	22
Donovan Edwards	12	18	83	4.6	6.9	1	15
Hogan Hansen	10	7	78	11.1	7.8	1	20
Kendrick Bell	13	7	70	10.0	5.4	0	16
Kalel Mullings	12	6	35	5.8	2.9	0	12
Amorion Walker	5	3	34	11.3	6.8	0	22
Max Bredeson	13	3	24	8.0	1.8	0	15
Benjamin Hall	8	3	12	4.0	1.5	0	7

=== Defensive statistics ===
Player	GP	Solo	Asst	Tot	TFL	Sack	Int	PBU	QBH
Ernest Hausmann	13	54	35	89.0	7.0	2	1	1	2
Jaishawn Barham	13	40	26	66.0	3.5	1	0	2	5
Mason Graham	12	23	22	45.0	7.0	3.5	0	1	3
Makari Paige	12	23	22	45.0	1.0	0	2	4	0
Quinten Johnson	13	27	16	43.0	1.0	0	0	5	0
Aamir Hall	12	25	13	38.0	2.5	1	2	4	0
Zeke Berry	13	27	10	37.0	2.5	0	2	9	2
Jyaire Hill	12	26	9	35.0	5.5	1	1	8	0
Josaiah Stewart	11	22	11	33.0	13.0	8.5	0	0	7
Kenneth Grant	12	18	14	32.0	6.5	3	0	5	3
TJ Guy	13	16	16	32.0	7.0	5.5	0	0	6
Wesley Walker	11	20	12	32.0	1.0	0	1	1	0
Rayshaun Benny	11	15	14	29.0	3.5	1.5	0	2	4
Jimmy Rolder	12	15	11	26.0	1.5	0	0	0	1
Derrick Moore	12	16	7	23.0	6.0	4	0	2	4
Brandyn Hillman	12	13	8	21.0	1.5	1	0	2	0
Will Johnson	6	12	2	14.0	1	0	2	3	1
Cameron Brandt	13	7	6	13.0	4.0	3	0	2	1

=== Special teams statistics ===
Kickoff returns
Player	Returns	Yds	Yds/Rtrn	TD	Long
Jordan Marshall	9	225	25.0	0	63
Keshaun Harris	7	121	17.3	0	20
Kalel Mullings	3	74	24.7	0	27
Joe Taylor	4	69	17.3	0	29

Punt returns
Player	Returns	Yds	Yds/Rtrn	TD	Long
Semaj Morgan	9	100	11.1	0	22
Tyler Morris	5	38	7.6	0	19

Punts
Player	Punts	Yds	Yds/Punt	Long	50+	Inside 20	T'back
Tommy Doman	49	2,088	42.6	68	10	15	3
Hudson Hollenbeck	6	277	46.2	69	2	2	1

Field goals
Player	FGs	Att	Long	Blocked
Dominic Zvada	21	22	56	1

== 2025 NFL draft ==
Michigan had three players selected in the first round of the 2025 NFL draft, tying a program record set in the 1995 NFL draft and matched in the 2001 NFL draft.

Round	Pick	Player	Position	NFL team
1	5	Mason Graham	DT	Cleveland Browns
1	10	Colston Loveland	TE	Chicago Bears
1	13	Kenneth Grant	DT	Miami Dolphins
2	47	Will Johnson	CB	Arizona Cardinals
3	90	Josaiah Stewart	EDGE	Los Angeles Rams
6	188	Kalel Mullings	RB	Tennessee Titans
6	191	Myles Hinton	OT	Philadelphia Eagles
