= Davis Warren =

American football player (born 2002)

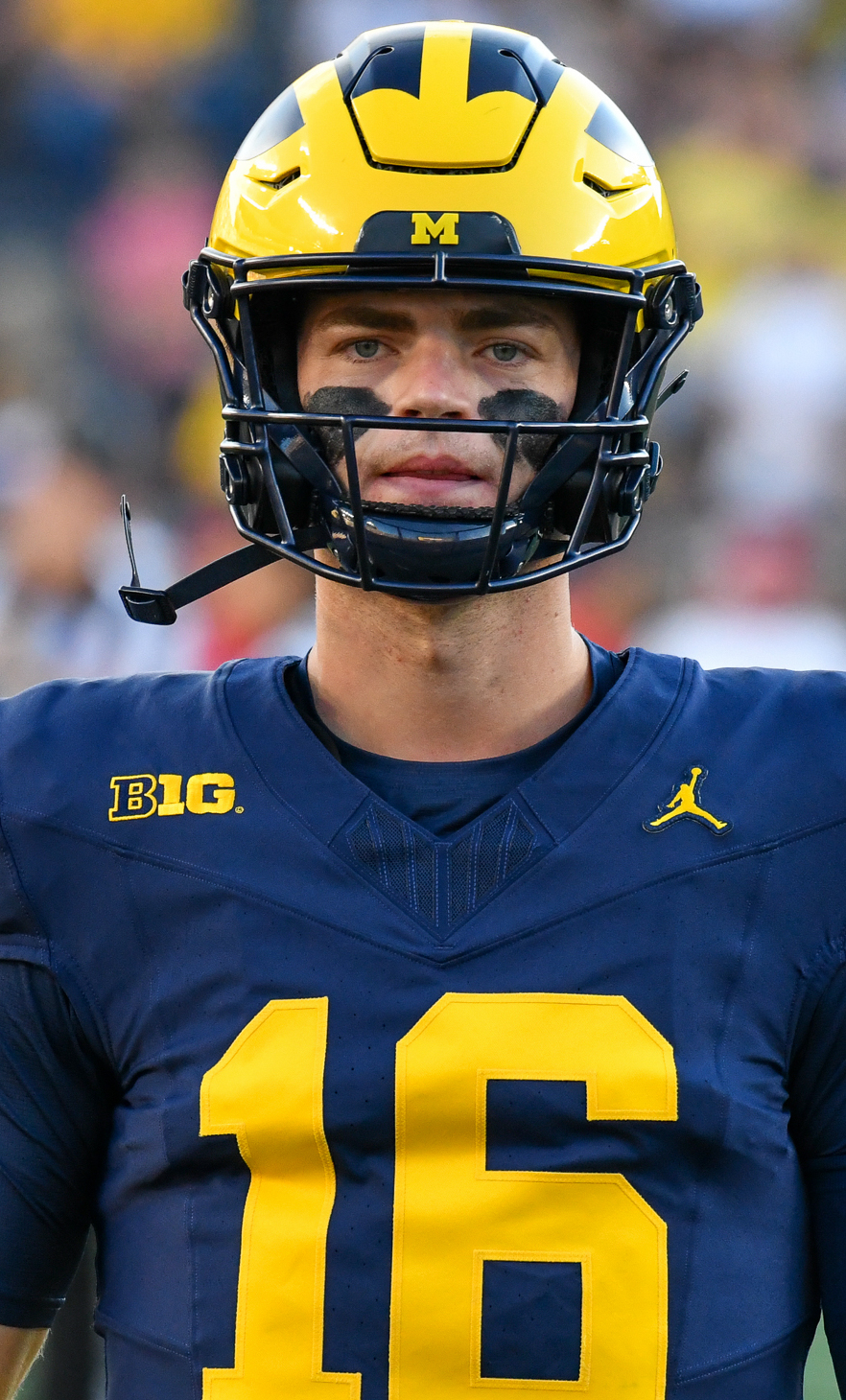
- Warren with the Michigan Wolverines in 2024

No. 8 – Stanford Cardinal
- Position: Quarterback
- Class: Graduate

Personal information
- Born: January 9, 2002 (age 24); Los Angeles, California, U.S.
- Listed height: 6 ft 2 in (1.88 m)
- Listed weight: 195 lb (88 kg)

Career information
- High school: Peddie School (Hightstown, New Jersey)
- College: Michigan (2021–2025); Stanford (2026–present)

Awards and highlights
- CFP national champion (2023)
- Stats at ESPN

Davis Warren (born January 9, 2002) is an American college football quarterback for the Stanford Cardinal. He previously played for the Michigan Wolverines, winning a national championship as a backup in 2023, and starting nine games for the Wolverines in 2024.

== Early life ==
Warren was born on January 9, 2002, the son of Jeff and Terri Warren. He attended Loyola High School in California, Peddie School in New Jersey, and Suffield Academy in Connecticut, but due to COVID-19 rules he never played for Suffield.

During Warren's junior season of high school he was diagnosed with leukemia. He appeared in four games as a junior, completing 32-of-49 passes for 607 yards, with six touchdowns and one interception. Warren went through five months of therapy in Los Angeles and eventually recovered. He reclassified to the class of 2021, and was a preferred walk-on for the Michigan Wolverines.

== College career ==
=== Michigan ===
==== 2021–2023 seasons ====
In 2021, Warren did not appear in any games but was named the Michigan Scout Team Player of the Year. In 2022, he completed five of nine pass attempts for 89 yards and rushed three times for 30 yards. After the 2022 season Warren was placed on scholarship by the Wolverines. In 2023, he attempted five passes with no completions and one interception as he won a national championship with Michigan.

==== 2024 season ====
Heading into the 2024 season, Warren competed for the starting quarterback job with Alex Orji and Jack Tuttle. In Michigan's 2024 spring game, Warren was named a starting quarterback for Michigan’s split squad match-up, opposite Alex Orji. He made a push for the starting quarterback position, completing six of nine pass attempts for 142 yards and two touchdowns as his Maize team beat the Blue team.

For the first game of the 2024 season versus Fresno State, Warren earned the starting quarterback job, and his first collegiate start. He completed 15 of 25 passes for 118 yards, with an interception and his first career touchdown pass, an 18-yard completion to Colston Loveland. In the week two against No. 3 Texas, Warren was 22 of 33 for a career-high 204 yards, throwing a touchdown and two interceptions. In week three versus Arkansas State, he completed 11 of 14 passes with no touchdowns and all three incompletions resulting in interceptions.

Following being benched in the second half in week three, Alex Orji replaced Warren as Michigan’s starting quarterback for the week four contest versus USC, the start of Big Ten Conference play. Warren had two touchdowns and six interceptions in his three starts. After not seeing playing time since week three, Warren earned his fourth start of the season versus Michigan State in week nine. He completed 13 of 19 pass attempts for 123 yards, including a touchdown pass to Colston Loveland and zero turnovers as he led Michigan in defeating the rival Spartans 24-17.

In week 10 versus No. 1 Oregon, Warren earned his second consecutive start and fifth of the season. He completed 12 of 21 pass attempts for 164 yards, including two touchdowns and zero turnovers, as Michigan lost 38–17 to the Ducks. It was his first career game throwing multiple touchdown passes. In week 11 against No. 8 Indiana, Warren fell to 3–3 on the season as the starting quarterback, as Michigan lost 20–15 to the Hoosiers. Warren completed 16 of 32 passes for 137 yards, with zero touchdowns, zero turnovers, and negative 17 rushing yards on a self-imposed fumble on third and goal in the first quarter. Following a bye week, in week 13 versus Northwestern, Warren completed a career-high 26 of 35 pass attempts for 195 yards, including a touchdown and an interception, as Michigan defeated the Wildcats 50–6.

In the last week of the regular season against No. 2 Ohio State, Warren completed nine of 16 pass attempts for 62 yards, with zero touchdowns and two interceptions. Michigan won 13–10 over their arch-rival. On December 31, Warren started his ninth game in the ReliaQuest Bowl, but injured his knee in the third quarter, leaving the game with Michigan leading 16–10. He departed completing nine of 12 passes for 73 yards and a touchdown, as Michigan went on to defeat No. 11 Alabama for a second consecutive season in a bowl game. Warren finished 6–3 as the Wolverines starting quarterback in 2024.

==== 2025 season ====
In January 2025, Warren announced he would return for a fifth season, but that he suffered a torn ACL in the 2024 ReliaQuest Bowl and would miss the entire year.

=== Stanford ===
==== 2026 season ====
On January 7, 2026, Warren transferred to play for Stanford. On August 20, he was named as the team's starting quarterback entering the regular season.

=== Statistics ===
Year	Team	Games			Passing								Rushing			
Year	Team	GP	GS	Record	Cmp	Att	Pct	Yds	Y/A	TD	Int	Rtg	Att	Yds	Avg	TD
2021	Michigan	0	0	—	Redshirted (redshirt)											
2022	Michigan	5	0	—	5	9	55.6	89	9.9	0	0	138.6	3	30	10.0	0
2023	Michigan	3	0	—	0	5	0.0	0	0.0	0	1	–40.0	2	–4	–2.0	0
2024	Michigan	9	9	6–3	134	209	64.1	1,199	5.7	7	9	114.7	17	–22	–1.3	0
2025	Michigan	0	0	—	Medical redshirt											
2026	Stanford	9	9	4–5	186	308	60.4	2,203	7.2	14	3	133.9	26	–50	–1.9	0
Career		26	18	10−8	325	531	61.2	3,491	6.6	21	13	124.6	48	–46	–1.0	0
