= Alex Orji =

American football player (born 2003)

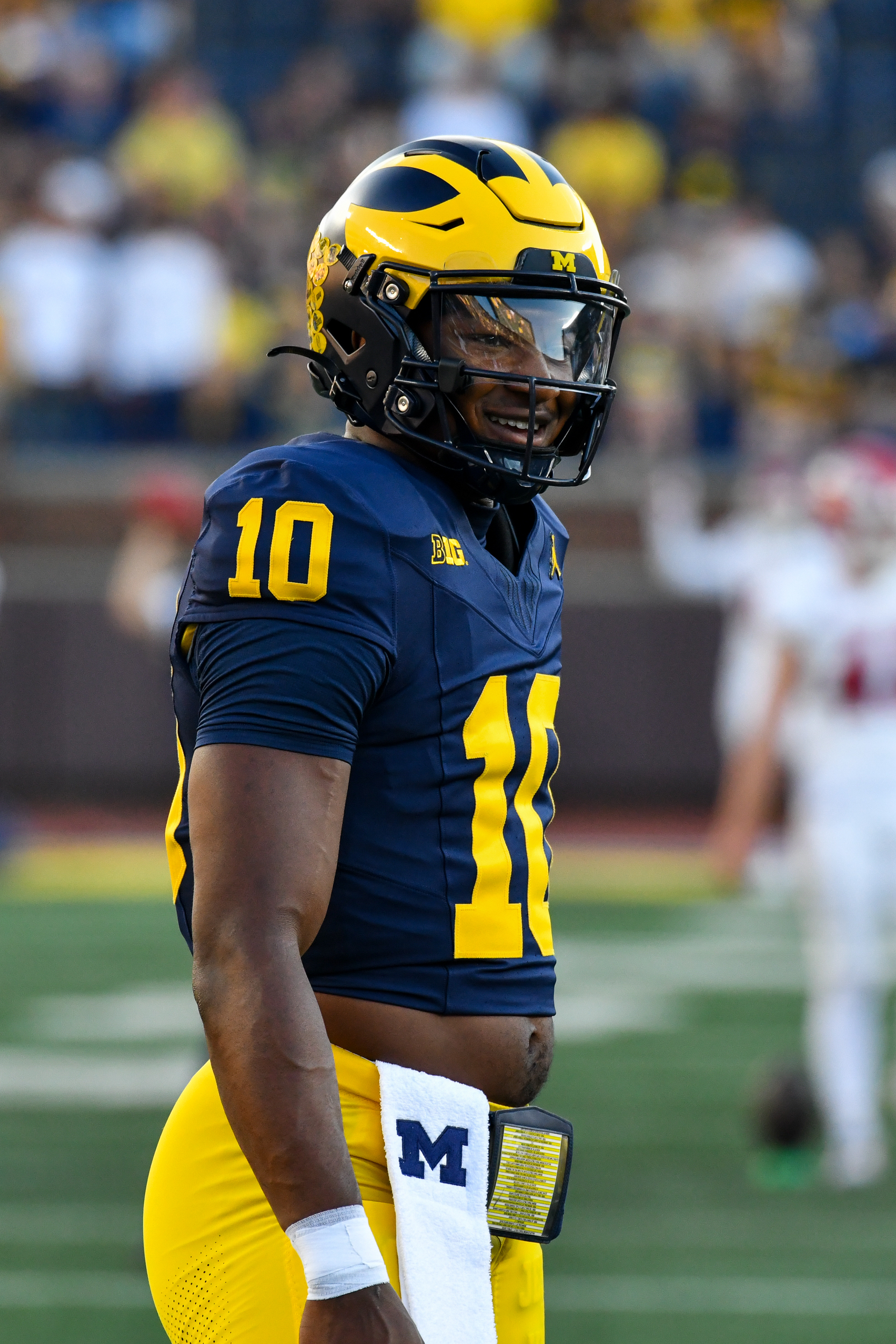
- Orji with the Michigan Wolverines in 2024

No. 1 – UNLV Rebels
- Position: Quarterback
- Class: Redshirt Senior

Personal information
- Born: November 10, 2003 (age 22)
- Listed height: 6 ft 3 in (1.91 m)
- Listed weight: 240 lb (109 kg)

Career information
- High school: Sachse (Sachse, Texas)
- College: Michigan (2022–2024); UNLV (2025–present)

Awards and highlights
- CFP national champion (2023)
- Stats at ESPN

Alexander Orji (born November 10, 2003) is an American college football quarterback for the UNLV Rebels. He previously played for the Michigan Wolverines, where he won a national championship in 2023 as a backup, and started three games in 2024.

== Early life ==
Orji attended Sachse High School in Sachse, Texas. In two years as a starter, he completed 226 of 436 passes for 3,467 yards and 38 touchdowns and rushed for 2,113 yards and 39 touchdowns. Orji was rated as a three-star recruit by 247Sports, and a four-star recruit by ESPN, which ranked him No. 251 overall. He originally committed to play college football for Virginia Tech, but de-committed from the Hokies and signed with the Michigan Wolverines.

== College career ==
=== Michigan ===
==== Freshman and sophomore seasons (2022–2023) ====
In 2022, Orji enrolled at the University of Michigan. As a true freshman, he rushed six times for 37 yards and two touchdowns and completed his only pass attempt for five yards. Orji scored his first career touchdown in his first career game, versus Colorado State on September 3, 2022.

In 2023, Orji was J. J. McCarthy’s back-up, finishing Michigan’s national championship season with 15 rushes for 86 yards and a touchdown. He did not attempt a pass. In week 8, Orji carried the ball five times for 27 yards and a touchdown in a win over rival Michigan State. In the week 13 victory versus Ohio State he rushed twice for 22 yards, also rushing twice for 15 yards in the national championship game victory versus the Washington Huskies.

==== Junior season (2024) ====
In 2024, Orji entered his junior season as the favorite to replace McCarthy as Michigan’s starting quarterback, competing with Jack Tuttle, Davis Warren and Jayden Denegal. For the first game of the 2024 season versus Fresno State, Orji was named a back-up to Warren and threw his first collegiate touchdown pass, a three yard reception by Donovan Edwards, while also rushing five times for 32 yards. In week 3 versus Arkansas State, Orji replaced Warren and threw his second touchdown of the season to secure Michigan’s win.

In week 4 versus USC, Sherrone Moore named Orji the starting quarterback for the start of Big Ten Conference play; his first collegiate start. He led the Wolverines to a 27–24 victory versus the No. 11 ranked Trojans, completing seven of 12 passes for 32 yards and rushing for 43 yards. In week 5 against Minnesota, Orji made his second career start, leading Michigan to a 27–24 win in consecutive weeks and retaining the Little Brown Jug for the Wolverines. He was 10 of 18 for 86 yards, with a touchdown and his first career interception. In week 6 versus Washington, Orji was benched after the first quarter in place of Tuttle after Michigan quickly went down two scores. Tuttle went on to be named the starting quarterback the following game, supplanting Orji as Michigan’s third starting quarterback in 2024. In week 9, Warren earned his fourth start of the season versus Michigan State. Orji served as the change of pace quarterback, leading the team with 64 rushing yards and had a touchdown run for a second consecutive season against the Spartans in the 24–17 win.

On December 13, 2024, Orji entered the NCAA transfer portal. In his three years in Ann Arbor, he had a 36–6 team record, won two Big Ten championships, and a national championship. He started three regular season games for the Wolverines in 2024. Despite being in the transfer portal, Orji remained with Michigan for the ReliaQuest Bowl. In the bowl game, Warren started the game but injured his knee in the third quarter, leaving the game with Michigan leading 16-10. Orji entered the game and took over as Michigan went on to win 19-13 against No. 11 Alabama, defeating the Crimson Tide for a second consecutive season in a bowl game.

=== UNLV ===
On January 11, 2025, Orji transferred to the University of Nevada, Las Vegas for his senior season. He will have two years of eligibility remaining after using a redshirt year. On September 6, Orji suffered two major injures during a week 2 win over UCLA. According to head coach Dan Mullen, Orji suffered a grade 3 LCL tear and a severe hamstring injury; both injuries sidelined Orji for the remainder of the season.

=== Statistics ===
Season	Team	Games			Passing								Rushing			
Season	Team	GP	GS	Record	Cmp	Att	Pct	Yds	Avg	TD	Int	Rtg	Att	Yds	Avg	TD
2022	Michigan	3	0	—	1	1	100.0	5	5.0	0	0	142.0	6	37	6.2	2
2023	Michigan	6	0	—	0	0	0.0	0	0.0	0	0	0.0	15	86	5.7	1
2024	Michigan	11	3	2–1	25	47	53.2	150	3.2	3	2	92.6	57	269	4.7	1
2025	UNLV	3	1	1–0	3	3	100.0	37	12.3	0	0	203.6	10	42	4.2	1
Career		21	4	3−1	29	51	56.9	192	3.8	3	2	100.1	88	434	4.9	5

== Personal life ==
Orji has two older brothers, Anfernee and Alston. Anfernee has played for the New Orleans Saints and Tennessee Titans as a linebacker. Alston played linebacker for Vanderbilt and Campbell.
