= Kenneth Grant (American football) =

American football player (born 2003)

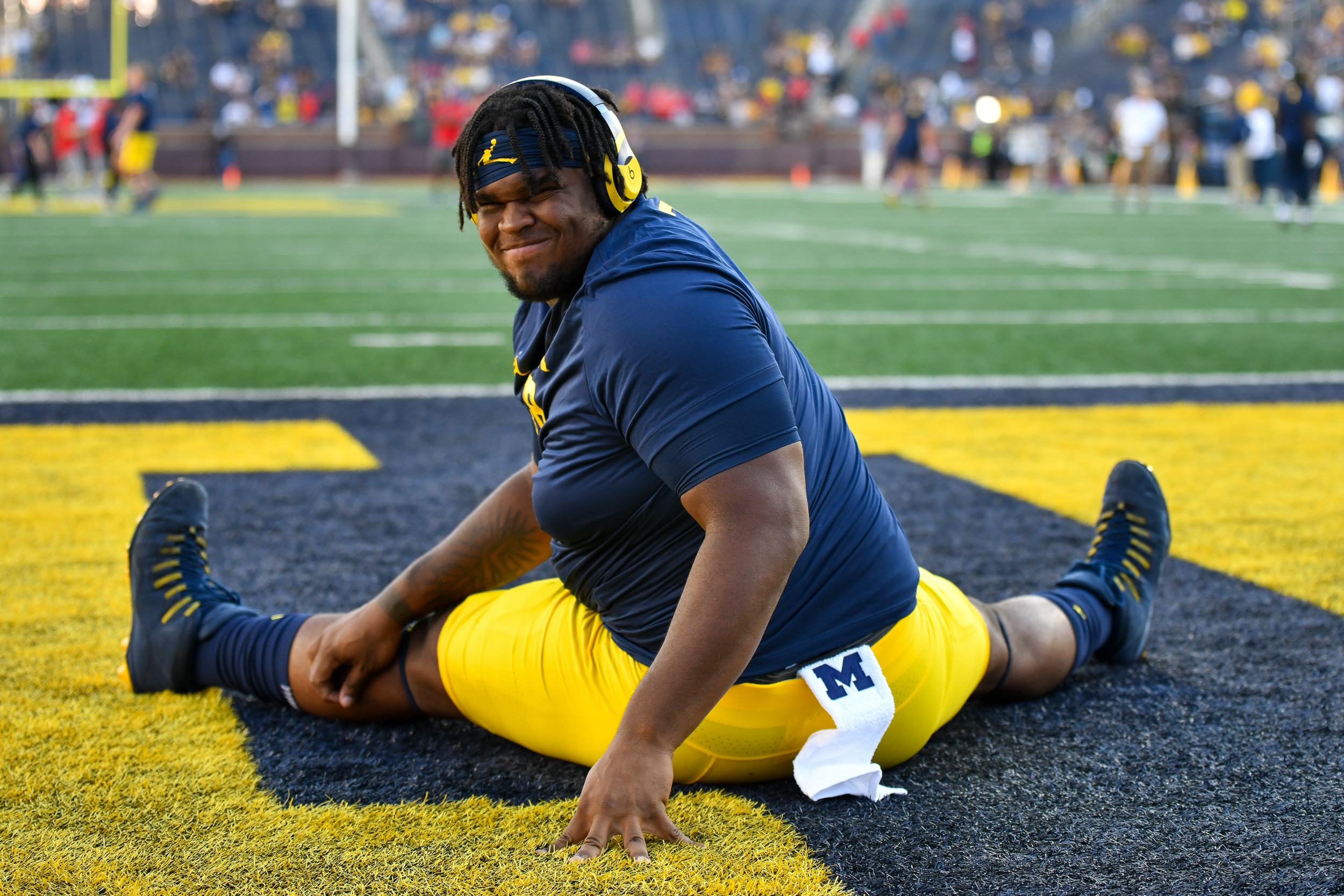
- Grant with the Michigan Wolverines in 2024

No. 78 – Miami Dolphins
- Position: Defensive tackle
- Roster status: Active

Personal information
- Born: October 27, 2003 (age 23); Merrillville, Indiana, U.S.
- Listed height: 6 ft 3 in (1.91 m)
- Listed weight: 326 lb (148 kg)

Career information
- High school: Merrillville (IN)
- College: Michigan (2022–2024)
- NFL draft: 2025: 1st round, 13th overall pick

Career history
- Miami Dolphins (2025–present)

Awards and highlights
- CFP national champion (2023); Third-team All-American (2024); 2× second-team All-Big Ten (2023, 2024)

Career NFL statistics as of Week 7, 2026
- Total tackles: 34
- Sacks: 2
- Pass deflections: 1
- Stats at Pro Football Reference

Kenneth Grant (born October 27, 2003) is an American professional football defensive tackle for the Miami Dolphins of the National Football League (NFL). He played college football for the Michigan Wolverines, winning a national championship in 2023 and earning All-American honors in 2024. Grant was selected with the 13th overall pick by the Dolphins in the first round of the 2025 NFL draft.

== Early life ==
Grant was born on October 27, 2003, in Merrillville, Indiana, the son of Kenneth Grant Sr. and Ewana Chatman. He attended Merrillville High School, where he played football as an offensive and defensive lineman. He also competed in the shot put for the track and field team.

As a senior, he totaled 38 tackles, 14.5 tackles for loss, 6.5 sacks and blocked eight kicks (four field goal attempts, two punts and two extra-point attempts), leading Merrillville to an undefeated regular season and a 12–1 overall record. Grant was rated as a four-star recruit, the No. 3 ranked player in the state of Indiana, and the No. 102 overall ranked high school player in the country in 2022.

== College career ==
=== Freshman season (2022) ===
Grant committed to the University of Michigan in September 2021, and enrolled in July 2022. In the 2022 season, Grant appeared in all 14 games on special teams and defensive line. Michigan coach Jim Harbaugh called Grant "a gift from the football gods." In August 2022, he was included on Bruce Feldman's annual list of college football "freaks". He finished his freshman season with eight tackles.

=== Sophomore season (2023) ===
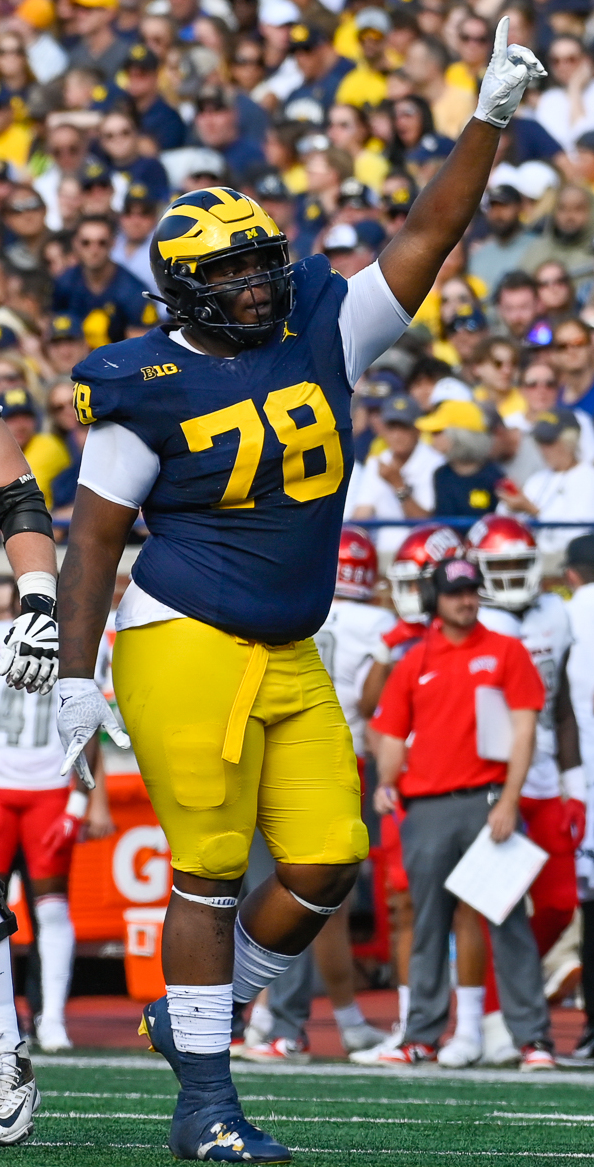
Grant celebrating with the Wolverines in 2023

Entering the 2023 season, Grant dropped from 359 pounds to 339. On September 9, in the second game of the season against UNLV, Grant tallied four tackles, two and a half tackles for a loss, a pass breakup and his first career sacks (1.5). On September 30, Grant had his first career interception versus Nebraska. On November 11, Grant chased down Penn State running back Kaytron Allen from behind to make a tackle and prevent a touchdown. The video of the 339-pound Grant chasing and tackling Allen went viral. Head coach Jim Harbaugh called it "maybe one of the best plays ever."

At the conclusion of the 2023 season, Grant helped the Wolverines win a national championship, Michigan's first since 1997. He was named a second-team All-Big Ten selection, playing in all 15 games and recording 29 tackles, five tackles for a loss, three and a half sacks, one interception, one fumble recovery and five pass breakups.

=== Junior season (2024) ===
Entering his junior season, Grant was ranked as one of the top interior defensive linemen in college football by members of the media. He was widely considered to be a first-round pick in the 2025 NFL draft. In week four against the USC Trojans, Grant recorded two tackles, recovered a fumble and had his first sack of the season. In week five against Minnesota, he had two tackles, a batted ball and a sack. In week nine versus Michigan State, Grant had two tackles, including one for a loss and a fumble recovery as Michigan defeated the Spartans 24–17. In week eleven against Indiana, he recorded his 12th career pass breakup. In doing so, Grant moved ahead of Ryan Van Bergen for the most pass breakups all-time for a defensive lineman in Michigan football history.

Following the season, Grant was again given second-team All-Big Ten honors, and was selected as a third-team All-American by the Associated Press. Grant started all twelve regular season games as a junior, ranking second on the team with five pass breakups, recording 32 tackles, 6.5 tackles for a loss, three sacks, three quarterback hurries and two fumble recoveries.

On December 26, Grant declared for the 2025 NFL draft, foregoing the ReliaQuest Bowl and his senior year. He finished his three-year career at the University of Michigan with a 35–6 team record, two Big Ten championships, two All-Big Ten selections, All-American honors, was a national champion, and finished 3–0 against both rivals, Michigan State and Ohio State. Grant appeared in every game he was a member of the Michigan Wolverines, starting 17 games and totaling 69 tackles, 11.5 tackles for a loss, 6.5 sacks, three fumble recoveries and an interception.

== Professional career ==
Pre-draft measurables
Height	Weight	Arm length	Hand span	Wingspan	40-yard dash	10-yard split	20-yard split	20-yard shuttle	Three-cone drill	Vertical jump	Broad jump	Bench press
6 ft 3 5/8 in (1.92 m)	331 lb (150 kg)	33 1/2 in (0.85 m)	10 1/8 in (0.26 m)	6 ft 10 5/8 in (2.10 m)	5.07 s	1.72 s	3.01 s	4.76 s	7.65 s	31.0 in (0.79 m)	8 ft 9 1/2 in (2.68 m)	27 reps
All values from NFL Combine/Pro Day

Grant was selected with the 13th overall pick by the Miami Dolphins in the first round of the 2025 NFL draft. He was the second defensive tackle taken in the draft behind collegiate teammate Mason Graham (fourth defensive lineman).

== NFL career statistics ==
=== Regular season ===
Year	Team	Games		Tackles					Interceptions						Fumbles				
Year	Team	GP	GS	Cmb	Solo	Ast	Sck	TFL	Int	Yds	Avg	Lng	TD	PD	FF	Fmb	FR	Yds	TD
2025	MIA	17	5	33	15	18	2.0	2	0	0	0.0	0	0	1	0	0	0	0	0
Career		17	5	33	15	18	2.0	2	0	0	0.0	0	0	1	0	0	0	0	0
