= Mason Graham =

American football player (born 2003)

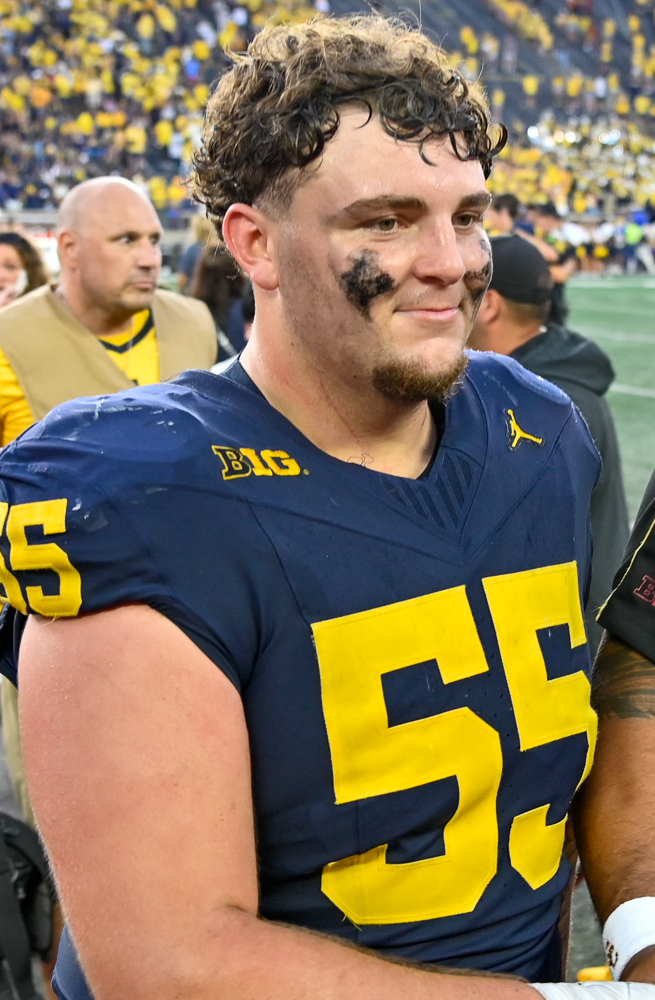
- Graham with the Michigan Wolverines in 2024

No. 94 – Cleveland Browns
- Position: Defensive tackle
- Roster status: Active

Personal information
- Born: September 2, 2003 (age 23); Mission Viejo, California, U.S.
- Listed height: 6 ft 4 in (1.93 m)
- Listed weight: 315 lb (143 kg)

Career information
- High school: Servite (Anaheim, California)
- College: Michigan (2022–2024)
- NFL draft: 2025: 1st round, 5th overall pick

Career history
- Cleveland Browns (2025–present)

Awards and highlights
- PFWA All-Rookie Team (2025); CFP national champion (2023); Unanimous All-American (2024); Second-team All-American (2023); 2× First-team All-Big Ten (2023, 2024); Rose Bowl Defensive MVP (2024); Freshman All-American (2022)

Career NFL statistics as of Week 3, 2026
- Tackles: 64
- Sacks: 4.5
- Pass deflections: 4
- Stats at Pro Football Reference

Mason Graham (born September 2, 2003) is an American professional football defensive tackle for the Cleveland Browns of the National Football League (NFL). He was a two-time All-American playing college football for the Michigan Wolverines, including unanimous All-American honors in 2024. In 2023, he won a national championship and was the Rose Bowl defensive MVP. Graham was selected by the Browns with the fifth overall pick in the first round of the 2025 NFL draft.

== Early life ==
Graham was born in Mission Viejo, California on September 2, 2003, the son of Allen and Kimberly Graham. He attended Servite High School in Anaheim, California and was a two-way starter for his football team, playing on the defensive line and as a tackle on the offensive line. He was also a star wrestler at Servite.

In December 2021, he was selected by the Los Angeles Times as the High School Football Player of the Year and named an All-American by MaxPreps. As a senior, he recorded 60 tackles, 22 tackles for a loss and 14 sacks on the season. Graham was rated as a four-star recruit, and ranked as the No. 162 overall player in the country.

After watching Michigan play Washington in Ann Arbor on September 16, 2021, Graham committed to the University of Michigan.

== College career ==
=== Freshman season (2022) ===
Graham enrolled at the University of Michigan in 2022, and saw extensive playing time as a true freshman. Graham appeared in all 14 games, totaling 27 tackles and 2.5 sacks. His first career sack came in his first career game, versus Colorado State on September 3, 2022. After the season, he was named to the True Freshman All-America team by Pro Football Focus.

=== Sophomore season (2023) ===
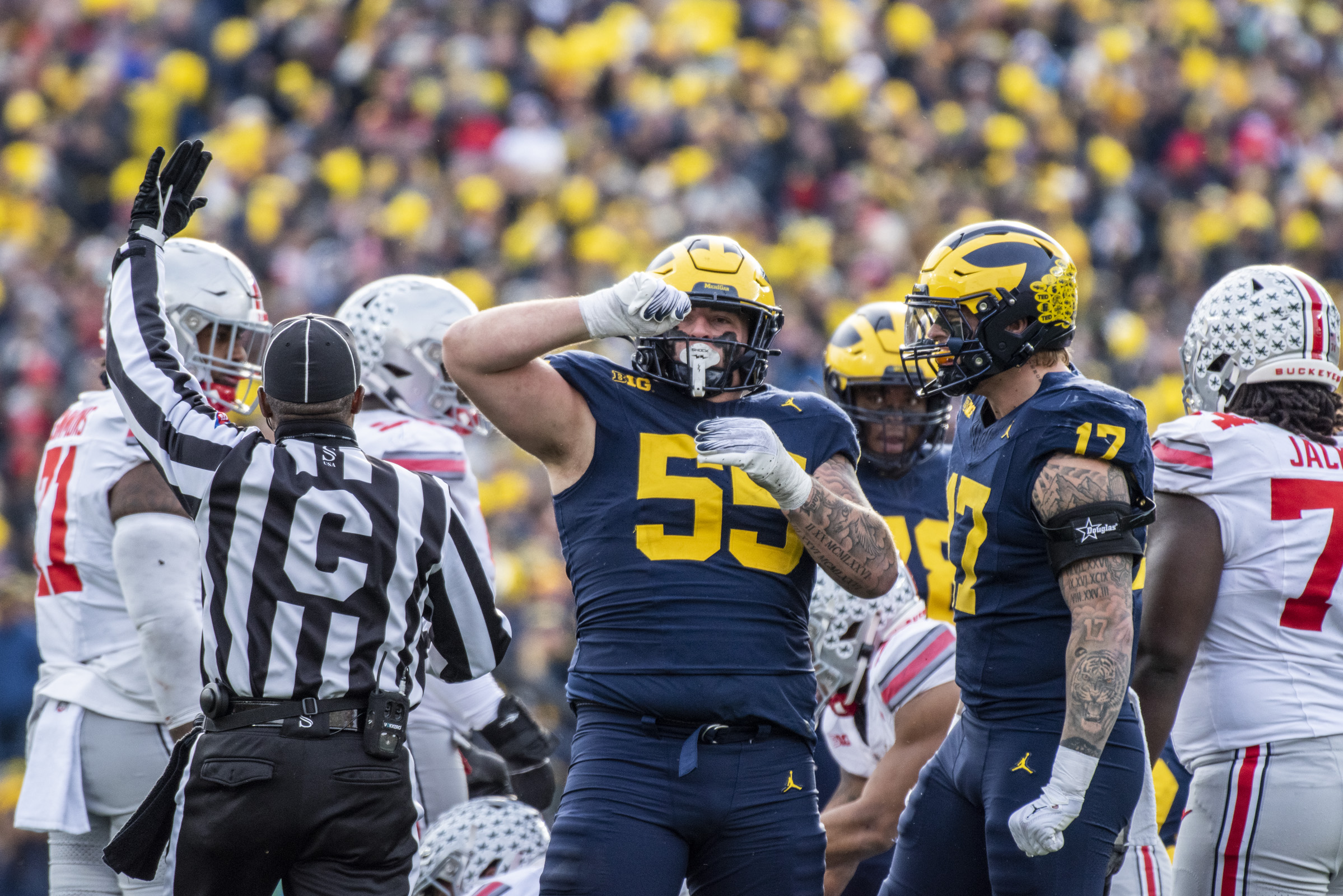
Graham (No. 55) in the 30–24 victory over Ohio State in 2023

In 2023, Graham was named as a second-team All-American by The Sporting News, and a first-team All-Big Ten selection. He appeared in 13 games for the Wolverines, totaling 36 tackles, 7.5 tackles for loss, three sacks, a forced fumble and a fumble recovery. Graham was named the Defensive Player of the Game in the 2024 Rose Bowl, following a four-tackle performance in the victory against Alabama. The following week, Michigan won the 2024 College Football Playoff National Championship in a 34–13 victory over the Washington Huskies.

=== Junior season (2024) ===
Entering his junior season, Mason Graham was ranked as the best interior defensive lineman in college football by the media. He was widely considered to be an early first round pick in the 2025 NFL draft. In week four against the USC Trojans, Graham recorded six tackles and his first sack of the season. In week five against Minnesota, he followed up his performance with four tackles and a career high two sacks. In week six versus Washington, Graham blocked a field goal, had two tackles and his third straight game with a sack. Graham finished the season with 45 tackles, 7 tackles for a loss and 3.5 sacks.

In November 2024, Graham was named as a finalist for the Bronko Nagurski Trophy, given to the best defensive player in college football, and the Outland Trophy, given to the best interior lineman (offensive or defensive). He was the fifth player in Michigan football history to be a finalist for the Nagurski and the sixth for the Outland. Graham also received unanimous All-American honors, named to the first-team by each of the five officially recognized NCAA selectors. (Note: The American Football Coaches Association, Associated Press, Football Writers Association of America, The Sporting News and the Walter Camp Football Foundation) He was the 29th unanimous selection all-time for Michigan Wolverines, and the 27th individual player. (Note: The Michigan Wolverines have had two players who were recognized as unanimous All-Americans twice)

On December 10, Graham declared for the 2025 NFL draft, forgoing the ReliaQuest Bowl and his senior year. Graham finished his three year career at the University of Michigan with a 35–6 team record, two Big Ten championships, All-American honors twice, a Rose Bowl MVP, was a national champion, and finished 3–0 against both rivals, Michigan State and Ohio State. He appeared in 39 games, starting 27 times and recording 108 career tackles, 18 tackles for a loss and nine sacks.

== Professional career ==
Pre-draft measurables
Height	Weight	Arm length	Hand span	Wingspan	Bench press
6 ft 3 1/2 in (1.92 m)	296 lb (134 kg)	32 in (0.81 m)	9 1/8 in (0.23 m)	6 ft 6 1/2 in (1.99 m)	24 reps
All values from NFL Combine

Graham was selected by the Cleveland Browns with the fifth overall pick in the first round of the 2025 NFL draft. The Browns traded down three spots with the Jacksonville Jaguars before selecting him. Graham was the first defensive tackle taken in the draft (second defensive lineman).

Even though Graham suffered a broken rib in the middle of his rookie season, his 8.3% pass rush win rate led all rookies and ranked 20th overall, and he was named to the 2025 PFWA All-Rookie Team.

== Career statistics ==
=== Regular season ===
Year	Team	Games		Tackles					Interceptions						Fumbles				
Year	Team	GP	GS	Cmb	Solo	Ast	Sck	TFL	Int	Yds	Avg	Lng	TD	PD	FF	Fum	FR	Yds	TD
2025	CLE	17	17	49	28	21	0.5	7	0	0	0.0	0	0	4	0	0	0	0	0
2026	CLE	3	3	15	8	7	4.0	6	0	0	0.0	0	0	0	0	0	0	0	0
Career		20	20	64	36	28	4.5	13	0	0	0.0	0	0	4	0	0	0	0	0

=== College statistics ===
Year	Team	Games		Tackles				Fumbles				Interceptions			
Year	Team	GP	GS	Cmb	Solo	Ast	Sck	FF	FR	Yds	TD	Int	Yds	TD	PD
2022	Michigan	14	2	27	14	13	2.5	0	0	0	0	0	0	0	1
2023	Michigan	13	13	36	23	13	3.0	1	1	12	0	0	0	0	1
2024	Michigan	12	12	45	23	22	3.5	0	0	0	0	0	0	0	1
Career		39	27	108	60	48	9.0	1	1	12	0	0	0	0	3
