= Jack Tuttle (American football) =

American football player (born 1999)

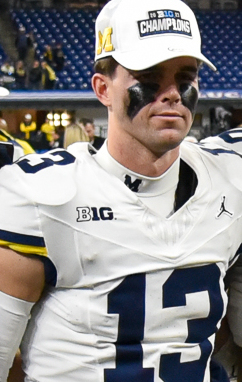
- Tuttle with Michigan after the 2023 Big Ten Championship

No. 14, 13
- Position: Quarterback

Personal information
- Born: April 28, 1999 (age 27)
- Listed height: 6 ft 4 in (1.93 m)
- Listed weight: 210 lb (95 kg)

Career information
- High school: Mission Hills (San Marcos, California)
- College: Utah (2018); Indiana (2019–2022); Michigan (2023–2024)

Awards and highlights
- CFP national champion (2023)

Jack Tuttle (born April 28, 1999) is an American former college football player. He played quarterback for the Indiana Hoosiers, Utah Utes, and Michigan Wolverines. Tuttle was a member of Michigan's national championship team in 2023.

== Early life ==
Tuttle was born in Indianapolis, Indiana. He attended Mission Hills High School in San Marcos, California. As a senior, he completed 69% of his passes for 3,171 yards and 41 touchdowns with four interceptions and rushed 66 times for 207 yards and two touchdowns, earning CIF San Diego Section (SDS) Player of the Year honors while leading his team to a 12–1 record and the SDS Open Division championship game. Tuttle was rated as a four-star recruit, the 7th best quarterback and the 110th overall ranked player in the country. He received scholarship offers from USC, LSU, and Alabama, before ultimately committing to play college football at the University of Utah.

== College career ==
=== Utah ===
During Tuttle's partial season with the Utes in 2018, he did not appear in any games. After the conclusion of the 2018 season, Tuttle decided to enter the NCAA transfer portal.

=== Indiana ===
Tuttle transferred to Indiana University Bloomington. He was granted immediate eligibility. In 2019, Tuttle played in five games where he completed five of 11 passes for 34 yards. In week 4 of the 2020 season, he got his first career start against #18 Wisconsin, where he completed 13 of 22 pass attempts for 130 yards and two touchdowns in a 14–6 win.

Tuttle made his second career start in the 2021 Outback Bowl, where he completed 20 of 45 passing attempts for 201 yards with an interception while also adding 29 yards on the ground in a 26–21 loss to Ole Miss. Tuttle finished the 2020 season going 44 for 72 for 362 yards, two touchdowns, and an interception.

During the 2021 season, Tuttle started two games, completing 45 of his 87 passes for 423 yards and two touchdowns, with five interceptions. In 2022, Tuttle played in just one game completing nine of 12 pass attempts for 81 yards.

After the 2022 season, Tuttle entered the NCAA transfer portal for the second time.

=== Michigan ===
Tuttle transferred to the University of Michigan in 2023. He completed 15 of 17 passes on the season for 130 yards and a touchdown, adding 35 rushing yards. Tuttle won a national championship in 2023 as the Wolverines backup to J. J. McCarthy.

In 2024, Tuttle returned to Michigan after being granted his seventh year of eligibility by the NCAA. In week 6 of the 2024 season versus Washington, Tuttle came into the game after starter Alex Orji was benched in the second quarter. Tuttle completed ten of 19 pass attempts for 98 yards and a touchdown, but threw an interception and fumbled the ball in the fourth quarter, in the 27–17 loss. In week 8 versus Illinois, Tuttle was named Michigan's starting quarterback; his first start for the Wolverines. In his start against Illinois, Tuttle completed 20 of 32 pass attempts for 208 yards, but did not throw a touchdown and had two turnovers, a fumble on a run attempt and an interception in the red zone, as Michigan lost 21–7 to the Fighting Illini. In week 9 versus Michigan State, he did not earn the start and was ruled out of the game.

On October 28, 2024, Tuttle announced his medical retirement from college football, citing multiple concussions and a UCL tear in 2023 that did not fully recover following offseason surgery. He played in two games, with one start for the Wolverines in 2024. He was named an assistant wide receivers coach for the Michigan Wolverines in 2025, but Tuttle opted out of the position in July 2025 before the season started. He chose to pursue a career in the media.

=== Statistics ===
Year	Team	Games			Passing								Rushing			
Year	Team	GP	GS	Record	Comp	Att	Pct	Yards	Avg	TD	Int	Rate	Att	Yards	Avg	TD
2018	Utah	Redshirt														
2019	Indiana	5	0	0−0	6	11	54.5	34	3.1	0	0	80.5	9	20	2.2	0
2020	Indiana	3	2	1−1	44	72	61.1	362	5.0	2	1	109.7	15	37	2.5	0
2021	Indiana	6	2	0−2	45	87	51.7	423	4.9	2	5	88.7	16	17	1.1	0
2022	Indiana	1	1	0−1	9	12	75.0	82	6.8	1	0	159.9	10	8	0.8	0
2023	Michigan	6	0	0−0	15	17	88.2	130	7.6	1	0	171.9	4	35	8.8	0
2024	Michigan	2	1	0−1	30	50	60.0	306	6.1	1	2	110.0	15	4	0.3	0
Career		23	6	1−5	149	249	59.8	1,337	5.4	7	8	107.8	69	121	1.8	0

== Personal life ==
Tuttle's father, Jay Tuttle, was a walk-on kicker for the Indiana Hoosiers.
