= Tyler Morris =

American football wide receiver (born 2003)

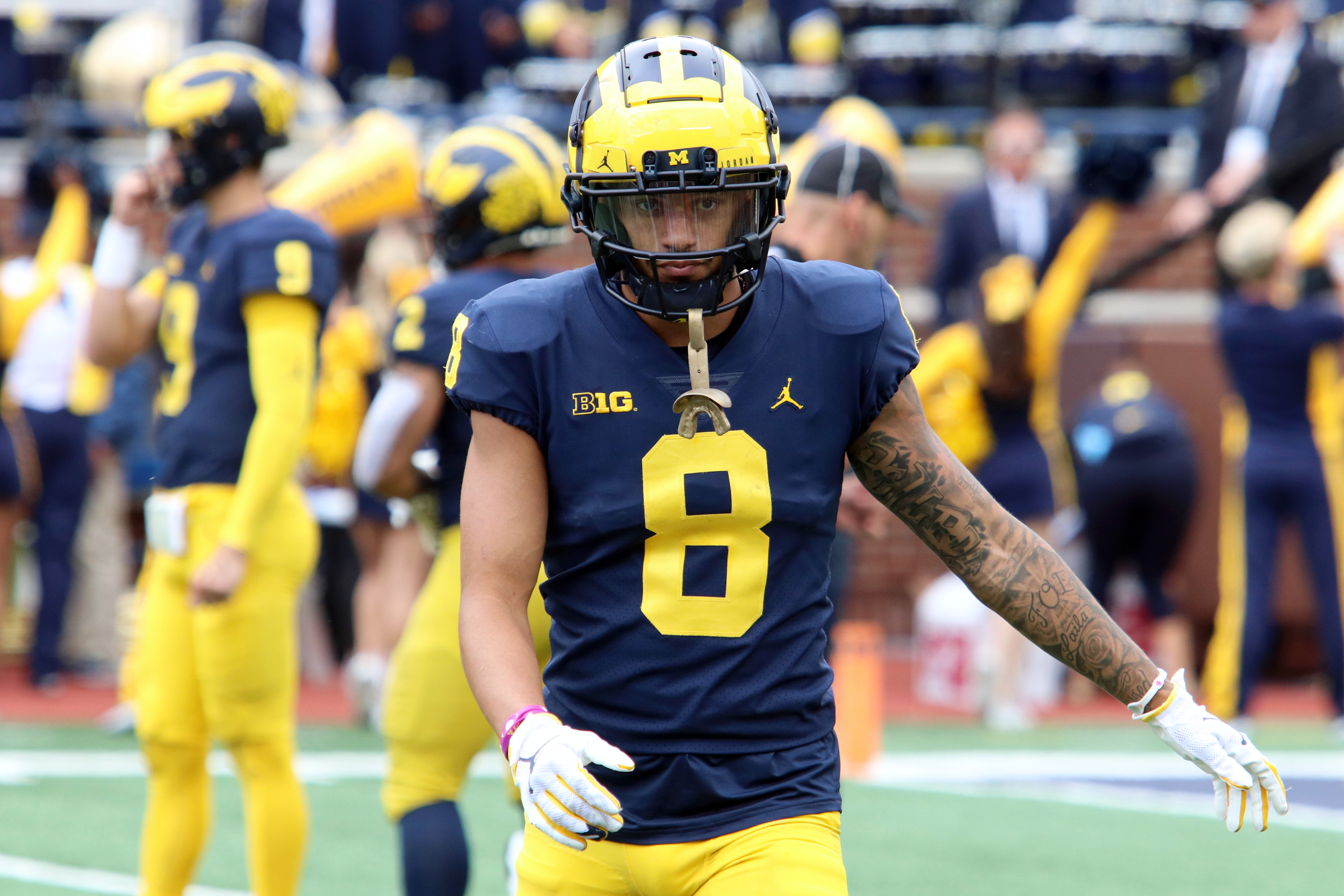
- Morris with the Michigan Wolverines in 2022

Indiana Hoosiers
- Position: Wide receiver
- Class: Senior

Personal information
- Born: November 18, 2003 (age 22)
- Listed height: 5 ft 11 in (1.80 m)
- Listed weight: 185 lb (84 kg)

Career information
- High school: Nazareth Academy (La Grange Park, Illinois)
- College: Michigan (2022–2024); Indiana (2025–present)

Awards and highlights
- 2× CFP national champion (2023, 2025)
- Stats at ESPN

Tyler Morris (born November 18, 2003) is an American college football wide receiver for the Indiana Hoosiers. He previously played for the Michigan Wolverines, where he won a national championship in 2023.

== Early life ==
Morris was born on November 18, 2003. He attended Nazareth Academy in La Grange Park, Illinois, where he was high school teammates with J. J. McCarthy. McCarthy and Morris connected for 68 receptions, 1,237 yards, and 17 touchdowns in Morris’ sophomore season in 2019.

In 2020, Morris missed his junior season due to the COVID-19 pandemic, and tore his ACL in the spring of 2021, missing his entire senior season. He was a four-star recruit, ranked as the No. 18 wide receiver and the No. 104 overall prospect in the nation in 2022.

== College career ==
=== Michigan ===
In 2022, Morris enrolled at the University of Michigan. As a freshman, he saw limited playing time in eight games, tallying three receptions for 25 yards. In 2023, as a sophomore, Morris played wide receiver and returned punts for Michigan’s national championship team. Morris appeared in all 15 games for the Wolverines, finishing the season with 13 receptions for 197 yards and his first career touchdown; a 38-yard touchdown reception thrown by his former high school teammate, J. J. McCarthy, that helped secure a 2024 Rose Bowl victory against Alabama.

In 2024, Morris entered his junior season as Michigan’s No. 1 wide receiver, following the departures of Roman Wilson and Cornelius Johnson to the National Football League (NFL). In week five against Minnesota, Morris caught his first touchdown of the season, an 11-yard reception with an acrobatic dive into the end zone. In week ten versus Oregon, he caught three passes for 38 yards and his second touchdown of the season. Morris finished his junior year with 23 catches for 248 yards and two touchdowns.

On December 3, 2024, he entered the NCAA transfer portal after three seasons with the Michigan Wolverines. In that time, Morris had a 35–6 team record, won two Big Ten championships and a national championship.

=== Indiana ===
On January 4, 2025, Morris transferred to Indiana for his final season. On April 1, 2025, it was announced that Morris suffered a non contact knee injury, and required surgery that would result in him missing the entirety of the season.
