= Mason Curtis =

American football player (born 2005)

No. 25 – Michigan Wolverines
- Position: Safety
- Class: Junior

Personal information
- Born: August 15, 2005 (age 21)
- Listed height: 6 ft 4 in (1.93 m)
- Listed weight: 215 lb (98 kg)

Career information
- High school: The Ensworth School (Nashville, Tennessee)
- College: Michigan (2024–present)
- Stats at ESPN

Mason Curtis (born August 15, 2005) is an American college football safety for the Michigan Wolverines.

== Early life ==
Curtis attended The Ensworth School in Nashville, Tennessee where he played linebacker and safety. He recorded 28 tackles and three interceptions his junior year and 31 tackles with two defensive touchdowns his senior year. He committed to the University of Michigan to play college football.

== College career ==
Curtis played in nine games his true freshman year at Michigan in 2024, recording eight tackles and an interception. He was named the team's Defensive Rookie of the Year. He earned more playing time his sophomore year at Michigan in 2025.
