= Semaj Morgan =

American football wide receiver (born 2005)

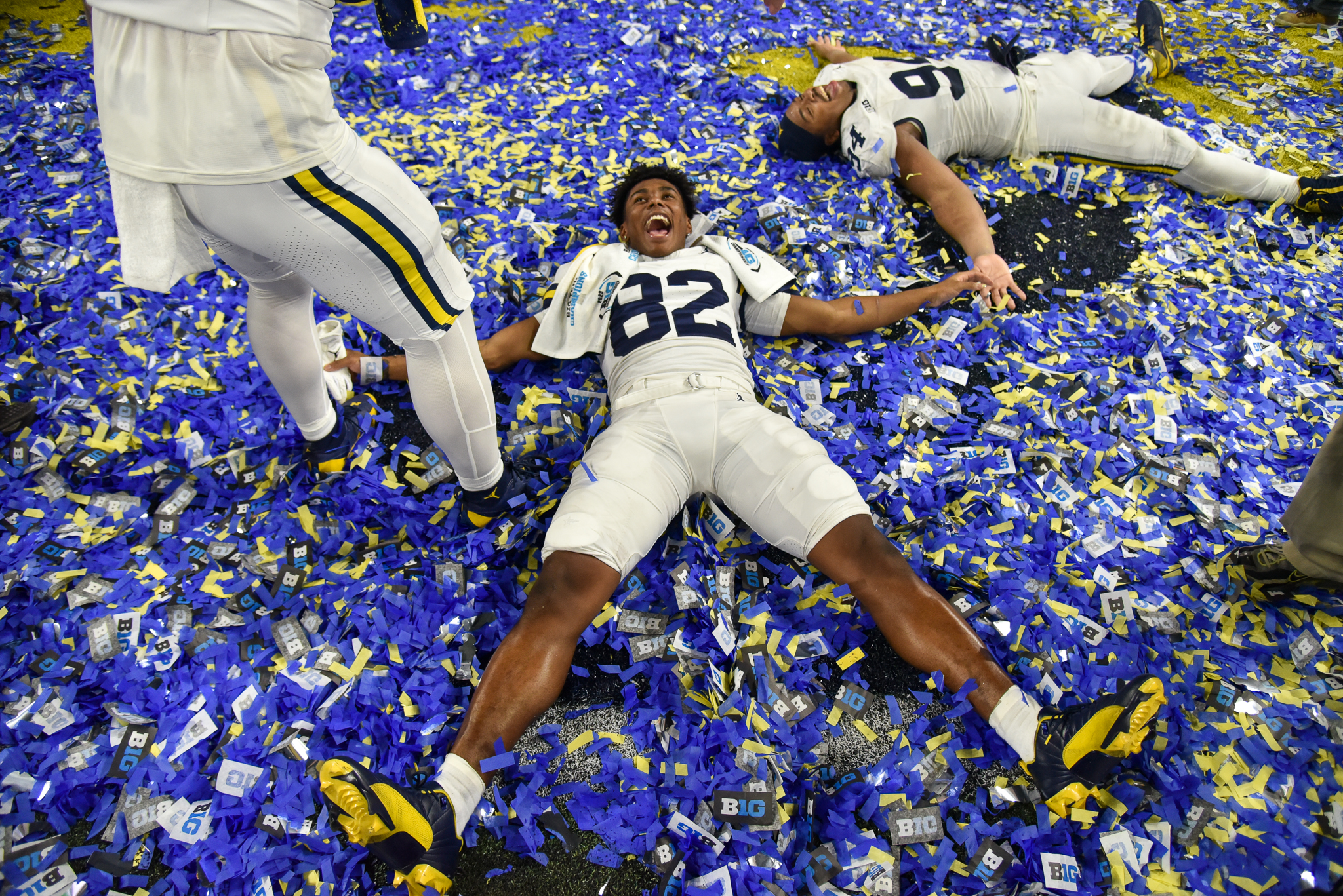
- Morgan after the 2023 Big Ten Championship with the Michigan Wolverines

No. 4 – UCLA Bruins
- Position: Wide receiver
- Class: Senior

Personal information
- Born: May 6, 2005 (age 21)
- Listed height: 5 ft 10 in (1.78 m)
- Listed weight: 179 lb (81 kg)

Career information
- High school: West Bloomfield (West Bloomfield, Michigan)
- College: Michigan (2023–2025); UCLA (2026–present)

Awards and highlights
- CFP national champion (2023)
- Stats at ESPN

Semaj J. Morgan (born May 6, 2005) is an American college football wide receiver for the UCLA Bruins. He previously played for the Michigan Wolverines, winning a national championship in 2023.

== Early life ==
Morgan was born on May 6, 2005, in West Bloomfield, Michigan, the son of Semaj and Erika Morgan. He played high school football at West Bloomfield High School, from 2019 to 2022, playing wide receiver, safety and kick returner. His first head coach at West Bloomfield was Ronald Bellamy, who would also coach Morgan as the Michigan Wolverines wide receivers coach. Morgan also played for West Bloomfield's basketball and track and field teams.

As a sophomore in 2020, Morgan was All-Region and won a state championship at West Bloomfield with high school teammate, Donovan Edwards. As a junior in 2021, he caught 61 passes for 1,015 yards and 13 touchdowns. He was named a All-State selection by the Detroit Free Press. As a senior in 2022, he tallied 744 receiving yards, 192 rushing yards and 22 total touchdowns. He was a U.S. Army Bowl All-American and named to the Detroit Free Press: Dream Team.

He was rated as a four-star prospect, and the No. 10 prospect in Michigan by Rivals. He received scholarship offers from 20 Division I football programs, including Michigan, Ole Miss, Missouri, West Virginia, Purdue and Maryland.

== College career ==
=== Michigan ===
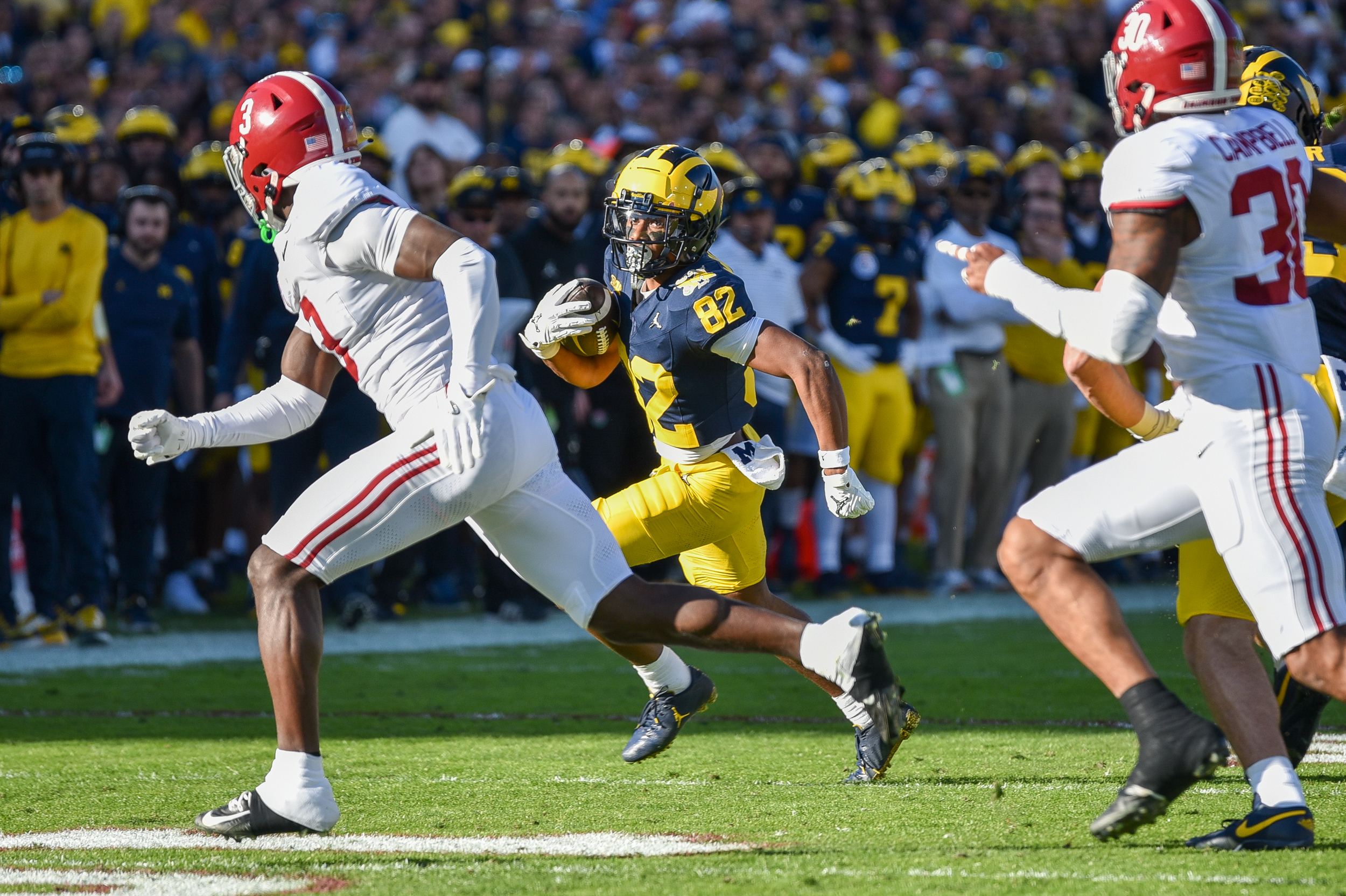
Morgan in the 2024 Rose Bowl as a freshman.

Morgan enrolled early at the University of Michigan in January 2023. In his freshman season, he appeared in all 15 games for the Wolverines as a return specialist and slot receiver, winning a national championship. Morgan recorded his first collegiate reception against UNLV on September 9, and scored his first collegiate touchdown, an 18-yard pass from J. J. McCarthy against Rutgers on September 23.

In the 2023 Big Ten Championship, Morgan returned a punt 87 yards before being tackled on the 2 yard line, leading to the first touchdown in the game, a rushing score by Blake Corum. In the 2024 Rose Bowl, Morgan muffed a punt early in the contest, resulting in a costly turnover to Alabama. He remained stead, finishing the game with a team-high four receptions and had a rushing attempt, registering 44 total yards. Morgan finished the 2023 season with 22 receptions for 204 yards, 2 receiving touchdowns, 4 rushing attempts for 67 yards, and 2 rushing touchdowns. In addition, he had 287 yards in return yardage. He was an All-Big Ten honorable mention by both the coaches and media as a freshman.

In 2024, Morgan stepped into a larger role as a leader and first-string wide receiver, following the departures of Roman Wilson and Cornelius Johnson. He changed his jersey from No. 82 to No. 0 before the start of fall camp. In week two against Texas, Morgan had a 31-yard touchdown reception, totaling five catches for 45 yards. In 2024, he played in 11 games and had 27 receptions for 139 yards and a touchdown, adding 32 rushing yards and 100 punt return yards. Morgan was an All-Big Ten honorable mention for a consecutive season as a sophomore.

=== UCLA ===
In 2026, Morgan transferred to the University of California, Los Angeles, to play for the Bruins and their new coach, Bob Chesney.
