= Andrew Sprague =

American football player (born 2005)

No. 54 – Michigan Wolverines
- Position: Offensive tackle
- Class: Junior

Personal information
- Born: September 14, 2005 (age 21)
- Listed height: 6 ft 7 in (2.01 m)
- Listed weight: 310 lb (141 kg)

Career information
- High school: Rockhurst (Kansas City, Missouri)
- College: Michigan (2024–present)
- Stats at ESPN

Andrew Sprague (born September 14, 2005) is an American college football offensive lineman for the Michigan Wolverines.

== Early life ==
Sprague attended Rockhurst High School in Kansas City, Missouri. He was rated as a four-star recruit, the 9th overall offensive tackle, and the 156th overall prospect in the class of 2024. Sprague committed to play college football for the Michigan Wolverines over offers from schools such as Notre Dame, Penn State, Oklahoma, Wisconsin, Oregon, and Nebraska.

== College career ==
Sprague made his first career start in the 2024 ReliaQuest Bowl versus Alabama. He played four games on the season to preserve his redshirt, making one start at tackle.
