= 2025 Michigan Wolverines football team =

American college football season

2025 Michigan Wolverines football

Citrus Bowl, L 27–41 vs. Texas
- Conference: Big Ten Conference

Ranking
- Coaches: No. 22
- AP: No. 21
- Record: 9–4 (7–2 Big Ten)
- Head coach: Sherrone Moore (2nd season; games 1–2, 5–12, fired Dec. 10); Biff Poggi (interim; games 3–4, bowl game)
- Offensive coordinator: Chip Lindsey (1st season)
- Co-offensive coordinator: Steve Casula (1st season)
- Offensive scheme: Pro spread
- Defensive coordinator: Don Martindale (2nd season)
- Base defense: 4–2–5
- MVP: Derrick Moore
- Captains: Max Bredeson; Rod Moore; Giovanni El-Hadi; Ernest Hausmann; Marlin Klein; Derrick Moore
- Home stadium: Michigan Stadium

Uniform
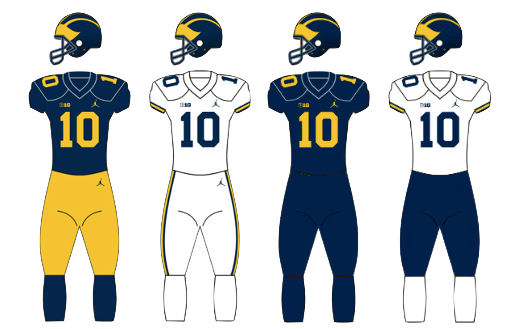

2025 Big Ten Conference football standings
	Conf.			Overall
Team	W		L	W		L
No. 1 Indiana y$#^	9	–	0	16	–	0
No. 5 Ohio State y^	9	–	0	12	–	2
No. 4 Oregon ^	8	–	1	13	–	2
No. 21 Michigan	7	–	2	9	–	4
No. 20 USC	7	–	2	9	–	4
No. 17 Iowa	6	–	3	9	–	4
Illinois	5	–	4	9	–	4
Washington	5	–	4	9	–	4
Minnesota	5	–	4	8	–	5
Nebraska	4	–	5	7	–	6
Northwestern	4	–	5	7	–	6
Penn State	3	–	6	7	–	6
UCLA	3	–	6	3	–	9
Rutgers	2	–	7	5	–	7
Wisconsin	2	–	7	4	–	8
Maryland	1	–	8	4	–	8
Michigan State	1	–	8	4	–	8
Purdue	0	–	9	2	–	10
Championship: Indiana 13, Ohio State 10
# – College Football Playoff champion; ^ – College Football Playoff participant; $ – Conference champion; y – Championship game participant; As of November 14, 2026; Rankings from AP Poll

The 2025 Michigan Wolverines football team was an American football team that represented the University of Michigan as a member of the Big Ten Conference during the 2025 NCAA Division I FBS football season. In their second and final year under head coach Sherrone Moore, the Wolverines compiled a 9–4 record and outscored opponents by a total of 331 to 224. Against ranked opponents, they lost to No. 18 Oklahoma in week 2 and No. 1 Ohio State in the final game of the regular season. It was Michigan's first loss to Ohio State since 2019 and drew 18.4 million viewers, the most of any regular-season game in 2025.

On December 10, the university announced that Sherrone Moore had been fired for cause, disclosing that he had an "inappropriate relationship with a staff member." Associate head coach Biff Poggi was named the interim head coach for the Citrus Bowl against Texas, which Michigan lost, 41–27.

The team's statistical leaders in 2025 included quarterback Bryce Underwood (2,428 passing yards and 17 total touchdowns), running back Jordan Marshall (932 rushing yards and 10 rushing touchdowns), wide receiver Andrew Marsh (45 receptions for 651 yards), linebacker Jimmy Rolder (73 total tackles, 47 solo tackles), and defensive end Derrick Moore (10 sacks).

The team played its home games at Michigan Stadium in Ann Arbor, Michigan, drawing an average home attendance of 110,842–the highest in college football.

== Schedule ==
Date	Time	Opponent	Rank	Site	TV	Result	Attendance	Source
August 30	7:30 p.m.	New Mexico*	No. 14	Michigan Stadium; Ann Arbor, MI	NBC	W 34–17	110,648	
September 6	7:30 p.m.	at No. 18 Oklahoma*	No. 15	Gaylord Family Oklahoma Memorial Stadium; Norman, OK (College GameDay)	ABC	L 13–24	84,107	
September 13	12:00 p.m.	Central Michigan*	No. 23	Michigan Stadium; Ann Arbor, MI	BTN	W 63–3	110,740	
September 20	3:30 p.m.	at Nebraska	No. 21	Memorial Stadium; Lincoln, NE	CBS	W 30–27	87,278	
October 4	12:00 p.m.	Wisconsin^{†}	No. 20	Michigan Stadium; Ann Arbor, MI (Big Noon Kickoff)	Fox	W 24–10	111,070	
October 11	7:30 p.m.	at USC	No. 15	Los Angeles Memorial Coliseum; Los Angeles, CA	NBC	L 13–31	75,500	
October 18	12:00 p.m.	Washington		Michigan Stadium; Ann Arbor, MI	Fox	W 24–7	110,701	
October 25	7:30 p.m.	at Michigan State	No. 25	Spartan Stadium; East Lansing, MI (rivalry)	NBC	W 31–20	75,085	
November 1	7:00 p.m.	Purdue	No. 21	Michigan Stadium; Ann Arbor, MI	BTN	W 21–16	110,517	
November 15	12:00 p.m.	at Northwestern	No. 18	Wrigley Field; Chicago, IL (George Jewett Trophy, Big Noon Kickoff)	Fox	W 24–22	38,223	
November 22	4:00 p.m.	at Maryland	No. 18	SECU Stadium; College Park, MD	BTN	W 45–20	46,185	
November 29	12:00 p.m.	No. 1 Ohio State	No. 15	Michigan Stadium; Ann Arbor, MI (rivalry, Big Noon Kickoff, College GameDay)	Fox	L 9–27	111,373	
December 31	3:00 p.m.	vs. No. 13 Texas*	No. 18	Camping World Stadium; Orlando, FL (Citrus Bowl)	ABC	L 27–41	47,316	
*Non-conference game; ^{†}Homecoming; Rankings from AP Poll (and CFP Rankings, after November 4) - Released prior to game; All times are in Eastern time; Source:

== Rankings ==
Ranking movements Legend: ██ Increase in ranking ██ Decrease in ranking RV = Received votes
	Week																
Poll	Pre	1	2	3	4	5	6	7	8	9	10	11	12	13	14	15	Final
AP	14	15	23	21	19	20	15	RV	25	21	21	18	18	15	18	18	21
Coaches	14	13	22	20	18	20	15	RV	24	21	20	17	17	15	18	17	22
CFP	Not released										21	18	18	15	19	18	Not released

== Game summaries ==
=== vs New Mexico ===
New Mexico Lobos (0–0) at No. 14 Michigan Wolverines (0–0) – Game summary

Quarter	1	2	3	4	Total
Lobos	0	10	7	0	17
No. 14 Wolverines	14	10	3	7	34

at Michigan Stadium • Ann Arbor, Michigan

- Date: August 30
- Game time: 7:30 p.m.
- Game weather: 70 °F (21 °C), clear, NE 2 miles per hour (3.2 km/h)
- Game attendance: 110,648
- Referee: Chris Coyte
- TV announcers (NBC): Noah Eagle (play-by-play), Todd Blackledge (color commentator), and Kathryn Tappen (sideline reporter)

Game information

First quarter

- (12:57) MICH – Justice Haynes 56-yard run, Dominic Zvada kick (Drive: 6 plays, 78 yards, 1:57; Michigan 7–0)
- (4:26) MICH – Justice Haynes 5-yard run, Dominic Zvada kick (Drive: 13 plays, 73 yards, 6:46; Michigan 14–0)

Second quarter

- (8:21) MICH – Dominic Zvada 21-yard field goal (Drive: 5 plays, 14 yards, 1:54; Michigan 17–0)
- (2:23) UNM – Dorian Thomas 9-yard pass from DJ McKinney, Luke Drzewiecki kick (Drive: 12 plays, 82 yards, 5:55; Michigan 17–7)
- (1:56) UNM – Luke Drzewiecki 44-yard field goal (Drive: 4 plays, 2 yards, 0:22; Michigan 17–10)
- (0:25) MICH – Marlin Klein 15-yard pass from Bryce Underwood, Dominic Zvada kick (Drive: 8 plays, 75 yards, 1:31; Michigan 24–10)

Third quarter

- (10:19) MICH – Dominic Zvada 39-yard field goal (Drive: 9 plays, 73 yards, 2:47; Michigan 27–10)
- (1:40) UNM – Dorian Thomas 3-yard pass from Jack Layne, Luke Drzewiecki kick (Drive: 15 plays, 75 yards, 8:39; Michigan 27–17)

Fourth quarter

- (10:14) MICH – Justice Haynes 1-yard run, Dominic Zvada kick (Drive: 6 plays, 80 yards, 3:16; Michigan 34–17)

On August 30, Michigan opened its season with a 34–17 victory over New Mexico before a crowd of 110,648 at Michigan Stadium. Michigan scored 14 points in the first quarter on two rushing touchdowns by Justice Haynes, from 56 yards, and five yards, respectively. Michigan extended its lead in the second quarter on a 21-yard field goal by Dominic Zvada. New Mexico scored ten points in the quarter on a nine-yard touchdown pass from DJ McKinney to Dorian Thomas and a 44-yard field goal by Luke Drzewiecki. Michigan scored the final points of the half on a 15-yard touchdown pass from Bryce Underwood to Marlin Klein. Michigan led, 24–10, at halftime. Michigan opened the scoring in the third quarter on a 39-yard field goal by Zvada. New Mexico responded with a three-yard touchdown pass from Jack Layne to Thomas. Michigan scored the only points of the fourth quarter on a one-yard touchdown run by Haynes.

This was the first ever meeting between the two programs. Freshman quarterback Bryce Underwood made the first start of his career. Underwood became the first freshman quarterback to start a season opener for Michigan since Tate Forcier in 2009. Underwood completed 21 of 31 passes, and set a Michigan record for a freshman quarterback in their debut with 251 yards, surpassing the previous record of 179 yards set by Forcier in 2009. Running back Justice Haynes recorded 16 carries for 159 yards and three touchdowns. Haynes' 159 yards set a new program high (since 1970) for running backs making their Michigan debut.

Statistics	UNM	MICH
First downs	21	20
Plays–yards	76–267	63–452
Rushes–yards	28–50	32–201
Passing yards	217	251
Passing: comp–att–int	32–48–3	21–31–0
Turnovers	3	1
Time of possession	33:02	26:58

Team	Category	Player	Statistics
New Mexico	Passing	Jack Layne	31/47, 208 yards, TD, 3 INT
New Mexico	Rushing	Scottre Humphrey	10 carries, 33 yards
New Mexico	Receiving	Dorian Thomas	10 receptions, 71 yards, 2 TD
Michigan	Passing	Bryce Underwood	21/31, 251 yards, TD
Michigan	Rushing	Justice Haynes	16 carries, 159 yards, 3 TD
Michigan	Receiving	Marlin Klein	6 receptions, 93 yards, TD

=== at No. 18 Oklahoma ===
No. 15 Michigan Wolverines (1–0) at No. 18 Oklahoma Sooners (1–0) – Game summary

Quarter	1	2	3	4	Total
No. 15 Wolverines	0	0	13	0	13
No. 18 Sooners	7	7	7	3	24

at Gaylord Family Oklahoma Memorial Stadium • Norman, Oklahoma

- Date: September 6
- Game time: 7:30 p.m.
- Game weather: 76 °F (24 °C), sunny, NE 6 miles per hour (9.7 km/h)
- Game attendance: 84,107
- Referee: Mark Kluczynski
- TV announcers (ABC): Chris Fowler (play-by-play), Kirk Herbstreit (color commentator), and Holly Rowe (sideline)

Game information

First quarter

- (10:00) OU – Deion Burks 9-yard pass from John Mateer, Tate Sandell kick (Drive: 12 plays, 75 yards, 5:00; OKLA 7–0)

Second quarter

- (0:22) OU – John Mateer 2-yard run, Tate Sandell kick (Drive: 10 plays, 80 yards, 2:55; OKLA 14–0)

Third quarter

- (14:49) MICH – Justice Haynes 75-yard run, Dominic Zvada kick (Drive: 1 play, 75 yards, 0:11; OKLA 14–7)
- (10:12) OU – John Mateer 10-yard run, Tate Sandell kick (Drive: 5 plays, 51 yards, 1:55; 'OKLA 21–7)
- (6:33) MICH – Dominic Zvada 42-yard field goal (Drive: 4 plays, 8 yards, 1:30; OKLA 21–10)
- (1:24) MICH – Dominic Zvada 35-yard field goal (Drive: 8 plays, 60 yards, 3:20; OKLA 21–13)

Fourth quarter

- (1:44) OU – Tate Sandell 21-yard field goal (Drive: 16 plays, 78 yards, 8:27; OKLA 24–13)

On September 6, Michigan, ranked No. 15, lost to No. 18 Oklahoma, 24–13, before a crowd of 84,107 at Memorial Stadium in Norman, Oklahoma. On the opening possession of the game, Oklahoma drove 75 yards, including passes by John Mateer to Jaren Kanak for 31 yards, to Deion Burks for 21 yards, and for nine yards and a touchdown to Burks. At the end of the first quarter, Michigan's TJ Metcalf intercepted a Mateer pass, but Michigan was held to a three-and-out after the turnover. Halfway through the second quarter, Michigan drove 72 yards to the Oklahoma 14-yard line, from which point Dominic Zvada missed a 32-yard field goal attempt. After the missed field goal, Oklahoma drove 80 yards, scoring on a two-yard touchdown run by Mateer. Oklahoma led, 14–0, at halftime.

On the first play from scrimmage after halftime, Justice Haynes broke loose for a 75-yard touchdown run—Michigan's longest offensive play since Donovan Edwards' 85-yard rushing touchdown against Ohio State in 2022. After an exchange of punts, Oklahoma drove 51 yards on five plays, scoring on a ten-yard touchdown run by Mateer, extending their lead to 21–7. Midway in the third quarter, Oklahoma's Isaiah Sategna III fumbled a punt, and Cole Sullivan recovered the loose ball for Michigan at the Oklahoma 31-yard line. Michigan advanced the ball to the 24-yard line, settling for a 42-yard field goal by Zvada. Late in the third quarter, Michigan drove 60 yards, fueled by a 44-yard pass from Bryce Underwood to Donaven McCulley, but Michigan again settled for a 35-yard Zvada field goal, reducing Oklahoma's lead to 21–13. At the beginning of the fourth quarter, Oklahoma drove 51 yards to the Michigan 24-yard line, but Tate Sandell's field goal attempt failed. After a Michigan punt, Oklahoma sealed its victory with 78-yard drive that consumed eight-and-a-half minutes, ending with a 21-yard Sandell field goal with 1:44 remaining in the game.

In his first road game, Underwood completed nine of 24 passes (37.5%) for 142 yards. Excluding Haynes' 75-yard touchdown run, Michigan tallied only 71 rushing yards on 31 carries for an average of 2.3 yards per carry. McCulley led Michigan's receivers with three catches for 91 yards. For Oklahoma, Mateer completed 21 of 34 passes for 270 yards; Mateer also led the Sooners in rushing with 19 carries for 74 yards. Burks had seven receptions for 101 yards for the Sooners. Burks grew up in Inkster, Michigan, dreaming of playing for Michigan, but was never recruited by the Wolverines.

Statistics	MICH	OU
First downs	12	22
Plays–yards	56–288	74–408
Rushes–yards	32–146	40–138
Passing yards	142	270
Passing: Comp–Att–Int	9–24–0	21–34–1
Turnovers	0	2
Time of possession	27:48	32:12

Team	Category	Player	Statistics
Michigan	Passing	Bryce Underwood	9/24, 142 yards
Michigan	Rushing	Justice Haynes	19 carries, 125 yards, TD
Michigan	Receiving	Donaven McCulley	3 receptions, 91 yards
Oklahoma	Passing	John Mateer	21/34, 270 yards, TD, INT
Oklahoma	Rushing	John Mateer	19 carries, 74 yards, 2 TD
Oklahoma	Receiving	Deion Burks	7 receptions, 101 yards, TD

=== vs Central Michigan ===
Central Michigan Chippewas (1–1) at No. 23 Michigan Wolverines (1–1) – Game summary

Quarter	1	2	3	4	Total
Chippewas	0	3	0	0	3
No. 23 Wolverines	14	21	14	14	63

at Michigan Stadium • Ann Arbor, Michigan

- Date: September 13
- Game time: 12:00 p.m.
- Game weather: 69 °F (21 °C), cloudy, SW 5 miles per hour (8.0 km/h)
- Game attendance: 110,740
- Referee: Matthew Richards
- TV announcers (BTN): Jeff Levering (play-by-play), Jake Butt (color commentator), and Brooke Fletcher (sideline reporter)

Game information

First quarter

- (10:56) MICH – Justice Haynes 2-yard run, Dominic Zvada kick (Drive: 10 plays, 75 yards, 4:04; Michigan 7–0)
- (7:21) MICH – Semaj Morgan 32-yard pass from Bryce Underwood, Dominic Zvada kick (Drive: 6 plays, 59 yards, 2:28; Michigan 14–0)

Second quarter

- (12:09) MICH – Bryce Underwood 20-yard run, Dominic Zvada kick (Drive: 4 plays, 77 yards, 2:04; Michigan 21–0)
- (9:23) MICH – Andrew Marsh 23-yard run, Dominic Zvada kick (Drive: 2 plays, 34 yards, 0:48; Michigan 28–0)
- (1:51) CMU – Cade Graham 22-yard field goal (Drive: 14 plays, 81 yards, 5:52; Michigan 28–3)
- (0:09) MICH – Jordan Marshall 1-yard run, Dominic Zvada kick (Drive: 11 plays, 79 yards, 1:36; Michigan 35–3)

Third quarter

- (8:27) MICH – Jordan Marshall 4-yard run, Dominic Zvada kick (Drive: 10 plays, 70 yards, 4:29; Michigan 42–3)
- (3:12) MICH – Bryce Underwood 18-yard run, Dominic Zvada kick (Drive: 8 plays, 63 yards, 4:17; Michigan 49–3)

Fourth quarter

- (14:01) MICH – Bryson Kuzdzal 1-yard run, Dominic Zvada kick (Drive: 7 plays, 48 yards, 3:25; Michigan 56–3)
- (9:00) MICH – Jasper Parker 1-yard run, Dominic Zvada kick (Drive: 9 plays, 45 yards, 4:50; Michigan 63–3)

On September 13, the Wolverines defeated Central Michigan 63–3, before a crowd of 110,740 at Michigan Stadium. Michigan scored 14 points in the first quarter via a two-yard touchdown run by Justice Haynes and a 32-yard touchdown pass from Bryce Underwood to Semaj Morgan. Michigan scored 21 points in the second quarter via a 20-yard touchdown run by Underwood, a 23-yard touchdown run by Andrew Marsh and a one-yard touchdown run by Jordan Marshall. Central Michigan finally got on the board via a 22-yard field goal by Cade Graham. Michigan led 35–3, at halftime. Michigan added 14 points in the third quarter via a four-yard touchdown run by Marshall and an 18-yard touchdown run by Underwood. Michigan extended their lead in the fourth quarter via a one-yard touchdown run by Bryson Kuzdzal and a one-yard touchdown run by Jasper Parker. None of Central Michigan's first five drives netted more than ten yards or lasted more than six plays. The Wolverines' defense held the Chippewas to 80 total first-half yards, their fewest allowed since limiting UNLV to 60 yards in 2023. Associate head coach Biff Poggi served as interim head coach during the game, as head coach Sherrone Moore was serving the first of a two-game self-imposed suspension for the University of Michigan football sign-stealing scandal.

Quarterback Bryce Underwood completed 16 of 25 passes for 235 yards, and rushed for 114 yards on nine carries, accounting for 339 yards of total offense and three touchdowns. His 114 rushing yards were the most by a Michigan quarterback since Devin Gardner ran for 121 yards against Penn State in 2013. Michigan recorded 616 total yards of offense, their most in a game since recording 660 total yards against Maryland in 2016. Their 63 points was their highest total since scoring the same number against Northern Illinois in 2021.

Statistics	CMU	MICH
First downs	8	35
Plays–yards	53–139	80–616
Rushes–yards	33–79	55–381
Passing yards	60	235
Passing: comp–att–int	11–20–1	16–25–1
Turnovers	2	1
Time of possession	26:53	33:07

Team	Category	Player	Statistics
Central Michigan	Passing	Joe Labas	4/8, 36 yards, INT
Central Michigan	Rushing	Angel H. Flores	9 carries, 76 yards
Central Michigan	Receiving	Justin Ruffin Jr.	2 receptions, 23 yards
Michigan	Passing	Bryce Underwood	16/25, 235 yards, TD, INT
Michigan	Rushing	Bryce Underwood	9 carries, 117 yards, 2 TD
Michigan	Receiving	Semaj Morgan	4 receptions, 69 yards, TD

=== at Nebraska ===
No. 21 Michigan Wolverines (2–1) at Nebraska Cornhuskers (3–0) – Game summary

Quarter	1	2	3	4	Total
No. 21 Wolverines	10	7	10	3	30
Cornhuskers	0	17	0	10	27

at Memorial Stadium • Lincoln, Nebraska

- Date: September 20
- Game time: 3:30 p.m.
- Game weather: 73 °F (23 °C), sunny, NE 1 mile per hour (1.6 km/h)
- Game attendance: 87,278
- Referee: Kole Knueppel
- TV announcers (CBS): Brad Nessler (play-by-play), Gary Danielson (color commentator), and Jenny Dell (sideline reporter)

Game information

First quarter

- (1:38) MICH – Dominic Zvada 46-yard field goal (Drive: 10 plays, 46 yards, 3:22; Michigan 3–0)
- (0:11) MICH – Bryce Underwood 37-yard run, Dominic Zvada kick (Drive: 1 play, 37 yards, 0:06; Michigan 10–0)

Second quarter

- (8:58) NEB – Kyle Cunanan 22-yard field goal (Drive: 7 plays, 31 yards, 4:10; Michigan 10–3)
- (2:01) NEB – Jacory Barney Jr. 26-yard pass from Dylan Raiola, Kyle Cunanan kick (Drive: 7 plays, 63 yards, 3:57; Tied 10–10)
- (1:51) MICH – Justice Haynes 75-yard run, Dominic Zvada kick (Drive: 1 plays, 75 yards, 0:10; Michigan 17–10)
- (0:00) NEB – Jacory Barney Jr. 52-yard pass from Dylan Raiola, Kyle Cunanan kick (Drive: 7 plays, 75 yards, 1:51; Tied 17–17)

Third quarter

- (7:43) MICH – Dominic Zvada 56-yard field goal (Drive: 8 plays, 22 yards, 2:32; Michigan 20–17)
- (5:40) MICH – Jordan Marshall 54-yard run, Dominic Zvada kick (Drive: 2 plays, 62 yards, 0:32; Michigan 27–17)

Fourth quarter

- (14:56) NEB – Kyle Cunanan 38-yard field goal (Drive: 12 plays, 55 yards, 5:44; Michigan 27–20)
- (3:54) MICH – Dominic Zvada 21-yard field goal (Drive: 16 plays, 77 yards, 8:46; Michigan 30–20)
- (1:34) NEB – Heinrich Haarberg 3-yard pass from Dylan Raiola, Kyle Cunanan kick (Drive: 10 plays, 75 yards, 2:20; Michigan 30–27)

On September 20, Michigan defeated Nebraska, 30–27, before a crowd of 87,278 at Memorial Stadium in Lincoln, Nebraska. Biff Poggi served as interim head coach for the second consecutive game during the suspension of Sherrone Moore.

After the opening kickoff, Nebraska drove 70 yards to Michigan's five-yard line, but Michigan's defense held on fourth-and-two. After a three-and-out by the Michigan offense, Michigan's Hudson Hollenbeck punted for 24 yards, giving Nebraska possession at Michigan's 37-yard line; Kyle Cunanan missed a 44-yard field goal attempt for the Cornhuskers. On Michigan's second possession, the Wolverines drove 46 yards, ending in a 46-yard field goal by Dominic Zvada. With 1:23 remaining in the first quarter, Jyaire Hill tipped a Dylan Raiola pass which was intercepted by Cole Sullivan at Nebraska's 37-yard line. On the next play, Bryce Underwood ran 37 yards for a touchdown, and Michigan led, 10–0, at the end of the first quarter.

Early in the second quarter, Underwood was stripped of the ball after an eight-yard run, and Nebraska's DeShon Singleton recovered the loose ball at the Nebraska 48-yard line. The Cornhuskers drove to the Michigan 21-yard line, and Cunanan kicked a 39-yard field goal. After a Michigan three-and-out, Nebraska drove 63 yards, ending with a 26-yard touchdown pass from Raiola to Jacory Barney Jr. to tie the game. On the next play from scrimmage, Justice Haynes ran 75 yards for a touchdown with 1:51 remaining in the half. In the final two minutes, Nebraska drove to midfield, and Railoa completed a 52-yard Hail Mary pass to Jacory Jr., tying the game as time expired in the half.

On its second possession of the third quarter, Michigan drove 22 yards to Nebraska's 38-yard line, and Zvada kicked a career-long 56-yard field goal. After holding Nebraska to a three-and-out, Jordan Marshall led a two-play, 62-yard drive, with runs of eight and 54 yards, the latter for a touchdown.

Late in the third quarter, Michigan's defense held on a third-and 14 play, but an unsportsmanlike conduct penalty against Brandyn Hillman for taunting the Nebraska bench gave the Cornhuskers a first down. Nebraska then drove to the Michigan 20-yard line, and Cunanan kicked a 38-yard field on the first play of the fourth quarter. After an exchange of punts, the Wolverines drained the clock with a 16-play, 8:46 drive culminating with a 21-yard field goal by Zvada. Nebraska regained possession with 3:54 remaining and trailing by 10 points. Raiola led a 75-yard touchdown drive, ending with a short touchdown pass to Heinrich Haarberg. Nebraska attempted an onside kick, recovered for Michigan by Kendrick Bell.

Michigan tallied 290 rushing yards in the game: Haynes - 149 yards on 17 carries (8.8-yard average); Marshall - 80 yards on six carries (13.3 yards per carry); and Underwood 61 yards on eight carries (7.6 yards per carry). Haynes became the first Michigan player to rush for over 100 yards in each of his first four games for the program. Underwood also completed 12 of 22 passes for 105 yards. On defense, Michigan gave up 308 passing yards by Raiola, but registered seven sacks and held the Cornhuskers to only 31 rushing yards (1.4 yards per carry).

Statistics	MICH	NEB
First downs	16	23
Plays–yards	56–391	72–351
Rushes–yards	33–286	31–43
Passing yards	108	305
Passing: comp–att–int	12–23–0	30–41–1
Turnovers	1	1
Time of possession	33:17	26:43

Team	Category	Player	Statistics
Michigan	Passing	Bryce Underwood	12/22, 105 yards
Michigan	Rushing	Justice Haynes	17 carries, 143 yards, TD
Michigan	Receiving	Donaven McCulley	3 receptions, 39 yards
Nebraska	Passing	Dylan Raiola	30/41, 308 yards, 3 TD, INT
Nebraska	Rushing	Emmett Johnson	19 carries, 67 yards
Nebraska	Receiving	Jacory Barney Jr.	6 receptions, 120 yards, 2 TD

=== vs Wisconsin ===
Wisconsin Badgers (2–2) at No. 20 Michigan Wolverines (3–1) – Game summary

Quarter	1	2	3	4	Total
Badgers	7	0	0	3	10
No. 20 Wolverines	7	3	7	7	24

at Michigan Stadium • Ann Arbor, Michigan

- Date: October 4
- Game time: 12:00 p.m.
- Game weather: 84 °F (29 °C), sunny, SW 7 miles per hour (11 km/h)
- Game attendance: 111,070
- Referee: Ron Snodgrass
- TV announcers (FOX): Gus Johnson (play-by-play), Joel Klatt (color commentator), and Jenny Taft (sideline reporter)

Game information

First quarter

- (8:10) WIS – Dilin Jones 5-yard run, Nathanial Vakos kick (Drive: 12 plays, 75 yards, 6:50; Wisconsin 7–0)
- (6:02) MICH – Justice Haynes 1-yard run, Dominic Zvada kick (Drive: 5 plays, 75 yards, 2:08; Tied 7–7)

Second quarter

- (5:43) MICH – Dominic Zvada 40-yard field goal (Drive: 8 plays, 44 yards, 3:27; Michigan 10–7)

Third quarter

- (4:11) MICH – Donaven McCulley 29-yard pass from Bryce Underwood, Dominic Zvada kick (Drive: 3 plays, 67 yards, 1:03; Michigan 17–7)

Fourth quarter

- (9:24) MICH – Justice Haynes 1-yard run, Dominic Zvada kick (Drive: 6 plays, 61 yards, 2:47; Michigan 24–7)
- (2:43) WIS – Nathanial Vakos 39-yard field goal (Drive: 13 plays, 53 yards, 6:41; Michigan 24–10)

On October 4, Michigan defeated Wisconsin, 24–10, before a crowd of 111,070 at Michigan Stadium. After the opening kickoff, Wisconsin drove 75 yards on 12 plays, including a 17-yard pass from Hunter Simmons to Vinny Anthony II and a five-yard touchdown run up the middle by Dilin Jones. On the next drive, Michigan also drove 75 yards, featuring a 43-yard run by Justice Haynes and a one-yard touchdown run by Haynes to tie the game. After opening the game with two scoring drives, the teams traded punts on the next five possessions. Late in the second quarter, Michigan drove 44 yards, including a 32-yard pass from Bryce Underwood to Andrew Marsh and ending with a 40-yard field goal by Dominic Zvada. Michigan led, 10–7, at halftime.

On the opening drive of the second half, Michigan drove 66 yards, including a 26-yard pass from Underwood to Marsh, but Zvada missed a 27-yard field goal at the end of the drive. Later in the third quarter, the Wolverines drove 67 yards, including pass completions of 33 and 29 yards from Underwood to Donaven McCulley, the latter good for a touchdown. On the drive following the touchdown, Rod Moore intercepted a Hunter Simmons pass at Michigan's 17-yard line. The Wolverines then drove 52 yards to the Wisconsin 28-yard line where the Badgers' defense stopped the Wolverines on fourth down. On its next possession, Michigan drove 61 yards, including a 25-yard pass from Underwood to McCulley and concluding with a one-yard touchdown run by Haynes with 9:24 remaining in the game. The Badgers responded with a 53-yard, 13-play drive that consumed 6:41, but they were forced to settle for a 39-yard field goal by Nathanial Vakos.

On offense, Underwood completed 19 of 28 passes for a season-high 270 yards, and McCulley had six receptions for 112 yards – the first 100-yard game by a Michigan receiver since the 2023 season. Wisconsin came into the game ranked first nationally in run defense, having allowed only 50 rushing yards per game. The Wolverines tallied 175 rushing yards, led by Haynes with 117 yards and two touchdowns on 19 carries. Haynes became the first Michigan player to tally over 100 yards in his first five games with the team.

On defense, Michigan held Wisconsin to 75 rushing yards, including just seven yards in the second half. In the nine drives following Wisconsin's touchdown, the Wolverines held the Badgers to eight punts and an interception. Hunter Simmons tallied 177 passing yards, and Vinny Anthony II had nine receptions for 97 yards.

Statistics	WIS	MICH
First downs	13	19
Plays–yards	57–252	62–445
Rushes–yards	28–75	34–175
Passing yards	177	270
Passing: comp–att–int	18–29–1	19–28–0
Turnovers	1	0
Time of possession	30:57	29:03

Team	Category	Player	Statistics
Wisconsin	Passing	Hunter Simmons	18/29, 177 yards, INT
Wisconsin	Rushing	Dilin Jones	17 carries, 63 yards, TD
Wisconsin	Receiving	Vinny Anthony II	9 receptions, 97 yards
Michigan	Passing	Bryce Underwood	19/28, 270 yards, TD
Michigan	Rushing	Justice Haynes	19 carries, 117 yards, 2 TD
Michigan	Receiving	Donaven McCulley	6 receptions, 112 yards, TD

=== at USC ===
No.15 Michigan Wolverines (4–1) at USC Trojans (4–1) – Game summary

Quarter	1	2	3	4	Total
No.15 Wolverines	0	7	0	6	13
Trojans	7	7	7	10	31

at Los Angeles Memorial Coliseum • Los Angeles, California

- Date: October 11
- Game time: 7:30 p.m.
- Game weather: 77 °F (25 °C), sunny, W 7 miles per hour (11 km/h)
- Game attendance: 75,500
- Referee: Francisco Villar
- TV announcers (NBC): Noah Eagle (play-by-play), Todd Blackledge (color commentator), and Kathryn Tappen (sideline reporter)

Game information

First quarter

- (8:57) USC – Ja'Kobi Lane 2-yard pass from Jayden Maiava (Ryon Sayeri kick) (Drive: 11 plays, 75 yards, 5:58; USC 7–0)

Second quarter

- (3:09) MICH – Donaven McCulley 8-yard pass from Bryce Underwood (Dominic Zvada kick) (Drive: 14 plays, 86 yards, 6:03; Tied 7–7)
- (0:14) USC – Makai Lemon 12-yard pass from Jayden Maiava (Ryon Sayeri kick) (Drive: 9 plays, 75 yards, 2:50; USC 14–7)

Third quarter

- (10:45) USC – King Miller 15-yard run (Ryon Sayeri kick) (Drive: 5 plays, 52 yards, 1:49; USC 21–7)

Fourth quarter

- (10:01) USC – Ryon Sayeri 54-yard field goal (Drive: 10 plays, 41 yards, 5:36; USC 24–7)
- (9:17) MICH – Andrew Marsh 69-yard pass from Bryce Underwood (pass failed) (Drive: 2 plays, 75 yards, 0:44; USC 24–13)
- (4:21) USC – Bryan Jackson 29-yard run (Ryon Sayeri kick) (Drive: 9 plays, 75 yards, 4:56; USC 31–13)

On October 11, Michigan lost to USC, 31–13, before a crowd of 75,500 at Los Angeles Memorial Coliseum in Los Angeles, California, in Michigan's first visit to the Coliseum since 1957. This marked the Wolverine's first Big Ten Conference loss of the season. USC opened the scoring in the first quarter via a two-yard touchdown pass from Jayden Maiava to Ja'Kobi Lane. Michigan finally got on the board in the second quarter via an eight-yard touchdown pass from Bryce Underwood to Donaven McCulley to tie the game. USC responded with a 12-yard touchdown pass from Maiava to Makai Lemon with 14 seconds remaining in the half. USC led, 14–7, at halftime. USC extended their lead in the third quarter via a 15-yard touchdown run by King Miller. USC intercepted Underwood in the final minute of the third quarter to close a 10-play, 67-yard drive. The Trojans took advantage of the turnover and extending their lead with a 54-yard field goal by Ryon Sayeri. Michigan responded with a 69-yard touchdown pass from Underwood to Andrew Marsh, and a failed two-point conversion. USC scored the final points of the game via a 29-yard touchdown run by Bryan Jackson.

Wide receiver Andrew Marsh's 69-yard touchdown reception in the fourth quarter was Michigan's longest pass play this season and the team's longest since a 75-yard touchdown from J. J. McCarthy to Cornelius Johnson against Ohio State in 2022.

Statistics	MICH	USC
First downs	17	24
Plays–yards	57–316	68–489
Rushes–yards	31–109	36–224
Passing yards	207	265
Passing: comp–att–int	15–26–2	25–32–1
Turnovers	2	2
Time of possession	26:38	33:22

Team	Category	Player	Statistics
Michigan	Passing	Bryce Underwood	15/24, 207 yards, TD, 2 INT
Michigan	Rushing	Jordan Marshall	14 carries, 68 yards
Michigan	Receiving	Andrew Marsh	8 receptions, 138 yards, TD
USC	Passing	Jayden Maiava	25/32, 207 yards, 2 TD, INT
USC	Rushing	King Miller	18 carries, 158 yards, TD
USC	Receiving	Makai Lemon	9 receptions, 93 yards, TD

=== vs Washington ===
Washington Huskies (5–1) at Michigan Wolverines (4–2) – Game summary

Quarter	1	2	3	4	Total
Huskies	0	7	0	0	7
Wolverines	7	0	7	10	24

at Michigan Stadium • Ann Arbor, Michigan

- Date: October 18
- Game time: 12:00 p.m.
- Game weather: 71 °F (22 °C), sunny, SW 10 miles per hour (16 km/h)
- Game attendance: 110,701
- Referee: Jason Nickleby
- TV announcers (FOX): Gus Johnson (play-by-play), Joel Klatt (color commentator), and Jenny Taft (sideline reporter)

Game information

First quarter

- (0:33) MICH – Andrew Marsh 22-yard pass from Bryce Underwood (Dominic Zvada kick) (Drive: 7 plays, 80 yards, 3:47; Michigan 7–0)

Second quarter

- (0:40) WASH – Jonah Coleman 1-yard run (Grady Gross kick) (Drive: 13 plays, 70 yards, 4:31; Tied 7–7)

Third quarter

- (1:20) MICH – Jordan Marshall 14-yard run (Dominic Zvada kick) (Drive: 1 play, 14 yards, 0:06; MICH 14–7)

Fourth quarter

- (10:05) MICH – Zack Marshall 10-yard pass from Bryce Underwood (Dominic Zvada kick) (Drive: 9 plays, 62 yards, 5:25; Michigan 21–7)
- (4:10) MICH – Dominic Zvada 26-yard field goal (Drive: 7 plays, 9 yards, 4:24; MICH 24–7)

On October 18, Michigan defeated Washington, 24–7, before a crowd of 110,701 at Michigan Stadium. Michigan opened the scoring in the first quarter via a 22-yard touchdown pass from Bryce Underwood to Andrew Marsh. Washington scored the only points of the second quarter via a one-yard touchdown run by Jonah Coleman with 40 seconds remaining in the half to tie the game. Michigan regained the lead in the third quarter via a 14-yard touchdown run by Jordan Marshall. Michigan scored ten points in the fourth quarter via a ten-yard touchdown pass from Underwood to Zack Marshall and a 26-yard field goal by Dominic Zvada. Michigan scored 17 points off three Washington turnovers. Michigan's defense forced four punts, holding the Huskies to 54 yards in the second half. Entering the game, the Huskies were averaging 39.2 points per game, the fourth best in the Big Ten.

Statistics	WASH	MICH
First downs	14	23
Plays–yards	55–249	68–417
Rushes–yards	23–40	40–187
Passing yards	209	230
Passing: comp–att–int	20–32–3	21–28–0
Turnovers	3	0
Time of possession	22:31	37:29

Team	Category	Player	Statistics
Washington	Passing	Demond Williams Jr.	20/32, 209 yards, 3 INT
Washington	Rushing	Jonah Coleman	16 carries, 50 yards, TD
Washington	Receiving	Denzel Boston	4 receptions, 71 yards
Michigan	Passing	Bryce Underwood	21/27, 230 yards, 2 TD
Michigan	Rushing	Jordan Marshall	25 carries, 133 yards, TD
Michigan	Receiving	Zack Marshall	5 receptions, 72 yards, TD

=== at Michigan State ===
No. 25 Michigan Wolverines (5–2) at Michigan State Spartans (3–4) – Game summary

Quarter	1	2	3	4	Total
No. 25 Wolverines	10	0	14	7	31
Spartans	0	7	0	13	20

at Spartan Stadium • East Lansing, Michigan

- Date: October 25
- Game time: 7:30 p.m.
- Game weather: 48 °F (9 °C), sunny, NE 5 miles per hour (8.0 km/h)
- Game attendance: 75,085
- Referee: Ron Snodgrass
- TV announcers (NBC): Noah Eagle (play-by-play), Todd Blackledge (color commentator), and Kathryn Tappen (sideline reporter)

Game information

First quarter

- (10:07) MICH – Dominic Zvada 21-yard field goal (Drive: 10 plays, 31 yards, 4:07; MICH 3–0)
- (3:58) MICH – Bryce Underwood 13-yard run (Dominic Zvada kick) (Drive: 7 plays, 63 yards, 3:18; MICH 10–0)

Second quarter

- (8:24) MSU – Aidan Chiles 1-yard run (Martin Connington kick) (Drive: 10 plays, 73 yards, 6:36; MICH 10–7)

Third quarter

- (11:50) MICH – Justice Haynes 5-yard run (Dominic Zvada kick) (Drive: 7 plays, 71 yards, 3:02; MICH 17–7)
- (3:08) MICH – Justice Haynes 14-yard run (Dominic Zvada kick) (Drive: 5 plays, 52 yards, 2:38; MICH 24–7)

Fourth quarter

- (12:34) MSU – Brandon Tullis 1-yard run (pass failed) (Drive: 12 plays, 75 yards, 5:34; MICH 24–13)
- (2:48) MICH – Jordan Marshall 56-yard run (Dominic Zvada kick) (Drive: 5 plays, 71 yards, 1:49; MICH 31–13)
- (0:07) MSU – Michael Masunas 21-yard pass from Alessio Milivojevic (Martin Connington kick) (Drive: 9 plays, 75 yards, 2:41; Michigan 31–20)

On October 25, Michigan faced their in-state rivals, the Michigan State Spartans, in the annual battle for the Paul Bunyan Trophy. Michigan defeated Michigan State 31–20, before a crowd of 75,085 at Spartan Stadium in East Lansing, Michigan. On the game's first drive, Brandyn Hillman forced a fumble which was recovered by Jimmy Rolder at the Michigan State 34-yard line. This resulted in a 21-yard field goal by Dominic Zvada. Michigan extended their lead via a 13-yard touchdown run by Bryce Underwood. Michigan State scored the only points of the second quarter via a one-yard touchdown run by Aidan Chiles, making the score 10-7 in favor of Michigan at halftime. Michigan scored 14 points in the third quarter via two rushing touchdowns by Justice Haynes, from five-yards, and 14-yards, respectively. Michigan State opened the scoring in the fourth quarter via a one-yard touchdown run by Brandon Tullis, and a failed two-point conversion. Michigan responded with a 56-yard touchdown run by Jordan Marshall. Michigan State scored the final points of the game via a 21-yard touchdown pass from Alessio Milivojevic to Michael Masunas with seven seconds remaining in the game. Defensively Michigan held Michigan State to five conversions on 16 third-down attempts.

Michigan tallied 276 rushing yards in the game, led by Justice Haynes with 152 yards and two touchdowns and Jordan Marshall with 110 yards and one touchdown. This marked the first time in the rivalry series against Michign State that Michigan had two running backs rush for over 100 yards since 1994.

Statistics	MICH	MSU
First downs	20	18
Plays–yards	66–362	72–305
Rushes–yards	49–276	38–115
Passing yards	86	190
Passing: comp–att–int	8–17–0	19–34–0
Turnovers	1	1
Time of possession	30:33	29:27

Team	Category	Player	Statistics
Michigan	Passing	Bryce Underwood	8/17, 86 yards
Michigan	Rushing	Justice Haynes	26 carries, 152 yards, 2 TD
Michigan	Receiving	Andrew Marsh	3 receptions, 54 yards
Michigan State	Passing	Aidan Chiles	14/28, 130 yards
Michigan State	Rushing	Makhi Frazier	14 carries, 109 yards
Michigan State	Receiving	Nick Marsh	6 receptions, 75 yards

=== vs Purdue ===
Purdue Boilermakers (2–6) at No. 21 Michigan Wolverines (6–2) – Game summary

Quarter	1	2	3	4	Total
Boilermakers	0	7	3	6	16
No. 21 Wolverines	7	7	0	7	21

at Michigan Stadium • Ann Arbor, Michigan

- Date: November 1
- Game time: 7:00 p.m.
- Game weather: 47 °F (8 °C), cloudy, NW 2 miles per hour (3.2 km/h)
- Game attendance: 110,517
- Referee: Brian Banks
- TV announcers (BTN): Jeff Levering (play-by-play), Jake Butt (color commentator), and Brooke Fletcher (sideline reporter)

Game information

First quarter

- (1:25) MICH – Jordan Marshall 54-yard run (Dominic Zvada kick) (Drive: 2 plays, 79 yards, 0:18; MICH 7–0)

Second quarter

- (6:55) PUR – Antonio Harris 2-yard run (Spencer Porath kick) (Drive: 16 plays, 75 yards, 9:30; Tied 7–7)
- (0:17) MICH – Jordan Marshall 3-yard run (Dominic Zvada kick) (Drive: 5 plays, 32 yards, 0:41; MICH 14–7)

Third quarter

- (9:00) PUR – Spencer Porath 50-yard field goal (Drive: 10 plays, 35 yards, 4:20; MICH 14–10)

Fourth quarter

- (10:03) MICH – Jordan Marshall 9-yard run (Dominic Zvada kick) (Drive: 9 plays, 50 yards, 4:51; MICH 21–10)
- (6:00) PUR – Malachi Thomas 5-yard pass from Ryan Browne (pass failed) (Drive: 9 plays, 67 yards, 3:56; MICH 21–16)

On November 1, Michigan defeated Purdue, 21–16, before a crowd of 110,517 at Michigan Stadium. Michigan opened the scoring in the first quarter via a 54-yard touchdown run by Jordan Marshall. Purdue finally got on the board in the second quarter via a two-yard touchdown run by Antonio Harris to tie the game. Michigan responded with a three-yard touchdown run by Marshall with 17 seconds remaining in the half, which made the score 14-7 in favor of Michigan at halftime. Purdue scored the only points of the third quarter via a 50-yard field goal by Spencer Porath. Michigan extended their lead in the fourth quarter via a nine-yard touchdown run by Marshall. Purdue responded with a five-yard touchdown pass from Ryan Browne to Malachi Thomas, and a failed two-point conversion attempt.

Running back Jordan Marshall rushed for a career-high 185 yards on 25 carries, and recorded three touchdowns. His 185 yards are the most by a Wolverine player since Donovan Edwards rushed for 216 yards against Ohio State in 2022.

Statistics	PUR	MICH
First downs	18	20
Plays–yards	65–276	61–398
Rushes–yards	39–198	39–253
Passing yards	138	145
Passing: comp–att–int	20–26–0	13–22–1
Turnovers	1	2
Time of possession	32:55	27:05

Team	Category	Player	Statistics
Purdue	Passing	Ryan Browne	19/24, 133 yards, TD
Purdue	Rushing	Malachi Thomas	15 carries, 68 yards
Purdue	Receiving	Michael Jackson III	6 receptions, 58 yards
Michigan	Passing	Bryce Underwood	13/22, 145 yards, INT
Michigan	Rushing	Jordan Marshall	25 carries, 185 yards, 3 TD
Michigan	Receiving	Zack Marshall	3 receptions, 58 yards

=== at Northwestern ===
No. 18 Michigan Wolverines (7–2) at Northwestern Wildcats (5–4) – Game summary

Quarter	1	2	3	4	Total
No. 18 Wolverines	0	7	14	3	24
Wildcats	0	6	3	13	22

at Wrigley Field • Chicago, Illinois

- Date: November 15
- Game time: 12:00 p.m.
- Game weather: 66 °F (19 °C), cloudy, SW 15 miles per hour (24 km/h)
- Game attendance: 38,223
- Referee: Tim ODey
- TV announcers (FOX): Gus Johnson (play-by-play), Joel Klatt (color commentator), and Jenny Taft (sideline reporter)

Game information

First quarter

- No scoring plays

Second quarter

- (13:11) MICH – Jordan Marshall 1-yard run (Dominic Zvada kick) (Drive: 12 plays, 91 yards, 5:45; MICH 7–0)
- (5:22) NW – Jack Olsen 34-yard field goal (Drive: 10 plays, 38 yards, 5:50; MICH 7–3)
- (1:00) NW – Jack Olsen 26-yard field goal (Drive: 7 plays, 39 yards, 1:18; MICH 7–6)

Third quarter

- (10:29) MICH – Bryce Underwood 9-yard run (Dominic Zvada kick) (Drive: 5 plays, 85 yards, 2:13; MICH 14–6)
- (6:09) NW – Jack Olsen 35-yard field goal (Drive: 6 plays, 19 yards, 3:08; MICH 14–9)
- (0:41) MICH – Jordan Marshall 1-yard run (Dominic Zvada kick) (Drive: 10 plays, 80 yards, 5:23; MICH 21–9)

Fourth quarter

- (13:00) NW – Preston Stone 1-yard run (Jack Olsen kick) (Drive: 7 plays, 75 yards, 2:40; MICH 21–16)
- (12:05) NW – Caleb Komolafe 6-yard run (pass failed) (Drive: 1 play, 6 yards, 0:05; NW 22–21)
- (0:00) MICH – Dominic Zvada 31-yard field goal (Drive: 11 plays, 50 yards, 2:10; MICH 24–22)

On November 15, Michigan defeated Northwestern, 24–22, at Wrigley Field in Chicago. After a scoreless first quarter, Michigan opened the scoring in the second quarter via a one-yard touchdown run by Jordan Marshall. Northwestern responded with two field goals by Jack Olsen from 34-yards. and 26-yards, respectively. Michigan led, 7–6, at halftime. Michigan scored 14 points in the third quarter via a nine-yard touchdown run by Bryce Underwood and a one-yard touchdown run by Marshall. Northwestern responded with a 35-yard field goal by Olsen. The Wolverines held the Wildcats to just three field goals in the first three quarters, but gave up two touchdowns within a one-minute span in the fourth quarter. Northwestern scored 13 points in the fourth quarter via a one-yard touchdown run by Preston Stone and a six-yard touchdown run by Caleb Komolafe to take their first lead of the game. Despite turning the ball over five times and missing two field goals, Dominic Zvada kicked a 31-yard field goal as time expired to win the game. Michigan's defense held Northwestern to 61 rushing yards and 2.3 yards per carry, both season lows for the Wildcats. They also held Northwestern to two of 12 on third down conversions.

Quarterback Bryce Underwood completed 21 of 32 passes for a career-high 280 yards, but also threw two interceptions and was responsible for a fumble on a botched handoff in the fourth quarter. Running back Jordan Marshall tallied 142 yards on 19 carries before leaving the game with a shoulder injury. Freshman wide receiver Andrew Marsh caught 12 passes for 189 yards, both single-game Michigan freshmen records. Marsh eclipsed 100 receiving yards for the second time this season, and became the first Michigan freshman wide receiver to record multiple 100-yard performances since Roy Roundtree in 2009. His 189 yards is tied for the sixth-most receiving yards in a game in program history and the most since Jehu Chesson recorded 207 yards in 2015.

Statistics	MICH	NU
First downs	25	11
Plays–yards	77–496	53–245
Rushes–yards	45–216	26–61
Passing yards	280	184
Passing: comp–att–int	21–32–2	13–27–0
Turnovers	5	0
Time of possession	33:06	26:53

Team	Category	Player	Statistics
Michigan	Passing	Bryce Underwood	21/32, 280 yards, 2 INT
Michigan	Rushing	Jordan Marshall	19 carries, 142 yards, 2 TD
Michigan	Receiving	Andrew Marsh	12 receptions, 189 yards
Northwestern	Passing	Preston Stone	13/27, 184 yards
Northwestern	Rushing	Caleb Komolafe	12 carries, 31 yards, TD
Northwestern	Receiving	Hunter Welcing	4 receptions, 81 yards

=== at Maryland ===
No. 18 Michigan Wolverines (8–2) at Maryland Terrapins (4–6) – Game summary

Quarter	1	2	3	4	Total
No. 18 Wolverines	7	14	14	10	45
Terrapins	7	3	3	7	20

at SECU Stadium • College Park, Maryland

- Date: November 22
- Game time: 4:00 p.m. EST
- Game weather: 56 °F (13 °C), cloudy, NW 6 miles per hour (9.7 km/h)
- Game attendance: 46,185
- Referee: Gregory Blum
- TV announcers (BTN): Jeff Levering (play-by-play), Jake Butt (color commentator), and Brooke Fletcher (sideline reporter)

Game information

First quarter

- (10:28) MD – Dorian Fleming 1-yard pass from Malik Washington (Sean O'Haire kick) (Drive: 10 plays, 75 yards, 4:32; MD 7–0)
- (7:05) MICH – Andrew Marsh 12-yard pass from Bryce Underwood (Dominic Zvada kick) (Drive: 7 plays, 47 yards, 3:21; Tied 7–7)

Second quarter

- (14:17) MICH – Bryson Kuzdzal 2-yard run (Dominic Zvada kick) (Drive: 12 plays, 83 yards, 5:25; MICH 14–7)
- (12:28) MICH – Donaven McCulley 22-yard pass from Bryce Underwood (Dominic Zvada kick) (Drive: 3 plays, 23 yards, 1:09; MICH 21–7)
- (7:03) MD – Sean O'Haire 34-yard field goal (Drive: 12 plays, 59 yards, 5:25; MICH 21–10)

Third quarter

- (11:35) MICH – Bryson Kuzdzal 19-yard run (Dominic Zvada kick) (Drive: 8 plays, 65 yards, 3:25; MICH 28–10)
- (7:34) MD – Sean O'Haire 29-yard field goal (Drive: 12 plays, 64 yards, 4:01; MICH 28–13)
- (4:09) MICH – Bryson Kuzdzal 1-yard run (Dominic Zvada kick) (Drive: 7 plays, 47 yards, 3:16; MICH 35–13)

Fourth quarter

- (13:19) MICH – Jasper Parker 6-yard run (Dominic Zvada kick) (Drive: 6 plays, 37 yards, 2:37; MICH 42–13)
- (7:20) MICH – Dominic Zvada 46-yard field goal (Drive: 7 plays, 14 yards, 4:21; MICH 45–13)
- (5:55) MD – Jalil Farooq 0-yard pass from Khristian Martin (Sean O'Haire kick) (Drive: 4 plays, 75 yards, 1:24; MICH 45–20)

On November 22, Michigan defeated Maryland, 45–20, before a crowd of 46,185 at SECU Stadium in College Park, Maryland. Maryland opened the scoring in the first quarter via a one-yard touchdown pass from Malik Washington to Dorian Fleming. Michigan responded with a 12-yard touchdown pass from Bryce Underwood to Andrew Marsh to tie the game. Michigan scored 14 points in the second quarter via a two-yard touchdown run by Bryson Kuzdzal and a 22-yard touchdown pass from Underwood to Donaven McCulley. Maryland scored the final points of the half via a 34-yard field goal by Sean O'Haire. Michigan led, 21–10, at halftime. Michigan scored 14 points in the third quarter via two touchdown runs by Kuzdzal, from 19-yards, and one-yard, respectively. Maryland responded with a 29-yard field goal by O'Haire. Michigan scored ten points in the fourth quarter via a six-yard touchdown run by Jasper Parker and a 46-yard field goal by Dominic Zvada. Maryland scored the final points of the game via a touchdown pass from Khristian Martin to Jalil Farooq. Michigan's defense held Maryland to 71 rushing yards and five-of-14 on third-down conversion opportunities. Fullback Max Bredeson left the game in the third quarter with an injury.

Quarterback Bryce Underwood completed 16 of 23 passes for a 215 yards and two touchdowns, his seventh 200-plus yard passing game this season, tying Chad Henne for the most by a first-year starting quarterback at Michigan. Underwood passed Tate Forcier (2,050 yards in 2009) for the second-most yards by a first-year starting quarterback (2,166). Running back Bryson Kuzdzal made his first career start, replacing the injured Jordan Marshall, and tallied 100 yards on 20 carries and three touchdowns. He became the third Wolverine running back this season to record a three-touchdown game, joining Justice Haynes and Marshall. He also became the fourth different Wolverine to reach 100 rushing yards this season. The last time Michigan had four different players each record at least one 100-plus yard rushing game was in 1998.

Statistics	MICH	MD
First downs	27	21
Plays–yards	73–443	68–347
Rushes–yards	50–228	25–71
Passing yards	215	276
Passing: comp–att–int	16–23–0	22–43–1
Turnovers	0	1
Time of possession	35:38	24:22

Team	Category	Player	Statistics
Michigan	Passing	Bryce Underwood	16/23, 215 yards, 2 TD
Michigan	Rushing	Bryson Kuzdzal	20 carries, 100 yards, 3 TD
Michigan	Receiving	Andrew Marsh	5 receptions, 76 yards, TD
Maryland	Passing	Malik Washington	19/39, 210 yards, TD, INT
Maryland	Rushing	DeJuan Williams	12 carries, 40 yards
Maryland	Receiving	Shaleak Knotts	4 receptions, 82 yards

=== vs No. 1 Ohio State ===
No. 1 Ohio State Buckeyes (11–0) at No. 15 Michigan Wolverines (9–2) – Game summary

Quarter	1	2	3	4	Total
No. 1 Buckeyes	3	14	7	3	27
No. 15 Wolverines	6	3	0	0	9

at Michigan Stadium • Ann Arbor, Michigan

- Date: November 29
- Game time: 12:00 p.m.
- Game weather: 29 °F (−2 °C), snow, SE 8 miles per hour (13 km/h)
- Game attendance: 111,373
- Referee: Kole Knueppel
- TV announcers (FOX): Gus Johnson (play-by-play), Joel Klatt (color commentator), Jenny Taft, and Tom Rinaldi (sideline reporters)

Game information

First quarter

- (12:37) MICH – Dominic Zvada 45-yard field goal (Drive: 6 plays, 48 yards, 2:23; MICH 3–0)
- (9:42) MICH – Dominic Zvada 25-yard field goal (Drive: 6 plays, 32 yards, 2:40; MICH 6–0)
- (4:33) OSU – Jayden Fielding 24-yard field goal (Drive: 11 plays, 69 yards, 5:09; MICH 6–3)

Second quarter

- (11:44) OSU – Jeremiah Smith 35-yard pass from Julian Sayin (Jayden Fielding kick) (Drive: 10 plays, 63 yards, 5:49; OSU 10–6)
- (5:24) MICH – Dominic Zvada 49-yard field goal (Drive: 11 plays, 54 yards, 6:17; OSU 10–9)
- (0:16) OSU – Brandon Inniss 4-yard pass from Julian Sayin (Jayden Fielding kick) (Drive: 11 plays, 87 yards, 5:08; OSU 17–9)

Third quarter

- (7:35) OSU – Carnell Tate 50-yard pass from Julian Sayin (Jayden Fielding kick) (Drive: 2 plays, 57 yards, 0:45; OSU 24–9)

Fourth quarter

- (8:10) OSU – Jayden Fielding 23-yard field goal (Drive: 20 plays, 81 yards, 11:56; OSU 27–9)

On November 29, Michigan lost to Ohio State, 9–27, before a crowd of 111,373 at Michigan Stadium. Michigan opened the scoring in the first quarter via a 45-yard field goal by Dominic Zvada. Michigan extended their lead via a 25-yard field goal by Zvada. Ohio State responded with a 24-yard field goal by Jayden Fielding. Ohio State extended their lead in the second quarter via a 35-yard touchdown pass from Julian Sayin to Jeremiah Smith. Michigan responded with a 49-yard field goal by Zvada. Ohio State scored the final points of the half via a four-yard touchdown pass from Sayin to Brandon Inniss. Ohio State led, 17–9, at halftime. Ohio State held Michigan scoreless in the second half. Ohio State extended their lead in the third quarter via a 50-yard touchdown pass from Sayin to Carnell Tate. Ohio State scored the final points of the game via a 23-yard field goal by Fielding. The loss ended a four-game winning streak against Ohio State. Michigan recorded 163 yards in the game, its lowest total of 2025. Michigan's offense failed to score a touchdown for the first time since September 6, 2014, against Notre Dame.

With his two field goals from 40-plus yards, Dominic Zvada tied Jake Moody for the most such field goals in program history with 17.

Statistics	OSU	MICH
First downs	23	9
Plays–yards	73–419	42–163
Rushes–yards	47–186	24–100
Passing yards	233	63
Passing: comp–att–int	19–26–1	8–18–1
Turnovers	1	1
Time of possession	40:01	19:59

Team	Category	Player	Statistics
Ohio State	Passing	Julian Sayin	19/26, 233 yards, 3 TD, INT
Ohio State	Rushing	Lamar "Bo" Jackson	22 carries, 117 yards
Ohio State	Receiving	Carnell Tate	5 receptions, 82 yards, TD
Michigan	Passing	Bryce Underwood	8/18, 63 yards, INT
Michigan	Rushing	Jordan Marshall	7 carries, 61 yards
Michigan	Receiving	Donaven McCulley	3 receptions, 46 yards

=== vs. No. 13 Texas—Citrus Bowl ===
2025 Cheez-It Citrus Bowl
No. 18 Michigan Wolverines (9–3) vs. No. 13 Texas Longhorns (9–3) – Game summary

Quarter	1	2	3	4	Total
No. 18 Wolverines	10	7	3	7	27
No. 13 Longhorns	3	14	7	17	41

at Camping World Stadium • Orlando, FL

- Date: December 31
- Game time: 3:00 p.m. EST
- Game weather: 57 °F (14 °C), sunny, NW 9 miles per hour (14 km/h)
- Game attendance: 47,316
- Referee: Mike Roche (ACC)
- TV announcers (ABC): Mark Jones (play-by-play), Roddy Jones (analyst), and Alyssa Lang (sideline)

Game information

First quarter

- (12:05) TEX – Mason Shipley 43-yard field goal (Drive: 9 plays, 50 yards, 2:55; TEX 3–0)
- (4:01) MICH – Dominic Zvada 53-yard field goal (Drive: 9 plays, 40 yards, 3:49; Tied 3–3)
- (3:18) MICH – Kendrick Bell 19-yard pass from Bryce Underwood (Dominic Zvada kick) (Drive: 3 plays, 23 yards, 0:41; MICH 10–3)

Second quarter

- (13:43) TEX – Christian Clark 3-yard run (Mason Shipley kick) (Drive: 11 plays, 75 yards, 4:32; Tied 10–10)
- (10:17) MICH – Andrew Marsh 4-yard pass from Bryce Underwood (Dominic Zvada kick) (Drive: 7 plays, 69 yards, 3:19; MICH 17–10)
- (7:41) TEX – Jack Endries 17-yard pass from Arch Manning (Mason Shipley kick) (Drive: 8 plays, 74 yards, 2:31; Tied 17–17)

Third quarter

- (9:37) MICH – Dominic Zvada 31-yard field goal (Drive: 12 plays, 41 yards, 5:13; MICH 20–17)
- (5:38) TEX – Arch Manning 23-yard run (Mason Shipley kick) (Drive: 9 plays, 80 yards, 3:55; TEX 24–20)

Fourth quarter

- (10:56) MICH – Bryce Underwood 5-yard run (Dominic Zvada kick) (Drive: 11 plays, 45 yards, 5:20; MICH 27–24)
- (6:58) TEX – Kaliq Lockett 30-yard pass from Arch Manning (Mason Shipley kick) (Drive: 9 plays, 75 yards, 4:02; TEX 31–27)
- (5:06) TEX – Arch Manning 60-yard run (Mason Shipley kick) (Drive: 1 play, 60 yards, 0:09; TEX 38–27)
- (3:38) TEX – Mason Shipley 51-yard field goal (Drive: 4 plays, 1 yard, 0:55; TEX 41–27)

On December 31, Michigan lost to Texas 27–41 in the 2025 Citrus Bowl. Texas opened the scoring in the first quarter via a 43-yard field goal by Mason Shipley. Michigan scored ten points in the quarter via a 53-yard field goal by Dominic Zvada and a 19-yard touchdown pass from Bryce Underwood to Kendrick Bell, to take their first lead of the game. Texas tied the game in the second quarter via a three-yard touchdown run by Christian Clark. Michigan responded with a four-yard touchdown pass from Underwood to Andrew Marsh to regain the lead. Texas scored the final points of the half via a 17-yard touchdown pass from Arch Manning to Jack Endries. The score was tied, 17–17, at halftime. Michigan opened the scoring in the second half via a 31-yard field goal by Zvada. Texas responded with a 23-yard touchdown run by Manning to regain the lead. Michigan regained the lead in the fourth quarter via a five-yard touchdown run by Underwood. Texas responded with 17 unanswered points in the quarter via a 30-yard touchdown pass from Manning to Kaliq Lockett, a 60-yard touchdown run by Manning, and a 51-yard field goal by Shipley. The game featured seven lead changes. Texas' defense forced three turnovers in the final 18 minutes of the game to secure the Citrus Bowl title. With the loss, Michigan fell to 0–3 in games against Texas.

Michigan finished with 373 yards of total offense, marking the team's 11th game this season with 300-plus yards. Wide receiver Andrew Marsh finished the season ranked first all-time among freshmen pass-catchers in yards (651), second in receptions (45) and third in touchdown receptions (four). Dominic Zvada made his 18th career field goal of 40-plus yards, breaking a tie with Jake Moody for the most career conversions of 40-plus yards in program history.

Statistics	MICH	TEX
First downs	19	24
Plays–yards	73–373	76–456
Rushes–yards	32–174	39–230
Passing yards	199	221
Passing: comp–att–int	23–42–3	21–34–0
Turnovers	3	1
Time of possession	33:08	26:52

Team	Category	Player	Statistics
Michigan	Passing	Bryce Underwood	23–42, 199 yards, 2 TD, 3 INT
Michigan	Rushing	Bryson Kuzdzal	20 carries, 82 yards
Michigan	Receiving	Donaven McCulley	4 receptions, 54 yards
Texas	Passing	Arch Manning	21–34, 221 yards, 2 TD
Texas	Rushing	Arch Manning	9 carries, 155 yards, 2 TD
Texas	Receiving	Ryan Wingo	4 receptions, 64 yards

== Personnel ==
=== Roster ===
2025 Michigan Wolverines football team roster
Players
Coaches
Offense

Pos.	#	Name	Class
WR	0	Semaj Morgan	Jr
WR	1	Donaven McCulley	Sr
QB	2	Jadyn Davis	Fr
WR	3	Fredrick Moore	Jr
WR	4	Andrew Marsh	Fr
WR	5	Anthony Simpson	Sr
WR	6	Jamar Browder	Fr
QB	7	Mikey Keene	Sr
WR	8	I'Marion Stewart (injured)	Fr
WR	9	Channing Goodwin	Fr
WR	10	Kendrick Bell	So
QB	12	Jake Garcia	Sr
QB	15	Chase Herbstreit	Fr
QB	16	Davis Warren (injured)	Sr
TE	17	Marlin Klein (C)	Jr
QB	19	Bryce Underwood	Fr
RB	22	Justice Haynes (injured)	Jr
RB	23	Jordan Marshall	Fr
RB	24	Bryson Kuzdzal	So
RB	25	Micah Ka'apana	Fr
RB	26	Donovan Johnson (injured)	Fr
RB	27	Jasper Parker	Fr
RB	32	John Volker	Sr
RB	36	Tomas O'Meara	Fr
WR	38	Bryce Wilcox	Jr
WR	39	Joe Taylor	Sr
TE	42	Jalen Hoffman	So
TE, FB	44	Max Bredeson (C)	Sr
TE	45	Eli Owens	Fr
TE	46	Crandall Quinn	Jr
OL	50	Luke Hamilton	Fr
OL	51	Greg Crippen	Sr
OL	53	Jake Guarnera	Fr
OL	54	Andrew Sprague	Fr
OL	55	Nathan Efobi	So
OL	58	Giovanni El-Hadi (C)	Sr
OL	60	Brooks Bahr	So
OL, LS	64	James Kavouklis	Jr
OL	65	Andrew Babalola (injured)	Fr
OL	66	Dan Taraboi	Jr
OL	70	Brady Norton	So
OL	71	Evan Link	So
OL	73	Ben Roebuck	Fr
OL	74	Avery Gach	Fr
OL	75	Kaden Strayhorn	Fr
OL	76	Connor Jones	Jr
OL	77	Blake Frazier	Fr
OL	78	Lawrence Hattar	Sr
OL	79	Ty Haywood	Fr
TE	80	Hogan Hansen (injured)	So
WR	81	Peyton O'Leary	Sr
WR	82	C.J. Charleston (injured)	Sr
TE	83	Zack Marshall	So
WR	84	Jacob Washington	Fr
WR	85	Logan Forbes	Jr
TE	86	Brady Prieskorn	Fr
TE	88	Deakon Tonielli	So
WR	89	Kaleb Schlecht	So

Defense

Pos.	#	Name	Class
DL	0	Tré Williams	Sr
LB	1	Jaishawn Barham	Sr
DB	2	Shamari Earls	Fr
DB	3	Jaden Mangham	Jr
EDGE	4	TJ Guy	Sr
DB	5	Jacob Oden	Fr
DB	6	Brandyn Hillman	Jr
DB	7	TJ Metcalf	Jr
EDGE	8	Derrick Moore (C)	Sr
EDGE	9	Cameron Brandt	Jr
DB	10	Zeke Berry	Jr
LB	12	Nathaniel Owusu-Boateng	Fr
DB	13	Caleb Anderson	Sr
DB	14	Jordan Young	Fr
LB	15	Ernest Hausmann (C)	Sr
DB	16	Jo'Ziah Edmond	So
DL	17	Enow Etta	So
LB	18	Troy Bowles	So
DB	19	Rod Moore (injured) (C)	Sr
DB	20	Jyaire Hill	So
DB	22	Elijah Dotson	Fr
LB	23	Cole Sullivan	So
DB	24	Tevis Metcalf	So
DB	25	Mason Curtis	So
DL	26	Rayshaun Benny	Sr
DB	27	Jayden Sanders	Fr
DB	28	Kainoa Winston	Fr
LB	29	Chase Taylor	Fr
LB	30	Jimmy Rolder	Sr
DB	31	Nico Andrighetto	Jr
DB	32	Jeremiah Lowe	Fr
EDGE	33	Dominic Nichols	Fr
LB	34	Jaydon Hood (injured)	Sr
DB	36	Joshua Nichols	Jr
EDGE	37	Julius Holly	Fr
DB	39	Max Reyes	Jr
LB	40	Rocco Milia	Sr
DB	41	Shomari Stone	Jr
DB	42	Jeffrey Chukwu	Fr
LB	43	Zach Ludwig	Fr
DL	44	Damon Payne	Sr
LB	49	Adam Bazzi	Fr
DL	54	Deyvid Palepale	Fr
DL	57	Travis Moten	Fr
LB	59	John Weidenbach	So
DL	76	Manuel Beigel	Fr
EDGE	82	Devon Baxter (injured)	Fr
EDGE	85	Randy Keumogne	Sr
EDGE	88	Lugard Edokpayi	Fr
DL	90	Ted Hammond	Fr
DL	92	Ike Iwunnah	Sr
DL	93	Benny Patterson III	Fr
EDGE	94	Nate Marshall	Fr
DL	95	Trey Pierce	Jr
DL	97	Chibi Anwunah	Jr
DL	99	Bobby Kanka	Fr

Special teams

Pos.	#	Name	Class
K	35	Stuart Blake	Fr
LS	45	Greg Tarr	Sr
LS	67	Trent Middleton	So
LS	68	Dan Rosenberg	So
P	90	Hudson Hollenbeck	Jr
LS	91	Evan Boutorwick	Jr
K, P	92	Beckham Sunderland	Sr
P	93	Hunter Robertson	Jr
K	96	Dominic Zvada	Sr

Head coach

- Sherrone Moore

Coordinators/assistant coaches

- Biff Poggi (associate, interim head coach)
- Don Martindale (defensive coordinator)
- Chip Lindsey (offensive coordinator / quarterbacks)
- Steve Casula (co-offensive coordinator / tight ends)
- J.B. Brown (special teams coordinator; fired Dec. 3)
- Kerry Coombs (special teams coordinator; bowl game)
- Tony Alford (running backs / run game coordinator)
- Ronald Bellamy (wide receivers / pass game coordinator)
- Grant Newsome (offensive line)
- LaMar Morgan (defensive backs / defensive pass game coordinator)
- Brian Jean-Mary (linebackers / defensive run game coordinator)
- Lou Esposito (defensive line)
- Justin Tress (strength and conditioning coach)

Support staff

- Erik Campbell (assistant wide receivers)
- Juan Castillo (senior assistant offensive line)
- Jack Clark (assistant tight ends & running backs)
- Garrett Clawson (assistant special teams)
- David Denham (assistant defensive line)
- Nick Gilbert (assistant offensive line)
- Brad Hawkins (assistant defensive backs)
- Bret Ingalls (senior offensive analyst)
- Fred Jackson (senior offensive analyst / running backs)
- Grant Kurzner (special teams analyst)
- Ty Martindale (assistant linebackers)
- Tyler McLaurin (assistant outside linebackers)
- Pernell McPhee (outside linebackers)
- John Morookian (assistant offensive line)
- Josh Sinagoga (assistant quarterbacks)
- Lionel Stokes (safeties)

Legend

- (C) Team captain
- (S) Suspended
- (I) Ineligible
- Injured
- Redshirt

Roster
Last update: August 21, 2025

=== 2025 recruiting class ===
College recruiting
Name	Hometown	School	Height	Weight	Commit date
Bryce Underwood; QB	Detroit, Michigan	Belleville High School	6 ft 4 in (1.93 m)	208 lb (94 kg)	Nov 21, 2024
Bryce Underwood; QB	Recruit ratings: Rivals: 247Sports: ESPN:				
Andrew Babalola; OL	Overland Park, Kansas	Blue Valley Northwest High School	6 ft 6 in (1.98 m)	300 lb (140 kg)	Oct 21, 2024
Andrew Babalola; OL	Recruit ratings: Rivals: 247Sports: ESPN:				
Ty Haywood; OL	Denton, Texas	Billy Ryan High School	6 ft 5 in (1.96 m)	295 lb (134 kg)	Feb 5, 2025
Ty Haywood; OL	Recruit ratings: Rivals: 247Sports: ESPN:				
Nathaniel Marshall; EDGE	Oak Park, Illinois	Fenwick High School	6 ft 3 in (1.91 m)	240 lb (110 kg)	Dec 3, 2024
Nathaniel Marshall; EDGE	Recruit ratings: Rivals: 247Sports: ESPN:				
Andrew Marsh; WR	Fulshear, Texas	Jordan High School	6 ft 0 in (1.83 m)	175 lb (79 kg)	Aug 20, 2024
Andrew Marsh; WR	Recruit ratings: Rivals: 247Sports: ESPN:				
Shamari Earls; DB	Chester, Virginia	Thomas Dale High School	6 ft 2 in (1.88 m)	203 lb (92 kg)	Nov 1, 2024
Shamari Earls; DB	Recruit ratings: Rivals: 247Sports: ESPN:				
Kainoa Winston; DB	Washington, D.C.	Gonzaga College High School	5 ft 11 in (1.80 m)	194 lb (88 kg)	Jun 14, 2024
Kainoa Winston; DB	Recruit ratings: Rivals: 247Sports: ESPN:				
Nathaniel Owusu-Boateng; LB	Hyattsville, Maryland	IMG Academy	6 ft 1 in (1.85 m)	203 lb (92 kg)	Dec 4, 2024
Nathaniel Owusu-Boateng; LB	Recruit ratings: Rivals: 247Sports: ESPN:				
Jordan Young; DB	Monroe, North Carolina	Monroe High School	6 ft 0 in (1.83 m)	177 lb (80 kg)	Dec 1, 2024
Jordan Young; DB	Recruit ratings: Rivals: 247Sports: ESPN:				
Jacob Washington; WR	Marrero, Louisiana	Archbishop Shaw High School	6 ft 3 in (1.91 m)	183 lb (83 kg)	Jun 24, 2024
Jacob Washington; WR	Recruit ratings: Rivals: 247Sports: ESPN:				
Elijah Dotson; DB	Detroit, Michigan	Belleville High School	6 ft 2 in (1.88 m)	171 lb (78 kg)	Nov 20, 2024
Elijah Dotson; DB	Recruit ratings: Rivals: 247Sports: ESPN:				
Jayden Sanders; DB	Kilgore, Texas	Kilgore High School	6 ft 1 in (1.85 m)	181 lb (82 kg)	Aug 10, 2024
Jayden Sanders; DB	Recruit ratings: Rivals: 247Sports: ESPN:				
Avery Gach; OL	Franklin, Michigan	Birmingham Groves High School	6 ft 5 in (1.96 m)	287 lb (130 kg)	May 3, 2024
Avery Gach; OL	Recruit ratings: Rivals: 247Sports: ESPN:				
Jasper Parker; RB	Marrero, Louisiana	Archbishop Shaw High School	6 ft 0 in (1.83 m)	211 lb (96 kg)	Jun 15, 2024
Jasper Parker; RB	Recruit ratings: Rivals: 247Sports: ESPN:				
Benny Patterson; DL	Newburgh, Indiana	Castle High School	6 ft 2 in (1.88 m)	240 lb (110 kg)	Nov 1, 2024
Benny Patterson; DL	Recruit ratings: Rivals: 247Sports: ESPN:				
Julius Holly; EDGE	Alpharetta, Georgia	Alpharetta High School	6 ft 4 in (1.93 m)	224 lb (102 kg)	Jun 29, 2024
Julius Holly; EDGE	Recruit ratings: Rivals: 247Sports: ESPN:				
Donovan Johnson; RB	Savannah, Georgia	IMG Academy	6 ft 0 in (1.83 m)	213 lb (97 kg)	Jun 23, 2024
Donovan Johnson; RB	Recruit ratings: Rivals: 247Sports: ESPN:				
Kaden Strayhorn; OL	Novi, Michigan	IMG Academy	6 ft 2 in (1.88 m)	299 lb (136 kg)	Jun 23, 2024
Kaden Strayhorn; OL	Recruit ratings: Rivals: 247Sports: ESPN:				
Bobby Kanka; DL	Howell, Michigan	Howell High School	6 ft 4 in (1.93 m)	289 lb (131 kg)	Aug 1, 2023
Bobby Kanka; DL	Recruit ratings: Rivals: 247Sports: ESPN:				
Eli Owens; TE	Alcoa, Tennessee	Alcoa High School	6 ft 1 in (1.85 m)	223 lb (101 kg)	Jan 4, 2024
Eli Owens; TE	Recruit ratings: Rivals: 247Sports: ESPN:				
Chase Taylor; LB	Stockbridge, Georgia	Stockbridge High School	6 ft 2 in (1.88 m)	213 lb (97 kg)	Jun 24, 2024
Chase Taylor; LB	Recruit ratings: Rivals: 247Sports: ESPN:				
Jamar Browder; WR	Lake Worth, Florida	Santaluces Community High School	6 ft 5 in (1.96 m)	208 lb (94 kg)	Nov 8, 2024
Jamar Browder; WR	Recruit ratings: Rivals: 247Sports: ESPN:				
Travis Moten; DL	Louisville, Kentucky	Fern Creek High School	6 ft 6 in (1.98 m)	296 lb (134 kg)	Dec 4, 2024
Travis Moten; DL	Recruit ratings: Rivals: 247Sports: ESPN:				
Chase Herbstreit; QB	Cincinnati, Ohio	St. Xavier High School	6 ft 2 in (1.88 m)	185 lb (84 kg)	Dec 8, 2024
Chase Herbstreit; QB	Recruit ratings: Rivals: 247Sports: ESPN:				
Overall recruit ranking: Rivals: 6 247Sports: 6
Note: In many cases, Scout, Rivals, 247Sports, On3, and ESPN may conflict in their listings of height and weight.; In these cases, the average was taken. ESPN grades are on a 100-point scale.; Sources: "2025 Michigan football commitments". Rivals.; "2025 Team Ranking". Rivals.com.; "2025 Michigan football commitments". 247Sports.

=== Incoming transfers ===
Michigan incoming transfers
Name	Pos.	Height	Weight	Year	Hometown	Previous team
Caleb Anderson	DB	6'3"	200	GS	Clinton, Louisiana	Louisiana
Troy Bowles	LB	6'0"	220	JR	Tampa, Florida	Georgia
Jake Garcia	QB	6'3"	203	GS	Whittier, California	East Carolina
Lawrence Hattar	OL	6'5"	335	SR	Livonia, Michigan	Ferris State
Justice Haynes	RB	5'11"	210	JR	Buford, Georgia	Alabama
Mikey Keene	QB	5'11"	200	GS	Chandler, Arizona	Fresno State
Donaven McCulley	WR	6'5"	200	GS	Indianapolis, Indiana	Indiana
TJ Metcalf	DB	6'1"	200	JR	Pinson, Alabama	Arkansas
Tevis Metcalf	DB	5'10"	192	SO	Pinson, Alabama	Arkansas
Trent Middleton	LS	6'3"	230	JR	Fullerton, California	UCLA
Rocco Milia	LB	6'2"	225	GS	Birmingham, Michigan	Columbia
Brady Norton	OL	6'3"	275	JR	Mission Viejo, California	Cal Poly
Damon Payne	DL	6'4"	313	GS	Belleville, Michigan	Alabama
Hunter Robertson	P	6'5"	180	JR	Huntington Woods, Michigan	Clarion
Anthony Simpson	WR	5'11"	180	GS	Hartford, Connecticut	UMass
Beckham Sunderland	K / P	6'1"	200	SR	Newport, Kentucky	Texas State
John Volker	RB	6'0"	215	GS	Fair Haven, New Jersey	Princeton
Tré Williams	DL	6'2"	315	GS	Windsor, Connecticut	Clemson

== Awards and honors ==
Weekly awards
Player	Award	Date awarded	Ref.
Bryce Underwood	Big Ten Freshman of the Week	September 15, 2025	
Dominic Zvada	Big Ten Co-Special Teams Player of the Week	September 22, 2025	
Justice Haynes	Big Ten Co-Offensive Player of the Week	October 27, 2025	
Jimmy Rolder	Big Ten Defensive Player of the Week	October 27, 2025	
Jordan Marshall	Big Ten Co-Offensive Player of the Week	November 3, 2025	
Andrew Marsh	Big Ten Freshman of the Week	November 17, 2025	

All-Big Ten
Player	Position	Coaches	Media
Derrick Moore	DL	1	2
Jimmy Rolder	LB	2	2
Zeke Berry	DB	3	2
Jordan Marshall	RB	3	2
Rayshaun Benny	DL	3	3
Max Bredeson	TE	3	Hon.
Giovanni El-Hadi	OL	3	Hon.
Justice Haynes	RB	3	Hon.
Ernest Hausmann	LB	Hon.	3
Greg Tarr	LS	–	3
Jaishawn Barham	LB	Hon.	Hon.
Jake Guarnera	OL	Hon.	Hon.
Jyaire Hill	DB	Hon.	Hon.
Brandyn Hillman	DB	Hon.	Hon.
Marlin Klein	TE	Hon.	Hon.
Andrew Marsh	WR	Hon.	Hon.
Andrew Sprague	OL	Hon.	Hon.
TJ Metcalf	DB	Hon.	–
Dominic Zvada	K	Hon.	–
Greg Crippen	OL	–	Hon.
Trey Pierce	DL	–	Hon.
Hon. = Honorable mention. Reference:

== Statistics ==
=== Offensive statistics ===
Rushing
Player	GP	Att	Net Yards	Yds/Att	TD	Long
Jordan Marshall	11	150	932	6.2	10	65
Justice Haynes	7	121	857	7.1	10	75
Bryce Underwood	13	88	392	4.5	6	37
Bryson Kuzdzal	9	76	326	4.3	4	22
Jasper Parker	6	25	93	3.7	2	11
Tomas O'Meara	2	11	83	7.5	0	37
Micah Ka'apana	4	10	38	3.8	0	11
Semaj Morgan	11	5	25	5.0	0	11
Andrew Marsh	13	2	13	6.5	1	23
Anthony Simpson	4	1	10	10.0	0	10
Donaven McCulley	13	2	5	2.5	0	11
Jadyn Davis	3	1	-6	-6.0	0	-6

Passing
Player	GP	Att	Comp	Comp %	Yds	TD	Int	Long
Bryce Underwood	13	335	202	60.3%	2,428	11	9	69
Jadyn Davis	3	2	0	0.0%	0	0	1	0
Semaj Morgan	11	2	0	0.0%	0	0	0	0
Donaven McCulley	13	1	0	0.0%	0	0	0	0

Receiving
Player	GP	Recp	Yds	Yds/Recp	Yds/GP	TD	Long
Andrew Marsh	13	45	651	14.5	50.1	4	69
Donaven McCulley	13	39	588	15.1	45.2	3	44
Marlin Klein	11	24	248	10.3	22.5	1	27
Semaj Morgan	11	20	223	11.2	20.3	1	32
Zach Marshall	13	16	199	12.4	15.3	1	37
Channing Goodwin	13	12	148	12.3	11.4	0	39
Jordan Marshall	11	9	92	10.2	8.4	0	25
Hogan Hansen	4	6	74	12.3	18.5	0	26
Deakon Tonielli	13	8	72	9.0	5.5	0	28
Kendrick Bell	13	3	54	18.0	4.2	1	30
Justice Haynes	7	13	50	3.8	7.1	0	16
Max Bredeson	11	2	11	5.5	1.0	0	7
Bryson Kuzdzal	9	4	10	2.5	1.1	0	8
Micah Ka'apana	4	1	8	8.0	2.0	0	8

=== Defensive statistics ===
Player	GP	Solo	Asst	Tot	TFL	Sack	Int	PBU	QBH
Jimmy Rolder	12	47	26	73.0	7.0	2	1	2	2
Ernest Hausmann	10	44	24	68.0	5.5	1	0	1	4
TJ Metcalf	13	37	21	58.0	2.5	0	1	4	0
Brandyn Hillman	12	31	18	49.0	2.5	0	1	3	0
Cole Sullivan	11	28	16	44.0	5.0	2	3	1	0
Jyaire Hill	13	24	12	36.0	3.0	1	1	5	0
Rayshaun Benny	13	19	16	35.0	3.0	1.5	0	2	2
Mason Curtis	11	19	15	34.0	2.0	1.0	1	1	1
Zeke Berry	11	26	7	33.0	0.0	0	1	10	0
Jaishawn Barham	12	21	11	32.0	10.0	4	0	3	5
Jaden Mangham	13	19	11	30.0	2.0	0.0	0	2	0
Derrick Moore	12	19	11	30.0	10.5	10	0	3	3
Trey Pierce	13	18	12	30.0	1.0	0	0	0	2
Troy Bowles	13	16	11	27.0	2.0	1	0	0	1
Jayden Sanders	13	16	7	23.0	0.0	0	0	1	0
Cameron Brandt	13	12	10	22.0	1.5	0.5	0	0	4
Tré Williams	13	12	8	20.0	5.5	0	0	1	0
Dominic Nichols	12	14	5	19.0	5.5	1	0	0	1
TJ Guy	12	13	5	18.0	3.0	2.5	1	0	2
Damon Payne	13	9	7	16.0	2.0	0	0	1	0
Jordan Young	10	11	4	15.0	0.0	0	0	3	0
Enow Etta	13	6	9	15.0	2.5	0.5	0	1	7
Elijah Dotson	12	9	2	11.0	0.0	0	1	0	1
Chase Taylor	10	7	3	10.0	0.0	0	0	0	0

=== Special teams statistics ===
Kickoff returns
Player	Returns	Yds	Yds/Rtrn	TD	Long
Andrew Marsh	16	378	23.6	0	51
Joe Taylor	1	20	20.0	0	20
Zeke Berry	1	11	11.0	0	11
Nate Marshall	1	11	11.0	0	11

Punt returns
Player	Returns	Yds	Yds/Rtrn	TD	Long
Andrew Marsh	4	45	11.3	0	14
Semaj Morgan	13	30	2.3	0	13

Punts
Player	Punts	Yds	Yds/Punt	Long	50+	Inside 20	T'back
Hudson Hollenbeck	40	1,729	43.2	67	11	10	3
Beckham Sunderland	1	35	35.0	35	0	0	0

Field goals
Player	FGs	Att	Long	Blocked
Dominic Zvada	17	25	56	0

== 2026 NFL draft ==
Michigan had six players selected in the 2026 NFL draft. It was the first draft since 2018 that the program did not have a first round selection. Max Bredeson joined his brother Ben Bredeson as the first sibling selection since Ryan, Graham and Jordan Glasgow.

Round	Pick	Player	Position	NFL team
2	44	Derrick Moore	EDGE	Detroit Lions
2	59	Marlin Klein	TE	Houston Texans
3	92	Jaishawn Barham	EDGE	Dallas Cowboys
4	118	Jimmy Rolder	LB	Detroit Lions
5	159	Max Bredeson	FB/TE	Minnesota Vikings
7	250	Rayshaun Benny	DT	Baltimore Ravens
