= Marlin Klein =

German-American football player (born 2002)

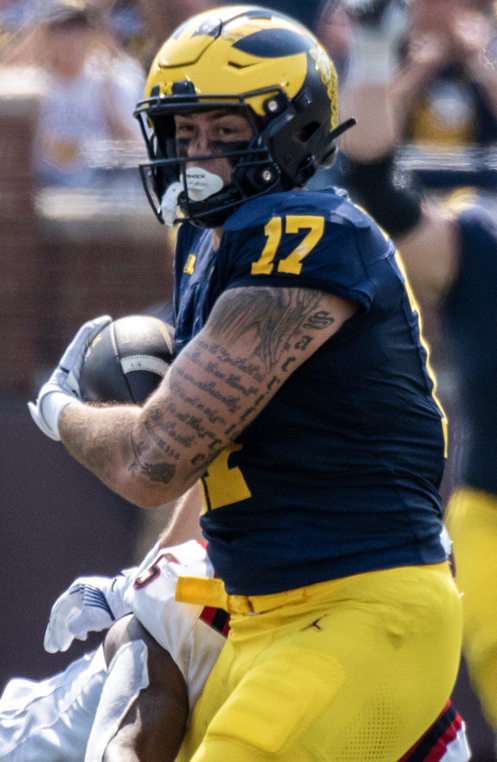
- Klein with the Michigan Wolverines in 2024

No. 83 – Houston Texans
- Position: Tight end
- Roster status: Active

Personal information
- Born: September 17, 2002 (age 24); Germany
- Listed height: 6 ft 6 in (1.98 m)
- Listed weight: 250 lb (113 kg)

Career information
- High school: Rabun Gap-Nacoochee School (Rabun Gap, Georgia, U.S.)
- College: Michigan (2022–2025)
- NFL draft: 2026: 2nd round, 59th overall pick

Career history
- Houston Texans (2026–present)

Awards and highlights
- CFP national champion (2023)

Career NFL statistics as of Week 2, 2026
- Receptions: 1
- Receiving yards: 16
- Stats at Pro Football Reference

Marlin Klein (born September 17, 2002) is a German professional American football tight end for the Houston Texans of the National Football League (NFL). He played college football for the Michigan Wolverines, winning a national championship in 2023. Klein was selected by the Texans in the second round of the 2026 NFL draft.

== Early life ==
Klein was born in Germany on September 17, 2002, the son of Marco Albers and Melanie Klein. He grew up in Cologne, initially playing soccer and basketball as a youth before turning to American football. He played for the junior team of the Cologne Crocodiles. With the help of Gridiron Imports Foundation, a US Registered Non-profit that helps international football players play in the United States, Klein later transferred to Rabun Gap-Nacoochee School, a boarding school in Rabun Gap, Georgia, to play high school football in the United States. He was rated as a three-star recruit and committed to play college football at the University of Michigan.

== College career ==
In 2022, Klein enrolled at the University of Michigan and played in two games as a freshman before redshirting the season. In 2023, he played in ten games, winning the national championship with Michigan that season. He also made his first collegiate reception, finishing the year with one catch for eight yards.

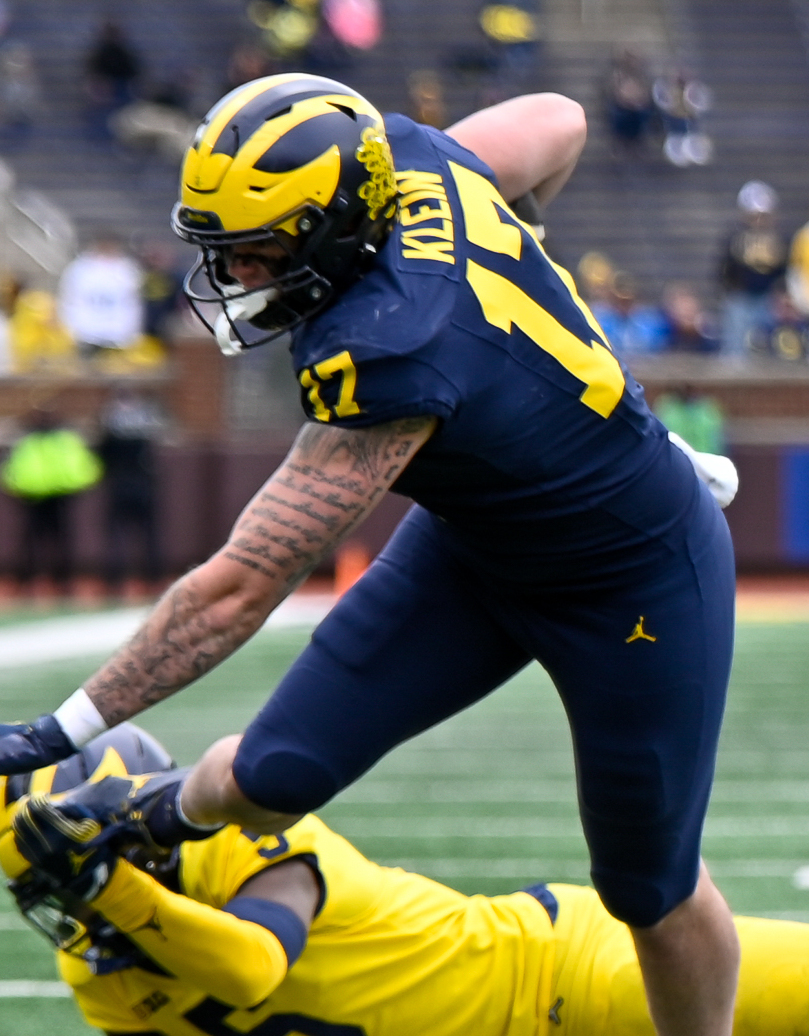
Klein in the Michigan Wolverines 2024 spring game

In 2024, Klein moved into a larger role. In week three versus Arkansas State, he was Michigan’s leading receiver with three receptions for 43 yards. Klein played in all 13 games for the Wolverines, starting six times. He totaled 13 receptions for 108 yards and was a key contributor in the running game as a blocker.

In 2025, Klein opened the season as the No. 1 tight end, and in the first game against New Mexico had a career-high and team-high six receptions for 93 yards and a touchdown.

=== Statistics ===
Year	Team	GP	Receiving			
Year	Team	GP	Rec	Yds	Avg	TD
2022	Michigan	2	0	0	–	0
2023	Michigan	10	1	8	8.0	0
2024	Michigan	13	13	108	8.3	0
2025	Michigan	11	24	248	10.3	1
Career		36	38	364	9.6	1

== Professional career ==
Pre-draft measurables
Height	Weight	Arm length	Hand span	Wingspan	40-yard dash	10-yard split	20-yard split	Three-cone drill	Vertical jump	Broad jump
6 ft 6 in (1.98 m)	248 lb (112 kg)	32 3/8 in (0.82 m)	9 1/4 in (0.23 m)	6 ft 8 1/8 in (2.04 m)	4.61 s	1.64 s	2.69 s	7.42 s	36.0 in (0.91 m)	9 ft 9 in (2.97 m)
All values from NFL Combine

Klein was selected by the Houston Texans in the second round with the 59th overall pick in the 2026 NFL draft. Klein was the highest drafted German player since Björn Werner was drafted in the first round, 24th overall by the Indianapolis Colts in the 2013 NFL draft.
