= Andrew Marsh (American football) =

American football player (born 2007)

No. 3 – Michigan Wolverines
- Position: Wide receiver
- Class: Sophomore

Personal information
- Born: February 2, 2007 (age 19); Fulshear, Texas, U.S.
- Listed height: 6 ft 1 in (1.85 m)
- Listed weight: 192 lb (87 kg)

Career information
- High school: Jordan (Fulshear, Texas)
- College: Michigan (2025–present)

Awards and highlights
- Freshman All-American (2025)
- Stats at ESPN

Andrew Marsh (born February 2, 2007) is an American college football wide receiver for the Michigan Wolverines.

== Early life ==
Marsh was born on February 2, 2007, the son of Eleanor and Timothy Marsh. Timothy died of cancer when Andrew was seven years old. He attended Jordan High School in Fulshear, Texas where he played football and was a track and field athlete. He was named the Texas District 19-6A Newcomer of the Year in 2022 and the District 19-6A Offensive Player of the Year in 2024. During his junior year, he recorded 65 receptions for a school-record 1,158 yards and 15 touchdowns in 2023. He finished his high school career with over 3,500 receiving yards and 36 touchdowns. He was rated a four-star prospect by ESPN, the No. 67 overall player in the country, the No. 10 wide receiver nationally and the No. 13 player in the state of Texas.

== College career ==
On August 20, 2024, Marsh committed to play college football at the University of Michigan. He helped recruit Bryce Underwood, the No. 1 overall player in the 2025 college football recruiting class, to Michigan. Marsh began his freshman season for the 2025 Wolverines as the team's starting kick returner. On August 30, 2025, in his collegiate debut against New Mexico, he returned three kickoffs for 69 yards, while also playing snaps at wide receiver. On September 13, in a game against Central Michigan, he recorded his first career touchdown on a 23-yard run. Marsh made his first collegiate start at wide receiver on October 4 against Wisconsin, recording four receptions for 80 yards. On October 11 against USC, he had eight receptions for 138 yards, including a 69-yard touchdown reception from Underwood.

On November 15, against Northwestern at Wrigley Field, Marsh recorded career-highs with 12 receptions for 189 yards; each program records for a freshman. He eclipsed 100 receiving yards for the second time this season, and became the first Michigan freshman wide receiver to record multiple 100-yard performances since Roy Roundtree in 2009. His 189 yards is tied for the sixth-most receiving yards in a game in program history, and the most since Jehu Chesson recorded 207 yards in 2015. His 12 receptions is tied for the fifth-most in program history and the most since Braylon Edwards in 2004. He was subsequently named the Big Ten Conference Freshman of the Week. In the 2025 Citrus Bowl against Texas, he recorded his fourth touchdown reception of the season. He also returned four kickoffs for 143 total yards and helped Michigan start two third-quarter possessions near midfield. He finished the season ranked first all-time among freshmen wide receivers in yards (651), second in receptions (45) and third in touchdown receptions (4). Marsh earned Freshman All-American honors following the 2025 season.
