= Oakdale High School (Maryland) =

Public school in Maryland, United States

Location
- 5850 Eaglehead Drive; New Market, Maryland 21754; United States; 39°23′42″N 77°18′36″W

Information
- Type: Public high school
- Established: 2010; 16 years ago
- School district: Frederick County Public Schools
- NCES School ID: 240033001688
- Principal: Bill Caulfield
- Teaching staff: 87.50 (on an FTE basis) (2024-25)
- Grades: 9-12
- Enrollment: 1702 (2024-25)
- Student to teacher ratio: 19.45
- Colors: Black, silver, white
- Mascot: Bears ("Oakie")
- USNWR ranking: 2519 (2026)
- Website: education.fcps.org/ohs/

Oakdale High School is a public high school located in New Market, Maryland, United States, near the city of Frederick. It is part of the Frederick County Public Schools system.

== History ==
The school's building was built in 2008 to temporarily hold Linganore High School while Linganore's original building was being renovated. In 2010, the school opened as Oakdale High School with only ninth and tenth grade. In the 2011–2012 school year, an eleventh grade was added, and finally, the next year, Oakdale had in its attendance all four grades. The first senior class from Oakdale graduated in June 2013.

On August 18, 2022, a bomb threat was made against the school by a student, leading to an investigation by the Frederick County Sheriff's Office, which found the threats not credible. The student was charged with threats of mass violence and disruption of school activities.

=== Blue Ribbon Schools Program ===
In 2023, Oakdale High School was recognized as a National Blue Ribbon school by the U.S. Department of Education.

== Athletics championships ==
Sport	Championships Won
Football	2A State Champions - 2018
Football	3A State Champions - 2023
Basketball	3A State Champions - 2022
Ice Hockey	MSHL Champions - 2024
Ice Hockey	MSHL Champions - 2025
Ice Hockey	MSHL Champions - 2026
Girls Soccer	1A State Champions - 2010
Boys Soccer	2A State Champions - 2014
Boys Soccer	3A State Champions - 2015
Boys Soccer	2A State Champions - 2018
Boys Track	2A State Champions - 2018
Boys Track	2A State Champions - 2015
Girls Track	2A State Champions - 2013
Girls Track	2A State Champions - 2014
Girls Track	2A State Champions - 2015
Boys Indoor Track	2A State Champions - 2015
Girls Indoor Track	2A State Champions - 2015
Volleyball	2A State Champions - 2014
Volleyball	2A State Champions - 2017
Marching Band	4A State Champions - 2023

== Notable alumni ==
- Cameron Dorner, NFL wide receiver
- Dominic Nichols, college football player
- Collin Schlee, college football player
- Zach Thomas, basketball player
