= TJ Metcalf =

American football player (born 2005)

No. 1 – Tennessee Volunteers
- Position: Defensive back
- Class: Senior

Personal information
- Born: May 6, 2005 (age 21); Oxford, Mississippi, U.S.
- Listed height: 6 ft 1 in (1.85 m)
- Listed weight: 205 lb (93 kg)

Career information
- High school: Pinson Valley (Pinson, Alabama)
- College: Arkansas (2023–2024); Michigan (2025); Tennessee (2026–present)
- Stats at ESPN

Tarrus "TJ" Metcalf Jr. (born May 6, 2005) is an American college football defensive back for the Tennessee Volunteers. He previously played for the Arkansas Razorbacks and Michigan Wolverines.

== Early life ==
TJ was born on May 6, 2005, the son of Tarrus Metcalf Sr. and Neely Lott Metcalf, in Oxford, Mississippi. He attended Pinson Valley High School in Pinson, Alabama, where he played football under former NFL safety and head coach Sam Shade. In addition to playing football, Metcalf played basketball as a point guard and competed in track and field in long jump and as a sprinter. He was rated as a four-star recruit by Rivals and committed to play college football for the Arkansas Razorbacks. Metcalf caught the game-clinching interception for Alabama in the 2022 Alabama v. Mississippi high school all-star game.

== College career ==
=== Arkansas ===
As a freshman in 2023, Metcalf played all 12 games for Arkansas, recording 15 tackles and a fumble recovery. In week two of the 2024 season, he tallied 12 tackles versus Oklahoma State. In week three, Metcalf had an interception to help the Razorbacks clinch a 37-27 win over UAB. In week four, he recorded four tackles, two pass deflections, two interceptions, and a forced fumble which prevented a touchdown, as he led the Razorbacks to a 24-14 win over Auburn. For his performance, Metcalf was named the SEC defensive player of the week. Metcalf became the first Razorback with at least two interceptions and a forced fumble in a game since safety Kenoy Kennedy against South Carolina in 1999. On December 9, 2024, Metcalf announced that he would enter the NCAA transfer portal.

=== Michigan ===
On December 16, 2024, Metcalf transferred to the University of Michigan with his younger brother, Tevis. In week two against Oklahoma, TJ logged his first interception as a Wolverine and made four tackles. He finished the season earning an honorable mention on the 2025 All-Big Ten team by the coaches.

=== Tennessee ===
In 2026, Metcalf transferred to the University of Tennessee for his senior year.

Through Tennessee’s November 14, 2026, game against Texas A&M, Metcalf had recorded 61 tackles, two interceptions, and half a sack in nine games. He recorded eight tackles and his first career half-sack against Kentucky.

== Personal life ==
Metcalf is the cousin of current Pittsburgh Steelers wide receiver, DK Metcalf, and the nephew of DK’s father, former Chicago Bears offensive lineman Terrence Metcalf. His younger brother, Tevis, also plays college football, recruited to play for Arkansas, Michigan and Tennessee.

In August 2026, Metcalf and his brother Tevis hosted a back-to-school giveaway at Pinson Valley High School in Pinson, Alabama.
