= Elijah Dotson (safety) =

American football player (born 2006)

No. 22 – Missouri Tigers
- Position: Defensive back
- Class: Sophomore

Personal information
- Born: November 8, 2006 (age 19)
- Listed height: 6 ft 1 in (1.85 m)
- Listed weight: 192 lb (87 kg)

Career information
- High school: Belleville (Belleville, Michigan)
- College: Michigan (2025); Missouri (2026–present)

Elijah Dotson (born November 8, 2006) is an American college football defensive back for the Missouri Tigers. He played for the Michigan Wolverines in 2025.

== Early life ==
Dotson was born on November 8, 2006, the son of Charles and Donna Dotson. He attended the University of Detroit Jesuit High School and Academy for his first three years, where he played football as a safety and wide receiver. Dotson was an MHSFCA Division 2 first-team All-State selection at wide receiver as a junior. For his senior year, he transferred to Belleville High School and was a teammate of quarterback Bryce Underwood. Dotson was rated as a consensus four-star recruit and a top 200 player overall nationally in the class of 2025. He held offers from schools such as Auburn, Iowa, Michigan, Michigan State, Penn State, Pittsburgh, Tennessee and Wisconsin. Dotson initially committed to play college football for the Pittsburgh Panthers. On November 20, 2024, he flipped his commitment to the Michigan Wolverines, staying in-state. Following his senior season, he was named to the Michigan Associated Press Division 1-2 All-State Team, earning honors as a wide receiver. Sports Illustrated selected Dotson as a first-team All-State safety and a second team All-State wide receiver.

== College career ==
On December 4, 2024, Dotson officially signed his national letter of intent on the early National Signing Day to play college football at the University of Michigan.
