= Jimmy Rolder =

American football player (born 2004)

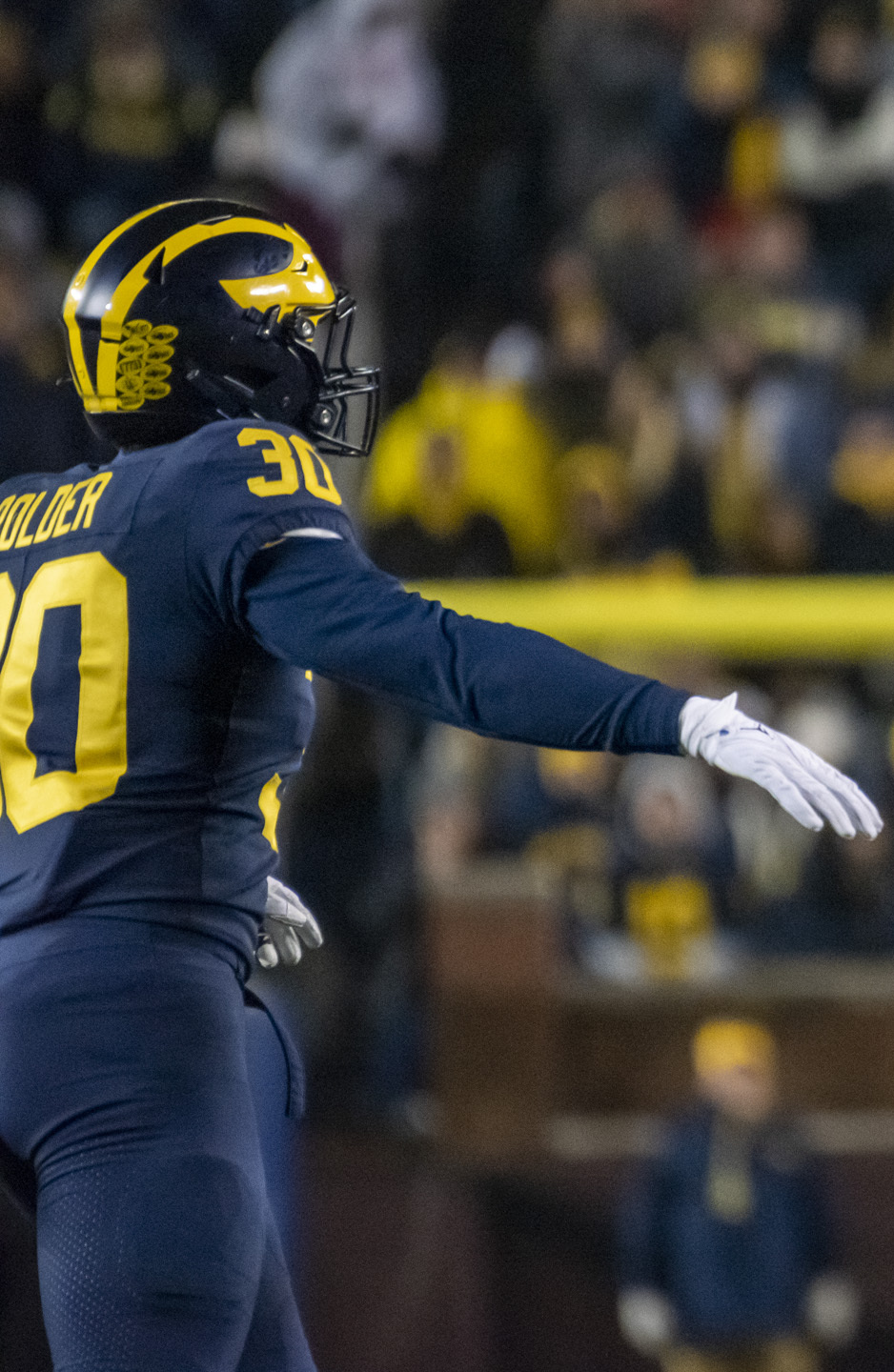
- Rolder with the Michigan Wolverines in 2022

No. 41 – Detroit Lions
- Position: Linebacker
- Roster status: Injured reserve

Personal information
- Born: February 9, 2004 (age 22); Orland Park, Illinois, U.S.
- Listed height: 6 ft 2 in (1.88 m)
- Listed weight: 238 lb (108 kg)

Career information
- High school: Marist High School (Chicago, Illinois)
- College: Michigan (2022–2025)
- NFL draft: 2026: 4th round, 118th overall pick

Career history
- Detroit Lions (2026–present)

Awards and highlights
- CFP national champion (2023); Second-team All-Big Ten (2025)

Career NFL statistics as of Week 8, 2026
- Total tackles: 11
- Sacks: 1
- Stats at Pro Football Reference

James Rolder (born February 9, 2004) is an American professional football linebacker for the Detroit Lions of the National Football League (NFL). He played college football for the Michigan Wolverines, winning a national championship in 2023 and earning All-Big Ten honors in 2025. Rolder was selected by the Lions in the fourth round of the 2026 NFL draft.

== Early life ==
Rolder attended Marist High School located in Chicago, Illinois. Coming out of high school, he was rated as a four-star recruit and the 364th overall player in the class of 2022, where he committed to play college football for the Michigan Wolverines over offers from other schools such as Florida, Cincinnati, Iowa, LSU, Ohio State, and Wisconsin.

== College career ==
As a freshman in 2022, Rolder played in 13 games and totaled 14 tackles. In 2023, he was limited to six games due to injuries. In 2024, Rolder finished the season notching 26 tackles, with 1.5 for a loss. Rolder earned a starting linebacker position to start the 2025 season for the Wolverines. In week one of the season, he recorded four tackles, one being for a loss in a win against New Mexico. In week nine, he recorded 10 tackles, two for a loss, including a sack, and a fumble recovery in a fourth consecutive win in the rivalry against the Michigan State Spartans. Rolder earned Big Ten Defensive Player of the Week honors following the game. Later, in week 14 against rival Ohio State Buckeyes, Rolder notched 12 tackles; a personal single-game best. In 2025, Rolder led the Wolverines with 73 total tackles, two sacks, and an interception, earning second-team All-Big Ten honors.

== Professional career ==
Pre-draft measurables
Height	Weight	Arm length	Hand span	Wingspan	20-yard shuttle	Three-cone drill	Vertical jump	Broad jump
6 ft 2 1/2 in (1.89 m)	238 lb (108 kg)	30 1/2 in (0.77 m)	9 3/4 in (0.25 m)	6 ft 5 3/8 in (1.97 m)	4.26 s	7.00 s	36.0 in (0.91 m)	9 ft 11 in (3.02 m)
All values from NFL Combine

Rolder was selected by the Detroit Lions in the fourth round with the 118th overall pick of the 2026 NFL draft.
