= Giovanni El-Hadi =

American football player (born 2003)

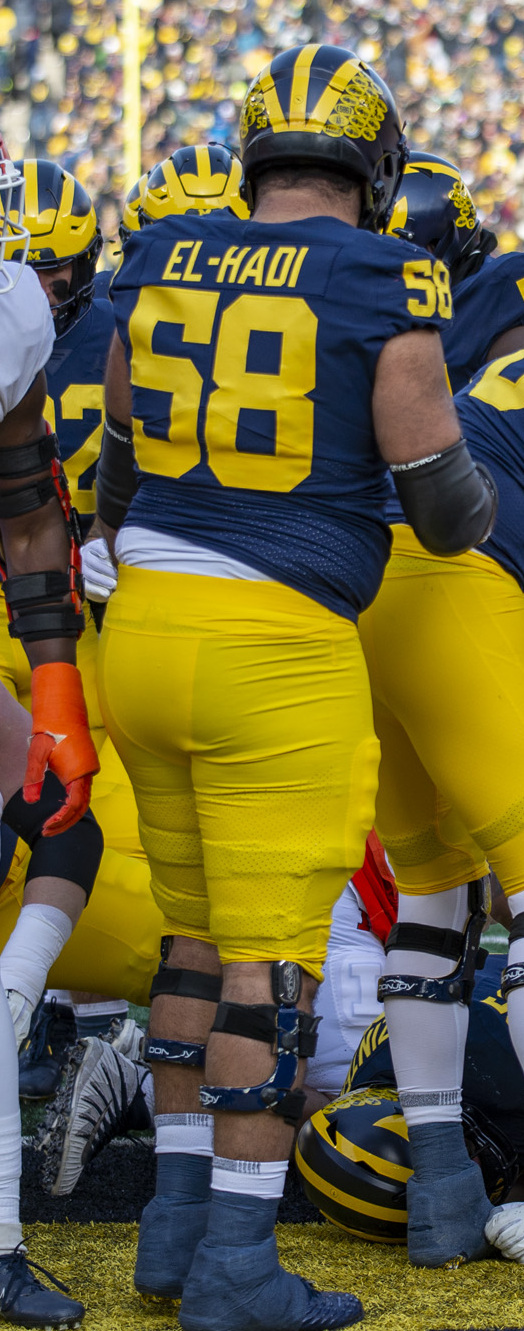
- El-Hadi with the Michigan Wolverines in 2022

No. 58
- Position: Offensive guard

Personal information
- Born: August 3, 2003 (age 23)
- Listed height: 6 ft 4 in (1.93 m)
- Listed weight: 326 lb (148 kg)

Career information
- High school: Adlai E. Stevenson (Sterling Heights, Michigan)
- College: Michigan (2021–2025)

Awards and highlights
- CFP national champion (2023); Third-team All-Big Ten (2025)
- Stats at ESPN

Giovanni El-Hadi (born August 3, 2003) is an American football offensive guard. He played college football for the Michigan Wolverines, winning three consecutive Big Ten Conference titles and a national championship in 2023.

== Early life ==
El-Hadi attended Adlai E. Stevenson High School in Sterling Heights, Michigan. He was rated as a four-star recruit and the 76th overall recruit in the class of 2021, committing to play college football for the Michigan Wolverines over offers from other schools such as Central Michigan, Indiana, Iowa State, Penn State, Purdue, and Western Michigan.

== College career ==
As a freshman in 2021, El-Hadi took a redshirt. In 2022, he played in 14 games with three starts, as he helped the offensive line win the Joe Moore Award. In 2023, El-Hadi appeared in 15 games as a reserve as he helped Michigan to National Championship win. El-Hadi entered the 2024 season as the team's starting right guard. He started all 13 games at guard for the Wolverines. In 2025, El-Hadi was a third-team All-Big Ten selection in 2025.

== Professional career ==
Pre-draft measurables
Height	Weight	Arm length	Hand span	Wingspan
6 ft 3 7/8 in (1.93 m)	326 lb (148 kg)	32 1/4 in (0.82 m)	10 1/2 in (0.27 m)	6 ft 8 1/2 in (2.04 m)
All values from Pro Day
