= Nate Marshall =

American football player (born 2007)

No. 94 – Michigan Wolverines
- Position: Defensive end
- Class: Sophomore

Personal information
- Born: January 1, 2007 (age 19)
- Listed height: 6 ft 3 in (1.91 m)
- Listed weight: 248 lb (112 kg)

Career information
- High school: Fenwick (Oak Park, Illinois)
- College: Michigan (2025–present)
- Stats at ESPN

Nathaniel Marshall (born January 1, 2007) is an American college football defensive end for the Michigan Wolverines.

== Early life ==
Marshall attended Fenwick High School in Oak Park, Illinois. He was named the Chicago Catholic League Tony Lawless Player of the Year his senior year in 2024 and the Chicago Catholic League Defensive Player of the Year his sophomore and junior years. A five-star recruit by Rivals.com, Marshall was selected to play in the 2025 Navy All-American Bowl. He originally committed to play college football at the University of Michigan before flipping his commitment to the University of Auburn. On national signing day, Marshall ultimately flipped back to Michigan and head coach, Sherrone Moore.

== College career ==
Marshall earned playing time his freshman year at Michigan in 2025. Overall he played in 11 games and had six tackles playing mostly special teams. He returned to Michigan for his sophomore year in 2026 under new head coach, Kyle Whittingham. On November 10, 2026, Marshall was suspended indefinitely from the team with three games remaining. He was previously reprimanded for skipping classes in the spring of that year. Marshall finished the season with eleven tackles and two sacks.
