= Andrew Babalola (American football) =

American football player (born 2006)

No. 65 – Michigan Wolverines
- Position: Offensive tackle
- Class: Sophomore

Personal information
- Born: October 2, 2006 (age 20); West Bloomfield, Michigan, U.S.
- Listed height: 6 ft 6 in (1.98 m)
- Listed weight: 305 lb (138 kg)

Career information
- High school: Blue Valley Northwest (Overland Park, Kansas)
- College: Michigan (2025–present)

Andrew Babalola (born October 2, 2006) is an American college football offensive tackle for the Michigan Wolverines. He was a five-star recruit in the 2025 college football recruiting class.

== Early life ==
Babalola was born on October 2, 2006, in West Bloomfield, Michigan, the son of Ebenezer and Grace Babalola. He grew up in Kansas and played football and basketball at Blue Valley Northwest High School in Overland Park. He began playing basketball at a young age and was an All-State honorable mention as a senior. Babalola first started playing football as a junior in high school and started at offensive tackle in his first season. By his senior year he was a five-star recruit and one of the most highly sought after players in the 2025 college football recruiting class, receiving offers from over 35 schools, including Michigan, Oklahoma, Stanford, Georgia, Auburn and Alabama. Babalola was ranked by 247Sports, ESPN, Rivals, and On3.com as the unanimous No. 1 recruit in Kansas, and the No. 14 overall player nationally by 247Sports and No. 15 by On3.com. He gave his verbal commitment to Michigan in October 2024, and signed his national letter of intent on the early National Signing Day in December 2024.

== College career ==
Babalola enrolled early at the University of Michigan in December 2024, playing under head coach Sherrone Moore. He first began practicing with the 2024 Michigan Wolverines in preparation for the ReliaQuest Bowl (but was ineligible to play in the game). In late August 2025, Babalola suffered a torn ACL and missed his entire freshman season. In August 2026, he resumed football activities and returned to practice, where he was expected to compete for a starting role as a sophomore. Unfortunately, Babalola suffered a setback that same month and was unable to make his collegiate debut in 2026.
