= Jadyn Davis =

American football player (born 2005)

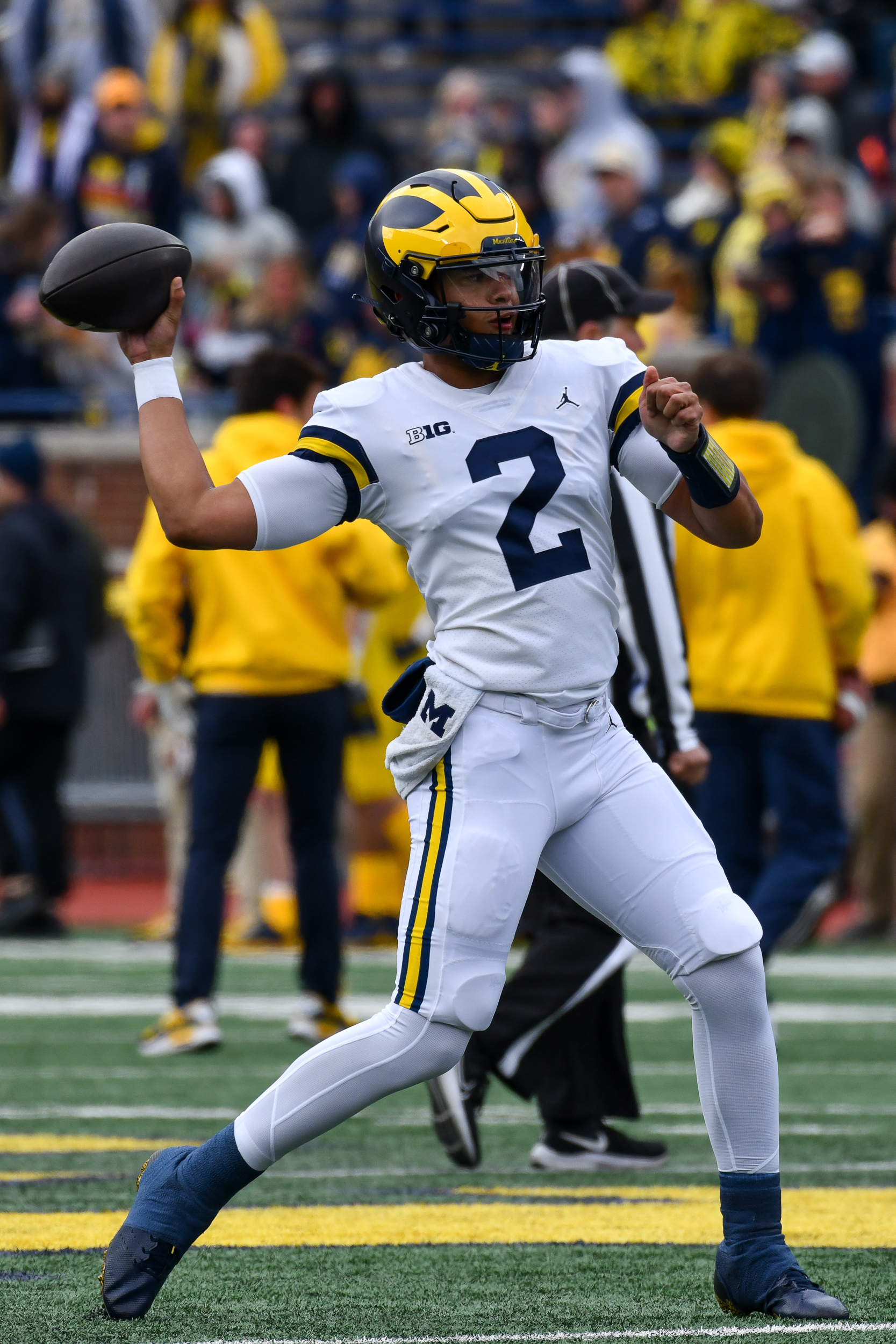
- Davis with the Michigan Wolverines in 2024

No. 1 – East Tennessee State Buccaneers
- Position: Quarterback
- Class: Redshirt Sophomore

Personal information
- Born: August 22, 2005 (age 21)
- Listed height: 6 ft 1 in (1.85 m)
- Listed weight: 205 lb (93 kg)

Career information
- High school: Providence Day School (Charlotte, North Carolina)
- College: Michigan (2024–2025); East Tennessee State (2026–present)

Awards and highlights
- North Carolina Mr. Football (2022, 2023)
- Stats at ESPN

Jadyn Davis (born August 22, 2005) is an American college football quarterback for the East Tennessee State Buccaneers. He previously played for the Michigan Wolverines.

== Early life ==
Davis was born on August 22, 2005, the son of Jeremiah and Brandi Davis. He originally attended Providence Day School in Charlotte, North Carolina before transferring to Catawba Ridge High School in Fort Mill, South Carolina for two years before transferring back to Providence Day. As a junior in 2022, he passed 3,425 yards with 43 touchdowns and was named the North Carolina Gatorade Football Player of the Year and the North Carolina Mr. Football. As a senior, he passed for 3,370 yards with 43 touchdowns and was named North Carolina Mr. Football for a second consecutive year.

On March 31, 2023, Davis committed to play college football at the University of Michigan. He was a four-star recruit, ranked as the nation's fifth best high school quarterback and the 59th overall player. Davis was selected to play in the 2024 All-American Bowl before enrolling at Michigan.

== College career ==
In December 2023, Davis enrolled early at the University of Michigan, and first participated in practices leading up to the 2024 Rose Bowl and the national championship game (and was in attendance on the sideline as they won). As a true freshman in the spring of 2024, he competed with Alex Orji and Davis Warren, and was their back-up to start the 2024 season. In game eleven versus Northwestern, Davis made his collegiate debut. On his first and only play of the game, he handed the ball off to Tavierre Dunlap for a 20-yard touchdown in the fourth quarter.

In the 2025 season he backed up Bryce Underwood and played in 3 games, throwing 0 touchdowns and 1 interception.

On December 16, 2025, Davis announced that he'd be entering the NCAA transfer portal.
