= Brandyn Hillman =

American football player (born 2005)

No. 6 – Virginia Cavaliers
- Position: Safety
- Class: Senior

Personal information
- Born: June 13, 2005 (age 21)
- Listed height: 6 ft 0 in (1.83 m)
- Listed weight: 190 lb (86 kg)

Career information
- High school: Churchland (Portsmouth, Virginia)
- College: Michigan (2023–2025); Virginia (2026–present)
- Stats at ESPN

Brandyn Hillman (born June 13, 2005) is an American football safety for the Virginia Cavaliers. He previously played for the Michigan Wolverines.

== Early life ==
Hillman attended Churchland High School in Portsmouth, Virginia, and initially signed to play college football for the Notre Dame Fighting Irish over offers from other schools such as Norfolk State, North Carolina, USC, Virginia Tech, and Kentucky. Hillman was unable to get the final clear through undergraduate admissions at Notre Dame and requested his release from his national letter of intent. He then went on to sign and play for the Michigan Wolverines.

== College career ==
=== Michigan ===
As a freshman in 2023, Hillman played in nine games. In 2024, he totaled 21 tackles in 12 games. Hillman entered the 2025 season as a starter in the Wolverines secondary. In week 9 of the 2025 season, he recorded five tackles, a pass deflection, and a forced fumble in a win over Michigan State. During the 2025 season, Hillman recorded 49 tackles, three pass deflections, an interception, and a forced fumble, earning all-Big Ten honorable mention. After the season, he entered the NCAA transfer portal.

=== Virginia ===
Hillman transferred to play for the Virginia Cavaliers.
