= Jyaire Hill =

American football player (born 2005)

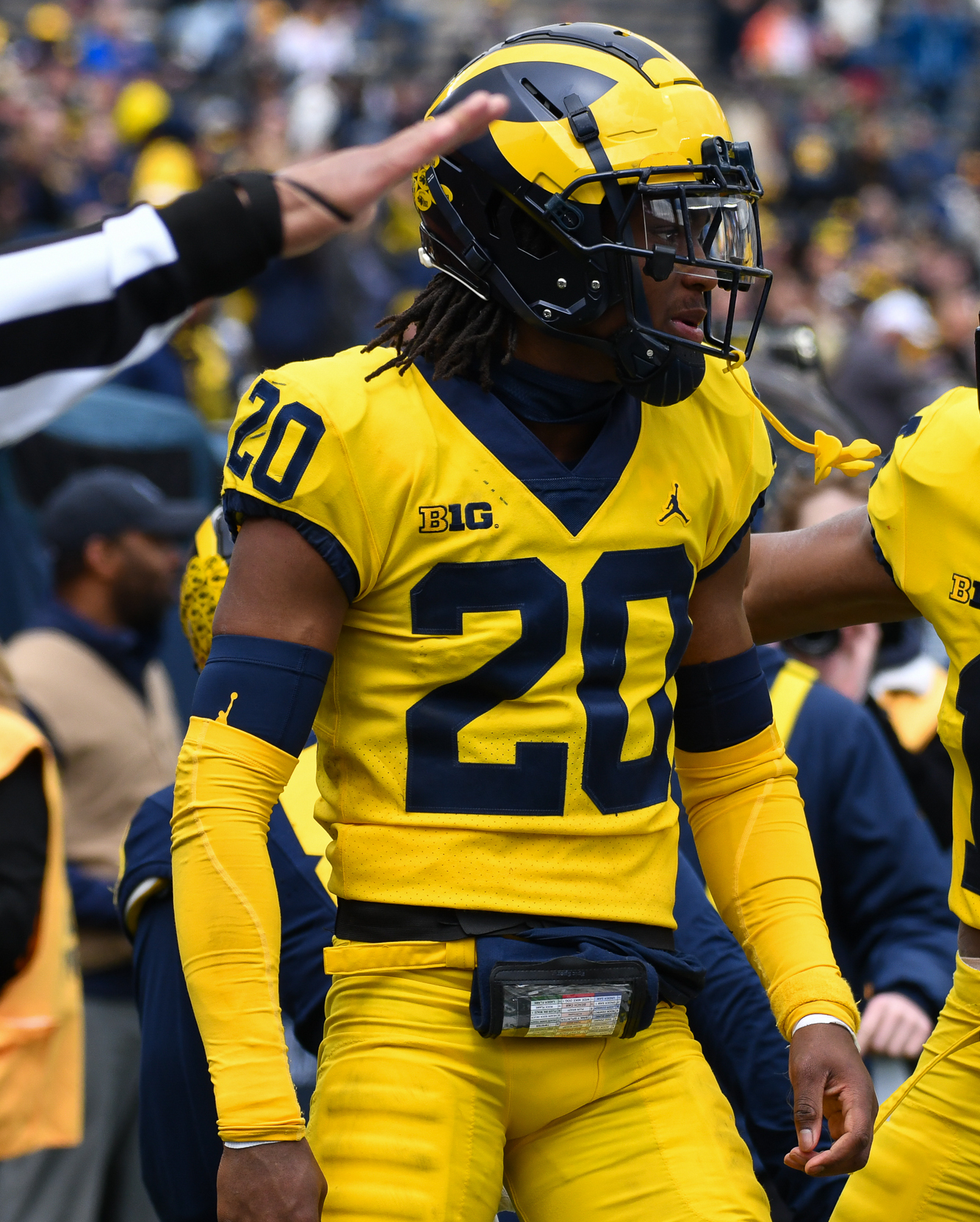
- Hill with the Michigan Wolverines in 2024

No. 0 – Michigan Wolverines
- Position: Cornerback
- Class: Senior

Personal information
- Born: August 31, 2005 (age 21)
- Listed height: 6 ft 2 in (1.88 m)
- Listed weight: 190 lb (86 kg)

Career information
- High school: Kankakee (Kankakee, Illinois)
- College: Michigan (2023–present)

Awards and highlights
- CFP national champion (2023)
- Stats at ESPN

Jyaire Hill (born August 31, 2005) is an American college football cornerback for the Michigan Wolverines. He won a national championship in 2023.

== Early life ==
HIll was born on August 31, 2005, the son of Joeron Sr. and Kanesha Hill, and attended Kankakee High School in Kankakee, Illinois. He was rated as a four-star recruit and the 195th overall player in the class of 2023, ultimately committing to play college football for the Michigan Wolverines over offers such as Florida, Illinois, Kentucky, Missouri and Purdue.

== College career ==
Hill enrolled at the University of Michigan as a freshman in 2023. He appeared in four games in Michigan's national championship season before taking a redshirt, recording eight tackles with one and a half being for a loss.

Before the 2024 season, Hill competed for one of the Wolverines starting spots in the secondary with transfer cornerbacks Ricky Johnson and Aamir Hall. Hill won the competition and earned his first collegiate start week one versus Fresno State. In week 5 against Minnesota, he had two tackles, both for a loss, and his first collegiate interception. In week 6 versus Washington, Hill recorded seven tackles, including his first career sack. In total, Hill played in 12 games, starting 11 times as the outside cornerback. He finished the season with 35 tackles, six tackles for a loss, one sack, eight passes defended and one interception.

As a junior in 2025, Hill started all 13 games and earned honorable mention All-Big Ten. He recorded 36 tackles, one sack and had his only interception of the season against Ohio State. As a senior in 2026, Hill earned the Jim Thorpe Award National Defensive Back of the Week following his game-determining late interception off of John Mateer in the week-two win against No. 11 Oklahoma.
