= Zack Marshall =

American football player (born 2005)

No. 83 – Michigan Wolverines
- Position: Tight end
- Class: Senior

Personal information
- Born: July 9, 2005 (age 21)
- Listed height: 6 ft 5 in (1.96 m)
- Listed weight: 245 lb (111 kg)

Career information
- High school: Carlsbad (Carlsbad, California)
- College: Michigan (2023–present)

Awards and highlights
- CFP national champion (2023)
- Stats at ESPN

Zack Marshall (born July 9, 2005) is an American football tight end for the Michigan Wolverines.

== Early life ==
Marshall attended Carlsbad High School in Carlsbad, California. He was rated as a three-star recruit and the 67th overall player in the state of California, and received offers from schools such as Arizona, Boise State, California, Michigan, Utah, and Washington State. Marshall committed to play college football for the Michigan Wolverines.

== College career ==
In his first two seasons in 2023 and 2024, Marshall played a combined 15 games, primarily on special teams, recording one tackle. In week 2 of the 2025 season, he recorded one reception for 12 yards in a loss to Oklahoma. In week 8, Marshall hauled in five passes for 72 yards and a touchdown in a victory over Washington. He finished the 2025 season with 16 catches for 199 yards and a touchdown. In October 2026, screenshots of his private group text messages were leaked on social media, which showed him criticizing his offensive coordinator, Jason Beck. After which Marshall issued a public apology.
