= Jaishawn Barham =

American football linebacker (born 2004)

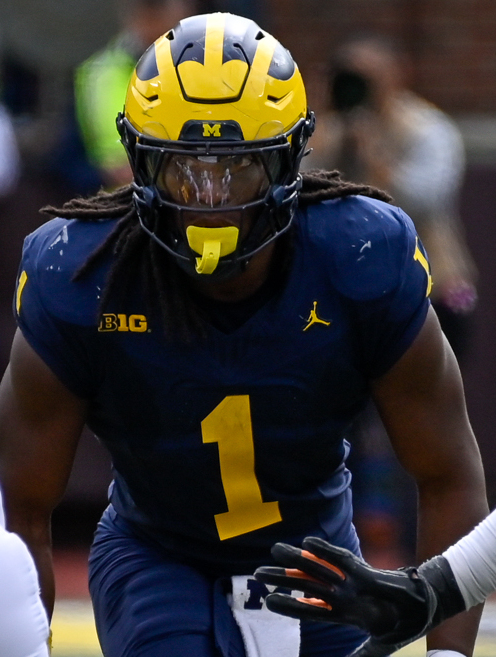
- Barham with the Michigan Wolverines in 2024

No. 55 – Dallas Cowboys
- Position: Linebacker
- Roster status: Active

Personal information
- Born: February 2, 2004 (age 22)
- Listed height: 6 ft 3 in (1.91 m)
- Listed weight: 240 lb (109 kg)

Career information
- High school: Saint Frances Academy (Baltimore, Maryland)
- College: Maryland (2022–2023); Michigan (2024–2025)
- NFL draft: 2026: 3rd round, 92nd overall pick

Career history
- Dallas Cowboys (2026–present)

Awards and highlights
- Freshman All-American (2022)

Career NFL statistics as of Week 7, 2026
- Tackles: 34
- Forced fumbles: 1
- Stats at Pro Football Reference

Jaishawn Barham (born February 2, 2004) is an American professional football linebacker for the Dallas Cowboys of the National Football League (NFL). He played college football for the Maryland Terrapins and Michigan Wolverines. Barham was selected by the Cowboys in the third round of the 2026 NFL draft.

== Early life ==
Barham was born on February 2, 2004, the son of Anthony Barham and Chrishawn Nelson, and grew up in District Heights, Maryland. He first attended high school at DeMatha Catholic High School in Hyattsville, Maryland, before transferring to Saint Frances Academy in Baltimore for his junior and senior year, and was a football teammate of Derrick Moore. Barham was rated as a four-star recruit, the 108th overall prospect and the eighth-best linebacker in the class of 2021. He held offers from Penn State, South Carolina, Maryland, Oklahoma, Arizona State, Arkansas, Baylor, Florida, Florida State, Notre Dame and Texas A&M. Barham initially committed to play for the South Carolina Gamecocks, but ultimately decided to flip his commitment to play for his home state Maryland Terrapins.

== College career ==
=== Maryland ===
Barham enrolled at the University of Maryland, College Park in 2022. He became an immediate starter as a true freshman, starting all 12 games for Maryland. In week 6 of the 2022 season, Barham notched five tackles, two sacks, and a forced fumble against Purdue, and was named the Big Ten Co-Freshman of the week. He finished the season with 59 tackles, 6.5 tackles for a loss, 4 sacks, a pass deflection, and a forced fumble. For his performance, Barham was named honorable mention All-Big Ten Conference, and named a Freshman All-American by College Football News.

In 2023, Barham started 11 games for Maryland. On November 18, 2023, Barham recorded seven tackles and his first career interception against his future team, the Michigan Wolverines. Barham finished his sophomore season notching 37 tackles, 3 tackles for a loss, 3 sacks, a pass deflection and an interception. Following his sophomore season, Barham was named honorable mention All-Big Ten for a second consecutive season. After the conclusion of the 2023 season, Barham entered the NCAA transfer portal.

=== Michigan ===
Barham transferred to the University of Michigan in December 2023. Entering his junior season, he was ranked as a top five linebacker in college football by members of the media. Barham started in all 13 games for the Wolverines in 2024 and finished second on the team with 66 tackles, including four tackles for a loss and a sack. In 2025, Barham switched to an edge rusher as a senior. He started in 12 games and finished the season with 32 tackles, ten for as loss, including four sacks.

== Professional career ==
Pre-draft measurables
Height	Weight	Arm length	Hand span	Wingspan	40-yard dash	10-yard split	20-yard split	Vertical jump	Broad jump
6 ft 3 1/2 in (1.92 m)	240 lb (109 kg)	32 3/8 in (0.82 m)	10 1/4 in (0.26 m)	6 ft 8 1/8 in (2.04 m)	4.64 s	1.61 s	2.66 s	33.0 in (0.84 m)	10 ft 3 in (3.12 m)
All values from NFL Combine

Barham was selected by the Dallas Cowboys in the third round, 92nd overall, of the 2026 NFL draft. The selection was received from the San Francisco 49ers in exchange for Osa Odighizuwa.
