= Dominic Nichols =

American football player (born 2006)

No. 8 – Michigan Wolverines
- Position: Defensive end
- Class: Junior

Personal information
- Born: February 6, 2006 (age 20)
- Listed height: 6 ft 5 in (1.96 m)
- Listed weight: 245 lb (111 kg)

Career information
- High school: Oakdale (Frederick, Maryland)
- College: Michigan (2024–present)
- Stats at ESPN

Dominic Nichols (born February 6, 2006) is an American football defensive end for the Michigan Wolverines.

== Early life ==
Nichols attended Oakdale High School in Frederick, Maryland. He was rated as a four-star recruit by 247Sports and committed to play college football for the Michigan Wolverines over offers from Clemson, Kentucky, and Wisconsin.

== College career ==
In the 2024 ReliaQuest Bowl, Nichols totaled two tackles and a forced fumble in an upset win over Alabama. As a freshman during the 2024 season, he played in five games, recording three tackles and a forced fumble. In 2025, Nichols notched 19 tackles with five and a half for a loss and a sack.
