= Zeke Berry =

American football player (born 2003)

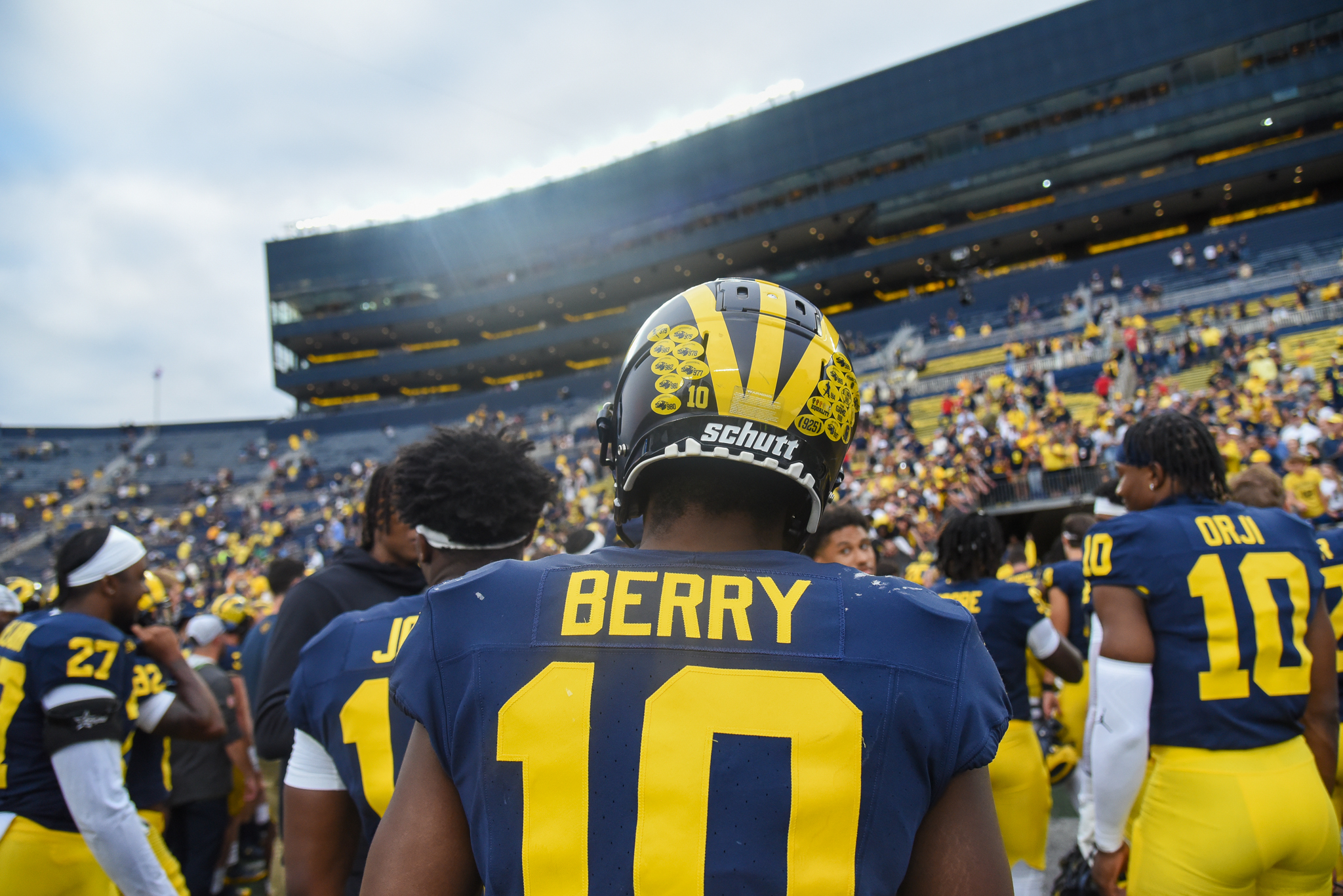
- Berry with the Michigan Wolverines in 2023

No. 10 – Michigan Wolverines
- Position: Defensive back
- Class: Senior

Personal information
- Born: November 26, 2003 (age 22)
- Listed height: 5 ft 11 in (1.80 m)
- Listed weight: 188 lb (85 kg)

Career information
- High school: De La Salle (Concord, California)
- College: Michigan (2022–present)

Awards and highlights
- CFP national champion (2023); Second-team All-Big Ten (2025)
- Stats at ESPN

Ezekiel Berry (born November 26, 2003) is an American college football defensive back for the Michigan Wolverines. He has won two Big Ten Conference titles, a national championship in 2023, and earned All-Big Ten honors in 2025.

== Early life ==
Berry was born on November 26, 2003, the son of Charise Poindexter, and attended De La Salle High School in Concord, California. He was rated as a four-star recruit and initially committed to play college football for the Arizona Wildcats, before he flipped his commitment to play for the Michigan Wolverines.

== College career ==
In 2022, Berry enrolled at the University of Michigan and played in two games for the Wolverines, registering one tackle for a loss. In 2023, Berry played in eleven games for Michigan’s national championship team and made three tackles.

In 2024, Berry was named the team's starting nickel cornerback for the opening game against Fresno State. He recorded two tackles and earned his first collegiate interception. In week five against Minnesota, Berry had four tackles and stripped a ball carrier for a fumble recovery. In week eleven against Indiana, Berry recorded his second interception of the season and his career. In 2024, Berry played in all 13 games, starting 12 times (eight as the nickel and four as the outside cornerback). He finished the season with 37 tackles, three tackles for a loss, one sack, one forced fumble, one fumble recovery, two interceptions and led the team with nine passes defended. Berry was an All-Big Ten honorable mention following the season. In 2025, Berry earned second-team All-Big Ten honors, finishing the season with 33 tackles, a team-leading 10 passes defended and one interception. Berry briefly entered the NCAA transfer portal after Sherrone Moore was fired and Don Martindale was not retained, but returned to Michigan for his final season in 2026.
