= Ty Haywood =

American football player (born 2006)

No. 72 – Alabama Crimson Tide
- Position: Offensive tackle
- Class: Redshirt Freshman

Personal information
- Born: October 22, 2006 (age 20); Mississippi, U.S.
- Listed height: 6 ft 5 in (1.96 m)
- Listed weight: 312 lb (142 kg)

Career information
- High school: Billy Ryan (Denton, Texas)
- College: Michigan (2025); Alabama (2026–present)

Ty Haywood (born October 22, 2006) is an American college football offensive tackle for the Alabama Crimson Tide. He previously played for the Michigan Wolverines.

== Early life ==
Haywood was born on October 22, 2006 in Mississippi, the son of Carlo and Leatha Haywood, and attended Billy Ryan High School in Denton, Texas. He was a 2025 Navy All-American Bowl participant and was rated as a five-star recruit in the 2025 college football recruiting class, ranked No. 16 by ESPN, and No. 20 by USA Today. In July 2024, Haywood initially committed to play college football for Kalen DeBoer and the Alabama Crimson Tide. On National Signing Day, February 5, 2025, he switched his commitment and signed with the Michigan Wolverines to play for head coach Sherrone Moore.
