= Cole Sullivan =

American football linebacker (born 2005)

No. 18 – Oklahoma Sooners
- Position: Linebacker
- Class: Junior

Personal information
- Born: September 25, 2005 (age 21)
- Listed height: 6 ft 4 in (1.93 m)
- Listed weight: 230 lb (104 kg)

Career information
- High school: Central Catholic (Pittsburgh, Pennsylvania)
- College: Michigan (2024–2025); Oklahoma (2026–present)
- Stats at ESPN

Cole Sullivan (born September 25, 2005) is an American college football linebacker for the Oklahoma Sooners. He previously played for the Michigan Wolverines.

== Early life ==
Sullivan attended high school at Central Catholic located in Pittsburgh, Pennsylvania. In his junior season, he recorded 117 tackles, two sacks, four pass deflections, and a forced fumble, while hauling in 14 passes for 268 yards. Coming out of high school, Sullivan was rated as a three-star recruit, where he committed to play college football for the Michigan Wolverines over offers from 16 other schools such as Notre Dame, Duke, Stanford, and Wisconsin.

== College career ==
During his first collegiate season in 2024, Sullivan appeared in 12 games, where he tallied four tackles. He entered the 2025 season, in line for an increase in playing time and a key-role on the Michigan defense. In week one of the 2025 season, Sullivan recorded five tackles, a sack, and an interception in a victory over New Mexico. In week two, he notched three tackles and a sack in a loss against the Oklahoma Sooners.
