= Rayshaun Benny =

American football player (born 2002)

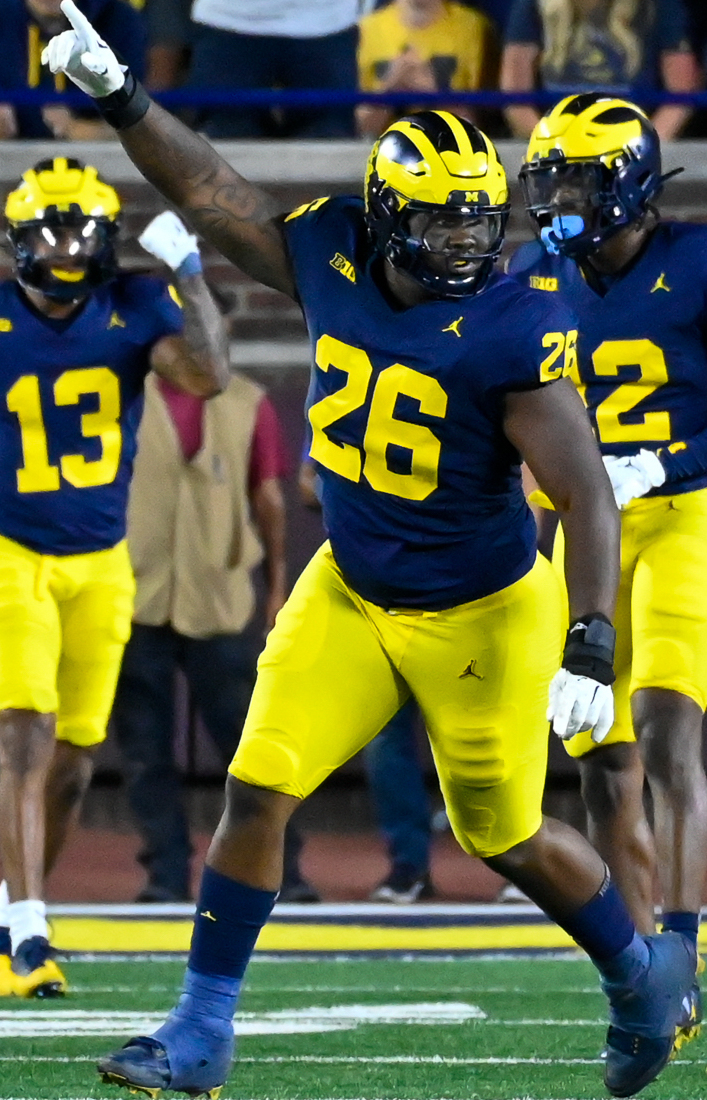
- Benny with the Michigan Wolverines in 2024

No. 99 – Baltimore Ravens
- Position: Defensive tackle
- Roster status: Practice squad

Personal information
- Born: May 8, 2002 (age 24); Oak Park, Michigan, U.S.
- Listed height: 6 ft 3 in (1.91 m)
- Listed weight: 298 lb (135 kg)

Career information
- High school: Oak Park
- College: Michigan (2021–2025)
- NFL draft: 2026: 7th round, 250th overall pick

Career history
- Baltimore Ravens (2026–present)*
- * Offseason or practice squad member only

Awards and highlights
- CFP national champion (2023); Third-team All-Big Ten (2025)
- Stats at Pro Football Reference

Rayshaun Cortez Benny (born May 8, 2002) is an American professional football defensive tackle for the Baltimore Ravens of the National Football League (NFL). He played college football for the Michigan Wolverines, winning three consecutive Big Ten Conference titles and a national championship in 2023. Benny was selected by the Baltimore Ravens in the seventh round of the 2026 NFL draft.

== Early life ==
Benny was born on May 8, 2002, the son of Regina McCain, and attended Oak Park High School in Oak Park, Michigan. As a senior, he notched 32 tackles and five and a half sacks. Coming out of high school, Benny was rated as a four-star recruit, the sixth best player in the state of Michigan, and the 195th overall player in the class of 2021. Initially, he committed to play college football for the Michigan State Spartans over offers from Alabama, Georgia, LSU, Michigan, Notre Dame, Penn State and Oklahoma. However, Benny later flipped his commitment to play for the Michigan Wolverines.

== College career ==
In first three collegiate seasons from 2021 to 2023, Benny appeared in 30 games and totaled 43 tackles, six for a loss, a sack, two pass deflections and a forced fumble. He won a national championship with Michigan in 2023 over the Washington Huskies, where he served as an honorary captain for the Wolverines after suffering a broken ankle in the 2024 Rose Bowl. In the 2024 season opener, Benny had five tackles, two for a loss, including a sack in a win over Fresno State. In total, Benny played in 11 games and started four times in 2024. He finished the season with 29 tackles, four tackles for a loss and 1.5 sacks.

== Professional career ==
Pre-draft measurables
| Height | Weight | Arm length | Hand span | Wingspan |
|---|---|---|---|---|
| 6 ft 3 1/4 in (1.91 m) | 298 lb (135 kg) | 33 3/8 in (0.85 m) | 9 1/4 in (0.23 m) | 6 ft 9 5/8 in (2.07 m) |
All values from NFL Combine

Benny was selected by the Baltimore Ravens in the seventh round with the 250th overall pick of the 2026 NFL draft. On August 30, 2026, Benny was waived by Baltimore as a part of final roster cuts; he was re-signed to the team's practice squad the next day.
