= Show-cause penalty =

Most severe sanction the NCAA may levy on a coach

In the National Collegiate Athletic Association (NCAA), a show-cause penalty is an administrative punishment ordering that any NCAA penalties imposed on a coach found to have committed major rules violations will stay in effect against that coach for a specified period of time—and could also be transferred to any other NCAA-member school that hires the coach while the sanctions are still in effect.

== Description ==
Both the school and coach are required to send letters to the NCAA agreeing to abide by any restrictions imposed. They must also report back to the NCAA every six months until either the end of the coach's employment or the show-cause penalty (whichever comes first). If the school wishes to avoid the NCAA penalties imposed on that coach, it must send representatives to appear before the NCAA's Committee on Infractions and "show cause" (i.e., prove the existence of good reason) as to why it should not be penalized for hiring that coach. The penalty is intended to prevent a coach from escaping punishment for violations that he/she had a role in committing or allowing—which are generally applied to the school (e.g., lost scholarships, forfeited and vacated wins)—by merely resigning and taking a coaching job at another, unpenalized school. It is currently the most severe penalty that can be brought against an American collegiate coach.

An NCAA member school is allowed to hire a coach who is under an ongoing show-cause order, but the restrictions make it prohibitively difficult for a coach with a show-cause order to get another collegiate job. As mentioned above, any school that hires a coach with an outstanding show-cause order can be penalized merely for hiring them. Additionally, that school could be severely punished if such a coach commits additional violations while the show-cause order is still in effect. Consequently, most schools will not even consider hiring a coach with a show-cause penalty in effect, meaning that it usually has the effect of blackballing that coach from the collegiate ranks for at least the duration of the penalty. Many coaches who receive a show-cause penalty never coach again even after the penalty expires, since a large number of athletic directors and university presidents/chancellors are unwilling to hire someone with a history of major violations due to the potentially disastrous effects the hiring could have on the program.

== Notable show-cause penalties ==
=== Men's basketball ===
- Bob Wade – former head coach for the Maryland Terrapins, who provided a loan to a recruit and free clothes to his players; he also lied to the NCAA and held meetings with his staff where they made plans to lie. For this, he was hit with a five-year show-cause penalty, which expired in 1995. Wade has not returned to the coaching ranks since.
- Norm Sloan – Former head coach at four NCAA schools, most notably at Florida (where he served two stints) and North Carolina State (where he led the Wolfpack to an NCAA title), he was forced to retire from his second stint at Florida shortly before the start of the 1989–90 season amid an NCAA investigation. During the investigation, it was revealed that Florida star Vernon Maxwell had accepted money from agents without Sloan's knowledge; Sloan himself had purchased a plane ticket to enable Maxwell to work at a basketball camp; and one of Sloan's assistants had allowed a recruit's mother to use the return leg of her son's plane ticket to return home after he had enrolled in another school. When the NCAA announced its findings in September 1990, Sloan was hit with a five-year show-cause. He died in 2003 without ever returning to college coaching.
- Todd Bozeman – Former coach for the California Golden Bears, who had paid for a player's parents to watch their son play and lied about it to school and NCAA officials. He was forced to resign in 1996 and was handed an eight-year show-cause penalty, which expired in 2004. He returned to college coaching in 2006 as head coach of the Morgan State Bears, a program that had spent much of its existence in Division II, until moving to Division I in the early 2000s. Bozeman held that position until being fired at the end of the 2018–19 season after a string of six sub-.500 seasons.
- Clem Haskins – Former head coach for the Minnesota Golden Gophers, who was guilty of paying a tutor to write papers for players on the team; he also lied to the NCAA about those payments and encouraged his players to lie as well. For that he was hit with a seven-year show-cause penalty. This penalty expired in 2007, but Haskins has not returned to collegiate coaching.
- Dave Bliss – Former head coach for the Baylor Bears (a Division I program), and the central figure in the scandal that engulfed the program in 2003, starting with the murder of Patrick Dennehy, a New Mexico transfer, by Baylor player Carlton Dotson that June. In the wake of Dennehy's death, it was revealed that Bliss had paid tuition for Dennehy and another Baylor player. Bliss lied to investigators about the payments, and worse yet, encouraged players and assistant coaches to lie. Bliss went so far as to suggest that the players tell investigators and law enforcement that Dennehy had paid for his tuition by dealing drugs. One of his assistant coaches secretly taped these conversations, and sent them to the NCAA; the tapes were later leaked to the media. Dotson's estranged wife and the mother of another former Baylor player also reported widespread abuse of marijuana and alcohol by players that neither Bliss, his staff, nor the Baylor athletic department ever addressed. Bliss was forced to resign, and in 2005 was hit with a ten-year show-cause penalty. Two of his assistants were also given show-cause penalties of five and seven years, respectively. The assistant coach who taped the conversations, Abar Rouse, escaped NCAA punishment, but was effectively blacklisted by the coaching community for his disloyalty. In April 2015, Bliss was hired as the coach at NAIA-member school Southwestern Christian University, a position he resigned from in April 2017, following the airing of the Showtime documentary Disgraced, which chronicled the cover-up at Baylor.
- Kelvin Sampson – Former head coach of the Oklahoma Sooners and the Indiana Hoosiers, who was guilty of making impermissible cell phone calls to recruits. He landed Oklahoma on probation before leaving for Indiana in 2006. When he repeated the violations at Indiana, he was forced to resign from that institution in 2008. That same year, the NCAA gave Sampson a five-year show-cause penalty, effective until 2013. Sampson was able to parlay his connections within the coaching community into assistant coach positions with two NBA teams (the Milwaukee Bucks [2008–2011], and the Houston Rockets, [2011–2014]) before returning to college head coaching at Houston in spring 2014.

NOTE: Bliss and Sampson coached against each other in the August 27, 2011 Oklahoma Alumni Legends Game that was decided in sudden death overtime.

- Rob Senderoff – Former assistant at Indiana under Sampson who was found to have made numerous impermissible calls to recruits. He resigned in 2007, but was rehired by Kent State, where he had served as an assistant for five years before joining Sampson at IU, before the NCAA announced its findings. Senderoff was hit with a 30-month show-cause in November 2008. Kent State chose to keep him on its staff, presumably accepting any NCAA restrictions on his activities. After Geno Ford left for Bradley after the 2010–11 season, Senderoff was named as interim head coach and then permanent head coach. His show-cause expired on May 25, 2011.
- Neil McCarthy – Former basketball coach at New Mexico State, who was fired before the 1997–98 season due to concerns about his players' poor academic performance. During a deposition for a wrongful-termination suit, McCarthy admitted under oath that he'd agreed to hire a junior-college coach as an assistant if two of his players came to New Mexico State. This triggered an investigation which revealed the junior-college coach had helped the players with their coursework and exams. In 2001, the NCAA gave McCarthy a five-year show-cause order, effective until 2006. He had previously been hit with a two-year show-cause from 1995 to 1997 after one of his assistants had helped players with coursework. The junior-college coach, who had been hired as an assistant before being fired with the rest of McCarthy's staff, was hit with a 10-year show-cause order. McCarthy died in 2021 without ever returning to coaching.
- Bruce Pearl – The former coach of the Tennessee Volunteers received a three-year show-cause penalty (which expired on August 23, 2014) for lying to the NCAA about an impermissible visit to his home by prospective recruit Aaron Craft (who eventually went to Ohio State). While this was only a minor violation, the NCAA felt Pearl's lies elevated it to a major one. Had Pearl coached during this period, he would have been banned from taking part in most recruiting activities. Each of his assistants received one-year show-cause orders. Pearl was hired as head coach at Auburn in March 2014—the first known instance of a coach being hired at a power conference school after serving a show-cause. During the July 2014 recruiting period, he was allowed to evaluate players but was barred from contact with them.
- Brad Greenberg – The former head coach at Radford, who left the school at the end of the 2010–11 season, was hit with a five-year show-cause on February 24, 2012, for leading an effort to mislead NCAA investigators who were looking into major recruiting violations at Radford. He was specifically prohibited from recruiting activities during his show-cause. Three of his assistants at the time received two-year show-causes that included recruiting bans. Greenberg has not coached at the college level since his penalty was inflicted.
- Gib Arnold – The former head coach at Hawaiʻi, who was fired shortly before the 2014–15 season amid an NCAA investigation into the program, received a three-year show-cause on December 23, 2015, for violations of NCAA ethical conduct rules. In March 2014, the university reported that one of Arnold's former assistants had altered a financial document and submitted the fraudulent document on behalf of a recruit, and that Arnold's wife had given the recruit an iPad and the assistant allowed the recruit to keep it. The assistant received a two-year show-cause. In addition to the show-causes, the basketball program was hit with a postseason ban for the 2016–17 season, lost two scholarships in both the 2016–17 and 2017–18 seasons (extending a self-imposed scholarship reduction of one in each of those seasons), and received three years' probation. At the time the penalty was announced, Arnold was a scout with the Boston Celtics. He has not returned to coaching since being penalized.
- Donnie Tyndall – The former head coach at Morehead State, Southern Miss and Tennessee, Tyndall received a 10-year show cause penalty on April 8, 2016—at the time tied with Bliss for the longest on record for a head basketball coach—for numerous incidents of academic fraud, arranging payments to players and covering up the payments while at Southern Miss. Tennessee fired him in 2014 after the extent of the violations at Southern Miss became known. The penalty runs until April 7, 2026. If he is hired by an NCAA member school during this period, he will be suspended from coaching duties-effectively banning him from the collegiate coaching ranks until the end of the 2025–26 season. If Tyndall is hired by an NCAA member school after the penalty runs out, he will be suspended for the first half of the first season of his return. This led USA Today to call Tyndall's penalty the most severe ever meted out to a head coach. However, Tyndall has served as a head coach both in the G-League and at a junior college subsequent to the show-cause penalty.
- Andre McGee – The former Louisville director of operations received a 10-year show-cause, then tied for the longest on record for any men's basketball coach, on June 15, 2017. In 2015, a self-described former madam alleged that McGee had paid her $10,000 from 2010 to 2014—a period that included Louisville's most recent national championship—to organize strip shows, including sex acts, for players and recruits. The NCAA found her allegations credible enough to place Louisville on four years' probation, suspend head coach Rick Pitino for Louisville's first five ACC games in 2017–18 (Pitino would subsequently be fired by the university before the suspension began, stemming from an unrelated matter), and order an as-yet-undetermined number of wins to be vacated, potentially including the 2013 national title. An appeal by Louisville failed, and the school was officially stripped of its 2013 title in February 2018.
- B. J. Hill – The former head coach at Northern Colorado, Hill received a six-year show-cause on December 15, 2017. Following an investigation into academic fraud in the program, the NCAA found that nine members of Hill's staff had done coursework for players, paid for prospects' classes, and arranged for off-campus practices with an ineligible player between Hill's arrival at the school in 2010 and 2014. In addition, Hill had personally completed course work for a prospect and enlisted an athletic trainer to do the same. The university fired Hill and his entire staff in 2016 once it learned of the violations, and self-imposed a postseason ban for the 2016–17 season. The NCAA imposed three years of probation, ordered the vacation of the team's appearance in the 2010 NCAA tournament, and imposed a scholarship reduction through 2018–19, but no further postseason ban. Five former full-time assistants and one graduate assistant received show-causes ranging from three to five years.
- Kevin Ollie – The former head coach at UConn, where he had led the Huskies to a national title in 2014, Ollie received a three-year show-cause on July 2, 2019. The NCAA found that Ollie had failed to monitor his staff and alleged that he had lied to and/or misled NCAA investigators. The specific situations cited by the NCAA in its decision were pickup games in excess of allowable preseason activity limits; exceeding the allowed number of men's basketball coaches by giving a video coordinator duties that effectively made him an extra coach; and allowing a booster to provide extra benefits to players, three of whom were deemed to have been rendered ineligible for NCAA play. UConn had fired Ollie after the 2017–18 season while the NCAA investigation which led to the show-cause was pending. The NCAA imposed two years of probation, ordered that UConn vacate the results of games in which the three ineligible players were involved, and imposed a number of minor recruiting restrictions, but did not ban the Huskies from postseason play.
- Kevin Stallings – The former Vanderbilt and Pittsburgh head coach received a three-year show-cause on February 20, 2020, after the NCAA found that he had violated limits on the number of coaches allowed on his staff during the 2015–18 period. More specifically, he instructed three non-coaching staffers in performing coaching duties, allowed them to perform said duties, developed a system to prevent outside parties from discovering their presence at practices, and ordered deletion of video evidence of their presence. The show-cause order expired on February 19, 2023, but Stallings has not returned to coaching; had he been hired by another NCAA school while the penalty was in force, he would have been suspended for the first 30% of the first season of his return. At the same time, Pitt head football coach Pat Narduzzi received a show-cause for similar but less egregious violations, but his penalty was limited to being withheld from one week of off-campus recruiting in the 2019–20 recruiting cycle and suspended from two days of team practices in August 2020.
- Jerome Allen – The former Penn head coach received a 15-year show-cause—tied for the longest on record in any NCAA sport—on February 26, 2020. During a federal criminal trial in 2019, Allen testified that he had received $300,000 in bribes from Philip Esformes, a nursing-home mogul who was convicted on charges related to one of the largest health-care fraud schemes in U.S. history. Allen himself pleaded guilty to one money laundering charge, but received no prison time. These bribes were in exchange for Allen training, recruiting and ensuring the admission to Penn of Esformes' son as a basketball player. Penn had fired Allen in 2015, two years before the FBI approached him regarding the Esformes investigation. The Penn program received two years of probation, and the NCAA ruled that any program that hires Allen after his show-cause expires must suspend him for the first half of its season. Allen has not worked in the college ranks since the penalty was announced, having been an NBA assistant coach since 2015.
- Mark Gottfried - The former head coach at Murray State, Alabama, NC State and Cal State Northridge, Gottfried received a one-year show-cause on December 20, 2021. This came after a two-year investigation into NC State's recruitment of Dennis Smith Jr., who was the recipient of a $40,000 payment from Wolfpack assistant Orlando Early. Gottfried was charged with two Level I violations for failing to monitor Early and with not exercising control over the program. The penalty runs until December 19, 2023; it was the first handed down under the NCAA's Independent Accountability Resolution Process for complex infractions cases. Gottfried had been hired at Cal State Northridge in 2018, shortly before the NCAA investigation began. Just before the start of the 2020–21 season, Cal State Northridge began an internal investigation into NCAA violations under Gottfried and placed him on an administrative leave from which he never returned; he and Cal State Northridge mutually agreed to part ways shortly after the show-cause penalty was handed down.

=== Women's basketball ===
- Al Barbre – The head coach for the Lamar University women's basketball team in the early 1990s. Barbre's program was the subject of an NCAA investigation shortly after a record-breaking 1990–91 season. He was found guilty of making illegal payments to players and received a five-year show-cause penalty when Lamar was placed on probation late in 1992. Barbre has not been a head coach at an NCAA institution since.
- Phil Collins – An assistant at UNC Greensboro, Collins was fired in May 2018 after it emerged that he had bet extensively on professional and college sports, including on UNCG men's basketball games, for at least two years. The NCAA bans athletic personnel from betting, legally or otherwise, on any competition (including professional levels) in any sport in which the NCAA sponsors a championship. On July 25, 2019, the NCAA gave Collins a 15-year show-cause order–at the time the longest such penalty on record for any NCAA sport–effective until 2034. The former assistant director of the school's fundraising organization received a four-year show-cause for making similar but less extensive wagers, and the UNCG women's program was placed on probation for 3 years, but with no scholarship reductions or postseason bans.

=== Football ===
- Willie Anderson – The recruiting coordinator for Oklahoma State in the late 1980s, Anderson was given a 12-year show-cause penalty when the Cowboys landed on probation in January 1989, after the NCAA ruled him guilty of making cash payments to players. The scandal led to 1988 Heisman Trophy winner Barry Sanders declaring for the 1989 NFL draft with one year of college eligibility remaining, and led to a change in NFL draft eligibility rules to allow entry three years after their high school class graduated. Anderson had been previously implicated in major recruiting violations at Clemson when that school landed on probation earlier in the decade. After his penalty was served, Anderson did not return to college football.
- Claude Bassett – The recruiting coordinator for Kentucky under Hal Mumme, Bassett was forced to resign in 2000 for numerous NCAA violations, including giving improper gifts to prospects and writing papers for them. In 2002, the NCAA slapped him with an eight-year show-cause penalty.
- Todd McNair – The running backs coach at the University of Southern California under Pete Carroll, McNair was found guilty of providing false information to the NCAA and covering up rules violations involving All-American running back Reggie Bush in 2004 and 2005. After Carroll left and was replaced by Lane Kiffin, McNair retained his position despite NCAA allegations against him. When he received a one-year show-cause penalty in 2010, USC did not renew his contract after it expired. McNair appealed the penalty, but it was upheld in April 2011.
- Jim Tressel – The former head coach of the Ohio State Buckeyes, Tressel was forced to resign three months before the start of the 2011 season for lying to the NCAA about student athletes receiving tattoos and cash for signed memorabilia. According to the NCAA, he had four chances to tell the truth and failed to do so. For this, he was given a five-year show-cause penalty (until December 19, 2016). Had he gotten another head coaching job before then, he would have had to sit out the first five games of the first regular season of his return, as well as any postseason games (including conference championship games and bowl games). However, Tressel was named the new president of Youngstown State University in May 2014, and publicly announced that he is retired from coaching.
- John Blake – A former head coach at Oklahoma who, before being penalized, had been defensive line coach at North Carolina, Blake was forced to resign during an NCAA investigation into academic fraud and recruiting violations in the UNC program. The NCAA found that he had received personal loans from agent Gary Wichard and failed to report them to the university, and also misled investigators. On March 12, 2012, he received a three-year show-cause. In February 2016, after his show-cause expired, he was hired as a defensive line coach at Lamar, but left the next month for the same position with the NFL's Buffalo Bills. Blake died in July 2020.
- Chip Kelly - A former head coach at Oregon who received an 18-month show-cause in June 2013, by which time he had already left Oregon to become head coach of the NFL's Philadelphia Eagles. Other penalties assessed against Oregon included three lost scholarships, three years of probation, a reduction of Oregon's official paid visits from 56 to 37 for the next three academic years, three seasons of reduced evaluation days, and a ban on use of recruiting services during the probation period. The NCAA had been looking into Oregon's recruiting practices since questions arose over a 2010 payment of $25,000 to Willie Lyles and his Houston-based recruiting service, Complete Scouting Services. The infractions committee found that Lyles provided cash and free lodging to Lache Seastrunk, a running back who eventually signed with Baylor, and engaged in impermissible calls and off-campus contact with prospects, their families and high school coaches. It also said the football program permitted staff members to engage in recruiting activity, exceeding coaching limits. Kelly's show-cause expired on December 26, 2014, while he was coaching the Eagles. After being fired by the Eagles after the 2015 season and serving as head coach of the San Francisco 49ers for the 2016 season, he eventually returned to college coaching when he was hired as the new head coach at UCLA after the 2017 season. He is the first Division I head football coach to land another head coaching job after receiving a show-cause.
- Dan Mullen - In his third year as Florida head coach, Mullen received a one-year show-cause in December 2020 as part of a negotiated resolution to recruiting violations charges. The NCAA found that Mullen did not promote an atmosphere of compliance, having had planned off-campus contact with a recruit who was ineligible to be recruited at the time. In addition to Mullen's show-cause, additional punishments were included in the settlement including a fine, a staff-wide seven-day off-campus recruiting ban in spring 2021, and one-on-one rules education for Mullen and an unnamed assistant.
- Jeremy Pruitt - A former head coach at Tennessee who received a six-year show-cause in July 2023 for his role in recruiting violations that had resulted in his firing following the 2020 season. The program was put on probation for five years, and the NCAA, while critical of Tennessee for a lack of institutional control at the program during the Pruitt era, cited Tennessee's cooperation in the investigation as a mitigating factor in its decision to not assess a postseason ban. As for Pruitt, any school that hires him during his show-cause penalty will be required to suspend him for his entire first season with their program.
- Herm Edwards - The former head coach of Arizona State was pushed out three games into the 2022 season amid an investigation into recruiting violations. The NCAA and Arizona State ultimately discovered that Edwards had been involved in numerous impermissible contacts with recruits during a "dead period" imposed for health and safety reasons during the worst of the COVID-19 pandemic. For this, he received a five-year show-cause order, effective until 2029. If he is ever hired by another NCAA member school while the show-cause is in effect, he will be suspended for the first season of his return. Six of his former assistants were hit with show-cause orders ranging from three to ten years. Edwards, who by this time had returned to ESPN as an NFL analyst, accepted the penalties on April 15, but the NCAA did not announce the agreement until October because a hearing with former assistant Antonio Pierce was still pending. Pierce, identified as the mastermind of the scheme, was hit with an eight-year show-cause order.
- Jim Harbaugh - After leaving Michigan following their national championship season to become the head coach of the Los Angeles Chargers, Harbaugh received a four-year show-cause on August 7, 2024, for impermissible contact with recruits and players during the COVID-19 dead period. Michigan had previously reached an agreement to be on probation for three years along with recruiting limits and a fine. But because Harbaugh did not agree with the NCAA and its investigation, he was investigated separately, prompting additional punishments after those levied on Michigan. The NCAA noted that his purported intentional disregard for NCAA legislation and unethical conduct increased the case's severity and resulted in the NCAA to classify Harbaugh's case as Level I-Aggravated. If Harbaugh returns to the collegiate ranks before the order expires, he will be suspended for one season. After that initial season, Harbaugh would still be prohibited from taking part in practice, traveling with the team, video study, recruiting, and team meetings until the order expires.
- Michigan sign-stealing scandal – On August 15, 2025, the NCAA announced added sanctions for the Michigan football program stemming from the 2023 scandal, as well as other impermissible recruiting practices. Michigan football was placed on probation for four additional years and received a fine expected to total several million dollars. The following individuals drew show-cause penalties:
  - Harbaugh received an additional 10-year show-cause penalty, effective with the 2028 expiration of the show-cause he is currently serving. He will be suspended for one season if he takes another collegiate job during this time. The cumulative effect of both show-causes will make it prohibitively difficult for Harbaugh to work in college football again until at least 2038.
  - Connor Stalions, the former Wolverines staffer who organized the sign-stealing scheme, received an eight-year show-cause.
  - Former Wolverines Assistant director of player personnel Denard Robinson, who was determined to have made improper inducements to recruits, received a three-year show-cause.
  - Then-current Michigan head coach Sherrone Moore, who was an assistant coach at the time of the sign-stealing scheme, received a two-year show-cause, mostly for deleting evidence of the scheme. Moore received a three-game suspension; with Michigan having already self-imposed a suspension for the first two games of the 2025 season, he would have been suspended for the first game of the 2026 season. However, Moore was fired following the 2025 season due to an unrelated sexual misconduct scandal. Moore will not be restricted from any coaching activities apart from the suspensions.

=== Baseball ===
- Brad Bohannon - The former head coach at Alabama, who was suspended with intent to terminate in May 2023 after being caught providing inside information to someone placing a bet on a Crimson Tide game against LSU. When Bohannon refused to cooperate with an internal investigation, Alabama began the process of firing him for cause. Bohannon resigned rather than face certain termination. He received a 15-year show-cause penalty – tied for the longest on record in any NCAA sport – on February 1, 2024. The NCAA not only faulted him for his involvement in gambling activity, but for refusing to cooperate with Alabama or the NCAA in their joint investigation. Should Bohannon be hired by another NCAA school while the show-cause is in effect, he will be barred from coaching duties for his first five full regular seasons.
