= Sherrone Moore =

American football player and coach (born 1986)

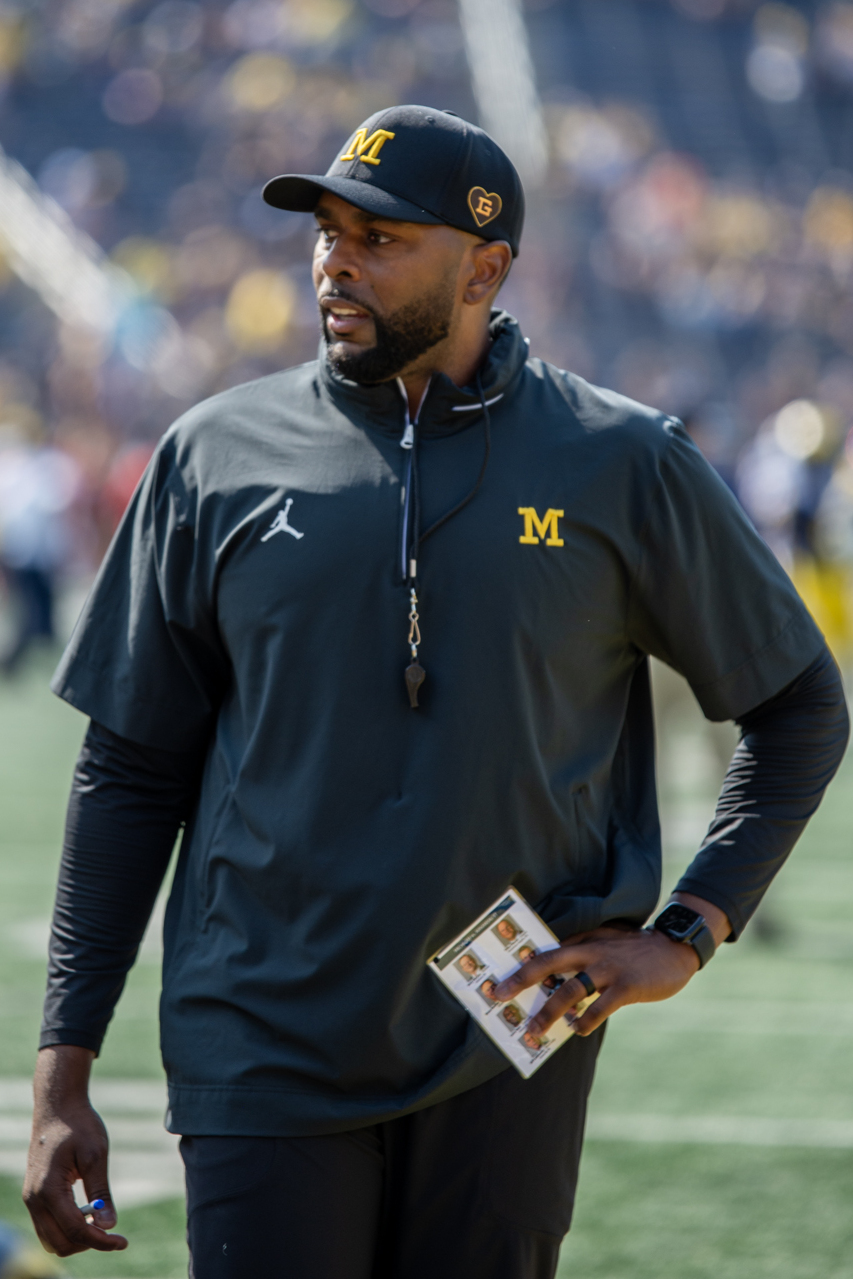
- Moore with Michigan in 2024

Biographical details
- Born: February 3, 1986 (age 40); Derby, Kansas, U.S.
- Education: University of Oklahoma (2008); University of Louisville (2011)

Playing career
- 2004–2005: Butler (KS)
- 2006–2007: Oklahoma
- Position: Guard

Coaching career (HC unless noted)
- 2009–2011: Louisville (GA)
- 2012–2013: Louisville (TE)
- 2014–2016: Central Michigan (TE)
- 2017: Central Michigan (AHC/TE/RC)
- 2018–2020: Michigan (TE)
- 2021–2022: Michigan (co-OC/OL)
- 2023: Michigan (OC/OL/acting HC)
- 2024–2025: Michigan

Head coaching record
- Overall: 16–8
- Bowls: 1–0

Accomplishments and honors

Championships
- National (2023)

Sherrone Banfield Moore (first name /ʃər.ˈoʊn/; born February 3, 1986) is an American former college football head coach and player. He most recently served as the head football coach for the University of Michigan. Moore served as Michigan's acting head coach in four games during the national championship-winning 2023 season. He succeeded Jim Harbaugh as head coach in 2024, until his termination after the regular season in 2025.

Moore played football as an offensive guard at the University of Oklahoma from 2006 to 2007. He was an assistant coach at the University of Louisville from 2009 to 2013 and Central Michigan University from 2014 to 2017. Moore first joined the Michigan Wolverines coaching staff in 2018 as the tight ends coach, and was promoted to co-offensive coordinator and offensive line coach in 2021.

== Early life and playing career ==
Sherrone Banfield Moore was born on February 3, 1986, in Derby, Kansas. He graduated from Derby High School in 2004. He played two seasons of junior college football for Butler Community College before transferring to play for the Oklahoma Sooners in 2006. At Oklahoma, Moore appeared in 14 games as an offensive guard. Moore earned his bachelor's degree in communications from the University of Oklahoma in 2008.

== Coaching career ==
=== Louisville ===
Moore joined the Louisville staff as a graduate assistant in 2009 under head coach Steve Kragthorpe, and continued in that role under new head coach Charlie Strong through 2011. In 2012, he was hired as a full-time assistant, working as tight ends coach through the 2013 season. During his time as a graduate assistant, Moore earned a master's degree in sports administration.

=== Central Michigan ===
In February 2014, Moore was hired as tight ends coach at Central Michigan by head coach Dan Enos, and in 2015 was retained by new head coach John Bonamego. In 2017, Moore was named assistant head coach and recruiting coordinator in addition to serving as tight ends coach.

=== Michigan ===
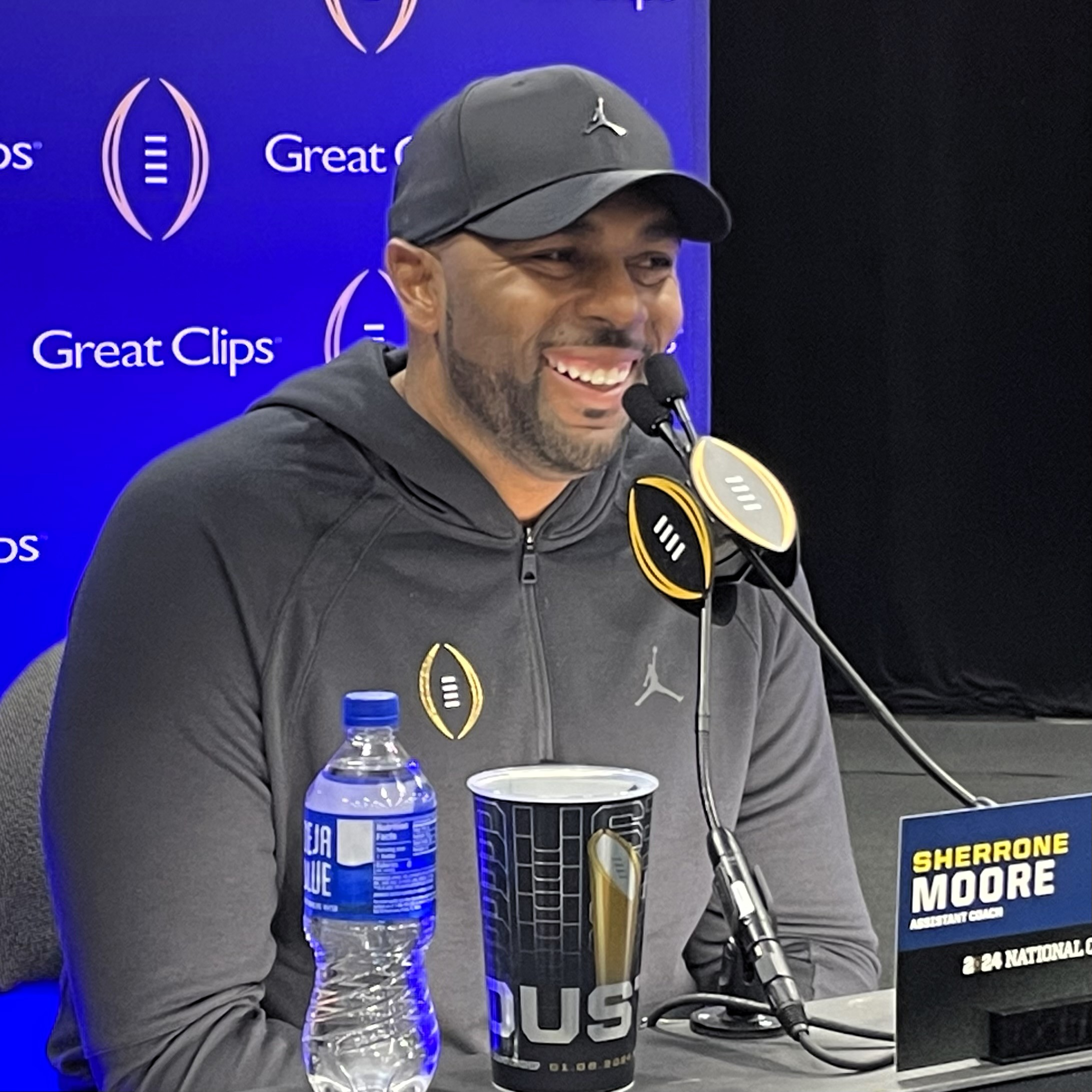
Moore talking to the press at media day ahead of the 2024 CFP National Championship.

On January 15, 2018, Moore was hired by the University of Michigan as the tight ends coach. On January 25, 2021, after three seasons as the tight ends coach, Moore was promoted to co-offensive coordinator and offensive line coach. Under Moore's leadership, the Michigan offensive line won the Joe Moore Award as the best offensive line in the country in both 2021 and 2022. This was the first time that a school had won the award in back-to-back seasons since the award was established in 2015.

==== 2023 ====
To start the 2023 season, the University of Michigan imposed a one game suspension for Moore, along with a three-game suspension for head coach Jim Harbaugh, due to prior recruiting violations. Moore served his suspension during Michigan's season-opening win over East Carolina. On September 16, with Harbaugh suspended, Moore served as the acting head coach for the team's third game of the season against Bowling Green. Moore led the Wolverines to a 31–6 victory over the Falcons, giving him his first official win as a head coach.

Following Harbaugh's second suspension of the 2023 season, this time imposed by the Big Ten Conference in response to the University of Michigan football sign-stealing scandal, Moore was again named the acting head coach (still retaining his play-calling as offensive coordinator). This time for the remaining three regular season games, with Michigan 9–0 on the season when he assumed the role. In the first game, the Wolverines defeated No. 10 Penn State on the road, 24–15, on November 11. The following week, he led Michigan to a 31–24 win at Maryland, the school's college-football-leading 1,000th victory. In the final week of the regular season, Moore led the Wolverines to a 30–24 victory over No. 2 Ohio State. Harbaugh was credited with these three wins. After the regular season, Moore was named a finalist for the Broyles Award given to the top assistant coach in college football in 2023. Moore resumed his role as offensive coordinator and offensive line coach for Michigan's wins in the Big Ten Championship Game, Rose Bowl, and College Football Playoff National Championship to complete an undefeated 15–0 season.

==== 2024 ====
On January 26, 2024, Moore was named Michigan's 21st head football coach following Harbaugh's departure to the Los Angeles Chargers, agreeing to a five-year, $27.5 million contract. He was the first African American to be hired as head coach at the University of Michigan. On August 4, 2024, ESPN reported that a draft of a notice of allegations from the National Collegiate Athletic Association (NCAA) concerning the sign-stealing scandal indicated that Moore was one of seven members of Michigan's 2023 coaching staff accused of violating NCAA rules. The draft alleges that in October 2023 Moore deleted a thread containing 52 text messages with Connor Stalions, former Michigan staffer. Moore later produced the deleted messages to the NCAA, which were found to contain no incriminating information. In November 2024, Moore secured a commitment from the No. 1 overall ranked high school recruit in the nation, quarterback Bryce Underwood, in his first recruiting class as a head coach.

In Moore’s first season, he led the Michigan Wolverines to an 8–5 record on the year, including wins over Michigan State, Ohio State and Alabama. Moore was the first Michigan head coach since Bennie Oosterbaan in 1948 to defeat Michigan State in his first year.

In the regular season finale against the No. 2 ranked Buckeyes, Moore led Michigan to a 13–10 upset victory at Ohio Stadium, despite entering as 20.5 point underdogs. It marked the fourth consecutive victory for Michigan in the Ohio State series, extending their first win streak in the series in the 21st century. On December 31, 2024, Moore won his first postseason game in the ReliaQuest Bowl, as Michigan defeated No. 11 Alabama, 19-13, after entering as 16.5 point underdogs. Michigan became the only program in college football history to beat Alabama twice in the same calendar year (also winning the 2024 Rose Bowl), and the first team since 1978 to win back-to-back games as double digit underdogs.

==== 2025 ====
On May 5, 2025, it was reported that Moore was expected to be suspended by the University of Michigan for the third and fourth games of the 2025 season as part of the school's self-imposed penalties related to the NCAA's sign-stealing investigation. Biff Poggi served as interim head coach during Moore's absence.

In his second season, Moore led the Wolverines to a 9–3 regular-season record and a 7–2 mark in Big Ten play, tying for fourth place in the conference. Michigan opened the season with road losses to No. 18 Oklahoma and USC before winning five consecutive games, including a road victory over rival Michigan State. Entering the regular-season finale ranked No. 15, Michigan had an opportunity to secure a berth in the College Football Playoff but lost at home to No. 1 Ohio State, 27–9. The defeat was Moore's first in three games as head coach against Ohio State and Michigan's first loss in the rivalry since 2019.

==== Firing ====
On December 10, 2025, the University of Michigan announced Moore had been fired for cause due to "credible evidence" that Moore engaged in an inappropriate relationship with a staff member. According to sports commentator, author, and educator John U. Bacon, Michigan first investigated the matter in the summer of 2025 after an anonymous tip, with both parties denying the allegation. Earlier on the same day as Moore's firing, the staff member recanted to administrators with proof of a romantic involvement with him.

== Post-firing ==
On December 10, 2025, hours after his firing by the University of Michigan, Moore was arrested in Saline, Michigan, and booked at Washtenaw County Jail for an alleged assault. The Pittsfield Department of Public Safety, which gained custody over Moore, stated that Moore "was lodged at the Washtenaw County Jail pending review of charges by the Washtenaw County Prosecutor" and that "this incident does not appear to be random in nature." In an interview with Fox 2 Detroit, John U. Bacon stated that the alleged victim was the female staff member he was accused of having an affair with, and that the alleged assault occurred at her home after Moore's termination. On December 12, Moore was arraigned in court after being charged with felonious third-degree home invasion and two misdemeanors: stalking in a domestic relationship and breaking and entering. He was released on $25,000 bond. The court revealed the relationship with his staff member occurred for "a number of years" and ended December 8.

A hearing originally scheduled for March 2, 2026, to determine whether the arrest warrant against Moore was valid, was postponed to March 6, when the court was set to hold an evidentiary hearing regarding the alleged omission of Moore’s relationship with the alleged victim.

On March 6, the day of his scheduled court appearance, Moore agreed to a plea deal with the court before the hearing. The three original charges were dropped, including the felonious home invasion, and Moore plead no contest to two separate misdemeanors: malicious use of a telecommunication device in a domestic relationship and trespassing. On April 14, Moore was sentenced to 18 months probation and was levied around $1,000 in fines.

== Personal life ==
Moore and his wife, Kelli, were married in 2015. They have three daughters.

== Head coaching record ==
| Year | Team | Overall | Conference | Standing | Bowl/playoffs | Coaches^{#} | AP^{°} |
|---|---|---|---|---|---|---|---|
Michigan Wolverines (Big Ten Conference) (2023–2025)
| 2023 | Michigan | 1–0 (Note: Michigan's head coach, Jim Harbaugh, was suspended for the first three games of the 2023 season. Moore served as interim head coach for the third game, a non-conference win over Bowling Green. Harbaugh was suspended a second time, for the final three games of the regular season. Moore served as acting head coach, all victories over conference foes—Penn State, Maryland, and Ohio State—but the games were credited to Harbaugh's record.) | 0–0 | T-1st (East) | | | |
| 2024 | Michigan | 8–5 | 5–4 | T–7th | W ReliaQuest | | |
| 2025 | Michigan | 7–3 (Note: Moore was suspended for the third and fourth games of the 2025 season against Central Michigan and Nebraska, during which Biff Poggi served as interim head coach.) | 6–2 | T–4th | (Note: Moore was fired after the regular season. Biff Poggi served as interim head coach for the 2025 Citrus Bowl.) | | |
| Michigan: | | 16–8 | 11–6 | | | | |
| Total: | | 16–8 | | | | | |
