= 2024 Rose Bowl =

College football bowl game

2024 Rose Bowl presented by Prudential
- College Football Playoff Semifinal; 110th Rose Bowl Game
| Alabama Crimson Tide | Michigan Wolverines |
| (12–1) | (13–0) |
| SEC | Big Ten |
| 20 | 27 |
| Head coach: Nick Saban | Head coach: Jim Harbaugh |
| AP / Coaches / CFP; 5 / 4T / 4 | AP / Coaches / CFP; 1 / 1 / 1 |
| | 1 | 2 | 3 | 4 | OT | Total |
|---|---|---|---|---|---|---|
| Alabama | 7 | 3 | 0 | 10 | 0 | 20 |
| Michigan | 7 | 6 | 0 | 7 | 7 | 27 |
- Date: January 1, 2024
- Season: 2023
- Stadium: Rose Bowl
- Location: Pasadena, California
- Players of the Game: J. J. McCarthy (QB, Michigan); Mason Graham (DT, Michigan)
- Favorite: Michigan by 2
- Referee: Michael Vandervelde (Big 12)
- Halftime show: Michigan Marching Band; University of Alabama Million Dollar Band
- Attendance: 96,371

United States TV coverage
- Network: ESPN; ESPN Deportes
- Announcers: ESPN: Chris Fowler (play-by-play), Kirk Herbstreit (color), Holly Rowe and Laura Rutledge (sidelines); ESPN Deportes: Eduardo Varela (play-by-play) and Pablo Viruega (analyst)
- Nielsen ratings: (27.2 million viewers)

The 2024 Rose Bowl (officially known as the College Football Playoff Semifinal at the 2024 Rose Bowl Game presented by Prudential for sponsorship reasons) was a college football bowl game played on January 1, 2024, at the Rose Bowl in Pasadena, California, United States. The game was the 110th annual playing of the Rose Bowl, one of the semifinals of the 2023–24 College Football Playoff (CFP), concluding the 2023 FBS football season. The game featured two of the four teams chosen by the selection committee to participate in the playoff: the fourth-ranked Alabama Crimson Tide of the Southeastern Conference and the first-ranked Michigan Wolverines of the Big Ten Conference. The winner qualified for the 2024 College Football Playoff National Championship against the winner of the other semifinal, hosted at the Sugar Bowl.

Michigan entered with an undefeated 13–0 record, while Alabama entered with at 12–1. Both teams were champions of their respective conferences: Michigan defeated Iowa in the Big Ten Championship, and Alabama defeated then-No. 1 Georgia in the SEC Championship. It was the sixth meeting between Michigan and Alabama and the fifth to occur in the postseason, and Alabama led the overall series 3–2 entering the game. Additionally, the teams entered as the two college football programs with the most all-time wins. Michigan made their twenty-first Rose Bowl appearance, while Alabama appeared for the eighth time.

The game's scoring began on Alabama's third offensive possession when running back Jase McClellan scored on a 34-yard touchdown rush. The Wolverines tied the game on their next drive on an 8-yard touchdown pass from quarterback J. J. McCarthy to running back Blake Corum. A McCarthy touchdown pass to wide receiver Tyler Morris for 38 yards gave Michigan their first lead with less than four minutes remaining in the first half, and the Wolverines maintained this advantage into halftime. Neither team scored in the third quarter, but Alabama retook the lead thirty seconds into the fourth on a 3-yard rush by McClellan. An Alabama field goal with less than five minutes to play extended their lead to seven points, though a Michigan touchdown by Roman Wilson with ninety-four seconds remaining tied the game and ultimately sent it to overtime. Michigan had possession first in the overtime period and scored a touchdown in two plays. On Alabama's possession, they were ultimately stopped short on fourth and goal from the 3-yard line, giving Michigan a 27–20 victory and a berth in the national championship game.

== Background ==
The Rose Bowl was first played in January 1902, making it the oldest college football bowl game. It was then known as the Tournament East–West Football Game, reflecting its place as an event during the Tournament of Roses Parade. In the first playing, held at Tournament Park in Pasadena, Michigan defeated Stanford, 49–0. The Rose Bowl Stadium was built in 1922 and hosted its first Rose Bowl Game in 1923, which saw USC defeat Penn State. The Rose Bowl was included as part of the Bowl Championship Series (BCS) upon its installation in 1998 and hosted the BCS National Championship Game on four occasions: in 2002, 2006, 2010, and 2014. After the establishment of the College Football Playoff (CFP) beginning with the 2014 season, it hosted CFP semifinal games in 2015 and 2018 prior to the 2024 contest. Additionally, the 2021 Rose Bowl was a CFP semifinal but was played at AT&T Stadium due to COVID-19 restrictions.

Prior to the game, Cliff Montgomery, Kirk Herbstreit, and Lincoln Kennedy were inducted into the Rose Bowl Hall of Fame. Former congresswoman Gabby Giffords was the Rose Parade grand marshal.

Rose Bowl Stadium pre-game
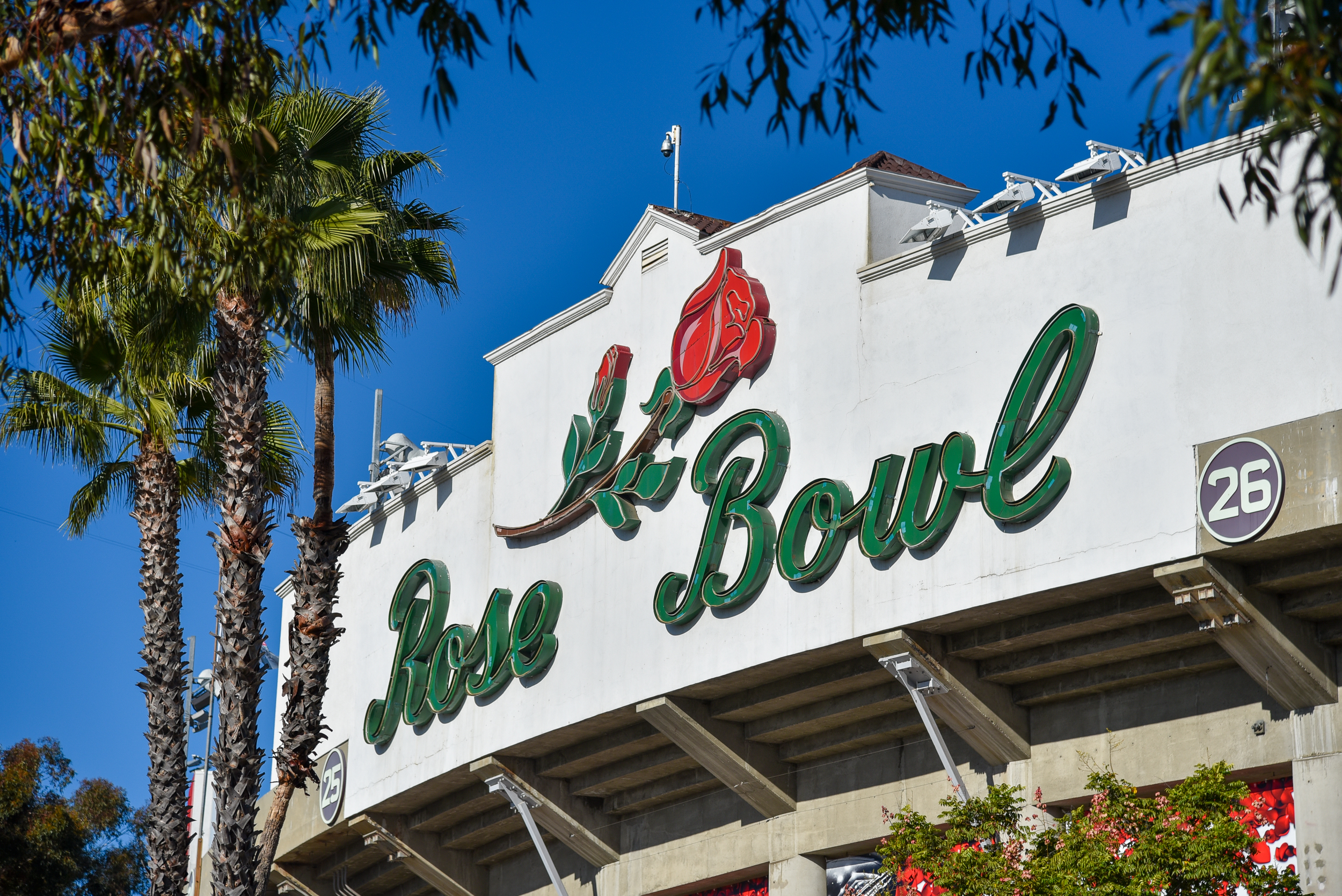
Stadium exterior

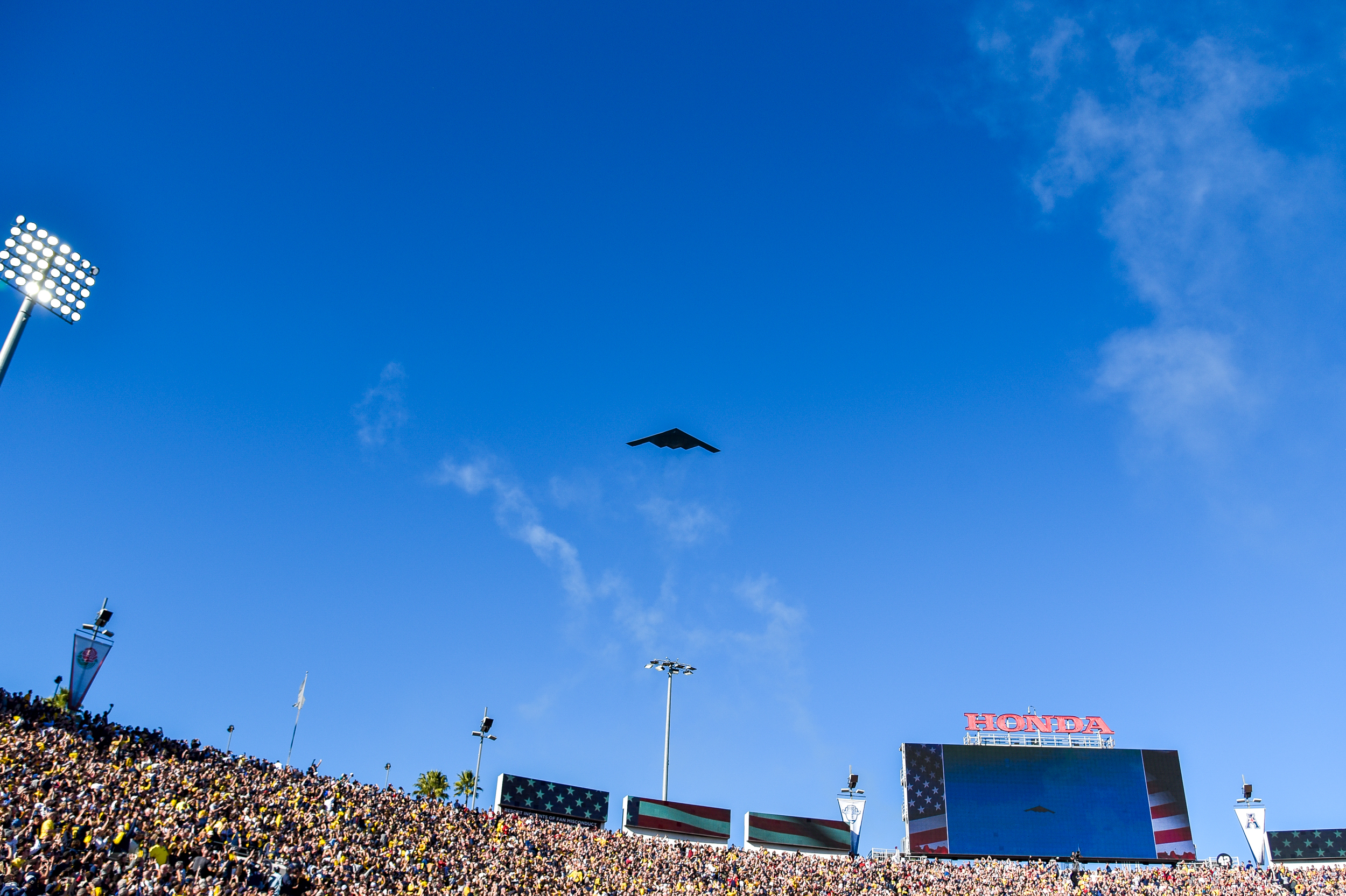
Northrop B-2 Spirit flyover

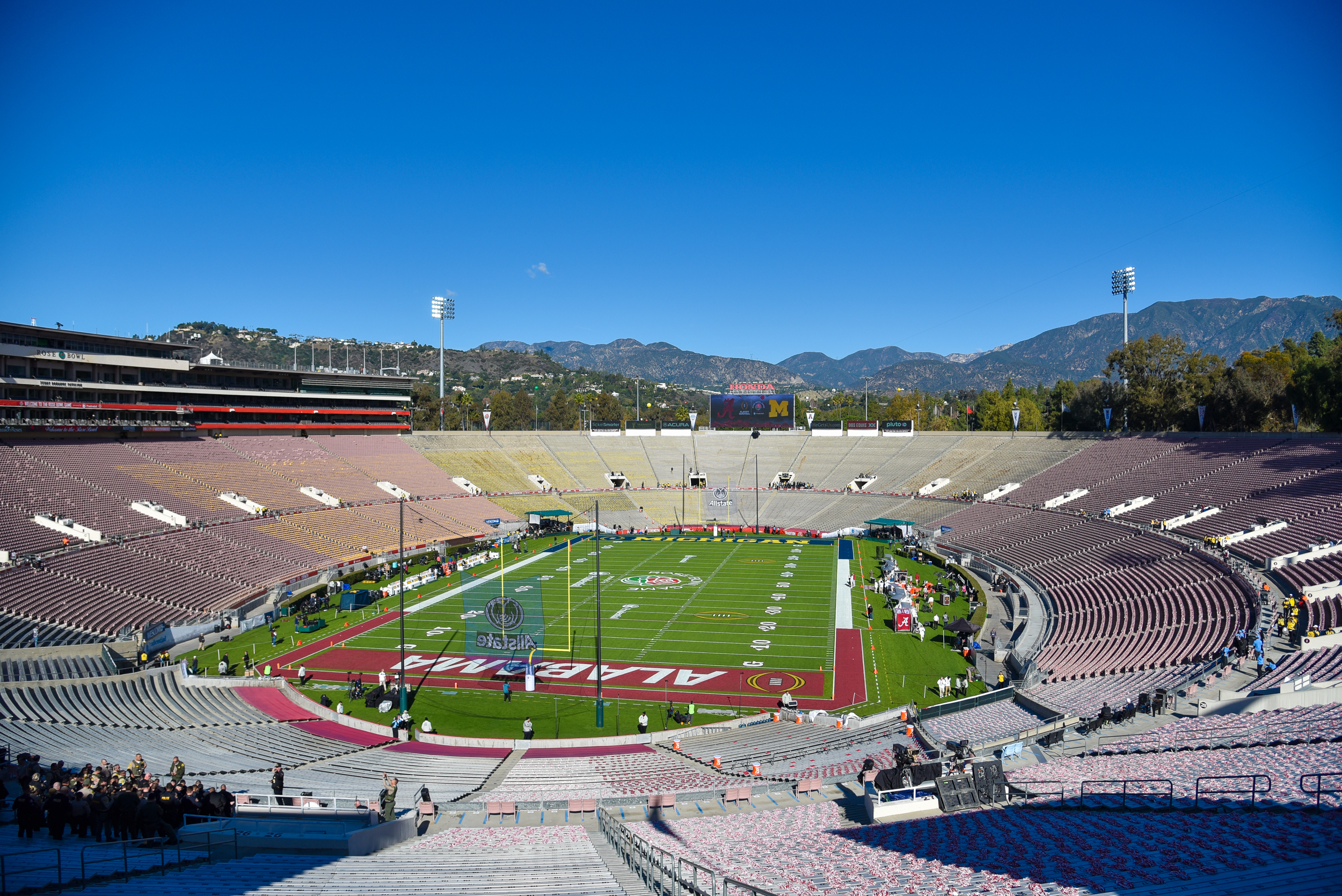
South end zone view

=== College Football Playoff ===
The four teams competing in the Playoff were chosen by the CFP selection committee, whose final rankings were released on December 3, 2023. The committee selected No. 1 Michigan of the Big Ten Conference, No. 2 Washington of the Pac-12 Conference, No. 3 Texas of the Big 12 Conference, and No. 4 Alabama of the Southeastern Conference (SEC). Each team was the champion of its respective conference. Michigan and Washington entered the playoff with undefeated 13–0 records while Texas and Alabama entered 12–1.

Semifinals
January 1 – Rose Bowl Rose Bowl Stadium, Pasadena
1 | Michigan (OT) | 27
4 | Alabama | 20
January 1 – Sugar Bowl Caesars Superdome, New Orleans
2 | Washington | 37
3 | Texas | 31

Championship
January 8 – National Championship NRG Stadium, Houston
1 | Michigan | 34
2 | Washington | 13

== Teams ==
The game featured Big Ten champions Michigan and SEC champions Alabama. This was the sixth meeting between the two teams, and Alabama entered with a 3–2 lead in the overall series. Their most recent meeting was in the 2020 Citrus Bowl, in which Alabama defeated Michigan 35–16. Four of the teams' other meetings took place in the postseason, the first being a Michigan victory in the 1988 Hall of Fame Bowl. The teams entered the game as the two college football programs with the most all-time wins, with Michigan at 1,002 wins and Alabama at 965.

This was Michigan's 21st appearance in the Rose Bowl—they were 8–12 in prior editions. They lost their previous three Rose Bowl appearances, in 2004, 2005, and 2007. Their last Rose Bowl win came in 1998, when they defeated Washington State 21–16 to win the national championship. Alabama, meanwhile, made their eighth Rose Bowl appearance, with a 5–1–1 record in previous games. Their last appearance came in 2021 in a win over Notre Dame, and the Tide's last national championship was won the next game over Ohio State.

=== Michigan ===
Michigan finished the regular season with a perfect 12–0 record, having concluded their Big Ten schedule with a rivalry win over Ohio State, 30–24. As Ohio State also entered the game undefeated, the Big Ten Conference East Division championship was on the line, and Michigan's win and subsequent division title earned them a berth to the 2023 Big Ten Football Championship Game against the West Division champion Iowa. They defeated Iowa in a 26–0 shutout to claim their third consecutive conference championship; the Associated Press said that Iowa "never had a chance" in the game and remarked that Michigan was likely to claim the No. 1 seed in the playoff, which they ultimately did. The Iowa win gave Michigan a 13–0 record entering the Rose Bowl.

The game was played during an ongoing investigation into allegations of sign-stealing by Michigan Wolverines staff members. The scandal was a major headline for the team throughout the season; it centered around an allegation and subsequent investigations by the NCAA and Big Ten as to whether Michigan violated an NCAA bylaw regarding the scouting of future opponents. Connor Stalions, a Michigan football staffer, was cited by allegations as having attended more than 35 games to scout future opponents. Head coach Jim Harbaugh, who denied knowledge of the scouting, was suspended by the Big Ten for the team's last three regular season games against Penn State, Maryland, and Ohio State. He had previously served a suspension for the team's first three games of the season, against East Carolina, UNLV, and Bowling Green, as the result of a self-imposed sanction regarding recruiting violations.

=== Alabama ===
Alabama went 11–1 in the regular season, with their only loss coming to Texas on September 9 by a score of 34–24. They finished the season with a defeat of Auburn in the annual Iron Bowl rivalry game; this win came by way of a 31-yard touchdown pass on 4th & Goal. Their 8–0 conference record gave them the SEC West Division championship and a berth in the 2023 SEC Championship Game, where they faced No. 1 Georgia. In the game, Alabama defeated the two-time defending national champions, 27–24, ending their 29-game winning streak.

== Game summary ==
The game's officiating crew, representing the Big 12 Conference, was led by referee Michael Vandervelde. The game, which took place on January 1, 2024, was scheduled to begin at 2:00 p.m. local PST, though its actual start time was 2:11 p.m. Michigan entered as slim favorites to win the game, and the point spread was set at 1.5 points with an over–under of 44.5 points. The game was broadcast on ESPN, with play-by-play commentary from Chris Fowler, analysis from Kirk Herbstreit, and sideline reporting from Holly Rowe and Laura Rutledge. The ESPN Radio broadcast featured Joe Tessitore on play-by-play, with analysis from Dusty Dvoracek and sideline reporting from Quint Kessenich. ESPN also offered Field Pass with the Pat McAfee Show on ESPN2 and Command Center on ESPNU, as well as a Spanish-language ESPN Deportes broadcast with commentary from Eduardo Varela and Pablo Viruega. The Michigan Sports Network radio feed featured commentary from Doug Karsch, Jon Jansen, and Jason Avant, and the Crimson Tide Sports Network broadcast featured Chris Stewart, Tyler Watts, and Roger Hoover.

The pregame coin toss was won by Alabama, who deferred their choice to the second half, thereby giving Michigan possession of the ball to begin the game.

=== First half ===
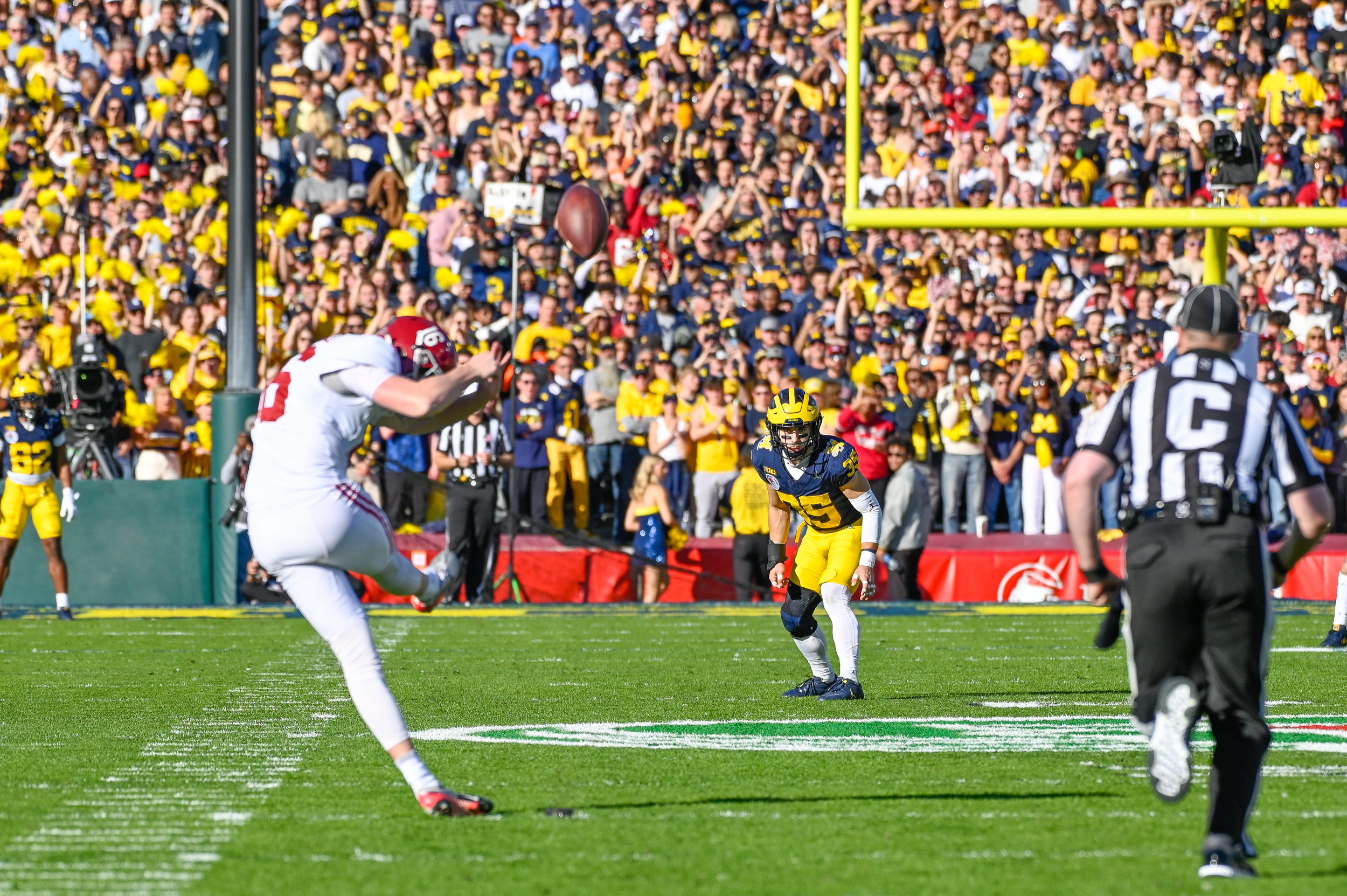
Will Reichard kicks off for Alabama to start the game

The game began with Alabama placekicker Will Reichard's opening kickoff, which landed in the end zone and therefore resulted in a touchback, giving Michigan possession of the ball on the Alabama 25-yard line. On the game's first play, Michigan quarterback J. J. McCarthy threw a pass which was initially ruled on the field to have been intercepted by Alabama safety Caleb Downs. The play went to replay review, where it was determined that Downs was out-of-bounds when he caught the ball, meaning the result of the play was an incomplete pass. The next two plays netted two yards for the Wolverines, whose drive ended with a three-and-out and a punt by Tommy Doman on the next play. Alabama's first drive ended similarly, with two quarterback sacks in three plays by the Michigan defense contributing to an Alabama three-and-out and punt. James Burnip's kick was muffed by Semaj Morgan and recovered for Alabama by Quandarrius Robinson at the Michigan 44-yard line, giving Alabama possession again. On this drive, Alabama scored on their fourth play when running back Jase McClellan rushed for a 34-yard touchdown, and Reichard's extra point was successful, giving Alabama a 7–0 lead. Michigan tied the game on their second drive, which included gains of 21 and 19 yards by Blake Corum and Kalel Mullings, respectively, and ended with an 8-yard touchdown pass from McCarthy to Corum. The Wolverines regained possession of the ball following an Alabama three-and-out and advanced the ball to their own 31-yard line before the end of the first quarter.

The second quarter began with a Michigan 3rd & 9 which the Wolverines were unable to convert. The game's next three drives—two for Alabama and one for Michigan—all resulted in three-and-outs after net gains of no more than four yards. After the last of these punts was downed at the Michigan 17-yard line, the Wolverines gained possession of the ball and were able to gain three first downs in five plays to reach midfield. After two plays with no yardage gained, McCarthy passed to Tyler Morris for a 38-yard touchdown, giving Michigan their first lead of the game. The ensuing extra point attempt was unsuccessful, keeping Michigan's lead to six points. Doman's kickoff that followed was returned by Kendrick Law to the Alabama 16-yard line, giving the Crimson Tide the ball with 3:44 remaining in the first half. The Tide reached Michigan territory in three plays and shortly after faced 3rd & 3 at the Michigan 25-yard line with 28 seconds left. On that play, Alabama quarterback Jalen Milroe was sacked for a loss of 7 yards. On the ensuing fourth down, Reichard made a 50-yard field goal to pull the Crimson Tide within three points. The final play of the second quarter was a quarterback kneel by Michigan and the Wolverines entered halftime with a 13–10 lead.

=== Second half ===
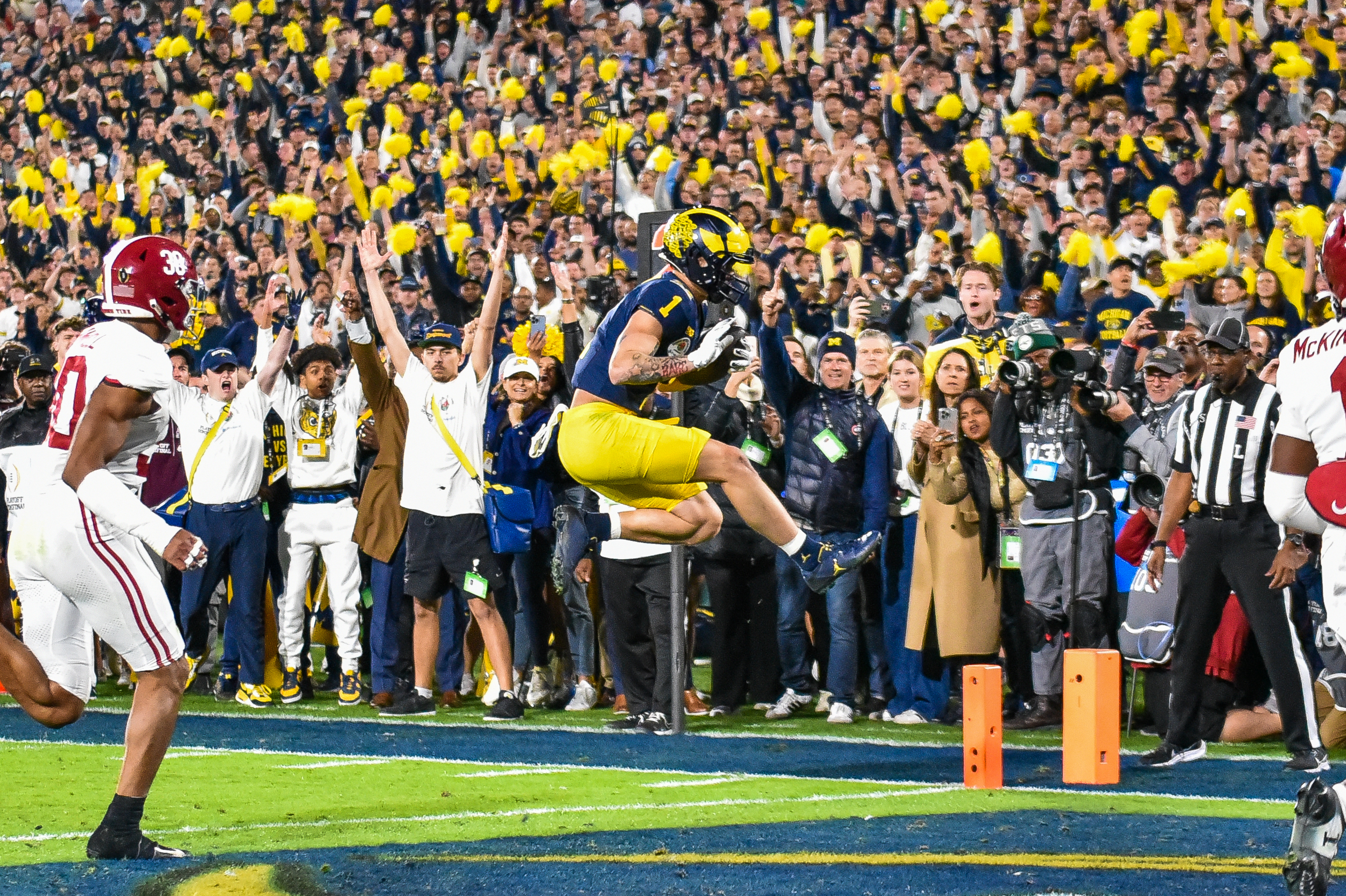
Roman Wilson scores a fourth-quarter touchdown to bring Michigan within one point

Alabama had possession of the ball first in the second half and started their drive on their own 14-yard line following a kickoff return by Law. Their first six plays saw them gain three first downs and reach the Michigan 47-yard line, but a fumble by Milroe on the snap set them back thirteen yards and they punted several plays later. Michigan converted 3rd & 9 on their following drive with a 12-yard pass from McCarthy to Cornelius Johnson, though they gained only eight yards on their next three plays and punted on fourth down. The teams then traded three-and-outs and Alabama began their third drive of the quarter with under four minutes remaining and the ball on their own 45-yard line. They entered Michigan territory with a Milroe rush on their first play and were in the red zone after five plays. A Milroe rush for no gain at the Michigan 16-yard line concluded the third quarter with the score still 13–10 in favor of the Wolverines.

Milroe began the fourth quarter with an 18-yard rush, which was immediately followed by a 3-yard touchdown rush by McClellan, giving Alabama the lead. Michigan went three-and-out again afterwards, though the Crimson Tide's next drive was cut short by a fumble on its second play, recovered by Michigan's Josh Wallace. McCarthy passed to Roman Wilson for a 20-yard gain on the Wolverines' first play, though they did not gain another first down and attempted a 49-yard field goal on fourth down, which was unsuccessful after Turner missed it to the left. Alabama, taking possession at their own 31-yard line, extended their lead as the result of a nine-play drive which saw several first downs gained on rushing plays. It ended with a 52-yard Reichard field goal, leaving just over five minutes on the clock. Michigan began their next drive following a touchback and gained eight yards in three plays, leaving them with 4th & 2 on their own 33-yard line. On the play, McCarthy passed to Corum for a gain of 27 yards, giving Michigan a first down at the 50-yard line. The Wolverines reached the red zone after consecutive gains of 16 and 29 yards immediately afterwards, and a McCarthy-to-Wilson touchdown pass two plays later brought Michigan within one point. The extra point by Turner was good, tying the game at 20 points apiece with 94 seconds left in regulation. Alabama ended their next drive with a punt, though the kick was muffed at the Michigan 6-yard line by Jake Thaw; he ultimately recovered the ball at the 1-yard line. Michigan took a knee to run the remaining seconds off of the clock and send the game to overtime.

=== Overtime ===
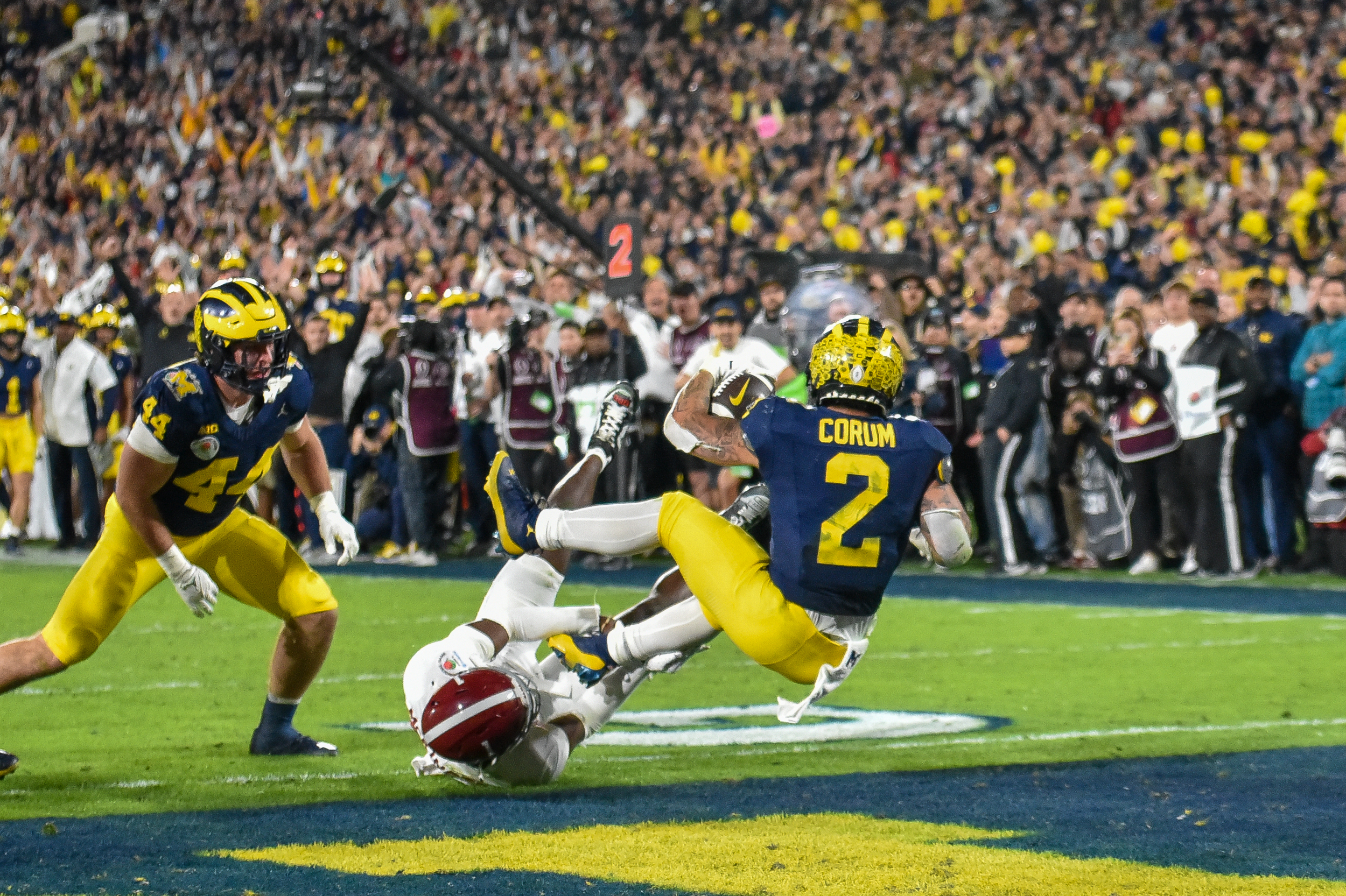
Blake Corum scores a touchdown for Michigan in overtime

Another coin toss was performed before the start of the overtime period, which was won by Alabama. They opted to play on defense first, giving Michigan the first overtime possession.

The Wolverines opened overtime with an 8-yard rush by Blake Corum, which was immediately followed by a 17-yard Corum touchdown rush and a successful extra point attempt by James Turner. Alabama began their overtime possession with a 15-yard rush by Milroe on the second play, though they soon faced 3rd & Goal on the 14-yard line following rushes for no gain and a 5-yard loss by McClellan. On third down, Milroe passed to Jermaine Burton for an 11-yard gain, setting up 4th & Goal on the 3-yard line. Alabama ran a quarterback keeper with Milroe, which failed when he was stopped for a 1-yard gain by Josiah Stewart, ending the game and giving Michigan a 27–20 victory.

=== Scoring summary ===
College Football Playoff Semifinal at the 2024 Rose Bowl Game

| Quarter | 1 | 2 | 3 | 4 | OT | Total |
|---|---|---|---|---|---|---|
| No. 4 Alabama | 7 | 3 | 0 | 10 | 0 | 20 |
| No. 1 Michigan | 7 | 6 | 0 | 7 | 7 | 27 |

at the Rose Bowl • Pasadena, California

- Date: January 1, 2024
- Game time: 2:00 p.m. PST
- Game weather: Sunny • Temperature: 64 °F (18 °C) • Wind: 2 mph (3.2 km/h) north
- Game attendance: 96,371
- Referee: Michael Vandervelde
- TV announcers (ESPN): Chris Fowler (play-by-play), Kirk Herbstreit (color), Holly Rowe and Laura Rutledge (sidelines)
- Box score

Scoring summary

| Quarter | Time | Drive | | | Team | Scoring information | Score | |
| Quarter | Time | Plays | Yards | TOP | Team | Scoring information | Alabama | Michigan |
|---|---|---|---|---|---|---|---|---|
| 1 | 9:41 | 4 | 44 | 2:11 | Alabama | Jase McClellan 34-yard touchdown run, Will Reichard kick good | 7 | 0 |
| 1 | 4:23 | 10 | 75 | 5:18 | Michigan | Blake Corum 8-yard touchdown reception from J. J. McCarthy, James Turner kick good | 7 | 7 |
| 2 | 3:49 | 8 | 83 | 4:37 | Michigan | Tyler Morris 38-yard touchdown reception from J. J. McCarthy, kick failed | 7 | 13 |
| 2 | 0:07 | 10 | 52 | 3:42 | Alabama | 50-yard field goal by Will Reichard | 10 | 13 |
| 4 | 14:30 | 8 | 55 | 4:14 | Alabama | Jase McClellan 3-yard touchdown run, Will Reichard kick good | 17 | 13 |
| 4 | 4:41 | 9 | 35 | 5:49 | Alabama | 52-yard field goal by Will Reichard | 20 | 13 |
| 4 | 1:34 | 8 | 75 | 3:07 | Michigan | Roman Wilson 4-yard touchdown reception from J. J. McCarthy, James Turner kick good | 20 | 20 |
| OT | | 2 | 25 | | Michigan | Blake Corum 17-yard touchdown run, James Turner kick good | 20 | 27 |
| "TOP" = time of possession. For other American football terms, see Glossary of American football. | | | | | | | 20 | 27 |

== Statistics ==
Team statistical comparison
| Statistic | Alabama | Michigan |
|---|---|---|
| First downs | 17 | 15 |
| First downs rushing | 13 | 5 |
| First downs passing | 4 | 10 |
| First downs penalty | 0 | 0 |
| Third down efficiency | 3–13 | 2–11 |
| Fourth down efficiency | 0–1 | 2–2 |
| Total plays–net yards | 66–288 | 59–351 |
| Rushing attempts–net yards | 43–172 | 32–130 |
| Yards per rush | 4.0 | 4.1 |
| Yards passing | 116 | 221 |
| Pass completions–attempts | 16–23 | 17–27 |
| Interceptions thrown | 0 | 0 |
| Punt returns–total yards | 1–0 | 3–9 |
| Kickoff returns–total yards | 5–325 | 4–256 |
| Punts–average yardage | 7–50.3 | 6–39.5 |
| Fumbles–lost | 5–1 | 3–1 |
| Penalties–yards | 3–15 | 2–25 |
| Time of possession | 32:19 | 27:41 |

Alabama statistics
Crimson Tide passing
| | C–A | Yds | TD–INT |
|---|---|---|---|
| Jalen Milroe | 16–23 | 116 | 0–0 |
Crimson Tide rushing
| | Car | Yds | TD |
| Jase McClellan | 14 | 87 | 2 |
| Jalen Milroe | 21 | 63 | 0 |
| Justice Haynes | 4 | 31 | 0 |
| Jam Miller | 1 | 11 | 0 |
| Roydell Williams | 1 | −1 | 0 |
| TEAM | 2 | −19 | 0 |
Crimson Tide receiving
| | Rec | Yds | TD |
| Isaiah Bond | 4 | 47 | 0 |
| Jermaine Burton | 4 | 21 | 0 |
| CJ Dippre | 2 | 15 | 0 |
| Kobe Prentice | 1 | 13 | 0 |
| Jase McClellan | 2 | 11 | 0 |
| Amari Niblack | 1 | 6 | 0 |
| Jam Miller | 1 | 2 | 0 |
| Kendrick Law | 1 | 1 | 0 |

Michigan statistics
Wolverines passing
| | C–A | Yds | TD–INT |
|---|---|---|---|
| J. J. McCarthy | 17–27 | 221 | 3–0 |
Wolverines rushing
| | Car | Yds | TD |
| Blake Corum | 19 | 83 | 1 |
| J. J. McCarthy | 3 | 25 | 0 |
| Donovan Edwards | 4 | 11 | 0 |
| Kalel Mullings | 1 | 6 | 0 |
| Semaj Morgan | 1 | 6 | 0 |
| Alex Orji | 2 | 2 | 0 |
| TEAM | 2 | −3 | 0 |
Wolverines receiving
| | Rec | Yds | TD |
| Roman Wilson | 4 | 73 | 1 |
| Tyler Morris | 2 | 45 | 1 |
| Blake Corum | 2 | 35 | 1 |
| Semaj Morgan | 4 | 24 | 0 |
| Kalel Mullings | 1 | 19 | 0 |
| Colston Loveland | 2 | 13 | 0 |
| Cornelius Johnson | 2 | 12 | 0 |

== Aftermath ==
The win improved Michigan's record to 14–0 and gave them a berth to the 2024 College Football Playoff National Championship, where they faced Sugar Bowl champions Washington. They would eventually defeat Washington 34–13. Alabama's record fell to 12–2 and the Tide's season concluded upon the loss. Michigan quarterback J. J. McCarthy and defensive tackle Mason Graham were named the game's most valuable players.

The ESPN broadcast of the game drew 27.2 million viewers, the highest viewing audience for any CFP semifinal since the 2015 Sugar Bowl, during the CFP's first year. It ranked in the top ten audiences for cable telecasts all-time and was the highest for any sporting event, apart from the National Football League, since 2018. The peak audience of 32.8 million viewers was the most for any CFP semifinal game. The game was the most-viewed Rose Bowl since 2015, also a CFP semifinal, which had 28.2 million viewers.

The game was the second in Rose Bowl history to reach overtime. The first was the 2018 edition, when Georgia defeated Oklahoma in double-overtime; that game was also a CFP semifinal.

This game was the last for Nick Saban as the Alabama head coach, as he retired on January 10, 2024, after seventeen years in the position.

The game marked the 70th consecutive Rose Bowl played in Pasadena to be attended by San Francisco-based sports columnist Art Spander.

Post-game and celebrations
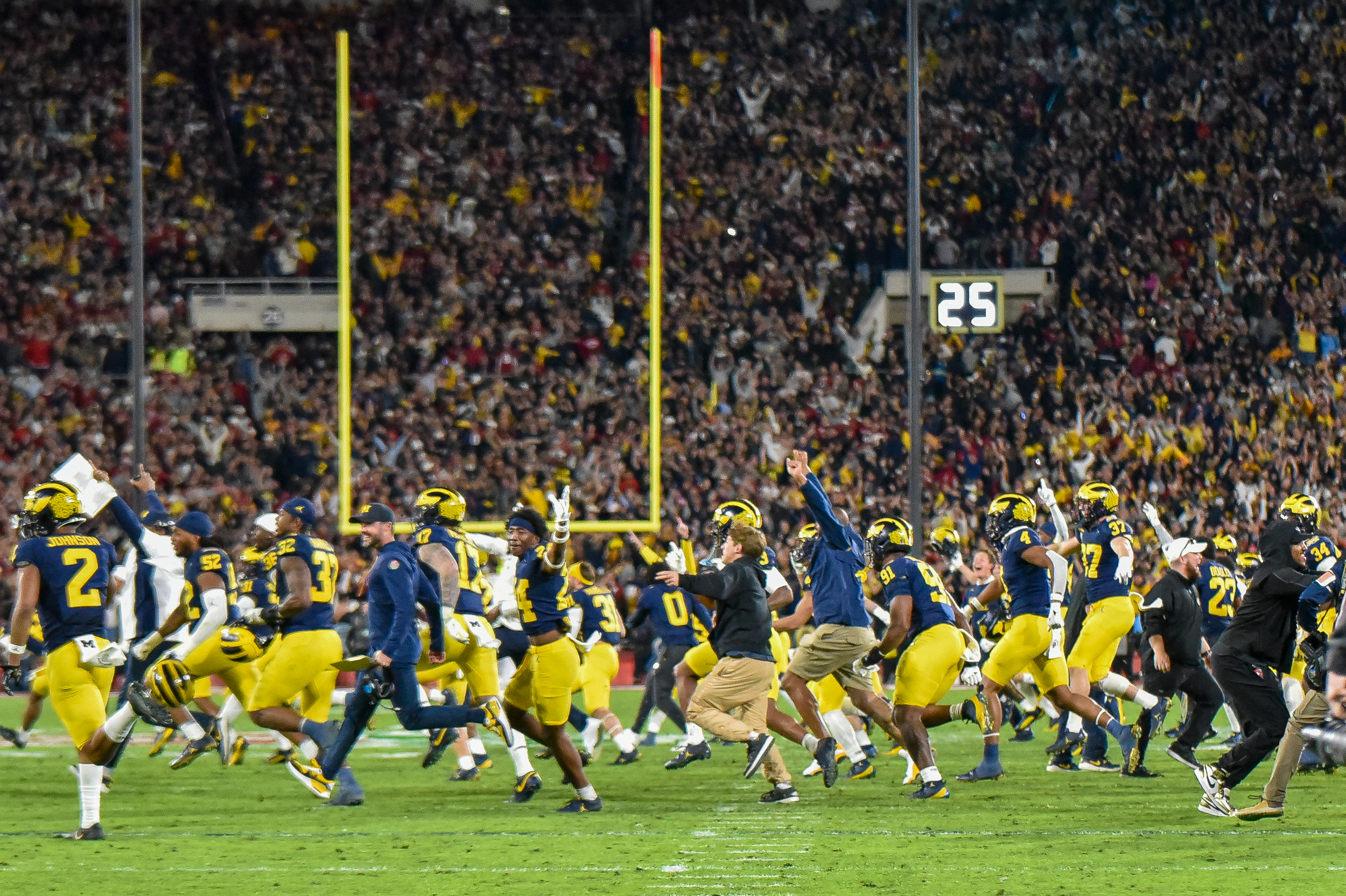
Michigan players and coaches celebrating

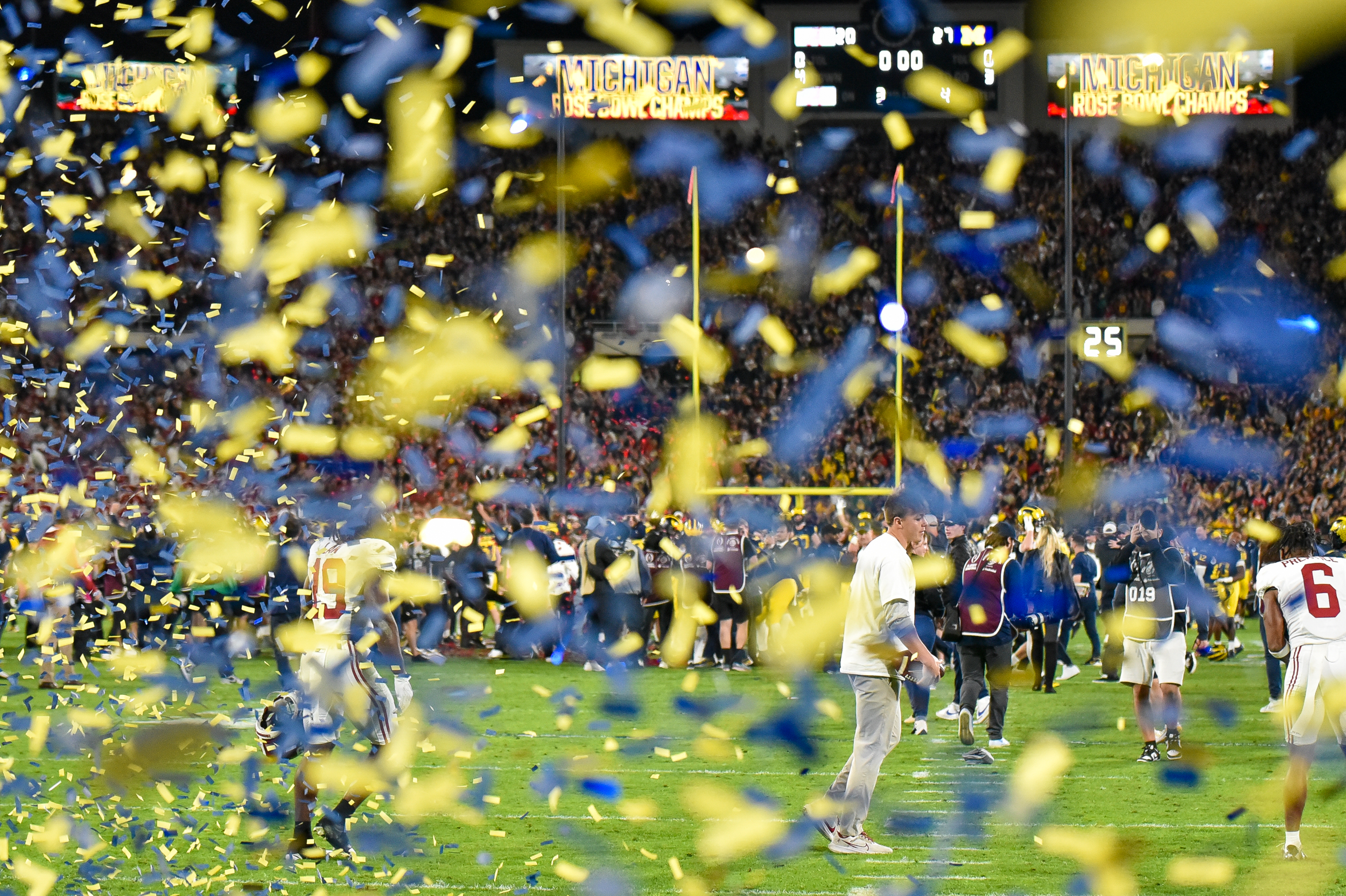
Confetti and on-field celebrations

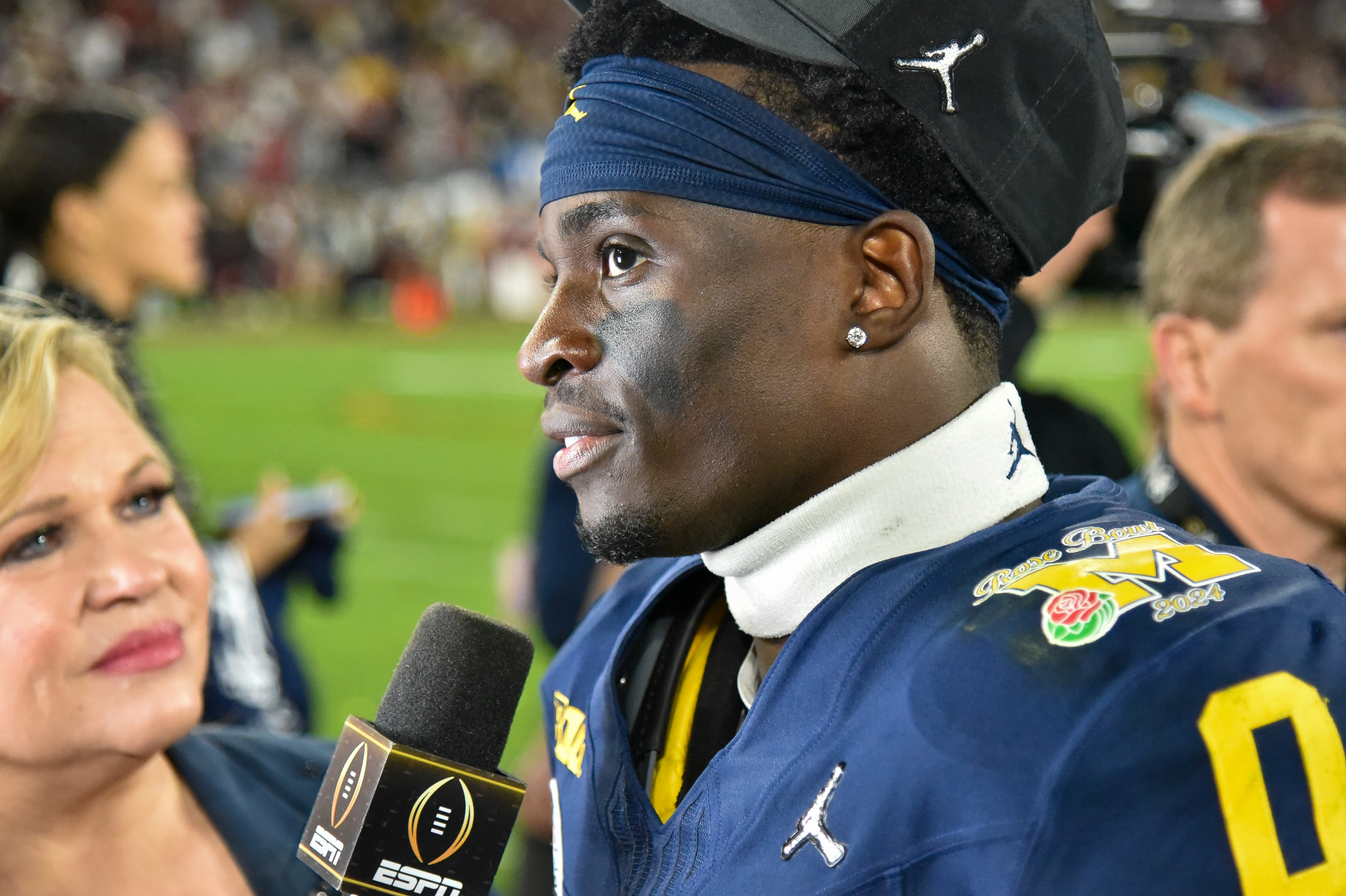
Mike Sainristil in a post-game interview with Holly Rowe

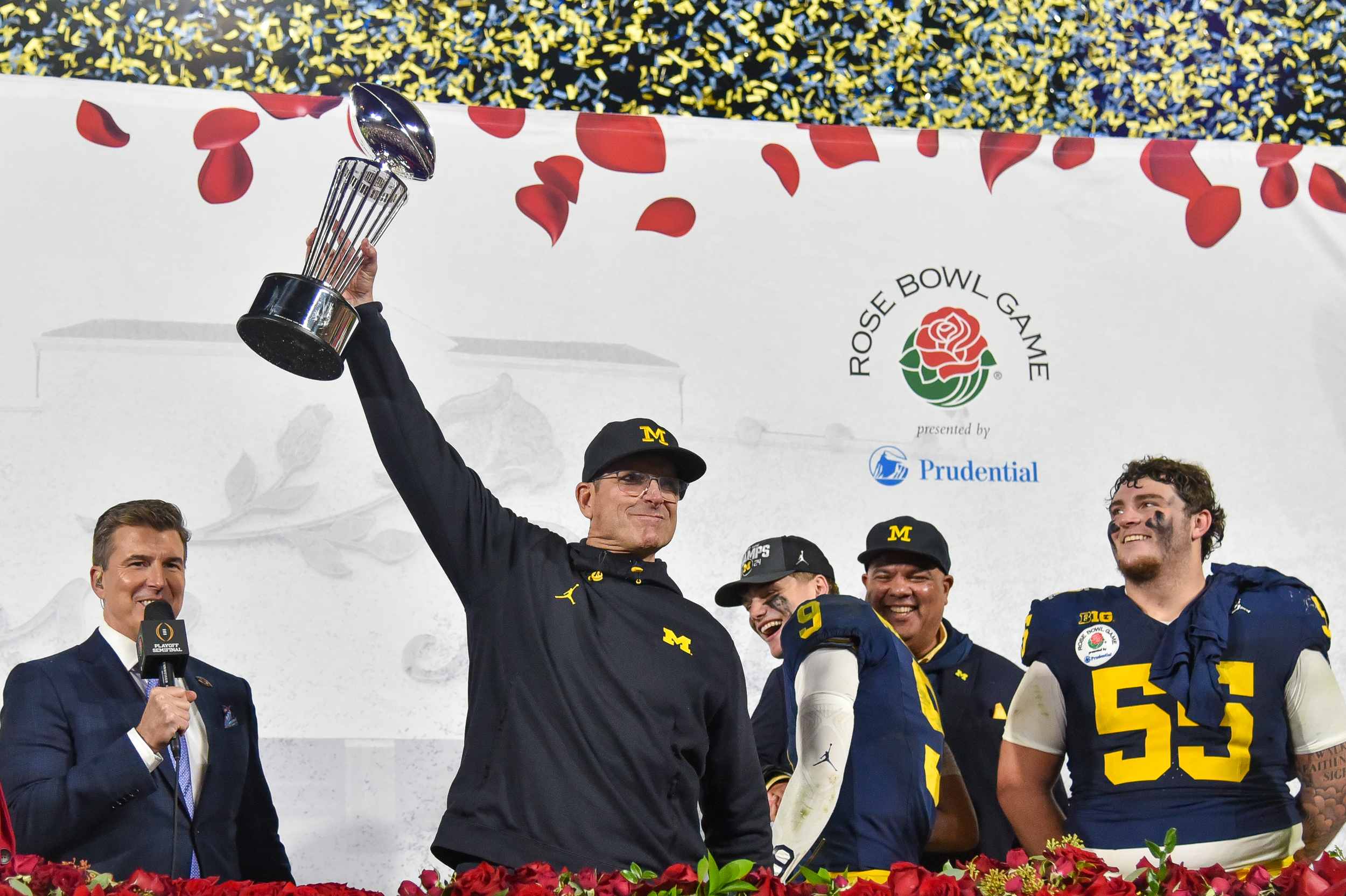
Head coach Jim Harbaugh with the Rose Bowl trophy
