= Chris Partridge =

American football player and coach (born 1980)

Seattle Seahawks
- Title: Defensive run game coordinator

Personal information
- Born: November 3, 1980 (age 46); Hackensack, New Jersey, U.S.

Career information
- College: Lafayette
- NFL draft: 2003: undrafted

Career history
- Paramus Catholic HS (NJ) (2003–2004) Assistant head coach, defensive coordinator & wide receivers coach; Lafayette (2005) Defensive backs coach & special teams coordinator; The Citadel (2006–2007) Defensive line coach & special teams coordinator; Paramus Catholic HS (NJ) (2010–2014) Head coach; Michigan (2015–2019); Director of player personnel (2015); Linebackers coach & special teams coordinator (2016–2017); Safeties coach & special teams coordinator (2018–2019); Ole Miss (2020–2022) Co-defensive coordinator & safeties coach; Michigan (2023) Linebackers coach; Seattle Seahawks (2024–present); Outside linebackers coach 2024–2025); Defensive run game coordinator (2026–present)

Awards and highlights
- Super Bowl champion (LX)

Chris Partridge (born November 3, 1980) is an American professional football coach and former player who is currently the outside linebackers coach for the Seattle Seahawks of the National Football League (NFL). He also was the Paramus Catholic High School head coach and worked as an assistant coach for Michigan Wolverines football from 2016 to 2020 and the defensive coordinator for Ole Miss from 2020 to 2022.

== Coaching career ==
=== Paramus Catholic High School ===
Partridge was the head coach of his alma mater, Paramus Catholic High School, a position he held for five seasons (2010–2014). While at the helm of the Paladin program, Partridge grew a football program listed 4,250th nationally and 112th in the state of New Jersey to the top-ranked team in the state and No. 4 nationally by USA Today. He coached and mentored more than 30 Division I football players during that time, as well as various All-American players including Jabrill Peppers.

=== Michigan ===
Partridge was hired by Michigan in January 2015 as the Director of Player Personnel. On December 3, 2015, it was announced that Partridge would coach the linebackers for Michigan during the 2016 Citrus Bowl, after the departure of Michigan defensive coordinator and linebackers coach D. J. Durkin, who left to be the head coach at Maryland. Partridge then took over as full time linebackers coach and helped with the special teams. On February 8, 2017, Partridge was promoted to Special Teams Coordinator and continued as linebackers coach. Before the 2018 season, Partridge was offered to join the Alabama Crimson Tide football staff, but chose to stay at Michigan. Weeks after, Partridge received a significant pay raise and new coaching duties. Partridge was assigned to coach safeties and continue as special teams coordinator, Al Washington took over as linebackers coach.

=== Ole Miss ===
On January 2, 2020, Partridge was hired by Ole Miss and new head coach Lane Kiffin. Later, Partridge was named co-defensive coordinator alongside former Michigan assistant DJ Durkin. In 2022, he was promoted to play caller while still being co-defensive coordinator with new hire Maurice Crum Jr.

=== Michigan (second stint) ===
Partridge returned to Michigan's football staff for the 2023 season, but was fired on November 17, 2023. Partridge was accused of participating in the destruction of evidence regarding the University of Michigan football sign-stealing scandal, but was later cleared of wrongdoing by the NCAA once the investigation concluded. After being cleared of the allegations, Partridge filed a wrongful termination lawsuit against the University of Michigan in March 2026.

=== Seattle Seahawks ===
On February 22, 2024, Partridge by the Seattle Seahawks as their outside linebackers coach under new head coach, Mike Macdonald. He was part of the coaching staff that won Super Bowl LX over the New England Patriots with a score of 29–13.
