= University of Michigan football sign-stealing scandal =

2023 American college football scandal

In 2023, the National Collegiate Athletic Association (NCAA) opened an investigation into sign stealing accusations against staff members of the Michigan Wolverines football team. According to a decision released by a Division I Committee on Infractions panel, the Michigan football program was found to commit violations over three seasons involving an off-campus, in-person scouting scheme, impermissible recruiting, head coach responsibility, failure to cooperate, and failure to monitor. The Michigan football program was fined one of the largest financial penalties in college football history, expected to exceed $20 million in revenue. They also received four years' probation, and the panel noted that "the true scope and scale of the scheme — including the competitive advantage it conferred—will never be known due to individuals' intentional destruction and withholding of materials and information."

== Background ==
The Michigan investigation specifically centers on NCAA Bylaw 11.6.1, which states "Off-campus, in-person scouting of future opponents (in the same season) is prohibited, except as provided in Bylaws 11.6.1.1 and 11.6.1.2", with neither exception applying in Michigan's situation. Sign stealing generally refers to the practice of covertly identifying the hand signals used by opposition coaches to instruct their players during a game. For most of the history of college football, sign stealing was not an issue. Traditionally, teams would huddle between snaps, with plays frequently sent in by player substitution. However, with the increasing emphasis on no-huddle offenses in the 21st century, signaling plays from the sideline became necessary, prompting teams to attempt to steal opponents' signs. The NCAA alleges that Michigan staffer Connor Stalions sent friends and family to opponent's games to record future opponents' signs.

The NCAA has never directly banned sign stealing in football, but does ban teams from using electronic equipment to record opponents' signals during its own game. Bylaw 11.6.1.1 states that an institutional staff member cannot in-person advance scout a common opponent in the same season. The case is still pending.

Unlike the NFL, the NCAA prohibited the use of coach-to-player audio technology (except in bowl games), also due to differing program resources. In 2024, the rule changed to allow coach-to-player communication with one player on each side of the ball. It is commonly believed to have ended the need to signal, however that is not the case. Visible signals are not necessary because of coach-to-player communication or the lack thereof. Teams have always had the option to huddle and utilize wristbands without needing coach-to-player communication. Visible signals are necessary for tempo or an offense or defense. Even after the rule change, many teams still signal their play offensively, forcing the defense to do the same (preventing them from huddling). It is common practice in college football for teams to still signal and therefore steal opponent signals. And it is also believed that the helmet communication is now being used to communicate opponent signals with players.

== The scandal ==
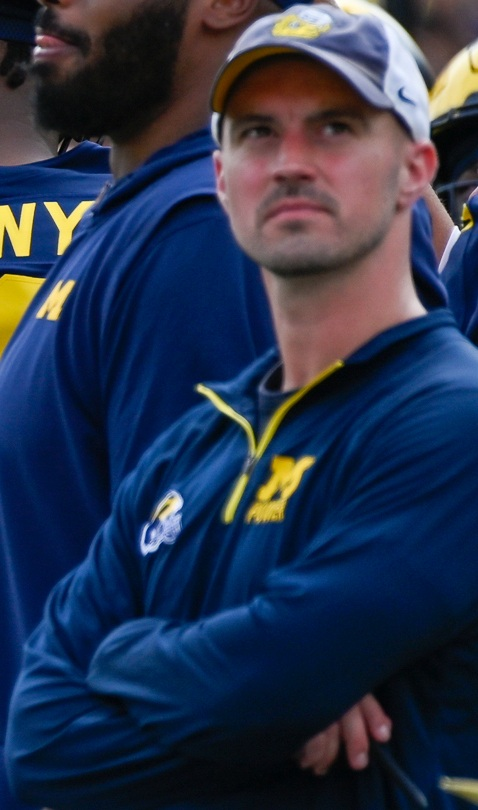
Michigan staffer Connor Stalions, who resigned in light of the scandal.

The scope of the University of Michigan's sign-stealing operation included both video evidence of electronics prohibited by the NCAA to steal signs and a significant paper trail, per sources. Michigan staffer Connor Stalions purchased tickets in his own name for more than 30 games over three years at 11 different Big Ten schools. The NCAA revealed that Stalions referred to this group as the "KGB", and the scheme had scouted at least 13 future opponents over 52 contests. In a recorded call, Stalions referred to sideline footage obtained as "dirty film".

On November 3, 2023, Stalions, who was at the center of the scandal, resigned. However, the investigation continued. That week, Central Michigan University, a Mid-American Conference program, became a party to the investigation against the Wolverines, when evidence emerged of off-campus scouting violations, as Stalions himself was photographed in disguise on the sidelines for a game Central Michigan played against Michigan State on September 1, 2023. A former staffer stated that Stalions was there to both decipher Michigan State's signals and help with play-calling. When asked by NCAA investigators if he attended the MSU-CMU game, Connor stated that he "did not recall" attending a specific game. Central Michigan removed their QB coach, a former Harbaugh assistant, and continues to cooperate with the NCAA investigation without comment. Later reporting showed that in April 2023, Stalions sent a note to Sherrone Moore that Central Michigan assistant coach Jake Kostner planned to visit the facility to meet with Moore.

Michigan has received the official Notice of Allegations from the NCAA. Stalions, Denard Robinson, former assistant coach Chris Partridge and former head coach Jim Harbaugh were alleged to have committed Level I violations. Even though the NOA did not provide any evidence that Harbaugh knew of or was involved with Stalions’ operation, it stated that Harbaugh failed to monitor for “red flags”, and faces a potential punishment regardless. The school also faces Level I charges for a "pattern of noncompliance," according to the previously leaked draft notice.

Reporting on Michigan's response to the Notice of Allegations contains further detail. Per the university, UM admitted to at least one game attended by Stalions and eight more by Michigan staffers. Michigan also confirmed that Stalions traded opponents’ signal plans with other schools and received signal plans for opponents, including Michigan State and UNLV. In response to the NCAA allegation that “at least two members of the football program raised concerns about Stalions' process for deciphering opponents' signals,” it was noted that Partridge told Stalions directly “You’re not using this kid in your signal organization stupid thing, so, like, just have him be a manager.” Per the NCAA, “The information was not reported to compliance for further review and/or willfully ignored so as to not learn about the potential violations.”

== Investigation and impact ==
On November 3, 2023, Stalions resigned as a member of the University of Michigan's staff amid the investigation. In his letter of resignation, Stalions stated that neither Harbaugh or others on the team were aware of any "improper conduct."

On November 6, 2023, the NCAA reported that they found no direct connection between then-head coach Jim Harbaugh and the illegal sign-stealing done by Stalions. The Big Ten Conference suspended Harbaugh for the final three games of the 2023 season, starting with the game against Penn State on November 11. On November 16, 2023, Harbaugh decided to cancel a planned court hearing and accept his three-game suspension. The same day, it was also revealed that the Big Ten had agreed to end its role in the sign stealing investigation.

On November 17, 2023, Wolverines linebackers coach Chris Partridge was fired for allegedly instructing current members of the football team how to respond to questions relating to the sign-stealing scheme. Partridge later released a statement on Twitter saying that his termination was due to a failure “to abide by the University directive not to discuss an ongoing NCAA investigation with anyone associated with the Michigan Football Program.” It was also revealed that the NCAA investigation was still ongoing.

After Michigan defeated Washington in the CFP National Championship Game, NCAA president Charlie Baker issued a statement that Michigan won the national championship "fair and square." Baker defended his decision to inform the university and the Big Ten during the season that the NCAA was investigating the allegations due to his concern that it may have been impacting the outcome of games. He concluded that "I don't believe at the end of the season it did. And I think that's important. We do have a series of discussions going on with the infractions folks about whether or not we can't do something to speed up the pace of our investigations," Baker said. "Certainly in a case like this, we'd like to be able to move a lot more quickly."

On May 5, 2025, it was revealed that the team's then-head coach Sherrone Moore, who served as an assistant to Harbaugh when the sign stealing incident took place, would be suspended for the third and fourth games of the 2025 Wolverines season as the sign stealing investigation continues. This self-imposed punishment would be reviewed in a Committee on Infractions hearing in June. In August 2025, Stalions, Harbaugh, former assistant director of player personnel Denard Robinson-who had already resigned from the team in May 2024 for a separate, unrelated matter- and Moore were all found to have engaged in conduct which "...ranged from destroying relevant materials to providing false or misleading information during interviews." In December 2025, Moore would be removed from the team as well, though for a separate, unrelated matter.

=== Findings and punishment ===
The NCAA Public Infractions Decision noted that head coach Jim Harbaugh ran a program that was "largely dismissive of rules compliance". Staff members did not welcome compliance activities, with one staffer referring to compliance staff as "true scum of the earth".

Michigan received major financial sanctions along with other penalties. The program was stripped of postseason revenue for the next two seasons, was given a $50,000 fine plus 10% of the football program's budget, as well as a fine equivalent to the 10% cost of scholarships given at the end of the 2025–26 school year. Additionally, Then-head coach Sherrone Moore was given a three-game suspension for the 2025 season, former head coach Jim Harbaugh was given a 10-year show cause for failure to monitor and a lack of cooperation, and Connor Stalions was given an eight-year show cause for his violations. Denard Robinson was given a three-year show-cause order. Michigan was also punished with four years of additional probation.

Former assistant coach Chris Partridge, who was fired for allegedly instructing current members of the football team how to respond to questions relating to the sign-stealing scheme, was cleared of wrongdoing by the NCAA in the investigation. Michigan booster Tim Smith, who was accused of financially supporting Stalions' activities, was also cleared of wrongdoing.

== Reactions ==
=== Initial response from UM football ===
On November 6, 2023, a former employee of a rival Big Ten team linked multiple college football teams to the sign-stealing scandal as well and claimed to the Associated Press that it was his job to steal signs and that he was given details from multiple league schools, allowing him to compile a spreadsheet of play-calling signals used by Michigan. The employee, speaking anonymously, provided documented evidence to back his claim. On November 7, a University of Michigan source alleged to The Athletic that Rutgers, Ohio State and Purdue had stolen Wolverine sign signals and shared them as well, with documented evidence backing this claim. Michigan says Purdue, Ohio State, and Rutgers decoded and shared signs used by Michigan. Evidence was also submitted by Michigan showing that prior to Michigan's victory over Purdue in the 2022 Big Ten championship game, Rutgers shared defensive signals with Purdue, while Ohio State shared offensive signals. Documents also showed evidence of sign stealing for a game one of the teams played against the Wolverines in 2020 as well. A Freedom of Information Act request filed by the Detroit Free Press revealed that Stalions filed no expense reports while employed by the University.

=== Other reactions ===
Reactions to the scandal from opposing fanbases and reporters were mixed. Detroit sports talk radio host Mike Valenti of 97.1 The Ticket’s The Valenti Show With Rico bashed Michigan and considered the scandal to be one of the worst in sports history. Former Oklahoma head coach Bob Stoops heavily criticized Michigan, stating that "If it’s true, oh, absolutely (it is a big deal). That’s ridiculous. Everyone (saying), 'Oh, it happens all the time!' No, it doesn’t. I’ve never heard of that. In all my years of football and every team I’ve ever been on, sure, do we look across the field and if you can see it, that’s your job to do. You know what I’m saying, if I’m able to just in my plain eye look over there and know what they’re doing, I should be doing that. But to video people and to send people to scout and marry up a signal with the play … No, no, no. That’s terrible. It goes against everything we’re about. That’s wrong, if it happened." The Athletic published an article where they surveyed 50 anonymous college football coaches regarding how serious they felt Stalions' actions were, and revealed that on a scale of 1 to 5, almost half of the coaches polled rated it a 5 in terms of seriousness.

Alternatively, Colin Cowherd of Fox Sports called the scandal overblown, stating that "So for the record, everybody — just like cannabis and sports gambling — everybody’s stealing signs, they just do it differently; I do not believe that guy in the TV picture is the difference between Michigan and Ohio State. I think it was a better coach, better planning, and more physicality." Joel Klatt of Fox Sports also defended Michigan, stating that, "I’m not saying that there weren’t rules broken. I’m not saying that it didn’t happen. I think that the more you really know about the sport, the more you know about football, I think you realize the less of an impact this actually had on the games. But the less you know about football (you likely think it had) more (of an) impact. Do you think it had an impact on every single play? Do you think that it had an impact on every single game and that they don’t win unless that’s not necessarily the case? Not necessarily the case." ESPN’s Paul Finebaum did not believe that what Stalions did had a significant impact on the game, saying "I would need evidence to say, 'Okay, because of Connor Stalions and all this, where was the advantage?' I just never saw it. If it was so obvious in one game or two games that they turned? But most of their games were pretty convincing."

In the interview with NCAA officials in the Netflix documentary, Stalions’ lawyer Brad Beckworth alleged that Stalions’ personal and private data was breached by hackers. When Beckworth asked how the NCAA obtained the information about Stalions, the investigators initially provided no comment. The public infractions decision revealed that Stalions had given multiple football interns access to his Google Drive and calendar, never contacted law enforcement, and did not produce any requested documents.

On July 22, 2024, ESPN reported that Netflix would be airing an episode featuring Connor Stalions in its ongoing Untold series called "Sign Stealer". The episode was released on August 27, 2024.

== Accusations of illegally obtained evidence ==
On September 1, 2025, CBS News revealed that a student-athlete named in the findings report lied about his claim that Chris Partridge asked players not to cooperate with investigators and recorded a phone call with Connor Stalions. The student-athlete also took videos from Stalions' personal computer in an unauthorized manner and gave them to an unnamed private investigation firm. The student-athlete source was revealed to be a former player on the team.

== See also ==
- University of Michigan basketball scandal
- WakeyLeaks
- 2015 University of Louisville basketball sex scandal
- University of Southern California athletics scandal
