= Connor Stalions =

American football coach (born 1995)

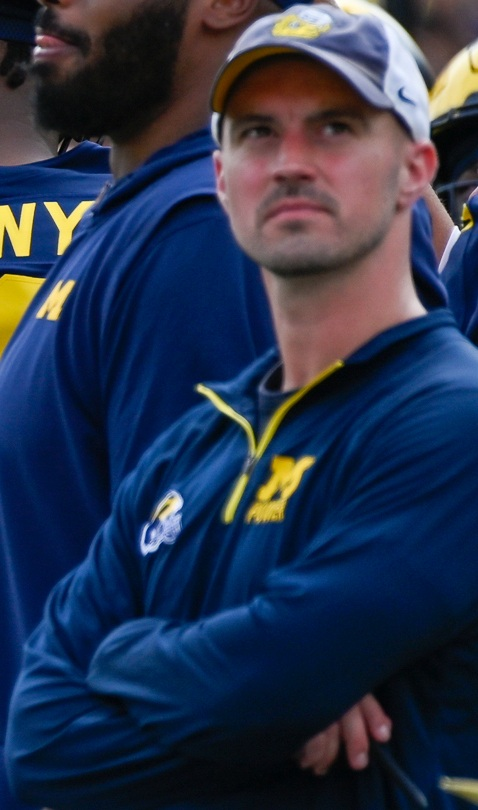

Personal information
- Born: July 27, 1995 (age 31); Houston, Texas, U.S.

Career information
- High school: Lake Orion High School
- College: United States Naval Academy

Career history
- Navy (2013–2017) Student coach; Michigan (2018–2021) Volunteer assistant; Michigan (2022–2023) Defensive analyst; Detroit Mumford High School (2024) Defensive coordinator; Belleville High School (2024) Offensive coordinator

Awards and highlights
- Playing: MHSAA State Champion (2010); Coaching: 2× Big Ten champion (2021–2022); 2x AAC West Division (2015–2016)

Connor Patrick Stalions (born July 27, 1995) is an American football coach who most recently served as the offensive coordinator at Belleville High School in 2024. Stalions is best known for his role in the University of Michigan football sign-stealing scandal, which came to light during the 2023 college football season.

After the allegations came to surface, Stalions resigned as a staff member for Michigan, as the team went on to win the 2023 national championship. Stalions starred in Netflix's Sign Stealer documentary that premiered on August 27, 2024.

== Early life and education ==
Born in Houston, Texas, on July 27, 1995, Stalions is the son of Michigan alumni Brock and Kelly Stalions. Stalions grew up in Lake Orion, Michigan and graduated from Lake Orion High School in 2013, where he played football and basketball, winning the 2010 MHSAA state championship in football as a player.

Stalions graduated from the United States Naval Academy in 2017, where he served as a student-coach for Ken Niumatalolo and the Navy Midshipmen football program.

== Marine Corps career ==
Stalions served five years in the U.S. Marine Corps from 2017–2022 as a Logistics Officer, stationed in Camp Pendleton, CA. He reached the rank of Captain and received an Honorable Discharge in 2022 as he transitioned to the University of Michigan football program in an official role.

== Coaching career ==
=== University of Michigan ===
Stalions was employed by the Michigan football program as a Defensive Analyst from May 2022 to October 2023. Stalions had a significant role in the recruiting department and assisting the defensive staff. In Stalions' final three years with Michigan including his volunteer time with the program, Michigan won three consecutive Big Ten Championships and the 2023 National Championship.

==== Role in advance scouting scandal ====
The NCAA publicly announced a mid-season investigation into Stalions and the Michigan football program in October 2023, which many referred to as a "sign stealing" scandal (though "sign stealing" is permitted by the NCAA). The scope of the University of Michigan's sign-stealing operation included both video evidence of electronics prohibited by the NCAA to steal signs and a significant paper trail, per sources. Stalions purchased tickets in his own name for more than 30 games over three years at 11 different Big Ten schools. The NCAA revealed that Stalions referred to this group as the "KGB", and the scheme had scouted at least 13 future opponents over 52 contests. In a recorded call, Stalions referred to sideline footage obtained as "dirty film".

On November 3, 2023, Stalions, who was at the center of the scandal, resigned. Stalions himself was also photographed in disguise on the sidelines for a game Central Michigan played against Michigan State on September 1, 2023. A former staffer stated that Stalions was there to both decipher Michigan State's signals and help with play-calling. When asked by NCAA investigators whether he attended the MSU-CMU game, Connor stated that he "did not recall" attending a specific game.

The NCAA banned advance scouting in 1994 as a "cost-cutting measure designed to promote equity for programs that could not afford to send scouts;" though a solid majority of schools voted to overturn the ban in 2013, the motion failed to reach the required 62.5% supermajority.

The NCAA initially contacted Stalions following the 2023–24 season and interviewed him in the spring of 2024. No public information has been released regarding which specific bylaw(s) the NCAA alleges Stalions violated. Bylaw 11.6.1 prevents "advance in-person scouting of a future opponent in the same season" by institutional staff members.

On August 15, 2025, the NCAA would issue an eight-year show-cause order against Stalions.

==== Resignation from the University of Michigan ====
On November 3, 2023, Stalions resigned from the University of Michigan's staff. Stalions' attorney told media that neither Michigan football head coach Jim Harbaugh nor others on the team were aware of any "improper conduct."

=== High School Coaching Career ===
==== Mumford Defensive Coordinator ====
Stalions volunteered for Detroit Mumford High School as the defensive coordinator in 2024. Prior to Stalions arriving at Mumford, the team had won one game in three seasons. The program had only 18 players in the program and posted a 1–8 record in the 2024 regular season.

==== Belleville Offensive Coordinator ====
Following the 2024 regular season, Belleville High School hired Stalions as the team's offensive coordinator for the playoffs. The Tigers won their first playoff game with Stalions calling plays, defeating Ann Arbor Pioneer 68–0. Belleville then went on to defeat Saline, the #4-ranked team in the state, 42–7 to win the District Championship, prior to being knocked out by the #1-ranked team, Detroit Catholic Central, in the Regional Championship. Following the conclusion of the season, both Elijah Dotson and Bryce Underwood flipped their commitments from Pittsburgh and LSU, respectively, to Michigan, where their offensive coordinator Connor Stalions had served as a defensive analyst.
