= Pasha Eshghi =

Canadian filmmaker

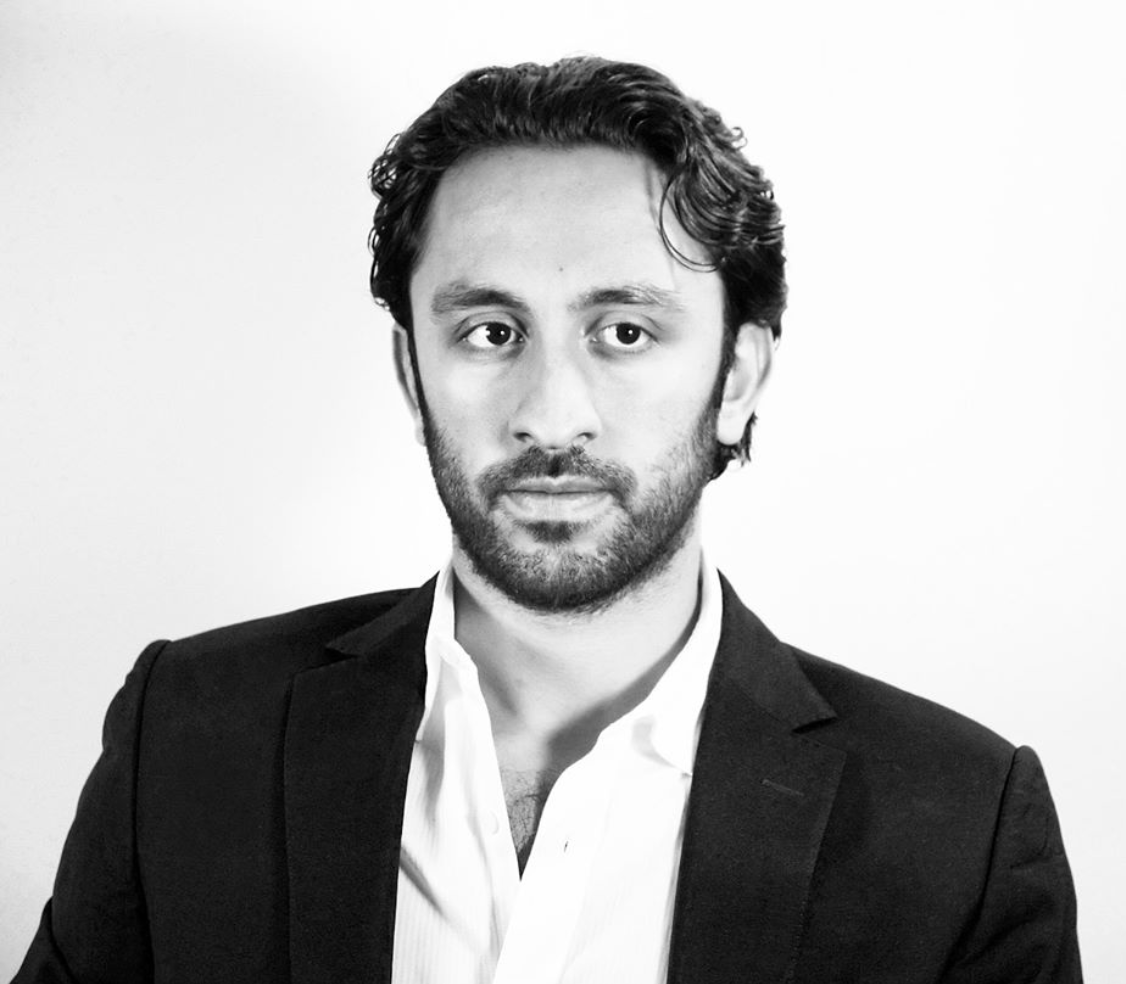
- Eshghi in December 2018
- Born: December 15, 1992 (age 33); Vancouver, British Columbia, Canada
- Occupations: Director, producer, screenwriter, editor
- Years active: 2015–present
- Website: http://www.pasha.film

Pasha Eshghi (born December 15, 1992) is a Canadian filmmaker. He is known for co-creating both BizNasty Does BC and NHL First Timer, as well as for his work producing content for the Barstool Sports hockey podcast, Spittin' Chiclets.

== Biography ==
Pasha Eshghi was born in Vancouver, British Columbia. He attended Collingwood School for 12 years before attending The University of British Columbia where he graduated from the Film Production program in 2015. He is an avid New Jersey Devils fan.

== Filmography ==
In 2015, as he was finishing up his last semester in film school, Eshghi produced & directed SWERVE, an action/comedy web series about a limo driver and his adventures with his passengers. The series comprised six episodes and starred Alexander Ludwig. Eshghi cites the production of SWERVE, and more specifically, the challenges he faced trying to secure distribution for it, as a pivotal learning experience in his early career.

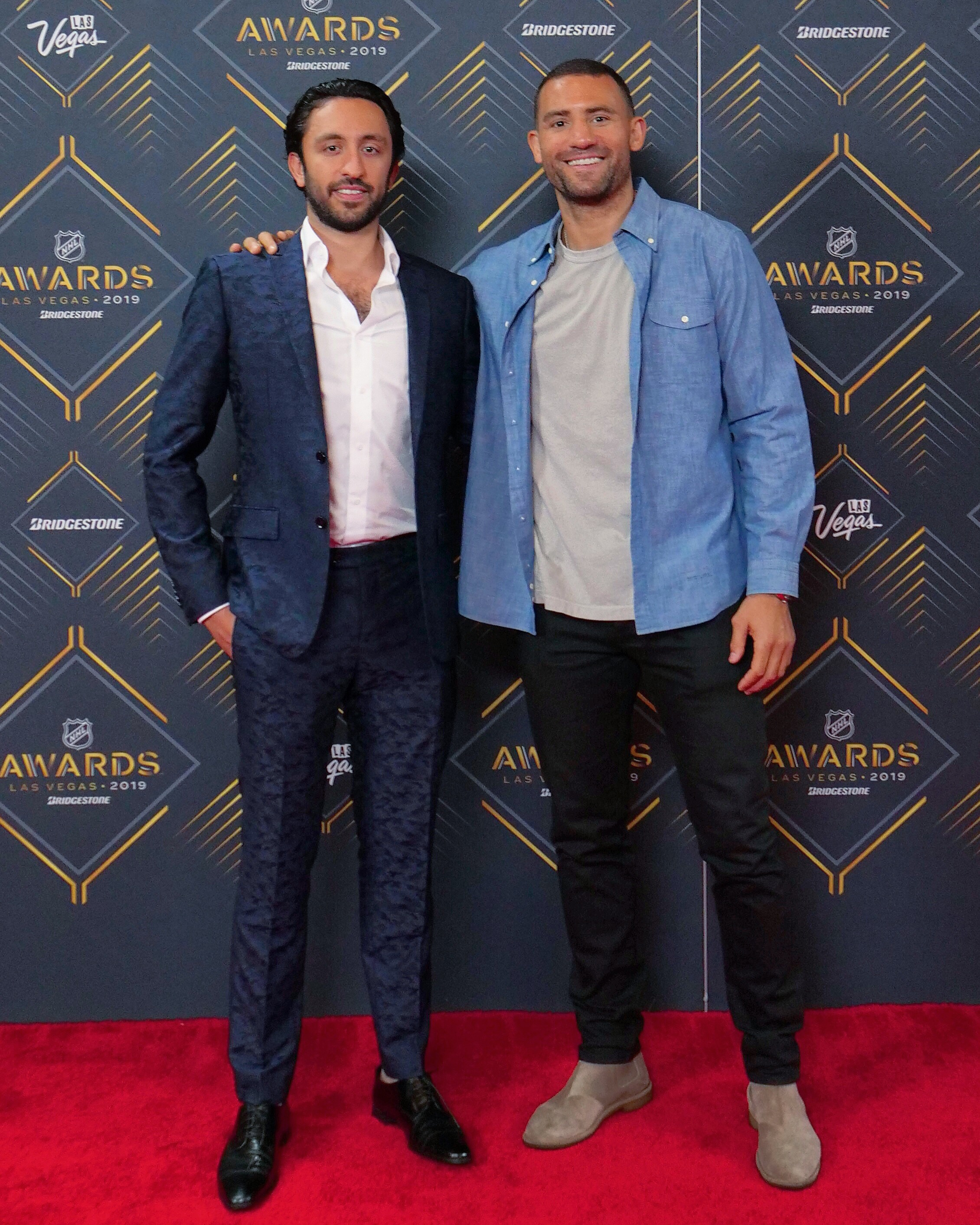
Eshghi attending the 2019 NHL Awards in Las Vegas, with Paul Bissonnette

In 2017, Eshghi teamed up with Paul Bissonnette to create BizNasty Does BC, a mockumentary series exploring British Columbia whilst featuring 17 past and present NHL stars. After viewing the series, Barstool Sports president Dave Portnoy insisted that it be released on his network. In early 2018, after months of negotiations, the series was sold to Barstool Sports and distributed through all of their platforms.

Eshghi appears onscreen regularly throughout the series as he portrays himself, the producer, in an exaggerated role for comedic effect. This is not the first time he has made an appearance in one of his own projects, as he previously played the role of an airline captain in SWERVE. Additionally, in 2018, Eshghi appeared in a series of skits aired on Sportsnet where he impersonates Roberto Luongo.

In late 2018, Eshghi struck a deal with the NHL to create the series NHL First Timer, where people are taken to their first hockey games and given a VIP experience in an effort to convert them into hockey fans. Over the course of the series a diverse crowd of people are featured as guests, ranging from pro athletes to underprivileged kids. One episode sees the Toronto Maple Leafs and Auston Matthews surprise a terminally ill father and his two sons with a trip to Toronto to watch the Maple Leafs in action.

In August 2019, Eshghi produced a video titled "The CCM Sandbagger Invitational" that featured Sidney Crosby and Nathan Mackinnon competing against Paul Bissonnette and Ryan Whitney in a round of golf. The video was very well received and peaked at number 25 on Youtube's trending videos chart for some time shortly after its release. The video was so well received that it was turned into a series that, at the time of writing, consists of 24 episodes which have garnered over 15.5 million views. The series stars a wide range of athletes and celebrities, including Sean Avery, Kevin Connolly (actor), David Pastrnak, Josh Richards (internet personality), Jeremy Roenick and Teemu Selanne.

In 2020, Eshghi and Bissonnette partnered with Watson Gloves, Canada's oldest glove company, to produce a series of commercials for them. They released "Dropping the Gloves with BizNasty" in November 2020, and "Spittin' Chiclets x Watson Gloves" in November of 2021. Also in November 2021, Eshghi produced and directed a commercial for Hockey Canada and Watson Gloves.
