= Keith Yandle =

American ice hockey player (born 1986)

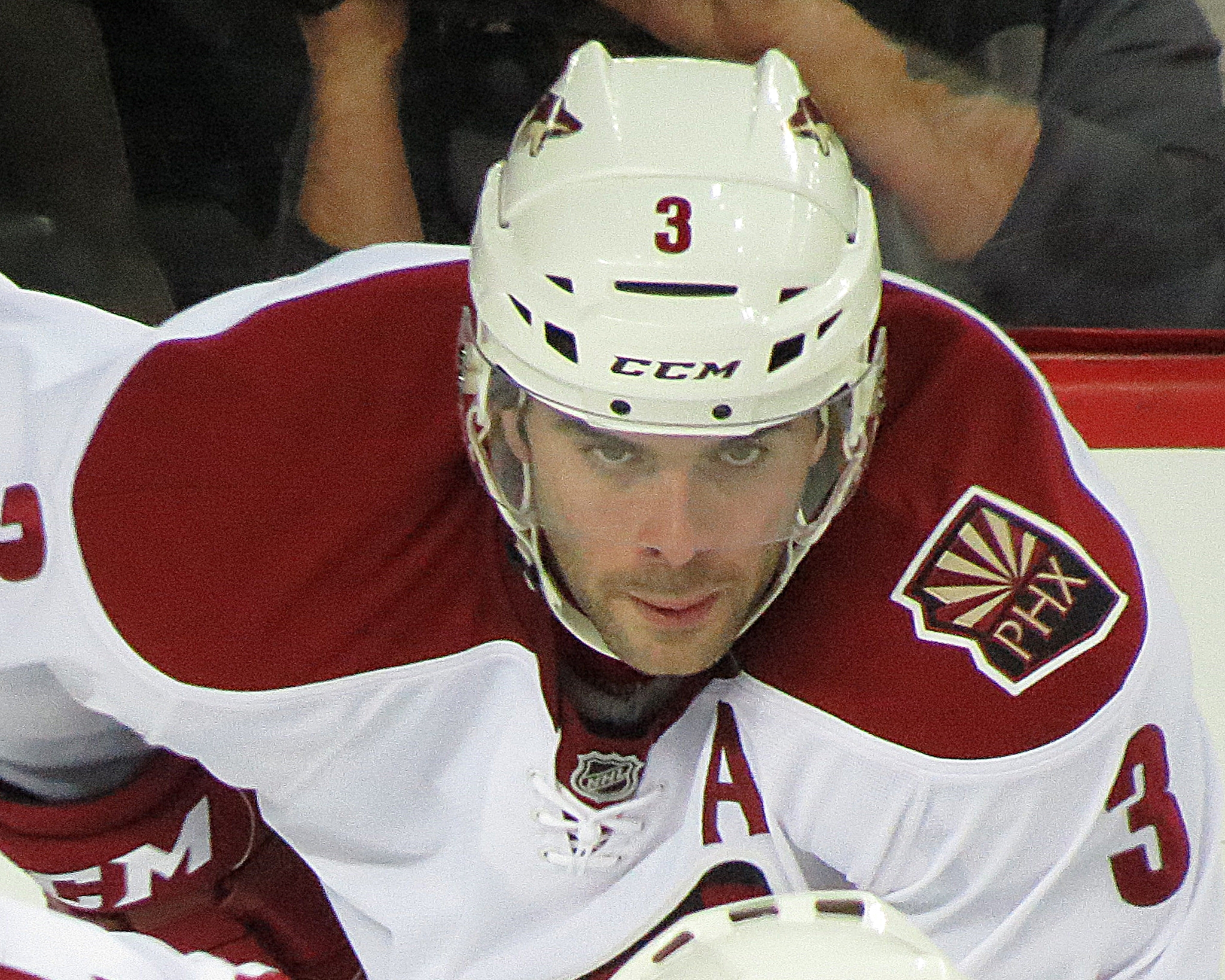
- Yandle with the Phoenix Coyotes in 2013
- Born: September 9, 1986 (age 40) Boston, Massachusetts, U.S.
- Height: 6 ft 1 in (185 cm)
- Weight: 190 lb (86 kg; 13 st 8 lb)
- Position: Defense
- Shot: Left
- Played for: Arizona Coyotes; New York Rangers; Florida Panthers; Philadelphia Flyers
- National team: United States
- NHL draft: 105th overall, 2005; Phoenix Coyotes
- Playing career: 2006–2022

Keith Michael Yandle (born September 9, 1986) is an American former professional ice hockey defenseman and media personality. Yandle was drafted by the Phoenix Coyotes in the fourth round, 105th overall, at the 2005 NHL entry draft. He played 1,109 games for the Arizona Coyotes, New York Rangers, Florida Panthers, and Philadelphia Flyers.

After playing his junior career in the QMJHL for the Moncton Wildcats, where he was named CHL defenceman of the year, Yandle made his NHL debut in 2006 and quickly established himself as a premier offensive defenseman, leading the Coyotes in points in both the 2012–13 and 2013–14 seasons. He holds the third-longest NHL ironman streak of consecutive games played, with 989, and held the all-time record from January 2022 to October 2022; during the 2020–21 season, he became the third player ever to record 900 consecutive games played. Yandle passed Doug Jarvis's streak as the then-longest in NHL history on January 25, 2022 after playing his 965th consecutive game.

After retiring, Yandle joined the popular hockey-themed podcast Spittin' Chiclets.

== Early life ==
Yandle was born on September 9, 1986, in Boston, Massachusetts. Both of his parents worked long hours for FedEx in order to provide for their three children: while his father Bud drove trucks for the company, his mother Patti, who suffered from rheumatoid arthritis for most of her adult life, served as a dispatcher. Although his father also worked as a local youth hockey coach in Milton, Massachusetts, Yandle was not a full-time ice hockey player in his childhood. He was instead a multi-sport athlete, playing hockey, baseball, basketball, lacrosse, and American football, depending on what was in season. During hockey season, Yandle was often overlooked on All-Star teams and by scouts, who were focused on the flashier Boston-area defenseman, Dan McGoff of nearby Charlestown. While McGoff never reached the National Hockey League (NHL), Yandle was inspired by him and used their rivalry to improve his own skills.

In 2000, Yandle played in the Quebec International Pee-Wee Hockey Tournament with a minor ice hockey team from the South Shore region of Massachusetts. From there, he began playing high school hockey for Milton High School, taking the Wildcats to an 18–2 win–loss record. After one year there, he chose to enroll at Cushing Academy, a college-preparatory school in Ashburnham, Massachusetts, and to focus solely on hockey. During his junior season in 2003–04, Yandle scored 14 goals and 48 assists for Cushing; as a senior the following year, he added an additional 14 goals and 40 assists in 34 games, and was named an All-New England First Team selection.

== Playing career ==
=== Amateur ===
Yandle originally intended to play college ice hockey for the University of New Hampshire, where his older brother Brian was already playing, but he struggled academically throughout high school and was denied admittance. After his plans to attend New Hampshire fell through, Yandle instead offered a verbal commitment to attend the University of Maine instead. Ultimately, however, he chose to forego college entirely in order to sign with the Moncton Wildcats of the Quebec Major Junior Hockey League (QMJHL), believing that a year of junior ice hockey was the fastest option to turn professional. Playing alongside future NHL standouts Brad Marchand and Jason Demers, Yandle scored 25 goals and 59 assists, the highest of any Moncton defenseman in history. As a team, the Wildcats had a 52–15–0–3 record, leading to a franchise-high 107 points. After winning the President's Cup as QMJHL champions, they advanced to the Memorial Cup, where they fell in the finals to the Quebec Ramparts. At the end of the year, Yandle won both the Emile Bouchard Trophy for the top defenseman in the QMJHL and the Telus Cup for the best defensive player in the league, and he was a QMJHL First All-Star Team selection. The Canadian Hockey League (CHL) also named Yandle their Defenseman of the Year, and he was part of that year's CHL First All-Star Team.

=== Professional ===
==== Phoenix/Arizona Coyotes (2006–2015) ====
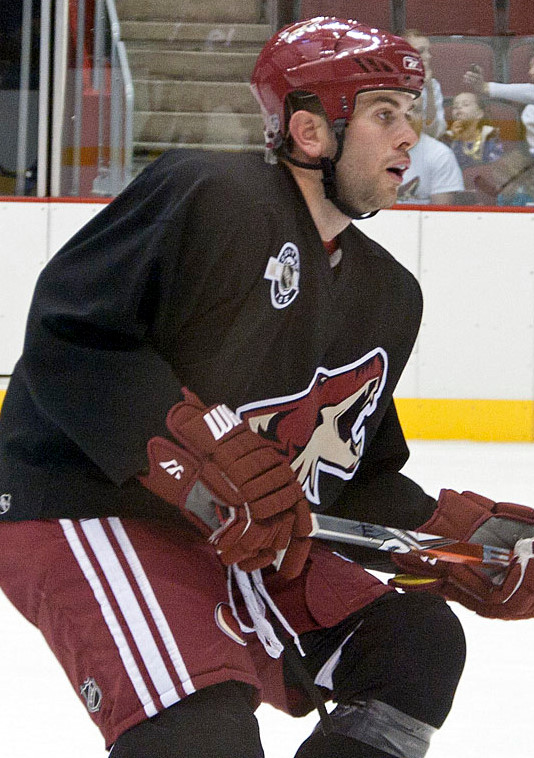
Yandle at Coyotes practice in September 2010

Drafted by the Phoenix Coyotes in the fourth round, 105th overall, in 2005, Yandle made his NHL debut on October 11, 2006, against the Detroit Red Wings, logging 20 minutes of ice time in the game. In the 2007–08 season, he participated in the American Hockey League All-Star Game as a member of the PlanetUSA team.

In his first Stanley Cup playoff game, on April 14, 2010, Yandle scored the first goal for Phoenix against Detroit to tie the game at 1–1. He would later add an assist and be named one of the game's three stars. Yandle was named to the 2011 NHL All-Star Game as a replacement for the Atlanta Thrashers' Tobias Enström.

Shortly after free agency began on July 1, 2011, Yandle signed a five-year contract extension with the Coyotes worth $26.25 million. He played an integral role in the Coyotes' push in the 2012 Stanley Cup playoffs that saw them face the Los Angeles Kings in the Western Conference Final, contributing nine points during their run. On November 12, 2014, he played his 400th consecutive game with the team. He ranks second all-time on the franchise's longest consecutive games played list, behind only Dale Hawerchuk (475).

==== New York Rangers (2015–2016) ====
On March 1, 2015, Yandle was part of a massive trade between the Coyotes and the New York Rangers: New York acquired Yandle, Chris Summers, and a fourth-round selection in the 2016 NHL entry draft, while Arizona received John Moore, prospect Anthony Duclair, and two draft picks. Rangers general manager Glen Sather had apparently been trying to acquire Yandle for years, but could not afford him under the strict NHL salary cap; as part of the 2015 trade, the Coyotes agreed to retain half of Yandle's salary, allowing the Rangers to fit him into their roster. Yandle had a difficult start with the new team, recording only one point in his first ten games, but soon entered a hot streak beginning with a three-assist game against the Anaheim Ducks on March 22. By April 5, the Rangers registered their 50th win of the season, and Yandle had eight points in as many games. He finished the season with 11 points in 21 games, and managed to contribute another 11 points in 19 playoff games before the Rangers were eliminated by the Tampa Bay Lightning in the 2015 Eastern Conference Finals. After the Rangers' playoff run came to an end, Yandle revealed that he had suffered a sprained acromioclavicular joint after taking a hit from Blake Comeau of the Pittsburgh Penguins during the first round of playoffs, but that it had begun to heal and he gradually felt less pain over the course of the postseason.

Shortly before the start of the 2015–16 season, Yandle said that his shoulder had fully recovered without surgery and that he was ready to take an active role on the Rangers' power play unit. He opened the season on the second defensive pair alongside Dan Girardi, who had also suffered a major injury during the playoffs. By December, however, he had found a strong rhythm with Dylan McIlrath, a far more defensively-minded skater who could balance Yandle's offensive-oriented style of play. Most of the conversation around Yandle during the 2015–16 season surrounded whether or not he would be traded again: an unrestricted free agent following the year, Yandle led the team with 21 assists halfway through the season but would also be expensive to retain. When Ryan McDonagh was taken out of the lineup that February with an injury, Yandle received the bulk of his playing time, and in that span, the Rangers were 7–1–1. Yandle also became a force on the power play after McDonagh's injury: the Rangers had a 2 percent success rate on the power play from December 28 to February 10, which was bumped to 18.8 percent from February 10 to March 24. In his first full season with the Rangers, Yandle scored 47 points, including a team-leading 42 assists and 22 power play points. The Rangers reached the 2016 Stanley Cup playoffs but lost to the Penguins in only five games, and Pittsburgh's scoring rush in Game 5 began on a failed turnover attempt from Yandle.

==== Florida Panthers (2016–2021) ====
On June 20, 2016, ten days before Yandle was set to become an unrestricted free agent if he did not sign a contract with the Rangers, his contract negotiation rights were traded to the Florida Panthers in exchange for a sixth-round selection in the 2016 draft. If the Panthers were able to sign Yandle by July 1, the Rangers would also receive a fourth-round pick in the 2017 NHL entry draft. Three days later, the Panthers, who were in need of a strong force on their power play, signed Yandle to a seven-year, $44.45 million contract. He began the 2016–17 in a scoring drought, not recording a goal until November 21, in a 3–2 shootout win over his former team, the Rangers. Although Yandle was expected to be out "indefinitely" after being injured during a game against the Boston Bruins on December 5, he unexpectedly took the ice the next day for a game against the Philadelphia Flyers, his 578th consecutive NHL contest.

On January 14, 2018, Anaheim Ducks forward Andrew Cogliano was suspended after playing 830 consecutive games, effectively making Yandle the leader in the iron man race for most consecutive games played with 676 games played at the time.

On March 7, 2021, Yandle played in his 1,000th NHL game in a 4–2 loss against the Carolina Hurricanes. Following the COVID-shortened 2020–21 season, having played in his fifth season with the Panthers, Yandle was bought out from the remaining two years of his contract on July 15, 2021.

==== Philadelphia Flyers (2021–2022) ====
On July 27, the eve of the opening of free agency, Yandle agreed to terms on a one-year, $900,000 contract with the Philadelphia Flyers. As he entered the 2021–22 season, there was considerable attention paid to his ongoing iron man streak. Having played in 922 consecutive games up to that point, Yandle was second in NHL history and only 42 behind leader Doug Jarvis. On January 24, 2022, Yandle tied Jarvis's record, playing in his 964th consecutive game with the Flyers facing the Dallas Stars. He broke Jarvis' record on January 25, 2022, when he played his first shift against the New York Islanders. On April 2, 2022, Flyers interim head coach Mike Yeo announced that Yandle would be a healthy scratch in a game versus the Toronto Maple Leafs and his iron man streak at an NHL-record 989 consecutive games was over, in order to give opportunities to prospect Ronnie Attard. At the time of Yeo's decision, Yandle was by some statistical measures the worst defenseman in the NHL; the decision to scratch Yandle was met with some criticism from Flyers teammates and fans due to him being only 11 games short of reaching the 1,000 consecutive game milestone.

On September 20, 2022, Yandle announced his retirement from professional hockey. In late October 2022, Phil Kessel passed Yandle for the longest NHL iron man reign at the time.

== Career statistics ==
=== Regular season and playoffs ===
			Regular season					Playoffs
Season	Team	League	GP	G	A	Pts	PIM	GP	G	A	Pts	PIM
2002–03	Cushing Academy	HS-Prep	30	4	26	30	61	—	—	—	—	—
2003–04	Cushing Academy	HS-Prep	37	14	48	62	78	—	—	—	—	—
2004–05	Cushing Academy	HS-Prep	34	14	40	54	52	—	—	—	—	—
2005–06	Moncton Wildcats	QMJHL	66	25	59	84	109	21	6	14	20	36
2006–07	San Antonio Rampage	AHL	69	6	27	33	97	—	—	—	—	—
2006–07	Phoenix Coyotes	NHL	7	0	2	2	8	—	—	—	—	—
2007–08	San Antonio Rampage	AHL	30	1	14	15	80	5	0	0	0	8
2007–08	Phoenix Coyotes	NHL	43	5	7	12	14	—	—	—	—	—
2008–09	Phoenix Coyotes	NHL	69	4	26	30	37	—	—	—	—	—
2009–10	Phoenix Coyotes	NHL	82	12	29	41	45	7	2	3	5	4
2010–11	Phoenix Coyotes	NHL	82	11	48	59	68	4	0	5	5	0
2011–12	Phoenix Coyotes	NHL	82	11	32	43	51	16	1	8	9	10
2012–13	Phoenix Coyotes	NHL	48	10	20	30	54	—	—	—	—	—
2013–14	Phoenix Coyotes	NHL	82	8	45	53	63	—	—	—	—	—
2014–15	Arizona Coyotes	NHL	63	4	37	41	32	—	—	—	—	—
2014–15	New York Rangers	NHL	21	2	9	11	8	19	2	9	11	10
2015–16	New York Rangers	NHL	82	5	42	47	40	5	1	0	1	2
2016–17	Florida Panthers	NHL	82	5	36	41	39	—	—	—	—	—
2017–18	Florida Panthers	NHL	82	8	48	56	35	—	—	—	—	—
2018–19	Florida Panthers	NHL	82	9	53	62	50	—	—	—	—	—
2019–20	Florida Panthers	NHL	69	5	40	45	20	4	0	3	3	0
2020–21	Florida Panthers	NHL	56	3	24	27	38	3	0	2	2	0
2021–22	Philadelphia Flyers	NHL	77	1	18	19	14	—	—	—	—	—
NHL totals			1,109	103	516	619	616	58	6	30	36	26

=== International ===
Year	Team	Event	Result	GP	G	A	Pts	PIM
2010	United States	WC	13th	6	1	3	4	0
Senior totals				6	1	3	4	0

== Awards and honors ==
Awards	Year	Ref.
QMJHL
President's Cup champion	2006	
First All-Star Team	2006	
Emile Bouchard Trophy	2006	
Telus Cup – Defensive	2006	
CHL
Defenseman of the Year	2006	
First All-Star Team	2006	
AHL
All-Star Game	2008	
NHL
NHL All-Star	2011, 2012, 2019	

== Post-playing career ==
Following the conclusion of his career, on January 14, 2025, Yandle joined the Barstool Sports podcast, Spittin' Chiclets alongside two other former NHL players, Ryan Whitney and Paul Bissonnette. Yandle became a part-owner of the ECHL team, the Greensboro Gargoyles, alongside his podcast partners. Yandle participates in the Sandbagger Invitational golf events as part of Spittin Chiclets and participated in the inaugural Barstool Sports Youtube golf event, the Internet Invitational.
