= NHL First Timer =

Web series by Pasha Eshghi and Paul Bissonette

- Genre: Documentary
- Directed by: Pasha Eshghi; Paul Bissonnette
- Starring: Paul Bissonnette
- Original language: English
- No. of seasons: 1
- No. of episodes: 5

Production
- Producer: Pasha Eshghi
- Cinematography: Pasha Eshghi
- Running time: 6 minutes

NHL First Timer is a web series created by Pasha Eshghi and Paul Bissonnette in collaboration with the NHL. The series is hosted by Bissonnette, who takes people from all walks of life to their first NHL games with the goal of converting them into hockey fans. The series is part of a new initiative by the NHL which aims to tap into the Generation Z demographic by creating digital content in-house that is catered to social media needs. The first season of the series is slated for 5 episodes.

The first episode of the series features the NFL's Jalen Ramsey. The episode caught the attention of the public as it was released shortly after Ramsey's controversial comments where he claimed he could play in the NHL with only six months of training. The third episode saw Bissonnette and the NBA's Robin Lopez team up with the Salvation Army to bring two underprivileged teens to the NHL Winter Classic.

Other notable guest appearances include former Premier League defender Jay Demerit and current NHL players PK Subban, Patrick Kane and Brock Boeser.

== Cast ==
- Paul Bissonnette as himself
- Jalen Ramsey as himself
- Robin Lopez as himself
- Jay Demerit as himself
- Patrick Kane as himself
- PK Subban as himself
- Brock Boeser as himself
- Erik Gudbranson as himself
