= Willie Colon =

Willie Colon may refer to:

- Willie Colón (1950–2026), American salsa musician and social activist
- Willie Colon (American football) (born 1983), American football player
