= Greensboro Gargoyles =

Professional minor league ice hockey team based in Greensboro, North Carolina

- City: Greensboro, North Carolina
- League: ECHL
- Conference: Eastern
- Division: North
- Founded: 2025
- Home arena: First Horizon Coliseum
- Colors: Gargoyle Grape, Greensboro Gold, Black
- Owner: Zawyer Sports & Entertainment
- Head coach: Mitch Giguere
- Affiliates: Carolina Hurricanes (NHL); Chicago Wolves (AHL)
- Website: Official site

Franchise history
- 2025 – present: Greensboro Gargoyles

The Greensboro Gargoyles are a professional minor league ice hockey team based in Greensboro, North Carolina, in the Piedmont Triad. They play in the ECHL and are Greensboro's first ECHL team since the folding of the Greensboro Generals in 2004. They are owned by Zawyer Sports & Entertainment, who also own the Charlotte Checkers, Jacksonville Icemen, Savannah Ghost Pirates and the Tahoe Knight Monsters. Former NHL players Paul Bissonnette, Ryan Whitney, and Keith Yandle of the Spittin' Chiclets podcast at Barstool Sports are part owners of the team, as well as NFL player J. J. Jansen.

== History ==
On January 14, 2025, the Gargoyles name, logo and color scheme was unveiled.

On May 6, 2025, the Gargoyles announced their affiliation with the National Hockey League's Carolina Hurricanes and the American Hockey League's Chicago Wolves.

On June 4, 2025, the Gargoyles announced that Scott Burt would become the first coach in franchise history. On July 30, the Gargoyles signed their first ever player, forward Logan Nelson.

== Arena ==
Their home games are played at First Horizon Coliseum.
