= Brianna LaPaglia =

American influencer and podcaster (born 1999)

- Born: June 17, 1999 (age 27); Rockland, Massachusetts, US
- Other name: Brianna Chickenfry
- Education: Baldwin Wallace University
- Occupations: Influencer, podcaster, model
- Years active: 2020–present
- Partner: Zach Bryan (2023–2024)

Instagram information
- Page: Brianna LaPaglia
- Years active: 2012–present
- Genres: Vloging, skits, lip-sync, lifestyle, traveling
- Followers: 1.1 million

TikTok information
- Page: Brianna LaPaglia
- Years active: 2018–present
- Genres: Vlogging, skits, lip-sync, lifestyle, traveling
- Followers: 2.5 million

X information
- Handle: @BChickenfry
- Display name: Brianna Chickenfry
- Years active: 2020–2022
- Topics: Entertainment, sports
- Followers: 110 thousand

YouTube information
- Channels: Plan Bri Uncut; Brianna Chickenfry
- Years active: 2020–present
- Genres: Podcasting, vlogging, lifestyle, travel
- Subscribers: Plan Bri Uncut: 144 thousand Brianna Chickenfry: 44.8 thousand
- Views: Plan Bri Uncut: 2.33 million Brianna Chickenfry: 2.12 million
- Last updated: October 26, 2026

Brianna LaPaglia (born June 17, 1999), also known as Brianna Chickenfry, is an American influencer, podcaster, and model. Heralding from Greater Boston, LaPaglia garnered prominence on TikTok via her videos about her hangovers while in college, and was subsequently recruited by fellow Massachusetts native Dave Portnoy into his Barstool Sports media company. She started her first podcast, Plan Bri Uncut, in 2020, which she continues to host; in that year, she also joined as a co-host on Barstool's BFFs podcast, which ended in late 2025.

LaPaglia was in a high-profile relationship with American country singer Zach Bryan from mid 2023 to late 2024; their relationship and public breakup garnered extensive public and media attention. Since then, LaPaglia has involved herself in modelling, being the first to be featured in Sports Illustrated Swimsuit's inaugural "digital cover" in 2025. Later in that year, she was also a contestant on the fourth season of the reality television series Special Forces: World's Toughest Test, where she finished as a finalist.

== Life and career ==
Brianna LaPaglia was born on June 17, 1999 in Rockland, Massachusetts, located south of Boston. She has described herself as a reserved, quiet, and creative child, who aspired to be a race driver. She graduated Rockland High School in 2017 before attending Baldwin Wallace University (BW) in Berea, Ohio for less than two years as a pre-medical student. She was a member of BW's swimming and diving team.

LaPaglia got her start as an influencer on Vine. While on Vine, LaPaglia had a video go viral on the platform on which she compared her legs to Burger King’s Chicken Fries; she later used the nickname "Chickenfry" on her account on Musical.ly as a result. LaPaglia began posting on the platform, later known as TikTok, in 2018 while attending university. Her content on her hangovers began to go viral on the platform, and in 2020, while in college, she was offered a internship by Barstool Sports, an American media company headed by fellow Massachusetts native Dave Portnoy. The internship eventually evolved into a full-time job, and she dropped out of university, having relocated to New York.

In July 2020, LaPaglia launched her first Barstool podcast, Plan Bri Uncut, where she discusses various events in her life. Childhood friend and stand-up comedian Grace O'Malley joined as a co-host in April 2022. In October 2020, she joined BFFs, alongside co-hosts Portnoy and Josh Richards, to fill in a vacant third position. The podcast focuses on pop culture and features interviews with celebrities. Portnoy left the podcast in 2024, and despite plans by LaPaglia and Richards to expand the following year, the show officially ended in October 2025.

In January 2025, LaPaglia made her Sports Illustrated Swimsuit debut, being featured in the publication's inaugural "digital cover". In that same month, she attended the 82nd Golden Globes. In late 2025, she was featured as a contestant in Season 4 of Special Forces: World's Toughest Test, a reality TV series featuring quasi-military training. She finished as a finalist.

LaPaglia has engaged in various feuds with other influencers. In late 2024, relations deteriorated with O'Malley, leading to Plan Bri Uncut being temporarily suspended for around a year. Shortly after BFFs ended in late 2025, Plan Bri Uncut was relaunched without O'Malley. Additionally, LaPaglia was a former friend of influencer and fellow Barstool associate Alex Cooper. LaPaglia claimed to have distanced herself from Cooper due to being informed of negative details of her from Alix Earle. Through this, LaPaglia in early 2026 became involved in the ongoing row between Cooper and Earle that had started in early 2025, in which Cooper accused LaPaglia, who has sided with Earle, of duplicity. LaPaglia subsequently charged Cooper with being behind the falling out between her and O'Malley.

== Public image and personal life ==
Brianna LaPaglia is bisexual, and came out as such while in university. She has several tattoos. She is a proud Massachusetts native, having described it as the "best state in the world".

On May 12, 2024, LaPaglia and her then boyfriend Zach Bryan were involved in a side-by-side motor crash, in which their car flipped over multiple times and left "a lot of blood". Bryan received stitches from the paramedics while LaPaglia suffered several scratches and bruises from broken glass. In late 2025, she received forty four stitches after getting injured in the Turks and Caicos. In May 2026, she disclosed on TikTok that she had been rushed to the hospital after experiencing severe abdominal pain; doctors subsequently found a large ovarian cyst inside her. She later underwent surgery.

LaPaglia had been open about her experiences with weight. Following her breakup with Bryan in late 2024, she disclosed that she had lost nearly fifteen pounds, which she attributed to the emotional strain of the relationship. Following the breakup, she began intentionally bulking as part of what she described as her healing process, ultimately gaining 25 pounds. LaPaglia has criticized the growth in Ozempic usage for weight-loss purposes, declaring in a 2026 TikTok that "Every single bitch I know is on Ozempic. People that do not need Ozempic", and adding that its users are "all gonna die", a statement which received notable media coverage and major criticism, including from plastic surgeon and vocal Ozempic advocate Terry Dubrow. In response, she stated in a follow-up TikTok that she was only referring to "skinny bitches" who do not need Ozempic.

=== Relationships ===
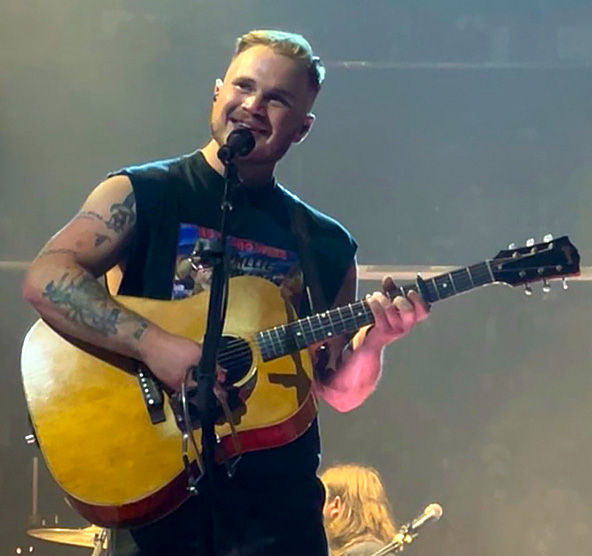
LaPaglia's relationship and eventual breakup with country singer Zach Bryan, pictured here in 2023 shortly after they started dating, garnered substantial media and public attention

LaPaglia has stated that she was a near continuous string of relationships for nearly a decade, from age 16 until 25. In an October 2024 interview on Haliey Welch's Talk Tuah podcast, LaPaglia advised against dating famous people. From the summer of 2023 to the autumn of 2024, LaPaglia was in a high-profile relationship with American country singer Zach Bryan. The relationship and its end garnered substantial media coverage.

The two met on May 11, 2023, at that year's Academy of Country Music Awards, where she asked for a photo; besides that, they did not speak since they were both in relationships. Later in June, LaPaglia and Josh Richards attended a concert of Bryan's at Forest Hills Stadium in New York, shortly after he broke up with his girlfriend; Richards and LaPaglia joined him on stage during the event, and shortly afterwards following LaPaglia exiting her relationship, Bryan direct messaged her. The relationship was hinted at by LaPaglia on Plan Bri Uncut in July when she stated she was dating "a guy named Zach" before being confirmed in an August Instagram post.

Throughout the duration of their relationship, LaPaglia frequently featured Bryan in her social media. During their relationship, however, tension existed between the two, with LaPaglia relaying an alleged story of how Bryan chastised her for her appearance while they were together at the 2024 Golden Globes, prompting him to unfollow her and demand that she delete multiple posts of hers on Instagram. LaPaglia stated that the relationship took such an extensive toll on her that friends and family "didn't recognize her", prompting her to end it on October 21. Public speculation of a split had already existed in the weeks prior, and after fans allegedly noticed that Bryan had a profile on the dating app Raya, he disclosed via Instagram Stories on October 22 that they had broken up. LaPaglia stated in a since privated YouTube video as well as a story on Instagram released later that day that she was blindsided by Bryan making the breakup public only a day after it occurred and asked for privacy.

Since their breakup, LaPaglia has repeatedly feuded with Bryan. On November 5, Richards and Dave Portnoy released a disstrack in support of LaPaglia targeting Bryan titled "The Smallest Man Who Ever Lived"; the song was shortly afterwards taken off all platforms, which was attributed to copyright reasons from an interpolating of Bryan's song "28" as well as the fact that Richards and Bryan were both signed to Warner Music Group. Shortly afterwards on November 7, LaPaglia alleged in an episode of Plan Bri Uncut that she had endured severe emotional abuse at the hands of Bryan during their relationship and that he had requested that she sign a non-disclosure agreement regarding their relationship in exchange for $12 million and a New York apartment. On November 10, Portnoy released another disstrack, titled "Country Diddy", this time without Richards.

Bryans has never publicly commented on LaPaglia's allegations, though has been accused by some of making digs at his ex. On August 4, 2025, he was shown in a video on Instagram burning a Barstool Sports flag, prompting LaPaglia to joke of filing a restraining order, and in January 2026, he released his album With Heaven on Top, which contained songs that were considered to critique LaPaglia. Having already implied her disapproval when it occurred, in February, while on Logan Paul's Impaulsive podcast, she claimed that his marriage and wedding to Samantha Leonard, widely said to look like LaPaglia, was a "dig" at her. Paul had brought up Bryan despite prior requests by LaPaglia to not mention him on the podcast.

After the breakup, LaPaglia temporarily avoided dating to focus on herself; stating that she was content being single even after supposedly having her "dms popping off" following her Sports Illustrated Swimsuit feature. She described the feature as a massive "fuck you" to Bryan. LaPaglia also attributed her appearance on Special Forces as part of her recovery effort after the relationship.

Following the split with Bryan, LaPaglia intentionally obscured her relationships from public viewing. LaPaglia stated that after the breakup, she experimented with dating women. In February 2026, she claimed to have started talking to a man she nicknamed "Meatball Man", named so since she canceled a date he had set up due to her allegedly getting food poisoning from eating meatballs. The ensuing relationship was non-exclusive, and "Meatball Man" was stated by LaPaglia to have repeatedly flirted with other women. The relationship ended by the start of June after LaPaglia was informed by a woman at the 2026 Stagecoach Festival that another woman had hooked up with him.

== Filmography ==
Year	Title	Role	Ref.
2020–present	Plan Bri Uncut	Herself	
2020–2025	BFFs	Herself	
2025	Special Forces: World's Toughest Test	Herself	
