= Josh Richards =

Josh Richards may refer to:

- Josh Richards (racing driver)
- Josh Richards (internet personality)
