= Francis Ellis (comedian) =

American comedian (born 1989)

- Born: Francis Ellis; March 26, 1989 (age 37)
- Education: Yarmouth High School (Maine); Harvard University

Comedy career
- Medium: Stand-up; Podcast

Francis Ellis (born March 26, 1989) is an American comedian, actor, and podcaster. He hosts the Son of a Boy Dad podcast at Barstool Sports.

== Early life and education ==
Francis Ellis was born to Corson and Marion Ellis. His father was the chief executive officer of Kepware Technologies in Portland, Maine.

Ellis was raised in Freeport, Maine. He attended Yarmouth High School in Maine where he was an all-state lacrosse and soccer player. He went on to play lacrosse at Harvard University. He was captain of the Harvard lacrosse team his senior year.

== Career ==
After graduating from Harvard, Ellis moved to New York City to pursue a career in stand-up comedy. In 2017, he entered a competition at Barstool Sports called Barstool Idol to win a job at Barstool and ultimately won the competition. At the company, he hosted ''Barstool Breakfast'' alongside Large and Willie Colon. He worked at Barstool until 2019 when he was let go from the company for writing an inappropriate blog.

Ellis rejoined Barstool in 2022 with his new podcast, Oops the Podcast, with co-host Giulio Gallaroti. The new podcast only lasted a year and was canceled in 2023 due to poor viewership. Ellis joined the Son of a Boy Dad podcast at Barstool with co-hosts Adam Ferrone (Rone) and Harry Settel (Lil Sas) in 2024.

Ellis is an avid golfer who often joins the Foreplay golf brand at Barstool for various golf events. In 2025, Ellis participated in the inaugural Internet Invitational organized by Barstool and Bob Does Sports and held in Missouri. Ellis ultimately won the event along with his partners, Brad Dalke and Cody "Beef" Franke.

Francis was on the first two seasons of the Netflix show Tires as George. He has also been featured in Shane Gillis's sketch comedy series, Gilly and Keeves.

== Controversy ==
In 2019, Ellis was fired from Barstool Sports after he wrote an ill-timed blog about Mackenzie Lueck, 23-year-old student at the University of Utah who was missing at the time and was found murdered shortly after he wrote the blog containing a smattering of dark humor.

Ellis garnered further controversy when he was caught on a hot mic talking about Fox News after an appearance he had made on the network on Jesse Watters Primetime. He made comments that Fox News and Tucker Carlson were "trafficking in hate."

== Filmography ==
=== Films ===
Year	Title	Role	Notes
2022	Gilly and Keeves: The Special	Politician	Sketch comedy special

=== Television ===
Year	Title	Role	Notes
2021	Gilly and Keeves	Officiant	Episode: “Blind Guy Ruins Wedding”
2024–present	Tires	George	2 episodes

== Personal life ==
Francis Ellis was married to Sierra DeRose in August 2022. They divorced in July 2024.
