= Brad Dalke =

American professional golfer (born 1997)

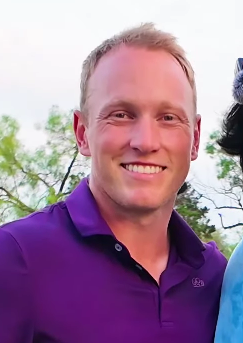
- Dalke in 2025

Personal information
- Nickname: Dalke Kong
- Nationality: United States
- Born: August 19, 1997 (age 29) Yukon, Oklahoma, U.S.
- Height: 5 ft 11 in (1.80 m)
- Weight: 180 lb (82 kg; 13 st)
- Spouse: Abbie (m. 2025)

Career
- Sport: Golf
- College: University of Oklahoma
- Turned professional: 2019

Best results in major championships
- Masters Tournament: CUT: 2017
- PGA Championship: DNP
- U.S. Open: CUT: 2017
- The Open Championship: DNP

Brad Dalke (born August 19, 1997) is an American professional golfer. He finished runner-up at the 2016 U.S. Amateur and was part of the University of Oklahoma team which won the 2017 NCAA Division I men's golf championship. After turning professional in 2019, Dalke struggled with his game and transitioned to creating content on YouTube with Good Good in 2023.

== Early life ==
Dalke was born in Yukon, Oklahoma, on August 19, 1997. He was the youngest of seven children to Kay (née Pryor) and Bill Dalke. Kay was a golf coach at McKinney Boyd High School in McKinney, Texas. Bill was a football coach; he left his post at Yukon High School in 1999 to become head coach at Burkburnett High School in Texas, before returning to Oklahoma to coach at Hobart High School in 2013.

Dalke started to play golf soon after he learned to walk and played in his first tournament at age three. He won the 10-11 age division of the Southwest Junior Open by 12 strokes, and the 12-13 division of the Southwest Junior Championship by 19 strokes. He also had a six-shot victory in the under-12 division of the U.S. Kids World Championship held at Pinehurst Resort in 2010, where he carded rounds of 68-68-68.

In August 2010, Dalke received a scholarship to play collegiate golf at the University of Oklahoma, beginning in the fall of 2016. The commitment at age 12 generated significant media attention. Dalke won the Thunderbird International Junior in 2011, becoming at age 13 the youngest male winner of an American Junior Golf Association (AJGA) invitational tournament.

Aged 14, Dalke was 5 ft 9 in (1.75 m), 185 lb (84 kg) and averaged around 290 yards (270 m) off the tee. He won his second AJGA title in February 2013 at the HP Boys Championship, finishing one shot ahead of Peter Kim and Scottie Scheffler, and his third at the PING Invitational in October 2013. Dalke was named a first-team All-American by the AJGA five times, which tied the record for most All-American AJGA honors. He represented the United States at the 2014 Junior Ryder Cup and played in five AJGA Wyndham Cups, where he matched Tiger Woods' record of 12 points. Dalke was an Edmond Christian Academy graduate; he graduated a year early in 2015.

== Collegiate career ==
In August 2015, Dalke won the Junior PGA Championship. During the event, he shot a 9-under 62, which broke the tournament record. With the victory, Dalke earned an exemption to make his debut on the PGA Tour at the 2016 Valero Texas Open, where he missed the cut. In his freshman season with the Oklahoma Sooners, Dalke finished runner-up at the Ka'anapali Classic Collegiate Invitational in November 2015 and shot a final-round 68 at the 2016 NCAA Division I men's golf championship to help Oklahoma qualify for the match play bracket for the first time in the school's history.

At the U.S. Amateur in August 2016, Dalke defeated Will Zalatoris in the first round of match play. He ultimately advanced to the final, where he was defeated by Curtis Luck. The runner-up finish earned Dalke invitations to the 2017 Masters Tournament and the 2017 U.S. Open. Dalke was then selected to represent the United States at the 2016 Eisenhower Trophy, alongside Maverick McNealy and Scottie Scheffler.

Dalke won his first individual collegiate title at the NCAA Stanford Regional in May 2017, shooting 12-under 198 to win by three strokes. He holed the winning putt for the Oklahoma Sooners in the 2017 NCAA Division I men's golf championship against the Oregon Ducks. In March 2018, Dalke won his second individual collegiate title at the Lone Star Invitational. He ended his junior season with a scoring average of 70.97. Dalke represented the United States at the 2018 Arnold Palmer Cup, where he defeated Viktor Hovland in the Sunday singles.

Toward the end of his junior season, Dalke struggled with his ballstriking. He carried a driver but did not hit it once during the 2018 NCAA Division I men's golf championship and removed driver from his bag while competing in the 2018 U.S. Amateur two months later. He continued to struggle in his senior season with his ballstriking, in particular his driving. Although his collegiate career ended in May 2019, he delayed turning professional until after the 2019 U.S. Amateur in August due to these struggles, stating: "I thought there was no point going out there and [struggling]. If you’re going to work on some things, might as well do that in amateur golf where you’re not wasting money for it, wasting your own money." At the U.S. Amateur, he was eliminated in the round of 16 by Karl Vilips.

== Professional career ==
Dalke competed in qualifying school for the Korn Ferry Tour in October 2019. He shot 8-under at first stage and missed out on advancing to second stage by one stroke. Dalke made his first cut in a professional tournament in August 2020 on the LocaliQ Series, at the Classic at Callaway Gardens, where he finished tied-52nd. Two weeks later, he missed the cut in the Korn Ferry Tour's Evans Scholars Invitational.

Dalke struggled with driver yips at the start of his professional career. He recalled in 2025: "Even in meaningless money games I couldn’t keep it on the planet back then." In total, Dalke made approximately $40,000 across four years as a professional golfer. Unable to attain status on any tour, he lost the backing of his sponsors and ran out of money. He said in 2024: "I was constantly stressed out, emotionally drained, and I got to a point where I didn’t want to play tournaments anymore. The odds are most of the guys playing mini tours probably won’t make it, but I was clinging to the dream until the money ran dry. And after it ran out, there was nothing I could do."

As his attempt to play professional tournaments stalled, Dalke began filming videos alongside Good Good, a YouTube channel which gained around 1.5 million subscribers as of 2024. He signed a contract to work full-time with Good Good in August 2023. Dalke said in 2026: "Before I was doing YouTube I was struggling and really did not love golf at times and put a lof of pressure on myself. Now I just have fun with it."

In May 2025, the team of Josh Richards, Erik Anders Lang, and Brad Dalke won the third Creator Classic, which was held at the Philadelphia Cricket Club. Dalke went on to win the fourth Creator Classic, held at East Lake Golf Club in August 2025, and received $100,000. Also in 2025, the team of Brad Dalke, Francis Ellis, and Cody "Beef" Franke won the inaugural Internet Invitational, which was held at Big Cedar Lodge in Ridgedale, Missouri. Dalke won one third of the $1 million prize, plus money he won in "skins" during the event.

In June 2026, Dalke made his first start in a world-ranked tournament for six years, after receiving a sponsor exemption in the European Tour's BMW International Open. He opened with a 3-under 69 and followed with a 66 in the second round to move into tied-fifth place, two strokes behind the lead. He faded on the weekend with rounds of 75 and 73 to finish the tournament in a tie for 30th place, which earned him €20,963. The following month, Dalke played in the Rocket Classic on a sponsor exemption, which was his first PGA Tour start in 10 years. He shot rounds of 81-75 to miss the cut.

== Personal life ==
Dalke comes from an athletic family. His father Bill was a starting linebacker for the 1975 Oklahoma Sooners football team, which won the national championship. His mother Kay also attended the University of Oklahoma, where she played golf. Dalke's great-uncles Lloyd and Paul Waner were inducted into the Baseball Hall of Fame.

Dalke and his wife Abbie married in June 2025. He said in June 2026 that his wife suffered two miscarriages in the previous year and that a stroke in December 2025 had partially blinded her. Dalke stated that he was stepping away from his role with Good Good Golf to prioritize time with his family.

== Amateur wins ==
- 2011 Thunderbird International Junior
- 2013 HP Boys, PING Invitational
- 2015 Junior PGA Championship
- 2017 NCAA Stanford Regional
- 2018 UTSA-Lone Star Invitational

== Results in major championships ==
Tournament	2017
Masters Tournament	CUT
U.S. Open	CUT
The Open Championship	
PGA Championship	

Did not play

CUT = missed the half-way cut

== U.S. national team appearances ==
- Junior Ryder Cup: 2014 (winners)
- Eisenhower Trophy: 2016
- Arnold Palmer Cup: 2018 (winners)
