= Rick Shiels =

British professional golf, YouTuber (born 1986)

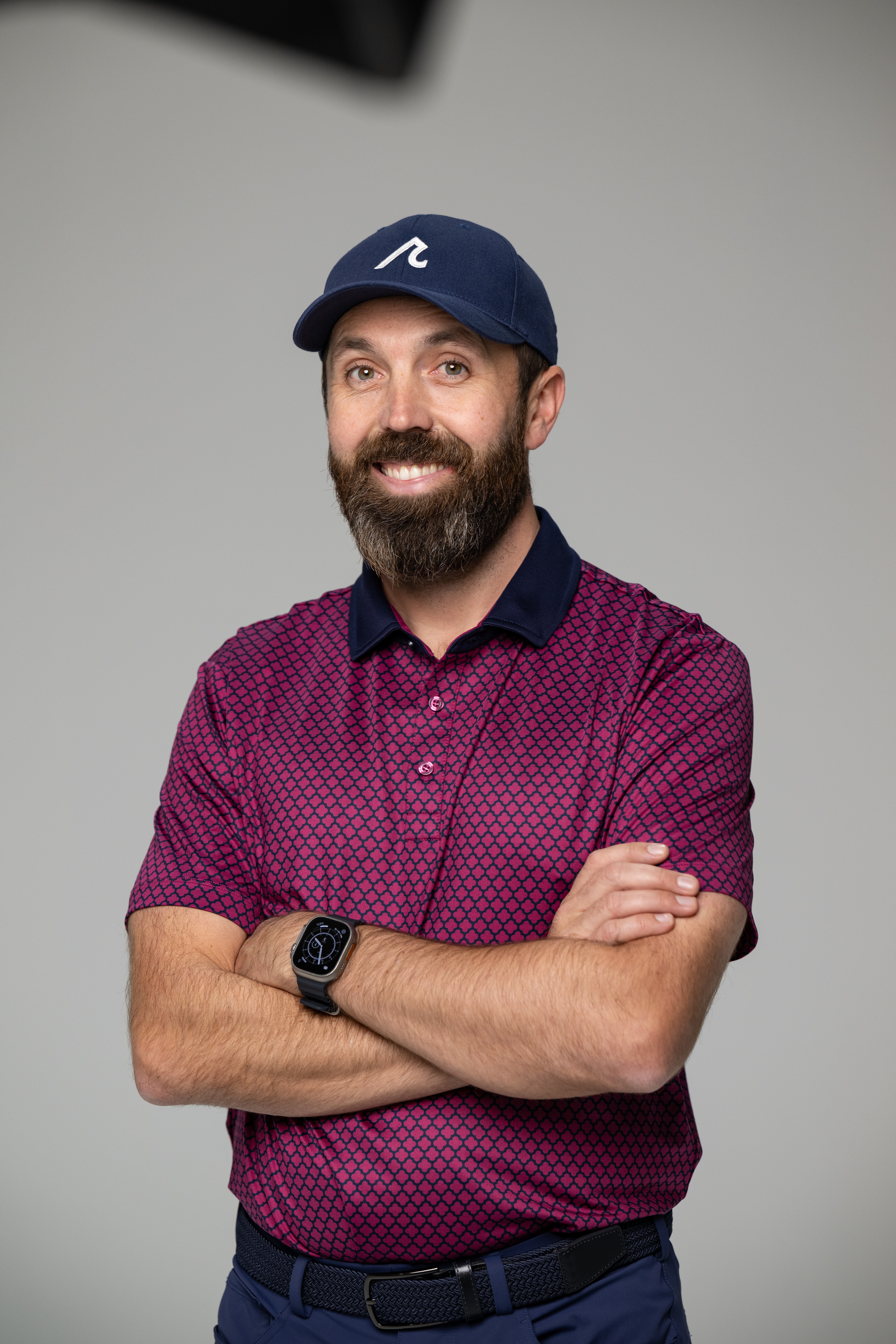
- Shiels in 2019
- Born: 3 July 1986 (age 40); Bolton, England
- Occupations: Golfer; YouTuber
- Years active: 2011–present
- Known for: YouTube channel, Rick Shiels Golf

Rick Shiels (born 3 July 1986) is a British YouTuber and golf professional, best known for his YouTube channel, Rick Shiels Golf. In June 2019, his channel became the largest golf channel on YouTube after surpassing 561,500 subscribers. As of June 2026, he has over 3 million subscribers, and has surpassed 1 Billion channel views, the only golf content creator on YouTube to do so.

== Biography ==
Shiels was born in Bolton, England on 3 July 1986. He began playing golf at Hart Common Golf Club in Westhoughton at the age of 11. He earned a diploma in golf studies at Myerscough College. Ten years after he began playing golf, he started working at Mere Golf and Country Club in Cheshire, England after completing his PGA training and becoming a qualified pro. He then worked at Trafford Golf Centre where, in 2011, he started his YouTube channel, posting videos related to golf as an attempt to gain more customers. In June 2020, he became the first golf vlogger to amass 1 million subscribers. In 2019, Shiels helped host the first YouTube Golf Day, which raised over £15,000 for Prostate Cancer UK. The event gathered 44 creators with over 19 million combined followers. He has also partnered with many large brands like Nike, Inc., Garmin, and Mastercard to create multiple mini-series on his YouTube channel.

His videos have included celebrities like Robbie Williams and Eddie Hall. By April 2021, he had over 1.54 million subscribers on his YouTube channel, with over 374 million views. His channel's content covers many aspects of golf, including golf equipment reviews, instructional tips, golf stories, and more. Shiels also presents a podcast called The Rick Shiels Golf Show and a second YouTube channel of the same name. In February 2021, Shiels announced on his podcast that he had ended his partnership with Nike, but Nike hoped to get Shiels to switch to a 'paid to post' model with Shiels encouraging viewers to buy Nike apparel; not wanting to do this, Shiels decided not to renew the partnership.

As of July 2022, Shiels has a new apparel partnership with the clothing brand Lyle & Scott and Danish shoe brand ECCO.

Early in 2025 Shiels announced he had signed a lucrative contract with LIV Golf to be an Ambassador for Saudi Golf. Shiels made it clear he was not there to play golf himself but rather to advocate for the Saudi league and help to expand its presence and influence in mainstream society.

In August 2025, Shiels participated in the inaugural Internet Invitational, a YouTube golf tournament organized by Barstool Sports and Bob Does Sports. The tournament aired between October and November 2025 and garnered over 25 million views online.

In 2025, Shiels agreed to sponsor a new junior golf tournament at Leigh Golf Club, Culcheth, Warrington, which would become the Rick Shiels Junior Open, with the inaugural event held in August 2026. Having started his own junior golfing journey in the region, Shiels was eager to use his platform to support the next generation of young golfers.

His vision was to give aspiring juniors the opportunity to experience a professionally run tournament, providing a stepping stone just below the elite level of junior golf.

The inaugural Open attracted 90 juniors from across the UK, representing 37 clubs. Among the field were 20 single-figure handicappers, underlining the quality of the competition. Demand for places was exceptionally high, with organisers ultimately having to cap entries to ensure the tournament could be delivered to the highest possible standard.

Rick Shiels Junior Open 2026
