= BizNasty Does BC =

Web series by Pasha Eshghi and Paul Bissonette

- Genre: Mockumentary
- Created by: Pasha Eshghi; Paul Bissonnette
- Written by: Pasha Eshghi; Paul Bissonnette
- Directed by: Pasha Eshghi; Paul Bissonnette
- Starring: Paul Bissonnette
- Composer: Samuel Kim
- Country of origin: Canada
- Original language: English
- No. of seasons: 1
- No. of episodes: 5

Production
- Producer: Pasha Eshghi
- Cinematography: Leo Zuckerman
- Running time: 11 minutes

BizNasty Does BC is a Canadian web series created by Pasha Eshghi and Paul Bissonnette. It follows Bissonnette across the province of British Columbia as he explores it alongside 17 past and present NHL stars.

The series was acquired by Barstool Sports and released on May 14, 2018. The series has been credited with showing a lighter side of NHL players that is often hidden from the public eye.

== Cast ==
- Paul Bissonnette as himself
- Sam Reinhart as himself
- Morgan Rielly as himself
- Shane Doan as himself
- Brendan Gallagher as himself
- Shea Weber as himself
- Seth Jones as himself
- Tyson Barrie as himself
- Connor McDavid as himself
- Scottie Upshall as himself
- Erik Gudbranson as himself
- Jason Garrison as himself
