= Spittin' Chiclets =

American sports podcast

- Genre: Ice hockey, sports comedy
- Language: English

Cast and voices
- Hosted by: Ryan Whitney; Paul Bissonnette; Keith Yandle; Mike Grinnell

Production
- Length: 120–200 minutes

Publication
- Original release: August 14, 2016
- Provider: Barstool Sports
- Updates: Tuesdays

Related
- Website: www.barstoolsports.com/shows/18/spittin-chiclets

Spittin' Chiclets is an ice hockey podcast airing once a week produced by Barstool Sports. It is hosted by former National Hockey League players, Paul "Biz Nasty" Bissonnette, Ryan Whitney and Keith Yandle. The podcast debuted on October 14, 2016, and has since become the most popular hockey podcast in the world. The success of the podcast has led to Bissonnette becoming a contributor for the NHL on TNT, Whitney becoming a contributor for NHL Network and the creation of Big Deal Brewing by Labatt, and Pink Whitney Vodka by New Amsterdam which has annual sales of over 100 million dollars.

== History ==
Spittin' Chiclets is a Barstool Sports podcast launched in October 2016 by former NHL player Ryan Whitney and Barstool hockey blogger Brian "Rear Admiral" McGonagle. (The name derives from "spitting chiclets", a slang term for spitting broken teeth onto the ice following a hard blow to the mouth.)

The podcast began as an "Average Joe" interviewing a former NHL player to learn the behind the scenes truth of playing in the NHL. In the 13th episode of the series, former NHL 4th liner Paul Bissonnette joined as the shows third host for one episode, and would officially join in April 2018. The show quickly gained popularity due to its recurring guests of NHL players, humor and banter between the hosts. Spittin' Chiclets is currently among the most popular sports podcasts in the United States and is in the top 5 most popular podcasts in Canada of any genre.

On January 14, 2025, it was announced on the podcast that Keith Yandle would be joining the show full time. It was also announced that Whitney, Bissonnette, Yandle and producer Mike Grinnell would be part-owners in new ECHL team, the Greensboro Gargoyles.

The podcasters participate in YouTube golf events known as Sandbagger Invitationals with other former NHL players and other content creators. Whitney, Bissonnette, and Yandle all participated in the inaugural Internet Invitational, which was a Youtube golf event organized by Barstool Sports and Bob Does Sports.

The video version of the podcast began airing exclusively on Netflix beginning on January 12, 2026.

== Pink Whitney ==
Pink Whitney is a brand of vodka launched as a joint venture between Barstool Sports and E & J Gallo Winery's New Amsterdam Vodka label. The idea for the drink was spawned during an ad read for New Amsterdam Vodka where the hosts were asked how they drink their vodka. Host Ryan Whitney would answer that he mixes his vodka with pink lemonade and that anyone with "any brains" “any balls" and "any sort of confidence" would do the same. Fans of the show quickly began mixing pink lemonade with their vodka inspiring New Amsterdam Vodka and Barstool Sports to partner to create the drink for commercial sale. The drink became a massive success and now annually sells over 100 million dollars' worth of vodka and is North America's fastest growing flavored vodka brand.

== Big Deal Brew ==
In 2022, in conjunction with Labatt, Spittin' Chiclets announced a beer venture named Big Deal Brewing, deriving from the popular slogan that the podcast coined. The first beer was the Golden Ale which hit shelves in October 2022.

== Spin-Off ==
In October 2022, at a live show in Pittsburgh, it was announced that the podcast would have a once-a-month spin-off show titled Chiclets Game Notes. (Originally titled Chiclets Etc.) with Whitney and Bissonnette's former teammates Colby Armstrong and Matt Murley, who already was appearing on the show on a semi-regular basis as a gambling analyst. The show has since evolved to being produced once per week during the NHL season and daily during the playoffs. Segments include "Show or Minzies", "Riding the Bus", "Beer League Heroes", and Murley's weekend gambling picks segment EBR (Everybody Rides).

In February 2024, the NHL on TNT aired an alternative broadcast of a game between the Florida Panthers and Pittsburgh Penguins on TruTV, hosted by Bissonnette and the podcast's panel.
