= Internet Invitational =

Golf tournament in the United States

Tournament information
- Location: Ridgedale, Missouri, United States
- Established: 2025
- Course: Big Cedar Lodge
- Organized by: Barstool Sports and Bob Does Sports

Current champion
- Fat Perez, Sam Riggs Bozoian, Bobby Ray

The Internet Invitational is a golf tournament conducted by Barstool Sports and YouTuber Bob Does Sports. It features various social media golf personalities such as Paige Spiranac, Grant Horvat, and Wesley Bryan.

== 2025 Internet Invitational ==
The inaugural Internet Invitational took place in August 2025 at Big Cedar Lodge in Ridgedale, Missouri. It contained six episodes which aired over a three-week span in October and November 2025.

The winning team consisted of Brad Dalke, Francis Ellis, and Cody "Beef" Franke, who won over a team consisting of Paige Spiranac, Frankie Borrelli, and Malosi Togisala. The day before the series was set to air, one of the winners, Cody Franke, died while away in Jamaica. Barstool Sports and the Foreplay podcast helped to set up a scholarship fund in his name for golf management at his alma mater, Ferris State University. The three winners split an equal share of one million dollars for winning the event.

The tournament featured 48 content creators, predominantly consisting of YouTube golfers. The tournament took place over three days in August 2025. The first night consisted of an initial draft in which the 48 competitors were drafted into two separate teams of 24 people with Robby "Bob" Berger and Sam "Riggs" Bozoian captaining the two teams.

Team Bob	Overall Selection
Robby Berger	Captain
Wesley Bryan	1st
Grant Horvat	4th
Luke Kwon	5th
Garrett Clark	8th
Nick Stubbe	9th
Mason Nutt	12th
Josh Kelley	13th
Rick Shiels	16th
Mac Boucher	17th
Ryan Whitney	20th
Jake Adams	21st
Matt Scharff	24th
Andrew Santino	25th
Claire Hogle	28th
Joseph Demare	29th
Keith Yandle	32nd
Matthew Haag	33rd
Dalton Smith (Daltoosh)	36th
Jon Gruden	37th
Trent Ryan	40th
Paul Bissonnette	41st
Kylie Cox	44th
Eric Sollenberger	45th

Team Riggs	Overall Selection
Sam Bozoian (Riggs)	Captain
George Bryan IV	2nd
Brad Dalke	3rd
Micah Morris	6th
Peter Finch	7th
Roger Steele	10th
Kyle Berkshire	11th
Cole Lantz	14th
Malosi Togisala	15th
Carter Smith (DOD King)	18th
Paige Spiranac	19th
Bubbie Broders	22nd
Gabriella DeGasperis	23rd
Chaz Bowkers	26th
Francis Ellis	27th
Frankie Borrelli	30th
Lacey Snell	31st
Sara Winter	34th
Andrew Austen	35th
Cody "Beef" Franke	38th
Benjamin Shicker (The Jet)	39th
Chandler Hollow	42nd
The Duke	43rd
Josh Richards	46th

=== Day One ===
==== Morning scramble ====
Team Riggs	Results	Team Bob
Beef/Togisala	2 & 1	Boucher/Joey Cold Cuts
DOD King/Winter	1 Up	Fat Perez/Hogle
Berkshire/Gabby	1 up	Kelley/Sharff
Borrelli/Broders	4 & 3	Kwon/PFT
Lantz/Riggs	2 & 1	Nutt/Yandle
G. Bryan/Chaz	1 up	W. Bryan/Bob
Ellis/Snell	4 & 2	Shiels/Santino
Morris/Austen	3 & 2	Adams/Whitney
Finch/The Jet	2 & 1	Clark/Nadeshot
The Duke/Richards	3 & 2	Sketch/Ryan
Dalke/Hallow	4 & 3	Gruden/Biz
Steele/Spiranac	3 & 2	Horvat/Daltoosh
8	Session	4
8	Overall	4

==== Afternoon alternate shot ====
Team Riggs	Results	Team Bob
Riggs/Lantz	1 up	Shiels/Santino
Borrelli/Broders	1 Up	Kwon/Gruden
DOD King/Winter	1 up	Boucher/Joey Cold Cuts
G. Bryan/Chaz	4 & 3	W. Bryan/Bob
Morris/Ellis	halved	Horvat/Daltoosh
Finch/The Jet	2 & 1	Ryan/Scharff
Richards/The Duke	3 & 2	Yandle/Biz
Beef/Hallow	3 & 2	Kelley/Sketch
Togisala/Snell	2 & 1	Clark/Hogle
Spiranac/Steele	2 & 1	Adams/Whitney
Berkshire/Gabby	2 & 1	PFT/Nadeshot
Dalke/Austen	3 & 2	Fat Perez/Nutt
5 1/2	Session	6 1/2
13 1/2	Overall	10 1/2

The first day consisted of two sessions (morning and afternoon) of 9 holes each for the 12 pairs of competitors on each team. The morning session was a scramble format and the afternoon session was in an alternate shot format. Team Riggs won the first day and Team Bob was eliminated from the tournament.

=== Day Two ===
==== Morning scramble ====
Team Frankie	Results	Team Riggs
Morris/Ellis	2 & 1	Riggs/Lantz
Snell/Richards	3 & 1	Austen/The Duke
DOD King/Togisala	4 & 2	Berkshire/Gabby
Borrelli/Broders	2 up	Winter/Chaz
Beef/Dalke	4 & 3	Steele/Hallow
Sprianac/Finch	1 up	G. Bryan/The Jet
2	Session	4
2	Overall	4

==== Afternoon alternate shot ====
Team Frankie	Results	Team Riggs
Dalke/Snell	3 & 2	Berkshire/Gabby
Broders/Togisala	1 up	Chaz/Winter
Borrelli/Ellis	4 & 3	Riggs/Austen
DOD King/Morris	4 & 2	Hallow/The Duke
Sprianac/Finch	4 & 3	G. Bryan/The Jet
Beef/Richards	5 & 3	Steele/Lantz
5	Session	1
7	Overall	5

The second day had the same format for the remaining 24 players. The new captains were Frankie Borelli and Riggs. Team Frankie won the second day and his team of 12 players went onto the semi-finals on day three.

=== Day Three ===
==== Semi-finals alternate shot ====
Advanced to finals

Place	Player	Score	To par
T1	Spiranac/Borrelli/Togisala	58	+4
T1	Dalke/Beef/Ellis	58	+4
3	Finch/DOD King/Richards	62	+8
4	Morris/Broders/Snell	67	+13

==== Final Match ====
Team Dalke	Results	Team Spiranac
Dalke/Beef/Ellis	1 up	Spiranac/Togisala/Borrelli

Team Dalke wins Internet Invitational

==== Scorecard ====
Hole	1	2	3	4	5	6	7	8	9	10	11	12	13	14	15	16	17	18
Par	4	3	4	5	3	4	4	5	4	3	4	4	5	4	4	3	4	5
Team Dalke			AS				AS		AS			1 Up		1 Up	2 Up	1 Up		1 Up
Team Spiranac	1 Up				1 Up			1 Up					AS				AS	

Day 3 consisted of an 18-hole round in the morning and an 18-hole round in the afternoon for the remaining 12 competitors who were split into 4 teams of 3. The teams captained by Paige Spiranac and Brad Dalke respectfully went onto the finals.

In addition to originally airing on YouTube, the event later aired on Fox Sports 1 and streamed on the Fox One app.

=== Controversies at 2025 event ===
On the first day of the event, there was a controversy involving golfer, Luke Kwon, a professional golfer on the PGA Tour China. Kwon overslept and missed his tee time. As a result, he was penalized four holes by Dave Portnoy, the host and rules commissioner for the event. When he arrived, he was considered disrespectful to the competition and rude to his partner, PFT Commenter. It was later discovered that Kwon was almost kicked off of his college golf team for similar incidents of oversleeping.

There were two separate cheating allegations in the finals of the event. The first cheating allegations involved Paige Spiranac. Paige tamped down on some fescue to give her partner, Malosi, a better lie on hole 9, which was later communicated by Peter Finch. Paige started crying and claimed that she did not know that she could not improve her lie by tamping down the fescue. Her team lost the hole regardless, and no further action against her team was taken.

On hole 10, a further controversy arose when it was alleged that Paige's teammate Malosi was using his slope function on his rangefinder, which was strictly prohibited for the event. Ryan Whitney, a former NHL hockey player and host of Barstool's Spittin' Chiclets podcast, asked Malosi if he was using his slope function on his range finder and Malosi quickly scurried to his golf cart and grabbed his range finder. It could not be determined if he was using the slope function, despite video review, and Malosi denied using slope, so his team was allowed to continue.

== 2026 Internet Invitational ==
The second edition of the Internet Invitational took place August 10–17, 2026 at Big Cedar Lodge in Ridgedale, Missouri for the second year in a row.

The tournament would be released in six episodes with episode one on October 26, episode two on October 29, episode three on November 2, episode four on November 5, episode five on November 9 and the finale on November 12.

The field in 2026 expanded to 64 players, again featured content creators, predominantly consisting of YouTube golfers but also included former professional athletes. Golfers were then placed into groups of four based on skill level and golf indexes, then the field of 64 voted on one group of four golfers to be the captains each of the four different teams. The captains would then go on to select their team of 16 golfers (including themselves) and play a 100-yard hole designed by Big Cedar Lodge, with the four captains playing a closest to the pin with the winner being allowed to select one of the other three remaining teams to play on day one, plus each member of the winning team receiving $5,000.

The group of Captains selected were: Wesley Bryan (Team Green), Brad Dalke (Team Red), Peter Finch (Team Blue) and Ryan Ruffels (Team White). It was also announced before the team selections that The Hershey Company was sponosoring a hole-in-one hole, that would alternate each day, a $500,000 cash prize to the first contestant to hit a hole-in-one. The snake draft order was determined by Dave Portnoy flipping a sharpie, with Team Dalke receiving the first pick, Team Bryan going second, Team Finch going third, Team Ruffels selecting fourth and the order then reversing each round until each team was selected.

The rules officials for the tournament would be: Dave Portnoy, Big Cat & Kevin Kisner.

Team Dalke	Overall Selection
Brad Dalke	Captain
Paul Bissonnette	57th
Garrett Clark	9th
Dalton Smith (Daltoosh)	48th
Carter Smith (DOD King)	17th
Johnny Manziel	25th
Mason Nutt	16th
Hailey Ostrom	33rd
Karol Priscilla	56th
Josh Richards	49th
Andrew Santino	24th
Tae Koh	8th
Tyler Toney	32nd
Luke Toomey	1st
Sara Winter	41st
Keith Yandle	40th

Team Bryan	Overall Selection
Wesley Bryan	Captain
Tisha Alyn	31st
Sabrina Andolpho	39th
Robby Berger	47th
George Bryan IV	2nd
Mac Boucher	18th
Chaz Bowker	23rd
Callum Turner (Callux)	55th
Seb Carmichael-Brown	26th
Max Van der Aarde (Cheddy)	42nd
Kyle Forgeard	50th
Claire Hogle	34th
Cole Lantz	15th
Eric Sollenberger	58th
Sam Heung Min	7th
Evan Thompson	10th

Team Finch	Overall Selection
Peter Finch	Captain
Martin Borgmeier	22nd
Frankie Borrelli	38th
Francis Ellis	35th
Jersey Jerry	59th
Benjamin Shicker	51st
Joseph Demare	46th
Josh Kelley	14th
Luke Kwon	3rd
Cassandra Meyer	30th
Trent Ryan	54th
Daniel Saloner (Short Game King)	27th
Rick Shiels	11th
Roger Steele	6th
Malosi Togisala	19th
Jason Williams	43rd

Team Ruffels	Overall Selection
Ryan Ruffels	Captain
Jake Adams	29th
John Melstrom II	12th
Bubbie Broders	37th
The Duke	60th
Nick Stubbe	20th
Justin Gaethje	45th
Jon Gruden	53rd
Grant Horvat	5th
Micah Morris	4th
Bobby Ray	36th
Sam Bozoian (Riggs)	44th
Salim Sirur	52nd
Paige Spiranac	21st
Marissa Wenzler	13th
Ryan Whitney	28th

The day one format was a 9-hole scramble in the morning and 9-hole alternate shot in the afternoon. Each team would then divide into eight two-person teams, with eight total matches per session with each match not using the handicap system and must play from the same teams, each match being worth 1 point. The two winning teams of 32 golfers after the first day would advance and the two losing teams of 32 golfers would be sent home. Team Ruffels won the closest to the hole competition and selected to play against Team Finch on day one, with Team Bryan and Team Dalke being left over.

Following the morning scramble, the rules committee determined if a team was putting out a group with the intention of not trying to win that match, they had the ability to veto and force the teams to repick.

Day one was played on Ozarks National, day two and three have yet to be annnounced. The format for the remaining days have yet to be announced.

=== Day One ===
==== Morning scramble ====
Team Finch	Results	Team Ruffels
Borrelli/Ellis	halved	Broders/Wenzler
Steele/Short Game King	4 & 2	Spiranac/Ray
Finch/The Jet	4 & 3	Horvat/Riggs
Jersey Jerry/Ryan	5 & 3	Morris/Whitney
Borgmeier/Kelley	2 & 1	Ruffels/Gaethje
Kwon/Williams	1 up	Big John/Fat Perez
Shiels/Joey Cold Cuts	2 & 1	Adams/Salim
Meyer/Togisala	4 & 3	Gruden/The Duke
4 1/2	Session	3 1/2
4 1/2	Overall	3 1/2

Team Dalke	Results	Team Bryan
Dalke/Toney	halved	G. Bryan/Bowker
Taco Golf/Daltoosh	halved	Boucher/Andolpho
Manziel/Priscilla	4 & 2	Alyn/Thompson
Nutt/Ostrom	3 & 2	Heung Min/Hogle
Bissonnette/Yandle	3 & 2	Cheddy/Forgeard
Clark/Winter	4 & 3	Lantz/Carmichael-Brown
DOD King/Santino	2 & 1	W. Bryan/Berger
Tooms/Richards	3 & 2	PFT Commenter/Callux
2	Session	6
2	Overall	6

==== Afternoon alternate shot ====
Team Finch	Results	Team Ruffels
Jerry/Trent	1 up	Salim/The Duke
Finch/Kelley	1 up	Marissa/Bubbie
Kwon/Malosi	2 & 1	Big John/Fat Perez
Steele/Short Game King	1 up	Horvat/Gaethje
Rick/Martin	4 & 3	Ruffles/Riggs
Borrelli/Ellis	halved	Ray/Gruden
Cass/JWill	3 & 2	Micah/Whitney
Cold Cuts/The Jet	5 & 4	Spiranac/Adams
3 1/2	Session	4 1/2
8	Overall	8

Team Dalke	Results	Team Bryan
Nutt/Richards	3 & 2	Cheddy/Foregard
Manziel/Toney	3 & 2	G. Bryan/Chaz
Yandle/Daltoosh	5 & 4	PFT/Callux
Dalke/Priscilla	halved	Alyn/Thompson
Ostrom/Tooms	halved	Boucher/Sabrina
Clark/Winter	3 & 1	Lantz/Carmichael-Brown
Santino/DOD King	halved	Hueng Min/Hogle
Taco/Biz	4 & 3	W. Bryan/Berger
3 1/2	Session	4 1/2
5 1/2	Overall	10 1/2

==== Playoff ====
Team Finch	Results	Team Ruffels
Finch/Kwon	halved	Ruffels/Morris
Steele/Shiels	1 up	Horvat/Big John

Team Ruffels wins on second playoff hole

Team Bryan (green) defeated Team Dalke (red) 10.5 to 5.5, which eliminated 16 players (Dalke, Bissonnette, Clark, Daltoosh, DOD King, Manziel, McNutt, Ostrom, Priscilla, Richards, Santino, Taco Golf, Toney, Tooms, Winter & Yandle).

Team Finch (blue) and Team Ruffels (white) ended day one tied 8 to 8, after Borrelli and Ellis halved their match with Ray and Gruden. A sudden death playoff was used to decide which team would advance. Each team picked their top two players to compete in a one hole alternate shot playoff, if that match was still tied, the teams would select two golfers again to compete re-play the hole, with players ineligible to compete in back to back holes. This would continue until a winner was determined.

Team Finch selected Peter Finch and Luke Kwon against Team Ruffels who selected Ryan Ruffels and Micah Morris. After both drives went into a fairway bunker, Ruffels hit his approach shot onto the green, and Team Ruffels proceeded to 2 putt from there. Kwon hit his bunker shot to just in front of the green, and after a chip by Finch, sank the par putt to half the hole. Teams then had to select two new golfers to re-play the 18th hole, with Team Finch selecting Rick Shiels and Roger Steele & Team Ruffels selecting Grant Horvat and Big John. Steele's drive landed in the fairway, while John's landed in the fairway bunker. After Shiels hit his approach shot onto the green, and Horvat cleanly got onto the green out of the bunker, both teams were left with birdie putts. Steele went first, and missed his short. Big John then holed his birdie putt for Team Ruffels to advance to day two and eliminate Team Finch (Finch, Borgmeier, Borrelli, Ellis, Jersey Jerry, The Jet, Joey Cold Cuts, Kelley, Kwon, Meyer, Ryan, Short Game King, Shiels, Steele, Togisala & Williams).

=== Day Two ===
Similar to day one, the teams were divided into two equal teams but it was ultimately decided that Team Bryan (green) and Team Ruffels (white) wanted to keep their same respective teams. The morning format was also the same as day one, a two-person scramble, with the afternoon format being changed to sixteen singles matches. Both teams would be required to submit each of their eight two-person teams and the pairings would be matched by the rules committee of Portnoy, Kizner & Big Cat. It was also announced by Portnoy that ninth hole would be worth $50,000 ($25,000 per player), if the hole was halved the money would carry over to the next group and once the hole was won, the money would be split amongst the winner players for that hole plus all their teammates who tied the ninth hole in front of them. All groups would be required to play the ninth hole regardless if their match was finished, by either skipping to the ninth hole or continuing to finish their round. They also added in the stipulation both teams could use a celebrity shot by Kisner but it was only one shot per team for all eight matches but it could not be used on the ninth hole.

==== Morning scramble ====
Team Bryan	Results	Team Ruffels	Ninth Hole Result
Cheddy/Foregard	3 & 2	The Duke/Ray	The Duke/Ray
PFT Commenter/Callux	2 & 1	Gruden/Salim	halved
Heung Min/Hogle	halved	Morris/Whitney	halved
Lantz/Carmichael-Brown	halved	Horvat/Gaethje	halved
Boucher/Sabrina	1 up	Spiranac/Adams	Spiranac/Adams
Alyn/Thompson	2 up	Marissa/Bubbie	Marissa/Bubbie
G. Bryan/Chaz	2 & 1	Big John/Fat Perez	halved
W. Bryan/Berger	1 up	Ruffels/Riggs	halved
2	Session	6
2	Overall	6

==== Afternoon Singles ====
Team Bryan	Results	Team Ruffels
Cheddy	halved	Riggs
Berger	4 & 3	Gaethje
Heung Min	3 & 2	Big John
W. Bryan	halved	Ruffels
Hogle	1 up	Spiranac
Boucher	4 & 3	Bubbie
Thompson	1 up	Horvat
G. Bryan	halved	Morris
Foregard	1 up	Salim
PFT Commenter	3 & 2	Gruden
Carmichael-Brown	2 & 1	Fat Perez
Sabrina	–	Whitney
Chaz	–	Marissa
Lantz	–	Adams
Alyn	–	Ray
Callux	–	The Duke
4 1/2	Session	6 1/2
6 1/2	Overall	12 1/2

The final five matches went unfinished after Salim defeated Foregard to give Team Ruffels (white) the 12.5 points needed to win and advanced to the next stage of the tournament.

Portnoy announced the four more golfers from Team Ruffels would be also eliminated. They selected four captains: Big John, Grant Horvat, Micah Morris and Ryan Ruffels, who would then snake draft their teams with players being ranked 1–4. Each team would send their No. 1 player to play the first hole, with the lowest score and ties being safe from elimination. If one team had the worst score, those four players from that team would be eliminated. The remaining teams would send their No. 2 players out to play the second hole, with the lowest score and ties being safe from elimination. If multiple teams were still not eliminated, the remaining teams would send their No. 3 players out to play the third hole, with the lowest score and ties being safe from elimination. No. 4 players were not playing and the order would start back over with the teams No. 1 golfer. Big John (Red) drafted first, Team Horvat (Green) drafted second, Team Morris (Blue) drafted third and Team Ruffels (White) drafted fourth in the snake style draft.

Team Big John	Overall Selection
Big John	Captain
Fat Perez	1st
Riggs	8th
Bobby Ray	9th

Team Horvat	Overall Selection
Grant Horvat	Captain
Jake Adams	2nd
Paige Spiranac	7th
Jon Gruden	10th

Team Morris	Overall Selection
Micah Morris	Captain
Ryan Whitney	3rd
Bubbie Broders	6th
Salim	11th

Team Ruffels	Overall Selection
Ryan Ruffels	Captain
Marissa Wenzler	4th
Justin Gaethje	5th
The Duke	12th

=== Day Two Elimination ===
==== One Hole Best Ball ====
Advanced After Hole 1
Advanced After Hole 2
Eliminated

Place	Player	Score	To par
T1	Team Ruffles	4	–1
T1	Team Big John	4	–1
3	Team Morris	9	E
4	Team Horvat	10	+1

After all four of the No. 1 players teed off on the first hole, Ryan Ruffles and Big John both made birdie to advance to the next round while Grant Horvat and Micah Morris both made par. On the next hole Ryan Whitney made par for Team Morris to advance while Jake Adams made bogey which eliminated Team Horvat: Grant Horvat, Jake Adams, Paige Spiranac and Jon Gruden.

=== Day Three ===
The day three format was four teams of three, 9 hole matches of alternate shot stroke play with the top two teams advancing to the finals. The top two teams would play an 18 hole alternate shot match play to determine the winner. The rules committee of Portnoy, Big Cat and Kizner along with help from other golfers selected the four three person teams as fair as possible. They would be playing Payne's Valley as the course for all the remaining matches.

Team Fat Perez(blue) shot a two over 38, while Team Big John(red) shot a three over 39 to advanced to the 18-hole match play alternate shot.

Team Ruffels (White)
Ryan Ruffels
Marissa Wenzler
The Duke

Team Big John (Red)
Big John
Ryan Whitney
Salim

Team Micah (Green)
Micah Morris
Bubbie Broders
Justin Gaethje

Team Fat Perez (Blue)
Fat Perez
Riggs
Bobby Ray

==== Morning Alternate Shot Stroke Play ====
Hole	1	2	3	4	5	6	7	8	9	Score
Par	4	3	4	5	3	4	4	5	4	36
Team Fat Perez	5	3	5	4	3	4	4	5	5	38 (+2)
Team Big John	5	4	4	4	3	6	4	5	5	40 (+4)
Team Micah	4	4	4	6	3	6	4	5	5	41 (+5)
Team Ruffels	5	6	4	4	3	5	5	6	5	43 (+7)

==== Final Match ====
Team Fat Perez	Results	Team Big John
Fat Perez/Riggs/Bobby Ray	5 & 3	Big John/Whitney/Salim

Team Fat Perez wins the Internet Invitational

===== Scorecard =====
Hole	1	2	3	4	5	6	7	8	9	10	11	12	13	14	15	16	17	18
Par	4	3	4	5	3	4	4	5	4	3	4	4	5	4	4	3	4	5
Team Fat Perez	1 Up		2 Up			2 Up		2 Up	3 Up	4 Up				4 Up	5 Up			
Team Big John				1 Dn			1 Dn						3 Dn					

The team of Fat Perez, Riggs and Bobby Ray defeated the team of Big John, Ryan Whitney and Salim 5 & 3 in the 18-hole alternate shot match play final to win a total prize purse of $4,000,000 split three-ways and also a tracker boat from Bass Pro Shops.

=== Prize Pool ===
Golfer	Money Won
Bobby Ray	$1,363,333
Fat Perez	$1,338,333
Riggs	$1,338,333
Jake Adams	$30,000
Bubbie Broders	$30,000
The Duke	$30,000
Justin Gaethje	$30,000
Jon Gruden	$30,000
Grant Horvat	$30,000
Micah Morris	$30,000
Salim	$30,000
Paige Spiranac	$30,000
Marissa Wenzler	$30,000
Ryan Whitney	$30,000
Big John	$5,000
Ryan Ruffels	$5,000

=== Past Champions ===
Year	Winners
2025	Brad Dalke, Francis Ellis, Cody "Beef" Franke
2026	Fat Perez, Sam Riggs Bozoian, Bobby Ray

== Production ==
Production was led by Fore Play Executive Producer, Brendan Jones, and his team at Barstool Sports. Notable editors include Jake Lasofsky, Kevin Zuppe, Trent Christiansen, Mike DelloStritto, Jared De Libero, and Fore Play Senior Editor Kyle Tims. The team worked through over 24TB of raw footage. They were nominated and a finalist for Best Video Series of 2025 by the Shorty Awards.

The same team produced and edited the 2026 Internet Invitational II set to be released this fall.
