= Gabi Moura =

Brazilian influencer and model (born 2004)

- Driver's license portrait, 2025
- Born: Gabriela Moura; June 18, 2004 (age 22); Niterói, Rio de Janeiro, Brazil
- Occupations: Influencer, model
- Partner: Josh Richards (2023–present)

Instagram information
- Page: gabriela moura
- Years active: 2019–present
- Genres: Dance, vlogging, fashion
- Followers: 3 million

TikTok information
- Page: gabriela moura
- Years active: 2020–present
- Genres: Dance, vlogging, fashion
- Followers: 11.6 million

YouTube information
- Channel: Gabi Moura
- Years active: 2025–present
- Genres: Dance, vlogging, fashion, skits
- Subscribers: 11.8 thousand
- Views: 199 thousand
- Last updated: May 15, 2026

Gabriela Moura (born June 18, 2004) is a Brazilian influencer and model based in the United States. Emigrating to America in her late teens, she was featured at the 2025 Victoria's Secret Fashion Show and was a rookie feature in the 2026 Sports Illustrated Swimsuit Issue. She has a large following on TikTok.

== Early life ==
Gabriela Moura was born on June 18, 2004, in Niterói, located in the State of Rio de Janeiro. She was raised as a de facto only child; (Note: Moura has stated that she has an older brother from her father's side, Gabriel, whom she didn't grow up with.) her parents divorced when she was seven, but remained close. She has stated that since her childhood, she wanted to leave Brazil and preferably move to the United States or Canada. After being unable to afford to go to California for her junior year of high school on a foreign exchange program, she was set to come to the United States on a host family program, staying in Kimberling City, Missouri; however, the COVID-19 pandemic rendered the exchange unviable. After attempting to get into another exchange program for her senior year, which she was unable to do so due to a lack of available host families, she went to a Brazilian marketing school. Unprepared for Brazilian college (she had been studying for the SAT instead of the Brazilian equivalent ENEM) and still wanting to move to the US, she quit marketing school and took a gap year. She first arrived in the United States in 2023 with the help of a friend, taking a two-week trip to Los Angeles, and eventually settling there after getting stable work and a visa.

== Career ==
In her late teens, Moura became increasingly active in the digital media space, picking up work in the fashion industry. Posting frequently on TikTok, she initially posted dancing videos and started accumulating a large English-speaking audience in 2021. Despite not being fluent in English, she began gradually learning it as she moved to the United States in 2023. Her career began to take off in 2022, as her follower count online mounted. By 2024, she had amassed 10 million followers on TikTok, and by 2026, nearly 12 million on TikTok and 3 million on Instagram.

Among her many dreams as a fashion industry worker in the US was being a Victoria's Secret model. When the brand revived its Victoria's Secret Fashion Show in 2024, they sought to bring new changes for its revamped version; in 2025, this included bringing in influencers to walk the runway. Moura was selected to be one of them, as well as the American personality Quenlin Blackwell. When Moura discovered this, she was ecstatic, as well as her mother, who she described as being tearful. Despite this, the move to include influencers alongside recognized models was criticized as cheapening the fashion industry by some, though this received pushback as influencers have become more prominent.

Six months later, Moura made her debut as a model for the Sports Illustrated Swimsuit Issue in 2026, being a rookie. Her photoshoot was done in Fort Myers, Florida. Afterwards, she attended that year's Miami Swim Week. In addition to runway fashion, she has also partnered with brands such as Neutrogena, Yves Saint Laurent, L’Oreal, and Meta.

Moura has frequently garnered attention for her social media posts at prominent events. In particular, she was criticized in 2025 for her appearance at that year's Kentucky Derby, where she wore a revealing mint-green dress that featured a tight bodice and ruffled skirt. Derided for what some labeled as inappropriate attire for the Derby, Moura responded by stating her dress only aroused a negative response due to her large breasts, which she could not hide, and that a woman with smaller breasts would not receive similar accusations of vulgarity. Her response was endorsed by fellow influencers Alix Earle and Livvy Dunne, as well as her boyfriend, Josh Richards. During the 2026 FIFA World Cup, she garnered attention for her support for Brazil, most notably her attendance of the June 13 match against Morocco, being described by some outlets as "Brazil’s sexiest fan".

== Personal life ==
Despite living in America, Moura frequently flies back to Brazil to see family.

In 2021, as she was beginning to gain online traction, Canadian LA-based influencer Josh Richards reached out to her via DMs. They became mutuals in 2022, and physically met in 2023, when he invited her to his 21st birthday party; afterwards, they started dating. The two frequently appear in each other's social media content, and their relationship has received decent media and online attention. They both attended Coachella in 2026.
