= BFFs (podcast) =

American pop culture podcast

- Genre: Sports comedy
- Language: English

Cast and voices
- Hosted by: Josh Richards; Brianna Chickenfry

Production
- Length: 60–120 minutes

Publication
- Original release: October 13, 2020 November 20, 2025
- Provider: Barstool Sports
- Updates: Weekly

Related
- Website: www.barstoolsports.com/shows/134/Bffs

BFFs is an American podcast produced by Barstool Sports. Hosted by Josh Richards and Brianna Chickenfry, the show covers topics relating to pop culture and current events.

== History ==
Dave Portnoy and Richards debuted together in the summer of 2020, with Portnoy appearing on Richards's Instagram account to discuss drama on TikTok. That fall, the two reunited to create BFFs, releasing episodes weekly discussing current events and pop culture and interviewing guests. Within the first ten episodes, Brianna Chickenfry joined as a third host, providing a female perspective on the topics.

Portnoy announced his exit from the podcast in late 2024, leaving Richards and Chickenfry as the remaining hosts. Their first episode in 2025 without Portnoy was released on January 8.

== Notable guests ==
- Landon Barker
- Haley Cavinder
- Hanna Cavinder
- Charli D'Amelio
- Dixie D'Amelio
- Dream
- Bryce Hall
- Jake Paul
- Logan Paul
- Trisha Paytas
- Oz Pearlman
- Andrew Tate
- Theo Von
- Yung Gravy
- Keemstar
