= Collingwood School =

Location
- 70 Morven Drive; West Vancouver, British Columbia, V7S 1B2; Canada; 49.3606°N 123.1201°W; 49.3478°N 123.1854°W

Information
- Funding type: Private
- Motto: Ex Visu Ad Verum (From Vision to Reality)
- Founded: 1984
- Headmaster: Lisa Evans
- Grades: JK-12
- Enrollment: Approx. 1,250
- Language: English
- Campus: Suburban
- Houses: Byrd, Groos, Mack, Houssian, Geer, Senft
- Colours: Blue, Gold and White
- Mascot: Corndog the Cavalier
- Team name: Collingwood Cavaliers
- Website: www.collingwood.org
- Last updated: September 6, 2016

Collingwood School is an independent, non-denominational, co-educational, university-preparatory school founded in 1984. Located in West Vancouver, British Columbia, Canada, it delivers the British Columbia Ministry of Education curriculum from Junior Kindergarten to Grade 12.

== Facilities ==
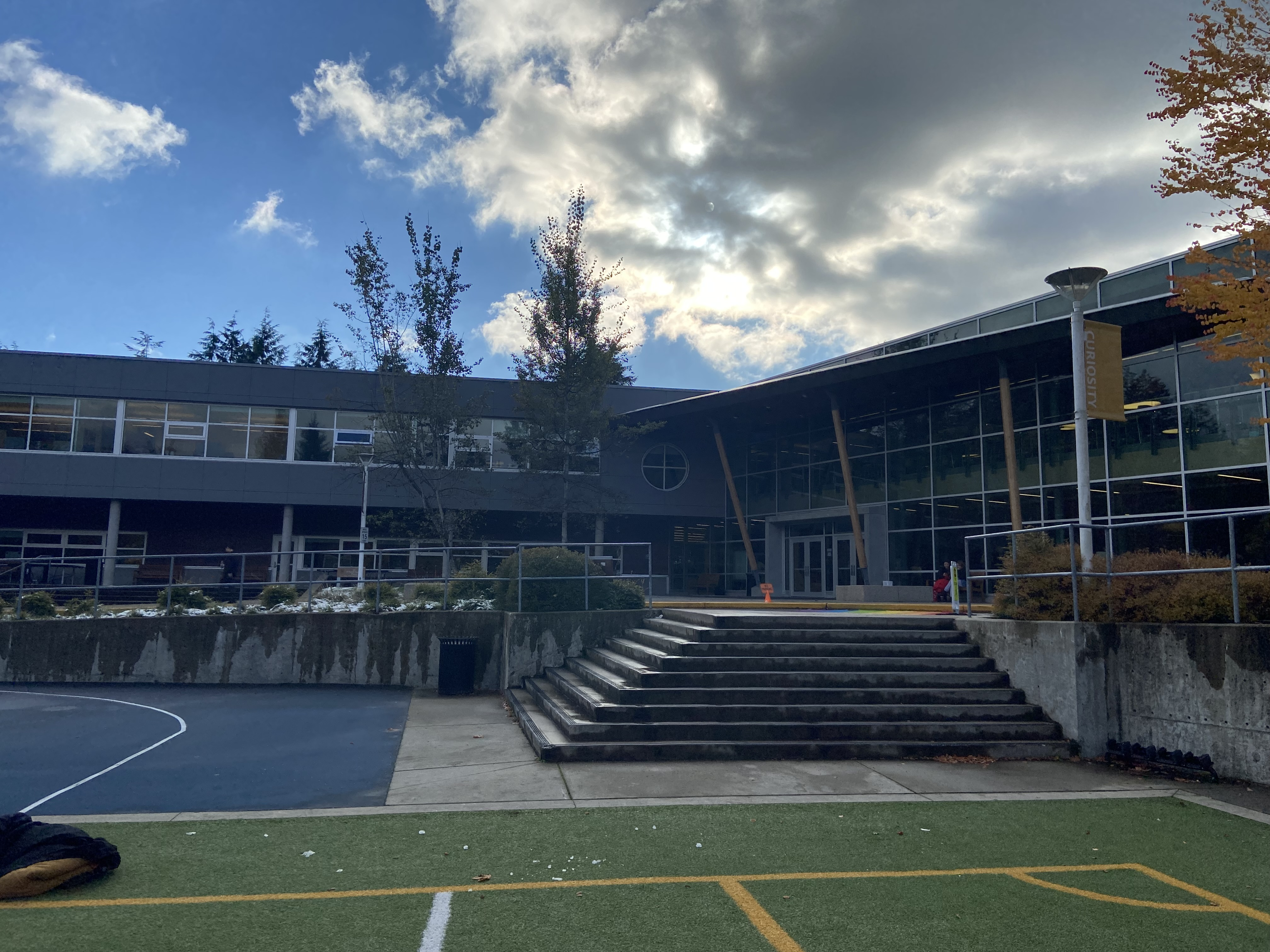
Morven Campus

=== Morven Campus ===
Located at 49.3606°N 123.1201°W.

The Morven campus is the oldest of Collingwood School. It is located at 70 Morven Drive in the British Properties residential area of West Vancouver, and houses Grades 8 and 9 of the Middle School and Grades 10-12 of the Senior School. The buildings previously made up Glenmore Elementary School, which was closed in 1982 along with several other schools in West Vancouver. Parents, students and teachers protested the closure of Glenmore, but were unsuccessful in keeping the school open in the face of declining enrollment and a reduced education budget.

The campus has since seen several expansions and improvements, including a full redevelopment completed in 2014. The redevelopment included a theatre, a dance studio, band and choir facilities, a library, a gymnasium, weight facilities and an athletics field, cafeteria, and learning spaces, all located around an open student commons. Morven is adjacent to Glenmore Park.

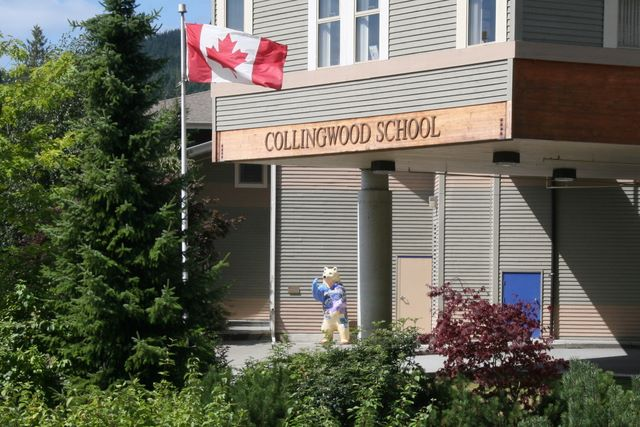
Wentworth Campus

=== Wentworth Campus ===
Located at 49.3478°N 123.1854°W.

Opened in 1997, the junior campus – also known as the "Wentworth" campus – is located at 2605 Wentworth Avenue, in the Cypress area of West Vancouver. It is located in proximity to Cypress Provincial Park. This campus houses all students in the Junior School, which ranges from Junior Kindergarten to Grade 5, and the first two years of Middle School (grades 6 and 7). The school consists of two wings, the Junior Kindergarten-Grade 5 Wing and the Grades 6 and 7 Wing. The Grade 6 and 7 Wing features a full-sized gymnasium and well as two science laboratories.

== Curriculum ==
Collingwood School delivers the British Columbia Ministry of Education Kindergarten to Grade 12 curriculum. In addition to the Ministry of Education requirements, Collingwood also requires that students partake in the Collingwood Certificate program (and the Four Strands approach) and offers multiple Advanced Placement courses.

=== Four Strands ===
Collingwood emphasizes a concept known as the Four Strands. The Four Strands are Academics, Athletics, Service, and the Arts. All students must participate in the Four Strands and many extracurricular activities are offered to fulfill the requirements. Students are recognized with awards if they excel in any of the four categories.

=== Collingwood Certificate ===
The Collingwood Certificate program is a set of higher standards in addition to the BC Ministry of Education's requirements. The Collingwood Certificate program accompanies the Four Strands approach at Collingwood School. The Collingwood Certificate challenges students with respect to their academic achievement, compulsory athletic participation, continued arts enrollment, participation in community service, the graduation portfolio, and overall citizenship at the school. Upon graduation, the Collingwood Certificate diploma is awarded to all those that meet the requirements.

=== Debating, Public Speaking, and Model UN ===
Collingwood's debating and public speaking program has won many provincial, national and international tournaments. Each member (from Grade 1 to Grade 12) is required to write and present a persuasive speech, a humorous speech, or a dramatic monologue each year in the school's annual public speaking competition.

The Morven campus has a Model United Nations club which attends multiple conferences in the Lower Mainland. In recent years they have travelled to Washington, D.C., New York, and Berkeley.

=== Round Square ===
Collingwood is a member of the international Round Square network of schools, which seeks to give every student a variety of academic, physical, cultural and spiritual experiences to enhance their global outlook.

Collingwood annually sends students across the globe on Round Square International Service trips, to destinations such as India, Belize, and Thailand. Projects have included constructing homes, schools, and fresh water collection systems for communities. There is also involvement in local service initiatives, such as Habitat for Humanity. Every year, Collingwood sends a delegation of both staff and students to the International Round Square Conference.

In October 2008, Collingwood School co-hosted the international senior Round Square conference with Glenlyon Norfolk School. Delegates from every Round Square school were billeted with Collingwood families. The theme of the conference was "Creating Sustainable Communities – Local to Global".

== Headmasters ==
- David Mackenzie: David Mackenzie was Collingwood School's first headmaster. A former member of the British Navy and an avid rugby fan, he also re-founded Brentwood College on Vancouver Island.
- Graham Baldwin: Graham Baldwin was Collingwood's Head during its formative years. During his tenure, the school population grew from 200 to 1000 students, and was separated into two campuses.
- Jim Burnett: Jim Burnett was appointed acting Head following the departure of Graham Baldwin and eventually received the position. He was previously a member of the US Olympic track & field team.
- Rodger Wright: Rodger Wright was Head of Collingwood School between 2004 and 2016. He was previously Head of Trinity College School in Port Hope, Ontario.
- Rob Lake: Rob Lake was the Head of Collingwood School from July 2016 to February 2018. He previously served as the Head of Head-Royce School in Oakland, California.
- Lisa Evans: Lisa Evans is the current Head of Collingwood School, following the departure of Rob Lake in February 2018.
- Emily Greenberg: Emily Greenberg was appointed as the 7th Head of Collingwood School by the Board of Governors on April 30, 2026. She will officially start the role on July 15, 2027. Emily will leave her role as the Head of School at Vancouver Talmud Torah in summer 2027.

== Notable alumni ==
- Valerie Teicher (Tei Shi), singer, songwriter, and record producer
- Alexander Ludwig, actor, singer and model
- Pasha Eshghi, filmmaker
- Mackenzie Davis, actress
- Sarah Goldberg, actress
- Ryan Wang, pianist
- Sam Reinhart, hockey player, Florida Panthers
- Alexander Kerfoot, hockey player, Nashville Predators
- Emily Overholt, professional Canadian swimmer

== Arms ==
Coat of arms of Collingwood School

Notes
Granted by the Lyon Court 31 May 1988.
Crest
Issuant from a bar wavy per fess Azure and Argent a demi sun in splendour Or surmounted by two lions' heads erased and addorsed Gules.
Escutcheon
Or a chevron Azure between in chief two lions' heads erased and respectant and in base a stag's head caboshed Gules on a chief enarched Azure three laurel wreaths Or.
Motto
From Vision To Reality (Ex Visu Ad Verum)
