= Willie Colon (American football) =

American football player (born 1983)

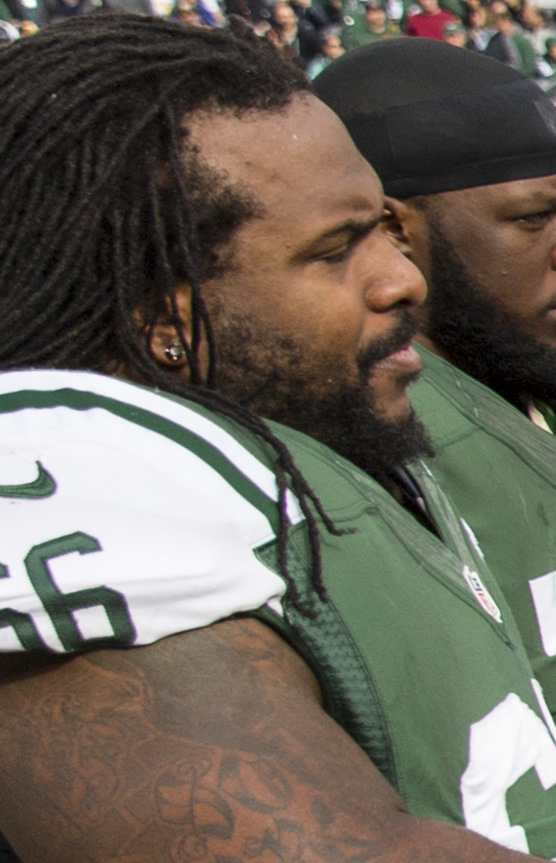
- Colon with the New York Jets in 2014

No. 74, 66
- Position: Offensive guard

Personal information
- Born: April 9, 1983 (age 43); The Bronx, New York, U.S.
- Listed height: 6 ft 3 in (1.91 m)
- Listed weight: 315 lb (143 kg)

Career information
- High school: Cardinal Hayes (Bronx)
- College: Hofstra
- NFL draft: 2006: 4th round, 131st overall pick

Career history
- Pittsburgh Steelers (2006–2012); New York Jets (2013–2015)

Awards and highlights
- Super Bowl champion (XLIII)

Career NFL statistics
- Games played: 100
- Games started: 100
- Stats at Pro Football Reference

Willie Colon (born April 9, 1983) is an American former professional football player who was a guard in the National Football League (NFL). He was selected by the Pittsburgh Steelers in the fourth round of the 2006 NFL draft. He was part of the Steelers' Super Bowl XLIII victory. He played college football for the Hofstra Pride. He currently is a sports analyst for First Things First: OT on Fox Sports 1 (FS1).

== Early life and college ==
Colon was born and raised in Melrose, Bronx. He attended Cardinal Hayes High School in The Bronx. As a senior, he received the Cardinal Hayes Outstanding Defensive Player Award as the defensive MVP. He chose to attend Hofstra, majoring in interdisciplinary studies. Colon is of Puerto Rican descent.

== Professional career ==
=== Pittsburgh Steelers ===
Colon was selected by the Pittsburgh Steelers in the fourth round (131st overall) of the 2006 NFL draft. He started the first two games of his career in Weeks 16 and 17 of the 2006 season, replacing an injured Max Starks. This sparked a position battle with Starks for starting right tackle, which continued through an unspectacular 2007 season. Colon was a member of the Steelers' Super Bowl XLIII championship team of 2008–2009, winning the game against the Arizona Cardinals. He re-signed with the Steelers after the 2008 season for a one-year deal worth $2.2 million.

While working out during the offseason in June 2010, Colon tore his Achilles tendon, forcing him to miss the entire 2010 NFL season.

On July 29, 2011, Colon signed a five-year deal worth $29 million with the Steelers. In week 1 against the Baltimore Ravens, Colon tore his triceps and missed the rest of the season.

Colon was released from the Steelers on March 13, 2013.

=== New York Jets ===
The New York Jets signed Colon to a one–year contract on March 15, 2013. The New York Jets re-signed Colon to a one-year contract worth $2 million on March 19, 2014.

== Television career ==
Colon joined Barstool Sports in 2018 when Barstool launched a 24-hour SiriusXM radio channel. He hosted a morning radio show on the network along with Large, Francis Ellis, and Julie Stewart-Binks. Colon became embroiled in controversy in July of 2020 when he started a podcast with the 'N-word' as the acronym for the show.
