= Ridgedale, Missouri =

Unincorporated community in Missouri, US

Coordinates: 36°30′14″N 93°13′26″W

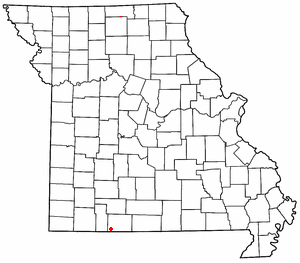

Ridgedale is an unincorporated community in southern Taney County, Missouri, United States. It lies approximately ten miles south of Branson on U.S. Route 65, about one-half mile north of the Arkansas state line. The community is part of the Branson, Missouri Micropolitan Statistical Area.

== History ==
Ridgedale first had a post office in 1912, which closed the same year, and reopened in 1933, since which time it has remained open continuously. The ZIP Code for Ridgedale is 65739.

== Attractions and events ==
Ridgedale contains the Big Cedar Lodge golf resort, owned by Johnny Morris, the owner of Bass Pro Shops and home to the inaugural Internet Invitational.
