= Ryan Whitney (ice hockey) =

American ice hockey player (born 1983)

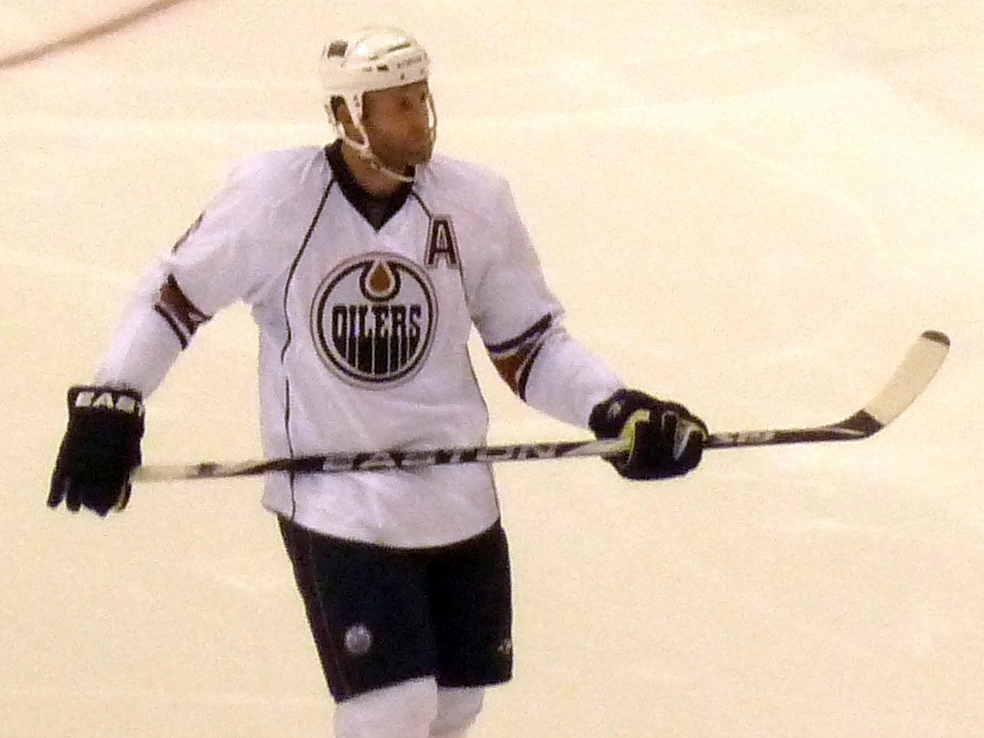
- Whitney with the Edmonton Oilers in 2010
- Born: February 19, 1983 (age 43) Scituate, Massachusetts, U.S.
- Height: 6 ft 4 in (193 cm)
- Weight: 209 lb (95 kg; 14 st 13 lb)
- Position: Defense
- Shot: Left
- Played for: Pittsburgh Penguins; Anaheim Ducks; Edmonton Oilers; Florida Panthers; HC Sochi; Modo Hockey
- National team: United States
- NHL draft: 5th overall, 2002; Pittsburgh Penguins
- Playing career: 2004–2015

Ryan Whitney (born February 19, 1983) is an American former professional ice hockey defenseman. He is currently the co-host of two Barstool Sports podcasts, Spittin' Chiclets with former NHL enforcer Paul Bissonnette and The Unnamed Show with Kirk Minihane & Dave Portnoy. In 2019, New Amsterdam collaborated with Whitney to create a pink lemonade-flavored vodka called Pink Whitney.

Whitney represented the United States in international competitions, winning a silver medal at the 2010 Winter Olympics.

Upon completing his freshman year at Boston University, Whitney was selected by the Pittsburgh Penguins fifth overall in the 2002 NHL entry draft. Following three seasons with the Penguins' minor league affiliate, the Wilkes-Barre/Scranton Penguins, Whitney played his NHL rookie season in 2005–06. Whitney remained in Pittsburgh for three-and-a-half seasons, helping the club to the 2008 Stanley Cup Finals. During the 2008-09 season, Whitney was traded mid-season to the Anaheim Ducks and played 1 1/2 seasons. During the 2009-10 season, Whitney was traded again mid-season to the Edmonton Oilers. Whitney completed 3 1/2 seasons with Edmonton and joined the Florida Panthers for one season 2013-14, his last NHL season. On September 20, 2015, Whitney announced his retirement from professional hockey.

== Playing career ==
=== Early years ===
As a youth, Whitney played in the 1997 Quebec International Pee-Wee Hockey Tournament with a minor ice hockey team from the South Shore.

Whitney enrolled at Thayer Academy, a college-prep school in Braintree, Massachusetts, in 1998, and logged significant playing time with their hockey team. Head Coach Jack Foley often paired Whitney, a freshman, with senior Brooks Orpik, his future rival in college (being on separate ends of the Boston College-Boston University Rivalry), and later his teammate on the Pittsburgh Penguins. Whitney's size and skill drew the attention of the USA Hockey National Team Development Program. After initially resisting the programs invitations, he left Thayer Academy for the program, based in Ann Arbor, Michigan, for his senior year of high school.

After graduating from high school, Whitney accepted a full scholarship to play for Boston University under Jack Parker. He recorded 21 points in 35 games in his freshman year and was named to the 2002 Hockey East All-Rookie Team. He was then selected by the Pittsburgh Penguins, as the fifth overall pick in the 2002 NHL entry draft. Upon completing his third year with Boston, he opted to forgo his senior year of college eligibility to turn professional. He was subsequently assigned by Pittsburgh to their American Hockey League (AHL) affiliate, the Wilkes-Barre/Scranton Penguins, for the 2004 Calder Cup Playoffs. He played in 20 games, recording 10 points, however, Wilkes-Barre/Scranton was defeated by the Milwaukee Admirals in the finals.

Following his professional debut in the AHL playoffs, Whitney joined Wilkes-Barre/Scranton for the 2004–05 season. Under head coach Michel Therrien, Whitney played in 80 games in 2004–05, recording 41 points and 101 penalty minutes.

=== Pittsburgh Penguins ===
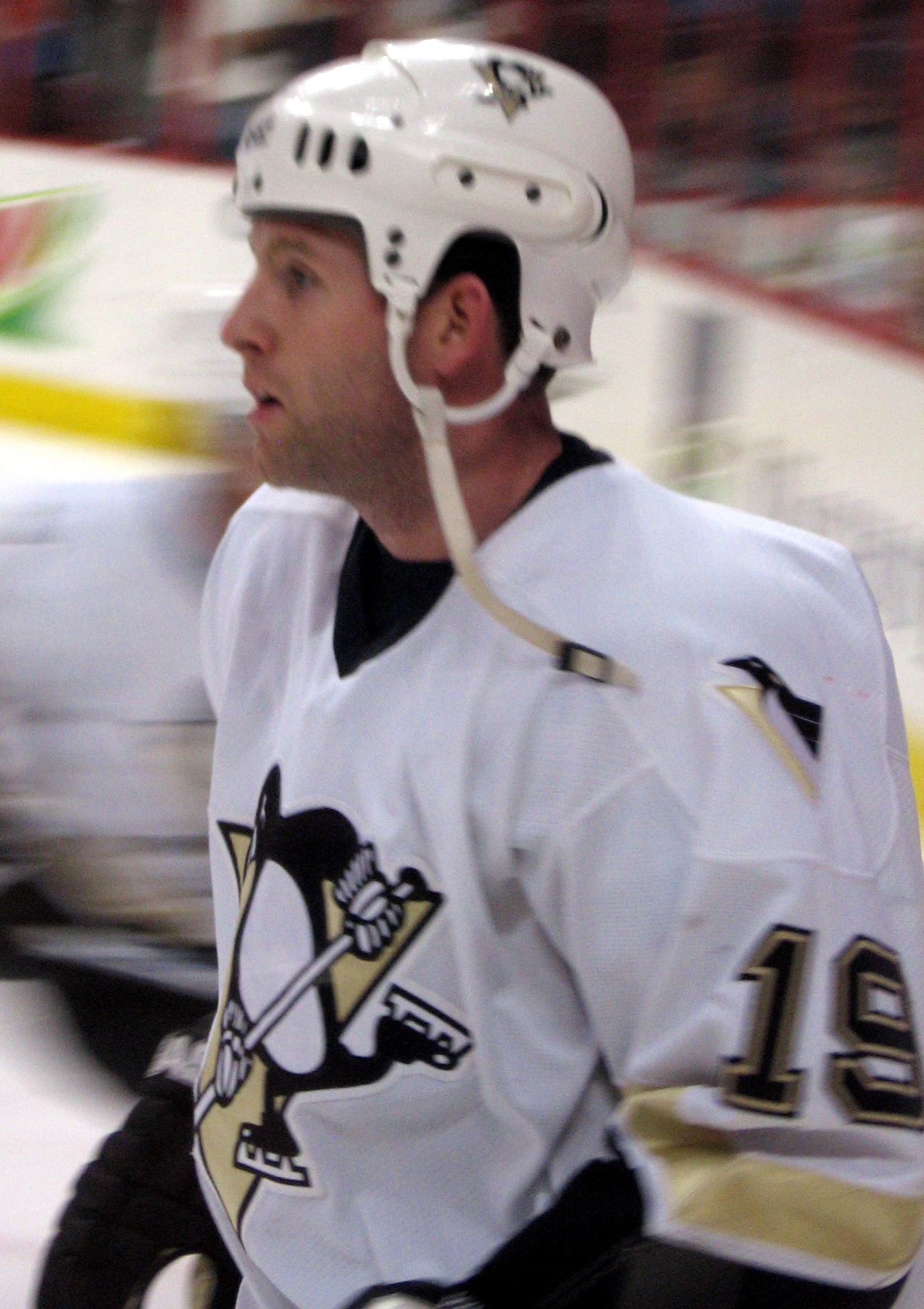
Whitney with the Penguins

Whitney made his NHL debut with Pittsburgh in the 2005–06 NHL season, playing in 68 games. He was called up on October 31, 2005, to replace injured defenseman Dick Tärnström and remained on the team until the season ended. His first NHL goal came on December 1, 2005, against Henrik Lundqvist of the New York Rangers. Whitney finished the season with six goals and 32 assists.

In his second NHL season, Whitney emerged as a top offensive defenseman in the league with 59 points in 2006–07. Under the guidance of new general manager Ray Shero, the Penguins improved from a last-place finish in the Eastern Conference the year before, to a playoff berth, with Whitney part of the youth movement in Pittsburgh that included forwards Sidney Crosby, Evgeni Malkin, Jordan Staal and goaltender Marc-André Fleury.

During the 2007 off-season, Whitney signed a six-year, $24 million contract with a no-trade clause, avoiding his pending restricted free agency. His offensive production dropped in the subsequent 2007–08 season, posting 40 points in 76 games. However, the Penguins finished second in the Eastern Conference and Whitney contributed six points in the 2008 Stanley Cup Playoffs, as Pittsburgh made it to the Finals against the Detroit Red Wings. Pittsburgh was defeated in Game 6 of the series on June 4, 2008.

In the 2008 off-season, it was revealed that Whitney had been suffering from a chronic foot injury throughout the season. It was later discovered Whitney was born with abnormally high arches (hollow foot) in both of his feet. After an attempt using orthopedic inserts in his skates failed, Whitney underwent osteotomy, a surgical procedure to realign the bones in his left foot, on August 15, 2008. It was expected Whitney would miss five months of the 2008–09 season. After playing one game with Wilkes-Barre/Scranton, as part of a conditioning stint, Whitney made his return to Pittsburgh, in a 2–0 loss to the Tampa Bay Lightning, on December 23, 2008.

=== Anaheim Ducks ===
On February 26, 2009, Whitney was traded to the Anaheim Ducks in exchange for Chris Kunitz and Eric Tangradi. He scored one goal and five assists during the 2009 Stanley Cup playoffs, as the Ducks made it to Game 7 of the Western Conference Semi-Finals, losing to the Detroit Red Wings.

=== Edmonton Oilers ===
On March 3, 2010, Whitney was traded along with a 2010 sixth round draft pick (Brandon Davidson) to the Edmonton Oilers in exchange for defenseman Ľubomír Višňovský. The deal marked the second time that Whitney had been traded within a year, even though he had a no-trade clause in his contract.

Whitney made his Oilers debut at Rexall Place on March 5, against the Minnesota Wild. His first goal for his new team would come later in the month, as the Oilers defeated the Detroit Red Wings on March 19. Whitney flourished in his new surroundings, as he finished the 2009–10 season in Edmonton with 11 points in 19 games, one of those goals coming against former team, Anaheim. He also tied with injured winger, Aleš Hemský, as the Oilers team leader for plus-minus totals, with +7.

Whitney underwent a second osteotomy in May 2010, this time to realign the bones in his right foot.

On December 28, 2010, in a game against the Buffalo Sabres, Whitney suffered from a right ankle injury. It was later announced that Whitney would miss the remainder of the 2010–11 season, needing surgery.

On April 28, 2013, it was announced Whitney would not be returning to the Oilers for a fifth season.

=== Florida Panthers ===
On September 29, 2013, Whitney signed a one-year contract with the Florida Panthers. Whitney appeared scoreless in seven games with the Panthers to begin the 2013–14 season before on November 8, 2013, he was placed on waivers. Unclaimed, Whitney was assigned to the Panthers' AHL affiliate, the San Antonio Rampage, for the remainder of the season.

=== Abroad ===
Whitney was an unrestricted free agent following the 2013–14 season. After failing to sign a contract with an NHL team, Whitney made a move to the Kontinental Hockey League (KHL) and on October 16, 2014, he signed a contract with HC Sochi. In the 2014–15 season, Whitney scored 19 points in 42 games in the inaugural season for Sochi. As a free agent, Whitney left Russia after one season and signed a one-year contract with Swedish club Modo Hockey of the SHL on June 24, 2015. Whitney announced his retirement on September 20, 2015 via Twitter.

== International play ==
Medal record

Ice hockey

Representing United States

Olympic Games
Silver medal – second place	2010 Vancouver	

Whitney first represented USA Hockey at the 2000 World U-17 Hockey Challenge. He played six games, and scored his first international goal. The United States finished the tournament in fourth place.

A year later, he would play in the 2001 IIHF U18 Championships. Whitney picked up a single assist, in six games, as the United States finished in sixth place.

The next year, he moved onto the United States' U20 team at the 2002 World Juniors. It was here Whitney picked up his first international goal. He posted 3 points (one goals and two assists) in seven games, as the United States finished in fifth place.

He would also play the following year in the 2003 World Juniors. Whitney posted better numbers than the year previous, picking up five points (one goal and four assists) in seven games, as the United States finished in fourth place.

With injuries to fellow defensemen Paul Martin and Mike Komisarek, Whitney was selected as a replacement to represent the United States in the 2010 Winter Olympic Games, held in Vancouver, British Columbia. This marked Whitney's first time as an Olympic competitor. He and his team were runners-up and won the Silver Medal. It was Whitney's former teammate, Sidney Crosby, who scored the game-winning goal, which saw Canada defeat the United States 3–2, in overtime. Whitney played in all six games, not collecting any points.

During this time, Whitney also wrote a blog and hosted a podcast on Barstool Sports throughout the games, sharing his thoughts, feelings and experiences.

== Post-playing career ==
After completing his hockey career, in October 2016, Whitney began hosting the Spittin' Chiclets podcast at Barstool Sports alongside Brian "Rear Admiral" McGonagle.

In partnership with Barstool Sports, Whitney launched a liquor brand known as Pink Whitney, which was an E & J Gallo Winery brand liquor under their New Amsterdam label.

Alongside his Spittin Chiclets co-hosts, Whitney became part-owner of an ECHL team, the Greensboro Gargoyles.

== Personal life ==
Whitney's younger brother Sean played collegiate hockey at Cornell University from the 2008–09 season to the 2011–12 season.

In June 2022, Whitney went viral on social media for posting a video on Twitter about his frustrations during his time at Toronto Pearson International Airport.

Whitney is an avid golfer and participated in the inaugural Internet Invitational, a Youtube golf event organized by Barstool Sports.

== Career statistics ==
=== Regular season and playoffs ===
			Regular season					Playoffs
Season	Team	League	GP	G	A	Pts	PIM	GP	G	A	Pts	PIM
1999–00	Thayer Academy	HS–Prep	22	5	33	38	—	—	—	—	—	—
2000–01	U.S. NTDP U18	USDP	40	7	23	30	64	—	—	—	—	—
2000–01	U.S. NTDP Juniors	USHL	20	2	8	10	22	—	—	—	—	—
2001–02	Boston University	HE	35	4	17	21	46	—	—	—	—	—
2002–03	Boston University	HE	34	3	10	13	48	—	—	—	—	—
2003–04	Boston University	HE	38	9	16	25	56	—	—	—	—	—
2003–04	Wilkes–Barre/Scranton Penguins	AHL	—	—	—	—	—	20	1	9	10	0
2004–05	Wilkes–Barre/Scranton Penguins	AHL	80	6	35	41	101	11	2	7	9	12
2005–06	Wilkes–Barre/Scranton Penguins	AHL	9	5	9	14	6	11	1	4	5	8
2005–06	Pittsburgh Penguins	NHL	68	6	32	38	85	—	—	—	—	—
2006–07	Pittsburgh Penguins	NHL	81	14	45	59	77	5	1	1	2	6
2007–08	Pittsburgh Penguins	NHL	76	12	28	40	45	20	1	5	6	25
2008–09	Wilkes–Barre/Scranton Penguins	AHL	1	0	1	1	2	—	—	—	—	—
2008–09	Pittsburgh Penguins	NHL	28	2	11	13	16	—	—	—	—	—
2008–09	Anaheim Ducks	NHL	20	0	10	10	12	13	1	5	6	9
2009–10	Anaheim Ducks	NHL	62	4	24	28	48	—	—	—	—	—
2009–10	Edmonton Oilers	NHL	19	3	8	11	22	—	—	—	—	—
2010–11	Edmonton Oilers	NHL	35	2	25	27	33	—	—	—	—	—
2011–12	Edmonton Oilers	NHL	51	3	17	20	16	—	—	—	—	—
2012–13	Edmonton Oilers	NHL	34	4	9	13	23	—	—	—	—	—
2013–14	Florida Panthers	NHL	7	0	0	0	6	—	—	—	—	—
2013–14	San Antonio Rampage	AHL	45	7	16	23	52	—	—	—	—	—
2014–15	HC Sochi	KHL	42	6	13	19	23	4	0	1	1	0
2015–16	Modo Hockey	SHL	2	0	0	0	0	—	—	—	—	—
NHL totals			481	50	209	259	383	38	3	11	14	40

=== International ===
Year	Team	Event	Result	GP	G	A	Pts	PIM
2000	United States	U17	4th	6	1	0	1	2
2001	United States	WJC18	6th	6	0	1	1	8
2002	United States	WJC	5th	7	1	2	3	20
2003	United States	WJC	4th	7	1	4	5	14
2010	United States	OG	2nd place, silver medalist(s)	6	0	0	0	0
Junior totals				26	3	7	10	44
Senior totals				6	0	0	0	0

== Awards and honors ==
Award	Year
All-Hockey East Rookie Team	2001–02
2007 NHL YoungStars Team	2007

Sporting positions
Preceded by Colby Armstrong	Pittsburgh Penguins first-round draft pick 2002	Succeeded by Marc-André Fleury
