= Josh Richards (internet personality) =

Canadian social media personality

- Richards in 2025
- Born: Joshua Kenneth Richards; January 31, 2002 (age 24); Toronto, Ontario, Canada
- Occupations: Social media personality; businessman
- Years active: 2019–present
- Partner: Gabi Moura (2023–present)

Joshua Kenneth Richards (born January 31, 2002) is a Canadian social media personality and businessman. He is the CEO of CrossCheck Studios.

== Early life ==
Richards was born on January 31, 2002, in Toronto, Ontario. He spent his early years in Cobourg, a small Ontario town about an hour east of Toronto, before dropping out of high school and moving to Los Angeles. He has 2 younger siblings.

== Career ==
Richards has garnered a following of 25.7 million on TikTok, 2.14 million on YouTube, 2.4 million on Twitter, and 6.1 million on Instagram. His posts often include sports content, dancing, lip syncing, comedy, and video skits. He has acted in films including Brother's Keeper, Summertime Dropouts, and the upcoming Dream Scenario with Nicolas Cage and Noah Centineo.

Richards is the co-founder of digital management company TalentX Entertainment. Subsequently, Richards signed a recording contract with Warner Records and the first artist to sign with TalentX in July 2020.

He is an investor, helping form a $15 million venture capital fund. Richards is also the co-founder of energy drink Ani Energy, and previously was the chief strategy officer of Triller.

According to a Forbes report published in January 2022, Richards earned an estimated $5 million in 2021 from his numerous sponsorship deals and business endeavors, making him the fourth highest-earning TikTok personality.

More recently, he and his production company CrossCheck Studios, which he co-founded with fellow Sway House alum Griffin Johnson, struck a first-look deal with Amazon.

He is a co-host of the BFFs (podcast), a Barstool Sports podcast, with David Portnoy, and a former member of Sway House.

On May 7, 2025, the team of Josh Richards, Erik Anders Lang, and Brad Dalke won the third Creator Classic, which was held at the Philadelphia Cricket Club in Wissahickon, Philadelphia. In August 2025, he participated in the inaugural Internet Invitational hosted by Barstool Sports and Bob Does Sports and made it to the semifinals of the event.

== Personal life ==
He dated Nessa Barrett during 2019–2021. Their relationship ended when she started dating his best friend Jaden Hossler. Richards is currently in a relationship with Gabi Moura.

== Discography ==
- "Still Softish" feat. Bryce Hall (single, 2020)
- "Smallest Man" with Dave Portnoy (single, 2024)

== See also ==
- List of most-followed TikTok accounts
