= Paul Bissonnette =

Canadian ice hockey player and analyst

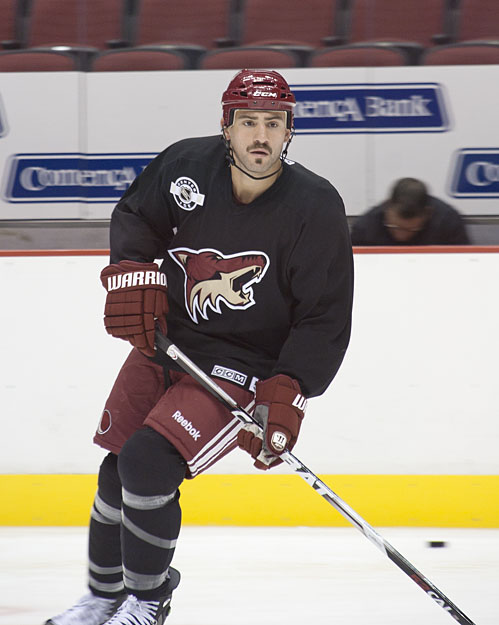
- Bissonnette with the Phoenix Coyotes in 2010
- Born: March 11, 1985 (age 41) Welland, Ontario, Canada
- Height: 6 ft 2 in (188 cm)
- Weight: 216 lb (98 kg; 15 st 6 lb)
- Position: Left wing
- Shot: Left
- Played for: Pittsburgh Penguins; Phoenix Coyotes; Cardiff Devils
- NHL draft: 121st overall, 2003; Pittsburgh Penguins
- Playing career: 2005–2017

Paul Albert Bissonnette (born March 11, 1985), nicknamed "Biz Nasty", is a Canadian professional ice hockey analyst and former player who played in the National Hockey League (NHL) for the Pittsburgh Penguins and Phoenix Coyotes.

Bissonnette is currently a studio analyst for NHL on TNT, an analyst for the former Arizona Coyotes TV/radio, and a co-host alongside former NHL defenceman Ryan Whitney on the Barstool Sports hockey podcast Spittin' Chiclets.

== Early life ==
Bissonnette was born March 11, 1985, in Welland, Ontario, to parents Yolande and Cam Bissonnette. He has an older sister; Natalie. His mother was an office administration professor at Niagara College for 30 years in Southern Ontario, while his father was a steel worker. Bissonnette is French Canadian and attended French-language schools until he was in grade seven. He is of biracial origin, as his mother is half black. Bissonnette is a fan of the Toronto Maple Leafs, both prior to his professional career and since retirement.

At age 16, Bissonnette was drafted 31st overall by the Ontario Hockey League (OHL)'s North Bay Centennials in the 2001 OHL Priority Selection. He played in 57 games as a rookie and scored three goals and three assists. Following the 2001–02 season, the Centennials relocated and became the Saginaw Spirit.

Bissonnette was named co-captain on the Spirit and also became a member of Canada's under-18 team that won gold medals at the 2003 Nations Cup. During the 2003 Home Hardware Top Prospects Game, Bissonnette was named Team Orr player of the game after recording a goal and fighting Dion Phaneuf.

== Playing career ==
=== Early career ===
Bissonnette was selected in the fourth round, 121st overall, of the 2003 NHL entry draft by the Pittsburgh Penguins. When drafted, he was playing as a defenceman with the Saginaw Spirit of the OHL. During the 2003–04 season, Bissonnette served as the Spirit captain and finished ninth in points. He played another half season with the Spirit before being traded to the Owen Sound Attack, where he finished the 2004–05 season.

=== Professional career ===
==== Pittsburgh Penguins ====
Bissonnette began his professional career during the 2005–06 season with the Wheeling Nailers of the ECHL. He appeared in 14 games for the Nailers, while also playing 55 games with the Wilkes-Barre/Scranton Penguins of the American Hockey League (AHL). On November 12, 2005, Bissonnette received his first professional fighting major when he fought Jordan Smith of the Portland Pirates. The following season, Bissonnette played 65 games with the Nailers, while only skating in three with the Wilkes-Barre/Scranton Penguins. Bissonnette scored his first professional goal in the AHL on February 25, 2006, on goaltender Maxime Ouellet of the Manitoba Moose. After 22 games with the Nailers during the 2007–08 season, Bissonnette was recalled by Wilkes-Barre/Scranton, where he would spend the remainder of the season. While in Wilkes-Barre/Scranton, teammates Dennis Bonvie and Deryk Engelland worked with Bissonnette, often practicing fighting techniques. During his time in Wheeling, he was also named to the ECHL all-star game twice.

Bissonnette earned a spot on Pittsburgh's roster to begin the 2008–09 season. He earned his first NHL fighting major on October 16, 2008, when he fought Matt Bradley of the Washington Capitals. During the fight, Bissonnette knocked Bradley to the ice, bloodying his nose. On January 13, 2009, Bissonnette recorded his first career NHL point, assisting on a goal by Tyler Kennedy against the Philadelphia Flyers. On May 5, during a playoff game between Wilkes-Barre/Scranton and the Hershey Bears, Bissonnette was hit awkwardly by Greg Amadio and Steve Pinizzotto. He was deeply cut by the skate of one of Hershey's players on his left wrist and suffered nerve damage in his left hand.

==== Phoenix Coyotes ====
On October 1, 2009, Bissonnette was claimed off waivers by the Phoenix Coyotes after failing to make the Penguins' NHL roster out of training camp. On October 12, Bissonnette's first fight as a Coyote occurred against Jody Shelley of the San Jose Sharks. On November 12, he scored his first of seven NHL goals, against goaltender Carey Price of the Montreal Canadiens in a 4–2 loss.

On October 5, 2011, Bissonnette signed a two-year contract extension with the Coyotes. During the 2011–12 season, on November 19, Bissonnette scored the game-winning goal, playing in front of his mother and grandparents for the first time as an NHL player. The Coyotes went on to win 4–2 over the Buffalo Sabres.

With the 2012–13 NHL lockout in effect, on November 1, 2012, Bissonnette signed with the Cardiff Devils of the British Elite Ice Hockey League (EIHL). In 10 games for Cardiff, Bissonnette recorded six goals and 15 assists for 21 points before returning to the Coyotes.

==== Various teams ====
Bissonnette left the Coyotes' organization after five seasons following the 2013–14 season. On September 16, 2014, he accepted a tryout agreement from the St. Louis Blues to attend their training camp. After playing the entirety of the pre-season, Bissonnette was released from his tryout on October 4. A few weeks later, on October 24, Bissonnette returned to the Cardiff Devils of the EIHL. He re-joined the team "on a temporary basis while he still looks for opportunities in the NHL". Bissonnette returned to the Coyotes' organization just three days later on October 27, when he signed a professional tryout agreement with the club's AHL affiliate, the Portland Pirates. After just eight games, Bissonnette was released from his tryout on December 9.

==== Manchester Monarchs/Ontario Reign ====
On the same day, Bissonnette signed a tryout agreement with the Manchester Monarchs, the AHL affiliate of the Los Angeles Kings. After 19 games, on February 3, 2015, the Monarchs signed Bissonnette to a standard AHL contract for the remainder of the season. Bissonnette and the Monarchs won the Calder Cup after defeating the Utica Comets in five games.

With the Monarchs moving to the ECHL, the team was replaced by the Ontario Reign as the Kings' AHL affiliate. On July 8, 2015, the Reign signed Bissonnette to a one-year contract. He played 35 games for the team during the 2015–16 season. On July 6, 2016, he returned to the Reign after signing a one-year extension.

== Post-playing career ==
On June 24, 2017, it was announced that Bissonnette would join the Coyotes' radio booth as a color commentator, replacing Nick Boynton. On September 7, Bissonnette officially confirmed his retirement from professional ice hockey.

On April 11, 2018, Bissonnette was announced as a new member of the Barstool Sports' podcast, Spittin' Chiclets, joining former Penguins' teammate Ryan Whitney. On May 14, Bissonnette released a mockumentary series named BizNasty Does BC, which he co-created with Pasha Eshghi. The series features 17 past and present NHL stars and shows off the beauty of the province of British Columbia.

In February 2019, Bissonnette partnered with CaniBrands, a CBD health and wellness company as the company's Sports and Media Ambassador.

In 2021, Turner Sports announced that Bissonnette would be joining the company as a pregame and intermission analyst for the NHL on TNT, alongside Wayne Gretzky, Anson Carter, and Rick Tocchet.

In November 2024, Bissonnette was assaulted by six men at a Houston's Restaurant in Scottsdale; the men were quickly arrested on charges of assault and disorderly conduct. Days later, Bissonnette recounted what occurred on the Spittin' Chiclets podcast, saying it began inside the restaurant, escalated to the parking lot and ended with him taking refuge in a CVS.

As part of Spittin Chiclets, Bissonnette participates in golf events known as Sandbagger Invitationals. The Spittin Chiclets members compete against former NHL players and other content creators in Youtube golf events. Bissonnette beat Sidney Crosby in one of the first events he did. In August 2025, Bissonnette participated in the inaugural Internet Invitational.

== Career statistics ==
=== Regular season and playoffs ===
			Regular season					Playoffs
Season	Team	League	GP	G	A	Pts	PIM	GP	G	A	Pts	PIM
2001–02	North Bay Centennials	OHL	57	3	3	6	21	5	0	0	0	2
2002–03	Saginaw Spirit	OHL	67	7	16	23	57	—	—	—	—	—
2003–04	Saginaw Spirit	OHL	67	5	14	19	96	—	—	—	—	—
2004–05	Saginaw Spirit	OHL	28	1	6	7	46	—	—	—	—	—
2004–05	Owen Sound Attack	OHL	35	2	11	13	46	8	1	3	4	2
2005–06	Wheeling Nailers	ECHL	14	3	7	10	4	—	—	—	—	—
2005–06	Wilkes–Barre/Scranton Penguins	AHL	55	1	5	6	60	11	0	1	1	4
2006–07	Wilkes–Barre/Scranton Penguins	AHL	3	0	0	0	0	—	—	—	—	—
2006–07	Wheeling Nailers	ECHL	65	10	32	42	115	—	—	—	—	—
2007–08	Wheeling Nailers	ECHL	22	3	14	17	43	—	—	—	—	—
2007–08	Wilkes–Barre/Scranton Penguins	AHL	46	3	5	8	145	7	0	0	0	11
2008–09	Pittsburgh Penguins	NHL	15	0	1	1	22	—	—	—	—	—
2008–09	Wilkes–Barre/Scranton Penguins	AHL	57	9	7	16	176	8	0	2	2	9
2009–10	Phoenix Coyotes	NHL	41	3	2	5	117	—	—	—	—	—
2010–11	Phoenix Coyotes	NHL	48	1	0	1	71	1	0	0	0	0
2011–12	Phoenix Coyotes	NHL	31	1	0	1	41	3	0	0	0	15
2012–13	Cardiff Devils	EIHL	11	6	15	21	8	—	—	—	—	—
2012–13	Phoenix Coyotes	NHL	28	0	6	6	36	—	—	—	—	—
2013–14	Phoenix Coyotes	NHL	39	2	6	8	53	—	—	—	—	—
2014–15	Portland Pirates	AHL	8	0	0	0	0	—	—	—	—	—
2014–15	Manchester Monarchs	AHL	48	1	6	7	167	11	0	0	0	5
2015–16	Ontario Reign	AHL	35	2	1	3	51	13	1	1	2	17
2016–17	Ontario Reign	AHL	18	0	3	3	48	—	—	—	—	—
AHL totals			270	16	27	43	653	50	1	4	5	46
NHL totals			202	7	15	22	340	4	0	0	0	15

=== International ===
Medal record

Representing Canada

Ice hockey

Nations Cup
Gold medal – first place	2002 Piešťany	

IIHF U18 Championships
Gold medal – first place	2003 Yaroslavl	

Year	Team	Event	Result	GP	G	A	Pts	PIM
2002	Canada	U18	1st place, gold medalist(s)	5	0	0	0	2
2003	Canada	WJC18	1st place, gold medalist(s)	7	0	1	1	0
Junior totals				12	0	1	1	2

== Awards and honours ==
Award	Year	Ref
ECHL
All-Star Game	2007	
AHL
Calder Cup champion	2015	
