= Bob Does Sports =

American YouTube channel

- Years active: 2021–present

YouTube information
- Channel: Bob Does Sports
- Genre: Sports
- Subscribers: 1.48 million
- Views: 419.5 million
- Last updated: July 17, 2026
- Website: breezygolf.com

Bob Does Sports is an American YouTube channel based around golf. It was founded in 2021 by Bobby Fairways (Robby Berger), with Joey Cold Cuts (Joseph Demare) and Fat Perez (Nick Stubbe) later becoming a part of the channel. They have collaborated with Barstool Sports to host the Internet Invitational tournament. In addition to content creation, Bob Does Sports also operates an apparel line, Breezy, and an alcoholic drink brand, Have A Day.

== History ==
The Bob Does Sports channel was created in September 2021 by Robby Berger, a part-time comedian who was also the creator of the TikTok account BrilliantlyDumb. The channel was originally meant to be a variety sports channel, with Berger going to major sporting events from various sports, such as the Ryder Cup or the World Series, but it switched to exclusively golf after he posted a video of him with Joseph Demare. Berger had previously become known for his playful heckling of golf pros at events. Berger first met Demare when they were both working at the Beverly Wilshire Hotel in Beverly Hills, California; Berger had acquired the job through his cousin, moving to California from Randolph, New Jersey, in 2018. He worked the overnight shift as a doorman, making videos during the day and editing and posting them to BrilliantlyDumb at night. He later was promoted to Guest Services Manager at the establishment. Demare, who was from Vancouver, was a hockey goalie in his childhood and worked in restaurants before getting a job at the Four Seasons in Whistler. He later moved to work at the Beverly Wilshire as the restaurant manager. Berger, a pitcher in college at Fairleigh Dickinson University, had only been into golf since his adult years, but Nick Stubbe, the best golfer of the group, had been involved in the sport since he was a child, playing two years of Division III at Hampden–Sydney College. During his job working full-time with public accounting and commercial real estate investment funds, Stubbe frequently took weekdays off to play golf. He had earned his accounting degree at the Virginia Commonwealth University, going there after transferring to the University of Richmond from Hampden–Sydney in 2009. Stubbe, who was from Richmond, Virginia, met Berger online during the pandemic, participating in the latter's Zoom happy hours. Berger once invited him to play golf with him and added him to the channel in July 2022 after seeing how good he was, with Stubbe quitting his job. Stubbe's nickname, "Fat Perez", came from a comparison to golfer Pat Perez.

In 2022, Bob Does Sports worked with media company Doing Things Media to launch the golf and apparel company Breezy Golf. They also organized a tournament series with the company, The Breezy Invitational. In August 2025, the channel partnered with Barstool Sports to host the inaugural Internet Invitational.

== Content and operations ==
The channel mainly produces videos of the group comically playing golf with a challenge attached, which can range from reaching a score or consuming an amount of food or drinks. In addition to Berger, Demare, and Stubbe, the channel's producers The Jet (Binyamin "Binny" Shicker) and J-Bone (Jensen Custis) commonly appear in videos. The group has brand partnerships with companies such as Callaway Golf Company, DraftKings, SeatGeek, Corona, and Celsius.
