= Ben Sinnott =

American football player (born 2002)

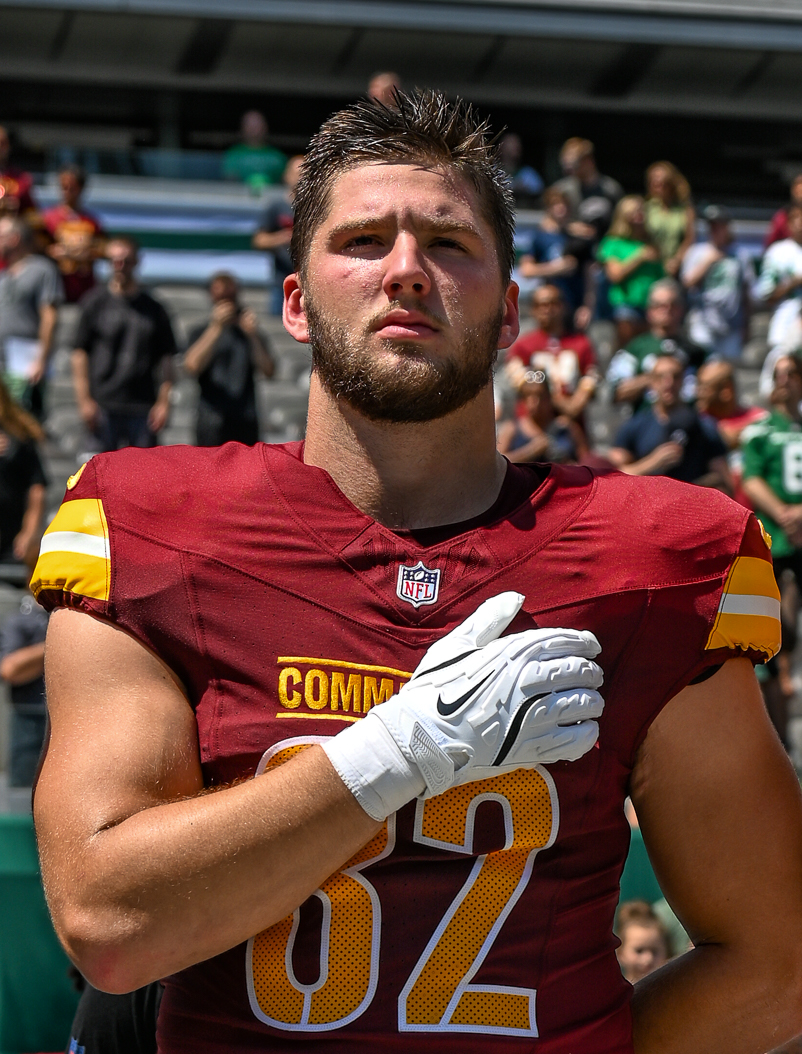
- Sinnott with the Washington Commanders in 2024

No. 82 – Washington Commanders
- Position: Tight end
- Roster status: Active

Personal information
- Born: June 14, 2002 (age 24); Waterloo, Iowa, U.S.
- Listed height: 6 ft 4 in (1.93 m)
- Listed weight: 245 lb (111 kg)

Career information
- High school: Columbus (Waterloo)
- College: Kansas State (2020–2023)
- NFL draft: 2024: 2nd round, 53rd overall pick

Career history
- Washington Commanders (2024–present)

Awards and highlights
- First-team All-Big 12 (2023)

Career NFL statistics as of Week 10, 2026
- Receptions: 21
- Receiving yards: 190
- Receiving touchdowns: 3
- Stats at Pro Football Reference

Benjamin Sinnott (/ˈsɪnət/ SIN-ət; born June 14, 2002) is an American professional football tight end for the Washington Commanders of the National Football League (NFL). He played college football for the Kansas State Wildcats, earning two All-Big 12 honors prior to being selected by the Commanders in the second round of the 2024 NFL draft.

== Early life ==
Sinnott was born on June 14, 2002, in Waterloo, Iowa, later attending Columbus High School. He committed to play college football for the South Dakota Coyotes before changing to the Kansas State Wildcats.

== College career ==
Sinnott redshirted his true freshman season at Kansas State. He caught two passes for 15 yards and rushed three times for 12 yards and one touchdown during his redshirt freshman season. Sinnott was named first-team All-Big 12 Conference as a redshirt sophomore after catching 31 passes for 447 yards and four touchdowns.

Sinnott was the 2023 Lowman Trophy award winner, which is an award for the best college fullback in the country as presented by the Barstool Sports podcast, Pardon My Take (hosted by Dan Katz and PFT Commenter).

== Professional career ==
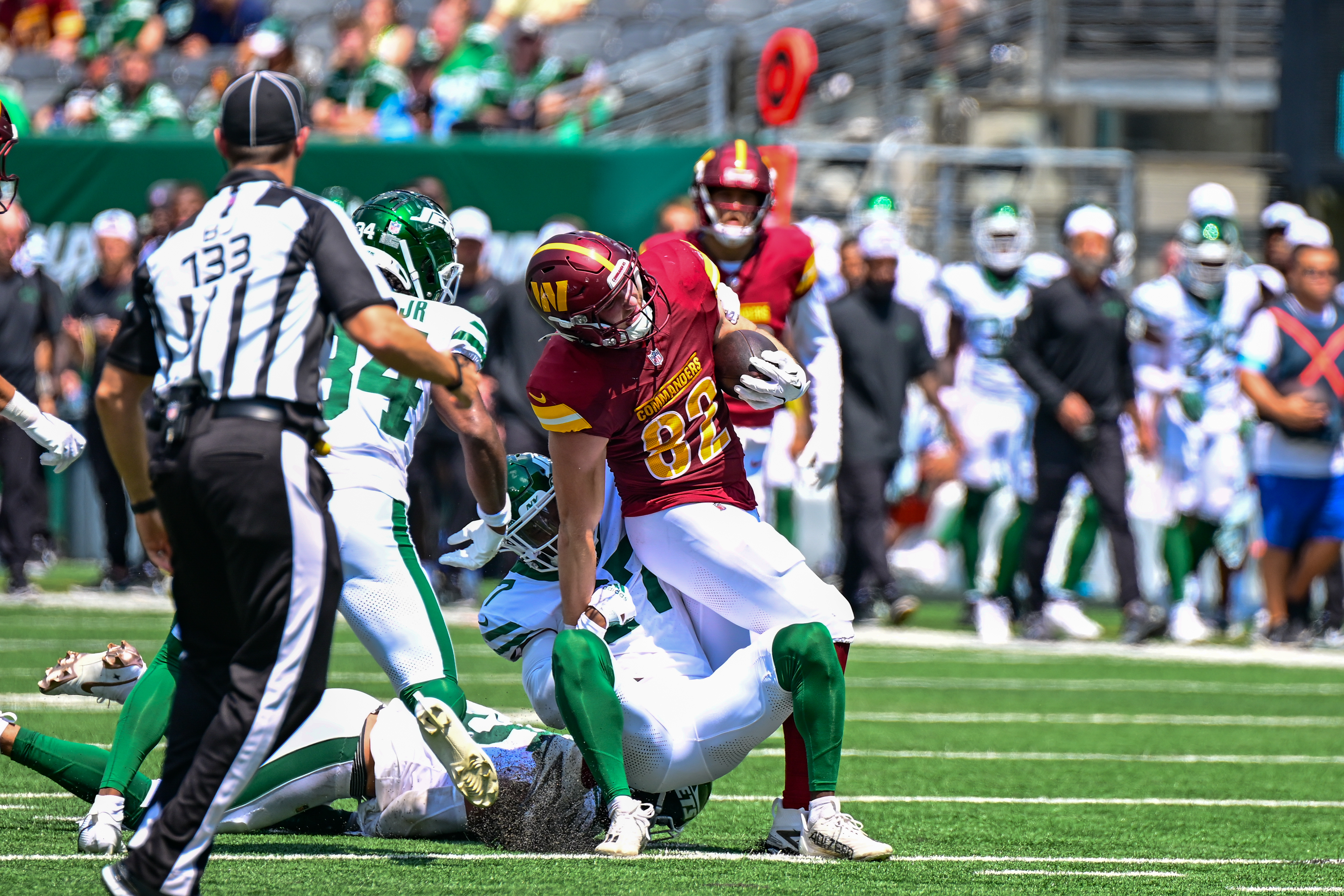
Sinnott running after a catch against the New York Jets, 2024

Pre-draft measurables
Height	Weight	Arm length	Hand span	Wingspan	40-yard dash	10-yard split	20-yard split	20-yard shuttle	Three-cone drill	Vertical jump	Broad jump
6 ft 3 7/8 in (1.93 m)	250 lb (113 kg)	32 3/8 in (0.82 m)	9 1/2 in (0.24 m)	6 ft 5 1/2 in (1.97 m)	4.68 s	1.59 s	2.71 s	4.23 s	6.82 s	40.0 in (1.02 m)	10 ft 6 in (3.20 m)
All values from NFL Combine

Sinnott was selected by the Washington Commanders in the second round (53rd overall) of the 2024 NFL draft. He signed his four-year rookie contract on June 14, 2024. Sinnott recorded his first career catch, a three-yard touchdown, in Week 6 against the Carolina Panthers. In his rookie season, he had limited production and playing time in the Commanders' offense, recording five receptions out of five targets for 28 receiving yards and one touchdown over 17 regular season games. He also caught a 23-yard pass from Tress Way on a fake punt during the NFC Championship Game.

== NFL career statistics ==
=== Regular season ===
Year	Team	Games		Receiving					Fumbles	
Year	Team	GP	GS	Rec	Yds	Avg	Lng	TD	Fum	Lost
2024	WAS	17	2	5	28	5.6	12	1	–	–
2025	WAS	16	3	11	114	10.4	36	1	--	--
2026	WAS	8	4	5	48	9.6	24	1	-	-
Career		41	9	21	190	9.0	36	3	–	–

=== Postseason ===
Year	Team	Games		Receiving					Fumbles	
Year	Team	GP	GS	Rec	Yds	Avg	Lng	TD	Fum	Lost
2024	WAS	2	0	1	23	23.0	0	0	–	–
Career		2	0	1	23	23.0	0	0	–	–
