= Max Bredeson =

American football player (born 2002)

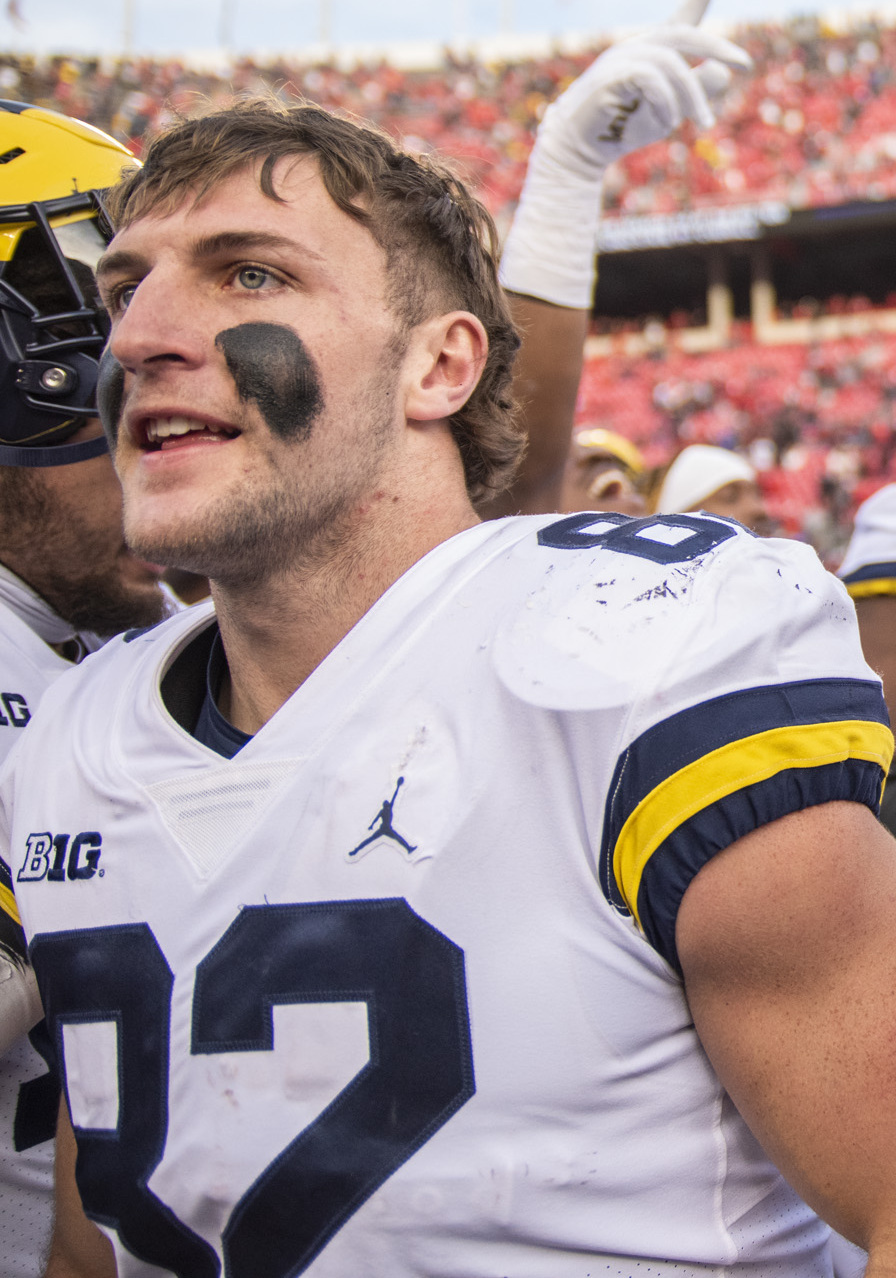
- Bredeson with the Michigan Wolverines in 2022

No. 45 – Minnesota Vikings
- Position: Fullback
- Roster status: Active

Personal information
- Born: October 4, 2002 (age 24); Hartland, Wisconsin, U.S.
- Listed height: 6 ft 2 in (1.88 m)
- Listed weight: 252 lb (114 kg)

Career information
- High school: Arrowhead (Hartland)
- College: Michigan (2021–2025)
- NFL draft: 2026: 5th round, 159th overall pick

Career history
- Minnesota Vikings (2026–present)

Awards and highlights
- CFP national champion (2023); Third-team All-Big Ten (2025)
- Stats at Pro Football Reference

Max Michael Bredeson (born October 4, 2002) is an American professional football fullback for the Minnesota Vikings of the National Football League (NFL). He played college football for the Michigan Wolverines, winning three consecutive Big Ten Conference titles and a national championship in 2023. Bredeson was selected by the Vikings in the fifth round of the 2026 NFL draft.

== Early life ==
Bredeson was born on October 4, 2002, in Hartland, Wisconsin, the son of Mike and Debra Bredeson. He is the younger brother of former Michigan and current Tampa Bay Buccaneers guard, Ben Bredeson and former Michigan baseball pitcher, Jack Bredeson. He attended Arrowhead High School and played quarterback. As a senior, he was named the Classic 8 Conference Offensive Player of the Year and was an All-State honorable mention. He completed 56-of-109 passes for 822 yards and five touchdowns, while rushing for 711 yards and nine touchdowns in six games.

== College career ==
In 2021 Bredeson was a preferred walk-on for the University of Michigan. He appeared in one game as a freshman. As a sophomore in 2022, Bredeson appeared in all 14 games for the Wolverines, and earned his first career start. On the season he had 5 receptions for 78 yards, including his first career reception against Colorado State on September 3.

In 2023, Bredeson was a key contributor in the run game, blocking as an H-back for Michigan’s national championship team. He appeared in all 15 games, starting 3 games as a junior. He had 2 catches for 19 yards on the season. One of his most memorable moments of the season came in the Rose Bowl, where he set the tone of the game early with a dominating block against Alabama’s Caleb Downs.

In 2024, Bredeson was voted as a team captain for his senior season at Michigan. He finished the year with three receptions for 24 yards and was the leader in run blocking. Bredeson announced he would be returning for a fifth and final season in 2025, where he was again named a captain and earned All-Big Ten honors.

Bredeson is the 2025 Lowman award winner for the top fullback in the nation, which is an award by the Barstool Sports Pardon My Take podcast (hosted by Dan Katz and PFT Commenter).

== Professional career ==
Pre-draft measurables
Height	Weight	Arm length	Hand span	Wingspan
6 ft 2 in (1.88 m)	252 lb (114 kg)	30 1/8 in (0.77 m)	10 in (0.25 m)	6 ft 2 7/8 in (1.90 m)
All values from NFL Combine

Bredeson was selected by the Minnesota Vikings in the fifth round with the 159th overall pick of the 2026 NFL draft.
