= Jerry O'Connell =

American actor and TV show host (born 1974)

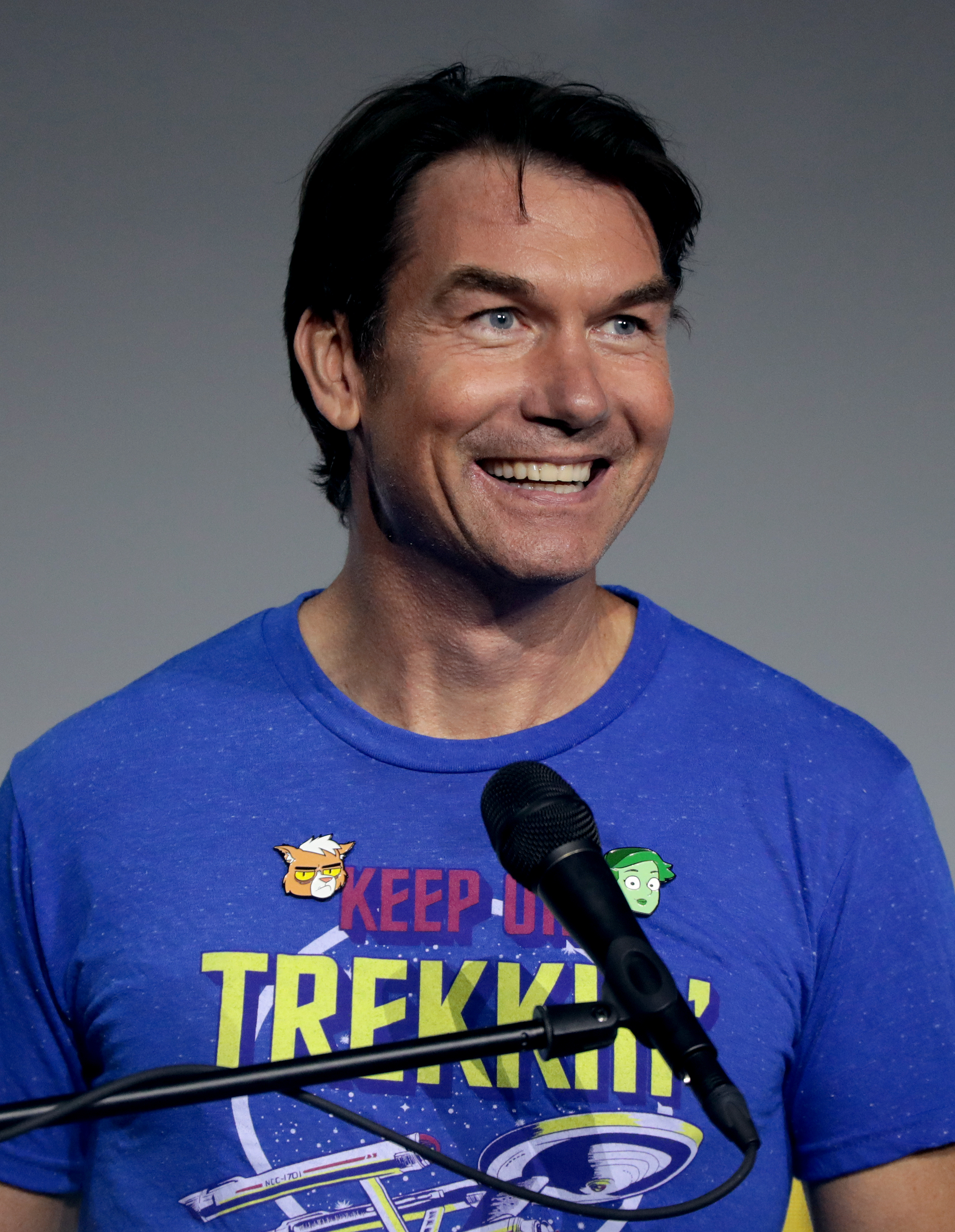
- O'Connell in 2019
- Born: Michael Jeremiah Witkowski O'Connell; February 17, 1974 (age 52); New York City, U.S.
- Citizenship: United States; United Kingdom
- Education: New York University (BFA)
- Occupations: Actor; TV show host
- Years active: 1983–present
- Height: 6 ft 2.25 in (189 cm)
- Spouse: Rebecca Romijn (m. 2007)
- Children: 2
- Relatives: Charlie O'Connell (brother); Charles Witkowski (grandfather)

Michael Jeremiah Witkowski "Jerry" O'Connell (born February 17, 1974) is an American actor and TV show host. He is known for his roles as Quinn Mallory in the television series Sliders, Andrew Clements in My Secret Identity, Vern Tessio in the film Stand by Me (1986), Joe in Joe's Apartment (1996), Frank Cushman in Jerry Maguire (1996), Derek in Scream 2 (1997), Michael in Tomcats (2001), Charlie Carbone in Kangaroo Jack (2003), and Detective Woody Hoyt on the NBC drama Crossing Jordan. He starred as Pete Kaczmarek in The Defenders (2010–2011), which lasted one season. He also had a starring role in the comedy horror film Piranha 3D (2010). O'Connell voiced Commander Jack Ransom on the animated series Star Trek: Lower Decks and hosted a version of Pictionary syndicated on Fox stations.

== Early life ==
O'Connell was born in New York City, the eldest son of Linda Witkowski, a Special Education teacher in New Jersey, and Michael O'Connell, an advertising agency art director originally from the United Kingdom. He is of half Irish, one quarter Italian, and one quarter Polish ancestry. O'Connell's paternal grandfather was from County Cork, Ireland while his maternal grandmother was from Belfast, Northern Ireland. His maternal grandfather was Charles S. Witkowski, the 34th mayor of Jersey City, New Jersey. O'Connell was raised in Manhattan with his younger brother, actor Charlie O'Connell. As a teenager, he attended Manhattan's Professional Children's School. He attended New York University from 1991 to 1994, majoring in film. While there, he studied screen writing and competed on the fencing team, serving a stint as captain of the sabre squad. He graduated in 1995.

== Career ==
O'Connell began his acting career at a young age. As a child, he did commercial work for Duncan Hines cookies. Shortly after turning eleven, he landed his first feature film role as the character Vern Tessio in Rob Reiner's Stand by Me. In 1987, O'Connell appeared in a commercial for Kellogg's Frosted Flakes. He starred in the Canadian science-fiction sitcom My Secret Identity from 1988 to 1991 as the teen hero who develops superhuman traits. During a summer break from NYU, Jerry starred in the feature film Calendar Girl alongside Jason Priestley and Gabriel Olds. He also appeared in the short-lived ABC sitcom Camp Wilder, with Jay Mohr and Hilary Swank, in 1992. During his junior year, O'Connell auditioned for the television pilot Sliders (also filmed in Canada). He was offered the role of Quinn Mallory in the series, which ran for three seasons on Fox and two seasons on the Syfy Channel. He served as producer during his fourth season, and is credited with writing and directing several episodes.

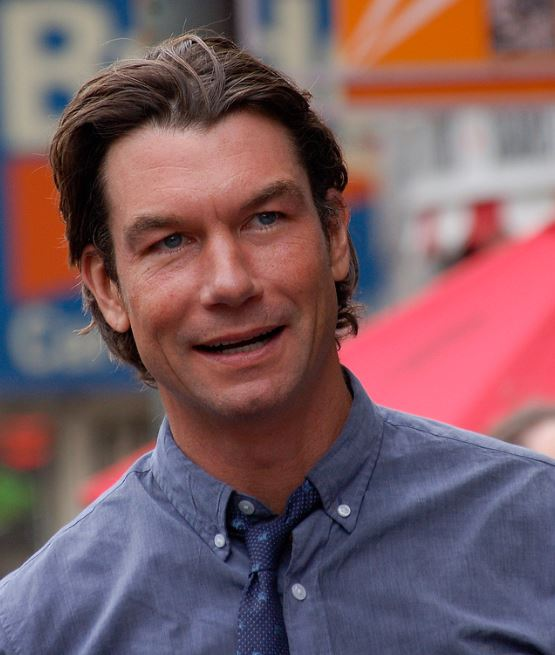
O'Connell in June 2013

O'Connell has since gone on to star in such films as Jerry Maguire, Body Shots, Mission to Mars, Tomcats, Scream 2, and Kangaroo Jack. O'Connell also guest-hosted the late night talk show Later during the late 1990s. O'Connell has also tried his hand at screenwriting and sold his first screenplay, for First Daughter, to New Regency in 1999. The film was released in 2004 by 20th Century Fox-based Davis Entertainment. O'Connell served as executive producer and received a "story by" credit on the film, which starred Katie Holmes and Michael Keaton.

O'Connell starred as Detective Woody Hoyt on the NBC crime drama Crossing Jordan (2001) until its cancellation in May 2007. He starred opposite his then-fiancée Rebecca Romijn in the Ugly Betty episode "Derailed". He played Hoyt in several episodes of Las Vegas. In 2004, he wore a diaper on Last Call with Carson Daly, during a mock commercial skit for the GoodNites bedwetting product. The National Enquirer caught him filming the skit and printed a photo of him in his diaper.

In 2005, O'Connell guest-starred in the Justice League Unlimited episode "Clash", voicing Captain Marvel. He reprised the role in the DC Universe Animated Original Movies short film Superman/Shazam!: The Return of Black Adam alongside George Newbern, who reprised the role of Superman, having done the voice for the animated series. Jerry's younger brother Charlie has appeared in several productions in which his brother starred, such as in Sliders and Crossing Jordan. In 2007–2008 O'Connell starred in ABC's Carpoolers, which ran from October 2, 2007, to March 4, 2008. In early 2008, O'Connell participated in a widely circulated Internet video parody of the leaked Tom Cruise video on Scientology. Cruise was O'Connell's co-star in Jerry Maguire.

O'Connell co-wrote and appeared in a video parody called "Young Hillary Clinton", satirizing Hillary Clinton's 2008 primary campaign. On February 2, 2008, O'Connell hosted VH1's Pepsi Smash Super Bowl Bash, which aired the night before Super Bowl XLII and featured musical guests Maroon 5 and Mary J. Blige. On April 28, 2008, he appeared as a guest star on ABC's Samantha Who?. In late 2008 O'Connell starred in Fox's Do Not Disturb, co-starring Niecy Nash, but Fox cancelled the show after only three episodes.

O'Connell appeared in the 2009 thriller film Obsessed as "Ben", the best friend and co-worker of the film's protagonist Derek Charles (Idris Elba). He appeared in Eastwick on ABC, which starred his wife, Romijn. He portrayed Derrick Jones in Alexandre Aja's Piranha 3D, which also stars Adam Scott and Elisabeth Shue.

O'Connell co-starred with David Tennant in the pilot for legal drama Rex Is Not Your Lawyer, which was not picked up for production. In 2010, O'Connell starred with Jim Belushi in the CBS comedy drama The Defenders, which was cancelled on May 15, 2011, after one season.

O'Connell appeared on Broadway at the Golden Theatre in Seminar, written by Theresa Rebeck. The play, directed by Sam Gold, opened on November 20, 2011, starring Alan Rickman, Lily Rabe, Hamish Linklater and Hettienne Park. On June 4, 2012, it was announced that O'Connell would play Herman Munster in a reboot of The Munsters, titled Mockingbird Lane; the remake series was never picked up for production; however, the pilot would air as a Halloween special on October 26. On May 15, 2013, it was announced that O'Connell would play Stuart Strickland on We Are Men, alongside Tony Shalhoub.

In April 2015, O'Connell returned to Broadway in the comedy Living on Love, with Renee Fleming, Anna Chlumsky and Douglas Sills. It closed after 37 performances.

In 2017, O'Connell was the main love interest in the Hallmark film Love Locks, co-starring his real-life wife Rebecca Romijn.

He also starred in a Canadian police comedy-drama series called Carter, which was shot in North Bay, Ontario and aired for two seasons.

In January 2020, O'Connell appeared in the Roundabout's American Airlines Theatre's Broadway revival of A Soldier's Play as Captain Taylor in an ensemble cast headed by David Alan Grier and Blair Underwood.

In 2020, he began starring in commercials for Bob Evans grocery items alongside Alfonso Ribeiro.

In July 2021, CBS announced that O'Connell would be joining The Talk as a permanent co-host, replacing Sharon Osbourne. That same month, he hosted a test-run of a new syndicated version of Pictionary on Fox stations, which was successful enough to launch with a full season in fall 2022. He and wife Romijn hosted The Real Love Boat on CBS, in 2022.

== Personal life ==
On July 14, 2007, O'Connell married actress and supermodel Rebecca Romijn. Their twin girls were born in 2008.

O'Connell enrolled in Southwestern Law School in Los Angeles in August 2009, but dropped out to return to acting full-time.

O'Connell has dual American and British citizenship.

O'Connell is a regular guest on the Barstool Sports podcast Pardon My Take, where he discusses his passion for fantasy football and his fandom for the show. He maintains the official position of Fantasy Football Expert for the show and runs the fantasy football team for hosts Dan "Big Cat" Katz and PFT Commenter. As of January 2025, O'Connell's role as general manager of PMT's fantasy team was in jeopardy due to results of the 2024 season. However, he has retained this title for the 2025 season and produces a Fantasy Minute segment for the show on Fridays.

O'Connell was once roommates with actor and comedian T.J. Miller.

O'Connell is an active practitioner of Brazilian jiu-jitsu, and he trains under Jean Jacques Machado.

== Filmography ==
=== Film ===
List of film credits
Year	Title	Role	Notes
1986	Stand by Me	Vernon "Vern" Tessio	
1988	Police Academy 5: Assignment Miami Beach	Kid at Beach	Uncredited
1993	Calendar Girl	Scott Foreman	
1995	Blue River	Lawrence Sellars	
1996	Joe's Apartment	Joe	
1996	Jerry Maguire	Frank "Cush" Cushman	
1997	Scream 2	Derek Feldman	
1998	Can't Hardly Wait	Trip McNeely	Uncredited
1999	The Beast of Today	Fabian	
1999	Body Shots	Michael Penorisi	
2000	Mission to Mars	Phil Ohlmyer	
2001	Tomcats	Michael Delaney	
2002	The New Guy	Highland Party Twin	
2002	Buying the Cow	David Collins	
2003	Kangaroo Jack	Charlie Carbone	
2004	Fat Slags	Sean Cooley	
2004	First Daughter	N/A	Producer, screenwriter
2005	Yours, Mine & Ours	Max Algrant	
2006	The Alibi	Businessman	
2006	Man About Town	David Lilly	
2006	Room 6	Lucas Dylan	
2008	The Parody Video Tom Cruise Wants You to See	Tom Cruise	Short film
2009	Baby on Board	Curtis	
2009	Obsessed	Ben	
2010	Piranha 3D	Derrick Jones	
2010	Superman/Shazam!: The Return of Black Adam	Captain Marvel	Voice, short film
2011	Still Screaming: The Ultimate Scary Movie Retrospective	Himself	Documentary film
2013	Scary Movie 5	Christian Grey	
2014	Veronica Mars	Sheriff Dan Lamb	
2014	Space Station 76	Steve	
2014	The Lookalike	Joe Mulligan	
2015	Justice League: Throne of Atlantis	Clark Kent / Superman	Voice
2016	Justice League vs. Teen Titans	Clark Kent / Superman	Voice
2016	Trolland	Hayden	Voice
2017	Justice League Dark	Clark Kent / Superman	Voice
2017	The Lego Batman Movie	Martian Manhunter	Voice, uncredited
2017	A Mermaid's Tale	Matt	
2017	Wish Upon	Alex	Uncredited
2018	The Death of Superman	Clark Kent / Superman	Voice
2018	Deep Murder	Doug Dangler	
2019	Reign of the Supermen	Clark Kent / Superman, Cyborg Superman	Voice
2019	Satanic Panic	Samuel Ross	
2019	Batman: Hush	Clark Kent / Superman	Voice
2020	Justice League Dark: Apokolips War	Clark Kent / Superman	Voice
2020	The F**k It List	Jeffrey	
2020	The Secret: Dare to Dream	Tucker	
2020	Ballbuster	Rich	
2021	Endangered Species	Mitch Hanover	
2021	Pups Alone	Charlie	Voice
2022	Play Dead	Coroner	
2023	The Donor Party	Tim	
2026	Stop! That! Train!	Bickering Husband	

=== Television ===
List of television credits
Year	Title	Role	Notes
1987	The Room Upstairs	Carl	Television film
1988	The Equalizer	Bobby	Episode: "The Child Broker"
1988	Ollie Hopnoodle's Haven of Bliss	Ralph Parker	Television film
1988‍–‍1991	My Secret Identity	Andrew Clements	Main role
1989	Charles in Charge	David Landon	Episode: "The Organization Man"
1992‍–‍1993	Camp Wilder	Brody Wilder	Main role
1995	The Ranger, the Cook and a Hole in the Sky	Mac	Television film
1995	Blue River	Lawrence Sellars	Television film
1995‍–‍1999	Sliders	Quinn Mallory	Main role; also producer, director & writer
1997	Later	Himself (guest host)	
1997	What the Deaf Man Heard	Reverend Perry Ray Pruitt	Television film
1999	The '60s	Brian Herlihy	Television film
2001	Night Visions	Andy	Episode: "Rest Stop"
2002	Going to California	Pete Rossock	Episode: "Searching for Eddie Van Halen"
2002	Rome Fire	Ryan Wheeler	Television film
2002‍–‍2007	Crossing Jordan	Detective Woody Hoyt	Main role
2003–2008	MADtv	Ted Levin, John Edwards	2 episodes
2004	Without a Trace	Joe Gibson	Episode: "Hawks and Handsaws"
2004	The Screaming Cocktail Hour	Singer	
2004	Las Vegas	Detective Woody Hoyt	5 episodes
2005	Justice League Unlimited	Captain Marvel	Voice, episode: "Clash"
2007	On the Lot	Jerry 'The Move'	Episode: "6 Cut to 5 & 5 Directors Compete"
2007	Ugly Betty	Joel	Episode: "Derailed"
2007	The Batman	Nightwing	Voice, 2 episodes
2007‍–‍2008	Carpoolers	Laird	Main role
2008	Samantha Who?	Craig	Episode: "The Gallery Show"
2008	Do Not Disturb	Neal	Main role
2009	Midnight Bayou	Declan Fitzpatrick	Television film
2009	Eastwick	Colin Friesen	Episode: "Magic Snow and Creepy Gene"
2010‍–‍2011	The Defenders	Pete Kaczmarek	Main role
2011	G.I. Joe: Renegades	Barbecue	Episode: "Fire Fight"
2011	Fish Hooks	Sterling Hamsterton	Voice, episode: "Pamela Hamster Returns"
2011	NTSF:SD:SUV::	Mental Man	Episode: "Up Periscope, Down With San Diego"
2012	Mockingbird Lane	Herman Munster	TV special
2013‍–‍2015	Jake and the Never Land Pirates	Pip	Voice, 7 episodes
2013	Burning Love	Henry	Season 2 cast member
2013	King & Maxwell	Jerry Walkeiwicz	Episode: "Stealing Secrets"
2013	Satisfaction	David	Episode: "Penis Face Cat Funeral"
2013	We Are Men	Stuart Strickland	Main role
2014‍–‍2019	Drunk History	Thomas Jefferson, Grigori Rasputin, Ken McElroy	4 episodes
2014	The League	Father Muldoon	Episode: "The Heavenly Fouler"
2015	The Librarians	Young Lancelot	Episode: "And the Loom of Fate"
2015	Workaholics	Teddy	Episode: "Gayborhood"
2015	Marry Me	Daniel	Episode: "Friend Me"
2015	Significant Mother	Bob Babcock	Episode: "Home Is Where the Lamp Is"
2015	Fresh Beat Band of Spies	Arizona Jones	Voice, episode: "Mummy Mayhem"
2016	The Mysteries of Laura	Jon Dunham	2 episodes
2016	Young & Hungry	Nick Diamond	Episode: "Young & Parents"
2016	Gay for Play Game Show Starring RuPaul	Himself	Episode: "Featuring Rebecca Romijn"
2016	Mistresses	Robert	4 episodes
2016	Scream Queens	Dr. Mike	2 episodes
2016–2022	Billions	Steven Birch	10 episodes
2017	Love Locks	Jack Burrow	Television film
2017	Justice League Action	Ray Palmer / Atom	Voice, 5 episodes
2017	Andi Mack	Director	Episode: "Dad Influence"
2017	Infomercials	Ted Apples	Episode: "Cool Dad"
2017	Curb Your Enthusiasm	TV Detective #2	Episode: "The Shucker"
2018‍–‍2018	Bravo's Play by Play	Himself (main host)	3 episodes
2018‍–‍2019	The Big Bang Theory	George Cooper Jr.	3 episodes
2018‍–‍2019	The Wendy Williams Show	Himself (guest host)	7 episodes
2018‍–‍2019	Carter	Harley Carter	Main role
2019	Jerry O'	Himself (host)	15 episodes
2019	Where's Waldo?	Jerry	Voice, episode: "Hit or Miss In Greece"
2020	Flipped	Chazz Connelly	3 episodes
2020‍–‍2023	The Ready Room	Himself	3 episodes
2020–2024	Star Trek: Lower Decks	Commander Jack Ransom	Voice, main role
2021‍–‍2024	The Talk	Himself (co-host)	
2022	The Lake	Gil the Thrill	2 episodes
2022	Tab Time	Coach Goodgame	Episode: "Winning & Losing"
2022	The Real Love Boat	Himself (host)	Main role
2022‍–‍2025	Pictionary	Himself (host)	Main role
2023	The Neighborhood	Himself	Episode: "Welcome to the Milestone"
2023	Star Trek: Strange New Worlds	Commander Jack Ransom	Voice, episode: "Those Old Scientists"
2023	The Real Housewives of Beverly Hills	Himself	Episode: "Sutton-ly Suspicious"
2023‍–‍2025	Solar Opposites	Jerry O'Connell / Barry Hatfield	Voice, 2 episodes
2024	Big Brother	Himself (host)	Fill-in for Julie Chen Moonves on Season 26 (1 episode)
2025	Krapopolis	Musculus	Voice, episode: “Love Trap, Baby!”
2025‍–‍present	Big Brother: Unlocked	Guest/Host	Companion show with Big Brother Guest, season 1; Host, season 2
2026	Summer's Last Resort	Glenn	Television film
2026	Neagley	Himself	Episode: "Trip"

=== Video games ===
List of video game credits
Year	Title	Role	Notes
2015	Infinite Crisis	Shazam	

=== Music videos ===
- "David Duchovny" – Bree Sharp (1999)
- "Heartbreaker" – Mariah Carey featuring Jay-Z (1999)
- "12 Days of Christmas" – Katya Zamolodchikova

=== Podcast appearances ===
- Pardon My Take – August 6, 2018; August 23, 2019; July 24, 2020; September 1, 2021; February 9, 2022; September 2, 2022; December 2, 2022; March 10, 2023; September 1, 2023; February 7, 2024; May 6, 2024; May 20, 2024; August 28, 2024; January 29, 2025; March 7, 2025; April 2, 2025 (as Big Dom); June 2, 2025; July 18, 2025; August 22, 2025; Fantasy minute after Memes starts the music. September 21, 2026 (as Mr. Bing Bong).
- Comments by Celebs – September 24, 2018
- The Dan LeBatard Show with Stugotz feat. Baron Davis – August 5, 2020
- The Kinda Funny Podcast – April 8, 2021
- I've Had It - February 6, 2024

== Awards and nominations ==
List of awards and nominations received by Jerry O'Connell
Year	Award	Category	Nominated work	Result
1987	Young Artist Awards	Jackie Coogan Award (shared with River Phoenix, Wil Wheaton, Corey Feldman)	Stand by Me	Won
1989	Young Artist Awards	Best Young Actor in a Family Syndicated Show	My Secret Identity	Nominated
1990	Young Artist Awards	Best Young Actor in an Off-Primetime Family	My Secret Identity	Nominated
2019	Canadian Screen Awards	Best Lead Actor – Drama Series	Carter	Nominated
2020	Canadian Screen Awards	Best Lead Actor – Drama Series	Carter	Nominated
2023	Daytime Emmy Awards	Outstanding Daytime Talk Series Host (shared with the other hosts)	The Talk	Nominated
2024	Daytime Emmy Awards	Outstanding Daytime Talk Series Host (shared with the other hosts)	The Talk	Nominated

Media offices
Preceded by Sharon Osbourne	The Talk co-host 2021-2024	Incumbent
