= Stu Feiner =

American sports gambling commentator

- Born: Stuart Feiner; January 31, 1961 (age 65); Brooklyn, New York, U.S.
- Education: Nassau Community College
- Occupations: Sports media content creator & gambling handicapper
- Employer: Barstool Sports
- Height: 5 ft 4 in (163 cm)
- Spouse: Sandra Feiner
- Children: 4
- Website: https://www.stufeiner.com

Stuart Feiner (born January 31, 1961) is an American sports handicapper and media personality. Feiner works for Barstool Sports. Feiner also is known to be the real life inspiration of Al Pacino's character in the 2005 film Two for the Money. Feiner is a host on Barstool Sports Advisors with Dave Portnoy, Dan "Big Cat" Katz, and Gerard "Jersey Jerry" Gilfone. He is a frequent guest on WFAN and makes appearances on other Barstool Sports podcasts and videos.

== Early life ==
Stu and his brother Lester were born in Brooklyn, New York to Claire and Howard Feiner. He moved to Farmingdale, New York on Long Island, at a young age, where Feiner and his family reside. Feiner graduated from Farmingdale High School in 1979 and attended Nassau Community College. At a young age, he was drawn to sports betting, and became a handicapper nicknamed "The Source".

== Career ==
Feiner has been handicapping sports since 1981 and claims his success dwindled due to the rise of the internet, stating that he had a $16 million sports handicapping business in 1997. Although he is an avid and admitted sports gambler, he is a critic of gambling, stating "Gambling is for the rich to lose money". Feiner rose back to prominence in 2017 when he first appeared on the Barstool Sports podcast, Pardon My Take, where he would become a reoccurring guest due to his vibrant and boistrous personality. Feiner currently appears on several Barstool Sports programs and is a host of Barstool Sports Advisors with Dave Portnoy, Dan "Big Cat" Katz and Gerard "Jersey Jerry" Gilfone.

== Personal life ==
Feiner married Sandra Feiner in 1988, ten years after they first met. He has four sons. Sean, Alex, Ryan and John Allan. Feiner currently resides in Farmingdale, New York. Feiner is Jewish.
