= Wake Up Barstool =

US television sports talk show

- Genre: Sports talk
- Created by: Barstool Sports
- Presented by: Dave Portnoy; T-Bob Hebert
- Starring: Mark Titus; PFT Commenter
- Country of origin: United States
- Original language: English

Production
- Production location: Chicago
- Camera setup: Multi-camera
- Running time: 120 minutes

Original release
- Network: FS1
- Release: September 2, 2025 – present

Wake Up Barstool is a sports talk television show airing on Fox Sports 1 hosted by various personalities from Barstool Sports. The show debuted on September 2, 2025.

== History ==
Barstool Sports is a sports media company founded as a sports betting newspaper in Boston by Dave Portnoy in 2003. Since its founding, the company has grown into a full-fledged online media outlet, hosting a blog and podcasts covering sports and pop culture. Barstool Sports was owned by Penn Entertainment between 2020 and 2023. Portnoy repurchased sole ownership of the company in August 2023.

In July 2025, Barstool and Fox Sports announced a wide-ranging partnership, including appearances by Barstool personalities on Big Noon Kickoff and a morning show on FS1. Wake Up Barstool was announced in late August, one week before its debut.

== Content ==
Each day of the week, Wake Up Barstool is hosted by different Barstool Sports personalities, including Portnoy, Dan "Big Cat" Katz, PFT Commenter, Mark Titus, and T-Bob Hebert. The show occupies a 2-hour timeslot.

| Weekday | Hosts | Stats Desk | Former Hosts |
|---|---|---|---|
| Monday | Dave Portnoy, Brandon Walker, and T-Bob Hebert (Jon Gruden and Greg Olsen have segments during football season) | Liam Blutman, Meek Phil | Rico Bosco and Jason "White Chocolate" Williams |
| Tuesday | Dan "Big Cat" Katz, Nick Turani, Eddie Farrer, and T-Bob Hebert | Steven Cheah | |
| Wednesday | Brandon Walker, Connor Griffin, Evan Bosanko (EBo), and T-Bob Hebert (Hannah Montoya has a weekly fashion report segment and Stu Feiner makes occasional hosting appearances) | Kyle Bauer (KBNoSwag) | |
| Thursday | PFT Commenter, Mark Titus, Jersey Jerry, and T-Bob Hebert (Kate Mannion has a weekly roast segment) | Big T (Connor Knapp) | |
| Friday | Mike Katic, Dana Beers, and T-Bob Hebert | Megan Makin Money (Megan Nunez) | |
