= San Banarje =

American film director, actor, and producer

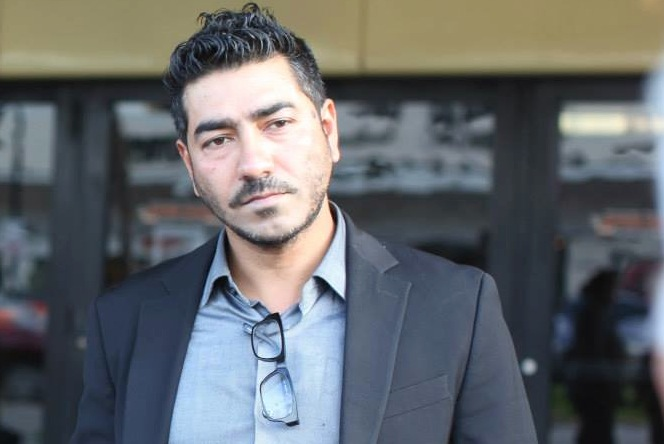
- Occupations: Filmmaker, Cinematographer, Screenwriter, Producer, Actor, Editor, entrepreneur

San Banarje is an American filmmaker. He was born in Kolkata, India to an orthodox Bengali Hindu Brahmin, family but never practiced any religion and went on to produce several Christian films. A resident of Houston, Texas, San is also an entrepreneur.

== Films ==
In late 2009, he shot the thriller Bodhisattva, once again starring Soumitra Chatterjee in Calcutta which he co-wrote with partner Trisha Ray, directed, shot, produced and acted in. The film won the Platinum Remi award at the Houston Worldfest International Film Festival, Best of the Fest at Gulf Coast Film Festival, Best Foreign Film at Alexandria Film Festival, Best Film at Bare Bones Film Festival where San received an Indie Auteur award.

In the summer of 2011, San co-produced the film "Inside Out" with producing partner and writer Brian Stewart. A month later, he wrote and directed the film The Nowhere Son starring Soumitra Chatterjee, and himself in the lead. Eminent movie critic Joe Leydon named the film in his list of 'Five Not to Miss Movies at Worldfest 2013'. The film also garnered rave reviews when screened at Hoboken International Film Festival.

In 2015, San directed and produced the comedy 'A Curry on an American Plate' with actors Rick Fox, Andrea Guasch and Charlie O'Connell on a screenplay that he co-wrote with Trisha Ray, based on a story that he had written back in 2007.

== Awards ==
Year	Award	Category	Nominated work	Result
2008	Bayou City Inspirational Film Festival	Honorable Mention	The Enemy Inside	Won
2010	Worldfest Houston International Film Festival	Platinum Remi	Bodhisattva	Won
2010	Hoboken International Film Festival	Best Screenplay	Bodhisattva	Nominated
2010	Hoboken International Film Festival	Best Direction	Bodhisattva	Nominated
2010	Hoboken International Film Festival	Best Feature	Bodhisattva	Nominated
2010	Alexandria Film Festival	Best Foreign Film	Bodhisattva	Won
2011	Staten Island International Film Festival	Best Screenplay	Bodhisattva	Nominated
2011	Staten Island International Film Festival	Best Thriller	Bodhisattva	Nominated
2011	Bare Bones Film Festival	Indie Auteur Award	Bodhisattva	Won
2011	Bare Bones Film Festival	Best Foreign Film	Bodhisattva	Won
2011	Mexico International Film Festival	Bronze Palm	Bodhisattva	Won
2011	Worldfest Houston International Film Festival	Silver Remi, experimental/dogma	Money	Won
2012	Worldfest Houston International Film Festival	Gold Remi	Inside Out	Won
2012	Worldfest Houston International Film Festival	Gold Remi	Semper Fi	Won

== Filmography ==
- Flipped (2000) Feature (actor, producer, executive producer)
- The Mission (2004) Short (director, cinematographer, actor, writer, producer)
- Closure (2005) Short (producer)
- The Enemy Inside (2005) Short (director, writer, producer)
- Striking Range (2006) Feature (actor)
- Bleep Love (2006) Feature (actor, producer, executive producer)
- Money (2007) Feature (director, cinematographer, producer, executive producer)
- Federal Case (2007) Feature (cinematographer, producer)
- Stanislavski in September (2008) short (cinematographer, producer)
- Train (2008) short (writer, director, cinematographer, producer)
- Sugarbaby (2009) Feature (actor, cinematographer, producer)
- Terracotta (2009) short(director, actor)
- Bodhisattva (2009) feature (writer, director, actor, cinematographer, producer, executive producer)
- Cleaning Up (2010) short (writer, director, cinematographer, producer )
- Inside Out (2011) Feature (actor, producer)
- The Nowhere Son (2011) Feature ( writer, director, cinematographer, producer, actor)
- Marcha Atras (2011) short (executive producer)
- Semper Fi (2012) short ( writer, director, cinematographer, producer)
- Detect Early Save Life (2012) PSA (writer, director, producer)
- Physiotherapy (2013) short (actor)
- Artisse (2013) feature (cinematographer, producer)
- Sex, Marriage and Infidelity (2014) feature (cinematographer, producer)
- The Shadow Behind You (2015) feature - Maggie (writer, director, cinematographer, actor, producer, executive producer)
- A Curry on an American Plate (2017) feature (writer, director, cinematographer, producer, executive producer)
- Orphan Train (2017) feature (actor, producer)
