= Mark Titus =

American author and podcast host

Personal information
- Born: June 25, 1987 (age 39) Brownsburg, Indiana, U.S.
- Listed height: 6 ft 4 in (1.93 m)
- Listed weight: 210 lb (95 kg)

Career information
- High school: Brownsburg (Brownsburg, Indiana)
- College: Ohio State (2006–2010)
- NBA draft: 2010: undrafted
- Position: Shooting guard / small forward

Mark Titus (born June 25, 1987) is an American author, podcast host, and former walk-on basketball player at Ohio State.

== Basketball career ==
Titus played high school basketball at Brownsburg High School (BHS) in Brownsburg, Indiana. For Brownsburg High, Titus scored more than 1,000 career points. There are only four other 1,000 point scorers in BHS history, including former NBA player Gordon Hayward. He was voted second team All-Indiana selection twice. He played on the same AAU team as future NBA players Daequan Cook, Eric Gordon, Josh McRoberts, Mike Conley, and Greg Oden.

In the fall of 2006, Titus enrolled at Ohio State University, where he planned on attending medical school and working as a student manager for the basketball team. He was subsequently added to the roster by coach Thad Matta as a walk-on, and was cleared to play for the Buckeyes on November 10. In the Buckeyes' season opener, Titus received three minutes of playing time and made each of his two free throw attempts. Titus played in 14 of the team's 39 games.

In the 2007–2008 season, Mark was named to the Academic All-Big Ten team.

=== College basketball statistics ===
Season	School	GP	MIN	FGM	FGA	FTM	FTA	3PM	3PA	REB	AST	BLK	STL	PF	TO	PTS
2006-07	Ohio State	14	18	1	2	2	2	1	2	2	2	2	1	3	0	5
2007-08	Ohio State	8	10	1	1	0	0	1	1	1	0	0	0	1	0	3
2008-09	Ohio State	2	2	0	0	0	0	0	0	1	0	0	1	0	0	0
2009-10	Ohio State	8	18	0	3	1	2	0	3	1	1	0	0	1	0	1
CAREER TOTALS		32	48	2	6	3	4	2	6	5	3	2	2	5	0	9

== Post-college basketball ==
=== Harlem Globetrotters ===
Following his college career and the popularity of his videos on social media, Titus was invited to try out for the Harlem Globetrotters. Globetrotters CEO Kurt Schneider cited Titus's basketball skills and online humor as reasons for the invitation. Titus did not make the team.

== Media ==
=== Club Trillion ===
During the 2008–2009 Ohio State basketball season, Titus created his own blog, "Club Trillion", with the name referring to his line in the box score for many games: '1' in the first column (minutes played), followed by zeroes in the other twelve columns (points, rebounds, etc.). Titus' blog, and his antics as a player, gained him some attention in the sports media. Titus had many of his followers join him in growing mustaches and pictures were posted on his blog. He appeared on ESPN.com's 'BS Report' with Bill Simmons on March 11, 2009, and again on March 24, 2010. On April 9, 2009, Titus, although a walk-on with no hopes of playing in the NBA, used his blog to formally announce his entrance into the 2009 NBA draft. The blog entry eventually became a headline story on Yahoo!’s home page.

During his senior season, Titus received cheers from opposing fans, and received coverage from opposing school newspapers. Titus was mentioned in the New York Times and the Associated Press. Titus has also made comedic jabs at teammate Evan Turner. Titus' "Mr. Rainmaker" video on YouTube has received over 580,000 views.

After graduating, Jimmy Kimmel and Bill Simmons—being fans of "Club Trillion"—flew Titus to Hollywood and had him sign with their agent James "Babydoll" Dixon. This led to Mark releasing his first book entitled "Don't Put Me In, Coach: My Incredible NCAA Journey from the End of the Bench to the End of the Bench" on March 6, 2012. The book tells the story of his time as a benchwarmer at Ohio State.

=== Grantland ===
In 2012, Titus began writing for Grantland, a sports journalism and pop culture website affiliated with ESPN and run by Bill Simmons.

=== The Ringer and podcasting ===
Titus joined Bill Simmons' new website, The Ringer, in 2016, where he wrote periodic columns and co-hosted a college basketball podcast, first known as T’d Up and later as One Shining Podcast, with Tate Frazier.

=== Fox Sports ===
Titus announced his departure from The Ringer shortly after Tate Frazier's departure in 2019. In early 2020, Titus and Frazier announced that they would be continuing their podcast through Fox Sports' Westwood One network, under the name "Titus and Tate."

=== 3X3U Tournament ===
In 2018, Titus and Frazier became the inaugural hosts of the 3X3U Tournament, a 3-on-3 basketball tournament held annually at the time and location of the corresponding Final Four, and the winning team receives a cash prize.

=== Barstool Sports ===
Titus joined Barstool Sports in February 2023. He currently co-hosts Mostly Sports along with Brandon Walker, as well as Mostly Hoops, a college basketball centric show on the Mostly Sports network on Barstoool. He is a part of the "& Co." on the Yak with Dan "Big Cat" Katz and co-hosted by Kyle Bauer (KB NoSwag). Titus was a team member of the Smockin Dozen Trivia Team from 2021 to 2025. In 2025, he founded the Mostly Trivia Dozen Trivia Team. In 2026, he became part of the Markettes trivia team, replacing Frank The Tank on the previously named Frank and Frankettes. Titus also co-wrote A NYT ("New Yak Tale") Best Seller, with Dan "Big Cat" Katz, and the rest of the Yak Co. He is the co-host of the Thursday line-up of Wake Up Barstool along with PFT Commenter, Jersey Jerry (Gerard Gilfone), and T-Bob Hebert.

== Philanthropy ==
Titus used his Club Trillion blog to sell "Club Tril" t-shirts through the clothing manufacturer, Homage. Titus states that he has raised over $75,000 for charity through shirt sales. Titus was unable to profit from shirt sales as a student-athlete, so he instead began donating the proceeds to A Kid Again, a charity providing recreational therapy for children with life-threatening illnesses.

In 2019, Titus founded the Club Trillion Foundation, which is dedicated to offering assistance to walk-on athletes by highlighting athletic achievements, providing help with professional development, and financial assistance. In its first year, the foundation awarded a $15,000 scholarship.

== Personal life ==
Titus was born and raised in Brownsburg, Indiana, to Bill and Laura (née Newcomb) Titus. His father is a high school basketball coach, athletic director, and Indiana Hoosiers fan. His mother is a middle school teacher and former Purdue women's basketball player. Titus' mother was inducted into the Indiana Basketball Hall of Fame in 2011 for her accolades at Purdue.

== Bibliography ==
=== Non-fiction ===
- 2012: Don't Put Me In, Coach: My Incredible NCAA Journey from the End of the Bench to the End of the Bench

=== Fiction ===
- 2023: A NYT Best Seller: A New Yak Tale
