= Trisha Ray =

American film director

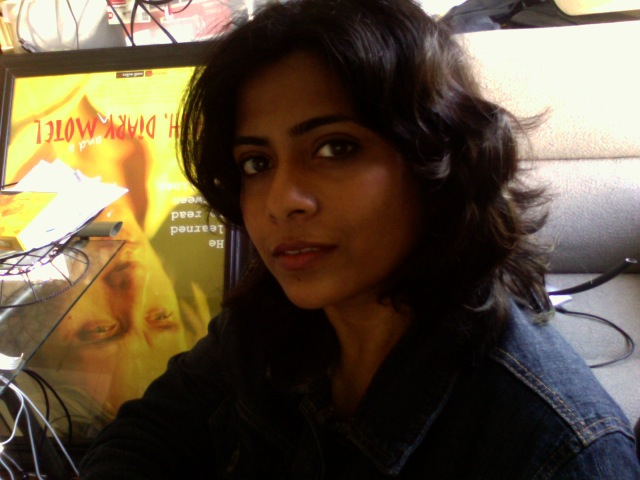
- Occupations: Filmmaker, Screenwriter, Producer, Actress, Editor, Sound Designer, and Charcoal Artist.

Trisha Ray is an independent producer, screenwriter, filmmaker, actress, editor, sound designer, and charcoal artist.

In 2022, Ray finished the pilot episode of her 8-episode comedy series RECAST starring Lorelei Linklater, Eric Roberts, San Banarje and Harry S. Murphy, but production got stalled due to the Sag-Aftra strike. Filming revived in 2025.

== Films ==
During her freshman year, while in California working at a printing press, Ray used her free time to complete her first feature-length screenplay Hola Armando and decided to quit school to pursue film production. She started interning for different production companies and learned every aspect of film production from being on set as a runner or production assistant, editor's help, demonstrator of new software and technologies at mall showrooms, until she was hired by a television network as an in-house producer.

In winter 2009, Ray and Banarje wrote a psychological thriller titled Bodhisattva, with Soumitra Chatterjee in the title role. Ray wanted to play the role of Maya, but director San Banarje was not convinced by Ray's performance at the rehearsals and gave her the first day of shoot to prove herself, while looking for other actors to replace her on the second day. Her first day of shoot impressed the director and she did not need to get replaced. The entire film was shot in the home of Ray's mother who stayed in one room with their family pup Kalia until the day's shoot was over.

In 2013, she co-wrote the thriller The Shadow Behind You, with San Banarje. This was followed by the 2013 Fall film Artisse written by Brian Stewart, that she directed. In winter 2013, she co-produced, and edited the dramedy Sex, Marriage and Infidelity for director-writer Richard Finger, starring actors Charlie O'Connell, Shannon Tweed, and her daughter with Gene Simmons, Sophie Simmons. All three films were released in 2014.

In 2015, Ray co-wrote the feature A Curry on an American Plate with the film's director San Banarje. The film starred Rick Fox, Charlie O'Connell and Andrea Guasch. In 2018 and 2019, Ray wrote and directed the thriller 6 Rounds of Chloe with Kamala Lopez and San Banarje in lead roles, and Alexandra Goel in the title role of Chloe. In 2020, Ray and San started their comedy series RECAST. The show, that was to shoot in Los Angeles, had to be delayed due to coronavirus, and filming started in November 2020 in Houston.

== Filmography ==
Year	Title	Creadited as					Role	Notes
Year	Title	Director	Producer	Writer	Editor	Actor	Role	Notes
2000	Flipped	Yes	Yes	Yes	No	No		
2004	Rebecca on the Phone	Yes	Yes	Yes	Yes	No		Short film
2005	Closure	Yes	Yes	Yes	Yes	No		Short film
2006	Bleep Love	Yes	Yes	Yes	Yes	Yes		
2006	Bong Connection	No	Yes	No	No	No		
2007	Money	No	No	No	Yes	Yes	Ira	
2007	Federal Case	Yes	Yes	No	No	No		
2008	Stanislavski in September	Yes	No	No	Yes	No		Short film
2008	Train	No	No	No	Yes	No		Short film
2009	Sugarbaby	Yes	Yes	No	No	No		
2009	Terracotta	No	No	No	Yes	Yes	hitchhiker	Short film
2009	Bodhisattva	No	Yes	Yes	Yes	Yes	Maya	
2010	Cleaning Up	No	No	No	Yes	No		Short film
2011	Inside Out	No	Yes	No	No	No		
2011	The Nowhere Son	No	No	No	Yes	Yes	Asha	
2011	Marcha Atras	Yes	Yes	Yes	Yes	No		Short film
2012	Detect Early Save Life	No	No	Yes	Yes	No		PSA
2013	Physiotherapy	Yes	No	Yes	Yes	No		Short film
2014	Artisse	Yes	Yes	No	No	No		
2015	The Shadow Behind You	No	Yes	Yes	Yes	Yes	Maggie	
2015	Sex, Marriage and Infidelity	No	Yes	No	Yes	No		also casting director
2017	A Curry on an American Plate	No	Yes	Yes	Yes	No		also casting director
2017	Orphan Train	Yes	Yes	No	Yes	No		also casting director
2018	6 Rounds of Chloe	Yes	Yes	Yes	No	Yes		also casting director
2020	Recast	Yes	Yes	Yes	Yes	No		also casting director

|}
