= Bernard J. Berry =

American politician (1902–1963)

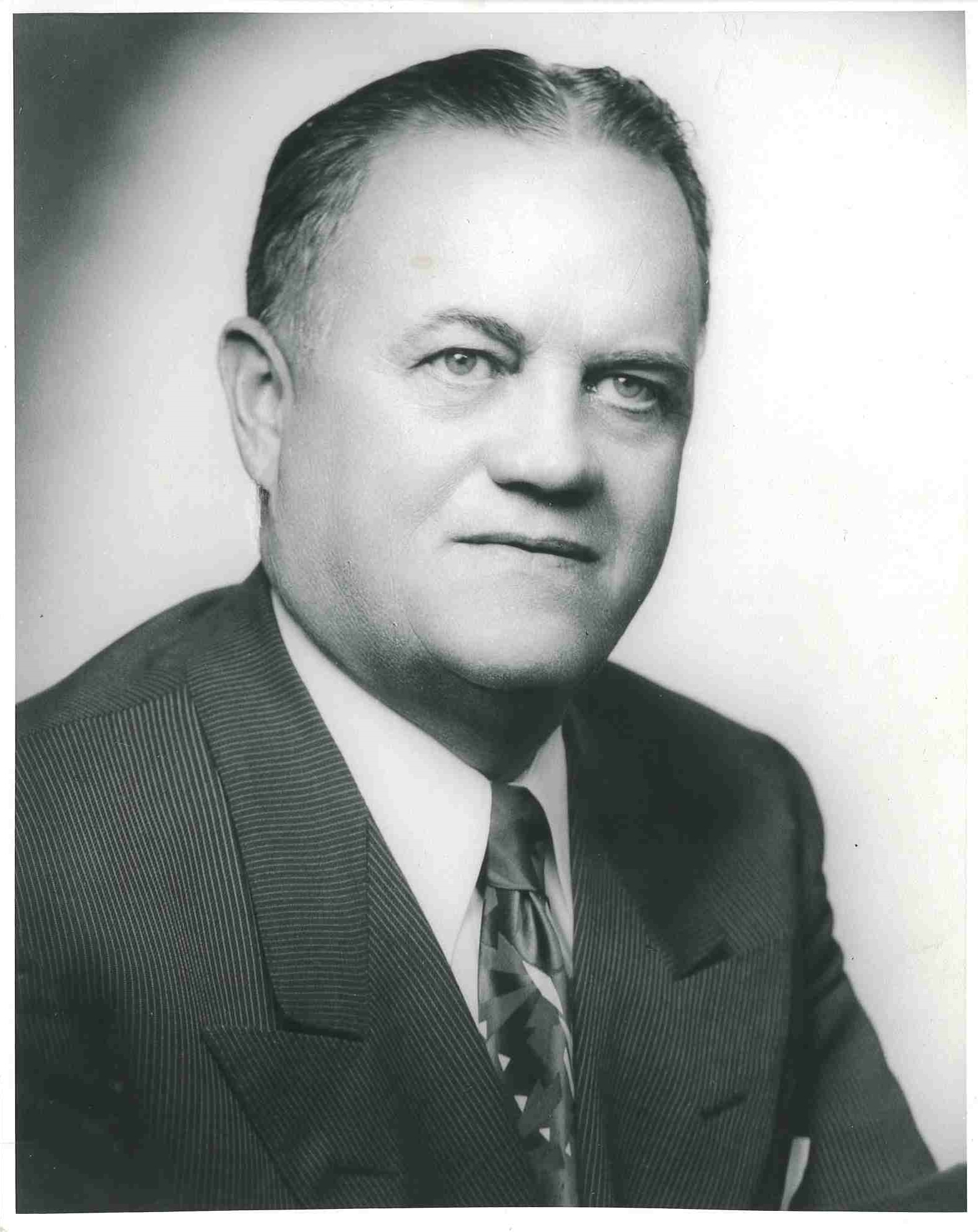

33rd Mayor of Jersey City
- In office December 15, 1953 – May 21, 1957
- Preceded by: John V. Kenny
- Succeeded by: Charles S. Witkowski

Personal details
- Born: October 2, 1902 Jersey City, New Jersey
- Died: January 6, 1963 (aged 60) Jersey City, New Jersey
- Party: Democratic
- Spouse: Cecila Mulvoy (1911-1996)
- Children: Bernard J. Jr., Nancy, Eileen, Marie, Kathy

Bernard J. Berry (October 2, 1902 – January 6, 1963) was an American Democratic Party politician who served as the 33rd mayor of Jersey City, New Jersey from 1953 to 1957. He took office following the resignation of John V. Kenny.

== Biography ==
He was born on July 3, 1913, in the working class downtown section known as the Horseshoe, Jersey City. At age 14 he began work for the Lehigh Valley Railroad, eventually becoming operating agent. During World War II he expedited the movement of thousands of tons of war materials.

Active in the 1929 and 1933 campaigns against Jersey City’s long-serving Mayor and political Boss Frank Hague, he joined the effort of former Hague ally turned opponent John V. Kenny in the insurgent campaign that defeated Hague’s chosen successor in 1949. After the victory, Kenny appointed Berry to the Board of Education, and then to the Commission itself as Public Safety Director on the death of James F. Murray Sr. In the election of 1953, Berry was one of three Kenny candidates elected to the five-person Commission. In the aftermath of Kenny’s surprise resignation from the Commission, Berry was ultimately chosen as Mayor.

Berry achieved a level of notoriety for having banned both rock and roll music as well as an "obscene" film from Jersey City during his tenure. In 1953, then–Public Safety Director Berry banned the film The Moon Is Blue from being shown for being "indecent and obscene". In 1956, Mayor Berry refused to allow Bill Haley and the Comets to play a concert at municipally owned Roosevelt Stadium. The latter act is believed to have inspired Haley to release what some have called the first protest song in rock and roll, "Teenager's Mother," which included the lyrics "Are you right? Did you forget too soon? How much you liked to do the Charleston?"

In 1956, after the 1954 closing of the US immigration station, Berry commandeered a US Coast Guard cutter and led a contingent of New Jersey officials on an expedition to claim Ellis Island. This publicity stunt laid the groundwork for New Jersey's claim to ownership of the island, culminating in the 1998 New Jersey v. New York Supreme Court decision identifying 83% of the island as New Jersey land. Berry's vision of an immigration museum, as opposed to New York's plan for homeless shelters, ultimately won out with the National Park Service.

As the only member of the Kenny-backed ticket to be elected in 1957, he lost the position of mayor and became Commissioner of Parks and Public Property. In what would be his final term in public office he advocated for a change of the form of government under the Faulkner Act, ultimately introducing the resolution which changed the structure to the current Mayor-Council form. Ironically, in the first election under the new form of government, in 1961, he was defeated for the mayoralty. In that year he served as President of the New Jersey State League of Municipalities before returning to private life, running an insurance business until his death by cerebral hemorrhage on January 6, 1963.
