= Bodhisattva (film) =

2010 Indian Bengali film

- Film poster
- Bodhisattva or Interrogation of a Husband (American title)
- Directed by: San Banarje
- Screenplay by: San Banarje; Trisha Ray
- Story by: San Banarje; Trisha Ray
- Produced by: San Banarje; Trisha Ray
- Cinematography: San Banarje
- Edited by: Trisha Ray
- Release date: 2010
- Country: India
- Language: Bengali

Bodhisattva or "Interrogation of a Husband" is a 2010 independent film directed by San Banarje and written by Trisha Ray and San Banarje. The film stars Soumitra Chatterjee in the title role and Trisha Ray as his daughter. The film was shot in seven days and edited in one month. The world premiere of film was on 19 April 2010 at the Worldfest Houston International Film Festival where it won the Platinum Remi Award. The English title is 'Interrogation of a Husband.'

== Storyline ==
Maya (Trisha Ray) has not been able to forgive her father Bodhisattva (Soumitra Chatterjee) for her mother's suicide. So when she comes home from the United States after a long time, instead of staying with him, she puts up with an old classmate Anu (Miska Halim) and her husband Avik (San Banarje). What begins as a fun visit, soon turns into a psychological battle between the trio and peaks to a shattering climax. A story about human relationships encircling ego, pride, power and obsession, the film takes a look at urban India with its modern family setup.

== Plot ==
The film starts with Avik (San Banarje) being interrogated by a police investigator in a police station in Calcutta, India about his wife Anu's murder, which Avik believes to be suicide as no one else was in the house at the time of her death. The investigator asks him about the guest who was staying with them for a couple of weeks and Avik tells him, her name is Maya and her father's name is Bodhisattva.

The next hour introduces the mysterious Maya (Trisha Ray) whose frequent visits with her business tycoon father Bodhisattva (Soumitra Chatterjee) reveal the equally mysterious relationship between the two. Slowly it emerges that Maya has not been able to forgive her father for her mother's death and that is why she does not stay with him while visiting India from the United States. There is also an Electra complex noticed in her relationship with her father.

As she continues to live with Anu and her husband Avik, we are exposed to her attraction toward Avik that disbalances the otherwise harmonious co-habitation of the couple.

Meantime, Avik, an aspiring filmmaker continues to find producers for his new screenplay and meets Producer Roy (Biswajit Chakraborty) who takes a liking to him because of his interest in soccer and particularly in the legendary football star Diego Maradona whose picture on Roy's desk amuses Avik. Roy pressurizes Avik to make changes to his artistic script to make it more commercial.

At home, Maya accuses Anu of cheating on Avik, thereby causing more rift in the family, and finally is asked to leave their home. When Avik does not give in to her moves, a devastated Maya turns to Bodhisattva for advice. Bodhisattva tells her "Defeat is not an option" and urges her to do whatever is necessary to prove to him that she is his worthy daughter. However, when she acts according to her father's want, a furious Bodhisattva turns her away, calling her 'weak' and 'at fault.' An argument follows between the father and daughter that leads to a buried past.

The investigator follows Avik's directions and goes to Bodhisattva's house in search of Maya. The film ends with more revelations that leaves him speechless.

== Cast ==
- Soumitra Chatterjee as Bodhisattva
- Trisha Ray as Maya
- San Banarje as Avik
- Mishka Halim as Anu
- Biswajit Chakraborty as Producer Roy
- Sankar Roy Chowdhury as Bar Owner Anjan
- Dibyaroop Roy as Gun Dealer
- Sambhu Munshi as Bodhisattva's Landlord

== Production ==
The film was conceived in October 2009 by San Banarje and Trisha Ray and shot in 6 1/2 days in November 2009.

San and Trisha wanted to create a story surrounding veteran actor Soumitra Chatterjee, after working with him in a film titled Sugarbaby that was shot in India earlier that year.

Casting began when Soumitra agreed to do the role of Bodhisattva, under the direction of San Banarje. Actress Mishka Halim who plays Anu, was picked by San from a TV series shoot. It was her first feature film. The voice of her character was dubbed by voice actress Namita. It was Soumitra who asked San to play the role of Avik. Trisha wanted to play the role of Maya but San was not convinced that Trisha was right for the part of Maya, as she was not able to project the character he had in mind during reads. After the first day of shoot, San confirmed Trisha as Maya.

The entire film was shot in Trisha's mother's house in Kolkata.

The production did not have enough budget for on-location sound recordist, so the film was entirely dubbed at a sound studio in Kolkata, and synced in Houston. Due to the lack of budget, the film could only hire a very small number of crew, whom they had earlier worked with in Sugarbaby. Being the actor, director and cinematographer of the film, during his own scenes, San had to set up the camera with a stand-in and then have his Assistant DoP Gairik or their camera assistant Surinder operate it. Trisha did the final sound design and mixing in Houston.

The film changed its story several times during post-production, and found its final shape during test screening in Houston, when they returned to the United States.

The film premiered in April 2010 to a full house at AMC Studio 30, as part of Worldfest Houston International film festival, which happens each year in their hometown. The film won a Platinum Award at the festival.

== Film festivals and awards ==
Bodhisattva went on to win seven awards and several nominations in many national and international film festivals including Houston, New Jersey, Virginia, New York, Oklahoma, Vancouver, Mexico, and Spain.

== Track ==
The only music piece used in Bodhisattva is an opera piece 'Questo Amor,' originally composed by Puccini and performed by Welsh musician Paul Carey Jones.
