= The Nowhere Son =

The Nowhere Son is an Indian/American independent film written, shot and directed by San Banarje starring Soumitra Chatterjee, Trisha Ray, San Banarje and Biswajit Chakraborty. The film, produced by Next Actor Studio, Houston, was shot in India and United States in cities such as Calcutta, Kashi, Houston, Galveston and New Orleans.

San Banarje in "The Nowhere Son".

The film is listed in movie critic Joe Leydon's list of 'Five movies not to miss at Worldfest Houston'.

== Plot ==
Physician Sanjay Chakroborty (San Banarje) lives in Calcutta with his professor father Anil (Soumitra Chatterjee) in a centrally located house owned by their family for decades. The corrupt minister Maity (Biswajit Chakraborty) wants to acquire their plot for making a luxury hotel. However, the professor is against selling the house. Within a few days, Anil goes missing. Now Sanjay gives up everything in search of his father.

== Production ==
While filming in Kashi (Varanasi), director San Banarje was detained by the local police for pointing the camera at a Hindu temple without permit. He was released after two hours.This is the third film that San Banarje and Trisha Ray shot with Soumitra Chatterjee.

== Cast ==
- Soumitra Chatterjee
- San Banarje
- Biswajit Chakraborty
- Trisha Ray
- Samba Banerjee
- Sankar Roy Chowdhury
- Dibyaroop Roy
- Ramasankar Paul
- Suman Nandy
- Sukanto Bhattacharya
- Shahab Peer
- Thiago Paes

== Crew ==
- Producers : San Banarje and Trisha Ray
- Writer : San Banarje
- Director : San Banarje
- Cinematographer : San Banarje
- Editor : Trisha Ray
- Sound : Gautam Nag
- Music : Gianmarco Leone
- Production Manager : Sambhu Munshi

== Screenings ==
The film first premiered in Houston at the Worldfest Houston International Film Festival in April 2013 where it was named as "Top Five Not to Miss Movies at Worldfest" by critic Joe Leydon. In June 2013, it played at the Hoboken International Film Festival in New York. Writer-Director San Banarje was interviewed by Garden State Journal prior to the screening. In November 2013, the film was screened at Alexandria, Virginia for Alexandria Film Festival.
