= Pardon My Take =

American sports podcast

- Genre: Sports comedy
- Language: English

Cast and voices
- Hosted by: PFT Commenter; Dan "Big Cat" Katz

Production
- Length: 120–180 minutes

Publication
- Original release: February 29, 2016
- Provider: Barstool Sports
- Updates: Thrice weekly (M, W, F)

Related
- Website: www.barstoolsports.com/shows/11/pardon-my-take

Pardon My Take (abbreviated "PMT") is a comedic sports podcast released three times per week by Barstool Sports. It is hosted by Dan Katz ("Big Cat") and PFT Commenter. The podcast debuted on February 29, 2016. It first appeared on the US iTunes charts on March 2, 2016, in the number one position.

The podcast's audience generally ranges between 750,000 and 1.5 million listeners per episode. In 2016, Apple named Pardon My Take one of the best podcasts of 2016, and in 2017, The Big Lead ranked Katz and PFT Commenter as the number one sports media talents under 40. In 2018, Pardon My Take was the 14th most downloaded podcast of the year on iTunes.

Pardon My Take listeners are affectionally referred to as "AWLs" or award-winning listeners, in reference to the "Podcast Listeners of the Year" award, given out by the podcast yearly on its award show spoof episode, "The Takies".

== History ==
Pardon My Take was first launched in February 2016 when PFT Commenter left the sports website SB Nation to join Barstool Sports. Longtime Barstool contributor Big Cat had been regularly communicating with PFT Commenter through Twitter prior to 2016 and the two teamed up to create Pardon My Take.

Since its inception, Pardon My Take has used satire to comment on traditional sports media, particularly ESPN and some of its notable personalities. The show's name is a play on the titles of ESPN television shows Pardon the Interruption and First Take. The logo of the podcast, which took graphic elements from the two ESPN shows, prompted ESPN to send a cease-and-desist letter to Barstool Sports soon after the launch of the podcast. Barstool did change the logo.

Beginning in early March 2020, Pardon My Take began to be affected by the COVID-19 virus, as it is a podcast that revolves around current events in the sporting world. To keep the show interesting and running 3 days a week (Monday, Wednesday, and Friday), PFT Commenter and Big Cat implemented a new segment, usually at the end of the podcast, to review popular TV shows such as "Love Is Blind", documentaries such as "Tiger King" and "The King of Kong: Fistful of Quarters", and movies such as the comedy sports film "The Garbage Picking Field Goal Kicker". The two co-hosts still provide interviews with popular sports figures and other celebrities in each episode. They also implemented a Dungeons and Dragons segment on May 23, 2020, with Timm Woods as the Dungeon Master. The sports hiatus also signaled the beginning of the "Mount Flushmore" series, a play on their "Mount Rushmores"' of the past, some of the topics they used have been fears, places to be drunk, toppings, appetizers, and states of the United States of America.

In 2025, Pardon My Take was the most popular sports podcast based on online popularity and ratings/reviews from Spotify and Apple.

Beginning in January 2026, Pardon My Take began airing its video podcasts exclusively featured on Netflix.

In March 2026, Pardon My Take won "Best Sports Podcast" at the IHeartRadio Podcast Awards.

== Format ==
Most Pardon My Take episodes consist of three parts. The hosts open the show with a recap of current sports news. News is followed by an interview with a sports personality, celebrity, journalist, or athlete. Frequent guests include Ryan Whitney, Blake Bortles, Blake Griffin, Brooks Koepka, Mark Titus, Ryen Russillo, Chris Long, Mike Florio, Jerry O’Connell, Scott Van Pelt, Dan Haren, and Max Homa. The show is closed with a collection of recurring original segments which vary episode to episode. Popular segments include: "Hot Seat, Cool Throne", "Who's Back of the Week", "Fyre Fest of the Week", and "Guys on Chicks". Occasionally, the Pardon My Take hosts will alter the show's format for special episodes, including their yearly recap show and their annual award show since 2016, the "Takies." The hosts have held video exit interviews with their guests. Most of the interviews throughout 2016 concluded by Big Cat asking the guest three questions—if the guest washed their apples, who the most famous person in the guest's cell phone was, and a third question tailored to each guest. This third question was often the most provocative one of the interview and began with Big Cat saying "a question I'm gonna ask, that you don't have to answer, but I'm gonna ask anyway."

For most of its history, the show opened by playing "Electric Avenue" by Eddy Grant and closed by playing (an often re-mixed version of) "Take On Me" by A-ha. In the August 27, 2024 episode, both songs were conspicuously absent, replaced by the PMT YouTube intro and outro music, and have not been heard on the podcast since. They were removed due to copyright issues.

== Staff ==
=== Hosts ===
Hosts	Years	Notes
Dan "Big Cat" Katz	Feb. 2016–Present	
PFT Commenter (Eric Sollenberger)	Feb. 2016–Present	
Henry "Hank" Lockwood	Feb. 2016–Present	Current third-chair; former producer

=== Booth Staff ===
Staff	Years	Role	Notes
Henry "Hank" Lockwood	Feb. 2016-2022 (as producer)	Head producer	Stopped being the producer when Liam was brought in. Stopped completely as producer when Max took over.
Liam "Bubba" Henley	2017-2022	Producer	Was replaced by Max Dolente and became a general Barstool producer
Pug (Evan Winkler)	2022-2026	Editor	Left the podcast in 2026 and moved to the Barstool New York office
Max Dolente	2022–Present	Head producer	The current main producer of the show; originally interviewed to be Dave Portnoy's producer
Memes	2021–Present	Social Media	Original ran a fan account until the podcast officially hired him
Shane Amerio	2022–Present	Graphics	His favorite color is turquoise
Zac Cornelius	2025–Present	Vibes/Misc.	Hired by Big Cat to be on the Barstool Chicago "Cream Team." Originally interviewed with Jon Gruden
Kolten Jones	2026–Present	Editor	Took over for Pug; was already working at Barstool as a producer; former prank content creator
Jack Wyper	Oct. 2024–Present	Editor	

=== Former Interns ===
Intern	Years	Notes
Jack Kennedy (KenJac)	2016-2017	First PMT intern; former host of Lights, Camera, Barstool
Billy Football (William Cotter)	May 2017-Aug. 2017; Apr. 2020-July 2023 (suspended for June 2022)	Left the podcast when it moved to Chicago
Jake Marsh	May 2018 - Aug. 2018; Apr. 2020 - June 2024	Initially hired to parody Darren Rovell. Left the podcast to pursue a Play by Play Announcer dream
Jilly Football	2019-2020	"Senior" intern
Hewy	2024-2024	Had a very brief intern stint of only a few weeks. Terms of his departure being investigated by Jerry O'Connell.

== Lottery Ball Machine ==
=== History ===
On August 28, 2020, Big Cat introduced a Ping-Pong Ball Lottery Machine to the Pardon My Take studio, creating a popular new segment. At the end of each show, hosts Big Cat and PFT Commenter, along with supporting staff members Billy Football, Jake Marsh, PMTMemes, Liam "Bubba" Crowley, Hank, and producer Max, would each guess a number between 1 and 100.

In 2024, AWL DechDotDev launched a website to track the Lottery Ball Machine's history, aptly named Pardon My Balls. The results are now officially recorded on this platform.

The original lottery ball drawings in the New York office ran from August 28, 2020, to October 23, 2023. After relocating to the Chicago office in September 2023, all drawings from October 25, 2023, onward have been officially conducted in the new studio.

=== Memorable Moments ===
Billy Football became the first to guess correctly, selecting 69 on December 4, 2020.

Over the next two years, all members of the podcast eventually guessed correctly—except Hank, whose streak of incorrect guesses lasted an astounding 988 days. That streak finally ended on May 12, 2023, when Hank correctly guessed the number 6.

On November 8, 2023, Hank made history by being the first to guess correctly on the new lottery ball machine in the Chicago office. His winning number, 52, was chosen in honor of the Khalil Mack bobblehead displayed in the studio.

During the show on April 25, 2024, Dan "Big Cat" Katz correctly guessed the lottery ball, selecting number 13 to honor Caleb Williams’ college number on the night he was drafted first overall in the 2024 NFL Draft by the Chicago Bears. The guess symbolized the hope and greatness Williams is expected to bring to the city. This marked Katz's second win with the new lottery ball machine, as his first win had been vacated following complaints from producer Max.

On December 4, 2024, following a prior executive order from President Pug, PFT and Memes were mandated to choose each other's lottery numbers. In a twist of fate, Memes selected the number 2 for PFT, and against all odds, the number 2 lottery ball was drawn. This marked PFT Commenter's first win in the new office, propelling him back to the top of the overall leaderboards. Meanwhile, Memes’ streak of misfortune continued, extending an impressive four-year drought without picking the correct lottery ball in either studio, despite his arguments that this instance counts as a correct guess (it doesn't).

=== Official Lottery Ball Standings ===
Top Players' Lottery Ball Standings
Name		Total Wins	Mickey Mouse Wins
1	Hank	9	
2	PFT	8	1
3	Big Cat	7	1
4	Pug	6	
5	Jake	6	
6	Shane	6	1
7	Max	5	1
8	Billy	4	
9	Zac	3	
10	Jack	3	
11	Memes	1	
12	Kolten	0	

== Blake of the Year ==
=== History ===
Blake of the Year (BOTY) is an annual competition put on by the PMT crew during the summer Takie Awards. Since 2018, participants have been selected based on whether they display qualities that Big Cat and PFT Commenter believe are typical of people named Blake. Examples of such are: a lax outlook on their profession; seeming to be an average dude; or just having the name Blake (some exceptions apply. See Brooks Koepka).

Originally, the rules for the competition were very simple. During a recording of the show, one of the hosts would call a Blake; whoever picked up first was ruled the winner. The timer would start at the moment of the host dialing and end once the Blake answered the call and spoke into the phone.

=== Competitors ===
Regular participants are Blake Griffin, Blake Bortles and Brooks Koepka.

==== 2018 ====
Blake Bortles recorded a response time of 11.70 seconds while Blake Griffin missed the call after falling asleep on a plane in route to Las Vegas to participate in Team USA's training camp.

==== 2019 ====
This year the competition expanded to include Brooks "Blake" Koepka who reported a debut response time of 7.90 seconds. Blake Bortles was unable to be reached this year while Blake Griffin rebounded astoundingly by posting a record setting response time of 2.80 seconds, a record that still stands to this day.

==== 2020 ====
Blake Bortles posted a response time of 5.75 seconds but was narrowly beaten out by Brooks Koepka who recorded a response time of 5.50 seconds. Despite his competitors' incredibly quick response times, Blake Griffin continued his reign of dominance with a response time of 3.30 seconds, cementing himself as the first back-to-back or "Blake-to-Blake" champion in Blake of the Year history.

==== 2021 ====
In 2021, the rules were changed to a random number draw from a Chinese lottery machine. Each round the Blakes would pick a number 1-100, and if their number was selected they would be ruled the winner.

After an excruciatingly long competition, Blake Bortles became the second two-time winner in Blake of the Year history by having his lottery ball number called after nearly 30 minutes of play.

==== 2022 ====
In 2022, the BOTY competition shifted to a trivia gameshow format, where contestants answered a series of questions, and the Blake with the most correct answers earned the right to call a coin flip to decide the overall winner.

This year, the field narrowed back down to two participants after Brooks Koepka was suspended from competition following his signing with the LIV tour. After three rounds of trivia, Blake Bortles came up short when he failed to list all of the teams Blake Griffin had played for in his career. Griffin, on the other hand, correctly named all of the teams Bortles had played for, edging out the trivia win by a score of 5.5 to 5.

With the trivia victory in hand, Griffin earned the right to call the decisive coin flip, and confidently chose tails. The call was correct, securing his third BOTY title and making him the first three-time champion in the event's history. The win cemented Griffin's legacy, with many hailing his run as the beginning of a true BOTY dynasty.

2023

The 2023 competition introduced a three-round format, one point per round. Round one was impassioned speeches from each Blake on why he deserved the title. Round two was Blake-centric trivia. Round three was a high-speed rhyming showdown using the word "Blake." A tie would be broken by randomized draw from the Chinese lottery machine, a method adopted specifically to avoid repeating the controversial results of the 2021 competition. Each Blake received an equal 33.3 percent share of the numbers, in a race to three.

The speeches opened the showdown, but Blake Bortles edged out the others to take round one, jumping ahead 1–0–0. In round two, all three Blakes answered their trivia questions correctly, but the judges gave the nod to Brooks "Blake" Koepka, leveling the score at 1–1–0.

The third round was where things got wild. The rhyming competition tested each Blake's wit and verbal agility. Koepka stumbled after repeating "lake" twice, an amateur move that led to his elimination and narrowed the field to the original two Blakes. Blake Griffin then dropped a bold rhyme, pairing "Blake" with "copulate," before sealing the round with the clinching word "quake," knotting the contest at 1–1–1 and triggering the tiebreaker.

With lottery balls 1 through 33 assigned to Koepka, 34 through 66 to Bortles, and 67 through 99 to Griffin, Griffin struck first with a draw of 96, going up 1–0–0. But in a stunning come-from-behind run, Bortles rattled off three straight winning draws, 54, 56, and 35, clinching his third BOTY crown and reclaiming his place atop the Blake hierarchy.

==== 2024 ====
In 2024, the rules for the competition reverted to the original format with a new school twist. A Zoom link was sent out at the same time to all three Blakes, whoever connected to the meeting first with both audio and video was declared the winner.

Blake Griffin reclaimed his title by connecting to the Zoom with a lightning-fast response time of 20.19 seconds, securing his fourth championship and reclaiming his sole position at the top of the BOTY scoreboard. Blake Bortles came in close behind with a response time of 47.40 seconds.

Unfortunately, Brooks "Blake" Koepka was unable to be reached this year as he was competing in a LIV golf tournament in the UK.

==== 2025 ====
The 2025 competition followed the same format as the previous year, combining the original rules with a modern twist. A Zoom link was sent simultaneously to all three Blakes, and the first to join with both audio and video would be declared the winner.

Blake Griffin reaffirmed his dominance by logging in with an impressive response time of under 12 seconds, securing his fifth BOTY title. This victory made him the first Blake to achieve back-to-back BOTY wins twice, solidifying his place at the top of the leaderboard. Blake Bortles was a close second, joining just two seconds later with a time of 14 seconds.

Meanwhile, Brooks "Blake" Koepka joined the Zoom call a full 17 minutes later, as he was competing in the 2025 Open Championship in Northern Ireland and in a different time zone.

2026

The 2026 competition used the same Zoom link format as the previous two years, and controversy arose almost immediately. In a photo finish, Blake Griffin was the first competitor to be seen on screen but a screen recording review then determined that Blake Bortles had actually joined the Zoom a single second earlier. Bortles took the crown in a dramatic upset, dethroning the reigning champion and denying him the first three-peat in BOTY history.

Tragically, Brooks "Blake" Koepka joined the Zoom call a full hour and a half later, as he was inebriated in Portugal and in a different time zone.

=== Winners ===
The winner of the competition receives the honor of being the voice of the show's introduction, "It's Pardon My Take presented by Barstool Sports," for every episode of that upcoming year.

Blake of the Year Winners
Year	Winners	Competitors	Structure				
Year	Winners	Competitors	Format	Round 1	Round 2	Round 3	Tiebreaker Round
2018	Blake Bortles	2*	Single Round	Phone Call	−	−	−
2019	Blake Griffin	3	Single Round	Phone Call	−	−	−
2020	Blake Griffin (2)	3	Single Round	Phone Call	−	−	−
2021	Blake Bortles (2)	3	Single Round	Lotto Draw	−	−	−
2022	Blake Griffin (3)	2^{†}	Multiple Rounds	Blake Trivia	Coin Toss	−	−
2023	Blake Bortles (3)	3	Multiple Rounds	Blake Speeches	Blake Trivia	Blake Rhyming	Lotto Draw
2024	Blake Griffin (4)	3	Single Round	Zoom Call	−	−	−
2025	Blake Griffin (5)	3	Single Round	Zoom Call	−	−	−
2026	Blake Bortles (4)	3	Single Round	Zoom Call	−	−	−

Key for Blake of the Year Winners
*	Brooks Koepka didn't compete this year because he was not yet considered a 'Blake'
^{†}	Brooks Koepka was suspended from play in 2022 following his LIV tour signing

Blake of the Year Scoreboard
Name	Wins	Years
Blake Griffin	5	2019, 2020, 2022, 2024, 2025
Blake Bortles	4	2018, 2021, 2023, 2026
Brooks "Blake" Koepka	0	N/A

== Lowman Trophy ==
The podcast presents the annual award for the best college fullback in the nation and sponsored by Chevrolet. Past winners include:

Year	Fullback	School
2025	Max Bredeson	Michigan Wolverines football
2024	Tyler Crowe	Boise State Broncos football
2023	Ben Sinnott	Kansas State Wildcats football
2022	Hunter Luepke	North Dakota State Bison football
2021	John Chenal	Wisconsin Badgers football
2020	JaKobi Buchanan	Army Black Knights football
2019	John Chenal, Derek Watt, Mason Stokke	Wisconsin Badgers football
2018	Ben Mason	Michigan Wolverines football

== Publication ==
- Pardon My Book, Big Cat and PFT Commenter, HarperCollins, 2026.
