= Charles S. Witkowski =

American politician

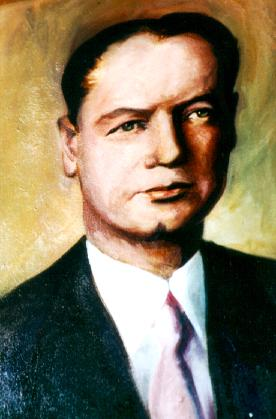

34th Mayor of Jersey City
- In office May 21, 1957 – June 30, 1960
- Preceded by: Bernard J. Berry
- Succeeded by: Thomas Gangemi

Personal details
- Born: Charles Stanley Witkowski; March 4, 1907 Jersey City, New Jersey, US
- Died: June 1, 1993 (aged 86) New York City, NY, US
- Party: Democratic
- Spouse: Florence Witkowski
- Children: 3
- Relatives: Jerry O'Connell (grandson); Charlie O'Connell (grandson)

Charles Stanley Witkowski (March 4, 1907 – June 1, 1993) was mayor of Jersey City from 1957 to 1961.

== Biography ==
Witkowski was born in Jersey City, New Jersey, the son of Blanche and Joseph Witkowski, who were Polish immigrants. He was elected Police Commissioner in 1949, as part of the independent Freedom Ticket that led to the election of John V. Kenny as mayor. Witkowski ran and lost in 1953 in his first bid for mayor, and won his single term in office in 1957.

He received his undergraduate degree at the Villanova University and was awarded a law degree from the John Marshall Law School (now Seton Hall University School of Law). A football player while at Villanova, Witkowski was named an All-American tackle.

Witkowski had a heart attack and died on June 1, 1993, at Saint Vincent's Catholic Medical Center in Manhattan, New York City.

Two of Witkowski's grandsons are actors Jerry O'Connell and Charlie O'Connell.
