= Erika Ayers Badan =

American businessperson

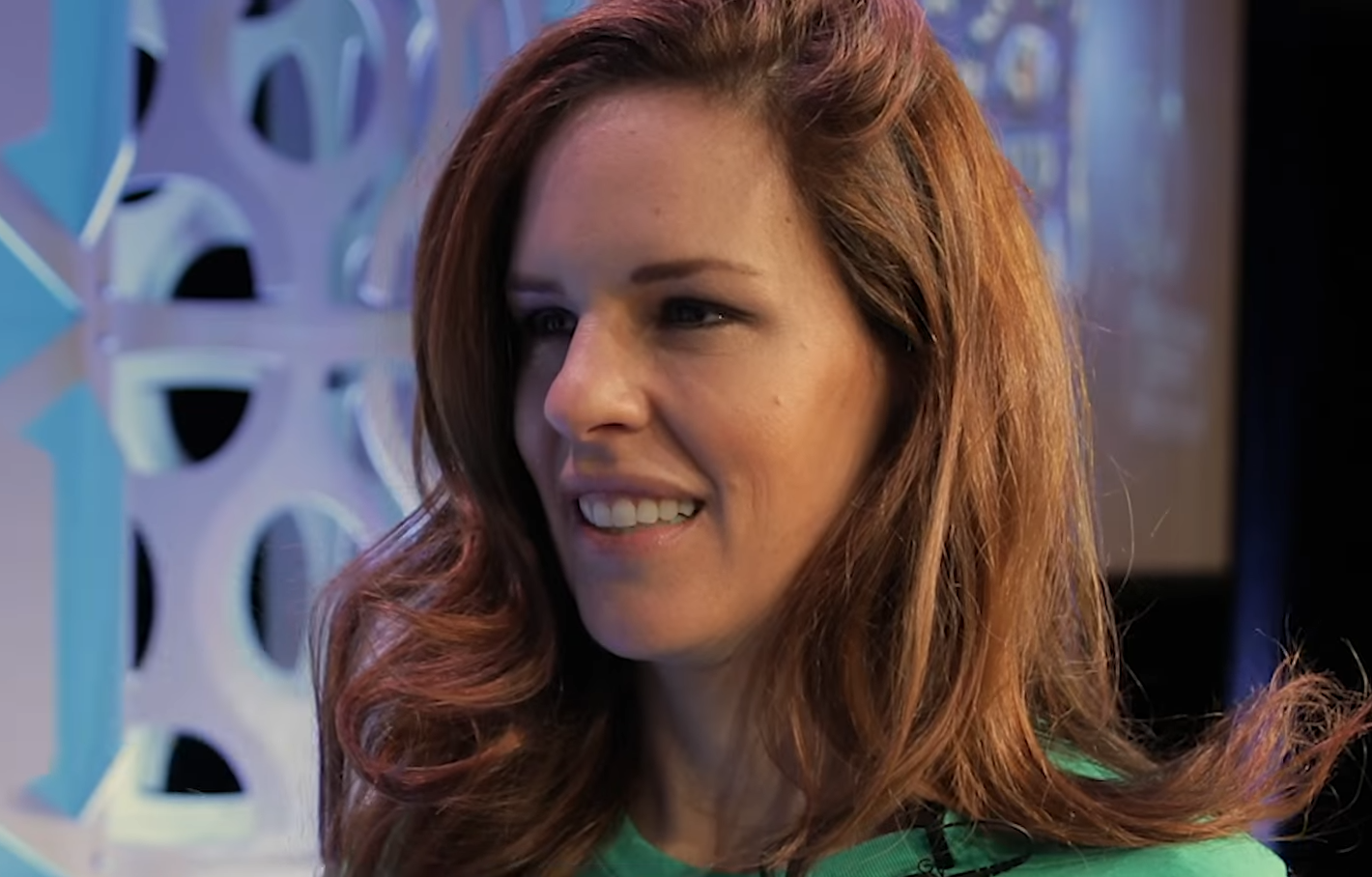
- Badan being interviewed on Front Office Sports's Shot Callers
- Born: November 6, 1975 (age 50)
- Education: Colby College
- Occupations: Businessperson, CEO of Food52
- Children: 2

Erika Ayers Badan (formerly Nardini; born November 6, 1975) is an American businesswoman and CEO of Food52. She was the CEO of Barstool Sports from 2016 to 2024.

== Early life and education ==
Badan spent much of her childhood in New Hampshire and Vermont. She received a bachelor's degree in sociology from Colby College in Maine.

== Career ==
Badan worked in marketing at Demand Media, Yahoo! and Microsoft. From 2013 to 2014, she was the chief marketing officer of AOL. Ayers was then the president and chief revenue officer of New York-based start up Bkstg.

In 2016, Badan became the CEO of Barstool Sports. Badan oversaw the company's expansion into multimedia, merchandising, streaming and pay-per-view programming.

The valuation of Barstool Sports increased from $15 million to $100 million in 2018. In 2018, Forbes ranked her 25th on its "Most Powerful Women In U.S. Sports". In 2019, she was included on Crain's New York's "Notable Women in the Business of Sports".

Badan resigned as CEO of Barstool on January 16, 2024. In April 2024, Badan was named CEO of the Food52 website. Dave Portnoy took over as CEO of Barstool after she left.

She serves on the boards of global public safety technology leader AXON Enterprise, The Premier Lacrosse League, and VICE. She was formerly on the board of directors for WWE and Torchy's Tacos.
