= Two for the Money (2005 film) =

2005 film

- Theatrical release poster
- Directed by: D.J. Caruso
- Written by: Dan Gilroy
- Produced by: James G. Robinson
- Starring: Al Pacino; Matthew McConaughey; Rene Russo; Armand Assante; Jeremy Piven
- Cinematography: Conrad W. Hall
- Edited by: Glen Scantlebury
- Music by: Christophe Beck
- Production company: Morgan Creek Productions
- Distributed by: Universal Pictures
- Release date: October 7, 2005
- Running time: 122 minutes
- Country: United States
- Language: English
- Budget: $20-35 million
- Box office: $30.5 million

Two for the Money is a 2005 American sports drama film directed by D.J. Caruso and starring Al Pacino, Matthew McConaughey, Rene Russo, Armand Assante and Carly Pope. The film is about the world of sports gambling. It was released on October 7, 2005. It is the first Morgan Creek movie distributed by Universal Pictures since Coupe de Ville in 1990. It is loosely based upon an employee at Stu Feiner's handicapping business.

== Plot ==
Brandon Lang is a former college football star based in Las Vegas who, after sustaining a career-ending knee injury, takes a job handicapping football games to support his mother and younger brother. His success at selecting winners catches the attention of Walter Abrams, the head of one of the largest sports consulting operations in the United States. Walter offers him a job in New York, which Brandon accepts. With Lang’s extensive knowledge of the game, leagues, and players, he generates significant profits and attracts high-profile clients, quickly making a substantial amount of money.

Walter takes Brandon under his wing, and the two develop a close relationship, along with Walter’s wife, Toni. Walter transforms Brandon into a new persona, the slick John Anthony, whom he soon features on Abrams's cable television show, The Sports Advisors. This move upsets Jerry Sykes, Walter's in-house expert and best-seller, who now feels sidelined.

One evening, during a dinner with Walter and Toni, Brandon notices the attractive Alexandria at another table. Walter wagers that Brandon cannot convince her to go home with him. Brandon succeeds in his charm offensive, and the two spend the night together.

As Brandon becomes more involved with Walter and Toni, he learns that Walter is a recovering gambling addict and Toni is a former drug addict. As Brandon's success continues, he attracts the attention of wealthy gambler C.M. Novian, who agrees to place 20 million dollars in bets on Brandon’s picks. All of Novian's bets pay off, earning Walter's firm 2 million dollars.

When Brandon asks Walter for a larger share of the earnings, Walter denies his request, stating that he has not yet earned it. Even when Brandon does, Walter warns he will not give him anything without a fight. Disheartened, Brandon seeks out Alexandria again, only to discover that she is a prostitute whom Walter had paid to sleep with him.

From this point on, things begin to unravel. Lang starts relying on his intuition instead of his research, and after picking a string of losers for two weeks, he is physically assaulted by Novian and one of his associates for losing 30 million dollars. Brandon also learns that Walter has resumed gambling using his picks and is now deeply in debt. As a result, the once-strong bond between Abrams and Lang begins to deteriorate.

As weeks pass, Lang’s performance continues to decline, and Walter becomes increasingly erratic, firing Sykes and suspecting that Lang is having an affair with Toni. Toni urges Brandon to leave before Walter's self-destructive behavior causes further damage, but Lang insists on making one final prediction for the last game of the season to redeem himself. He makes his pick by nervously flipping a coin, and Walter intensifies the pressure by guaranteeing money back to clients if they lose.

While Walter and his staff anxiously watch the game, Lang leaves before it concludes and boards a flight out of New York City, leaving behind a farewell letter. At the final play of the game, Brandon’s pick proves correct. After the game, Walter confronts Toni about the alleged affair, but she assures him that nothing happened, and the two reconcile. The film ends with Brandon coaching a junior league football team.

== Cast ==
- Al Pacino as Walter Abrams
- Matthew McConaughey as Brandon Lang / John Anthony
- Rene Russo as Toni Abrams
- Armand Assante as C.M. Novian
- Carly Pope as Tammy
- Jeremy Piven as Jerry Sykes
- Jaime King as Alexandria
- Ralph Garman as Reggie
- Charles Carroll as Chuck Adler
- Ildiko Ferenczi as Friend
- Veena Sood as G.A. Hostess

== Reception ==
Two for the Money received generally negative reviews from critics. Rotten Tomatoes reports that 22% of critics give the film positive reviews, based on 109 reviews, with an average score of 5.1/10. Its consensus states: "Despite its sportsmanlike swagger, Two for the Money's aimless plot isn't worth betting on." On Metacritic, it scored 50 out of a 100, based on 29 critics, indicating "mixed or average" reviews. Audiences polled by CinemaScore gave the film an average grade of "B+" on an A+ to F scale.

Roger Ebert of the Chicago Sun-Times gave the film 3½ stars out of 4, while Nick Schager of Slant Magazine gave it 2 out of 4, saying in his opening comments, "Substitute The Devil's Advocate's satanic legal scheming with unethical sports gambling practices and you've got Two for the Money." Two for the Money also received 48% from Cinafilm, which based it on 507 reviews, as well as a C from Reeling Reviews.

The film's box-office gross receipts amounted to $23 million in the United States and a worldwide total of $30.5 million, against a production budget of $20-35 million.

== Home media ==
Two for the Money was released on DVD and VHS on January 17, 2006. It is the last film released by Morgan Creek Productions to receive a VHS release.

== See also ==
- List of American football films
