= T-Bob Hebert =

American football player (born 1989)

No. 53
- Positions: Center, offensive guard

Personal information
- Born: February 9, 1989 (age 37); Kenner, Louisiana, U.S.
- Listed height: 6 ft 3 in (1.91 m)
- Listed weight: 304 lb (138 kg)

Career information
- High school: Greater Atlanta Christian School
- College: LSU (2007–2011)

Awards and highlights
- 2008 SEC Academic Honor Roll

Bobby Joseph Hebert III (surname pronounced AY-bair /ˈeɪbɛər/; born February 9, 1989), better known as T-Bob Hebert, is an American media personality and former football offensive lineman for the LSU Tigers football team.

== Early life ==
T-Bob Hebert was born in Kenner, Louisiana, on February 9, 1989, to Bobby and Teresa Hebert. He grew up in Norcross, Georgia. His father, Bobby Hebert, known as the "Cajun Cannon," was a former National Football League quarterback and sports media personality who was inducted into the Louisiana Sports Hall of Fame and the New Orleans Saints Hall of Fame.

He played football at Greater Atlanta Christian High School in Norcross, Georgia.

== College career ==
=== Recruiting ===
On October 30, 2006, Hebert committed to LSU to play Offensive line for the Tigers football team. He signed his Letter of Intent on February 7, 2007. Hebert expressed that LSU was his dream school.

He was ranked as the second best center in the country by Rivals for the 2007 high school recruiting class.

=== Playing career ===
Hebert redshirted his freshman year at LSU in 2007 for the 2007 LSU Tigers football team.

In 2008, during Hebert's redshirt freshman season, he played six games for the 2008 LSU Tigers football team, but did not have any starts. He sustained a season ending injury during LSU's game against South Carolina. He made the 2008 SEC Academic Honor Roll.

In 2009, during Hebert's sophomore season, he started eleven games for the 2009 LSU Tigers football team, while missing one regular season game against Louisiana Tech and missing the bowl game against Penn State.

In May 2010, LSU coach, Les Miles suspended Hebert indefinitely from the team for the start of his junior season, due to a DUI arrest. Despite the earlier suspension, in 2010, during Hebert's junior season for the 2010 LSU Tigers football team, he played in all thirteen games while playing at both right guard and center.

In 2011, during Hebert's senior season, he played in twelve games for the 2011 LSU Tigers football team, with eight of them being starts.

=== NFL ===
He signed a free agent contract with the St. Louis Rams in 2012, but never played a game in the NFL.

== Media career ==
Following the end of his college football career and having failed to make an NFL team as a free agent, Hebert began a media career with ESPN 1350 WWWL in New Orleans and then later at ESPN 104.5 in Baton Rouge. At the network, he hosted the show, "Off the Bench" with his former LSU teammate Jacob Hester. In February 2025, he became the co-host of the "Jim Rome After Hour" on The Jim Rome Show along with the main host, Jim Rome. He was also the host of YouTube show, Snaps, along with former University of Georgia quarterback, Aaron Murray.

In 2022, "Off the Bench" was rated as the Best Sports Talk Show by the Louisiana Association of Broadcasters in 2022. Barrett Sports Media recognized the show as a Top 20 mid-market morning show from 2019 to 2024. In 2024, the Louisiana Association of Broadcasters (LAB) named him the Young Professional of the Year.

On May 16, 2025, he left his previous endeavors to take a job at Barstool Sports in their Chicago office. He was replaced at ESPN by former New Orleans Saints quarterback, Matt Flynn. Before his departure, Hebert released an "Ode to Louisiana" to express his gratitude for his 18 years in the state. At Barstool, he is the host of Unnecessary Roughness and Wake Up Barstool.

== Personal life ==
Hebert is married to Caitlyn Hebert and they have three children.
