= Charlie O'Connell =

American actor and television personality

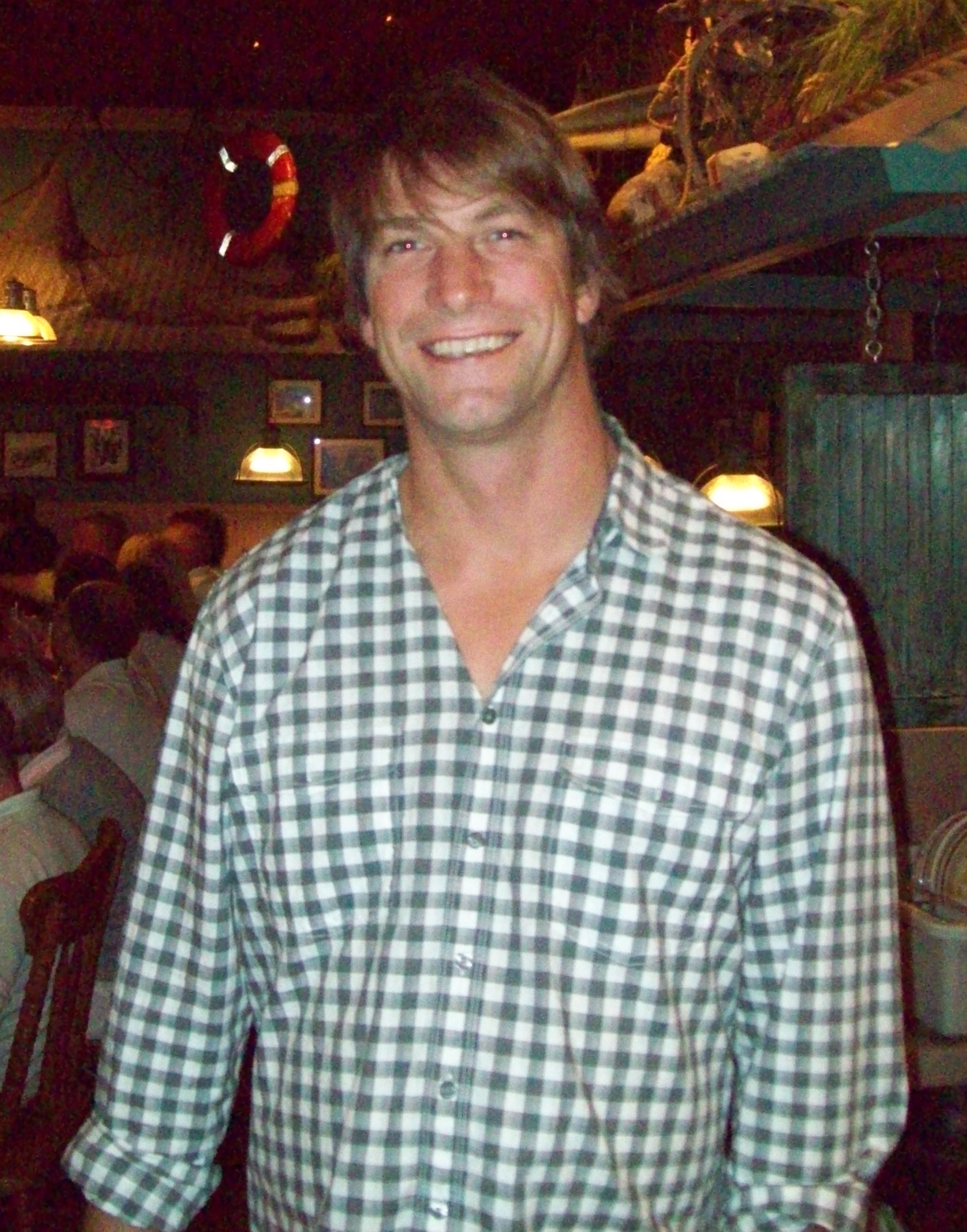
- O'Connell in Myrtle Beach, South Carolina in 2009
- Born: Charles Stanley O'Connell; April 21, 1975 (age 51); New York City, U.S.
- Occupations: Actor; television personality
- Years active: 1998–present
- Spouse: Anna Sophia Berglund (m. 2018)
- Relatives: Jerry O'Connell (brother); Charles Witkowski (grandfather)

Charles Stanley "Charlie" O'Connell (born April 21, 1975) is an American actor and reality television personality. He is known for his appearance on The Bachelor, as well as appearing in several projects involving his older brother Jerry O'Connell, including a starring role as Colin Mallory in Season 4 of the science fiction television series Sliders.

== Life and career ==
O'Connell was born in New York City, New York, the son of Linda (née Witkowski), an art teacher, and Michael O'Connell, an advertising agency art director. His maternal grandfather, Charles S. Witkowski, was the mayor of Jersey City, New Jersey O'Connell is of half Irish, one quarter Italian, and one quarter Polish ancestry. O'Connell appeared in small roles in such films as Dude, Where's My Car? and The New Guy, the latter of which also paired him with his brother Jerry. He obtained greater notoriety when he appeared with his brother in Sliders and then on the seventh season of the reality television series The Bachelor between March 2005 and May 2005. In two episodes of Crossing Jordan, entitled "Sunset Division" (season 2) and "Skin and Bone" (season 4), he played the onscreen brother of his brother's character, Detective Woody Hoyt.

== Filmography ==
=== Television ===
- V.I.P. (1998) - Jimmie ("Val Got Game")
- Zoe, Duncan, Jack and Jane (1999) - Johnny Gottlieb ("When Zoe Met Johnny")
- Sliders (1996–1999) - Kit Richards / Officer O'Hara / Colin Mallory
- Wasteland (1999) - Bartender ("Best Laid Plans")
- Without a Trace (2004) - Lawyer ("Hawks and Handsaws")
- Crossing Jordan (2003–2005) - Calvin ("Skin and Bone" and "Sunset Division")
- The Bachelor (2005) - himself (Season 7)
- Love, Inc. (2006) - Eric ("Fired Up")
- Bar Karma (2011) - Steve ("Fair Catch")
- Femme Fatales (2011) - Jay Roma ("Girls Gone Dead", "Visions, Part 1" and "Visions, Part 2")
- Reed Between the Lines (2011) - Corey ("Let's Talk About Scared Money")
- The Haunted Hathaways (2014) - Wrong Viking ("Haunted Viking")

=== Film ===
- Cruel Intentions (1999) - Court Reynolds
- The Magicians (2000) - Michael DeVane (TV Movie)
- Dude, Where's My Car? (2000) - Tommy
- Devil's Prey (2001) - David
- The New Guy (2002) - Charlie
- Kiss the Bride (2002) - Joey
- Kraken: Tentacles of the Deep (2006) - Ray (TV Movie)
- 2-Headed Shark Attack (2012) - Professor Franklin Babish
- Mischief Night (2013) - Will
- Unlucky Charms (2013) - Baxter Randolph
- Huff (2013) - Huff
- Sex, Marriage and Infidelity (2015) - Oliver
- A Curry on an American Plate (2017) - Bob
- Staged Killer (2019) - Robert

Preceded by Byron Velvick	The Bachelor; Season 7	Succeeded by Travis Lane Stork
