= Barstool Sports =

American sports media company

Barstool Sports, Inc.
- Website type: Blog
- Founded: September 2003; 23 years ago Milton, Massachusetts
- Headquarters: Chicago, Illinois
- Country of origin: United States
- Owner: Dave Portnoy
- Founder: Dave Portnoy
- Website: barstoolsports.com

Barstool Sports, Inc. is an American blog and digital media company founded in 2003 by businessman and social media personality Dave Portnoy, which grew from a free Boston-area print sports paper into a nationally recognized brand centered on sports journalism, pop culture, and personality-driven content. It became especially influential through its podcasts (such as Pardon My Take), social media presence, and loyal fanbase of 'Stoolies,' while also expanding into merchandise, live events, food and beverage brands, and sports betting partnerships. Barstool Sports also owns and operates a sports blog, Old Row, and an amateur boxing contest, Rough N Rowdy.

Over the years, Barstool has attracted major investments (notably from the Chernin Group and Penn Entertainment), reached valuations in the hundreds of millions, and secured high-profile media deals with companies like Fox Sports and Netflix.

== History ==
=== Launch and growth (2003–2016) ===
Barstool began in 2003 as a weekly print publication distributed for free at transit stops in the Boston metropolitan area that offered gambling advertisements and fantasy sports projections but later expanded to encompass other topics. It launched on the Internet in 2007. The site was headquartered in Milton, Massachusetts, identifiable with a cardboard sign with the site's name written in ballpoint pen.

Portnoy hired Kevin Clancy in 2009 and launched Barstool New York, the blog's first major move outside the Boston area. Barstool ceased publication of the print version in 2010 and transitioned to a web-only model.

In 2016, Erika Ayers Badan took over as the CEO. At the time of her being CEO, Barstool only had about four sponsors, the majority being companies of beer brands or that were only rooted in Boston. Badan credits the loyal and energetic fanbase for keeping the Digital Media company afloat during their times of mishaps. Additionally, there were also many other aspects that Badan credits towards Barstool's growth. When Twitter bought the streaming service Periscope and Facebook introduced it's live streaming asset, Barstool was able to go live and entertain their audiences on both platforms which brought in overwhelming support to their channels. "The talent was electric. People were wanting to watch them," Badan stated when asked about the loyal live audience Barstool was able to sustain. When Badan took over as CEO in 2016, she set herself a goal of generating $25 million in revenue within a five year plan, Barstool quickly hit that mark in just year two.

=== Early controversies ===
In August 2011, the site received criticism over nude photos of American football quarterback Tom Brady's two-year-old son, which was accompanied by comments saying the child had a "howitzer", which a former prosecutor suggested was sexualization of a minor. Portnoy argued that the comments were meant to be humorous in tone and were not intended to be seen as sexual.

The satirical nature of the site means that some comments have sparked debate, including a post on a 2010 blog in which Portnoy said, "Even though I never condone rape if you're a size 6 and you're wearing skinny jeans you kind of deserve to be raped right?"

Other elements that have received criticism as college humor gone too far include comments such as "we don't condone rape of any kind at our Blackout Parties ... however if a chick passes out that's a gray area". Portnoy, in response, has stated that, "...It's not our intent, with jokes, to poke fun at rape victims," while pointing out the satirical nature of the site's content. A Northeastern University protest group called Knockout Barstool held a demonstration outside of a 2012 Blackout party at Boston's House of Blues. Portnoy has been openly dismissive of the protest group, referring to them as "serial protesters", "nutbags" and "crazy bitches".

=== Further expansion ===
By 2013, Barstool Sports had expanded to five cities, including Philadelphia and Chicago, with a university-focused BarstoolU brand. Each franchise had its own editorial staff and voice and operated autonomously from the main Barstool Sports blog. The blogger team published around 70 to 80 posts each weekday. According to Entrepreneur.com in December 2013, more than four million unique users visited Barstool monthly, with over 80 million page views.

==== Barstool Blackout Tour ====
In 2011 and 2012, the BarstoolU brand ran the "Barstool Blackout Tour," a series of electronic dance parties with as many as 2,500 attendees at venues in cities and college towns on the East Coast and in the Midwest. The parties were criticized for promoting excessive drinking and allowing underage drinking, as well as four assaults that have happened at the proceedings. In February 2012, Boston mayor Thomas M. Menino expressed concern through a spokesperson over the parties' promotion of "excessive drinking to the point of blacking out" and that such promotion would not be a good message for the city. Massachusetts Alcoholic Beverage Control Commission agents and club security at a House of Blues event in Boston the following month confiscated 300 fake identifications and refused admission for around three-fourths of the event's 2000 ticket holders. Shortly thereafter Portnoy announced that the company would not be scheduling more of the events in Boston, stating that "it just doesn't seem like Boston is friendly to nightlife of our sort, at least".

=== The Chernin Group investment (2016–2020) ===
By 2016, Barstool claimed to pull in 250 million views per month. On January 7, 2016, private equity firm The Chernin Group (TCG) purchased a 51% majority stake in Barstool Sports, valuing the company at between $10 and $15 million. According to Chernin Group president of digital Mike Kerns, Kerns was put in contact with Portnoy via mutual friend and former University of Kentucky quarterback Jared Lorenzen. After an initial phone call, Kerns flew to Boston to have dinner with Portnoy, discuss the Barstool vision, and begin preliminary investment talks.

Following the TCG investment, the company moved its headquarters from Boston to New York City. Portnoy continued to run the site and retained complete creative control as Chief of Content. On July 19, 2016, Erika Nardini, former chief marketing officer of AOL, was announced as the CEO of Barstool Sports. In 2020, Chernin relinquished control of Barstool as part of the Penn National Gaming partnership. Also in 2016, Barstool bought Old Row Sports, another sports blog, for an estimated $10 to US$15 million.

During the week of Super Bowl LI, Barstool broadcast a televised version of The Barstool Rundown live from Houston on Comedy Central. The show made headlines on February 2, 2017, after Indianapolis Colts punter Pat McAfee announced during a segment of that night's episode that he was retiring from the NFL to become a contributor to the site. On June 19, 2017, the site announced that Michael Rapaport would be joining Barstool Sports and hosting a podcast. Rapaport and Barstool quickly ended their relationship in a public feud involving Kevin Durant.

On October 18, Barstool Van Talk debuted on ESPN2. The show starred Pardon My Take personalities PFT Commenter and Dan "Big Cat" Katz. It was canceled after one episode, with ESPN Inc. president John Skipper citing concerns about distinguishing the content of Barstool from that of ESPN. The show's removal came after past statements from Barstool president Dave Portnoy resurfaced, one of which involved calling current ESPN employee Sam Ponder a "slut".

Following a fundraising round reported in January, Barstool is said to have received a valuation of $100 million. CEO Erika Nardini said The Chernin Group has invested $25 million in the website. On February 18, Michael Rapaport was fired after making a derogatory comment towards the site's fan-base.

On March 28, 2018, NBA player Frank Kaminsky launched a Barstool podcast, Pros and Joes, hosted by himself and three high-school friends. In September 2018, Barstool premiered the Sunday-morning program The Barstool Sports Advisors on TVG Network, which featured Portnoy, Dan Katz, PFT Commenter, and Stu Feiner; the first half-hour of the program was also simulcast by Barstool's digital properties.

=== Penn National Gaming investment and purchase (2020–2023) ===
According to Vox, Barstool generated between $90 and $100 million in revenue in 2019, with the majority from podcasts, merchandise sales, and gambling deals. On January 29, 2020, casino company Penn National Gaming purchased a 36% stake in Barstool Sports for $135 million in cash and $28 million in preferred stock, valuing Barstool at $450 million. Penn National would have the option to pay an additional $62 million in 3 years to increase its stake to 50%. Penn's investment was seen as part of a growing trend of gambling and media companies to partner to capitalize on the anticipated boom in online gambling after the U.S. Supreme Court allowed sports betting in Murphy v. National Collegiate Athletic Association. Following the sale, The Chernin Group maintained a 36% stake in the company.

The company subsequently launched Barstool Sportsbook, a mobile application for sports betting, in Pennsylvania on September 18, 2020. During its first week of operation, it handled $11 million in wagers. In January 2021, the company announced that the Sportsbook would expand to Michigan. Penn National announced that they would be matching all first-time deposits by donating to the Barstool Fund, raising a total of $4,550,280 for Michigan small businesses.

On July 27, 2021, Barstool Sports became the new title sponsor of the Arizona Bowl and would have exclusive international broadcast rights. The 2021 edition of the game was canceled due to the COVID-19 pandemic, but the game was played in 2022.

Barstool experienced a wave of criticism from its audience in August 2021, when employee Matthew "Chaps" Cothron used the company's platform to announce he had placed his young daughter on controversial puberty blocking medication

In February 2023, Penn exercised its option to pay $388 million and become the sole owner of Barstool.

=== Repurchase by Dave Portnoy (2023) ===
On August 8, 2023, Dave Portnoy announced that Penn Entertainment had ended its relationship with Barstool Sports and had divested ownership of the company back to him. After becoming an investor in 2020, Penn Gaming eventually acquired a majority stake in 2023. Penn had announced a $2 billion agreement with ESPN to rebrand Barstool Sportsbook as ESPN Bet, and the sale was intended to relieve Penn of "non-compete and other restrictive covenants" tied to its ownership of Barstool. Portnoy stated, "The regulated industry is probably not the best place for Barstool Sports and the type of content we make". The agreement stipulates that Penn will receive 50% of the gross proceeds of any future sale of Barstool, but Portnoy stated that he planned to maintain his ownership of the site "till I die".

On February 11, 2024, Barstool Sports and DraftKings finalized a multi-year sports betting media partnership after the Super Bowl and the termination of Barstool's non-compete with Penn. This deal kicked off with a live-streamed free-throw challenge event featuring Barstool talent, where viewers could win part of a $100,000 prize pool. In January 2024, Barstool Sports announced that they are partnering with Rumble.

Some of Barstool's contributors played a role in spreading false claims about Mary Kate Cornett, a 19-year-old student at the University of Mississippi who was the subject of fake rumors that she slept with her boyfriend's father. While Pat McAfee of ESPN was the primary figure behind spreading the rumors, Barstool's personalities including long time blogger Kevin Clancy also perpetrated the rumors, and Portnoy would later comment that he regrets the role that his company would play in spreading "vicious" rumors. Barstool and Cornett's lawyers are planning to head to mediation.

In July 2025, Fox Sports announced a "wide-ranging" content partnership with Barstool, under which it will produce a new studio show for its Fox Sports 1 cable channel, work with Fox on co-producing digital content, and have Portnoy join the panel of its college football pre-game show Big Noon Kickoff (with other Barstool personalities also appearing as contributors). The FS1 show, Wake Up Barstool, debuted on September 2, 2025. The "Barstool College Football Show" currently airs on select Saturdays, streaming on the Barstool's website, FOX one, Tubi, and all social media channels. The hosts of the show are Dave Portnoy, Kayce Smith, Brandon Walker, and Big Cat.

In October of 2026, Portnoy and Barstool were removed from appearing on Fox's "Big Noon Kickoff" after reports circulated the two parties could not balance between Barstool's edgy personality with Fox's more traditional football coverage. "Juice wasn't worth the squeeze and frankly I don't blame them. Huge dollars at stake and you have Cryin Ryan throwing temper tantrums and making threats every few days on something I said," Portnoy stated in a post. Fox was reluctant to speak on the topic when asked for a statement on the decision.

In October and November 2025, Barstool premiered the Internet Invitational, a six-episode YouTube golf event for golf influencers, which garnered widespread acclaim and achieved over 25 million views.

In December 2025, Dave Portnoy announced that Barstool signed a deal with Netflix to exclusively show three of Barstool's bigger video podcasts on the platform, in a purported 8-figure deal. Those podcasts include: Pardon My Take, Spittin' Chiclets, and the Ryen Russillo Show. The podcasts are set to launch on Netflix in early 2026. The lucrative deal includes new shows and exclusive library selections that will continue to expand for the foreseeable future; audio versions will remain as how they are. With Netflix making a big splash in the podcasting world, this gives Barstool an even bigger opportunity to connect with fans all around the world, showcasing their bright personalities and showing their best takes. "We're excited to partner with Netflix and hopefully bring new audiences to each platform," said Dave Portnoy.

== Content and audience ==
Barstool was described as the "Bible of Bro Culture" and a must-read for the "dude zeitgeist" for its committed audience of young men, primarily in the 18–35 age demographic, who felt disenfranchised by the mainstream media. Portnoy described the site's topics in 2011 as "sports/smut". The site contains a mixture of podcasts, blogs, and video series featuring company staff in what has been described as "a sort of online reality show: Every office argument and personal-life development was written up and fed to a growing legion of 'Stoolies'." The site is popular among professional athletes as well. Logan Couture claimed that a quarter of players in the NHL read Barstool.

According to The Daily Beast, Barstool has a culture of reposting content from independent content creators without attribution. In March 2019, Barstool was accused by comedian Miel Bredouw of having reposted one of her videos to the site's Twitter account without attribution. After Bredouw eventually refused to rescind her complaint in exchange for $2,000, Barstool filed a counter-claim asking Twitter to reinstate the video, alleging that the take-down was an error. Following the dispute, data from Social Blade revealed that on March 6, 2019, Barstool deleted over 60,000 posts from its Twitter account and 1,000 posts from its Instagram account.

=== Brands ===
Barstool owns Old Row, a sports blog it bought in 2016, and the company also operates Rough N Rowdy, an amateur boxing contest. Barstool also owns several food and beverage brands including Pink Whitney, Pardon My Cheesesteak, and Stella Blue Coffee, as well as several failed food and beverage brands that it no longer (or barely) operates such as Pirate Water and Big Deal Brewing.

In addition to the many companies Barstool has collaborated with, in May of 2020, Barstool Sports and GALLO's High Noon Seltzer officially announced a media partnership. During this time, the High Noon brand was just starting to take off after receiving immense support from their consumers. This allowed them to expand and introduce new flavors in their variety packs. The partnership included branded events and promotions, Dave Portnoy personally promoting the hard seltzer, and High Noon being a major sponsor of Barstool Summer Games. High Noon is also seen and advertised on many of Barstool's shows. Portnoy on the partnership stated, "What initially caught my eye was the can, and when I tasted it, I knew I wanted to partner with High Noon. It's so refreshing, and I love that it's made with real vodka. I'm excited to get behind the brand and share High Noons with our fans." Britt West, the Vice President and General Manager of GALLO at the time, was also very ecstatic on the collaboration giving the Barstool brand high praise on their media content. West stated "The media partnership is a natural fit for both brands, we both know REAL. High Noon is clearly differentiated by being the top selling spirits based Hard Seltzer made with Real Vodka and Real Juice, while Barstool is the leader in genuine engaging content." High Noon is currently the #1 selling spirits based hard seltzer, they are continuing to grow and release new flavors as of today.

=== College social media accounts ===
Barstool operates various social media accounts, mostly known on Instagram, appointing students at colleges to run their respective accounts. The company further operates "Chicks" accounts, which are targeted towards a more feminine audience in contrast to how Barstool itself is male-targeted. Both Barstool and Chicks pages repost campus submissions, such as ones where students are encouraged to submit screenshots of chats from dating apps such as Tinder, Hinge, Bumble.

=== Radio ===
In January 2017, the company premiered Barstool Radio, a daily two-hour show on SiriusXM. The partnership expanded to a 24-hour channel in January 2018, which aired until January 2021. Barstool returned to radio in February 2021 with a daily sports betting-themed show called Barstool Sports: Picks Central, distributed by Westwood One.

=== Podcasts ===
Barstool produces numerous podcasts, including programming from Dave Portnoy, Spittin' Chiclets, Pardon My Take, A New Untold Story, Son of a Boy Dad, The Yak, and Chicks in the Office, as well as podcasts from Barstool bloggers, professional athletes, and celebrities such as Jon Gruden, Ryan Whitney, Paul Bissonnette, Arian Foster, and Mark Titus.

In 2018, Barstool acquired the Call Her Daddy podcast, along with hiring its co-hosts, Alex Cooper and Sofia Franklyn, which Cooper then took to Spotify in 2020.

=== Rough N Rowdy ===
In November 2017, Barstool purchased the Rough N' Rowdy Brawl, an amateur boxing competition held in West Virginia, to expand into live boxing events and pay-per-view. After the acquisition, Barstool created a new division called Barstool Brawl to put on as many as 12 events per year. By the competition's second iteration after the Barstool acquisition in February 2018, it drew 41,000 buys.

=== Over-the-top media ===
Barstool offers streaming and Video on Demand content, which is available on Roku, Amazon Fire TV, Apple TV, and Android TV. In 2021, SLING TV announced an exclusive channel for Barstool Sports. The Brandon Walker College Football Show featuring Brandon Walker was a live call-in show that was part of the Sling TV Barstool channel.

== Bars ==
As of 2025, Barstool has three brick-and-mortar bars in Philadelphia ("Barstool Sansom"); Scottsdale, Arizona; and Nashville, Tennessee. The company previously had a bar in Chicago ("Barstool River North"), but it closed in January 2026.

In May 2025, there was an incident at the Barstool Sansom bar in which a customer named Mohammed Adnan Khan purchased bottle service at the bar and requested a sign stating "Fuck the Jews." Khan then posted the video on Instagram and garnered the attention of Dave Portnoy. He was initially apologetic and agreed to educate himself on The Holocaust by going to Auschwitz concentration camp in Poland, but then reversed his stance and started a GiveSendGo campaign. He further entrenched himself in his stance by going on The Stew Peters Show, a white nationalist internet show. He was also suspended by Temple University and was reported to have lost an internship; a second student was also suspended from Temple stemming from the incident.

== Personalities ==
Portnoy is an active blogger on the site under his self-appointed "El Presidente" character. He is also known as "The Mogul" and "Davey Pageviews". Barstool has both employed already famous personalities, notably former athletes, and developed nationally known personalities like Call Her Daddy podcast host Alex Cooper and The Pat McAfee Show podcast host Pat McAfee

Notable current employees include:

- Jon Gruden, former NFL head coach, Super Bowl champion, analyst on Barstool's The Pro Football Football Show
- Stu Feiner, sports handicapper, analyst on Barstool Sports Advisors
- Dan "Big Cat" Katz, co-host of Barstool's Pardon My Take podcast
- PFT Commenter, co-host of Barstool's Pardon My Take podcast
- Arian Foster, former All-Pro NFL running back, co-host of Barstool's Macrodosing podcast
- Paul Bissonnette, former NHL winger, analyst on NHL on TNT, co-host of Barstool's Spittin' Chiclets podcast
- Ryan Whitney, former NHL defenceman, analyst on NHL Network, and co-host of Barstool's Spittin' Chiclets podcast
- Mark Titus, college basketball podcaster formerly of ESPN, The Ringer, and FOX Sports, co-host of Barstool's Mostly Sports podcast
- Kirk Minihane, former radio host of Kirk and Callahan, host of Barstool's The Kirk Minihane Show podcast
- Jason Williams, NBA champion former point guard, analyst on Wake Up Barstool
- T-Bob Hebert, host of Wake Up Barstool
- Ryen Russillo, radio host and podcaster formerly of ESPN and The Ringer, host of Barstool's The Ryen Russillo Show podcast
- Gillie da Kid, co-host of Million Dollaz Worth of Game

Notable former employees include:

- Pat McAfee, former NFL player and sportscaster (2016–2018)
- Alex Cooper, podcaster (2018–2020)
- Kat Timpf, political commentator (2016)
- Jenna Marbles, social media personality (2010–2011)
- Asa Akira, adult film actress (2017)
- Michael Rapaport, actor and comedian (2017–2018)
- Caleb Pressley, comedian and internet personality (2015–2025)
- Alex Rodriguez, former MLB player and sportscaster (2018–2020)
- Deion Sanders, former NFL and MLB player and current college football coach (2020–2022)
- Will Compton, former NFL linebacker (2020–2025)
- Taylor Lewan, former All-Pro NFL offensive tackle (2020–2025)

Several other figures have had stints with Barstool.

== Charitable work ==
Police
Veterans
Other

Date	Beneficiary	Donations from Merchandise Sales	Donation from Portnoy	Other	Total Donated	References
November 2012 (Veterans Day)	Purchase wheelchair for U.S. Army medic who had lost limbs in Afghanistan	$15,000			$15,000	
2013	Victims of the Boston Marathon bombing	$240,000			$240,000	
April 2017	Justin J. Watt Foundation			$55,000 from Pardon My Take listeners, $10,000 from Pat McAfee	$65,000	
July 2018	Family of Weymouth, Massachusetts police officer Michael Chesna	$149,461			$149,461	
November 2019 (Veterans Day)	Veterans with mental health needs	$91,000	$91,000		$182,000	
October 2022	Family of Bristol police officers Dustin DeMonte and Alex Hamzy	~$100,000			~$100,000	
February 2024	LifeLine Animal Project	$277,000			$277,000	
March 2024	Family of NYPD officer Jonathan Diller	$750,000	$750,000		$1,500,000	
April 2024	Family of Onondaga County Sheriff Lt. Michael Hoosock	$200,000	$300,000	$100,000 from Dana White	$600,000	
December 2025	Family of Delaware trooper Cpl. Matthew “Ty” Snook	~$250,000	~$250,000		~$500,000	

The company partnered with NFL quarterback Baker Mayfield in 2018 to release a clothing line benefiting Special Olympics Ohio.

Due to Portnoy's consistent and longstanding support for first responders, Barstool's work on behalf of fallen police officers has received an overwhelmingly positive response from Barstool's audience and the law enforcement community. This was especially true of his work for Officer Jonathan Diller's widow, Stephanie. In addition to the $1.5 million raised for Diller's family, Portnoy was invited to attend the annual NYPD gala as the guest of honor. However, one notable exception occurred when longtime employee Kevin Clancy weighed in on Diller's murder. Though he encouraged support for the company's efforts, Clancy received significant backlash from Barstool's largely pro-police audience over his past support for the BLM/Defund the Police movement.

The company launched "The Barstool Difference," a philanthropy arm pegged to its Barstool Fund in March 2022. The initiative consisted of four parts: one for women-run businesses, one for veteran-run businesses, one for youth service, and one for sobriety. Tonya Dressel of Microsoft's philanthropy effort, was hired to lead the initiative.

=== Barstool Fund ===
In response to the COVID-19 pandemic and related government restrictions, Barstool launched The Barstool Fund, a non-profit that provides financial support to small businesses affected by the pandemic. The fund raised $41 million, supporting at least 167 small businesses. On top of an initial $500,000 donation from Portnoy, celebrities such as Tom Brady, Guy Fieri, Kid Rock, Aaron Rodgers and Elon Musk donated to the fund.

=== Support for Rescue Animals ===
Barstool has several endeavors to benefit rescue animals, including through Miss Peaches, a rescue pitbull owned by Dave Portnoy, and through Stella Blue Coffee, a company jointly owned with the Pardon My Take host, Dan "Big Cat" Katz. Dave Portnoy's dog, Miss Peaches, gained much publicity after he adopted the pitbull on February 14, 2024, enabling Portnoy to raise over $1 Million Dollars for various animal shelters. Stella Blue Coffee has raised over $200,000.00 for the PAWS Chicago animal shelter. Dan Katz's dog, Stella, the namesake of the company, was adopted from the PAWS Chicago animal shelter.

== Labor relations ==
In August 2019, Barstool owner Dave Portnoy posted a series of tweets in which he threatened to fire "on the spot" any Barstool employee who contacted a reporter to talk about unionization, as well as reposting a 2015 article in which he threatened to "smash their little union to smithereens" if Barstool employees attempted to unionize. In response, the IWW Freelance Journalists Union filed a complaint with the National Labor Relations Board (NLRB) against Barstool, alleging that Portnoy had violated federal labor law by threatening retaliation against Barstool employees if they attempted to unionize. In January 2020, Barstool reached an informal settlement with the NLRB in which Portnoy agreed to delete the tweets in question, and which required Barstool to notify employees of their right to unionize. In addition, as part of the settlement Barstool agreed to delete a Twitter account the company had created called "Barstool Sports Union" which had solicited DMs from employees in an apparent attempt to identify union supporters within the company.
