= PFT Commenter =

American sportswriter and podcaster

Colonel PFT Commenter
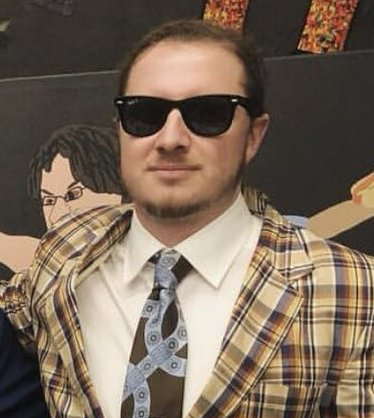
- PFT Commenter in 2019
- Born: Eric Sollenberger; January 31, 1985 (age 41); Herndon, Virginia, U.S.
- Other name: Wayne Tables
- Education: James Madison University
- Occupations: Sportswriter, podcaster
- Years active: 2015–present
- Website: barstoolsports.com

Eric Sollenberger (born January 31, 1985), better known as PFT Commenter is an American sports media personality and podcaster. PFT Commenter, whose name references Profootballtalk.com, is the co-host of the Barstool Sports podcast Pardon My Take, along with Dan "Big Cat" Katz. He also hosts the podcast, Macrodosing, with former NFL player Arian Foster. He is also the co-host of the Thursday line-up of Wake Up Barstool.

== Persona and media appearances ==
Sollenberger began to use the PFT Commenter alias as a commenter on ProFootballTalk.com before starting the @PFTCommenter Twitter account in 2012, and eventually becoming a contributor for SBNation, Kissing Suzy Kolber, and Football Savages.

In September 2015, PFT Commenter made an appearance on Mike Florio's PFT Live radio program. Also in 2015, PFT Commenter began commenting on the 2016 United States presidential election and appeared on camera several times, albeit in the background, during the television coverage of the Republican Party presidential debates. PFT Commenter also asked then-presidential candidate Ben Carson if he would travel back in time to abort an unborn Adolf Hitler, an exchange covered by the national media, leading to an article headlined "Ben Carson would not abort Baby Hitler" appearing on CNN.com.

PFT Commenter moved to Barstool Sports in March 2016 and started the podcast Pardon My Take along with co-host Dan Katz. The podcast, which is often satirical in nature, has grown to a top ranking on iTunes' "Sports and Recreation" list. In May 2016, PFT Commenter accompanied three other co-workers on a so-called "Grit Week," starting in Buffalo and ending in Indianapolis for the Indianapolis 500. He and Katz also made an appearance on SportsCenter with Scott Van Pelt on February 8, 2017.

Despite the National Football League removing press credentials for Barstool Sports, PFT Commenter snuck into "Opening Night" for Super Bowl LI in Houston and was able to ask questions to players and coaches.

PFT Commenter makes regular call-in appearances on Bomani Jones' ESPN radio show, The Right Time.

In January 2020, in advance of the XFL's 2020 revival season, PFT Commenter tried-out as a placekicker for the XFL's DC Defenders, after being trained by Jeff Fisher and Morten Andersen, in response to former NFL wide receiver Chad Johnson announcing that he was trying out for the XFL as a kicker (before quickly cancelling). During his tryout, PFT Commenter's signature sunglasses were replaced with tinted goggles and his helmet bore a single bar face mask, which has long been disallowed for use in professional and college football. He was ultimately not selected by the Defenders; instead, Tyler Rausa, who was at the same tryout, won the kicking position. On the November 18, 2023, edition of College GameDay, PFT Commenter was the celebrity guest picker for his alma mater, James Madison University.

He participated in the inaugural Internet Invitational presented by Barstool. During the event he was involved in controversy when his partner Luke Kwon overslept his tee time and PFT was forced to play the first 4 holes of the scramble event by himself.

PFT is the lead Guitarist for Pup Punk, Barstool's house band, along with Adam Ferrone (Rone), Robbie Fox, Frankie Borrelli, Nick Hamilton, and Caroline Baniewicz.

== Identity ==
Despite his popularity, PFT did not originally publicly reveal his identity. He told Awful Announcing in 2017 that he wore sunglasses on camera to avoid identification and the staff at Barstool Sports referred to him as "PFT", as only half knew his real name. He later said that his identity had become an "open secret" and that it would be found out eventually.

== Publishing ==
As PFT Commenter, Sollenberger wrote the self-published e-book, Goodell vs. Obama: The Battle for the Future of the NFL, which imagines a dystopian future in which President Barack Obama attempts to turn the Dallas Cowboys into a soccer team in Kenya, and NFL commissioner Roger Goodell fights him in a boxing match to stop him. He also co-wrote Pardon My Book, along with Big Cat, which they published in 2026 through HarperCollins on the tenth anniversary of Pardon My Take.
