= Dan Katz (podcaster) =

American sportswriter and podcaster

Daniel Katz
- Born: January 30, 1985 (age 41); Newton, Massachusetts, U.S.
- Other name: Big Cat
- Education: University of Wisconsin (BA)
- Occupations: Sportswriter, podcaster
- Children: 3
- Website: barstoolsports.com

Daniel Katz (born January 30, 1985) is an American sports media personality, writer, and podcaster for Barstool Sports. Also known as Big Cat, he is the co-host of the podcasts Pardon My Take and The Yak. Katz began working at Barstool Sports in 2012.

== Early life and education ==
Daniel Katz was born in Newton, Massachusetts on January 30, 1985. He attended the University of Wisconsin–Madison. In 2007, shortly after his graduation, he moved to Chicago.

== Career ==
Katz began working at Barstool Sports in 2012. He is the head of Barstool's Chicago office, which opened in 2023, following a $20 million build-out.

In February 2016 he launched Pardon My Take with his co-host, PFT Commenter. He was communicating with PFT Commenter through Twitter until they teamed up to create Pardon My Take. The podcast, which is often satirical, was the most popular sports podcast based on online popularity and ratings/reviews from Spotify and Apple. The podcast releases behind-the-scenes and standalone vlogs on YouTube under the banner “PMTV,” a play on the abbreviate of Pardon My Take.

Katz hosts The Yak, a daily panel show on YouTube. with Barstool personalities Kyle "KB" Bauer, Nick Turani, Kate Mannion, Mark Titus, and Brandon Walker. Former hosts of the show include current and former Barstool personalities such as Jared Carrabis, Coley Mick, Caleb Pressley, Adam Ferrone (Rone), and Harry "Lil Sasquatch" Settel. He makes call-in appearances every Thursday on the Waddle and Silvy radio program on ESPN 1000, a popular Chicago sports radio show hosted by Tom Waddle, a former professional football player for the Chicago Bears, among other teams, and Marc "Silvy" Silverman. In the Athletic Chicago sports radio survey, Katz won the write-in vote for best regular guest by a substantial margin.

In December 2018, Katz began hosting "The Corp" podcast with Alex Rodriguez. The podcast featured guests including Kobe Bryant, Barbara Corcoran, Mike Francesa, and Michael Rubin.

In 2025, he became a co-host of the Tuesday line-up of Wake Up Barstool on Fox Sports 1. He has also contributed to Big Noon Kickoff broadcasts on FOX. As of January 2026, Katz additionally hosts or contributes to seasonal NFL YouTube shows Barstool Sports Advisors and The Pro Football Football Show, and he is an analyst for Barstool College Football Show live gameday broadcasts from college campuses. He has expressed interest in lessening his workload at Barstool over the next few years now that he has 3 kids that are growing up and he wants to spend more time with them.

=== Stella Blue Coffee ===
In November 2022, Katz launched a coffee brand with the owners of Barstool Sports. The company donates some of the proceeds from the sales of the coffee brand to the PAWS Chicago animal shelter, where Katz rescued his dog, Stella. He has donated over $200,000 to Paws Chicago.

== Honors ==
In 2017, The Big Lead ranked Katz and PFT Commenter as the number-one sports media talents under age 40.

In 2023, The Big Lead ranked Katz as the 26th most powerful person in sports media. Sports Illustrated ranked him as the third-most influential personality in sports media, along with PFT Commenter.

Chicago Magazine listed him as the 41st-most influential person in Chicago for 2024.

In 2026, Katz and co-podcaster Eric Sollenberger (PFT Commenter) wrote and released Pardon My Book: 10 Years of the Best (and Worst) In Sports from Pardon My Take. The book, and subsequently the authors, achieved New York Times Best Seller status on August 27th, 2026.

== Controversy ==
=== "Can't Lose Parlay" ===
Due to Katz's ''Can't Lose Parlay," the Massachusetts Gaming Commission fined Barstool Sports' previous owner, Penn Entertainment. Penn Entertainment argued that the "Can't Lose Parlay" was meant to be a "satirical reference to Katz’s history as a 'loser' and 'terrible, terrible gambler.'" They likened it to no one believing that Cap'n Crunch crunch berries are made of berries. Despite the argument that the promotion was satire and most Barstool bettors were in on the joke, Commissioner Brad Hill said that it was the regulatory body's duty to protect the 10% of the population who may not know the background of the promotion and might bet on the parlay because they see Katz doing so.

=== Barstool Van Talk ===
His ESPN show, Barstool Van Talk, was canceled after only one episode due to criticism from various female ESPN employees. ESPN president John Skipper issued a statement regarding its cancellation: "Effective immediately, I am cancelling Barstool Van Talk. While we had approval on the content of the show, I erred in assuming we could distance our efforts from the Barstool site and its content. Apart from this decision, we appreciate the efforts of Big Cat and PFT Commenter. They delivered the show they promised."

Katz was criticized for making lewd comments about Taylor Swift.

=== Massachusetts upbringing ===
In order to appeal more strongly to his Chicago sports audience, Katz originally downplayed his upbringing in Massachusetts throughout his career at Barstool Sports. His upbringing was publicly revealed by Kirk Minihane during an episode of the fourth season of Surviving Barstool. "Katz said he was born in Massachusetts just outside of Boston but had family in Highland Park, IL. His uncle was a Bulls season ticket holder and he accompanied his uncle to several Bulls games throughout the 1990s. He fell in love with the city and, when the former Barstool Chicago blogger no longer covered the area, Katz stepped in and covered the teams. Since then, he's lived and died with the teams and their fans."

Katz published an article on the Barstool Sports website, on January 15, 2025, to come clean on the controversy. He revealed that he moved to Chicago shortly after graduating from the University of Wisconsin, in 2007. In 2012, Dave Portnoy announced that he was opening Barstool Chicago, which originally was led by Barstool Neil. Neil lived in Chicago at that time but was often lambasted by the Barstool fans for Neil having not originally been from Chicago. Katz began working part-time for Barstool. He did not want the fans to hate him like Neil and had a discussion regarding how to proceed, with Dave Portnoy. They agreed that he would downplay his upbringing in Massachusetts and solely present himself as a Chicago sports fan.

== Publications ==
- Pardon My Book, Big Cat and PFT Commenter, HarperCollins, 2026.
