= AIGO =

Research facility in Western Australia

Australian International Gravitational Observatory
- Alternative names: AIGO
- Location(s): Gingin, Western Australia, AUS

The Australian International Gravitational Observatory (AIGO) is a research facility located near Gingin, north of Perth in Western Australia. It is part of a worldwide effort to directly detect gravitational waves. Note that these are a major prediction of the general theory of relativity and are not to be confused with gravity waves, a phenomenon studied in fluid mechanics.

It is operated by the Australian International Gravitational Research Centre (AIGRC) through the University of Western Australia under the auspices of the Australian Consortium for Interferometric Gravitational Astronomy (ACIGA).

The current aim of the facility is to develop advanced techniques for improving the sensitivity of interferometric gravitational wave detectors such as LIGO, VIRGO and KAGRA. A study of operational interferometric gravitational wave detectors shows that AIGO is situated in almost the ideal location to complement existing detectors in the Northern hemisphere.

== Current facilities ==
Current facilities (AIGO Stage I) consist of an L-shaped ultra high vacuum system, measuring 80 m on each side, forming an interferometer for detecting gravitational waves.

== LIGO-Australia ==
LIGO-Australia was a proposed plan (AIGO Stage II) to install an Advanced LIGO interferometer at AIGO, forming a triangle of three Advanced LIGO detectors. It was to consist of an L-shaped interferometer, measuring 5 km on each side, with vacuum pipes about 700 mm in diameter.

A 2010 developmental roadmap issued by the Gravitational Wave International Committee (GWIC) for the field of gravitational-wave astronomy recommended that an expansion of the global array of interferometric detectors be pursued as a highest priority. In its roadmap, GWIC identified the Southern Hemisphere as one of the key locations in which a gravitational-wave interferometer could most effectively complement existing detectors. The AIGO facility in Western Australia was well-located to work with the existing and planned components of the global network, and already possessed an active gravitational-wave community.

The LIGO-Australia plan was approved by LIGO's US funding agency, the National Science Foundation, contingent on the understanding that it involved no increase in LIGO's total budget. The cost of building, operating and staffing the interferometer would have rested entirely with the Australian government. After a year-long effort, the LIGO Laboratory reluctantly acknowledged that the proposed relocation of an Advanced LIGO detector to Australia was not to occur. The Australian government had committed itself to a balanced budget and this precluded any new starts in science. The deadline for a response from Australia passed on 1 October 2011.

The proposal was then moved to India, where the Indian Initiative in Gravitational-wave Observations obtained some government support to pursue a similar plan, named LIGO-India, as AIGO had attempted. India is not quite as good a location as Australia, but it provides most of the benefit.

== Co-located facilities ==
AIGO is on the same grounds as the Gravity Discovery Centre and the GDC Observatory, which are educational and instructional facilities open to the general public. It is also the site of the Geoscience Australia Gingin Magnetic Observatory, one of a network of nine for monitoring the Earth's magnetic field.

== See also ==
- Interferometric gravitational-wave detector
