= List of programs distributed by Yippee TV =

The following is a list of programs that have been broadcast by the Christian-based American children’s free ad-supported streaming television (FAST) network and subscription video on-demand over-the-top streaming service Yippee TV.

== Original programming ==
- The VeggieTales Show (2019-22)

Yippee TV was the exclusive streaming service of The VeggieTales Show in 2019 and released new episodes monthly in 2020 and 2021 into 2022.

- Backseat Drivers
- Pete and Penelope
- This Cosmic Planet

Yippee TV premiered Making Magic at Home with Justin Flom and offers the shows such as The Yippee Show, Jay Jay the Jet Plane, Time2Dance, Hermie and Friends and Adventures from the Book of Virtues. Yippee TV also features content curated from YouTube and faith-based programming. Reviews of the service's content are positive, with Playlister noting "With a staggering selection of 5-star reviews to view online, it is clear that Yippee is a family favorite."

== Exclusive programming ==
Yippee TV includes original series with content that is available exclusively on Yippee, including:

- Danny Go! - Exclusive episodes and songs.
- Life of Riley - Behind the Scenes with Riley Rose
- Maggie's Market

== The Jim Henson Company programming ==
Yippee TV features several programs produced or distributed by The Jim Henson Company, including:

- Jim Henson's Animal Show
- Construction Site
- The Doozers
- Elias: Rescue Team Adventures
- The Hoobs
- Hi Opie!
- Jim Henson's Mother Goose Stories
- Pajanimals
- Secret Life of Toys
- The Wubbulous World of Dr. Seuss

== Other programming ==
Other programs on Yippee TV include:

- Maggie’s Market
- Danny Go!
- VeggieTales
- How Ridiculous
- Super Wings
- Superbook (1981 series)
- Superbook (2011 series)
- Listener Kids (Sing & Dance!)
- Cowboy Jack
- The Yippee Show
- Life of Riley
- The Moore the Merrier Vlogs
- Paisley's Corner With Silly Miss Lily
- Animals Doing Things
- Daily Devo
- Bibleman: The Animated Adventures
- Hey-0 Stories of The Bible
- Helper Cars
- Handyman Hal
- Sky & Finn
- Mini Explorers!
