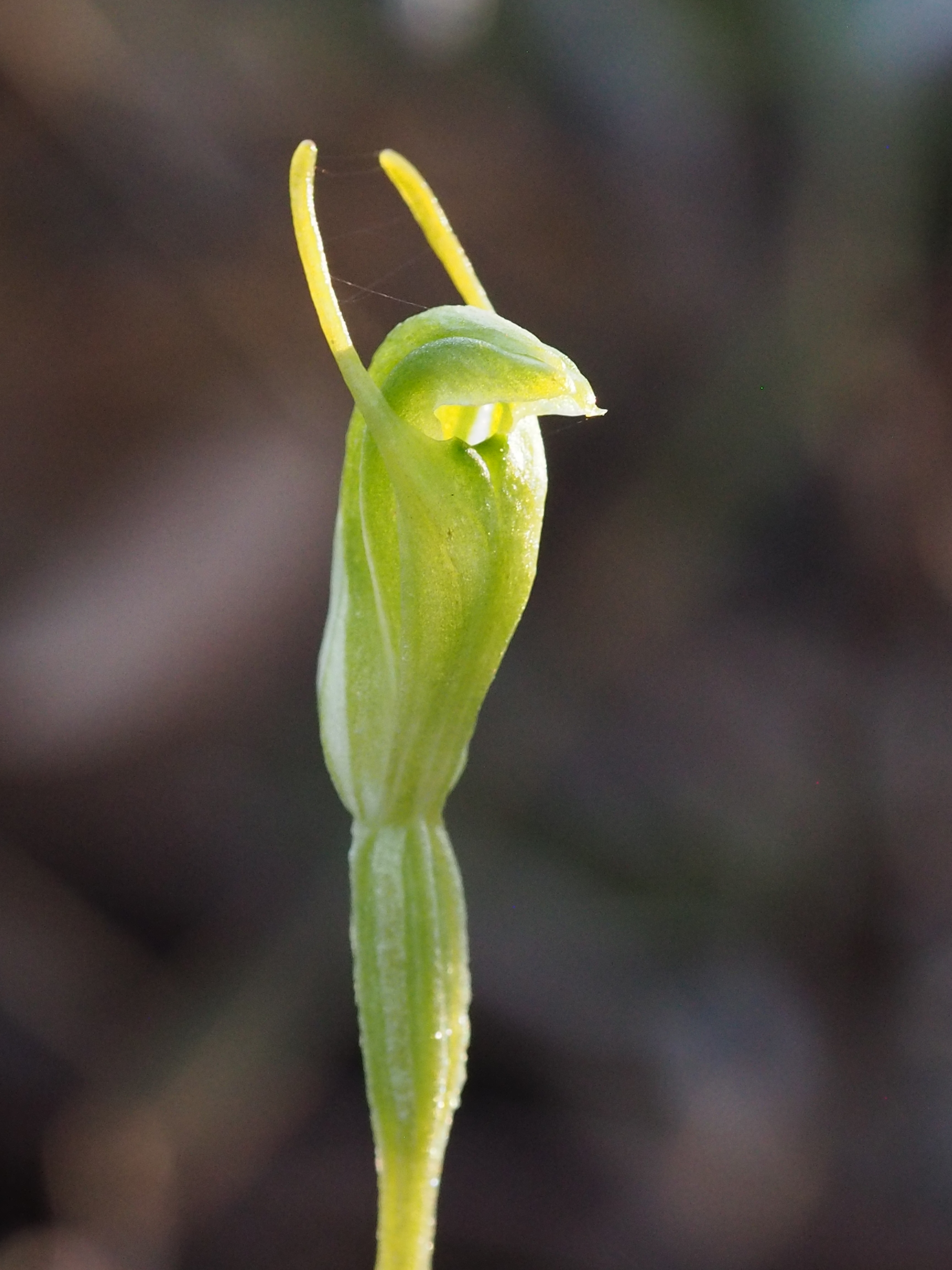

Scientific classification
- Kingdom: Plantae
- Clade: Tracheophytes
- Clade: Angiosperms
- Clade: Monocots
- Order: Asparagales
- Family: Orchidaceae
- Subfamily: Orchidoideae
- Tribe: Cranichideae
- Genus: Pterostylis
- Species: P. glebosa

Binomial name
- Pterostylis glebosa D.L.Jones & C.J.French

Synonyms
- Diplodium glebosum (D.L.Jones & C.J.French) D.L.Jones

= Pterostylis glebosa =

Clubbed snail orchid

Species of orchid

Pterostylis glebosa, commonly known as the clubbed snail orchid, is a species of orchid endemic to the south-west of Western Australia. Non-flowering plants have a rosette of leaves flat on the ground but flowering plants usually lack a rosette and have a single green and white flower with club-like lateral sepals. It sometimes forms colonies of thousands of plants.

== Description ==
Pterostylis glebosa is a terrestrial, perennial, deciduous, herb with an underground tuber which sometimes forms colonies of thousands of plants. Non-flowering plants have a rosette of leaves, each leaf 15–20 mm (0.6–0.8 in) long and 10–15 mm (0.4–0.6 in) wide. Flowering plants have a single green and white flower 12–17 mm (0.5–0.7 in) long and 7–9 mm (0.3–0.4 in) wide on a flowering stem 60–250 mm (2–10 in) high. There are between three and six leaves 10–25 mm (0.4–1 in) long and 5–14 mm (0.2–0.6 in) wide on the flowering stem. The dorsal sepal and petals are fused, forming a hood or "galea" over the column, the dorsal sepal with a blunt tip. The lateral sepals are held close to the galea, almost close off the front of the flower and have erect, tips 7–15 mm (0.3–0.6 in) long which have thickened, club-like tips. The labellum is relatively small and narrow but is not visible from outside the flower. Flowering occurs from August to October.

== Taxonomy and naming ==
Pterostylis glebosa was first formally described in 2014 by David Jones and Christopher French from a specimen collected near Gingin and the description was published in Australian Orchid Review. The species had previously been known as Pterostylis sp. 'clubbed snail orchid'. The specific epithet (glebosa) is a Latin word meaning "lumpy" referring to the swollen tips of the lateral sepals.

== Distribution and habitat ==
The clubbed snail orchid usually grows in swampy places, often amongst sedges and under Melaleuca species, sometimes with part of its flowering stem in shallow water. It occurs between Eneabba and Manjimup in the Jarrah Forest and Swan Coastal Plain biogeographic regions.

== Conservation ==
Pterostylis glebosa is listed as "not threatened" by the Government of Western Australia Department of Parks and Wildlife.
