= How Ridiculous =

Australian YouTube trio

- Logo since late 2019
- Born: Brett Isaac Stanford; 22 April 1988 (age 38) Derek Douglas Herron; 3 March 1988 (age 38) Scott Steven Gaunson; 3 January 1992 (age 34)

YouTube information
- Channel: howridiculous
- Years active: 2009–present
- Genre: Trickshots
- Subscribers: 24 million
- Views: 15.98 billion
- Last updated: 7 September 2026
- Website: howridiculous.org

How Ridiculous is an Australian YouTube channel based in Perth, Western Australia. The channel's main personalities are Brett Stanford, Derek Herron and Scott Gaunson. As of June 2026, they have more than 24 million subscribers and more than 15.83 billion video views. They are mostly known for their trick shots and for dropping objects onto other objects from a great height, typically 45 metres (148 ft). Objects that have been dropped by the channel include, but are not limited to, bowling balls, basketballs, anvils, lifting stones, custom-made heavy metal objects such as giant darts and a Mjölnir-like hammer, household appliances, cars/motor vehicles, and even a small plane. The group also frequently devises interesting targets to drop said objects onto, such as RC car race tracks, giant axe blades, multiple cans of spray paint or silly string taped/grouped together, bedliner-covered obstacles, a bulletproof glass table, and pools full of oobleck.

How Ridiculous also operates a TikTok page, which has 14.3 million followers and over 332.2 million likes as of June 2026. As of July 2025, episodes are also featured on the Yippee TV streaming service.

== History ==
The group, whose members met at church, began in 2009, with trick shot videos made for fun in backyards, originally with fourth member Kyle Nebel, who left the group in March 2015. Historically, the trio's main stunts have been trick shots, finding creative ways to destroy objects, and throwing or dropping objects from great heights. Many of their videos since 2015 are recorded at the Gravity Discovery Centre at the Leaning Tower of Gingin. Recently, the group has also made several videos testing various objects' ability to be thrown or propelled through obstacles, such as weather balloons, panes of glass, and sheets of drywall.

In late 2021, How Ridiculous began releasing a series of shorts on both YouTube and Instagram; some contain clips from longer videos, but most involve multi-step races where competitors must quickly complete challenges such as popping balloons, smashing glass, unlocking doors, and making basketball shots. These shorts, all less than a minute long, became instant viral hits across both websites, garnering hundreds of millions of views and prompting the team to release many longer-format videos with similar themes. Currently, How Ridiculous' most-viewed full-length YouTube video, uploaded November 2021, is a competition between the three stars at RAC Arena in Perth. Stanford, Gaunson, and Herron used various objects to attempt to pop multiple weather balloons in a row, filming the results on a Phantom camera. The best performing objects were an arrow shot from a recurved bow, and a pile of screws thrown all at once, both of which popped 11 balloons. In January 2022, this balloon video displaced the previous longstanding leader, uploaded October 2018, in which Brett Stanford dropped a bowling ball onto a trampoline from 165 metres (541 ft) at the Luzzone Dam in Switzerland. Besides Switzerland and RAC Arena, the group has filmed special videos in many locations in Australia and around the globe, such as Optus Stadium, Perth Motorplex, Texas, Montana, Los Angeles, Utah Olympic Park Jumps, Turkey, Lesotho, Dubai, Serbia, Sheffield, New Zealand, and the Australian Outback.

On 19 October 2018, the group released another highly popular video, in which they dropped a giant metal dart onto a table of bulletproof glass from 45m up. The dart became embedded almost perfectly halfway through the glass, and the image was considered so artistic/iconic that the group saved the sheet of glass and dart as it was, later making a new table out of it which now sits at the Gravity Discovery Centre as an attraction. They also released a limited edition T-shirt of the visual of the dart stuck in the glass.

In recent years, the trio added a fourth member to the recurring team, Jack Wallace aka "Editor Jack", whose primary job is camerawork and post-production editing. However, he has appeared in person in several videos, most notably a video in which he showed his skills at speedcubing while riding a waterslide at Aquaventure in Dubai. The team have also had several friends, celebrities, and fellow YouTube stars occasionally assist with the videos. The most frequently recurring friends are named Harrison, Michael, and Big Nick, and guest appearances include MrBeast, Tiger Woods, Ernie Els, Mark Rober, Rick Shiels, The Slow Mo Guys, Shadiversity, Team Edge, Matt Carriker, YBS Youngbloods, Gabriel Conte, and Manchester City players Erling Haaland, Phil Foden, and Rico Lewis. Rober, in his appearance, helped the team build a two-ton, Kevlar-and-steel trampoline which was featured afterwards in several videos. The collaboration with The Slow Mo Guys, which took place in Montana, also included YouTuber BealsScience, who created two large cannons mounted on the backs of Jeeps for the team to make use of.

On 9 October 2020, How Ridiculous launched a spin-off channel titled HR Gaming, in which the trio, Editor Jack and his brother Toby Wallace competed in various games such as Among Us, Minecraft, Rocket League and Fortnite, often with secondary challenges to make playing the games more difficult. This second channel was not initially as successful as the main channel, and was inactive for a period of time. On 3 October 2024, however, a new video was posted to the HR Gaming channel. The team indicated that they intended to continue to produce content on both channels.

== Guinness World Records ==
In 2017, the trio set the current Guinness World Record for "Longest golf putt (non-tournament)" at 120.6 metres (396 ft). The record was achieved by Stanford, who sunk the putt in question at the Point Walter golf course in Western Australia. The shot was covered in one of their videos, uploaded on 23 February 2017. Since then, World's Longest Putt has surpassed the record with a putt measuring 122.2 meters (401.2 feet).

On 19 January 2018, How Ridiculous uploaded a video in which their basketball shot from 201.42 metres (660.8 ft) set the previous record for "Greatest height from which a basketball is shot." This took place at the Maletsunyane Falls in Lesotho, Africa, and was achieved by Herron. This marked the fifth time that How Ridiculous would hold this particular record, since they first broke it in 2011 with a ball shot from 66.89 metres (219.5 ft) in height. Herron's record would stand until May 2023, when the record was broken by Dude Perfect in Las Vegas.

In a video released 27 August 2021, Stanford also attempted to set the Guinness World Record for "Greatest height from which a ping pong ball is tossed into a red plastic cup". The shot was successfully made from the catwalk of the RAC Arena in Perth, but failed to qualify for the record because the cup in use was 90 millimetres (3.5 in) in diameter instead of the regulation 85 millimetres (3.3 in). How Ridiculous announced that the oversight was completely unintentional, and that they intend to try again at a later date with a correctly sized cup.

== Business ventures ==
In May 2019, the trio began to use a Tyrannosaurus rex test dummy that they named "Rexy", to assist with aiming items during their various video stunts. Rexy's debut video currently has more than five million views; the dummy would go on to make appearances in the vast majority of the team's subsequent videos, has its own Instagram page, and is listed on How Ridiculous' website as an official team member. Rexy has become a popular part of the channel, with the original Rexy dummy and various Rexy replicas being used either individually or in bulk for several large-scale stunts. The team also dedicated their 1 Billion Views Celebration Video to Rexy, using over four thousand of the dinosaurs to crush a car.

In October 2023, How Ridiculous launched their own clothing brand, Rexy Clothing, named after and inspired by the success of the dinosaur test dummy on the channel. The brand includes a variety of clothes for adults and children, all with Rexy's name or image on them as a logo, some of which were customized by paint and ink during video stunts. Periodically, the website will also have replica Rexys on offer, usually customized to resemble the worn and stitched up appearance of the original doll, and occasionally customized by paint or autographs during the course of making videos. The launch of the clothing line was announced in a video in which Rexy was sent into the upper atmosphere by Sheffield-based YouTubers SentIntoSpace; this video currently has more than 1.5 million views.

== Tea Industries ==
In March 2025, How Ridiculous announced the launch of their own healthy drinks company, Tea Industries, during the video "How Many Trampolines Stop an Arrow".

The brand's official launch video, "Can 1000 Exercise Balls Bounce a Falling Car", was released in October 2025.
