= Inclined tower =

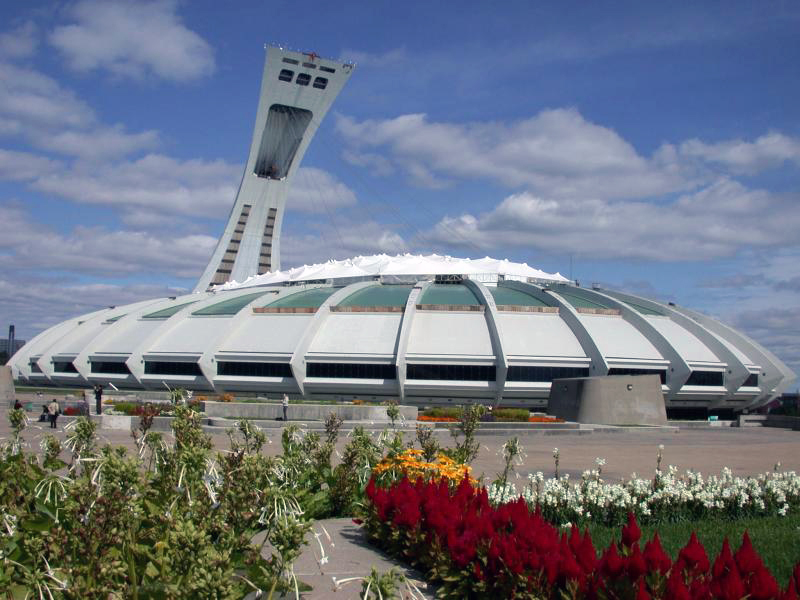
Montreal Tower

An inclined tower is a tower that was intentionally built at an incline. Towers are built with an incline in order to support the weight of another structure, such as the Montreal Tower. Some towers are built with an incline due to the steep terrain upon which they stand, or simply for aesthetics.

== Design ==
Despite the outward appearance of an inclined tower as "leaning-over", they are as structurally sound as any non-inclined tower. The mass of the tower's upper section is always equal or less than the mass of the tower's lower section, ensuring the building remains balanced around its centre of mass.

== Inclined tower vs. inclined building ==
Inclined towers are specifically distinguished from "inclined buildings" in that they are not built to be habitable, but to serve other functions. The principal function is the use of their height to enable various functions to be achieved, including: visibility of other features attached to the tower such as clock towers; as part of a larger structure or device to increase the visibility of the surroundings for defensive purposes as in a fortified building such as a castle; as a structure for observation for leisure purposes; or as a structure for telecommunication purposes. Towers can be stand alone structures or be supported by adjacent buildings or can be a feature on top of a large structure or building.

== Tallest inclined towers ==
As of September 2019, this list includes all intentionally inclined towers which reach a height of 60 metres (197 ft) or more, as assessed by their pinnacle. Inclined buildings and inclined structures that are not designed for public or regular operational access are excluded from this list.

Rank	Name	Image	Location	Country	Height m (ft)	Floors	Year	Notes	Ref
1	Tour de Montréal		Montreal, Quebec	Canada	165 m (541 ft)	20	1987	Tallest inclined tower in the world since 1987. Features an inclination of 45°.	
2	Signature Bridge		Delhi	India	154 m (505 ft)	1	2018	An inclined cantilever spar cable-stayed bridge tower featuring an observation deck.	
3	Most SNP		Bratislava	Slovakia	95 m (312 ft)	1	1972	An inclined cable-stayed bridge tower featuring an observation deck and restaurant.	

== Other examples ==
=== Towers ===
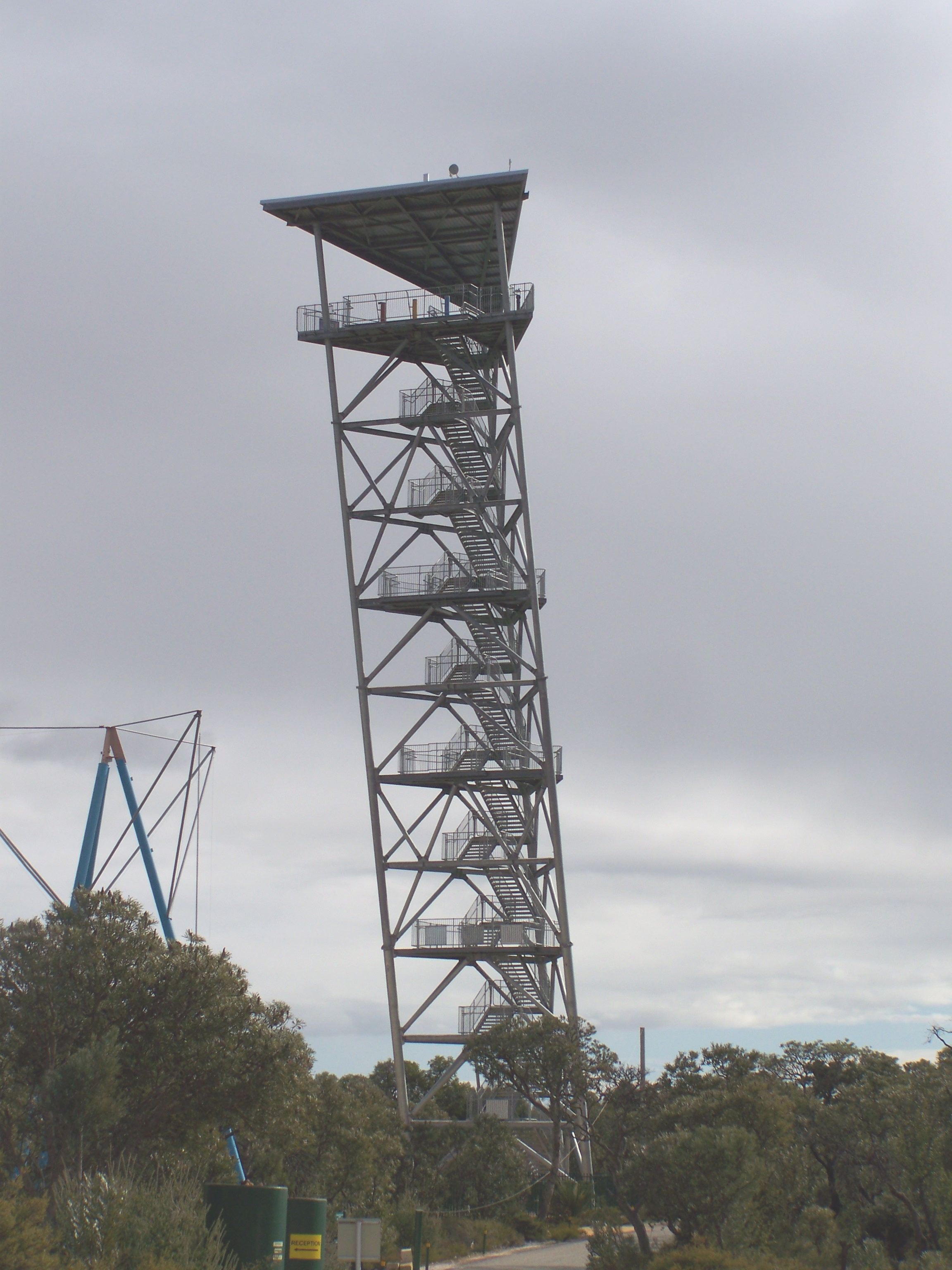
The Leaning Tower of Gingin

- The Capo Grande Tower is a proposed 111 m (364 ft) additionally-supported inclined observation tower located in Koper, Slovenia overlooking the city and the Gulf of Koper.
- The Gravity Discovery Centre and Observatory located in Gingin, Western Australia, Western Australia features a 45 m (148 ft) tall inclined tower designed so that visitors can recreate the experiments of Galileo Galilei.

=== Structures ===
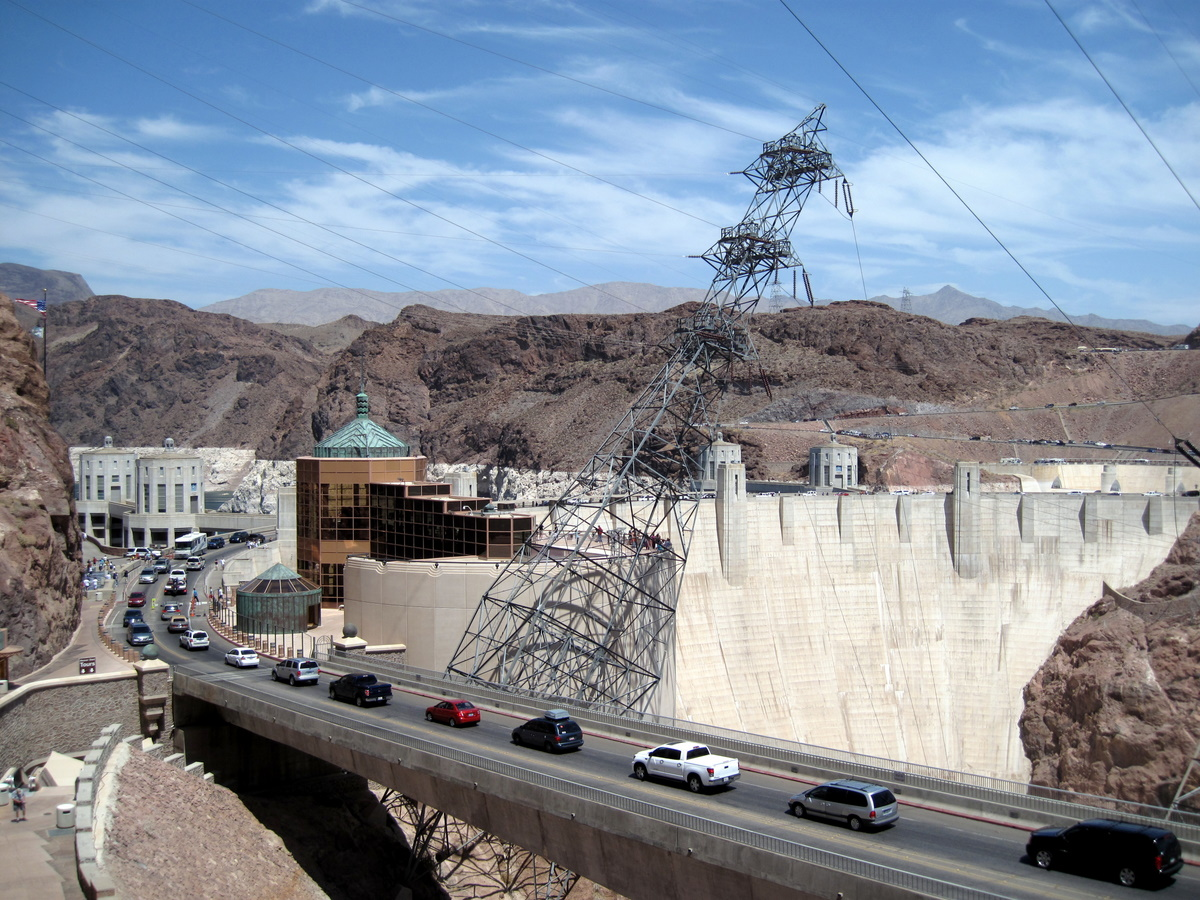
Inclined transmission tower at the Hoover Dam.

- An inclined structure is used to hold the roof of Schwarzwald-Baar-Center, a mall in Villingen-Schwenningen, Germany.
- Many inclined transmission towers can be found at the Hoover Dam on the border of Arizona and Nevada.
- The Alamillo Bridge in Seville, Andalusia, Spain features a 70.7 m (232 ft) tall bridge tower.
- The Montjuïc Communications Tower is a 136 m (446 ft) tall inclined telecommunications tower located in Barcelona, Catalonia, Spain.
- The Palm Springs Aerial Tramway just outside of the city of Palm Springs, California features five inclined support towers, three of which are completely self-supporting (Towers 3, 4, and 5).
- Tower 1 of the Sandia Peak Tramway measures 70.7 m (232 ft) tall and features an 18° incline pointing back toward the city of Albuquerque, New Mexico.
- The Seri Wawasan Bridge in Putrajaya, Malaysia features a 75° forward‐inclined pylon with a height of 96m.

== See also ==
- Inclined building
- List of leaning towers
- List of tallest towers
- Cable-stayed bridge
