= Gravity Discovery Centre =

Science museum in Western Australia

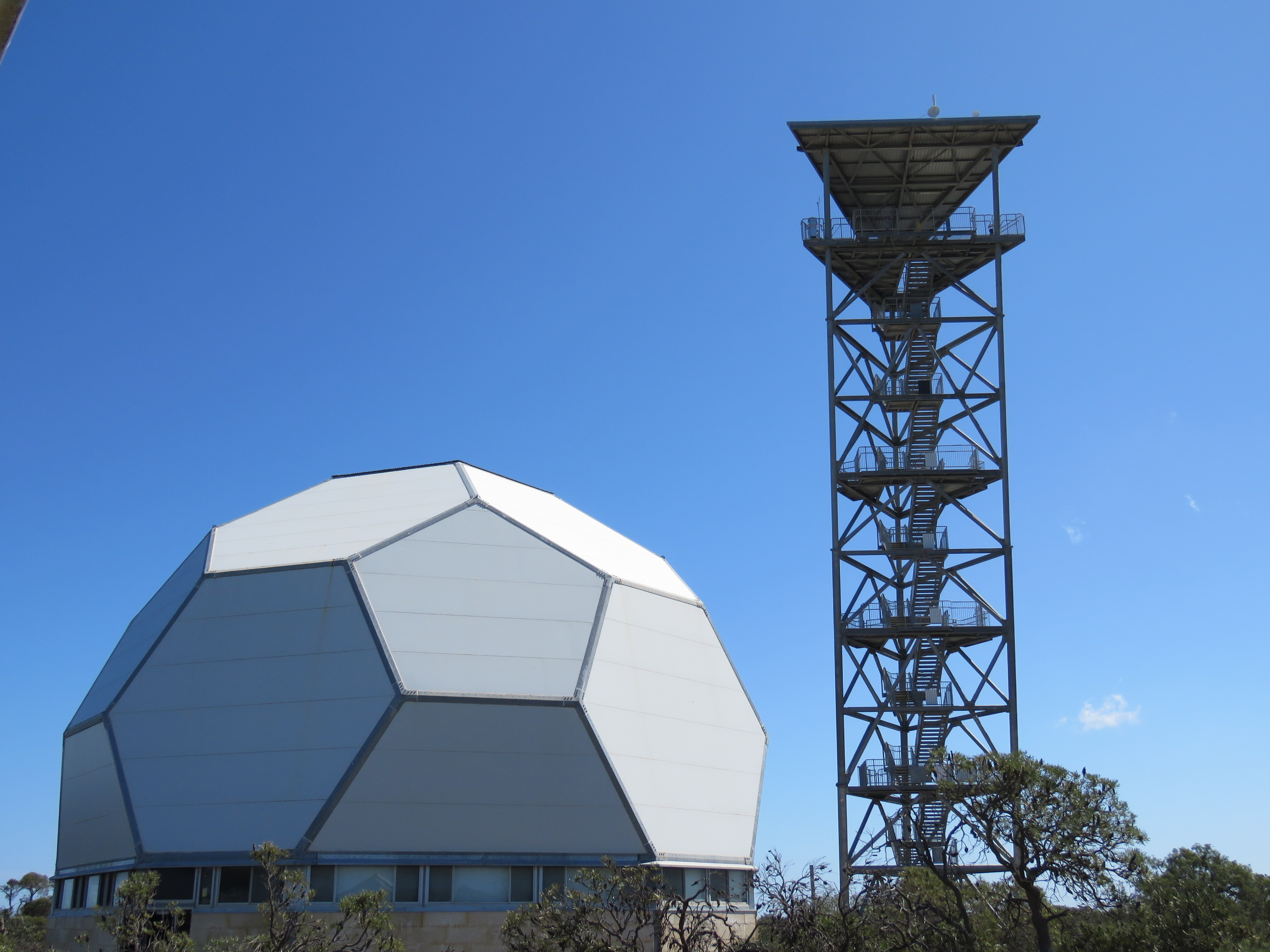
- Coordinates: 31°21′21″S 115°42′45″E
- Type: Science museum
- Website: http://www.gravitycentre.space/

The Gravity Discovery Centre and Observatory is a "hands-on" science education, astronomy, Aboriginal culture and tourist centre, situated on the site of the Gravity Precinct in bushland near Gingin, north of Perth, Western Australia.

It is a not-for-profit interactive science education centre, operated by The Gravity Discovery Centre Foundation Board Inc. It received government funding of $300,000 to cover the period 2021-2023. The Department of Biodiversity Conservation and Attractions manages the bushland surrounding the Discovery Centre and the observatory.

In 2005, John de Laeter and David Blair were awarded the Eureka Prize for "promoting [the] understanding of science" in recognition of his creation of the Gravity Discovery Centre.

== Exhibits ==
=== The Discovery Centre ===
- Magnetic Cart

Visitors can roll this cart, which has strong magnets attached to it, down a ramp. They are invited to notice how it slows down as it passes over the metal plates, which are made of copper or aluminium: both good electrical conductors. The moving magnet creates electricity in the metal plates – the kinetic energy of the cart is converted to electrical energy, slowing it down.

- OzGrav Model

OzGrav is the abbreviation for the ARC Centre of Excellence for Gravitational Wave Discovery.

- Bernoulli Ball

Bernoulli's principle explains that an increase in the speed of air produces a decrease in static pressure. The principle is named after Daniel Bernoulli who published it in his book Hydrodynamica in 1738.

In this interactive display, when the ball moves to the side it is pushed back toward the centre of the air flow. The upward flow of air provides an upward force on the ball keeping it suspended – apparently defying gravity.

- Space Capsule

This spinning display demonstrates gravitational forces.

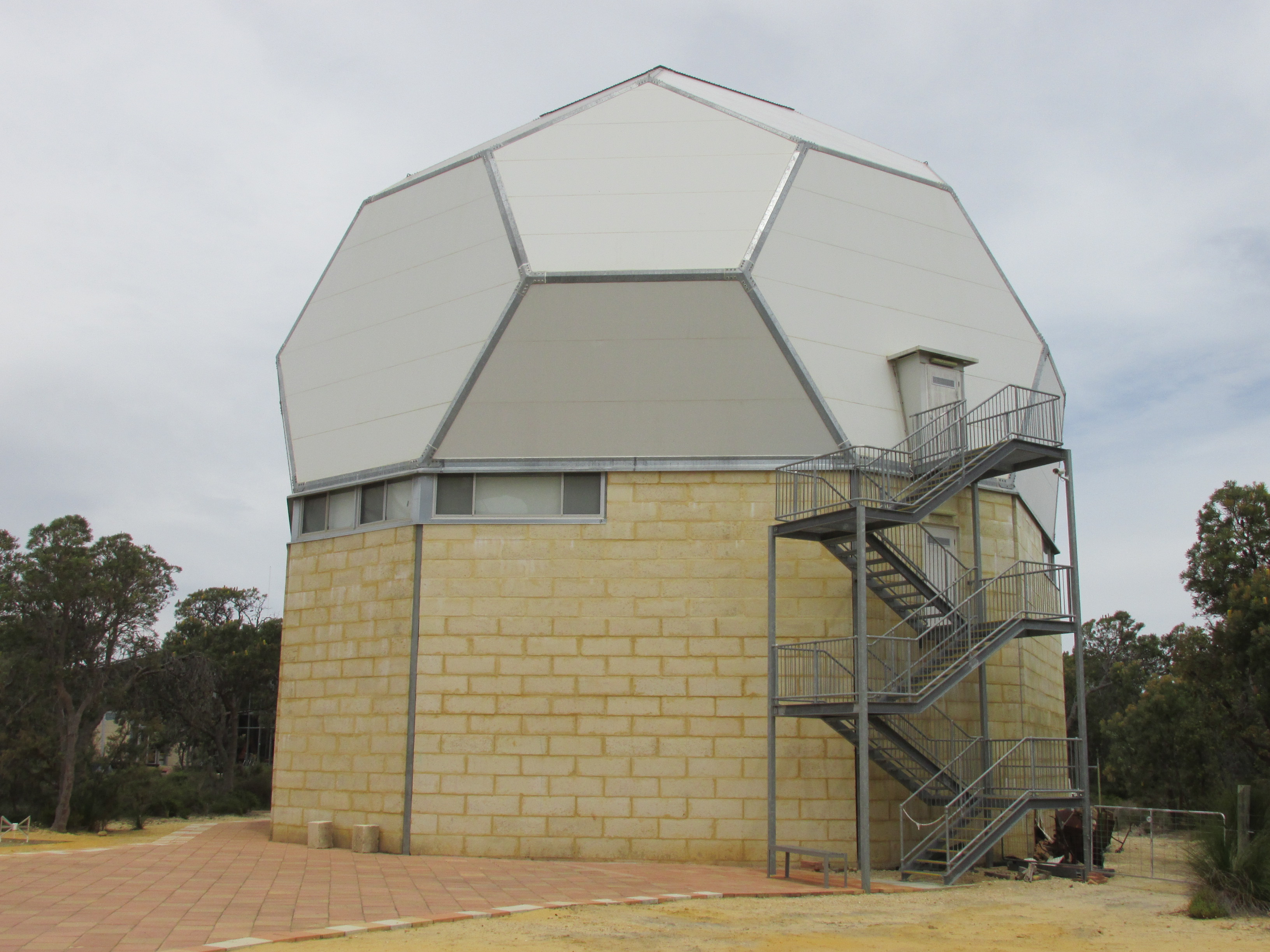
Cosmology Gallery with geodesic dome roof

=== The Cosmology Gallery ===
This gallery is topped with a 20-metre (66 ft) diameter geodesic dome

- NIOBE, the first Southern Hemisphere gravitational wave detector.

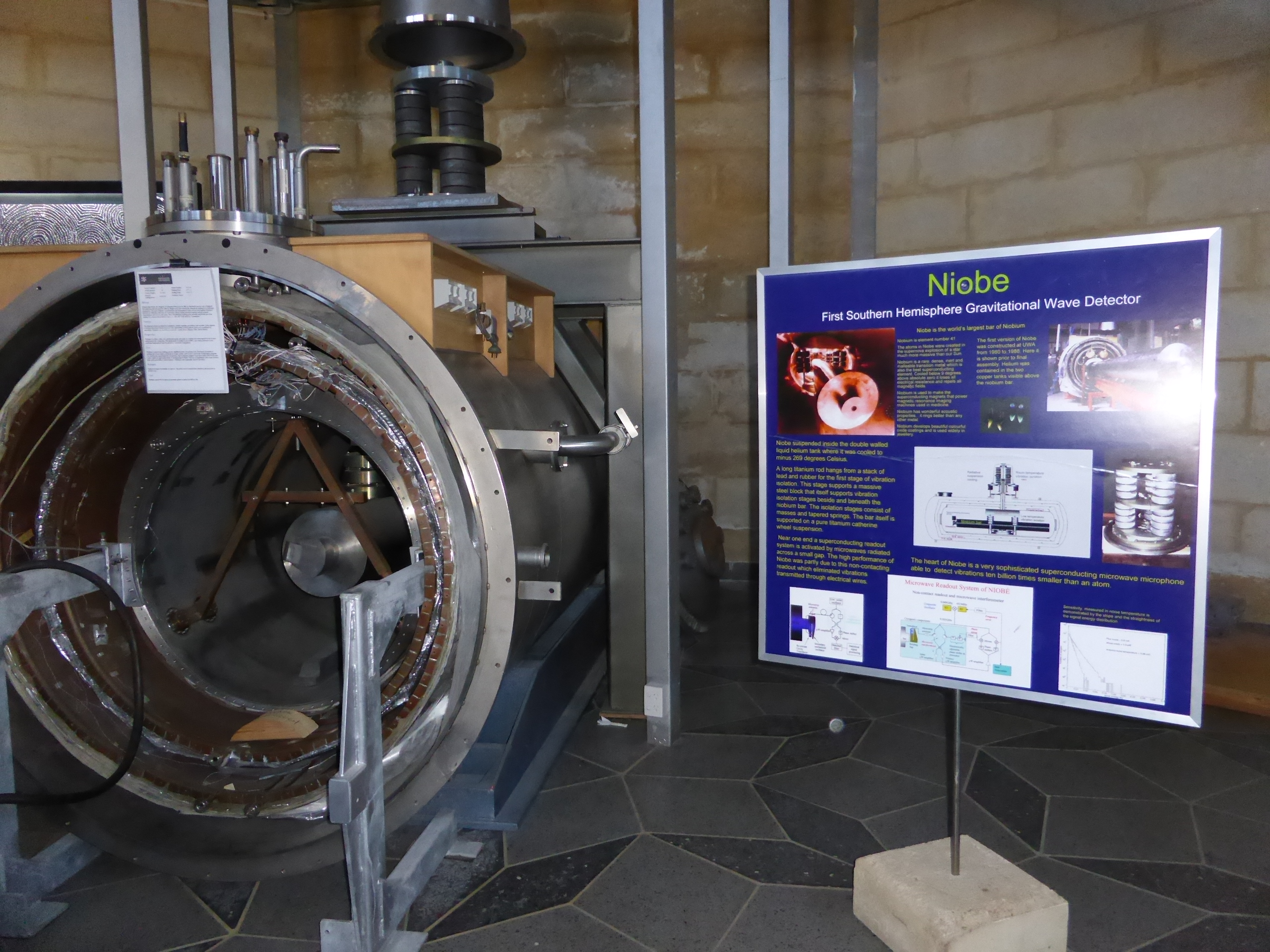
The Niobe display

The search for gravitational waves began in the 1990s and this detector, called NIOBE, was one of five set up around the world as part of that search. At its heart is a niobium bar. This niobium bar gravitational wave detector, and associated superconducting electromechanical sensors, were developed by Professor David Blair of UWA. It came into operation in 1993 after 16 years, 12 PhD projects and several million dollars to build. This worldwide experiment set limits to the strength of gravitational waves and paved the way for the next generation of detectors. They achieved world-record sensitivity and opened a new area of research into quantum measurement and optomechanics. Note: Gravitational waves are ripples in the curvature of spacetime caused by huge cosmic events like the Big Bang and the collision of black holes.

- Timeline from the Big Bang to the present

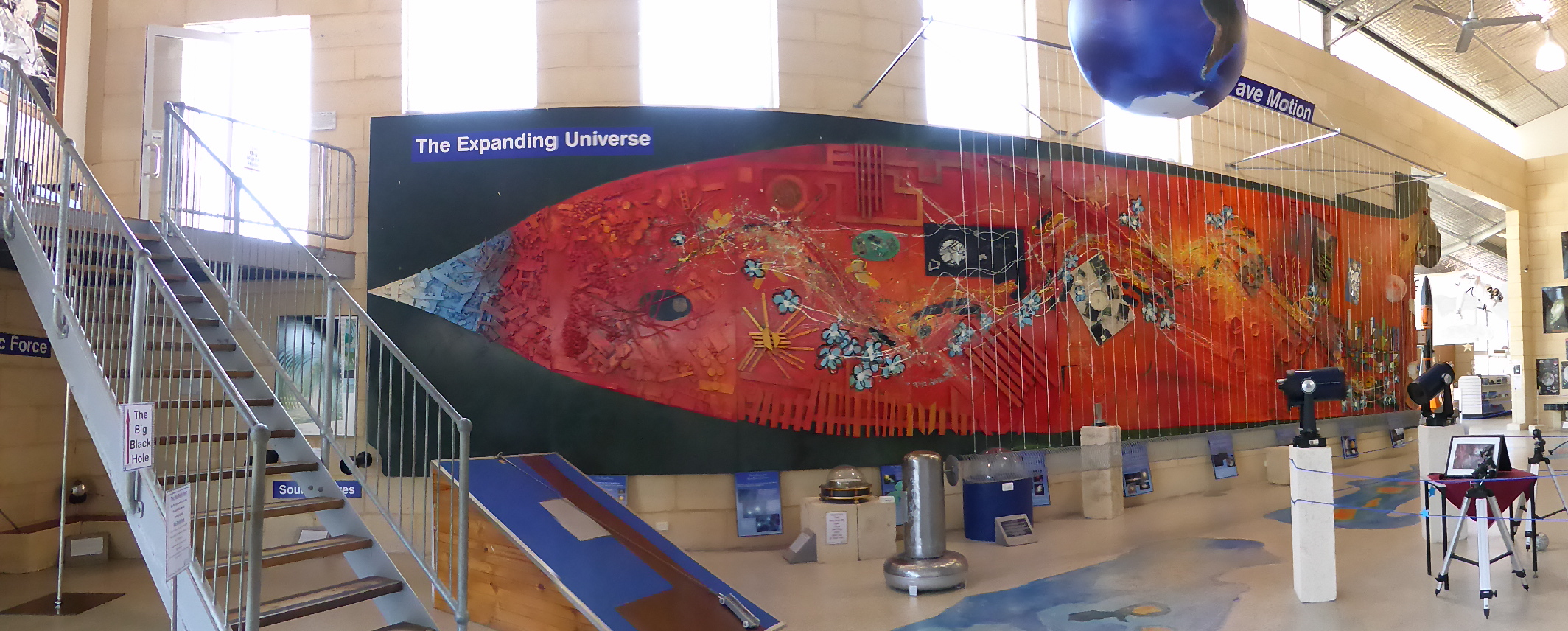
The expanding universe display

The Timeline of the Universe in the Cosmology Gallery tells the story of the creation of the universe – from the Big Bang right through to the present. It shows all the different stages of development and evolution of planet Earth. There are stories, as well as real fossils to look at on the Timeline. This display asks visitors to consider questions regarding themselves and the Universe they live in.

- Penrose Floor

Attempting to tile a plane with regular pentagons must necessarily leave gaps. Mathematician Roger Penrose found a particular tiling in which the gaps may be filled with three other shapes: a star, a boat, and a diamond. In addition to the tiles, Penrose stated rules, usually called matching rules, that specify how tiles must be attached to one another; these rules are needed to ensure that the tilings are non-periodic. There are three distinct sets of matching rules for pentagonal tiles, shown in different colours in the illustration. This leads to a set of six tiles: a thin rhombus or “diamond”, a five-pointed star, a “boat” and three pentagons.

- Astrophotography
- The Australian Shaman Exhibition – Indigenous Australians’ connection to and understanding of the night sky, including many artworks depicting the stories told to explain what they observed.
- Coherence to Chaos Exhibition
- Multicultural artwork
- Southern Cross Cosmos Centre, home to the GDC Observatory
- The Zadko Telescope, a robotic optical telescope.

=== The Solar System Walk ===
The Solar System Walk is an educational 1km scale model of the Solar System. The walk begins at the Sun and disappears along a track through native bush. Alongside the track, model planets and their moons are located at the correct scaled distances from the Sun. Information plaques are located at each planet. The walk finishes at Pluto, although Pluto is now defined as a dwarf planet, rather than a planet. On the 1km scale model, the relative size of the Earth should be about the size of a peppercorn. And Saturn should only be the size of a peanut or a coffee bean, Mercury should be the size of a cake freckle, Jupiter should be almost the size of a golf ball and Pluto should be the size of a pin head. However, the centre staff have multiplied the size scale of the planets and moons by a factor of 200, to allow visitors to view more practically sized model planets and moons. The Solar System Walk is designed to give an understanding of true sizes and distances in the Solar System, and the vastness of the Universe. During the walk visitors might spot one of the centre's resident kangaroos. Wildflowers are abundant in this area during late winter and spring. As noted above, because Pluto is now considered a “dwarf planet”, visitors will find a replica of Pluto at his final resting place: a satin-lined coffin in the main exhibition area of the GDC.

=== Biodiversity Gallery ===
In the Biodiversity Gallery, visitors can view displays about some of the local flora and fauna. The south-west of Australia is regarded as one of the world's “biodiversity hotspots” with many endemic species that are under threat. Local bushland surrounding the centre is inhabited by some rare and endangered species of plants and animals. The gallery aims to celebrate the rich diversity of plant and animal species in the area. Insect specimens, such as a native bee, have been submersed in resin for visitors to view under the microscope. Samples of local wildflowers are also presented for examination.

Biodiversity Walks around the site (often with a guide) enable visitors to view a great diversity of plant species in a short walk. Ancient paperbark trees (Melaleuca sp.), between 800 and 1000 years old, exist in the area beside the Leaning Tower.

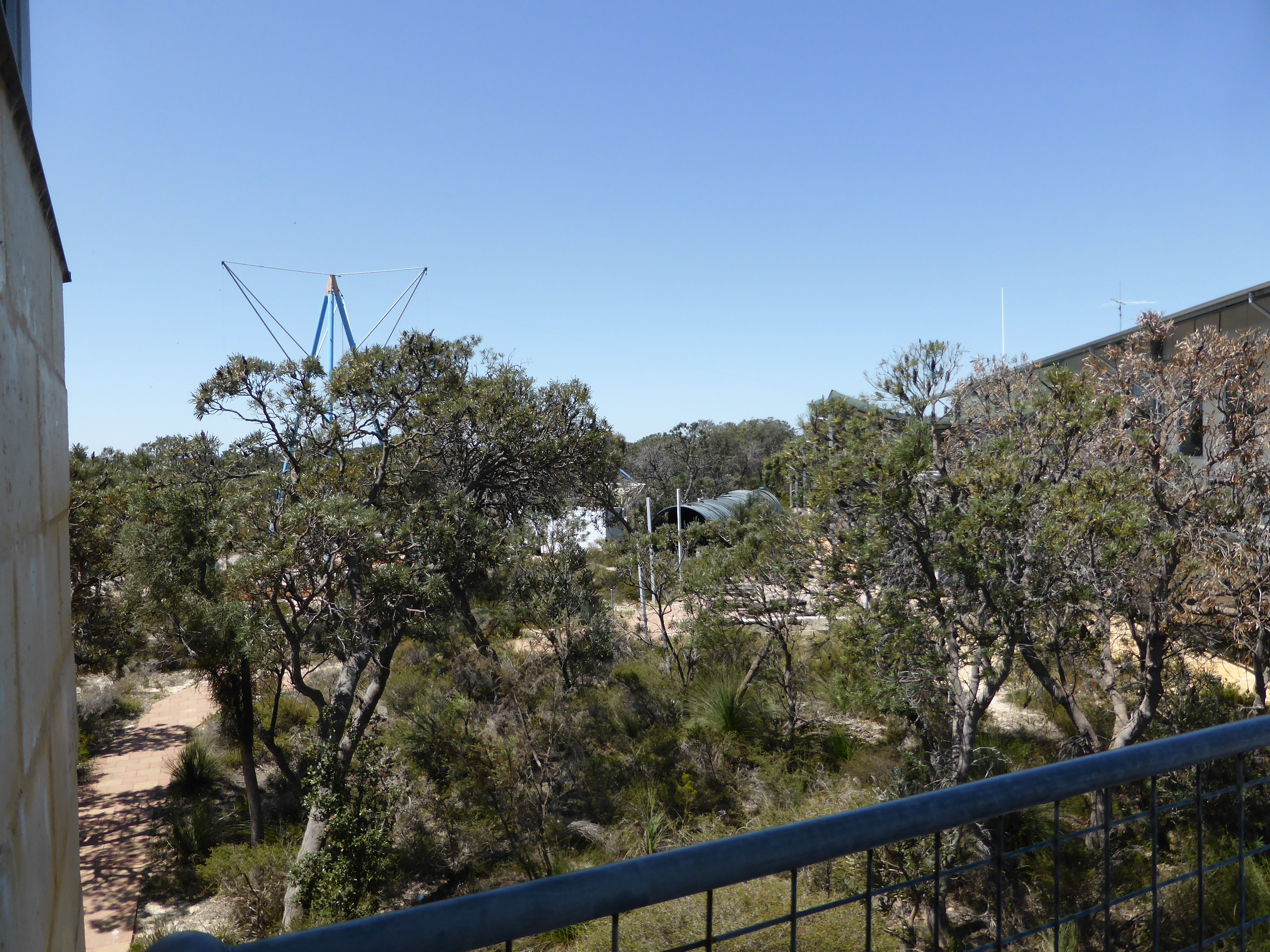
A view across the site

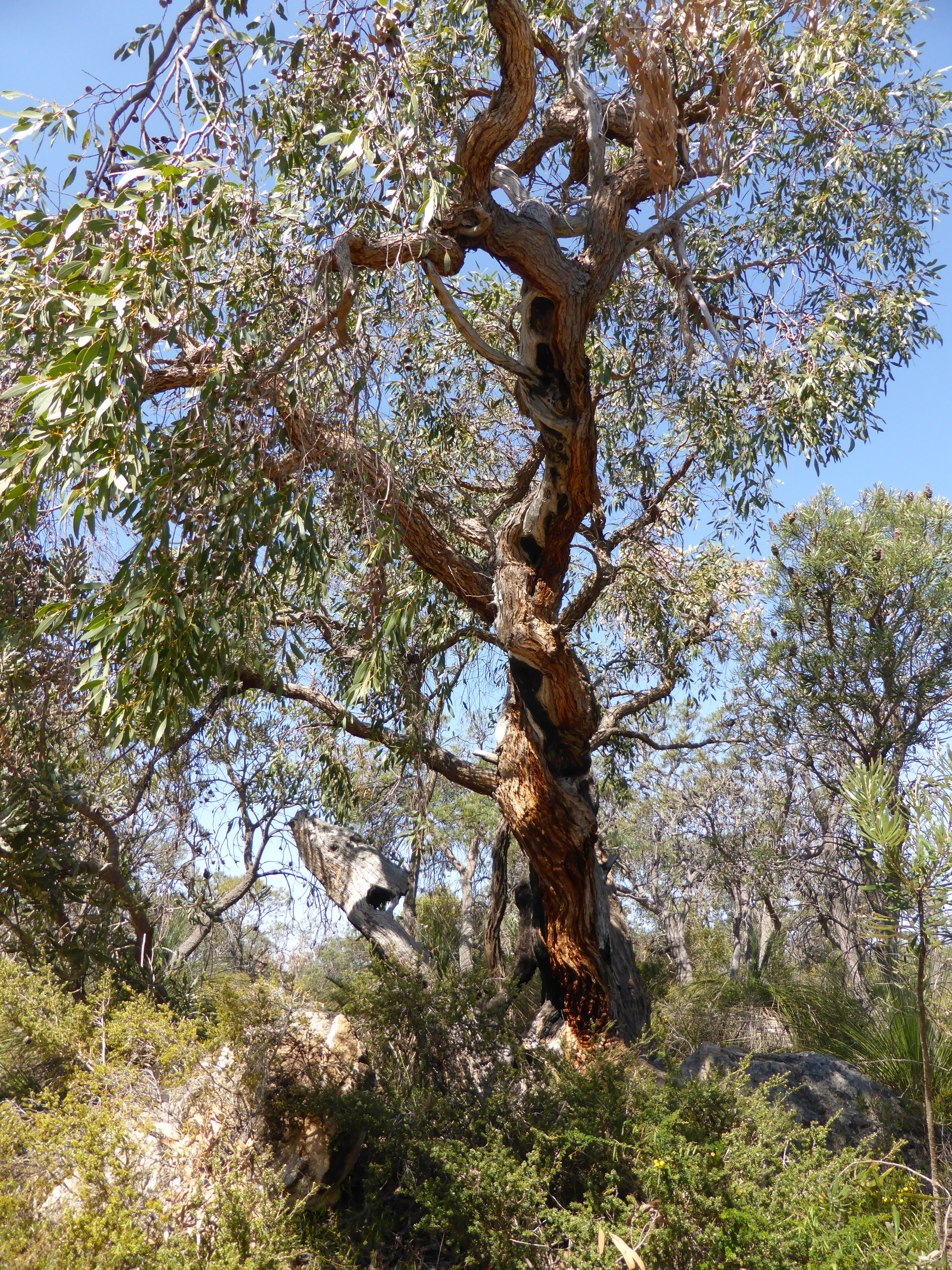
A twisted Marri tree (Corymbia calophylla)

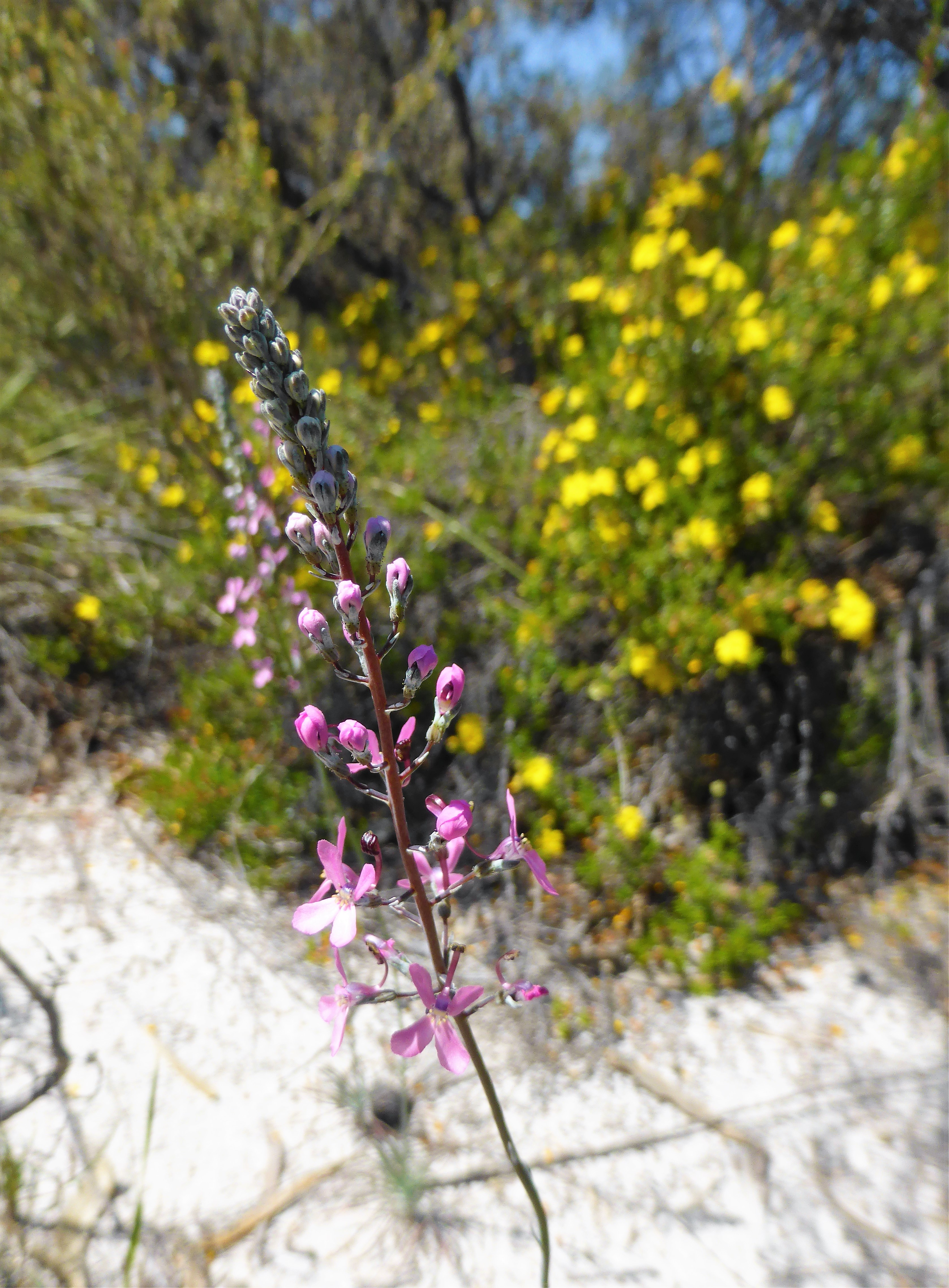
Wildflowers at site: Stylidium sp. or Trigger Plant (foreground) and Hibbertia sp. (background)

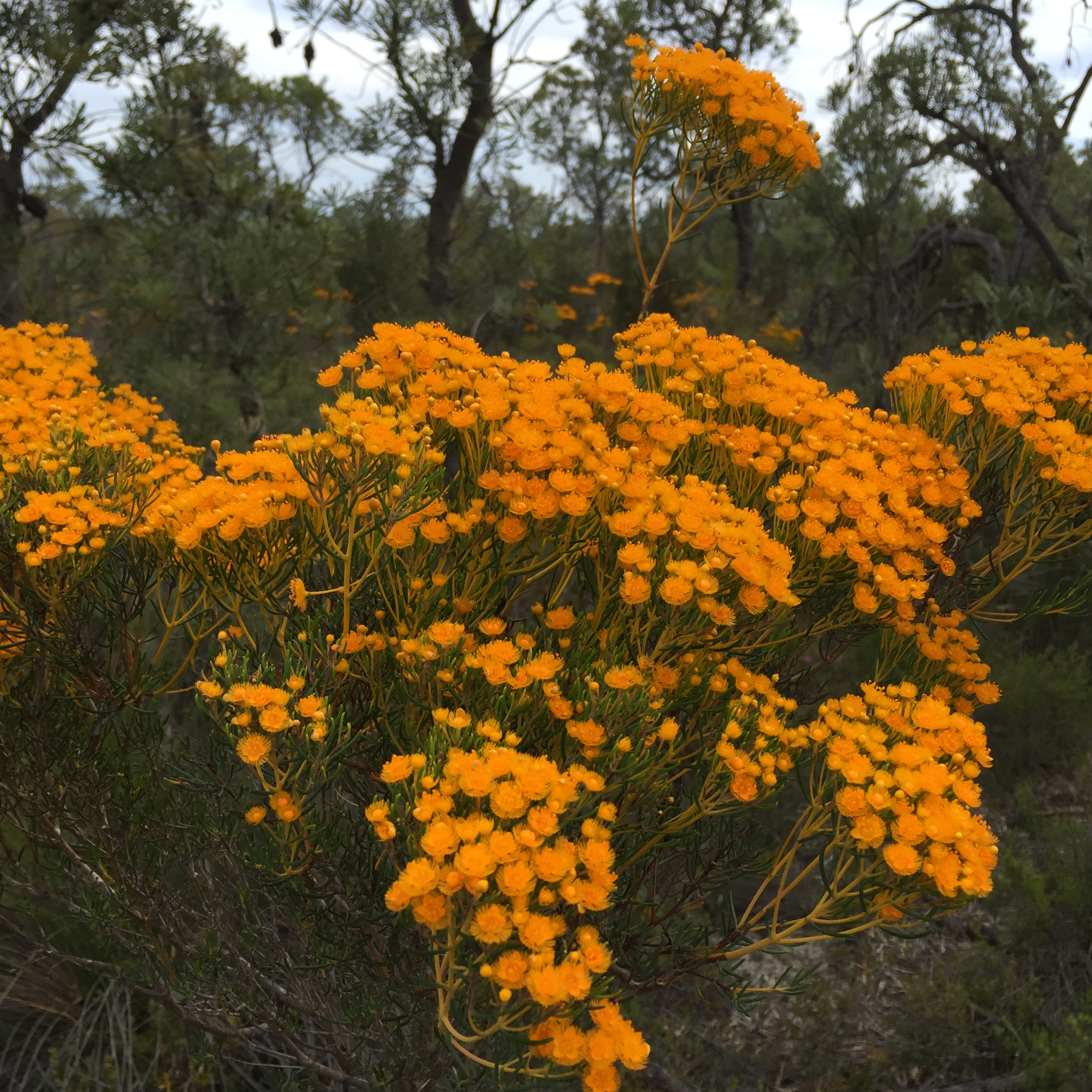
Verticordia nitens (Morrison)

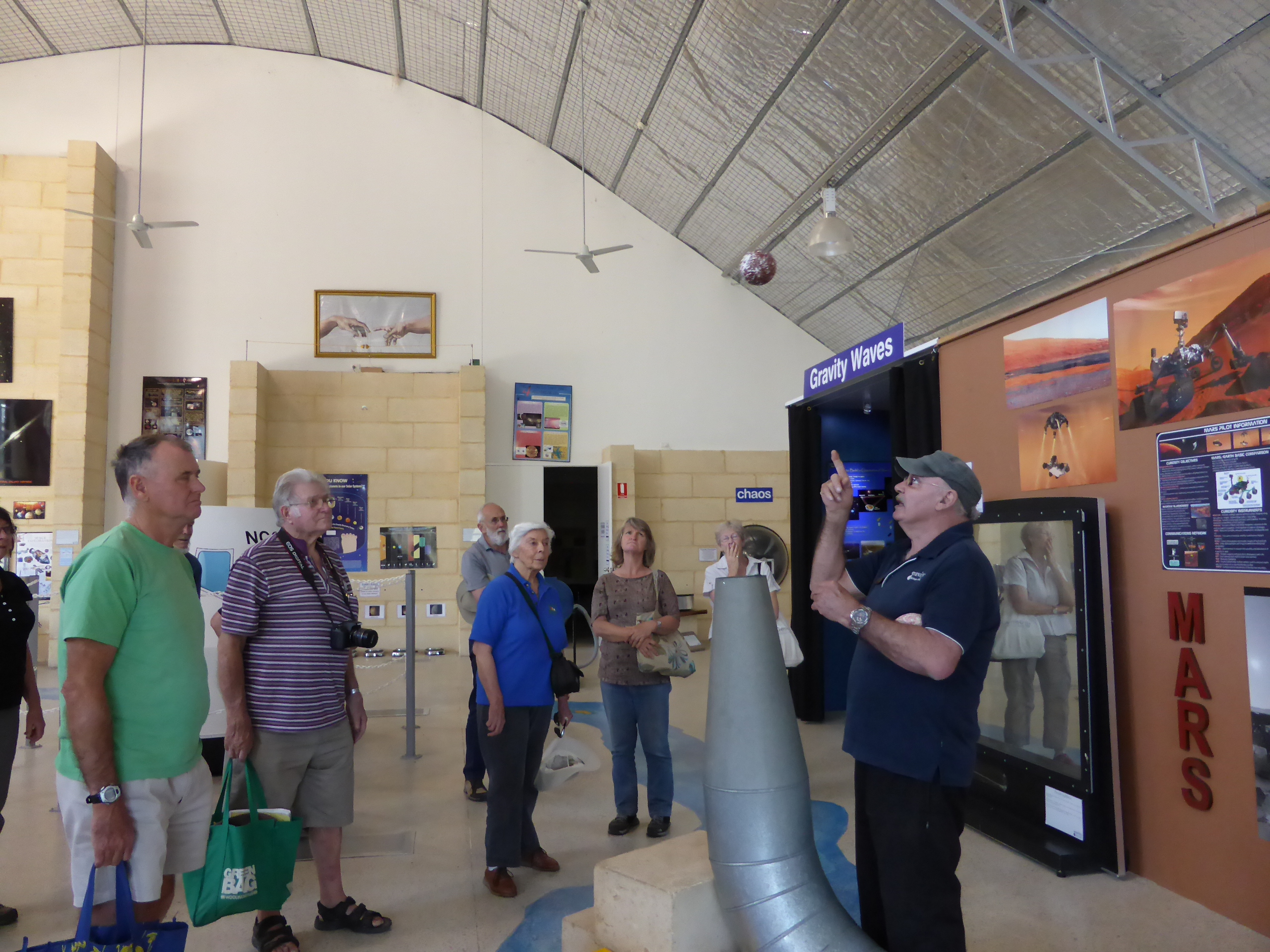
Demonstrating the Bernoulli effect

The Gravity Discovery Centre is located on state government managed land and the surrounding bushland is in its original state, unchanged for thousands of years. The wildflowers provide a colourful display every spring. The bright orange-yellow Morrison shrubs (Verticordia nitens) begin to bloom in November, with the display lasting through to mid-January. However, many other plants and animals can be found all year round.

=== The Leaning Tower of Gingin ===
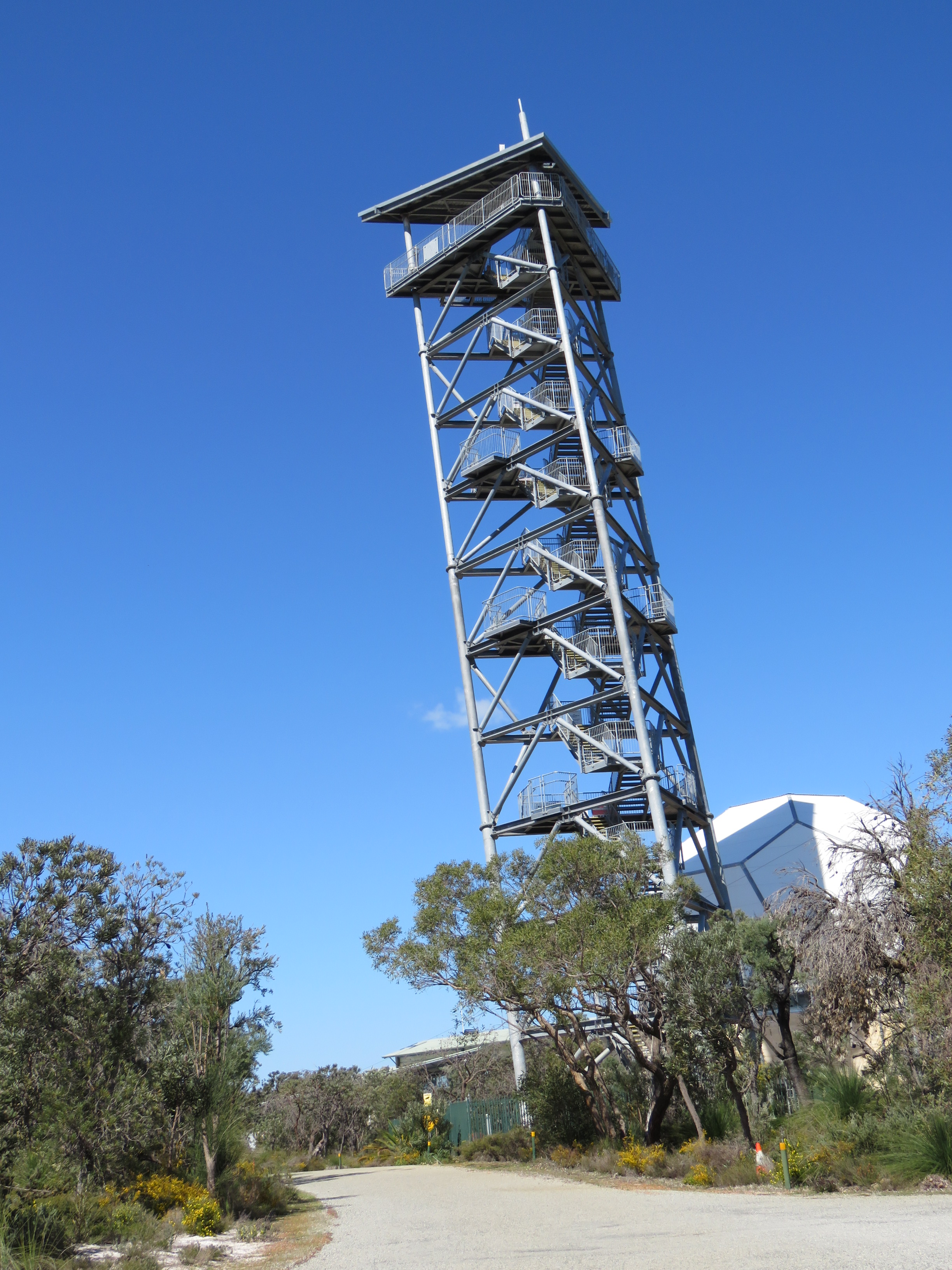
The Leaning Tower of Gingin

The Leaning Tower of Gingin is a purpose built 45-metre (148 ft) tall steel inclined tower, designed so that visitors can recreate the experiments of Galileo Galilei. There are 222 steps to the top from where balloons filled with water can be dropped through chutes. The tower leans at an angle of 15 degrees and held in place by 180 tons of concrete. The drop tower is also used by the YouTube channel "How Ridiculous" & "Mark Rober" for various drop tests.

== Reception ==
As of September 2021, Tripadvisor has 121 reviews of the centre, with an average score of four stars out of a possible five.
