= Maletsunyane Falls =

Waterfall in Lesotho

Coordinates: 29°52′07″S 28°03′06″E

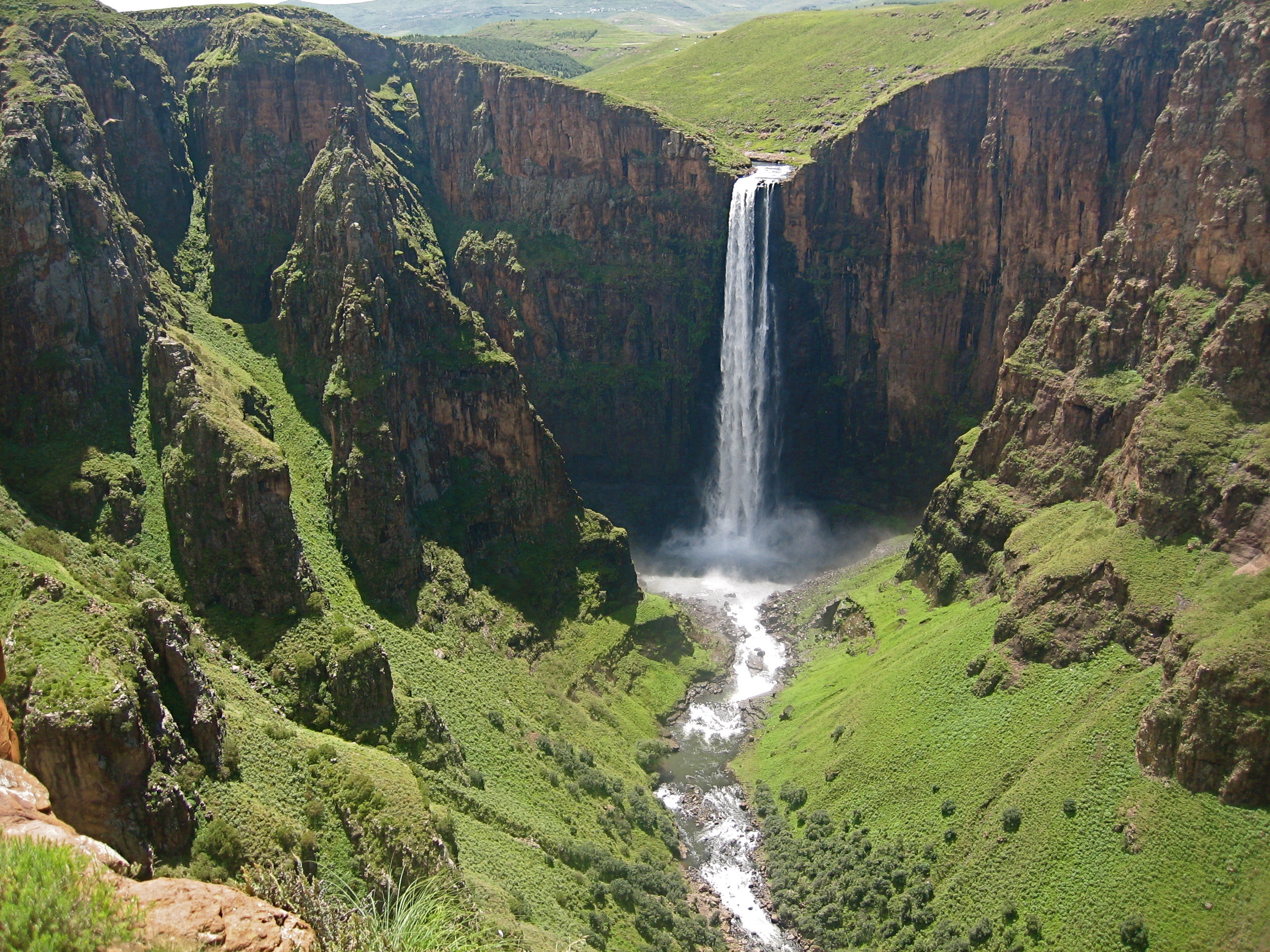
- Interactive map of Maletsunyane Falls
- Location: Lesotho
- Type: Horsetail
- Total height: 192 m (630 ft)
- Number of drops: 1
- Longest drop: 192 m (630 ft)

Location of the Maletsunyane Falls in Southern Africa

Maletsunyane Falls is a 192-metre-high (630 ft) waterfall in the Southern African country Lesotho. It is located near the town of Semonkong (Site of smoke), which is also named after the falls. The waterfall is on the Maletsunyane River and it falls from a ledge of Triassic-Jurassic basalt.

The plunging water creates a reverberating echo when it contact the basin of the falls, and local legend has it that the sound comes from the wailing of people who have drowned in the falls.

In December 2017, the Australian YouTube channel How Ridiculous broke the record for the world's highest basketball shot at Maletsunyane Falls. This record stood until May 2023, when Dude Perfect broke the record with a shot from 885ft from The Strat in Las Vegas. The Maletsunyane Falls first Guinness Record was for the "World's longest commercially operated abseil", managed by Semonkong Lodge, with a height of 204 m (669 ft).

== See also ==
- List of waterfalls
- List of waterfalls by type
