= Mortlock Football League =

Coordinates: 31°18′6.7″S 116°49′28.4″E

- Sport: Australian rules football
- First season: 1946
- No. of teams: 7
- Most recent champion: Dalwallinu (2) (2026)
- Most titles: Goomalling (25)

The Mortlock Football League is an Australian rules football competition based around 8 clubs in the south-west region of Western Australia. It is one of a number of football leagues in the wheat-belt region of WA. The eight teams represent the towns of Calingiri, Dalwallinu, Dowerin, Gingin, Goomalling, Toodyay, Wongan-Ballidu. Wyalkatchem played until the end of 2010.

Mortlock League also includes a hockey competition which involves all clubs mentioned above. Teams compete in a home and away season of 14 rounds with a number of byes and one week during the season dedicated to playing country week football against other south-western country leagues. The season ends with a finals campaign including the top 4 teams from the home and away rounds. Notable players that have been recruited from their respected towns to AFL teams include; Josh and Matthew Carr (Goomalling), Lance Franklin (Dowerin), Willie Dick (Goomalling, Ballidu), Brendan Fewster (Gingin), Mal Brown (Dowerin). Retired AFL players to have previously/currently played in the Mortlock Football League are; Michael Pettigrew, Ashley Sampi, Antoni Grover, Kepler Bradley, Greg Broughton.

== History ==
The Mortlock Football League's origins date back to the formation of the Goomalling-Dowerin Association in 1923, although organised football had been played in the district since 1904.

The Goomalling Football Association was formed at a meeting held in the Goomalling Agricultural Hall on 28 May 1904. Representatives from Dowerin, Goomalling and Mumberkine were present and the district was divided into three wards from which the teams would select their players. E. F. Edwardes was elected as President and H. Slater took on the role of Secretary. Mumberkine were premiers in the Association’s inaugural season. The Oak Park club was formed in 1905, but their lifespan proved to be a short one.

Goomalling were premiers in 1905 and 1906, before hotel proprietor T. F. Elliott provided a cup for the premier side in the Association. The 1907 season saw Dowerin, Goomalling and new side Rovers (Goomalling) compete for the Elliott Cup. Rovers, donning the colours of yellow and black, drew their players from the north side of the Goomalling-Dowerin Railway line and played at the Oak Park ground.

The known results for the 1907 season saw Goomalling defeat Rovers before Rovers later exacted revenge with a 34-point win, Goomalling overcame Dowerin, 6.9 to 3.6, Rovers outclassed Dowerin, 6.13 to 1.3, Dowerin beat Goomalling by 6.7 to 5.8 and Goomalling edged out Rovers, 5.8 to 4.6.

At the end of the season, Goomalling and Rovers were equal on points, so a play-off was scheduled, with Rovers triumphant by 13 points, 4.10 to 3.3. Captain Herb Slater and Black Tommy, both outstanding players and goal scorers, played key roles in Rovers taking out the premiership.

In 1908, Rovers were premiers once again when they defeated Goomalling by five points to retain the Elliott Cup. A derby match in July saw some 500 people in attendance as Rovers defeated Goomalling by 11 points.

In 1909, W.A.F.L. club East Perth were the guests of the Goomalling Association for a match in the region on August 21, with the visitors running out narrow 4.10 to 3.15 winners. The local competition saw Rovers achieve a hat-trick of premierships after a solid 9.10 to 4.9 win over Goomalling in the decider.

Despite good coverage of football throughout the state, the West Australian provided virtually no coverage of the 1910 Goomalling Association season. It is known, however, that Rovers won their fourth consecutive flag.

The Goomalling Association made the journey to Perth for a return fixture with East Perth in 1910. In a one-sided contest played at Loton Park, East Perth were comfortable 44 point winners, 12.12 to 5.10. Later in the season, the Goomalling Association met the Eastern Districts Association at Northam and, in wet conditions, the home side prevailed 5.8 to 1.3.

The 1911 season was rocked by the disqualification of the Rovers club on 20 July, following the off-field actions of some members of the club, including a clique supposedly led by Herbert Slater and ‘Gunner’ Hills, who ‘attempted to run the Goomalling Football Association and endeavoured to bully members of the committee into letting them have their sweet way.’ The season continued with just two clubs, with Goomalling proving far too strong for Dowerin and were crowned premiers.

The 1912 season saw the admission of the Wanderers (Goomalling) to restore a three-team competition. The Wanderers players were chiefly Karranadgin settlers, and the team chose to wear the colours of red, white and blue. Dowerin won the premiership in this season, which by now was the F. L. Rose Cup.

In 1912, The Goomalling Association wrote to the W.A.F.L. in 1912, suggesting the staging of a Country Week competition. Unfortunately, the Association was unable to raise a representative side, leaving Avon, Bunbury, Geraldton, Moora and Nelson as the first teams to participate in this competition.

In 1913, Goomalling lost only two matches all season en route to securing the premiership, ‘icing the cake’ with a 5.16 to 4.4 win over Dowerin in the Final.

In 1914, the Country Week competition included eight teams – Bunbury, Forrest, Geraldton, Goomalling, Moora, Quairading, South Suburban and Warren. The Final saw an upset six point victory for Forrest over Goomalling, 6.12 to 6.6.

The W.A.F.L. affiliated associations in 1914 were Albany, Arthur West, Bunbury, Central District, Central Murchison, Collie, Forrest, Geraldton, Goomalling, Katanning, Moora, Meekatharra, Narrogin, Nelson, South Suburban, Upper Chapman, Warren and the W.A.F.A.

There was virtually no reference to the Association in the West Australian in 1914, but it is known that Dowerin were premiers after a comprehensive 13.25 to 3.2 win over Goomalling.

The onset of the First World War meant that football was set aside until later in the decade.

In the first five seasons after World War I, five different associations were formed

1919: Central Districts FA (Goomalling, North Jennacubbine, South Jennacubbine)
1920: Goomalling-Dowerin-Jennacubbine FA (Dowerin, Goomalling, Jennacubbine)
1921: Goomalling FA (Goomalling, Karranadgin, Konnongorring)
1922: Central Districts FA (Australs, Jennacubbine, Jennapullin, Rovers)

The Goomalling-Dowerin Association was formed in 1923 and has remained intact since then (apart from a three-season World War II recess from 1942–1944). Jennacubbine won the first two premierships.

The Association was renamed as the Goomalling & Districts Association in 1925 (11 years after its predecessor disbanded) and this competition was conducted until 1941, when World War 2 forced the cessation of the competition for three seasons from 1942 to 1944.

The competing clubs from 1923 to 1941 were: Dowerin (1923–1924, 1933–1941), Goomalling (1926), Goomalling Australs (1923, 1927–1941), Goomalling Country (1925), Goomalling Rovers (1923, 1927–1941), Goomalling Town (1925 – withdrew mid season), Jennacubbine (1923–1926; 1928–1941), Konnongorring (1927; 1930; 1932–1937), Mumberkine (1932–1937), North Goomalling (1924), South Goomalling 1924), Toodyay Rangers (1931) and Wongan Hills (1925–1926; 1928–1930; 1936–1940). Rovers were the standout performers with 6 premierships, Australs, Dowerin and Jennacubbine all won 4 premierships and Wongan Hills were premiers in the inaugural season in 1925.

- 1923 Jennacubbine
- 1924 Jennacubbine
- 1925 Wongan Hills
- 1926 Jennacubbine
- 1927 Rovers
- 1928 Australs
- 1929 Rovers
- 1930 Australs
- 1931 Rovers
- 1932 Rovers
- 1933 Australs
- 1934 Jennacubbine
- 1935 Australs
- 1936 Rovers
- 1937 Dowerin
- 1938 Dowerin
- 1939 Dowerin
- 1940 Dowerin
- 1941 Rovers

The G&DFA resumed in 1945, with five clubs (Dowerin, Ejanding, Goomalling, Konnongorring and Wongan Hills) affiliating. In 1973, the league changed its name to the Mortlock National Football League.

The affiliated clubs since World War 2 have been: Ballidu (1961–1995), Bolgart (1958 –1976), Cadoux (1967–1970), Calingiri (since 1959), Dalwallinu (since 1992), Dowerin (1945–2012), Dowerin/Wyalkatchem (since 2013), Ejanding (1945–1962), Gingin (since 1973), Goomalling (since 1945), Jennacubbine (1946–1971), Konnongorring (1945-1948; 1954–1975), Toodyay (since 1960), Wongan/Ballidu (since 1996), Wongan Hills (1945–1995), Wyalkatchem (1955–1957; 1976–2010) and Yerecoin (1959).

In 1973, with the inclusion of Gingin the association changed its name to the Mortlock National Football League.

Noteworthy footballers from the Mortlock Football League that made it to elite levels of Australian rules football are the four-time All-Australian Jack Clarke (Jennacubbine), Mal Brown (Dowerin), eight-time All-Australian Lance Franklin (Dowerin), Eric "Tarzan" Glass (Goomalling), Willy Dick (Goomalling and Ballidu), Brendon Fewster (Gingin), and the brothers Josh and Matthew Carr (Goomalling).

Seven players have played at VFL/AFL level and 95 players have been recruited to the WAFL from current MFL clubs. Players to have played 50 or more WAFL games are Laurence Watson (Bolgart), Mal Brown, Ronald Brown, Murray Couper and Ian Newman (Dowerin), Brendon Fewster (Gingin), Gary Brookes, Willy Dick, Eric Glass and Charles Western (Goomalling), Jack Clarke (Jennacubbine), Anthony Beattie and Chester Mackean (Toodyay) and Ron Bayens (Wongan Hills).

The League receives good promotion in the local media and season 2014 sees the return of live football broadcasts of MFL matches after an absence of many years, thanks to Frontier Sports Media. Their weekly 'Mortlock Matchday' broadcasts can be heard via www.frontiersportsmedia.com as a live audio stream and via the TuneIn radio app.

== Clubs ==
=== Locations ===
Locations of the Mortlock FL clubs

=== Current ===
Club	Colours	Nickname	Home ground	Former League	Est.	Years in MFL	MFL Premierships	
Club	Colours	Nickname	Home ground	Former League	Est.	Years in MFL	Total	Years
Calingiri		Cougars	Calingiri Oval, Calingiri	VPFA	1920	1959–	13	1962, 1975, 1976, 1978, 1983, 1984, 1986, 1989, 1990, 1991, 2000, 2006, 2015
Dalwallinu		Bulldogs	Dalwallinu Oval, Dalwallinu	CMFL	1968	1992–	2	2017, 2026
Dowerin (Note: Known as Dowerin-Wyalkatchem from 2013–2023)		Tigers	Dowerin Oval, Dowerin	D&DFA	1903	1923–1924, 1933–	14	1937, 1938, 1939, 1940, 1947, 1972, 1982, 1985, 2005, 2008, 2010, 2012, 2013, 2021
Gingin		Eagles	Gingin Oval, Gingin	HFA	1908	1973–	5	1997, 2002, 2011, 2018, 2023
Goomalling		Blues	Goomalling Oval, Goomalling	–	1945	1945–	25	1945, 1946, 1948, 1952, 1958, 1963, 1964, 1965, 1966, 1967, 1968, 1970, 1971, 1977, 1992, 1993, 1994, 1995, 1996, 1998, 1999, 2007, 2022, 2024, 2025
Toodyay		Lions	Toodyay Oval, Toodyay	VPFA	1888	1958–	8	1961, 1973, 1974, 1980, 1988, 2004, 2014, 2019
Wongan Ballidu		Boomers	Wongan Hills Oval, Wongan Hills	–	1996	1996–	2	2009, 2016

=== Former ===
Club	Colours	Nickname	Home ground	Former League	Est.	Years in MFL	MFL Premierships		Fate
Club	Colours	Nickname	Home ground	Former League	Est.	Years in MFL	Total	Years	Fate
Australs (Goomalling)	Dark with light monogram		Goomalling Oval, Goomalling	–	1923	1923, 1927–1941	4	1928, 1930, 1933, 1935	Entered recess due to WWII
Ballidu		Bombers	Ballidu Greater Sports Council, Ballidu	D&DFA		1961–1995	2	1981, 1987	Merged with Wongan Hills in 1996 to form Wongan-Ballidu
Bolgart			Bolgart Oval, Bolgart			1958–1976	2	1960, 1969	Folded after 1976 season
Cadoux			Cadoux Oval, Cadoux	KWFA		1967–1970	0	-	Folded after 1970 season
Ejanding		Tigers		D&DFA		1945–1962	2	1955, 1957	Folded after 1962 season
Goomalling [1]			Goomalling Oval, Goomalling	–	1926	1926	0	-	De-merged into Australs and Rovers in 1927
Goomalling Country			Goomalling Oval, Goomalling	–	1925	1925	0	-	Merged with Goomalling Town to form Goomalling [1] in 1926
Goomalling Town			Goomalling Oval, Goomalling	–	1925	1925	0	-	Merged with Goomalling Country to form Goomalling [1] in 1926
Jennacubbine				CDFA		1923–1926, 1928–1941, 1946–1971, 1973–1978	6	1923, 1924, 1926, 1934, 1954, 1956	Folded after 1978 season
Konnongorring				GFA		1927, 1930, 1932–1937, 1945–1948, 1954–1975	1	1959	Folded after 1975 season
Mumberkine				GFA		1932–1937	0	-	Folded after 1937 season
North Goomalling			Goomalling Oval, Goomalling	–	1924	1924	0	-	Replaced by Goomalling Town and Goomalling Country in 1925
Rovers (Goomalling)			Goomalling Oval, Goomalling	CDFA		1923, 1927–1941	6	1927, 1929, 1931, 1932, 1936, 1941	Entered recess due to WWII
South Goomalling				–	1924	1924	0	-	Replaced by Goomalling Town and Goomalling Country in 1925
Toodyay Rangers						1931	0	-	Folded after 1931 season
Wongan Hills		Roosters	Wongan Hills Oval, Wongan Hills			1925–1926, 1928–1930, 1936–1940, 1945–1995	6	1925, 1949, 1950, 1951, 1953, 1979	Merged with Ballidu in 1996 to form Wongan-Ballidu
Wyalkatchem		Bulldogs	Wyalkatchem Oval, Wyalkatchem	WFA		1955–1957, 1976–2010	2	2001, 2003	Absorbed by Dowerin after folding in 2011
Yerecoin			Yerecoin Oval, Yerecoin			1959	0	-	Folded after 1959 season

== Grand final results ==
Year	Premiers	Score	Runners up	Score
1923	Jennacubbine	11.14 (80)	Australs	10.7 (67)
1924	Jennacubbine	5.20 (50)	North Goomalling	6.11 (47)
1925	Wongan Hills	9.10 (64)	Country (Goomalling)	4.6 (30)
1926	Jennacubbine	14.20 (104)	Wongan Hills	8.15 (63)
1927	Rovers (Goomalling)	11.11 (77)	Australs	7.8 (50)
1928	Australs	11.12 (78)	Jennacubbine	10.11 (71)
1929	Rovers (Goomalling)	13.13 (91)	Jennacubbine	8.7 (55)
1930	Australs	7.16 (58)	Rovers	7.13 (55)
1931	Rovers	14.13 (97)	Australs	11.14 (80)
1932	Rovers	9.14 (68)	Jennacubbine	7.7 (49)
1933	Australs	14.11 (95)	Rovers	14.10 (94)
1934	Jennacubbine	10.10 (70)	Rovers	9.12 (66)
1935	Australs	14.11 (95)	Rovers	8.13 (65)
1936	Rovers	9.20 (74)	Australs	6.10 (46)
1937	Dowerin	10.8 (68)	Wongan Hills	7.5 (47)
1938	Dowerin	13.26 (104)	Rovers	11.15 (81)
1939	Dowerin	13.10 (88)	Rovers	9.8 (62)
1940	Dowerin	12.6 (78)	Jennacubbine	10.12 (72)
1941	Rovers	8.8 (56)	Australs	5.9 (39)
1945	Goomalling	12.16 (88)	Dowerin	7:9 (51)
1946	Goomalling	9.7 (61)	Dowerin	4.20 (44)
1947	Dowerin	15.10 (100)	Goomalling	9.7 (61)
1948	Goomalling	8.11 (59)	Dowerin	7.7 (49)
1949	Wongan Hills	10.12 (72)	Dowerin	7.12 (54)
1950	Wongan Hills	16.17 (113)	Goomalling	8.8 (56)
1951	Wongan Hills	5.13 (43)	Dowerin	5.5 (35)
1952	Goomalling	9.8 (62); 11.11 (77)	Dowerin	9.8 (62); 10.7 (67)
1953	Wongan Hills	7.16 (58); 11.12 (78)	Ejanding	8.10 (58); 8.14 (62)
1954	Jennacubbine	8.12 (60)	Ejanding	4.10 (34)
1955	Ejanding	11.14 (80)	Dowerin	11.7 (73)
1956	Jennacubbine	10.16 (76)	Goomalling	8.9 (57)
1957	Ejanding	10.9 (69)	Goomalling	8.12 (60)
1958	Goomalling		?	
1959	Konnongorring		?	
1960	Bolgart		?	
1961	Toodyay		?	
1962	Calingiri		Bolgart	
1963	Goomalling		?	
1964	Goomalling		?	
1965	Goomalling		Jennacubbine	
1966	Goomalling		Ballidu	
1967	Goomalling	16.22 (118)	Konongorring	8.4 (52)
1968	Goomalling	17.20 (122)	Wongan Hills	9.13 (67)
1969	Bolgart	18.16 (124)	Calingiri	9.17 (71)
1970	Goomalling	23.17 (155)	Bolgart	13.9 (87)
1971	Goomalling	15.15 (105)	Toodyay	9.12 (66)
1972	Dowerin	11.18 (84)	Wongan Hills	5.14 (44)
1973	Toodyay	15.19 (109)	Dowerin	9.9 (63)
1974	Toodyay	21.21 (147)	Dowerin	17.10 (112)
1975	Calingiri	15.19 (109)	Dowerin	9.5 (59)
1976	Calingiri	9.7 (61)	Goomalling	3.14 (32)
1977	Goomalling	15.12 (102)	Gingin	8.14 (62)
1978	Calingiri	19.16 (130)	Gingin	7.13 (55)
1979	Wongan Hills	24.11 (155)	Dowerin	9.18 (72)
1980	Toodyay	13.4 (82)	Dowerin	10.20 (80)
1981	Ballidu	13.24 (102)	Dowerin	9.14 (68)
1982	Dowerin	13.16 (94)	Wongan Hills	14.4 (88)
1983	Calingiri	19.14 (128)	Dowerin	15.22 (112)
1984	Calingiri	16.23 (119)	Dowerin	14.12 (96)
1985	Dowerin	19.3 (117)	Calingiri	14.11 (95)
1986	Calingiri	15.14 (104)	Gingin	9.6 (60)
1987	Ballidu	16.9 (105)	Wongan Hills	11.11 (77)
1988	Toodyay	13.13 (91)	Dowerin	11.17 (83)
1989	Calingiri	17.14 (116)	Wongan Hills	9.8 (62)
1990	Calingiri	8.17 (65)	Goomalling	8.13 (61)
1991	Calingiri	14.17 (101)	Goomalling	10.10 (70)
1992	Goomalling	14.12 (96)	Wongan Hills	14.6 (90)
1993	Goomalling	22.8 (140)	Dowerin	14.8 (92)
1994	Goomalling	14.17 (101)	Wongan Hills	10.6 (66)
1995	Goomalling	10.13 (73)	Toodyay	9.11 (65)
1996	Goomalling	17.11 (113)	Toodyay	6.8 (44)
1997	Gingin	14.17 (101)	Goomalling	9.10 (64)
1998	Goomalling	14.11 (95)	Dalwallinu	11.8 (74)
1999	Goomalling	13.12 (90)	Wyalkatchem	13.11 (89)
2000	Calingiri	13.18 (96)	Wyalkatchem	14.11 (95)
2001	Wyalkatchem	12.10 (82)	Calingiri	11.12 (78)
2002	Gingin	13.9 (87)	Goomalling	6.14 (50)
2003	Wyalkatchem	13.12 (90)	Toodyay	6.7 (43)
2004	Toodyay	17.9 (111)	Calingiri	14.8 (92)
2005	Dowerin	15.14 (104)	Calingiri	9.7 (61)
2006	Calingiri	12.7 (79)	Gingin	11.10 (76)
2007	Goomalling	27.10 (172)	Dowerin	16.12 (108)
2008	Dowerin	15.9 (99)	Calingiri	12.13 (85)
2009	Wongan-Ballidu	19.17 (131)	Goomalling	16.8 (104)
2010	Dowerin	12.9 (81)	Gingin	12.6 (78)
2011	Gingin	16.12 (108)	Toodyay	9.9 (63)
2012	Dowerin	15.5 (95)	Toodyay	10.14 (74)
2013	Dowerin-Wyalkatchem	16.9 (105)	Calingiri	11.13 (79)
2014	Toodyay	12.14 (86)	Calingiri	10.14 (74)
2015	Calingiri	18.18 (126)	Dalwallinu	6.7 (43)
2016	Wongan-Ballidu	17.10 (112)	Dalwallinu	6.8 (44)
2017	Dalwallinu	19.12 (126)	Toodyay	11.10 (76)
2018	Gingin	23.7 (145)	Dalwallinu	10.9 (69)
2019	Toodyay	11.11 (77)	Goomalling	11.9 (75)
2021	Dowerin-Wyalkatchem	14.6 (90)	Goomalling	8.13 (61)
2022	Goomalling	9.14 (68)	Gingin	7.12 (54)
2023	Gingin	15.13 (103)	Goomalling	9.14 (68)
2024	Goomalling	13.11 (89)	Dowerin-Wyalkatchem	10.11 (71)
2025	Goomalling	7.5 (47)	Calingiri	1.3 (9)
2026	Dalwallinu	12.9 (81)	Toodyay	8.10 (58)

== Fairest and best (Boekeman Medal) ==
League
Known as Jones Medal in the mid 1950's, Mortlock Medal in the 1970s and Boekeman Medal since 1991

Year	Winner
1925	P. Dick (Country?)
1927	Alf Smith (Goomalling)
1931	P. Dick (Goomalling)
1935	J. Patten (Dowerin)
1936	M. Curley (Konnongorring)
1938	G. Stickland (Wongan Hills)
1939	Dick Leeson
1940	Matt Clarke (Australs)
1941	N. Cunningham (Australs)
1945	Lionel Walley (Goomalling)
1946	Gilbert Jones (Ejanding)
1947	Richard Smith (Goomalling)
1948	Richard Smith (Goomalling)
1949	Arnold ‘Bud’ Byfield (Wongan Hills)
1950	Lionel Walley (Goomalling)
1951	Tony Leeson (Jennacubbine)
1952	Linton Smith (Goomalling)
1953	Paul White
1954	Tony Leeson (Jennacubbine)
1955	D. Whalley (Konnongorring)
1956	Bob Leeson (Jennacubbine)
1957	Alfie Powell (Goomalling)
1958	Bob Leeson (Jennacubbine)
1959	Aub King (Calingiri)
1960	Aub King (Calingiri)
1961	Vern Nylander (Toodyay)
1962	Doug Dick (Goomalling)
1963	Terry Bowen (Jennacubbine)
1964	Wally Brown (Ballidu)
1965	Ray Morrell (Ballidu)
1966	Bruce Stitt (Ballidu)
1967	Brian Westlake (Calingiri)
1968	Bruce Stitt (Ballidu)
1969	Bruce Stitt (Ballidu)
1970	Denis Lord
1971	Brian Westlake (Calingiri)
1972	Brian Westlake (Calingiri)
1973	Stroud Dale (Toodyay)
1974	Phil Mincherton (Ballidu)
1975	Danny Jones (Wongan Hills)
1976	Phil Mincherton (Ballidu)
1977	Mark Foxon (Gingin)
1978	Hedley Dewar (Gingin)
1979	Dexter Davies (Wyalkatchem)
1980	Phil Mincherton (Ballidu)
1981	Phil Mincherton (Ballidu)
1982	Phil Mincherton (Ballidu)
1983	Phil King (Dowerin)
1984	Derek Headland (Ballidu)
1985	Mal Bennett (Wongan Hills)
1986	Craig Watson (Gingin)
1987	Chris Lee (Dowerin)
1988	Chris Lee (Dowerin)
1989	Bevan King (Calingiri)
1990	Craig Watson (Gingin)
1991	Bevan King (Calingiri)
1992	Glen Fletcher (Gingin)
1993	Damien Leeson (Goomalling)
1994	Mal Bennett (Wongan Hills)
1995	Dale Warren (Goomalling)
1996	Nick Howat (Toodyay)
1997	Cheyne Tourner (Wyalkatchem)
1998	Robbie Dreghorn (Dowerin)
1999	Greg Wootton (Wongan/Ballidu)
2000	Chad Boucher (Calingiri)
2001	Troy Foote (Wyalkatchem)
2002	Michael Davey (Goomalling)
2003	Michael Davey (Goomalling)
2004	Nicholas Smith (Calingiri)
2005	Paul Fewster (Gingin)
2006	Matthew Borgward (Wyalkatchem)
2007	Greg Woods (Goomalling)
2008	Craig Wilson (Dowerin)
2009	Adam Pearce (Toodyay)
2010	Brad McNeill (Dalwallinu)
2011	Dean Trewhella (Dowerin)
2012	Dean Trewhella (Dowerin)
2013	Dean Trewhella (Dowerin/Wyalkatchem) & Geoffrey Rouse (Gingin)
2014	Kyle Martin (Goomalling)
2015	Corey Hutchings (Toodyay)
2016	Dane Crognale (Wongan-Ballidu)
2017	Ben Jenkins (Toodyay)
2018	Ben Whitsed (Dowerin-Wyalkatchem)
2019	Dylan Burgess (Toodyay)

Reserves

Year	Winner
2000	Klint Hagboom (Dowerin)
2001	Blake Hagboom (Dowerin)
2002	Graeme Taylor (Goomalling)
2003	Joel Gomersall (Gingin)
2004	Craig Whyte (Dalwallinu)
2005	Scott Flavel (Dowerin)
2006	Rhys Allsop (Dowerin) & Mark McComish (Gingin)
2007	Kyhe McKenna (Dowerin)
2008	Corey Higgins (Toodyay)
2009	Garth King (Dowerin)
2010	Chad McKay (Dalwallinu)
2011	Chad Hagboom (Dowerin)
2012	Jason Gard (Dowerin)

== Player of the year (Bendigo Bank Award) ==
- 2007 Craig Wilson (Dowerin)
- 2008 Dean Trewhella (Dowerin)
- 2009
- 2010 Brad McNeill (Dalwallinu)
- 2011 Rheece Bartel (Gingin)
- 2012 Rheece Bartel (Gingin)

== Leading goalkicker (Lyndon Bird Award) ==
League

- 2000
- 2001
- 2002
- 2003 Justin Kiely (Wyalkatchem) 62 goals
- 2004 Phil Brookes (Dalwallinu) 62 goals
- 2005 Daniel King (Calingiri)
- 2006 Michael Potts (Gingin) 83 goals
- 2007 Samuel Stanton (Toodyay)76 goals
- 2008 Jay Betts (Toodyay) 87 goals
- 2009 David Wilson (Dowerin) 62 goals
- 2010 David Wilson (Dowerin) 56 goals
- 2011 Geoffrey Rouse (Gingin) 83 goals
- 2012 Geoffrey Rouse (Gingin) 99 goals
- 2013 Geoffrey Rouse (Gingin) 101 goals

== Ladders ==
=== 2011 ladder ===
Mortlock	Wins	Byes	Losses	Draws	For	Against	%	Pts
Gingin	12	2	0	0	1413	629	224.64%	56
Toodyay	9	2	3	0	1253	873	143.53%	44
Dowerin	9	2	3	0	1038	917	113.20%	44
Dalwallinu	4	2	8	0	983	1043	94.25%	24
Goomalling	4	2	8	0	924	1178	78.44%	24
Wondan Hill/Ballidu	2	2	10	0	905	1322	68.46%	16
Calingiri	2	2	10	0	724	1278	56.65%	16

Finals

Final	Team	G	B	Pts	Team	G	B	Pts
1st semi	Dowerin	17	7	109	Dalwallinu	12	6	78
2nd semi	Gingin	18	16	124	Toodyay	9	12	66
Preliminary	Toodyay	14	12	96	Dowerin	5	15	45
Grand	Gingin	16	12	108	Toodyay	9	9	63

=== 2012 ladder ===
Mortlock	Wins	Byes	Losses	Draws	For	Against	%	Pts	Final	Team	G	B	Pts	Team	G	B	Pts
Toodyay	11	0	3	0	1458	681	214.10%	44	1st semi	Dowerin	13	14	92	Wondan Hill/Ballidu	11	10	76
Gingin	11	0	3	0	1664	783	212.52%	44	2nd semi	Toodyay	16	7	103	Gingin	15	8	98
Dowerin	11	0	3	0	1529	878	174.15%	44	Preliminary	Dowerin	11	10	76	Gingin	9	16	70
Wondan Hill/Ballidu	8	0	6	0	1333	1132	117.76%	32	Grand	Dowerin	15	5	95	Toodyay	10	14	74
Goomalling	6	0	8	0	1199	1296	92.52%	24									
Dalwallinu	2	0	12	0	856	1487	57.57%	8									
Calingiri	0	0	14	0	495	2277	21.74%	0									

=== 2013 ladder ===
Mortlock	Wins	Byes	Losses	Draws	For	Against	%	Pts	Final	Team	G	B	Pts	Team	G	B	Pts
Calingiri	10	0	4	0	1598	1045	152.92%	40	1st semi	Wondan Hill/Ballidu	20	10	130	Gingin	6	6	42
Dowerin	10	0	4	0	1368	1142	119.79%	40	2nd semi	Calingiri	13	16	94	Dowerin	11	10	76
Gingin	9	0	5	0	1588	895	177.43%	36	Preliminary	Dowerin	14	10	94	Wondan Hill/Ballidu	8	12	60
Wondan Hill/Ballidu	9	0	5	0	1269	1087	116.74%	36	Grand	Dowerin	16	9	105	Calingiri	11	13	79
Toodyay	8	0	6	0	1300	1092	119.05%	32									
Dalwallinu	2	0	12	0	671	1615	41.55%	8									
Goomalling	1	0	13	0	820	1738	47.18%	4									

=== 2014 ladder ===
Mortlock	Wins	Byes	Losses	Draws	For	Against	%	Pts	Final	Team	G	B	Pts	Team	G	B	Pts
Calingiri	11	0	3	0	1622	966	167.91%	44	1st semi	Gingin	14	10	94	Dowerin	8	10	58
Toodyay	11	0	3	0	1486	964	154.15%	44	2nd semi	Calingiri	16	9	105	Toodyay	12	7	79
Gingin	10	0	4	0	1483	1080	137.31%	40	Preliminary	Toodyay	19	12	126	Gingin	13	15	93
Dowerin/Wylie	7	0	7	0	1190	1080	110.19%	28	Grand	Toodyay	12	14	86	Calingiri	10	14	74
Goomalling	6	0	8	0	1073	1201	89.34%	24									
Dalwallinu	4	0	10	0	880	1295	67.95%	16									
Wondan Hill/Ballidu	0	0	14	0	708	1856	38.15%	0									

=== 2015 ladder ===
Mortlock	Wins	Byes	Losses	Draws	For	Against	%	Pts	Final	Team	G	B	Pts	Team	G	B	Pts
Toodyay	11	0	3	0	1451	1212	119.72%	44	1st semi	Dalwallinu	18	15	123	Dowerin	12	4	76
Calingiri	9	0	5	0	1581	1066	148.31%	36	2nd semi	Calingiri	20	20	140	Toodyay	9	12	66
Dowerin/Wylie	8	0	6	0	1434	956	150.00%	32	Preliminary	Dalwallinu	18	5	113	Toodyay	11	14	80
Dalwallinu	8	0	6	0	1159	1111	104.32%	32	Grand	Calingiri	18	18	126	Dalwallinu	6	7	43
Gingin	7	0	7	0	1150	947	121.44%	28									
Goomalling	6	0	8	0	1239	1221	101.47%	24									
Wondan Hill/Ballidu	0	0	14	0	651	2152	30.25%	0									

=== 2016 ladder ===
Mortlock	Wins	Byes	Losses	Draws	For	Against	%	Pts	Final	Team	G	B	Pts	Team	G	B	Pts
Wondan Hill/Ballidu	14	0	0	0	1815	923	196.64%	56	1st semi	Dowerin	12	11	83	Goomalling	9	11	65
Dalwallinu	11	0	3	0	1613	887	181.85%	44	2nd semi	Wongan	10	12	72	Dalwallinu	9	10	64
Dowerin/Wylie	9	0	5	0	1280	981	130.48%	36	Preliminary	Dalwallinu	16	17	113	Dowerin	9	9	63
Goomalling	7	0	7	0	1533	1108	138.36%	28	Grand	Wongan	17	10	112	Dalwallinu	6	8	44
Gingin	6	0	8	0	1170	1117	104.74%	24									
Toodyay	2	0	12	0	912	1658	55.01%	8									
Calingiri	0	0	14	0	726	2375	30.57%	0									

=== 2017 ladder ===
Mortlock	Wins	Byes	Losses	Draws	For	Against	%	Pts	Final	Team	G	B	Pts	Team	G	B	Pts
Dalwallinu	11	0	3	0	1640	777	211.07%	44	1st semi	Toodyay	15	15	105	Gingin	14	10	94
Wondan Hill/Ballidu	11	0	3	0	1524	870	175.17%	44	2nd semi	Dalwallinu	21	17	143	Wongan	12	7	79
Toodyay	11	0	3	0	1622	941	172.37%	44	Preliminary	Toodyay	17	8	110	Wongan	14	12	96
Gingin	7	0	7	0	1110	1130	98.23%	28	Grand	Dalwallinu	19	12	126	Toodyay	11	10	76
Dowerin/Wylie	4	0	10	0	959	1443	66.46%	16									
Calingiri	3	0	11	0	979	1557	62.88%	12									
Goomalling	2	0	12	0	827	1943	42.56%	8									
