= Schwarzwald-Baar-Center =

Large mall in Villingen-Schwenningen, Germany

Coordinates: 48.082045°N 8.4968967°E

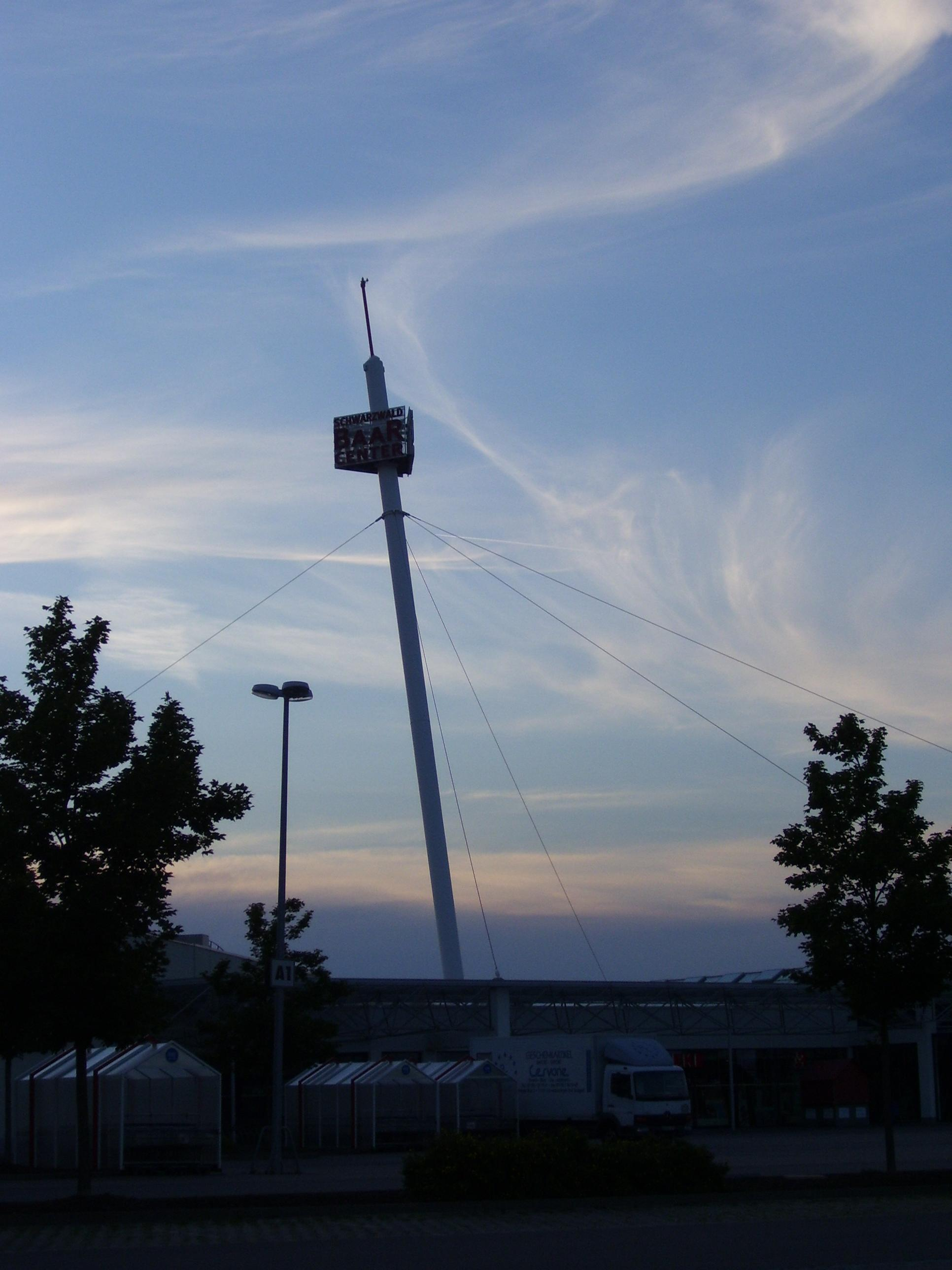
Tower carrying roof of Schwarzwald-Baar-Center

Schwarzwald-Baar-Center is a large mall in Villingen-Schwenningen, Germany. It has a striking architecture as its roof is carried by an inclined tower with its name and which is also equipped with a flight safety lamp. Schwarzwald-Baar-Center was opened on September 28, 2000 and houses 35 stores.

== See also ==
Schwarzwald-Baar Center Website
