= Zadko Observatory =

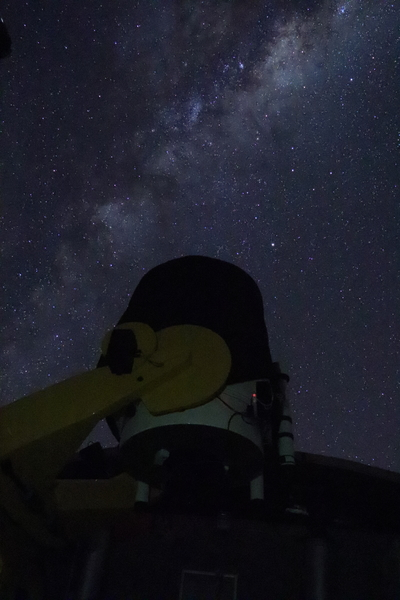
- Organization: University of Western Australia
- Observatory code: D20
- Location: Gingin, Western Australia, Shire of Gingin, Australia
- Coordinates: 31°21′31.4″S 115°42′47.2″E
- Altitude: 50 m (160 ft)
- Website: www.zadko-observatory.org

Telescopes
- Zadko Telescope: 1.0 m reflector
- C14: reflector

Zadko Observatory is an astronomical observatory (obs. code: D20) located within the Wallingup Plain in the Gingin shire, Western Australia. It is owned and operated by the University of Western Australia.

== History ==
The Zadko Observatory was created in 2008 to host the Zadko Telescope, a 1.0m instrument donated to the University of Western Australia by James Zadko, CEO of Claire Energy. It was then expanded to fit several other instruments in 2011. The Observatory is located close to the Australian Interferometer Gravitational Observatory. The original construction cost AUD 1 million.

Observations are performed robotically every night, and have led to various important results, such as the observation of the first detected counterpart of a gravitational wave source, GW170817.

== Instruments ==
The observatory operates one robotic 1.0-metre Cassegrain telescope for scientific studies. In addition, the observatory hosts several instruments operated by private companies.

== See also ==
- List of astronomical observatories
