= Gravitational Wave International Committee =

- Abbreviation: GWIC
- Formation: 1997; 29 years ago
- Region served: Worldwide
- Official language: English
- Website: GWIC Official website

The Gravitational Wave International Committee (or GWIC) is a panel of gravitational wave detection Laboratory or Observatory directors that promotes cooperation and collaboration between the gravitational wave detector projects and provides direction and advice on the future development of the field. Barry Barish founded the GWIC in 1997 and served as the chair from 1997-2003.

== Mission ==
The mission of GWIC is to facilitate international collaboration and cooperation in the construction, operation and use of the major gravitational wave detection facilities worldwide:

- Promote international cooperation in all phases of construction and scientific exploitation of gravitational-wave detectors;
- Coordinate and support long-range planning for new instrument proposals, or proposals for instrument upgrades;
- Promote the development of gravitational-wave detection as an astronomical tool, exploiting especially the potential for multi-messenger astrophysics;
- Organize regular, world-inclusive meetings and workshops for the study of problems related to the development and exploitation of new or enhanced gravitational-wave detectors, and foster research and development of new technology;
- Represent the gravitational-wave detection community internationally, acting as its advocate;
- Provide a forum for project leaders to regularly meet, discuss, and jointly plan the operations and direction of their detectors and experimental gravitational-wave physics generally.

== Relationship to other Organizations ==
GWIC is affiliated with the International Union of Pure and Applied Physics (IUPAP) as its Working Group 11 (WG11). In 1999, GWIC was adopted by an earlier IUPAP Working Group, the Particle and Nuclear Astrophysics and Gravitation International Committee (PaNAGIC). PaNAGIC was created to support international exchange of ideas and to support the convergence of the international scientific community with respect to large-scale activities on particle and nuclear astrophysics, gravitation and cosmology. It adopted GWIC as a sub-panel specializing in gravitational waves. PaNAGIC was dissolved by IUPAP in 2011, but the important role of GWIC was recognized and it was promoted to full Working Group status.

GWIC also works with the International Society on General Relativity and Gravitation (ISGRG) in some areas. ISGRG is an Affiliated Commission of IUPAP (designated AC2). The main scientific meetings of GWIC (the Amaldi Meeting on Gravitational Waves) and ISGRG (the GRxx series of conferences) were held together in Sydney in 2007 and will be held together again in Warsaw in 2013. The ISGRG also administers the GWIC Thesis Prize funds. The membership of GWIC includes a representative from ISGRG to ensure communication between the two organizations.

== Activities ==
=== Amaldi Conferences on Gravitational Waves ===
The Edoardo Amaldi Conference series on Gravitational Waves is coordinated by GWIC as the cornerstone conference for the Gravitational Wave Detection community worldwide. These conferences are held every two years, and move around the world to locations where gravitational wave research is active.

=== GWIC Thesis Prize ===
GWIC awards a prize for an outstanding PhD thesis on any aspect of gravitational waves science. First awarded as a biennial award open to LIGO Scientific Collaboration members, it is now an annual award open to the broader gravitational wave science field. A summary article of the research of past winners is found on the 2Physics blog .

=== Roadmap ===
In June 2010, GWIC released a document detailing a strategic roadmap for the gravitational wave astronomy field for the next 30 years . This roadmap sets out recommended priorities for developing current projects and initiating new detectors based on scientific opportunities. The goal of the roadmap is to

serve the international gravitational wave community and its stake-holders as a tool for the development of capabilities and facilities needed to address the exciting scientific opportunities on the intermediate and long-term horizons.

=== Statements ===
In order to aid funding agencies to see the significance of proposals (either continuing existing projects or initiating new projects), GWIC may issue statements to indicate international support and consensus among the gravitational wave detection field. Statements or letters are issued if GWIC reaches a strong consensus, and "such statements carry the full backing of the leaders of the projects represented on GWIC ."

In 2010, GWIC released statements supporting the expansion of the interferometric detector network through the IndIGO, LIGO-Australia, and LCGT projects.

== Member Projects ==
GWIC members are representatives from all established gravitational wave detector projects. Including ground- and space-based interferometric detectors, resonant mass detectors, spacecraft Doppler tracking and pulsar timing. As of October 2012, the committee consists of 23 members from 15 projects or communities.

Projects Represented
ACIGA
AURIGA
Einstein Telescope
EXPLORER/NAUTILUS
European Pulsar Timing Array
GEO 600
IndIGO
KAGRA
LIGO, LSC
LISA Community
NANOGrav
PPTA
Spherical Detectors
VIRGO
Theory Community/ ISGRG
