= GDC Observatory =

Astronomical observatory in Australia

Coordinates: 31.3562°S 115.7127°E

The GDC Observatory is an astronomical observatory dedicated to the exploration and science of the night sky. Located in Gingin, Western Australia, the observatory is a part of the Gingin Gravity Precinct. The Observatory is open to the public on a regular basis.

== Southern Cross Cosmos Centre ==
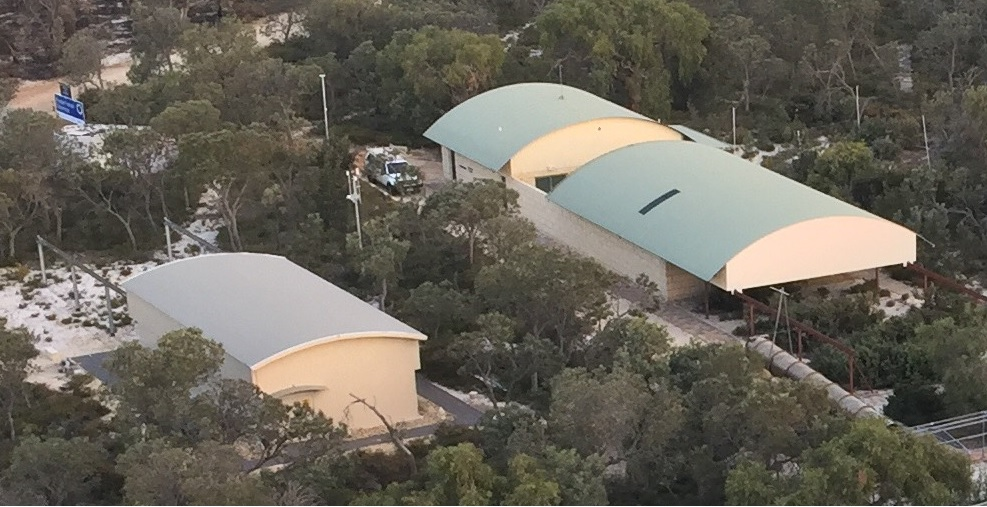
Southern Cross Cosmos Centre (right) and Zadko Telescope Facility (left)

The observatory is located in the Southern Cross Cosmos Centre, a purpose built facility opened in 2001, with a slide-off roof housing five telescopes available for public use on astronomical viewing nights.

The largest telescope is a 25-inch (640 mm) Obsession telescope named "Brodie-Hall", donated to the observatory by Laurence and Jean Brodie-Hall.

The facility is located next-door to the Zadko telescope run by the University of Western Australia, which is actively involved in scientific research.

== See also ==
- List of astronomical observatories
- List of astronomical societies
- Lists of telescopes
