= World's Longest Putt =

== World's Longest Putt ==
World’s Longest Putt
Tournament information
| Location | United States |
| Course(s) | Baths of Blackwolf Run (Finals) |
| Format | Long-distance putting competition |
Current champion
Darrell Beall (2024)

The World’s Longest Putt (WLP) is an annual long-distance golf putting competition held in the United States. First contested as a single regional event in 2023, it expanded in 2024 to include local qualifiers and regional tournaments across more than 20 states, culminating in a multi-round World Finals in Kohler, Wisconsin. The competition is organized by World Golf Events, LLC and challenges participants to sink exceptionally long putts under standardized tournament conditions.

=== History ===
The concept for WLP was developed in 2022 by Jay Stocki and Chris Carriveau, who sought to create a putting competition analogous to existing long-drive events. The inaugural Midwest regional event took place in August 2023. Following positive reception and increasing participation, WLP added local qualifiers and regional tournaments in 2024.

=== Champions ===
- 2023 – Mike Born won the World Finals at Kohler, Wisconsin, recording the lowest aggregate distance among finalists.
- 2024 – Darrell Beall won the World Finals at Kohler, Wisconsin, recording the lowest aggregate distance of 77' 0.5".

=== Notable Records ===
During a 2023 post-competition exhibition, co-founder Jay Stocki holed a 401.26 ft putt, setting the Guinness World Record for the longest golf putt ever made.

=== Organization ===
WLP is produced by World Golf Events, LLC, based in Chicago, Illinois. Founding organizers include Jay Stocki, Chris Carriveau, Michael Guerrieri, Tim Radigan, Dan Roberts, Bill Grant, Jeff Bell, and Mike Born.

=== Format and Rules ===
WLP features a three-tiered structure:

Local qualifiers – Hosted by golf courses, charity fundraisers, and golf events. Each venue sets a single long-distance putt, typically branded as a “19th hole,” where competitors take one attempt in rotation.

Regional events – Held at designated courses nationwide. Competitors face multiple putting holes (usually 50–120 ft in length) and receive three to five attempts per hole; the best two to four attempts count toward a cumulative distance score. The lowest aggregate distance determines the regional champion.

World Finals – Since 2023 held at the Baths of Blackwolf Run in Kohler, Wisconsin. The Finals comprise four rounds on different holes; each competitor is allotted seven putts per hole, with their five best counting toward the final score.

All events require use of USGA-approved putters and golf balls and are officiated by certified golf professionals to ensure compliance with tournament rules and fair play.
