= ACIGA =

The Australian Consortium for Interferometric Gravitational Astronomy (ACIGA) is a collaboration of Australian research institutions involved in the international gravitational wave research community.

The institutions associated with ACIGA are:

- The Australian National University
- University of Western Australia
- University of Adelaide
- Monash University
- University of Melbourne
- CSIRO optical technology group
- Charles Sturt University

== See also ==
- AIGO
