= Gingin, Western Australia =

Gingin
- Town
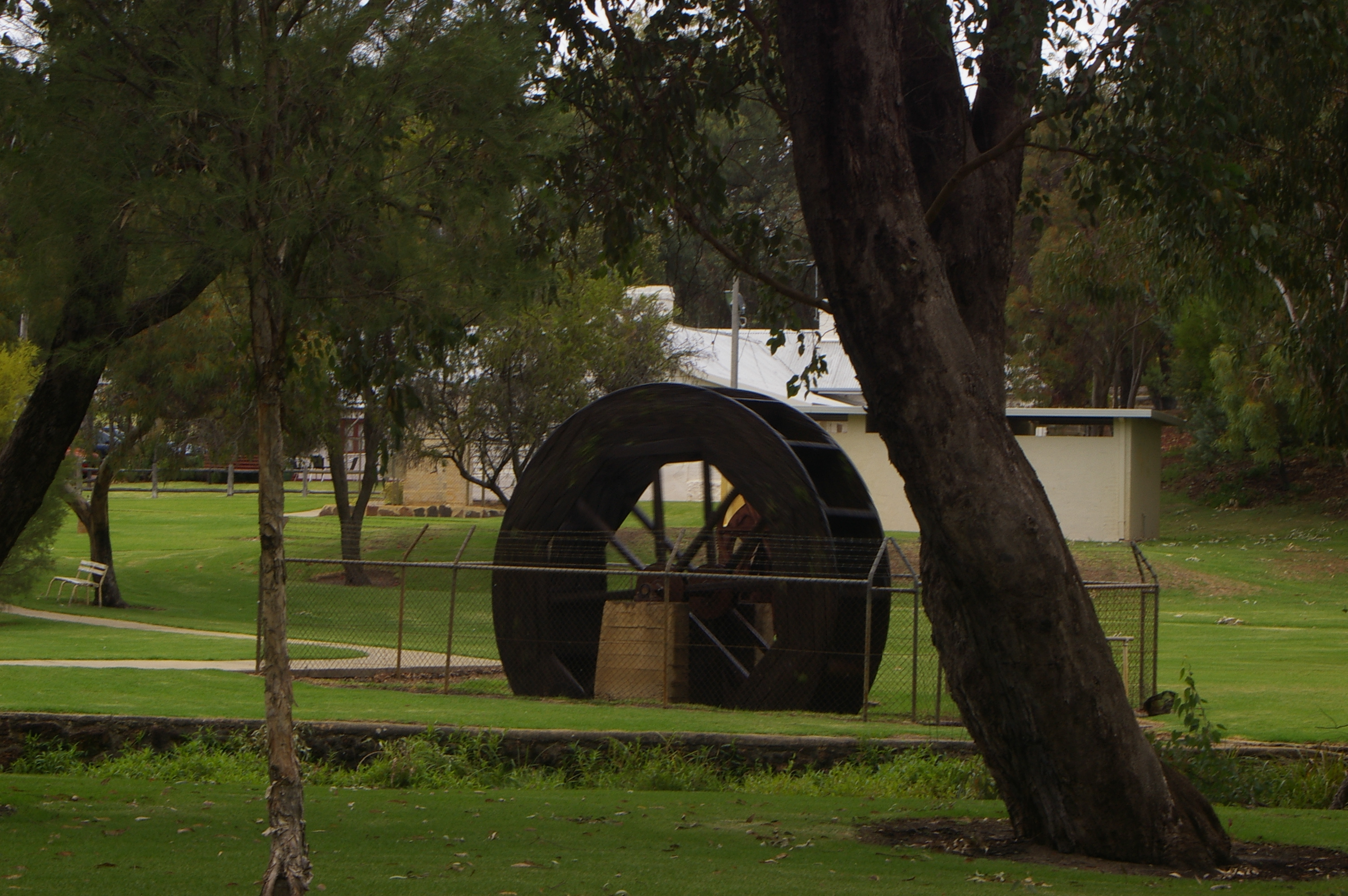
- Water Wheel in Gingin park, from the original flour mill in Gingin

- Interactive map of Gingin
- Coordinates: 31.34°S 115.91°E
- Country: Australia
- State: Western Australia
- LGA: Shire of Gingin
- Location: 67 km (42 mi) NNE of Perth; 34 km (21 mi) NE of Yanchep; 65 km (40 mi) SE of Lancelin
- Established: 1883 (town declared)

Government
  - State electorate: Moore
  - Federal division: Durack

Area
  - Total: 9.5 km^{2} (3.7 sq mi)
- Elevation: 73 m (240 ft)

Population
  - Total: 902 (SAL 2021)
- Postcode: 6503
- Mean max temp: 25.7 °C (78.3 °F)
- Mean min temp: 11.2 °C (52.2 °F)
- Annual rainfall: 633.6 mm (24.94 in)

Gingin is a town in Western Australia, located on the Brand Highway 67 kilometres (42 mi) north of Perth. It is the council seat for the Shire of Gingin local government area. Gingin had a population of 902 at the 2021 census. The town's economy is mostly based on its agriculture, although there has been an increasing focus on science with the establishment of the Australian International Gravitational Observatory and Gravity Discovery Centre. There is also a small military airfield, RAAF Gingin, located nearby.

== History ==
The first European to visit the area was the explorer George Fletcher Moore; he arrived in 1836 and recorded the Aboriginal name "Jinjin" on his charts.

The first property to be established in the area by William Locke Brockman in 1841 was named Gingin station. The meaning of the word Gingin is uncertain but is thought to mean "footprint" or "place of many streams".

A townsite, Granville, was established close by in 1839 but once Gingin was gazetted in 1871 Granville was never developed.

By 1853 an area along Gingin Brook was fenced for horses to rest on the way from Perth to Geraldton and a police station was built nearby.

Construction of the telegraph line between Gingin and Perth was completed in 1886, and the Midland railway line was completed in 1891. Gingin was declared a town in 1883.

In April 1980, a deviation of the town by the Brand Highway opened.

== Economy ==
The town is well suited for agriculture with a mild climate and available water sources. The area supports many forms of farming including beef cattle, cereal crops, olives, oranges and mangoes.

In 2003, plans were unveiled to construct the Gravity Discovery Centre near Gingin adjacent to the existing Australian International Gravitational Observatory. (AGIO) It is part of a worldwide array of observatories, completing the southern arm of the array to obtain three-dimensional measurements of gravitational waves. The public arm of AIGO, The Gravity Discovery Centre; includes a 45 m tower that leans at an angle of 15 degrees that allows students to complete free fall experiments.

In 2006 the Zadko telescope, a robotic optical telescope, was installed into the 'Zadko Dome' near the Gravitational Observatory. The Zadko telescope is used for research on a worldwide scale, scanning the sky for potentially hazardous asteroids, and can be accessed remotely via the internet. It is a joint resource for the International Centre for Radio Astronomy Research. It is an equatorial fork-mounted Cassegrain reflector telescope with a primary mirror aperture of 1.007 m and a focal length of 4.0386 m. The telescope's optical design is a hybrid Ritchey-Chrétien.

Gingin is host to the annual British Car Day, held on the third Sunday of May. Gingin's Australian rules football club plays in the Mortlock Football League.

== In popular culture ==
In 2025 the town featured in Australian television series Run on the Postcard Bandit. In 2026 it was a location for Netflix series Breakers.

== Geography ==
=== Climate ===
Garden Island has a hot-summer mediterranean climate (Köppen: Csa); with warm to hot, dry summers and mild, wet winters. Extreme temperatures ranged from 46.3 °C (115.3 °F) on 26 February 1997 to −3.7 °C (25.3 °F) on 5 July 2010. The wettest recorded day was 23 January 1999 with 95.0 mm (3.74 in) of rainfall.

Climate data for Gingin Aero (31.46°S 115.86°E) (73 m (240 ft) AMSL) (1996-2025)
Month	Jan	Feb	Mar	Apr	May	Jun	Jul	Aug	Sep	Oct	Nov	Dec	Year
Record high °C (°F)	44.6 (112.3)	46.3 (115.3)	43.0 (109.4)	40.1 (104.2)	34.8 (94.6)	28.4 (83.1)	25.8 (78.4)	30.9 (87.6)	35.2 (95.4)	39.3 (102.7)	43.0 (109.4)	45.3 (113.5)	46.3 (115.3)
Mean daily maximum °C (°F)	33.3 (91.9)	33.3 (91.9)	30.9 (87.6)	26.8 (80.2)	22.9 (73.2)	19.6 (67.3)	18.4 (65.1)	19.1 (66.4)	21.0 (69.8)	24.4 (75.9)	28.1 (82.6)	31.1 (88.0)	25.7 (78.3)
Mean daily minimum °C (°F)	16.6 (61.9)	17.0 (62.6)	15.4 (59.7)	12.1 (53.8)	9.0 (48.2)	7.3 (45.1)	6.6 (43.9)	6.6 (43.9)	7.5 (45.5)	9.2 (48.6)	12.1 (53.8)	14.6 (58.3)	11.2 (52.1)
Record low °C (°F)	5.7 (42.3)	6.6 (43.9)	2.0 (35.6)	1.8 (35.2)	−2.2 (28.0)	−3.6 (25.5)	−3.7 (25.3)	−2.3 (27.9)	−1.5 (29.3)	−0.1 (31.8)	0.7 (33.3)	2.2 (36.0)	−3.7 (25.3)
Average precipitation mm (inches)	13.7 (0.54)	13.5 (0.53)	17.6 (0.69)	26.9 (1.06)	71.2 (2.80)	109.9 (4.33)	128.6 (5.06)	111.9 (4.41)	74.0 (2.91)	34.0 (1.34)	18.7 (0.74)	8.6 (0.34)	633.6 (24.94)
Average precipitation days (≥ 0.2 mm)	2.1	1.9	4.0	6.0	10.4	13.6	17.0	15.0	13.5	8.4	5.0	2.8	99.7
Average afternoon relative humidity (%)	33	33	35	43	49	56	58	55	53	46	39	35	45
Average dew point °C (°F)	10.6 (51.1)	11.1 (52.0)	10.3 (50.5)	10.6 (51.1)	9.3 (48.7)	8.8 (47.8)	8.1 (46.6)	7.7 (45.9)	8.2 (46.8)	8.9 (48.0)	9.2 (48.6)	9.8 (49.6)	9.4 (48.9)
Source: Bureau of Meteorology (1996-2025)

=== Transport ===
Gingin is served by Transwa coaches.

== See also ==
- List of reduplicated Australian place names
