= Paige Spiranac =

American golfer and model (born 1993)

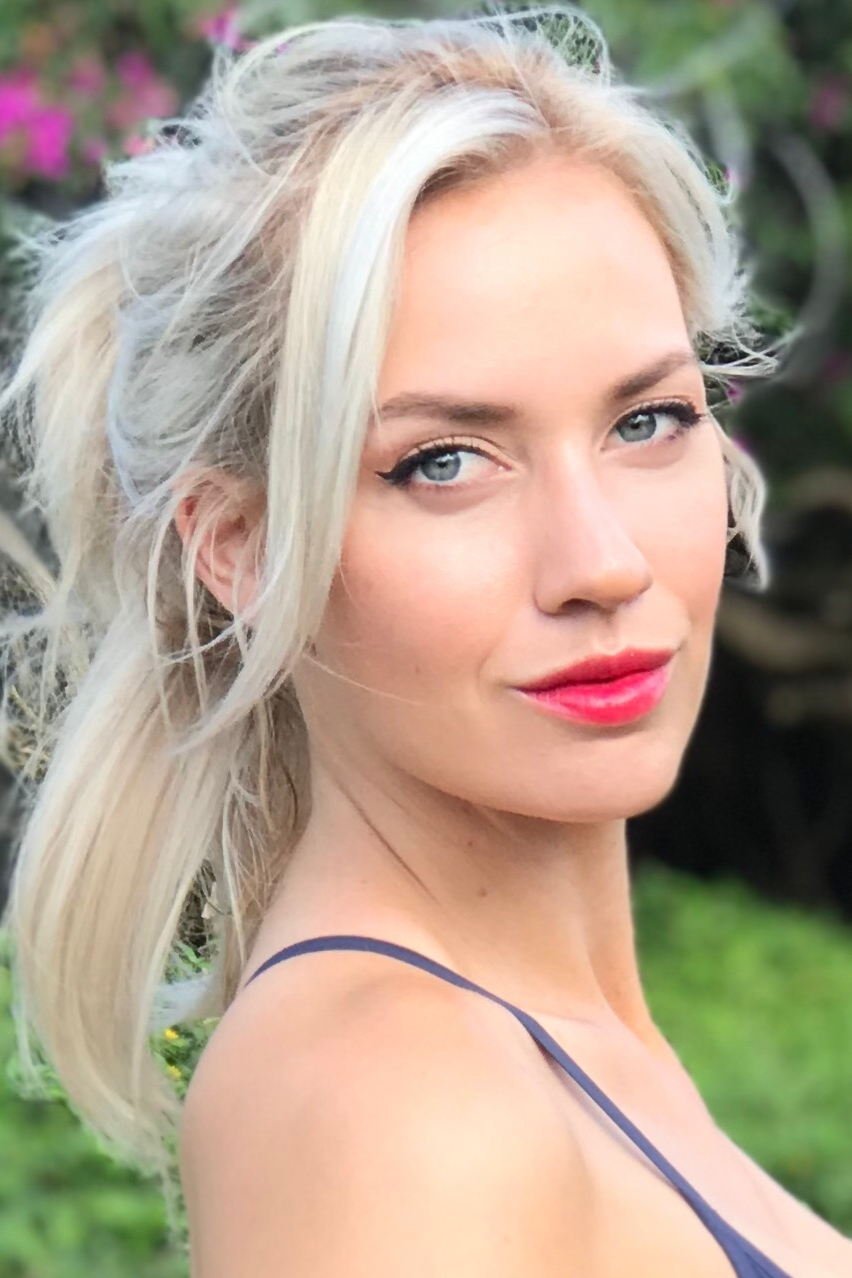
- Spiranac in 2019
- Born: Paige Renee Spiranac; March 26, 1993 (age 33); Wheat Ridge, Colorado, U.S.
- Occupations: Professional golfer; model; businesswoman
- Years active: 2015–present
- Spouse: Steven Tinoco (m. 2018; div. 2022)
- Modeling information
- Height: 170 cm (5 ft 7 in)
- Hair color: Blonde
- Eye color: Blue
- Website: paigespiranac.com

Paige Renee Spiranac (/spɪˈrænæk/ spi-RANAK; born March 26, 1993) is an American professional golfer, model and social media personality. She played NCAA Division I golf at both the University of Arizona and San Diego State University, winning All-Mountain West Conference (MWC) honors during the 2012–13 and 2013–14 seasons, and leading the Aztecs to their first MWC championship in 2015.

== Early life and education ==
Spiranac was born in Wheat Ridge, Colorado. Her father, Dan, was on the University of Pittsburgh Panthers football team, which won the 1976 national college championship. Her mother, Annette, was a professional ballerina. Her older sister Lexie earned a college athletic scholarship, competing on Stanford's track team. Spiranac has noted that her parents were "very religious", a heritage that she has embraced.

Spiranac grew up in Monument, Colorado, where she did gymnastics and hoped to compete in the Olympics. At 12, a twice-broken kneecap led to a decision to end her gymnastics career and try golf. Her parents decided she would be homeschooled due to her history of being bullied and her anxiety.

In order to be able to play golf year-round, Spiranac split her time between Scottsdale, Arizona, and Monument, Colorado during her teen years.

== Career ==
=== 2010–2016: Amateur and professional golf ===
In her early golf career, Spiranac won five tournaments on Colorado's junior golf circuit, including the 2010 CWGA Junior Stroke Play. She became a top-20 world junior player, a top-5 college recruit, a two-time West Region Player of the Year, and a first-team All-American as a Future Collegians World Tour member. She earned a golf scholarship from the University of Arizona.

In her freshman year in 2011–2012, Spiranac played golf for the University of Arizona Wildcats. She competed in the Windy City Intercollegiate, the Pac-12/SEC Challenge, and the Wildcat Invitational.

Spiranac transferred to San Diego State for her sophomore year, gaining greater success in the 2012–2013 season. Her senior season ended with the Aztecs' first Mountain West Conference Championship, which she described as "one of the absolute happiest moments of my life."

==== Cactus Tour ====
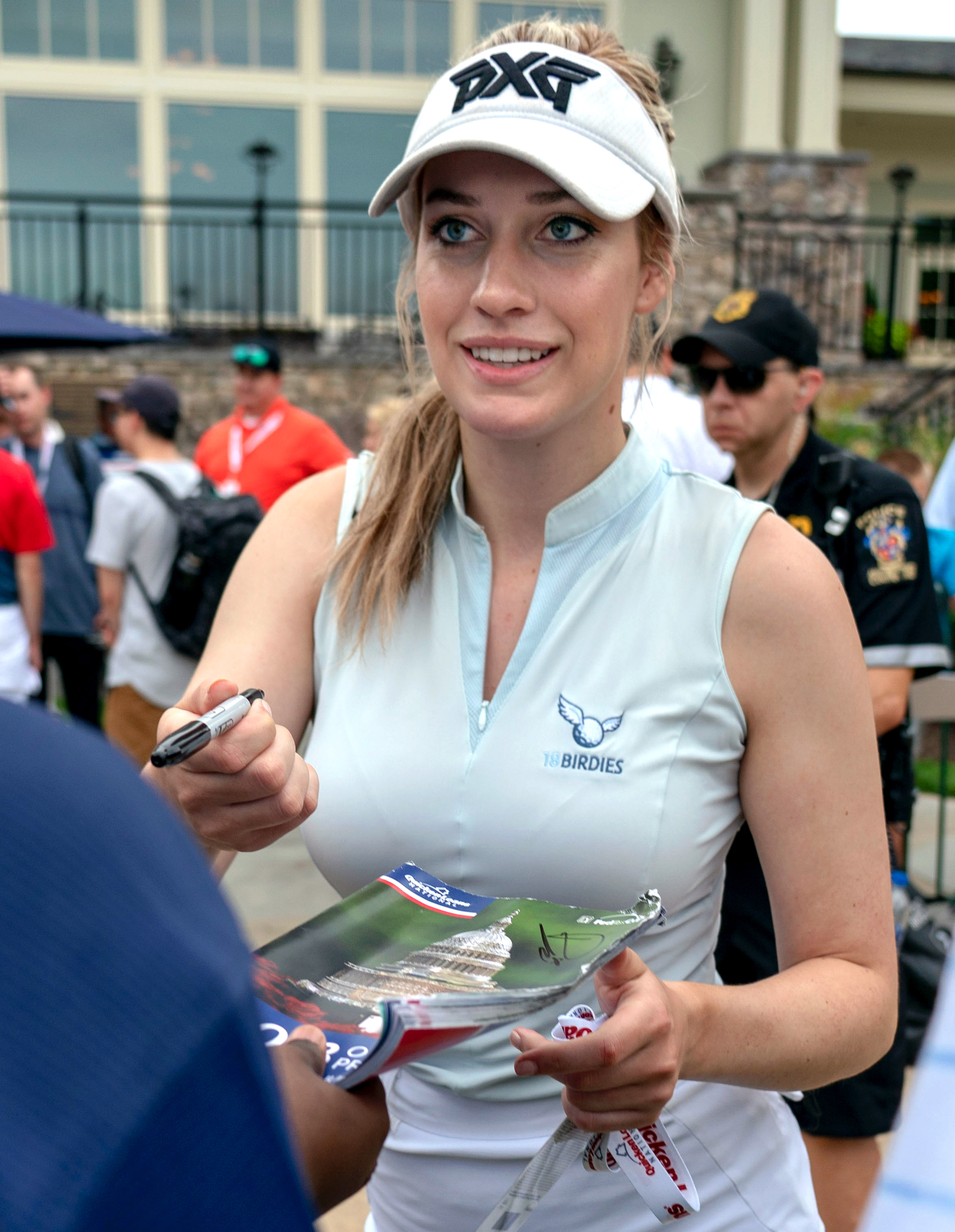
Spiranac at Quicken Loans National in 2018

Spiranac debuted on the developmental Cactus Tour at the Las Colinas Club in Queen Creek, Arizona, in May 2016. A win over Hannah O'Sullivan, the then top-ranked amateur in the world, earned Spiranac her only tour victory. In June 2016, Spiranac finished 17th out of 52 golfers at the Aliante Golf Club. In July, she finished in seventh place at Walnut Creek in Mansfield, Texas. Also in July, she made the cut at the Scottish Open in the Ladies' European Tour.

Spiranac competed in the August/September 2016 CoBank Colorado Women's Open, placing ninth.

In September 2016, Spiranac finished in a three-way second-place tie at Legacy in Phoenix, Arizona, and she had another top-five finish at Trilogy in October. She ended the season with $8,010 in winnings, which was 11th on the money list.

==== LPGA attempt ====
In August 2016, Spiranac competed in her first LPGA Qualifying Tournament but did not earn a card to play on the professional circuit. In 2022, discussing Marshall football's upset of Notre Dame, she joked "Notre Dame is as bad as I was playing professional golf".

=== 2017–present: Post-career activities ===
The LPGA Tour introduced a stricter dress code in July 2017, restricting plunging necklines, leggings, and short skirts. This triggered immediate criticism, characterized by the Fox Sports headline "LPGA slammed for 'slut-shaming' its own players after new dress code restrictions revealed". Spiranac responded in a Fortune magazine op-ed piece days after the LPGA announcement.

In early 2024, Spiranac collaborated with YouTube golf group Good Good. On August 28, 2024, Spiranac participated in the first ever Creator Classic, a PGA sponsored golf tournament featuring various YouTube and social media amateur golfers. She finished in ninth place at the event.

On May 7, 2025, Spiranac participated in the third Creator Classic, on a team with Tyler Toney and Matt Scharff, coming in third place.

In August 2025, Spiranac participated in the inaugural Internet Invitational and lost in the finals of the event. During the finals, she was embroiled in cheating allegations during the ninth hole when she tamped down fescue in order to provide her partner with a better lie. Another golfer, Peter Finch informed others of the infraction, but no penalty was ultimately assessed as her team lost the hole anyway. She also broke down in tears in a video she posted online, upon receiving backlash during the series prior to the final episode airing.

== Other ventures ==
In 2017, Spiranac signed with Parsons Xtreme Golf (PXG) to represent its golf clubs on social media and in television ads. That year, she also became a brand ambassador for 18Birdies to help market its golf app nationwide. She has signed deals with Mizzen + Main and Philip Stein Watches.

Spiranac has been featured in the Sports Illustrated Swimsuit Issue edition and Golf Digest. She writes a monthly column in Golf Magazine, with her first article published in the December 2018 issue. Spiranac has discussed being cyberbullied for "sexualizing women's golf." When appearing in the Sports Illustrated Swimsuit Issue, she stated that she wanted to use the platform to speak out about cyberbullying and to send a message of self-love.

In February 2020, Spiranac started a podcast called Playing-A-Round with Paige Renee.

In 2021, Spiranac joined global sportsbook operator PointsBet as a brand ambassador, on-air personality, and a "significant" equity stakeholder.

In June 2022, Spiranac was named 'Sexiest Woman Alive' in Maxim's 2022 Hot 100 list, the first athlete to attain the No.1 spot.

Spiranac has been described as golf's top social media influencer. As of October 2023, she has 3.9 million Instagram followers and 359 thousand YouTube subscribers. In July 2023, Spiranac launched a subscription-based website called OnlyPaige, which features golf instructional videos, livestreams, and vlogs.

In February 2025, Spiranac launched a YouTube channel called Las Paigeas to provide a different approach to golf content.

== Personal life ==
Spiranac married athletic trainer Steven Tinoco in 2018. On March 7, 2022, she announced that she was no longer married.

== Filmography ==
Film roles
Year	Title	Role	Notes	Ref.
2025	Happy Gilmore 2	Golf Shop salesperson	Cameo	
