= Good Good (YouTube channel) =

American YouTube channel

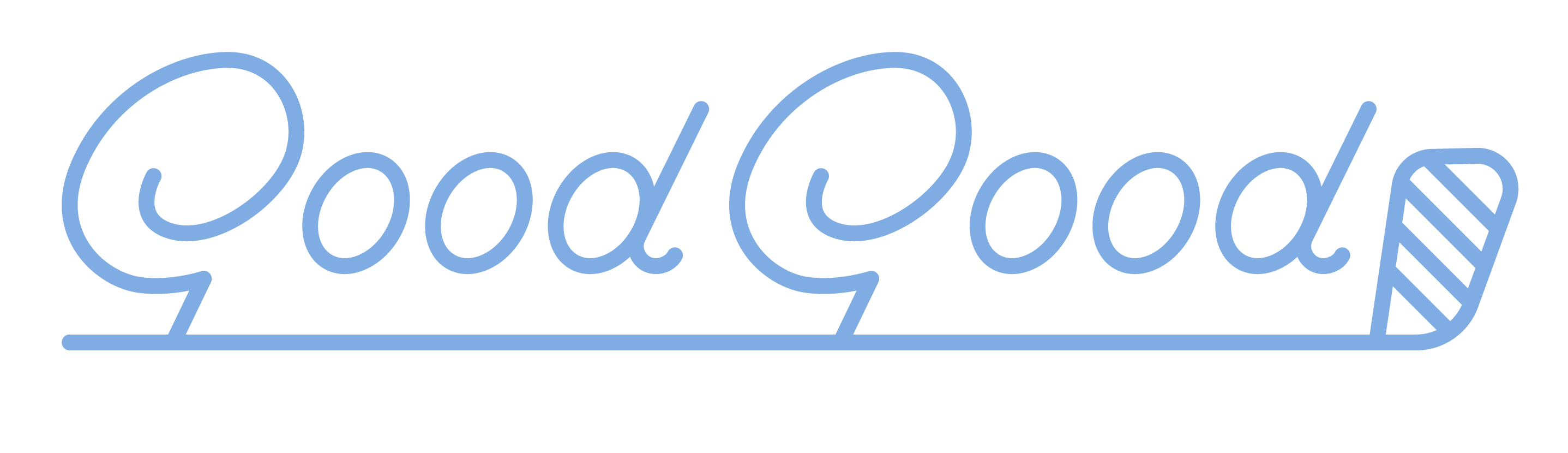

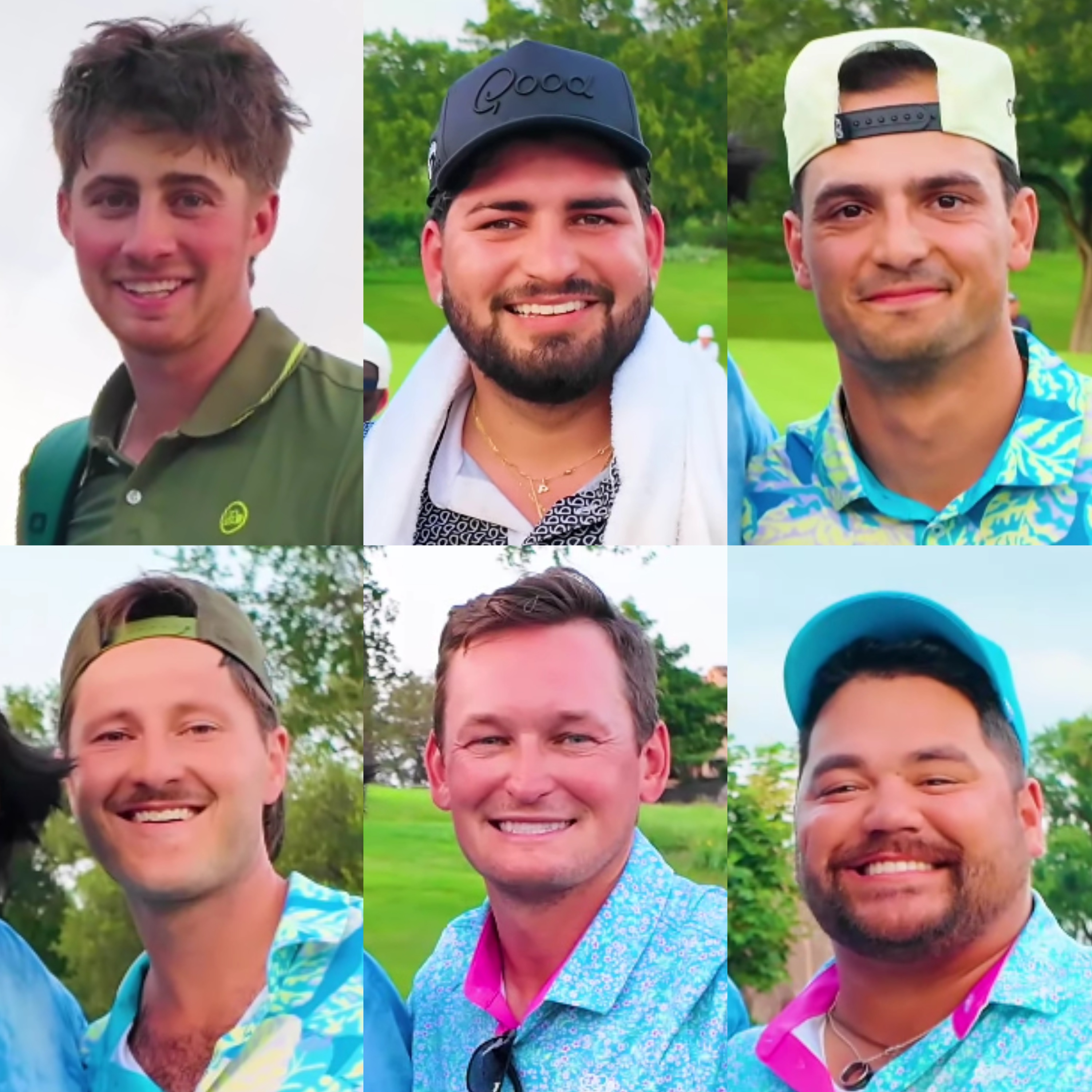
- Most of the channel's members in 2025; clockwise from top left: Garrett Clark, Stephen Castaneda, Matt Scharff, Malosi Togisala, Sean Walsh, Tom "Bubbie" Broders
- Type: Private
- Industry: Media; apparel
- Founded: 2020
- Founders: Garrett Clark; Stephen Castaneda; Matt Scharff
- Headquarters: Frisco, Texas, United States
- Key people: Nahid Giga (interim CEO); Alex Puchala (CFO & COO)
- Years active: 2020–present

YouTube information
- Channel: Good Good
- Genres: Sports; comedy
- Subscribers: 2.12 million
- Views: 719.3 million
- Last updated: September 2, 2026
- Website: goodgoodgolf.com

Good Good is an American sports YouTube channel and company based in Frisco, Texas. Founded in 2020 by Garrett Clark, Stephen Castaneda, and Matt Scharff, the channel focuses around golf challenges and games, often with other sports figures. It is credited with popularizing the sport with a younger demographic in the 2020s. Notable former members of the channel include Brad Dalke, Grant Horvat, and Luke Kwon.

The channel also operates a premium apparel brand which was reported to have contributed to 75% of the company's monthly revenue in 2025. They have also hosted multiple events featuring YouTube golf creators.

== History ==
=== Formation and growth ===
Although the Good Good YouTube channel was created on July 22, 2020, its first video, the group's house tour, was not uploaded until September of that year. The channel's founders were mainly originally from Kansas City, Kansas, relocating to Frisco for the channel. Garrett Clark, a baseball and soccer player in his youth, started a previous, non-golf YouTube channel when he was nine of himself playing the piano and building Lego; he only started playing golf at thirteen, when some of his friends convinced him to play with them at a six-hole par-3 course. It was a negative and frustrating experience for him until he, 85 yards out with a 7-iron, made a hole-in-one. Clark began playing in junior golf tournaments and uploading highlights from them to his YouTube channel, GM Golf, later dropping tournaments in favor of making golf trick shot videos. When GM Golf reached 30,000 subscribers, the NCAA informed Clark's father that he was ineligible to join because of NIL rules at the time, although Clark claimed that he never accepted sponsorship money. He later joined the Kansas City Kansas Community College golf team, traveling for golf while also uploading ninety videos in ninety days for his channel.

Despite all of his efforts, Clark's videos were unsuccessful and he was considering quitting his channel by the winter of his first year in college. He went out to dinner at IHOP with one of his best friends, Stephen Castaneda, and told him about his problems, leading to Castaneda offering to film with him to help. Clark met Castaneda through both of their sisters, who were family friends. He had initially brought Castaneda, a soccer player who had not played golf until he was seventeen, into the sport by playing challenges with him using random objects and items, which led him to adapt into liking golf. Clark also had his friend Matt Scharff join them; Clark first met Scharff when they were both around fourteen, after Clark joined Scharff and his brother once when they were playing a game. They met again in high school, playing for opposing teams, but did not become friends again until Clark responded to one of Scharff's Snapchat stories when they were in college. With the assistance of Castaneda and Scharff, GM Golf grew from 30,000 to 170,000 subscribers in three months. After this success and the end of his freshman year in college, Clark considered dropping out of college to pursue YouTube, but his father, a financial advisor, said that Clark would need to make $60,000 from the channel in the three months over the summer to drop out. Despite having previously only made $5,000 from the channel, Clark succeeded in his father's goal and dropped out. His cousin, Micah "Tig" Morris, who had not played golf until 15, joined the channel about a year later. After dropping out of college, Clark, Morris, Castaneda, and Scharff quarantined at the Pursell Farms golf course in Alabama during the COVID-19 pandemic and created content there alongside, for a short time, golfer George Bryan and football player Brice Butler.

Tom "Bubbie" Broders, from Chicago, grew up playing baseball before getting interested in golf during middle school; he later dropped out of Miami University in Ohio, where he was a caddie, in his senior year to start a YouTube channel, Bubbie Golf. He met the other Good Good members via his channel, TikTok account, and playing Call of Duty, joining the group in summer 2020 after a meetup with them. When Clark was eighteen, he traveled to Palm Beach Atlantic University to see his girlfriend and met Grant Horvat. Horvat made appearances on the GM Golf channel and became popular with the fanbase before joining Good Good about a year and a half after the channel first started. AJ Pujols, son of baseball player Albert Pujols, later joined the channel as a rotating member. Colin Ross and Max Putnam, later members of the channel, initially started out as production experts and editors. They were both college friends from the University of Kansas and had worked on shows such as Cobra Kai. Ross initially reached out to Clark and was hired, later inviting Putnam.

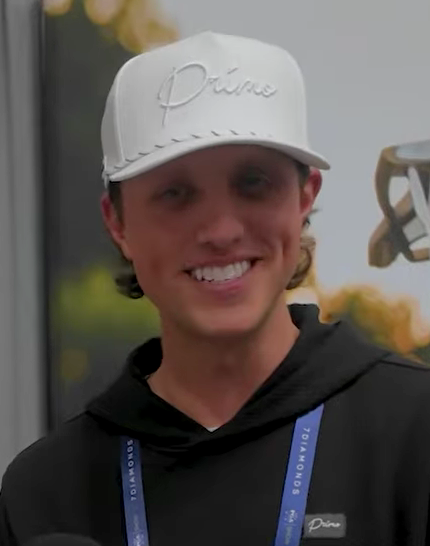
Grant Horvat, who left the channel in 2022.

Good Good launched a premium apparel brand of merchandise in March 2021. The channel reached one million subscribers in 2022, becoming the second golf channel to do so—at that point, it was also the second most-subscribed golf channel on YouTube, only behind Rick Shiels. Clark's personal GM Golf channel later became the third channel to reach the milestone. Luke Kwon started appearing on the channel in August 2022; he had previously been in touch with Clark when Clark began to get serious about making videos, as Kwon had done content creation while in college. Micah Morris and Grant Horvat left separately in 2022. Morris attributed the leave to "creative differences" and Horvat wanted to focus on his own channel—Broders stated that Horvat was offered "the kitchen sink" to stay but turned it down. The leave of Morris and Horvat shocked both fans and the members of the channel. In late December, Good Good announced a deal with sports retail companies Dick's Sporting Goods and Golf Galaxy, placing their brand in stores across the nation. In January 2023, the channel announced a two-year, seven-figure partnership with Callaway Golf Company. Callaway planned to create co-branded, limited-edition equipment alongside the channel. Nick McInally, the Callaway's VP of marketing, noted that the Good Good-branded putters and golf balls set a record in the company for the fastest items to sell out. Discussions were held in order for Good Good to open its first brick-and-mortar store at the Omni PGA Frisco Resort & Spa, but the space was instead given to Vineyard Vines.

In June 2023, Good Good hosted its inaugural Good Good Championship at the Westin Kierland Golf Club in Arizona, which had 63 players and a purse of $100,000. The tournament was application-only. Brad Dalke joined the channel in August 2023. He had known Kwon from his time playing at the University of Oklahoma and first played with the rest of the group earlier in February, when they asked Dalke to collaborate with them when they played at the Oak Tree National in Oklahoma, where Dalke was practicing every day. Castaneda, Clark, Dalke, and Scharff played pro–am alongside Min Woo Lee at the Desert Classic in January 2024. Lee got in contact with the group through Clark, who was close with Lee's manager and reached out to him first. Good Good had also previously competed with Lululemon to sign Lee to an apparel endorsement; however, Lee eventually chose Lululemon over the channel. Good Good hosted the Good Good Desert Open the next month at the Grass Clippings Rolling Hills in Arizona. Twenty-six teams of two competed in a scramble format. Initially meant to be a prelude to the Phoenix Open, the stream, which was broadcast by NBC Sports, reached over 100,000 concurrent viewers. A similar tournament, the Good Good Midwest Open, was held in June at the Pete Dye Course at French Lick in Indiana, with 15 duos for a purse of $100,000. Kwon had left the channel the previous April, stating that he wanted to "take a bet on [himself]." He was replaced by his longtime friend Sean Walsh, who first met Good Good in 2023 after being invited to play in one of their events and finishing second. The group liked him and invited him for more videos. Members from the group also competed at the inaugural Creator Classic 1 in August.

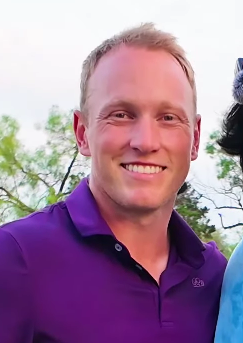
Brad Dalke, who left the channel in 2026.

In January 2025, Good Good announced that it had signed apparel deals with Joel Dahmen, Beau Hossler, John Pak, Willie Mack III, and Michael Block. In February, Good Good aired the Good Good GolfNow Desert Knockout exclusively on Golf Channel; in a continuation of the Good Good Desert Open from the previous year, twelve duos competed in a knockout format. Also in that month, Good Good also appeared on the third season of the television documentary series Full Swing and acquired an ownership stake in the TGL team Los Angeles Golf Club. In March, Good Good raised $45 million in funding through the Creator Sports Capital investor group. Good Good stated that the investment, which included over fifty investors such as football player Peyton Manning's Omaha Productions, would allow the company to create a sales team that will popularize the company's products internationally and also to hire a translation team for their videos. Good Good hosted the Good Good Lonestar Shootout, a charity event of twelve duos of NFL players teaming with Good Good members in a scramble, at the Horseshoe Bay Resort in Texas in June. In August, Dalke won the Creator Classic 4 and the inaugural 2025 Internet Invitational, splitting the latter's $1 million prize with his two other teammates. The following month, they hosted the knockout tournament Good Good Golf King of the Mountain, which took place between eight duos at Kemper Lakes Golf Club in Illinois. It featured a $100,000 prize pool and a $50,000 donation to the winner's charity.

In October 2025, it was announced that the PGA Tour would add the Good Good Championship, which was title sponsored by the channel, as an official event during the Tour. The event would take place in November 2026 at Omni Barton Creek Resort & Spa. Later that month, Good Good announced that it would be working with Golf Channel to co-produce a revival of its reality competition series The Big Break; the revival would be hosted by Scharff and Blair O'Neal, with Clark and Broders acting as team captains, and the winner receiving a sponsor exemption to the Good Good Championship. Dalke and Walsh were also two out of the twelve contestants participating in the competition at Horseshoe Bay Resort. The next month, Good Good partnered with TGL's Boston Common Golf team to host the Boston Tee Party in the SoFi Center in Florida. The event featured musicians Niall Horan and Noah Kahan opposing each other in teams of three alongside members of Good Good. In February 2026, the company announced that they would become the title sponsor of the North Texas PGA, official apparel provider of the organization's staff, and sponsor of junior events on its Ewing Automotive NTPGA Junior Tour. Dalke left Good Good in June, stating that he wanted to focus on his wife's health. The channel entered a partnership with fellow Dallas-based group Dude Perfect the next month, appearing on Dude Perfect's tours in exchange for Dude Perfect to license its brand to them.

=== Callaway advertisement controversy ===
On August 21, 2026, Callaway and Good Good released an advertisement for a new co-branded driver; the spot began with Clark shoving former NCAA Division I golfer Alexis Miestowski—who was associated with the channel—to the ground as she went to touch the driver, with Clark promptly warning her to not touch his new Callaway driver. The commercial faced criticism for its misogynistic themes and was accused of promoting violence against women.

On August 23, Good Good announced that the ad had been pulled, stating that it "ultimately depicted actions that are not aligned with our values as a brand" and that "Good Good has always stood for making the game of golf more inclusive to all, and we will continue to ensure that is our mission moving forward". In response to the controversy, Dick's Sporting Goods and its subsidiary Golf Galaxy pulled all Good Good products from its stores and withdrew its sponsorship of Big Break × Good Good; Golf Channel subsequently delayed the season premiere by a week in order to remove references to the sponsorship.

On August 27, Callaway announced that it would pull out of its content and merchandising partnerships with Good Good effective immediately, and that it would make $1 million in donations to support organizations that participate in activism against violence against women. The same day, Good Good announced that it would withdraw its sponsorship of the Good Good Championship, stating that "we recognize that we have work to do as an organization, and our focus right now is on our team, our culture and ensuring we learn from this situation." As a consequence of the decision, Golf Channel announced that Big Break × Good Good would not be aired.

On September 1, it was reported that Good Good had fired Jeffrey Lefkovits, its vice president of brand and marketing, while Callaway fired one of its directors. The next day, Good Good announced in a memo to its employees that CEO Matt Kendrick and president Joe Flannery were no longer with the company, with Good Good co-founder Nahid Giga taking over as interim CEO. Flannery had been announced as Good Good's president on August 21, which was the same day that the Callaway ad was published.

== Content and operations ==
Good Good's content mainly revolves around golf challenges and games. The channel is family-friendly; their core audience is primarily 18-to-34-year-olds. Good Good frequently travels around the country and internationally to different golf courses to film their videos, which are typically 30–45 minutes long. Their routine is traveling for one week every month and then shooting 10–12 videos in that location. Bryson DeChambeau is a frequent guest of the channel. In 2024, the channel had ten editors or producers.

Good Good structures itself as primarily a merchandise company; its parent company is Scoreboard Ventures. One of the company's partners, Matt Kendrick, was the CEO of Good Good from its founding until his departure in September 2026. He had previously overseen the fishing channel Googan Squad and met Clark at a golf tournament. The channel is based in Frisco, where Kendrick lives, as, when the channel started, it was easier to move the members to the city than to move his family to Kansas City. Good Good's Frisco house, which featured in the channel's first video, was a 6,000 sq ft (560 m^{2}) residence leased from basketball player DeSagana Diop.

When creating the Good Good channel, the group considered names such as the "Bogey Boys," "Birdie Boys," and "The Sandbaggers." The name Good Good was suggested by Kendrick, who originally thought of the name when he was in college and had not had a chance to use it until then. It comes from a term said between golfers at the putting green when both of their balls are close enough to the hole and they would rather not continue with putting, recording their scores as if they both made the short putts and moving on to the next hole.
