= Luke Kwon =

South Korean and American golfer (born 1992)

Personal information
- Nationality: South Korea
- Born: August 11, 1992 (age 34) Seoul, South Korea
- Height: 5 ft 10 in (1.78 m)
- Weight: 180 lb (82 kg; 13 st)

Career
- Sport: Golf
- College: University of Oklahoma
- Turned professional: 2016
- Former tours: Korn Ferry Tour; PGA Tour China; PGA Tour Latinoamérica
- Professional wins: 1

Number of wins by tour
- Asian Tour: 1

Luke Kwon (born August 11, 1992) is a South Korean and American professional golfer and YouTube content creator who played on the Korn Ferry Tour, PGA Tour China, and PGA Tour Latinoamérica.

== Early life ==
Kwon was born in Seoul, South Korea to Peter and Sara Kwon. He played golf at the University of Oklahoma. At age 21, Kwon lost his "dependency" status under his parents' work visa. Without a green card that he applied for within thirteen years prior, he reluctantly switched to a temporary student visa.

Kwon's golf skills were attributed to the Oklahoma Sooners entering the NCAA men's golf championship for the first time in 2016. The Sooners lost a quarterfinals match to the eventual championship winner Texas Longhorns. After graduation, he briefly worked as a forecaddie in Dallas. When his visa was expiring, he moved to China to continue his golfing career.

== Professional career ==
=== Professional golf tour career ===
Kwon went pro in 2016 and has earned $776,083 and played in over 47 PGA events in his professional career. He has one professional tour win on the PGA Tour China.

On May 19, 2019, Kwon won the Qinhuangdao Championship on the PGA Tour China in Hebei, China. He finished in the top five on the PGA Tour China that season. As a result of the Order of Merit, he was qualified for the 2020-21 Korn Ferry Tour.

Kwon made his debut on the Asian Tour in October 2024. He made two under par 70 to make the cut at the Black Mountain Championship for his Asian Tour debut. In March 2025, he made the cut by one stroke for the International Series Macau.

=== YouTube Golf ===
Kwon is known as a golf influencer, mainly featuring on YouTube with instructional videos and playing in various golf events on his own YouTube channel and on other golf influencer channels. In 2025, My Golf Spy rated Kwon as one of the fastest growing golf channels on YouTube.

Kwon joined Good Good in August 2022. He gained a great deal of fame in the YouTube golf world during his time with Good Good, but ultimately announced his departure in April 2024.

On August 8, 2024, Kwon won the inaugural Creator Classic at East Lake Golf Club in Atlanta. More than 110,000 people watched him win on the PGA Tour's YouTube channel.

In April 2025, Kwon took part in the LIV Golf Miami Duels. He was partnered with Bubba Watson and lost in the final playoffs to Sergio García and George Bryan.

Kwon participated in the inaugural Internet Invitational in August 2025, which was a YouTube golf event organized by Barstool Sports and Bob Does Sports.

== Personal life ==
In 2022, Kwon nearly died after he was involved in a golf cart accident. Kwon was playing in an alumni golf tournament for the University of Oklahoma when he accidentally hit his head on a bridge railing at the event. He finished the round of seven more holes and went to the hospital afterwards at the urging of his girlfriend. Upon a CT scan, it was revealed that one-fourth of Kwon's brain was bleeding. He underwent emergency brain surgery and doctors removed a portion of his skull to relieve the swelling.

== Controversies ==
In a 2019 article by NBC Sports, Luke Kwon was criticized for his past issues at the University of Oklahoma. Kwon was apparently almost kicked off the team by head golf coach, Ryan Hybl, due to his maturity issues, but was instead given an ultimatum. He was barred from practice for two weeks and given the sole responsibility to wake up at 6 a.m. during those two weeks and meet with the weight-training staff. Fortunately, he met his requirements and stayed on the team.

Kwon became embroiled in controversy when the Internet Invitational first aired in October 2025 due to Kwon missing his tee time and being penalized by having to sit out the first four holes of his match. He was further criticized for his comments to his partner, PFT Commenter after he arrived late to the first round of the event. After the round was over, he was bitterly admonished by teammate, Ryan Whitney, a former National Hockey League player and host of the Spittin' Chiclets podcast at Barstool. Kwon ultimately apologized for his actions at the event, stating “I apologize like sincerely from the bottom of my heart.” The Asian Tour made light of Kwon's issues waking up on time afterwards.

== Professional wins (1) ==
=== PGA Tour China wins (1) ===
No.	Date	Tournament	Winning score	To par	Margin of victory	Runner-up
1	19 May 2019	Qinhuangdao Championship	67-67-71-65=270	−18	1 stroke	(Canada) Myles Creighton
