= Grant Horvat =

American golfer and YouTuber (born 1998)

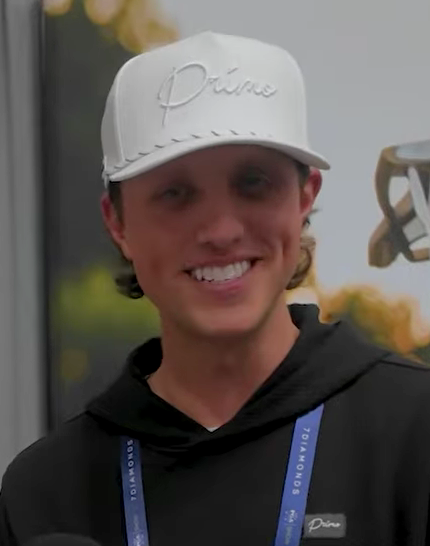
- Horvat in 2026
- Born: Steven Grant Horvat; August 24, 1998 (age 28); Grosse Ile Township, Michigan, U.S.
- Education: South Fork High School; Palm Beach Atlantic University
- Years active: 2021–present

YouTube information
- Channel: Grant Horvat Golf
- Genre: Sports
- Subscribers: 1.63 million
- Views: 317 million
- Last updated: March 9, 2026

Steven Grant Horvat (born August 24, 1998), is an American golfer and YouTuber. A former Division II collegiate player, Horvat gained popularity after joining the YouTube channel Good Good, which he left in 2022. Horvat won the Creator Classic 2 in 2025; he has been invited to multiple PGA Tour tournaments but has declined them due to the Tour not allowing him to film the event because of conflicting media rights.

== Early life ==
Steven Grant Horvat was born on August 24, 1998, in Grosse Ile Township, Michigan. His father, Steve, was a professional golfer who competed on the PGA Tour of Australasia and is a member of the Central Michigan University Hall of Fame. He originally grew up playing basketball, but switched to golf when he was 12.

When Horvat was a freshman in high school, his family moved to Pennsylvania, and the year after, in 2014, they moved again to Stuart, Florida, to be able to practice golf year-round. He attended South Fork High School, competing in the South Florida PGA Junior Tour and the Florida Junior Tour to push for a college scholarship. In 2015 and 2016, he received First-Team All-Area honors.

Horvat originally wanted to major in marine biology, but thought of the possibility of playing on the PGA Tour if he performed well in college. After graduating high school, Horvat attended Palm Beach Atlantic University from 2017 to 2021, playing for the Sailfish. While in college, he made the SSC Commissioner's Honor Roll four times and was recognized as an GCAA All-American Scholar. In his senior year, at the SSC Tournament, he placed T-7, which tied for the school's record highest placement.

== Career ==
From 2020 to 2025, Horvat played in eight Minor League Golf Tour events; his best placement was in 2023, at a tie for sixth at the Osprey Point May Classic. He had a total of $440 in career earnings on the tour. Horvat first began to create content in 2021, while working at the Frenchmen's Reserve Country Club. He also was a member of the YouTube golf collective Good Good, but left it in late 2022 to pursue his own brand and channel. In 2023, he signed with TaylorMade. In 2024, Horvat competed at The Q at Myrtle Beach, a shootout in which the winner qualified to play in the Myrtle Beach Classic. During the 2024 PGA Tour, he was an on-court analyst and reporter. He was also invited to play at the Creator Classic 1, but could not attend due to his best friend's wedding being the day after.

In 2025, Horvat became a partial owner of Takomo Golf. He won the Creator Classic 2 in March of that year, defeating George Bryan and Chris Solomon in the playoffs. Following his victory, the PGA Tour gave him a sponsorship invitation to play in one of its tournaments. He declined it, saying that he enjoys YouTube still and that there is a large skill-gap between a professional golfer and himself. In April, after helping organize The Duels: Miami tournament with LIV Golf, he was again invited to another PGA tournament, this time the Reno–Tahoe Open. Horvat declined the invitation after the Tour did not allow his camera crew to go with him to film his rounds due to complications with media rights. He said that he would be open to playing in the future if the Tour amended this rule. In August 2025, Horvat participated in the inaugural Internet Invitational, a YouTube golf event for influencers organized by Barstool Sports and Bob Does Sports.

== Personal life ==
Horvat married Sadee Farinha in November 2022. He has stated that his favorite players are Rory McIlroy and Justin Thomas.
