= TDPS =

TDPS may refer to:

- The David Pakman Show, a news talk show
- The Dude Perfect Show, a reality television program
