= Creator Classic =

Golf tournament in the United States

Tournament information
- Location: Atlanta, United States
- Established: 2024
- Course: East Lake Golf Club
- Organized by: PGA Tour and Pro Shop Studios

Current champion
- Brad Dalke

The Creator Classic is a golf tournament conducted by the PGA Tour and produced by Pro Shop Studios. It features various "YouTube golfers" and social media personalities such as Paige Spiranac and Grant Horvat. There have been four Creator Classics thus far, with more planned in the future.

== History ==
=== Winners ===
| Classic Number | Location | Date | Winner(s) |
|---|---|---|---|
| 1 | East Lake Golf Club; Atlanta | Aug 8, 2024 | Luke Kwon |
| 2 | TPC at Sawgrass; Ponte Vedra Beach, Florida | Mar 12, 2025 | Grant Horvat |
| 3 | Philadelphia Cricket Club; Wissahickon, Philadelphia | May 7, 2025 | Josh Richards/Erik Anders Lang/Brad Dalke |
| 4 | East Lake Golf Club; Atlanta | Aug 20, 2025 | Brad Dalke |

== Tournaments ==
=== Creator Classic 1 ===
The first Creator Classic took place on August 28, 2024 in Atlanta at East Lake Golf Club. It featured 16 "creators" who are largely characterized as "Youtube golfers". The winner of the First Creator Classic was Luke Kwon. Riggs, Trent and Frankie from Barstool Sports' Fore Play Podcast commenced the event with ceremonial tee shots. The event was sponsored by Blackstone Inc.

| Player | Score relative to par (through 8 holes, prior to playoff) | Brand |
|---|---|---|
| Winner: Luke Kwon | 1-under | |
| Wesley Bryan | 2-under | Bryan Bros |
| Roger Steele | 1-under | |
| Sean Walsh | 1-under | Good Good |
| Brad Dalke | even | Good Good |
| Micah Morris | even | |
| Peter Finch | even | |
| George Bryan | 1-over | Bryan Bros |
| Paige Spiranac | 2-over | |
| Gabby Golf Girl | 3-over | |
| Mason Nutt | 4-over | BustaJack |
| Aimee Cho | 4-over | |
| Fat Perez | 5-over | Bob Does Sports |
| Garrett Clark | 6-over | Good Good |
| Mac Boucher | 7-over | |
| Tyler Toney | 10-over | Dude Perfect |

Luke Kwon beat Wesley Bryan, Sean Walsh and Roger Steele in a sudden-death playoff to win the inaugural event.

=== Creator Classic 2 ===
The second Creator Classic took place on March 12, 2025 in Ponte Vedra Beach, Florida at TPC at Sawgrass. The tournament featured ten "Youtube golfers." Grant Horvat was the winner of this tournament. This event took place just prior to The Players Championship for 2025.

| Player | Score relative to par (through 8 holes, prior to playoff) | Brand |
|---|---|---|
| Winner: Grant Horvat | +1 | |
| George Bryan | +1 | Bryan Bros |
| Chris Solomon | +2 | |
| Roger Steele | +3 | |
| Fat Perez | +4 | Bob Does Sports |
| Kyle Berkshire | +6 | |
| Tisha Alyn | +6 | |
| Gabby Golf Girl | +6 | |
| Wesley Bryan | +6 | Bryan Bros |
| Trent Ryan | +29 | Foreplay Golf/Barstool Sports |

Grant Horvat, George Bryan and Chris Solomon advanced to the playoff round, with Horvat winning it in the playoffs.

=== Creator Classic 3 ===
The third Creator Classic was held on May 7, 2025 at the Philadelphia Cricket Club in Wissahickon, Philadelphia. This tournament had a different format than the first two "Creator Classics". It featured four teams of 3 "Youtube golfers," playing in an Alternate shot format. The winning trio was the team of Josh Richards, Erik Anders Lang, and Brad Dalke. This tournament took place just prior to the 2025 Truist Championship.

The results were as follows:

| Teams | Score relative to par (through 8 holes, prior to playoff) |
|---|---|
| Josh Richards/Erik Anders Lang/Brad Dalke | +8 |
| Marques Brownlee, Sean Walsh, Sabrina Andolpho | +3 |
| Tyler Toney, Matt Scharff, Paige Spiranac | +8 |
| Kyle Lowry, Josh Kelley, Claire Hogle | +8 |

Although the trio of Marques Brownlee, Sean Walsh and Sabrina Andolpho were winning after the initial round, there was a chip-off for the other team to meet them in the playoff as all the other teams were tied at 8-over par. The team of Josh Richards, Erik Anders Lang, and Brad Dalke went on to beat the Marques Brownlee team in the sudden death playoffs, after winning the chip off against the other teams.

=== Creator Classic 4 ===
The Creator Classic took place on August 20, 2025, at East Lake Golf Club in Atlanta before the Tour Championship.

Nine creators took part in the qualifier: seven from the United States and two from Europe – Matt Fisher (Mr. Short Game), Mason Nutt, Ben Kruper, Caitlyn Henderson, Snappy Gilmore, Chance Taylor, Daniel Saloner (Short Game King), Ellie Skoog (Sweden), Arnaud Serie (France).

Brad Dalke won the event.
