= South Fork High School =

Location
- 10000 SW Bulldog Way; Stuart, Florida 34997; United States; 27°04′36″N 80°15′10″W

Information
- Type: Public high school
- Established: 1982
- Locale: Rural fringe
- Principal: Jaime Thompson
- Teaching staff: 90.00 (on an FTE basis)
- Grades: 9-12
- Enrollment: 1,814 (2023-2024)
- Student to teacher ratio: 20.16
- Colors: Red, White and Black
- Nickname: Bulldogs
- Newspaper: Bulldog Brief
- Website: www.martinschools.org/o/sfhs

South Fork High School (SFHS) is a public high school in Stuart, Florida, United States. It is part of the Martin County School District.

The school's mascot is the Bulldog, and its colors are black, red and white. South Fork has its own on-campus golf course. There is also an on-campus farm used for cattle and citrus groves, a football/track stadium, tennis and volleyball courts, and a baseball/softball field.

South Fork High is the only high school in the Martin County School District with the International Baccalaureate Diploma Programme.

== Notable alumni ==
- Cleveland Gary, NFL running back
- Tony DiTerlizzi, co-author of seriesThe Spiderwick Chronicles
- Grant Horvat, golfer and YouTuber
- Alicia Minshew, actress
- Charles Emanuel, NFL safety
- Beverly McClellan, finalist in the first season of The Voice
- Corey McIntyre, NFL fullback
- Nick Snyder, MLB Pitcher
- Sydney Towle, American internet personality
