= Junior golf =

Junior golf refers to the game of golf being played by boys and girls who have not finished secondary school or reached the age of 19, whichever comes first.

More specifically, any person falling under the above definition who has played at least one round of golf in a given year is a junior golfer. Competitive junior golfers play in high level competitions. These competitions are found on junior tours such as the American Junior Golf Association, Golf Tour of Asia (JGTA), Future Stars Golf Series, International Junior Golf Tour (IJGT), Tarheel Junior Golf, Texas Legends Junior Tour,. Competitions are ranked by national services to identify the best players of a country. In the UK there are a number of junior golf tours with the largest being run by the Independent Schools Golf Association (ISGA), and the British Schools Golf Association,.

Among the most prominent national junior tournaments are the U.S. Junior Amateur, U.S. Girls' Junior, the Western Junior, the Northern Junior, SDJGA IMG Junior World Championships and The Press Thornton Future Masters.

The First Tee is an international youth development organization introducing the game of golf and its inherent values to young people. Their focus is to positively impact the lives of kids and teens from all walks of life by reinforcing values like integrity, respect and perseverance through the game of golf.
