= The Benjamin School =

School in Palm Beach County, Florida

Coordinates: 26.83824°N 80.06363°W

- 11000 Ellison Wilson Road; North Palm Beach, FL 33408 (PK3-8); 4875 Grandiflora Road; Palm Beach Gardens, FL 33418 (9–12); United States

Information
- Type: Private; Independent; college-preparatory; day school
- Motto: Nulli Secundus ("Second to None")
- Religious affiliation: Nonsectarian
- Established: 1960
- Founder: Marshall and Nancy Benjamin
- Head of school: David C. Faus
- Faculty: 165
- Grades: PK3 through 12
- Gender: Co-educational
- Enrollment: 1,322
- Student to teacher ratio: 7:1
- Campus type: Suburban
- Colors: Orange & Navy
- Athletics conference: Florida High School Athletic Association (FHSAA)
- Mascot: Buccaneer
- Nickname: Buccaneers
- Accreditation: SACS; SAIS
- Tuition: Lower school: $29,280; Middle school: $34,747; Upper school: $41,600
- Website: www.thebenjaminschool.org

The Benjamin School is a private, coeducational, college-preparatory school with two campuses in Palm Beach County, Florida, United States. It serves 1,322 students in pre-kindergarten through twelfth grade.

It is accredited by the Florida Council of Independent Schools and Florida Kindergarten Council, the Southern Association of Independent Schools, and the Southern Association of Colleges and Schools.

Tuition fees for the 2026–2027 school year range from $19,991 for half-day young child education to $41,600 for high school students.

== History and campus ==
The Benjamin School was founded in 1960 under the name North Palm Beach Private School by married couple Marshall and Nancy Benjamin. It was located in a three-car garage. At that time, the year-round population of Palm Beach was expanding and the Benjamins received donations from wealthy families who would have sent their children to boarding school. In 1974, seventh and eighth grades were added with the intention of growing through high school. The first high school class graduated in 1979.

In 2005, scenes for an episode of My Super Sweet 16 featuring a Benjamin student were filmed outside of the school.

The school built a digital television production studio in 2011 to go along with the addition of broadcast journalism and TV and film production classes. In 2014, The Benjamin School began a modernization campaign that raised around $40 million to pay for the Benjamin Hall performing arts center, the aquatics center, the field house, the varsity house, and the Maglio Family STEM Center.

A January 2017 tornado in Florida severely damaged the school's football stadium. Repairs were not complete until close to a year later.

In January 2018, the school switched from unarmed to armed security guards. Many nearby schools did the same due to the Stoneman Douglas High School shooting the previous month.

During the COVID-19 pandemic, the school received a $3.1 million loan from the federal government through the Paycheck Protection Program, which was instituted to assist struggling small businesses. Largely due to that pandemic, the school reported that applications more than doubled from 2017 to 2022 and total enrollment went from 1,051 to 1,284.

== Student body ==
The racial makeup of The Benjamin School's K-12 student body during the 2019-20 school year was 79% White, 4% Hispanic, 3.8% African American, 3.7% Asian/Pacific Islander, and 8.4% multiracial.

Many current or retired professional golfers who live in the Palm Beach area send their children to the school, including Jack Nicklaus, Tiger Woods, and Greg Norman.

== Academics ==
Benjamin students can choose from a wide range of courses, including 23 AP and 16 honors courses. High school graduation requirements include 4 credits of English, 4 credits of mathematics, 3.5 credits of science, 3 credits of social studies, 1 credit of fine arts, and 0.5 credits of computer science. All students must complete a two-week internship during their junior or senior year.

The world languages curriculum starts in pre-kindergarten with weekly Chinese, French, and Spanish lessons. In first grade, students choose a language to focus on through fifth grade. Middle and upper school students may either continue with the same language or select a new one. Three consecutive years of study in the same language are required for high school graduation.

Niche named Benjamin the third best private high school in Palm Beach County for 2022. Seniors have historically achieved 100% college acceptance.

== Extracurricular activities ==
=== Arts ===
Students can participate in choir, band, drama club, or dance team. The dance team "The Dazzlers" perform at every school football game as well as other events on campus. The arts department puts on many performances throughout the year.

=== Athletics ===
The Benjamin Buccaneers compete in the FHSAA, Class 4A – Region R4. For football, they are a part of the independent Southeastern Football Conference with other Florida private high schools.

High school students can participate in baseball, basketball, bowling, cheerleading, cross-country, football, golf, lacrosse, soccer, softball, swimming, tennis, track and field, volleyball, and wrestling teams. To graduate, they must either take two semesters of PE or play a sport for two seasons.

=== Publications ===
The student newspaper is The Pharcyde. In 2012, it was named the Most Outstanding Private/Parochial School Newspaper in America by the American Scholastic Press Association.

The school's broadcast program, BTV N3WS, was named an All-Florida Publication by the Florida Scholastic Press Association in 2017.

== Notable students and alumni ==
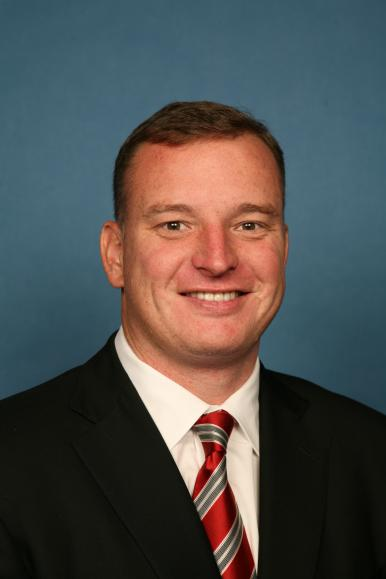
US Rep. Tom Rooney

- Ryan Berube, '92, Olympic gold medalist swimmer
- Chauncey Bowens, '24, running back for the Georgia Bulldogs
- Chris Cocotos, '90, former professional tennis player
- Brennan Curtin, '99, NFL player
- Gabriella DeGasperis, '26, golfer and social media personality better known as Gabby Golf Girl
- Kaiir Elam, '19, cornerback for the Dallas Cowboys
- Erlana Larkins, '04, WNBA player
- Micah Mays Jr., '23, college football wide receiver for the Florida Gators
- Brooke Mueller, actress
- Tom Rooney, '89, former U.S. Representative for Florida's 17th congressional district and current school trustee
- Bennett Sousa, '14, MLB pitcher
- Mark Swift, '88, screenwriter of Freddy vs. Jason and the 2009 remake of Friday the 13th
- Jordan Travis, '18, former professional football player
- Kai Trump, '26, golfer, granddaughter of Donald Trump
- Amaree Williams, '24, college football defensive end for the Mississippi State Bulldogs
- Charlie Axel Woods, '27, golfer, son of Tiger Woods

== Notable faculty and trustees ==
- Jack Armstrong, former MLB pitcher, was hired as head baseball coach in 2017.
- Mike Schmidt, Hall of Fame third baseman, coached junior varsity baseball in 1994
- Darren Lowe, former professional lacrosse player, was hired as head lacrosse coach in 2017. He is also a school trustee.
- Jack Nicklaus, retired professional golfer, is a trustee emeritus.
- Tom Rooney, Florida politician and Benjamin alumnus, is a current trustee.
- Dirk Edward Ziff is a current trustee.
- Eric Kresser, former NFL quarterback, was hired as head football coach in 2018.
