= Corey McIntyre =

American football player (born 1979)

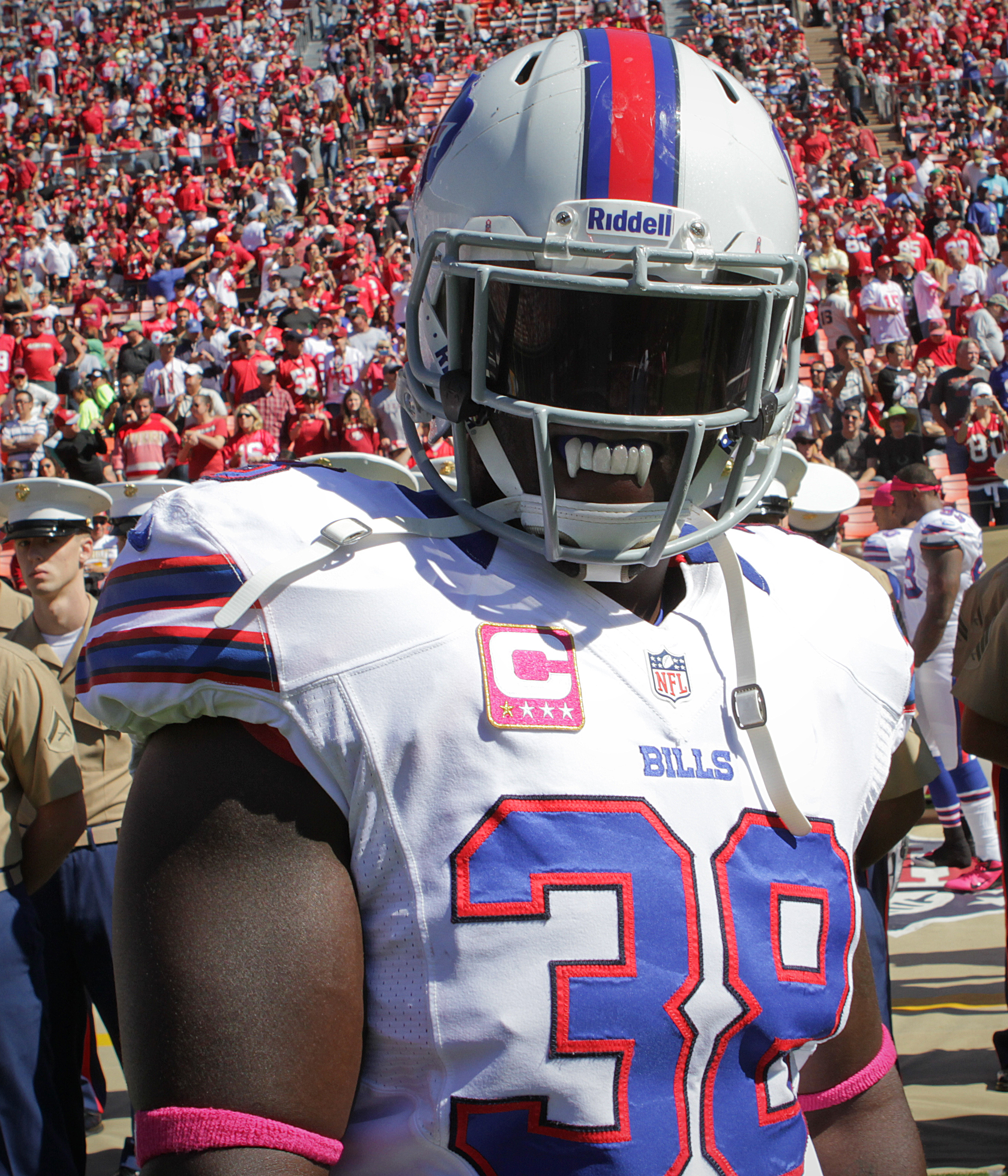
- McIntyre with the Buffalo Bills in 2012

No. 36, 38
- Position: Fullback

Personal information
- Born: January 25, 1979 (age 47); Stuart, Florida, U.S.
- Listed height: 6 ft 0 in (1.83 m)
- Listed weight: 245 lb (111 kg)

Career information
- High school: South Fork (Stuart)
- College: West Virginia
- NFL draft: 2002: undrafted

Career history
- Philadelphia Eagles (2002–2003)*; Frankfurt Galaxy (2003-2004); Cleveland Browns (2004–2005); New Orleans Saints (2006); Atlanta Falcons (2006–2007); Buffalo Bills (2008–2012)
- * Offseason or practice squad member only

Career NFL statistics
- Rushing attempts: 9
- Rushing yards: 39
- Rushing touchdowns: 1
- Receptions: 16
- Receiving yards: 109
- Stats at Pro Football Reference

Corey McIntyre (born January 25, 1979) is an American former professional football player who was a fullback in the National Football League (NFL). He played college football for the West Virginia Mountaineers and was signed by the Philadelphia Eagles as an undrafted free agent in 2002. McIntyre has also played for the Cleveland Browns, New Orleans Saints, Atlanta Falcons, and the Buffalo Bills

== Early life ==
McIntyre attended Indiantown Middle School and South Fork High School.

== College career ==
McIntyre played in 44 games at West Virginia, primarily as a defensive end and linebacker. He rushed three times for four yards as a fullback, and returned five kickoffs for 36 yards.

== Professional career ==
=== Philadelphia Eagles ===
McIntyre was signed by the Philadelphia Eagles as an undrafted free agent on April 26, 2002. He was waived by the Eagles on August 24, 2002. McIntyre was re-signed to the Eagles' practice squad on December 10, 2002, and allocated to the Frankfurt Galaxy to participate in the 2003 NFL Europa season on January 30, 2003. In Europe, he helped his team make it to the World Bowl and, in that game, had 12 carries for 76 yards. He was waived by the Eagles on September 1, 2003.

=== Cleveland Browns ===
McIntyre was signed by the Cleveland Browns as a free agent on June 16, 2004. He was waived by the Browns on September 5, 2004, and signed to the team's practice squad on September 6, 2004. He played in fifteen games for the Browns during the 2005 season and started one.

=== New Orleans Saints ===
The New Orleans Saints signed McIntyre in September 2006 after injuries to two of their fullbacks in the first week of play. He was waived in November.

=== Atlanta Falcons ===
McIntyre was claimed off waivers by the Atlanta Falcons on November 24, 2006. During the 2007 season he was voted as special teams captain and was third on special teams for tackles. He was released from the Falcons on September 2, 2008.

=== Buffalo Bills ===
McIntyre was signed by the Buffalo Bills on September 30, 2008, after the team released fullback Darian Barnes. McIntyre was re-signed to a two-year contract on February 26, 2009. The Bills again re-signed McIntyre to a two-year contract on September 6, 2010.

== Personal life ==
McIntyre is from Indiantown, Florida, has 4 children, and attended school in West Virginia.

In March 2009, McIntyre was arrested and charged with indecent exposure in Port St. Lucie, but the charges were later dropped after the witness retracted her original statement.
