= Amaree Williams =

American football player (born 2006)

No. 4 – Mississippi State Bulldogs
- Position: Defensive end
- Class: Junior

Personal information
- Born: July 24, 2006 (age 20)
- Listed height: 6 ft 4 in (1.93 m)
- Listed weight: 240 lb (109 kg)

Career information
- High school: The Benjamin School (North Palm Beach, Florida)
- College: Florida State (2024–2025); Mississippi State (2026–present)
- Stats at ESPN

Amaree Williams (born July 24, 2006) is an American college football defensive end for the Mississippi State Bulldogs. He previously played for the Florida State Seminoles.

== Early life ==
Williams attended The Benjamin School in North Palm Beach, Florida, where he was a defensive lineman and tight end. He had 40 tackles, 15 sacks and two interceptions his sophomore year and 34 tackles, four sacks, one interception and 16 receptions for 424 yards and seven touchdowns his junior year. Wiliams reclassified from the 2025 to the 2023 recruiting class and committed to Florida State University to play college football.

== College career ==
Williams was a two-way player at Florida State. As a freshman in 2024, he played in eight games and caught five passes for 71 yards and two touchdowns. As a sophomore in 2025, he played in 12 games and had 10 tackles with 1.5 sacks on defense and two receptions for 51 yards and a touchdown on offense. After the season, Williams entered the transfer portal and committed to Mississippi State University. He focused on defense and became a starter his first year at Mississippi State in 2026.

== Personal life ==
His father, Moe Williams, was a running back in the NFL.
