= Gabby Golf Girl =

American golfer and social media personality born 2007)

- Born: Gabriella DeGasperis; September 8, 2007 (age 19); Bronxville, New York
- Education: The Benjamin School
- Years active: 2022–present

Instagram information
- Page: Gabriella DeGasperis
- Followers: 1.2 million

TikTok information
- Page: ɢᴀʙʙʏ / ɢᴏʟғ / ɢɪʀʟ
- Followers: 268 thousand

YouTube information
- Channel: gabbygolfgirl
- Genre: Sports
- Subscribers: 266 thousand
- Views: 114.7 million
- Last updated: July 20, 2026

Gabriella DeGasperis (born September 8, 2007), known online as Gabby Golf Girl, is an American golfer and social media personality. A successful junior golfer in her youth, she began creating content seriously in 2022.

== Early life ==
Gabriella DeGasperis was born on September 8, 2007, in Bronxville, New York, although she was based in Briarcliff Manor, playing at the Trump National Golf Club Westchester. She began playing golf at the age of two, when her parents gave her a set of pink clubs, which she played with on the grass at her house. DeGasperis first went to the course when she was five with her father, Ron DeGasperis, who claims that he is an "avid but average golfer." She was also playing tennis at the time, but switched fully to golf when she was six. By 2016, she had achieved over twenty wins in the seven-and-under age group. DeGasperis also placed fourth at the 2015 U.S. Kids World Championship at Pinehurst Resort. During her early years (c. 2016), she was coached by Judy Carlson, the Director of Instruction at Trump National Golf Club Westchester. DeGasperis attended The Benjamin School and broke the school's record, shooting 64 at Plantation Preserve as an eighth grader, being one of the only two middle schoolers to make the varsity team.

== Career ==
DeGasperis started her Instagram page when she was six or seven years old. She rarely posted and, when she did, mainly uploaded trick shot videos. DeGasperis began posting more frequently in July 2022, when she began to create daily golf workout videos. She was inspired by her personal trainer, who had also achieved success on social media. She diversified her content outside workouts after a suggestion from her friend; DeGasperis began also uploading videos on golf tips and tournament highlights. Due to constantly being on the road, she had to attend school online.

By 2024, DeGasperis was based in West Palm Beach, Florida. In June, she received a sponsor exemption to participate in the 2024 Island Resort Championship as the only amateur in the tournament. She later participated in the first and second iterations of the Creator Classic. In October 2025, DeGasperis stated that she had been playing in minor league and professional events weekly, typically being the only woman in the tournament.
