= Sydney Towle =

American social media influencer (1999–2026)

- Born: Sydney Elizabeth Towle; November 15, 1999; Newburyport, Massachusetts, U.S.
- Died: August 5, 2026 (aged 26); Bethesda, Maryland, U.S.
- Education: Dartmouth College
- Occupation: Social media influencer
- Years active: 2023–2026

Sydney Elizabeth Towle (/ˈtoʊl/ TOHLL; November 15, 1999 – August 5, 2026) was an American social media content creator who gained recognition for documenting her experience with metastatic cholangiocarcinoma, a rare bile duct cancer, which she began documenting in August 2023. She received online hate from groups who alleged that she did not have cancer, although her cancer was confirmed. She died of complications of her cancer on August 5, 2026.

== Early life ==
Towle was born on November 15, 1999, in Newburyport, Massachusetts, to Elizabeth (née Morrow) and Philip Towle. She had a brother named Austin. She grew up in Hobe Sound, Florida, and attended South Fork High School, where she was a cross country runner. She attended Dartmouth College, where she studied government and environmental studies. Her father died in 2016.

== Social media career and illness ==
Towle became an influencer on TikTok during her sophomore year of college and accrued more than 450,000 followers. In 2023, she noticed a bulge in her abdomen, and a month later, it began to hurt. In August 2023, she posted a tearful video announcing she had received a diagnosis of late-stage cholangiocarcinoma, an aggressive and rare cancer of the bile duct.

After her announcement, she began to create content focused on her life with cancer, including exploring New York City, where she had moved to be closer to Memorial Sloan Kettering Cancer Center, and dealing with symptoms of her illness. One of her videos featured her at a chemotherapy appointment. Another featured her scuba diving. By March 2025, while her following continued to grow to more than 750,000, she also began receiving online hate from groups speculating falsely that she did not have cancer. Some individuals in these groups contacted the companies she partnered with and the cancer center where she was treated. In response to her critics, she stated, "I'm sorry they are so angry that living with cancer can look different than they think it should."

That same year, she was a featured speaker at the Cholangiocarcinoma Conference. She also set up a GoFundMe campaign to fundraise for her mother, who had been laid off by DOGE. This resulted in opposition from her critics. She also spoke at the Business of Fashion Business of Beauty Global Forum.

In January 2026, she reflected on her mental health and infertility caused by chemotherapy, and in February 2026, she stated she felt like she was "slowly fading away from life and reality". In March 2026, she received news that her tumors had grown, which "hit harder than it normally does", but she stated that she was "still very hopeful". In April 2026, one of her tumors was removed, which she revealed in a video featuring her with a wand and tiara.

In May 2026, she posted content of herself in the hospital, along with an essay on love and accepting help. Also in May, she learned her cancer had spread to her peritoneum. Days later, her oncologist suggested she consider entering end-of-life care. She sought a second opinion instead. She also modeled for Miami Swim Week around the same time, saying that she wanted others to feel that "no matter the scars you have, you are beautiful. Your scars make you even more beautiful." Tumors were found in her lungs two weeks later.

=== Death ===
In June 2026, she announced that it had become too difficult to live on her own and that she would move in with her mother. On August 4, 2026, her brother announced she had entered hospice. She died the following day at the National Institutes of Health in Bethesda, Maryland, from complications of her cancer, at the age of 26. Two months later, her ashes were scattered in Hobe Sound, Florida, from a boat by her brother.
