= Miami Swim Week =

Annual fashion week in Miami Beach, Florida

Miami Swim Week is an annual fashion week held in Miami Beach, Florida, United States. The event focuses on swimwear and resort wear collections and takes place each summer, typically between late May and July. The week features runway shows, designer presentations, trade exhibitions, and brand activations across venues throughout Miami Beach and the surrounding Miami area.

== History ==
=== Early years and IMG era (2003–2014) ===
Swimwear presentations in Miami were organized independently by brands and designers in hotels and beachfront venues across Miami Beach throughout the 1990s and early 2000s. Among the earliest dedicated production companies was Funkshion, which launched fashion shows in Miami Beach in 2003 and added swimwear-specific programming in 2004.

Also in 2004, IMG Fashion was commissioned by the Greater Miami Convention and Visitors Bureau to bring a large-scale runway platform to South Beach. The resulting event, branded Mercedes-Benz Fashion Week Swim, was centered at the Raleigh Hotel and became the week's anchor production, attracting international designers, press, and buyers. During this period, concurrent swimwear trade shows also grew in prominence. SwimShow, organized by the Swimwear Association of Florida, was held annually at the Miami Beach Convention Center, while newer trade events such as Cabana and Hammock launched alongside the runway calendar.

=== IMG departure and decentralization (2015–present) ===
In May 2015, IMG announced it would postpone its rebranded SWIMWEEK event until 2016, following the end of Mercedes-Benz's title sponsorship. The announcement initially prompted concern that Miami Swim Week had been canceled entirely, though the trade shows and independent runway productions continued as scheduled. Funkshion expanded from two venues to five for the July 2015 season, while LDJ Productions launched a separate event called SWIMMIAMI at additional South Beach hotels.

IMG did not return to a central role in subsequent years, and Miami Swim Week evolved into a decentralized collection of independent productions held during the same period. In July 2018, Funkshion rebranded its platform as Paraiso, a multi-day fashion fair encompassing runway shows, brand activations, and music programming in the Collins Park area of South Beach.

Separately, entrepreneur Moh Ducis founded DC Swim Week in Washington, D.C., in 2015 and launched Miami Swim Week – The Shows as a Miami Beach companion event in 2020. By 2025, that event featured over 50 events across more than 20 satellite venues with a lineup of over 150 designers. Ducis died on October 8, 2025, at the age of 46; the organization continued under new management for the 2026 season.

By the mid-2020s, the annual calendar included multiple major production groups — Paraiso Miami Beach, Miami Swim Week – The Shows, and Art Hearts Fashion — alongside dozens of smaller events and presentations across South Beach. Most in-person events were canceled or moved online during 2020 due to the COVID-19 pandemic.

In 2026, American content creator Sydney Towle took part in the event's Chemo Club x Post Swim show, where she would walk the runaway. She later died eight months after attending the event following a three-year battle with metastatic cholangiocarcinoma, a rare cancer that forms in the bile duct.

== Trademark dispute ==
The "Miami Swim Week" name has been the subject of an ongoing trademark dispute between DCSW Group LLC and Funkshion Productions (parent company of Paraiso Miami Swim Week).

DCSW Group registered the mark "Miami Swim Week" on the Supplemental Register on November 29, 2022 (Registration No. 6,914,634, Serial No. 90719707). Funkshion Productions subsequently filed a petition for cancellation of that registration, and on February 27, 2025, the Trademark Trial and Appeal Board (TTAB) issued a ruling in Cancellation No. 92081190, ordering cancellation on the ground of likelihood of consumer confusion with Funkshion's claimed common-law use of the same mark.

In April 2025, DCSW Group appealed the TTAB ruling by filing a federal lawsuit in the United States District Court for the Southern District of Florida, case No. 1:25-cv-21578, against FPM Holdings LLC (d/b/a Paraiso Miami Swim Week) and Funkshion Labs LLC. The complaint alleged trademark infringement, fraudulent claims of prior use, and sought judicial review of the TTAB decision. DCSW also challenged Funkshion's own pending trademark application for "Miami Swim Week," alleging it was based on false specimens of use and declarations.

As of April 2026, the federal litigation remains pending. DCSW Group's Registration No. 6,914,634 is listed with a status of "Live/Registered" on the USPTO's Trademark Status and Document Retrieval system, pending the outcome of the district court appeal. Funkshion Productions' own application for registration of the mark "Miami Swim Week" (Serial No. 90744864) has not been granted and remains in pending status before the USPTO.

== See also ==
- Miami Fashion Week
