= Activism against violence against women =

Activism against violence against women aims at decreasing violence disproportionally committed against women.

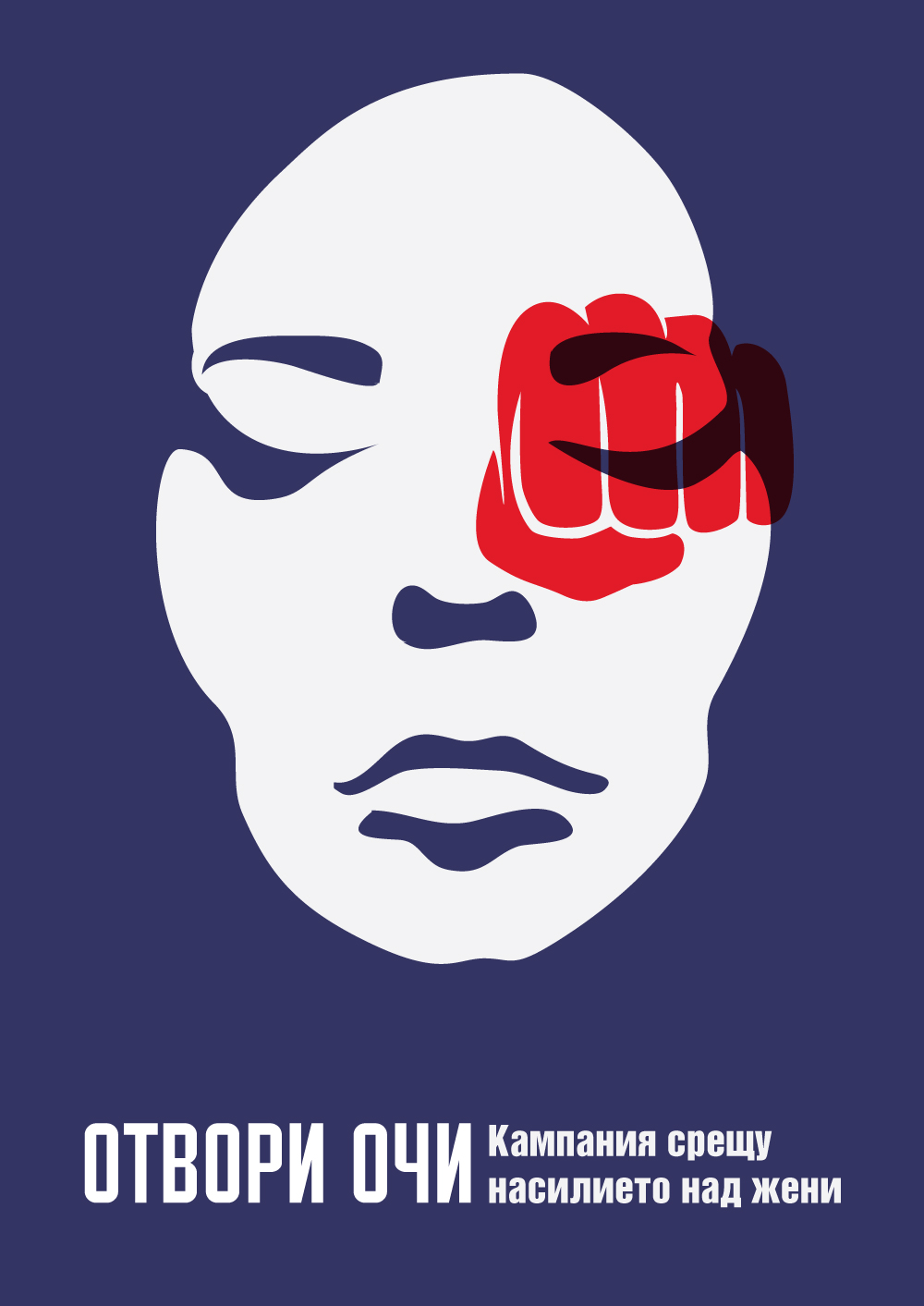
A Bulgarian poster urging people to open their eyes about domestic violence against women

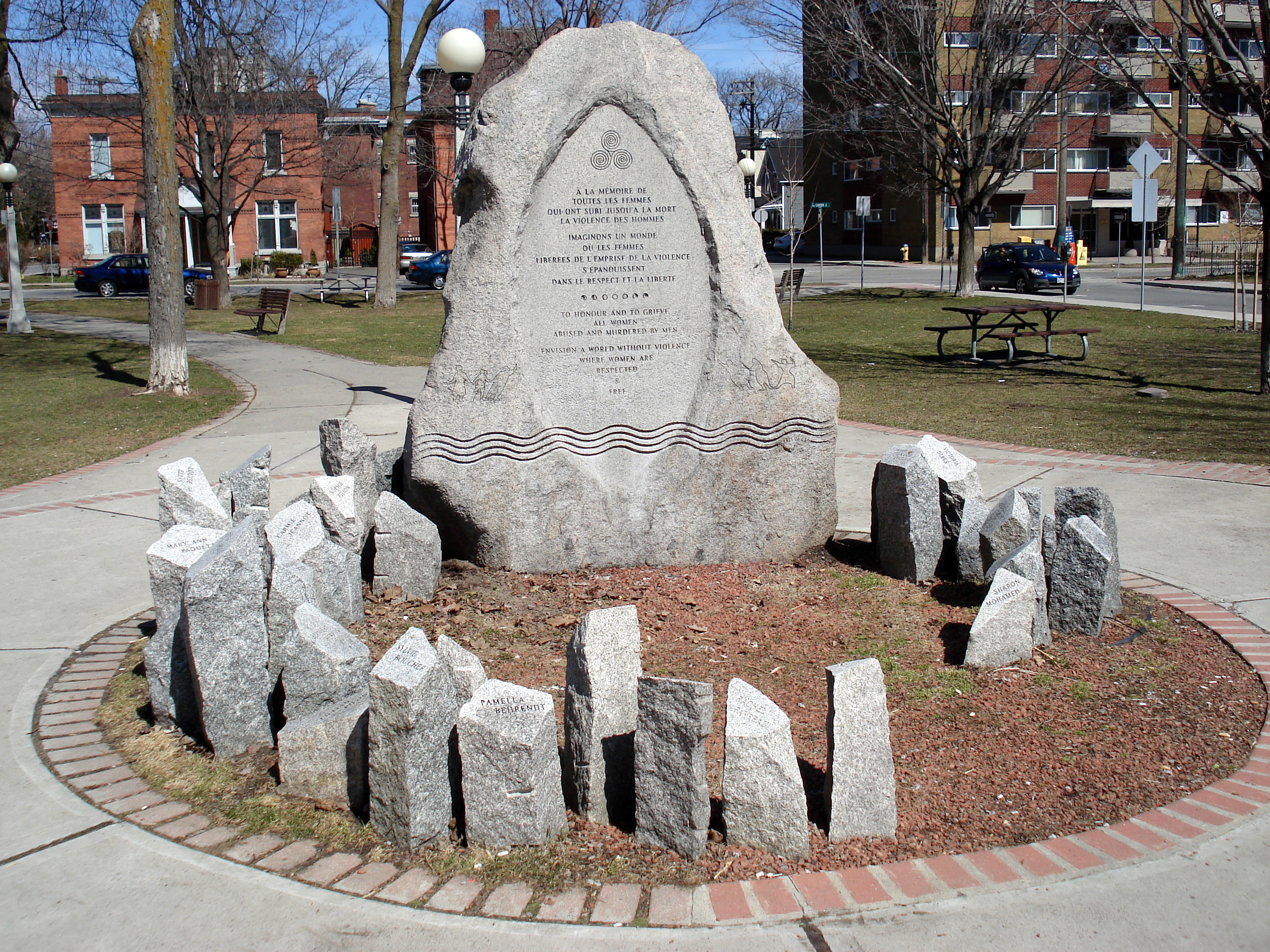
Memorial in Minto Park, Ottawa, of the victims of the École Polytechnique massacre

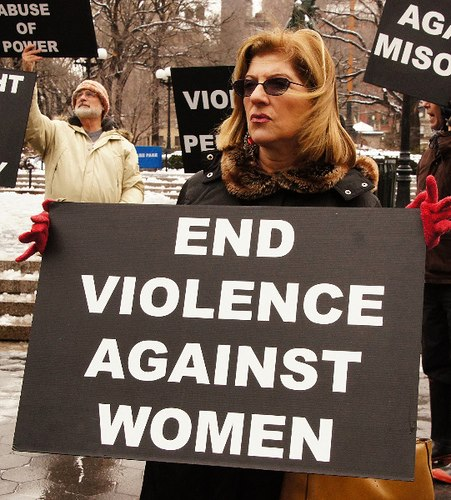
Protest to end violence against women

== Background and history ==
Activism refers to "a doctrine or practice that emphasizes direct, vigorous action, especially in support of or opposition to one side of a controversial issue." In the activism for Violence Against Women (VAW), the objectives are to address and draw public attention to the issues of VAW as well as seek and recommend measures to prevent this violence. Many scholarly articles suggest that the VAW is considered a violation of human rights, as well as a public health issue.

To better comprehend movements against VAW, there is also a need to understand the general historical background of feminist movements in a holistic manner. Many feminist scholars have categorized these movements into three waves according to their different beliefs, strategies and goals.

The emergence of the first women's movements, also called the "first wave" of feminism, dates back to the late 19th and early 20th centuries in the United States and Europe. During this period, feminist movements developed in the context of industrialization and liberal politics, which triggered the rise of feminist groups concerned with gaining equal access and opportunity for women. This wave marks a period of "suffrage, independence, rights to nationality, work and equal pay" for women.

The second wave of feminism was a series of movements from the late 1960s to the early 1970s. It was described by feminist scholars as a period of women's liberation and the rise of a branch of feminism known as radical feminism. This wave of feminism emerged in the context of the postwar period in society, where other mainstream movements also played a large role; for instance, the civil rights movements, which meant to condemn capitalism, imperialism and the oppression of people based on the notions of race, ethnicity, gender identity and sexual orientation. This wave marks a period of equal rights at home and in the workplace as well as developmental rights for the purposes of people of different races, ethnicities, economic statuses and gender identities.

Third wave feminism is the newest wave of feminism, led by young feminists whose understanding and context are of the globalized world order and the technological advances that have come with it. This wave is a transition from the fall of communism to more complex issues of new kinds of 'warfare', threats and violence. This new wave also "embraces ambiguity" and introduces a feminist approach of 'intersectionality' that includes the issues of race, gender, age and class. Other than that, the third wave marks a period of feminism dealing with identity politics and body politics, as well as the issues of violence.

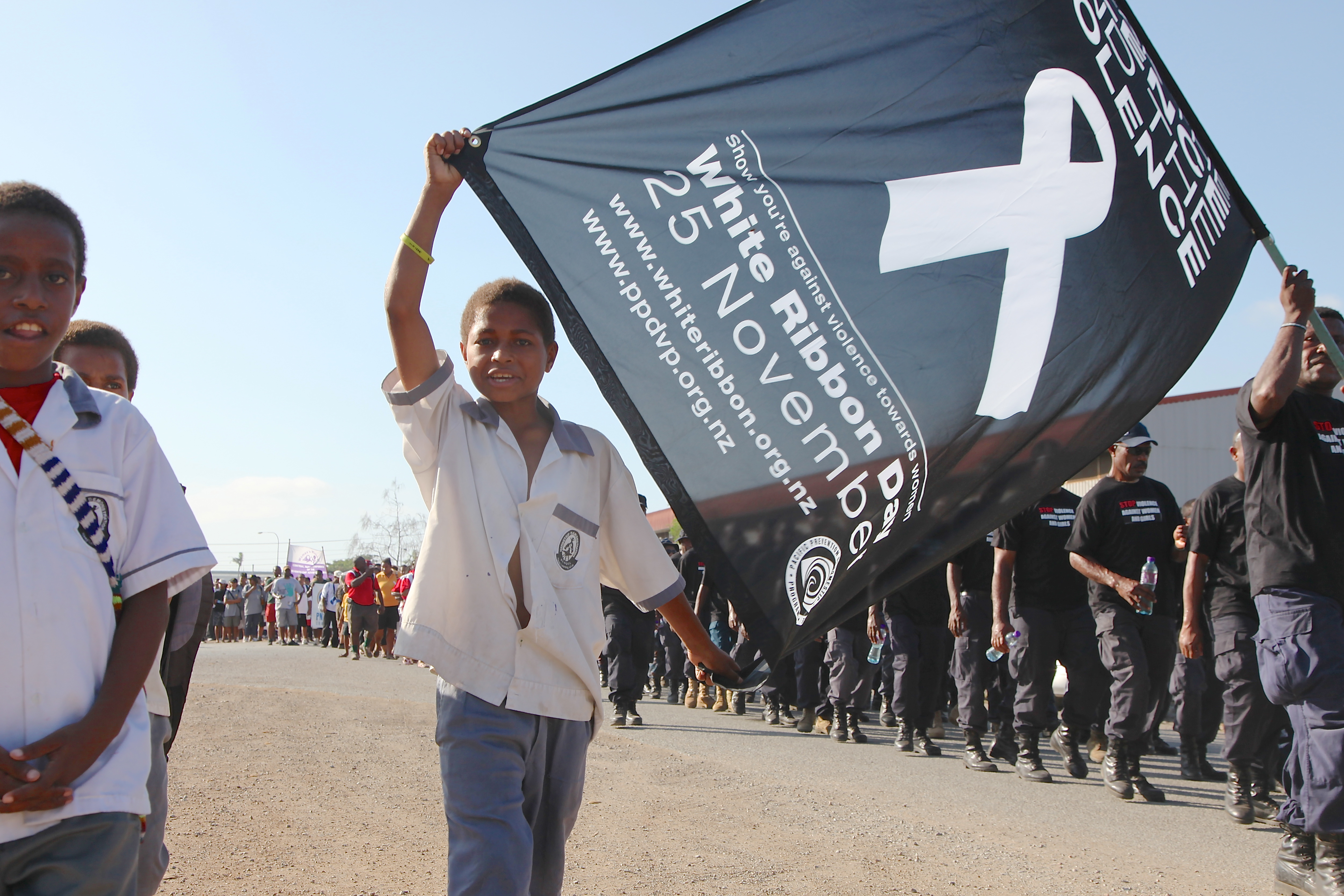
Papua New Guineans show their support for putting an end to violence against women during a White Ribbon Day march.

The VAW movement was initiated in the 1970s when some feminist movements started to bring the discussion on the issue of violence into the feminist discourse and that many other groups, on the national and international levels, had attempted to push for the betterment of women through lobbying of the state officials and delegates, demanding the conferences on 'gender issues' and thus made the VAW known to a wider range of the population. Therefore, to put this into the theoretical context, VAW can be categorized along with the second and third waves of feminism, as they share a focus on violence.

VAW activist movements come in many forms, operating at international, national and local levels, and utilising different approaches based on health and human rights frameworks. The movements stemmed mostly from social movements and groups of women who see the need to create organisations to 'lobby' their governments to establish "sanctuaries, shelters" and provision of services that help protect these victims, also called "battered women", from acts of violence. The term "battered women" was used in a number of VAW movements and had its root in the early stage of organizing efforts to tackle the problem of violence against women in many regions of the world such as Africa, Asian Pacific, Latin America and the Caribbean. The activist organizations against VAW, both with and without the support of their governments, attempted to develop "innovative efforts" to assist battered women by providing them services such as shelters and centers; drafting and lobbying governments to include the recognition and language of VAW into national legislations and international human rights instruments; advocating to raise the awareness of people via education and training sessions; forming national, regional and international networks to empower the movements; organizing demonstrations and gathering more efforts to end violent acts against women. On 14 November 2026, several hundred men assembled outside the Swiss parliament building in Bern to demonstrate against misogyny and violence against women. The rally, titled "Men Against Violence Against Women," was co-organized by social worker Christoph Gosteli and an organization known as maenner. Organizers urged men to take a more active role in confronting misogyny and in efforts to prevent violence against women. In addition, many women's rights activist groups see the issue of violence against women as a central focus of their movements. Many of these groups take a human rights approach as the integral framework of their activism. These VAW movements also employ the idea that "women's rights are human rights", transform the concepts and ideas of human rights, which are mostly reckoned to be "Western concepts" and 'vernacularize them into the concepts that can be understood in their local institutions'.

=== Levels of activist movements ===
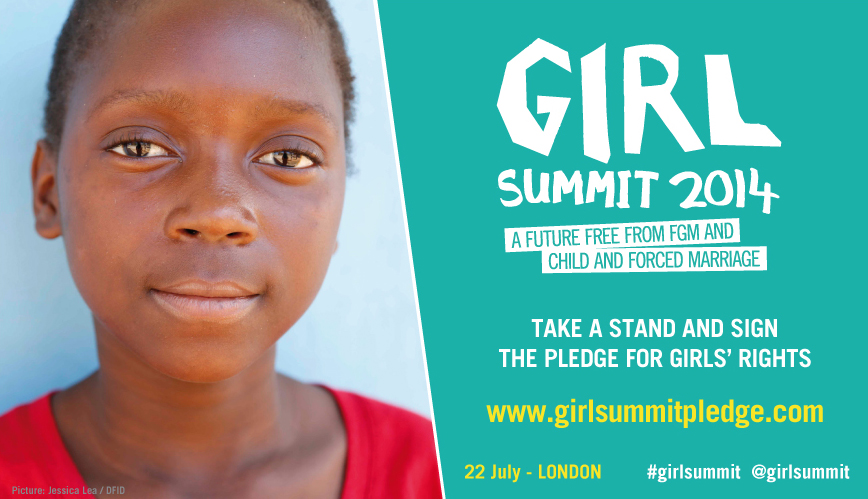
Poster against child and forced marriage

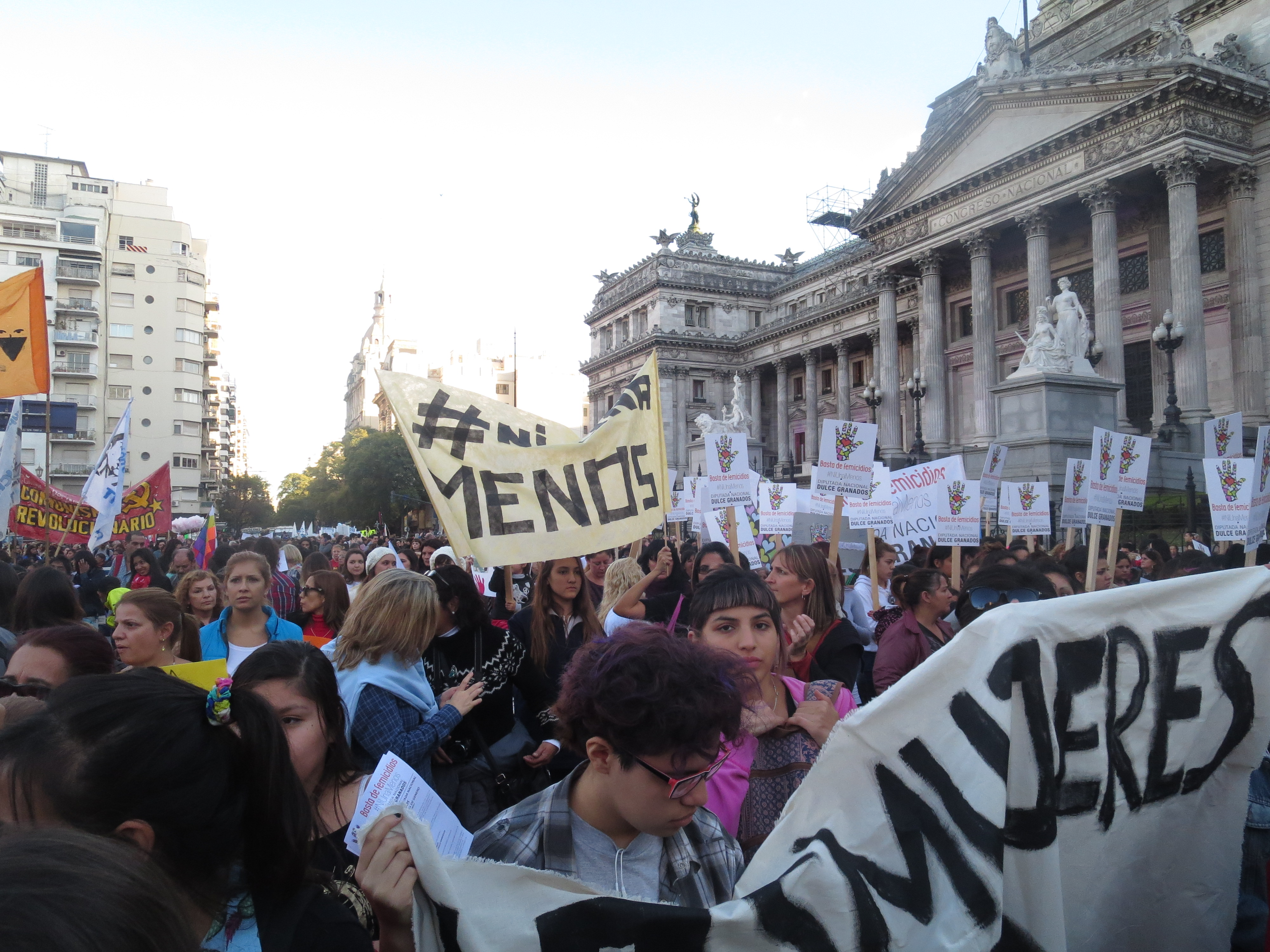
Mass protest against violence against women in Buenos Aires in 2015

On the local or national level, the VAW movements are diverse and differ in their strategic program of intervention. The strategies used in a number of the movements focus on the individual level with the emphases on individuals, relationships and family. Also, many of them take the 'preventive' as an approach to tackle the issues on the ground by encouraging people to "reexamine their attitudes and beliefs" in order to trigger and create fundamental changes in these "deep-rooted beliefs and behaviors". Despite the fact that these strategies can be life changing and helpful to those who participate over a long time frame, the effects on societal level seem to be restricted and of minimal effects. In order to achieve the objectives of the movement, many activists and scholars argue that they have to initiate changes in cultural attitudes and norms on a communal level. An example of activism on the local level can be seen in South Africa. The movements of VAW in this context employ a strategy that is based on the 'prevention' approach, which is applicable on individual and societal levels: in families and communities. This movement encourages the individuals and small populations to rethink their attitudes and beliefs in order to create a possibility to alter these deep-rooted beliefs and behaviours, which lead to the acts of violence against women. Another example is the local level movement in East Africa that employs the prevention approach, which is applicable on a communal level. They call this a "raising voices" approach. This approach employs an 'ad hoc' framework that can be used alongside the individual approach where the strategy is to aggravate the status quo issues onto the individuals' and communities' perception and establish a common ground of interests for them to push for the movement, all in a short time period. In addition, on the domestic level, there seem to be many 'autonomous movements.' Feminist movements (for VAW) can be understood as "a form of women's mobilization that is devoted to promoting women's status and well-being independently of political parties and other associations that do not have the status of women as their main concern".

Several regions of the world have come together to address violence against women. In South America, the Southern Cone Network Against Domestic Violence has worked extensively to address sexual and domestic violence since 1989. The Latin American and Caribbean Network Against Domestic and Sexual Violence, formed in 1990, includes representation from twenty-one different countries and has been instrumental in increasing the visibility of VAW. In September 1999, the Heads of States of the Southern African Development Community (SADC) met and drafted the "Prevention and Eradication of Violence Against Women and Children," a document condemning violence against women and children, and resolved a set of 13 methods of addressing it, reaching into the legal; social, economic, cultural, and political; social service; and education, training, and awareness building sectors.

On the transnational or regional level, the anti-violence movements also deploy different strategies based on the specificities of their cultures and beliefs in their particular regions. On this level, the activist movements are known as "transnational feminist networks", or TFNs. The TFNs have a significant effect, like the autonomous movements on the national level, in shaping sets of policies as well pushing for the recognition and inclusion of language of VAW in the United Nations human rights mechanisms: the international human rights agreements. Their activities are ranging from lobbying the policy makers; organizing demonstrations on the local and regional levels; to creating institutional pressure that could push for changes in the international institutional measures.

On an international level, the movements that advocate for women's rights and against VAW are the mixture of (civil society) actors from domestic and regional levels. The objectives of these VAW movements focus on "creating shared expectations" within the domestic and regional levels as well as "mobilizing numbers of domestic civil society" to create "standards in global civil society". The global women's movement works to transform numbers of international conventions and conferences to "a conference on women's rights" by pushing for a "stronger language and clearer recognition" of the VAW issues. In addition, the United Nations also plays a vital role in promoting and campaigning for the VAW movements on the international level. For instance, in 2008 UN Secretary General Ban Ki-Moon initiated and launched a campaign called "UNiTE to End Violence against Women". This campaign "calls on governments, civil society, women's organizations, young people, the private sector, the media and the entire UN system to join forces in addressing the global pandemic of violence against women and girls". Moreover, this campaign also announces every 25th of the month to be "Orange Day" or "a day to take action to raise awareness and prevent violence against women and girls".

Each level of activism is intertwined and has the common purpose to end violence against women. Activism on local levels can significantly affect national, transnational and international levels as well. In a scholarly article on Combating Violence Against Women, the authors illustrated from their research analysis on how the norms of international society can shape and influence policy making on the domestic or national level and vice versa. They argue that there are three mechanisms which have effects on the making of national policies as well as global agreements and conventions: "1) the influence of global treaties and documents such as CEDAW on women's rights" on the national policies, "2) the influence of regional agreements on VAW (particularly after certain tipping points are reached)" on both domestic policies and international conventions and "3) regional demonstration effects or pressure for conformity captured as diffusion within regions" on the international norms and agreements.

=== Targeted campaigns ===
In November 2021, Iamhere international, a group focused on increasing counter-speech on social media, started a 16-day campaign all forms of gender-based violence, particularly cyber violence.

Artists worldwide have addressed violence against women, highlighting the unique manifestations of violence across cultural and political histories. For example, Argentinian Italian artist Natalia Saurin (2020) responds to the Italian newspaper's use of love narratives to justify partner homicide in her mixed media postcard series, "Ti Amo Troppo". In the United States, street artist Sophie Sandberg encourages individuals to chalk their experiences of harassment in the places in which they occurred. Augmented reality comic "Priya's Shakti" addresses victim-blaming attitudes in India in response to the 2012 Delhi gang rape of a middle-caste college-educated woman. Through the utilisation of Hindu mythologies, "Priya's Shakti" tells the story of a rape survivor in a controversial heroic role inviting Indian society to reckon with patriarchal societal views. Artworks addressing violence against women span across artistic mediums and illuminate the issue of violence against women and provoke change in laws and government. In "And So I Stayed" (2021), a documentary film addressing unjustly incarcerated survivors of domestic violence in the United States, co-directors Natalie Pattillo and Daniel Nelson confront the lack of legal understanding of abused women. As a result of the film, Pattillo and Nelson assembled a short film for the court case of Tanisha Davis, a survivor of domestic violence who was unable to receive leniency for the killing of her boyfriend despite years of physical and emotional abuse. In 2021, Tanisha Davis was released from prison, thanks to the "Domestic Violence Survivor's Justice Act" and Pattillo and Nelson's nuanced portrait of Davis through their short film.

The "Violence Against Women Art Map" came to fruition in 2021 as part of a Pennsylvania State University research study by Lauren Stetz to visualize artists' responses to violence against women. Featuring 24 artists globally, the map highlights the diverse ways in which women experience violence as a result of intersectional identity, culture and history. The interactive digital map was co-created through a participatory action arts-based research methodology, using artist interviews and their artworks. Through visual mapping, artists addressing violence against women through their work connected transnationally for the purpose of coalition building.

=== Second order sexual harassment (SOSH) ===
Second-order sexual harassment (SOSH) is the harassment suffered by those who stand with and support victims of violence against women. Addressing this type of sexual harassment is necessary to protect victims of gender violence. Based on scientific evidence, the most effective strategies for addressing gender violence involve promoting bystander intervention, highlighting the importance of safeguarding individuals who offer support to the victims. To empower victims to report and alleviate their sense of isolation, society must ensure the protection of those actively supporting them in breaking the silence. There is pioneer legislation in the world regarding legal issues. In 2020, the Catalan Parliament passed the first legislation in the world against this form of violence under the name of Second-Order Violence. In 2013, the UN General Assembly passed its first resolution calling for the protection of defenders of women's human rights. The resolution urges states to put in place gender-specific laws and policies for the protection of women's human rights defenders, to ensure that defenders are involved in the design and implementation of these measures and calls on states to protect women's human rights defenders from reprisals for cooperating with the UN and to ensure their unhindered access to and communication with international human rights bodies and mechanisms. The United Nations Sustainable Development Goal 5 is also a global initiative with a target to eliminate all forms of violence against women.
