= The Dude Perfect Show =

American television program

- CMT logo
- Genre: Reality; Comedy
- Starring: Coby Cotton; Cory Cotton; Garrett Hilbert; Cody Jones; Tyler Toney
- Country of origin: United States
- Original language: English
- No. of seasons: 3
- No. of episodes: 48

Production
- Executive producers: Rob Dyrdek; Shane Nickerson; Jonathan James; Josh Wade; Jayson Dinsmore (CMT); Matt Trierweiler (CMT)
- Producers: Jeff Toney; Kyle Nolan
- Running time: 21–22 minutes
- Production companies: Superjacket Productions; Night Lobster Productions (season 3); Nickelodeon Productions (seasons 2-3)

Original release
- Network: CMT (2016); Nickelodeon (2017–2019)
- Release: April 14, 2016 – May 8, 2019

The Dude Perfect Show is an American reality and comedy television program that premiered on CMT on April 14, 2016, and moved to Nickelodeon on July 16, 2017. The program stars Dude Perfect members Coby Cotton, Cory Cotton, Garrett Hilbert, Cody Jones, and Tyler Toney.

== Cast ==
- Coby Cotton
- Cory Cotton
- Garrett Hilbert
- Cody Jones
- Tyler Toney

== Production ==
On September 3, 2015, CMT announced that then working title The Dude Perfect Show was green-lit to series. On March 3, 2016, CMT announced that the program would premiere on April 14, 2016. On February 1, 2017, Nickelodeon announced that it had picked up the program for a 20-episode second season. On June 21, 2017, Nickelodeon announced that the program would premiere on July 22, 2017. The second season premiered on Nickelodeon on July 16, 2017, following the premiere of 2017 Kids' Choice Sports. On July 27, 2018, the program was renewed for a third season of 15 episodes.

== Episodes ==
=== Series overview ===
Season	Episodes	Originally released		
Season	Episodes	First released	Last released	Network
1	13	April 14, 2016	June 30, 2016	CMT
2	20	July 16, 2017	February 4, 2018	Nickelodeon
3	15	October 27, 2018	May 8, 2019	Nickelodeon

=== Season 1 (2016) ===
No. overall	No. in season	Title	Original release date	Prod. code	U.S. viewers (millions)
1	1	"Pace Off"	April 14, 2016	101	0.41
2	2	"The Luke Bryan Archery Cart Battle"	April 14, 2016	102	0.38
3	3	"Aaron Rodgers, Chris Paul, and a Panda"	April 21, 2016	103	0.24
4	4	"Dried Perfect"	April 28, 2016	104	0.19
5	5	"Un-Twinning"	May 5, 2016	105	0.17
6	6	"London"	May 12, 2016	106	0.15
7	7	"Bass-elor Party"	May 19, 2016	107	0.25
8	8	"Man School"	May 26, 2016	108	0.31
9	9	"Fire Edition"	June 2, 2016	109	0.23
10	10	"Cold Weather Tested"	June 9, 2016	110	0.20
11	11	"H-O-R-S-E on a Horse"	June 16, 2016	111	0.20
12	12	"Temp Bro"	June 23, 2016	112	N/A
13	13	"The Curse of Coby Cotton"	June 30, 2016	113	0.30

=== Season 2 (2017–18) ===
No. overall	No. in season	Title	Original release date	Prod. code	U.S. viewers (millions)
14	1	"World's Largest Basketball Shot, Surfing"	July 16, 2017 (Note: This episode was advertised as a sneak peek by Nickelodeon.)	212	1.42
15	2	"Velcro Dodgeball, Trust"	July 22, 2017 (Note: This episode was advertised as the program premiere by Nickelodeon.)	201	1.12
16	3	"Beat the Heat, Game Night"	July 29, 2017	216	0.99
17	4	"Twins Birthday Bash, Daddy Daughter Dance"	August 5, 2017	214	1.16
18	5	"DP Jr., Go Kart Soccer"	September 25, 2017	203	1.30
19	6	"Guinness World Records, Catapult"	September 26, 2017	205	1.15
20	7	"Sportscasters, Wakeboarding Flip"	September 27, 2017	207	1.07
21	8	"Sibling Rivalry, Mega Cornhole"	September 28, 2017	220	1.28
22	9	"Battle of the Senseless, Action Photoshoot"	September 29, 2017	210	1.13
23	10	"Double Office Breakdown, Running with the Balls"	October 16, 2017	202	0.95
24	11	"Slow Motion, Martial Arts"	October 17, 2017	211	1.04
25	12	"Chefgician, Science Fair"	October 18, 2017	215	0.90
26	13	"Home Run Derby, Baby Bootcamp"	October 19, 2017	219	0.89
27	14	"Coby's Parade, Brain vs. Brawn"	October 20, 2017	218	0.96
28	15	"Dog Show, Wrestling"	January 7, 2018	213	0.83
29	16	"Fear of Heights, Sit Down Stand-Off"	January 14, 2018	217	0.83
30	17	"Droning for the Future, Giant Pizza"	January 21, 2018	204	0.73
31	18	"Mom Perfect, Spelling Bee"	January 28, 2018	206	0.74
32	19	"Pro Football Experience, Combined Sports"	February 4, 2018	209	0.68
33	20	"Dudes of Destruction, Camping"	February 4, 2018	208	0.65

=== Season 3 (2018–19) ===
No. overall	No. in season	Title	Original release date	Prod. code	U.S. viewers (millions)
34	1	"Trick Shots and Treats"	October 27, 2018	301	0.57
35	2	"Rocket Dudes & Sport of the Future"	February 8, 2019	307	0.69
36	3	"Escape Room & King of the Lake"	February 22, 2019	304	0.67
37	4	"Stunt Dudes & Race Off"	March 1, 2019	308	0.71
38	5	"Guinness & Texas A&M"	April 22, 2019	312	0.56
39	6	"Random Fools Day & Tall Order"	April 23, 2019	315	0.50
40	7	"Bungee Dunk & Dudes Ranch"	April 24, 2019	309	0.56
41	8	"State Fair & Fan Mail"	April 25, 2019	313	0.55
42	9	"Super Heroes & Fun Raiser"	April 29, 2019	310	0.68
43	10	"Face Your Fears & Sport Upgrades"	April 30, 2019	302	0.69
44	11	"RC Planes & DP All Night"	May 1, 2019	306	0.72
45	12	"Outdoor Challenge & Dudes of the Round Table"	May 2, 2019	305	0.72
46	13	"Stars for a Day & Dude Impossible"	May 6, 2019	314	0.78
47	14	"Rough Riders & Ancient Games"	May 7, 2019	303	0.69
48	15	"Court Upgrades & Ballon-a-thon"	May 8, 2019	311	0.72

== Ratings ==
Viewership and ratings per season of The Dude Perfect Show
Season	Network	Episodes	First aired		Last aired		Avg. viewers (millions)
Season	Network	Episodes	Date	Viewers (millions)	Date	Viewers (millions)	Avg. viewers (millions)
1	CMT	13	April 14, 2016	0.41	June 30, 2016	0.30	0.25
2	Nickelodeon	20	July 16, 2017	1.42	February 4, 2018	0.65	0.99
3	Nickelodeon	15	October 27, 2018	0.57	May 8, 2019	0.72	0.65
