= Northern Junior Championship =

Tournament information
- Location: Milford, Connecticut
- Established: 2002
- Course(s): Great River Golf Club
- Par: 72
- Length: 6,850 yards (6,260 m) – Boys; 5,850 yards (5,350 m) – Girls
- Format: 36 holes stroke play
- Month played: August

Tournament record score
- Aggregate: 136 Nick Fairweather (2011)

Current champion
- NaShawn Tyson (Boys), Joanne Lee (Girls)

The Northern Junior Championship is a nationally ranked United States junior amateur golf tournament. The 36-hole stroke play event is contested over two days at Great River Golf Club in Milford, Connecticut and is open to amateur boys and girls under the age of 19 who have not entered their first year of college.

== Past champions ==
- 2022 NaShawn Tyson / Joanne Lee
- 2021 Benjamin James / Jieming Yang
- 2020 Championship cancelled due to COVID-19
- 2019 Benjamin James / Emma Shen
- 2018 Benjamin James / Kyra Cox
- 2017 Mark Turner / Madeline Jin
- 2016 Bobby Weise / Virginia Ding
- 2015 Connor Daly / Alissa Yang
- 2014 Will Bernstein / Elizabeth Bose
- 2013 Evan Grenus / Amy Ding
- 2012 Will Essigs / Megan Khang
- 2011 Nick Fairweather / Nathalie Filler
- 2010 Andy Mai / Eliza Breed
- 2009 Michael Griffin / Katie Partridge
- 2008 Ryan Lee / Mia Landegren
- 2007 Ryan Lee / Elizabeth Monty
- 2006 Daniel Fanion / Megan Landry
- 2005 Cody Paladino / Lauren Cate
- 2004 Brent Paladino / Katie Grobsky
- 2003 Cody Paladino/ Natalie Sheary
- 2002 Steve Galotti / Juli Wightman
