= Tyler Toney =

American social media personality (born 1989)

Tyler "Beard" Toney
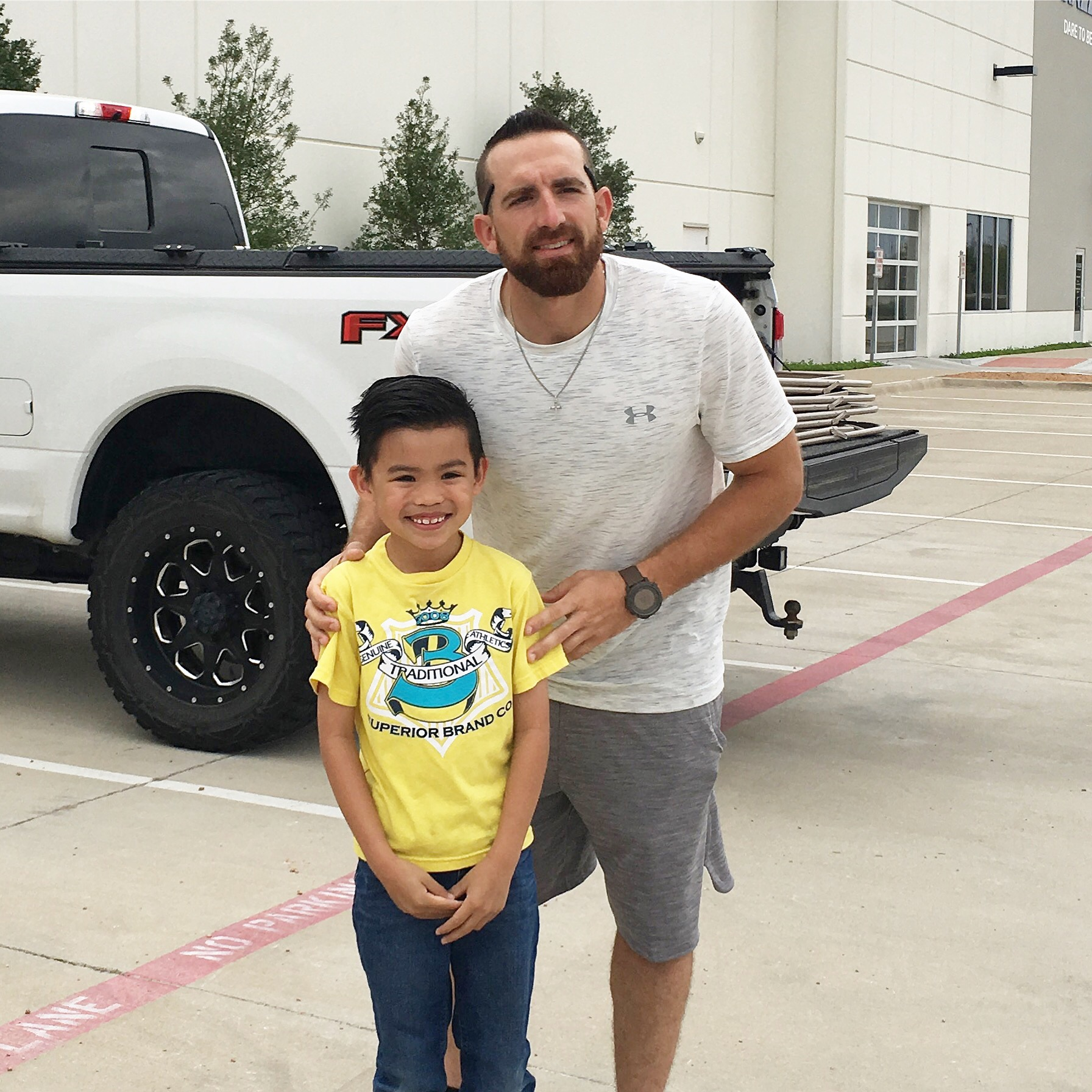
- Toney with a fan in 2018
- Born: Tyler Nathan Toney; March 24, 1989 (age 37); Plano, Texas, U.S.
- Education: Texas A&M University (BS)
- Occupations: YouTuber, entertainer, entrepreneur
- Years active: 2009–present
- Known for: Leader of Dude Perfect
- Spouse: Bethany Briscoe (m. 2011)
- Children: 3
- Website: dudeperfect.com

Tyler Nathan Toney (born March 24, 1989) is an American entertainer, entrepreneur, producer and social media personality. He is a co-founder and on-screen member of the sports and comedy group Dude Perfect, which is known for trick-shot videos, sports challenges and stereotype sketches on YouTube, where he is affectionately known as Beard due to his signature facial hair.

== Early life and education ==
Toney was raised in Prosper, Texas, by his father and mother Jeff and Pam Toney. He played high school basketball and engaged in various athletic activities. After high school, he attended Texas A&M University, where he earned a bachelor's degree in wildlife and fisheries science.

== Formation of Dude Perfect ==
In April 2009, while still at Texas A&M, Toney and his roommates Coby and Cory Cotton, Garrett Hilbert, and Cody Jones posted a basketball trick‑shot video online that quickly went viral. A subsequent video filmed at a Christian summer camp garnered over 18 million views, after which the group pledged to sponsor a child through Compassion International for every 100,000 views, according to statements made at the time. Their early content blended sports, comedy, and family‑oriented values.

Dude Perfect later expanded into television, live tours, and merchandise. Their YouTube channel has surpassed 62.7 million subscribers and accumulated over 21.6 billion views. The channel’s content includes trick‑shot videos, stereotype sketches, and a recurring "battles" series in which members compete in good‑natured contests across different sports.

Tyler regularly appears in Dude Perfect videos and is often referred to by fans as “the bearded guy.” Beyond group content, he has been involved in multiple Guinness World Record attempts, many of which involved basketball trick shots, including record-breaking shots from stadium decks and urban towers. The group currently holds over 20 official world records.

In late 2015, Dude Perfect was greenlit for a television series, The Dude Perfect Show, produced by Rob Dyrdek’s Superjacket Productions. The series premiered on CMT in April 2016 and later aired on Nickelodeon until 2019. The show featured the group undertaking various challenges and comedy sketches.

Beyond their online content and television, Dude Perfect has expanded into live tours, mobile gaming, and documentary projects such as Backstage Pass, which chronicles their first live tour. In 2024, they opened an 80,000‑square‑foot facility in Frisco, Texas with areas designated for public events and interactions. Around that time, they also accepted investment from a private firm and formally hired Andrew Yaffe as CEO to oversee the group's business operations and expansion efforts.

== Personal life ==
Tyler married Bethany Briscoe in 2011; they have three sons. In 2020, their relationship underwent a period of strain during the COVID‑19 pandemic. According to interviews, the couple cited tension between family obligations and work commitments as a challenge during that period. They cited their faith and community support as pivotal in their reconciliation.

Toney identifies as a devout Christian, and both he and the group have stated a preference for family-friendly content and avoiding profanity or alcohol-related themes, something which they believed limited their reach at first, but later contributed to their appeal among families.

Toney is an avid golfer and participated in multiple Creator Classic golf events organized by the PGA Tour, including the inaugural event. He also holds the Guinness World Records record for the longest throw of a golf club.

== Filmography ==
Film

- Dude Perfect: Backstage Pass
- Dude Perfect: Very Long Shot
- Dude Perfect: The Hero Tour

Television

- The Dude Perfect Show
