= Dude Perfect =

American entertainment group

Dude Perfect, LLC
- Industry: Entertainment
- Genre: Sports; entertainment; comedy; trick shots; stereotypes
- Founded: March 16, 2009; 17 years ago at Texas A&M University, College Station, Texas, U.S. (formed); September 9, 2009; 17 years ago in Texas, U.S. (incorporated)
- Founders: Tyler Toney; Coby Cotton; Cory Cotton; Garrett Hilbert; Cody Jones; Sean Townsend
- Headquarters: Frisco, Texas, U.S.
- Key people: Patrick Hurley Interim CEO
- Owners: Tyler Toney; Coby Cotton; Cory Cotton; Garrett Hilbert; Cody Jones

YouTube information
- Channel: Dude Perfect
- Years active: 2009–present
- Subscribers: 62.9 million
- Views: 21.98 billion
- Last updated: November 18, 2026
- Website: dudeperfect.com

Dude Perfect, LLC (DP) is an American sports and comedy group and YouTube channel formed in 2009 and headquartered in Frisco, located in the Dallas metropolitan area of Texas. The group consists of Tyler "The Beard" Toney, "The Twins" Coby and Cory Cotton, Garrett "The Purple Hoser" Hilbert, and Cody "The Tall Guy" Jones. Known as the “Dudes”, the five met as roommates at Texas A&M University. Four members of the group, Jones being an exception, were brothers of the Gamma chapter of the Beta Upsilon Chi fraternity at Texas A&M.

Dude Perfect's content predominantly consists of videos depicting various trick shots, stereotypes, and stunts. The group also regularly uploads videos of "battles", in which the individual members of Dude Perfect compete against one another in a good-natured game or contest, often incorporating different sports and a unique set of rules. Dude Perfect also created the show Overtime, a series where they host several segments, such as "Wheel Unfortunate", in which a contestant spins a wheel and gets a random penalty, "Cool Not Cool", a show-and-tell-like segment, and "Absurd Recurds", in which the Dudes attempt to break the most absurd world records they can find, and also Top 10, a show with the top ten of certain categories, such as cereals, pirates, etc.

== History ==
=== Early years ===
On April 9, 2009, a video of the group performing trick shots at Tyler Toney's house and a local public park was released on YouTube under the title "Backyard Stuntmen" (though it has since been renamed as "Backyard Edition"). Within a week, the video received 200,000 views and was mentioned on Good Morning America.

The group's second video titled "Ranch Edition", filmed at a Christian summer camp, was released shortly thereafter. The video amassed over 18 million views and went viral. For every 100,000 views the video received, Dude Perfect pledged to sponsor a child from Compassion International.

In 2010, Dude Perfect introduced the Panda mascot. The Panda quickly grew into a popular symbol at Texas A&M basketball games when taunting players of the opposing team.

=== Collaborations ===
In 2016, Dude Perfect traveled to the United Kingdom to film a video with players of Manchester City, Arsenal and Chelsea. The group also got a chance to visit the US Navy's Nimitz-class aircraft carrier USS Nimitz for a 3-day trip aboard and released their trip's video as an episode as part of their Bucket List. Dude Perfect also visited South Africa in their second bucket list video. In 2021, Dallas Mavericks center Boban Marjanovic made a guest appearance. On September 24, 2025, American drive-thru coffeehouse chain 7 Brew announced that it would be partnering with Dude Perfect, with plans for appearances in their content as well as a Dude Perfect-themed beverage underway.

=== Business ventures ===
Cory Cotton authored a book titled Go Big, in which he shared the secrets the group has learned along the way building a business in a world largely influenced by social media.

On June 24, 2015, the group was selected by the Harlem Globetrotters in their annual player draft.

In September 2015, the group was approved for a television series entitled The Dude Perfect Show on CMT, which began airing during the first half of 2016. The show's second season aired on Viacom sibling network Nickelodeon.

In 2019, Dude Perfect went on their first live tour. A year later in 2020, the group also announced their second live tour.

Partnering with YouTube Originals in 2020, Dude Perfect released a documentary: Backstage Pass. The documentary provided a behind-the-scenes look at their live tour: 'Pound It, Noggin'.

During H2 2024 Dude Perfect sold an undisclosed share of the company to investment firm Highmount Capital to raise $100 million in capital for future projects and to modernize the company, introducing a more traditional business structure. This was done to allow the founders to continue to make videos they enjoy while expanding the business with more channels, presenters and content. The firm hired Andrew Yaffe, a former NBA social media executive, who will direct the group on building a team to specialize in developing areas important to the group and will help define the vision of how the group will develop and evolve in the future.

=== World records ===
In 2009, the group set the Guinness World Record for the longest basketball shot after shooting from the third deck of Kyle Field. In October 2010, Dude Perfect extended their record with a "cross-tower" shot from a height of 66 meters (216 feet); the basket was located 45 meters (150 feet) away from the tower's base. In March 2011, Dude Perfect unofficially broke their record again with a shot from the top of Reliant Stadium, which remained in the air for 5.3 seconds. In January 2014, the group successfully attempted a shot from the 561-foot-tall Reunion Tower, with Cody Jones and Garrett Hilbert holding the basket at the base of the tower. In their 2016 video, "World Record Edition", Dude Perfect broke multiple world records. The group broke the world records for longest basketball shot made with the head, highest basketball shot, longest blindfolded basketball shot, and longest sitting basketball shot. Subsequently, they released a sequel based on football the following year, in which they broke even more world records. They later made two more world record videos: archery in 2022 and golf in 2023.

In 2018, Dude Perfect broke the record for longest barefoot Lego walk and longest pea blow during their filming of Overtime. In episode six of Overtime, Dude Perfect broke the record for the farthest distance traveled rolling across exercise balls. In 2019, Dude Perfect broke the world record for most ping pong balls stuck on a person's head using shaving cream, and the most donuts stacked on each other while blindfolded. In 2020, they broke another record for the most beach ball header passes in 30 seconds.

In 2019, on Nickelodeon's The Dude Perfect Show, the group set 6 world records: fastest time to wrap a person with wrapping paper (team of two), most party poppers popped in 30 seconds (team of two), most thumbtacks inserted into a corkboard in a minute, most eggs crushed with the toes in 30 seconds, most drink cans opened with one hand in a minute, farthest distance traveled on Swiss balls.

In 2023, in Las Vegas, the group once again broke the record of the world's highest basketball shot from a height of 856 feet from the Strat Tower. Dude Perfect spent three days in Las Vegas trying to pull off the feat and they were able to do it in the last hour of filming.

Dude Perfect currently holds more than 20 Guinness World Records.

=== Awards ===
Award	Year	Category	Result
Streamy Award	2014	Best Sports Series	Nominated
Streamy Award	2015	Best Sports Series	Won
Streamy Award	2016	Best Sports Series	Nominated
Streamy Award	2020	Best Sports Series	Nominated
Streamy Award	2017	Best Branded Video	Nominated
Shorty Awards	2016	Best YouTube Ensemble	Nominated
Shorty Awards	2018	Best YouTube Ensemble	Nominated
Shorty Awards	2018	Creator of the Decade	Nominated
Kids Choice Awards	2020	Favorite Male Social Star	Nominated
Teen Choice Awards	2015	Choice Web Star: Comedy	Nominated
Sports Emmy Awards	2024	Outstanding Interactive Experience	Won

==== 50 Million 'Ruby' Creator Award ====
Dude Perfect, along with over 20 other creators, never received a formal award from YouTube for passing 50 million subscribers. However, an award was conceived and created by fellow YouTuber Daniel Kraft who acknowledged the work and dedication the group has done for the YouTuber community over the years.

=== Other channels ===
In addition to their main channel, Dude Perfect have launched additional channels such as Dude Perfect Plus, Dude Perfect Gaming, Dude Perfect Outdoors and Dude Perfect en Español. The latter features voice actors that dub over each of the Dudes and graphics that can be read in Spanish. Collectively, these channels have amassed 2.07 million subscribers and garnered 195.8 million views in total, as of January 2026.

=== Recent years ===
On December 18, 2022, Dude Perfect announced their intention to build a $100 million Dude Perfect World Theme Park that is designed to give fans a hands-on experience of the group's signature activities, such as attempting trick shots, setting world records, and releasing stress in a "rage room." Their goal is to create a space where fans can feel like they are part of the Dude Perfect team.

On January 15, 2024, The Dude Perfect Video App was released on A Parent Media Co. Inc. and the Google Play Store and Apple App Store. The app lets users watch unlimited Dude Perfect videos for free, serves only family-friendly advertisements, and provides early access to unreleased videos and behind-the-scenes content. In an interview with Colin and Samir, Coby confirmed that the app had reached over 2 million downloads on all platforms as of Q3 2024.

On January 11, 2025, Dude Perfect revealed their new $3 million headquarters, Dude Perfect Headquarters 3 (DPHQ3). It includes a putting course, a pickleball court, a regulation-size NFL goalpost, a full-sized basketball court with extra moving hoops on the wall for a trickshot challenge, and a golf simulator, among many other things. They are also launching an in-person merchandise store next to main headquarters that has limited-edition hats, T-shirts, and other items.

On February 22, 2025, Dude Perfect hosted their first Trick Shot World Championship, where popular trick shot content creator teams from around the world, including How Ridiculous and Brodie Smith, compete in a series of challenges, with the final challenge being to shoot a basketball shot from the top of Globe Life Field. The contest was won by That’ll Work, a duo entry known for their disc trick shots.

== Legitimacy ==
Amid their success, questions arose over the legitimacy of the group's trick shots. Hosts on Good Morning America discussed the tricks and debated whether they were real, though experts contacted by the show stated they were unable to find evidence of the tricks being fake.

Regarding the doubts, group member Cody Jones said: "We love it when people claim it's fake, because it makes the shots seem even more ridiculously impossible; and we get more publicity and hits on YouTube, so we love the mystery of knowing whether it's real or fake."

== Faith and values ==
The members of Dude Perfect have publicly discussed the role of their Christian faith in shaping their values and approach to teamwork. “We’re about giving back, spreading joy, and glorifying Jesus Christ,” according to their website. The group consistently produces family-friendly content, characterized by clean humor and a collaborative tone. They have also engaged in various charitable initiatives under their Hope Foundation initiative.
