= George Bryan (golfer) =

American golfer, social media personality (born 1988)

George Bryan IV
- Born: George Bryan IV; January 12, 1988 (age 38); Columbia, South Carolina, United States
- Education: University of South Carolina (2010)
- Occupations: Professional golfer, YouTuber, content creator
- Years active: 2010–present
- Known for: Bryan Bros Golf YouTube channel, 3× All-American golfer
- Spouse: Milsom Bryan
- Children: 2
- Website: bryanbrosgolf.co

George Bryan IV (born January 12, 1988), nicknamed G4, is an American professional golfer, social media personality, and content creator. He is best known as one half of the Bryan Bros Golf YouTube channel alongside his younger brother Wesley Bryan, also a professional golfer. A three-time All-American at the University of South Carolina, George holds the school record for lowest career scoring average and was the university's Co-Male Athlete of the Year in 2010.

== Early life and amateur career ==
George Bryan IV was born on January 12, 1988, in Columbia, South Carolina, to George Bryan III and Valerie Bryan. His father, George Bryan III, is a PGA Professional who operates the George Bryan Golf Academy and competed in the 1999 PGA Championship and 2004 RBC Heritage. His younger brother Wesley Bryan is also a professional golfer.

George attended Dutch Fork High School in Irmo, South Carolina, where he was a standout golfer, earning all-state and all-region honors each year. As a junior golfer, he won the Jay Haas Player of the Year Award in 2005 after finishing first in the South Carolina Heritage Classic Foundation Player Rankings. He qualified for the 2005 U.S. Amateur and advanced to match play, and also competed in the British Amateur in 2006.

== College career ==
Bryan attended the University of South Carolina from 2006 to 2010, where he became one of the most successful golfers in program history. He majored in sport and entertainment management and graduated in 2010.

=== Collegiate achievements ===
- Three-time All-American (2008, 2009, 2010) - Only the third golfer in South Carolina history to achieve this distinction
- Three-time All-SEC selection (First Team 2008, Second Team 2009, First Team 2010)
- South Carolina Co-Male Athlete of the Year (2010), shared with future MLB All-Star Whit Merrifield
- School record holder for lowest career scoring average (72.37)
- Single-season record for lowest scoring average (71.35 in 2009-10)

=== Notable collegiate performances ===
During his senior season (2009–10), Bryan tied for medalist honors at the SEC Championship with a score of 204 (-6), losing in a playoff to Georgia's Russell Henley. He won the Schenkel E-Z-Go Invitational in 2008, his first collegiate victory, and was named national Golfer of the Week by both Golfweek and Golf World. Bryan competed in every event during the 2007–08 season and helped lead South Carolina to multiple team titles.

== Professional career ==
=== Early professional years ===
Bryan turned professional in 2010 following his graduation from South Carolina. Despite his decorated amateur career, he struggled to find consistent success on professional tours, playing primarily on mini-tours and making limited appearances on the Korn Ferry Tour (formerly Web.com Tour). He has secured two victories as a professional golfer on various developmental tours.

=== PGA Tour career ===
Bryan's PGA Tour debut came at the 2023 Butterfield Bermuda Championship, where he received a sponsor's exemption. After making the cut "on the number," he tied for 69th place and earned $13,325.

His second PGA Tour appearance came at the 2024 Myrtle Beach Classic, where he again received a sponsor's exemption after initially missing the Monday qualifier. He shot rounds of 73-70 (+1) and missed the cut by three shots.

=== Q-School attempts ===
Bryan has made multiple attempts to earn his PGA Tour card through Q-School, reaching the second stage three times but never advancing to the final stage. In 2024, he advanced to the second stage after tying for 15th in the first stage with a score of 281 (-3).

== Bryan Bros Golf ==
In 2014, George and Wesley Bryan launched their YouTube channel "Bryan Bros Golf," which initially focused on trick shots and instructional content. The channel has grown to over 974,000 subscribers on YouTube, with additional followings of 462,000 on Instagram and 60,000 on TikTok. George serves as the "set up man" and technical producer for the videos, while Wesley typically performs the trick shots.

The Bryan Bros were named Official Ambassadors of the Myrtle Beach golf community in January 2024 in partnership with Golf Tourism Solutions. Their content has evolved from pure trick shots to instructional videos, course vlogs, and behind-the-scenes looks at professional golf.

Alongside his brother, in August 2025, Bryan participated in the inaugural Internet Invitational Youtube golf event organized by Barstool Sports. They also participated in the first two Creator Classic events organized by the PGA Tour.

=== Business ventures ===
The Bryan brothers recently purchased a golf course outside Columbia, South Carolina, with the help of business partner Greg Middleton. They use their social media platform to promote the course and grow their brand beyond digital content.

== Personal life ==
Bryan is married to Milsom Bryan and resides in Aiken, South Carolina. The couple has two children: daughter Annie (born c. 2021) and son George Bryan V, nicknamed "G5" (born May 2024). Bryan is a Christian and often references his faith on social media.

His wife Milsom is frequently featured in Bryan Bros content and supports his golf career. During his 2024 Myrtle Beach Classic appearance, his young daughter Annie was heard shouting "Go, Daddy!" from the gallery, creating a memorable moment for the family.

== Awards and honors ==
=== Collegiate ===
- Three-time All-American (2008, 2009, 2010)
- Three-time All-SEC (2008, 2009, 2010)
- GCAA PING All-Southeast Region (2008, 2009, 2010)
- South Carolina Co-Male Athlete of the Year (2010)
- University of South Carolina career scoring average record holder (72.37)
- SEC Golfer of the Week (March 17, 2008)
- National Golfer of the Week - Golfweek and Golf World (March 17, 2008)

=== Professional ===
- Two professional victories on developmental tours
- PGA Tour cut made (2023 Butterfield Bermuda Championship)

== Media and recognition ==
Bryan's unique position as both a competitive golfer and content creator has earned him recognition in golf media. His 2023 PGA Tour debut was widely covered, with Golf Digest featuring him on "The Loop" podcast to discuss his experience. His story of pursuing professional golf while building a social media empire has been profiled by multiple golf publications and websites.

== See also ==
- Wesley Bryan - His brother and PGA Tour winner
- Bryan Bros Golf - Their joint YouTube channel and brand
- University of South Carolina Gamecocks - College golf program
