= Jen Hale =

American sports reporter

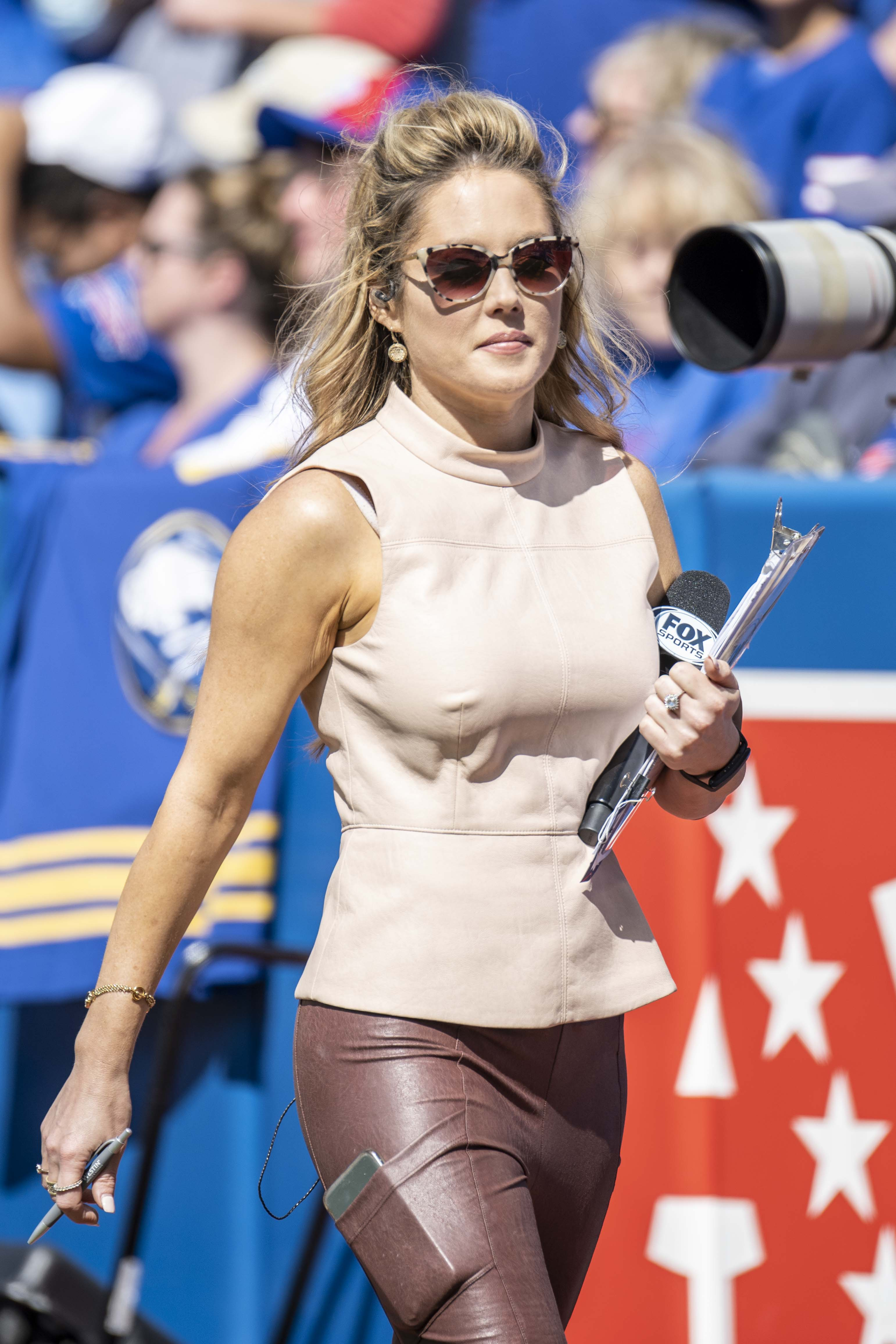
- Hale at Highmark Stadium in September 2021
- Born: Jennifer Hale; February 28, 1978 (age 48); New Orleans, Louisiana
- Education: Louisiana State University; Northwestern University
- Occupations: Sideline reporter, journalist, author, TV host
- Employer(s): Fox Sports; Bally Sports New Orleans

Jennifer Hale (born February 28, 1978) is an American journalist working for Fox Sports as an NFL sideline reporter where she is currently paired with Chris Myers and Mark Schlereth. She also covers NBA's New Orleans Pelicans for Bally Sports New Orleans and also covers college football for Fox Sports. She was a substitute host on the Fox Sports 1 shows Skip and Shannon: Undisputed and Lock It In before becoming the full-time moderator for Undisputed in 2022 to 2023. She has covered The Basketball Tournament for ESPN as well as the Westminster Kennel Club Dog Show. She also worked as a sideline reporter for TNT's coverage of the first round of the 2017 NBA playoffs.

== Early life and education ==
Hale is a native of New Orleans, and was raised in Alabama. She graduated from Louisiana State University with honors where she was captain of the cheerleading squad, homecoming queen, and Miss LSU. Hale interned for CNN in their Washington D.C. bureau. She also got her Master's from Northwestern University's Medill School of Journalism and spent time in Germany on a fellowship to study the US–Germany relationship after the fall of Communism.

== Career ==
Hale started her journalism career covering politics for KNOE-TV, a station in Monroe, Louisiana, which sent her to Baton Rouge as their capitol correspondent, then she went to WAFB, also in Baton Rouge. When she was a weekend anchor and reporter for WVTM in Birmingham, Alabama, she wrote a book called Historic Plantations of Alabama's Black Belt in 2009. She also was a fill-in correspondent for MSNBC during her time in Birmingham. Prior to her Fox Sports career, she was an anchor on WVUE-DT's morning show in New Orleans. She received a call from some friends from LSU to interview former athletes and special guests at LSU football games to put on their website. This and her work with the New Orleans Saints led to people in the Saints organization to recommend Hale to Fox Sports. She added the Pelicans job a year later. She worked as a sideline reporter for TNT's coverage of the first round of the 2017 NBA Playoffs. During the 2019 FIFA Women's World Cup, Hale filled in for Jenny Taft as moderator for Skip and Shannon: Undisputed. She took over as moderator after Taft left the show in February 2022 and was officially named to the position in August 2022. When Undisputed was retooled in August 2023, Hale wasn't a part of the new format. She covered The Basketball Tournament 2020 in Columbus, Ohio for ESPN, staying in the bubble set-up during the COVID-19 pandemic as the only reporter on site.

== Personal life ==
In 2015, Hale launched All Access Sideline Pass, an organization that focuses on educating and empowering young women in the New Orleans community through outreaches and seminars. She started the foundation after encouragement from former Saints running back Pierre Thomas. She also supports Alzheimer's Research, the Speech and Hearing Impaired Foundation among other causes and she's the Women's Health spokesperson for Thibodaux Regional Hospital. Hale was named one of New Orleans's top female achievers by New Orleans Magazine in 2015. In 2018, Hale revealed in a Women's Health article she co-wrote that she was diagnosed with dilated cardiomyopathy during the 2016 NFL season with 16% heart function rate, and she wore a portable defibrillator for six months until medication she took helped get her heart rate back to normal. Since then, she has worked with the American Heart Association, and she is a CrossFit enthusiast.
