= Nick Wright (sportscaster) =

American sportscaster (born 1984)

- Born: Nicholas James Wright; October 3, 1984 (age 42); Kansas City, Missouri, U.S.
- Education: Syracuse University (BA)
- Occupations: Sports television personality; sports radio host; sports podcaster
- Notable credit(s): First Things First; What's Wright? with Nick Wright
- Height: 5'10
- Spouse: Danielle Wright
- Children: 3

Nicholas James Wright (born October 3, 1984) is an American sports television personality, podcaster, and former radio talk show host. Wright is a co-host of First Things First, a talk show on Fox Sports 1 (FS1), alongside Kevin Wildes and Chris Broussard. Signed to The Volume podcast network, he also hosts What's Wright? with Nick Wright with his son, Damonza Byrd. Outside of sports, Wright has also participated in poker competitions.

His presence in the sports media landscape has garnered him both praise and criticism from fellow media members and viewers, who have particularly noted his open fandom for his hometown professional sports teams and basketball player LeBron James, as well as his outspoken views on social issues in sports.

== Early life ==
Nick Wright was born and raised in Kansas City, Missouri. He is of partial Polish-Jewish descent through one of his grandfathers. He also has Irish and Italian ancestry and was raised Roman Catholic. His father was the president of the firefighters' union in Kansas City.

Wright grew up as a fan of the city's local professional sports teams: the Chiefs and Royals of the National Football League (NFL) and Major League Baseball (MLB), respectively. Growing up, he was a season ticket holder of the former. As a ten-year-old, Wright called into Bill Grigsby's Chiefs post-game radio show from the parking lot of Arrowhead Stadium. As the show would not let children on-air, he had his father get him through the show's screeners, before criticizing the clock management of Chiefs head coach Marty Schottenheimer. The show enjoyed Wright's insights so much that he earned a regular segment dubbed Nick the Kid.

He attended Syracuse University's S.I. Newhouse School of Public Communications, graduating in 2007 with a Bachelor of Arts degree in broadcast journalism. While at Syracuse, he worked at WAER-FM as sports talk director. Shortly after graduating, he was a contestant on Who Wants to Be a Millionaire.

== Sports broadcasting career ==
=== Local sports radio in Kansas City and Houston ===
After graduating from Syracuse, Wright began his sports broadcasting career as production assistant and weekend host for the Kansas City-based KCSP 610 AM (610 Sports) radio station, He then began hosting What's Wright with Nick Wright?, his own weekly program on the station. The Pitch, a local Kansas City newspaper, called Wright "610 Sports' most polarizing and likely most popular host," and also named him the best sports personality in 2010. In 2010, Kansas City Star columnist Jason Whitlock appeared on a simulcast television and radio show hosted by Wright. On the show, Whitlock announced his departure from the newspaper and "decided to nuke everybody publicly on the way out". Speaking to The Athletic retrospectively about the incident, Wright stated that Whitlock called into his show uninvited the following year and spoke for "20 minutes basically uninterrupted about how I was pretending to be someone I'm not and how he was sad for me". Wright has stated that the incident made sports journalist Bomani Jones aware of him and that two developed a close friendship in the following years.

Around 2012, Wright opted to not sign a contract extension with the station and moved to Houston, where he co-hosted In the Loop with Nick and Lopez on KILT 610 AM. He credited leaving to Houston to his career goal "or finish line" to be regarded as the "biggest sports talk personality in America", if 100 sports fans were polled "Family Feud style".

=== FS1, First Things First, and What's Wright? ===
Wright parlayed his experience in sports radio into a broadcast television career as he began working with Fox Sports in 2016. His early work at Fox involved regularly contributing to FS1's daily studio shows. He often appeared as a guest host of The Herd. In late December 2016, Wright and former wide receiver Cris Carter co-hosted an episode of The Herd, while its regular host Colin Cowherd was out for vacation. Then-Fox Sports executive Jamie Horowitz used Carter and Wright's co-hosting venture to test their chemistry together, in order to assess the potential of them co-hosting a daily morning sports talk show on FS1. At the time, the early morning block (6:00–9:30 AM EST) was "a black hole for FS1", according to Sporting News, as the network used that slot for game replays and reruns of other shows. Carter and Wright proved to be a successful pairing, as they were then paired up to host FS1's morning talk show First Things First, which premiered on September 5, 2017. Carter and Wright were joined by reporter Jenna Wolfe, who fills the show's moderator and anchor role. First Things First also functioned as a lead-in program for Skip and Shannon: Undisputed. In 2018, it was announced Wright would begin hosting What's Wright, a weekday radio show on Sirius XM's Mad Dog Radio.

In June 2019, Wright received media attention for making an inaccurate claim during an episode of First Things First about the awarding of the 2015 NBA Finals MVP Award to Andre Iguodala. After multiple Finals MVP voters and an NBA representative debunked Wright's version of events, Wright apologized. Wright's negative opinion on Andrew Wiggins as a basketball player also received pushback particularly after the Golden State Warriors won the 2022 NBA Finals, with Wiggins serving as the team's second-leading scorer.

Wright began co-hosting his What's Wright? podcast with his son, Damonza Byrd, in 2022. Wright's podcast was originally signed under Fox Sports, but later signed onto Cowherd's podcast network, The Volume. While discussing Draymond Green on Cowherd's eponymous podcast, Wright disclosed that he himself is a Klutch client.

In August 2024, Wright successfully lobbied FS1 management to hire Danny Parkins, a Chicago radio host and close personal friend of his from their days at Syracuse, for their new morning show Breakfast Ball. Wright later signed a contract extension with Fox Sports in October.

== Poker career ==
Wright made his first poker-related appearance on PokerGO's video podcast No Gamble, No Future, in March 2021. Wright would make his second appearance in June 2021 where it was announced that he would be playing in PokerGO's High Stakes Duel III against Phil Hellmuth on July 28, 2021. It was also revealed that Wright would appear in the upcoming Season 13 of PokerGO's Poker After Dark, alongside poker professionals Hellmuth, Maria Ho, and Daniel Negreanu, as well as mixed martial arts announcer Bruce Buffer. Wright also entered in events at the 2024 World Series of Poker (WSOP).

== Public image and reception ==
Wright's sports comment has received both praise and criticism from media outlets, who have discussed his transparent fandom; most notably, he is a fan of his hometown Kansas City Chiefs and basketball player LeBron James. Media writers have also noted Wright's willingness to discuss social and political issues within a broader sports-related context.

Kyle Koster of The Big Lead wrote, "Part of [Wright's] shtick is not pretending he checks fandom at the door (see: his LeBron James love affair). That's what helps him connect with viewers who, by and large, are sports fans themselves, grappling with the same biases." Meanwhile, Complex's Aaron Mansfield wrote, "First Things First is actually enjoyable, reasonable sports talk, and Wright is a big reason for that," and opined that "[Wright] knows how to build a convincing argument behind statistics." Mansfield added: "The Syracuse grad has differentiated himself in sports media because of his persuasive nature, his defend-LeBron-to-the-death mentality, and his willingness to confront prevalent social issues such as race in America." Wright's opinions on the U.S. national anthem protests sparked by Colin Kaepernick's activism were positively received by German Lopez of Vox, who wrote "Nick Wright has given what is perhaps the best distillation of the topic I have seen on television." Kansas City Star columnist Sam Mellinger has described Wright as "overwhelmingly arrogant, while also somehow self-deprecating, obnoxious but sort of endearing".

Since signing to FS1, Wright's clout in sports media has increased, with some calling him the "face of Fox Sports". In February 2024, sportscaster Dan Le Batard referred to Wright as such, advocating for Fox to "pay that man". Writing a story on Wright's 2024 contract extension, Michael McCarthy of Front Office Sports cited "several well-sourced TV executives" who viewed Wright as the "future of FS1". However, Wright has dismissed the title, calling it "absolutely unequivocally false" and "disrespectful to Wildes and Brou [sic]", his First Things First co-hosts, instead stating that "the face of FS1 is Colin Cowherd".

After the 2026 United States elections, Wright became more vocal about his left leaning political views, appearing on podcasts discussing his support of the Democratic Party and stating how he would like to get more involved with politics in the future.

== Personal life ==
Wright and his wife have one child together, and he has adopted his wife's two children from previous relationships. Kansas City mayor Quinton Lucas is a personal friend of Wright's from high school and later officiated the renewal of his marriage vows. Meanwhile, Wright has developed relationships with Chiefs personnel and players. The team's general manager Brett Veach has called Wright following playoff victories and Chiefs quarterback Patrick Mahomes once sent Wright bottle service at a Kansas City club during a Super Bowl celebration which Wright spent partying with tight end Travis Kelce.
