= Greg Jennings =

American football player (born 1983)

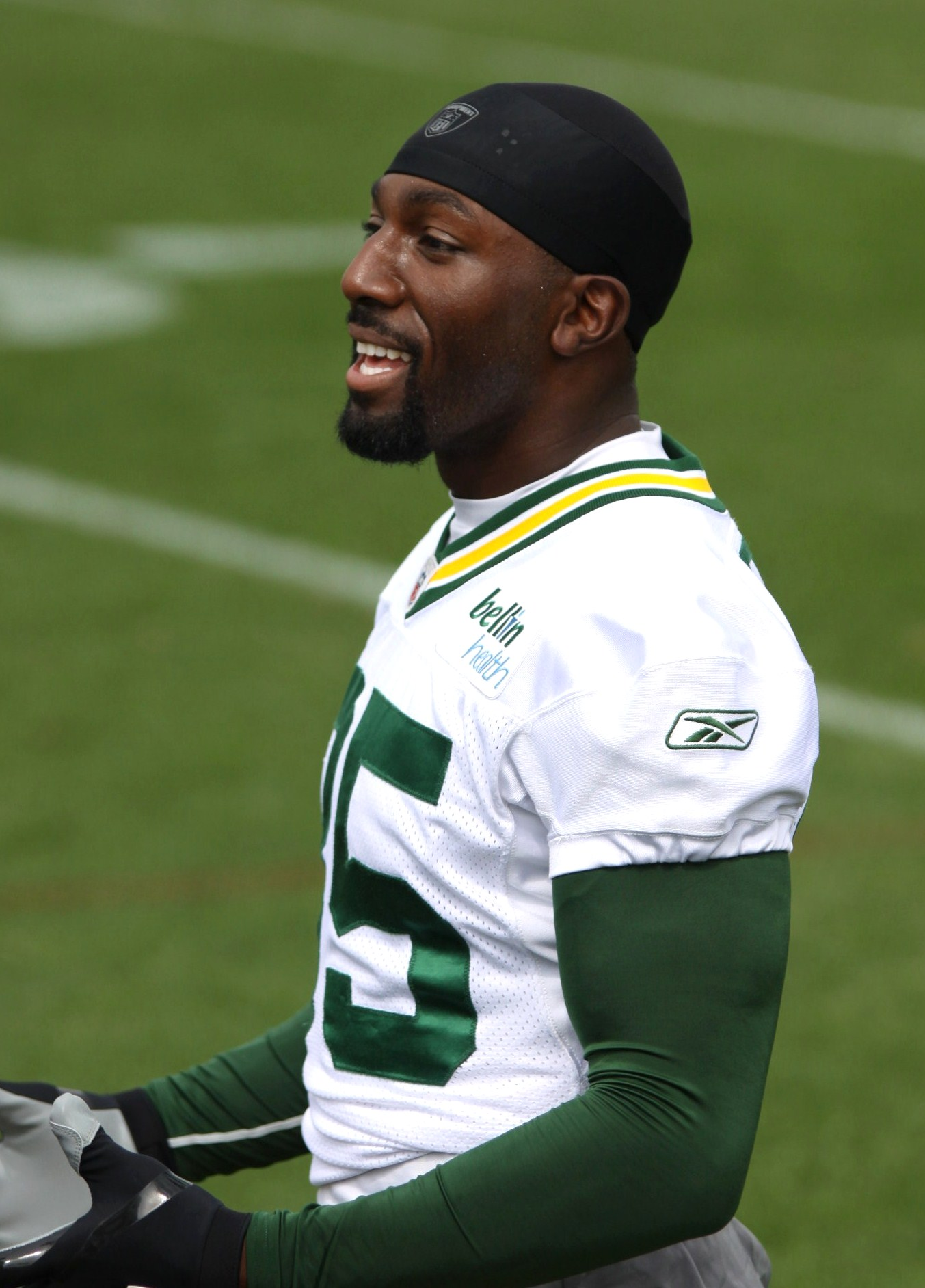
- Jennings with the Green Bay Packers in 2011

No. 85, 15
- Position: Wide receiver

Personal information
- Born: September 21, 1983 (age 43); Kalamazoo, Michigan, U.S.
- Listed height: 5 ft 11 in (1.80 m)
- Listed weight: 197 lb (89 kg)

Career information
- High school: Central (Kalamazoo)
- College: Western Michigan (2002–2005)
- NFL draft: 2006: 2nd round, 52nd overall pick

Career history
- Green Bay Packers (2006–2012); Minnesota Vikings (2013–2014); Miami Dolphins (2015)

Awards and highlights
- Super Bowl champion (XLV); 2× Pro Bowl (2010, 2011); PFWA All-Rookie Team (2006); Green Bay Packers Hall of Fame; Third-team All-American (2005); NCAA receptions leader (2005); MAC Co-Most Valuable Player (2005); MAC Offensive Player of the Year (2005)

Career NFL statistics
- Receptions: 571
- Receiving yards: 8,291
- Receiving touchdowns: 64
- Stats at Pro Football Reference

Gregory Jennings Jr. (born September 21, 1983) is an American sports television personality and former professional football player who was a wide receiver for 10 seasons in the National Football League (NFL), primarily with the Green Bay Packers. He played college football for the Western Michigan Broncos and was selected by Green Bay in the second round of the 2006 NFL draft. Jennings was named to two Pro Bowls during his seven seasons with the Packers and was part of the team that won a Super Bowl title in Super Bowl XLV. In his final three seasons, he was a member of the Minnesota Vikings and Miami Dolphins. He was inducted into Green Bay Packers Hall of Fame in 2022.

After his playing career, Jennings transitioned into sports media. As of 2026, he is a recurring guest football analyst on the Fox Sports 1 (FS1) programs First Things First.

== Early life ==
Jennings was born in Kalamazoo, Michigan. He attended Kalamazoo Central High School where he was all conference in three sports—football, basketball, and track. Jennings played wide receiver, running back, outside linebacker and defensive back as a four-time letterman for the football team. He was listed 11th on the "Fab 50" rankings of the Detroit Free Press as a senior. Jennings finished seventh in voting for Mr. Basketball of Michigan in 2000–01 and scored a school record 50 points in a losing effort against Benton Harbor as a senior.

In track & field, Jennings was one of the state's top performers in the long jump event. He captured the state title in the long jump at the 2001 MHSAA State LP-1 Championships, with a leap of 6.67 meters. He got a PR of 6.92 meters in the long jump. He was also a member of the 4 × 100m (42.20) and 4 × 200m (1:28.50) relay squads.

== College career ==
Jennings attended Western Michigan University and played for the Broncos. He finished his career there with 238 receptions for 3,539 yards and 39 touchdowns. When Jennings was a redshirt freshman, he missed 8 games due to a broken ankle bone. In the 8 games he did play, he caught 10 passes for 138 yards. In 2003, he was second on the Broncos with 56 catches for 1,050 yards and 14 touchdowns. He finished the 2003 season with 1,734 all-purpose yards. He was named to the All-Mid American 2nd team. In 2004, he led the Broncos with 74 catches for 1,092 yards and 11 touchdowns. He tallied 1,415 all-purpose yards. He was named to the All-MAC team. In 2005, he led the nation with 98 receptions and in catches per game, with 8.91. He had 1,259 yards with 14 touchdowns, and earned the 2005 MAC Offensive Player of the Year Award. His 5,093 all-purpose yards is a WMU record, and ranks 8th in MAC history. Jennings became only the 11th player to gain over 1,000 yards in at least three seasons of a college career. Jennings graduated from WMU in 2010 after completing the 16 credits he needed through self-instructional classes.

== Professional career ==
Pre-draft measurables
Height	Weight	Arm length	Hand span	40-yard dash	10-yard split	20-yard split	20-yard shuttle	Three-cone drill	Vertical jump	Broad jump
5 ft 11 1/8 in (1.81 m)	197 lb (89 kg)	31 in (0.79 m)	9 1/8 in (0.23 m)	4.46 s	1.56 s	2.62 s	4.16 s	6.68 s	36 1/2 in (0.93 m)	9 ft 9 in (2.97 m)
All values from NFL Combine

=== Green Bay Packers ===
The Green Bay Packers drafted Jennings in the second round (52nd pick overall) of the 2006 NFL draft. On July 24, 2006, he signed a contract with the Packers.

Jennings was named the starting wide receiver, along with Donald Driver, which put Robert Ferguson in the slot, for his first professional regular-season game Green Bay Packers by head coach Mike McCarthy on September 2, 2006. Jennings led the NFL in receiving yardage during the 2006 preseason. He had 1 catch for 5 yards in his first game.

On September 24, 2006, he caught a 75-yard touchdown pass from Brett Favre against the Detroit Lions. It was Favre's 400th touchdown pass for his career, a milestone reached only by Favre, Dan Marino, Peyton Manning, Tom Brady, Drew Brees, Philip Rivers and Aaron Rodgers. This was also Jennings's first 100-plus-yard game, as he finished with 3 catches, 101 yards and 1 touchdown. Jennings was voted NFL Rookie of the Week for games played September 24–25, 2006, the only time he received this honor. Jennings was also named to the NFL All Rookie team at the end of the season.

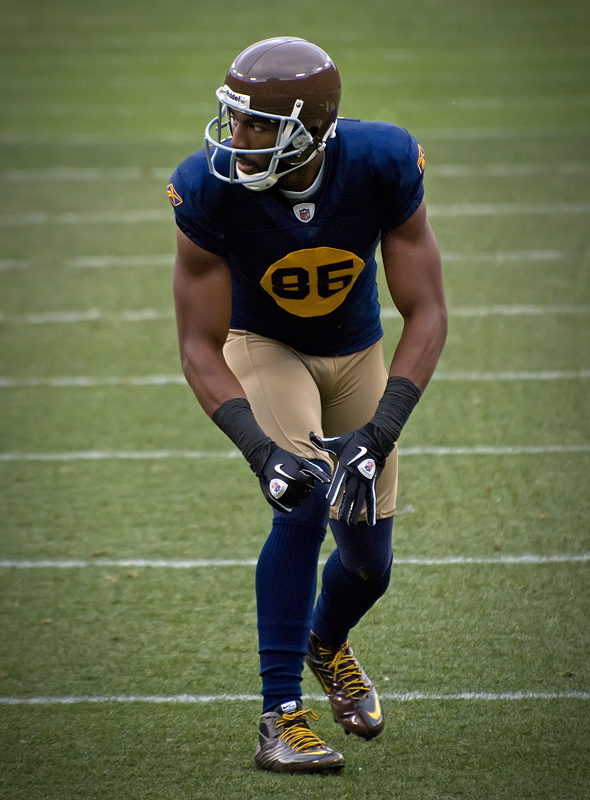
Jennings in 2010

On September 23, 2007, Jennings caught a game-winning 57-yard TD pass from Favre with less than two minutes to play to help beat the San Diego Chargers 31–24 at Lambeau Field and improve the team's record to 3–0 in 2007. This was Jennings's first touchdown catch in 2007, as well as Favre's 420th career touchdown pass, tying him with Marino for the most TD passes in NFL history.

A week later on September 30, 2007, during a 23–16 victory over the Minnesota Vikings, Jennings caught a 16-yard pass from Favre that opened the scoring ten minutes into the first quarter, and broke the all-time touchdown pass record Favre had shared with Dan Marino. On October 29, 2007, Jennings caught an 82-yard touchdown pass from Favre to defeat the Denver Broncos 19–13 in overtime, tying him for the second-longest overtime touchdown in NFL history at the time. Then the following week, he caught the game-winning touchdown pass that went for 60 yards to beat the Chiefs in Kansas City. Against the Cowboys on November 29, 2007, in a game broadcast on the NFL Network, Jennings hauled in the first ever touchdown pass by quarterback Aaron Rodgers.

Jennings and running back Ryan Grant each had a touchdown during a 33–14 victory over the St. Louis Rams on December 16, 2007, making it the first time two Packers players have each scored a touchdown in the same four consecutive games. Jennings collected 80 receptions for 1,292 yards and 9 touchdowns in the 2008 season.

On June 23, 2009, Jennings received a three-year extension which paid him $26.35 million and included $16 million guaranteed. It also included a $11.25 million signing bonus. Jennings caught a game-winning pass on September 13, 2009, on a 3rd and two play, where the Packers ran a play action fake and rolled Aaron Rodgers out to the left, who then threw a 50-yard pass to Jennings to defeat the Chicago Bears in the season opener. In the Packers 2009 Wild Card game against the Arizona Cardinals, Jennings had 8 receptions for 130 yards, scoring 1 touchdown. In the 2010–2011 season, Jennings helped the Packers go 10–6 in the regular season. He was ranked 74th by his fellow players on the NFL Top 100 Players of 2011. In Super Bowl XLV, on February 6, 2011, Jennings caught four passes for 64 yards and scored two touchdowns in the Packers' 31–25 victory over the Pittsburgh Steelers.

Jennings played the first 13 games of the 2011 season before going down with a sprained MCL in week 13 against the Oakland Raiders. During the season, he collected 69 receptions for 949 yards, including a season-high 149 yards on 7 receptions, and a touchdown in a week 7 game at the Minnesota Vikings. He returned for the Packers' divisional round playoff game against the New York Giants and recorded 4 receptions for 40 yards in a Packers' loss.

In 2012, Jennings sat out most of the early season due to a groin injury, and was scheduled to have surgery in Philadelphia, but it was postponed due to Hurricane Sandy.

=== Minnesota Vikings ===
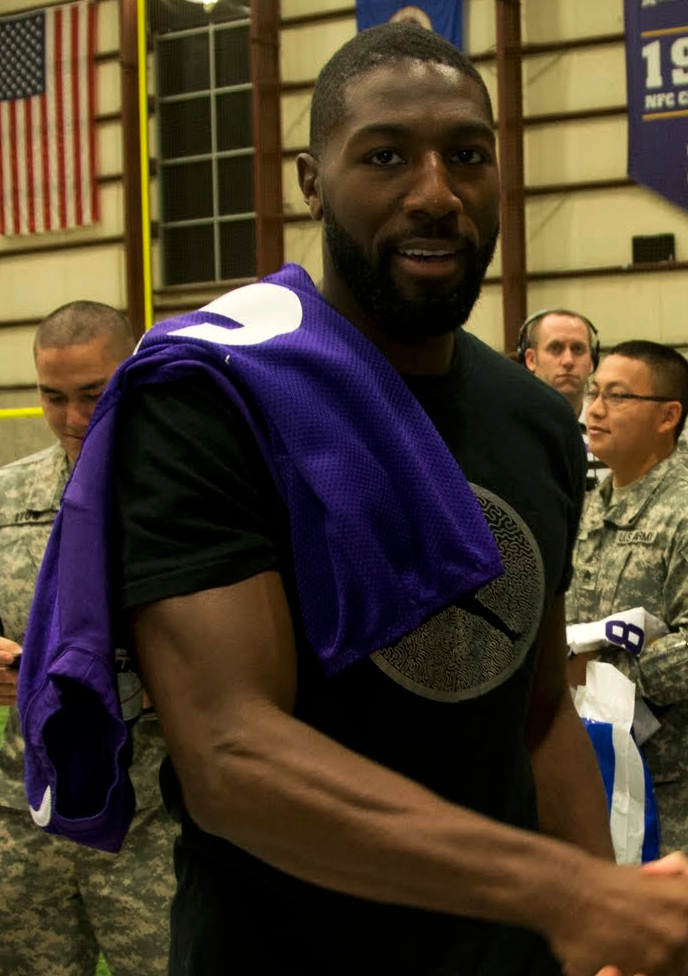
Jennings in 2013

On March 15, 2013, Jennings signed a 5-year, $47.5 million ($18 million guaranteed) contract with the Minnesota Vikings. Jennings got his first two touchdowns as a member of the Vikings against the Pittsburgh Steelers in a 34–27 win. Jennings made his return to Lambeau Field on November 24, 2013, in a 26–26 tie between the Packers and Vikings.

He was released by the Vikings on March 14, 2015.

=== Miami Dolphins ===
On April 22, 2015, Jennings signed a two-year, $8 million contract with the Miami Dolphins.

On March 5, 2016, the Dolphins released Jennings to free up cap space.

=== Retirement ===
On July 25, 2016, Jennings retired from professional football after 10 seasons, at the age of 32.

For his accomplishments in Green Bay, was inducted to the Green Bay Packers Hall of Fame in 2022.

== NFL career statistics ==
Regular season

Legend
	Won the Super Bowl
**Bold**	Career high

Year	Team	Games		Receiving				
Year	Team	GP	GS	Rec	Yds	Avg	Lng	TD
2006	GB	14	11	45	632	14.0	75	3
2007	GB	13	13	53	920	**17.4**	82	12
2008	GB	**16**	15	**80**	**1,292**	16.2	63	9
2009	GB	**16**	13	68	1,113	16.4	83	4
2010	GB	**16**	**16**	76	1,265	16.6	**86**	**12**
2011	GB	13	13	67	949	14.2	79	9
2012	GB	8	5	36	366	10.2	45	4
2013	MIN	15	15	68	804	11.8	70	4
2014	MIN	**16**	13	59	742	12.6	38	6
2015	MIA	**16**	5	19	208	10.9	31	1
Career		143	119	571	8,291	14.5	86	64

Playoffs

Year	Date	Team	Opp.	Result	Receiving				
Year	Date	Team	Opp.	Result	Rec	Yds	Avg	TD	Pts
2007	2008-01-12	GB	SEA	W 42–20	6	71	11.83	2	12
2007	2008-01-20	GB	NYG	L 20–23	1	14	14.0	0	0
2009	2010-01-10	GB	ARI	L 45–51	8	130	16.25	1	6
2010	2011-01-09	GB	PHI	W 21–16	1	8	8.0	0	0
2010	2011-01-15	GB	ATL	W 48–21	8	101	12.63	0	0
2010	2011-01-23	GB	CHI	W 21–14	8	130	16.25	0	0
2010	2011-02-06	GB	PIT	W 31–25	4	64	16.0	2	12
2011	2012-01-15	GB	NYG	L 20–37	4	40	10.0	0	0
2012	2013-01-05	GB	MIN	W 24–10	4	61	15.25	0	0
2012	2013-01-12	GB	SF	L 31–45	6	54	9.0	1	6
Total - 10 Games					50	673	13.46	6	36

Source:Pro-Football-Reference.com

== Personal life ==
Jennings is a Christian. Jennings is married to Nicole Jennings, also of Kalamazoo, and they have three daughters named Amya, Alea and Ayva. On October 5, 2012, they welcomed their son Aice Gregory.

On May 5, 2010, Jennings made an appearance on the CBS prime time hit show Criminal Minds. He portrayed a lab technician working at a crime scene. Jennings is also in discussions to appear on BET's The Game. He appeared as himself on the July 6, 2011, episode of Royal Pains and the 2013 The League episode, "The Near Death Flex-perience".

The Greg Jennings Foundation was started by Jennings to attempt to benefit underprivileged children and youth organizations. The entire charity organization raises money through organizational events, donations, and fund raisers. The organization allows people, groups, and organizations from either Michigan or Wisconsin to apply for grant money. The headquarters of the foundation are in Kalamazoo, Michigan.

Jennings is also a part-time analyst on FS1's First Things First and Breakfast Ball, and formerly on The Carton Show.

== Madden clip ==
Jennings also is known for a viral video of Madden NFL 10 gameplay by Demetry James, where he scores a 99-yard touchdown with Jennings having a broken leg. The Madden series later references James' video in Madden NFL 12, in which if the user playing the game scores a 99-yard touchdown with Jennings, they earn an achievement named "Put Da Team On My Back". The name of the achievement is a reference to a phrase said by James in his gameplay video.

== See also ==
- List of NCAA major college football yearly receiving leaders
