= Jenna Wolfe =

Jamaican-American reporter (born 1974)

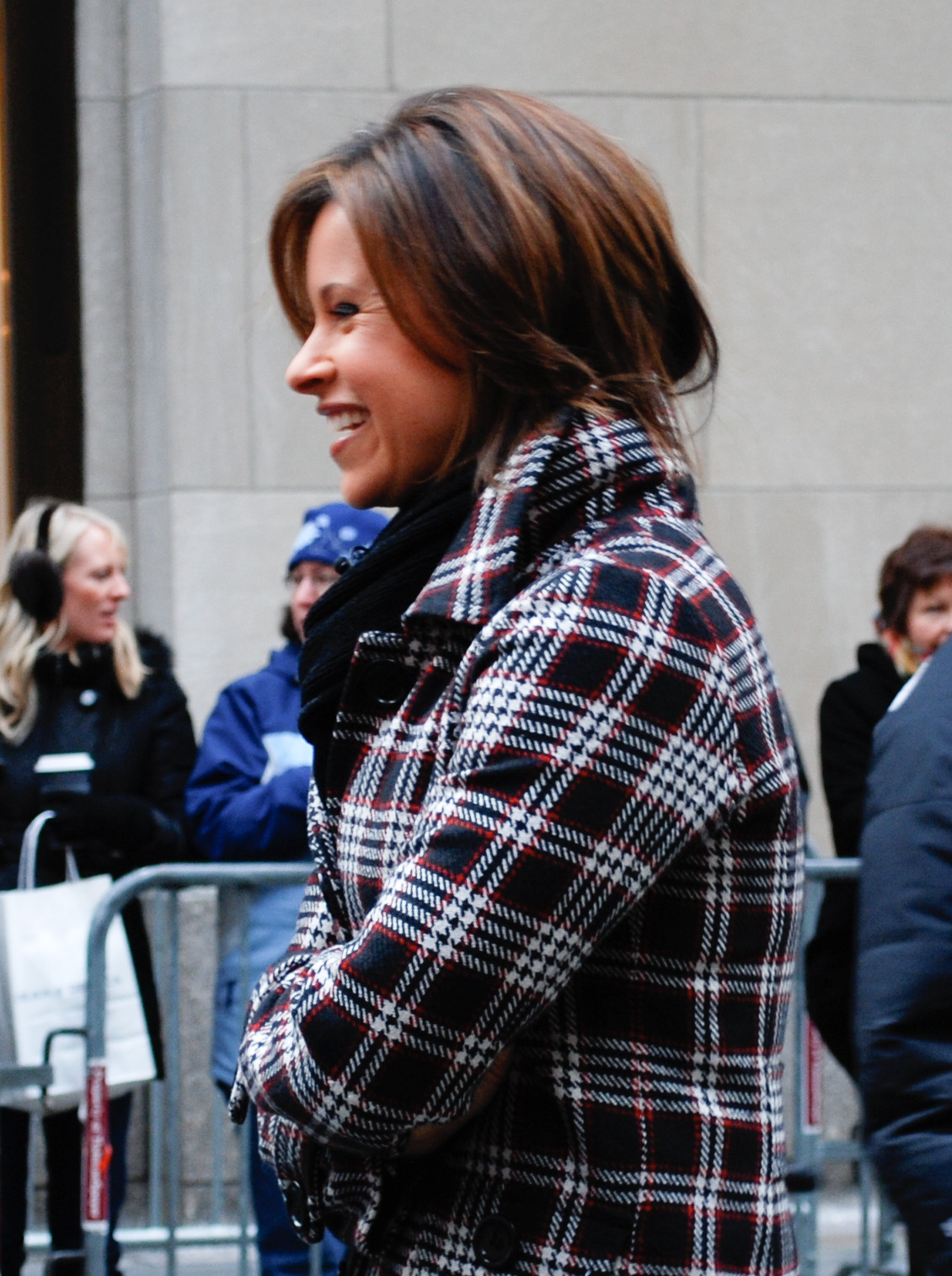
- Wolfe in 2009
- Born: Jennifer Wolfeld; February 26, 1974 (age 52); Kingston, Jamaica
- Education: Binghamton University SUNY-Geneseo
- Occupations: NBC News anchor and correspondent, fitness expert, personal trainer, television host
- Notable credit(s): Weekend Today news anchor (2012–2014); Today correspondent (2007–2014); Lifestyle and fitness correspondent (2014–2015); First Things First (2017–2022)
- Partner: Stephanie Gosk (2013-2021)
- Children: 2

Jenna Wolfe (born Jennifer Wolfeld; February 26, 1974) is a Jamaican-born Haitian and American journalist and personal trainer. From 2007 to 2014, she was a correspondent for NBC's Today and Sunday co-anchor from 2007 to 2012 and news anchor for Weekend Today from 2012 to 2014. On September 12, 2014, Wolfe left the weekend Today show for a new role as lifestyle and fitness correspondent on the weekday Today show and NBC News.

From September 2017 through August 2022, Wolfe worked with Fox Sports on FS1 as a host of the show First Things First with Kevin Wildes and Nick Wright. She was also a field correspondent for Yellowstone Live on National Geographic.

== Early life and education ==
Wolfe was born in Kingston, Jamaica, and grew up in Pétion-Ville, Haiti. Her father, Bennet Wolfeld, was Jewish and was born and raised in Puerto Rico. He owned a chain of leather factories in Puerto Rico and moved to Jamaica with his wife when he expanded his operations. Her mother, Sheila Greenfeld, was also Jewish and from New Jersey. Wolfe had a religious upbringing and had her bat mitzvah while living in the islands. Musician Bob Marley was a neighbor of her family in Kingston.

Wolfe's family moved from Jamaica to Haiti when she was five years old. In 1989, her family moved to the United States.

Wolfe attended SUNY Geneseo from 1992 to 1994. She graduated from Binghamton University in 1996 with Bachelor of Arts degrees in French and English.

== Broadcasting career ==
From 2004 to 2007, she was the weekend morning sports anchor for WABC's Eyewitness News in New York City where she had a special segment called "Jenna's Beef," in which she editorialized an event from the world of sports that week. Prior to that, she worked for the Madison Square Garden Network, WPHL-TV in Philadelphia as the first female sportscaster, WICZ-TV in Binghamton, New York, WUHF-TV in Rochester, New York, and the Today Show as an intern. Aside from her journalistic duties, Wolfe has appeared as a judge on Food Network's Iron Chef America.

== Career timeline ==
- 1996–1998: WICZ-TV
- 1998–1999: WUHF-TV
- 1999–2002: WPHL-TV
- 2002-2004: Madison Square Garden Network
- 2004–2007: WABC-TV weekend morning sports anchor
- 2007–2016: NBC News
  - 2007–2014: Today correspondent
  - 2007–2016: NBC News National correspondent
  - 2007–2012: Weekend Today Sunday co-anchor
  - 2012: Weekend Today co-anchor
  - 2012–September 21, 2014: Weekend Today news anchor
  - 2007–2015: Today fill-in anchor
  - 2014–2015: Today lifestyle and fitness correspondent
- 2017–2022: Fox Sports 1 – First Things First host

== Personal life ==
Wolfe speaks English, French and Haitian Creole. On March 27, 2013, Wolfe publicly came out as a lesbian and announced that she was expecting her first child with her partner, NBC News correspondent Stephanie Gosk. Wolfe and Gosk married each other in 2013. They welcomed a girl in August 2013. Their second daughter was born on February 4, 2015. Wolfe and Gosk separated in 2021; Wolfe later commented that the strain on both of them while working from home during the COVID-19 pandemic had contributed to family stress.

== See also ==
- Broadcast network
- LGBTQ culture in New York City
- List of LGBTQ people from New York City
- New Yorkers in journalism
- NYC Pride March
- Sports commentary
