= What's Wright? with Nick Wright =

American sports podcast

- Genre: Sports
- Format: Audio · Video
- Language: English

Cast and voices
- Hosted by: Nick Wright; Damonza Byrd

Production
- Production: The Volume; Blue Duck Media
- Length: 21–85 minutes

Technical specifications
- Video format: YouTube · Apple Podcasts
- Audio format: Podcast (via streaming or downloadable MP3)

Publication
- Original release: March 15, 2022
- Updates: 3× weekly

Related
- Website: www.foxsports.com/shows/whats-wright-with-nick-wright

What's Wright? with Nick Wright (sometimes capitalized What's Wright? With Nick Wright) is an American sports podcast and YouTube series. Hosted by sportscaster Nick Wright and co-hosted by his son Damonza Byrd, the series premiered on March 15, 2022.

== Development and history ==
After spending time as production assistant and weekend host for the Kansas City-based 610 Sports station, Nick Wright began hosting his own radio show on the station dubbed What's Wright with Nick Wright? After departing the station, Wright relocated to Houston, while continuing to work in sports radio, before working on television for Fox Sports 1 (FS1).

From 2018 to 2020, Wright hosted another incarnation of his What's Wright with Nick Wright? radio show, this time on SiriusXM's Mad Dog Radio station.

In January 2022, Fox Sports launched Fox Audio Network, a podcast network to leverage its on-air talent in the audio space. Originally scheduled to premiere on March 1, 2022, Wright's podcast ultimately premiered on March 15. In February 2025, Wright signed his podcast away from Fox Sports over to The Volume, a podcast network founded by Colin Cowherd. What's Wright? is produced by Blue Duck Media.

After Wright's podcast debuted, it held the #4 ranking on the Apple Podcasts chart. As of August 2025, the YouTube channel for the podcast has received over 210,000 subscribers and 44.7 million views.

== Format ==
Wright co-hosts the podcast with his son, Damonza Byrd. Wright's podcast episodes originally aired on Tuesdays. Episodes discussing general sports stories now air on Monday and Thursday, with sports betting-related episodes airing on Fridays.

On regular episodes of the podcasts, Wright and Byrd discuss general trending sports topics. The NBA and NFL are often highlighted during the series, although Wright and Byrd have discussed tennis, golf, and college sports topics.

Wright has also hosted special episodes of the podcast, including his countdown "Top 50 NBA of the Last 50 Years", as well as an interview with Lil Wayne.

== See also ==
- List of sports podcasts
