= Chris Broussard =

American sports analyst and commentator (born 1968)

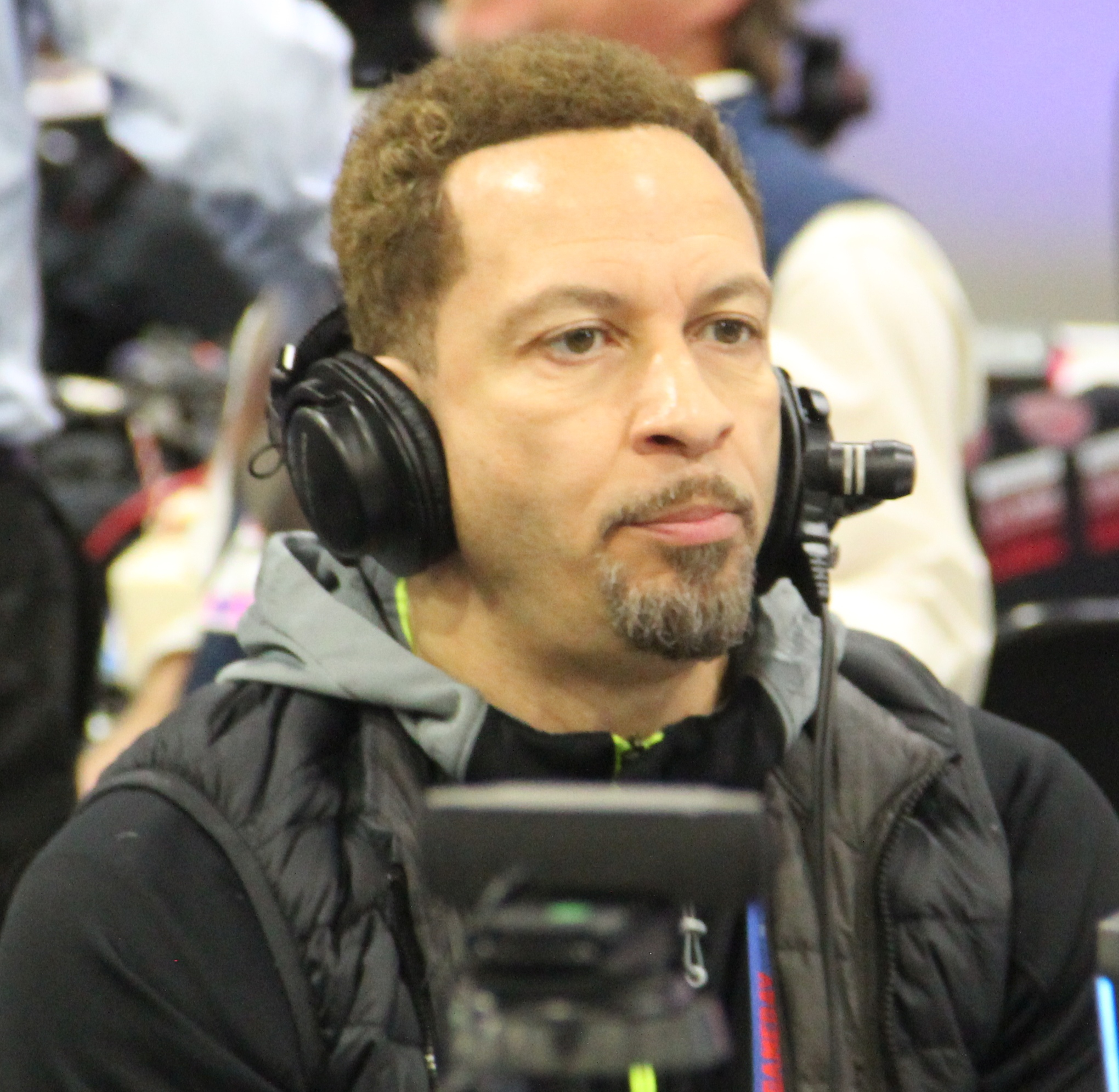
- Broussard in 2019
- Born: October 28, 1968 (age 58); Baton Rouge, Louisiana, U.S.
- Education: Oberlin College
- Occupations: Sports columnist, TV sports color analyst, TV personality
- Years active: 1990–present
- Spouse: Crystal Naii Collins (m. 1995)
- Children: 2
- Basketball career

Career information
- High school: Holy Name High School (Parma Heights, Ohio)
- College: Oberlin College
- Position: Point guard

Christopher Dana Broussard (born October 28, 1968) is an American sports analyst and commentator for Fox Sports 1 (FS1) and Fox Sports Radio. Best known for his coverage of the NBA, he is now a co-host on FS1's afternoon show First Things First, as well as co-host of The Odd Couple with Rob Parker on Fox Sports Radio. Previously, he worked for The New York Times, ESPN The Magazine and ESPN.com, and made appearances on ESPN's SportsCenter, NBA Countdown, First Take, and NBA Fastbreak as an analyst.

== Early life and education ==
Broussard was born in Baton Rouge, Louisiana, and is an African American of Louisiana Creole descent. Due to his father's job as a personnel manager for Traveler's Insurance Co., Broussard and his family moved often during his childhood. He lived in Cincinnati, Ohio; Indianapolis, Indiana; Syracuse, New York; Des Moines, Iowa; and Cleveland, Ohio, before finishing high school. In 1986, he graduated from Holy Name High School, a private Catholic school in the Cleveland suburb, Parma Heights, Ohio. A standout football and basketball player at Holy Name, Broussard was inducted into the school's Hall of Fame in 2016. He went to Oberlin College, from which he graduated in May 1990 with a bachelor's degree in English. He played point guard on the Oberlin basketball team.

== Career ==
=== Sportswriting career ===
In 1990, Broussard began his sports writing career for The Plain Dealer. He worked there for four years before moving to the Akron Beacon Journal where he started covering the NBA, spending two-and-a-half seasons with them as the Cleveland Cavaliers beat writer. Broussard then went on to work for The New York Times in 1998, where he covered the New Jersey Nets for two years, the New York Knicks for three years, and the NBA in general for one year. In September 2004 Broussard joined ESPN The Magazine.

=== TV career ===
In 2004, in addition to his writing duties, Broussard began making regular appearances on ESPN as an NBA insider and analyst, and occasionally as a panelist on First Take debating sports topics with Skip Bayless. For the 2011–12 NBA season, Broussard was added to ABC's NBA Countdown pregame show as an NBA insider. He also spent three years as a sideline reporter for nationally televised games on ESPN and ABC.

In April 2013, Broussard was criticized for comments he made on an ESPN Outside the Lines program about NBA player Jason Collins coming out as homosexual. Broussard had expressed his views on homosexuality and other sexual behaviors that he characterized as sins, stating "If you're openly living in unrepentant sin...I believe that's walking in open rebellion to God." He later released a statement clarifying his remarks, saying that he had merely offered his "personal opinion as it relates to Christianity," and conceded that he realizes "that some people disagree with my opinion and I accept and respect that."

In October 2016, Broussard left ESPN for Fox Sports 1. He has stated that he left ESPN because the network's offer to return would have relegated him strictly to a reporter's role. At that stage of his career, he found FS1's offer to be more of a commentator, analyst, and personality more appealing. At FS1, Broussard is a regular panelist on Skip and Shannon: Undisputed, The Herd with Colin Cowherd, First Things First, and Lock It In. On August 30, 2021, Broussard became co-host of First Things First, replacing former NFL wide receiver Brandon Marshall.

In September 2018, Broussard began hosting The Odd Couple on Fox Sports Radio alongside Rob Parker. Broussard left the show in September 2024.

During an appearance on First Things First in October 2023, Broussard used the slur "retarded" while defending James Harden in reference to Nick Wright's statement regarding Harden's response to a trade sending him from the Philadelphia 76ers to the Los Angeles Clippers. He corrected himself saying "developmentally disabled" and apologized saying he had a cousin with developmental disabilities, who recently died.

== Acting appearance ==
In 2017, Broussard appeared in the Netflix movie #Realityhigh, a teen comedy about a popular girl's life going viral. In an appearance on his sports talk show First Things First in 2026, Broussard jokingly claimed his character's name in the movie was Jackson Blade.

== Personal life ==
He has been married to his wife, Crystal, since 1995. The couple has twin daughters named Alexis and Noelle, born in March 1998.

He has spoken publicly about his Christian faith, which he has had since 1989. He was raised Catholic.

In addition to his work as a sports commentator, Broussard is the Founder and President of The K.I.N.G. Movement, a national Christian men's organization that seeks to strengthen men in their Christian faith and lifestyle by providing support, accountability, teaching, fellowship and brotherhood. K.I.N.G. is an acronym that stands for Knowledge, Inspiration, and Nurture through God. It has chapters in various cities.

In 2023, Broussard collaborated with the Institute of World Politics Chair of Law and Human Rights Matthew Daniels to release a six part Bible study based on the life, teachings, and biblical principles of Martin Luther King Jr. endorsed by Andrew Young and distributed by Urban Ministries and a subsidiary of HarperCollins.
