= Jenny Taft =

American sports television personality (born 1987)

- Taft in 2026
- Born: September 5, 1987 (age 39); Edina, Minnesota, U.S.
- Education: Boston University
- Occupations: Sports television personality Sideline reporter
- Years active: 2011–present
- Notable credit(s): Skip and Shannon: Undisputed; Fox College Football; Soccer on Fox Sports
- Spouse: Matt Gilroy (m. 2015)
- Children: 1

Jenny Taft (born September 5, 1987) is an American sports television personality who works as a lead college football sideline reporter on Fox broadcasts. Her broadcasting career began with the Fox Sports North (FSN) regional affiliate. Taft is also a pit reporter for BattleBots on the Discovery Channel and served as the moderator on Fox Sports 1's Undisputed.

== Early years ==
Taft was born on September 5, 1987, in Edina, Minnesota. She attended Edina High School, graduating from the school in 2006. Taft then attended Boston University, where she played lacrosse. She majored in Broadcast Journalism and graduated with a bachelor's degree in 2010.

== Broadcasting career ==
=== Fox Sports North ===
Taft's broadcasting career began with Fox Sports in 2011. This early period of her career saw her fill a "Fox Sports Girl" role, as she served as a Fox Sports North sideline reporter for the Minnesota Lynx of the WNBA. During her time as an FSN Girl, she was also a social media contributor for Minnesota's Timberwolves, Twins, and Wild sports teams, as well as an in-stadium/arena host at Twins and Wild games. Taft attributed her success later in her career in part due to getting on-camera repetitions at FSN.

=== Fox Sports ===
In August 2013, she was promoted to join FS1's news and highlights update team. She served as a track reporter for a 2013 Supercross event, which was her debut assignment at FS1. She also served as a reporter for the U.S. women's national soccer team (USWNT) at the 2015 FIFA Women's World Cup.

Taft got her start in college football reporting in 2014, as part of FS1's game coverage. In 2017, Taft was elevated to lead college football sideline reporter, alongside play-by-play commentator Gus Johnson and analyst Joel Klatt. Her role at FS1 expanded considerably, as she has additionally covered the NFL, MLB, and the Westminster Kennel Club Dog Show.

In 2018, she served as a fill-in host and moderator on various FS1 programs. That summer, it was announced that Taft would be succeeding Joy Taylor as the moderator of Skip and Shannon: Undisputed, hosted by Skip Bayless and Shannon Sharpe. Shortly after, on September 5, FS1 debuted CFB: Inside Slant, a weekly college football show hosted by Taft. In addition to taking on these new positions at FS1, she retained her college football sideline reporting duties for the 2018 season. In 2020, she was a sideline reporter for Fox Sports' coverage of XFL games. In 2022, Taft signed an extension at Fox Sports but left Skip and Shannon: Undisputed after going on maternity leave in February. Taft also got into a verbal dispute on air with Skip Bayless after Bayless made critical comments about Dallas Cowboys' coach Mike McCarthy based on his body weight and appearance.

She again served as a reporter for the USWNST for the 2019 and 2023 FIFA Women's World Cups. She also served as a reporter during the 2022 FIFA World Cup in Qatar.

== Personal life ==
Taft is the daughter of John Taft, a former professional ice hockey defenseman and member of the United States men's national ice hockey team at the 1976 Winter Olympics. In 2015, Taft married Matt Gilroy, also a former NHL defenseman and a fellow BU alum. On December 4, 2021, Taft revealed that she was pregnant with a due date the following March. Subsequently, she welcomed a baby girl named Georgie “Gigi” James Gilroy.
