= Kevin Wildes =

Kevin Wildes may refer to:

- Kevin Wildes (priest), American priest and university president
- Kevin Wildes (sportscaster), American sports television producer and host
