= Athlete 360 =

- Title screen
- Genre: Sports Medicine; Documentary
- Created by: Tricia Bradley
- Directed by: Ken Yagoda
- Starring: Dr. Mark Adickes; Dikembe Mutombo; Chad Fleischer; Kevin Everett; Toby Dawson; Mark Schlereth; Steve Sparks; Mike Moore; Tommy Kendall; Stacy Lewis
- Country of origin: United States
- Original language: English
- No. of seasons: 1
- No. of episodes: 9

Production
- Executive producer: Tricia Bradley
- Production location: Houston, Texas
- Running time: 23 minutes
- Production companies: Serious Fun Productions, LLC

Original release
- Network: Fox Sports

Athlete 360 is a television program that runs on Fox Sports Net channels across the United States. The only television show focused exclusively on sports medicine, Athlete 360 takes the form of long interviews with a different athlete each episode. The athletes, some working and some retired, have all had extensive, career-changing injuries. By talking to the athletes about their personal histories, their injuries, and more, the show attempts to take a holistic look at sports, sports medicine, and some of the men and women who have become American national heroes.

Season One of Athlete 360 is currently airing for the second time. The show initially aired beginning in September, 2009 on Fox Sports Houston before being picked up by other Fox Sports networks and affiliates across the country. The first season's second run began on April 12, 2010.

== Host Jock to Doc Mark Adickes ==
=== Jock ===
Dr. Mark Adickes, the show's host, is a former professional football player turned orthopedic surgeon. As a member of the Washington Redskins NFL team, Adickes helped his team win Super Bowl XXVI in 1992. Dr. Adickes also played for the Kansas City Chiefs and, as an undergraduate, he was named an All-American for the Baylor University Bears.

=== Doc ===
Following his football career, Adickes decided to go to medical school. To prepare to take the MCAT, Adickes studied science and math at George Mason University before going on to Harvard University Medical School. After speaking at his medical school commencement, Dr. Adickes went on to become Chief Resident at the Mayo Clinic in Minnesota and studied sports medicine further with Richard Steadman at the Colorado-based Steadman-Hawkins Clinic. Now, Dr. Adickes is the Co-Medical Director of the Memorial Hermann Hospital Sports Medicine Institute. Dr. Adickes is official doctor for the NBA team the Houston Rockets, the United States Ski Team, and for RodeoHouston.

== Season one ==
=== Featured Athletes ===
- Chad Fleischer: Downhill Skier
- Dikembe Mutombo: Former NBA Player
- Kevin Everett: Former NFL Player
- Toby Dawson: Freestyle Skier
- Mark Schlereth: Former NFL Player
- Steve Sparks: Former Major League Baseball Player
- Mike Moore: Professional Bull Rider
- Tommy Kendall: Former Race Car Driver
- Stacy Lewis: Pro Golfer on the LPGA Tour

== Production ==
Athlete 360 was created by Serious Fun Productions, a 13-year-old production company based out of Boston, MA that creates television series, segments, and commercials. The company is focused on building and branding talent and "developing media properties that become a showcase for that on-camera expert."

Serious Fun Productions, LLC is led by President & Executive Producer Tricia Bradley.
