= Mark Adickes =

American football player and orthopedic surgeon (born 1961)

No. 61
- Position: Guard

Personal information
- Born: April 22, 1961 (age 65); Stuttgart, West Germany

Career information
- High school: Killeen (Killeen, Texas, U.S.)
- College: Baylor
- Supplemental draft: 1984: 1st round, 5th overall pick

Career history
- Los Angeles Express (1984–1985); Kansas City Chiefs (1986–1989); Washington Redskins (1990–1992)

Awards and highlights
- Super Bowl champion (XXVI); Second-team All-American (1983); First-team All-SWC (1983)

Career NFL statistics
- Games played: 77
- Games started: 49
- Touchdowns: 1
- Stats at Pro Football Reference

Mark Stephen Adickes (born April 22, 1961) is an orthopedic surgeon and a former American football offensive lineman in the National Football League (NFL) for the Kansas City Chiefs and Washington Redskins. Adickes was an All-American offensive lineman at Baylor University and later attended George Mason University and Harvard University Medical School. He is ESPN's NFL injury analyst and is the chief of sports medicine for Baylor College of Medicine.

== Early life ==
Adickes played high school football at Killeen High School in Killeen, Texas. He attended and played college football at Baylor University, where he was named an All-American.

Adickes was inducted into the Baylor Sports Hall of Fame in 1998.

== Professional career ==
Adickes started his professional football career in the United States Football League (USFL) for the Los Angeles Express in 1984 where he blocked for Steve Young. He was then chosen in the 1984 NFL Supplemental Draft of USFL and CFL Players by the Kansas City Chiefs, where he would play for four years. He then played for two years for the Washington Redskins, winning the Super Bowl.

== Medical career ==
After retiring from the NFL, Adickes attended George Mason University and then Harvard University Medical School, after which he completed his residency in orthopedic surgery at the Mayo Clinic in Rochester, Minnesota. Adickes completed his sports medicine fellowship under the tutelage of Richard Steadman at the Steadman-Hawkins Clinic in Vail, Colorado.

Adickes is formerly the Co-medical Director and Orthopedic Surgeon at the Memorial Hermann Hospital Sports Medicine Institute in Houston, Texas. He is chief of the division of sports medicine and associate professor of orthopedic surgery at Baylor College of Medicine.

Adickes is team physician for the Houston Rockets, United States Ski Team, Houston Livestock Show and Rodeo and University of St. Thomas.

== Television career ==
Adickes worked with Tricia Bradley of Serious Fun Productions, LLC, to blend his two distinct careers: a professional football player and an orthopedic surgeon, aka, Jock to Doc. In 2013, Adickes was signed to ESPN as an injury expert and appears on a regular basis when a top athlete gets injured. At the start of the 2014 NFL season, DirecTV launched a new channel called "The Fantasy Zone," and Adickes became an integral member of the show. Adickes has appeared on the NBC Today Show, where he discussed concussions and football. He has also made appearances on Fox NFL Sunday and was a regular guest on CBS's The Doctors. Adickes is the host of a sports medicine documentary program, Athlete 360, on which he interviews professional athletes who have sustained major injuries necessitating orthopedic surgery. Some of the featured athletes include Kevin Everett, Dikembe Mutombo, Mark Schlereth, and golfer Stacy Lewis, whose modified scoliosis surgery made her career in golf possible. In 2013 Adickes was hired by ESPN as its NFL injury analyst.
