= First Things First (talk show) =

Sports talk show broadcast by FS1

- Genre: Talk show
- Starring: Nick Wright (2017–present); Kevin Wildes (2020–present); Chris Broussard (2021–present); Danny Parkins (2025–present); Cris Carter (2017–2019); Jenna Wolfe (2017–2022); Brandon Marshall (2020–2021)
- Country of origin: United States
- Original language: English

Production
- Production locations: NEP Studios, Manhattan, New York City
- Running time: 3 hours

Original release
- Network: Fox Sports 1
- Release: September 5, 2017 – present

First Things First (FTF) is an American sports and entertainment talk show starring Nick Wright, Chris Broussard, and Kevin Wildes. Originally titled First Things First with Cris Carter and Nick Wright, the series premiered on Fox Sports 1 (FS1) on September 5, 2017. The show is also released as a podcast and radio simulcast.

== Background and development ==
Fox Sports 1 (FS1) launched in 2013. The fledgling channel began airing The Herd with Colin Cowherd and Skip and Shannon: Undisputed in 2015 and 2016, respectively. However, its early morning (6 a.m. to 9:30 a.m.) time slot, described as a "black hole" by Sporting News, was used to air game replays and reruns of other shows. Meanwhile, Nick Wright, then a local sports radio host based in Houston, began working at Fox Sports. Wright would frequently guest host on The Herd, filling in for Colin Cowherd.

Lacking a morning show, FS1 began planning to launch one. When Cowherd went on vacation in December 2016, then Fox Sports executive Jamie Horowitz had Wright and former National Football League (NFL) wide receiver Cris Carter co-host The Herd, using this as a test of on-air chemistry between the two. At the time, Carter was a new FS1 hire, having previously worked at ESPN. Both he and Wright asked to work together.

FS1 indeed hired Carter and Wright to co-host the channel's morning talk show, which was titled First Things First with Cris Carter and Nick Wright. Shortly after, former Today correspondent Jenna Wolfe was brought on to join Carter and Wright on the show.

== Broadcast history ==
The show premiered on September 5, 2017, and featured Carter and Wright debating sports topics, with Wolfe serving as co-host and moderator. Serving as a lead-in for Skip and Shannon: Undisputed, the show was originally placed into FS1's 6 a.m. to 9 a.m. (ET) time slot. Carter last appeared on the show on October 30, 2019. While some sports media outlets reported that Carter and network executives disagreed over him being left off Fox Sport's Thursday Night Football pregame broadcast, neither Carter nor Fox Sports gave a reasoning for his departure. A spokesperson for the network only commented that Carter "is no longer with Fox Sports," without further elaboration. Former NFL defensive lineman Chris Canty briefly filled-in for Carter.

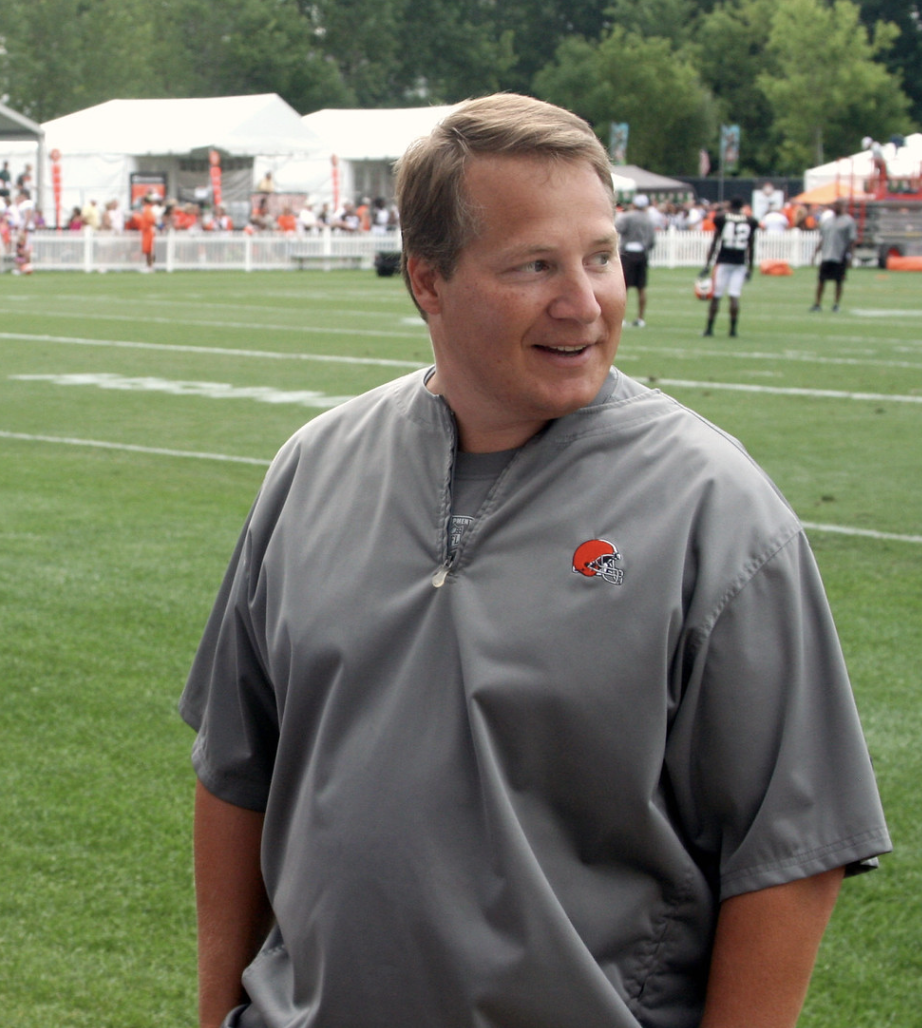
Eric Mangini

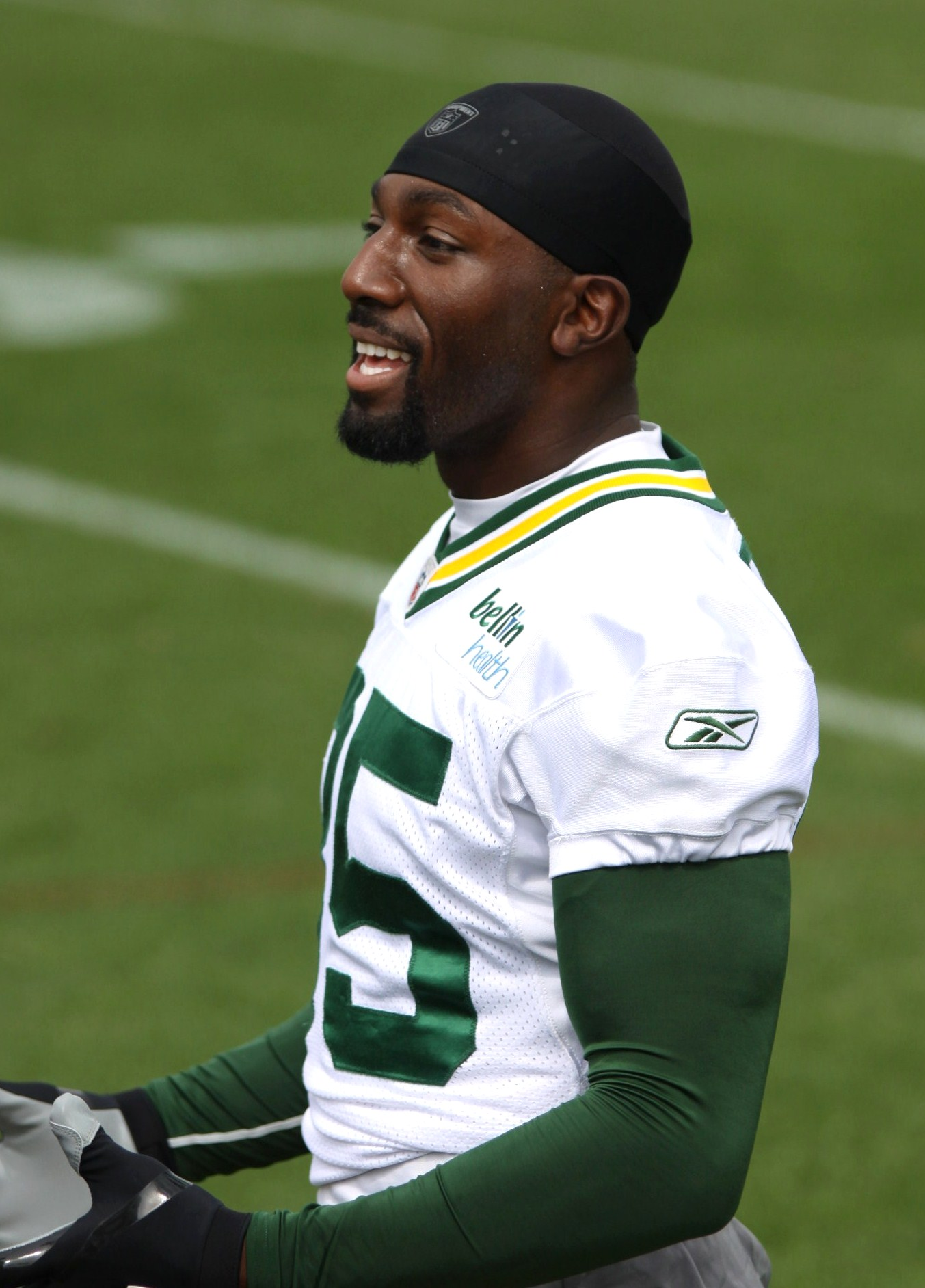
Greg Jennings

Mangini (left) and Jennings (right) are recurring guests on the show, primarily for NFL-related segments

Following Carter's departure from the show, Fox Sports looked to pivot First Things First into a "second iteration" that would feature "a loose, free-flowing, conversational format and add a still-to-be-determined fourth talent to the set," in addition to Carter's permanent replacement. In February 2020, television producer and development executive Kevin Wildes was announced to join Wright and Wolfe on the show. In August 2020, former NFL wide receiver Brandon Marshall was announced as the fourth on-air personality as First Things First fully shifted to a panel format. Marshall's tenure on the show lasted until August 2021. Later that month, sports media journalist and reporter Chris Broussard was named as an official host. He previously made frequent appearances as an NBA analyst on the show. Former NFL wide receiver Greg Jennings and head coach Eric Mangini have also appeared on the show as guest panelists.

Wolfe made her final appearance on the show in August 2022. After Wolfe's departure, the show went on a brief hiatus before it premiered in a new afternoon time slot on September 6, 2022. In its new slot, the show ran for 90 minutes. In October 2023, Broussard used the r-slur while discussing James Harden's trade from the Philadelphia 76ers to the Los Angeles Clippers. Broussard quickly apologized for using the term while still on-air, though he received criticism online from viewers. 2023 marked the show's most-viewed year up to that point.

In 2024, the show was expanded to a two-hour slot from 3 p.m. to 5 p.m (ET). That year, Joel McHale and Heidi Gardner made guest appearances on the show's "Mahomes Mountain" segment. American rapper Lil Wayne made a guest appearance on the series in February 2025. In July, the show's expansion to three hours was announced, with its airing extending to 6 p.m. (ET) and Danny Parkins joining as a daily presence for the show's third hour. Mangini and Jennings were also announced to remain on the show as regular contributors during football season. The show's expanded third hour, dubbed First Things First: OT, debuted in August. Willie Colon also appears on OT as a contributor.

== Reception and viewership ==
The on-air chemistry between Broussard, Wildes, and Wright has been well received. Brandon Contes of Awful Announcing stated that the trio "all deserve credit for learning how to bring the best out of each other on TV". Writing for Front Office Sports, Michael McCarthy called the trio's on-air chemistry the best on FS1. In 2026, the show was nominated for a Sports Emmy Award in the "Outstanding Sports Studio Show: Daily" category.

In May 2019, the Associated Press reported that viewership for First Things First "increased 30 percent in a year while averaging 61,000 viewers." In November 2023, the show reported that October was its 14th consecutive month double-digit year-over-year growth in viewership. Following the show's time slot change in 2024, it experienced a 53 percent viewership increase through September. The show's YouTube channel has accumulated over 1.09 million subscribers and 1.04 billion views, as of April 25, 2026.

== See also ==
- Breakfast Ball
