= Mark Schlereth =

American football player and sportscaster (born 1966)

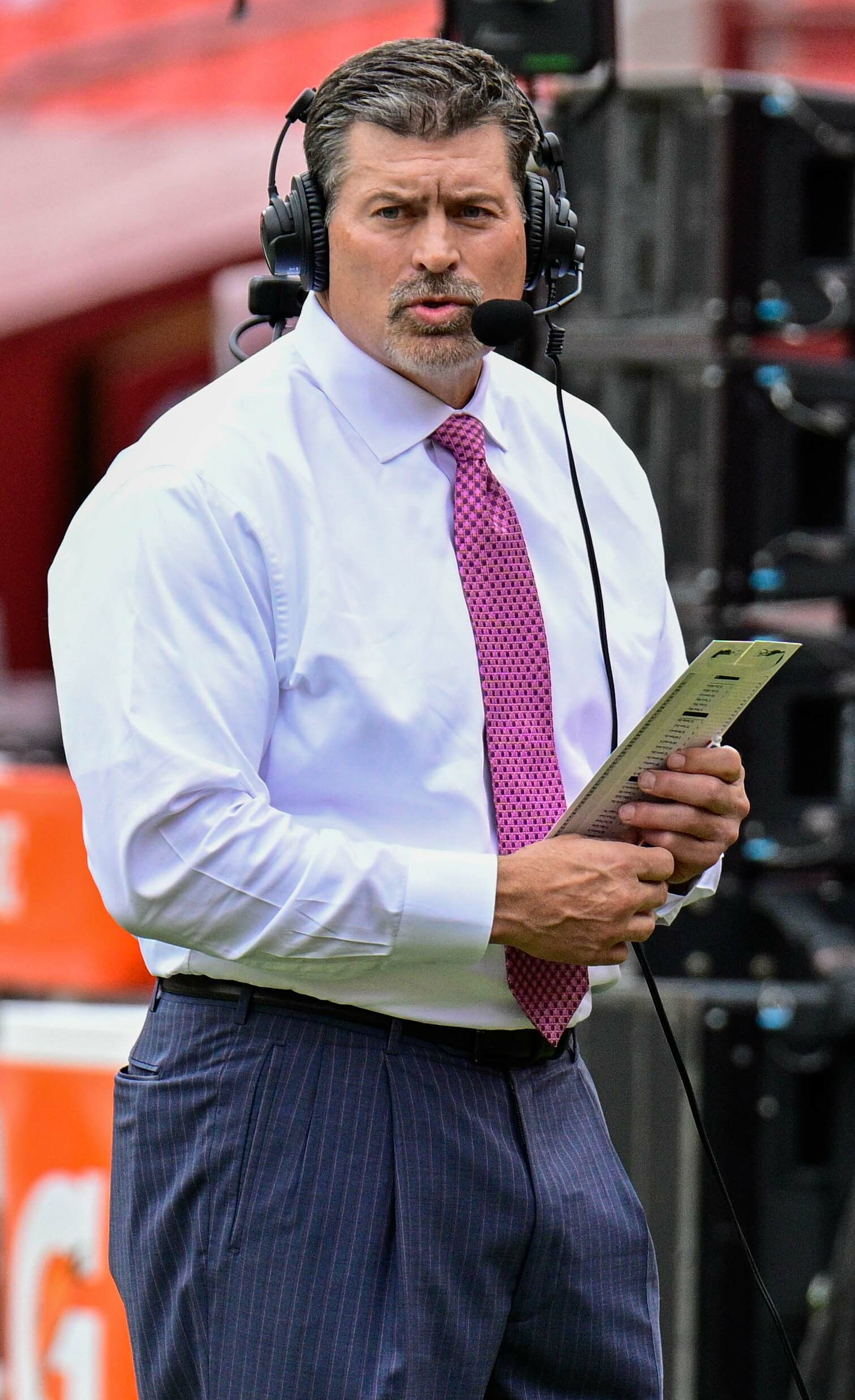
- Schlereth in 2022

No. 69
- Position: Guard

Personal information
- Born: January 25, 1966 (age 60); Anchorage, Alaska, U.S.
- Listed height: 6 ft 3 in (1.91 m)
- Listed weight: 287 lb (130 kg)

Career information
- High school: Robert Service (Anchorage)
- College: Idaho (1984–1988)
- NFL draft: 1989: 10th round, 263rd overall pick

Career history
- Washington Redskins (1989–1994); Denver Broncos (1995–2000)

Awards and highlights
- 3× Super Bowl champion (XXVI, XXXII, XXXIII); 2× Pro Bowl (1991, 1998); George Halas Award (1998); Denver Broncos 50th Anniversary Team

Career NFL statistics
- Games played: 156
- Games started: 140
- Fumble recoveries: 3
- Stats at Pro Football Reference

Mark Fremont Schlereth (/ˈʃlɛrɪθ/; born January 25, 1966) is an American former professional football player who is a television and radio sportscaster. Schlereth played guard in the National Football League (NFL) for 12 seasons (1989–2000) with the Washington Redskins and Denver Broncos. He is currently a football analyst for Fox Sports, appearing on FS1, and other programs. He also co-hosted Sedano & Stink with Jorge Sedano from 7–10 p.m. ET on ESPN Radio until late March 2015 when he left the program to pursue other broadcast opportunities. He also appeared on the soap opera Guiding Light, and 2012's Red Dawn remake.

== Early life and college ==
Schlereth was born and grew up in Anchorage, Alaska, and struggled with dyslexia as a youth; he did not learn to read until he was seven. He graduated from Robert Service High School in 1984. Growing up in Alaska, Schlereth did not receive much attention as a college football prospect; the only schools that offered him a scholarship were Idaho and Hawaii. He accepted the scholarship offer from the University of Idaho from head coach Dennis Erickson. Erickson departed following the 1985 season, and Schlereth started at left guard on the Vandals' offensive line for new head coach Keith Gilbertson, blocking for quarterbacks Scott Linehan and John Friesz. In his senior season in 1988, the Vandals advanced to the national semifinals, and he was second-team all-Big Sky.

Schlereth was a charter member of the University of Idaho Athletics Hall of Fame, inducted in 2008.

== Professional career ==
Schlereth was selected in the tenth round (#263 overall) of the 1989 NFL draft by the Washington Redskins. He played 12 NFL seasons—six with the Denver Broncos (1995–2000). He was a member of three Super Bowl championship teams (one with the Redskins and two with the Broncos) and was selected to the Pro Bowl for his performances in the 1991 and 1998 seasons. On January 25, 1998, Schlereth celebrated his 32nd birthday on the same day he helped the Broncos win Super Bowl XXXII, a 31–24 victory over the Green Bay Packers.

Before ending his playing career, Schlereth endured 29 surgeries. Twenty of those surgeries were performed on his knees (15 left, five right). After the 13th procedure on his left knee on July 24, 2000, Denver Broncos head coach Mike Shanahan stated, "He has a great pain threshold. I think the doctors said that it was the worst knee that they've ever seen." Schlereth would have two more procedures on his left knee during the 2000 season, his last in the NFL. His injuries are documented on Athlete 360, the sports medicine television show hosted by Schlereth's former Redskins teammate, Dr. Mark Adickes.

On April 18, 2001, Schlereth announced his retirement. "The reason I came out here today was to announce that I have just signed a six-year, $42 million contract to extend my career with the Denver Broncos. The truth of the matter is, after going through my 15th operation on my left knee last November, it became painfully obvious that I couldn't sign a six-year contract for $42 worth of Tupperware. I started to realize in the last three months of free agency that there is not a lot of market for a 6 ft. 3 in, 245-pound guard that is 35 years old and beat to a pulp." He landed a job with ESPN soon after.

== Television/radio career ==
After retirement, Schlereth hosted an afternoon sports talk radio show on Denver AM radio 760 The Zone with fellow former Broncos lineman David "Doc" Diaz-Infante. The show was frequently referred to as the "Stink and Doc" show. Schlereth was a part-time analyst with ESPN for a time, commuting from Denver to Connecticut, before leaving 760 to go full-time with ESPN in 2004. He was an analyst on NFL Live (2004–2017) and SportsCenter.

Schlereth revealed on the Mike and Mike in the Morning show that he was considering a career in acting, mainly on soap operas, under the name Roc Hoover. Schlereth originally chose the name Rock Hoover, however after cybersquatters took several domain names pertaining to that name he dropped the k from Rock and became Roc Hoover. He announced on May 4, 2007, that he was cast as Detective Roc Hoover, a recurring role, on the soap opera, Guiding Light.

Schlereth was a featured athlete on Athlete 360, a sports medicine television show.

After the 2010 NFC Championship Game, Schlereth was critical of Chicago Bears quarterback Jay Cutler, tweeting "As a guy who had 20 knee surgeries you'd have to drag me out on a stretcher to leave a championship game!" In 2012 Schlereth appeared on the Discovery Channel show American Guns. He worked with the staff at Gunsmoke gun shop to find a suitable firearm he could use on a hunting trip with his son. Since 2015, Schlereth has appeared as himself in a number of episodes of HBO's Ballers.

Since 2017, Schlereth has been a color commentator for NFL games broadcast on Fox NFL, initially being paired with Dick Stockton on the #6 team for 4 seasons, until being paired with former ESPN colleagues Adam Amin and Lindsay Czarniak on the #3 team. He also co-hosts a radio show in Denver on 104.3 The Fan, and appears as an analyst on FS1 television programming. He was a frequent guest and fill-in host for Mike Golic on Mike and Mike in the Morning. He has also filled in for Jim Rome on Jim Rome is Burning.

In 2024, Schlereth became a co-host alongside Craig Carton and Danny Parkins on Fox Sports 1 (FS1)'s Breakfast Ball.

== Personal life ==
Schlereth is married to Lisa Schlereth. They have three children: Alexandria, Avery, and Daniel. Alexandria was an actress featured on the MyNetworkTV series Desire in 2006. Avery was a contestant on Kansas City Chiefs tight end Travis Kelce's reality dating show Catching Kelce, but was not chosen. She is still pursuing a modeling career in California. Daniel was a pitcher in Major League Baseball, having appeared in 94 games in a relief capacity. Originally from Anchorage, Alaska, Mark told the story his rookie year of buried fish heads, known as "Stinkheads," that native Alaskans would dig up and eat if food was scarce. That name stuck and eventually "Stink" became his nickname and became the name of "Stinkin' Good" years later.
