= Stephanie Gosk =

American journalist and correspondent (born 1972)

- Born: April 17, 1972 (age 54); Londonderry, New Hampshire
- Education: Georgetown University B.A. in economics
- Occupation: NBC News Correspondent
- Partner: Jenna Wolfe (2012-2021)
- Children: 2

Stephanie Gosk (born April 17, 1972) is an American television journalist.

== Early life and education ==
Gosk graduated high school in 1990 from Phillips Academy. She then began her college career at Middlebury College in Vermont, but transferred to Georgetown University in Washington D.C. after deciding she wanted to experience college in a large city. During her time there, Gosk spent a semester abroad in Florence, Italy. After graduating from Georgetown in 1994 with a bachelor's degree in economics, she spent time in the Dominican Republic as a Peace Corps volunteer.

== Career ==
Gosk is a correspondent for NBC News. She joined the network in September 2006, and has gone on to cover numerous major events in recent history.

== Personal life ==
Gosk is openly lesbian. She and news anchor Jenna Wolfe married in 2013, and had two daughters. Wolfe and Gosk separated in 2021.

== See also ==
- List of LGBT people from New York City
- New Yorkers in journalism
