= Matt Spiegel =

American talk radio host

- Born: Matthew H. Spiegel; September 15, 1970 (age 55); New Jersey, U.S.
- Education: Emerson College
- Occupations: Radio personality, musician, sports commentator
- Years active: 1998–present
- Works: The Score SportsRadio 670, Sporting News Radio
- Spouse: Christine Spiegel
- Children: 1
- Awards: 2022 Marconi Award Nomini

Matt Spiegel a.k.a. 'Spiegs' (born September 15, 1970) is a sports talk show host and singer based in Chicago. He served as a host on The Score SportsRadio 670 off and on since 2009. As of 2024, he hosts Spiegel and Holmes with Laurence Holmes and hosts the Sunday morning seasonal baseball show "Hit & Run". He has also serves as a fill-in broadcaster on the Chicago Cubs Radio Network.

== Personal ==
Spiegel grew up in New Jersey as the youngest of five children. He studied broadcasting at Emerson College in Boston, Massachusetts where he won several sportscasting awards. He enjoyed internships at MLB Productions working on This Week in Baseball, and at WBZ-TV in Boston, working Bob Lobel and Bob Neumeier. Throughout the 90s, Spiegel was a producer, reporter, and talk show host at The Score SportsRadio 670 in Chicago, and was also a disc jockey for WXRT-FM.

He has a son, Rubin, who is named in honor of his deceased mother. Spiegel lives in the South Loop neighborhood of Chicago, with his wife Christine (Dominguez) Spiegel.

== Career ==
In 1999, Spiegel was the producer of Sound Opinions, a rock and roll talk show on WXRT, and moved with the show to WBEZ, Chicago Public Radio, where the show still is produced. It airs nationally through American Public Media.

As a singer and band leader, Spiegel released two albums with brother Jon and their band Brother Brother in the 90s. In 2002, Spiegel founded Tributosaurus, "the beast of multiple musical faces." Every month, the band welcomes guest artists from around the Chicago area for concerts.

Spiegel moved to Los Angeles in 2007, where he founded the LA edition of Tributosaurus and resumed his career with Sporting News Radio. However, he returned to Chicago in 2009 to team up with Dan McNeil on WSCR 670 to co-host the "Danny Mac Show" from 9 a.m. to 1 p.m. In 2011, the show changed its name to "The McNeil and Spiegel Show."

When Dan McNeil left WSCR in 2014, Spiegel became the driver of a new midday show with former Bears long snapper Patrick Mannelly called The Spiegel and Mannelly Show. After Mannelly's quick departure, Spiegel teamed up with former Score producer Jason Goff, who returned from Atlanta, to host The Spiegel and Goff Show. Their partnership lasted about two years before Goff was moved to the afternoon show in January 2017 with Dan Bernstein. Spiegel was paired with former Kansas City sports radio host and Glencoe native Danny Parkins on The Spiegel and Parkins Show. Spiegel hosted his final show with Parkins in March 2018 when Dan Bernstein moved from the afternoon drive slot to take his place while Parkins moved to afternoons with the newly returned Dan McNeil. Spiegel was thereafter named host of the Score's weekly Sunday baseball show, Hit and Run.

When McNeil was fired for disparaging comments made on Twitter, Spiegel eventually was named cohost with his former partner Danny Parkins to form the Parkins & Spiegel Show, which is a completely different show from the Spiegel and Parkins Show. The show which is produced by Chris Tannehill (and formerly Shane Riordan until April 2025) and airs Mon-Fri 2pm-6pm quickly became one of the most successful shows currently airing on The Score, being nominated for a Marconi Award in June 2022.

Spiegel writes a weekly baseball column for The Daily Herald.
