= Kevin Wildes (sportscaster) =

American sportscaster

- Born: Kevin Robert Wildes; February 10, 1978 (age 48)
- Education: La Salle University
- Occupations: Sports television producer and host
- Notable credit(s): SportsNation; NBA Countdown; The Jump; First Things First
- Spouse: Libby Geist (m. 2011)
- Children: 2

Kevin Robert Wildes (born February 10, 1978) is an American sports television producer, personality, sports radio talk show host, and podcaster. Wildes currently serves as a co-host on Fox Sports 1 (FS1)'s First Things First alongside Nick Wright and Chris Broussard.

== Early and personal life ==
Wildes is a native of Groton, Connecticut. Wildes graduated from La Salle University in Philadelphia. In 2011, he married his wife, Libby Geist, who is the sister of television personality Willie Geist.

== Sports broadcasting career ==
=== Television ===
Wildes worked as a coordinating producer on ESPN2 shows SportsNation and Numbers Never Lie. Additionally, Wildes also served as a coordinating producer for Winners Bracket, a part of ESPN Sports Saturday. Wildes also has producing credits on Olbermann, Grantland Basketball Hour, and It's the Shoes. While at ESPN, Wildes became the Vice President of Original Content for NBA Studio Production. He supervised production for NBA Countdown, and also launched and developed The Jump. Wildes also launched and developed Detail by Kobe Bryant for ESPN+.

Later, in 2018, Wildes served as the executive producer for ABC's GMA Day when it launched.

In 2020, Wildes joined FS1 to be an on-air host on First Things First. As of 2026, Wildes remains in that role.

=== Podcasting ===
In 2013, Wildes and David Jacoby co-hosted the Grantland podcast Half-Baked Ideas. Wildes has appeared on multiple podcasts hosted by Bill Simmons. While with ESPN, Simmons hosted The B.S. Report, on which Wildes appeared. Wildes has also made guest appearances on Simmons' eponymous sports podcast. Wildes contributes to the "Half-Baked Ideas" segment on Simmons' podcast.
