= Breakfast Ball =

Sports talk show broadcast by FS1

- Genre: Talk show
- Starring: Craig Carton; Danny Parkins; Mark Schlereth
- Country of origin: United States
- Original language: English

Production
- Production locations: NEP Studios, Manhattan, New York City
- Running time: 120 minutes

Original release
- Network: Fox Sports 1
- Release: August 26, 2024 – July 14, 2025

Breakfast Ball is an American sports and entertainment talk show starring Craig Carton, Danny Parkins, and Mark Schlereth. The series premiered on Fox Sports 1 (FS1) on August 26, 2024, and was later canceled in July 2025.

== History and development ==
When Fox Sports 1 (FS1) launched in 2013, its early morning time slot was used to air game replays and reruns of other shows. Eventually, it was filled by First Things First from 2017 to 2022 and later The Carton Show from 2022 to 2024. The latter show starred its namesake, Craig Carton, alongside other commentators. In 2024, FS1's late morning show Undisputed was cancelled after its host, Skip Bayless, announced he was leaving FS1.

After Undisputed's cancellation, FS1 retooled its programming schedule, and the network announced the new lineup on August 22, 2024. Breakfast Ball was announced for the network's 8 a.m. to 10 a.m. ET early morning slot, serving as a lead in to The Facility, another show that launched as part of FS1's reworked schedule. For its debut week, however, the show aired at 12 p.m. ET. The show launched on FS1 without conducting test shows.

Though Breakfast Ball replaced The Carton Show in FS1's early morning slot, Carton was selected as a host of the new series, as was Chicago-based radio host Danny Parkins and former National Football League (NFL) player Mark Schlereth. Parkins had made guest appearances on FS1's First Things First and The Herd with Colin Cowherd shortly before being announced as a co-host on Breakfast Ball. Schlereth, meanwhile, was a long-time NFL analyst for the network, having made appearances on its various shows and being a color commentator for NFL on Fox game broadcasts. The New York Post reported that Michelle Beadle was also pegged to join the show's hosting lineup, but both Beadle and FS1 "got cold feet at the eleventh hour and decided not to proceed".

On July 14, 2025, The Athletic reported that FS1 was reworking their programming lineup, "likely in time for football season"; in the process, Breakfast Ball was canceled.
