= Danny Parkins =

American sportswriter, talk show host, and podcaster (born 1986)

- Born: October 22, 1986 (age 39)
- Education: Syracuse University
- Occupations: Sports talk radio host and sportswriter
- Spouse: Stephanie Parkins
- Children: 2

Danny Parkins (born October 22, 1986) is an American sportswriter, sports radio talk show host, and podcaster. From 2024 to 2025, Parkins co-hosted the sports talk show Breakfast Ball on Fox Sports 1 (FS1). Though the show was cancelled in July 2025, FS1 retooled its programming lineup, making Parkins a co-host on its First Things First.

== Early and personal life ==
A Chicago native, Parkins was raised in a Jewish family and attended Syracuse University. During his time there, he was a friend and colleague of fellow sports talk host Nick Wright. He graduated from Syracuse in 2009.

He would room with friends in Wrigleyville while unemployed after college, with his income coming from poker winnings. He then moved back to Syracuse in 2010.

== Sports media career ==
Parkins worked at the Kansas City-based KCSP-AM 610. He then became a host on the Chicago sports radio station 670 The Score. Alongside Matt Spiegel, he served as the co-host of the station's Parkins & Spiegel afternoon drive show. In 2021, with the Score, he would host "What About Chicago", a 24-hour radiothon to raise awareness for former Chicago Bears outside linebacker Sam Acho's Athletes for Justice charity, as well as the nonprofit By the Hand Club for Kids. The radiothon raised over $664,000 for the construction of a permanent, full-service facility for Austin Harvest, an open-air market in the Austin neighborhood of Chicago.

In 2024, Parkins made appearances on The Volume's Colin Cowherd Podcast and Fox Sports 1 (FS1)'s First Things First. The eponymous host of the former referred to Parkins as "the most talented sports talk radio host I think out there right now at his age". In July, Parkins hosted two days of Cowherd's The Herd while the latter was on vacation. In August, after the Sun-Times reported his imminent departure from 670 The Score, Parkins affirmed he would be leaving the radio station and join FS1. He was shortly thereafter announced as a co-host of Breakfast Ball, which debuted on the network on August 26. The network cancelled Breakfast Ball in July 2025, though the following month, Parkins joined First Things First as a daily contributor for its third hour.

Parkins also co-authored the book Pipeline to the Pros with Ben Kaplan. The book explored the topic of NCAA Division III alumni making their way to front office or coaching positions in the National Basketball Association (NBA).
