= Baseball's Golden Age =

Television program

Baseball's Golden Age is a television program that chronicles the history of baseball focusing mainly on the 1920s through the 1960s, the "golden age of baseball". It is broadcast on Fox Sports Net Sunday nights at 8 p.m. and is produced by Flagstaff Films. Thirteen 30-minute episodes have been produced. The show has featured material on the effect of World War II on baseball, teams winning the pennant after years of losing, and pieces on individual players, both well known and not so well known. The show also contains never-before-seen footage provided fans, players, and players' families. The first episode featured a segment on "the sights and sounds of the game" which included peanuts and popcorn and the cracking sound of the bat. It also focused on the rivalry between the three New York City teams of the time, the New York Yankees, Brooklyn Dodgers, and New York Giants, and a comparison of Joe DiMaggio and Ted Williams.

The series is narrated by Alec Baldwin. It is produced by Flagstaff Films, headed by Steven Stern, who is a founding partner in Black Canyon Productions, won multiple Peabody and Emmy Awards for such television achievements as the graceful baseball trilogy "When It Was a Game" and the thegloved-fist demonstration at the 1968 Olympics, "Fists of Freedom." The footage for the series comes from Flagstaff Films library, a private collection of baseball film in the U.S

The series is available from Baseball Direct in a special 3-DVD Collection.

== Episode list ==
| No. | Title | Original release date |
|---|---|---|
| 1 | "DiMaggio, Williams & the Great Bambino" | July 6, 2008 |
| 2 | "The Greatest All-Stars Ever" | July 13, 2008 |
| 3 | "When The Game Changed Forever" | July 20, 2008 |
| 4 | "The Boys of Spring" | July 27, 2008 |
| 5 | "Willie, Mickey and the Duke" | August 3, 2008 |
| 6 | "The War Years" | August 10, 2008 |
| 7 | "Baseball's Biggest Move" | August 17, 2008 |
| 8 | "The Dynasty Begins" | August 24, 2008 |
| 9 | "The Greatest Season Ever" | August 31, 2008 |
| 10 | "The Greatest Pitchers of the Era" | September 7, 2008 |
| 11 | "The Shoulders of Giants" | September 14, 2008 |
| 12 | "The Way It Was" | September 21, 2008 |
| 13 | "The Fall Classic" | September 28, 2008 |
