= Undisputed (TV series) =

Sports talk show broadcast by FS1

- Genre: Talk show
- Starring: Skip Bayless; Shannon Sharpe; Richard Sherman; Michael Irvin; Keyshawn Johnson; Rachel Nichols; Lil Wayne
- Theme music composer: Lil Wayne
- Country of origin: United States
- Original language: English

Production
- Production locations: Fox Network Center (Fox Studio Lot Building 101), 10201 W Pico Blvd, Century City, Los Angeles, California
- Running time: 150 minutes

Original release
- Network: Fox Sports 1
- Release: September 6, 2016 – August 2, 2024

Undisputed is an American sports talk show program broadcast by Fox Sports 1 from September 6, 2016, to August 2, 2024. Originally titled Skip and Shannon: Undisputed, episodes aired live Monday through Friday from 9:30 a.m. EST until noon. The show was broadcast from the Fox Network Center in the Century City neighborhood and business district of Los Angeles, California.

== History ==
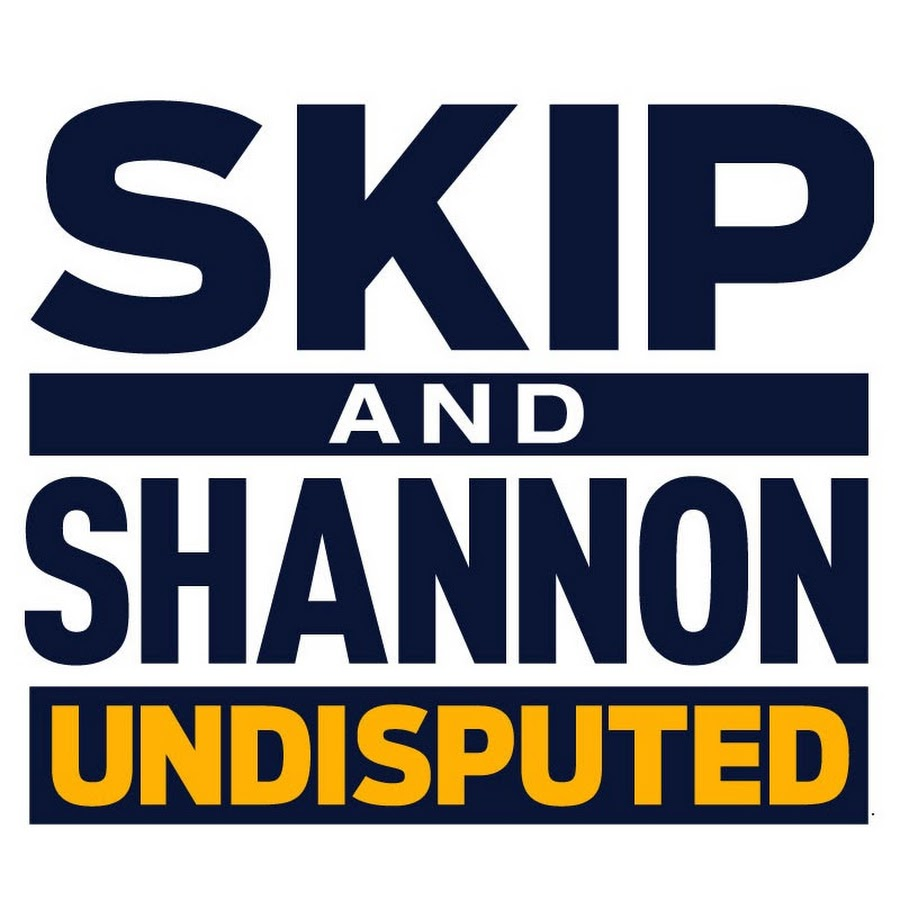
Logo during Shannon Sharpe's tenure on the show (2016–2023)

The series premiered on Fox Sports 1 (FS1) on September 6, 2016.

On June 13, 2023, one day after that year's NBA Finals ended, co-host Shannon Sharpe officially announced that it would be his final episode co-hosting the show with Skip Bayless. Soon after the show went on a brief hiatus the following month. In late August the show returned with a brand new cast featuring former NFL Stars Richard Sherman, Keyshawn Johnson, and Michael Irvin alongside Bayless.

On August 2, 2024, Bayless announced that it would be his final episode of Undisputed and that he would be leaving Fox Sports. On August 5, 2024, FS1 began showing reruns of The Herd with Colin Cowherd and First Things First in Undisputed's time slot with the fate of the show unknown. A week later, it was confirmed that Undisputed had been cancelled by FS1.

== Cast ==
- Skip Bayless: (2016–2024)
- Shannon Sharpe: (2016–2023)
- Keyshawn Johnson (2023–2024)
- Paul Pierce (2024)
- Michael Irvin (2023–2024)
- Rachel Nichols: (2023–2024)
- Richard Sherman: (2023–2024)
- Lil Wayne: (2023–2024)
- Josina Anderson: (2023–2024)

=== Host (full-time) ===
- Joy Taylor: (2016–2018)
- Jenny Taft: (2018–2022)
- Alex Curry:
- Jen Hale: (2022–2023)
- Skip Bayless: (2023–2024)

=== Frequent & past guest analysts ===
- Chris Broussard: NBA/NFL analyst
- Rob Parker: NBA/NFL/MLB analyst
- Eddie House: NBA analyst
- Emmanuel Acho: NFL analyst
- Michael Vick: NFL analyst
- Reggie Bush: NFL/College Football analyst
- Greg Jennings: NFL analyst
- Stephen Jackson: NBA analyst
- LaVar Arrington: NFL analyst
- Colin Cowherd: NBA/NFL analyst
- Eric Dickerson: NFL analyst
- Orlando Scandrick: NFL analyst
- Ray Lewis: NFL analyst
- Ric Bucher: NBA analyst
- Tony Gonzalez: NFL analyst
- Cris Carter: NFL analyst
- DeAngelo Hall: NFL analyst
- Plaxico Burress: NFL analyst
- Kenyon Martin: NBA analyst
- Jason McIntyre: NFL/NBA analyst

== Theme song ==
The show's opening theme song, "No Mercy", was recorded by American rapper Lil Wayne, a friend of Bayless' and a frequent guest from his former ESPN show First Take. The song was written and produced by Jared Gutstadt, president and CCO of Jingle Punks Music, which had partnered with Fox Sports prior to the show's launch. The full-length version of "No Mercy" was released by Cash Money Records to iTunes in September 2016, and Lil Wayne appeared on Undisputed's inaugural episode on September 6 and has since regularly made guest appearances. In 2023, Lil Wayne released the new opening theme song for the revamped Undisputed called "Good Morning".

== Viewership ==
Undisputed averaged 107,000 viewers per episode from September 9 to December 31, 2016, and 155,000 viewers during 2017, representing a 45% increase in viewership.

During July 24–28 of that year, it averaged 136,000 viewers, 65,000 of which were adults in the 18–49 years of age range. Compared to competing weekday morning sports programs in the same time slot, it outdrew ESPN2's edition of Sportscenter (117,000) but fell behind First Take (320,000) in overall viewership.

In 2018, Undisputed averaged 165,000 viewers, and in 2019 through August 9, 2019), averaged 169,000 viewers. In 2021, the show averaged 199,000 viewers during the month of October, which beat the show's previous October peak of 182,000 viewers in 2019 and granting the show its most successful October to date.

As of November 2022, the series' highest-rated broadcast occurred following FS1's English language telecast of England vs Iran, when the show averaged 499,000 viewers.
