= Urban Ministries =

Urban Ministries, Inc. (UMI) is an independent, African American-owned and operated Christian media company founded in 1970. UMI is based in Chicago and publishes Christian resources, including Sunday School and Vacation Bible School curricula, books, movies, and websites designed for African American churches and others seeking a diverse perspective on faith and life issues.

Since its founding, UMI has served over 40,000 churches across the United States, the Caribbean, and Africa. Over 100,000 Sunday School teachers have used their materials. It is evangelical in its theology but rooted in the African American church tradition.

== Founding and history ==
The establishment of Urban Ministries, Inc. was the fulfillment of a boyhood dream that Melvin E. Banks had at the age of 12. Soon after becoming a Christian, Banks gave his testimony on one of the back roads of Birmingham, Alabama. An old, white-haired Black man heard his testimony and quoted this Scripture verse to him: "My people are destroyed for lack of knowledge" (Hosea 4:6). This verse made a great impression on Banks, and he determined to devote his life to educating African Americans with knowledge of the Bible and Christian teaching.

In 1955, Banks graduated from the Moody Bible Institute in Chicago. He went on to Wheaton College (Illinois), where he earned a Bachelor of Arts in Theology and a Master of Arts and Biblical Studies degree. He received an honorary Doctorate from Wheaton College in 1992.

While working at the predominantly white evangelical Christian publishing company Scripture Press, Banks realized the need for resources that would appeal to African Americans. In 1970, a Board of Directors was selected and Banks’s boyhood dream began to take shape with the incorporation of Urban Ministries. During its first 12 years, UMI operated out of the basement of the Banks family’s home. In the spring of 1996, UMI completed construction and took occupancy of a new headquarters facility located in Calumet City, Illinois, in South Suburban Chicago.

== Leadership ==
Founding chairman Melvin Banks authored and edited a number of books and Bible studies. In 2017 the Evangelical Christian Publishers Association (ECPA) presented Dr. Banks with the Kenneth N. Taylor Lifetime Achievement Award for more than 50 years of excellence, innovation, integrity, and commitment to making the message of Christ more widely known. Dr. Banks died on February 13, 2021 at the age of 86.

In 2021, Dr Stanley Long was elected to the post of Chairman after 45 years of working with the company.

In March 2023, UMI announced that Regine Jean-Baptiste had been named publisher and executive vice president of business operations, the first female publisher in the company's 50+ year history.
