= Skip Bayless =

American sports columnist and commentator (born 1951)

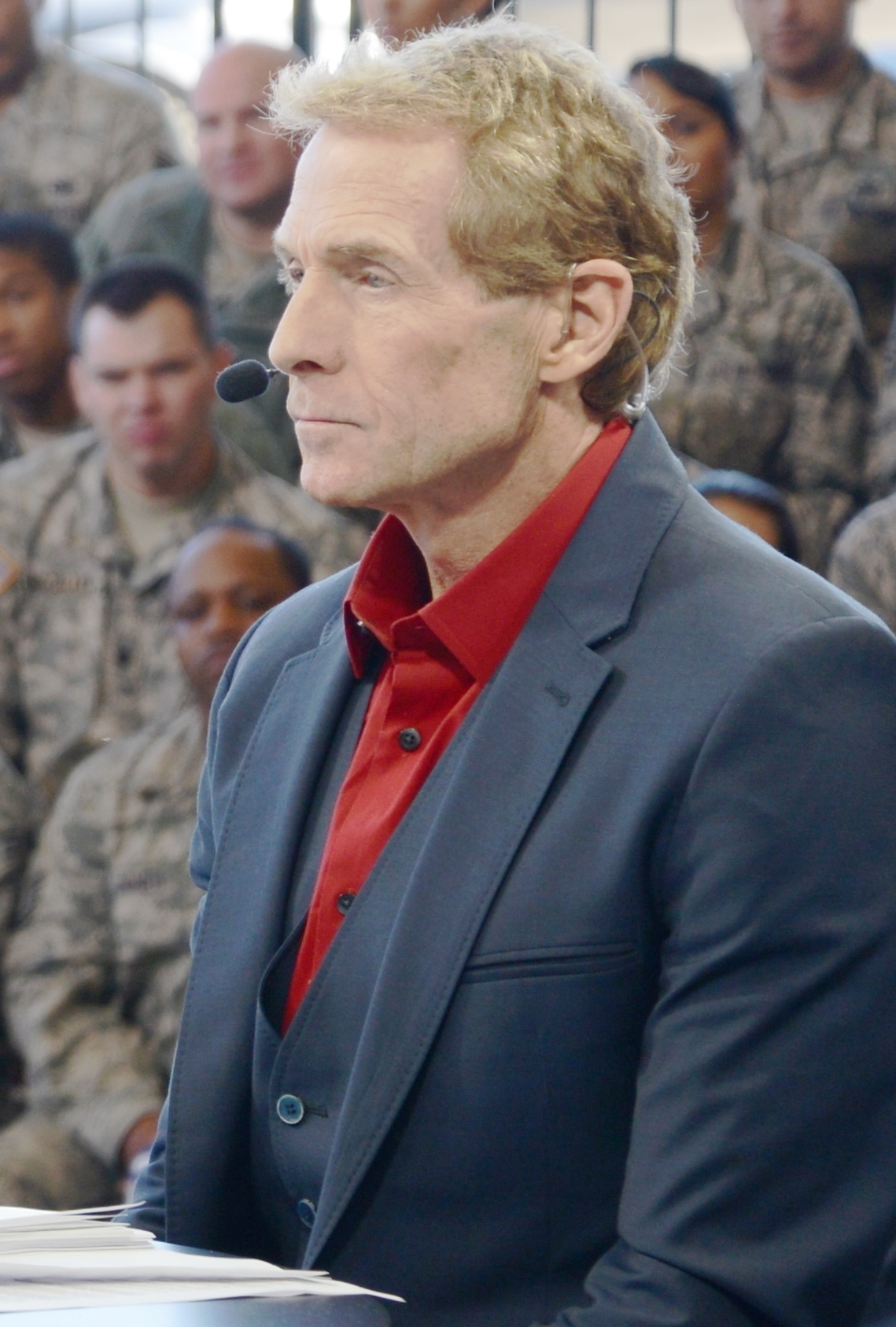
- Bayless in 2014
- Born: John Edward Bayless II; December 4, 1951 (age 74); Oklahoma City, Oklahoma, U.S.
- Education: Vanderbilt University
- Occupations: Sportswriter, television sports commentator
- Notable credit(s): FS1 (Skip and Shannon: Undisputed); 2016–2024; ESPN (Cold Pizza, First Take); 2004–2016; San Jose Mercury News; Chicago Tribune; Dallas Times Herald; Dallas Morning News; Los Angeles Times; Miami Herald
- Spouse: Ernestine Sclafani (m. 2016)
- Family: Rick Bayless (brother)

Skip Bayless (born John Edward Bayless II; born December 4, 1951) is an American sports columnist, commentator, and television personality. He is well-known for his work as a commentator on the ESPN2 show First Take with Stephen A. Smith, a show which he left in June 2016. Bayless debuted his show Skip and Shannon: Undisputed with Shannon Sharpe on Fox Sports 1 in September 2016, which he led for eight years until he left in August 2024.

== Early years ==
John Edward Bayless II was born and raised in Oklahoma City, Oklahoma. His father, John Sr., immediately began calling him Skip—his father also had called his mother "Skip", as in "skipper of the ship". The name instantly stuck, and Bayless was never called John by his parents, to the point that he eventually had his name legally changed to Skip. His parents owned and operated the Hickory House restaurant in Oklahoma City, which specialized in barbecue. Bayless worked in the restaurant in his youth, but never considered it as a career path. His younger brother Rick Bayless carried on the family tradition and became a chef, restaurateur and television personality. He also had a younger sister.

Bayless's interest in sports began at an early age. He played baseball and basketball. Bayless was the salutatorian of Northwest Classen's graduating class of 1970. He was a two-year member of the National Honor Society and president of the school's Fellowship of Christian Athletes chapter. He was also an officer in the letterman's club. At the urging of one of his English teachers, Bayless became the primary sports columnist for the school newspaper his junior and senior years. Prior to his senior year, Bayless represented Northwest Classen at Oklahoma Boys State. Upon graduation, he was awarded the Grantland Rice Scholarship (named for the sportswriter of the same name) to attend Vanderbilt University (Rice's alma mater). While at Vanderbilt, he majored in English and history, and graduated cum laude in 1974. He was a member of Phi Kappa Sigma fraternity, serving two years as the chapter's "rho" (sports director). He was also the sports editor of The Hustler, the university's student newspaper, and spent the summer of 1969 interning under sports editor Frank Boggs at The Daily Oklahoman.

== Career ==
=== Print journalism ===
Bayless went directly from Vanderbilt to The Miami Herald, where he wrote sports features for a little more than two years. He then took a position at the Los Angeles Times in August 1976. There, he was best known for investigative stories on the Los Angeles Dodgers' clubhouse resentment of "golden boy" Steve Garvey and his celebrity wife Cyndy, and on Rams owner Carroll Rosenbloom's behind-the-scenes decisions to start different quarterbacks each week. Bayless won the Eclipse Award for Outstanding Newspaper Writing in 1977 for his coverage of Seattle Slew's Triple Crown victory.

At 26, Bayless was hired by The Dallas Morning News to write its lead sports column, and three years later, joined the Dallas Times Herald. This caught the attention of The Wall Street Journal, prompting the paper to do a story on the development. Bayless was voted Texas sportswriter of the year by the National Sportscasters and Sportswriters Association three times (1979, 1984 and 1986).

In 1989, Bayless wrote his first book, God's Coach: The Hymns, Hype and Hypocrisy of Tom Landry's Cowboys, about the rise and fall of Tom Landry's Dallas Cowboys. Following the Cowboys' Super Bowl victory in 1993, Bayless wrote The Boys: The Untold Story of the Dallas Cowboys' Season on the Edge, and following the third Cowboys Super Bowl win in four seasons, Bayless wrote a third book about the Cowboys, Hell-Bent: The Crazy Truth About the "Win or Else" Dallas Cowboys. Hell-Bent caused a stir, in part, because in the course of writing about the conflict between Cowboys head coach Barry Switzer and star quarterback Troy Aikman, Bayless reported on speculation by Switzer and people close to him within the Dallas organization that Aikman was gay.

In 1998, Bayless left Dallas after 17 years and become the lead sports columnist for the Chicago Tribune. In his first year there, Bayless won the Lisagor Award for excellence in sports column writing, presented by the Chicago Headline Club (the Chicago chapter of the Society of Professional Journalists). In 2000, he was voted Illinois sportswriter of the year by the National Sportscasters and Sportswriters Association. Bayless left the Chicago Tribune in July 2001.

Bayless's work has also appeared in various national sports publications, including Sports Illustrated.

=== Radio ===
In 1991, Bayless began a two-year stint hosting a sports talk radio show from 6–8 p.m. Monday through Friday for Dallas radio station KLIF. In 1994, he became one of the original investors in the Fort Worth radio station KTCK ("the Ticket"), and hosted The Skip Bayless Show from 6–9 a.m. weekdays from 1994 to 1996. In 1996, the original owners sold the station to Cumulus Media, which bought out Bayless's contract. Also in the mid-1990s, he was a frequent guest on ESPN Radio's first national weekday show, The Fabulous Sports Babe. After moving to Chicago, he began making regular appearances on Chet Coppock's show on the Sporting News Radio network, Coppock On Sports. In 2001, he became the primary guest host of the syndicated radio program, The Jim Rome Show. Soon thereafter, Bayless began co-hosting a weekend show on ESPN Radio with former SportsCenter anchor Larry Beil, which aired until 2004, when he moved full-time into television.

=== Television ===
In 1989, Bayless joined host Dick Schaap as a panelist on ESPN's The Sports Reporters, and over the next decade, he was a regular on the Sunday morning show. In 1992, Bayless became a member of the original debate team on NFL Prime Monday's "Knights of the Roundtable" segments with Mitch Albom and Michael Wilbon.

In 1999 and 2000, he provided commentary for the Golf Channel from the major golf championships.

In 2001 and 2002, Bayless appeared regularly on Jim Rome's show on Fox Sports Net, The Last Word. He also made frequent appearances during the same period of time on Fox's The Best Damn Sports Show Period. When Rome moved to ESPN in 2003, Bayless became a fixture on Rome is Burning. He was also featured in a weekly Sunday morning SportsCenter debate segment with Stephen A. Smith, "Old School/Nu Skool".

==== ESPN (2004–2016) ====
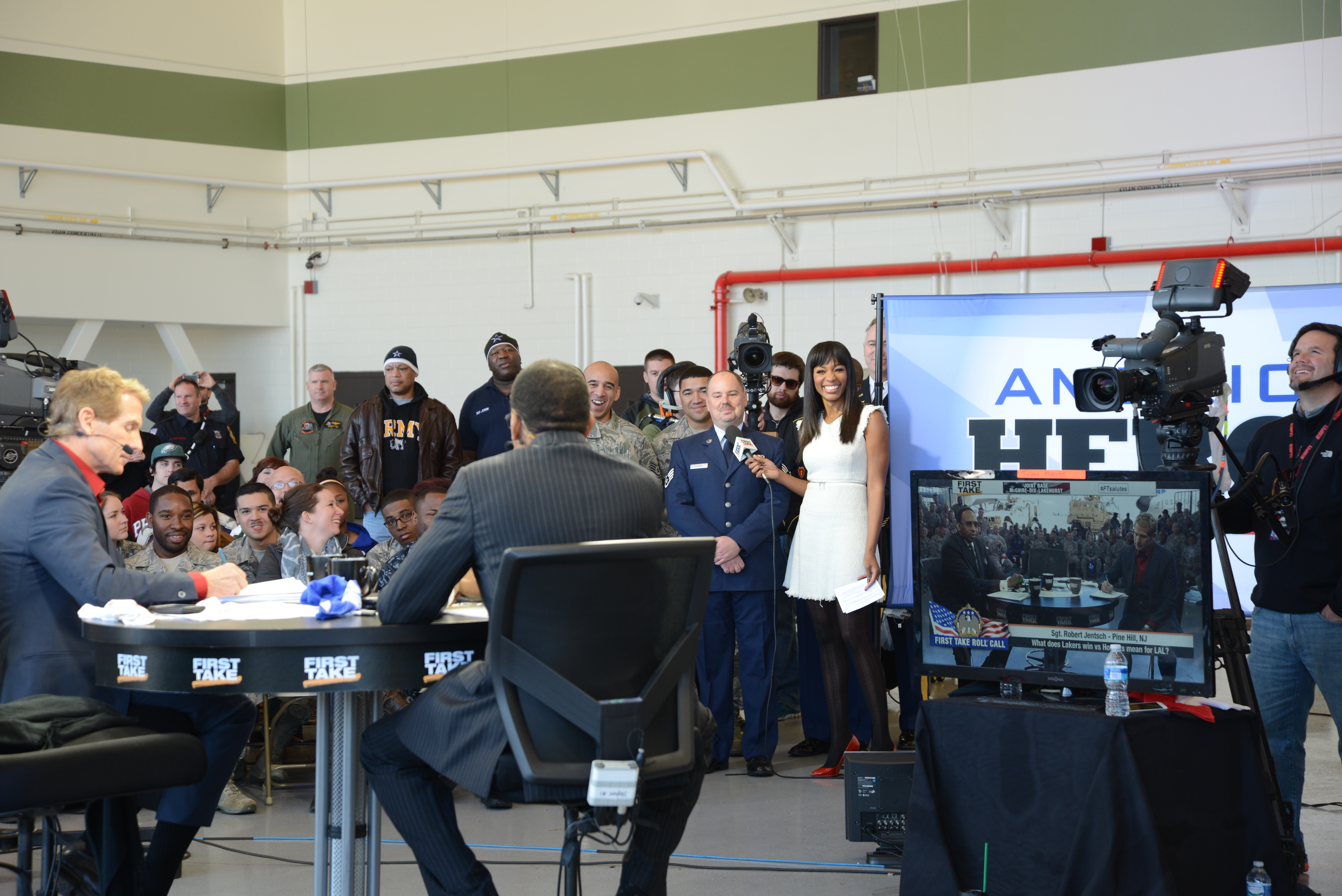
Bayless (left) with Stephen A. Smith and Cari Champion during a First Take broadcast at McGuire Air Force Base in 2014

ESPN hired Bayless full-time in 2004 to team up with Woody Paige of The Denver Post in daily debate segments called "1st and 10" on ESPN2's Cold Pizza, and to write columns for ESPN.com. In May 2007, the show, which had been produced in the network's New York studios, was rebranded as First Take, and production was moved to the network's headquarters in Bristol, Connecticut. Around this time, Bayless stopped writing for ESPN.com; he resumed writing columns for the website in August 2012.

On April 26, 2016, it was reported that Bayless had parted ways with ESPN, and would be moving to Fox Sports after his contract expired in August. His final appearance on First Take was on June 21, 2016.

==== Fox Sports 1 (2016–2024) ====
Bayless debuted Skip and Shannon: Undisputed along with Shannon Sharpe in September 2016 on Fox Sports 1.

Bayless is known for criticizing LeBron James and Aaron Rodgers and praising Tom Brady in both First Take and Skip and Shannon: Undisputed. He is also an outspoken defender of Baker Mayfield. Despite being a staunch Cowboys fan, Bayless has also recently been increasingly critical of Cowboys quarterback Dak Prescott, head coach Mike McCarthy and owner Jerry Jones.

Bayless was criticized for remarks he made on September 10, 2020, about Cowboys quarterback Dak Prescott, such as saying that Prescott's statements about suffering from depression were a sign of "weakness".

In March 2021, Bayless signed a four-year, $32 million contract with Fox Sports.

On January 2, 2023, amid Damar Hamlin's hospitalization for injuries sustained in the Week 17 game between the Buffalo Bills and Cincinnati Bengals, Bayless made a tweet that was widely described as insensitive, stating: "No doubt the NFL is considering postponing the rest of this game - but how? This late in the season, a game of this magnitude is crucial to the regular-season outcome ... which suddenly seems so irrelevant." The tweet was called out by several high-profile sports figures such as former quarterback Robert Griffin III and former wide receiver Dez Bryant. Less than an hour later, Bayless sent out an apology tweet saying "Nothing is more important than that young man's health. That was the point of my last tweet. I'm sorry if that was misunderstood but his health is all that matters. Again, everything else is irrelevant. I prayed for him & will continue to." The day after, Shannon Sharpe did not show up for Undisputed to avoid a possible confrontation about Bayless' tweet. Sharpe left Undisputed in 2023 following the conclusion of the NBA Finals, stemming from a personal attack Bayless made against Sharpe in defense of Tom Brady where Bayless implied Sharpe's criticism of Brady's play was motivated by jealousy over his longevity in the NFL.

Bayless re-launched Undisputed in August 2023 with Richard Sherman, Keyshawn Johnson and Michael Irvin. He left Undisputed and Fox Sports 1 on August 2, 2024, after 8 years on the network.

On January 5, 2025, Bayless was listed as a defendant in a lawsuit filed by former Fox Sports hairstylist Noushin Faraji against the network. Faraji alleges Bayless offered her $1.5 million for sex.

=== Films ===
Along with ESPN colleagues Woody Paige and Jay Crawford, Bayless had a cameo role in the 2006 film Rocky Balboa. The three are seen on their "First and 10" segment discussing a possible fight between a retired Balboa and current heavyweight champion Mason Dixon. Bayless opines that Balboa "was completely overrated" and mocks his age.

He appeared in the 2010 ESPN 30 for 30 film, Pony Excess, about the Southern Methodist University football scandal involving gross violations of NCAA rules and regulations. Bayless covered the Mustangs while writing for both The Dallas Morning News and the Dallas Times Herald. He also appeared in the 2011 ESPNU documentary, Herschel, about University of Georgia running back Herschel Walker.

=== Other honors and awards ===
In 2008, Bayless was selected to the Oklahoma City Wall of Fame recognizing outstanding alumni of Oklahoma City Public Schools. In 2009, he was inducted as one of the five members of the inaugural class of the Vanderbilt Student Media Hall of Fame. In 2012, he received two honors: he was nominated for a Sports Emmy Award in the category of Outstanding Sports Personality, Studio Analyst, and was the co-recipient with DJ Steve Porter of a Webby People's Voice Award in the category of Video Remixes/Mashups for "All He Does Is Win", Porter's mashup of clips of Bayless passionately defending oft-maligned quarterback Tim Tebow.

== Published books as author ==
- God's Coach: The Hymns, Hype, and Hypocrisy of Tom Landry's Cowboys, Simon & Schuster, 1990. ISBN 0-671-70581-4.
- The Boys: The Untold Story of the Dallas Cowboys' Season on the Edge, Simon & Schuster, 1993. ISBN 0-671-79359-4.
- Hell-Bent: The Crazy Truth About the "Win or Else" Dallas Cowboys, HarperCollins Publishers, 1996. ISBN 0-06-018648-8.
