= Fox Sports 1 =

American sports-oriented cable and satellite television channel

- Country: United States
- Broadcast area: Nationwide
- Headquarters: Fox Network Center (Fox Studio Lot Building 101), 10201 W Pico Blvd, Century City, Los Angeles, California

Programming
- Language: English
- Picture format: 720p HDTV; 2160p UHD (selected pay TV partners and via digital media player apps during selected events)

Ownership
- Owner: Fox Corporation
- Parent: Fox Sports Media Group
- Sister channels: Fox Sports 2; Fox Soccer Plus; Fox Deportes; Big Ten Network

History
- Launched: August 17, 2013; 13 years ago
- Replaced: Speed

Links
- Website: www.foxsports.com/live/fs1 www.foxsports.com

Availability

Streaming media
- Fox One: fox.com: (American cable internet subscribers only; requires subscription, trial, or television provider login to access content)
- Fox Sports app: Watch live (U.S. only)
- Service(s): DirecTV Stream, FuboTV, Hulu + Live TV, Sling TV, YouTube TV, Vidgo TV

Fox Sports 1 (branded on-air as FS1) is an American pay television channel owned by the Fox Sports Media Group, a unit of Fox Corporation. FS1 airs an array of live sporting events, including Major League Baseball and the World Baseball Classic, college sports (most notably Big Ten, Pac-12 and Big 12 football, and Big East basketball), soccer matches (including Major League Soccer, Liga MX, CONCACAF Champions Cup, and FIFA World Cup), and a variety of motorsports events. FS1 also features daily sports news, analysis and discussion programming as well as sports-related reality and documentary programs.

FS1 replaced the motorsports-centric network Speed on August 17, 2013, while its companion channel Fox Sports 2 replaced Fuel TV. Both FS1 and FS2 carried over most of the sports programming from their predecessors, as well as content from Fox Soccer, which would then be replaced by the entertainment-based channel FXX on September 2, 2013.

The network is based primarily from the Fox Sports division's headquarters on the Fox Studio Lot in the Century City section of Los Angeles, though the network also has significant broadcast operations in New York City and Charlotte, North Carolina (the latter of which had served as Speed's home base).

As of September 2018, Fox Sports 1 was available to approximately 83.3 million pay television households (90.3% of households with cable) in the United States. As of June 2023, the channel's reach had been reduced to 72.4 million homes.

== Background ==
=== Development ===
In March 2012, reports began circulating that Fox Entertainment Group had plans to launch a national Fox Sports cable network by August 2013 known as Fox Sports 1, giving the sports division a dedicated cable presence to better compete against established networks like ESPN. Fox was already a major force in cable sports programming, having operated several niche channels such as Fox Soccer, Fox Deportes, Fuel TV and Fox College Sports. Also in its portfolio were the Fox Sports Networks, a group of regional sports networks both owned by Fox outright or by other companies through affiliation agreements with FSN; in addition to carrying play-by-play rights to several local sports teams, these regional networks also featured common national content produced and distributed by Fox Sports, including national college sports broadcasts and specialty programs such as The Best Damn Sports Show Period and Baseball's Golden Age.

Though this local/national hybrid approach gave Fox prominence at the local sports level, it was somewhat disadvantaged as its flagship over-the-air network had the distinction of being the only major U.S. broadcast television network not to have a national general sports channel to complement its sports division, unlike ABC (whose corporate parent The Walt Disney Company owns an 80% stake in and operating control of ESPN), CBS (which operates CBS Sports Network) and NBC (which operated NBCSN).

The reports indicated that Fox planned on converting one of these niche sports channels, Speed – which focused on auto racing and other motorsports – into the new Fox Sports 1 due to its established reach on U.S. pay television providers (Speed maintained a subscriber base of 81 million homes with cable, IPTV or satellite service by 2012), which would result in the reduction of the channel's commitment to NASCAR and other motorsports coverage.

Further supporting this theory, reports surfaced in January 2013 that Fox Soccer would be relaunched as FXX, a general entertainment network that would be spun off from FX and would feature comedy series and feature films; such reports were confirmed when the channel's planned launch was officially announced by Fox Entertainment Group on March 28, 2013. In October 2012, Speed altered its on-air logo bug to include the Fox Sports logo above its own, which was believed to indicate a step towards this replacement. Fox Sports would officially confirm the conversion of Speed into Fox Sports 1 in an announcement on March 5, 2013.

Despite being established well after ESPN (which launched in 1979), and the NBC- and CBS-owned sports networks (which respectively launched in 1996 and 2003 under different ownership and branding), Fox Sports 1, even before commencing programming, has been seen as a legitimate and serious competitor to ESPN, in part due to three factors:

- Audience reach – By taking over Speed's transponder space, Fox Sports 1 was expected to reach 90 million households at the time of its launch (with most cable and satellite providers carrying it on the channel slot, almost entirely through distribution on basic cable tiers, that Speed had occupied on their channel lineups). While that number is relatively less than ESPN's total reach at that time (99 million homes), it is also more than the 77.9 million homes that NBCSN reached at the beginning of 2013, which was hamstrung by some of its reach being only through carriage on digital cable tiers.
- Brand awareness – Fox heavily promoted Fox Sports 1's launch through its various television, online and social media platforms, including appearances of Fox Sports 1 talent on existing Fox programming and the online posting of its shows' pre-launch rehearsals.
- Programming strategy – Fox was aggressive in seeking and securing major content for FS1, employing a strategy to obtain rights to popular sports and leagues that they believed other networks underserved, as well as creating high-profile original shows (see Programming below).

Fox Sports executives see Fox Sports 1 as "an alternative to the establishment", much as the Fox Broadcasting Company was to other broadcast networks in the 1980s and Fox News Channel was to CNN in the 1990s. In terms of growth, Fox Entertainment Group acknowledged that Fox Sports 1 would start modestly and not be competitively equal with ESPN right out of the gate; however, the company foresaw the network growing incrementally, believing that the channel would be on-par with its senior competitor within a few years of its launch. Viewership figures for the end of 2019, however, showed FS1 over 1.4 million viewers behind ESPN and even trailing NBCSN by 17,000.

=== Launch and carriage ===
Original logo, used full-time from August 17, 2013, to May 2015; currently used as an alternate logo.

Fox Sports 1 formally launched on August 17, 2013, at 6:00 a.m. Eastern Time, with the following introduction:

Good morning and welcome to the very first day of Fox Sports 1. Here on America's new sports network, our promise to you is that we will share your passion for the game, never take ourselves too seriously, and, most importantly, never put ourselves above the game nor the athletes. We will be informative without ever sacrificing accuracy. We work for you, the fan, and every day we will live up to this simple promise. Now let's get on with the show.

— Curt Menefee, co-host of Fox NFL Sunday

The launch day featured 16½ hours of live sports coverage, including NASCAR coverage during the late morning and afternoon (highlighted by a Camping World Truck Series qualifying round and race), five hours of UFC bouts in the evening (the main event of the Fight Night card being a match between Maurício Rua and Chael Sonnen), and the premiere of the sports news and discussion show Fox Sports Live following the conclusion of the UFC event.

Although marketed as a relaunch of Speed, Fox Sports 1 was contractually considered to be a new channel; due to its change in scope from automotive and motorsports to mainstream sports, Fox was required to reach new deals with providers for them to carry the network. At first, Fox sought a higher carriage fee as well, estimated at 80¢ per subscriber (more than triple the subscriber fee of 23¢ that Speed had commanded; by comparison, ESPN pulls in fees of approximately $5.00 per subscriber, the most expensive fee of any pay television network). Concerns by providers over the increasing costs for cable and satellite services for their customers (largely believed to be partly due to the higher fees commanded by certain sports channels) resulted in Fox backing off charging the 80¢ per subscriber rate, instead charging the same 23¢ rate that those providers paid to carry Speed. For any remaining providers that had not reached a deal to carry Fox Sports 1, Fox planned to offer a version of Speed with limited programming on an interim basis until a deal was reached, in order to fulfill existing contracts that required Fox to provide a motorsports channel.

Carriage deals were made by the launch date with all major cable and satellite providers, including cable/telco providers Comcast, Charter Communications, Cox Communications, Verizon FiOS, AT&T U-verse, Cablevision, Bright House Networks, Mediacom, Suddenlink Communications, Cable One and Time Warner Cable, as well as satellite providers DirecTV and Dish Network. The deals with Time Warner, Dish and DirecTV – which were announced just days before FS1's launch – were seen as crucial to the network, as those three providers had a combined reach of over 40 million households, nearly half the goal of 90 million homes that FS1 set for its launch.

International markets that previously received the U.S. version of Speed (such as Canada, the Caribbean, and the U.S. territory of Puerto Rico) did not gain access to Fox Sports 1 upon its relaunch; in Canada, the Canadian Radio-television and Telecommunications Commission permitted the carriage of Speed as a foreign service, but Fox did not seek carriage of FS1 in that country (some of the sports event programming that Fox Sports 1 holds the broadcast rights to carry already air in that country on domestic sports networks such as TSN and Sportsnet). A version of Speed remains operational for these markets (now known as Fox Sports Racing), airing a lineup of past Speed reality shows, and coverage of NASCAR and other motorsports events simulcast with Fox Sports 1 or Fox Sports 2. In early 2014, some major Canadian service providers began to drop the channel upon the expiration of their contractual rights to carry Speed.

=== Post-launch ===
In 2015, Fox Sports 1 added coverage of selected NASCAR Sprint Cup Series events, USGA championship events, FIFA tournaments, and Major League Soccer. In July of that year (coinciding with the 2015 FIFA Women's World Cup), the network began to phase out the use of the full "Fox Sports 1" name and logo from on-air and promotional usage, identifying the network as simply "FS1" with a new wordmark logo. A representative for Fox Sports stated that was intended to streamline the channel's marketing, and reflect common usage.

On July 14, 2015, Fox Sports reached a long-term agreement with the National Hot Rod Association (NHRA) to broadcast its drag racing events beginning in 2016. Fox's package includes coverage of Friday and Saturday qualifying, and Sunday elimination races for NHRA Mello Yello Drag Racing Series events (with a minimum of 16 elimination races presented live, and the remainder shown either on weekend afternoons or in primetime; four of the live elimination races would be aired by the main Fox network, with the rest, as well as encores, on FS1 and FS2), and coverage of select NHRA Lucas Oil Drag Racing Sportsman Series events on FS1. The contract succeeded one with ESPN.

On March 21, 2018, Fox Sports announced that it had acquired the television rights for the PBA Tour of ten-pin bowling, beginning in 2019 (once again replacing ESPN). 26 broadcasts in the 2019 season are scheduled to air on FS1, with four additional broadcasts to air on the main Fox network.

== Programming ==
=== Event coverage ===
Sports programming on FS1 includes the following:

Baseball

- Major League Baseball (2014–present)
  - 40 regular season MLB games (mostly on Saturdays)
  - Up to 15 post-season games (eight Divisional Series games and one best-of-seven League Championship Series)
- World Baseball Classic (2023–present)

Basketball

- The Basketball Tournament (2024–present)

Bowling

- PBA Tour (2019–present)

College

- NCAA football and basketball (2013–present)
  - Big East men's and women's basketball (2013–present)
  - Big 12 football and men's and women's basketball (2013–present)
  - Pac-12 football and men's basketball (2013–2024)
  - Big Ten football and men's and women's basketball (2017–present)
  - Mountain West football and men's and women's basketball (2020–present)

Dog shows

- Westminster (2017–present)

Football

- UFL (2024–present, previously carried predecessors XFL in 2020, TSL from 2020–21 and USFL from 2022–23)

Futsal

- FIFA Futsal World Cup (exclusive coverage of the 2016, 2020 and 2024 FIFA Futsal World Cup)

Horse racing

- Up to 10 graded stakes races (2014–present)
- Two top stakes races (2014–present)
- New York Racing Association select races (America's Day at the Races, 2020–present)

Motorsports

- ARCA Menards Series (2013–present)
- IndyCar Series (2025–present)
  - Qualifying races
  - Indy NXT races
- NASCAR (2013–present)
  - NASCAR Cup Series (2013–present)
  - NASCAR Craftsman Truck Series (2013–present)
- National Hot Rod Association (2016–present)
  - NHRA Mission Foods Drag Racing Series; coverage of Friday and Saturday qualifying, and Sunday eliminations
  - NHRA Lucas Oil Drag Racing Series; Select Sportsman eliminations
  - NHRA J&A Service Pro Mod Drag Racing Series

Rugby union

- Major League Rugby (2020–2024)

Soccer

- CONCACAF (2013–present)
  - CONCACAF Gold Cup (2014–present)
  - CONCACAF Champions League (2020–present)
  - CONCACAF Men's Olympic Qualifying Tournament (2020)
- FIFA World Cup (exclusive coverage of the 2018, 2022 and 2026 FIFA World Cup)
- FIFA Women's World Cup (exclusive coverage of the 2015, 2019 and 2023 FIFA Women's World Cup)
- FIFA U-20 World Cup
- FIFA U-20 Women's World Cup
- FIFA U-17 World Cup
- FIFA U-17 Women's World Cup
- UEFA European Championship (qualifiers and finals tournament for 2024 and 2028)
- UEFA Nations League (2022–23 until 2026–27)
- UEFA Women's Championship (2025)
- Coupe de France(2023–present)
- Liga MX
  - Tijuana home matches (2018–present)
  - Monterrey home matches (2018–present)
  - Santos home matches (2019–present)
- Major League Soccer (2015–present; 34 regular season matches)
  - MLS All-Star Game (2015–2022; rights alternated with ESPN until 2022)

=== News and analysis programming ===
FS1 airs various studio shows mainly involving debating sports topics, especially in the afternoon and early evening. In May 2015, Fox Sports hired Jamie Horowitz, formerly of ESPN, to oversee the channel as Fox Sports' President of National Networks. Following his arrival, FS1 began to pivot its studio programming towards opinion-oriented panel shows similar to those he oversaw on ESPN, and also hired away several notable personalities from ESPN, such as Skip Bayless and Colin Cowherd (who were featured on new programs such as Speak for Yourself and Skip and Shannon: Undisputed). Horowitz likened this strategy, which has been referred to as "embrace debate", to that of sister property Fox News Channel; he argued that fewer viewers were watching conventional sports news programs such as SportsCenter due to the ubiquity of online news and highlights, but that there were "record highs" for opinion programs.

After Horowitz's exit from Fox, his replacement Mark Silverman (who came from Big Ten Network) admitted that FS1 had matured and "grown past 'embrace debate'", emphasizing a focus on offering shows that are "smart, entertaining and interesting to sports fans", alongside opinion-based programs.

In September 2018, FS1 premiered a sports betting-related studio program, Lock It In, which featured Clay Travis as well as Vegas bookie Todd Fuhrman, former Jimmy Kimmel Live! sidekick "Cousin Sal" Iacono, and Rachel Bonnetta. The show was renamed Fox Bet Live, to tie it in with the Fox Sports gambling app of the same name. The program would be canceled in 2022.

==== Daily ====
- Wake Up Barstool (weekdays live 8–10 a.m., replayed 10 a.m.–noon Eastern) – Sports talk show hosted by Dave Portnoy and various other Barstool Sports personalities, broadcast from Barstool's office in Chicago.
- The Herd with Colin Cowherd (weekdays noon–3 p.m. Eastern) – Simulcast of Colin Cowherd's radio program on Fox Sports Radio.
- First Things First (weekdays 3–6 p.m. Eastern) – Panel discussion program with Chris Broussard, Nick Wright, and Kevin Wildes
- TMZ Sports (late nights) – Spinoff of the syndicated TMZ celebrity gossip show, but focused specifically on athletes.

==== Seasonal ====
- Big Noon Kickoff (Saturday mornings) – Simulcast of the college football pregame show on Fox
- NASCAR RaceDay (Saturday afternoon or Sunday morning depending on the race time) – A pre-race show for the NASCAR Cup Series, hosted by Shannon Spake or Adam Alexander with Bobby Labonte and Jamie McMurray providing analysis; the program was carried over to the network from Speed.
- NASCAR Race Hub (weekdays 6–7 p.m. Eastern) – A daily program featuring news and analysis on the NASCAR circuit, including reviews of previous races and previews of upcoming action; the program was carried over to the network from Speed. The show ended on June 11, 2024.

==== Former ====
Daily/Weekly

- America's Pregame (weeknights 5:00–6:00 p.m. Eastern; April 7, 2014 – October 2, 2015) – An early evening preview of the night's sports action; the program was cancelled on September 30, 2015, due to low ratings.
- Breakfast Ball (weekdays 8–10 a.m. Eastern) – Morning talk/interview program hosted by Craig Carton, Mark Schlereth and Danny Parkins
- The Facility (weekdays 10 a.m.–noon Eastern) – Panel discussion program with Emmanuel Acho, LeSean McCoy, James Jones, and Chase Daniel
- Crowd Goes Wild (August 17, 2013 - May 8, 2014) – Daily talk show hosted by Regis Philbin and featuring Katie Nolan.
- Fox NFL Kickoff (Sundays 11:00 a.m.–12:00 p.m. Eastern during the NFL season; August 18, 2013 – January 18, 2015) – A program previewing the day's NFL action, it serves as the supplementary program to the Fox Broadcasting Company's existing pre-game show Fox NFL Sunday. Fox NFL Kickoff moved to Fox on September 13, 2015, in an effort to boost the program's low viewership and to serve as a lead-in for Fox NFL Sunday.
- Fox Sports Live with Jay and Dan (nightly 11:00 p.m.–11:30 p.m. Eastern; August 17, 2013 – February 22, 2017) – Fox Sports 1's flagship sports news program, which aired directly opposite ESPN's SportsCenter on most nights. The program was primarily anchored by Jay Onrait and Dan O'Toole, who came to FS1 from the Canadian sports channel TSN, where the pair gained popularity for their irreverent and humorous presentation of sports news while serving as anchors of the late-night editions of that network's SportsCentre. The show's first run featured analysis and opinions on that night's events and that day's sports news, with Jay and Dan discussing the day's major stories from FS1's sister channels (such as Big Ten Network). In February 2016, the show was rebranded as a late night talk show in order to appeal to a younger generation and to boost low ratings. The program was cancelled on February 23, 2017.
- The Mike Francesa Show (2014–2015) – WFAN radio host Mike Francesa agreed to simulcast a portion of his show on Fox Sports 1 and Fox Sports 2. However, the arrangement ended after only one year, on September 11, 2015. Francesa took full blame for the partnership not succeeding.
- Garbage Time with Katie Nolan – Fox Sports 1's weekly program was aired from March 15, 2015, to February 2017; de facto cancelled upon Nolan's move to ESPN.
- Speak (weekdays 5–7 p.m. Eastern; replayed late nights) Panel discussion program with Joy Taylor, Keyshawn Johnson and Paul Pierce
- UFC Tonight (Wednesdays 7 p.m. Eastern) – Hosted by Kenny Florian and Karyn Bryant, the program features the latest news, highlights, and analysis from the UFC; this program was carried over to FS1 from Fuel TV (now Fox Sports 2). This program ended in December 2018 due to UFC signing a deal with ESPN starting in 2019.
- Fair Game with Kristine Leahy (weekdays 5:30 p.m. Eastern; October 2018 – December 2019) - Fox Sports 1's daily half-hour interview program was aired from October 2018 to December 2019.
- Undisputed with Skip Bayless and Shannon Sharpe (weekdays 10 AM ET to 12 PM ET; September 6 - August 2, 2024) - Originally titled Skip And Shannon: Undisputed, this program was developed by Jamie Horowitz, who was known, in part, for developing the then-ESPN2 program First Take. Initially helmed by Joy Taylor, and featuring pro bowler and former CBS Sports analyst Shannon Sharpe across from former First Take cohost Skip Bayless, the debate program served as a direct competitor to the ESPN program First Take. Despite a positive reception, by 2023 it became infamously plagued by rumors of a rift between the cohosts and subsequent reshuffling of on-air talent, migrating to a panel show format hosted by Skip Bayless, Keyshawn Johnson, Paul Pierce, Michael Irvin, and Richard Sherman before ending its run in 2024.

Live events

Boxing

- Premier Boxing Champions (2015–2022)

Football

- XFL (2020)

Golf

- USGA Championships (2015–2019)
  - U.S. Open (2015–2019; live coverage of the first two rounds)
  - U.S. Senior Open (2015–2019; live coverage of the first two rounds)
  - U.S. Women's Open (2015–2019; live coverage of the first two rounds)
  - U.S. Senior Women's Open (2018–2019)
  - U.S. Men's, Women's and Junior Amateur Championships (2015–2019)
  - U.S. Men's and Women's Four-Ball Championships (2015–2019)
- Curtis Cup (2018)

Motorsports

- Formula E (2014–2020)
- NASCAR Xfinity Series (2015–2024)

Soccer

- U.S. Men's National Soccer Team (2015–2022); rights to all matches shared with ESPN)
- U.S. Women's National Soccer Team (2015–2022); rights to all matches shared with ESPN)
- German Bundesliga (2015–2020)
  - DFL-Supercup (2015–2020)
  - Bundesliga relegation playoffs (2015–2020)

College

- Holiday Bowl (2017–2019)

== Related channels ==
=== Fox Sports 2 ===
FS2 serves as a secondary outlet and overflow channel for FS1's mainstream sports programming. It launched alongside FS1 in August 2013.

== Carriage disputes ==
In February 2015, Fox Sports 1 became part of a carriage dispute with AT&T U-verse, as Fox Sports Media Group pursued higher carriage fees for the network to cover the cost of sports broadcast rights that had been acquired by the group to fill FS1's schedule since its launch. AT&T declined to accept these additional fees, with a representative for the provider stating that "while it's important to us that we provide our customers with the content they want, we don't believe that it is reasonable to pass on the added costs of carrying this programming to our customer." Rather than pull the channel outright, Fox instead began blacking out certain sporting events carried by FS1 on U-verse, including certain NASCAR, Major League Soccer, Major League Baseball and college basketball events.
