= LeSean McCoy =

American football player (born 1988)

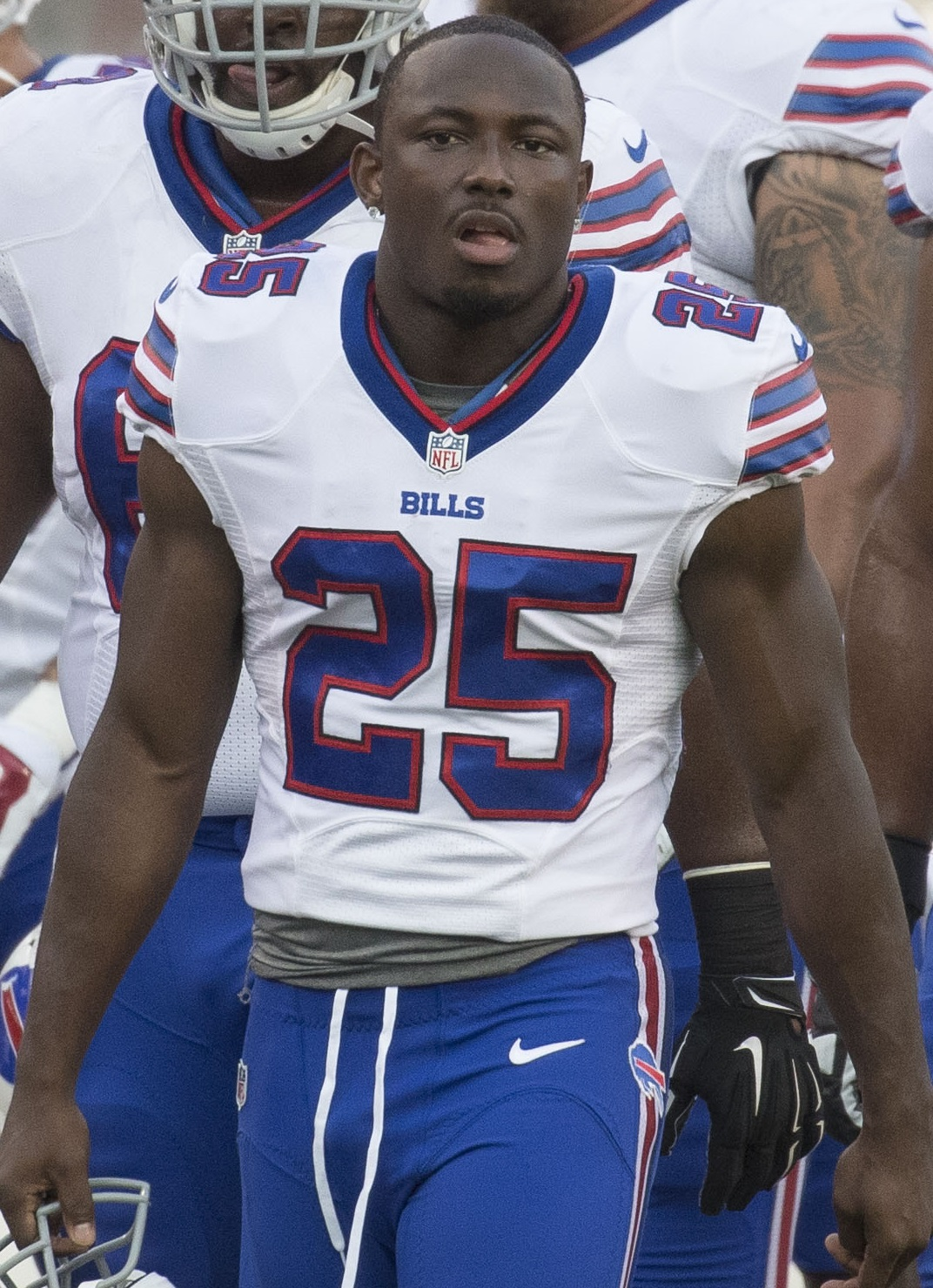
- McCoy with the Buffalo Bills in 2016

No. 29, 25
- Position: Running back

Personal information
- Born: July 12, 1988 (age 38); Harrisburg, Pennsylvania, U.S.
- Listed height: 5 ft 11 in (1.80 m)
- Listed weight: 210 lb (95 kg)

Career information
- High school: Bishop McDevitt (Harrisburg)
- College: Pittsburgh (2007–2008)
- NFL draft: 2009: 2nd round, 53rd overall pick

Career history
- Philadelphia Eagles (2009–2014); Buffalo Bills (2015–2018); Kansas City Chiefs (2019); Tampa Bay Buccaneers (2020)

Awards and highlights
- 2× Super Bowl champion (LIV, LV); 2× First-team All-Pro (2011, 2013); 6× Pro Bowl (2011, 2013–2017); NFL rushing yards leader (2013); NFL rushing touchdowns leader (2011); Philadelphia Eagles Hall of Fame; NFL 2010s All-Decade Team; Second-team All-American (2008); Big East Rookie of the Year (2007); 2× First-team All-Big East (2007, 2008)

Career NFL statistics
- Rushing yards: 11,102
- Rushing average: 4.5
- Rushing touchdown: 73
- Receptions: 518
- Receiving yards: 3,898
- Receiving touchdowns: 16
- Stats at Pro Football Reference

LeSean Kamel McCoy (born July 12, 1988), nicknamed "Shady", is an American former professional football player who was a running back in the National Football League (NFL). He played college football for the Pittsburgh Panthers and was selected by the Philadelphia Eagles in the second round of the 2009 NFL draft.

McCoy attended Bishop McDevitt High School from 2002 to 2006. In his senior year of high school, McCoy suffered a major ankle injury, which threatened his career. In his first year at Pittsburgh in 2007, he rushed for over 1,300 yards and recorded 14 touchdowns. In 2008, McCoy was selected as a second-team All-American. His 21 rushing touchdowns were third in the nation, only one behind the two leaders.

In 2010, he took over as the starting running back for the Eagles, and broke the 1,000-yard rushing barrier. In 2011, McCoy was named first-team All-Pro. In 2012, McCoy suffered a concussion that limited him to only 12 games. In 2013, McCoy led the NFL in rushing yards with 1,607, shattering the team's individual single-season rushing yards record that stood for 34 years. McCoy went on to become the all-time leading rusher for the Eagles after the 2014 season, breaking the record previously held by Wilbert Montgomery.

In the 2015 offseason, McCoy was traded to the Buffalo Bills in exchange for linebacker Kiko Alonso. After the trade, he signed a new five-year contract worth $40 million. McCoy made the Pro Bowl in each of his first three years in Buffalo, helping the team snap a 17-year playoff drought, and became one of a few select NFL running backs to surpass 10,000 career rushing yards. After playing four seasons with the Bills, he was released prior to the 2019 season. He finished his career with one season stints with the Kansas City Chiefs and Tampa Bay Buccaneers in 2019 and 2020 respectively, winning a Super Bowl each season.

McCoy was named to the NFL 2010s All-Decade Team; no player scored more touchdowns, ran for more yards, or gained more yards from scrimmage than McCoy did from 2010 to 2019.

After retiring, McCoy ventured into sports media. Since September 2024, McCoy has served as a co-host on the American sports and entertainment talk show The Facility on Fox Sports 1 (FS1) alongside Emmanuel Acho, Chase Daniel, and James Jones.

== Early life ==
McCoy was born in Harrisburg, Pennsylvania. His nickname is "Shady" and was given to him by his mother because of his mood swings where one second he would be happy and laughing and the next second would be upset and crying. He attended Bishop McDevitt High School in Harrisburg, the same high school attended by NFL running back Ricky Watters. He played high school football for the Crusaders while there.

As a sophomore, he once rushed for 406 yards in a game. As a junior, he ran for 2,828 yards, scored 35 touchdowns, and earned Associated Press Class AAAA player of the year, Offensive MVP of the Mid-Penn Commonwealth Conference, 1st team Associated Press All-State. As a high school senior, he earned first team Class AAAA Associated Press All-State; During his senior season, McCoy had committed to Miami. However, academic issues and a broken ankle led McCoy to attend prep school at Milford Academy in New Berlin, New York for the 2006–07 school year. He had been invited to play in the Big 33 Football Classic and the U.S. Army All-American Bowl that year, but ultimately did not participate in those games as he was still recovering from his injury. Following a coaching change at Miami, McCoy committed to the University of Pittsburgh on February 16, 2007.

At the 2004 State College NIKE Training Camp, McCoy recorded a 4.23 40-yard dash, the fastest 40-time of the event.

McCoy was "rated the nation's number 11 high school prospect" by recruiting analyst Tom Lemming. A 2006 ESPN evaluation described him as "lightning in a bottle every time he touches the ball."

In 2012, McCoy's high school number (20) was retired at Bishop McDevitt. The only other McDevitt player whose number has been retired is Ricky Watters.

== College career ==
=== Freshman year ===
McCoy entered Pittsburgh after finishing at Milford Academy. He started the season as a backup to LaRod Stephens-Howling who was the starting running back in 2006 and rushed for over 890 yards the previous season. In August 2007, Dave Grdnic wrote for Panthers Digest, "After just one week, LeSean McCoy has been as amazing as advertised. He's been dynamic on the field and off, banging up the middle on runs as hard as he bolts around end and talking just as good a game to the media.

As a freshman, McCoy was the point-man for the "Wildcat offense" which the Pittsburgh Panthers unveiled in a September 2007 game against the Michigan State Spartans. In the Wildcat offense, McCoy lined up as quarterback in a shotgun formation and took direct snaps from center, A Sporting News article credited him for having one of the "best starts by a freshman running back at Pittsburgh since Tony Dorsett", while the Wildcat offense was criticized. "McCoy might need to be a combination of both Dorsett and Dan Marino for the Panthers to start producing some offense other than through his running." On October 2, 2007, ESPN writer Pat Forde featured McCoy under the "instant impact" section of his column. Forde had this to say, "Pittsburgh. When starting running back LaRod Stephens-Howling got hurt, McCoy stepped in and Wally Pipped him. McCoy has 503 rushing yards and six touchdowns, averaging six yards a carry." McCoy had a streak of four consecutive games, from October 10 to November 3, where he rushed for at least 120 yards. He rushed for a season-high 172 yards against Michigan State on September 15, just his third game at Pittsburgh. McCoy finished his freshman year ranked third in the Big East Conference and 25th in the NCAA Division I FBS (formerly I-A) in rushing yards with 1,328. McCoy was named to the Freshman All-American team by Rivals.com and was also a first team All-Big East selection by Rivals.com. In his final game of his freshman year, McCoy ran for 148 yards against rival West Virginia in the 100th Backyard Brawl to help the 28-point underdog Panthers defeat the then #2 Mountaineers. That win also knocked West Virginia from a probable spot in the BCS National Championship Game.

=== Sophomore year ===
McCoy entered his sophomore year as one of the top running backs in college football. In an article written by Paul Zeise of the Pittsburgh Post-Gazette in late July 2008, McCoy's coach Dave Wannstedt had this to say about McCoy's approach in the off-season, "He's been very mature, he's taken the right approach," Wannstedt said. "I like to see a talented young guy who takes the initiative to want to be the best he can be and he clearly is doing his part." In mid August 2008, Pro Football Hall of Famer, Tony Dorsett told the Associated Press that "He (McCoy) reminded me of me. That looked a lot like No.33 (Dorsett).

Pittsburgh started the 2008 season ranked inside the top 25 for the first time in five years. The Panthers faced Bowling Green at home to start the season, but fell to the Falcons 27–17. McCoy had one rushing touchdown and 71 rushing yards in a losing effort. This was McCoy's second lowest rushing total of the season. McCoy and the Panthers proceeded to win seven out of their next eight games. He had a streak of five games from September 27 to November 1 where he recorded over 140 rushing yards per game. During that five-game streak, he had 762 rushing yards and 10 rushing touchdowns. McCoy's best game was still ahead of him. After suffering a loss on the road to Cincinnati, a game in which McCoy led Pittsburgh in both rushing and receiving yards, Pittsburgh got a win at home against the West Virginia Mountaineers and McCoy rushed for 183 yards that day, setting a career-high which was previously 172, set during his freshman year. He also added two touchdowns that day, both coming in the fourth quarter. McCoy closed out the regular season with 95 rushing yards a touchdown in a winning effort 34–10 against the Connecticut Huskies. The Panthers were ranked #18 in the AP Poll following the win against the Huskies. McCoy's final college football game of his career was the 2008 Sun Bowl played on New Year's Eve in El Paso, Texas. He rushed for 85 yards, and the Panthers fell in a defensive battle to Oregon State by a score of 3–0.

McCoy had said in November 2008 and in January 2009 that he was coming back to Pittsburgh for his junior year. On January 7, 2009, McCoy notified Wannstedt of his decision to go pro. However, he delayed the decision until January 14, when he officially announced he was leaving for the NFL. Talking to Larry Fitzgerald of the Arizona Cardinals, who also left after two years, helped sway McCoy. The team's performance in the Sun Bowl, did not have any influence though. On January 14, 2009, the University of Pittsburgh announced that McCoy declared himself eligible for the NFL Draft, forgoing his final two years of eligibility. The serious injury he sustained his senior year at Bishop McDevitt was a factor in his decision to enter the draft early. "As a result of a season-ending injury my senior year, I learned a humbling lesson," McCoy said. "Nothing is promised to us and it can all be taken away in a moment."

== Professional career ==
Pre-draft measurables
Height	Weight	Arm length	Hand span	40-yard dash	10-yard split	20-yard split	20-yard shuttle	Three-cone drill	Vertical jump	Broad jump	Bench press
5 ft 10 3/8 in (1.79 m)	198 lb (90 kg)	31 3/4 in (0.81 m)	8 7/8 in (0.23 m)	4.50 s	1.52 s	2.59 s	4.18 s	6.82 s	29.0 in (0.74 m)	8 ft 11 in (2.72 m)	17 reps
All values from Pittsburgh Pro Day, except measurables from NFL Combine

=== Philadelphia Eagles ===
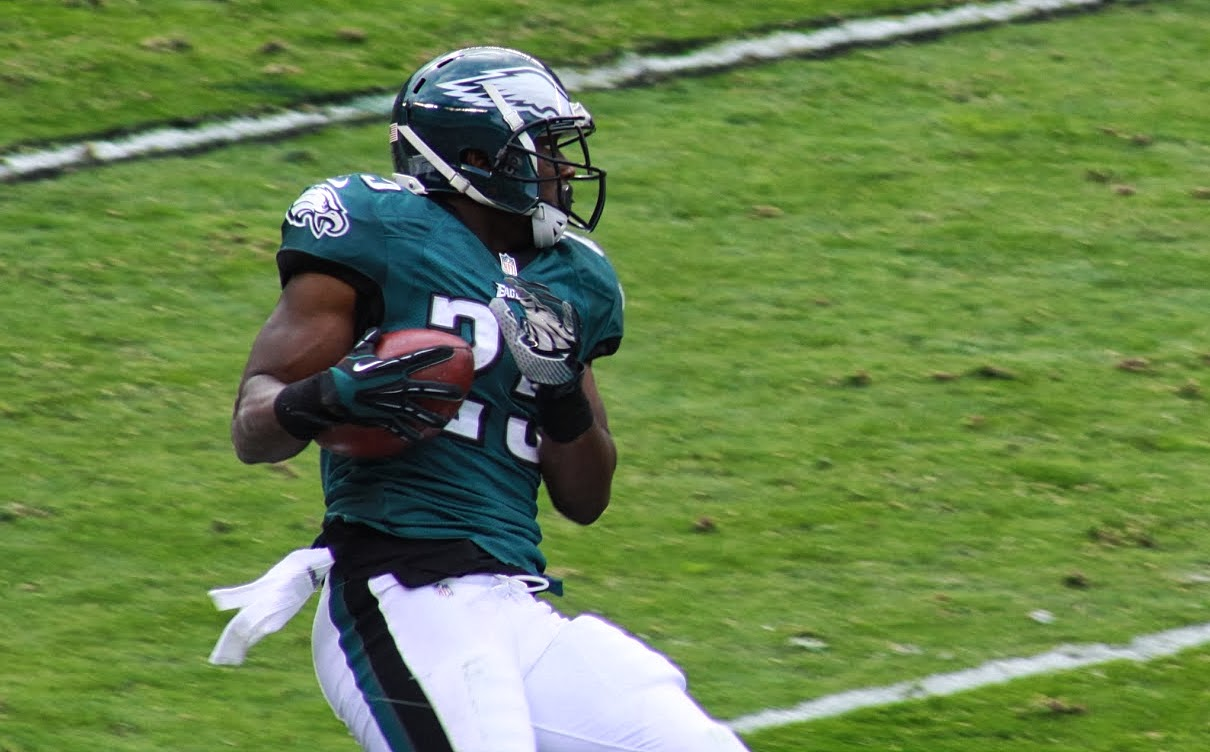
McCoy during a 2013 victory over the Redskins

==== 2009 season ====
McCoy was drafted by the Philadelphia Eagles in the second round with the 53rd overall pick in the 2009 NFL draft. He was the fourth running back to be selected that year. He signed a four-year contract for $3.47 million, including $1.72 million guaranteed, with the team on June 29, 2009.

McCoy was pressed into service as a starter in Week 3 against the Kansas City Chiefs on September 27, 2009, when the Eagles deactivated starter Brian Westbrook due to an ankle injury. He scored his first touchdown in the first quarter of the game on a five-yard rush. McCoy started against the New York Giants on November 1, 2009. He carried the ball eleven times for 82 yards and a touchdown and caught two passes for ten yards. McCoy made his third start for an NBC Sunday Night Football game against the Dallas Cowboys. McCoy rushed 13 times for 54 yards and caught five passes for 61 yards in a 20–16 losing effort. Westbrook sustained a concussion against San Diego and McCoy was called on again to be the starter in a road game against the Chicago Bears on NBC Sunday Night Football. He rushed 20 times for 99 yards and a touchdown, as the Eagles won the game 24–20.

On December 20, 2009, against the San Francisco 49ers, McCoy broke the all-time Eagles rookie rushing record with 606 yards on the year. The record was previously set by Correll Buckhalter with 586 yards in 2001. Also in December, the New York Daily News wrote about the top ten rookies in 2009. McCoy was listed fourth on the list and this was what writer Ralph Vacchiano had to say, "The fact that the Eagles are rolling without Brian Westbrook is, in part, a testament to how good this rookie is." Overall, in the 2009 season, he finished with 637 rushing yards, four rushing touchdowns, and 40 receptions for 308 receiving yards. The Eagles finished with an 11–5 record and made the playoffs. In the Wild Card Round against the Dallas Cowboys, McCoy had five carries for 24 yards in his playoff debut, a 34–14 loss.

==== 2010 season ====
During McCoy's rookie season, he wore the number 29. On March 18, 2010, McCoy changed to number 25, which he had worn at the University of Pittsburgh. Number 25 was previously worn by Lorenzo Booker. Coach Reid had this to say in August, "... He wants it every carry. He’s been running very hard. He’s in great shape, and I think he is ready to roll." McCoy took over the starting running back duties in 2010 after previous starter Brian Westbrook was released in the off-season.

McCoy carried the ball seven times for 35 yards in an early season loss against the Green Bay Packers. He followed this game up with 16 carries for 120 rushing yards and three rushing touchdowns against the Detroit Lions the following week in a winning effort. Head coach Andy Reid had this to say about McCoy after his game against the Lions, "He added more strength in the off-season, really bought into the off-season program, worked his tail off and it's showing up now. He's going out and he's running more physical, he's more deliberate and accurate with his cuts, seeing the daylight and getting North and South, which you have to do in this league..." During a game against the San Francisco 49ers on October 10, McCoy broke a rib and continued to play through the injury, rushing for 92 yards and catching five passes for 47 yards, and helping lead his team to a Week 5 victory. McCoy failed to break the 100-rushing yard barrier again until Sunday November 21 playing the New York Giants. Both the Eagles and Giants headed into this Sunday night contest at Lincoln Financial Field with a 6–3 win–loss record. McCoy ran for 111 yards and scored a touchdown, and caught five passes for 29 yards in the 27–17 win in Week 11. After only receiving 22 carries in the next two games combined, McCoy ran for 149 yards on 16 carries, for an average of 9.3 yards per carry (YPC) against the Dallas Cowboys in Week 14. Overall, in the 2010 season, McCoy finished with 1,080 rushing yards, seven rushing touchdowns, 592 receiving yards, and two receiving touchdowns. The Eagles finished the season 10–6 and won the NFC East Division. In the Wild Card Round of the playoffs, the Eagles faced the Green Bay Packers at Lincoln Financial Field in a rematch of the season opener. They lost to the Green Bay Packers 21–16 after failing to score a touchdown in the first half. McCoy had 46 rushing yards on 12 carries in his second appearance in the NFL playoffs.

ESPN Stats and Information did a special feature on ESPN where they handed out "Next Level Awards" to recognize outstanding play in the 2010 season. McCoy won an award in the "Locked and Loaded" category, which recognized the "best RB facing a loaded box". This is what was said about McCoy, "LeSean McCoy, literally, ran away with this award thanks to some hard-nosed running – an aspect of his game that often is overlooked". ..."Fourteen running backs had at least 30 attempts against a loaded box this season. McCoy finished in the top four in rushing yards (207), touchdowns (three) and attempts per first down (2.8), despite having the fewest carries of those 14 backs (36)."

==== 2011 season ====
The 2011 season started off with McCoy scoring four touchdowns and rushing for 345 yards in his first three games. In addition to that, he also caught nine passes and had one receiving touchdown, for a total of four. After only getting the ball 20 times on the ground in the next two games, and the Eagles dropping their fourth game in a row to the Buffalo Bills, starting the season off 1–4, the Eagles faced two divisional opponents. On the road at FedExField, against the Washington Redskins, McCoy rushed for 126 yards and a touchdown in a 20–13 win. Coming off a bye week, the Eagles faced the Dallas Cowboys on October 30, McCoy scored two touchdowns and rushed for 184 yards; the Eagles won 34–7. McCoy had a rough second half compared to the first. He rushed for over 100 yards twice in the next eight games. He failed to reach the 50-yard mark three times. McCoy saw inconsistency in the run game, some games getting the ball 15 or fewer times. McCoy missed the Eagles final game with a sprained ankle. When McCoy rushed for over 100 yards, the Eagles were 5–1. His 17 rushing touchdowns tied him for third all-time in rushing touchdowns in a single season by a running back aged 23 or younger. The only two running backs ahead of him are Hall of Famers Eric Dickerson and Emmitt Smith. McCoy finished the 2011 season as the league's fourth leading rusher, after sitting out the last game with an ankle injury. During the December 18, 2011, game against the New York Jets, McCoy broke the Eagles' single season touchdown and rushing touchdown records previously set by Steve Van Buren in 1945. As of December 2013, McCoy holds the records with 17 rushing and 20 total touchdowns. He was also voted into the Pro Bowl for his season's performance. McCoy won the FedEx Ground Player of the Year Award, and was also voted Associated Press All-Pro First Team running back. McCoy was the third-youngest player in franchise history to be named as a First Team All-Pro. McCoy finished the 2011 season with 1,309 rushing yards, including six games of over 100 rushing yards. In 15 games played, he recorded a rushing touchdown in 12 of them, and scored a touchdown in 13 out 15. He finished first in the National Football League in rushing touchdowns, with 17, and lead the entire league in total touchdowns with 20.

==== 2012 season ====
On May 17, 2012, it was announced that McCoy had signed a five-year contract extension with the Philadelphia Eagles. The contract is worth $45 million with $20.765 million guaranteed.

On September 9, 2012, the Philadelphia Eagles traveled to Cleveland, Ohio to face the Cleveland Browns. McCoy rushed for 110 yards on 20 carries for an average of 5.5 yards per carry in the season opener. He out-rushed the whole Browns team 110–99 and the Eagles won 17–16. Coming back home to Philadelphia, McCoy scored his first touchdown of the young season, a one-yard run in the first quarter. The Eagles went on to defeat the Baltimore Ravens by a score of 24–23. In Week 4 against NFC East foe New York Giants, McCoy broke the 100-rushing yard barrier for the second time in four games with 123 yards on the ground. In the next five games, McCoy rushed for 321 yards for an average of 64.2 rushing yards per game. All five of those games were losses for the Eagles. On November 18, 2012, playing against the Washington Redskins, McCoy ran for 82 yards and had 20 receiving yards, but suffered a concussion in the fourth quarter of the game. He was injured with less than two minutes remaining in the game. McCoy did not return until December 23 in the second divisional game against the Washington Redskins. In his last two games he had 23 carries for 90 yards. He was used more in the passing offense though, catching 14 passes for a total of 138 receiving yards. He ended up missing four games on the year, playing in a total of 12. Overall, in the 2012 season, he finished with 840 rushing yards, two rushing touchdowns, 373 receiving yards, and three receiving touchdowns.

==== 2013 season ====
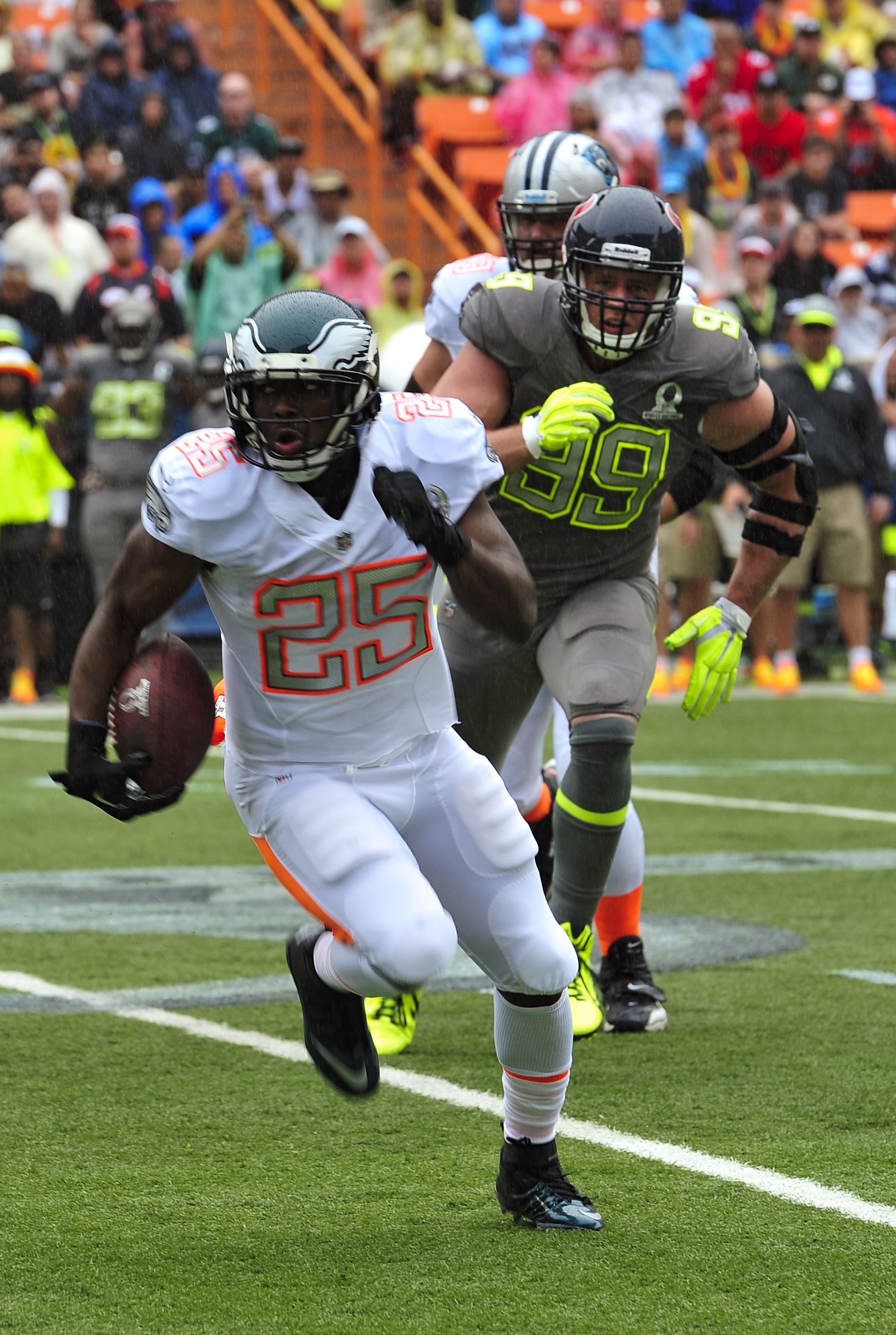
McCoy playing in the 2014 Pro Bowl.

McCoy took the field for Monday Night Football on September 9, 2013, and rushed for 184 yards on 31 carries and scored a touchdown in a victory over the Washington Redskins. His performance was good enough to earn him FedEx Ground Player of the Week honors. McCoy was only handed the ball 11 times in Week 2, resulting in 53 yards. However, he contributed as a wide receiver and caught five passes for 114 yards in the 33–30 loss to the San Diego Chargers. 114 yards currently stands as McCoy's top receiving yards in a game. In the following game, the Eagles faced former head coach Andy Reid and the Kansas City Chiefs in Week 3, on Thursday Night Football. McCoy rushed for 158 yards on 20 attempts, for 7.9 yards per carry. Though the Eagles lost this game and fell to 1–2, McCoy surpassed 150 yards from scrimmage in each of his first three games of the season. Over the course of the next six games, McCoy saw somewhat limited action with varied results. He received more than 20 carries once in a game and broke 100 yards rushing only once. The Eagles dropped back to back games to divisional foes but defeated the Oakland Raiders on November 3, to bring their record to 4–5. McCoy rushed for 155 yards against the Green Bay Packers. This was his third game surpassing 150 yards rushing.

On December 8, 2013, Philadelphia had their first major snowfall of the year, with over 8.5 inches of snow falling. With snow covering the entire field, and with it falling the entire first half, offense was hard to come by. The halftime score was 8–0 in favor of the Detroit Lions. Several minutes into the second half the Lions scored their second touchdown of the game, and subsequently took the lead 14–0. The second half was a breakout half for McCoy, who finished the game with 217 rushing yards on 29 carries. McCoy's 217 rushing broke a franchise record of 207 rushing yards that was previously held by Steve Van Buren. He also scored two touchdowns to help propel the Eagles to victory over the Lions 34–20. McCoy also earned for the second time in 2013, FedEx ground player of the week, in Week 14.

In Week 15, the Eagles traveled to Minnesota. McCoy only had eight rushing attempts, as the Eagles elected to pass for much of the game. He did have 68 receiving yards, which put him over the 100 yards from scrimmage mark. The Eagles fell to the Vikings by a score of 48–30. In Week 16 facing the Chicago Bears, McCoy rushed for 133 yards and scored two touchdowns. This moved him up to second on the Philadelphia Eagles single season rushing yards list. In Week 17 against the Dallas Cowboys, he broke Wilbert Montgomery's Eagles regular season rushing record (1,512 in 1979) and Brian Westbrook's record of most yards from scrimmage (2104 in 2007). McCoy rushed for 131 yards on 27 carries, finishing out the last drive of the game with 23 yards on 6 rushes. The Eagles won 24–22 and earned a playoff spot – the third seed in the NFC at 10–6. McCoy rushed for 77 yards and one touchdown in the Eagles' Wild Card Round game against the 11–5 New Orleans Saints, but the team lost 26–24 after a last-second field goal.

For the 2013 season, McCoy rushed for 1,607 yards and was also the all-purpose yards leader at 2,146.

==== 2014 season ====
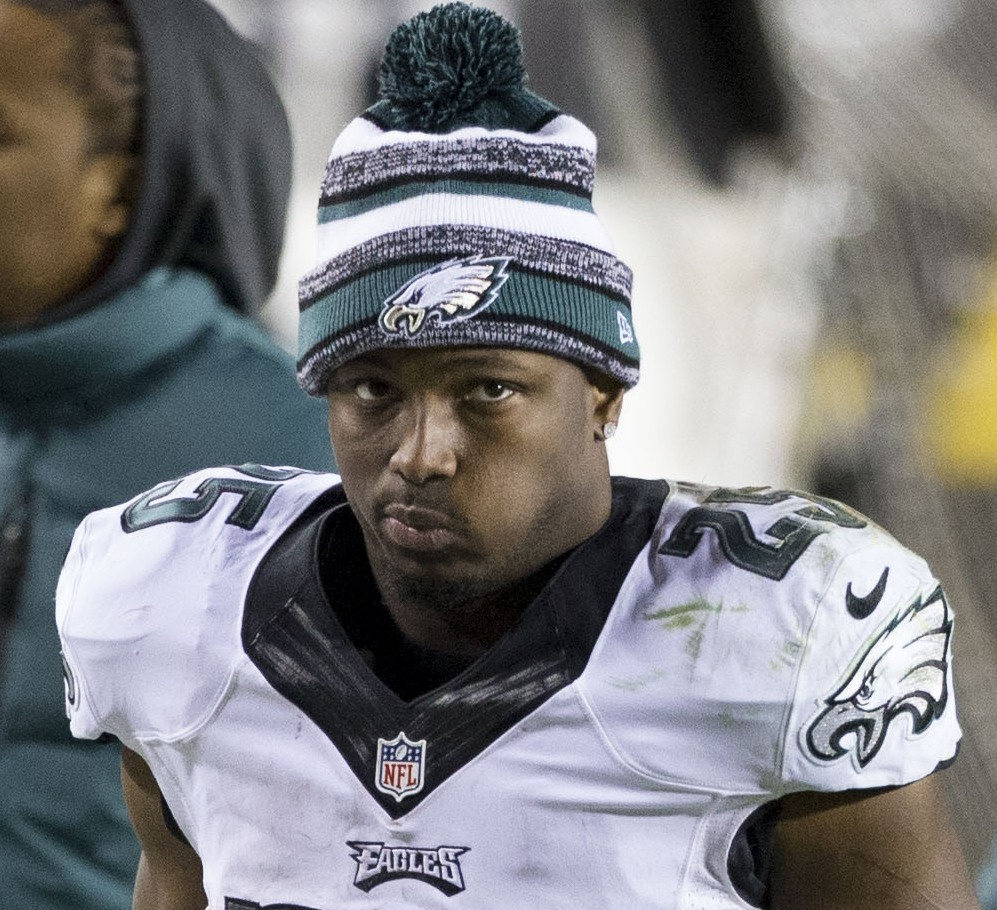
McCoy in December 2014

In the 2014 season, McCoy rushed 312 times for 1,319 yards, which finished third after DeMarco Murray and Le'Veon Bell for the league lead. He recorded four games with at least 100 rushing yards. However, he only totaled five touchdowns, all on the ground. This was in part due to the Eagles signing veteran Darren Sproles, who scored six rushing touchdowns, and Chris Polk being used more for goal-line situations, resulting in four rushing touchdowns for him. The Eagles went 10–6 but missed the postseason His best statistical game was in Week 13 in the 33–10 blowout against the Eagles' divisional rival, the Dallas Cowboys, where he ran 25 times for 159 yards and a touchdown.

McCoy's most notable accomplishment was becoming the Eagles' all-time leading rusher, finishing with 6,792 yards. Wilbert Montgomery, the previous record holder (as well as second and third place Brian Westbrook and Steve Van Buren), had taken eight seasons to compile the yards he had, while McCoy only took six.

=== Buffalo Bills ===
==== 2015 season ====
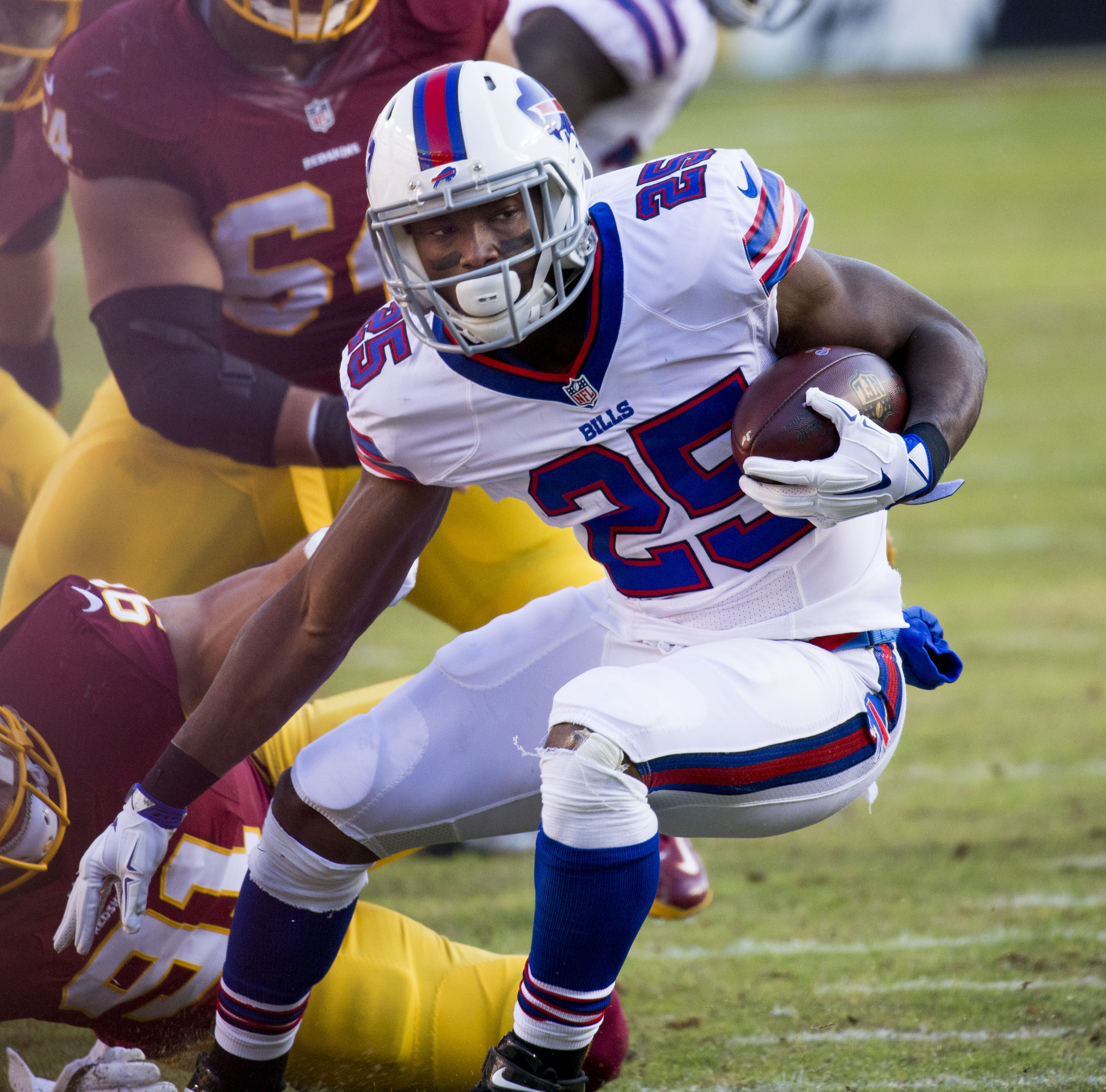
McCoy playing against the Washington Redskins in 2015

On March 10, 2015, the Eagles traded McCoy to the Buffalo Bills in exchange for the linebacker Kiko Alonso. He then signed a new five-year contract worth $40 million. McCoy's offseason was filled with many comments on his former coach, such as how Eagles coach and general manager Chip Kelly "got rid of all the good black players" or that he "doesn't like or respect stars". McCoy got a majority of the work in the backfield, sharing time with Karlos Williams, Anthony Dixon, and Mike Gillislee. McCoy's season started slow, although this could be attributed to a nagging hamstring injury. Although McCoy rushed for 89 yards on 15 carries against the New England Patriots in Week 2, he had a yards per carry average less than 2.5 in games against the Indianapolis Colts and Miami Dolphins . After missing two games with a hamstring injury, McCoy returned to his elite form, rushing for 90 yards on 17 carries against the Cincinnati Bengals in Week 6, gaining his first rushing touchdown of the season. This game started a streak where McCoy gained over 100 yards from scrimmage for seven consecutive weeks, which was ended with a season-ending MCL sprain against the Washington Redskins, his longtime divisional rival while he was with the Eagles. In December, as the Bills prepared to face the Eagles in Philadelphia, McCoy said he would not shake Chip Kelly's hand, his former coach and the man who traded him. Although he kissed the Eagles logo on Lincoln Financial Field and hugged owner Jeffrey Lurie, he did not participate in postgame ceremonies when the Bills lost. He finished the 2015 season with 203 carries for 895 rushing yards and three rushing touchdowns to go along with 32 receptions for 292 receiving yards and two receiving touchdowns in 12 games. He was ranked 69th on the NFL Top 100 Players of 2016.

==== 2016 season ====
In the Bills' regular season opener, McCoy ran for 58 yards on 16 carries and scored one touchdown as the Bills lost to the Baltimore Ravens by a score of 13–7. On September 25, he had 17 carries for 110 rushing yards and two rushing touchdowns against the Arizona Cardinals in Week 3. During a Week 5 30–19 victory over the Los Angeles Rams, he had 18 carries for 150 yards, marking the most he had in a single game since joining the Bills. On October 16, McCoy had 19 carries for 140 rushing yards and tied his single game career-high of three rushing touchdowns as the Bills defeated the San Francisco 49ers and McCoy's former head coach Chip Kelly by a score of 45–16 in Week 6. In Week 12, McCoy had 19 carries for 103 rushing yards and two rushing touchdowns in the 28–21 victory over the Jacksonville Jaguars. In Week 15, against the Cleveland Browns, he had 19 carries for 153 rushing yards and two rushing touchdowns in the 33–13 victory. McCoy was named to his fifth career Pro Bowl on December 20. He finished the 2016 season with 1,267 rushing yards on 234 carries and had 13 rushing touchdowns as the Bills went 7–9 and missed the postseason. In addition, he had 50 catches for 356 receiving yards and one receiving touchdown. McCoy's 1,267 rushing yards were the most by a Bills running back since Travis Henry in 2003 and his 13 rushing touchdowns tied for the second-most in franchise history. He was ranked 27th by his peers on the NFL Top 100 Players of 2017. Along with quarterback Tyrod Taylor and backup running back Mike Gillislee, McCoy helped Buffalo lead the NFL in rushing yards for the second consecutive year.

==== 2017 season ====
In the Bills' regular season opener, McCoy had 159 yards from scrimmage in a 21–12 win over the New York Jets. In this game, McCoy eclipsed 12,000 scrimmage yards for his career. He became the sixth active player to reach the mark and one of 60 players to ever reach 12,000 yards from scrimmage. Despite struggling early in the season in new offensive coordinator Rick Dennison's offense, McCoy had strong games against the Tampa Bay Buccaneers, Oakland Raiders, and the Los Angeles Chargers in Weeks 7, 8, and 11. During Week 14 against the Indianapolis Colts in blizzard-like conditions, McCoy had a career-high 32 carries for 156 yards and the game-winning touchdown in overtime, allowing the Bills to win 13–7. The performance against the Colts put McCoy over 1,000 rushing yards for the season.

On December 17, in a Week 15 game against the Miami Dolphins, he became the 30th NFL player to exceed 10,000 rushing yards. On the play that took him over the 10,000 yard mark he was tackled by Kiko Alonso, who was the player in the 1-for-1 trade that brought McCoy to the Bills. On December 19, McCoy was named to his sixth Pro Bowl. The Bills finished the regular season with a 9–7 record and made the playoffs as the #6-seed. In the Wild Card Round against the Jacksonville Jaguars, he finished with 19 carries for 75 rushing yards and six receptions for 44 receiving yards as the Bills lost by a score of 10–3. McCoy finished the 2017 season with 1,138 yards and six touchdowns on 287 rushing attempts in addition to 448 receiving yards, two receiving touchdowns and 59 catches. He was ranked 30th by his fellow players on the NFL Top 100 Players of 2018.

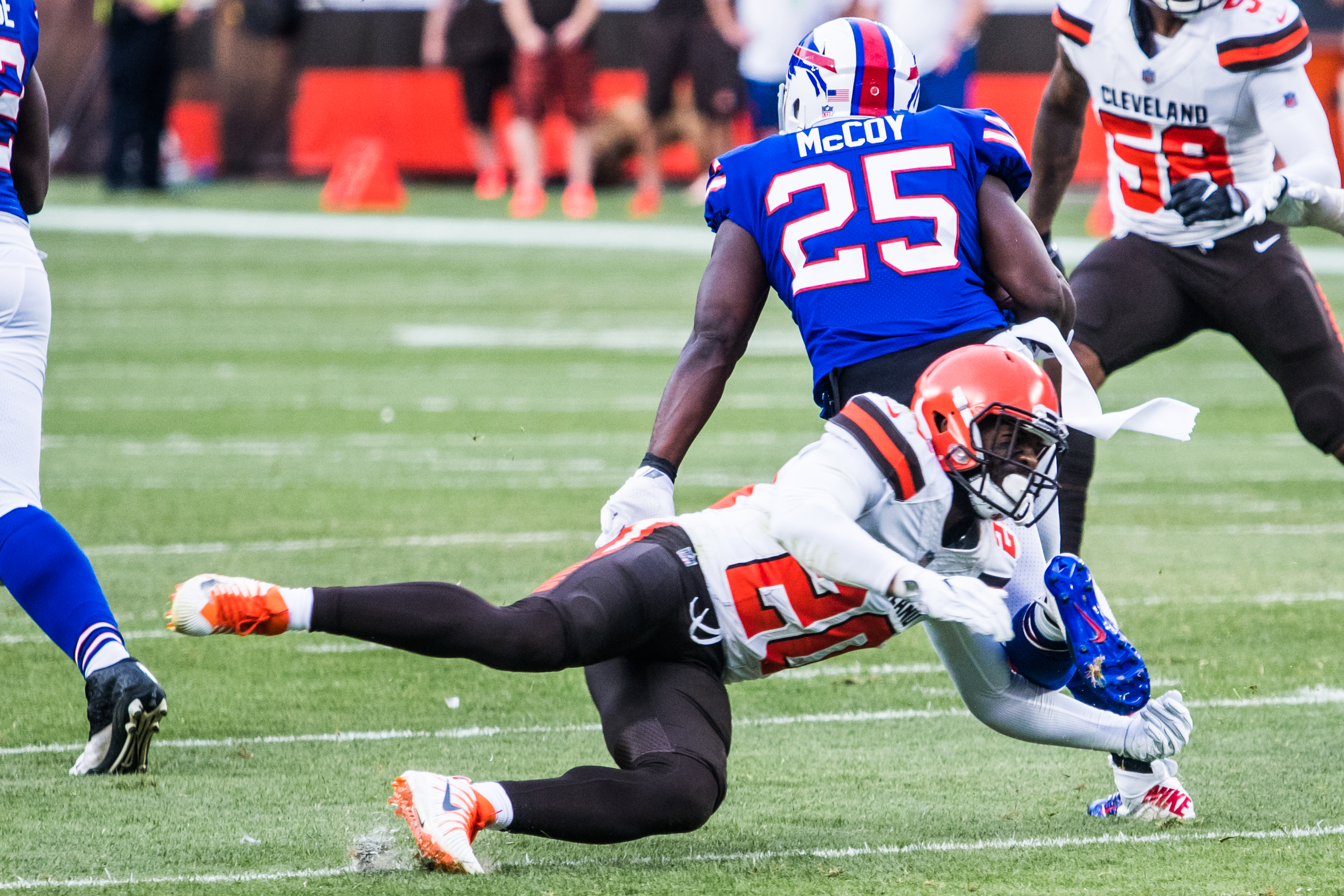
McCoy eludes a tackle during the 2018 preaseason

==== 2018 season ====
Despite a chaotic offseason for McCoy personally, the Bills named him a team captain for the 2018 season. Early in the season, McCoy struggled along with the team partly due to an overall inexperienced offensive unit and injuries. In the first nine games, McCoy totaled 85 carries for 267 rushing yards and 23 receptions for 186 receiving yards as the Bills went 2–7. In Week 10, against the New York Jets, McCoy had his best performance of the season with 26 carries for 113 rushing yards and two rushing touchdowns in the 41–10 victory. McCoy finished the season with just 514 rushing yards, three touchdowns, and 3.2 yards per carry, all career lows. However, following the season's conclusion, Bills general manager Brandon Beane remained confident in McCoy, announcing intentions to keep him on the team through the end of his contract.

McCoy was released during final roster cuts on August 31, 2019.

=== Kansas City Chiefs ===
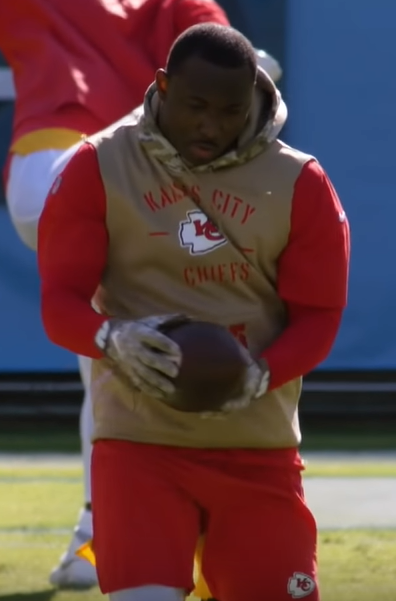
LeSean McCoy in 2019

McCoy signed a one-year, $3 million contract, with a potential $1 million in incentives, with the Kansas City Chiefs on August 31, 2019, reuniting with his former Eagles head coach Andy Reid and former Bills teammate Sammy Watkins. Playing in Week 1, McCoy rushed for 81 yards on ten carries in the 40–26 victory over the Jacksonville Jaguars, while catching one pass for 12 yards. In Week 3 against the Baltimore Ravens, McCoy rushed eight times for 54 yards and a rushing touchdown and caught three passes for 26 yards and a receiving touchdown as the Chiefs won 33–28. McCoy was sporadically used by the Chiefs throughout the season as a change-of-pace back behind Damien Williams and Darrel Williams, often receiving games off for "load management" by Reid due to McCoy's age. He finished the regular season with 101 carries for 465 rushing yards and four rushing touchdowns to go along with 28 receptions for 181 receiving yards and a receiving touchdown. He was ultimately made inactive for much of the postseason, playing just one snap in the Divisional Round win over the Houston Texans, as the Chiefs went on to win Super Bowl LIV over the San Francisco 49ers, giving McCoy his first Super Bowl ring.

McCoy finished the 2010s decade having gained the most rushing yards in the NFL during the decade with 10,434 yards.

=== Tampa Bay Buccaneers ===
McCoy signed with the Tampa Bay Buccaneers on August 4, 2020. He made his Buccaneers debut in the team's regular season opener September 13, a 34-23 loss against the New Orleans Saints. Overall, McCoy had a very limited role due to depth of the backfield unit, which contained Ronald Jones II, Leonard Fournette, and Ke'Shawn Vaughn. He totaled ten carries for 31 rushing yards and 15 receptions for 101 receiving yards in ten games. He won his second Super Bowl—ironically against Kansas City, his former team—but did not play in the game. He became the fourth player in NFL history to win consecutive Super Bowls with the second Super Bowl being won over his previous team.

=== Retirement ===
On October 1, 2021, McCoy announced his retirement after signing a ceremonial contract with the Eagles. McCoy retired with exactly 15,000 yards from scrimmage for his career.

=== Playing style ===
Categorized as a "scat back", McCoy was known for his elusiveness and ability to "cut on a dime" and abruptly change directions, often running in an "east-west" manner similar to other elusive backs such as Hall of Famer Barry Sanders, whom he cited as his favorite player growing up. McCoy's shiftiness allowed him to largely avoid the constant hits suffered by "power backs" who run directly into contact, prolonging his longevity in the league.

== Career statistics ==
=== NFL ===
Legend
	Won the Super Bowl
	Led the league
**Bold**	Career high

==== Regular season ====
Year	Team	Games		Rushing					Receiving					Fumbles	
Year	Team	GP	GS	Att	Yds	Avg	Lng	TD	Rec	Yds	Avg	Lng	TD	Fum	Lost
2009	PHI	**16**	4	155	637	4.1	66T	4	40	308	7.7	45	0	2	1
2010	PHI	15	13	207	1,080	5.2	62	7	**78**	**592**	7.6	40	2	2	1
2011	PHI	15	15	273	1,309	4.8	60	**17**	48	315	6.6	26	**3**	1	1
2012	PHI	12	12	200	840	4.2	34	2	54	373	6.9	36	**3**	**4**	**3**
2013	PHI	**16**	**16**	**314**	**1,607**	5.1	57T	9	52	539	**10.4**	**70**	2	1	1
2014	PHI	**16**	**16**	312	1,319	4.2	53	5	28	155	5.5	18	0	**4**	**3**
2015	BUF	12	12	203	895	4.4	48T	3	32	292	9.1	22	2	2	1
2016	BUF	15	15	234	1,267	**5.4**	**75T**	13	50	356	7.1	41	1	3	0
2017	BUF	**16**	**16**	287	1,138	4.0	48T	6	59	448	7.6	39	2	3	1
2018	BUF	14	13	161	514	3.2	28T	3	34	238	7.0	24	0	0	0
2019	KC	13	9	101	465	4.6	39	4	28	181	6.5	23	1	3	2
2020	TB	10	0	10	31	3.1	14	0	15	101	6.7	15	0	0	0
Career		170	141	2,457	11,102	4.5	75T	73	518	3,898	7.5	70	16	25	14

==== Postseason ====
Year	Team	Games		Rushing					Receiving					Fumbles	
Year	Team	GP	GS	Att	Yds	Avg	Lng	TD	Rec	Yds	Avg	Lng	TD	Fum	Lost
2009	PHI	1	0	5	24	4.8	14	0	1	9	9.0	9	0	0	0
2010	PHI	1	1	12	46	3.8	9	0	4	36	9.0	16	0	1	0
2013	PHI	1	1	21	77	3.7	11	1	4	15	3.8	7	0	0	0
2017	BUF	1	1	19	75	3.9	25	0	6	44	7.3	16	0	0	0
2019	KC	1	0	—	—	—	—	—	—	—	—	—	—	0	0
2020	TB	2	0	—	—	—	—	—	—	—	—	—	—	0	0
Career		7	3	57	222	3.9	25	1	15	104	6.9	16	0	1	0

=== College ===
Season	Team	GP	Rushing				Receiving			
Season	Team	GP	Att	Yds	Avg	TD	Rec	Yds	Avg	TD
2007	Pittsburgh	12	276	1,328	4.8	14	33	244	7.4	1
2008	Pittsburgh	13	308	1,488	4.8	21	32	305	9.5	0
Career		25	584	2,816	4.8	35	65	589	8.5	1

=== High school ===
**Year**	**Games**	**Attempts**	**Yards**	**TD**
2002	6	60	376	2
2003	10	272	2,561	28
2004	13	342	2,828	31
2005	4	83	889	10
**Career**	**33**	**757**	**6,654**	**71**

== Career highlights ==
=== Awards and honors ===
NFL

- 2× Super Bowl champion (LIV, LV)
- 2× First-team All-Pro (2011, 2013)
- 6× Pro Bowl (2011, 2013–2017)
- NFL rushing yards leader (2013)
- NFL rushing touchdowns leader (2011)
- 2× FedEx Ground Player of the Year (2011, 2013)
- Philadelphia Eagles Hall of Fame
- NFL 2010s All-Decade Team
- 7× NFL Top 100 — 18th (2012), 45th (2013), 5th (2014), 29th (2015), 69th (2016), 27th (2017), 30th (2018)

College

- Second-team All-American (2008)
- Big East Rookie of the Year (2007)
- 2× First-team All-Big East (2007, 2008)

=== Eagles franchise records ===
- Most rushing yards, career (6,792)
- Most rushing touchdowns, single season (17) (2011)
- Total touchdowns, single season (20) (2011)

== Media career and other ventures ==
In August 2012, McCoy became a partner and investor in premium sports drink Bodyarmor SuperDrink.

On November 28, 2012, McCoy was featured in an episode of E:60 titled "The Real McCoy". The interview was done by ESPN reporter Lisa Salters. It details the story of McCoy's high school career and his ankle injury.

In September 2024, McCoy became a panelist on The Facility, a sports talk show on Fox Sports 1 (FS1).

In November 2025, McCoy made it to the final round of the trivia game show Celebrity Weakest Link during their "Football Legends" episode.

== Personal life ==
McCoy's brother, LeRon McCoy, is a former wide receiver who played for the Arizona Cardinals. McCoy has one son, and one daughter.

McCoy has been a resident of the Marlton section of Evesham Township, New Jersey. Following his trade from the Eagles to the Bills, reports surfaced that McCoy was initially unwilling to leave Philadelphia for Buffalo, but gradually came to love his new city and its fans. He wrote a letter of appreciation to Bills fans on The Players' Tribune after witnessing their unwavering support, especially after the Bills ended a 17-year playoff drought.

In May 2013, McCoy was sued for his alleged actions towards a woman using the alias "Mary Roe" aboard a party bus on the New Jersey Turnpike. Roe testified that McCoy humiliated her and 15 other women by spraying them with a beverage before ejecting Roe from the vehicle. McCoy's attorney Andrew Smith Esq. responded, "There are no criminal charges pending and no probable cause was ever found," stating that the accuser was simply attempting to collect money from McCoy. Roe sued for over $50,000 in damages for assault and battery, intentional infliction of emotional distress, false imprisonment and negligence.

In 2017, McCoy opined that Colin Kaepernick, known for starting the 2016 U.S. national anthem protests, "was not worth the distraction" when asked why the latter was not on an NFL roster that year. However, in light of President Donald Trump's comments that NFL players who kneel during the anthem "should be fired", McCoy took part in the protests by continuing to stretch during the anthem before a September 24 game. McCoy defended the participation of his teammates and himself in the protests, saying that while the national anthem and flag "meant a lot" to himself and his teammates, he could not "stand and support something when the leader of this country is acting like a jerk." The Bills as a whole had met together before the game to discuss how they would respond to President Trump's statement.

On July 10, 2018, a post on Instagram alleged that McCoy battered a woman, along with accusations that McCoy beat his son, his pet dog, and that he also used illegal steroids. The post was soon deleted and McCoy denied all of the allegations made in a statement stating he had "not had any direct contact with any of the people involved in months." In response, the Buffalo Bills issued a statement via Twitter stating, "We have spoken to LeSean McCoy and have been in contact with the National Football League. We will continue to gather information."

In April 2019, McCoy tweeted a spoiler about the film Avengers: Endgame shortly after watching the film, specifically the way the film ended, angering his followers and Marvel fans to the point that some blocked him and even called for the termination of his contract with the Buffalo Bills or for him to get injured. McCoy later called this the "worst decision" of his life in an interview with Good Morning Football.
