= 2009–10 NFL playoffs =

American football tournament

- Dates: January 9–February 7, 2010
- Season: 2009
- Teams: 12
- Games played: 11
- Super Bowl XLIV site: Sun Life Stadium; Miami Gardens, Florida
- Defending champions: Pittsburgh Steelers (did not qualify)
- Champion: New Orleans Saints (1st title)
- Runner-up: Indianapolis Colts
- Conference runners-up: Minnesota Vikings; New York Jets
NFL playoffs
← 2008–09	2010–11 →

The National Football League playoffs for the 2009 season began on January 9, 2010. The postseason tournament concluded with the New Orleans Saints defeating the Indianapolis Colts in Super Bowl XLIV, 31–17, on February 7, at Sun Life Stadium in Miami Gardens, Florida.

The Wild Card round featured three games that were re-matches of Week 17 games.

== Participants ==
Within each conference, the four division winners and the top two non-division winners with the best overall regular season records) qualified for the playoffs. The four division winners are seeded 1–4 based on their overall won-lost-tied record, and the wild card teams are seeded 5–6. The NFL does not use a fixed bracket playoff system, and there are no restrictions regarding teams from the same division matching up in any round. In the first round, dubbed the wild-card playoffs or wild-card weekend, the third-seeded division winner hosts the sixth-seed wild card, and the fourth seed hosts the fifth. The 1 and 2 seeds from each conference received a first-round bye. In the second round, the divisional playoffs, the number 1 seed hosts the worst-surviving seed from the first round (seed 4, 5, or 6), while the number 2 seed will play the other team (seed 3, 4, or 5). The two surviving teams from each conference's divisional playoff games met in the respective AFC and NFC Conference Championship games, hosted by the higher seed. Although the Super Bowl, the championship round of the playoffs, is played at a neutral site, the designated home team is based on an annual rotation by conference.

Playoff seeds
Seed	AFC	NFC
1	Indianapolis Colts (South winner)	New Orleans Saints (South winner)
2	San Diego Chargers (West winner)	Minnesota Vikings (North winner)
3	New England Patriots (East winner)	Dallas Cowboys (East winner)
4	Cincinnati Bengals (North winner)	Arizona Cardinals (West winner)
5	New York Jets (wild card)	Green Bay Packers (wild card)
6	Baltimore Ravens (wild card)	Philadelphia Eagles (wild card)

== Bracket ==
Jan 9 – Cowboys Stadium	Jan 17 – Hubert H. Humphrey Metrodome
6	Philadelphia	14
3	Dallas	3
3	Dallas	34	Jan 24 – Louisiana Superdome
2	Minnesota	34
NFC
Jan 10 – University of Phoenix Stadium	2	Minnesota	28
Jan 16 – Louisiana Superdome
1	New Orleans	31*
5	Green Bay	45	NFC Championship
4	Arizona	14
4	Arizona	51*	Feb 7 – Sun Life Stadium
1	New Orleans	45
Wild-card round
Divisional round
Jan 9 – Paul Brown Stadium	N1	New Orleans	31
Jan 17 – Qualcomm Stadium
A1	Indianapolis	17
5	NY Jets	24	Super Bowl XLIV
5	NY Jets	17
4	Cincinnati	14	Jan 24 – Lucas Oil Stadium
2	San Diego	14
AFC
Jan 10 – Gillette Stadium	5	NY Jets	17
Jan 16 – Lucas Oil Stadium
1	Indianapolis	30
6	Baltimore	33	AFC Championship
6	Baltimore	3
3	New England	14
1	Indianapolis	20

* Indicates overtime victory

== Schedule ==
In the United States, NBC broadcast the first two Wild Card playoff games. Fox then televised the rest of the NFC games. CBS broadcast the rest of the AFC playoff games and Super Bowl XLIV.

Round	Away team	Score	Home team	Date	Kickoff (ET / UTC–5)	TV
Wild-card round	New York Jets	24–14	Cincinnati Bengals	January 9, 2010	4:30 p.m.	NBC
Wild-card round	Philadelphia Eagles	14–34	Dallas Cowboys	January 9, 2010	8:00 p.m.	NBC
Wild-card round	Baltimore Ravens	33–14	New England Patriots	January 10, 2010	1:00 p.m.	CBS
Wild-card round	Green Bay Packers	45–51 (OT)	Arizona Cardinals	January 10, 2010	4:30 p.m.	Fox
Divisional round	Arizona Cardinals	14–45	New Orleans Saints	January 16, 2010	4:30 p.m.	Fox
Divisional round	Baltimore Ravens	3–20	Indianapolis Colts	January 16, 2010	8:00 p.m.	CBS
Divisional round	Dallas Cowboys	3–34	Minnesota Vikings	January 17, 2010	1:00 p.m.	Fox
Divisional round	New York Jets	17–14	San Diego Chargers	January 17, 2010	4:30 p.m.	CBS
Conference championships	New York Jets	17–30	Indianapolis Colts	January 24, 2010	3:00 p.m.	CBS
Conference championships	Minnesota Vikings	28–31 (OT)	New Orleans Saints	January 24, 2010	6:30 p.m.	Fox
Super Bowl XLIV Sun Life Stadium Miami Gardens, Florida	New Orleans Saints	31–17	Indianapolis Colts	February 7, 2010	6:30 p.m.	CBS

== Wild-card round ==
=== Saturday, January 9, 2010 ===
==== AFC: New York Jets 24, Cincinnati Bengals 14 ====
New York Jets vs. Cincinnati Bengals – Game summary

Quarter	1	2	3	4	Total
Jets	0	14	7	3	24
Bengals	7	0	0	7	14

at Paul Brown Stadium, Cincinnati, Ohio

- Game time: 4:30 p.m. EST
- Game weather: Cloudy, 21 °F (−6 °C)
- Game attendance: 63,686
- Referee: Bill Leavy (127)
- TV announcers (NBC): Tom Hammond (play-by-play), Joe Theismann, Joe Gibbs (color commentators), and Tiki Barber (sideline reporter)
- Recap, Game Book

Game information

First quarter

- CIN – Laveranues Coles 11-yard pass from Carson Palmer (Shayne Graham kick), 7:07. Bengals 7–0. Drive: 7 plays, 45 yards, 3:03.

Second quarter

- NYJ – Shonn Greene 39-yard run (Jay Feely kick), 11:52. Tied 7–7. Drive: 2 plays, 47 yards, 0:49.
- NYJ – Dustin Keller 45-yard pass from Mark Sanchez (Jay Feely kick), 6:19. Jets 14–7. Drive: 4 plays, 57 yards, 2:07.

Third quarter

- NYJ – Thomas Jones 9-yard run (Jay Feely kick), 2:18. Jets 21–7. Drive: 8 plays, 75 yards, 4:06.

Fourth quarter

- CIN – Cedric Benson 47-yard run (Shayne Graham kick), 11:04. Jets 21–14. Drive: 2 plays, 56 yards, 0:52.
- NYJ – Jay Feely 20-yard field goal, 5:47. Jets 24–14. Drive: 8 plays, 66 yards, 5:17.

Top passers

- NYJ – Mark Sanchez – 12/15, 182 yards, TD
- CIN – Carson Palmer – 18/36, 146 yards, TD, INT

Top rushers

- NYJ – Shonn Greene – 21 rushes, 135 yards, TD
- CIN – Cedric Benson – 21 rushes, 169 yards, TD

Top receivers

- NYJ – Dustin Keller – 3 receptions, 99 yards, TD
- CIN – Laveranues Coles – 6 receptions, 48 yards, TD

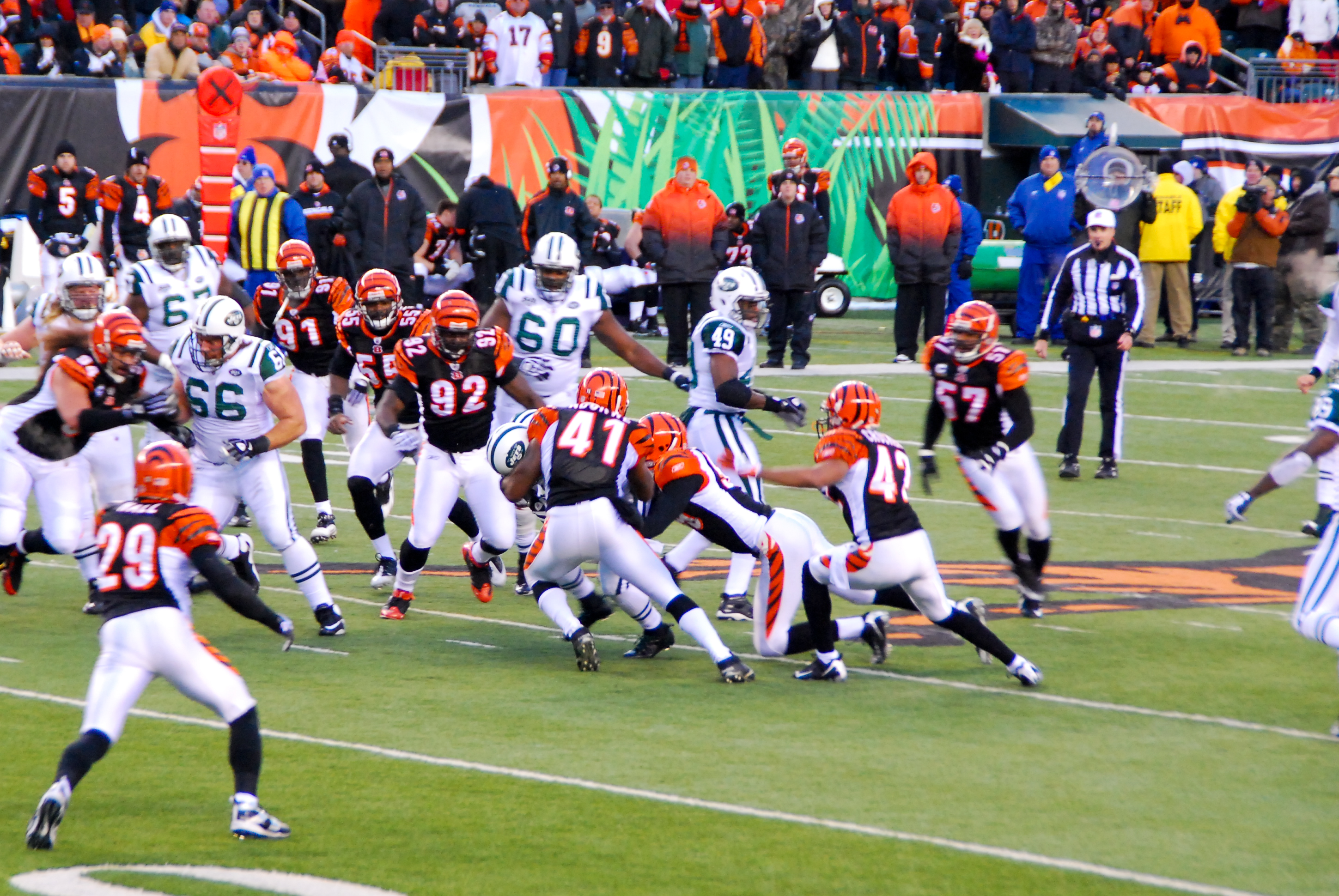
The Bengals on defense against the Jets in the wild card game

Rookie quarterback Mark Sanchez completed 12 of 15 passes for 181 yards and a touchdown while rookie running back Shonn Greene rushed for 135 yards as New York followed up their 37–0 win over the Bengals in the last week of the regular season with a 24–14 victory.

Bengals rookie Bernard Scott started off the game with a 56-yard kickoff return to the Jets 36-yard line. But two plays later, receiver Laveranues Coles lost a fumble while being tackled by Bryan Thomas. New York was forced to punt on their ensuing drive, and Rico Murray gave the Bengals good field position with a 23-yard return to the New York 45. This time Cincinnati was able to take advantage of their scoring opportunity, driving 45 yards in seven plays and finishing it with Carson Palmer's 11-yard touchdown pass to Coles.

But in the second quarter, the Jets began to take control of the game. First an 11-yard punt return by Jerricho Cotchery to the Bengals 47-yard line set up a touchdown on a 39-yard burst from Greene. Then New York defensive back Darrelle Revis intercepted a pass from Palmer and returned it 21 yards to the Jets 43-yard line. Two plays later, Sanchez converted a 3rd-and-12 with a 14-yard completion to Cotchery, and followed it up with a 41-yard scoring strike to tight end Dustin Keller.

On their first drive of the second half, Cincinnati drove from their own 12 to the Jets 17-yard line, featuring a 27-yard run by Cedric Benson. But they failed to score as Palmer's pass on third down was incomplete and Shayne Graham missed a 35-yard field goal attempt. Following the missed field goal, New York drove 75 yards in eight plays, with Sanchez completing an 18-yard pass to Cotchery and a 16-yarder to Braylon Edwards before Thomas Jones finished the drive with a 9-yard touchdown run, increasing their lead to 21–7.

Early in the fourth quarter, Benson took off for a 47-yard touchdown run to make it 21–14. But the Jets responded on their ensuing drive, with Sanchez's 43-yard completion to Keller setting up a 20-yard field goal by Jay Feely to put them back up by a two score margin. The Bengals managed one last attempt to get back in the game with a drive to the New York 11-yard line. But Graham missed another field goal, this one from 28 yards, with 3:43 left in regulation.

Benson finished the game with a franchise record 169 rushing yards. The loss for the Bengals gave them their 19th consecutive season without a playoff win, the longest streak among all 32 NFL teams. Sanchez became only the fourth rookie quarterback to win his first playoff game, following Shaun King, Ben Roethlisberger and Joe Flacco.

This was the second postseason meeting between the Jets and Bengals, with New York winning the only prior meeting 44–17 in the 1982 AFC first round playoffs.

==== NFC: Dallas Cowboys 34, Philadelphia Eagles 14 ====
Philadelphia Eagles vs. Dallas Cowboys – Game summary

Quarter	1	2	3	4	Total
Eagles	0	7	0	7	14
Cowboys	0	27	7	0	34

at Cowboys Stadium, Arlington, Texas

- Game time: 8:00 p.m. EST/7:00 p.m. CST
- Game weather: None (retractable roof closed)
- Game attendance: 92,951
- Referee: Ed Hochuli (85)
- TV announcers (NBC): Al Michaels (play-by-play), Cris Collinsworth (color commentator), and Andrea Kremer (sideline reporter)
- Recap, Game Book

Game information

First quarter

- No scoring plays.

Second quarter

- DAL – John Phillips 1-yard pass from Tony Romo (Shaun Suisham kick), 14:09. Cowboys 7–0. Drive: 4 plays, 55 yards, 2:16.
- PHI – Jeremy Maclin 76-yard pass from Michael Vick (David Akers kick), 13:19. Tied 7–7. Drive: 2 plays, 83 yards, 0:50.
- DAL – Tashard Choice 1-yard run (Shaun Suisham kick), 9:14. Cowboys 14–7. Drive: 10 plays, 85 yards, 4:05.
- DAL – Shaun Suisham 25-yard field goal, 3:39. Cowboys 17–7. Drive: 8 plays, 51 yards, 3:56.
- DAL – Miles Austin 6-yard pass from Tony Romo (Shaun Suisham kick), 1:55. Cowboys 24–7. Drive: 3 plays, 18 yards, 1:28.
- DAL – Shaun Suisham 48-yard field goal, 0:02. Cowboys 27–7. Drive: 7 plays, 28 yards, 0:49.

Third quarter

- DAL – Felix Jones 73-yard run (Shaun Suisham kick), 5:33. Cowboys 34–7. Drive: 4 plays, 89 yards, 2:22.

Fourth quarter

- PHI – DeSean Jackson 4-yard pass from Donovan McNabb (David Akers kick), 13:30. Cowboys 34–14. Drive: 9 plays, 89 yards, 3:23.

Top passers

- PHI – Donovan McNabb – 19/37, 230 yards, TD
- DAL – Tony Romo – 23/35, 244 yards, 2 TD

Top rushers

- PHI – LeSean McCoy – 21 rushes, 135 yards
- DAL – Felix Jones – 16 rushes, 148 yards, TD

Top receivers

- PHI – Jeremy Maclin – 7 receptions, 146 yards, TD
- DAL – Miles Austin – 7 receptions, 82 yards, TD

Playing in the first playoff game in Cowboys Stadium, in front of a crowd of 92,951, the largest to attend an NFL postseason game other than the Super Bowl, Dallas racked up 426 yards and forced four turnovers en route to their first playoff win since 1996, while handing the Eagles their first one-and-done playoff run since that same year. Cowboys quarterback Tony Romo threw for 244 yards and 2 touchdowns, while running back Felix Jones rushed for 148 yards, including a 73-yard touchdown run in the second half to put the game away.

After a scoreless first quarter, a 40-yard pass interference penalty on Eagles defensive back Sheldon Brown in the end zone set up Romo's 1-yard touchdown pass to tight end John Phillips. Philadelphia quickly responded with a 76-yard touchdown pass from Michael Vick to Jeremy Maclin on the second play of their ensuing drive. But the Cowboys struck back with an 85-yard scoring drive, featuring 18-yard receptions by Jason Witten and Patrick Crayton, along with a key replay challenge that overturned an Eagles interception. Tashard Choice capped off the drive with a 1-yard touchdown run to give Dallas a 14–7 lead.

Philadelphia was forced to punt on their next drive, and Crayton returned the punt 31 yards to his own 41-yard line. On the next play, Romo's 36-yard completion to Miles Austin moved the ball to the Eagles 23, eventually leading to a Shaun Suisham field goal to make the score 17–7. Just 33 seconds later, the Cowboys increased their lead to 24–7 with Romo's 6-yard touchdown pass to Austin after linebacker Bobby Carpenter recovered a fumbled handoff from Vick on the Philadelphia 18-yard line. Then with time running out in the half, Cowboys linebacker Bradie James forced and recovered a fumble from fullback Leonard Weaver on the Eagles 42-yard line, setting up Suisham's second field goal to give Dallas a 27–7 halftime lead.

In the second half, Jones' 73-yard touchdown run capped off Dallas' scoring for the day. Meanwhile, the Cowboys defense held the Eagles in check the rest of the game, forcing two turnovers on downs, another fumble and an interception, while only allowing a meaningless touchdown on a 6-yard pass from Donovan McNabb to DeSean Jackson in the fourth quarter, making the final score 34–14.

This would be McNabb's final game in an Eagles uniform.

This was the fourth postseason meeting between the Eagles and Cowboys, with Dallas having won two of the previous three games, including the most recent 30–11 in the 1995 NFC Divisional playoffs.

=== Sunday, January 10, 2010 ===
==== AFC: Baltimore Ravens 33, New England Patriots 14 ====
Baltimore Ravens vs. New England Patriots – Game summary

Quarter	1	2	3	4	Total
Ravens	24	0	3	6	33
Patriots	0	7	7	0	14

at Gillette Stadium, Foxborough, Massachusetts

- Game time: 1:00 p.m. EST
- Game weather: Sunny and cold, 20 °F (−7 °C)
- Game attendance: 68,756
- Referee: Gene Steratore (114)
- TV announcers (CBS): Jim Nantz (play-by-play) and Phil Simms (color commentator)
- Recap, Game Book

Game information

First quarter

- BAL – Ray Rice 83-yard run (Billy Cundiff kick), 14:43. Ravens 7–0. Drive: 1 play, 83 yards, 0:17.
- BAL – Le'Ron McClain 1-yard run (Billy Cundiff kick) 10:29. Ravens 14–0. Drive: 5 plays, 17 yards, 2:44.
- BAL – Ray Rice 1-yard run (Billy Cundiff kick) 3:55. Ravens 21–0. Drive: 6 plays, 25 yards, 2:54.
- BAL – Billy Cundiff 27-yard field goal, 1:19. Ravens 24–0. Drive: 4 plays, 0 yards, 1:37.

Second quarter

- NE – Julian Edelman 6-yard pass from Tom Brady (Stephen Gostkowski kick), 11:23. Ravens 24–7. Drive: 6 plays, 16 yards, 2:45.

Third quarter

- BAL – Billy Cundiff 23-yard field goal, 6:18. Ravens 27–7. Drive: 6 plays, 18 yards, 3:31.
- NE – Julian Edelman 1-yard pass from Tom Brady (Stephen Gostkowski kick), 1:47. Ravens 27–14. Drive: 10 plays, 53 yards, 4:31.

Fourth quarter

- BAL – Willis McGahee 3-yard run (run failed), 10:32. Ravens 33–14. Drive: 12 plays, 52 yards, 6:15.

Top passers

- BAL – Joe Flacco – 4/10, 34 yards, INT
- NE – Tom Brady – 23/42, 154 yards, 2 TD, 3 INT

Top rushers

- BAL – Ray Rice – 22 rushes, 159 yards, 2 TD
- NE – Kevin Faulk – 14 rushes, 52 yards

Top receivers

- BAL – Mark Clayton – 1 reception, 17 yards
- NE – Randy Moss – 5 receptions, 48 yards

The Ravens converted three first-quarter turnovers by Patriots quarterback Tom Brady into 17 points on their way to a 24–0 lead New England could not recover from. It was the Patriots' first home loss of the season and their first home playoff loss in more than 30 years. On top of that, it was the Ravens' first win against the Patriots after five consecutive losses.

Baltimore stormed to a 7–0 lead on the first play of the game with Ray Rice's 83-yard touchdown run, the second longest run in NFL playoff history. Then, linebacker Terrell Suggs forced and recovered a fumble from Brady on the Patriots 17-yard line, and they scored another touchdown with a 1-yard run by Le'Ron McClain. Following an exchange of punts, cornerback Chris Carr intercepted a pass from Brady and returned it to the New England 25-yard line, setting up a drive ending in Rice's second touchdown on a 1-yard run. Just two plays after the ensuing kickoff, Ravens safety Ed Reed intercepted a deep pass from Brady and returned it 25 yards before lateraling the ball to safety Dawan Landry, who took it another 25 yards to the Patriots 9-yard line. The Ravens could not gain any yards on their ensuing drive, but Billy Cundiff kicked a field goal to make the score 24–0.

New England was forced to punt on their next drive, but Baltimore returner Tom Zbikowski muffed the catch and Kyle Arrington recovered the ball for the Patriots at the Ravens 16-yard line. Five plays later, Brady threw a 6-yard touchdown pass to Julian Edelman. Midway through the second half, Brady threw his third interception of the game, this one to Landry, who returned it 42 yards to the New England 22-yard line to set up another Cundiff field goal. Taking the ball back to the Patriots 47-yard line after Darius Butler's 42-yard kickoff return, New England responded with a 53-yard scoring drive. Brady finished it with his second touchdown pass to Edelman to cut their deficit to 27–14.

Zbikowski returned the ensuing kickoff 30 yards to his own 48-yard line, sparking a 52-yard drive that ended with a 3-yard touchdown run from Willis McGahee, making the score 33–14 after the two-point conversion failed. New England responded with a drive deep into Baltimore territory, but Stephen Gostkowski missed a 44-yard field goal attempt with 7:19 left in the game, ending any chance of a miracle comeback.

Rice rushed for 159 yards and two touchdowns, while McGahee added 62 yards and a score. Neither quarterback had much success, as Brady was held to 154 yards and intercepted three times, while Baltimore's Joe Flacco completed only 4 of 10 passes for 34 yards.

The Patriots would not be eliminated in the Wild Card Round again until 2019. In fact, they would not play in the Wild Card round again until that 2019 season.

This was the first postseason meeting between the Ravens and Patriots.

==== NFC: Arizona Cardinals 51, Green Bay Packers 45 (OT) ====
Green Bay Packers vs. Arizona Cardinals – Game summary

Quarter	1	2	3	4	OT	Total
Packers	0	10	14	21	0	45
Cardinals	17	7	14	7	6	51

at University of Phoenix Stadium, Glendale, Arizona

- Game time: 4:40 p.m. EST/2:40 p.m. MST
- Game weather: None (retractable roof closed)
- Game attendance: 61,926
- Referee: Scott Green (19)
- TV announcers (Fox): Joe Buck (play-by-play), Troy Aikman (color commentator), Pam Oliver, and Chris Myers (sideline reporters)
- Recap, Game Book

Game information

First quarter

- ARI – Tim Hightower 1-yard run (Neil Rackers kick), 11:04. Cardinals 7–0. Drive: 7 plays, 40 yards, 3:38.
- ARI – Early Doucet 15-yard pass from Kurt Warner (Neil Rackers kick), 9:16. Cardinals 14–0. Drive: 2 plays, 22 yards, 0:48.
- ARI – Neil Rackers 23-yard field goal, 0:34. Cardinals 17–0. Drive: 9 plays, 54 yards, 5:20.

Second quarter

- GB – Aaron Rodgers 1-yard run (Mason Crosby kick), 6:52. Cardinals 17–7. Drive: 6 plays, 52 yards, 4:14.
- ARI – Early Doucet 15-yard pass from Kurt Warner (Neil Rackers kick), 2:16. Cardinals 24–7. Drive: 8 plays, 79 yards, 4:36.
- GB – Mason Crosby 20-yard field goal, 0:00. Cardinals 24–10. Drive: 8 plays, 73 yards, 2:16.

Third quarter

- ARI – Larry Fitzgerald 33-yard pass from Kurt Warner (Neil Rackers kick), 11:15. Cardinals 31–10. Drive: 6 plays, 80 yards, 3:45.
- GB – Greg Jennings 6-yard pass from Aaron Rodgers (Mason Crosby kick), 7:20. Cardinals 31–17. Drive: 10 plays, 80 yards, 3:55.
- GB – Jordy Nelson 10-yard pass from Aaron Rodgers (Mason Crosby kick), 4:07. Cardinals 31–24. Drive: 8 plays, 57 yards, 3:13.
- ARI – Larry Fitzgerald 11-yard pass from Kurt Warner (Neil Rackers kick), 2:34. Cardinals 38–24. Drive: 3 plays, 73 yards, 1:33.

Fourth quarter

- GB – James Jones 30-yard pass from Aaron Rodgers (Mason Crosby kick), 14:08. Cardinals 38–31. Drive: 8 plays, 80 yards, 3:26.
- GB – John Kuhn 1-yard run (Mason Crosby kick), 10:57. Tied 38–38. Drive: 3 plays, 67 yards, 0:56.
- ARI – Steve Breaston 17-yard pass from Kurt Warner (Neil Rackers kick), 4:55. Cardinals 45–38. Drive: 11 plays, 80 yards, 6:02.
- GB – Spencer Havner 11-yard pass from Aaron Rodgers (Mason Crosby kick), 1:52. Tied 45–45. Drive: 7 plays, 71 yards, 3:03.

Overtime

- ARI – Karlos Dansby 17-yard fumble return, 13:42. Cardinals 51–45.

Top passers

- GB – Aaron Rodgers – 28/42, 422 yards, 4 TD
- ARI – Kurt Warner – 29/33, 379 yards, 5 TD

Top rushers

- GB – Ryan Grant – 11 rushes, 65 yards
- ARI – Beanie Wells – 14 rushes, 91 yards

Top receivers

- GB – Jermichael Finley – 6 receptions, 159 yards
- ARI – Steve Breaston – 7 receptions, 125 yards, TD

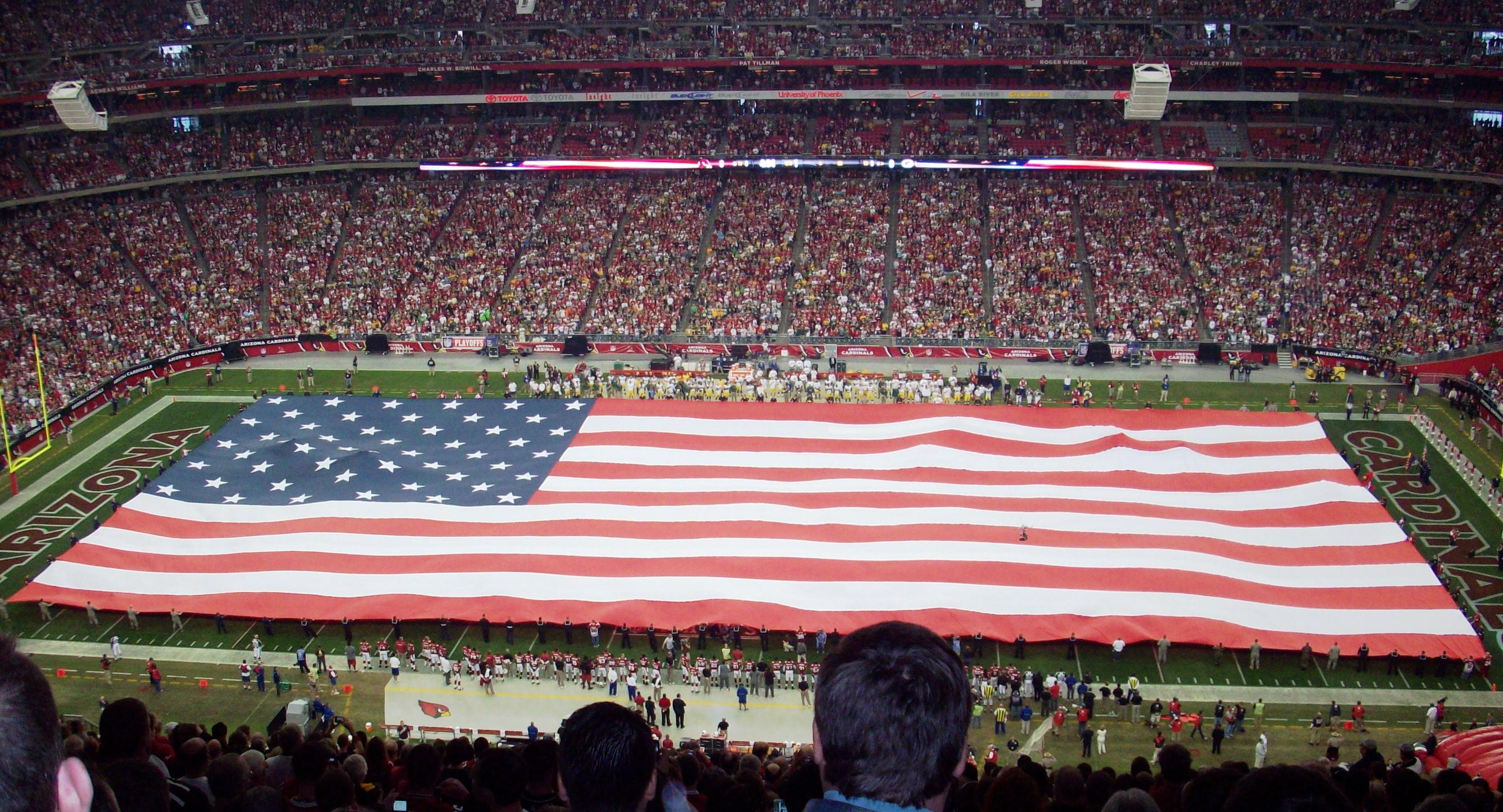
The presentation of the flag and singing of The Star-Spangled Banner before the start of the Packers vs. Cardinals Wild Card Game.

This high scoring shootout set the NFL postseason record for most points (96), touchdowns (13) and first downs (62), while ranking third in total yards (1,024). But in the end, it was a defensive play that made the key difference when Cardinals linebacker Karlos Dansby returned a fumble 17 yards for a touchdown in overtime. This was only the second overtime game in NFL postseason history to be won by a defensive touchdown. The first one had been won by the Packers (vs. the Seattle Seahawks in 2003).

Arizona forced two early turnovers and built up a quick 17–0 lead. First, defensive back Dominique Rodgers-Cromartie's interception of an Aaron Rodgers pass set up a 1-yard touchdown run by Tim Hightower. Then Dansby forced a fumble from Packers receiver Donald Driver that defensive tackle Alan Branch recovered on the Green Bay 22-yard line, leading to Kurt Warner's 15-yard touchdown pass to Early Doucet. After a Green Bay punt, Warner led the Cardinals down the field, hitting Larry Fitzgerald for 14 yards, tight end Ben Patrick for 22, and Steve Breaston for 15 on the way to a 23-yard field goal from Neil Rackers.

Early in the second quarter, Packers cornerback Charles Woodson stripped the ball from Fitzgerald, and linebacker Clay Matthews returned the fumble 28 yards to the Green Bay 48. Aided by three Cardinals penalties, Green Bay drove 52 yards and scored on a 1-yard touchdown run from Rodgers. Arizona responded by driving 79 yards and scoring with Warner's second touchdown pass to Doucet. But Rodgers struck back with a pair of completions to tight end Jermichael Finley for gains of 44 and 17 yards on the way to a 20-yard field goal by Mason Crosby, cutting the score to 24–10 at halftime.

The second half opened up with five touchdowns on five consecutive drives. First, Warner threw his third touchdown pass of the day with a 33-yard strike to Fitzgerald. Rodgers responded with an 18-yard completion to Finley and a 35-yard strike to Greg Jennings before Jennings finished the drive with a 6-yard touchdown catch. Then Green Bay surprised Arizona with an onside kick, which Brandon Underwood recovered on the Packers 43-yard line. Seven plays later, Rodgers threw a 10-yard touchdown pass to Jordy Nelson, cutting their deficit to 31–24. But a few plays after the ensuing kickoff, Beanie Wells' 42-yard run set up an 11-yard touchdown pass from Warner to Fitzgerald.

Early in the fourth quarter, Rodgers again closed the gap to one score with a 30-yard touchdown pass to James Jones. Then after forcing a punt, Rodgers completed a 38-yard strike to Finley and a 28-yarder to Driver at the Cardinals 1-yard line. Fullback John Kuhn scored a 1-yard touchdown run on the next play to tie the game. But Arizona retook the lead with their next drive as Warner completed seven passes, the last one a 17-yard touchdown toss to Breaston. Taking the ball back at the 29-yard line with just under five minutes left in regulation, Rodgers hit Jones for six yards, scrambled for 13 yards, and then hit Jennings for 22 yards and a first down at the Arizona 25-yard line. A few plays later, he finished the drive with an 11-yard touchdown pass to Spencer Havner, tying the game with less than two minutes to go. Arizona responded with a drive to the Green Bay 16-yard line, but Rackers missed a 34-yard field goal as time expired, sending the game into overtime.

Green Bay won the coin toss and got the ball first. But two plays into their drive, Cardinals defensive back Michael Adams sacked Rodgers as he was about to throw. The ball came out of Rodgers' hands, and a desperate Rodgers tried to kick the loose ball out of bounds, but it got away and went into the arms of Dansby, who returned the fumble 17 yards for a touchdown to win the game. A facemask penalty on Michael Adams on the play went uncalled, and there was also a missed helmet-to-helmet penalty on Bertrand Berry in the same drive.

In his first career playoff game, Rodgers set a franchise record with 422 passing yards and four touchdowns. Warner completed 29 of 33 passes for 379 yards and a franchise record five touchdowns. He became the second player in NFL history to throw five touchdown passes in two different postseason games, joining Daryle Lamonica (Warner had thrown five touchdown passes in his first NFL playoff game a decade earlier). The Cardinals' 51 points was the most allowed by the Packers in their 41 postseason games. Arizona gained 531 total yards, with 156 rushing yards, against a Packers defense that finished the season ranked first in the NFL against the run and second fewest yards allowed overall.

This was the second postseason meeting between the Packers and Cardinals, with Green Bay winning the only prior meeting 41–16 over the then-St. Louis Cardinals in the 1982 NFC First Round playoffs.

== Divisional round ==
=== Saturday, January 16, 2010 ===
==== NFC: New Orleans Saints 45, Arizona Cardinals 14 ====
Arizona Cardinals vs. New Orleans Saints – Game summary

Quarter	1	2	3	4	Total
Cardinals	7	7	0	0	14
Saints	21	14	10	0	45

at Louisiana Superdome, New Orleans, Louisiana

- Game time: 4:30 p.m. EST/3:30 p.m. CST
- Game weather: None (indoor stadium)
- Game attendance: 70,149
- Referee: Ron Winter (14)
- TV announcers (Fox): Kenny Albert (play by play), Daryl Johnston (color commentator) and Tony Siragusa (sideline reporter)
- Recap, Game Book

Game information

First quarter

- ARI – Tim Hightower 70-yard run (Neil Rackers kick), 14:41. Cardinals 7–0. Drive: 1 play, 70 yards, 0:19.
- NO – Lynell Hamilton 1-yard run (Garrett Hartley kick), 9:17. Tied 7–7. Drive: 10 plays, 72 yards, 5:24.
- NO – Jeremy Shockey 17-yard pass from Drew Brees (Garrett Hartley kick), 7:02. Saints 14–7. Drive: 4 plays, 37 yards, 1:58.
- NO – Reggie Bush 46-yard run (Garrett Hartley kick), 2:31. Saints 21–7. Drive: 5 plays, 77 yards, 2:54.

Second quarter

- ARI – Beanie Wells 4-yard run (Neil Rackers kick), 9:40. Saints 21–14. Drive: 9 plays, 80 yards, 5:07.
- NO – Devery Henderson 44-yard pass from Drew Brees (Garrett Hartley kick), 6:48. Saints 28–14. Drive: 6 plays, 83 yards, 2:52.
- NO – Marques Colston 2-yard pass from Drew Brees (Garrett Hartley kick), 1:10. Saints 35–14. Drive: 8 plays, 27 yards, 4:38.

Third quarter

- NO – Garrett Hartley 43-yard field goal, 8:26. Saints 38–14. Drive: 6 plays, 39 yards, 2:10.
- NO – Reggie Bush 83-yard punt return (Garrett Hartley kick), 6:42. Saints 45–14.

Fourth quarter

- No scoring plays.

Top passers

- ARI – Kurt Warner – 17/26, 205 yards
- NO – Drew Brees – 23/32, 247 yards, 3 TD

Top rushers

- ARI – Tim Hightower – 6 rushes, 87 yards, TD
- NO – Reggie Bush – 5 rushes, 84 yards, TD

Top receivers

- ARI – Larry Fitzgerald – 6 receptions, 77 yards
- NO – Marques Colston – 6 receptions, 83 yards, TD

Saints running back Reggie Bush accumulated 217 all-purpose yards, including an 83-yard punt return touchdown, the third longest in NFL postseason history, and a franchise playoff record 46-yard touchdown run, while quarterback Drew Brees added 247 passing yards and three touchdowns. Although Arizona scored first, New Orleans racked up a franchise playoff record 35 points in the first half on the way to a 45–14 win on their way to their first NFC Championship Game appearance since 2006.

Arizona opened up a 7–0 lead just 19 seconds into the first quarter when Tim Hightower ran through a hole in the line, cut left and took off down the field for a 70-yard touchdown run on the game's first play from scrimmage. New Orleans struck back with a 72-yard drive on the way to a 1-yard touchdown run by Lynell Hamilton to tie the score. On the first play of the following drive, defensive back Randall Gay stripped the ball from Cardinals wide receiver Jerheme Urban, forcing a fumble that Saints safety Darren Sharper returned 13 yards to the Arizona 37-yard line. Three plays later, Brees converted the turnover into points with a 17-yard touchdown pass to tight end Jeremy Shockey. Arizona was forced to punt on their next drive, and the Saints quickly scored again with a 46-yard touchdown run by Bush, increasing their lead to 21–7.

Just over five minutes into the second quarter, Arizona cut the score to 21–14 with a 4-yard touchdown run by Beanie Wells. But New Orleans again responded quickly, as Brees completed a 26-yard pass to Marques Colston and followed it up with a 44-yard touchdown pass to Devery Henderson on a flea flicker play. Then Saints defensive lineman Will Smith intercepted a pass from Kurt Warner (who was injured on the play) and returned it five yards to the Cardinals 27, setting up Brees' 2-yard touchdown pass to Colston to give the Saints a 35–14 lead. The Cardinals, now led by Matt Leinart, responded with a drive to the Saints 33-yard line, but Neil Rackers missed a 50-yard field goal as time expired in the half. The combined 49 points scored by both teams in the first half was an NFL postseason record.

In the second half, the Saints added 10 more points to their lead with a Garrett Hartley field goal and Bush's 83-yard punt return touchdown. Meanwhile, Arizona only managed one drive inside Saints territory, which ended in a turnover on downs on the 10-yard line. With the win, the Saints returned to the NFC Championship Game for the second time in four years, and would become the first one to be held in the Superdome. This was the final game of Warner's Hall of Fame career.

This was the first postseason meeting between the Cardinals and Saints.

==== AFC: Indianapolis Colts 20, Baltimore Ravens 3 ====
Baltimore Ravens vs. Indianapolis Colts – Game summary

Quarter	1	2	3	4	Total
Ravens	3	0	0	0	3
Colts	3	14	0	3	20

at Lucas Oil Stadium, Indianapolis, Indiana

- Game time: 8:15 p.m. EST
- Game weather: None (retractable roof closed)
- Game attendance: 67,535
- Referee: Carl Cheffers (51)
- TV announcers (CBS): Greg Gumbel (play-by-play) and Dan Dierdorf (color commentator)
- Recap, Game Book

Game information

First quarter

- IND – Matt Stover 44-yard field goal, 10:44. Colts 3–0. Drive: 10 plays, 54 yards, 4:16.
- BAL – Billy Cundiff 25-yard field goal, 2:57. Tied 3–3. Drive: 15 plays, 87 yards, 7:47.

Second quarter

- IND – Austin Collie 10-yard pass from Peyton Manning (Matt Stover kick), 2:00. Colts 10–3. Drive: 14 plays, 75 yards, 8:00.
- IND – Reggie Wayne 3-yard pass from Peyton Manning (Matt Stover kick), 0:03. Colts 17–3. Drive: 8 plays, 64 yards, 1:23.

Third quarter

- No scoring plays.

Fourth quarter

- IND – Matt Stover 33-yard field goal, 13:26. Colts 20–3. Drive: 14 plays, 56 yards, 7:21.

Top passers

- BAL – Joe Flacco – 20/35, 189 yards
- IND – Peyton Manning – 30/44, 246 yards, 2 TD

Top rushers

- BAL – Ray Rice – 13 rushes, 67 yards
- IND – Joseph Addai – 11 rushes, 23 yards

Top receivers

- BAL – Derrick Mason – 4 receptions, 64 yards
- IND – Reggie Wayne – 8 receptions, 63 yards, TD

In the first playoff game in Lucas Oil Stadium, Indianapolis quarterback Peyton Manning completed 30 passes for 246 yards and two touchdowns, while the Colts defense limited Baltimore to a single field goal on their opening drive.

Indianapolis kicker Matt Stover (a former Raven) opened up the scoring with a 44-yard field goal on the Colts' opening drive. Baltimore responded with a drive from their own 7 to the Colts 6-yard line where Billy Cundiff kicked a 25-yard field goal to tie the game.

In the second quarter, the Colts moved down the field on a 14-play, 75-yard drive that took eight minutes off the clock, their longest drive of the season. Manning finished the drive with a 10-yard touchdown pass to Austin Collie. After forcing a punt, the Colts got the ball back on their own 36-yard line, and they drove for another touchdown, moving the ball 64 yards in just 1:23 and scoring with Reggie Wayne's 3-yard touchdown catch as time expired in the half.

Midway through the third quarter, Ravens safety Ed Reed intercepted a pass from Manning and returned it 38 yards. But receiver Pierre Garçon ripped the ball out of his hands during the return, and tight end Dallas Clark recovered it. Later on, Reed intercepted another pass and returned it 58 yards, but the play was nullified by a pass interference penalty on defensive back Corey Ivy, allowing the Colts to keep possession and drive for another Stover field goal, making the score 20–3.

Indianapolis went on to seal the victory by forcing turnovers on the Ravens' next two drives. First Raheem Brock forced a fumble from Baltimore running back Ray Rice deep in Colts territory and linebacker Clint Session recovered it. Then following a punt, Colts defensive back Antoine Bethea picked off a pass from Joe Flacco on the Colts 2-yard line with less than five minutes left in the game.

This was the second postseason meeting between the Ravens and Colts, with Indianapolis winning the only prior meeting 15–6 in the 2006 AFC Divisional playoffs.

=== Sunday, January 17, 2010 ===
==== NFC: Minnesota Vikings 34, Dallas Cowboys 3 ====
Dallas Cowboys vs. Minnesota Vikings – Game summary

Quarter	1	2	3	4	Total
Cowboys	0	3	0	0	3
Vikings	7	10	0	17	34

at Hubert H. Humphrey Metrodome, Minneapolis, Minnesota

- Game time: 1:00 p.m. EST/12:00 p.m. CST
- Game weather: None (indoor stadium)
- Game attendance: 63,547
- Referee: Walt Anderson (66)
- TV announcers (Fox): Joe Buck (play by play), Troy Aikman (color commentator), Pam Oliver and Chris Myers (sideline reporters)
- Recap, Game Book

Game information

First quarter

- MIN – Sidney Rice 47-yard pass from Brett Favre (Ryan Longwell kick), 4:04. Vikings 7–0. Drive: 4 plays, 61 yards, 1:44.

Second quarter

- DAL – Shaun Suisham 33-yard field goal, 12:11. Vikings 7–3. Drive: 13 plays, 67 yards, 6:53.
- MIN – Sidney Rice 16-yard pass from Brett Favre (Ryan Longwell kick), 7:23. Vikings 14–3. Drive: 10 plays, 80 yards, 4:48.
- MIN – Ryan Longwell 23-yard field goal, 3:46. Vikings 17–3. Drive: 6 plays, 14 yards, 2:43.

Third quarter

- No scoring plays.

Fourth quarter

- MIN – Ryan Longwell 28-yard field goal, 14:23. Vikings 20–3. Drive: 4 plays, 5 yards, 1:44.
- MIN – Sidney Rice 45-yard pass from Brett Favre (Ryan Longwell kick), 7:32. Vikings 27–3. Drive: 7 plays, 86 yards, 4:27.
- MIN – Visanthe Shiancoe 11-yard pass from Brett Favre (Ryan Longwell kick), 1:55. Vikings 34–3. Drive: 6 plays, 37 yards, 3:31.

Top passers

- DAL – Tony Romo – 22/35, 198 yards
- MIN – Brett Favre – 15/24, 234 yards, 4 TD

Top rushers

- DAL – Felix Jones – 14 rushes, 69 yards
- MIN – Adrian Peterson – 26 rushes, 63 yards

Top receivers

- DAL – Jason Witten – 10 receptions, 98 yards
- MIN – Sidney Rice – 6 receptions, 141 yards, 3 TD

The Vikings defense dominated the Cowboys in the final playoff game in the Hubert H. Humphrey Metrodome, sacking quarterback Tony Romo six times, forcing him to fumble three times, and intercepting a pass, while Minnesota quarterback Brett Favre threw four touchdown passes, three to receiver Sidney Rice, who finished the game with 6 receptions for 141 yards.

Dallas started the game with two drives inside the Vikings 40-yard line, but didn't score on either one. First, Romo lost a fumble on the Vikings 35 while being tackled by Ray Edwards; it was recovered by the Vikings' Kevin Williams. Then after a punt, Dallas drove to the Vikings 30-yard line, only to have Shaun Suisham miss a 48-yard field goal. Four plays later, Minnesota took the lead with Favre throwing a 47-yard touchdown to Rice. Dallas responded with a drive from their own 18 to the Vikings 15-yard line where Suisham kicked a field goal to cut the score to 7–3. But the Vikings countered with another touchdown, with running back Adrian Peterson rushing for 18 yards and gaining 19 yards on a screen pass on the way to Favre's second touchdown throw to Rice, this one from 16 yards. Just two plays after the kickoff, Jared Allen sacked Romo, forcing a fumble that Minnesota's Ben Leber recovered on the Cowboys 20-yard line, leading to a Ryan Longwell field goal increasing the Vikings lead to 17–3 at the end of the first half.

In the second half, after another Dallas drive into Vikings territory that ended with a missed field goal attempt by Suisham, Leber intercepted a pass from Romo and returned it 10 yards to the Cowboys 15-yard line. Dallas kept the Vikings out of the end zone, but Longwell kicked another field goal to increase the lead to 20–3. Then, after a Dallas punt, Favre put the game away with a 45-yard touchdown completion to Rice with less than eight minutes left in the game. Later on, Dallas turned the ball over on downs on their own 37-yard line. Favre subsequently completed a 19-yard pass to Bernard Berrian before scoring the final points of the game on an 11-yard pass to tight end Visanthe Shiancoe.

Leber finished with eight tackles, a fumble recovery and an interception, while Edwards recorded five tackles, a forced fumble and three sacks. This was the first time the 40-year-old Favre had thrown four touchdown passes in his 22 playoff games. With the win, the Vikings advanced to their first NFC Championship Game in nine years and first under Childress.

This was the seventh postseason meeting between the Cowboys and Vikings, with Dallas winning four of the prior six meetings. Minnesota won the most recent meeting 27–10 in the 1999 NFC Wild Card playoffs.

==== AFC: New York Jets 17, San Diego Chargers 14 ====
New York Jets vs. San Diego Chargers – Game summary

Quarter	1	2	3	4	Total
Jets	0	0	3	14	17
Chargers	0	7	0	7	14

at Qualcomm Stadium, San Diego, California

- Game time: 4:40 p.m. EST/1:40 p.m. PST
- Game weather: Sunny, 63 °F (17 °C)
- Game attendance: 69,498
- Referee: Jerome Boger (23)
- TV announcers (CBS): Jim Nantz (play-by-play) and Phil Simms (color commentator)
- Recap, Game Book

Game information

First quarter

- No scoring plays.

Second quarter

- SD – Kris Wilson 13-yard pass from Philip Rivers (Nate Kaeding kick), 12:17. Chargers 7–0. Drive: 4 plays, 69 yards, 1:56.

Third quarter

- NYJ – Jay Feely 46-yard field goal, 10:45. Chargers 7–3. Drive: 8 plays, 32 yards, 4:15.

Fourth quarter

- NYJ – Dustin Keller 2-yard pass from Mark Sanchez (Jay Feely kick), 13:35. Jets 10–7. Drive: 4 plays, 16 yards, 1:27.
- NYJ – Shonn Greene 53-yard run (Jay Feely kick), 7:17. Jets 17–7. Drive: 4 plays, 66 yards, 2:10.
- SD – Philip Rivers 1-yard run (Nate Kaeding kick), 2:14. Jets 17–14. Drive: 7 plays, 63 yards, 1:22.

Top passers

- NYJ – Mark Sanchez – 12/23, 100 yards, TD, INT
- SD – Philip Rivers – 27/40, 298 yards, TD, 2 INT

Top rushers

- NYJ – Shonn Greene – 23 rushes, 128 yards, TD
- SD – Darren Sproles – 3 rushes, 33 yards

Top receivers

- NYJ – Braylon Edwards – 2 receptions, 41 yards
- SD – Vincent Jackson – 7 receptions, 111 yards

Trailing 7–0 at the end of the first half, New York scored 17 unanswered points and then sealed the victory with a fourth down conversion run from Thomas Jones with one minute left.

Early in the first quarter, Chargers quarterback Philip Rivers moved the ball to the Jets 22-yard line with a 13-yard completion to Vincent Jackson and a 19-yarder to Malcom Floyd. But the drive stalled on the 18-yard line and ended with no points when Nate Kaeding missed a 36-yard field goal. Meanwhile, New York failed to gain a first down in the entire quarter.

In the second quarter, Rivers hit Jacob Hester for 15 yards and tight end Antonio Gates for 23 on the way to a 13-yard touchdown completion to Kris Wilson. Later on, San Diego running back Darren Sproles' 22-yard run moved the ball to the Jets 39-yard line with six seconds left. But Kaeding missed a 57-yard field goal attempt as time expired in the half.

On the opening drive of the second half, the Jets got on the board with a 46-yard field goal from Jay Feely. Midway through the third quarter, the Chargers got another scoring opportunity when Quentin Jammer picked off a pass from Jets quarterback Mark Sanchez and returned it 24 yards to the New York 38-yard line. But three plays later, Rivers returned the favor when he threw a pass to Jackson that bounced off his body and into the arms of cornerback Darrelle Revis just before it hit the ground. The Jets were unable to convert the turnover into points, but Steve Weatherford's 54-yard punt pinned the Chargers back at their own 4-yard line. A few plays later, Rivers was intercepted again, this time by safety Jim Leonhard, who returned it 11 yards to the 16, setting up Sanchez's 2-yard touchdown pass to Dustin Keller. Then after forcing a punt, Jets running back Shonn Greene burst through the line, broke a tackle from Eric Weddle and took off for a 53-yard touchdown run, the longest in Jets postseason history, giving New York a 17–7 lead.

San Diego responded with a drive to the New York 22-yard line, but again came up empty when Kaeding missed his third field goal attempt of the day, this one with just 4:38 left in the game. After forcing a punt, Rivers completed a 37-yard pass to Jackson, a 19-yarder to Sproles and a 12-yard completion to Jackson at the 1-yard line before finishing the drive with a 1-yard touchdown run. This cut the score to 17–14 with 2:14 left in the game. Following the ensuing onside kickoff (which was recovered by the Jets' Kerry Rhodes), New York faced a fourth down and 1 with 1:03 left. Rather than punting, coach Rex Ryan decided to go for the first down. Jones' 2-yard run sealed the victory, enabling New York to run out the rest of the clock.

With the win, the Jets advanced to their first AFC Championship Game since 1998. They also won consecutive playoff games for the first time since 1982. Sanchez joined Ravens quarterback Joe Flacco as the only rookie quarterbacks in NFL history to win two playoff games. The Chargers have not won the AFC West since 2009 and relocated to Los Angeles after the 2016 season. As a result, this was the last playoff game the Chargers played in San Diego.

This was the second postseason meeting between the Jets and Chargers. New York won the only prior meeting 20–17 in overtime in the 2004 AFC Wild Card playoffs.

== Conference championships ==
=== Sunday, January 24, 2010 ===
==== AFC: Indianapolis Colts 30, New York Jets 17 ====
New York Jets vs. Indianapolis Colts – Game summary

Quarter	1	2	3	4	Total
Jets	0	17	0	0	17
Colts	0	13	7	10	30

at Lucas Oil Stadium, Indianapolis, Indiana

- Game time: 3:00 p.m. EST
- Game weather: None (retractable roof closed)
- Game attendance: 67,650
- Referee: Tony Corrente (99)
- TV announcers (CBS): Jim Nantz (play-by-play), Phil Simms (color commentator) and Steve Tasker (sideline reporter)
- Recap, Game Book

Game information

First quarter

- No scoring plays.

Second quarter

- IND – Matt Stover 25-yard field goal, 14:56. Colts 3–0. Drive: 8 plays, 82 yards, 3:41.
- NYJ – Braylon Edwards 80-yard pass from Mark Sanchez (Jay Feely kick), 14:45. Jets 7–3. Drive: 1 play, 80 yards, 0:11.
- IND – Matt Stover 19-yard field goal, 8:44. Jets 7–6. Drive: 12 plays, 79 yards, 6:01.
- NYJ – Dustin Keller 9-yard pass from Mark Sanchez (Jay Feely kick), 4:53. Jets 14–6. Drive: 7 plays, 77 yards, 3:51.
- NYJ – Jay Feely 48-yard field goal, 2:11. Jets 17–6. Drive: 4 plays, −1 yards, 1:29.
- IND – Austin Collie 16-yard pass from Peyton Manning (Matt Stover kick), 1:13. Jets 17–13. Drive: 4 plays, 80 yards, 0:58.

Third quarter

- IND – Pierre Garçon 4-yard pass from Peyton Manning (Matt Stover kick), 8:03. Colts 20–17. Drive: 8 plays, 57 yards, 3:31.

Fourth quarter

- IND – Dallas Clark 15-yard pass from Peyton Manning (Matt Stover kick), 8:52. Colts 27–17. Drive: 7 plays, 80 yards, 3:33.
- IND – Matt Stover 21-yard field goal, 2:29. Colts 30–17. Drive: 12 plays, 71 yards, 5:33.

Top passers

- NYJ – Mark Sanchez – 17/30, 257 yards, 2 TD
- IND – Peyton Manning – 26/39, 377 yards, 3 TD

Top rushers

- NYJ – Thomas Jones – 16 rushes, 42 yards
- IND – Joseph Addai – 16 rushes, 80 yards

Top receivers

- NYJ – Jerricho Cotchery – 5 receptions, 102 yards
- IND – Pierre Garçon – 11 receptions, 151 yards, TD

This game was the first time in NFL history that two first-year head coaches met in any conference championship game. The Colts defeated the Jets for the first time in the postseason and advanced to their second Super Bowl in the last four seasons. Colts quarterback Peyton Manning threw for 377 yards and three touchdowns as his team recovered from an 11-point deficit by scoring 24 unanswered points.

After forcing Indianapolis to punt on their opening drive, New York drove from their own 29 to the Colts 22-yard line. But the Colts defense tightened up, tackling running back Shonn Greene twice behind the line of scrimmage and Brad Smith for a 1-yard gain, and then Jay Feely was wide right on a 44-yard field goal attempt.

In the second quarter, the Colts put together the first scoring drive of the game, with Manning completing two passes to Pierre Garçon for gains of 27 and 36 yards on the way to a 25-yard Matt Stover field goal. New York answered on the first play of their next drive with the longest play in the Jets' postseason history, as Mark Sanchez threw a pass to Braylon Edwards, who took off past Jacob Lacey and caught the ball without breaking stride for an 80-yard touchdown completion.

Manning led the Colts back on their next drive, completing a 25-yard pass to Reggie Wayne and a 22-yarder to Austin Collie at the Jets 4-yard line. But Indianapolis could not get into the end zone. Following an incomplete pass, Collie was tackled at the 1-yard line and then Manning was stuffed for no gain on a quarterback sneak, forcing them to settle for a second field goal from Stover to cut the score to 7–6. But New York struck back again. After three carries by Greene for 17 yards, Smith's 45-yard completion to Jerricho Cotchery from the Wildcat formation moved the ball to the Colts 12-yard line, setting up Sanchez's 9-yard touchdown pass to Dustin Keller with 4:53 left in the half. Three plays after the ensuing kickoff, Jets lineman Calvin Pace stormed through the line and tackled Joseph Addai as soon as he took a handoff, resulting in a fumble that safety Jim Leonhard recovered and returned to the Indianapolis 29-yard line. New York was unable to gain a first down with their drive, but Feely kicked a 48-yard field goal to increase their lead to 17–6.

However, the Colts stormed back with 24 unanswered points. Manning responded to the field goal with three completions to Collie for 80 yards, the last one a 16-yard touchdown pass to cut the score to 17–13 at the end of the half. Then after a missed 52-yard field goal on New York's opening drive of the third quarter, Manning completed 6 of 7 passes for 57 yards on the way to his second touchdown pass, this one a 4-yarder to Garçon. Manning added his third touchdown pass, a 15-yard strike to Dallas Clark, six minutes into the fourth quarter. Then after a punt, a 16-yard run by Addai and a 23-yard catch from Garçon set up Stover's third field goal to make the score 30–17. Finally, Indianapolis sealed the game when Kelvin Hayden picked off a pass from Sanchez with just over two minutes remaining.

This was the third postseason meeting between the Jets and Colts, with New York winning both meetings, including 41–0 in the 2002 AFC Wild Card playoffs. They also met in Super Bowl III as the NFL champion Baltimore Colts and AFL champion New York Jets, with the Jets winning 16–7.

==== NFC: New Orleans Saints 31, Minnesota Vikings 28 (OT) ====
Minnesota Vikings vs. New Orleans Saints – Game summary

Quarter	1	2	3	4	OT	Total
Vikings	14	0	7	7	0	28
Saints	7	7	7	7	3	31

at Louisiana Superdome, New Orleans, Louisiana

- Game time: 6:40 p.m. EST/5:40 p.m. CST
- Game weather: None (indoor stadium)
- Game attendance: 71,276
- Referee: Pete Morelli (135)
- TV announcers (Fox): Joe Buck (play-by-play), Troy Aikman (color commentator), Pam Oliver and Chris Myers (sideline reporters)
- Recap, Game Book

Game information

First quarter

- MIN – Adrian Peterson 19-yard run (Ryan Longwell kick), 9:35. Vikings 7–0. Drive: 10 plays, 80 yards, 5:25.
- NO – Pierre Thomas 38-yard pass from Drew Brees (Garrett Hartley kick), 6:30. Tied 7–7. Drive: 7 plays, 76 yards, 3:05.
- MIN – Sidney Rice 5-yard pass from Brett Favre (Ryan Longwell kick), 2:11. Vikings 14–7. Drive: 10 plays, 73 yards, 4:19.

Second quarter

- NO – Devery Henderson 9-yard pass from Drew Brees (Garrett Hartley kick), 10:30. Tied 14–14. Drive: 7 plays, 64 yards, 2:51.

Third quarter

- NO – Pierre Thomas 9-yard run (Garrett Hartley kick), 12:56. Saints 21–14. Drive: 4 plays, 37 yards, 2:04.
- MIN – Adrian Peterson 1-yard run (Ryan Longwell kick), 7:35. Tied 21–21. Drive: 9 plays, 80 yards, 5:21.

Fourth quarter

- NO – Reggie Bush 5-yard pass from Drew Brees (Garrett Hartley kick), 12:39. Saints 28–21. Drive: 3 plays, 7 yards, 1:31.
- MIN – Adrian Peterson 2-yard run (Ryan Longwell kick), 4:58. Tied 28–28. Drive: 7 plays, 57 yards, 2:59.

Overtime

- NO – Garrett Hartley 40-yard field goal, 10:15. Saints 31–28. Drive: 10 plays, 39 yards, 4:45.

Top passers

- MIN – Brett Favre – 28/46, 310 yards, TD
- NO – Drew Brees – 17/31, 197 yards, 3 TD

Top rushers

- MIN – Adrian Peterson – 25 rushes, 122 yards, 3 TD
- NO – Pierre Thomas – 14 rushes, 61 yards

Top receivers

- MIN – Bernard Berrian – 9 receptions, 102 yards
- NO – Devery Henderson – 4 receptions, 39 yards, TD

For the second time in three seasons, the NFC Championship Game required overtime to decide a winner. As in that game and the two other overtime games in the history of the conference championship games, the winning score was a field goal, this one from Saints kicker Garrett Hartley. The Vikings outgained New Orleans in total yards 475 to 257, and overcame five turnovers (three fumbles and two interceptions) to send the game to overtime. For the second time in 11 seasons, the Vikings were defeated by a field goal in a conference championship game, as they had lost by the same differential to the Atlanta Falcons in the 1998 NFC Championship Game. This would turn out to be Brett Favre's final playoff game.

The Vikings scored on the opening drive of the game as Adrian Peterson ran it into the end zone from 19 yards out. The Saints responded on the next drive, when Drew Brees threw a 38-yard touchdown pass to halfback Pierre Thomas that tied the game. Aided by three Saints penalties, the Vikings scored on their subsequent drive as Favre threw a touchdown pass to Sidney Rice and took a 14–7 lead.

New Orleans tied the game on their first drive of the second quarter with Brees' 9-yard touchdown pass to Devery Henderson. Later on, the Vikings got a scoring opportunity when New Orleans running back Reggie Bush muffed a punt that Minnesota's Kenny Onatolu recovered on the Saints 10-yard line. But two plays after that, the Vikings lost the ball themselves on a fumbled handoff from Favre to Peterson that was recovered by linebacker Scott Fujita with less than a minute left in the half.

The Saints' started the second half with a scoring drive that only took 2:04, set up by a 61-yard kickoff return from Courtney Roby. Thomas scored his second touchdown of the game on a 9-yard run and gave New Orleans their first lead of the game. Favre responded by leading the Vikings right back down the field, completing three passes to tight end Visanthe Shiancoe for 67 yards on an 80-yard drive that ended with Peterson scoring for the second time on a 1-yard touchdown run. After a Saints punt, Minnesota drove to the New Orleans 33-yard line, where Saints linebacker Jonathan Vilma ended the drive by intercepting a pass intended for Rice. The Vikings defense managed to force another punt, but once again they turned the ball over as Saints defensive lineman Will Smith forced a fumble from Percy Harvin that Remi Ayodele recovered and returned to the Vikings 7-yard line.

Following the turnover, New Orleans regained the lead early in the fourth quarter, as Brees threw his third touchdown pass of the game, this one a 5-yard toss to Bush, which was initially ruled down at the 1-yard line but changed to a touchdown after a Saints replay challenge. The Vikings responded with a drive inside the Saints 20-yard line, featuring a 27-yard run by Peterson and a 30-yard reception by Bernard Berrian, but once again the Saints defense forced a turnover, this time on a fumble by Berrian that was knocked free by defensive back Tracy Porter and recovered by Vilma. However, the Vikings defense quickly forced a punt, getting the ball back for the offense with great field position at the Minnesota 43-yard line. After a 16-yard reception by Shiancoe and an 18-yard run by Peterson, an 18-yard pass interference penalty on Porter moved the ball to the Saints 1-yard line. Peterson scored his third touchdown on the next play, tying the score with just over eight minutes left in the game.

After forcing a punt, the Vikings got the ball back with 2:42 left and drove to the Saints 33-yard line, within range of a potential game-winning field goal by kicker Ryan Longwell. However, on the next two plays, Peterson and running back Chester Taylor were both tackled for no gain. Then, after calling a timeout with 19 seconds left, Minnesota was flagged for having 12 men in the huddle and penalized five yards, bringing up third down and 15 from the 38. On the next play, the Vikings decided to pass in an attempt to move the ball into better field goal range, but Porter intercepted a desperate throw from Favre, ending the drive and sending the game into overtime.

The Saints won the coin toss in overtime and never gave up the ball. Thomas returned Longwell's kickoff 40 yards to the New Orleans 39, and the team gained 39 additional yards on 10 plays, including a fourth down conversion leap attempt by Thomas. The Saints were aided by a defensive holding penalty by cornerback Asher Allen and a pass interference penalty called against linebacker Ben Leber. Brees threw to Robert Meachem at the 23-yard line, controversially ruled a catch on the field and upheld by the booth, despite replays appearing to show the ball being moved by contact with the ground as Meachem attempted to gather it. This is where the drive stalled; Hartley was called on to try the first field goal of the game and connected from 40 yards out, sending the Saints to their first Super Bowl after 43 years in the NFL.

Four records were set in the game, three by Favre. He broke the career postseason pass attempts and passing yards records, but also set the record for most career postseason interceptions following his two picks in this game. It was the second time in three years that an interception thrown by Favre had helped to cost his team a conference championship, with his interception in overtime against the New York Giants in 2008 leading to a field goal that eliminated the Green Bay Packers. The Vikings outgained the Saints 475–257, which was the biggest yardage differential for a losing team in NFL postseason history. With his game winning kick Hartley joined Rich Karlis, Morten Andersen and Lawrence Tynes as the only four players in NFL history to score the winning points in a conference championship game decided in overtime. All four games were decided by field goals, with Hartley becoming the first to win an overtime game for the home team (in all three previous games, the home team was defeated). The two teams had nine fumbles between them in the game, with Peterson and Brees leading all players with two each. Minnesota fumbled six times and lost three of them. Peterson finished with 25 carries for 122 yards and three touchdowns, along with 2 receptions for 14 yards.

The outcome of this game was a factor in the NFL amending its rules during the ensuing offseason regarding overtime in playoff games, although the Vikings voted against the rule change. The change being that when the team receiving the ball first in overtime scores a field goal in their opening drive, the opposing team then gets a possession to try to score as well.

The excessive roughness of the Saints throughout the game was noted in the varied media broadcasts at the time, but its reputation became more controversial in 2012 with the publicity surrounding what would be known as Bountygate.

This was the third postseason meeting between the Vikings and Saints. Minnesota won both previous meetings, including the most recent meeting 34–16 in the 2000 NFC Divisional playoffs.

== Super Bowl XLIV: New Orleans Saints 31, Indianapolis Colts 17 ==
Super Bowl XLIV – New Orleans Saints vs. Indianapolis Colts – Game summary

Quarter	1	2	3	4	Total
Saints (NFC)	0	6	10	15	31
Colts (AFC)	10	0	7	0	17

at Sun Life Stadium, Miami Gardens, Florida

- Date: February 7, 2010
- Game time: 6:32 p.m. EST
- Game weather: Clear, 60 °F (16 °C)
- Game attendance: 74,059
- Referee: Scott Green (19)
- TV announcers (CBS): Jim Nantz (play-by-play), Phil Simms (color commentator), Steve Tasker and Solomon Wilcots (sideline reporters)
- Recap, Game Book

Game information

First quarter

- IND – Matt Stover 38-yard field goal, 7:29. Colts 3–0. Drive: 11 plays, 53 yards, 5:53.
- IND – Pierre Garçon 19-yard pass from Peyton Manning (Matt Stover kick), 0:36. Colts 10–0. Drive: 11 plays, 96 yards, 4:36.

Second quarter

- NO – Garrett Hartley 46-yard field goal, 9:34. Colts 10–3. Drive: 11 plays, 60 yards, 6:02.
- NO – Garrett Hartley 44-yard field goal, 0:00. Colts 10–6. Drive: 5 plays, 26 yards, 0:35.

Third quarter

- NO – Pierre Thomas 16-yard pass from Drew Brees (Garrett Hartley kick), 11:41. Saints 13–10. Drive: 6 plays, 58 yards, 3:19.
- IND – Joseph Addai 4-yard run (Matt Stover kick), 6:15. Colts 17–13. Drive: 10 plays, 76 yards, 5:26.
- NO – Garrett Hartley 47-yard field goal, 2:01. Colts 17–16. Drive: 8 plays, 37 yards, 4:14.

Fourth quarter

- NO – Jeremy Shockey 2-yard pass from Drew Brees (Drew Brees–Lance Moore pass), 5:42. Saints 24–17. Drive: 9 plays, 59 yards, 4:57.
- NO – Tracy Porter 74-yard interception return (Garrett Hartley kick), 3:12. Saints 31–17.

Top passers

- NO – Drew Brees – 32/39, 288 yards, 2 TD
- IND – Peyton Manning – 31/45, 333 yards, TD, INT

Top rushers

- NO – Pierre Thomas – 9 rushes, 30 yards
- IND – Joseph Addai – 13 rushes, 77 yards, TD

Top receivers

- NO – Marques Colston – 7 receptions, 83 yards
- IND – Dallas Clark – 7 receptions, 86 yards

This was the first Super Bowl meeting between the Saints and Colts.
