= The Facility =

Sports talk show broadcast by FS1

- Genre: Talk show
- Starring: Emmanuel Acho; Chase Daniel; James Jones; LeSean McCoy
- Country of origin: United States
- Original language: English

Production
- Production locations: Los Angeles, California
- Running time: 120 minutes

Original release
- Network: Fox Sports 1
- Release: September 3, 2024 – July 14, 2025

The Facility is an American sports and entertainment talk show starring Emmanuel Acho, Chase Daniel, James Jones, and LeSean McCoy; all four hosts are former National Football League (NFL) players. The series premiered on Fox Sports 1 (FS1) on September 3, 2024.

== History and development ==
The series aired during FS1's 10 a.m. to 12 p.m. (ET) time slot, with the late morning slot previously filled by Undisputed. That show experienced the departure of both of its longtime hosts, Shannon Sharpe and Skip Bayless, in 2023 and 2024, respectively. After Bayless announced his departure from the series and FS1 altogether, the network announced it would be reworking its programming schedule.

Hosted from Los Angeles, The Facility was led into by Breakfast Ball and itself served as a lead-in to The Herd with Colin Cowherd. The Facility was hosted by a panel entirely made up of former NFL players: Emmanuel Acho, Chase Daniel, James Jones, and LeSean McCoy. Acho, Jones, and McCoy previously served as co-hosts on Speak. The Facility served as Daniel's debut with FS1, aside from a guest appearance on The Herd with Colin Cowherd a few months prior. The series premiered on September 3, 2024. In October, Awful Announcing reported that the show was averaging 121,000 viewers per episode.

In July 2025, The Athletic announced the cancelation of three FS1 shows, including The Facility, as the network retooled its programming lineup.
