= James Jones (wide receiver) =

American football player (born 1984)

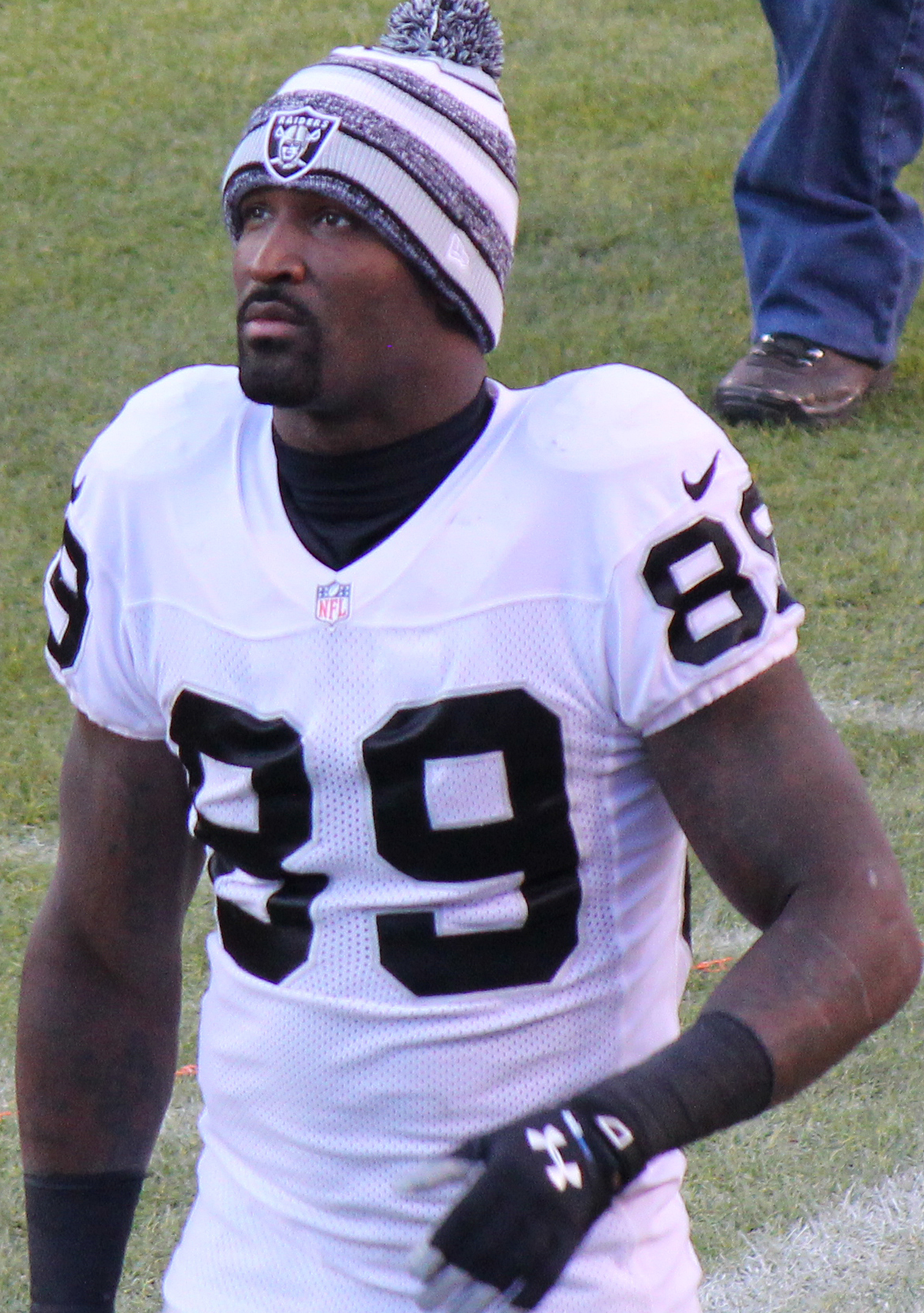
- Jones with the Oakland Raiders in 2014

No. 89
- Position: Wide receiver

Personal information
- Born: March 31, 1984 (age 42); San Jose, California, U.S.
- Listed height: 6 ft 1 in (1.85 m)
- Listed weight: 208 lb (94 kg)

Career information
- High school: Gunderson (San Jose, California)
- College: San Jose State (2002–2006)
- NFL draft: 2007: 3rd round, 78th overall pick

Career history
- Green Bay Packers (2007–2013); Oakland Raiders (2014); New York Giants (2015)*; Green Bay Packers (2015); San Diego Chargers (2016)*
- * Offseason or practice squad member only

Awards and highlights
- Super Bowl champion (XLV); NFL receiving touchdowns leader (2012); Second-team All-WAC (2006); New Mexico Bowl Offensive MVP (2006)

Career NFL statistics
- Receptions: 433
- Receiving yards: 5,861
- Receiving touchdowns: 51
- Stats at Pro Football Reference

James Deandre Jones (born March 31, 1984) is an American former professional football player who was a wide receiver in the National Football League (NFL). He played college football for the San Jose State Spartans and was selected by the Green Bay Packers in the third round of the 2007 NFL draft. With the Packers, he helped them win Super Bowl XLV over the Pittsburgh Steelers. He also played for the Oakland Raiders. After his playing career, Jones went into sports media and became an NFL Network analyst. In September 2024, he became a co-host on Fox Sports 1's (FS1) sports talk show The Facility.

== Early life ==
Jones and his mother, Janet, lived in various homeless shelters. Jones then lived with his paternal grandmother during his high school years. At Gunderson High School in San Jose, California, Jones played basketball, track, and football. During his senior year, Jones was his team's most valuable player as a quarterback. Jones credits his Pop Warner football coach, Marion Larrea, with turning his life around. Larrea saw potential in Jones and treated him as part of his own family. Jones fine-tuned his skills at San Jose State under the leadership of wideout coach Keith (K-Dubb) Williams. After winning Super Bowl XLV in 2011, Jones autographed and gave his game-worn jersey to Larrea, saying he would not have achieved what he did without him.

== College career ==
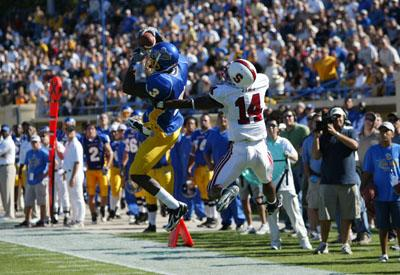
Jones catches a touchdown pass against Stanford in 2006 in the Bill Walsh Legacy Game

After three years at San Jose State University, Jones had a breakthrough 2006 senior season, where he caught 70 passes, good for 893 yards and 10 touchdowns. Jones capped off his senior season by catching six passes (106 yards), two for touchdowns, en route to being named the offensive MVP of the inaugural New Mexico Bowl. His accomplishments his senior year earned him second-team All-WAC honors along with an invite to the NFL Combine in Indianapolis, Indiana.

== Professional career ==
Pre-draft measurables
Height	Weight	Arm length	Hand span	40-yard dash	10-yard split	20-yard split	20-yard shuttle	Three-cone drill	Vertical jump	Broad jump	Bench press	Wonderlic
6 ft 0 3/4 in (1.85 m)	207 lb (94 kg)	32 1/2 in (0.83 m)	9 3/4 in (0.25 m)	4.58 s	1.49 s	2.62 s	4.20 s	7.06 s	35 in (0.89 m)	10 ft 6 in (3.20 m)	22 reps	9
Arm and hand spans from Pro Day at San Jose State on March 6, 2007; other measurables from the NFL Scouting Combine

=== Green Bay Packers (first stint) ===
Jones was selected by the Green Bay Packers in the third round of the 2007 NFL draft with the 78th overall pick.

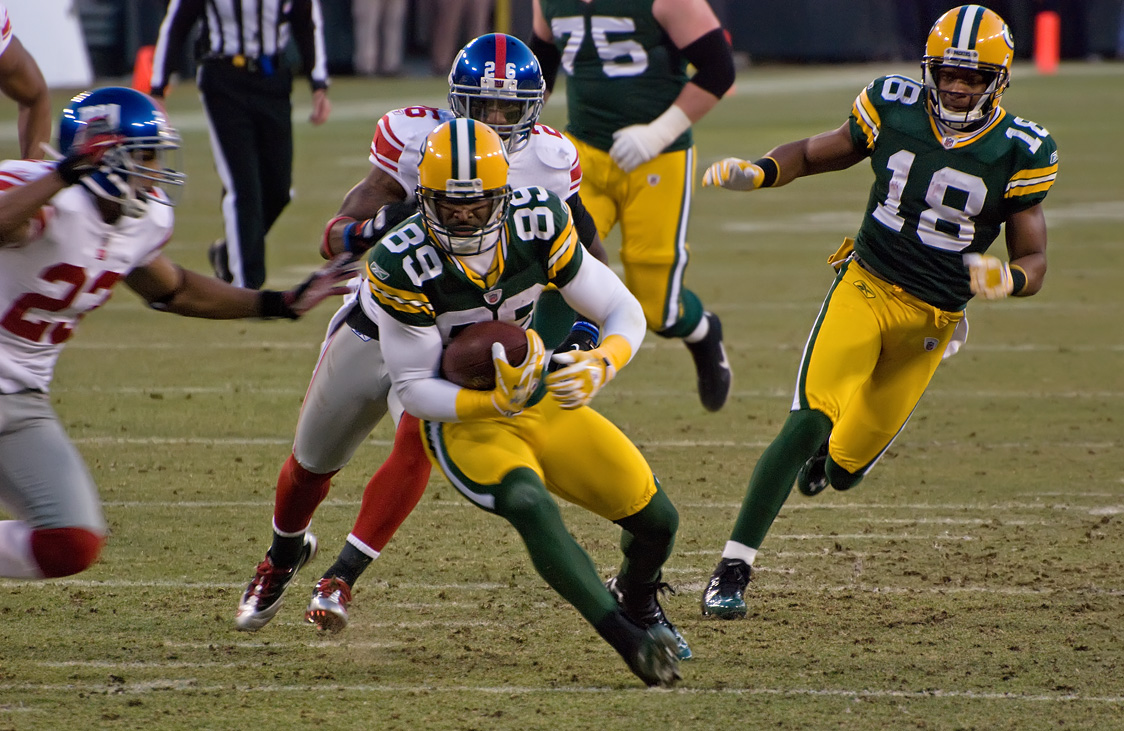
Jones with the Packers in 2012.

Jones was a starter for the Packers in the first game of the 2007 season. He caught four passes for 29 total yards in a 16–13 victory over the Philadelphia Eagles. Jones scored his first professional touchdown in a week four match-up vs. the Minnesota Vikings at the Metrodome. With Green Bay leading 16–9, Brett Favre hit Jones on a pass down the right sideline that went 33 yards for a touchdown, giving Green Bay a 22–9 lead. The Packers would end up winning the game 23–16. Jones was announced as the Diet Pepsi NFL Rookie of the Week for games played on October 28–29, 2007. Jones had three receptions for 107 yards including a first-quarter 79-yard touchdown in the Packers' 19–13 win over the Denver Broncos. Jones finished the year with 47 receptions for 676 yards and two touchdowns.

In the 2008 season, Jones finished with 20 receptions for 274 yards and one touchdown in ten games.

Throughout the 2009 season, Jones remained third on the depth chart, behind longtime veterans Donald Driver and Greg Jennings. In 2009, Jones caught 32 passes, had 440 receiving yards, and scored five touchdowns. Jones added three receptions, 50 yards, and one touchdown in Green Bay's Wild Card playoff overtime 51–45 loss against the Arizona Cardinals.

In 2010, Jones finished the season with 50 receptions for 679 yards and five touchdowns. He scored two touchdowns in the 2010–11 NFL Playoffs, one in the Wild Card against the Philadelphia Eagles and another in the Divisional Round against the Atlanta Falcons. The Packers would go on to win Super Bowl XLV against the Pittsburgh Steelers, with Jones catching five passes for 50 yards in Green Bay's 31–25 win.

Jones became a free agent in 2011. During the off season, it was widely speculated that Jones would seek a higher salary with another team. However, he signed a three-year contract to remain with the Packers on July 31. In 2011, Jones accumulated 38 catches, 635 receiving yards, and scored 7 touchdowns.

In 2012, Jones started all 16 regular season games for the first time in his career. He ended the season with a career-high 64 receptions, 784 receiving yards, and 14 touchdowns. His 14 touchdown receptions led the entire NFL. On October 14, 2012, Jones caught two touchdown passes for the third consecutive game against the Houston Texans, tying a franchise record established by Don Hutson in 1943. On December 16, against the Chicago Bears, Jones had three touchdown catches in a game for the first time in his career. He also started both of Green Bay's games in the 2012–13 NFL Playoffs. In the Packers Wild Card playoff victory against the Minnesota Vikings, Jones posted 4 receptions for 51 yards. The following week, Jones had 4 catches, 87 yards and 1 touchdown in the Packers Divisional Round playoff loss to the San Francisco 49ers.

In 2013, after the departure of Jennings and Driver during the off season, Jones started in 14 games. With 59 receptions and 3 touchdowns, Jones had a then career high 817 receiving yards and career long 83-yard reception.

=== Oakland Raiders ===
On March 17, 2014, Jones signed a three-year deal with the Oakland Raiders. On November 20, Jones had the game-winning touchdown catch against the Kansas City Chiefs, winning the game for the Raiders, and ending their 16-game losing streak. In his single season with the Raiders he led them in catches (73) and receiving touchdowns (6). The Raiders released Jones on May 5, 2015, after the 2015 NFL draft and the selection of Amari Cooper along with the signing of Michael Crabtree from the San Francisco 49ers.

=== New York Giants ===
On July 30, 2015, Jones signed a one-year deal with the New York Giants. He was released by the Giants on September 5, 2015.

=== Green Bay Packers (second stint) ===
On September 6, 2015, a day after being released by the Giants, Jones agreed to a one-year deal to return to the Packers. Jones started the 2015 season with two receiving touchdowns against the Chicago Bears in Week 1, a 31–23 victory. In Week 3, against the Kansas City Chiefs, he had seven receptions for 139 yards and a touchdown in the 38–28 victory.

On November 22, 2015, Jones became an Internet sensation after wearing a green hooded sweatshirt underneath his jersey during a 34-degree game against the Minnesota Vikings at TCF Bank Stadium in Minneapolis. On June 9, 2016, it was reported by multiple sources that the NFL had added a rule for its rulebook in 2016, banning players from having their hooded sweatshirts over their shoulderpads, as it blocks the nameplate of the player's jersey. This will apply as a uniform violation and did not require a vote amongst team owners.

For the second year in a row, he led his team in receiving touchdowns (8), while also leading the Packers in receiving yards (890).

=== San Diego Chargers ===
Jones signed a one-year contract with the San Diego Chargers on August 2, 2016. On August 29, 2016, he was released by the Chargers.

=== Retirement ===
On September 6, 2017, Jones announced his retirement from the NFL.

== NFL career statistics ==
=== Regular season ===
Year	Team	Games		Receiving				
Year	Team	GP	GS	Rec	Yds	Avg	Lng	TD
2007	GB	16	9	47	676	14.4	79	2
2008	GB	10	2	20	274	13.7	46	1
2009	GB	16	3	32	440	13.8	74	5
2010	GB	16	3	50	679	13.6	66	5
2011	GB	16	0	38	635	16.7	70	7
2012	GB	16	16	64	784	12.3	49	14
2013	GB	14	14	59	817	13.8	83	3
2014	OAK	16	10	73	666	9.1	42	6
2015	GB	16	15	50	890	17.8	65	8
Total		136	72	433	5,861	13.5	83	51

=== Postseason ===
Year	Team	Games		Receiving				
Year	Team	GP	GS	Rec	Yds	Avg	Lng	TD
2007	GB	2	0	3	42	14.0	31	0
2009	GB	1	0	3	50	16.7	30	1
2010	GB	4	1	11	144	13.1	34	2
2011	GB	1	0	1	16	16.0	16	0
2012	GB	2	2	8	138	17.2	44	1
2013	GB	1	1	2	20	10.0	11	0
2015	GB	2	2	7	81	11.6	34	0
Total		13	6	35	491	14.0	44	4

== Personal life ==
In 2014, after signing with the Oakland Raiders, Jones and his family moved to San Ramon, California. James Jones is married to Tamika, whom James met while they were freshmen at San Jose State. He has a charitable organization, Love Jones 4 Kids, which provides financial support to homeless shelters.
