= NFL Top 10 =

Documentary TV series

NFL Top 10 was a documentary program produced by NFL Films for airing on the NFL Network. The host and narrator is Derrin Horton.

The program counts down 10 items directly related to the players, coaches, and events of the National Football League. Throughout segments on each selection, a wide variety of personalities weigh in on the list. They include former and current NFL players, coaches, national and local sports analysts, and journalists, among others. In addition, multiple celebrity guests have appeared on the show, such as David Copperfield, Richard Simmons, and the Sklar Brothers. Reruns show on weekdays, while new episodes air on Friday nights. It also fills time in markets on an alternate feed where game coverage (usually in the pre-season) is blacked out in deference to a local broadcast station's coverage of that game. The last episode aired January 8, 2019.

The show on NFL Network featuring narration and commentary from analysts, players, coaches, and sportswriters has unofficially ended in favor of compilation videos uploaded on the NFL YouTube account. For example, in February 2024, the NFL released "NFL Top 10" videos to recap the 2023 season.

== Episodes ==
No.	Title	Original release date
1	"Draft Trades"	April 5, 2007
The most memorable trades made on draft day. Examples: Eli Manning/Philip Rivers Giants/Chargers Trade, Michael Vick to the Falcons, LaDainian Tomlinson to the Chargers, Colts send Marshall Faulk to the Rams for a 2nd & 5th Round pick
2	"Draft Steals"	April 11, 2007
Players drafted in the later rounds of the draft that were very talented. Examples: Joe Montana, Larry Wilson, and Shannon Sharpe
3	"Draft Classes"	April 18, 2007
The best groups of players selected by one team in one draft. Example: the 1974 Pittsburgh Steelers, the 1958 Green Bay Packers and the 1995 Tampa Bay Buccaneers.
4	"Draft Busts"	April 25, 2007
Players that never lived up to the draft hype. Examples: Houston Cougars quarterbacks (Andre Ware/David Klingler), Brian Bosworth, Art Schlichter, Tony Mandarich, and Ryan Leaf
5	"Mobile Quarterbacks"	May 23, 2007
The best quarterbacks known for scrambling out of the pocket. Examples: Randall Cunningham, Michael Vick, and Fran Tarkenton
6	"One Shot Wonders"	May 30, 2007
Players whose NFL careers were basically one good season, one game, or even one play. Examples: Mike Jones, Ickey Woods, Tommy Maddox, and Greg Cook
7	"Bad Weather Games"	June 6, 2007
The most exciting games with bad weather. Example: Freezer Bowl, the Sneakers Game, and the Ice Bowl
8	"Feuds"	June 13, 2007
The biggest feuds between players and coaches, coaches and the media, etc. Examples: Jerry Glanville vs. the AFC Central, Joe Montana vs. Steve Young, and the AFL vs. the NFL
9	"Elusive Runners"	June 20, 2007
Players that were hard to tackle because of their quickness. Examples: Dickie Post, Willie Galimore, and Barry Sanders
10	"Single Season Performances*"	June 27, 2007
The best performances in a single season. Example: Eric Dickerson's 2,000-yard season in 1984
11	"Linebacking Corps"	July 4, 2007
The best groups of linebackers ever to play for the same team. Example: New Orleans' Dome Patrol, Pittsburgh Steelers of the 1970s and Oakland Raiders of the early 1980s.
12	"Most Versatile Players"	July 11, 2007
The best players that played multiple positions. Examples: Mike Vrabel, Chuck Bednarik and Deion Sanders
13	"Pass Rushers"	July 18, 2007
The best players at rushing the quarterback. Examples: Bruce Smith, Deacon Jones, and Mark Gastineau
14	"Passing Combinations"	July 25, 2007
The best quarterback/receiver combinations in NFL history. Example: Jim Kelly to Andre Reed, Joe Montana / Steve Young to Jerry Rice, and Peyton Manning to Marvin Harrison.
15	"Foul-Ups"	August 1, 2007
Mistakes made by players, officials, etc. Examples: Jim Marshall's wrong way run, Garo Yepremian's gaffe in Super Bowl VII and Leon Lett in both Super Bowl XXVII and Thanksgiving Day in 1993
16	"Opening Days"	September 8, 2007
The best moments to ever come out of Week 1. Examples: Dan Marino's 1994 victory over the Patriots and Garrison Hearst's touchdown run in overtime in 1998 over the Jets
17	"Team Nicknames"	September 15, 2007
The best team nicknames in NFL history. Example: America's Team, Air Coryell and The Greatest Show On Turf
18	"Records That Will Never Be Broken*"	September 22, 2007
The hardest records to break in the NFL. Examples: Otto Graham's ten consecutive championship runs and Tom Landry's 29 seasons as Dallas Cowboys coach
19	"Worst Teams"	September 29, 2007
The worst teams in NFL history. Examples: 1990 New England Patriots, 1989 Dallas Cowboys, and 1976 Tampa Bay Buccaneers.
20	"Power Backs"	November 2, 2007
Running backs that used power to break tackles. Examples: Marshawn Lynch, John Riggins, and Earl Campbell
21	"Coaches Who Belonged In College"	April 15, 2008
Successful college coaches who were dismal in the NFL. Examples: Bobby Petrino, Dick MacPherson, and Dennis Erickson.
22	"Football Factories"	April 22, 2008
The top ten colleges to produce NFL talent. Examples: USC, Michigan, Ohio State and Miami
23	"Team Turnarounds"	April 29, 2008
The most incredible single season turnarounds. Examples: 1999 Indianapolis Colts and 1999 Rams
24	"Clutch Quarterbacks"	May 6, 2008
The best quarterbacks in the big game. Examples: Joe Montana, Bart Starr
25	"Things That Changed The Game"	May 13, 2008
The biggest innovations in football. Examples: Instant replay, Astroturf, NFL Films and AFL-NFL War
26	"Receiving Corps"	May 20, 2008
The best groups of receivers in NFL history. Example: The "Marks Brothers" (Mark Duper and Mark Clayton) of the Miami Dolphins and "The Posse" (Art Monk, Gary Clark and Ricky Sanders) of the Washington Redskins.
27	"Motivational Coaches"	May 27, 2008
The most motivational coaches in NFL history. Examples: Bill Parcells, Dick Vermeil, and Vince Lombardi
28	"Controversial Calls"	June 3, 2008
The most controversial calls in NFL history. Examples: Super Bowl XL, Music City Miracle and the Tuck Rule. The episode was subsequently updated: the Seattle-Green Bay "Fail Mary" Game replaced the Bert Emanuel catch as number 5 on the list.
29	"Quarterback Controversies"	June 10, 2008
The biggest quarterback controversies in NFL history. Examples: Drew Brees vs. Philip Rivers, and Joe Montana vs. Steve Young
30	"Tight Ends"	June 17, 2008
The best tight ends in NFL history. Examples: Shannon Sharpe, Tony Gonzalez, John Mackey and Kellen Winslow.
31	"Super Bowl Performances"	June 24, 2008
Greatest Moments ever in a Super Bowl. Examples: Adam Vinatieri's game-winning field goals and Doug Williams' 4 TD passes in Super Bowl XXII second quarter.
32	"Cornerback Tandems"	July 8, 2008
Best pairs of cornerbacks in NFL history. Examples: Deion Sanders and Anyone, Hanford Dixon and Frank Minnifield, Lester Hayes and Mike Haynes.
33	"Characters"	July 15, 2008
The most outspoken football personalities. Examples: Brett Favre, Randy Moss and Terrell Owens
34	"Players Not In The Hall Of Fame"	July 29, 2008
The best football players who are not in the Pro Football Hall of Fame. Example: Jim Marshall, Jerry Kramer, Steve Tasker.
35	"Most Feared Tacklers"	August 5, 2008
The most feared tacklers in NFL history. Examples: Dick Butkus, Jack Lambert, Night Train Lane, Ray Lewis, and Deacon Jones
36	"Home Field Advantages"	September 6, 2008
The hardest places to play as the visiting team. Examples: Three Rivers Stadium, Veterans Stadium, and Qwest Field
37	"Biggest Upsets"	September 13, 2008
The most surprising upset wins. Examples: Super Bowl III and the Jaguars 30-27 win over the Denver Broncos in the 1996 Playoffs
38	"Gutsiest Performances"	September 20, 2008
Players who played games through injury. Example: Dan Pastorini playing with cracked ribs in 1978 and Jack Youngblood playing with a broken leg in the Super Bowl.
39	"Football Families"	September 27, 2008
The first families in football. Example: Hasselbeck, Rooney, Manning. It's all in the family.
40	"Comebacks"	October 4, 2008
The most impressive comeback victories. Examples: 2002 49ers playoff comeback vs. the Giants, Chicago's second half comeback from a 20-point deficit against the Cardinals and Buffalo's 1992 rally against the Oilers
41	"Rookie Seasons"	April 29, 2009
The best seasons rookies have ever had. Examples: Gale Sayers in 1965, Curt Warner in 1983, and Randy Moss in 1998
42	"Football Myths"	May 8, 2009
Long-standing beliefs, true or false, about the NFL and pro football. Example: Establishing the run, not losing a starting job to injury, and punting instead of converting on fourth down
43	"Follies"	May 15, 2009
The comedic side of the NFL . Examples: Blown snaps, coaches post-game rants (notably those of Jim E. Mora and Denny Green) and special teams mishaps
44	"Backfield Tandems"	May 22, 2009
The best pairs of running backs ever to play on the same team. Examples: Earnest Byner and Kevin Mack, Alan Ameche and Lenny Moore, Roger Craig and Tom Rathman, and Jim Taylor and Paul Hornung.
45	"Dallas Cowboys"	May 29, 2009
The ten most famous members of the Cowboys. Examples: Michael Irvin, Emmitt Smith, and Tom Landry
46	"Games With Names"	June 5, 2009
The best games to have been given a nickname. Examples: The Comeback, The Ice Bowl, and The Dolphins-Raiders "Sea Of Hands" Game.
47	"Innovations"	June 12, 2009
Changes in game strategy. Examples: The zone blitz, 3–4 defense, run and shoot offense, shotgun formation, no-huddle offense, and West Coast offense.
48	"Defenses"	June 19, 2009
The best defenses in NFL history. Examples: The 2013 Seahawks, the 1985 Bears, the 2000 Ravens and the Pittsburgh Steelers of the 1970s
49	"Return Aces"	June 26, 2009
Kick and punt return specialists. Examples: Brian Mitchell, Devin Hester, and Gale Sayers
50	"Coaches Who Never Won a Championship"	July 3, 2009
The best coaches who never won a Super Bowl or NFL Championship. Examples: Bud Grant, Jeff Fisher, Marv Levy, Marty Schottenheimer and George Allen
51	"Gunslingers"	July 10, 2009
Quarterbacks who displayed skill in long passes, accurate throws, and improvisation. Examples: Dan Marino, Brett Favre and Warren Moon
52	"Meltdowns"	July 17, 2009
Games or people who have collapsed under pressure. Examples: Brett Favre's playoff failures, the 2006 Cardinals collapse to the Bears and Dennis Green's famous postgame rant, the controversial career of kicker Mike Vanderjagt, and Jim Mora's infamous 2001 postgame rant following a 40-21 loss to the 49ers.
53	"Greatest Hands"	July 24, 2009
Players who have been the most reliable in catching passes. Examples: Raymond Berry and Jerry Rice.
54	"Snakebit Franchises"	July 31, 2009
Teams who have been cursed throughout the years. Examples: the Houston Oilers/Tennessee Oilers/Tennessee Titans, the New York Jets, the Philadelphia Eagles, the New Orleans Saints, the Detroit Lions and the Cleveland Browns.
55	"Traditions"	September 19, 2009
The best NFL traditions and customs that have stood the test of time. Examples: Tailgating and Super Bowl Sunday.
56	"Undrafted Players"	April 21, 2010
The best players who made the NFL despite not being drafted. Examples: Warren Moon, Adam Vinatieri, and Kurt Warner
57	"Fans Choice"	May 31, 2010
The best Top 10 episodes as voted on by viewers on NFL.com
58	"Things We Loved About The 2000s (decade)"	September 10, 2010
Ten most fascinating aspects of the 2000s (decade). Examples: Brett Favre's serial indecision on retirement, 74 coaching changes during the decade, the Tom Brady–Peyton Manning rivalry, and flamboyant wide receivers Terrell Owens, Steve Smith, and Chad Johnson
59	"Overtime Finishes"	September 18, 2010
The most famous overtime finishes in NFL history, including the "Ghost to the Post", back-to-back defensive touchdowns in overtime by the 2001 Bears, the "Greatest Game Ever Played", and the Green Bay Packers at Arizona Cardinals in the 2009 NFC Wildcard Playoff Round
60	"Gutsiest Calls"	September 25, 2010
Ten riskiest calls by coaches. Examples: Bill Belichick's 4th and 2 call versus Indianapolis, Red Right 88, and the playoff gambles of Bill Parcells.
61	"Jersey Numbers"	October 2, 2010
The ten most famous and recognizable jersey numbers. Examples: 99 for Mark Gastineau, Warren Sapp and Jason Taylor, 20 for Barry Sanders and Ed Reed, 80 for Jerry Rice and Steve Largent, and 7 for John Elway, Joe Theismann and Ben Roethlisberger
62	"Backup Quarterbacks"	October 9, 2010
The ten most famous quarterbacks that started as backups. Examples: Trent Dilfer for the Ravens and Kurt Warner for the Rams.
63	"Shortest Players"	October 16, 2010
The ten most famous NFL players considered short (5'9" or under). Examples: Quarterback Doug Flutie and running back Maurice Jones-Drew.
64	"Left-Handed Quarterbacks"	October 23, 2010
Famous left-handed signal callers from the NFL. Examples: Michael Vick, Tim Tebow, Ken Stabler, and Steve Young
65	"Raiders"	October 30, 2010
The ten most famous members of the Oakland Raiders. Examples: Ken Stabler, Fred Biletnikoff, and Howie Long
66	"Quarterbacks of the 1980s"	November 6, 2010
The best quarterbacks from the 1980s. Examples: Dan Marino, John Elway and Joe Montana.
67	"Uniforms"	November 12, 2010
Top uniform designs from the NFL. Examples: the 49ers of the 1980s and throwback jerseys.
68	"Revenge Games"	November 20, 2010
The ten most disputed and heated revenge games. Examples: Joe Montana against the 49ers, Brett Favre against the Green Bay Packers in 2009.
69	"Steelers"	December 24, 2010
The ten most famous members of the Pittsburgh Steelers. Examples: Joe Greene, Jack Lambert, and Terry Bradshaw.
70	"Super Bowls"	February 3, 2011
The ten best Super Bowls of all time. Examples: Super Bowl III, Super Bowl XXXVIII, and Super Bowl XLII.
71	"Teams That Didn't win the Super Bowl"	February 4, 2011
Top teams that either lost the Super Bowl or never made it there. Examples: 2007 Patriots, 1998 Minnesota Vikings and the 2001 St. Louis Rams
72	"Worst Free Agent Signings"	April 28, 2011
Free agent signings that turn out to make things worse than better. Examples: Jeff Garcia to the Browns, Bruce Smith, Dana Stubblefield to Redskins, David Boston signing with the Chargers, and Emmitt Smith signing with the Arizona Cardinals.
73	"Things We Miss About Football"	July 31, 2011
Cherished items and memories of the NFL's past. Examples: player nicknames, coaches who wear suits and ties (ex: Tom Landry and Vince Lombardi), and playing on natural grass instead of Astroturf or Field Turf.
74	"Football Divas"	August 1, 2011
Players and others in the NFL who have been flashy or have caused controversy for strong portions of their careers. Examples: Tom Brady, Joe Namath, Chad Johnson, Terrell Owens, and Randy Moss.
75	"End Zone Celebrations"	September 10, 2011
Some of the wackiest and most recognizable TD celebrations. Examples: Celebrations from Icky Woods or Terrell Owens; acting as counterpoint in the segment is Barry Sanders and his habit of not celebrating a touchdown.
76	"Green Bay Packers"	September 17, 2011
The most famous Packer players. Examples: Brett Favre, Bart Starr, and Paul Hornung.
77	"Things We Love About the Giants – Eagles Rivalry"	September 24, 2011
Most memorable moments of the rivalry. Examples: Miracle at the Meadowlands 1 and 2.
78	"Toughest Acts to Follow"	October 1, 2011
The most difficult jobs to pull off, coming right after a legend. Examples: Bill Cowher coming in after Chuck Noll, Aaron Rodgers replacing Brett Favre, and Leroy Kelly replacing Jim Brown.
79	"Quarterbacks of the 1990s"	October 8, 2011
The most famous QBs of the 1990s. Examples: Brett Favre, Warren Moon, Drew Bledsoe, Troy Aikman, and Steve Young
80	"Football Moves"	October 15, 2011
The greatest moves any NFL player can make. Examples: the Stiff Arm, Pump Fake, the Cut Block, and the Play Action Pass.
81	"Brett Favre Games"	October 22, 2011
The most memorable moments and games of Brett Favre's career. Examples: His first game as a Packer, the 2009 NFC Championship, his Super Bowl victory, and the 2003 game against the Oakland Raiders.
82	"Football Voices"	November 5, 2011
The most memorable game and TV commentators. Examples: Howard Cosell, Merrill Reese, Al Michaels, Bill King, and Myron Cope.
83	"Thanksgiving Moments"	November 24, 2011
The most memorable moments from Thanksgiving games. Examples: The Bounty Bowl in 1989, the disputed Phil Luckett coin toss in 1998, The Butt fumble, and the Leon Lett blunder in 1993.
84	"Passing Seasons"	December 3, 2011
The most successful passing seasons by NFL QBs. Examples: Bert Jones in 1976, and Dan Marino in 1984.
85	"Quarterback Duels"	December 31, 2011
The best and high scoring games with the focus on the quarterbacks involved. Examples: Aaron Rodgers vs Kurt Warner in the 2009 playoffs, Joe Namath vs. Johnny Unitas in 1972, and Dan Marino vs. Drew Bledsoe in 1994 and Ken O'Brien in 1986.
86	"Players that Never Played in a Super Bowl"	January 30, 2012
The best players that never played in a Super Bowl. Examples: Sterling Sharpe, Cris Carter, or Randall Cunningham.
87	"Heisman Winners in the NFL"	April 23, 2012
The best Heisman Trophy winners that played and achieved in the NFL. Examples: Barry Sanders, Paul Hornung, and Marcus Allen.
88	"Things We Loved About The 80s (decade)"	September 7, 2012
Ten most fascinating aspects of the 1980s (decade). Examples: The various games with names, West Coast Offense, etc..
89	"Things We Love About Tebow"	September 14, 2012
A list of aspects that people love about Tim Tebow. Examples: Tebowing, his ability to run the Read Option and his status as an underdog.
90	"Worst Collapses"	September 21, 2012
A list of teams that collapsed during an NFL season missing the playoffs after a great start. Examples: 2008 Dallas Cowboys, 2003 Minnesota Vikings and 1994 Philadelphia Eagles.
91	"Trick Plays"	September 28, 2012
A list of most common and successful trick plays in the game. Examples: Reverses, fake field-goals and fake spikes.
92	"Running-Backs of the 1980s"	October 5, 2012
The most famous RBs of the 1980s. Examples: Marcus Allen, John Riggins and Walter Payton.
93	"Joe Montana Games"	October 19, 2012
The most memorable Joe Montana games. Examples: The Catch game, his victory over the 49ers with Kansas City and the comeback against the Saints in the 1980 season.
94	"Quarterbacks of the 1970s"	November 2, 2012
The best quarterbacks from the 1970s. Examples: Terry Bradshaw, Ken Stabler and Ken Anderson.
95	"Underrated Players"	November 9, 2012
Most underrated players in NFL history. Examples: Len Dawson, Brian Westbrook and Ken Anderson.
96	"Rivalries"	November 16, 2012
A list of the biggest rivalries between NFL clubs. Examples: Bears–Packers, Ravens–Steelers, and Colts–Patriots.
97	"Draft Day Moments"	April 24, 2013
Most memorable moments from the NFL Draft day. Examples: New York Jets fans booing their own team's picks, Vernon Davis crying in the arms of his mother, and Al Davis's unexpected draft picks.
98	"Rushing Seasons"	August 18, 2013
The best rushing seasons in NFL history, including playoff yardage. Examples: Terrell Davis in 1998, and Eric Dickerson in 1984.
99	"Players who Wore #12"	September 14, 2013
The best football players who wore number 12 on their shirt. Examples: Aaron Rodgers, Jim Kelly, Roger Staubach.
100	"49ers"	September 28, 2013
The best football players who played for the San Francisco 49ers. Examples: Joe Montana, Jerry Rice, Steve Young.
101	"Ageless Wonders"	October 5, 2013
The most enduring players in league history. Examples: George Blanda, Brett Favre, and Tony Gonzalez.
102	"Players You Love to Hate"	October 12, 2013
The easiest players to hate in the NFL. Examples: Tom Brady, Terrell Owens, Boomer Esiason, and Brett Favre.
103	"Football Curses"	November 3, 2013
The most known football-related curses in the NFL. Examples: The Madden Curse, the Curse of Bobby Layne and Joe Namath's deal with the devil.
104	"Football Steves"	November 17, 2013
The best players with the first name Steve. Examples: Steve Largent, Steve Tasker, Steve McNair, and Steve Young. The episode was created as an homage to NFL Films' Steve Sabol following his passing, and includes clips of Sabol doing interviews, working a camera, and engaging in humorous bits such as visually imitating a narration by John Facenda.
105	"Coaches of the 80's"	December 14, 2013
The best football coaches from the 1980's decade. Examples: Joe Gibbs, Bill Parcells and Bill Walsh.
106	"Most Fun Teams Ever"	December 21, 2013
The teams that were the most fun to watch that while they didn't win any championships, they became memorable. Examples: the 1978 Oilers, 2011 Broncos, and 1989 Packers.
107	"Trending Topics of 2013"	August 4, 2014
The most talked about topics and stories about the 2013 season. Examples: Robert Griffin III's recovery from injury, Dez Bryant rants and sound bites, and the loudest stadium world record feud.
108	"Fantasy Seasons"	September 3, 2014
A list of the best single seasons by players based on their fantasy points statistics. Examples: Peyton Manning in 2013, Marshall Faulk in 2000, LaDainian Tomlinson in 2006.
109	"Brady vs. Manning Games"	October 28, 2014
The best games between Tom Brady and Peyton Manning. Examples: The 4th and 2 game, the Undefeated Bowl, and the 2007 AFC Championship Game
110	"Quarterback Teases"	November 11, 2014
A list of quarterbacks that looked good in the beginning but turned out to be big disappointments. Examples: Mark Sanchez, Elvis Grbac, Jeff George.
111	"Big Guys"	December 2, 2014
A list of players who best exemplify the "Big Guy" character. Examples: Nate Newton, Jerome Bettis, Sebastian Janikowski.
112	"Devastating Losses"	September 18, 2015
A list of games that ended with a devastating, unexpected loss for one of the teams. Examples: Brett Favre's playoff late-game interceptions, The Tuck Rule game, The Music City Miracle game.
113	"New York Giants"	September 25, 2015
The ten most famous members of the New York Giants. Examples: Tiki Barber, Michael Strahan, Eli Manning.
114	"Football Dynasties"	October 2, 2015
Ten of the most dominant football dynasties that existed in the NFL. Examples: Green Bay Packers in the 60s, San Francisco 49ers in the 80s, Dallas Cowboys in the 90s.
115	"Fastest Players"	October 16, 2015
Ten of the fastest players in NFL history. Examples: Joey Galloway, Deion Sanders, Michael Vick.
116	"Super Bowl Plays"	October 23, 2015
The best known plays in Super Bowl history. Examples: The David Tyree catch, John Elway's run and helicopter jump, John Riggins run on 4th and 1, and Julian Edelman's catch vs. the Falcons.
117	"Peyton Manning Games"	September 7, 2016
The most notable games of Peyton Manning's career. Examples: 2003 comeback win over the Tampa Bay Buccaneers.
118	"New England Patriots"	September 23, 2016
The ten most famous members of the New England Patriots. Examples: Tom Brady, John Hannah, Andre Tippett, and Adam Vinatieri.
119	"Wide Receivers of the 2000s"	September 30, 2016
The best receivers that played in the 2000s decade. Examples: Marvin Harrison, Terrell Owens, and Larry Fitzgerald.
120	"Playoff Performances"	October 7, 2016
The best performances by players in the NFL Playoffs. Examples: Colin Kaepernick runs over the Packers in 2012, Peyton Manning finally beats Tom Brady in 2006, Larry Fitzgerald in 2015, and Kellen Winslow performance against the Miami Dolphins.
121	"Worst Plays"	October 14, 2016
The worst plays in NFL history, with catastrophic consequences. Examples: The Jets' "Butt Fumble", Seattle passing the ball in the Super Bowl instead of giving it to Marshawn Lynch, and Jim Marshall running the wrong way.
122	"Quarterbacks"	October 21, 2016
The best signal-callers in NFL history. Examples: Brett Favre, Tom Brady, and Joe Montana
123	"Playoff Finishes"	October 28, 2016
The playoff games with the best finishes in NFL history. Examples: The Music City Miracle game, Tim Tebow stuns the Steelers in 2012, and Peyton Manning finally beating Tom Brady in 2006.
124	"Player Comebacks"	November 4, 2016
The players with the best performances after coming back from injury or other problems. Eric Berry returning from cancer in 2015, Adrian Peterson gaining over 2,000 yards after a torn ACL, and Michael Vick returning to the NFL after prison.
125	"Mic'd Up Guys"	November 18, 2016
The players and coaches with the best sound bytes recorded by NFL Films. Examples: Matthew Stafford, Brett Favre, and Randy Moss. The episode deliberately ends in controversy over not including Hank Stram.
126	"Greatest Catches"	November 25, 2016
The best catches in NFL games. Examples: The Immaculate Reception, Randy Moss' one-handed catch on Darrelle Revis, and Antonio Freeman's "He Did What" catch on Monday Night Football.
127	"Greatest Interceptions"	December 9, 2016
The most memorable interceptions of all time. Examples: Malcolm Butler in Super Bowl XLIX, Willie Brown in Super Bowl XI, and Tracy Porter in Super Bowl XLIV.
128	"Greatest In-Season Trades"	December 16, 2016
The in-season trades that panned out with the best results, for one team, or both. Examples: Detroit Lions trade Bobby Layne to the Steelers, the Bills trade Marshawn Lynch to the Seahawks, and the Rams trade Eric Dickerson to the Colts.
129	"Tom Brady Games"	September 6, 2017
The most notable games of Tom Brady's career. Examples: Super Bowl LI, Super Bowl XLIX, The Tuck Rule game.
130	"Hail Marys"	October 27, 2017
The most notable and remembered Hail Mary passes in the history of the NFL. Examples: Aaron Rodgers' 2 Hail Mary passes in the same game, Roger Staubach to Drew Pearson in the 1975 NFL playoff game.
131	"Clutch Drives"	November 3, 2017
The most clutch drives that have helped teams tie or win games. Examples: The Drive, the Patriots' drive to win Super Bowl XXXVI, the drive to win the Ice Bowl.
132	"Career Finales"	November 10, 2017
The most memorable last seasons that have ended a player's career. Examples: Kurt Warner, Barry Sanders, Don Hutson
133	"Amazing Runs"	November 17, 2017
The most memorable runs in NFL history. Examples: Marcus Allen in Super Bowl XVIII, John Riggins in Super Bowl XVII, Beast Quake.
134	"Greatest Teams"	December 1, 2017
The most complete and dominating teams in NFL history. Examples: '92 Cowboys, '62 Packers, '07 Patriots.
135	"High Powered Offenses"	December 8, 2017
The 10 best NFL offenses who knew how to put on a show... and points. Examples: '07 Patriots, '98 Vikings, '83 Redskins.
136	"Denver Broncos"	December 15, 2017
The most famous Broncos players. Examples: John Elway, Terrell Davis, and Shannon Sharpe.
137	"What If's"	December 22, 2017
Imagine what would happen if things had gone differently during ten big moments in NFL history. Examples: What if Bo Jackson never got injured? What if Colts never release Peyton Manning? What if there was no AFL-NFL merger?.
138	"Forgotten Plays"	December 29, 2017
Important plays in NFL history that were overshadowed by bigger plays in the same game. Examples: The Bus fumbles and Big Ben tackles the opposing player at the last moment, Dan Reeves' pass in the Ice Bowl, Ricky Proehl's game-tying TDs in two different Super Bowls.
139	"End Zone Celebrations of 2017"	September 7, 2018
The most funny and original end zone celebrations of 2017, after the NFL re-allowed end zone celebrations. Examples: Seahawks riverdance, Lions Rockettes dance, Chiefs potato sack race.
140	"Bitter Ending (Devastating Departures)"	September 24, 2018
The most notable moments regarding players or coaches leaving teams. Examples: Steve Smith leaving the Panthers, Cowboys firing Tom Landry, Browns leave Cleveland to become the Ravens.
141	"Mount Rushmores"	October 2, 2018
The best quartet of players and coaches from a franchise. Examples: The Giants: Lawrence Taylor, Bill Parcells, Michael Strahan, and Frank Gifford.
142	"Goal Line Stands"	October 12, 2018
The goal line stands in NFL history. Examples: 49ers stuff Eagles six times in 2001, week 5; 49ers stop Bengals in Super Bowl XVI; Cowboys stop Bills in Super Bowl XXVII.
143	"Eagles"	October 19, 2018
Best Eagles players of all time. Examples: Brian Dawkins, Donovan McNabb, and Harold Carmichael.
144	"Greatest Games of All Time"	November 6, 2018
Best NFL games of all times. Examples: The Drive, Super Bowl XLIX, the Ice Bowl.
145	"Safeties"	November 13, 2018
Best players who played the free and strong safety positions in NFL history. Examples: Brian Dawkins, Ed Reed, Steve Atwater.
146	"Quarterback-Coach Duos"	November 20, 2018
Best quarterback and coach duos that have achieved the most results in the NFL. Examples: Dungy-Manning, Shula-Marino, Brown-Graham.
147	"Draft Years"	December 4, 2018
The best draft classes organized by years, and not by team and year, as in a previous show. Examples: Draft classes of 1996, 2007, and 1961.
148	"HBCU Players"	December 11, 2018
Best players who were drafted from historically black colleges and universities. Examples: Michael Strahan, Jackie Slater, Walter Payton.
149	"Human Highlight Reel"	December 18, 2018
A list with the players that have the best highlight reel. Examples: Barry Sanders, JJ Watt, Rob Gronkowski.
150	"Backup Quarterbacks"	January 8, 2019
The most reliable and most successful backup quarterbacks across NFL history. Examples: Frank Reich, Don Strock, Jim Plunkett.

=== Changes to the Lists ===
- Note: "Single Season Performances" was produced and aired before the 2007 season: it originally featured Devin Hester's rookie season of 6 returns for touchdowns and ended with Peyton Manning's season of 49 touchdown throws as the #1 season, but in 2008 it was updated, with Hester's rookie season replaced by his second season and Manning's 2004 season replaced by Tom Brady's 2007 season of 50 touchdown throws. In 2014 it was updated yet again with Peyton Manning's 55 touchdowns in 2013 voted #1.
- Note: "Worst Teams" was aired before the 2007 season; it originally ended with the 1976–77 Tampa Bay Buccaneers, losing 26 games over two seasons before the team's first win during the 1977 season. In 2009, it was updated and revised; the 2001 Panthers segment was eliminated and the Detroit Lions becoming the first team to finish 0–16 in a season became the segment's top choice. The 1-15 2007 Miami Dolphins season received mention in the show's "Best Of The Rest" segment.
- Note: "Players Not in the Hall of Fame" has been updated repeatedly. In 2014, the Andre Reed segment was replaced with Tim Brown and the Cris Carter segment was replaced with Charles Haley. Jerome Bettis, Brown and Haley were inducted into the Hall of Fame, so a new set of players had to replace them. Brown was replaced by Marvin Harrison, Bettis was replaced by Tiki Barber, Haley was replaced by Orlando Pace, and Jim Marshall moved up to the #2 spot. In 2016, Harrison, Pace, and Ken Stabler were inducted into the Hall of Fame, meaning the list was updated once again. Stabler was replaced by his 1970s Raiders teammate Cliff Branch, Harrison was replaced by Terrell Davis, and Pace was replaced by Tony Boselli. Since the last time the episode was aired, Davis (2017), Jerry Kramer (2018), Alex Karras (2020), Boselli (2022), and Branch (2022) have been inducted into the Hall of Fame, meaning that future re-airs will remain out-of-date.
- Note: "Return Aces" was updated in 2011 with the Eric Metcalf segment being replaced with Josh Cribbs.
- Note: "Left Handed Quarterbacks" was updated in 2012 with the Field segment being replaced with Tim Tebow.
- Note: "Records That Will Never Be Broken" was aired in 2011 and includes Johnny Unitas' 47 consecutive games with a touchdown; that record was broken in 2012 by Drew Brees and the episode has been updated as a result.
- Note: "Rookie Seasons" was updated in 2012 with the Best of the Rest segment featuring Cam Newton's 2011 season and the rookie seasons of Andrew Luck, Robert Griffin III and Russell Wilson in 2012. Then it was updated again when Odell Beckham Jr.'s rookie season in 2014 was added.
- Note: "Draft Busts" was updated in 2017 with mention of Lawrence Phillips committing suicide while serving a 31-year prison sentence. The list was originally updated in 2010 when JaMarcus Russell was added to the list.
- Note: "Opening Days" was updated in 2014 with Peyton Manning's 2013 opening day performance against the Baltimore Ravens.
- Note: "Defenses" was updated with the 2013 Seahawks replacing the Atlanta Falcons Grits Blitz at #5.
- Note: "Comebacks" was updated in 2014 with Andrew Luck's 28-point comeback vs. the Kansas City Chiefs in the 2013 playoffs, replacing the Lions 1957 playoff game win at #2. It was updated again in 2016 when NFL Network put the 2014 NFC Championship Game at #2. This led to a chain reaction that caused the Anthony Wright section from his 2003 comeback vs. the Seahawks to be cut out entirely. Super Bowl LI then replaced The Comeback as number one, relegating the 1992 game to number two.
- Note: "Overtime Finishes" was updated in 2015 with the Seattle Seahawks comeback in the 2014 NFC Championship Game over The Green Bay Packers at #5.
- Note: "Controversial Calls" was updated in 2016 with the Dez Bryant no-catch game in the 2014 playoffs against the Green Bay Packers replacing Bottle Gate at #9. The Burt Emmanuel catch in the 1999 NFC Championship was replaced by the Fail Mary at number five as well.
- Note: "Dallas Cowboys" was updated in 2016 with Randy White replacing Drew Pearson at #10, Tony Romo replacing Don Meredith at #9, and Jason Witten replacing Randy White at #8.
- Note: "Quarterback Duels" was updated; 2013's 51-48 Peyton Manning/Tony Romo shootout replaced 2009's Matthew Stafford/Brady Quinn game while Super Bowl LII was added.
- Note: “Playoff Finishes” was updated in 2018, with the 2013 NFC Championship Game being moved to a best of the rest segment, and being replaced by the Minneapolis Miracle.
- Note: "Tight Ends" was updated with Jackie Smith and Mark Bavaro being replaced by Jason Witten and Rob Gronkowski and Tony Gonzalez moving up to the #1 spot.
- Note: "Coaches Who Belonged In College" initially included Pete Carroll during his time at USC. His 2010 debut with the Seahawks was added into his segment in 2011, but after his Super Bowl XLVIII victory, the Carroll segment was replaced with Greg Schiano.
