= Hasselbach =

Hasselbach may refer to:

== Places ==
- Hasselbach, Altenkirchen, Rhineland-Palatinate, Germany
- Hasselbach, Rhein-Hunsrück, Rhineland-Palatinate, Germany

== Rivers ==
- Hasselbach (Dalke), North Rhine-Westphalia, Germany, tributary of the Dalke
- Hasselbach (Werre), North Rhine-Westphalia, Germany, tributary of the Werre
- Hasselbach (Dürre Holzminde), Lower Saxony, Germany, tributary of the Dürre Holzminde

== Other uses ==
- Hasselbach (surname)

== See also ==
- Hasselback potatoes
