= List of Savannah State Tigers in the NFL draft =

This is a list of Savannah State Tigers football players in the NFL draft.

== Key ==
B	Back	K	Kicker	NT	Nose tackle
C	Center	LB	Linebacker	FB	Fullback
DB	Defensive back	P	Punter	HB	Halfback
DE	Defensive end	QB	Quarterback	WR	Wide receiver
DT	Defensive tackle	RB	Running back	G	Guard
E	End	T	Offensive tackle	TE	Tight end

= Pro Bowler
= Hall of Famer

== Selections ==
Year	Round	Pick	Overall	Player	Team	Position
1981	10	4	192	Ken Dawson	Seattle Seahawks	RB
1990	7	27	192	Shannon Sharpe	Denver Broncos	TE
