= The Volume =

Sports media company

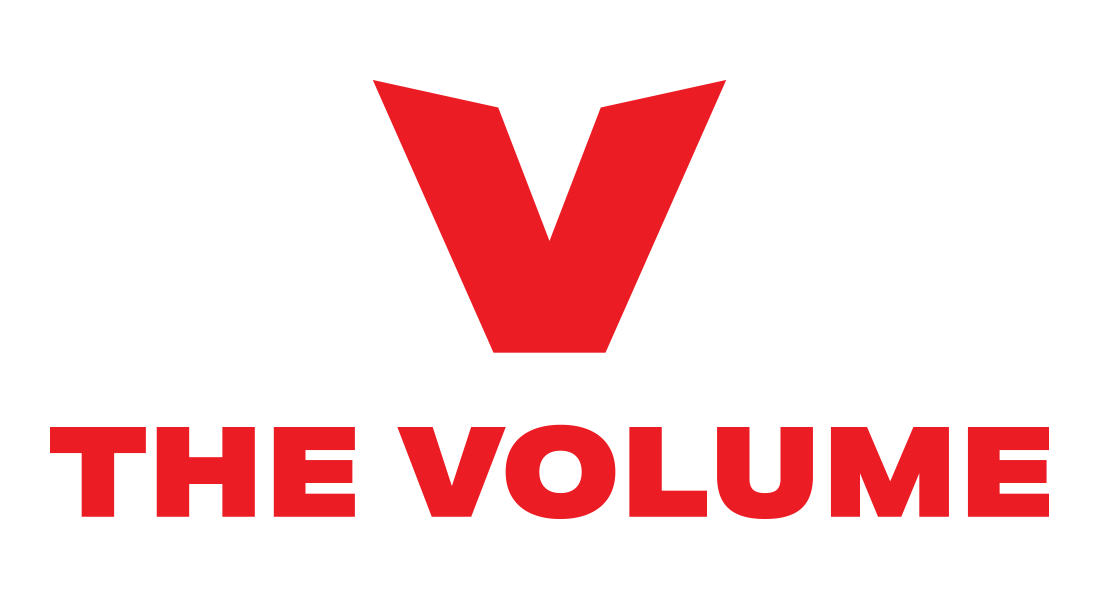
- Website type: Sports
- Owner: Colin Cowherd
- Founder: Colin Cowherd
- Key people: Logan Swaim (Head of content)
- Website: www.thevolume.com
- Commercial: Yes
- Launched: February 1, 2021; 5 years ago

The Volume is a sports media company founded by Colin Cowherd. The network currently hosts podcasts and produces video content for YouTube, TikTok, Instagram, Facebook and other platforms. It produces content around sporting events.

== History ==
Cowherd founded the company to both produce his own content and host other commentators. At its launch, Cowherd partnered with iHeartRadio to sell the company's advertising space, with fantasy sports company FanDuel as its gambling partner and presenting sponsor.

The Volume was launched on February 1, 2021, with its flagship program, The Colin Cowherd Podcast, on which Cowherd discusses sports stories and interviews guests.

In March 2021, The Volume entered into a partnership with the Action Network to produce a slate of sports gambling podcasts.

Sports media executive Logan Swaim joined the company as head of content in May 2021. In 2022, several executives from companies such as ESPN, Fox Sports 1, Overtime and Activision Blizzard joined the company. These included Andrew Samson, a former director of content for the XFL, who became executive producer of The Colin Cowherd Podcast.

The network partnered with Wave Sports + Entertainment to provide joint coverage of the 2022 NBA Finals.

The Volume had 1.2 million subscribers, and its podcasts averaged a combined total of 40 million downloads per month in 2022.

In September 2023, The Volume announced a multi-year partnership with DraftKings, in which the sportsbook would become the presenting sponsor of all of The Volume's podcast and video content.

== Content ==
The Volume hosts 21 podcasts and digital shows by athletes and commentators, including The Draymond Green Show, hosted by NBA player Draymond Green. The Draymond Green Show launched successfully, growing to 500,000 monthly downloads in February 2022. By June 2022, it was the 11th highest ranked show on iTunes. It has been noted for Green's unfiltered commentary and personal analysis, which Nicholas Quah of Vulture opined was more interesting than traditional sports media. In March 2023, The Draymond Green Show won the iHeart Media Podcast Award for Best Sports Podcast.

In August 2022, Richard Sherman moved his podcast from Pro Football Focus to The Volume.

The network has been noted for being one of the first major sports media platforms to host college football players after the National Collegiate Athletic Association made it possible for them to monetize their own brands. In its first year, The Volume launched Inside the Garage, a show that originated from four Notre Dame football players - Kyle Hamilton, Cam Hart, Conor Ratigan and KJ Wallace - discussing football and their personal lives. University of Alabama quarterback Bryce Young also had a podcast with The Volume in its first year.

In 2021, the network acquired the distribution rights to Boxing with Chris Mannix. The network also hosts live coverage of wrestling events like WWE's SummerSlam. Also in 2021, the network acquired John Middlekauff's 3 and Out podcast.

In 2022, the network launched Snaps with Aaron and T-Bob, hosted by Aaron Murray and T-Bob Hebert, and Cowherd began co-hosting a podcast with Joe Burrow. Daniel Cormier and Darius Slay also signed on with the company.

The network's podcasts related to sports betting include Alex Monaco's Moneyline Monaco, Olivia Moody's Liv Moods Live, and The Favorites with Chad Millman and Simon Hunter, which moved to The Volume as part of its deal with Action Network.

In 2023, they acquired the Nerd Sesh podcast. On August 23, 2023, it was announced that Shannon Sharpe's Club Shay Shay podcast would now live on the network after departing Fox Sports in June of that year. In September 2023, Sharpe announced he would be hosting another show on The Volume with former star wide receiver, Chad Johnson, called Nightcap with Unc & Ocho.

== Podcasts ==
=== Sports ===
- Colin Cowherd
  - The Herd
  - The Colin Cowherd Podcast
- Shannon Sharpe
  - Club Shay Shay
  - Nightcap with Unc & Ocho (with Chad Johnson)
- The Draymond Green Show
- The Richard Sherman Podcast
- The Daniel Cormier Show
- Club 520 Podcast (with Jeff Teague)
- 4th and South (with Leonard Fournette and Jarvis Landry)
- No Hesitation (with Sophie Cunningham)
- Ross and Rizzo
- Calm Down with Erin and Charissa
- What's Wright? with Nick Wright
- 3 and Out with John Middlekauff
- Hoops Tonight with Jason Timpf

=== Pop culture ===
- Joe and Jada
- KevOnStage
  - Here's The Thing (with Angel Laketa Moore)
  - The Bald Brothers
- The Real Report (with Tony Yayo and Uncle Murda)
- Angie Martinez IRL
- It's Happening (with Snooki and Joey Camasta)
- Chisme with Doknow and Jakarta
- New Rory & Mal

=== Sports betting ===
- FantasyPros
- Sharp and Square
- The Daily Juice
- BettingPros Podcast
