= Hasselbach (Dürre Holzminde) =

River in Germany

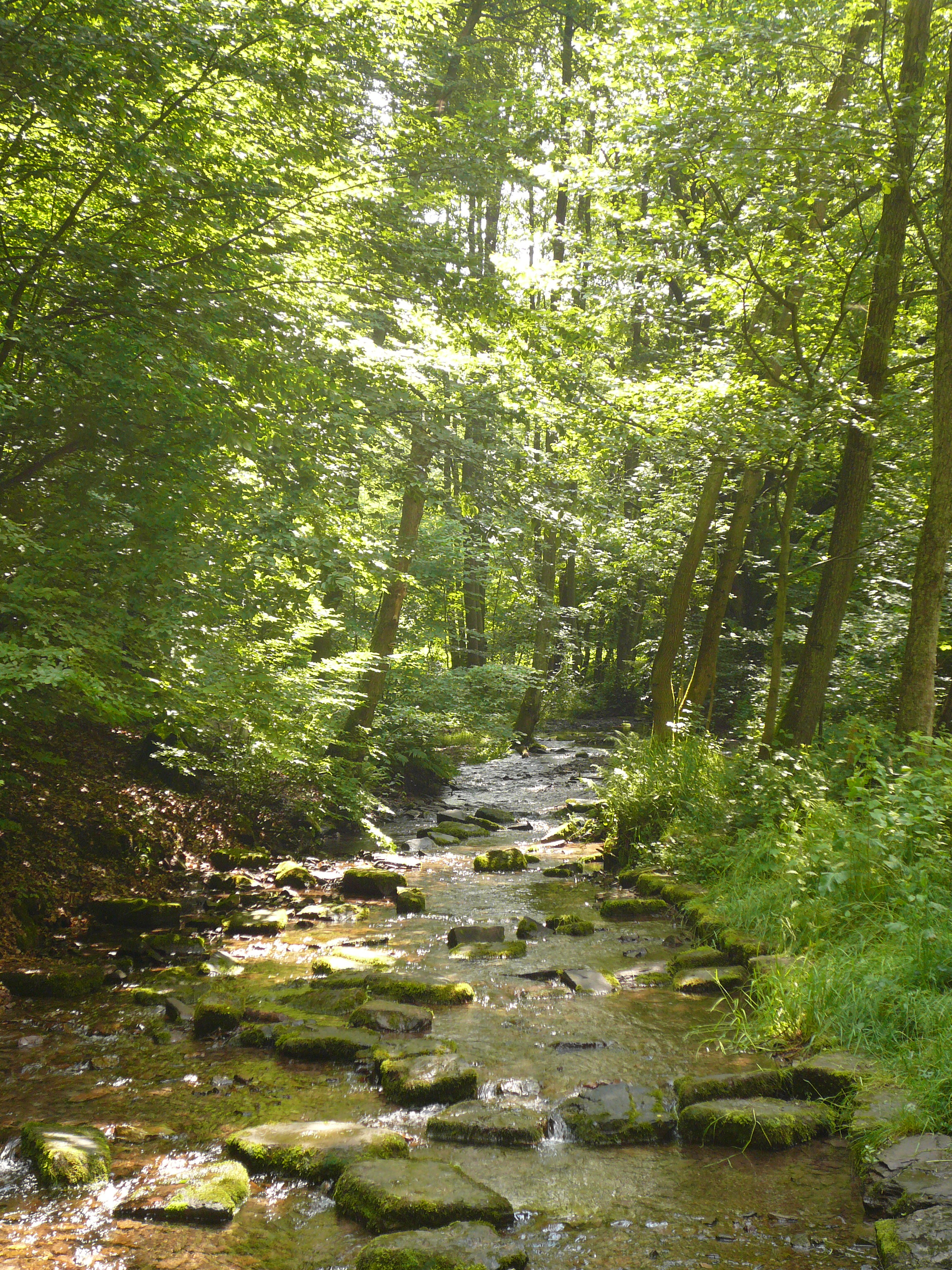

Location
- Country: Germany
- States: Lower Saxony

Physical characteristics
- Mouth
  - location: Dürre Holzminde
  - coordinates: 51°49′15″N 9°29′11″E

Basin features
- Progression: Dürre Holzminde→ Holzminde→ Weser→ North Sea

Hasselbach is a small river of Lower Saxony, Germany. It flows into the Dürre Holzminde near Holzminden.

== See also ==
- List of rivers of Lower Saxony
