= Nightcap (podcast) =

- Genre: Sports
- Language: English

Cast and voices
- Hosted by: Shannon Sharpe; Chad Johnson; Joe Johnson

Production
- Production: The Volume, Shay Shay Media

Publication
- Original release: September 2023 – present
- Updates: three times per week

Nightcap (or Nightcap with Unc and Ocho) is a nighttime podcast produced by The Volume and Shay Shay Media. It is hosted by former NFL players Shannon Sharpe and Chad Ochocinco Johnson, and former NBA player Joe Johnson. The podcast is live streamed on YouTube and the audio is available on podcast platforms.

== History ==
The show premiered as part of the Club Shay Shay YouTube channel in September 2023. It debuted at #46 in the Top 50 U.S Podcasts. The show was originally called The Nightcap with Unc and Ocho and was hosted by Sharpe and Johnson. "Unc" is a shortening of Sharpe's nickname (Uncle/Uncle Shannon); "Ocho" is a shortening of Ochocinco, Johnson's nickname and legal middle name. In October 2023, the podcast launched its own YouTube channel. The title of the show was shortened to Nightcap.

In December 2023, it was announced that Gilbert Arenas would be joining the podcast. Arenas co-hosted the show throughout the first half of 2024. His final listed appearance on the show was June 7. After Arenas' departure, different athletes appeared as guest co-hosts on the show. Joe Johnson was a regular guest co-host throughout the second half of 2024 and early 2025. In April 2025, it was announced that Joe Johnson would be joining the podcast as an official co-host.

== Awards and recognitions ==
=== 2024 ===
- 2nd place: Sports Podcast Awards - Best Comedy Sports Podcast
- 3rd place: Sports Podcast Awards - Best American Football Podcast
- Nominee: NAACP Image Awards - Outstanding Arts and Entertainment Podcast)
- Finalist, Gold Honor: Shorty Awards - Sports Podcast
- Finalist: Shorty Awards - Vertical Video

=== 2025 ===
- Nominated: Webby Awards - Best Video Series, Features (Podcasts)
- Winner: Webby Awards - People’s Voice Award for Best Sports Show
- Winner: Webby Awards - People's Voice Award for Best Live Podcast Recording (for Nightcap: Summer Sessions)
- Nominated: NAACP Image Awards - Outstanding Sports, Arts and Entertainment Podcast
