= Dürre Holzminde =

River in Germany

Location
- Country: Germany
- State: Lower Saxony

Physical characteristics
- Mouth
  - location: Holzminde
  - coordinates: 51.8256°N 9.4599°E

Basin features
- Progression: Holzminde→ Weser→ North Sea

Dürre Holzminde is a small river of Lower Saxony, Germany, which flows into the Holzminde in Holzminden.

== See also ==
- List of rivers of Lower Saxony
