= Hasselbach (surname) =

Hasselbach is a German surname. Notable people with the surname include:

- Carl Gustav Friedrich Hasselbach (1809–1882), German politician
- Harald Hasselbach (1967–2023), Dutch gridiron football player
- Ingo Hasselbach (born 1967), German political activist and author

== See also ==
- Karl Albert Hasselbalch (1874–1962), Danish physician and chemist
- Hasselbeck, surname
