= Hasselbeck =

Hasselbeck is a surname of German origin. Notable people with this surname include:

- Don Hasselbeck (1955–2025), American football player
- Elisabeth Hasselbeck (born 1977), American television personality and talk show host
- Matt Hasselbeck (born 1975), American football player
- Tim Hasselbeck (born 1978), American football player and sports analyst

== See also ==
- Hasselbach (surname)
