= Hasselbach (Werre) =

River in North Rhine-Westphalia, Germany

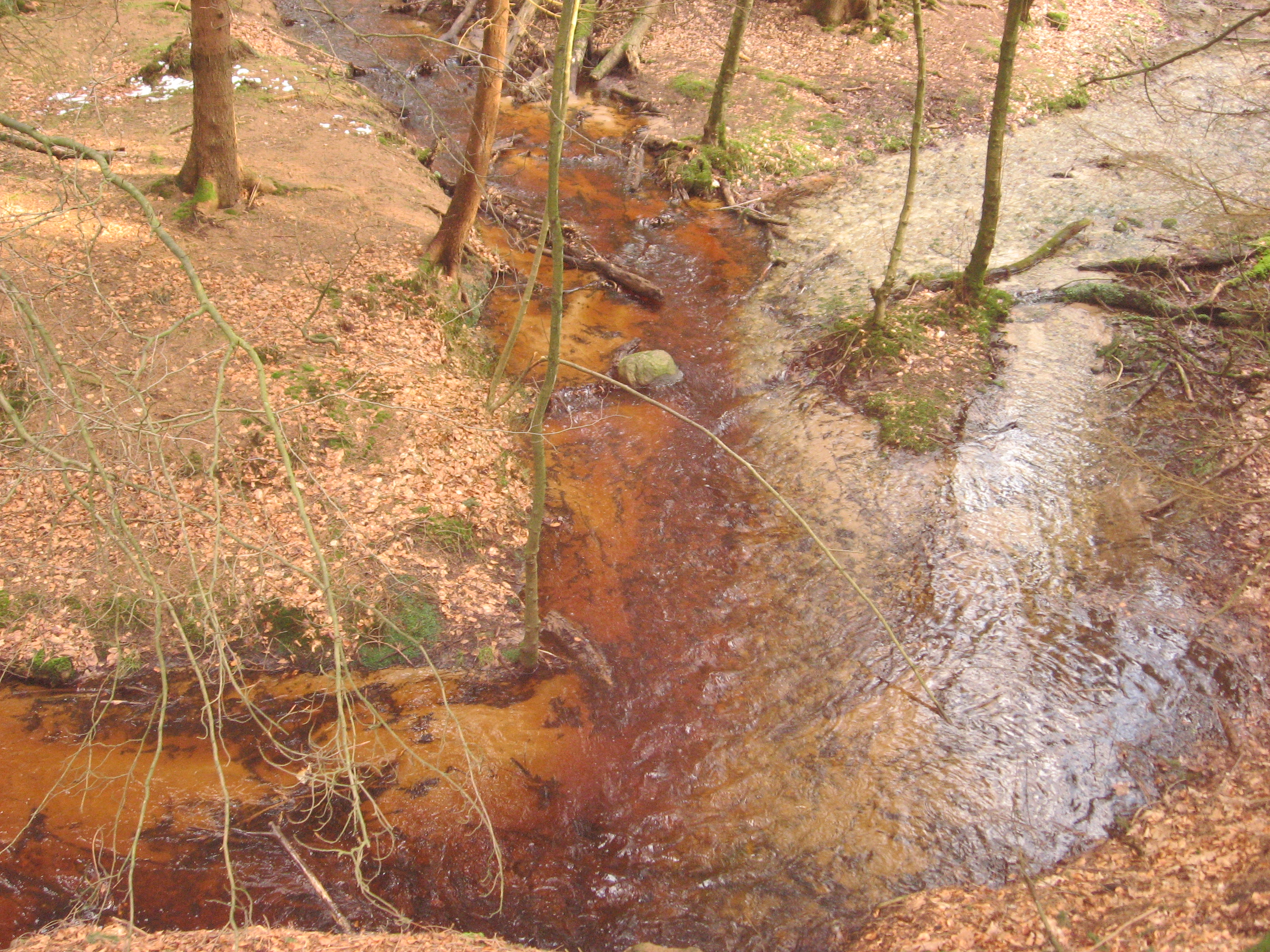

Location
- Country: Germany
- States: North Rhine-Westphalia

Physical characteristics
- Mouth
  - location: Werre
  - coordinates: 51.9582°N 8.8164°E

Basin features
- Progression: Werre→ Weser→ North Sea

Hasselbach is a small river of North Rhine-Westphalia, Germany. It is 6.5 km long and a left tributary of the Werre near Detmold.

It is one of eight rivers and streams in North Rhine-Westphalia named Hasselbach.

== See also ==
- List of rivers of North Rhine-Westphalia
