= Club Shay Shay =

Sports and pop culture podcast

- Genre: Interview
- Language: English

Cast and voices
- Hosted by: Shannon Sharpe

Production
- Production: The Volume, Shay Shay Media

Publication
- Original release: September 2020
- Updates: Weekly

Related
- Website: thevolume.com/club-shay-shay

Club Shay Shay is an American podcast hosted by sports analyst and former NFL player Shannon Sharpe. It is co-produced by The Volume and Shay Shay Media, and airs once a week. On the podcast, Sharpe interviews athletes and celebrities about current events, sports, and pop culture. Episodes of the podcast are filmed, and the video format is released on the show's YouTube channel.

== History ==
Club Shay Shay launched in September 2020 as a Fox Sports podcast. The first episode featured Shannon Sharpe's brother, Sterling Sharpe. In August 2023, it was announced that Sharpe and his Club Shay Shay podcast would join The Volume, a digital podcast network founded by Colin Cowherd, under a multi-year deal. In 2024, Sharpe's interview with Katt Williams on the January 3 episode of the podcast drew much media attention, including being parodied by Saturday Night Live. In October 2024, Sharpe's interview with U.S. presidential candidate Kamala Harris drew national media attention.

== Awards ==
=== 2021 ===
- Finalist: Shorty Awards (Podcast category)
- Shortlist: Hashtag Sports Awards (Best Sports Podcast)
- List: "Apple Podcasts Best of 2021"

=== 2022 ===
- Winner: Shorty Awards (Podcast category)

=== 2024 ===
- Winner: iHeartRadio Podcast Awards (Best Sports Podcast)
- Winner: Webby Awards (Featured Guest, Individual Episodes (Podcasts), for Katt Williams interview)
- Finalist, Bronze Honor, and Audience Honor: Shorty Awards (YouTube Presence)
- Finalist: Shorty Awards (TikTok Presence)
- Finalist and Audience Honor: Shorty Awards (YouTube Presence).
- Winner: BET Hip Hop Awards (Best Hip Hop Platform)

=== 2025 ===
- Winner: NAACP Image Awards (Outstanding Culture and Society Podcast)
- Winner: Webby Awards (Best Creator or Influencer Series)
- Winner: Webby Awards (People’s Voice for Best Creator or Influencer Series)
