= Holzminde =

River in Germany

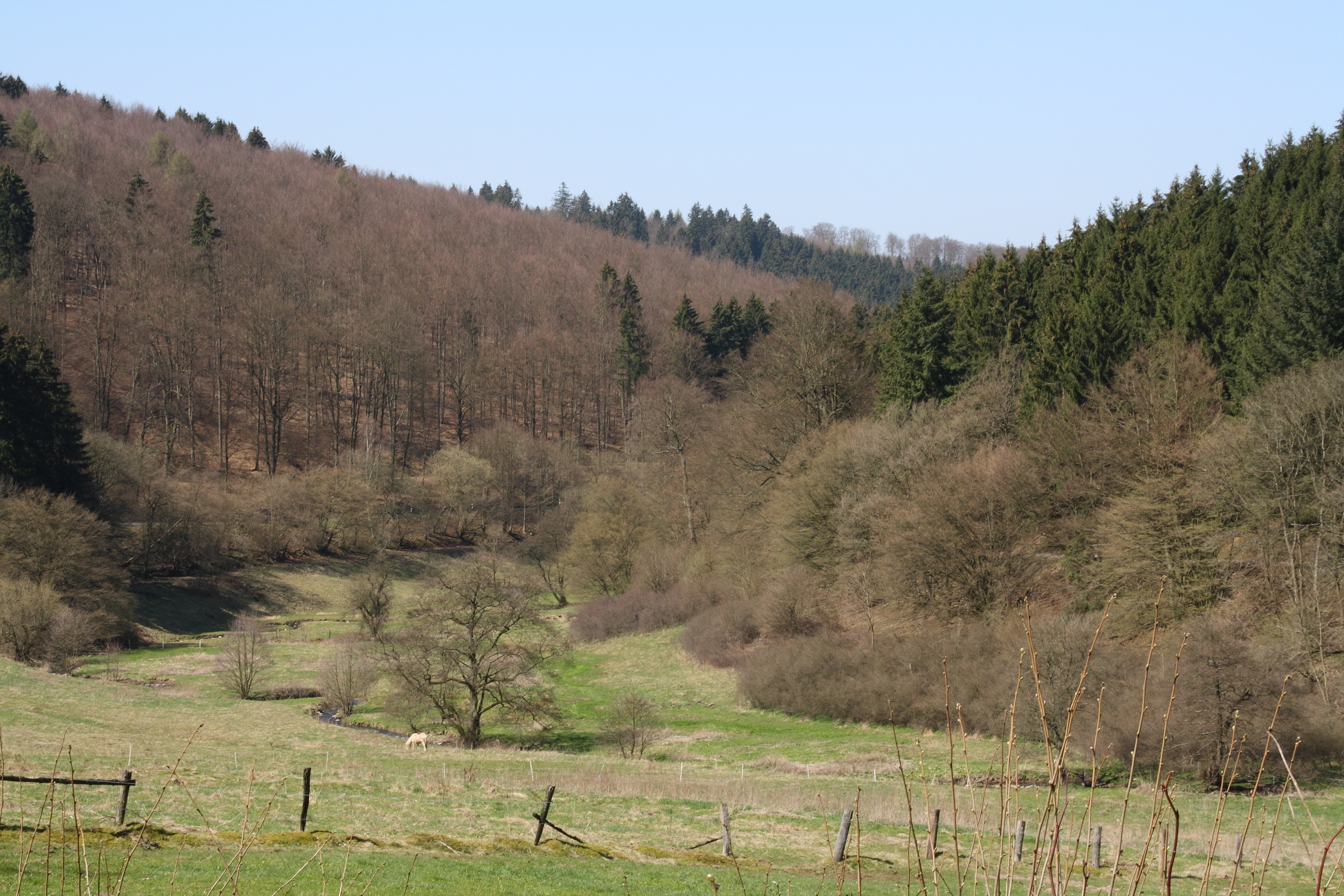

Location
- Country: Germany
- State: Lower Saxony

Physical characteristics
- Mouth
  - location: Weser
  - coordinates: 51.8266°N 9.4428°E
- Length: 17.4 km (10.8 mi)

Basin features
- Progression: Weser→ North Sea

Holzminde is a river of Lower Saxony, Germany. It flows into the Weser in Holzminden.

== See also ==
- List of rivers of Lower Saxony
