= Shannon Sharpe =

American football player and sports analyst (born 1968)

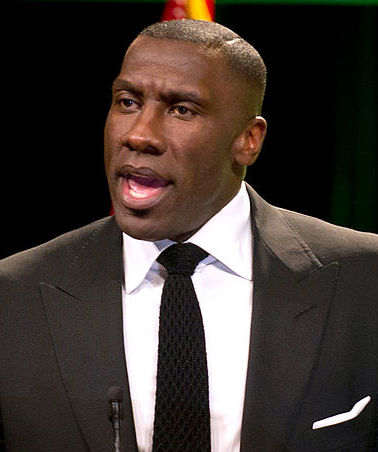
- Sharpe in 2012

No. 81, 84, 82
- Position: Tight end

Personal information
- Born: June 26, 1968 (age 58); Chicago, Illinois, U.S.
- Listed height: 6 ft 2 in (1.88 m)
- Listed weight: 228 lb (103 kg)

Career information
- High school: Glennville (Glennville, Georgia)
- College: Savannah State (1986–1989)
- NFL draft: 1990: 7th round, 192nd overall pick

Career history
- Denver Broncos (1990–1999); Baltimore Ravens (2000–2001); Denver Broncos (2002–2003)

Awards and highlights
- 3× Super Bowl champion (XXXII, XXXIII, XXXV); 4× First-team All-Pro (1993, 1996–1998); Second-team All-Pro (1995); 8× Pro Bowl (1992–1998, 2001); NFL 1990s All-Decade Team; Denver Broncos Ring of Fame; Denver Broncos 50th Anniversary Team; First-team DII All-American (1989); SIAC Player of the Year (1987); 3× First-team All-SIAC (1987–1989); Savannah State Tigers No. 2 retired; Savannah State Athletics Hall of Fame; Black College Football Hall of Fame; NFL records: Most receiving yards by a tight end in a game: 214; Longest touchdown reception in a postseason game: 96 yards

Career NFL statistics
- Receptions: 815
- Receiving yards: 10,060
- Receiving touchdowns: 62
- Stats at Pro Football Reference
- Pro Football Hall of Fame

Shannon Sharpe (born June 26, 1968) is an American former professional football tight end who played in the National Football League (NFL) for 14 seasons, primarily with the Denver Broncos. He is considered one of the greatest tight ends of all time.

Sharpe played college football for the Savannah State Tigers and was selected by the Broncos in the seventh round of the 1990 NFL draft. During his 12 non-consecutive seasons with Denver, he was selected to seven consecutive Pro Bowls and four first-team All-Pros, and won two consecutive Super Bowl titles. In between his Broncos tenure, Sharpe was a member of Baltimore Ravens for two seasons, receiving an eighth Pro Bowl selection and winning a third Super Bowl title. The first NFL tight end to amass over 10,000 receiving yards, Sharpe retired as the NFL leader in tight end receptions, receiving yards, and receiving touchdowns. He was inducted to the Pro Football Hall of Fame in 2011.

Following his retirement, Sharpe appeared as an analyst for The NFL Today on CBS Sports and co-hosted Skip and Shannon: Undisputed on Fox Sports 1 with Skip Bayless from 2016 to 2023. In the 2020s, Sharpe also became a prominent figure in the sports podcast space, hosting Club Shay Shay and Nightcap. After departing Undisputed in 2023, Sharpe joined ESPN and was a weekly analyst on First Take until 2025.

== Early life and education ==
Sharpe, the younger brother of Hall of Fame NFL star wide receiver Sterling Sharpe, grew up in Glennville, Georgia, where he was an all-state player in three sports at Glennville High School. He once joked, "We were so poor, a robber once broke into our house and we ended up robbing the robber." He commented, "I was a terrible student. I didn't graduate magna cum laude, I graduated 'Thank you, Lawdy!'" At Savannah State University, he played football and basketball, and also competed in track and field. In track, he competed in jumping and throwing events.

Sharpe was a three-time All-Southern Intercollegiate Athletic Conference selection from 1987 to 1989 and the SIAC Player of the Year in 1987. He was also selected as a Kodak Division II All-American in 1989. He led the Tigers' football team to their best records in the program's history: 7–3 in 1988 and 8–1 in 1989. As a senior, Sharpe caught 61 passes for 1,312 yards and 18 touchdowns, including three games with more than 200 yards. Sharpe finished his college career with 192 receptions for 3,744 yards and 40 touchdowns. He was inducted into the Division II Football Hall of Fame in 2009, Savannah State's athletic Hall of Fame in 2010, and the Black College Football Hall of Fame in 2013. In addition, Savannah State University also retired Sharpe's No. 2 jersey.

== Professional career ==
Pre-draft measurables
Height	Weight	Arm length	Hand span	40-yard dash	10-yard split	20-yard split	20-yard shuttle	Vertical jump	Broad jump
6 ft 1 1/4 in (1.86 m)	221 lb (100 kg)	33 in (0.84 m)	10 in (0.25 m)	4.67 s	1.61 s	2.81 s	4.55 s	34.0 in (0.86 m)	10 ft 2 in (3.10 m)
All values from NFL Combine

Despite his stellar college career, Sharpe was not considered a highly rated prospect in the 1990 NFL draft. In addition to playing Division II college football, Sharpe's size—6 ft 2 in (1.88 m), 230 lb (104 kg)—was considered too large for a receiver and too small for a tight end. He was eventually selected in the seventh round with the 192nd pick by the Denver Broncos. After two mediocre seasons as a receiver in which he caught just 29 passes, Denver converted him to a tight end. This quickly paid off, as Sharpe caught 53 passes in his third season. He remained with Denver until 1999, winning two championship rings at Super Bowl XXXII and Super Bowl XXXIII in the process. After a two-year stint with the Baltimore Ravens, where he won another championship ring at Super Bowl XXXV, he returned to the Broncos. He played there until 2003. From there, he retired to become an NFL analyst for CBS.

Ozzie Newsome, the Ravens' general manager, said of Sharpe during his career: "I think he's a threat when he's on the field. He has to be double-teamed. He's a great route-runner. He's proven that he can make the big plays. That's what separates him. He's a threat." Sharpe was selected to the All-Pro Team four times, played in eight Pro Bowls (1992–1998, 2001) and amassed over 1,000 receiving yards in three different seasons. In a 1993 playoff game against the Los Angeles Raiders, Sharpe tied a postseason record with 13 receptions for 156 yards and a touchdown. In the Ravens' 2000 AFC title game against the Oakland Raiders, he caught a short pass on third down and 18 from his own four-yard line and took it 96 yards for a touchdown, the only touchdown the Ravens scored, en route to a 16–3 Ravens win; as of 2025, this remains the Ravens' longest offensive play in team history. Sharpe also caught a 50+ yard pass in each of their other two playoff games. He finished his 14-year career with 815 receptions for 10,060 yards and 62 touchdowns in 203 games.

Sharpe was among the 17 finalists being considered for enshrinement at the Pro Football Hall of Fame in 2009. However, he was passed over in his first year in a class that included Bruce Smith, Ralph Wilson, Derrick Thomas and Rod Woodson.

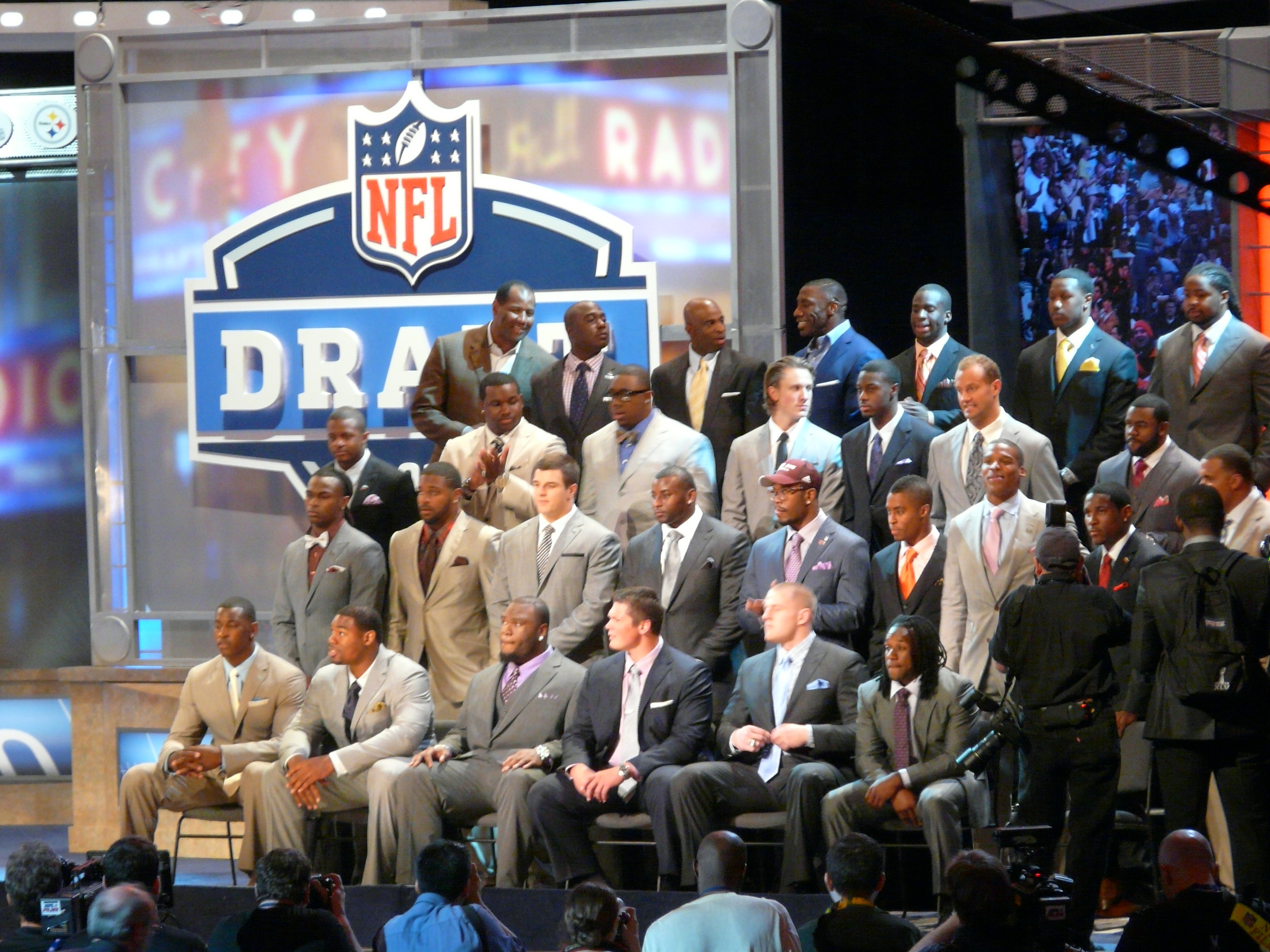
2011 NFL Hall of Famers, including Shannon Sharpe (back row, center), with 2011 NFL draft class invitees

On November 28, 2010, Sharpe was nominated as a semi-finalist for induction into the 2011 Pro Football Hall of Fame, along with Art Modell and 24 others, among them Jerome Bettis, Roger Craig, Marshall Faulk, and Deion Sanders. Subsequently, on February 6, 2011, Shannon Sharpe was inducted into the Pro Football Hall of Fame.

== NFL career statistics ==
Legend
	Won the Super Bowl
	NFL record
**Bold**	Career high

=== Regular season ===
Year	Team	GP	Rec	Yds	Avg	Lng	TD
1990	DEN	16	7	99	14.1	33	1
1991	DEN	16	22	322	14.6	37	1
1992	DEN	16	53	639	12.1	55	2
1993	DEN	16	81	995	12.3	63	9
1994	DEN	15	**87**	1,010	11.6	44	4
1995	DEN	13	63	756	12.0	49	4
1996	DEN	15	80	1,062	13.3	51	**10**
1997	DEN	16	72	**1,107**	**15.4**	68	3
1998	DEN	16	64	768	12.0	38	**10**
1999	DEN	5	23	224	9.7	24	0
2000	BAL	16	67	811	12.1	59	5
2001	BAL	16	73	811	11.1	37	2
2002	DEN	12	61	686	11.2	**82**	3
2003	DEN	15	62	770	12.4	28	8
Total		203	815	10,060	12.3	82	62

=== Postseason ===
Year	Team	Games		Receiving					Rushing					Fumbles	
Year	Team	GP	GS	Rec	Yds	Avg	Lng	TD	Att	Yds	Avg	Lng	TD	Fum	Lost
1991	DEN	2	2	6	60	10.0	15	0	—	—	—	—	—	0	0
1993	DEN	1	1	**13**	156	12.0	28	1	—	—	—	—	—	0	0
1996	DEN	1	1	2	31	15.5	18	1	—	—	—	—	—	0	0
1997	DEN	4	4	12	149	12.4	46	0	—	—	—	—	—	0	0
1998	DEN	3	3	9	78	8.7	14	0	—	—	—	—	—	0	0
2000	BAL	4	4	6	**230**	**38.3**	**96**	**2**	—	—	—	—	—	0	0
2001	BAL	2	2	9	79	8.8	27	0	—	—	—	—	—	0	0
2003	DEN	1	1	5	31	6.2	9	0	—	—	—	—	—	0	0
Career		18	18	62	814	13.1	96	4	0	0	0.0	0	0	0	0

== Sportscasting and podcasting career ==
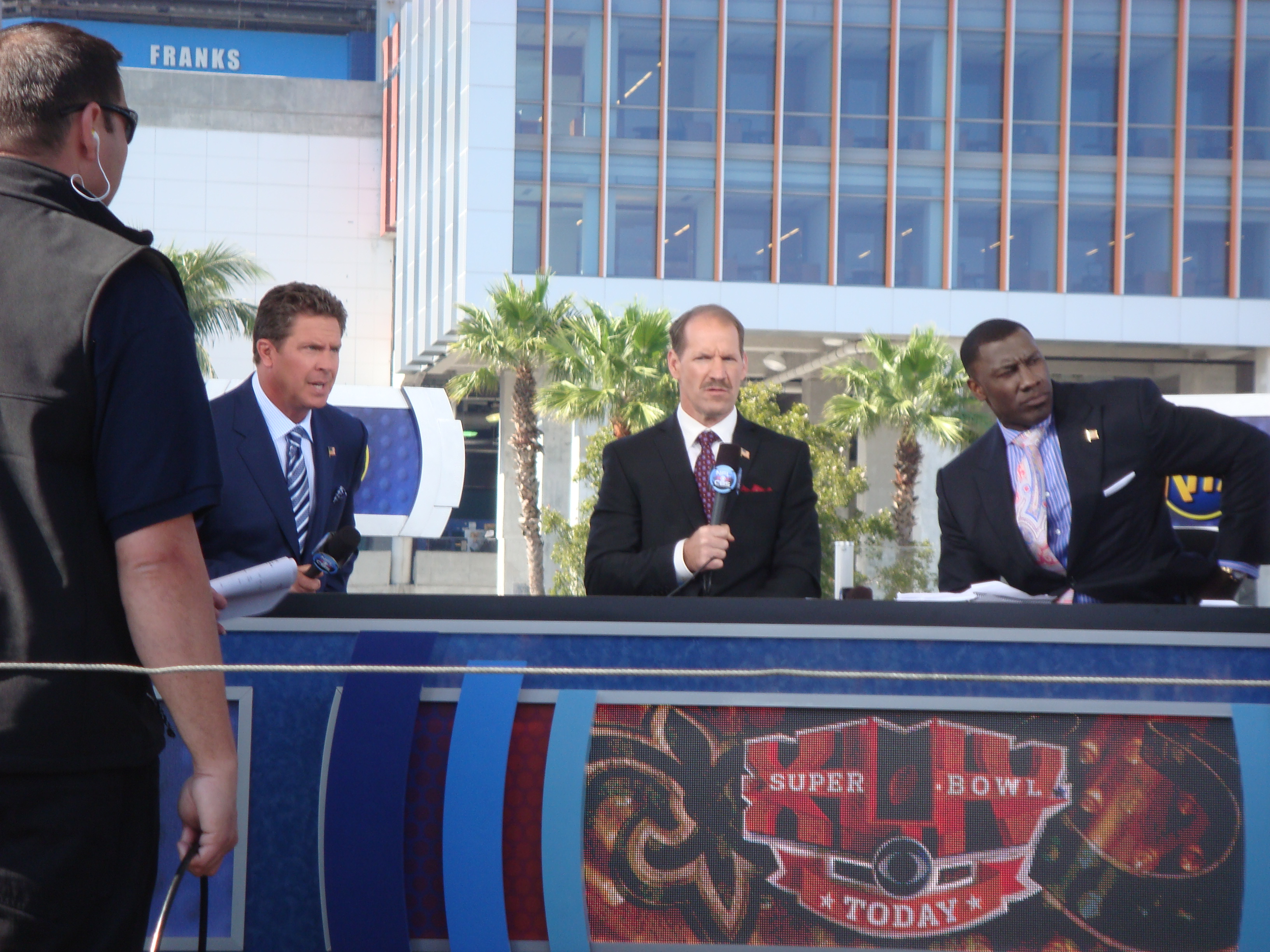
Super Bowl XLIV pre-game show: Dan Marino, Bill Cowher, and Shannon Sharpe (right)

Sharpe was a commentator for the CBS Sports pregame show The NFL Today, including the Sprint Halftime Report and the Subway Postgame Show, replacing Deion Sanders and co-hosting with James Brown (formerly with Fox NFL Sunday), former NFL quarterbacks Dan Marino and Boomer Esiason, as well as former coach Bill Cowher. In the 2004 NFL regular season, Sharpe defeated Marino and Esiason in the pick 'em game of The NFL Today with a 53–21 record. On February 18, 2014, it was announced that Sharpe, along with Dan Marino, were being relieved of their duties as on-air commentators on The NFL Today and were being replaced by Tony Gonzalez and Bart Scott.

In 2013, Sharpe became a columnist and spokesperson for FitnessRX For Men magazine and appeared on their September 2013 cover. Sharpe has hosted Sirius NFL Radio's Opening Drive morning program, alongside Bob Papa.

After his retirement, Sharpe has been a social media staple, going viral for his antics and sports commentary. He is also notably a huge supporter of NBA player LeBron James, referring to him as the greatest basketball player in NBA history. He also appeared on the American Dad! episode "The Scarlett Getter", portraying himself.

Sharpe joined Skip Bayless in FS1's sports debate show Skip and Shannon: Undisputed which premiered on September 6, 2016. In addition to his defense of LeBron James, Sharpe was also known for his criticism of Tom Brady and the Dallas Cowboys on the show. On May 31, 2023, it was announced that Sharpe would soon leave Undisputed after reaching a buyout agreement with Fox Sports. On June 13, Sharpe co-hosted his last episode of Undisputed. He later confirmed that he and Bayless had a falling out following an argument where Bayless compared Sharpe's NFL career to Tom Brady's.

Sharpe also has multiple podcasts: Club Shay Shay (which he hosts) and Nightcap (which he hosts with Chad Ochocinco Johnson and Joe Johnson). The episode of Club Shay Shay featuring Bubba Wallace was selected by the Apple Podcasts editorial team on their "Apple Podcasts Best of 2021" list. Both podcasts have been nominated for and won multiple awards for online media.

On August 23, 2023, it was announced that Sharpe and his Club Shay Shay podcast would join The Volume, a digital podcast network founded by Colin Cowherd under a multi-year deal. The following day, Sharpe was announced to join First Take on ESPN as a recurring panelist, beginning on September 4, 2023. He appeared every Monday and Tuesday during the 2023 NFL season. On February 16, 2024, Sharpe signed a contract extension to remain on the show. In June 2024, Sharpe had officially signed a new multi-year contract extension with ESPN which also allowed him to expand his role on First Take.

On September 12, Nightcap streamed The Roast of Shannon Sharpe, with special guests including Lavell Crawford, Kai Cenat, Godfrey, Cam Newton, and Snoop Dogg.

In February 2025, the "Club Shay Shay" podcast won the Outstanding Society and Culture Podcast at the 2025 NAACP Image Awards. He was also a nominee for Entertainer of the Year but was edged out by actress, singer and television personality Keke Palmer.

On April 24, 2025, Sharpe departed from ESPN for an unknown period of time amid a sexual assault lawsuit against him. Despite his intent to return to ESPN in time for the start of the NFL preseason, the amount of time that Sharpe will be on hiatus remains indefinite. On July 30, 2025, it was reported that ESPN cut ties with Sharpe after the settlement of the rape lawsuit.

== Personal life ==
Sharpe has three children: a son and two daughters.

On February 10, 2023, former NFL quarterback Brett Favre began a lawsuit against Sharpe and fellow former NFL player Pat McAfee, as well as Mississippi auditor Shad White, for making "defamatory charges" about Favre's involvement in a $77 million welfare fraud scheme. A representative for Favre stated that Sharpe and McAfee "tried to enhance their careers by fabricating unsubstantiated defamation charges against [Favre]." The lawsuit was dismissed by the United States District Court for the District of Mississippi and the U.S. Circuit Court of Appeals for the Fifth Circuit affirmed the dismissal.

In May 2023, Sharpe's Los Angeles home was burglarized with over $1 million worth of items stolen, according to several media reports. Obvious signs of forced entry were not found by the police. Sharpe announced a $50,000 reward for information leading to an arrest and conviction.

On September 11, 2024, Sharpe inadvertently started an Instagram Live after throwing his phone onto his bed; the live video captured only the audio of him while he engaged in sexual intercourse. Sharpe initially denied his involvement in the act, stating his account was hacked. Later that night, he admitted on Nightcap that the video was authentic and apologized for his actions.

=== Sexual assault lawsuit ===
On April 21, 2025, Sharpe was named as a defendant in a civil lawsuit filed by OnlyFans sex worker Gabriella Zuniga, who initially used the pseudonym "Jane Doe", and is represented by attorney Tony Buzbee. The 13-page complaint alleged Sharpe committed "assault, sexual assault, battery, and sexual battery" and engaged in the "intentional infliction of emotional distress", and sought compensatory and punitive damages of more than $50 million from Sharpe. In response, Sharpe released a video denying the accusations and calling the whole issue "a shakedown". Soon afterwards, the woman's legal team sent numerous text messages which were exchanged between her and Sharpe to Larry Brown Sports. Sharpe's legal team had previously revealed some text messages exchanged between Sharpe and the woman as well.

Sharpe's lawyer Lanny Davis conceded that Sharpe previously offered a "$10 million" settlement to the accuser. In a recording obtained by People magazine, a voice resembling Sharpe's is ostensibly heard threatening physical harm to the accuser, with the words, "If you say that word one more time, I'm gonna fucking choke the shit out of you when I see you."

On July 18, 2025, Zuniga's lawyer Tony Buzbee announced that the lawsuit was resolved out of court after "protracted and respectful negotiations". The case was dismissed with prejudice, meaning it cannot be refiled. The exact financial terms were not disclosed publicly, though multiple reliable sources reported that the settlement was substantially less than the $50 million originally sought. It is believed to have exceeded $10 million, potentially significantly so, though any exact figure remains confidential. There was no admission of guilt by Sharpe as part of the resolution.

Following the filing of the lawsuit in April 2025, Sharpe stepped aside temporarily from his duties at ESPN, where he appeared on First Take citing the need to address the allegations. Although he originally intended to return for the start of the NFL preseason, less than two weeks after the settlement, ESPN announced it would not be renewing his contract, effectively ending his association with the network in late July 2025.

Hours after the settlement was reported, Gabriella Zuniga announced her retirement from OnlyFans, expressing gratitude and looking toward new opportunities.
