= Chad Johnson =

American gridiron football player (born 1978)

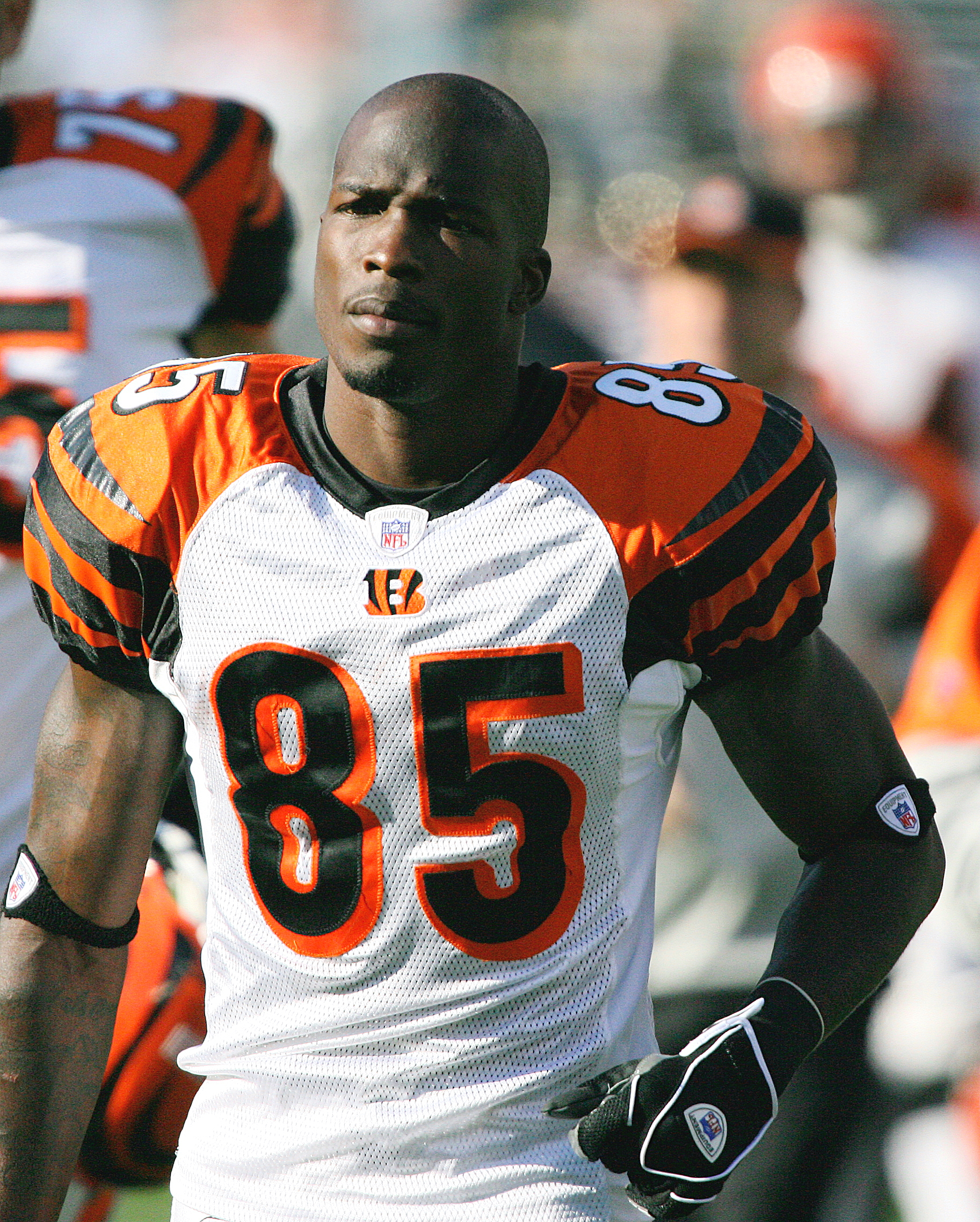
- Johnson with the Cincinnati Bengals in 2006

No. 85
- Position: Wide receiver

Personal information
- Born: January 9, 1978 (age 48); Miami, Florida, U.S.
- Listed height: 6 ft 1 in (1.85 m)
- Listed weight: 192 lb (87 kg)

Career information
- High school: Miami Beach Senior
- College: Santa Monica (1997, 1999); Oregon State (2000)
- NFL draft: 2001: 2nd round, 36th overall pick

Career history
- Cincinnati Bengals (2001–2010); New England Patriots (2011); Miami Dolphins (2012)*; Montreal Alouettes (2014); Fundidores de Monterrey (2017)
- * Offseason or practice squad member only

Awards and highlights
- 2× First-team All-Pro (2005, 2006); Second-team All-Pro (2003); 6× Pro Bowl (2003–2007, 2009); NFL receiving yards leader (2006); Cincinnati Bengals Ring of Honor; Cincinnati Bengals 40th Anniversary Team; Cincinnati Bengals 50th Anniversary Team

Career NFL statistics
- Receptions: 766
- Receiving yards: 11,059
- Receiving touchdowns: 67
- Stats at Pro Football Reference

Career CFL statistics
- Receptions: 7
- Receiving yards: 151
- Receiving touchdowns: 1
- Stats at CFL.ca (archived)
Association football career
- Position: Forward
Senior career*
Years	Team	Apps	(Gls)
2018–2019	Boca Raton FC		(3)
- * Club domestic league appearances and goals as of 20 April 2024

Chad Ochocinco Johnson (born Chad Javon Johnson, January 9, 1978), known from 2008 to 2012 as Chad Ochocinco, is an American former professional football player who was a wide receiver for 11 seasons in the National Football League (NFL). He played college football for the Santa Monica Corsairs and the Oregon State Beavers, and played for the Cincinnati Bengals and the New England Patriots during his tenure playing in the NFL. He was selected by the Bengals in the second round of the 2001 NFL draft, and played for them for 10 seasons. "Ochocinco", which means "eight five" in Spanish, derives from his number, eighty-five. In 2011, Johnson was traded to the Patriots, for whom he played in Super Bowl XLVI.

In 2012, Johnson played for the Miami Dolphins during the preseason but was released shortly after being arrested for domestic violence. He played for the Montreal Alouettes of the Canadian Football League (CFL) from 2014 to 2015, and played one game in 2017 for the Mexican team Fundidores de Monterrey of the Liga de Fútbol Americano Profesional (LFA). Johnson emerged as one of the NFL's most productive wide receivers of the 2000s and holds nearly every Bengals receiving record.

In April 2011, CNBC listed Johnson as number one on its list of "most influential athletes in social media". Johnson was a six-time Pro Bowler, was named to three All-Pro teams and was voted as the number one wide receiver on the Bengals 40th Anniversary team.

== Early life ==
Johnson was born in Miami, Florida and is of Bahamian descent. He played high school football at Miami Beach Senior High School, catching 118 career passes and averaging 26.4 yards per catch.

Johnson, who rarely attended class in high school, did not qualify academically for a major college. He enrolled at Division II Langston University in 1996 but was kicked out of school for fighting and skipping classes. He never played in any games at Langston.

== College career ==
=== Santa Monica College ===
In 1997, Johnson transferred to Santa Monica College, a community college in Santa Monica, California. While at Santa Monica College, he played with future NFL wide receiver Steve Smith. Johnson played the 1997 season but was ruled academically ineligible in 1998. He returned to Santa Monica in 1999 and caught 63 passes during the 1999 season.

=== Oregon State ===
In 2000, Johnson transferred to Oregon State University, after being aggressively recruited by coach Dennis Erickson to play for the OSU team. Alongside future Bengals teammate T. J. Houshmandzadeh, he led his team to an 11–1 season and a 41–9 victory over Notre Dame in the Fiesta Bowl that year. Johnson also broke a school record for the longest touchdown reception with a 97-yard reception in a game against Stanford. In his one season at the school, he played in 12 games and recorded 37 receptions for 806 yards and 8 touchdowns.

== Professional career ==
Pre-draft measurables
Height	Weight	Arm length	Hand span	40-yard dash	10-yard split	20-yard split	20-yard shuttle	Three-cone drill	Vertical jump	Broad jump
6 ft 1 in (1.85 m)	192 lb (87 kg)	32 in (0.81 m)	9 1/2 in (0.24 m)	4.57 s	1.56 s	2.65 s	4.14 s	7.51 s	33 in (0.84 m)	9 ft 0 in (2.74 m)
All values from NFL Combine

=== Cincinnati Bengals ===
==== 2001 season ====
The Cincinnati Bengals chose Johnson in the second round of the 2001 NFL draft with the 36th overall pick. In Johnson's rookie year, he saw moderate playing time in a wide receiver room headlined by Peter Warrick and Darnay Scott as well. He scored his first NFL touchdown in Week 3 against the San Diego Chargers on an eight-yard reception. He recorded 28 receptions for 329 yards and one touchdown in the 2001 season.

==== 2002 season ====
In Week 10 of the 2002 season, Johnson had his first 100-yard game with seven receptions for 110 yards and one touchdown in the 38–27 loss to the Baltimore Ravens. In Week 12, in a 29–21 loss to the Pittsburgh Steelers, he had seven receptions for 152 yards. He had five games going over 100 receiving yards in the 2002 season as the Bengals went 2–14. In the 2002 season, Johnson had 69 receptions for 1,166 receiving yards and five receiving touchdowns.

==== 2003 season ====
In Week 2 of the 2003 season, Johnson had eight receptions for 131 yards against the Oakland Raiders. In Week 4, a 21–14 win over the Cleveland Browns, he had his first multi-touchdown game as a professional. In Week 12, he had ten receptions for 107 and three touchdowns in a 34–27 win over the San Diego Chargers. In the 2003 season, he broke the Bengals franchise record formerly held by Carl Pickens by recording 1,355 receiving yards on 90 receptions to go with 10 touchdowns as the Bengals improved to 8–8. He was named as a Pro Bowler for the first time.

==== 2004 season ====
In Week 7 of the 2004 season, he had seven receptions for 149 yards and one touchdown in the 23–10 victory over the Denver Broncos. In Week 13, a 27–26 win over the Baltimore Ravens, he had ten receptions for 161 yards and two touchdowns. In the 2004 season, he caught 95 passes for nine touchdowns and 1,274 yards, including 117 receiving yards in a 58–48 win against the Cleveland Browns. He earned Pro Bowl honors for the second consecutive season.

==== 2005 season ====
In Week 2 of the 2005 season, Johnson had seven receptions for 139 yards and one touchdown in the 37–8 win over the Minnesota Vikings. In Week 6, in a 31–23 win over the Tennessee Titans, he had eight receptions for 135 yards and one touchdown. In Week 11, against the Indianapolis Colts, he had eight receptions for 189 yards and one touchdown in the 45–37 loss to the Colts. He surpassed his franchise record in 2005, recording 1,432 yards on 97 receptions for nine touchdowns. He led the AFC in receiving yards. He made the Pro Bowl for the third consecutive season. He earned first team All Pro honors for the first time.

===== The List =====
During the 2005 NFL season, Johnson announced that he would keep a checklist, titled who Covered 85 in '05, that would evaluate the defensive backs who successfully managed to cover him. On November 2, 2005, Marvin Lewis, the Bengals' head coach, replaced Johnson's list with another one titled, Did 85 do everything he could to lead his team to victory 11-6-05. The list, an obvious parody of the original, asked several questions regarding Johnson's performance both on and off the field. According to the Bengals' official website, the list was aimed to antagonize their divisional rival, the Baltimore Ravens, whom the Bengals would play in four days. Johnson was not pleased with the new list, as he had developed a superstitious faith in the older list. He had a stellar performance during the game, prompting the return of the original list.

In 2007, Degree and Yahoo! created an online version of his checklist. The checklist allowed fans to vote for which NFL quarterback Johnson would like to play catch with the most. Every vote helped him raise money for his charity project, "Feed the Children".

==== 2006 season ====
On April 20, 2006, Johnson signed an extension to his contract through 2011.

During the first half of the 2006 season, Johnson saw little activity. After being bogged down by an early injury, his productivity endured a sharp decline. During the first eight weeks of the 2006 season, Johnson caught two touchdown passes, while amassing 483 yards. However, after shaving his Mohawk and changing his mentality, he had a breakout game in a losing effort against the San Diego Chargers. Johnson accumulated 260 receiving yards and scored two touchdowns, which broke the previous Bengals record for most receiving yards in a game. He went on to amass 190 receiving yards and three touchdowns in a 31–16 win over the New Orleans Saints in the following week. This gave Johnson a then NFL record of 450 receiving yards in back-to-back games (to be surpassed by Josh Gordon of the Cleveland Browns, who amassed 498 yards in consecutive games in 2013), breaking the previous record of 448 set by San Francisco 49ers receiver John Taylor in 1989. In the following week, he gained 123 yards receiving, breaking the three-game receiving record since the NFL–AFL merger in 1970 and coming within 40 yards of the all-time record.

Johnson finished the 2006 season with 87 receptions for a league leading 1,369 yards and seven touchdowns. He was the first Bengal ever to lead the NFL in receiving yards. Johnson and Houshmandzadeh also became the first Bengals teammates to each amass over 1,000 receiving yards in the same season. He earned Pro Bowl honors for the fourth consecutive season and was first team All-Pro for the second consecutive season.

In addition to being one of the most productive receivers in the NFL, Johnson was also one of the most popular in balloting for the Pro Bowl. In the fan voting for the 2006 game, he finished first in votes for wide receivers, and fourth overall with 987,650 total votes. Johnson earned nationwide attention for his flamboyant attitude, which was often seen during his infamous end zone celebrations after catching touchdown passes. In a list released in August 2006 by Fox Sports listing the top 10 showboats in professional sports, Johnson topped the list.

==== 2007 season ====
In the first game of the season, on Monday Night Football against the Baltimore Ravens, Johnson scored the game's first touchdown on a 39-yard pass from Carson Palmer. Following the touchdown, he grabbed a jacket that resembles the Pro Football Hall of Fame inductees' jacket that said, "Future H.O.F. 20??" Johnson finished the game with five receptions for 95 yards and a touchdown. In the next game, against the Cleveland Browns, he racked up 209 yards on 11 catches for two touchdowns in the 51–45 loss. This gave Johnson a career total of 7,229 receiving yards, breaking the Bengals' franchise record previously held by Isaac Curtis. The very next game, against the Seattle Seahawks, he totaled nine receptions for 138 yards as the Bengals lost again. Against the New York Jets, in which the Bengals won 38–31, Johnson had three receptions for 102 yards and a rush for 15 yards.

In the fourth quarter of the Bengals' week-nine loss to the Buffalo Bills, Johnson was rolled off the field on a stretcher, with a reported head injury. He dove out for a pass, with under a minute left in the 33–21 loss, and then was sandwiched by Donte Whitner and Coy Wire. Johnson was reported to be mobile at the hospital. He finished the game with three catches for 48 yards. A CT scan performed to detect brain injury was negative, and Johnson did not miss any games from the injury.

Over his next two games, Johnson did not score any touchdowns or gain more than 86 yards, but he had a recognized performance in a November 25 win over the Tennessee Titans, catching a career-high 12 passes for 103 yards and three touchdowns. He was named AFC Offensive Player of the Week for his game against the Titans. This gave Johnson over 1,000 receiving yards for the sixth consecutive season, and moved him past Carl Pickens as the Bengals all-time leader in receptions.

By week 15, Johnson and Houshmandzadeh both gained over 1,000 receiving yards for the second year in a row. However, a loss to the San Francisco 49ers that week ensured the team would finish the year with their first losing season since 2002. In the Bengals' season finale, Johnson had four catches for 131 yards and two touchdowns in a win over the Miami Dolphins, giving him 93 receptions for 1,440 yards and 8 touchdowns on the season.

Johnson's 1,440 yards set a new Bengals' franchise record, breaking his own record of 1,432 in 2005. It was the third time that Johnson finished a season with a new Bengals record for receiving yards. His yardage was third most in the NFL, his receptions were 12th most, and his touchdowns were tied for 15th most in the league.

Johnson was passed up for the 2008 Pro Bowl team, which instead selected his teammate T. J. Houshmandzadeh. Due to injury, however, Patriots' receiver Randy Moss was forced to withdraw from the Pro Bowl, and Johnson was selected as his replacement. The selection marked his fifth consecutive Pro Bowl selection. Johnson and Houshmandzadeh became the first pair of Bengals receivers to make the Pro Bowl in the same year.

==== 2008 season ====
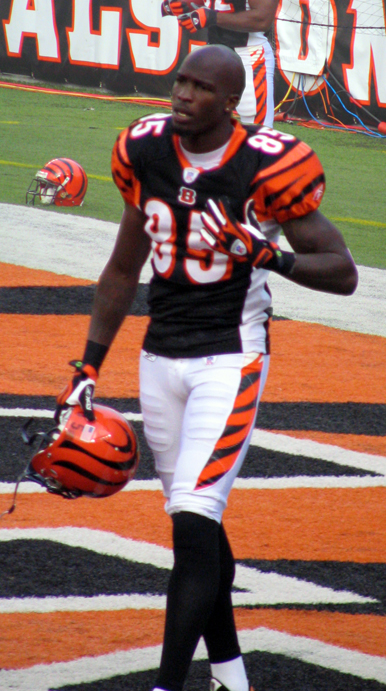
Chad Johnson in 2007.

On January 13, 2008, Johnson was a guest on ESPN's Mike & Mike radio show. During the interview, he addressed how the media and team treated him during the 2007 season, saying, "I was labeled selfish and a cancer, and it hurt...Fingers were pointed at me this year. If the team and the organization wants to further itself (make the playoffs), I think you need to get rid of the problem...It hurt me. To do me that way and not to have my back. Things were said, and nobody came to my defense." However, head coach Marvin Lewis commented on the issue by saying that the Bengals would not be trading Johnson. "He is a Cincinnati Bengal for quite a while," Lewis said.

On February 4, ESPN's Chris Mortensen reported that Johnson felt betrayed by Lewis and was privately threatening to sit out the 2008 season, though his agent Drew Rosenhaus denied it. When asked about trade rumors, Johnson said "Call me, Dan," referring to Redskins' owner Daniel Snyder, On April 22, the Cincinnati Bengals declined a Washington Redskins trade for Johnson involving a first round 2008 selection and a 2009 selection. and on NFL Network's NFL Total Access, Johnson said he did not want a pay raise from the Bengals, but desired a "change of scenery". Lewis stated he had not spoken to Johnson since the last regular season game, and reiterated his lack of interest in a trade. After several weeks of silence, in April, Johnson again announced he wanted to be traded, and caused a rift with teammates by refusing to attend off-season workout programs and practices. Nine days before the opening of the Bengals' mandatory minicamp on June 12, Johnson told ESPN The Magazine that "of course I (will be)" attending, confirmed by his agent. After ankle surgery on June 18, Johnson returned to full practice in August. He suffered a partially torn labrum in the first preseason game on August 17, but decided to play the entire season with the injury.

On August 29, Johnson legally changed his last name to Ochocinco.

The Bengals began the season 0–8, with Carson Palmer forced out for the season with an injury incurred early in the campaign and Johnson experiencing his worst statistical season of his career to date. Johnson totaled 11 receptions for 116 yards and a touchdown in the first four games of the season, unable to gain more than 37 yards receiving in any of the contests. Following a dismal performance (three receptions for 43 yards) against the Dallas Cowboys in a loss, Johnson had consecutive games with 50-yard receiving totals (57 against the New York Giants and 52 against the Pittsburgh Steelers). Johnson then had 44 yards on five receptions in a loss to the Houston Texans.

However, the Bengals won their first game of the season, against the Jacksonville Jaguars, in week 9 by a score of 21–19. In that game, Johnson had two touchdowns, which marked the first multi-touchdown game of the season for Johnson.

Johnson finished the season with 53 catches for 540 yards and four touchdowns — his worst statistical season since his rookie campaign.

==== 2009 season ====
Before the start of the 2009 season, the Philadelphia Eagles and New York Giants expressed interest in Johnson if he were to be placed on the market after he missed voluntary team offseason workouts. In July 2009, Johnson said that he would use Twitter during games, but the NFL banned it. In the August 20 preseason game against the New England Patriots, Johnson took over placekicking duties for the injured Shayne Graham. He kicked off and made an extra point in the game, which ended up deciding the Bengals' 7–6 win.

During the season, Johnson expressed remorse for the developments in the 2008 season and attempted to make it up to the fans in Cincinnati through numerous actions. Many of those involved public appearances (usually involving the publication of his autobiography) and also by inviting Bengals fans to dinner and movie showings through his Twitter account, gatherings for which he picked up the tab. Many of the events were featured on the Bengals' official website.

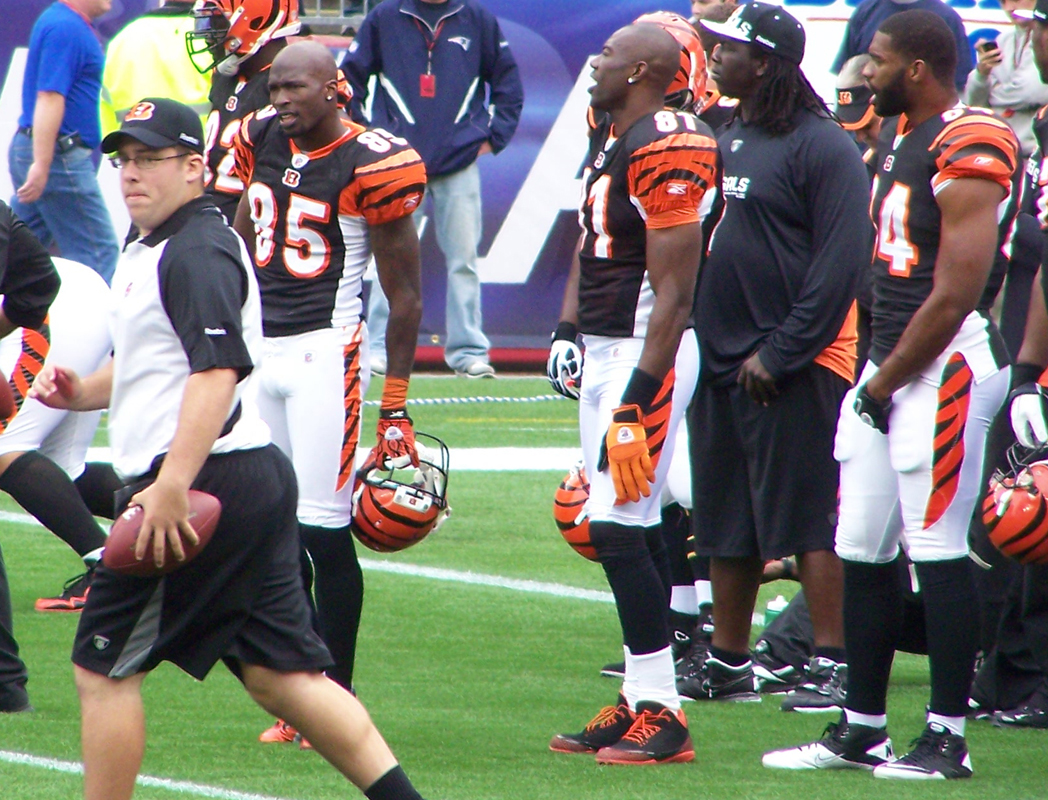
Johnson (left) and Terrell Owens before a game against the New England Patriots on September 12, 2010.

Johnson went on to record his seventh career 1,000 yard season, catching 72 passes for 1,047 yards and nine touchdowns. He finished the season just 48 yards short of the 10,000 career receiving yards milestone and with 62 career touchdown catches, just one short of the franchise record held by Carl Pickens.

On January 15, Johnson was announced as a Pro Bowl selection to replace Patriots receiver Wes Welker, who was injured in the final week of the regular season. It was Johnson's sixth Pro Bowl selection, tying Lemar Parrish for the second highest total in franchise history.

==== 2010 season ====
Johnson opened up the 2010 season with 12 receptions for 159 yards and a touchdown in the Bengals' opening day loss to the Patriots. In doing so, he tied the franchise record for touchdown catches (which he later surpassed) and became the sixth player in NFL history to amass 10,000 receiving yards with one team. The following week, Johnson became the 30th player in NFL history to surpass 700 career receptions, catching four passes for 44 yards in a 15–10 win. He finished the 2010 season with 67 receptions for 831 yards and four touchdowns.

=== New England Patriots ===
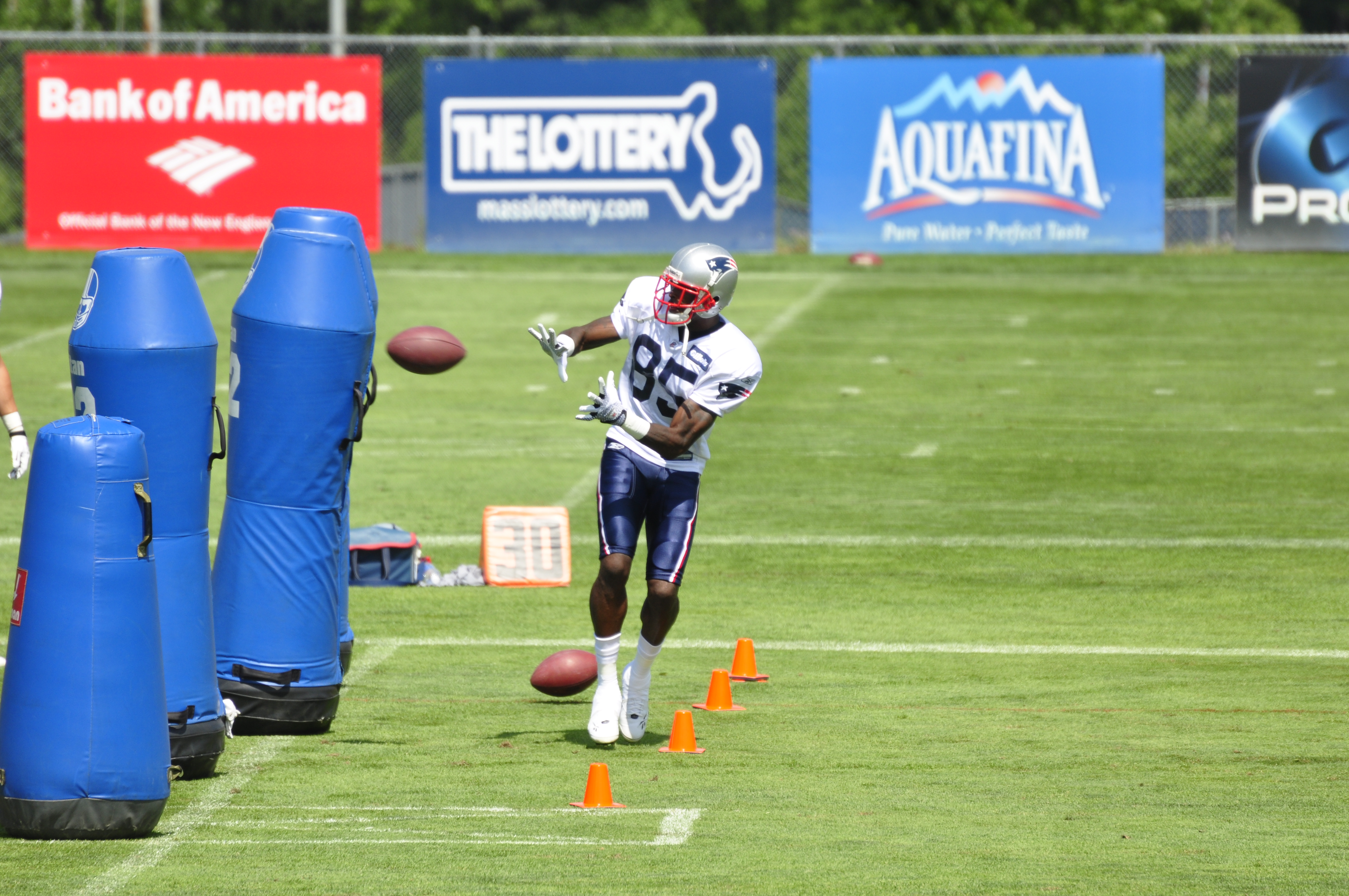
Johnson practicing with the Patriots shortly after being traded to them.

On July 28, 2011, the New England Patriots acquired Johnson in a trade with Cincinnati after he restructured a three-year contract for $6.35 million. The Patriots traded two draft picks, a fifth round pick in 2012 and a sixth round pick in 2013.

Johnson had statistically the least productive season of his career, catching 15 passes for 276 yards and one touchdown, all career lows. He was inactive for the AFC Championship game against the Baltimore Ravens after reportedly attending his father's funeral. Johnson played in his first Super Bowl, catching one pass for 21 yards. His 21-yard reception was the longest pass completion for the Patriots in that Super Bowl. The Patriots lost to the New York Giants 21–17 in Super Bowl XLVI.

On June 7, 2012, Johnson was released by the Patriots.

=== Miami Dolphins ===
Johnson, a Miami native, signed with the Miami Dolphins on June 11, 2012. On July 24, Johnson legally changed his last name from Ochocinco back to Johnson.

The Dolphins released Johnson on August 12 following his arrest the previous night. The meeting in which head coach Joe Philbin notified Johnson of his release from the Dolphins was shown in the episode of HBO's Hard Knocks that originally aired on August 14.

=== Montreal Alouettes ===
Johnson signed a two-year deal with the Montreal Alouettes of the Canadian Football League (CFL) on April 17, 2014. During the 2014 CFL season, Johnson appeared in only five regular season games, mostly due to nagging injuries. He missed two playoff games to address a personal family matter in Florida. In total, he accumulated seven receptions for 151 yards and scored one touchdown. Johnson was suspended by the Alouettes after he failed to report for mandatory training camp in the spring of 2015. He remained suspended through the 2015 CFL season. Following the season, Johnson was not offered a new contract by the Alouettes and became a free agent on February 9, 2016.

=== Fundidores de Monterrey ===
In March 2017, the Liga de Fútbol Americano Profesional (LFA) announced that Johnson would play one game for the Dinos de Saltillo. However, hours later, it was announced that he would instead suit up for the Fundidores de Monterrey. On April 2, 2017, Johnson caught three passes, including a 41-yard touchdown reception, in a 14–6 win over the Dinos at the Estadio Tecnológico in Monterrey.

== Career statistics ==
Legend
	Led the league
**Bold**	Career high

=== NFL ===
Regular season

Year	Team	Games		Receiving					Rushing					Fumbles	
Year	Team	GP	GS	Rec	Yds	Avg	Lng	TD	Att	Yds	Avg	Lng	TD	Fum	Lost
2001	CIN	12	3	28	329	11.9	28	1	—	—	—	—	—	0	0
2002	CIN	16	14	69	1,166	16.9	72	5	—	—	—	—	—	0	0
2003	CIN	16	14	90	1,355	15.1	**82**	**10**	—	—	—	—	—	0	0
2004	CIN	16	16	95	1,274	13.4	53	9	4	39	9.8	18	0	1	0
2005	CIN	16	16	**97**	1,432	14.8	70	9	5	33	6.6	11	0	1	0
2006	CIN	16	16	87	1,369	15.7	74	7	**6**	24	4.0	8	0	1	1
2007	CIN	16	16	93	**1,440**	15.5	70	8	**6**	**47**	7.8	16	0	**2**	1
2008	CIN	13	10	53	540	10.2	26	4	—	—	—	—	—	0	0
2009	CIN	16	15	72	1,047	14.5	50	9	3	32	**10.7**	**26**	0	**2**	**2**
2010	CIN	14	12	67	831	12.4	42	4	—	—	—	—	—	0	0
2011	NE	16	3	15	276	**18.4**	53	1	—	—	—	—	—	0	0
Total		167	135	766	11,059	14.4	82	67	24	175	7.3	26	0	7	4

Postseason

Year	Team	Games		Receiving					Fumbles	
Year	Team	GP	GS	Rec	Yds	Avg	Lng	TD	Fum	Lost
2005	CIN	1	1	**4**	**59**	14.8	**24**	0	0	0
2009	CIN	1	1	2	28	14.0	19	0	0	0
2011	NE	2	0	1	21	**21.0**	21	0	0	0
Total		4	2	7	108	15.4	24	0	0	0

=== CFL ===
Year	Team	GP	Receiving					Fumbles	
Year	Team	GP	Rec	Yds	Avg	Lng	TD	Fum	Lost
2014	MTL	5	7	151	21.6	46	1	0	0
2015	MTL	Suspended							
Total		5	7	151	21.6	46	1	0	0

=== College ===
==== Community college ====
Year	Team	GP	Receiving			
Year	Team	GP	Rec	Yds	Avg	TD
1997	Santa Monica	10	36	528	**14.7**	3
1998	Santa Monica	DNP (Ineligible)				
1999	Santa Monica	10	**63**	**862**	13.7	**6**
Career		20	99	1,390	14.0	9

==== FBS ====
Year	Team	Games		Receiving			
Year	Team	GP	GS	Rec	Yds	Avg	TD
2000	Oregon State	12	11	37	806	21.8	8
Career		12	11	37	806	21.8	8

== Career highlights ==
=== Awards and honors ===
- AFC champion (2011)
- 2× First-team All-Pro (2005–2006)
- Second-team All-Pro (2003)
- 6× Pro Bowl (2003–2007, 2009)
- NFL receiving yards leader (2006)
- 10,000 receiving yards club
- Cincinnati Bengals Ring of Honor
- Cincinnati Bengals 40th Anniversary Team
- Cincinnati Bengals 50th Anniversary Team

=== Bengals franchise records ===
- Career receptions (751)
- Career receiving yards (10,783)
- Career receiving touchdowns (66)
- Career yards from scrimmage (10,958)
- Career All-Purpose Yds (10,964)
- Career games with 100+ receiving yards (31)
- Career Games with 1+ touchdown (50)
- Career 1,000+ receiving yard seasons (7)"Most seasons with at least 1,000 receiving yards, Cincinnati Bengals". StatMuse.

== Post-playing career ==
In March 2016, Johnson tweeted to the Cleveland Browns head coach, who was also his former wide receivers coach with the Bengals, Hue Jackson, to ask if he would let Johnson work with the receivers during training camp. In July 2016, Jackson agreed to have Johnson work as a guest instructor for the Browns. Jackson admitted that Johnson wants to "try his hand" at coaching.

He is currently a panelist on the weekly highlight show Inside the NFL, a role he has held since the show moved to The CW in 2023. He also co-hosts the podcast Nightcap alongside Shannon Sharpe and Joe Johnson. In December 2024, he served as "ratings adjuster" for the EA Sports Madden broadcast of an NFL game.

== Soccer career ==
Due to the 2011 NFL Lockout, on March 16, 2011, Johnson announced he would have a four-day trial for Sporting Kansas City of Major League Soccer. Johnson was a soccer player in his youth and has stated he is an avid fan of the sport. His trial began on March 23, 2011. On March 25, he was asked to play in a reserve game. On March 29, he was not offered a contract by the team but was offered the chance to train with the reserve side to stay in shape.

In 2018, Johnson returned to soccer, signing for then-National Premier Soccer League side Boca Raton FC in October after a period of training. He made his debut for the club, playing as a forward, in a 1–0 win over Himmarshee FC. He scored his first goal for the club on October 20, 2018, netting a penalty in a 2–0 win over FC Boca Predators.

On March 12, 2019, Johnson re-signed with Boca Raton FC for the 2019 Spring UPSL season after the team joined the United Premier Soccer League. On May 24, 2019, Johnson scored both goals in a 2–1 regular season win over the Palm Beach Breakers. Boca Raton FC would go on to win the South Florida Championship of the UPSL.

Johnson was an analyst for Fox Sports during the 2022 FIFA World Cup.

In 2023, he took part in The Soccer Tournament, playing for Nati SC, a team mostly composed of former FC Cincinnati players.

== Other pursuits ==
=== Acting and advertising ===
In 2010, Chad Johnson played himself on the Season 2 premiere of the television show The League and appeared in the music video for R&B artist Monica's single "Everything to Me". Johnson also voiced an animated version of himself for an episode of Squidbillies titled "Lean Green Touchdown Makifying Machine". He was credited under his then-current name, Chad Ochocinco. That year, he also appeared in a national pistachio commercial and posed nude with a strategically placed football in PETA's "Ink Not Mink" ad campaign, which encouraged people to choose tattoos over wearing animal fur.

In 2011, Johnson filmed a cameo role as himself for the 2012 film American Reunion and appeared as a former captain of the BMS Goats on the Season 3 premiere of Blue Mountain State.

=== Reality television ===
On March 1, 2010, it was announced that Johnson would be a contestant on Dancing with the Stars for the tenth season. He was paired with two-time champion Cheryl Burke. The season premiere was on Monday, March 22, 2010. He was eliminated from the show as one of the final four competitors on May 18, 2010, after receiving the lowest judges' score and number of votes. He was the 100th contestant to be eliminated in the show's history.

Later that year, Johnson starred in his own reality television dating show, Ochocinco: The Ultimate Catch, on VH1. Aspiring singer-songwriter Rubi Pazmino won the show. Fellow NFL wide receivers Terrell Owens and Bernard Berrian were occasionally featured on the show, advising Johnson throughout the process.

Johnson appeared with his mother Paula on the WeTV reality show "Marriage Bootcamp Reality Stars: Family Edition." The show, which premiered April 28, 2017, deals with unconventional therapy.

=== Sports media ===
Johnson appeared on the cover of EA's 2006 video game NFL Street 3. He provided narration alongside with Clinton Portis and Byron Leftwich.

Johnson had his own segment on Sports Soup titled "Child, Please".

During the 2010-2011 NFL season, he and teammate Terrell Owens teamed up for a talk show, The T. Ocho Show on Versus, talking football, basketball, and pop culture. The show was cancelled in 2011 as a result of Comcast's plans to re-launch Versus as an NBC Sports-branded service, as its new staff did not feel that the show would fit with the network's new goals.

=== Combat sports ===
Johnson was featured as the guest host of WWE Raw on September 13, 2010.

On May 3, 2021, Johnson was added to the undercard for the Floyd Mayweather Jr. vs. Logan Paul fight card in a fight against Brian Maxwell. The fight, which was scheduled for four two-minute rounds, went the distance. Because the match was an exhibition with no scorecards, and neither fighter scored a knockout, no winner was declared.

In October 2024, Johnson announced that he would be fighting former Pittsburgh Steelers star James Harrison in an exhibition mixed martial arts fight in February 2025.

=== Professional Bull Riders event ===
In May 2011, Johnson announced via his Twitter account that he would attempt to participate in a PBR event in Duluth, Georgia. He rode Deja Blue, a 1500-pound bull, for lasted 1.5 seconds during the intermission of a Professional Bull Riders event on May 14.

=== Smartphone app ===
An iPhone game called Mad Chad was designed by both Johnson and RockLive and released on November 18, 2010. It was featured on iTunes and was a popular downloaded app in 2010.

== Personal life ==
Johnson is widely known for his frugality and focus on financial responsibility. For the first two years of Johnson's tenure with the Bengals, he lived at the Bengals' stadium Paycor Stadium, utilizing the variety of on-site amenities the team provided. When new coach Marvin Lewis took over in Johnson's third season, Lewis told him to find his own space. Johnson went viral on Shannon Sharpe's podcast Club Shay Shay in 2023 for his decision to use Spirit Airlines over using a private jet, wearing jewelry from Claire's, and using McDonald's as a first date location.

Johnson has eight children. His son, Chad Jr., is a wide receiver at Arizona State University. His cousin, Brandon Johnson is a wide receiver.

Johnson became engaged in January 2023. He and his fiancé have a daughter who was born in January 2022.

In May 2007, Johnson was sued for allegedly not giving away a Lexus that was supposed to be raffled off. The suit added two plaintiffs who claimed that they had won trips from Johnson (one to Europe, the other to Hawaii), that Johnson never awarded.

Johnson has interests in sports outside of football. In June 2007, he footraced against a Thoroughbred racehorse over a furlong (220 yards / 200 meters) for charity; Johnson, given a 110-yard (100 m) head start, beat the horse by twelve lengths. He is a Napoli supporter. Johnson constantly shows his support for several soccer teams on his official Twitter account. In March 2015, Johnson garnered attention as he was involved in a tweeting exchange with the Buffalo Sabres of the NHL regarding the acquisition of Chad Johnson, the goaltender of the same name.

Johnson is an avid player of the FIFA video game series, frequently referring to himself as "FIFA king". He also frequently accepts challenges from fans on Twitter and even occasionally, when traveling, will go over to people's houses and play them.

=== Name changes ===
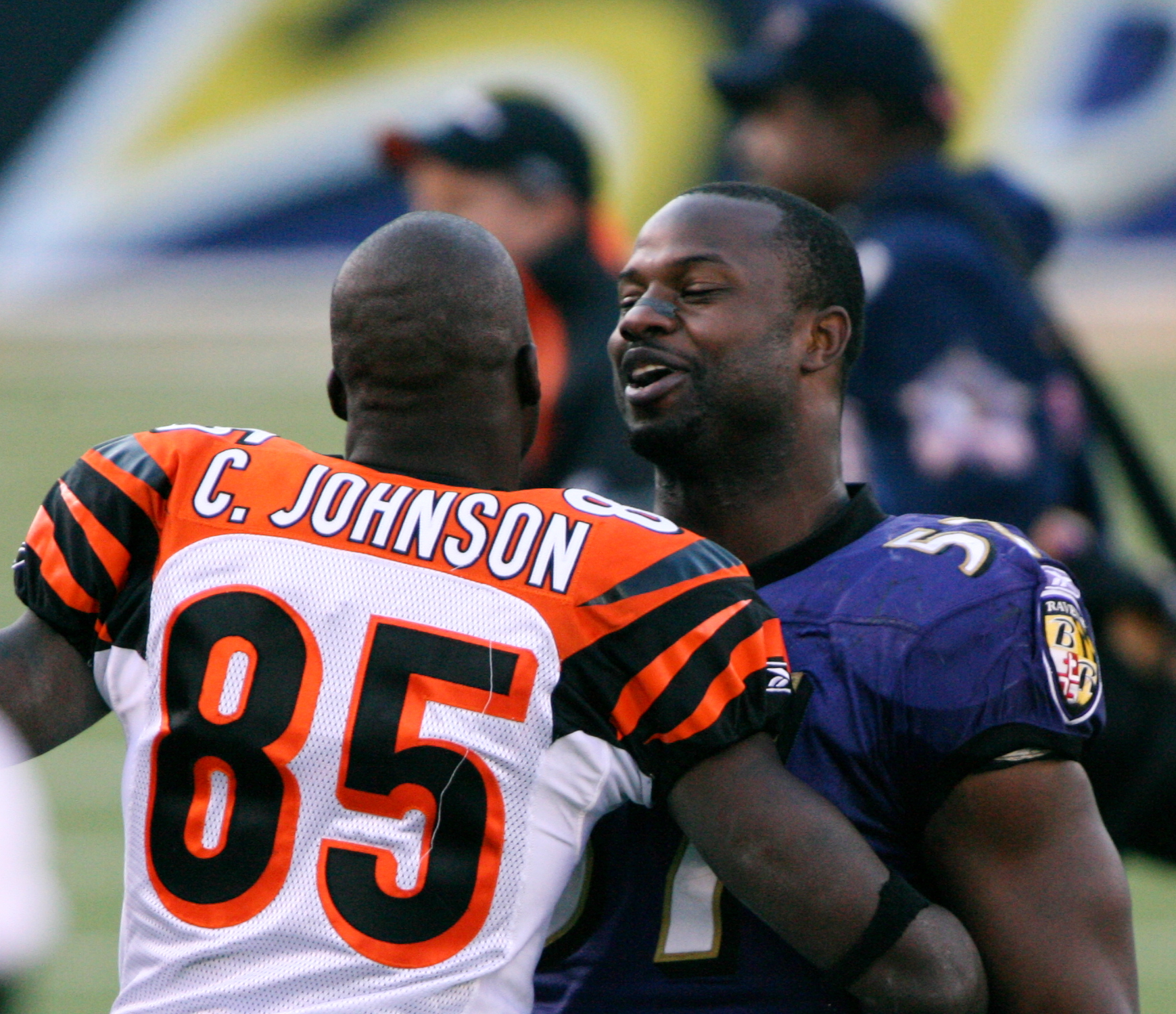
Johnson and Bart Scott exchanging pleasantries after a game in 2006.

On October 25, 2006, in honor of Hispanic Heritage Month, Johnson, whose jersey number was "85", announced that he would prefer to be called "Ocho Cinco," which is "eight five" in Spanish ("Eighty-five" would be "ochenta y cinco"). During warm-ups for the October 29, 2006, game against the Atlanta Falcons, the back of his jersey read "Ocho Cinco" instead of "C. Johnson." Quarterback Carson Palmer ripped the label off the jersey to reveal the usual "C. Johnson." According to ESPN, Johnson was fined $5,000 for the stunt despite the fact that he did not wear the "Ocho Cinco" name tag during the game.

Johnson legally changed his name to Chad Javon Ochocinco on August 29, 2008. The Cincinnati Bengals decided to allow him to have it on the back of his jersey, though he continued to wear his old "C. Johnson" jersey during the 2008 football season because of contractual obligations with Reebok. He played with "OCHOCINCO" on the back of his jersey from the 2009 season to the 2011 season. He wanted it to read "OCHO CINCO" but the NFL would only allow his legal name as spelled on his name change paperwork.

Johnson announced on his live USTREAM broadcast in 2009 that he would be legally changing his last name to "Hachi Go" in 2010. He also held up a customized Cincinnati Bengals jersey with the last name "Hachi Go" on the back. Just as the words Ocho Cinco translate to 8 and 5 in Spanish, the words Hachi Go (八五) translate to 8 and 5 in Japanese. He did not go through with the name change.

On January 25, 2011, he told an ESPN reporter that he would be changing his last name back to Johnson; however, on June 30, 2011, he told an ESPN reporter that due to financial issues he would remain Chad Ochocinco for the time being. On July 23, 2012, after his move to the Miami Dolphins, he legally changed his name to Chad Ochocinco Johnson at a Broward County courthouse because he "wanted to reconnect with his former self."

=== Marriage and arrest ===
On November 16, 2010, Johnson proposed to Basketball Wives star Evelyn Lozada, whom he had been dating since earlier in the year. Johnson and Lozada married on July 4, 2012.

On August 11, 2012, Johnson was arrested on a charge of domestic battery according to the Davie, Florida police. Johnson allegedly headbutted Lozada following an argument. Johnson was released the following afternoon on $2,500 bond. Later that day, he was released by the Miami Dolphins. Three days later, Lozada filed for divorce claiming that her marriage was "irretrievably broken." The divorce was finalized on September 19. On September 21, Johnson entered a plea of no contest to misdemeanor domestic battery, avoiding jail time in an agreement with prosecutors and Lozada. Johnson received a year of probation.

A warrant was issued for Johnson's arrest for allegedly violating the terms of his probation on May 7, 2013. According to the Broward County Sheriff's Office, Johnson failed to meet with probation specialists on February 15 and March 15 and failed to show proof of enrollment and completion of a batterers intervention program. On May 20, Johnson turned himself in and was released later in the day after posting a $1,000 bond. On June 10, Johnson was sentenced to thirty days in jail for violating his probation. Although a plea deal that called for no jail time was reached, Judge Kathleen McHugh rejected it after Johnson playfully slapped his male attorney on the buttocks in court. Despite Johnson having apologized, the judge said that Johnson was not taking things seriously enough. In addition to the jail sentence, his probation was extended for three months through December and he was required to perform 25 hours of community service and to undergo two counseling sessions per week. Johnson was released from jail after apologizing to the court on June 17.
