= Big Noon Kickoff =

College football studio show

- Logo used since 2019
- Genre: Pre-game show
- Presented by: Rob Stone; Mike Hill (fill-in)
- Starring: Mark Ingram II; Matt Leinart; Brady Quinn; Urban Meyer; Charles Woodson; Clay Travis; Tom Verducci; Bruce Feldman; Tom Rinaldi; Chris Fallica
- Opening theme: Fox CFB Theme "Boom" by X Ambassadors
- Ending theme: Same as opening
- Country of origin: United States
- Original language: English
- No. of seasons: 8 (through 2026 season)

Production
- Production locations: Fox Network Center (Fox Studio Lot Building 101), 10201 W Pico Blvd, Century City, Los Angeles, California; Various NCAA stadiums (for road shows)
- Camera setup: Multi-camera
- Running time: 120 minutes 180 minutes (special on–location broadcasts)
- Production companies: National Collegiate Athletic Association; Fox Sports

Original release
- Network: Fox; FS1 (weekly simulcasts)
- Release: August 31, 2019 – present

Related
- Fox College Football; Fox NFL Sunday

Big Noon Kickoff is an American college football studio show broadcast by Fox and simulcast on sister network Fox Sports 1 (FS1). Premiering on August 31, 2019, it serves as the pre-game show for Fox College Football and in particular, Big Noon Saturday—the network's weekly 12:00 p.m ET/9:00 a.m PT kickoff window.

It is hosted by Rob Stone, and features former national champion and 2004 Heisman Trophy winning USC Trojans quarterback Matt Leinart, former national champion and 2009 Heisman Trophy winning Alabama running back Mark Ingram II, former Notre Dame Fighting Irish quarterback Brady Quinn, former Bowling Green, Utah, Florida, Ohio State coach Urban Meyer, and Barstool Sports' Dave Portnoy as panelists, with Bruce Feldman acting as Fox's CFB insider, as well as Tom Verducci, who usually does baseball for Fox, and Tom Rinaldi, both working on feature reports. Radio host Clay Travis serves as a contributor, and 1997 Heisman Trophy winner and former Michigan Wolverines cornerback Charles Woodson will also join the show on select weeks, most notably if Michigan is featured.

== History ==
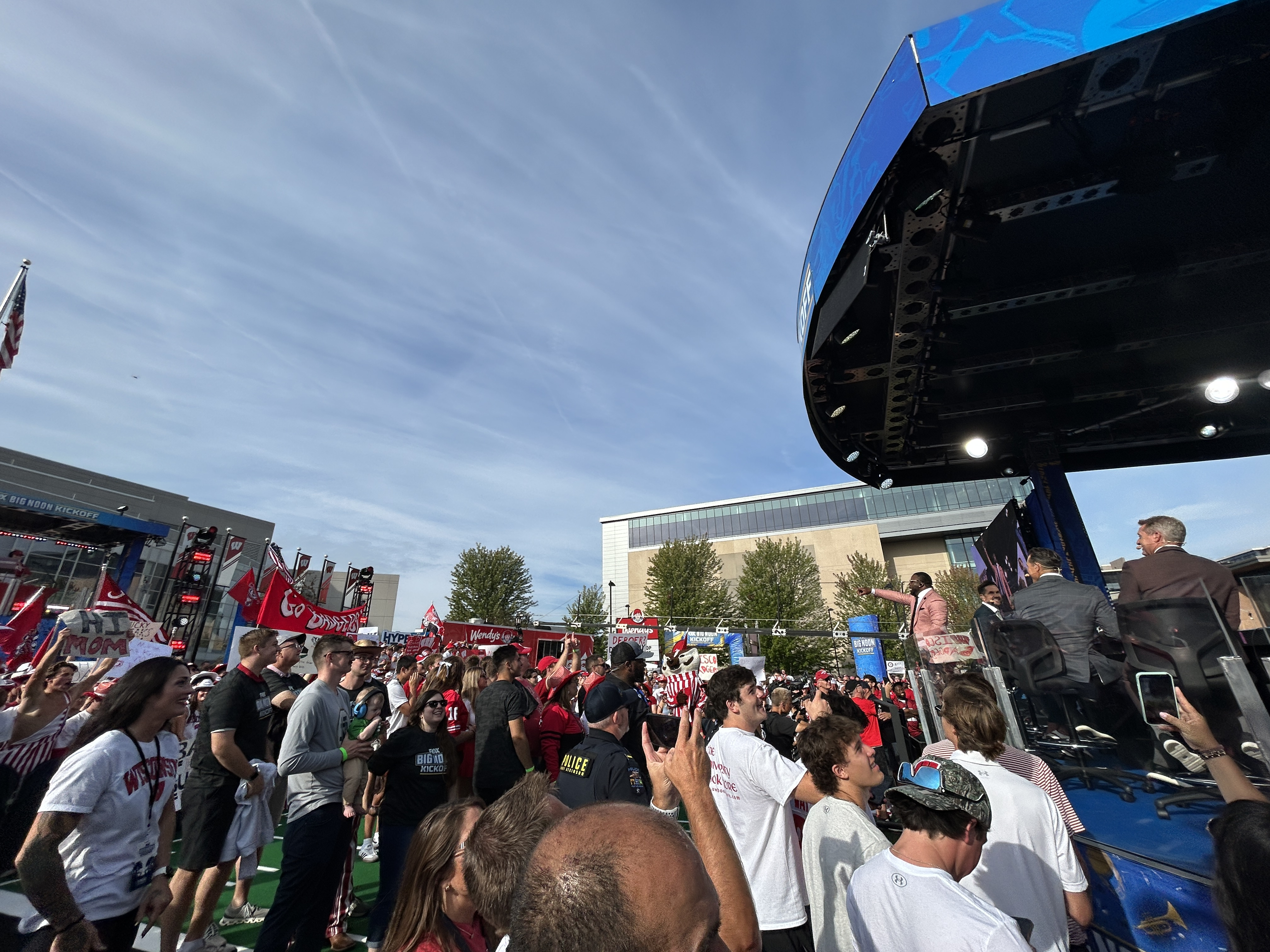
September 14, 2024 broadcast from Madison, Wisconsin

In the 2013 season, Fox aired a college football pre-game show on its newly launched Fox Sports 1 channel, Fox College Saturday. The program was unable to compete with ESPN's popular and established College GameDay, with Fox only being able to sustain an average viewership of 70,000. The show was cancelled after a single season, and its role was supplanted by the Friday-night edition of Fox Sports Live.

Fox introduced the Big Noon Saturday window for its college football coverage in the 2019 season; the network had aired occasional noon kickoffs during the season before (including, after having acquired the Big Ten's primary football rights in 2017, the Michigan–Ohio State rivalry), and they were among Fox's top-viewed games in the 2018 season. Fox has positioned the timeslot as featuring one of its flagship games of the day. Fox made that decision in order to boost their ratings by avoiding competition with CBS that has their featured SEC (until 2023 with the game moving to ABC and CBS replacing it with Big Ten football games in its place from 2024 onward) game of the week in the 3:30 p.m. timeslot, and ABC with their featured game in primetime. Big Noon Kickoff was henceforth introduced as a pre-game show for the new window.

Sports Illustrated described the show as being "built around" Urban Meyer (who retired as head coach of the Ohio State Buckeyes at the end of the 2018 season, and had previously been an ESPN analyst). Meyer stated that he had prepared for the role by studying clips of Fox's NFL pre-game show Fox NFL Sunday, and Alex Rodriguez (who joined ESPN's Sunday Night Baseball in 2018), as an example of another player-turned-television analyst. Fox executive producer Brad Zager explained that his presence was meant to help provide "intelligent dialogue" to the show.

For the 2020 season, the program was expanded to two hours. On November 4, 2020, for undisclosed reasons citing Centers for Disease Control and Prevention and Los Angeles County Department of Health Services guidance, Fox announced that the November 7, 2020 edition of Big Noon Kickoff would not feature the program's usual panel, and that the program would be shortened to one hour. The guest panel was led by Fox NFL Kickoff host Charissa Thompson, joined by Fox NFL Sunday analysts Terry Bradshaw and Howie Long, and Emmanuel Acho from Fox Sports 1's Speak for Yourself. On November 12, Meyer revealed that he had recently recovered from a COVID-19 infection.

Meyer left after the 2020 season to take the Jacksonville Jaguars head coaching job, and was replaced by former Oklahoma Sooners head coach Bob Stoops for the 2021 season. Meyer was fired by the Jaguars after a controversial 13-game tenure and returned to the show for the 2022 season replacing Stoops. Bush left after the 2022 season, with 2009 Heisman Trophy winner running back Mark Ingram II joining the cast for the 2023 season.

In the 2025 season, Barstool Sports owner Dave Portnoy joined Big Noon Kickoff as a regular panelist, and other Barstool Sports personalities began to appear as contributors. Media analysts characterized the hire—which came as part of a larger deal between Fox Sports and Barstool—as being a response to ESPN's addition of Pat McAfee to College GameDay, as both personalities had significant followings among young adults and via digital media. On October 2, 2026, it was announced that Portnoy and Barstool Sports personalities will no longer appear on Big Noon Kickoff.

== Reception ==
The Big Lead felt that Big Noon Kickoff showed promise, but that the show's "formal" and "corporate" atmosphere (in comparison to the "casual fun" of College GameDay) led to most of the panelists seeming "stiff" on-air, and exacerbated their relative lack of broadcasting experience. Quinn was considered to be a stand-out among the panelists in its premiere broadcast, considering him the most "comfortable" on-air, and noting that both he and Meyer were well-versed at leveraging their past experience to provide insights.

== Viewership ==
During the first episode, the show garnered 838,000 viewers, which amounted to a 0.8 rating. A special two-hour edition of Big Noon Kickoff leading into the Michigan-Ohio State game on November 30, 2019, received a series-high 1.6 overnight rating, beating College GameDay (which drew a 1.54 rating) in its time slot for the first time in the program's history.

== Personalities ==
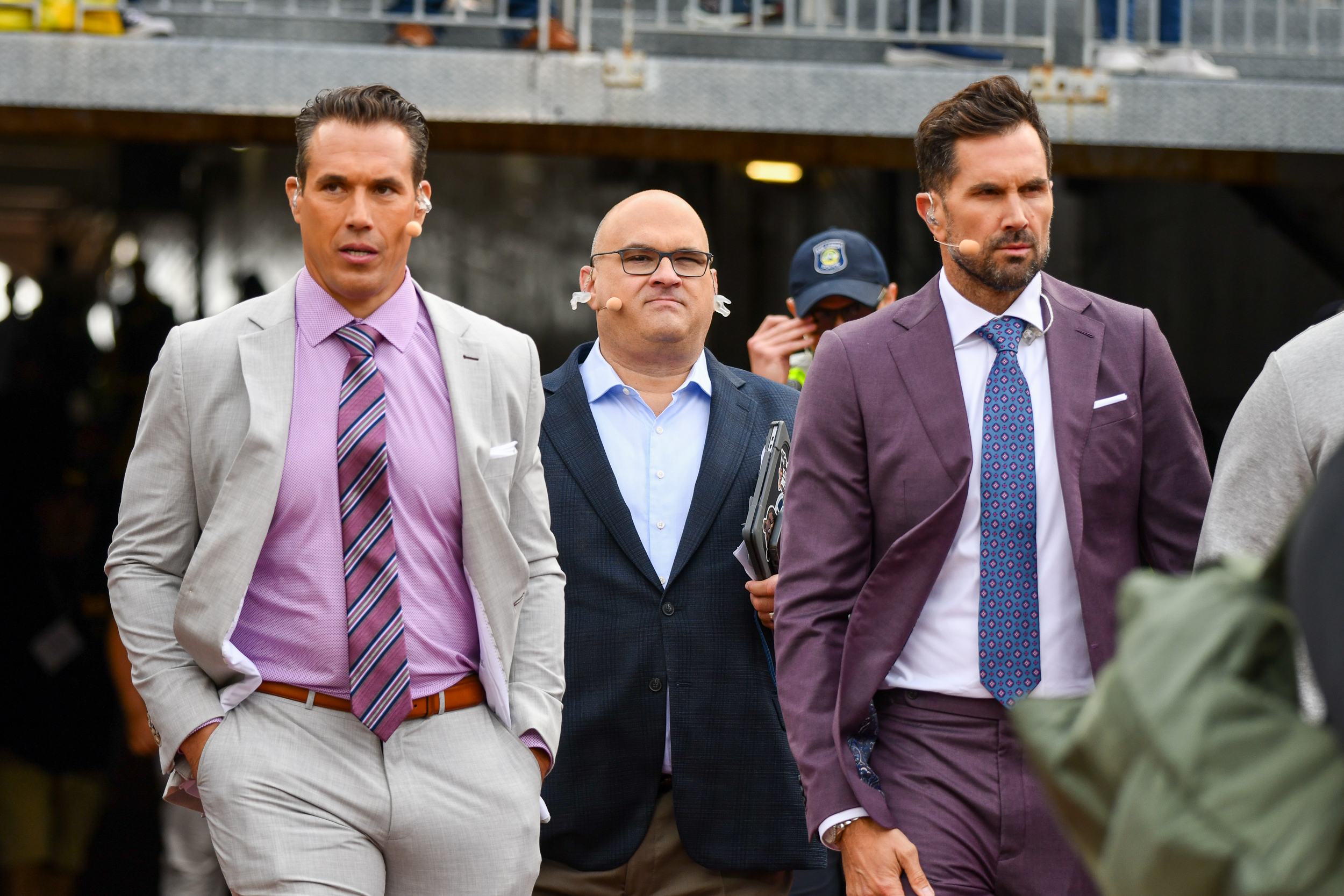
Quinn (left) and Leinart (right) at Michigan Stadium during September 7, 2024 game

=== Current ===
- Rob Stone – host (2019–present)
- Mike Hill – fill-in host (2019–present)
- Mark Ingram II – analyst (2023–present)
- Matt Leinart – analyst (2019–present)
- Brady Quinn – analyst (2019–present)
- Urban Meyer – analyst (2019–2020; 2022–present)
- Charles Woodson – analyst (2019–present)
- Clay Travis – contributor (2019–present)
- Tom Verducci – contributor (2019–present)
- Bruce Feldman – insider (2019–present)
- Tom Rinaldi – reporter (2021–present)
- Chris Fallica – researcher/contributor (2023–present)

=== Former ===
- Reggie Bush – analyst (2019–2022)
- Bob Stoops – analyst (2021)
- Dave Portnoy – analyst (2025–2026)

== On-site broadcasts ==
Initially, unlike its main competitor College GameDay, Big Noon Kickoff originated from Fox Sports' studio in Los Angeles, and only travelled to game sites for marquee games being televised by a Fox network (including major rivalry games and the Big Ten Championship Game). Fox scheduled four road shows in 2020, but only 3 happened, as their scheduled visit to USC was canceled due to Fox holding their crew out that weekend due to COVID-19 protocols, which Urban Meyer later revealed that he dealt with a COVID infection. The first 6 weeks of the 2021 season featured the crew going on the road, a Big Noon Kickoff first. Beginning in the 2022 season, Big Noon Kickoff moved permanently to on-location broadcasts throughout the season.

With Deion Sanders' debut as head coach of the Colorado Buffaloes, Fox broadcast Big Noon Kickoff from Colorado's first three games in the 2023 season; its Week 3 edition was broadcast from Boulder, Colorado for the Rocky Mountain Showdown—which ESPN also chose as its site for College GameDay that week—rather than Penn State at Illinois as originally scheduled, marking the first time that Big Noon Kickoff was broadcast from the same site for two consecutive weeks, and the first time that it was broadcast from the site of a game not televised by Fox.

=== 2019 season ===
Date	Visiting team		Home team		Location	City	Notes
September 20	10 Utah	23	**USC**	**30**	Los Angeles Memorial Coliseum	Los Angeles, CA	9:00 p.m. ET kickoff
October 12	6 **Oklahoma**	**34**	11 Texas	27	Cotton Bowl	Dallas, TX	Red River Rivalry
October 26	13 Wisconsin	7	**3 Ohio State**	**38**	Ohio Stadium	Columbus, OH	
November 23	8 Penn State	17	**2 Ohio State**	**28**	Ohio Stadium	Columbus, OH	Rivalry
November 30	**1 Ohio State**	**56**	13 Michigan	27	Michigan Stadium	Ann Arbor, MI	The Game
December 7	**1 Ohio State**	**34**	8 Wisconsin	21	Lucas Oil Stadium	Indianapolis, IN	Big Ten Championship Game

=== 2020 season ===
Date	Visiting team		Home team		Location	City	Notes
October 24	Nebraska	17	**5 Ohio State**	**52**	Ohio Stadium	Columbus, OH	
November 21	9 Indiana	35	**3 Ohio State**	**42**	Ohio Stadium	Columbus, OH	
December 19	15 Northwestern	10	**4 Ohio State**	**22**	Lucas Oil Stadium	Indianapolis, IN	Big Ten Championship Game

=== 2021 season ===
Date	Visiting team		Home team		Location	City	Notes
September 2	**4 Ohio State**	**45**	Minnesota	31	Huntington Bank Stadium	Minneapolis, MN	8:00 p.m. ET kickoff
September 4	**19 Penn State**	**16**	12 Wisconsin	10	Camp Randall Stadium	Madison, WI	
September 11	**12 Oregon**	**35**	3 Ohio State	28	Ohio Stadium	Columbus, OH	
September 18	Nebraska	16	**3 Oklahoma**	**23**	Gaylord Family Oklahoma Memorial Stadium	Norman, OK	Rivalry
September 25	18 Wisconsin	13	**12 Notre Dame**	**41**	Soldier Field	Chicago, IL	Shamrock Series
October 2	**14 Michigan**	**38**	Wisconsin	17	Camp Randall Stadium	Madison, WI	
October 9	4 Penn State	20	**3 Iowa**	**23**	Kinnick Stadium	Iowa City, IA	4:00 p.m. ET kickoff
October 30	6 Michigan	33	**8 Michigan State**	**37**	Spartan Stadium	East Lansing, MI	Rivalry
November 13	8 Oklahoma	14	**13 Baylor**	**27**	McLane Stadium	Waco, TX	
November 20	Iowa State	21	**13 Oklahoma**	**28**	Gaylord Family Oklahoma Memorial Stadium	Norman, OK	
November 27	2 Ohio State	27	**5 Michigan**	**42**	Michigan Stadium	Ann Arbor, MI	The Game
December 4	**2 Michigan**	**42**	13 Iowa	3	Lucas Oil Stadium	Indianapolis, IN	Big Ten Championship Game

=== 2022 season ===
Date	Visiting team		Home team		Location	City	Notes
September 1	**Penn State**	**35**	Purdue	31	Ross–Ade Stadium	West Lafayette, IN	
September 10	**1 Alabama**	**20**	Texas	19	DKR–Texas Memorial Stadium	Austin, TX	
September 17	**6 Oklahoma**	**49**	Nebraska	14	Memorial Stadium	Lincoln, NE	Rivalry
September 24	Maryland	27	**4 Michigan**	**34**	Michigan Stadium	Ann Arbor, MI	
October 1	**4 Michigan**	**27**	Iowa	14	Kinnick Stadium	Iowa City, IA	
October 8	**4 Michigan**	**31**	Indiana	10	Memorial Stadium	Bloomington, IN	
October 15	10 Penn State	17	**5 Michigan**	**41**	Michigan Stadium	Ann Arbor, MI	Rivalry
October 22	Iowa	10	**2 Ohio State**	**54**	Ohio Stadium	Columbus, OH	
October 29	**2 Ohio State**	**44**	13 Penn State	31	Beaver Stadium	University Park, PA	Rivalry
November 5	Texas Tech	24	**7 TCU**	**34**	Amon G. Carter Stadium	Fort Worth, TX	Rivalry
November 12	Indiana	14	**2 Ohio State**	**56**	Ohio Stadium	Columbus, OH	
November 19	**4 TCU**	**29**	Baylor	28	McLane Stadium	Waco, TX	Rivalry
November 26	**3 Michigan**	**45**	2 Ohio State	23	Ohio Stadium	Columbus, OH	The Game
December 2	**11 Utah**	**47**	4 USC	24	Allegiant Stadium	Paradise, NV	Pac-12 Championship Game
December 3	Purdue	22	**2 Michigan**	**43**	Lucas Oil Stadium	Indianapolis, IN	Big Ten Championship Game

=== 2023 season ===
Date	Visiting team		Home team		Location	City	Notes
August 31	Nebraska	10	**Minnesota**	**13**	Huntington Bank Stadium	Minneapolis, MN	Rivalry
September 2	**Colorado**	**45**	17 TCU	42	Amon G. Carter Stadium	Fort Worth, TX	
September 9	Nebraska	14	**22 Colorado**	**36**	Folsom Field	Boulder, CO	Rivalry
September 16	Colorado State	35	**18 Colorado**	**43**^{2OT}	Folsom Field	Boulder, CO	Rivalry; game televised by ESPN at 10:00 p.m. ET; originally scheduled to broadcast from Champaign, Illinois
September 23	**16 Oklahoma**	**20**	Cincinnati	6	Nippert Stadium	Cincinnati, OH	
September 30	**8 USC**	**48**	Colorado	41	Folsom Field	Boulder, CO	
October 7	Maryland	17	**4 Ohio State**	**37**	Ohio Stadium	Columbus, OH	
October 14	10 USC	20	**21 Notre Dame**	**48**	Notre Dame Stadium	South Bend, IN	Rivalry; game televised by NBC at 7:30 p.m. ET
October 21	7 Penn State	12	**3 Ohio State**	**20**	Ohio Stadium	Columbus, OH	Rivalry
October 28	6 Oklahoma	33	**Kansas**	**38**	David Booth Kansas Memorial Stadium	Lawrence, KS	
November 4	23 Kansas State	30	**7 Texas**	**33**^{OT}	DKR–Texas Memorial Stadium	Austin, TX	
November 11	**3 Michigan**	**24**	10 Penn State	15	Beaver Stadium	University Park, PA	Rivalry
November 18	**3 Michigan**	**31**	Maryland	24	SECU Stadium	College Park, MD	
November 25	2 Ohio State	24	**3 Michigan**	**30**	Michigan Stadium	Ann Arbor, MI	The Game
December 2	**2 Michigan**	**26**	16 Iowa	0	Lucas Oil Stadium	Indianapolis, IN	Big Ten Championship Game

=== 2024 season ===
Date	Visiting team		Home team		Location	City	Notes
August 31	**8 Penn State**	**34**	West Virginia	12	Milan Puskar Stadium	Morgantown, WV	Rivalry
September 7	**3 Texas**	**31**	10 Michigan	12	Michigan Stadium	Ann Arbor, MI	
September 14	**4 Alabama**	**42**	Wisconsin	10	Camp Randall Stadium	Madison, WI	
September 21	Marshall	14	**3 Ohio State**	**49**	Ohio Stadium	Columbus, OH	
September 28	**Colorado**	**48**	UCF	21	Acrisure Bounce House	Orange County, FL	3:30 p.m. ET kickoff
October 5	UCLA	11	**7 Penn State**	**27**	Beaver Stadium	University Park, PA	
October 12	Arizona	19	**14 BYU**	**41**	LaVell Edwards Stadium	Provo, UT	4:00 p.m. ET kickoff
October 19	Nebraska	7	**16 Indiana**	**56**	Memorial Stadium	Bloomington, IN	
October 26	Nebraska	17	**4 Ohio State**	**21**	Ohio Stadium	Columbus, OH	
November 2	**4 Ohio State**	**20**	3 Penn State	13	Beaver Stadium	University Park, PA	Rivalry
November 9	**20 Colorado**	**41**	Texas Tech	27	Jones AT&T Stadium	Lubbock, TX	4:00 p.m. ET kickoff
November 16	Utah	24	**17 Colorado**	**49**	Folsom Field	Boulder, CO	Rivalry
November 23	5 Indiana	15	**2 Ohio State**	**38**	Ohio Stadium	Columbus, OH	
November 30	**Michigan**	**13**	2 Ohio State	10	Ohio Stadium	Columbus, OH	The Game
December 6	20 UNLV	7	**10 Boise State**	**21**	Albertsons Stadium	Boise, ID	Mountain West Championship Game

=== 2025 season ===
Date	Visiting team		Home team		Location	City	Notes
August 30	1 Texas	7	**3 Ohio State**	**14**	Ohio Stadium	Columbus, OH	
September 6	Iowa	13	**16 Iowa State**	**16**	Jack Trice Stadium	Ames, IA	Rivalry
September 13	**4 Oregon**	**34**	Northwestern	14	Martin Stadium	Evanston, IL	
September 20	**17 Texas Tech**	**34**	16 Utah	10	Rice–Eccles Stadium	Salt Lake City, UT	
September 27	21 USC	32	**23 Illinois**	**34**	Gies Memorial Stadium	Champaign, IL	
October 4	Wisconsin	10	**20 Michigan**	**24**	Michigan Stadium	Ann Arbor, MI	
October 11	**1 Ohio State**	**34**	17 Illinois	16	Gies Memorial Stadium	Champaign, IL	Rivalry
October 18	23 Utah	21	**15 BYU**	**24**	LaVell Edwards Stadium	Provo, UT	Rivalry; 8:00 p.m. ET kickoff
October 25	UCLA	6	**2 Indiana**	**56**	Memorial Stadium	Bloomington, IN	
November 1	Penn State	14	**1 Ohio State**	**38**	Ohio Stadium	Columbus, OH	Rivalry
November 8	**9 Oregon**	**18**	20 Iowa	16	Kinnick Stadium	Iowa City, IA	Game televised by CBS at 3:30 p.m. ET
November 15	**18 Michigan**	**24**	Northwestern	22	Wrigley Field	Chicago, IL	George Jewett Trophy
November 22	**11 BYU**	**26**	Cincinnati	14	Nippert Stadium	Cincinnati, OH	8:00 p.m. ET kickoff
November 29	**1 Ohio State**	**27**	15 Michigan	9	Michigan Stadium	Ann Arbor, MI	The Game
December 6	**2 Indiana**	**13**	1 Ohio State	10	Lucas Oil Stadium	Indianapolis, IN	Big Ten Championship Game

=== 2026 season ===
Date	Visiting team		Home team		Location	City	Notes
September 5	North Texas	16	**6** **Indiana**	**52**	Memorial Stadium	Bloomington, IN	
September 12	11 Oklahoma	10	**Michigan**	**17**	Michigan Stadium	Ann Arbor, MI	
September 19	**Arizona State**	**24**	Kansas	17	Wembley Stadium	London, England	Union Jack Classic
September 26	Illinois	19	**7** **Ohio State**	**42**	Ohio Stadium	Columbus, OH	Illibuck
October 3	Michigan	14	**Minnesota**	**20**	Huntington Bank Stadium	Minneapolis, MN	Little Brown Jug
October 10	**7** **Indiana**	**20**	Nebraska	17	Memorial Stadium	Lincoln, NE	
October 17	**4** **Ohio State**	**19**	5 Indiana	15	Memorial Stadium	Bloomington, IN	
October 24	**6** **Indiana**	**13**	Michigan	6^{OT}	Michigan Stadium	Ann Arbor, MI	
October 31	25 Wisconsin	0	**Iowa**	**30**	Kinnick Stadium	Iowa City, IA	Rivalry
November 7	**Air Force**	**24**	Army	21	Michie Stadium	West Point, NY	Commander-in-Chief's Trophy; Game televised by CBS at 7:30 p.m. ET
November 14	**2** **Utah**	**40**	23 Arizona	39	Casino Del Sol Stadium	Tucson, AZ	10:30 p.m. ET kickoff
November 21	Truman State	14	**Ferris State**	**45**	Top Taggart Field	Big Rapids, MI	First visit to a Division II program; 2026 Division II Playoffs First Round; Game televised by ESPN+ at 12:32 p.m. ET
November 28	Michigan		Ohio State		Ohio Stadium	Columbus, OH	The Game
December 5	TBD		TBD		Lucas Oil Stadium	Indianapolis, IN	Big Ten Championship Game

Winners listed in bold.

Rankings from AP poll or CFP (once released) at the time of the game.

== On-site appearances by team ==
Appearance(s)	Team	Hosted	Record	Win pct.	Last appearance	Last hosted
29	Ohio State	17	23–6	.793	October 17, 2026	September 26, 2026
23	Michigan	10	17–6	.739	October 24, 2026	October 24, 2026
12	Penn State	4	4–8	.333	November 1, 2025	November 2, 2024
11	Indiana	5	6–5	.500	October 24, 2026	October 17, 2026
8	Iowa	4	2–6	.250	October 31, 2026	October 31, 2026
8	Nebraska	2	0–8	.000	October 10, 2026	October 10, 2026
8	Oklahoma	2	5–3	.625	September 12, 2026	November 20, 2021
8	Wisconsin	3	0–8	.000	October 31, 2026	September 14, 2024
7	Colorado	4	6–1	.857	November 16, 2024	November 16, 2024
6	Utah	1	2–4	.333	November 14, 2026	September 20, 2025
5	Texas	2	2–3	.400	August 30, 2025	November 4, 2023
5	USC	1	2–3	.400	September 27, 2025	September 20, 2019
3	BYU	2	3–0	1.000	November 22, 2025	October 18, 2025
3	Illinois	2	1–2	.333	September 26, 2026	October 11, 2025
3	Maryland	1	0–3	.000	November 18, 2023	November 18, 2023
3	Minnesota	3	2–1	.667	October 3, 2026	October 3, 2026
3	Northwestern	1	0–3	.000	November 15, 2025	September 13, 2025
3	Oregon	0	3–0	1.000	November 8, 2025	N/A
3	TCU	2	2–1	.667	September 2, 2023	September 2, 2023
3	Texas Tech	1	1–2	.333	September 20, 2025	November 9, 2024
2	Alabama	0	2–0	1.000	September 14, 2024	N/A
2	Arizona	1	0–2	.000	November 14, 2026	November 14, 2026
2	Baylor	2	1–1	.500	November 19, 2022	November 19, 2022
2	Cincinnati	2	0–2	.000	November 22, 2025	November 22, 2025
2	Iowa State	1	1–1	.500	September 6, 2025	September 6, 2025
2	Kansas	1	1–1	.500	September 19, 2026	October 28, 2023
2	Notre Dame	1	2–0	1.000	October 14, 2023	October 14, 2023
2	Purdue	1	0–2	.000	December 3, 2022	September 1, 2022
2	UCLA	0	0–2	.000	October 25, 2025	N/A
1	Air Force	0	1–0	1.000	November 7, 2026	N/A
1	Arizona State	0	1–0	1.000	September 19, 2026	N/A
1	Army	1	0–1	.000	November 7, 2026	November 7, 2026
1	Boise State	1	1–0	1.000	December 6, 2024	December 6, 2024
1	UCF	1	0–1	.000	September 28, 2024	September 28, 2024
1	Colorado State	0	0–1	.000	September 16, 2023	N/A
1	Ferris State	1	1–0	1.000	November 21, 2026	November 21, 2026
1	Kansas State	0	0–1	.000	November 4, 2023	N/A
1	Marshall	0	0–1	.000	September 21, 2024	N/A
1	Michigan State	1	1–0	1.000	October 30, 2021	October 30, 2021
1	North Texas	0	0–1	.000	September 5, 2026	N/A
1	Truman State	0	0–1	.000	November 21, 2026	N/A
1	UNLV	0	0–1	.000	December 6, 2024	N/A
1	West Virginia	1	0–1	.000	August 31, 2024	August 31, 2024

== Big Noon Saturday ==
Big Noon Saturday
- Genre: American college football game telecasts
- Presented by: Gus Johnson; Joel Klatt; Jenny Taft
- Opening theme: Fox College Football theme (main theme)
- Ending theme: Same as opening
- Country of origin: United States
- Original language: English
- No. of seasons: 8 (through 2026 season)

Production
- Production locations: Various NCAA stadiums
- Camera setup: Multi-camera
- Running time: 210 minutes or until game ends (inc. adverts)
- Production companies: National Collegiate Athletic Association; Fox Sports

Original release
- Network: Fox
- Release: August 31, 2019 – present

Related
- Fox College Football

Big Noon Saturday is an American weekly presentation of 12 p.m. ET broadcasts of NCAA Division I FBS college football games on Fox. The branding has been used since 2019. It is often, but not always, the game played at the site of Big Noon Kickoff.

Due to the early kickoff times, the package has faced criticism for having undue impacts on teams not based in the Eastern Time Zone (ET), including from University of Oklahoma Athletics Director Joe Castiglione (who felt that a Noon ET kickoff for a 2021 game against Nebraska, marking the 50th anniversary of their 1971 "Game of the Century", would diminish its profile), and Stanford head coach David Shaw (who, in particular, criticized Fox Sports for scheduling noon kickoffs involving visiting Pac-12 teams). In August 2021, University of Oklahoma president Joe Harroz cited criticism of Big Noon Saturday when discussing the Sooners' eventual 2024 move to the SEC, arguing that the Big 12 conference would be "last in line" in negotiating new media deals, and that "our fans talk about that. It also matters to student-athletes. When those who go before you, in terms of negotiations for 2025 and beyond, if those premiere slots are already taken up, it impacts things in a material way. It translates into disadvantages in recruiting the top talent, disadvantages for our student-athletes and a detriment to the fan experience." The SEC began a new rights deal with ESPN/ABC in the same season the Sooners, as well as Texas, moved to the SEC.

In the 2021 season, Big Noon Saturday overtook the SEC on CBS as having the highest average viewership for College Football telecasts. That season's Michigan/Ohio State game (which saw Michigan end an eight-game losing streak in the rivalry) was the highest-rated regular-season game of the 2021 season, and most-watched regular-season game since the Alabama–LSU game in 2019.

As of 2024, the primary broadcast team for games includes play-by-play announcer Gus Johnson and analyst Joel Klatt, with Jenny Taft as sideline reporter, with Tom Rinaldi joining the crew for big games, most notably The Game.
