= The Herd with Colin Cowherd =

US radio program

- Genre: Sports talk
- Running time: 3 hours
- Country of origin: United States
- Home station: ESPN Radio (2004–2015); Fox Sports Radio (2015–present)
- Syndicates: Premiere Networks
- TV adaptations: ESPNU (2008–2011, 2012–2015); ESPNews (2011–2012); Fox Sports 1 (2015–present)
- Starring: Colin Cowherd; Jason McIntyre
- Recording studio: Fox Network Center (Fox Studio Lot Building 101), 10201 W Pico Blvd, Century City, Los Angeles, California
- Original release: March 29, 2004 (ESPN), September 8, 2015 (Fox Sports Radio) – present
- Opening theme: "Battle Without Honor or Humanity" by Tomoyasu Hotei, from Kill Bill: Volume 1
- Website: The Herd with Colin Cowherd iHeartRadio channel

The Herd with Colin Cowherd (or simply The Herd) is an American sports talk show hosted by Colin Cowherd. A simulcast, it airs as both a sports talk radio show and television broadcast on Fox Sports Radio and Fox Sports 1, respectively. The show features commentary on the day's sports news, perspective on other news stories, and interviews with celebrities, sports analysts and sports figures.

== History ==
=== KFXX AM, ESPN Radio & ESPNU (2001–2015) ===
The Herd first aired on KFXX AM in 2001. The show joined ESPN Radio in 2004, rebranding as The Herd with Colin Cowherd, and four years later in 2008 would later be simulcast on ESPNU and ESPNews. During its run on ESPN, Cowherd was joined by on-air by producers Vincent Kates, David Fisch and Tom Wassell, and guest hosted by personalities such as Doug Gottlieb. ESPN Radio SportsCenter updates during the show were performed by Dan Davis. The show was heavily sponsored by Subway, with the guest caller line being dubbed the "Subway Fresh Take Hotline". On his March 5, 2010 show, Colin Cowherd announced that Amanda Gifford would be leaving The Herd to become a "suit". Additionally, the show was cut back one hour, airing three hours, from 10:00 a.m. to 1:00 p.m.

=== Fox Sports Radio & FS1 (2015–present) ===
Following controversial statements regarding the level of intelligence needed to understand the game of baseball and the education level of players from countries like the Dominican Republic, The Herd pulled from ESPN Radio and ESPNU on July 24, 2015, as Cowherd exited the network. After Cowherd joined Fox Sports, The Herd moved to the Premiere Networks-distributed Fox Sports Radio network, airing from 12:00 to 3:00 p.m. ET. Its television simulcast also moved to FS1. Fox Sports 1 airs a daily highlight show, The Best Thing I Herd, while a weekly highlight show, The Best Thing I Herd This Week, is posted on the program's YouTube channel. With the move to Fox Sports, production relocated from ESPN headquarters in Bristol, Connecticut to Fox Sports headquarters in Los Angeles. Also, Cowherd added a co-host role to the show, stating he hoped the position would be filled by someone who would use it to boost their career in the field, and that eventually the person would leave for a better opportunity.

Logo of the show when it was on ESPN

On April 25, 2018, co-host Kristine Leahy announced her departure from the show to host her own program on FS1. Her final episode was April 26, 2018. Following her departure, Joy Taylor became the full-time co-host and news correspondent for the program. Taylor remained in this role for four years until leaving in 2022 to become the co-host of Speak for Yourself, and was replaced by current co-host Jason McIntyre, the co-creator of The Big Lead.

On January 30, 2025, Cowherd formally announced his move to Chicago for The Herd, stating that a new studio will be built inside Big Ten Network's office in Rosemont, Illinois. He confirmed this move on his eponymous podcast. Most episodes have Cowherd based in Chicago, while McIntyre remains in L.A.

== Content ==
Cowherd calls his show a football show "first and foremost", with most of the discussions centered around the National Football League and College Football. The Herd also focuses on the National Basketball Association, but to a lesser degree. Other sports, such as Major League Baseball, college basketball, soccer, the Olympics, boxing, golf and Mixed Martial Arts are discussed usually during important times of the year (such as the World Series in Major League Baseball, March Madness in college basketball, etc.)

The show is a mix of Cowherd's own analysis alongside interviews with guests. Regular segments throughout the week include "Where Colin was Right/Where Colin was Wrong", "Hunch or Lunch", "The Blazin' 5" and "The Herd Hierarchy." He always ends his show with a final segment called "best for last." Cowherd used to take phone calls, but ended that practice a few years into his run while on Fox Sports.

== Controversies ==
- Eddie Guerrero's Death – In November 2005, Cowherd was criticized by former ESPN ombudsman George Solomon for his treatment of the death of World Wrestling Entertainment (WWE) wrestler Eddie Guerrero. Colin was quoted as saying "he passed away doing steroids", implying that Guerrero's death had been caused by steroid use. According to Dr. Kathryn Berg, the assistant chief medical examiner for Hennepin County in Minnesota, the autopsy showed that Guerrero died from a hardening and narrowing of the arteries that supply blood and oxygen to the heart.
- Using Un-attributed Material – In March 2006, Cowherd was criticized for using a joke on his show that was posted on the "M Zone", a University of Michigan fan blog, without crediting it. Cowherd later apologized on-air and gave the M Zone full credit for the material. The M Zone response: "He was very cool about everything. This incident is now resolved and over."
- The Herd Knocks Blog Offline – On April 5, 2007, listeners of The Herd knocked The Big Lead blog site offline. Cowherd directed his listeners to access the web site home page simultaneously (emulating a denial of service attack), which resulted in a massive increase in traffic. The blog site's servers were not capable of handling so many users at one time so the site was knocked off-line for approximately 96 hours. ESPN's new Ombudsman, Le Anne Schreiber, wrote an article sharing her (negative) opinion of Cowherd's actions. Schreiber contacted Traug Keller, a senior vice president at ESPN Radio, and Keller indicated that Cowherd would face no disciplinary action for the stunt, because there had been no policy against such a tactic at the time. To prevent this from happening again, Keller instituted a zero tolerance policy of such activities in the future.
- Sean Taylor's Murder – Cowherd was criticized for comments made regarding the circumstances surrounding Sean Taylor's death. On November 28, 2007, one day after Taylor's home invasion murder, Cowherd claimed that Taylor's past had brought this upon himself, and that Redskins fans who mourned him were not "grown-ups." Cowherd stated about Taylor's turnaround; "Well, yeah, just because you clean the rug doesn't mean you got everything out. Sometimes you've got stains, stuff so deep it never ever leaves." Taylor's death was later found to be the result of a botched robbery, and the robbers hadn't known Taylor was home when they entered.
- Cowherd drew negative feedback for inappropriate remarks about Dominican baseball players.
- LaVar Ball – Cowherd was criticized for how he handled LaVar Ball during an interview on May 17, 2017. While interviewing Ball, Kristine Leahy chimed in with her own thoughts and opinions. Ball never looked at her, telling her, without eye contact, to "stay in her lane." Cowherd continued the interview, not scolding him for his behavior, which the media later deemed sexist and misogynistic. The next episode, Cowherd and Leahy spoke of the incident during one of the first segments, with Cowherd stating he didn't say anything because Leahy is a strong woman who can defend herself and that if Ball did anything deemed inappropriate, he would have ended the interview immediately. Leahy agreed with Cowherd's assessment. Ball returned to the show June 12, 2018, with a now-departed Leahy replaced by Joy Taylor this time.

== Reception ==
Colin has been viewed as a somewhat polarizing figure, and his audience has varying opinions of his program, from "the best daily sports talk show" to "Awful. No one wants to hear that". The show has been praised for Colin's on-air honesty and unfiltered persona. Deadspin praised Cowherd's performance on the show as producing the highest percentage of correct predictions of all media pundits in 2021. However, he was also criticized for being self-contradictory, being unfunny during his attempts at humor, as well as not featuring many interviews from sports figures, his tendency to lean towards discussing more controversial topics on-air, and copying the style of Jim Rome.

Following the move to Fox Sports Radio and Fox Sports 1, Gabe Zaldivar of Forbes found many faults with the program, focusing on the indulgently large studio, Jason Whitlock's Whitlock Wednesdays weekly segment, which he described as being "as exciting as your uncles fighting over who ate the last doughnut", and Kristine Leahy's lack of opportunities to speak as co-host. He did however note that on September 28, 2015, The Herd outperformed both The Dan Patrick Show on NBC Sports Network and The Dan Le Batard Show with Stugotz on ESPNU in terms of viewership.

== Guest hosts ==
While on ESPN the regular fill-ins for Cowherd were Dave Rothenberg, Ryan Ruocco, Jorge Sedano, Linda Cohn, Adnan Virk, and Ryen Russillo. The fill-ins during his FOX tenure are Nick Wright and Doug Gottlieb. Former women's golfer turned broadcaster Holly Sonders fill in for Taylor.

== Awards ==
On December 19, 2005, Sports Illustrated named Cowherd "Radio Personality of the Year". Cowherd was lauded by columnist Richard Deitch for providing "an engaging mix of entertainment, information, and reportage.
