= Michelle Beadle =

Sports reporter

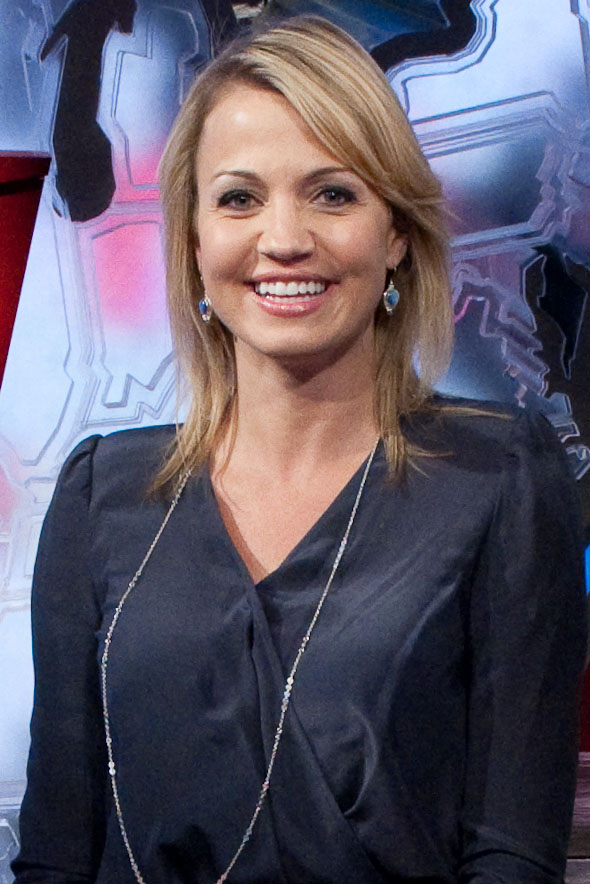
- Beadle in 2010
- Born: Michelle Denise Beadle; October 23, 1975 (age 50); Italy
- Education: University of Texas at San Antonio
- Occupations: Television host, sideline reporter
- Years active: 1997–present
- Notable credit(s): SportsNation; Winners Bracket

Michelle Denise Beadle (born October 23, 1975) is an American sports reporter and host who is part of the San Antonio Spurs broadcast team. Beadle was formerly the co-host of the ESPN morning sports show Get Up! along with Jalen Rose and Mike Greenberg, the co-host of SportsNation on ESPN2, and former host of Winners Bracket on ABC with Marcellus Wiley.

Beadle has had various hosting jobs on different networks prior to joining ESPN in 2009, including College Sports Television and the YES Network.

== Early life and education ==
Michelle Beadle was born in Italy to Bob Beadle, a former executive at Valero Energy, and Serenella Paladino, from Italy. She spent the first half of her childhood in Roanoke, Texas, outside Dallas, and the second half in Boerne, a small town outside San Antonio. She said that her mother was her best friend growing up because her mother did not speak English when she immigrated to America and they had to learn the language together. She was admittedly a tomboy growing up and had all male friends. She graduated from Boerne High School.

Beadle attended the University of Texas at Austin for political science as a pre-law student. She later joined a law group, and worked at the capitol in Austin, which helped dissuade her from pursuing a legal career. After three years she decided against law and took three years off because she did not know what she wanted to do and her college credits were geared toward law school. She spent time in Canada working odd jobs and eventually returned to Austin and waited tables while trying to decide what to do with her life.

Beadle also attended the University of Texas at San Antonio, graduating from the latter.

== Career ==
=== Early career ===
With her father's assistance, Beadle got her career start as an intern for the San Antonio Spurs and was later given a shot at being a reporter. She also started her career at Fox Sports Net hosting Big Game Hunters. In 2002, Beadle moved to TNN as a "behind-the-chutes" sideline reporter for the coverage of the Professional Bull Riders' (PBR) Bud Light Cup Series. She was originally meant to fill in for two weeks but was asked to stay full-time. While at TNN, she also served as a freelance reporter for CBS Sports on its coverage of the PBR and ESPN's Titan Games.

Next, Beadle went to the Travel Channel and hosted the show Get Packing. She then hosted a show for Major League Baseball Production's magazine show Cathedrals of the Game. Beadle later worked for the YES Network where she conducted interviews and did feature reporting for YES' regular season, preseason, and postseason New Jersey Nets telecasts. She also served as a sideline reporter for Nets basketball games, was co-host of Kids on Deck and Sportslife NYC, and was the host of YES' Ultimate Road Trip. Additionally, Beadle hosted College Sports Television's The 1 College Sports Show, and pre and postgame sports shows. She was also the reporter for the NFL Films syndicated program NFL Under the Helmet.

She also hosted several other entertainment-themed and reality-based shows, including People.com's feature, What You Missed Over the Weekend; Fine Living Network's I Want Your Job; Animal Planet's Animal Planet Report; Travel Channel's Beach Week series and Discovery Channel's Inside Orlando's Resorts, and Outrageous Room Service. She has also been a Red Carpet reporter for the Golden Globes, Grammy Awards, SAG Awards, and the Tony Awards, and contributed for People Magazine on television, appearing on The Today Show, The Early Show, Extra, Access Hollywood, and Entertainment Tonight.

=== Career at ESPN ===
Beadle joined ESPN on June 1, 2009, as co-host with Colin Cowherd of SportsNation, which premiered on ESPN2 on July 6, 2009. Beadle was one of the last people out of 142 to audition for SportsNation. ESPN called her back and asked her to write about what she would do to make the show better. Thinking it was a joke, she wrote "a sarcastic list of 10 stupid things," which helped her land the job. Prior to co-hosting SportsNation, during her time at TNN, Beadle also worked freelance as a reporter for ESPN's Titan Games. She also was the New York SportsCenter anchor for ESPN Radio's The Michael Kay Show on 1050 ESPN New York.

She was later named the co-host of Winners Bracket along with Marcellus Wiley. The show, which was part of ESPN Sports Saturday, a two-hour block of sports programming on ABC, premiered on April 3, 2010. She also hosted a weekly Podcast, "The Michelle Beadle Podcast", and has also served as a guest host on Mike and Mike in the Morning.

=== Career at NBC ===
On May 22, 2012, it was announced that she was leaving ESPN for the family of NBC networks, primarily as host on NBC Sports Network as well as correspondent on Access Hollywood. She anchored NBC Sports Network's daily morning studio coverage of the 2012 London Olympics.

The Crossover with Beadle and Briggs debuted on January 28, 2013, on the NBC Sports Network. The show featured Beadle and Dave Briggs, formerly of Fox News Channel and CSN New England. NBC described the show as one that focuses on sports, pop culture and entertainment. In May 2013, the show was rebranded as The Crossover with Michelle Beadle, with Beadle as the sole host. On September 25, 2013, The Crossover with Michelle Beadle was cancelled.

=== Return to ESPN ===
Beadle returned to ESPN on March 3, 2014, appearing as a co-host on SportsNation. She was released from her NBC contract early as part of a deal between the two media companies that included Ryder Cup coverage and Olympics highlights rights.

In July 2014, she criticized ESPN colleague Stephen A. Smith on social media for comments he made about the Ray Rice domestic abuse case. The furor led to a week-long suspension of Smith. She had another heated social media dialog on the same matter with MTV celebrity Christopher Boykin.

In September 2014, she joined Grantland, a subsidiary of ESPN, hosting a podcast called Beadlemania.

Beadle began hosting NBA Countdown in 2016. In April 2018, she also began co-hosting a morning sports show on ESPN called Get Up! along with Jalen Rose and Mike Greenberg. In August of the same year, ESPN announced that Beadle would be leaving Get Up! by the end of the month, and instead focus her efforts on NBA coverage. In the summer of 2019, ESPN quietly removed Beadle from NBA Countdown, replacing her with Rachel Nichols and Maria Taylor, respectively. Beadle then proceeded to enter a buyout with ESPN, which ended her time at the company.

=== HBO – The Fight Game ===
As of March 2015, Beadle had interviewed Manny Pacquiao on HBO's The Fight Game regarding the 2015 fight with Floyd Mayweather.

== Personal life ==
Beadle is an avid dog lover, as well as being a fan of professional wrestling, the Houston Astros, and the San Antonio Spurs. She has two siblings: a younger brother, Robert, and a younger sister.
