= The Big Lead =

American sports blog

- Website type: Blog
- Available in: English
- Owners: Chris Pirrone; Gary Lee
- Creators: Jason McIntyre; David Lessa
- Website: www.thebiglead.com
- Commercial: Yes
- Registration: Optional
- Launched: February 24, 2006; 20 years ago
- Current status: Active

The Big Lead is an American sports and pop culture blog. The website covers sports news and sports media, but also touches on a varying degree of other news topics such as politics, media personalities and pop culture. Originally launched on February 24, 2006, it was co-founded by sportswriter Jason McIntyre and his college friend David Lessa. In June 2010, McIntyre sold the site to Fantasy Sports Ventures for "low seven figures." Gannett purchased Fantasy Sports Ventures on January 24, 2012, integrating the site into the USA Today Sports Media Group.

In 2009 the site averaged over 8 million monthly page views. In 2012, McIntyre expanded his media presence by also hosting a weekly sports radio program on Fox Sports Radio named after the website, The Big Lead With Jason McIntyre. The site had a passionate audience who often communicated on sports and culture related topics, sometimes via hundreds of comments on a single story.

In March 2019, Gannett sold The Big Lead to Minute Media, owner of The Players Tribune and international soccer site 90min.com. At that time, McIntyre exited.

In July 2024, the site was acquired from Minute Media by former USA Today Media Group General Manager and digital innovator Chris Pirrone, who planned to reinvigorate the site and bring it back to its roots with interesting sports and pop culture commentary.

== Format and content ==
The site is usually updated ten to fifteen times a day between 8:00 a.m. and 6:00 p.m. Eastern Time, with each post receiving its own title and space for registered readers to post comments. The publishing day usually begins with the morning "Roundup", which provides links to varying news stories of interest in paragraph form at the top, and mainly links to different sports-related stories at the bottom of the column page. The "Roundup" feature is usually accompanied by a photograph of an attractive model or actress, as well as relevant or humorous YouTube clips. For many years, the site staged what it called a "Culture Tournament", in which 64 different sports figures, celebrities or other items of relevance (such as "Michael Phelps' Bong Hit," in which the Olympic Gold medal swimmer was caught smoking marijuana in 2009) are seeded in a bracket styled after that used to outline teams competing in the NCAA men's basketball tournament. Readers are allowed to vote one time for each match up until a winner is decided. In 2008, ESPN sideline reporter Erin Andrews beat out actress/singer Jessica Simpson. For the 2009 edition, Megan Fox was crowned champion narrowly over Andrews.

== Gaining notoriety ==
The Big Lead first gained notoriety after it obtained interviews with syndicated sportswriter and ESPN Poker commentator Norman Chad, and Kansas City Star and Fox Sports columnist Jason Whitlock. The interview with Whitlock generated controversy when he proceeded to trash his then-ESPN colleagues Scoop Jackson and Mike Lupica, the fallout of which ended Whitlock's association with the network.

== The Colin Cowherd incident ==
On April 5, 2007, Colin Cowherd, then host of a self-titled radio program on ESPN Radio, instructed his show's listeners to flood The Big Lead with traffic. The surge in activity overloaded the website's servers, knocking The Big Lead offline for about 48 hours, before the site was restored on April 7. The attack appeared to be unprovoked, with Cowherd saying "wouldn't it be great if we could blow up a website?". His actions drew criticism from the blogosphere, as well as ESPN.com's ombudsman Le Anne Schreiber, who called his actions "immature, irresponsible, arrogant, malicious, destructive and dumb." Since such actions were not forbidden by ESPN at that time, Cowherd did not face any disciplinary action for the incident. Coincidentally, nine years later in 2016, McIntyre joined Cowherd and Jason Whitlock as a co-commentator on their Fox Sports 1 talk show, Speak for Yourself with Cowherd & Whitlock. Then in 2022, McIntyre joined Cowherd on another talk show on its TV network, The Herd with Colin Cowherd.
