= FoxSports.com =

Sports news website

- Website type: Sports
- Owners: Fox Sports (Fox Corporation)
- Website: www.foxsports.com
- Launched: July 2001; 25 years ago
- Current status: Public

FoxSports.com is a sports news website operated by Fox Sports Media Group. The website primarily features streaming video content surrounding sports-related topics, including segments and features from the division's studio programming, and streaming of Fox Sports cable networks for subscribers on participating television providers.

== History ==
In May 2004, Fox Sports entered into an agreement with Microsoft for FoxSports.com to become the official sports portal of MSN.com, replacing ESPN.com; the deal included joint advertising sales and revenue sharing, and integration of FoxSports.com into MSN.com and its associated services. The partnership was dissolved in 2014.

In 2016, Fox Sports executive Jamie Horowitz took over the operations of the division's digital properties. Horowitz (who had led the Fox Sports 1 cable channel's shift to opinion-based studio programming rather than general sports news coverage) began to institute new editorial practices at FoxSports.com, proposing that the website's written content be used to promote FS1 pundits such as Colin Cowherd and Skip Bayless, rather than original reports. During the lead-up to Super Bowl LI, the website piloted an aspect of this content strategy by having articles ghostwritten under the names of FS1 pundits.

On June 26, 2017, Fox Sports redesigned its website to focus primarily on streaming video content, laying off 20 writers so these positions could be filled by video-focused roles. The video content draws largely from FS1 studio programs. Written articles were largely limited to wire from the Associated Press. On July 3, 2017, Horowitz was fired from Fox Sports over allegations of sexual harassment.

In 2019, TV Everywhere streaming of Fox Sports national telecasts and channels was moved to FoxSports.com and the Fox Sports app, as the existing Fox Sports Go platform was bundled with Fox Sports Networks as part of the acquisition of 21st Century Fox by Disney, and divested to Sinclair Broadcast Group.

By 2020, Fox Sports had begun to backpedal on its video-only strategy, with columnists such as The Big Lead co-founder Jason McIntyre (who was laid off after the site's sale to Minute Media, and subsequently joined Fox Sports), as well as NASCAR writer Bob Pockrass beginning to publish articles on the site. On July 20, 2020, the Fox Sports website and app received a major redesign, officially placing a re-emphasis on written articles alongside multimedia content tied to Fox Sports television networks, as well as sports betting content.

On February 6, 2026, Fox Sports released a ranking of all 20 teams in the 2026 World Baseball Classic, which sparked controversy in Taiwan after Chinese Taipei was placed at 17th place despite the article stating that Chinese Taipei won gold at the 2024 Premier12 tournament.

== See also ==
- Fox Sports Go
- Fox One
