= Andscape =

Sports and pop culture website owned and operated by ESPN

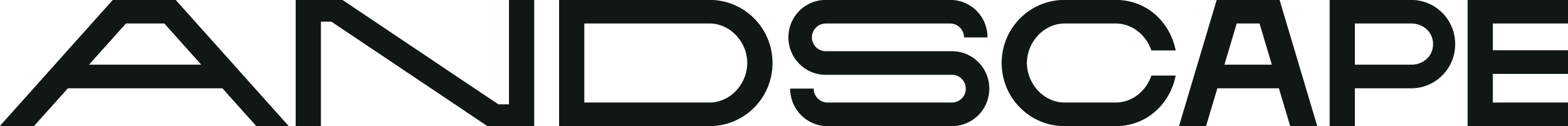
- Website type: Media and entertainment
- Available in: English
- Owner: ESPN, LLC
- Editor: Raina Kelley
- Website: andscape.com
- Commercial: Yes
- Launched: May 17, 2016; 10 years ago

Andscape, formerly The Undefeated, is a sports and pop culture website owned and operated by ESPN. Launched May 17, 2016, the site describes itself as "the premier platform for exploring the intersections of race, sports and culture."

== History ==
In 2014, ESPN announced the creation of a new website "that will provide in-depth coverage, commentary and insight on sports, race and culture directed towards the African-American audience". Editor-in-chief Jason Whitlock described the then-unnamed site as a "Black Grantland", a reference to the now-defunct ESPN sports website overseen by popular sports columnist Bill Simmons. Whitlock said the name "The Undefeated" was inspired by a passage from American poet Maya Angelou: "You may encounter many defeats, but you must not be defeated."

While the site was still in development, a Deadspin report alleged that Whitlock was "poisoning" The Undefeated with an unconventional management style that made it difficult for the site to attract and retain prime talent, with several anonymous sources documenting an extremely negative work environment. On June 12, 2015, Whitlock had been removed from his post, and he attributed his dismissal to "numerous reasons, including my foolish belief that I could manage like a football coach. I learned there's an art to corporate politics that I'm not good at."

On October 19, 2015, Kevin Merida, author, journalist and Washington Post managing editor, took over the editor-in-chief position at The Undefeated. He left to become executive editor of the Los Angeles Times in 2021. Raina Kelley, who was the managing editor since 2015, became editor-in-chief.

On February 27, 2022, The Undefeated officially changed its name to Andscape. The name change was because Andscape intended to expand into book publishing, live experiences, music, television and film, but ESPN and Disney did not own The Undefeated trademark outside of news and commentary.

== Notable achievements ==
On June 25, 2016, Michael Jordan issued an exclusive statement to The Undefeated announcing his $2 million donation to organizations working to improve police-community relations. In August 2015, The Undefeated hosted a town hall meeting entitled "An Undefeated Conversation: Athletes, Responsibility, and Violence." The event occurred at the South Side YMCA in Chicago. Among the panelists was Chicago native and Chicago Bulls guard Dwyane Wade, who appeared via satellite. Other panelists included Chicago Bulls point guard Rajon Rondo, former Detroit Pistons point guard Isiah Thomas, WNBA/Chicago Sky guard Cappie Pondexter, and ESPN analysts Doug Glanville and Marcellus Wiley.

On October 11, 2016, the site hosted "The Undefeated Conversation with President Obama: Sports, Race and Achievement", a forum at North Carolina A&T State University in Greensboro.
