= Marcellus Wiley =

American football player (born 1974)

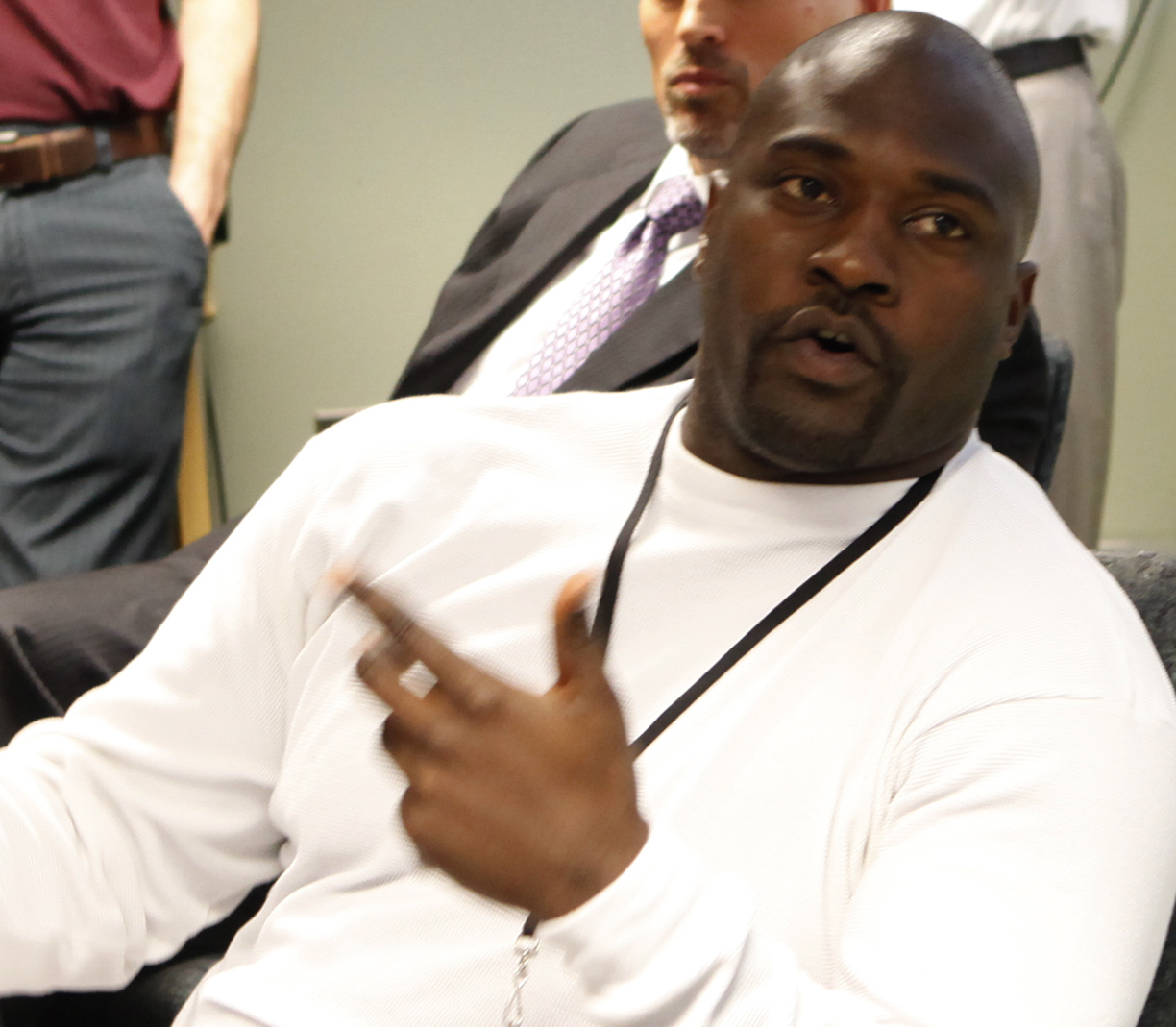
- Wiley in 2010

No. 75
- Position: Defensive end

Personal information
- Born: November 30, 1974 (age 51); Compton, California, U.S.
- Listed height: 6 ft 4 in (1.93 m)
- Listed weight: 275 lb (125 kg)

Career information
- High school: Saint Monica Catholic (Santa Monica, California)
- College: Columbia (1992–1996)
- NFL draft: 1997: 2nd round, 52nd overall pick

Career history
- Buffalo Bills (1997–2000); San Diego Chargers (2001–2003); Dallas Cowboys (2004); Jacksonville Jaguars (2005–2006)

Awards and highlights
- Second-team All-Pro (2001); Pro Bowl (2001); 2× First-team All-Ivy League (1994, 1996)

Career NFL statistics
- Tackles: 322
- Sacks: 44.0
- Interceptions: 2
- Forced fumbles: 14
- Stats at Pro Football Reference

Marcellus Vernon Wiley Sr. (born November 30, 1974) is an American sportscaster and former professional football player. He played as a defensive end for 10 seasons in the National Football League (NFL) with the Buffalo Bills, San Diego Chargers, Dallas Cowboys, and Jacksonville Jaguars. He was selected to the Pro Bowl in 2001 with the Chargers.

Wiley formerly hosted the More To It podcast, as part of the Dan Patrick Podcast Network. He also formerly co-hosted SportsNation on ESPN, as well as an afternoon drive-time sports talk radio show on ESPN 710AM in Los Angeles, and Fox Sports 1's Speak For Yourself. Wiley also published a book Never Shut Up: The Life, Opinions, and Unexpected Adventures of an NFL Outlier in 2018.

== Biography ==
=== Early life ===
Wiley initially attended Westchester High School in Los Angeles before transferring to Saint Monica Catholic High School in Santa Monica, California, where he starred in both football and track and field. In football, he was an All-Conference pick. Wiley was a teammate of Adrian Klemm. He was his school's valedictorian and a member of the National Honor Society. In 1988, he was a national typewriting champion, with 82 words per minute.

=== College career ===
At Columbia University, Wiley played tailback, defensive end, and kick returner for the Lions. Starting as running back his freshman and sophomore years, he converted to defensive end in his senior season, recording 63 tackles (17 for loss), 6.5 sacks, eight pass breakups and three blocked field goals. As a team captain, he helped lead the Lions to an 8–2 season, the team's most wins since 1945. Wiley was a first-team All-American and All-Ivy League pick, and graduated from Columbia in 1997 with a degree in sociology.

=== Professional career ===
Pre-draft measurables
Height	Weight	Arm length	Hand span	40-yard dash	10-yard split	20-yard split	20-yard shuttle	Three-cone drill	Vertical jump	Broad jump	Bench press
6 ft 4 3/4 in (1.95 m)	271 lb (123 kg)	34 1/2 in (0.88 m)	9 5/8 in (0.24 m)	4.91 s	1.68 s	2.83 s	4.50 s	7.48 s	35 1/2 in (0.90 m)	10 ft 2 in (3.10 m)	28 reps
All values from NFL Combine

He was selected with the 52nd overall pick in the second round of the 1997 NFL draft out of Columbia University by the Buffalo Bills.

Wiley started his professional career primarily as a situational pass rusher, recording nine sacks through his first three years. In 2000, Wiley underwent disc-repair surgery, missing the preseason. However, when Hall-of-Famer Bruce Smith left for the Washington Redskins, Wiley replaced him at defensive end for the Bills, making the opening day roster.

He was selected to the AFC Pro Bowl team in 2001 as a Charger.

==== NFL statistics ====
Year	Team	Games	Combined tackles	Tackles	Assisted tackles	Sacks	Forced fumbles	Fumble recoveries
1997	BUF	16	15	11	4	0.0	1	1
1998	BUF	16	24	17	7	3.5	0	1
1999	BUF	16	25	19	6	5.0	0	0
2000	BUF	16	65	40	25	10.5	3	1
2001	SD	14	48	38	10	13.0	5	0
2002	SD	14	35	30	5	6.0	1	0
2003	SD	16	51	38	13	3.0	2	1
2004	DAL	16	38	31	7	3.0	1	0
2005	JAX	11	6	6	0	0.0	0	0
2006	JAX	12	13	8	5	0.0	0	0
Career		147	320	238	82	44.0	13	4

=== Post NFL career ===
Wiley was a cofounder of Prolebrity (a portmanteau of professional and celebrity), a sports community where pro athletes express viewpoints, publicize their businesses, charities and events, and connect with other athletes, fans and business opportunities.

Wiley worked for ESPN's NFL Live and was a substitute co-host for Mike and Mike in the Morning. He also co-hosted SportsNation. Wiley co-hosted Winners Bracket with Michelle Beadle from 2010 to 2012. Later, he co-hosted several renditions of LA's afternoon radio show including "Max and Marcellus," "Afternoons with Marcellus and Kelvin," and "Afternoons on ESPNLA with Marcellus Wiley and Travis Rogers" on ESPN LA from 2013 to 2018.

In January 2013, he became co-host of SportsNation on a full-time basis, taking over for Colin Cowherd.

On July 13, 2018, Wiley left his position at ESPN and joined FS1 as co-host of Speak for Yourself alongside Jason Whitlock. When Whitlock's contract was not renewed by Fox Sports in June 2020, Emmanuel Acho replaced Whitlock and joined Wiley as the new co-host. In July 2022, Wiley left Speak For Yourself as its host, for another role at FS1.

In 2018, Wiley's book Never Shut Up: The Life, Opinions, and Unexpected Adventures of an NFL Outsider was released.

In 2022, Wiley began hosting the More To It podcast, as part of the Dan Patrick Podcast Network. His first guests were Lil Wayne, Bruce Smith, and LaDainian Tomlinson. Wiley ended the "More To It" podcast in October of 2023. He subsequently began two Youtube podcasts, "Hydration Situation" and "On the Rocks." The former consists of Wiley providing opinions on sports and sports media controversies. The latter is a weekly roundtable discussion of sports, cultural and political topics with former athletes and non-athletes Wiley considers friends.

=== Millionaire Matchmaker ===
Wiley appeared on a November 2011 episode of Bravo's Millionaire Matchmaker. Season 5, Episode 12: "The Player and the Piano Player" ended when Wiley successfully found a romantic interest.

== Personal life ==
Wiley is married to Annemarie Wiley (b. 1982 or 1983), a nurse anesthetist, who joined as a full-time cast member for the thirteenth season of The Real Housewives of Beverly Hills. Marcellus and Annemarie are parents to four children: Marcellus's daughter from a previous relationship, as well as their son and two daughters.

== Legal issues ==
In April 2026, four women filed a legal claim accusing Wiley of sexually assaulting them. Wiley publicly denied the allegations.

On July 4, 2026, Wiley was arrested in Orange County, Florida on domestic violence charges after police received reports that he abused his wife. He was held without bond in Orange County Jail.

On September 10, 2026, Annemarie Wiley was granted a three-year restraining order against Marcellus Wiley.
