= Colin Cowherd =

American sports media personality

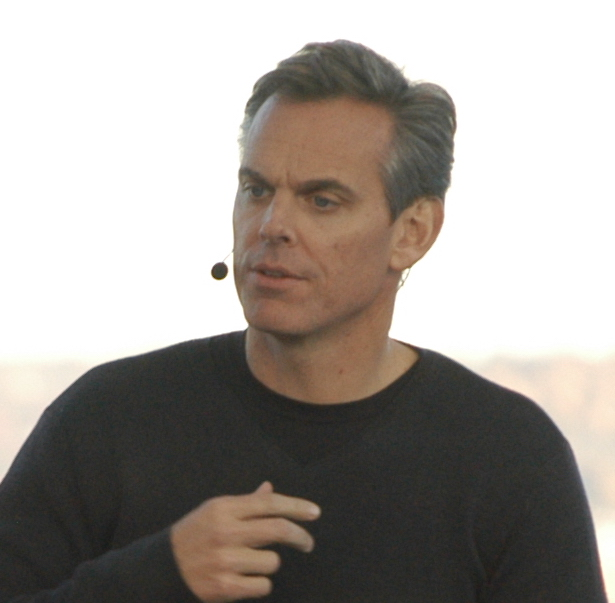
- Cowherd in 2011
- Born: Colin Murray Cowherd; January 6, 1964 (age 62); Aberdeen, Washington, U.S.
- Education: Eastern Washington University (BA)
- Spouses: Kimberly Vadala (m. 1996; div. 2007) Ann Hamilton-Cowherd (m. 2010)
- Children: 2
- Presenting career
- Show: The Herd with Colin Cowherd
- Stations: Fox Sports Radio; Fox Sports 1
- Network: Fox

Colin Murray Cowherd (born January 6, 1964) is an American sports media personality. He began his broadcasting career as sports director of Las Vegas television station KVBC and as a sports anchor on several other stations before joining ESPN in 2003, where he hosted a radio show on the ESPN Radio network and also became one of the original hosts of ESPN's television program SportsNation, as well as Colin's New Football Show. Cowherd is currently the host of The Herd with Colin Cowherd on Fox Sports Radio and Fox Sports 1.

== Early life and education ==
Cowherd was born on January 6, 1964, in Aberdeen, Washington. His father, Charles, was an optometrist and his British-born mother Patricia (d. 2014) was a housewife who emigrated to the United States at age 14. He has an older sister named Marlene. Cowherd grew up in Grayland, Washington, a small fishing town about 130 miles (210 km) southwest of Seattle. His parents divorced while he was young due to his father's alcoholism, and he and his sister were raised mainly by their mother. Cowherd described himself as a loner during his childhood, spending much time sitting on his roof, listening to baseball games on the radio.

Cowherd graduated from Ocosta High School in Westport in 1982. In high school, Cowherd played quarterback for the football team and was an All-Far West Conference guard for the basketball team. He then attended Eastern Washington University, where he was a roommate of football player and coach Jim McElwain. He graduated in 1985 with a Bachelor of Arts degree.

== Career ==
=== Early career ===
Cowherd began his career as the play-by-play voice for the San Diego Padres Triple-A affiliate Las Vegas Stars. He eventually became a sports director at KVBC in Las Vegas, where he was named Nevada's Sportscaster of the Year five times. He served as weekend sports anchor at WTVT in Tampa, Florida from 1993 to 1995. In 1996, he moved to Portland, Oregon where he worked as a sports anchorman for KGW-TV. In 2001, The Herd moved from an afternoon time slot on all-sports radio KFXX to the morning drive time.

=== ESPN ===
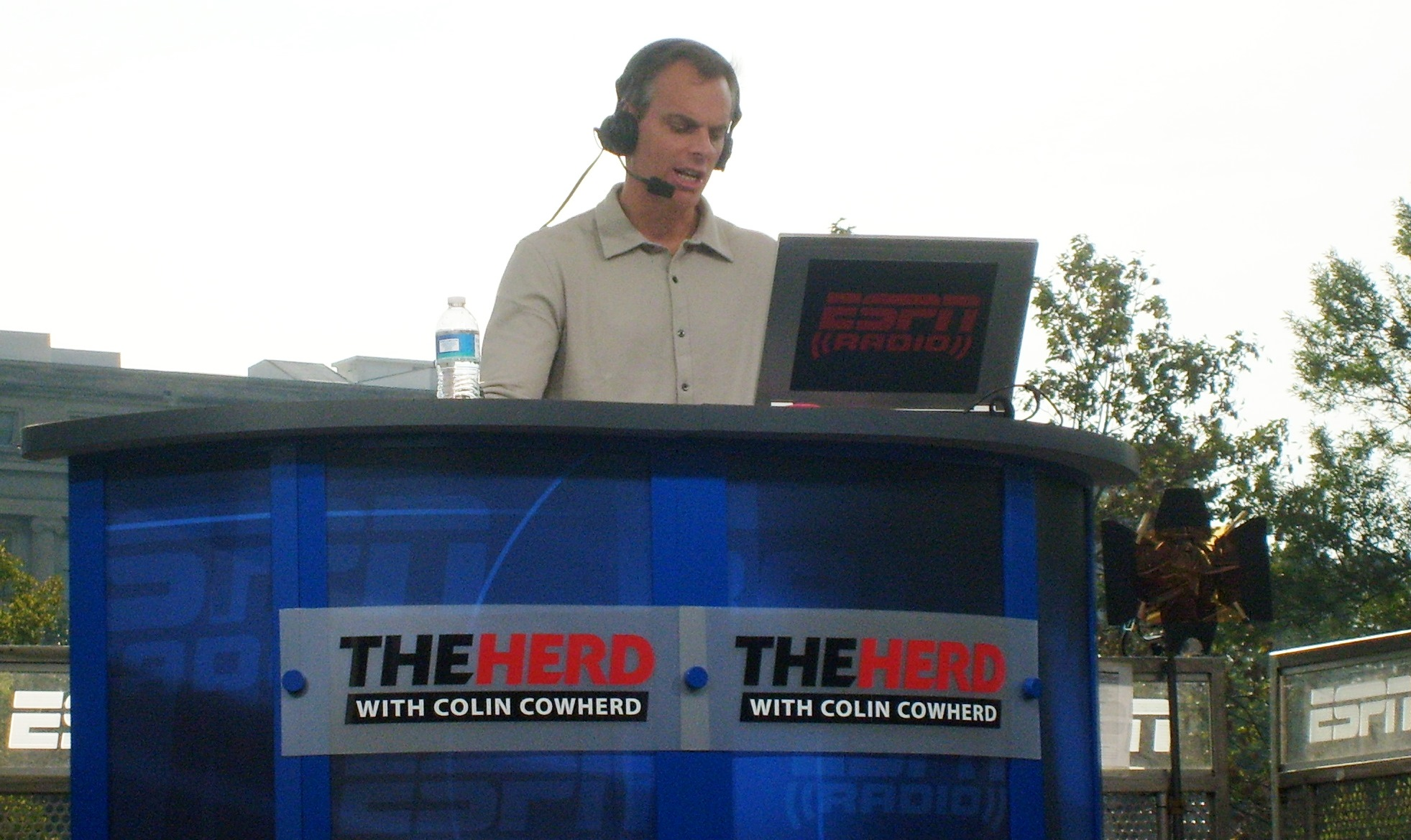
Colin Cowherd during a live broadcast of his radio program on the campus of The University of Iowa in 2010

In 2003, Cowherd was selected to replace Tony Kornheiser for the late-morning time slot (10 AM – 1 PM ET) on ESPN Radio. From 2004 to 2015, it was transmitted to ESPN Radio affiliates throughout the United States and online at ESPNRadio.com. In 2008, the Herd added a simulcast on ESPNU. The show featured commentary on sports news, perspective on other news stories, and interviews with popular analysts and sports figures. The majority of his conversations primarily centered around the National Football League (NFL), college football, and the National Basketball Association (NBA).

In November 2005, ESPN apologized following a number of complaints about comments made by Cowherd on the death of professional wrestler Eddie Guerrero on the November 13, 2005 edition of The Herd. Cowherd had reportedly commented "who cares that he died" and described his death as "not newsworthy" before speculating on the cause of death. He was later reprimanded by ESPN Radio general manager Bruce Gilbert over his remarks. Cowherd again drew criticism in April 2014 with remarks on the death of The Ultimate Warrior. In March 2018, Cowherd - who had previously referred to professional wrestling fans as "lonely, pathetic Booger Eaters" - attended the taping of an episode of WWE SmackDown.

On the April 5, 2007, edition of The Herd, Cowherd directed his listeners to "blow up" the sports blog The Big Lead by simultaneously visiting its home page. The site was unable to handle the influx in traffic, and the site was knocked offline for approximately 96 hours. ESPN's new Ombudsman, LeAnne Schreiber, wrote an article sharing her negative opinion of Cowherd's actions. Schreiber contacted Traug Keller, a senior vice president at ESPN Radio, and Keller indicated that Cowherd would face no disciplinary action for the stunt, because there had been no policy against such a tactic at the time. To prevent this from happening again, Keller instituted a zero tolerance policy of such activities in the future.

Cowherd was criticized for comments he made regarding the circumstances surrounding the death of Sean Taylor. On November 28, 2007, one day after Taylor's home invasion murder, Cowherd claimed that Taylor's past had brought this on him and that Redskins fans who mourned him were not "grown-ups". He stated about Taylor's turnaround: "Well yeah, just because you clean the rug doesn't mean you got everything out. Sometimes you've got stains, stuff so deep it never ever leaves." Taylor's death was later found to be the result of a botched robbery and the robbers hadn't known Taylor was home when they entered.

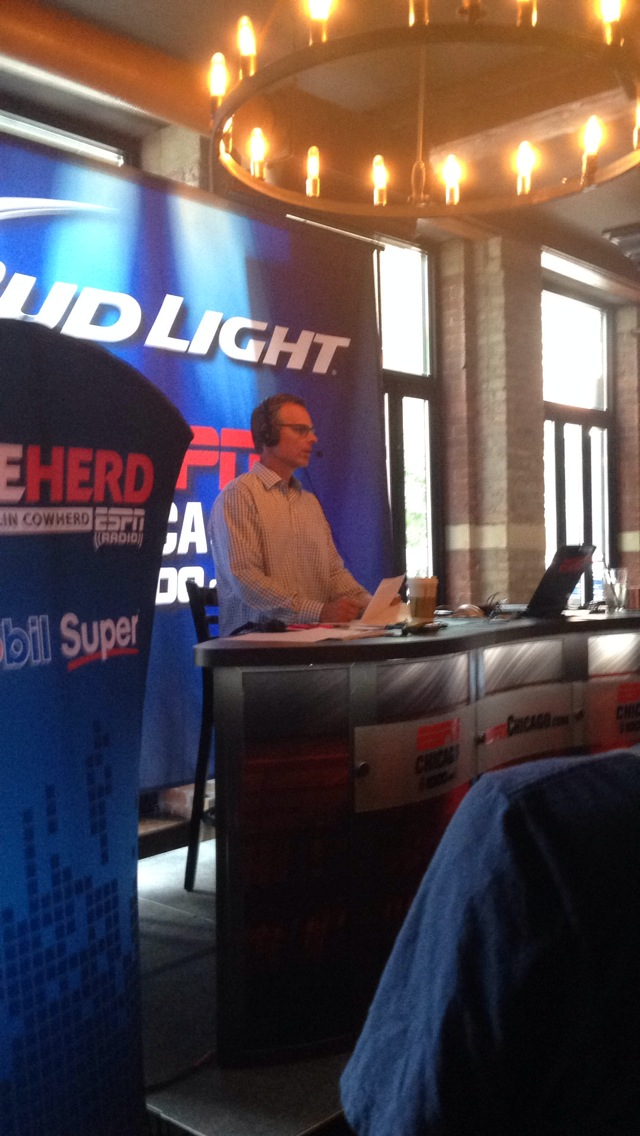
Colin Cowherd during a live broadcast of The Herd at Public House in Chicago, Illinois on July 30, 2014

In fall 2013, Cowherd began hosting the ESPN Sunday morning pro and college football talk show Colin's New Football Show. Also in 2013, Cowherd's first book, You Herd Me! I'll Say It If Nobody Else Will, was published. Cowherd has said on his radio show that he had been writing the book on-and-off for a few years. In 2015, Cowherd released his second book, Raw: My 100%, Grade-A, Unfiltered, Inside Look at Sports.

On July 23, 2015, Cowherd made remarks connecting the number of baseball players from the Dominican Republic to the game's alleged simplicity. The observation that the Dominican Republic "has not been known in my lifetime as having world class academic abilities", because "a lot of those kids come from rough backgrounds and have not had opportunities academically that other kids from other countries have."

The remarks drew the ire of some Dominican players, such as José Bautista, and of the MLB Players Association; later that day, USA Today reported that the MLBPA was considering the possibility of "withholding cooperation" with ESPN and Fox over their lack of reaction to the remarks. Major League Baseball also condemned Cowherd for making remarks they felt were "inappropriate, offensive and completely inconsistent with the values of our game."

Cowherd and ESPN had already announced that he was leaving ESPN eight days before this occurred. The day after he made the controversial remarks, ESPN announced that it would immediately cut ties with Cowherd in response to the remarks. During the final episode of The Herd, Cowherd presented statistics from several studies regarding the current state of education in the Dominican Republic. He went on to say that "I could've said a third of baseball's talent is being furnished from countries with economic hardships, therefore educational hurdles. For the record, I used the Dominican Republic because they've furnished baseball with so many great players." Cowherd apologized, though the apology was not well received.

=== SportsNation ===
He, Michelle Beadle, and later Charissa Thompson co-hosted the TV show SportsNation on ESPN2 from 2009 to 2012; the show debuted on July 6, 2009. SportsNation was designed to take "the pulse" of the nation. Cowherd and Thompson were given two choices to select from and they attempted to determine which choice was the audience's favorite (e.g., Who is more likely to haunt someone when they die, Kobe Bryant or Joe Paterno?). Cowherd announced in September 2012 that he would be leaving the program; his last month as host was December 2012. Marcellus Wiley took over for Cowherd in January 2013.

=== Fox Sports ===
On July 16, 2015, it was announced that Cowherd would leave ESPN. Network president John Skipper stated that Cowherd's presence had been "mutually beneficial", going on to say that "he came to national prominence on ESPN with his unique perspective on sports and society. Endings also bring new beginnings, for ESPN and Colin, and we thank him and wish him the best." Multiple sources reported that Cowherd was in talks with Fox Sports; Jamie Horowitz, a Fox Sports executive, previously worked for ESPN as a producer for Cowherd. Cowherd's final broadcast aired on July 24, 2015. Although his contract was originally scheduled to end a week later on July 31, Cowherd was released earlier following controversial remarks he made regarding Dominican baseball players during the previous day's edition of The Herd.

On August 12, 2015, it was officially announced that Cowherd would join Fox Sports with a four-year deal. The Herd moved to Premiere Networks and Fox Sports Radio on September 8, 2015, and its TV simulcast moved to Fox Sports 1. Kristine Leahy was the co-host and newswoman. Joy Taylor replaced Leahy in 2018. Cowherd also serves as a contributor to Fox NFL Kickoff. Cowherd was also the co-host on daily sports talk show Speak for Yourself with Cowherd & Whitlock on Fox Sports 1 with Jason Whitlock.

On January 30, 2025, Cowherd formally announced his move to Chicago, a big change for him and "The Herd with Colin Cowherd." He will split his time between Los Angeles and Chicago. He confirmed the new digs on Wednesday on "The Colin Cowherd Podcast." A new studio will be built inside Big Ten Network's office in Rosemont, Illinois.

=== The Volume ===
In 2018, Cowherd partnered with iHeartRadio and Red Seat Ventures to launch The Herd Podcast Network. On February 1, 2021, The Volume sports-talk podcast was launched, featuring its flagship program, The Colin Cowherd Podcast. Other podcasts on the platform are led by pro athletes Draymond Green and Richard Sherman.

== Personal life ==
In February 2021, Cowherd was hospitalized with a blood clot in his right lung.

Cowherd resides in Chicago with his wife Ann. He has two children, one daughter and one son.

== Awards ==
- Sports Illustrated's 2005 Radio Personality of the year.
- Nevada's Sportscaster of the Year five times, as voted by the National Sportscasters and Sportswriters Association.
- Rated by PunditTracker as the Best Pundit of 2012 for his sports predictions.
- Radio Hall of Fame Class of 2025
