= Animal Planet Report =

- Genre: Reality; Documentary
- Presented by: Michelle Beadle
- Country of origin: United States
- Original language: English

Production
- Production company: Lucky Duck Productions

Original release
- Network: Animal Planet
- Release: November 11, 2005 – 2006

Animal Planet Report is a reality television series about reports on animals all over the United States. The series aired on Animal Planet and was hosted by Michelle Beadle.
