= Joy Taylor =

American media personality (born 1987)

- Born: Joy Allison Taylor; January 17, 1987 (age 39); Pittsburgh, Pennsylvania, U.S.
- Education: Barry University
- Occupations: Television, radio and podcast host, news update anchor of The Herd, co-host Speak

Joy Allison Taylor (born January 17, 1987) is a former American television host and sports commentator. She most recently worked for Fox Sports 1 (FS1) and co-hosted Speak with Keyshawn Johnson and Paul Pierce.

Taylor was previously moderator of FS1's studio show Skip and Shannon: Undisputed with commentators Skip Bayless and Shannon Sharpe, news update anchor on FS1's The Herd with Colin Cowherd, and host of The Joy Taylor Show Saturdays on Fox Sports Radio.

== Early years ==
Taylor attended Barry University, where she graduated with a Bachelor of Arts in broadcast communications in 2009. Taylor was the host of radio show The Noise and serving as the manager for her alma mater's radio station WBRY 1640 AM while finishing her degree.

== Career ==
Taylor previously worked three years at 790 AM The Ticket in Miami, where she began as the executive producer, then eventually became the co-host for the station's top-rated morning-drive sports radio show, Zaslow and Joy Show. Taylor also served as the host of Fantasy Football Today and Thursday Night Live on CBSSports.com. Taylor joined FOX Sports in March 2016, playing pinch-hitter in several different FS1 roles, including filling in for Kristine Leahy on The Herd with Colin Cowherd. On August 15, 2016, it was announced by Fox Sports that Taylor would be the moderator for FS1's upcoming sports debate show Skip and Shannon: Undisputed with commentators Skip Bayless and former NFL tight end and former CBS sports analyst Shannon Sharpe. She also hosts The Hang on Facebook Live and her podcast Maybe I'm Crazy. In 2018, Fox announced that starting June 18, Taylor would be moving from Undisputed to The Herd with Colin Cowherd, also airing on FS1 along with Fox Sports Radio.

On September 9, 2021, it was announced that Taylor would be the host of her own Saturday program, The Joy Taylor Show on Fox Sports Radio. Taylor began co-hosting Speak on FS1 on September 6, 2022.

Taylor was released by Fox Sports in July 2025.

== Personal life ==
She was married to former professional baseball player Richard Giannotti from 2016 to 2017. Taylor said during an episode of Undisputed in 2017 that she is a survivor of domestic abuse. In September 2018, news broke that Taylor was engaged to former NBA point guard and coach Earl Watson.

Taylor received media attention in May 2025 when she expressed the opinion that prostitution should be legalized in order to help alleviate male loneliness, which she considers to be a “massive fucking problem.”

== Legal issues ==
On January 5, 2025, Taylor was named in a lawsuit filed by former Fox Sports hairstylist Noushin Faraji against Fox Sports, alleging sexual and workplace harassment. Faraji alleges that she told Taylor about Fox Sports executive Charlie Dixon having "rubbed her body and grabbed her buttocks while attending a party for Taylor in West Hollywood in January 2017", with Taylor then telling Faraji to "get over it". After Taylor and Faraji's friendship ended, the latter alleges that Taylor began insulting her "on a personal and professional level". The lawsuit alleges that Joy Taylor was having an affair with Dixon. Faraji alleged that Taylor had planned on accusing Dixon of sexual assault at a later date. Emmanuel Acho, who is not named as a defendant, appeared in Faraji's lawsuit after she claimed that Taylor was having sex with him in 2020 so that he would recommend her for a job on Speak for Yourself, a job she did end up getting. Per the suit, the two continued their sexual relationship through 2023. According to Faraji, she was asked by Human Resources if Acho and Taylor were having an affair, and she said they were. After that, she allegedly faced professional and personal repercussions from Taylor. The suit states: "Mr. Acho had always been respectful to Ms. Faraji and never threatened or hurt her."
