= Emmanuel Acho =

Nigerian-American football player (born 1990)

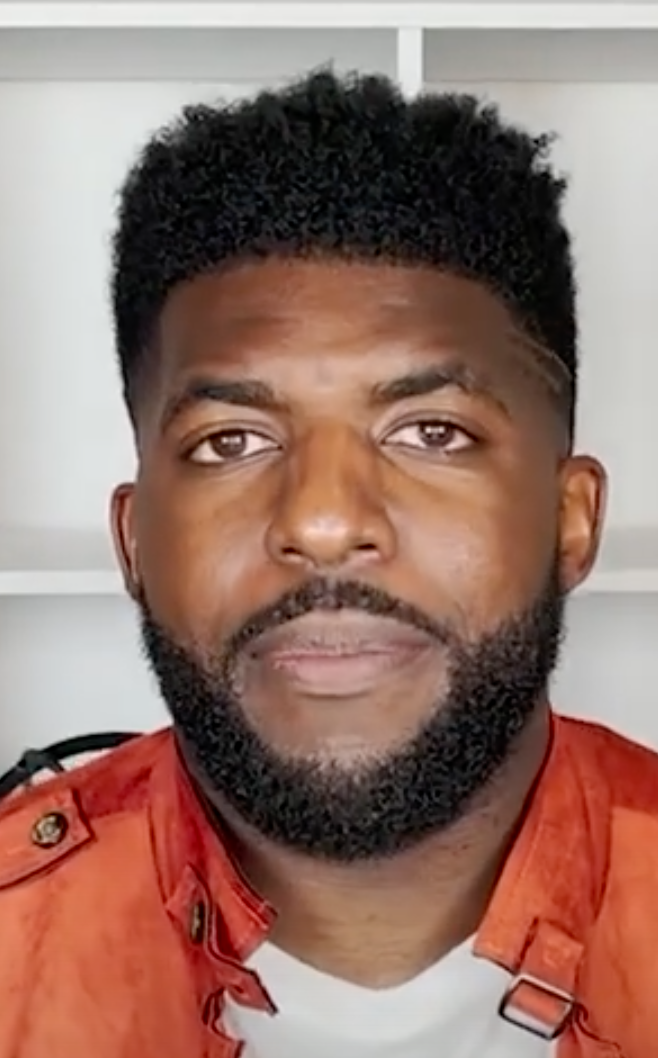
- Acho in 2021

No. 59, 51
- Position: Linebacker

Personal information
- Born: November 10, 1990 (age 36); Dallas, Texas, U.S.
- Listed height: 6 ft 2 in (1.88 m)
- Listed weight: 240 lb (109 kg)

Career information
- High school: St. Mark's (Dallas)
- College: Texas (2008–2011)
- NFL draft: 2012: 6th round, 204th overall pick

Career history
- Cleveland Browns (2012); Philadelphia Eagles (2013)*; New York Giants (2013)*; Philadelphia Eagles (2013–2015)
- * Offseason or practice squad member only

Awards and highlights
- Third-team All-American (2011); First-team All-Big 12 (2011); Second-team All-Big 12 (2010)

Career NFL statistics
- Total tackles: 33
- Stats at Pro Football Reference

Emmanuel Chinedum Acho (born November 10, 1990) is an American sports analyst, author and former professional football player who now hosts a YouTube sports show. He played as a linebacker for the Cleveland Browns and Philadelphia Eagles in the National Football League (NFL), and prior to that he played college football for the Texas Longhorns before being selected by the Browns in the sixth round of the 2012 NFL draft.

In addition to his broadcasting responsibilities, he created and hosted an anti-racism digital series called Uncomfortable Conversations with a Black Man, He turned that into a book with the same title, and released a second book, Uncomfortable Conversations with a Black Boy, and a 3rd book, with Noa Tishby, called Uncomfortable Conversations with a Jew. All three of his books became New York Times bestsellers, with the 2nd being a #1 New York Times bestseller and the book with Tishby won the National Jewish Book Award. In between he wrote a 4th book, "Illogical: Saying Yes to a Life Without Limits."

== Early life and education ==
Acho is Nigerian American and was born in Dallas to Igbo immigrants, Dr. Sonny and Christie Acho, from Isiukwuato, Nigeria. Christine Acho ran track at University College Hospital in Nigeria.

The entire family, which includes Acho and his 3 siblings, was involved in African missionary work since the children were young, and the parents are on the board of directors of the Living Hope Christian Ministries and its Operation HOPE, which provides medical services in Nigeria. Sonny Acho has also served as pastor to the Living Hope Bible Fellowship Church and as a mental health professional in North Dallas.

Acho graduated from the St. Mark's School of Texas in Dallas, Texas, where he lettered in football, basketball and track and field. As a senior, he was tabbed the state's top linebacker by Dave Campbell's Texas Football and one of the 150 top recruits in the country by ESPNU and he led his team to the Southwest Preparatory Conference (SPC) State Championship. He was all-SPC as a Junior and lettered for 3 years.

In track he was a 4-year letter earner. He recorded personal bests of 57-4 (shot put) and 177-3 (discus, which remains the school's record).

Widely recruited, he chose to attend the University of Texas.

One of his siblings, Sam Acho, also attended St. Mark's and the University of Texas before a career in the NFL.

== College career ==
Acho played in 48 games during his 4-year career at Texas, including 26 starts. He led his team in tackles in 2011 and, over his 4-year career, recorded 278 tackles (159 solo), 41 TFL, eight sacks, seven forced fumbles, three fumble recoveries, two INTs, 13 PBU and 26 pressures. In his first three seasons he played with his brother Sam.

In 2008 he played in 10 games and missed the other 3 with a knee injury. He recorded 6 tackles and a force fumble on a Longhorn team that was division co-champions, Fiesta Bowl winners and finished #3/#4 with a 12-1 record.

The next season he had his first starts and appeared in every game on his way to an All-Big 12 Honorable Mention honors. He recorded 45 tackles, a 13-yard interception return, a team-high 3 forced fumbles, 10 TFLs and, against #20 Oklahoma, two fumble recoveries. The Longhorns went 13-0 in the regular season, won the Big 12 and played in the 2010 BCS National Championship Game.

In his junior year he played in 11 games, but missed the Iowa game with an injury. He logged 75 tackles, 8.5 TFLs, 2.5 sacks and an interception with a career-long 57 yard long TD (the only scoring of his career) against Florida Atlantic that was the longest of the year and the 18th longest in school history at the time. Against Oklahoma he had 5 TFLs, tied for 6 most in a game at Texas at the time. The Longhorns went a disappointing 5-7 while he was named 2nd team All-Big 12 by the coaches and a Big 12 Honorable Mention by the AP. He also played on a team with his brother Sam for the last time.

For his senior year, he played in all 13 games and amassed career highs for tackles (a team-leading 131), TFLs (14.5), sacks (3) and Pass Deflections (6) while also forcing a fumble. Against Missouri he had 5 TFLs, again tying for 6th most in a game in school history at the time. He helped Texas finish 8-5 and California in the Holiday Bowl. That season he received recognition for his accomplishments on the field and off. He made the Capital One Academic All-District 7 team, the AFCA Good Works Team and was a consensus First Team All-Big 12 player. He was a finalist for the Lott IMPACT Trophy, Lowe's Senior CLASS Award, the Arthur Ashe Jr. Sports Scholar Award, and the Wuerffel Trophy. He was a semi-finalist for the William V. Campbell Trophy. He also won numerous team awards and was a game captain for 6 games and was a 2-time honorable mention CFPA Linebacker of the Week winner after the Texas Tech and Missouri games. For the third season in a row he was named first-team Academic All-Big 12 selection.

After his senior year, he competed in the 2011 Senior Bowl.

He graduated in December 2011 with a degree in sports management and completed his master's degree in sports psychology in 2017, both from the University of Texas at Austin.

== Playing career ==
Pre-draft measurables
Height	Weight	Arm length	Hand span	Wingspan	40-yard dash	10-yard split	20-yard split	Vertical jump	Broad jump	Bench press
6 ft 1 5/8 in (1.87 m)	238 lb (108 kg)	33 in (0.84 m)	10 in (0.25 m)	6 ft 8 1/4 in (2.04 m)	4.73 s	1.60 s	2.72 s	35.5 in (0.90 m)	9 ft 10 in (3.00 m)	24 reps
All values from NFL Combine

=== Cleveland Browns ===
Acho was selected by the Cleveland Browns in the sixth round, with the 204th overall selection, of the 2012 NFL draft. On August 27, 2012 he was placed on injured reserve after a leg injury and missed the entire 2012 season.

=== Philadelphia Eagles (first stint) ===
On April 11, 2013, Acho was traded to the Philadelphia Eagles in exchange for running back Dion Lewis. He was released by Philadelphia on September 2.

=== New York Giants ===
On September 10, 2013, the New York Giants signed Acho to their practice squad.

=== Philadelphia Eagles (second stint) ===
On October 21, 2013, the Philadelphia Eagles signed Acho off the Giants' practice squad following an injury to Jake Knott. He saw limited playing time in 6 games, getting his first NFL tackles. Acho was made gameday inactive once Mychal Kendricks and Knott were back. Acho was waived by the Eagles on December 17, before the season ended, but re–signed to the team's practice squad the next day.

Acho re–signed with the Eagles on January 6, 2014, during the offseason. He was released by Philadelphia on August 30, and again re–signed to the Eagles' practice squad the next day. Acho was promoted to the active roster on September 9, after Najee Goode was injured. Following DeMeco Ryans' season-ending injury in Week 9, he was thrust into a prominent role, along with Casey Matthews. Acho played in 14 games and recorded 31 tackles.

In 2015, Acho suffered a thumb injury and was waived at the final cut to 53 players. He was re–signed to the Eagles on November 9 after Jordan Hicks was placed on injured reserve with a shoulder injury. Acho ultimately saw no playing time and was released on November 24. This transaction marked the end of Acho's NFL career.

== Media career ==
Acho took a temporary job in 2016 as an analyst for the Longhorn Network and then transitioned to a full-time analyst that fall. In 2018, he was promoted to ESPN2's college football programming. Acho was one of four hosts of "Cover Four" which airs on the official website of the Dallas Cowboys, and was one of four anchors at the Texas Gameday Desk on the Longhorn Network. On June 10, 2020, it was announced that he would be leaving ESPN to join Fox Sports and co-host the afternoon studio show Speak for Yourself, replacing Jason Whitlock.

On June 3, 2020, following the murder of George Floyd, Acho began a digital series, entitled Uncomfortable Conversations with a Black Man, "in order to educate and inform on racism, systemic racism, social injustice, rioting & the hurt Black people are feeling today". He wrote a book of the same name, which was released on November 10, 2020, by Macmillan Publishers (ISBN 9781250800473). According to Acho, 18,000 copies were sold on its first day. An adapted version for young readers, entitled Uncomfortable Conversations with a Black Boy, was published on May 4, 2021, by the same publisher.(ISBN 9781250801067) and became a #1 New York Times bestseller in its first week of publication

On February 27, 2021, Acho announced that he would host the 25th season of The Bachelor "After the Final Rose" Special, replacing Chris Harrison. He has been invited twice to compete on The Bachelorette, and is friends with Rachel Lindsay, who encouraged him to do "Uncomfortable Conversations".

On June 8, 2021, Acho received a Sports Emmy for Outstanding Sports Personality/Emerging On-Air Talent following his first season co-hosting Speak for Yourself. On September 19, Acho received a Primetime Emmy Award for Outstanding Short Form Nonfiction or Reality Series for his digital series, Uncomfortable Conversations with a Black Man.

Acho's third book was published in March 2022: Illogical : Saying Yes to a Life Without Limits (ISBN 9781250836441, Macmillan Publishers). In this book, he encourages readers "to become change-makers".

On August 31, 2022, FS1 announced their new fall lineup, promoting Acho as the lead anchor of the rebranded Speak, accompanied by two-time Super Bowl champion and six-time Pro Bowler LeSean McCoy and longtime FS1 studio show contributor and host Joy Taylor.

In 2023 he was in the Oscar-nominated documentary short The ABCs of Book Banning after his book Uncomfortable Conversations with a Black Boy was banned by several school districts. In 2025 Uncomfortable Conversations with a Black Man was pulled from the Naval Academy library.

In April 2024, Acho published a book co-authored with Israeli activist, actress, model and producer Noa Tishby entitled Uncomfortable Conversations with a Jew. The book explores Judaism and the history of antisemitism in America and around the world through a structure in which Acho asks questions and Tishby answers them. Later, in August 2024, Acho was announced as a co-host of FS1's newly launched The Facility.

In November 2024 he was host of the HBO Max show "Second Chance Stage", a talent competition that gave performers a second chance at their big break.

In July 2025, Fox Sports 1 canceled The Facility, as part of a network shakeup that also ended Speak and Breakfast Ball. According to People, the cancellations were due to low ratings and challenges attracting a large audience.

In September 2025, Acho and longtime co-host LeSean McCoy announced the creation of a new show called "Speakeasy" on YouTube, a show that streams after NFL games.

== Personal life ==
Acho's older brother, Sam Acho, played in the NFL from 2011 to 2019 and has been a college football analyst for ESPN since 2021.

On January 9, 2015, Eagles fan Hannah Delmonte contacted Acho via Instagram. Delmonte asked Acho to escort her to her junior prom if she received 2,000 retweets on Twitter. Acho felt 2,000 retweets was too low, so he increased it to 10,000 retweets and gave Delmonte one week to meet the goal. Less than three hours later, Delmonte posted a picture showing that she'd received over 10,000 retweets, and Acho accepted the invitation. On February 20, 2015, Acho took time off from his graduate studies at the University of Texas and flew to Purcellville, VA, to personally accept Delmonte's prom invitation, nicknamed 'Promposal' by the media. On May 9, 2015, Acho escorted Delmonte to her junior prom in Purcellville, VA.

Acho identifies as a Christian. Acho has continued his family's medical missionary work, writing in a 2018 tweet: "My family's annual mission trip to #Nigeria COMPLETE! We treated over 1,800 patients, performed 162 surgeries & tried to love like Jesus does."

Acho delivered the Commencement speech at the University of Texas at Austin in May 2022.

== See also ==
- Notable alumni of St. Mark's School of Texas
