= ESPN Sports Saturday =

- Genre: Sports anthology series
- Presented by: none
- Country of origin: United States
- Original language: English
- No. of seasons: 6

Production
- Camera setup: Single-camera
- Running time: 120 minutes
- Production company: ESPN

Original release
- Network: ABC
- Release: April 3, 2010 – August 2015

Related
- 30 for 30 on ABC; ABC's Wide World of Sports

ESPN Sports Saturday was an American sports anthology television program that was broadcast on the American Broadcasting Company (ABC). Produced by sister cable sports network ESPN, it premiered on April 3, 2010. The two-hour program regularly aired on Saturdays at 4:00 p.m. Eastern Time between mid-January and late August, to fill time on weeks when ABC did not air any afternoon sports programming outside of college football season.

The first half of the block initially contained an anthology of ESPN-produced documentary content, such as ESPN Films productions and E:60 features; the block would sometimes air first-run content, such as new episodes of Homecoming with Rick Reilly and 30 for 30. The second half of the block originally featured Winners Bracket, a studio show co-hosted by Hannah Storm and Marcellus Wiley where tournament-styled matchups were used to determine the best sports highlight of the week. The following season, Winners Bracket was cancelled and replaced by a show featuring highlights of ESPN's weekday talk shows, and previews of the upcoming week in sports.

In August 2015, ESPN Sports Saturday was cancelled, with the Saturday afternoon schedule otherwise being given back to affiliates.

== See also ==
- Wide World of Sports
- CBS Sports Spectacular
