= Kristine Leahy =

American television host and sports reporter

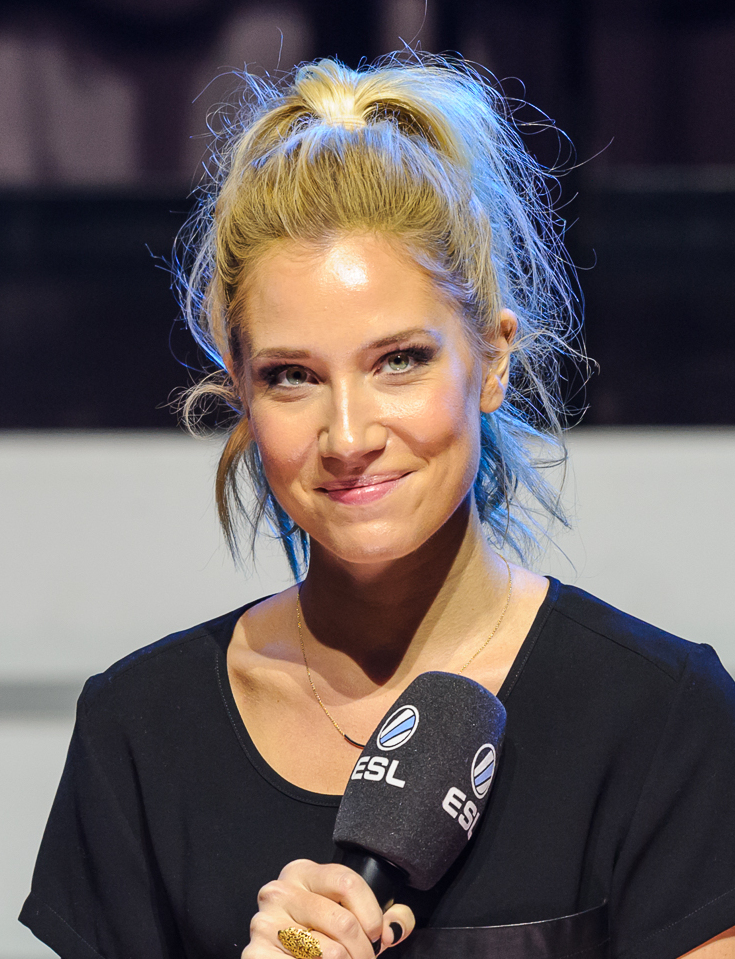
- Leahy in 2015
- Born: October 16, 1986 (age 40); Chicago, Illinois, U.S.
- Education: Boston University
- Occupation: Talk show host
- Years active: 2012–present
- Known for: The Herd, American Ninja Warrior

Kristine Leahy (born October 16, 1986) is an American television host and former sports reporter. She is most known as a former host on NBC's American Ninja Warrior. She was the former co-host and newswoman of Fox Sports 1's simulcast of The Herd with Colin Cowherd and was also a former anchor and reporter for KCBS-TV in Los Angeles.

In 2018, Leahy began hosting Fair Game with Kristine Leahy on Fox Sports 1. The show was cancelled in December 2019.

== Early life ==
Leahy was born in Chicago Illinois, where she became interested in sports. She graduated from Prairie Ridge High School in Crystal Lake, Illinois in 2005. She earned a Bachelor of Science in journalism from Boston University.

== Career ==
After college, Leahy got a job at the sports radio station WEEI in Boston. After a two-year stint at WEEI, she transitioned to a position as an official reporter of the Boston Celtics and Celtics.com. She turned that into a job at FOX Boston, where she covered all Boston area sports teams.

Leahy moved to Los Angeles in 2012 and covered a variety of different sports, most notably as a sideline reporter for Turner Sports' March Madness coverage. She worked for a variety of CBS affiliated sports outlets, including the local CBS Los Angeles news. Leahy then became the sideline reporter for American Ninja Warrior on NBC. In September 2015, she took a job to join former ESPN Radio host Colin Cowherd on his new show after his exodus to FOX. Cowherd cited a lack of female voices in sports talk radio as a reason for Leahy's addition to the show, as well as Leahy's history of developing useful sources as a sports journalist.

On May 17, 2017, Leahy had a heated exchange with LaVar Ball on The Herd with Colin Cowherd. Ball never faced in Leahy's direction for the whole interview, apparently trying to talk only with Colin Cowherd on the other side of the studio. When Leahy asked Ball how many shoes he had already sold, he said "stay in your lane" and called her a "hater", which led to accusations of sexism against Ball.

In 2021, she became host of the Las Vegas Raiders show titled, "Raiders: Talk of the Nation." She was replaced in 2022 by Sibley Scoles.
