= Scoop Jackson (writer) =

American sports journalist, cultural critic (born 1963)

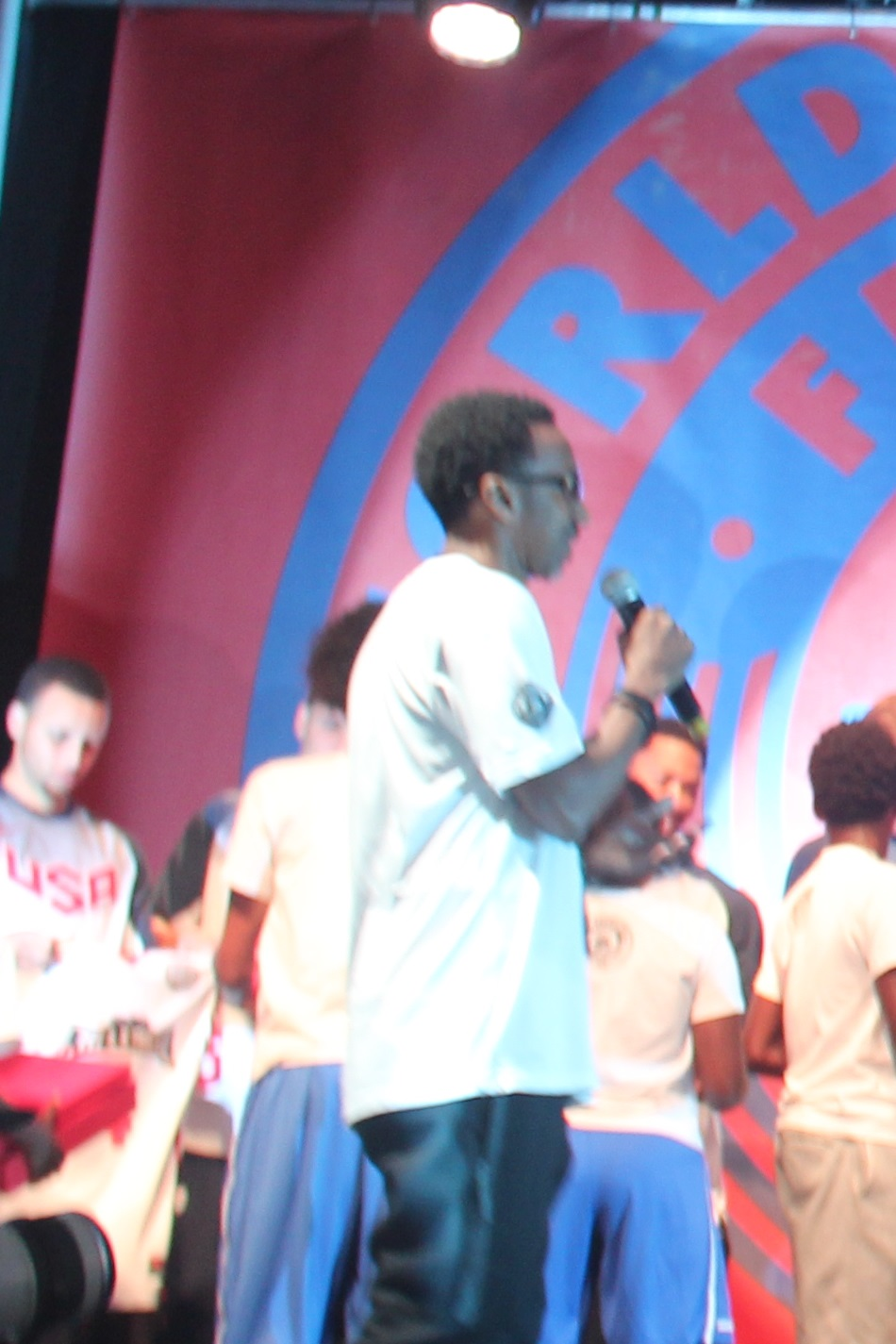
- Jackson with Team USA at the World Basketball Festival, 2014.
- Born: Robert Jackson; November 23, 1963 (age 62); Chicago, Illinois, U.S.
- Education: Xavier University of Louisiana (BA) Howard University (MA)
- Occupations: Sports and cultural journalist, critic
- Years active: 1986-present
- Spouse: Tracy Jackson
- Children: 2

Robert "Scoop" Jackson (born November 23, 1963) is an American sports journalist, author and cultural critic. He is a columnist for the Chicago Sun-Times, and was previously the senior editor and national columnist for ESPN.com, senior editor for Slam magazine and executive editor for XXL magazine.

== Early life ==
Jackson was born and raised in Chicago, where he still lives with his wife Tracy and two sons; he was born the day after U.S. President John F. Kennedy was assassinated. He received the nickname "Scoop" after his uncle joked, "This boy scooped Kennedy. Put him on the cover of the paper." He attended Luther High School South in Chicago, was educated at Xavier University (LA) and received a Master in Arts degree from Howard University where he made the National Dean's List in 1990-91 before becoming a journalist. His father was a writer for the Rocky Mountain News in Denver.

== Career ==
Jackson began his career as a freelance writer. His writing has appeared in various publications, including: USA Today, the Washington Post, the Chicago Tribune, The Source, Vibe, and The Final Call. He has written for basketball and hip hop magazines since 1995, executive editing SLAM Magazine, XXL, and edited Hoop and Inside Stuff. SLAM's first editor-in-chief, Tony Gervino, called Jackson "the most important person in SLAM history," having "launched a generation of writers and kids who said, 'I can do that now.'" Jackson's first article for SLAM appeared in the January 1995 issue titled "The Large Professor", a story about Shaquille O'Neal. At one time, Jackson pushed SLAM publisher Dennis Page to put Allen Iverson on the cover of the magazine while Iverson was still playing basketball at Georgetown University, threatening to resign if this did not happen. In addition to his regular feature articles for SLAM, in 2004 Jackson began to write a back-page column named "Game Point", in which he aired opinions on various basketball-related topics. Jackson continued to write for SLAM until the July 2005 issue.

Jackson has been a frequent guest on radio and TV sports talk shows, and was regularly featured on ESPN's SportsCentury series.

In 2000 Jackson was commissioned by Nike to pen the first book about the company's contribution to basketball and sneaker culture with Sole Provider: 30 Years of Nike Basketball. Jackson stayed on with the company for five years as a content writer and copywriter before joining ESPN.

He began writing for ESPN.com on March 8, 2005, with his first article being a statement of his sporting views, entitled "Scoop's Manifesto". In 2006, upon his one-year anniversary with ESPN, he had a follow-up article stating what he had learned on the job. The article ended with him saying that he believes he is continuing Ralph Wiley's legacy, and stated that "I hope that I am doing him justice." Consequently, this article led to a feud with now former ESPN.com columnist Jason Whitlock, who criticized Jackson in an interview and called him a "bojangler" for portraying himself as the next Ralph Wiley. This led to Whitlock's firing from ESPN.

While writing for ESPN, he often campaigns against what he perceives as injustices against blacks in America. In a Jan 10th 2008 article entitled "Time for Tiger to roar," Jackson called for golfer Tiger Woods to show outrage over a comment a friend and golf announcer made during one of Tiger's matches. He also wrote an article entitled "The Willingham Question" in which he claims that Notre Dame exhibited racism in the firing of then-head football coach Tyrone Willingham.

During the 2008 World Series, Jackson found himself surrounded by controversy after writing a column about Tampa Bay Rays star B.J. Upton. Jackson argued that Upton (who is African-American) can be a role model to the black community because of his "propensity to be lazy". One writer for a Rays blog later said, "Could you imagine Scoop Jackson's reaction if Peter Gammons had written that paragraph? ... Good lord Scoop. We don't mean to yell, but did you eat paint chips when you were a kid? Of all the positive things Upton does on the baseball field that are worthy of emulating, Jackson picks laziness as why inner-city kids will gravitate to the Rays center fielder." His first contribution to ESPN The Magazine appeared in the May 8, 2006 issue titled "It's Time" which was a short article explaining why he was picking the New Jersey Nets to win the 2005-06 NBA championship. Having grown up with Tim Hardaway, he interviewed him for a column that appeared on ESPN.com on February 23, 2007, about Hardaway's comment, "I hate gay people."

In 2015 Jackson transferred from senior writer at ESPN.com to senior writer at Sportscenter for ESPN. He also returned to copywrite for Nike, helping develop their EQUALITY campaigns. In 2017 he won the New York International Television & Film gold medal award for Sports Coverage for his ESPN feature on the anticipation of the Chicago Cubs winning the World Series.

In 2023 Jackson began writing a weekly column for the Chicago Sun-Times. He also collaborated with Basketball Hall of Famer George Gervin on Gervin's autobiography, Ice: Why I Was Born to Score, developing the book from extensive interviews conducted during 2021.

== Books ==
Jackson is the author of several books on sports, hip-hop and culture.

- The Last Black Mecca: Hip-Hop (1994)
- The Darkside: Chronicling the Young Black Experience (1997)
- Sole Provider: 30 Years of Nike Basketball (2002)
- The Game Is Not A Game: The Power, Protest, and Politics of American Sports (2020)
- Ice: Why I Was Born to Score (collaboration with George Gervin on Gervin's autobiography) (2023)

== Personal ==
Jackson is a fan of the Chicago White Sox and the New York Knicks. He is a founding member of The Music Snobs podcast.
