= Jason Whitlock =

American sports journalist (born 1967)

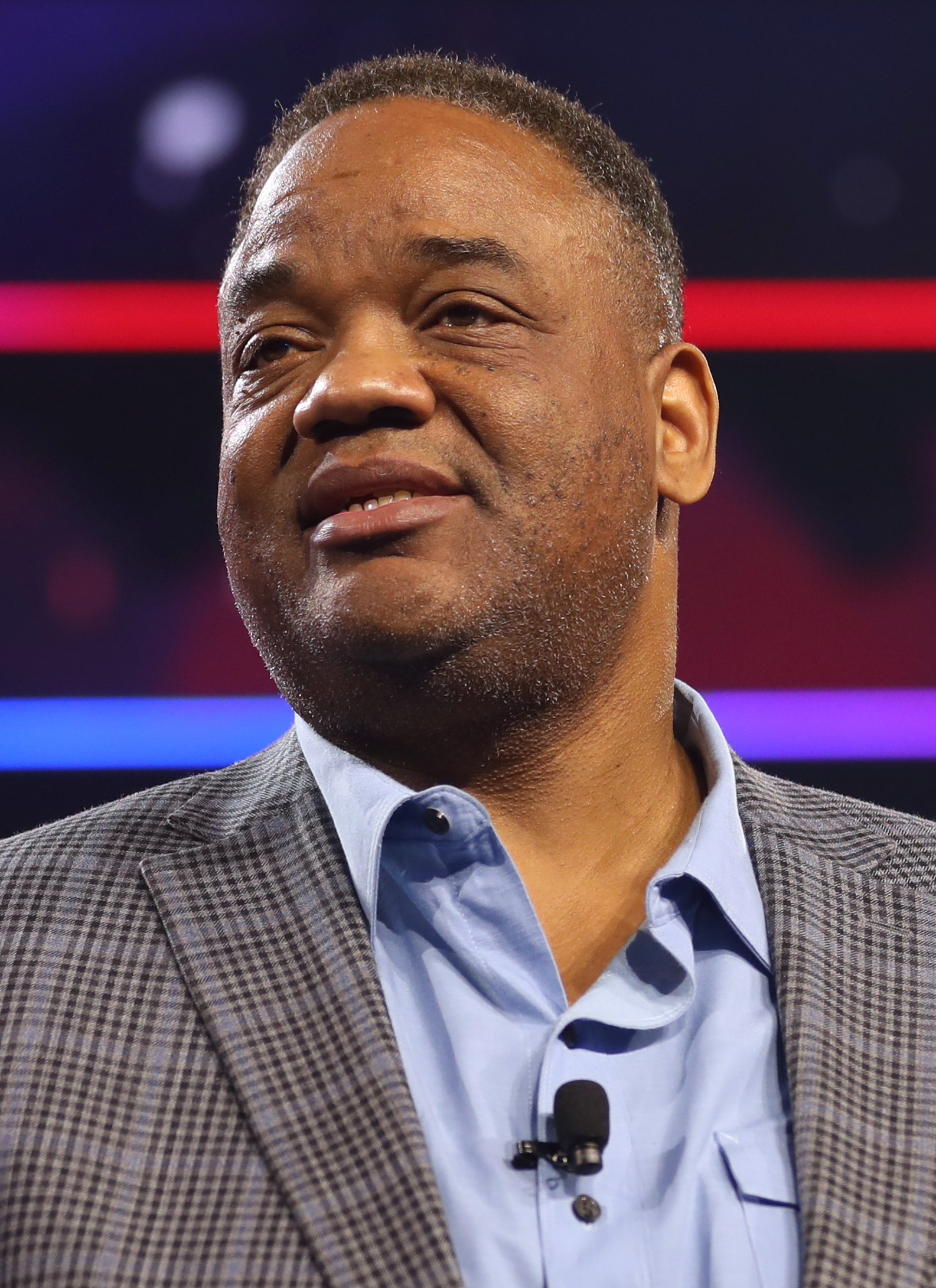
- Whitlock in 2023
- Born: Jason Lee Whitlock; April 27, 1967 (age 59); Indianapolis, Indiana, U.S.
- Education: Ball State University (BA)
- Presenting career
- Show: Speak for Yourself; Fearless with Jason Whitlock
- Stations: Fox Sports Radio; Fox Sports 1 Fox News; Blaze Media

Jason Lee Whitlock (born April 27, 1967) is an American former sports columnist who currently hosts a program for the conservative media company Blaze Media titled Fearless with Jason Whitlock. Whitlock was a sports columnist at The Kansas City Star, AOL Sports, Foxsports.com, and ESPN. He was a radio personality for WHB and KCSP sports stations in the Kansas City area. Whitlock played Division I college football at Ball State as an offensive lineman.

== Journalism career ==
=== Early career ===
Whitlock's first job was working part-time for The Herald-Times in Bloomington, Indiana. His first full-time job was as a reporter for The Charlotte Observer. After approximately one year there, he joined The Ann Arbor News in 1992 and spent two years covering the University of Michigan.

=== Kansas City Star ===
In 1994, Whitlock was hired by The Kansas City Star. In 1998, Whitlock was suspended for heckling fans at a Kansas City Chiefs game.

The Scripps Howard Foundation awarded Whitlock its National Journalism Award for commentary on March 7, 2008. Whitlock was the first sportswriter to win the award and $10,000 prize. On August 16, 2010, the Kansas City Star announced Whitlock's departure from that paper.

=== ESPN ===
In 2002, Whitlock started writing columns for ESPN.com's Page 2. Whitlock had guest-hosted several ESPN TV shows, including Jim Rome Is Burning, and Pardon the Interruption. He was a regular fill-in host on The Jim Rome Show on Premiere Radio Networks. He also appeared regularly on ESPN's The Sports Reporters.

=== Leaving ESPN for AOL Sports ===
In 2006, Whitlock announced the departure of his online column from ESPN.com's Page 2 in favor of AOL Sports, but initially expected to continue his television work for ESPN. However, after the announcement, Whitlock was interviewed by sports blog The Big Lead, and disparaged two of his ESPN colleagues. Whitlock labeled Mike Lupica "an insecure, mean-spirited busybody", and called Robert "Scoop" Jackson a "clown", saying that "the publishing of Jackson's fake ghetto posturing is an insult to black intelligence." Jackson, like Whitlock, is African-American. Whitlock then disappeared from all ESPN television work. He soon announced to The Kansas City Star readers in September 2006 that he was fired altogether from ESPN as a result of his remarks; he wrote that the company doesn't tolerate criticism and acted as they saw fit. Whitlock's first AOL Sports column was published September 29, 2006.

=== Return to ESPN ===
His new website The Undefeated was scheduled to launch on ESPN.com sometime in the summer of 2015. After over a year and a half of delays, ESPN announced that Whitlock would no longer serve as the editor in chief for The Undefeated, and he was replaced on an interim basis by Leon Carter, the editorial director for the site. In October 2015, Whitlock's employment at ESPN ended.

=== Return to Fox ===
In 2016, Whitlock began a new show airing on Fox Sports 1, Speak for Yourself with Cowherd and Whitlock. Cowherd was replaced by former Buffalo Bills defensive end Marcellus Wiley in 2018, and the show was rebranded as Speak for Yourself with Whitlock and Wiley. On June 1, 2020, it was announced that Fox would not renew Whitlock's contract after the two sides couldn't come to an agreement.

=== OutKick ===
In June 2020, Whitlock officially partnered alongside Clay Travis at OutKick. In January 2021, Travis announced Whitlock's departure. Whitlock's immediate response was a tweet: "Do not believe anything written or said about me unless I say it. All else is Fake News." A month later, he told an interviewer that: "It was a bad business deal, a byproduct of my failure to properly vet my business partners."

=== Blaze Media ===
In June 2021, Whitlock joined Blaze Media and started a new show, Fearless with Jason Whitlock. In an interview with Tucker Carlson, Whitlock stated that "a lot of what the left supports is Satanic". In October 2022, Whitlock defended Kanye West after West made a series of antisemitic comments. In 2024, Whitlock interviewed E. Michael Jones, a Catholic scholar known for his antisemitic views. Whitlock praised Jones in the interview, during which Jones espoused antisemitic conspiracy theories.

=== Other work ===
Whitlock has also been published in Vibe, Playboy, and The Sporting News. In the June 2008 issue of Playboy, he wrote a 5,000-word column questioning America's incarceration and drug-war policies. Playboy headlined the column "The Black KKK", which prompted Whitlock to write two columns, one in the Kansas City Star and another on Foxsports.com, criticizing Playboy editorial director Chris Napolitano for the misleading and inflammatory headline.

Whitlock has been critical of Black Lives Matter, comparing it to the Ku Klux Klan. He has also referred to it as "Marxist" and a "dangerous" organization.

In 2023, Whitlock released a two-hour video questioning whether Michelle Obama was transgender.

In December 2023, Whitlock expressed a dislike of the Nineteenth Amendment and said that granting suffrage to women destroyed the principle of "one vote per household", which he associates with a time when American culture more strongly valued the family unit.

Whitlock has attended and spoken at the conservative summit Turning Point USA.

== High school and college football ==
At Warren Central High School in Indianapolis, Whitlock played offensive line and was team captain of their nationally ranked and state champion football team. There he blocked for his friend, and future NFL number one overall pick, Jeff George. Although not highly recruited by college programs, Jason earned a college football scholarship to Ball State in Muncie, Indiana. There, he earned a Bachelor of Science in journalism degree in 1990.
