= Speak (talk show) =

- Also known as: Speak for Yourself
- Genre: Talk show
- Starring: Joy Taylor; Paul Pierce; Keyshawn Johnson; Emmanuel Acho; LeSean McCoy; James Jones; Marcellus Wiley; Colin Cowherd; Jason Whitlock; David Helman
- Country of origin: United States
- Original language: English

Production
- Production locations: Fox Network Center (Fox Studio Lot Building 101), 10201 W Pico Blvd, Century City, Los Angeles, California
- Running time: 60 minutes (2016–2018, 2024–2025); 90 minutes (2018-2020, 2022–2024); 120 minutes (2020–2022)

Original release
- Network: Fox Sports 1
- Release: June 13, 2016 – July 11, 2025

Related
- Talking Footy

Speak (formerly Speak for Yourself) is a discontinued American sports talk show hosted by Joy Taylor, and featuring panelists Keyshawn Johnson and Paul Pierce. Former panelists included Emmanuel Acho, LeSean McCoy, and James Jones. The series premiered on June 13, 2016, on Fox Sports 1. In September 2018, Marcellus Wiley replaced Colin Cowherd as Jason Whitlock's co-host. Also in 2018, the show added two sidekicks, Uncle Jimmy (Dodds) and Darnell Smith. On June 1, 2020, the show's long-term host and show-creator Jason Whitlock left Fox Sports. On June 10, former NFL linebacker Emmanuel Acho was named Wiley's new co-host. Wiley announced his departure in July 2022. The show debuted under its new shortened name Speak on September 6, 2022.

The show frequently features guest stars. Former NFL stars LaVar Arrington, T. J. Houshmandzadeh, James Harrison, Eric Dickerson, Tony Gonzalez, and Michael Vick have been frequent contributors to the show, as well as former NBA veteran Jim Jackson and NBA reporter Ric Bucher.

On September 3, 2024, Acho, McCoy, and Jones departed the show to join with Chase Daniel to start a new show named The Facility. Taylor took over as lead host of Speak, joined by Johnson, Pierce, and occasionally Michael Irvin.

The show was canceled by Fox Sports in July 2025.
